= Zhang Gong (general) =

People's Liberation Army general

- 张工

Political Commissar of the PLA Academy of Military Science
- In office December 1993 – June 2000
- President: Zhao Nanqi; Xu Huizi; Liu Jingsong; Wang Zuxun
- Preceded by: Zhang Xusan
- Succeeded by: Wen Zongren

Political Commissar of the Chengdu Military Region
- In office November 1992 – December 1993
- Commander: Li Jiulong
- Preceded by: Gu Shanqing
- Succeeded by: Zhang Zhijian

Political Commissar of the Beijing Military Region
- In office April 1990 – November 1992
- Commander: Wang Chengbin
- Preceded by: Liu Zhenhua
- Succeeded by: Gu Shanqing

Personal details
- Born: July 1935 (age 91) Guo County, Shanxi, China
- Party: Chinese Communist Party
- Education: North China Military Region Military and Political Cadre School

Military service
- Allegiance: People's Republic of China
- Branch/service: People's Liberation Army Ground Force
- Years of service: 1951–2000
- Rank: General

Chinese name
- Simplified Chinese: 张工
- Traditional Chinese: 張工
Transcriptions
Standard Mandarin
- Hanyu Pinyin: Zhāng Gōng

Zhang Gong (Chinese: 张工; born July 1935) is a general in the People's Liberation Army of China who served as political commissar of the Beijing Military Region from 1990 to 1992, political commissar of the Chengdu Military Region from 1992 to 1993, and political commissar of the PLA Academy of Military Science from 1993 to 2000.

He was a representative of the 13th National Congress of the Chinese Communist Party. He was a member of the 14th and 15th Central Committee of the Chinese Communist Party. He was a delegate to the 7th National People's Congress. He was a member of the Standing Committee of the 10th Chinese People's Political Consultative Conference.

== Biography ==
Zhang was born in Guo County (now Yuanping), Shanxi, in July 1935. He enlisted in the People's Liberation Army (PLA) in July 1951, and joined the Chinese Communist Party (CCP) in December 1961. He served in the Beijing Military Region (formerly known as North China Military Region) since June 1952, becoming director of Political Department in June 1985 and political commissar in April 1990. He was commissioned as political commissar of the Chengdu Military Region in November 1992, he remained in that position until December 1993, when he was transferred to the PLA Academy of Military Science and given the position of political commissar.

He was promoted to the rank of major general (shaojiang) in September 1988, lieutenant general (zhongjiang) in July 1990, and general (shangjiang) in March 1998.

Military offices
Preceded by Zhang Zongwen	Director of Political Department of the Beijing Military Region; 1985–1990	Succeeded by Cao Heqing
Preceded by Liu Zhenhua	Political Commissar of the Beijing Military Region; 1990–1992	Succeeded by Gu Shanqing
Preceded by Gu Shanqing	Political Commissar of the Chengdu Military Region; 1992–1993	Succeeded by Zhang Zhijian
Preceded by Zhang Xusan	Political Commissar of the PLA Academy of Military Science; 1993–2000	Succeeded by Wen Zongren
