= Tong Baocun =

- 佟宝存

Deputy Commander of the Shenyang Military Region
- In office April 1990 – November 1996
- Commander: Liu Jingsong; Wang Ke; Li Xinliang
- Preceded by: Zhu Dunfa
- Succeeded by: Wu Yuqian

Personal details
- Born: November 1933 Laoting County, Hebei, China
- Died: 24 October 2020 (aged 86) Shenyang, Liaoning, China
- Party: Chinese Communist Party

Military service
- Allegiance: People's Republic of China
- Branch/service: People's Liberation Army Ground Force
- Years of service: 1947–1996
- Rank: Lieutenant general
- Commands: Shenyang Military Region
- Battles/wars: Chinese Civil War; Korean War

Chinese name
- Simplified Chinese: 佟宝存
- Traditional Chinese: 佟寶存
Transcriptions
Standard Mandarin
- Hanyu Pinyin: Tóng Bǎocún

Tong Baocun (Chinese: 佟宝存; November 1933 – 24 October 2020) is a lieutenant general in the People's Liberation Army of China.

He was a member of the 14th Central Committee of the Chinese Communist Party. He was a delegate to the 7th National People's Congress. He was a member of the Standing Committee of the 9th Chinese People's Political Consultative Conference.

== Biography ==
Tong was born in Laoting County, Hebei, in November 1933.

He enlisted in the People's Liberation Army (PLA) in October 1947, and joined the Chinese Communist Party (CCP) in November 1948. During the Chinese Civil War, he served in the war and engaged in the Yangtze River Crossing campaign and the Battle of Wuhan. After the founding of the Communist State in 1949, he participated in the Korean War. He served in the Jinan Military Region for a long time. In April 1990, he was promoted to become deputy commander of the Shenyang Military Region, a position he held until November 1996.

On 24 October 2020, he died from an illness in Shenyang, Liaoning, at the age of 86.

He was promoted to the rank of major general (shaojiang) in September 1988 and lieutenant general (zhongjiang) in June 1991.

Military offices
Preceded by Zhu Dunfa	Deputy Commander of the Shenyang Military Region; 1990–1996	Succeeded by Wu Yuqian
