= Liu Anyuan =

- 刘安元

Political Commissar of the Nanjing Military Region
- In office November 1992 – December 1993
- Commander: Gu Hui
- Preceded by: Shi Yuxiao
- Succeeded by: Fang Zuqi

Political Commissar of the Second Artillery Corps
- In office April 1990 – November 1992
- Commander: Li Xuge
- Preceded by: Liu Lifeng
- Succeeded by: Sui Yongju

Political Commissar of the People's Liberation Army General Logistics Department
- In office November 1987 – April 1990
- Commander: Zhao Nanqi
- Preceded by: Hong Xuezhi
- Succeeded by: Zhou Keyu

Personal details
- Born: 5 December 1927 Gaoqing County, Shandong, China
- Died: 23 May 2001 (aged 73) Nanjing, Jiangsu, China
- Party: Chinese Communist Party
- Education: Wuwei Artillery School

Military service
- Allegiance: People's Republic of China
- Branch/service: People's Liberation Army Ground Force
- Years of service: 1945–1993
- Rank: Lieutenant general
- Commands: Nanjing Military Region
- Battles/wars: Second Sino-Japanese War; Chinese Civil War
- Awards: Order of Liberation (1955); PLA Meritorious Service Medal (1998)

Chinese name
- Simplified Chinese: 刘安元
- Traditional Chinese: 劉安元
Transcriptions
Standard Mandarin
- Hanyu Pinyin: Liú Ānyuán

Liu Anyuan (Chinese: 刘安元; 5 December 1927 – 23 May 2001) was a lieutenant general in the People's Liberation Army of China who served as political commissar of the People's Liberation Army General Logistics Department from 1987 to 1990, political commissar of the Second Artillery Corps from 1990 to 1992, and political commissar of the Nanjing Military Region from 1992 to 1993.

He was a member of the 5th National Committee of the Chinese People's Political Consultative Conference. He was a member of the 13th and 14th Central Committee of the Chinese Communist Party. He was a representative of the 14th National Congress of the Chinese Communist Party.

== Biography ==
Liu was born into a poor peasant family in Gaoqing County, Shandong, on 5 December 1927. His mother died when he was a child, and he was raised by his maternal grandfather Liu Jipei (刘继佩).

In October 1937, the Imperial Japanese Army attacked Shandong and he left school due to the Japanese occupation. He became a member of the Youth Counter-Japanese National Salvation Association (青年抗日救国会) in 1943, and took part in an underground resistance movement in response to the ongoing occupation of China by the Empire of Japan. He joined the Chinese Communist Party (CCP) in November 1943, and enlisted in the Eighth Route Army in August 1945.

During the Chinese Civil War, he served in the war and engaged in the Battle of Shanhai Pass, Battle of Changchun, Battle of Siping, Liaoshen campaign, Pingjin campaign, Yangtze River Crossing campaign, and Battle of Guangdong and Guangxi.

After establishment of the Communist State in 1949, he participated in the Battle of Guangzhou and the Battle of Hainan Island. In 1958, he was appointed commander of the 508 Artillery Regiment, and went on to attend Wuwei Artillery School three years later. He was deputy head of the Organization Division of the People's Liberation Army General Political Department and deputy head of its Cadre Division in 1973 and then deputy political commissar of the Guangzhou Military Region in 1985. In November 1987, he was promoted to become political commissar of the People's Liberation Army General Logistics Department, a position he held until April 1990, when he was commissioned as political commissar of the Second Artillery Corps. He attained the rank of lieutenant general (zhongjiang) in 1988. In November 1992, he was chosen as political commissar of the Nanjing Military Region, serving in the post until his retirement in December 1993.

On 23 May 2001, he died in Nanjing, Jiangsu, at the age of 73.

Military offices
| Preceded by Hong Xuezhi | Political Commissar of the People's Liberation Army General Logistics Department; 1987–1990 | Succeeded by Zhou Keyu |
| Preceded by Liu Lifeng | Political Commissar of the Second Artillery Corps; 1990–1992 | Succeeded by Sui Yongju |
| Preceded by Shi Yuxiao | Political Commissar of the Nanjing Military Region; 1992–1993 | Succeeded by Fang Zuqi |
