= Zhou Wenyuan =

Chinese Army general (born 1940)

- 周文元

Deputy Political Commissar of the Shenyang Military Region
- In office November 1992 – April 1999
- Political Commissar: Song Keda; Li Xinliang; Jiang Futang

Personal details
- Born: July 1940 (age 86) Tianjin, China
- Party: Chinese Communist Party
- Education: Hebei Normal College of Politics; PLA Political College

Military service
- Allegiance: People's Republic of China
- Branch/service: People's Liberation Army Ground Force
- Years of service: 1961–1999
- Rank: Lieutenant general
- Commands: Shenyang Military Region

Zhou Wenyuan (Chinese: 周文元; pinyin: Zhōu Wényuán; born July 1940) is a lieutenant general in the People's Liberation Army of China.

He was an alternate member of the 13th Central Committee of the Chinese Communist Party and a member of the 14th Central Committee of the Chinese Communist Party. He was a member of the 10th National Committee of the Chinese People's Political Consultative Conference.

== Biography ==
Zhou was born in Tianjin, in July 1940 and graduated from Hebei Normal College of Politics and the PLA Political College. He enlisted in the People's Liberation Army (PLA) in July 1961, and joined the Chinese Communist Party (CCP) in April 1963. He served in the Shenyang Military Region for a long time. He was director of Political Department of the 23rd Group Army in 1983 and one year later became director of the Political Department of Dalian Army School. In March 1985, he was appointed deputy head of the People's Liberation Army General Political Department, in addition to serving as member of the Central Political and Legal Affairs Commission since March 1990. In November 1992, he was made deputy political commissar of the Shenyang Military Region, and served until April 1999.

He was promoted to the rank of major general (shaojiang) in September 1988 and lieutenant general (zhongjiang) in July 1990.
