= Wang Jianmin (full general) =

Chinese full general (1942–2021)

- 王建民

Commander of Chengdu Military Region
- In office November 2002 – September 2007
- Preceded by: Liao Xilong
- Succeeded by: Li Shiming

Personal details
- Born: November 1942 Luannan County, Hebei, Republic of China
- Died: September 28, 2021 (aged 78) Chengdu, Sichuan, People's Republic of China
- Party: Chinese Communist Party

Military service
- Allegiance: People's Republic of China
- Branch/service: People's Liberation Army Ground Force
- Years of service: 1962–2007
- Rank: General

Wang Jianmin (Chinese: 王建民; pinyin: Wáng Jiànmín; November 1942 – 28 September 2021) was a full general (shangjiang) of the People's Liberation Army (PLA) of China. He joined the PLA in June 1962, and the Chinese Communist Party in September 1963.

== Career ==
Wang was born in Luannan County, Hebei, in November 1942.

- 1973, Operations office director and assistant section chief, operations section, operations department, Shenyang Military Region.
- 1983, Assistant Department Chief, Operations Department.
- 1985, Division Commander.
- 1987, Department Chief, Operations Department, Shenyang Military Region Command.
- 1989, Studied at the PLA National Defense University.
- 1993, Deputy Commander, 23rd Group Army.
- 1995, Commander, 23rd Group Army. Commander, 39th Group Army.
- 1997, Candidate member, 15th National People's Congress.
- 1999, Chief of Staff, Shenyang Military Region.
- 2000, Deputy Commander, Shenyang Military Region.
- 2002, Commander, Chengdu Military Region.

He was a member of the 16th Central Committee of the Chinese Communist Party.

He attained the rank of major general in July 1994, lieutenant general in 2000, and full general on June 24, 2006.

On 28 September 2021, he died from an illness in Chengdu, Sichuan, aged 78.

Military offices
Preceded by Wu Yuqian	Commander of the 23rd Army; 1995–1996	Succeeded by Liu Fengju
Preceded by Luo Youli	Commander of the 39th Group Army; 1996–1999	Succeeded by Yan Feng
Preceded by Ge Zhenfeng	Chief of Staff of the Shenyang Military Region; 1999–2000	Succeeded by Fan Changlong
Preceded by Liao Xilong	Commander of Chengdu Military Region; 2002–2007	Succeeded by Li Shiming
