= Gu Shanqing =

General in People's Liberation Army of China (1931–2024)

- 谷善庆

Political Commissar the Beijing Military Region
- In office November 1992 – November 1996
- Commander: Wang Chengbin
- Preceded by: Wan Haifeng
- Succeeded by: Zhang Gong

Political Commissar of the Chengdu Military Region
- In office April 1990 – November 1992
- Commander: Li Jiulong
- Preceded by: Zhang Gong
- Succeeded by: Du Tiehuan

Personal details
- Born: November 1931 Fu County, Liaoning, China
- Died: 23 July 2024 (aged 92) Beijing, China
- Party: Chinese Communist Party
- Education: PLA Changsha No. 1 Political School

Military service
- Allegiance: People's Republic of China
- Branch/service: People's Liberation Army Ground Force
- Years of service: 1947–1996
- Rank: General

Chinese name
- Simplified Chinese: 谷善庆
- Traditional Chinese: 谷善慶
Transcriptions
Standard Mandarin
- Hanyu Pinyin: Gǔ Shànqìng

Gu Shanqing (Chinese: 谷善庆; November 1931 – 23 July 2024) was a general in the People's Liberation Army of China who served as political commissar of the Chengdu Military Region from April 1990 to November 1992 and political commissar of the Beijing Military Region from November 1992 to November 1996.

He was a member of the 14th Central Committee of the Chinese Communist Party and a member of the Standing Committee of the 9th National People's Congress.

== Biography ==
Gu was born in Fu County (now Wafangdian), Liaoning, in November 1931.

He enlisted in the People's Liberation Army (PLA) in December 1947, and joined the Chinese Communist Party (CCP) in November 1949. He served in the Northeast Field Army before being assigned to the 41st Group Army in 1951. In 1959, he enrolled at the PLA Changsha No. 1 Political School and worked there after graduation. In 1969, he was despatched to the Guangzhou Military Region, one of the People's Liberation Army PLA Military Regions. He was made deputy political commissar of Shaoyang Military Area in 1982 and one year later was promoted to become political commissar of the Hunan Military District. He was transferred back to the Guangzhou Military Region in February 1988 and appointed deputy political commissar. In April 1990, he was commissioned as political commissar of the Chengdu Military Region, he remained in that position until April 1990, when he was transferred to the Beijing Military Region and given the position of political commissar. He retired in November 1996.

He was promoted to the rank of major general (shaojiang) in 1988, lieutenant general (zhongjiang) in 1990, and general (shangjiang) in 1994.

Gu died in Beijing on 23 July 2024, at the age of 92.

Military offices
| Preceded by Mao Zhiyong | Political commissar of the PLA Hunan Military District; 1983–1988 | Succeeded by Wu Aiqun |
| Preceded by Zhang Gong | Political Commissar of the Chengdu Military Region; 1990–1992 | Succeeded by Du Tiehuan |
| Preceded by Wan Haifeng | Political Commissar the Beijing Military Region; 1992–1996 | Succeeded by Zhang Gong |
