= Fang Zuqi =

- 方祖岐

Political Commissar of the Nanjing Military Region
- In office December 1993 – December 2000
- Commander: Gu Hui; Chen Bingde; Liang Guanglie
- Preceded by: Liu Anyuan
- Succeeded by: Lei Mingqiu

Personal details
- Born: October 1935 (age 90) Jingjiang, Jiangsu, China
- Party: Chinese Communist Party

Military service
- Allegiance: People's Republic of China
- Branch/service: People's Liberation Army Ground Force
- Years of service: 1951–2003
- Rank: General
- Commands: Shenyang Military Region; Guangzhou Military Region; Beijing Military Region; Nanjing Military Region
- Battles/wars: Korean War

Fang Zuqi (Chinese: 方祖岐; pinyin: Fāng Zǔqí; born October 1935) is a general in the People's Liberation Army of China who served as political commissar of the Nanjing Military Region from 1993 to 2000.

He was a member of the Standing Committee of the 10th Chinese People's Political Consultative Conference. He was a member of the 15th Central Committee of the Chinese Communist Party.

== Biography ==
Fang was born in Jingjiang, Jiangsu, in October 1935, while his ancestral home in Huizhou, Anhui.

He enlisted in the People's Liberation Army (PLA) in August 1951, and joined the Chinese Communist Party (CCP) in June 1956. He participated in the Korean War in June 1952. He was assigned to the Shenyang Military Region in May 1970, what he eventually served as deputy director in December 1984. He became a member of the Standing Committee of the CPC Guangzhou Military Regional Committee and director of Political Department in April 1990 before being assigned to the similar position in the Beijing Military Region in November 1992. He rose to become political commissar of the Nanjing Military Region in December 1993. In March 2003, he was chosen as vice chairperson of the Education, Science, Health and Sports Committee of the Chinese People's Political Consultative Conference.

He was promoted to the rank of major general (shaojiang) in September 1988, lieutenant general (zhongjiang) in July 1993, and general (shangjiang) in March 1998.

Military offices
Preceded by Gao Tianzheng	Director of Political Department of the Guangzhou Military Region; 1990–1992	Succeeded by Lei Mingqiu
Preceded by Cao Heqing	Director of Political Department of the Beijing Military Region; 1992–1993	Succeeded by Tian Shugen
Preceded by Liu Anyuan	Political Commissar of the Nanjing Military Region; 1993–2000	Succeeded by Lei Mingqiu
