= Wei Fulin =

Chinese politician

- 隗福临

Commander of Chengdu Military Region
- In office December 1994 – August 1995
- Preceded by: Li Jiulong
- Succeeded by: Liao Xilong

Personal details
- Born: February 1938 Xinbin County, Liaoning, Manchukuo
- Died: 15 January 2026 (aged 87) Beijing, China
- Party: Chinese Communist Party
- Education: PLA Qiqihar Infantry School; PLA Military Academy

Military service
- Allegiance: People's Republic of China
- Branch/service: People's Liberation Army Ground Force
- Years of service: 1958–2026
- Rank: General

Chinese name
- Simplified Chinese: 隗福临
- Traditional Chinese: 隗福臨
Transcriptions
Standard Mandarin
- Hanyu Pinyin: Wěi Fúlín

Wei Fulin (Chinese: 隗福临; February 1938 – 15 January 2026) was a general (shangjiang) of the People's Liberation Army (PLA). He was a representative of the 13th and 14th National Congress of the Chinese Communist Party. He was a delegate to the 9th National People's Congress and a member of the Standing Committee of the 10th National People's Congress. He was a member of the 15th Central Committee of the Chinese Communist Party.

== Biography ==
Wei was born into a Manchu family in Xinbin County (now Xinbin Manchu Autonomous County), Liaoning, Manchukuo, in February 1938. After graduating from PLA Qiqihar Infantry School in 1958, he was assigned to Shenyang Military Region. He became commander of the Operations Department of the People's Liberation Army General Staff Department in January 1985, and served until November 1992, when he was promoted to assistant chief of Joint Staff. In December 1994, he was made commander of Chengdu Military Region, a position he held until August 1995, when he was appointed deputy chief of Joint Staff.

He was promoted to the rank of major general (shaojiang) in 1988, lieutenant general (zhongjiang) in 1993 and general (shangjiang) in 2000.

Wei died on 15 January 2026, at the age of 87.

Military offices
Preceded by Li Li	Commander of the Operations Department of the People's Liberation Army General Staff Department; 1985–1992	Succeeded by Fu Chuanrong
Preceded by Li Jiulong	Commander of Chengdu Military Region; 1994–1995	Succeeded by Liao Xilong
