= Zhang Meiyuan =

Chinese general

- 张美远

Commander of the Qinghai Military District
- In office March 1993 – May 1996
- Preceded by: Fang Denghua
- Succeeded by: Lan Zhongjie

Commander of the 38th Group Army
- In office June 1989 – December 1994
- Preceded by: Xu Qinxian
- Succeeded by: Liu Pixun

Personal details
- Born: November 1937 (age 88–89) Bazhong County, Sichuan, China
- Citizenship: Chinese
- Party: Chinese Communist Party
- Education: PLA Jinzhou Infantry School; PLA Military Academy

Military service
- Allegiance: People's Republic of China
- Branch/service: People's Liberation Army Ground Force
- Years of service: 1955–1997
- Rank: Major general
- Commands: 38th Group Army

Chinese name
- Simplified Chinese: 张美远
- Traditional Chinese: 張美遠
Transcriptions
Standard Mandarin
- Hanyu Pinyin: Zhāng Měiyuǎn

Zhang Meiyuan (Chinese: 张美远; born November 1937) was a major general in the People's Liberation Army of China who served as commander of the 38th Group Army from 1989 to 1994 and commander of the Qinghai Military District from 1993 to 1996. He was a member of the 14th Central Committee of the Chinese Communist Party and is infamous for leading the 38th during the Tiananmen Square Massacre after replacing General Xu Qinxian, who refused to carry out orders by the ruling Politburo of the Communist Party and the Eight Elders to impose martial law on Beijing.

== Biography ==
Zhang was born in Bazhong County (now Bazhong), Sichuan Province, in November 1937 during the Chinese Civil War. This was also the same province which future Paramount Leader Deng Xiaoping hailed from. He enlisted in the People's Liberation Army Ground Forces (PLA) in January 1955, and joined the Chinese Communist Party (CCP) in August 1958. He graduated from the PLA Jinzhou Infantry School and the PLA Military Academy.

Zhang was promoted to deputy commander of the People's Liberation Army in 1987. In June 1989, he was promoted again to become commander, succeeding Xu Qinxian, who was court-martialed, jailed for five years and expelled from the CCP due to refuse the order to use force against demonstrators in Beijing during the 1989 Tiananmen Square protests and massacre. He led his men to suppress the students in Beijing, which played an important role in the 1989 Tiananmen Square protests and massacre.

For his gallant service at the 1989 Tiananmen Square protests and massacre, he was admitted to member of the 14th Central Committee of the Chinese Communist Party in October 1992. He also served as commander of the Qinghai Military District from 1993 to 1996. In May 1996, he was appointed deputy chief of staff of the Lanzhou Military Region, in addition to serving as deputy secretary of the Discipline Inspection Commission. He attained the rank of major general (shaojiang) in September 1988. Due to the sensitivity of the event, any mention of him has been officially removed from public memory by government censors.

Military offices
Preceded by Xu Qinxian	Commander of the 38th Group Army; 1989–1994	Succeeded by Liu Pixun
Preceded by Fang Denghua (方登华)	Commander of the Qinghai Military District; 1993–1996	Succeeded by Lan Zhongjie (兰仲杰)
