= Wang Ke =

Wang Ke may refer to:

- Wang Ke (Tang dynasty) (王珂), late-Tang military governor
- Wang Ke (general) (王克; born 1931), People's Liberation Army general
- Wang Ke (footballer) (王珂; born 1983)
