= Huang Xianzhong =

Chinese general

- 黄献中

Political Commissar of the Shenyang Military Region
- In office December 2005 – December 2010
- Preceded by: Jiang Futang
- Succeeded by: Chu Yimin

Personal details
- Born: December 1945 (age 80) Shan County, Shandong, China
- Party: Chinese Communist Party
- Education: PLA Academy of Military Engineering

Military service
- Allegiance: People's Republic of China
- Branch/service: People's Liberation Army Ground Force
- Years of service: 1964–2010
- Rank: General
- Commands: Shenyang Military Region

Chinese name
- Simplified Chinese: 黄献中
- Traditional Chinese: 黃獻中
Transcriptions
Standard Mandarin
- Hanyu Pinyin: Huáng Xiànzhōng

Huang Xianzhong (Chinese: 黄献中, born 1947) is a retired general in the People's Liberation Army (PLA) of the People's Republic of China, and the former political commissar of the PLA Shenyang Military Region.

Huang graduated from the department of missile engineering of the PLA Institute of Military Engineering in Harbin. He was the vice political commissar of the Liaoning provincial military region. In April 1999, Huang was appointed director of the political department of PLA National Defense University. He was elevated to political commissar of the University in January 2003. He was appointed to his present post as political commissar of the Shenyang Military Region in 2005. He attained the rank of lieutenant general in 2004, and general on July 15, 2008.

Huang was elected as a member of the Commission for Discipline Inspection of the 16th Chinese Communist Party National Congress. He was a member of the 17th Central Committee of the Chinese Communist Party.

Military offices
Preceded by Jiang Futang	Political Commissar of the Shenyang Military Region; 2005–2010	Succeeded by Chu Yimin
