= Wan Haifeng =

Chinese military officer (1920–2023)

- 万海峰
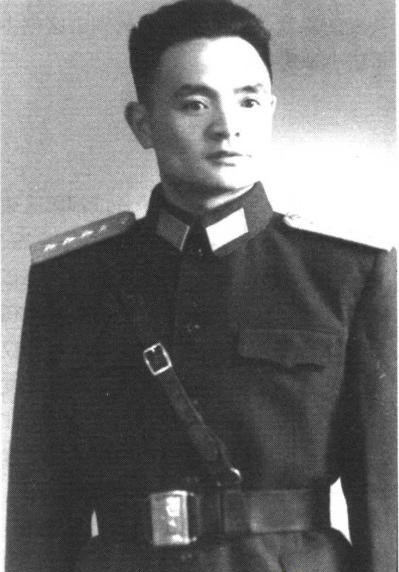
- Wan in 1955

Political Commissar of Chengdu Military Region
- In office October 1982 – April 1990
- Preceded by: Xu Liqing
- Succeeded by: Gu Shanqing

Personal details
- Born: Maotou (毛头); 25 September 1920 Guangshan County, Henan, China
- Died: 31 March 2023 (aged 102)
- Party: Chinese Communist Party
- Spouse: Zhao Zheng (1943-2019, her death)
- Children: 4
- Parent(s): Wan Tianrun; Xiao Shi
- Education: PLA National Defence University

Military service
- Allegiance: People's Republic of China
- Branch/service: People's Liberation Army Ground Force
- Years of service: 1933–1998
- Rank: General
- Commands: Beijing Military Region; Chengdu Military Region
- Battles/wars: Second Sino-Japanese War; Chinese Civil War; Korean War
- Awards: Red Star Medal; Order of Independence and Freedom; Order of Liberation

Wan Haifeng (simplified Chinese: 万海峰; traditional Chinese: 萬海峰; pinyin: Wàn Haǐfēng; 25 September 1920 – 31 March 2023) was a Chinese military general. He was awarded the military rank of general (Shangjiang) in September 1988.

Born in Guangshan County, Henan, Wan joined the Red Army at the age of 13 and joined the Chinese Communist Party at the age of 17. He fought in the Second Sino-Japanese War, the Chinese Civil War and the Korea War.

Wan was a member of the 12th Central Committee of the Chinese Communist Party a member of the Central Advisory Commission. He was delegate to the 13th National Congress of the Chinese Communist Party. He was a deputy to the 5th and 7th National People's Congress.

== Biography ==
Wan was born Maotou (毛头) into a family of farming background in September 1920 in Guangshan County, Henan, the third child of Wan Tianrun (万田润) and Mrs. Xiao (肖氏). He had two elder sisters. His mother died when he was 3.

During the Agrarian Revolutionary War (1927), he was a squad leader in the 28th Army. He participated in the Hubei-Henan-Anhui Guerrilla Warfare.

In July 1933, he joined the Red Army. His superior Gao Jingting (高敬亭) named him Wan Haifeng. And he enlisted in the Communist Youth League of China in 1935. He joined the Chinese Communist Party in October 1937.

In 1949, he participated in the Battle of Menglianggu, the Huaihai Campaign and the Yangtze River Crossing Campaign led by Liu Bocheng and Deng Xiaoping in eastern China.

In 1952, after the outbreak of the Korean War, the Chinese government commissioned him as a deputy division commander of the Chinese People's Volunteers. He returned to China and was awarded the military rank of senior colonel in 1955.

In 1955, Wan entered the PLA National Defence University, where he graduated in 1959. After graduation, he was appointed division commander of PLA Ground Force. In May 1972 he was promoted to become deputy commander of Beijing Military Region, and held that office until October 1975, when he was appointed deputy political commissar and a Party standing committee member. He commanded soldiers to take part in the relief work of the Tangshan Earthquake. He became political commissar of Chengdu Military Region in October 1982, a position he held until April 1990. He attained the rank of general (Shangjiang) in September 1988. He retired in September 1998. Wan was also a member of Central Advisory Commission between 1987 and 1992.

On 2 September 2015, he was hired as the honorary president of Red Army School in Yichang, Hubei.

== Personal life ==
Wan met Zhao Zheng (赵政) in early 1943, when she was a surgeon. Their wedding ceremony was held in October that same year. The couple had four children.

Zhao Zheng died on 16 September 2019, aged 96. Wan died on 31 March 2023, at the age of 102.

== Awards ==
- Order of Bayi, 3rd Class
- Order of Independence and Freedom, 2nd Class
- Order of Liberation, 2nd Class
- Honor Merit Medal of Red Star, 2nd

Military offices
Preceded by Xu Liqing	Political Commissar of Chengdu Military Region; 1982–1990	Succeeded by Gu Shanqing
