= Zhang Guoying =

Chinese politician

- 张帼英

Chairwoman of Guangdong Provincial People's Congress
- In office February 2001 – January 2003
- Preceded by: Zhu Senlin
- Succeeded by: Lu Zhonghe

First Secretary of Secretariat of the All-China Women's Federation
- In office September 1983 – February 1990
- Leader: Kang Keqing; Chen Muhua
- Preceded by: Guo Liwen
- Succeeded by: Huang Qizao

Personal details
- Born: March 1937 (age 89) Dongguan County, Guangdong, China
- Party: Chinese Communist Party

Chinese name
- Simplified Chinese: 张帼英
- Traditional Chinese: 張幗英
Transcriptions
Standard Mandarin
- Hanyu Pinyin: Zhāng Guóyīng

Zhang Guoying (Chinese: 张帼英; born March 1937) is a Chinese politician who served as chairwoman of Guangdong Provincial People's Congress from 2001 to 2003.

She was a member of the 12th, 13th and 14th Central Committee of the Chinese Communist Party. She was a representative of the 12th, 13th, 14th, and 15th National Congress of the Chinese Communist Party. She was a delegate to the 9th National People's Congress.

== Biography ==
Zhang was born in Dongguan County (now Dongguan), Guangdong, in March 1937.

Zhang joined the Chinese Communist Party (CCP) in December 1954. Zhang worked in Guangdong Provincial Posts and Telecommunications Administration from 1951 to 1957 and then Hainan Autonomous Prefecture Post and Telecommunications Bureau from 1957 to 1966. In 1966, she was appointed deputy party secretary of Baoting County, she remained in that position until 1973, when she was transferred to Renhua County and appointed party secretary. She was made deputy party secretary of Huiyang Prefecture (now Huiyang District of Huizhou) in 1982, but having held the position for only one year.

In September 1983, Zhang was promoted to become first secretary of Secretariat of the All-China Women's Federation.

Zhang was chosen as deputy party secretary of Guangdong in 1990. In January 1998, she became vice chairwoman of Guangdong Provincial People's Congress, rising to chairwoman in February 2001.

Party political offices
Preceded by Guo Liwen	First Secretary of Secretariat of the All-China Women's Federation; 1983–1990	Succeeded by Huang Qizao
Government offices
Preceded by Zhu Senlin	Chairwoman of Guangdong Provincial People's Congress; 2001–2003	Succeeded by Lu Zhonghe
