= Li Laizhu =

Chinese general (1932–2023)

- 李来柱

Commander of the Beijing Military Region
- In office December 1993 – November 1997
- Preceded by: Wang Chengbin
- Succeeded by: Li Xinliang

Personal details
- Born: 10 October 1932 Shen County, Shandong, China
- Died: 12 March 2023 (aged 90) Beijing, China
- Party: Chinese Communist Party
- Education: PLA Military and Political University; Shijiazhuang Second Senior Infantry School

Military service
- Allegiance: People's Republic of China
- Branch/service: People's Liberation Army Ground Force
- Years of service: 1944–1997
- Rank: General
- Battles/wars: Second Sino-Japanese War; Chinese Civil War; Sino-Vietnamese War

Chinese name
- Simplified Chinese: 李来柱
- Traditional Chinese: 李來柱
Transcriptions
Standard Mandarin
- Hanyu Pinyin: Lǐ Láizhù

Li Laizhu (Chinese: 李来柱; 10 October 1932 – 12 March 2023) was a general (shangjiang) of the People's Liberation Army (PLA). He was a member of the 14th Central Committee of the Chinese Communist Party. He was a delegate to the 7th National People's Congress and a member of the Standing Committee of the 9th National People's Congress.

== Biography ==
Li was born in Shen County, Shandong, on 10 October 1932. He enlisted in the Eighth Route Army in May 1944, and joined the Chinese Communist Party (CCP) in June 1948. During the Chinese Civil War, he engaged in the Liaobo campaign, Pinghan campaign, Huaihai campaign, Yangtze River Crossing campaign, Shanghai Campaign, and Chengdu campaign. In 1961, he graduated from the Shijiazhuang Second Senior Infantry School. In December 1993, he was promoted to become commander of the Beijing Military Region, a position he held until November 1997.

Li was promoted to the rank of lieutenant general (zhongjiang) in September 1988 and general (shangjiang) in May 1994.

Li died on 12 March 2023 in Beijing, at the age of 90.

== Publications ==
- 李来柱上将回忆录 [Memoirs of General Li Laizhu] (in Chinese). Beijing: Central Literature Publishing House. 2008. ISBN 9787507325690.
- 李来柱诗记 [Poems of Li Laizhu] (in Chinese). Beijing: China Youth Publishing House. 2018. ISBN 9787515351841.

Military offices
Preceded by Wang Chengbin	Commander of the Beijing Military Region; 1993–1997	Succeeded by Li Xinliang
