= 14th Central Committee =

14th Central Committee may refer to:

- Central Committee of the 14th Congress of the All-Union Communist Party (Bolsheviks), 1925–1927
- 14th Central Committee of the Chinese Communist Party, 1992–1997
- 14th Central Committee of the Romanian Communist Party, 1989
