= 14th Central Committee of the Chinese Communist Party =

The 14th Central Committee of the Chinese Communist Party was in session from 1992 to 1997. It held seven plenary sessions. It was preceded by the 13th Central Committee. It was elected by the 14th National Congress of the Chinese Communist Party and in turn elected the 14th Politburo of the Chinese Communist Party.

== Members ==
In stroke order of surnames:

1. Ding Wenchang (丁文昌)
2. Ding Guangen (丁关根)
3. Ding Henggao (丁衡高)
4. Yu Yongbo (于永波)
5. Wang Ke (王克)
6. Wang Tao (王涛)
7. Wang Hai (王海)
8. Wang Qun (王群)
9. Wang Hanbin (王汉斌)
10. Wang Chengbin (王成斌)
11. Wang Zhaoguo
12. Wang Maolin (王茂林)
13. Wang Zhongyu
14. Wang Weicheng (王维澄)
15. Wang Chaowen (王朝文)
16. Wang Senhao (王森浩)
17. Wang Ruilin (王瑞林)
18. Mao Zhiyong (毛致用)
19. Wuliji (乌力吉)
20. Yin Kesheng (尹克升)
21. Deng Hongxun (邓鸿勋)
22. Ai Zhisheng (艾知生)
23. Lu Rongjing (卢荣景)
24. Ye Liansong (叶连松)
25. Ye Xuanping (叶选平)
26. Tian Jiyun
27. Tian Zengpei (田曾佩)
28. Shi Yuxiao (史玉孝)
29. Bai Lichen (白立忱)
30. Bai Qingcai (白清才)
31. Ismail Amat (司马义·艾买提)
32. Cheng Kejie (成克杰)
33. Lü Feng (吕枫)
34. Lü Peijian (吕培俭)
35. Zhu Xun (朱训)
36. Zhu Guangya (朱光亚)
37. Zhu Senlin (朱森林)
38. Zhu Dunfa (朱敦法)
39. Zhu Rongji
40. Qiao Shi
41. Wu Shaozu (伍绍祖)
42. Ren Jianxin
43. Hua Guofeng
44. Quan Shuren (全树仁)
45. Doje Cering (多吉才让)
46. Liu Zhongyi (刘中一)
47. Liu Zhengwei (刘正威)
48. Liu Zhongli (刘仲藜)
49. Liu Huaqing
50. Liu Anyuan (刘安元)
51. Liu Jiyuan (刘纪原)
52. Liu Zhongde (刘忠德)
53. Liu Jianfeng (刘剑锋)
54. Liu Jingsong (刘精松)
55. Qi Huaiyuan (齐怀远)
56. Guan Guangfu (关广富)
57. Jiang Zemin
58. Ruan Chongwu
59. Sun Weiben (孙维本)
60. Li Jing (李景)
61. Li Peng
62. Li Jiulong (李九龙)
63. Li Changchun
64. Li Wenqing (李文卿)
65. Li Laizhu (李来柱)
66. Li Lanqing
67. Li Boyong (李伯勇)
68. Li Xilin (李希林)
69. Li Jijun (李际均)
70. Li Qiyan (李其炎)
71. Li Zemin (李泽民)
72. Li Guixian (李贵鲜)
73. Li Tieying (李铁映)
74. Li Ruihuan
75. Li Dezhu (李德珠)
76. Yang Zhengwu (杨正午)
77. Yang Baibing (杨白冰)
78. Yang Guoliang (杨国梁)
79. Yang Dezhong (杨德中)
80. Wu Yi
81. Wu Wenying (吴文英)
82. Wu Bangguo
83. Wu Guanzheng
84. He Guangyuan (何光远)
85. He Zhukang (何竹康)
86. He Chunlin (何椿霖)
87. Tong Baocun (佟宝存)
88. Gu Shanqing (谷善庆)
89. Zou Jiahua (邹家华)
90. Wang Jialiu (汪家鏐)
91. Shen Daren (沈达人)
92. Song Jian (宋健)
93. Song Hanliang (宋汉良)
94. Song Keda (宋克达)
95. Song Qingwei (宋清渭)
96. Song Defu (宋德福)
97. Chi Haotian
98. Zhang Gong (张工)
99. Zhang Zhen (张震)
100. Zhang Dinghua (张丁华)
101. Zhang Wannian
102. Zhang Lichang (张立昌)
103. Zhang Lianzhong (张连忠)
104. Zhang Boxing (张勃兴)
105. Zhang Siqing
106. Zhang Meiyuan (张美远)
107. Zhang Guoying (张帼英)
108. Zhang Fusen
109. Chen Yuying (陈玉英)
110. Chen Bangzhu (陈邦柱)
111. Chen Guangyi (陈光毅)
112. Chen Xitong
113. Chen Kuiyuan (陈奎元)
114. Chen Junsheng (陈俊生)
115. Chen Minzhang (陈敏章)
116. Chen Huanyou (陈焕友)
117. Chen Jinhua (陈锦华)
118. Chen Muhua (陈慕华)
119. Shao Huaze (邵华泽)
120. Shao Qihui (邵奇惠)
121. Lin Liyun (林丽韫)
122. Gu Hui (固辉)
123. Luo Gan
124. He Zhiqiang (和志强)
125. Yue Qifeng
126. Zhou Nan (周南)
127. Zhou Wenyuan (周文元)
128. Zhou Yushu (周玉书)
129. Zhou Guangzhao (周光召)
130. Zhou Keyu (周克玉)
131. Zheng Bijian (郑必坚)
132. Zhao Zhihao (赵志浩)
133. Zhao Nanqi (赵南起)
134. Zhao Fulin (赵富林)
135. Hao Jianxiu (郝建秀)
136. Hu Ping (胡平)
137. Hu Qili
138. Hu Fuguo (胡富国)
139. Hu Jintao
140. Hou Jie (侯捷)
141. Hou Zongbin (侯宗宾)
142. Jiang Chunyun (姜春云)
143. Yuan Weimin
144. Raidi (热地)
145. Jia Qinglin
146. Jia Zhijie (贾志杰)
147. Jia Chunwang
148. Gu Xiulian (顾秀莲)
149. Gu Jinchi (顾金池)
150. Qian Zhengying (钱正英)
151. Qian Qichen
152. Tömür Dawamat (铁木尔·达瓦买提)
153. Ni Zhifu (倪志福)
154. Xu Huizi (徐惠滋)
155. Gao Yan (高严)
156. Gao Tianzheng (高天正)
157. Gao Dezhan (高德占)
158. Guo Zhenqian (郭振乾)
159. Guo Chaoren (郭超人)
160. Tao Siju
161. Huang Ju
162. Huang Huang (黄璜)
163. Huang Qizao (黄启璪)
164. Huang Zhendong (黄镇东)
165. Cao Shuangming (曹双明)
166. Cao Pengsheng (曹芃生)
167. Qi Yuanjing (戚元靖)
168. Cui Naifu (崔乃夫)
169. Liang Dongcai (梁栋材)
170. Wei Jianxing (尉健行)
171. Peng Peiyun (彭珮云)
172. Ge Hongsheng (葛洪升)
173. Jiang Xinxiong (蒋心雄)
174. Jiang Minkuan (蒋民宽)
175. Jiang Zhuping (蒋祝平)
176. Han Zhubin
177. Cheng Weigao (程维高)
178. Fu Quanyou (傅全有)
179. Fu Xishou (傅锡寿)
180. Lu Ping (鲁平)
181. Pu Chaozhu (普朝柱)
182. Wen Jiabao
183. Xie Fei (谢非)
184. Xie Shijie (谢世杰)
185. Lei Mingqiu (雷鸣球)
186. Lu Yongxiang (路甬祥)
187. Liao Hui (廖晖)
188. Tan Shaowen (谭绍文)
189. Wei Jinshan (魏金山)

== Brief chronology ==
1. 1st Plenary Session
  - Date: October 19, 1992
  - Location: Beijing
  - Significance: Jiang Zemin was elected General Secretary and Chairman of the Central Military Commission. A 22-members Politburo, a 7-members Politburo Standing Committee and a 5-members Secretariat were elected. Hu Jintao entered the Politburo Standing Committee for the first time as its youngest member.
2. 2nd Plenary Session
  - Date: March 5–7, 1993
  - Location: Beijing
  - Significance: The meeting approved some economic measures, a program for institutional reform, and lists of nominees for top posts of the 8th National People's Congress and the 8th National Committee of the Chinese People's Political Consultative Conference.
3. 3rd Plenary Session
  - Date: November 11–14, 1993
  - Location: Beijing
  - Significance: A Decision of the CCP Central Committee on Certain Issues in Establishing a Socialist Market Economy System was adopted, fostering the establishment of private enterprises. This clearly echoed Deng Xiaoping's Southern Tour in 1992, when the still-powerful paramount leader had criticized the slowness of economic reform after the 1989 Tian'anmen Square protests. In the area of social security, the Decision called for mandatory individual accounts for each employee.
4. 4th Plenary Session
  - Date: September 25–28, 1994
  - Location: Beijing
  - Significance: The meeting was focused on improving Party leadership in the period of socialism with Chinese characteristics. It was first asserted that collective leadership based on generational succession was to be enhanced: Deng Xiaoping was proclaimed as the leader of the "second generation", and Jiang Zemin as the leader of the "third generation". This principle was later laid down in the Party Constitution.
5. 5th Plenary Session
  - Date: September 25–28, 1995
  - Location: Beijing
  - Significance: Guidelines for the 9th Five-Year Plan and other socio-economic programs were adopted. Chen Xitong, rival to Jiang Zemin as leader of the dubbed "Beijing clique", was accused of corruption, removed from his posts of Politburo member, Central Committee member, National People's Congress delegate and party secretary of Beijing, and arrested. Defense Minister Chi Haotian was appointed CMC vice-chairman. Deng Xiaoping Theory was first mentioned in the official communique.
6. 6th Plenary Session
  - Date: October 7–10, 1996
  - Location: Beijing
  - Significance: Meeting focused on building socialist spiritual civilization. The concept of Deng Xiaoping Theory was further elaborated as the Party's basic guideline for the primary stage of socialism via socialism with Chinese characteristics, and was raised to the same level as Marxism-Leninism and Mao Zedong Thought.
7. 7th Plenary Session
  - Date: September 6–9, 1997
  - Location: Beijing
  - Significance: Preparations for the Party's 15th National Congress were made. This was also the first meeting held after Deng Xiaoping's death.
