= Wang Chengbin =

Wang Chengbin, may refer to:

- Wang Chengbin (general, born 1874), an ethnic Manchu Chinese general of the Warlord Era of the Republic of China.
- Wang Chengbin (general, born 1928), a lieutenant general (zhongjiang) of the People's Liberation Army (PLA).
