= Jiang Futang =

- 姜福堂

Political Commissar of the Shenyang Military Region
- In office September 1995 – December 2005
- Preceded by: Li Xinliang
- Succeeded by: Huang Xianzhong

Director of Political Department of the Chengdu Military Region
- In office December 1993 – September 1995
- Preceded by: Zheng Xianbin
- Succeeded by: Yang Defu

Director of Political Department of the Jinan Military Region
- In office June 1985 – December 1993
- Preceded by: Xu Chunyang
- Succeeded by: Tan Naida

Personal details
- Born: October 1941 (age 84–85) Rongcheng County, Shandong, China
- Party: Chinese Communist Party
- Education: PLA Political College; Shandong University; PLA National Defence University

Military service
- Allegiance: People's Republic of China
- Branch/service: People's Liberation Army Ground Force
- Years of service: 1959–2005
- Rank: General
- Battles/wars: Sino-Vietnamese War

Jiang Futang (Chinese: 姜福堂; pinyin: Jiāng Fútáng; born October 1941) is a general (shangjiang) of the People's Liberation Army (PLA). He was a representative of the 13th and 14th National Congress of the Chinese Communist Party. He was a member of the 15th and 16th Central Committee of the Chinese Communist Party. He was a member of the Standing Committee of the 11th National People's Congress.

== Biography ==
Jiang was born in the town of Tengjia, in Rongcheng County (now Rongcheng), Shandong, in October 1941.

He enlisted in the People's Liberation Army (PLA) in January 1959, and joined the Chinese Communist Party (CCP) in May 1960. In August 1976, he rose to become director of Political Department of the 26th Group Army, and then political commissar in May 1983. In January 1985, he was appointed political commissar of the 67th Group Army. During his tenure, he participated in the Sino-Vietnamese War. In June 1985, he was appointed director of Political Department of the Jinan Military Region, he remained in that position until December 1993, when he was transferred to the Chengdu Military Region and appointed deputy political commissar and director of Political Department. He became political commissar of the Shenyang Military Region in September 1995, and served until December 2005. In March 2008, he was made vice chairperson of the National People's Congress Foreign Affairs Committee.

He was promoted to the rank of major general (shaojiang) in September 1988, lieutenant general (zhongjiang) in July 1993 and general (shangjiang) in June 2002.

Military offices
Preceded by Xu Chunyang	Political Commissar of the 26th Group Army; 1983–1985	Succeeded by Zhang Wentai
Preceded by Zhou Keyu	Political Commissar of the 67th Group Army; 1985	Succeeded by Li Guangsheng
Preceded by Xu Chunyang	Director of Political Department of the Jinan Military Region; 1985–1993	Succeeded by Tan Naida
Preceded by Zheng Xianbin	Director of Political Department of the Chengdu Military Region; 1993–1995	Succeeded by Yang Defu
Preceded by Li Xinliang	Political Commissar of the Shenyang Military Region; 1995–2005	Succeeded by Huang Xianzhong
