= Gao Tianzheng =

Chinese general (1931–2022)

- 高天正

Director of Political Department of the Guangzhou Military Region
- In office February 1988 – April 1990
- Preceded by: Zhang Mingyuan
- Succeeded by: Fang Zuqi

Personal details
- Born: January 1931 Tong County, Hebei, China
- Died: 26 January 2022 (aged 90–91) Guangzhou, Guangdong, China
- Party: Chinese Communist Party

Military service
- Allegiance: People's Republic of China
- Branch/service: People's Liberation Army Ground Force
- Years of service: 1948–2003
- Rank: Lieutenant general
- Commands: Guangzhou Military Region
- Battles/wars: Chinese Civil War; Korean War

Gao Tianzheng (Chinese: 高天正; pinyin: Gāo Tiānzhèng; January 1931 – 26 January 2022) was a lieutenant general in the People's Liberation Army of China who served as director of Political Department of the Guangzhou Military Region from 1988 to 1990.

He was a delegate to the 7th National People's Congress. He was a member of the 9th National Committee of the Chinese People's Political Consultative Conference. He was a member of the 14th Central Committee of the Chinese Communist Party.

== Biography ==
Gao was born in Tong County, Hebei (now Tongzhou District of Beijing), in January 1931.

He enlisted in the People's Liberation Army (PLA) in 1948, and joined the Chinese Communist Party (CCP) the following year. He was present at the Pingjin campaign and the Yangtze River Crossing campaign during the Chinese Civil War. After the establishment of the Communist State, in 1950, he took part in the Korean War. He was appointed director of Political Department of the Guangzhou Military Region in February 1988, and served until May 1990, when he was made deputy political commissar. He retired in July 2003.

He was promoted to the rank of major general (shaojiang) in 1988 and lieutenant general (zhongjiang) in 1990.

On 26 January 2022, he died of an illness in Guangzhou, Guangdong, at the age of 90.

Military offices
Preceded by Zhang Mingyuan	Director of Political Department of the Guangzhou Military Region; 1988–1990	Succeeded by Fang Zuqi
