= Zhang Gong =

Zhang Gong may refer to:

- Zhang Gong (footballer) (born 1992), Chinese footballer
- Zhang Gong (general) (born 1935), officer in the People's Liberation Army of China
- Zhang Gong (politician) (born 1961), Chinese politician and the current mayor of Tianjin
