= Liao Xilong =

Chinese army general (1940–2026)

- 廖锡龙

Head of the People's Liberation Army General Logistics Department
- In office November 2002 – October 2012
- Preceded by: Wang Ke
- Succeeded by: Zhao Keshi

Commander of Chengdu Military Region
- In office 1995 – November 2002
- Preceded by: Wei Fulin
- Succeeded by: Wang Jianmin

Personal details
- Born: 4 June 1940 Sinan, Guizhou, China
- Died: 23 January 2026 (aged 85)
- Party: Chinese Communist Party

Military service
- Allegiance: People's Republic of China
- Branch/service: People's Liberation Army Ground Force
- Years of service: 1959–2013
- Rank: General
- Battles/wars: Sino-Vietnamese War; Sino-Vietnamese conflicts (1979–1991)

Liao Xilong (simplified Chinese: 廖锡龙; traditional Chinese: 廖錫龍; pinyin: Liào Xílóng;4 June 1940 – 23 January 2026) was a general in the Chinese People's Liberation Army.

== Life and career ==
Liao was born in Sinan, Guizhou Province. He enlisted in the People's Liberation Army (PLA) in January 1959, and joined the Chinese Communist Party (CCP) in February 1963. He graduated from the Basic Department of the Military Academy of the PLA in 1981.

He was elevated to the deputy commander of the Chengdu Military Region in 1985. He spent months studying national defense at PLA National Defense University in 1986. He was promoted to the position of commander of the Chengdu Military Region and the CCP Deputy Committee Secretary there in 1995. From 1999 to 2001, he took graduate classes in Sociology at Peking University. In 2002, he was appointed the director of the General Logistics Department of the PLA and a member of the Central Military Commission of the CCP, and a year later, of the state.

Liao was a member of the 15th, 16th and 17th Central Committee of the Chinese Communist Party.

Liao died on 23 January 2026, at the age of 85.

Military offices
Preceded by Wei Fulin	Commander of Chengdu Military Region; 1995–2002	Succeeded by Wang Jianmin
Preceded by Wang Ke	Head of the People's Liberation Army General Logistics Department; 2002–2012	Succeeded by Zhao Keshi
