= Zhang Zhijian =

Chinese general (born 1934)

- 张志坚

Political Commissar of the Chengdu Military Region
- In office December 1993 – May 1999
- Preceded by: Zhang Gong
- Succeeded by: Yang Deqing

Commander of the PLA Beijing Garrison
- In office November 1992 – December 1993
- Preceded by: Dong Xuelin
- Succeeded by: He Daoquan

Personal details
- Born: May 1934 (age 92) Wenxi County, Shanxi, China
- Party: Chinese Communist Party
- Education: People's Volunteer Army Staff School

Military service
- Allegiance: People's Republic of China
- Branch/service: People's Liberation Army Ground Force
- Years of service: 1951–1999
- Rank: General
- Battles/wars: Korean War

Chinese name
- Simplified Chinese: 张志坚
- Traditional Chinese: 張志堅
Transcriptions
Standard Mandarin
- Hanyu Pinyin: Zhāng Zhìjiān

Zhang Zhijian (born May 1934) is a general (shangjiang) of the People's Liberation Army (PLA) of China.

== Biography ==
Zhang was born in 1934 in Wenxi, Shanxi. He joined the PLA in 1951. In 1992 he became the deputy commander of the Beijing Military Region, and he later served as Political Commissar of the Chengdu Military Region. He attained the rank of major general in 1988, lieutenant general in 1990, and full general in 1998.

Military offices
Preceded by Dong Xuelin	Commander of the PLA Beijing Garrison; 1992–1993	Succeeded by He Daoquan
Preceded by Zhang Gong	Political Commissar of the Chengdu Military Region; 1993–1999	Succeeded by Yang Deqing
