= Huang Qizao =

Chinese politician

- 黄启璪

First Secretary of Secretariat of the All-China Women's Federation
- In office February 1990 – March 1998
- Leader: Chen Muhua
- Preceded by: Zhang Guoying
- Succeeded by: Gu Xiulian

Personal details
- Born: 23 November 1933 Changde, Hunan, China
- Died: 28 December 2000 (aged 67) Beijing, China
- Party: Chinese Communist Party
- Education: Southwest University

Chinese name
- Simplified Chinese: 黄启璪
- Traditional Chinese: 黃啟璪
Transcriptions
Standard Mandarin
- Hanyu Pinyin: Huáng Qǐzǎo

Huang Qizao (Chinese: 黄启璪; 23 November 1933 – 28 December 2000) was a Chinese politician who served as first secretary of Secretariat of the All-China Women's Federation from 1990 to 1998.

She was a member of the 14th and 15th Central Committee of the Chinese Communist Party. He was a delegate to the 7th and a member of the Standing Committee of the 9th National People's Congress.

== Biography ==
Huang was born in Changde, Hunan, on 23 November 1933, while her ancestral home in Mudong, Ba County, Sichuan (now Banan District, Chongqing). She secondary studied at Chongqing Shuren High School. In 1951, she entered Southwest Normal University, majoring in physics.

Huang joined the Chinese Communist Party (CCP) in 1952, and got involved in politics in 1954, when he was assigned to the Chongqing Municipal Committee of the Communist Youth League of China. She eventually became its secretary in 1973. She was deputy director of Chongqing Education Bureau in 1979, deputy director of the Sichuan Provincial Cultural Bureau in 1982, and vice chairperson of the Sichuan Provincial Committee of the Chinese People's Political Consultative Conference and secretary-general of the CCP Sichuan Provincial Committee in 1982.

Huang was chosen as vice chairperson of the All-China Women's Federation in 1988 and party branch secretary in 1993.

In 1998, Huang took office as vice chairperson of the National People's Congress Environment Protection and Resources Conservation Committee.

On 28 December 2000, Huang died from an illness in Beijing, at the age of 67.

Party political offices
Preceded by Zhang Guoying	First Secretary of Secretariat of the All-China Women's Federation; 1990–1998	Succeeded by Gu Xiulian
