= Zhang Haiyang =

Chinese general (born 1949)

- 张海阳

Political Commissar of the Second Artillery Corps
- In office December 2009 – December 2014
- Preceded by: Peng Xiaofeng
- Succeeded by: Wang Jiasheng

Political Commissar of the Chengdu Military Region
- In office 2005 – December 2009
- Preceded by: Liu Shutian
- Succeeded by: Tian Xiusi

Personal details
- Born: July 1949 (age 77) Shanghai, China
- Party: Chinese Communist Party
- Relations: Zhang Zhen (father)

Military service
- Allegiance: Chinese Communist Party; People's Republic of China
- Branch/service: PLA Second Artillery Corps; PLA Ground Force
- Years of service: 1969–2014
- Rank: General
- Battles/wars: Battle of Laoshan

Chinese name
- Traditional Chinese: 張海陽
- Simplified Chinese: 张海阳
Transcriptions
Standard Mandarin
- Hanyu Pinyin: Zhāng Hǎiyáng
Wu
- Wugniu: Tsan^{1} He^{5}-yan^{6}
Hakka
- Romanization: Zong^{1} Hoi^{3}-yong^{2}

Zhang Haiyang (Chinese: 张海阳; born July 1949) is a retired general in the People's Liberation Army (PLA) of China, who served as political commissar of the PLA Second Artillery Corps.

== Biography ==
Zhang was born in Shanghai in July 1949, of Pingjiang, Hunan ancestry. He is the son of General Zhang Zhen, who was a member of the Central Military Commission. The Zhang family had moved to Pingjiang, Hunan from the Hakka county of Pingyuan, Guangdong. His father-in-law is Sun Keji, a major general and former vice political commissar of the Nanjing Military Region.

Zhang enlisted in the PLA in 1969, and served as a soldier in the Lanzhou Military Region. In the 1980s, he participated in the Battle of Laoshan during the Sino-Vietnamese border conflicts, when he was the political commissar of the 61st Division of the 21st Group Army. He attained the rank of major general in 1995. In 2002, he was promoted to deputy political commissar of the Beijing Military Region, and became a lieutenant general the next year.

In 2005, Zhang was promoted to political commissar of the Chengdu Military Region, replacing General Liu Shutian, who had reached retirement age. During the Great Sichuan earthquake of 2008, Zhang Haiyang, together with Chengdu MR commander Li Shiming, coordinated the military relief efforts. He was promoted to the rank of full general (shang jiang) in July 2009, and Zhang Zhen and Zhang Haiyang became the first pair of father-and-son full generals in the PLA (Zhang Zongxun and Zhang Youxia are another pair). In late 2009, he replaced retiring General Peng Xiaofeng as the 10th political commissar of the Second Artillery Corps, China's strategic missile force. He retired in late 2014, and was succeeded by Wang Jiasheng.

Zhang was a member of the 17th Central Committee of the Chinese Communist Party, and is a member of the 18th Central Committee.
