= Xiong Zhaoren =

Chinese military officer (1912–2019)

Xiong Zhaoren (Chinese: 熊兆仁; February 1912 – 7 April 2019) was a Chinese Communist military officer who fought in the Chinese Civil War and the Second Sino-Japanese War. His role in the 1949 Yangtze River Crossing Campaign was adapted into the 1954 film Reconnaissance Across the Yangtze directed by Tang Xiaodan. He was awarded the rank of major general in 1955 and served as deputy chief of staff of the Fuzhou Military Region. He lived to the age of 107, the longest-lived founding general of the People's Republic of China.

== Wartime career ==
Xiong was born in February 1912 in Yongding, Fujian, Republic of China. He enlisted in the Chinese Red Army in 1929, joined the Communist Youth League of China in 1931, and became a member of the Chinese Communist Party (CCP) in 1933. After the Red Army went on the Long March toward Yan'an in North China, Xiong remained in the south and fought a guerrilla war against the Kuomintang government for three years.

The Chinese Civil War was suspended with the start of the Second Sino-Japanese War in 1937, and Xiong joined the CCP's New Fourth Army and fought against Japan. Starting as a company commander in the Fourth Regiment of the army, he rose through the ranks to become battalion commissar, chief of staff of the New Third Regiment, political commissar of the 47th Regiment, and deputy commander of the Third Military Subdistrict of the Jiangsu-Zhejiang Military District.

After the surrender of Japan in 1945, the Chinese Civil War soon resumed. During the second phase of the war, Xiong served as commander of the Jiangsu-Zhejiang-Anhui border region, and later as deputy commander of the South Anhui Military District. His forces played a major role in the Yangtze River Crossing Campaign of 1949.

== People's Republic of China ==
After the founding of the People's Republic of China in 1949, Xiong served as deputy commander of the North Anhui Military District, chief of staff of an army corps, and deputy chief of staff of the Fujian Military District. He received the rank of major general in 1955, when the PRC awarded military ranks to its founding generals, and served as deputy chief of staff of the Fuzhou Military Region from 1959 to 1966. He disappeared from public life during the Cultural Revolution (1966–1976). After re-emerging in 1977, he again served as deputy chief of staff of the Fuzhou Military Region from 1980 to 1982.

After Xiong retired in 1983, he repeatedly lobbied the national government to invest in infrastructure in the poverty-stricken areas of western Fujian, and helped win approval for the construction of the Meizhou-Kanshi railway (梅坎铁路) and the Ganzhou–Longyan railway in the region.

By the time Xiong celebrated his 107th birthday (108th in East Asian age reckoning) in February 2019, he had become the longest-living of China's founding generals. He died at the 900 Hospital of the PLA Joint Logistic Support Force in Fuzhou on 7 April 2019.

== Legacy ==
Xiong's role in the 1949 Yangtze Crossing Campaign is celebrated in the 1954 film Reconnaissance Across the Yangtze (渡江侦察记), directed by Tang Xiaodan. He is the prototype of the leader of the People's Liberation Army unit glorified in the film, which became a major hit in the 1950s. It won the Chinese government's Best Film Award in 1957 and was remade in colour during the Cultural Revolution.
