= Zhang Yang (general) =

Chinese general

- 张阳
- Zhang Yang

Director-general of the Political Work Department of the Central Military Commission
- In office November 2015 – August 2017
- Preceded by: New title
- Succeeded by: Miao Hua

Director-general of the People's Liberation Army General Political Department
- In office October 2012 – November 2015
- Preceded by: Li Jinai
- Succeeded by: Position revoked

Political Commissar of the Guangzhou Military Region
- In office September 2007 – October 2012
- Preceded by: Yang Deqing
- Succeeded by: Wei Liang

Personal details
- Born: August 1951 Wuqiang County, Hebei, China
- Died: November 23, 2017 (aged 66) Beijing, China
- Party: Chinese Communist Party
- Education: PLA National Defence University

Military service
- Allegiance: People's Republic of China
- Branch/service: People's Liberation Army Ground Force
- Years of service: 1968–2017
- Rank: General (stripped in 2018)

Chinese name
- Simplified Chinese: 张阳
- Traditional Chinese: 張陽
Transcriptions
Standard Mandarin
- Hanyu Pinyin: Zhāng Yáng

Zhang Yang (Chinese: 张阳; pinyin: Zhāng Yáng; August 1951 – November 23, 2017) was a general in the Chinese People's Liberation Army (PLA) who served as Director of the Political Work Department. He was previously political commissar of the Guangzhou Military Region. He committed suicide in November 2017 while under disciplinary investigation.

== Biography ==
Zhang was born in Wuqiang County, Hebei Province. He graduated from the basic department of PLA National Defense University, and also studied at the Central Party School of the Chinese Communist Party, majoring in administrative management. He was the director of the political department and a standing committee member of the CCP committee of the Guangzhou Military Region. From September 2007 to December 2015, he was political commissar and Chinese Communist Party Committee Secretary of the Guangzhou Military Region. He attained the rank of lieutenant general in July 2006 and general in July 2010.

Zhang was a member of the 17th and 18th Central Committee of the Chinese Communist Party and a deputy to the 10th National People's Congress.

Zhang Yang was under investigation by the Central Military Commission on August 28, 2017, for discipline violations and bribery. He is believed to have committed suicide at his home on November 23, 2017, making him the most senior military figure to have done so during the ongoing graft investigations among PLA personnel. On October 16, 2018, Zhang Yang was posthumously stripped of his rank and expelled from the CCP.

Military offices
Preceded by Tang Zhaochuan	Director of the Political Department of the 42nd Group Army; 2000–2002	Succeeded by Liu Changyin
Preceded by Deng Hanmin	Political Commissar of the 42nd Group Army; 2002–2005	Succeeded by Yue Shixin
Preceded by Yang Deqing	Director of the Political Department of the Guangzhou Military Region; 2004–2007	Succeeded by Zheng Weiping
Preceded by Yang Deqing	Political Commissar of the Guangzhou Military Region; 2007–2012	Succeeded by Wei Liang
Preceded by Li Jinai	Director-general of People's Liberation Army General Political Department; 2012–2015	Succeeded by Position revoked
New title	Director-general of the Political Work Department of the Central Military Commission; 2015–2017	Succeeded by Miao Hua
