= Nie Fengzhi =

Chinese general

- 聂凤智
- Born: September 7, 1913; Dawu County, Hubei, Republic of China
- Died: April 3, 1992 (aged 78); Nanjing, Jiangsu, China
- Military career
- Allegiance: China
- Branch: People's Liberation Army Air Force
- Rank: General
- Commands: People's Volunteer Army Air Force; East China Air Force; Zhejiang Front Command Air Force; Fujian Front Command Air Force; Nanjing Military Region; • Deputy Commander, 1975–1977; • Commander, 1977–1982
- Conflicts: Korean War; First Taiwan Strait Crisis; • Battle of Yijiangshan Islands; Second Taiwan Strait Crisis

Nie Fengzhi (simplified Chinese: 聂凤智; traditional Chinese: 聶鳳智; pinyin: Niè Fèngzhì; 7 September 1913 – 3 April 1992) was a general of the People's Liberation Army Air Force (PLAAF) of the People's Republic of China.

== Biography ==
Nie was born in Dawu County, Hubei in 1913 or 1914. He belonged to the dominant Han ethnic group.

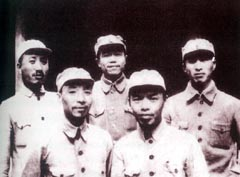
Nie (L3) in a group photograph taken during the Second Sino-Japanese War

Nie served in the People's Liberation Army (PLA) from 1929 until his retirement. He was involved in founding the PLAAF, and commanded the PLA's first aerial unit, the 4th Mixed Aviation Brigade, which was established on 19 June 1950 in Nanjing and consisted of 155 aircraft in one attack, one bomber, and two fighter regiments. He attained the rank of lieutenant general in 1955.

=== Korean War ===
In 1951, following China's entry into the Korean War, Nie commanded the East China Military Region Air Force and the People's Volunteer Army's short-lived Bomber Command at Dongfeng in Jilin province. After Liu Zhen returned to China in July 1952, Nie commanded the PLAAF in Korea.

=== Taiwan Strait Crises ===
At the time of the First Taiwan Strait Crisis, Nie commanded the East China (Huadong) Air Force. During the Crisis, he served as vice-commander of the Zhejiang Front Command (ZFC)—established in 1954 by order of Mao Zedong and led by Zhang Aiping—and commanded the ZFC air force. He was one of the architects of the campaign to capture the Dachen Islands from the Republic of China. During a meeting of the ZFC commanders on 31 August 1954, Nie opposed the "majority opinion" favoring an immediate amphibious invasion of Dachen, and instead supported the "limited piecemeal tactics" proposed by Zhang. The resulting "Zhang-Nie plan" involved a focus on Yijiangshan Island, north of Dachen, and led to the Battle of Yijiangshan Islands in January 1955. During the course of the campaign, Nie personally spoke with every PLA pilot participating in operations in order to convey the order issued by the Central Military Commission to avoid direct confrontation with American air forces.

During the Second Taiwan Strait Crisis in 1958, Nie served as commander of the Fujian Front Command air force.

=== Nanjing Military Region ===
From 1975 to 1977, Nie served as Deputy Commander of the PLA's Nanjing Military Region and was a member of the Standing Committee of the Chinese Communist Party Committee of the Nanjing Military Region. He became the Commander of the military region and Secretary of the Standing Committee in 1977, and remained in these posts until 1982. He was also a member of the 11th Central Committee of the Chinese Communist Party, which was in session from 1977 to 1982.

=== Death ===
Nie died in 1992.

== Selected publications ==
- Nie Fengzhi; et al. (1985). Sanjun huige zhan Donghai [Three services wield weapons in East China Sea combat] (in Chinese). Beijing: PLA Press.
- Nie Fengzhi. Zhanchang: jiangjun de yaolan (in Chinese).
- Nie Fengzhi. "Coordination with Army and Navy forces during the liberation of Yijiangshan Island". Lantian Zhi Lu. 2.

Military offices
| New title | Commander of the Air Force of Nanjing Military Region; 1955–1958 | Succeeded by Chen Huatang |
| New title | Commander of the Air Force of Fuzhou Military Region; 1958–1962 | Succeeded by Chen Huatang |
| Preceded by Chen Huatang | Commander of the Air Force of Nanjing Military Region; 1962–1968 | Succeeded by Liu Maogong |
| Preceded by Ding Sheng | Commander of the Nanjing Military Region; 1977–1982 | Succeeded by Xiang Shouzhi |
