= Xiang Shouzhi =

Chinese general and revolutionist

- 向守志
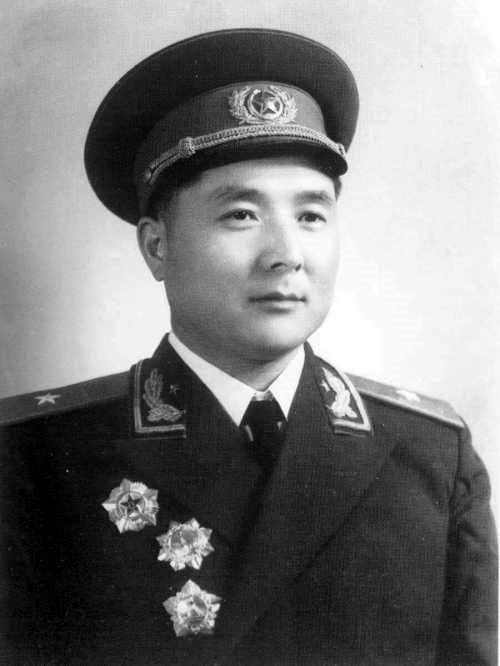
- Xiang Shouzhi in 1955

Member of the 2nd Central Advisory Commission
- In office 1987–1992
- Director: Chen Yun

Commander of the PLA Nanjing Military Region
- In office 1982–1990
- Preceded by: Nie Fengzhi
- Succeeded by: Gu Hui

Commander of the PLA Second Artillery Force
- In office 1975–1977
- Preceded by: Zhang Yixiang (张翼翔)
- Succeeded by: Li Shuiqing (李水清)

President of PLA Rocket Force University of Engineering
- In office 1960–1965

Personal details
- Born: Xiang Shouzhi (向守芝); 28 November 1917 Xuanhan County, Sichuan, China
- Died: 2 September 2017 (aged 99) Nanjing, Jiangsu, China
- Party: Chinese Communist Party
- Spouse: Zhang Ling (m. 1945)
- Children: 4
- Education: Red Army Infantry School; PLA National Defence University

Military service
- Allegiance: People's Republic of China
- Branch/service: People's Liberation Army Ground Force
- Years of service: 1934–1990
- Rank: General
- Battles/wars: Second Sino-Japanese War; Chinese Civil War; Korean War
- Awards: Order of Bayi (Third Class; 1955); Order of Liberation (Second Class Medal; 1955); Order of Independence and Freedom (Second Class Medal; 1963); Order of the Red Star (First Class Medal; 1988)

Xiang Shouzhi (Chinese: 向守志; pinyin: Xiàng Shǒuzhì; 28 November 1917 – 2 September 2017) was a Chinese general and revolutionist. He was promoted to the rank of major general (shao jiang) in 1955 and general (Shang jiang) in 1988. He was a member of the 11th National Congress of the Chinese Communist Party and the 12th CCP Central Committee.

Xiang began to take part in the revolution at the age of 15, and successively participated in the Second Sino-Japanese War, Chinese Civil War and Korean War. He was eventually purged during the Cultural Revolution but later reinstated. He is hailed as founding father of the Chinese ballistic missile forces. Later in his life, he served as commander of the Nanjing Military Region until his retirement in 1990.

== Biography ==
Xiang was born Xiang Shouzhi (向守芝) in Xuanhan County, Sichuan, with his ancestral home in Macheng, Hubei.

In 1933, he joined the Young Pioneers in the Shuanghechang area and served as its captain. In 1934 he enlisted in the Red Army and successively served as soldier, squad leader, and platoon sergeant. In 1935 he took part in the Communist Youth League. He participated in the counter-campaign against "encirclement and suppression" of the Sichuan-Shaanxi Soviet Area; after the war, the Red Army were defeated and he participated in the Long March, a forced expedition over 12,500 km (7,800 mi) in the 1930s. In 1936 he attended the Red Army Infantry School and that same year became a member of the Chinese Communist Party.

After the outbreak of the Second Sino-Japanese War, he assumed various posts in the 129th Infantry Division, including company commander, battalion commander, and regimental commander at the Anti-Japanese Taihang Citadel. He was present at the Battle of Linnan in 1943.

During the Chinese Civil War, he was deputy division leader of the First Squad of the Taihang Military Region. He took part in the Battle of Handan. Then he participated in many campaigns, such as the Battle of North Henan, Battle of East Henan, Battle of Zhengzhou, Crossing River Campaigns, and Southwest Campaign.

In the winter of 1951, he was chief of staff of the Fifteenth Army and participated in the fifth campaign of the Korean War to counter the fall of tactical combat; he suffered head injuries. After the war in 1955 he was awarded the military rank of major general (shao jiang) by Mao Zedong.

In 1958 he was accepted to the PLA National Defence University, where he graduated in 1960. After graduation in June, Prime Minister Zhou Enlai appointed him as president of Xi'an Artillery School (now PLA Rocket Force University of Engineering). During his term in office, the DF-1 missile was launched successfully. In August 1965 the Chinese government commissioned him as deputy commander of the Second Artillery Force. In 1966, Mao Zedong launched the Cultural Revolution. He was promoted to commander on 4 July 1967, but having held the position for only 43 days, he was discharged by Lin Biao because "he's out of Lin's faction". He was sent to prisons and suffered political persecution over the next six years.

He returned to work in 1972 and then was appointed commander and CCP first secretary of the Second Artillery Force. He served as deputy commander of the Nanjing Military Region in September 1977, and five years later promoted to the Commander position, serving in the post until his retirement in 1990. In 1987 he was elected as a member of the 2nd Central Advisory Commission. He was promoted to the rank of general (shang jiang) in 1988. Xiang died on 2 September 2017, in Nanjing, at age 99.

== Work ==
- Xiang Shouzhi (1 May 2006). 向守志回忆录 [Memoirs of Xiang Shouzhi] (in Chinese). Beijing: Chinese People's Liberation Army Publishing House. ISBN 9787506551328.

== Personal life ==
Xiang married Zhang Ling (张玲, born in 1919 in Kaifeng, Henan) in Pingdong County of Shandong Province on 25 May 1945. They had four children.

== Military awards ==
- Order of Bayi (Third Class; 1955)
- Order of Liberation (Second Class Medal; 1955)
- Order of Independence and Freedom (Second Class Medal; 1963)
- Order of the Red Star (First Class Medal; 1988)

Military offices
Preceded by Zhang Yixiang (张翼翔)	Commander of the PLA Second Artillery Force; 1975–1977	Succeeded by Li Shuiqing (李水清)
Preceded by Nie Fengzhi	Commander of the PLA Nanjing Military Region; 1982–1990	Succeeded by Gu Hui
