= Song Keda =

- 宋克达

Political Commissar of the Shenyang Military Region
- In office November 1987 – December 1993
- Preceded by: Liu Zhenhua
- Succeeded by: Li Xinliang

Personal details
- Born: 5 July 1928 Yancheng County, Jiangsu, China
- Died: 17 September 1995 (aged 67) Shenyang, Liaoning, China
- Party: Chinese Communist Party
- Education: Central Party School of the Chinese Communist Party

Military service
- Allegiance: People's Republic of China
- Branch/service: People's Liberation Army Ground Force
- Years of service: 1944–1993
- Rank: Lieutenant general
- Battles/wars: Second Sino-Japanese War; Chinese Civil War; Korean War

Chinese name
- Simplified Chinese: 宋克达
- Traditional Chinese: 宋克達
Transcriptions
Standard Mandarin
- Hanyu Pinyin: Sòng Kèdá

Song Chongkuan
- Chinese: 宋崇宽
Transcriptions
Standard Mandarin
- Hanyu Pinyin: Sòng Chóngkuān

Song Keda (Chinese: 宋克达; 5 July 1928 – 17 September 1995) was a lieutenant general (zhongjiang) of the People's Liberation Army (PLA). He was a delegate to the 6th National People's Congress. He was an alternate member of the 13th Central Committee of the Chinese Communist Party and a member of the 14th Central Committee of the Chinese Communist Party.

== Biography ==
Song was born Song Chongkuan (宋崇宽) in Yancheng County (now Yancheng), Jiangsu, on 5 July 1928.

He enlisted in the New Fourth Army in August 1944, and joined the Chinese Communist Party (CCP) in March 1945. He served in the 39th Group Army before being transferred to Shenyang Military Region in 1954. In 1964, he was reassigned to the 39th Group Army, where he was promoted to become deputy director of its Political Department in 1970 and political commissar in May 1983. In June 1985, he became deputy political commissar of Shenyang Military Region, rising to political commissar in November 1987. He attained the rank of lieutenant general (zhongjiang) in September 1988.

On 17 September 1995, he died of an illness in Shenyang, Liaoning, at the age of 67.

Military offices
Preceded by Liu Zhenhua	Political Commissar of the Shenyang Military Region; 1987–1993	Succeeded by Li Xinliang
