= Liu Shutian =

- 刘书田

Political Commissar of Chengdu Military Region
- In office December 2003 – December 2005
- Preceded by: Yang Deqing
- Succeeded by: Zhang Haiyang

Political Commissar of Guangzhou Military Region
- In office August 1998 – December 2003
- Preceded by: Shi Yuxiao
- Succeeded by: Yang Deqing

Personal details
- Born: December 1940 (age 85) Teng County, Shandong, China
- Party: Chinese Communist Party
- Education: PLA Nanjing Political College

Military service
- Allegiance: People's Republic of China
- Branch/service: People's Liberation Army Ground Force
- Years of service: 1958–2005
- Rank: General

Chinese name
- Simplified Chinese: 刘书田
- Traditional Chinese: 劉書田
Transcriptions
Standard Mandarin
- Hanyu Pinyin: Liú Shūtián

Liu Shutian (Chinese: 刘书田; born December 1940) is a general in the People's Liberation Army of China. He was a member of the 15th and 16th Central Committee of the Chinese Communist Party.

== Biography ==
Liu was born in Teng County (now Tengzhou), Shandong, in December 1940. He enlisted in the People's Liberation Army (PLA) in December 1958 and joined the Chinese Communist Party (CCP) in June 1960. In 1992, he graduated from the PLA Nanjing Political College. In December 1994, he became deputy political commissar of Guangzhou Military Region, rising to political commissar in August 1998. He became political commissar of Chengdu Military Region in December 2003, and served until December 2005.

He was promoted to the rank of major general (shaojiang) in August 1988, lieutenant general (zhongjiang) in July 1996, and general (shangjiang) in June 2002.

Military offices
Preceded by Shi Yuxiao	Political Commissar of Guangzhou Military Region; 1998–2003	Succeeded by Yang Deqing
Preceded by Yang Deqing	Political Commissar of Chengdu Military Region; 2003–2005	Succeeded by Zhang Haiyang
