= Liu Zhenhua =

Chinese general and diplomat (1921–2018)

- 刘振华
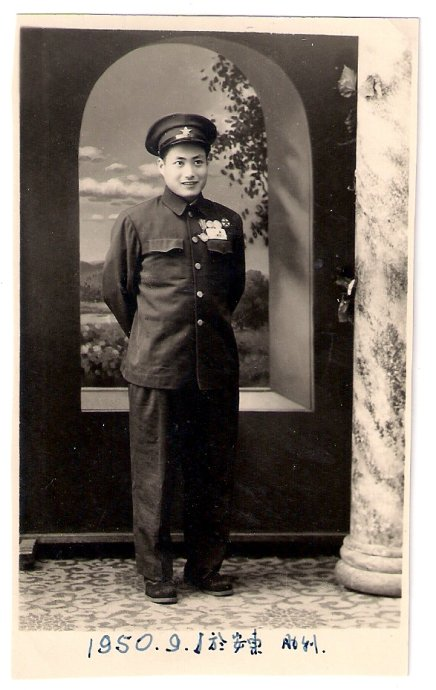
- Liu Zhenhua in 1950

Political Commissar of the Beijing Military Region
- In office November 1987 – April 1990
- Preceded by: Yang Baibing
- Succeeded by: Zhang Gong

Political Commissar of the Shenyang Military Region
- In office October 1982 – November 1987
- Preceded by: Liao Hansheng
- Succeeded by: Song Keda

Ambassador of China to Albania
- In office February 1971 – May 1976
- Preceded by: Geng Biao
- Succeeded by: Liu Xinquan

Personal details
- Born: Liu Peiyi; 8 July 1921 Tai'an County, Shandong, China
- Died: 11 July 2018 (aged 97) Beijing, China
- Party: Chinese Communist Party

Military service
- Allegiance: People's Republic of China
- Branch/service: People's Liberation Army Ground Force
- Years of service: 1938–1990
- Rank: General

Chinese name
- Simplified Chinese: 刘振华
- Traditional Chinese: 劉振華
Transcriptions
Standard Mandarin
- Hanyu Pinyin: Liú Zhènhuá

Liu Peiyi
- Simplified Chinese: 刘培一
- Traditional Chinese: 劉培一
Transcriptions
Standard Mandarin
- Hanyu Pinyin: Liú Péiyī

Liu Zhenhua (Chinese: 刘振华; 8 July 1921 – 11 July 2018) was a general (shangjiang) of the Chinese People's Liberation Army and a diplomat of the People's Republic of China. He served as ambassador to Albania and Deputy Foreign Minister.

== Biography ==
He was born in Tai'an, Shandong on July 8, 1921. He joined the Chinese Communist Party in 1938. He was a veteran of the Second Sino-Japanese War, Chinese Civil War and Korean War. He made significant contributions to the victories of the Battle of Jinzhou against Kuomintang forces of Liao Yaoxiang and the Pingjin Campaign against Kuomintang forces of Fu Zuoyi. He was an alternate member of the 9th Central Committee of the Chinese Communist Party and a delegate to the 8th National People's Congress. In 1964, he was promoted to major general. He was ambassador of China to Albania from 1971 to 1976. As an ambassador, he made improvement to China–Greece relations by establishing diplomatic relations with Greece on June 6, 1972. In March 1979, he was made deputy political commissar of the Shenyang Military Region and political commissar of the Shenyang Military Region in October 1982. In 1987, he was transferred to the Beijing Military Region as its political commissar, holding that post until 1990. During his tenure in Beijing, he received his current rank of Shang Jiang in 1988.

Diplomatic posts
Preceded by Geng Biao	Ambassador of China to Albania; 1971–1976	Succeeded by Liu Xinquan
Military offices
Preceded by Liao Hansheng	Political Commissar of the Shenyang Military Region; 1982–1987	Succeeded by Song Keda
Preceded by Yang Baibing	Political Commissar of the Beijing Military Region; 1987–1990	Succeeded by Zhang Gong
