= Yang Deqing =

Chinese retired general

- 杨德清

Political Commissar of the Guangzhou Military Region
- In office 2003–2007
- Preceded by: Liu Shutian
- Succeeded by: Zhang Yang

Political Commissar of the Chengdu Military Region
- In office 1999–2003
- Preceded by: Zhang Zhijian
- Succeeded by: Liu Shutian

Personal details
- Born: September 1942 (age 84) Yingcheng County, Hubei, China
- Party: Chinese Communist Party
- Education: PLA Political College

Military service
- Allegiance: People's Republic of China
- Branch/service: People's Liberation Army Ground Force
- Years of service: 1963–2007
- Rank: General

Chinese name
- Simplified Chinese: 杨德清
- Traditional Chinese: 楊德清
Transcriptions
Standard Mandarin
- Hanyu Pinyin: Yáng Déqīng

Yang Deqing (Chinese: 杨德清; born September 1942) is a retired general in the People's Liberation Army of China. He was a member of the 16th Central Committee of the Chinese Communist Party. He was a member of the Standing Committee of the 11th National People's Congress.

== Biography ==
Yang was born in Yingcheng County (now Yingcheng), Hubei, in September 1942. He enlisted in the People's Liberation Army (PLA) in December 1963, and joined the Chinese Communist Party (CCP) in October 1964. From February 1974 to March 1977, he was a secretary of the Secretariat of the Political Department of Wuhan Military District. Then he was assigned to the People's Liberation Army Ground Force. In August 1985, he was promoted to become director of the Political Department of the 42nd Group Army, a position he held until October 1989, when he was appointed director of the Political Department of PLA Academy of Military Economics. He was political commissar of PLA Academy of Military Economics in June 1990, but having held the position for only a year and a half. He was appointed director of the Political Division of People's Liberation Army General Logistics Department, in December 1991, becoming deputy political commissar and secretary of Discipline Inspection Commission in December 1994. In May 1999, he was commissioned as political commissar of the Chengdu Military Region, he remained in that position until 2003, when he was transferred to Guangzhou Military Region and chosen as political commissar. In March 2008, he took office as vice chairperson of the National People's Congress Overseas Chinese Affairs Committee.

He was promoted to the rank of major general (shaojiang) in July 1990, lieutenant general (zhongjiang) in July 1996, and general (shangjiang) in June 2004.

Military offices
Preceded by Zhang Xiangge	Political Commissar of the PLA Army Service Academy; 1990–1991	Succeeded by Zhang Zhengyi
Preceded by Wang Yongsheng	Director of the Political Division of the People's Liberation Army General Logistics Department; 1991–1994	Succeeded by Jia Runxing
Preceded by Zhang Zhijian	Political Commissar of the Chengdu Military Region; 1999–2003	Succeeded by Liu Shutian
Preceded by Liu Shutian	Political Commissar of the Guangzhou Military Region; 2003–2007	Succeeded by Zhang Yang
