= Qinghai Military District =

- 中国人民解放军青海省军区
- Founded: January 1949; 76 years ago
- Country: People's Republic of China
- Allegiance: Chinese Communist Party
- Type: Military district
- Role: Command and control
- Part of: People's Liberation Army
- Headquarters: Xining, Qinghai

Commanders
- Commander: Major general (shaojiang) Liu Geping
- Political Commisar: Major general (shaojiang) Yang Longxi

Chinese name
- Simplified Chinese: 中国人民解放军青海省军区
- Traditional Chinese: 中國人民解放軍青海省軍區
Transcriptions
Standard Mandarin
- Hanyu Pinyin: Zhōngguó Rénmín Jiěfàngjūn Qīnghǎishěng Jūnqū

The Qinghai Military District (Chinese: 中国人民解放军青海省军区; full name People's Liberation Army Qinghai Military District or PLA Qinghai Military District) was a military district of the National Defense Mobilization Department of the Central Military Commission in China.

== History ==
Qinghai Military District was founded in January 1949.

== Leaders ==
=== Commanders ===
Name (English)	Name (Chinese)	Tenure begins	Tenure ends	Note
He Bingyan	贺炳炎	October 1949	May 1952	
Zhang Zhongliang	张仲良	July 1952	October 1954	
Gao Langting	高朗亭	May 1955	July 1960	
Sun Guang	孙光	July 1960	December 1962	
Liu Xianquan	刘贤权	February 1963	March 1968	
Zhang Jianglin	张江霖	July 1969	May 1977	
Wu Shengrong	伍生荣	June 1977	May 1983	
Xie Quanwei	解全威	May 1983	August 1985	
Qiu Shuxian	邱述先	August 1985	September 1988	
Ji Zhanbin	季占斌	November 1988	September 1992	
Fang Denghua	方登华	September 1992	March 1993	
Zhang Meiyuan	张美远	March 1993	May 1996	
Lan Zhongjie	兰仲杰	May 1996	2003	
Zhang Yueyong	张岳永	2003	February 2006	
Zhang Zhiqiang	张志强	February 2006	July 2008	
Zhang Shusong	张书领	July 2008	December 2012	
Sha Jun	沙军	January 2013	December 2013	
Li Songshan	李松山	December 2013	April 2017	
Qu Xinyong	曲新勇	April 2017	April 2020	
Liu Geping	刘格平	May 2020		

=== Political commissars ===
Name (English)	Name (Chinese)	Tenure begins	Tenure ends	Note
Wu Yude	武玉德	December 2010	July 2014	
Li Ning	李宁	July 2014	May 2018	
Wang Xiufeng	王秀峰	May 2018	October 2020	
Yi Shuqiang	衣述强	October 2020	December 2023	
Yang Longxi	杨龙溪	December 2023		
