= Li Jing (PRC general) =

Commander of the People's Liberation Army Naval Air Force (1930–2022)

- 李景

Commander of the People's Liberation Army Naval Air Force
- In office August 1983 – April 1990
- Preceded by: Zeng Kelin
- Succeeded by: Wang Xugong

Member of the National People's Congress (7th)
- In office October 1988 – October 1993
- Constituency: Beijing

Personal details
- Born: 1 March 1930 Teng County, Shandong, China
- Died: 30 December 2022 (aged 92) Beijing, China
- Party: Chinese Communist Party
- Education: PLA Air Force Aviation School

Military service
- Allegiance: People's Republic of China
- Branch/service: People's Liberation Army Ground Force (1946–1949); People's Liberation Army Air Force (1949–1955); People's Liberation Army Navy (1955–1990); People's Liberation Army Ground Force (1990–1995)
- Years of service: 1946–1995
- Rank: General
- Battles/wars: Chinese Civil War; Korean War

Li Jing (Chinese: 李景; pinyin: Lǐ Jǐng; 1 March 1930 – 30 December 2022) was a Chinese general in the People's Liberation Army who served as commander of the People's Liberation Army Naval Air Force from 1983 to 1990.

Li was a delegate to the 7th National People's Congress. He was a member of the Standing Committee of the 9th Chinese People's Political Consultative Conference. He was a member of the 14th Central Committee of the Chinese Communist Party.

== Biography ==
Li was born in the town of Hongxu, Teng County (now Tengzhou), Shandong, on 1 March 1930. He enlisted in the People's Liberation Army (PLA) in 1946, and joined the Chinese Communist Party (CCP) in September 1949.

During the Chinese Civil War, Li served in the war and engaged in the Menglianggu campaign, Southwest Shandong campaign, and Yanzhou campaign.

After the founding of the Communist State in 1949, the Communist government set up the People's Liberation Army Air Force and founded the PLA Air Force Aviation School, in which Li was trained to fly fighters. He participated in the Korean War after graduation.

In 1955, Li was transferred to the People's Liberation Army Naval Air Force, where he successively served as captain, deputy regimental commander, regimental commander, deputy division commander, and division commander. He was promoted to become deputy chief of staff of the People's Liberation Army Navy in July 1973. In 1980, he was made deputy commander of the People's Liberation Army Naval Air Force, and before long he became deputy commander of the People's Liberation Army Navy. He was commissioned as commander of the People's Liberation Army Naval Air Force in August 1983, and served until April 1990. In November 1992, he was appointed deputy chief of the general staff of the People's Liberation Army General Staff Department, serving in the post until his retirement in July 1995.

Li was promoted to the rank of vice admiral (zhongjiang) in 1988, and general (shangjiang) in May 1994.

Li died on 30 December 2022 in Beijing, at the age of 92, from COVID-19.

Military offices
Preceded by Zeng Kelin	Commander of the People's Liberation Army Naval Air Force; 1983–1990	Succeeded by Wang Xugong
