= Ge Zhenfeng =

Chinese general

- 葛振峰

President of the PLA Academy of Military Sciences
- In office July 2001 – November 2002
- Preceded by: Wang Zuxun
- Succeeded by: Zhang Dingfa

Personal details
- Born: October 1944 (age 81) Qingyuan County, Hebei, China
- Party: Chinese Communist Party

Military service
- Allegiance: People's Republic of China
- Branch/service: People's Liberation Army Ground Force
- Years of service: 1962–2004
- Rank: General

Ge Zhenfeng (Chinese: 葛振峰; pinyin: Gě Zhènfēng; born October 1944) is a retired general of China's People's Liberation Army.

== Biography ==
Born in Qingyuan County (now Qingyuan District, Baoding), Hebei, Ge joined the PLA in June 1962 and the Chinese Communist Party in July 1965. In 1984, he became the vice chief of staff of PLA army corps. In 1988, he was promoted to chief of staff of 39th army corps. He became the commander of 64th army corps in 1992. In November 1996, he was elevated to chief of staff of PLA Shenyang Military Region. He became vice commander of Shenyang MR in January 1999. In December 2000, he was appointed as vice president of PLA National Defense University. In July 2001, he became the president of PLA Academy of Military Science. From November 2002 to December 2009, he has served as executive vice chief of staff in General Staff Department of PLA.

He was made lieutenant general in 1998, and awarded the rank of general on 20 June 2004.

Military offices
Preceded by Wang Zuxun	President of the PLA Academy of Military Sciences; 2001–2002	Succeeded by Zhang Dingfa
