= Wang Jiasheng =

Chinese general

General Wang Jiasheng
- 王家胜

Political Commissar of the PLA Rocket Force
- In office December 2014 – July 2020
- Preceded by: Zhang Haiyang
- Succeeded by: Xu Zhongbo

Personal details
- Born: January 1955 (age 71) Liaoyang, Liaoning, China
- Party: Chinese Communist Party

Military service
- Allegiance: China
- Branch/service: PLA Rocket Force
- Years of service: ?–2020
- Rank: General

Chinese name
- Simplified Chinese: 王家胜
- Traditional Chinese: 王家勝
Transcriptions
Standard Mandarin
- Hanyu Pinyin: Wáng Jiāshèng

Wang Jiasheng (Chinese: 王家胜; born January 1955) is a retired general (Shangjiang) of the People's Liberation Army (PLA) of China. He was Political Commissar of the PLA Rocket Force (previously known as the Second Artillery Force) from 2014 to 2020. He is now vice chairperson of the National People's Congress Supervisory and Judicial Affairs Committee.

== Biography ==
Wang was born in January 1955 in Liaoyang, Liaoning. He studied at the National University of Defense Technology. He formerly served as a political officer in the PLA General Armaments Department (GAD), where he held posts including deputy director and director of the Political Department, and deputy political commissar. In December 2014, he was appointed political commissar of the PLA Second Artillery Force, replacing General Zhang Haiyang, who had retired.

Wang Jiasheng was made a member of the 18th Central Commission for Discipline Inspection in November 2012, and was promoted to the rank of lieutenant general in August 2013. On July 28, 2017, Wang was promoted to the rank of general.

In October 2017, he was elected as a member of the 19th Central Committee of the Chinese Communist Party.

Military offices
Preceded by Wang Jianjun	Political Commissar of Xichang Satellite Launch Center; 2006–2009	Succeeded by Sun Baowei
Preceded by Huang Zuoxing	Deputy Political Commissar of the People's Liberation Army General Armaments Department; 2011–2014	Succeeded by Chai Shaoliang
Preceded by Zhang Haiyang	Political Commissar of the People's Liberation Army Rocket Force; 2014–2020	Succeeded by Xu Zhongbo
