= Xu Huizi =

20th-century Chinese general

- 徐惠滋

President of the PLA Military Sciences Academy
- In office July 1995 – November 1997
- Political Commissar: Zhang Gong
- Preceded by: Zhao Nanqi
- Succeeded by: Liu Jingsong

Personal details
- Born: 9 December 1932 Penglai County, Shandong, China
- Died: 5 January 2005 (aged 72) Beijing, China
- Party: Chinese Communist Party

Military service
- Allegiance: Republic of China (before 1948); People's Republic of China (1949–1998)
- Branch/service: National Revolutionary Army (before 1948); People's Liberation Army Ground Force (1948–1998)
- Years of service: 1948–1998
- Rank: General
- Battles/wars: Chinese Civil War; Korean War

Xu Huizi (Chinese: 徐惠滋; pinyin: Xú Huìzī; 9 December 1932 – 5 January 2005) was a general in the People's Liberation Army of China who served as president of the PLA Military Sciences Academy from 1995 to 1997.

He was a member of the 12th, 13th and 14th Central Committee of the Chinese Communist Party. He was a member of the Standing Committee of the 9th National People's Congress.

== Biography ==
Xu was born in Penglai County (now Penglai District of Yantai), Shandong, on 9 December 1932. He was a soldier of the Republic of China Armed Forces before being captured by the Fourth Field Army during the Liaoshen campaign. He was conscripted into the People's Liberation Army (PLA) in 1948, and joined the Chinese Communist Party (CCP) in 1950. During the late Chinese Civil War, he was present at the Pingjin campaign, the Hengbao campaign, and the Guangxi campaign.

After founding of the Communist State, in 1950, he participated in the Korean War. In 1985, he was promoted to deputy chief of the People's Liberation Army General Staff Department, he remained in that position until July 1995, when he was appointed president of the PLA Military Sciences Academy.

He was promoted to the rank of lieutenant general (zhongjiang) in 1988 and general (shangjiang) in 1994.

On 5 January 2005, he died from an illness in Beijing, at the age of 72.

Educational offices
Preceded by Zhao Nanqi	President of the PLA Military Sciences Academy; 1995–1997	Succeeded by Liu Jingsong
