= Insubordination in the PLA during the 1989 Tiananmen Square protests and massacre =

The 1989 Tiananmen Square protests and massacre saw a massive redeployment of People's Liberation Army (PLA) troops into and around Beijing. After the declaration of martial law, the Central Military Commission (CMC) mobilized at least 22 divisions from 13 Armies, which converged on Beijing. This force far exceeded the local garrison, with troops being sent in from across China. Altogether, roughly 300,000 troops were involved in the campaign to quell the protests. By their end, the PLA had proven that it was largely willing to enforce party decrees with lethal force. Multiple significant breaches of military discipline occurred after the imposition of martial law. Some cases involved officers or entire units being unwilling to obey directives from farther up the chain of command, others related to the misuse of military equipment, and some were responsible for casualties incurred during the night of June 3 (when the PLA finally reached Tiananmen Square).

It is unclear when, how, or even if some PLA units received orders to open fire on the protesters, and so knowing whether or not an incident amounts to insubordination is difficult. If the PLA as a whole received orders to use lethal force, CMC chairman Deng Xiaoping must have given his assent to it. CMC vice-chairman and President Yang Shangkun's orders to the Central Military Commission on the 20th of May 1989 explicitly deny troops the authority to use lethal force during martial law, even when their lives are threatened by the protesters. According to Li Xinming's report to the politburo on June 19 however, 10 PLA soldiers did end up dying, along with 13 from the People's Armed Police. For these 23 dead, they inflicted 218 deaths on the protesters, although some sources place this number in the thousands.

== Insubordination by officers ==
During the initial mobilisation of the units tasked with quelling the unrest, Xu Qinxian, commander of the 38th Group Army, refused to order his army to mobilise. He explained that his refusal to mobilise was as a result of having received a verbal command to do so from the Central Military Commission, but not having received one in writing. His refusal continued when he became aware that CCP general secretary Zhao Ziyang had not given his approval for declaring martial law. Xu was quickly replaced, and the 38th Group Army carried out its mobilisation under a replacement commander. The "Xu Qinxian Incident" was held by the CMC as an object lesson. Xu's refusal was held to be incompatible with the values of the PLA, and proved the need for "ideological purification".

Xu Feng, commander of the 116th Division (39th Group Army), refused to push his troops into central Beijing, staying instead in the less chaotic eastern suburbs. Xu ceased to communicate with his superiors by radio, pretending that it was malfunctioning. As a result, the 116th division did not participate in any violent confrontations with the protesters.

== Insubordination by enlisted soldiers ==
Chen Guang was a military photographer during the 1989 Tiananmen Protests. His unit was stationed in north-western Hebei province until the protests began to intensify in early May, when it was ordered to move to the outskirts of Beijing. When shortly thereafter, martial law was declared in urban Beijing, Chen's unit was among those mobilised to regain control of the capital. Approaching from the west, the column was among those halted by protesters, which ended with a humiliating withdrawal a few days later. During these tense few days, marooned amidst a sea of protesters, military discipline broke down. Contact with protesters and residents of Beijing sapped the will of the troops to follow their orders, and the food and water offered to them, in lieu of their absent army rations, further diminished their will to act against the protesters. After the withdrawal, the troops spend 10 days under intense re-indoctrination.

It was during their second attempt to enter Beijing on the night of June 3, wearing civilian clothes, when Chen and his comrades were able to make it to their objective in the Great Hall of the People on the western side of Tiananmen Square. Chen's battalion was later sent to recapture a lost busload of weapons, but were immediately blocked by protesters. Chen's battalion retreated into the Great Hall of the People, and were shortly thereafter issued ammunition for their rifles, approximately 200 rounds per man. Insufficient trigger-discipline, combined with nervousness resulted in multiple accidental discharges of these now loaded weapons, although it is unclear if any casualties resulted from this. This level of ineptness, at least partly due to the inexperience that Chen describes in this unit, indicates that Deng Xiaoping's "Strategic Decision" of 1985, to reduce the overall size of the PLA in favor of more rigorous training and education, was still far from implemented.

A soldier of the 38th Group Army, Wang Yongli, claims that his unit began shooting at protesters out of frustration. After firing shots into the air, in response to brick and bottle throwing by the crowd, the troops became enraged and fired into the crowd. According to him: "No one said to shoot, but it was, like, We're going to teach them a lesson, and then those soldiers unleashed their fury, You pulled the trigger and bang, bang, bang, it was like rain, the noise shaking the heavens." The high-rise apartment blocks along Chang'an Boulevard, leading to Tiananmen Square, were subjected to indiscriminate gunfire from the troops below.

Documentary evidence of the Tiananmen Square protests, specifically film of the protests and the crackdown, seems to confirm Chen's narrative about the first attempt of the PLA to reach the square. The well-known documentary The Gate of Heavenly Peace, primarily composed of footage taken during the protests, provides a visual account of the events. In it, PLA soldiers are surrounded and forced to retreat on their first attempt to reach the square, but it shows that the second attempt succeeded when PLA soldiers were willing to open fire on the crowd. It is uncertain, however, if these troops actually received orders that allowed them to use lethal force.

== Works cited ==
- Tiananmen Papers, Compiled by Zhang Liang (New York: PublicAffairs, 2001).
- Quelling the people: The military suppression of the Beijing Democracy movement, Timothy Brook (New York: Oxford University Press, 1992).
- The People's Republic of Amnesia, Louisa Lim (New York: Oxford University Press, 2014).
- The People in the PLA, Roy Kamphausen, Andrew Scobell, Travis Tanner ed. (Carlisle: Strategic Studies Institute, 2008).
- The aftermath of the 1989 Tiananmen Crisis in mainland China, Bih-Jaw Lin ed. (London: Westview Press, 1992).
- "Tales of Army Discord show Tiananmen Square in New Light", Andrew Jacobs and Chris Buckley, 2014.
- The Gate of Heavenly Peace, Richard Gordon and Carma Hinton, ITVS, 1995.
