= Wang Zuxun =

- 王祖训

President of the PLA Academy of Military Sciences
- In office December 1998 – July 2001
- Preceded by: Liu Jingsong
- Succeeded by: Ge Zhenfeng

Personal details
- Born: May 1936 (age 90) Qujing County, Yunnan, China
- Party: Chinese Communist Party
- Education: PLA Military Academy

Military service
- Allegiance: People's Republic of China
- Branch/service: People's Liberation Army Ground Force
- Years of service: 1951–2001
- Rank: General
- Battles/wars: Sino-Vietnamese War

Chinese name
- Simplified Chinese: 王祖训
- Traditional Chinese: 王祖訓
Transcriptions
Standard Mandarin
- Hanyu Pinyin: Wáng Zǔxùn

Wang Zuxun (Chinese: 王祖训; born May 1936) is a general in the People's Liberation Army of China.

He was a delegate to the 8th National People's Congress and a member of the Standing Committee of the 10th National People's Congress.

== Biography ==
Wang was born in Qujing County (now Qujing), Yunnan, in May 1936. He enlisted in the People's Liberation Army (PLA) in June 1951, and joined the Chinese Communist Party (CCP) in 1959. He graduated from the PLA Military Academy.

He participated in the Battle of Liangshan (两山战役) during the Sino-Vietnamese War. In September 1985 he was promoted to become commander of the Yunnan Military District, a position he held until 1988, when he was made commander of the 14th Army. In December 1993, he became vice president of the PLA Academy of Military Sciences, rising to president in January 1999.

He attained the rank of major general (shaojiang) in September 1988, lieutenant general (zhongjiang) in December 1993, and general (shangjiang) in June 2000.

Military offices
Preceded by Li Jinqiao	Commander of the Yunnan Military District; 1985–1988	Succeeded by Sun Cuiping
Preceded by Meng Jinxi	Commander of the 14th Army; 1989–1993	Succeeded by Zhu Qi
Preceded by Liu Jingsong	President of the PLA Academy of Military Sciences; 1998–2001	Succeeded by Ge Zhenfeng
