= Fu Quanyou =

Retired PLA General

- 傅全有

Head of PLA General Staff Department
- In office September 1995 – November 2002
- Preceded by: Zhang Wannian
- Succeeded by: Liang Guanglie

Head of the People's Liberation Army General Logistics Department
- In office October 1992 – September 1995
- Preceded by: Zhao Nanqi
- Succeeded by: Wang Ke

Personal details
- Born: November 1930 (age 95) Guo County, Shanxi, China
- Party: Chinese Communist Party
- Education: PLA Higher Military Academy

Military service
- Allegiance: People's Republic of China
- Branch/service: People's Liberation Army Ground Force
- Years of service: 1946–2003
- Rank: General

Fu Quanyou (Chinese: 傅全有; pinyin: Fù Quányǒu; born November 1930) is a retired general of the People's Republic of China.

== Biography ==
Fu was born in Guo County (now Yuanping), Shanxi in 1930. He joined the People's Liberation Army in October 1946, and the Chinese Communist Party in August 1947.

He joined the Chinese People's Volunteer Army in February 1953 and fought in Korea until October 1958 when he returned to China. In 1960 he graduated from the PLA's higher military academy. He became the commander of Chengdu Military Region in June 1985, and the commander of Lanzhou Military Region in May 1990. He was a member of 12th - 15th CCP central committees, and a delegate in the 8th and 9th National People's Congress. He was made lieutenant general (zhongjiang) in 1988 and general (shangjiang) in 1993. From October 1992 to September 1995, he was the director of the General Logistics Department of the PLA. He was promoted to the head of General Staff Department of the PLA in September 1995.

Fu was a member of the Central Military Commission (CMC) from October 1992 until his retirement in March 2003.

== Views ==
Fu viewed the PLA exercises during the 1995-1996 Taiwan Strait crisis as successful. Fu reported to the CMC that the 1995 exercises were "all extremely successful: they attacked the power of the 'Taiwan separatists' represented by Lee Teng-hui, warned the United States as the main outside intervening power, and they were forcefully accompanied by political and diplomatic struggles and were highly praised by the Politburo and the CMC."

During the 1999 NATO bombing of Yugoslavia, the United States bombed the Chinese embassy in Belgrade. Believing that the bombing was intentional, Chinese leadership worried that China was significantly lacking in leverage against the United States. A few weeks after the bombing, Fu contended, "[W]hen dealing with the United States, we must have strength, if we lag behind we will be attacked."

Regarding counterspace weapons, Fu stated in 2000 that "following the development of space weaponry, outer space can be used not only for reconnaissance, warning, guidance, and positioning support for operations on land, at sea, and in the air in the future, it is also becoming an important battlefield for the adversary carrying out space-space and space-ground operations."

Military offices
Preceded by Zhao Nanqi	Head of the People's Liberation Army General Logistics Department; 1992–1995	Succeeded by Wang Ke
Preceded by Zhang Wannian	Head of People's Liberation Army General Staff Department; 1995–2002	Succeeded by Liang Guanglie
