= Li Xinliang =

Chinese military officer (1936–2025)

- 李新良

Commander of the Beijing Military Region
- In office December 1997 – January 2003
- Preceded by: Li Laizhu
- Succeeded by: Zhu Qi

Commander of the Shenyang Military Region
- In office September 1995 – December 1997
- Preceded by: Wang Ke
- Succeeded by: Liang Guanglie

Political Commissar of the Shenyang Military Region
- In office December 1993 – September 1995
- Preceded by: Song Keda
- Succeeded by: Jiang Futang

Personal details
- Born: November 1936 Laiyang County, Shandong, China
- Died: 13 August 2025 (aged 88)
- Party: Chinese Communist Party
- Education: PLA Nanjing Engineering School; PLA Military Academy

Military service
- Allegiance: People's Republic of China
- Branch: People's Liberation Army Ground Force
- Service years: 1953–2003
- Rank: General
- Conflict: Sino-Vietnamese War

Li Xinliang (Chinese: 李新良; pinyin: Lǐ Xīnliáng; November 1936 – 13 August 2025) was a general (shangjiang) of the People's Liberation Army (PLA). He was a member of the 13th and 15th Central Committee of the Chinese Communist Party. Li was a representative of the 14th National Congress of the Chinese Communist Party. He was a delegate to the 9th National People's Congress and a member of the Standing Committee of the 10th National People's Congress.

== Life and career ==
Li was born in Laiyang County (now Laiyang), Shandong in November 1936. He enlisted in the People's Liberation Army (PLA) in August 1953, and joined the Chinese Communist Party (CCP) in October 1956.

After graduating from the PLA Nanjing Engineering School in 1956, he was assigned to the 41st Group Army, where he was promoted to a division commander in 1980. He was commander of Guangxi Military District in May 1983, and held that office until February 1988, when he was appointed deputy commander of Guangzhou Military Region. In December 1993, he was made political commissar of Shenyang Military Region, and served until September 1995, when he was commissioned as commander. In December 1997, he became commander of Beijing Military Region, serving in the post until January 2003. In March 2013, he was appointed vice chairperson of the National People's Congress Supervisory and Judicial Affairs Committee.

He was promoted to the rank of major general (shaojiang) in 1988, lieutenant general (zhongjiang) in 1993 and general (shangjiang) in 1998.

Li died on 13 August 2025, at the age of 88.

Military offices
Preceded by Zhang Xudeng	Commander of the Guangxi Military District; 1983–1988	Succeeded by Xiao Xuchu
Preceded by Song Keda	Political Commissar of the Shenyang Military Region; 1993–1995	Succeeded by Jiang Futang
Preceded by Wang Ke	Commander of the Shenyang Military Region; 1995–1997	Succeeded by Liang Guanglie
Preceded by Li Laizhu	Commander of the Beijing Military Region; 1997–2003	Succeeded by Zhu Qi
