= Xu Qinxian =

Chinese military commander (1935–2021)

- Born: Xu Qinxian; August 1935; Ye County, Shandong, Republic of China
- Died: 8 January 2021 (aged 85); Shijiazhuang, Hebei, China
- Military career
- Allegiance: China
- Branch: People's Liberation Army
- Rank: Major General
- Commands: 38th Group Army; 1st Armored Brigade
- Conflicts: Korean War

Xu Qinxian
- Chinese: 徐勤先
Transcriptions
Standard Mandarin
- Hanyu Pinyin: Xú Qínxiān
- IPA: [ɕǔ tɕʰǐn.ɕjɛ́n]

Xu Qinxian (Chinese: 徐勤先; August 1935 – 8 January 2021) was a Chinese major general of the People's Liberation Army. As commander of the 38th Group Army, he refused the order to use force against demonstrators in Beijing during the 1989 Tiananmen Square protests and massacre. As a result, Xu was court-martialed, jailed for five years and expelled from the Chinese Communist Party. After serving his sentence, he was exiled to Shijiazhuang, Hebei, where he spent the remainder of his life. A video recording of the entire military trial leaked in 2025.

== Early life ==
Xu Qinxian was born in August 1935 in Ye County (now Laizhou), Shandong Province. He was sometimes mistakenly thought to be related to General Xu Haidong.

After the outbreak of the Korean War, he volunteered for the army and was initially rejected because he was underage. He was allowed to enlist after he bit his finger and wrote an appeal in blood. Xu spent 8 months at a People's Liberation Army communications school in Fushun, Liaoning. He later saw combat in the war, starting off as a telegraph operator in a tank regiment in the 38th Group Army.

After returning from Korea, Xu worked as a radio operator and rose through the ranks to command a communications battalion, and serve as a regimental chief of staff. In the 1980s, Xu commanded the 1st Armored Division, and was deputy commander and then commander of the 38th Group Army. The 38th Group Army was a key unit defending Beijing and was based in Baoding, Hebei, about 90 miles south of Beijing. It was the largest, most-mechanized, and best-trained unit of its size in the Chinese military. Xu was a protege of Defense Minister Qin Jiwei, who would also later have reservations about enforcing the crackdown during the 1989 Tiananmen Square protests.

== Refusal of orders during the Tiananmen Square protests ==
In March 1989, Xu was wounded in a grenade training accident and sent to the Beijing Military Region (BMR) Hospital in the capital. According to Chinese journalist Yang Jisheng, Xu was actually hospitalized with kidney stones. While hospitalized, Xu watched the student movement unfold and was moved to tears by media coverage of the student protestors' hunger strike in Tiananmen Square.

According to Yang, Xu was recovering from an operation to remove kidney stones when he was visited on 17 May by Li Laizhu, the deputy military commander of the BMR. Xu was informed of an impending mobilization and declaration of martial law on 19 May, and was asked to express his support as an army commander. Xu said he could not comply with a verbal order to mobilize and demanded to see a written order. When told by Li that it "was wartime" and an order in writing would be provided later, Xu responded that there was no war, and reiterated his refusal to carry out a verbal order. Xu called the BMR's political commissar to inform them of his refusal; privately he told friends that he would rather be executed than to be a criminal to history.

On 18 May, President Yang Shangkun heard of Xu's refusal and could not sleep for days. He consulted with the paramount leader, Deng Xiaoping, who said that a soldier like Xu could not disobey the order. Xu was then arrested in the hospital and taken to be court martialled.

According to The Tiananmen Papers, Yang sent Zhou Yibing, the commander of the BMR, to Baoding to persuade Xu. Xu asked Zhou whether the three principals of the Central Military Commission had approved the martial law order. Zhou replied that while Deng Xiaoping, the chairman, and Yang Shangkun, the vice-chairman, had approved, Zhao Ziyang, the first vice-chairman (and the General Secretary of the CCP), had not. Without Zhao's approval, Xu refused to act on the order and asked for sick leave. His request was not granted but he still refused to report to duty. This face-to-face meeting with Zhou was corroborated by a PLA General interviewed through an associate by The Sydney Morning Herald. According to that source, around 20 May, General Zhou Yibing, the commander of the Beijing Military Region personally delivered orders to Xu at his unit's headquarters in Baoding, Hebei, for his troops to march against the student protests in Tiananmen Square. Xu asked Zhou if the order had been approved by General Secretary Zhao Ziyang, at the time. When told by Zhou that Zhao had not agreed to the orders, Xu refused to march.

According to Wu Renhua, Xu was recalled to BMR headquarters in mid-May and given verbal orders by BMR commander Zhou Yibing and BMR political commissar Liu Zhenhua to enforce martial law against the student demonstrators in Beijing. Xu did not immediately object, but returned to Baoding to arrange logistics for his troops to move to Beijing. He then called the BMR to say he could not command his troops because of his injury and returned to the Beijing Military Region Hospital, where he was arrested.

According to Gao Yu, Xu was summoned to the BMR headquarters a day after refusing his marching orders and had his car hijacked. He was then hidden away overnight from searchers sent from the 38th Group Army, whose leadership was replaced before 4 June.

Xu's defiance fanned fears in the CCP of a rebellion among the military and heightened the belief that the student protesters were a serious threat that had to be eliminated. The 38th Group Army under new leadership proceeded to play a major role in suppressing the demonstrators. Many of Xu Qinxian's former colleagues were promoted for their roles.

== Trial and punishment ==
Xu was court-martialled before a military tribunal in 1990. At his trial, he remained defiant, declaring that "the People's Army has never in its history been used to suppress the people, I absolutely refuse to besmirch this historical record!" A video recording of the full trial was leaked in 2025, confirming previous accounts, including that the order to militarily crush the protests was given orally, without a paper trail. Six hours of footage from Xu's closed-door trial was posted on YouTube, which is blocked in China. Several people posted the video, including Wu Renhua, and experts regard it as authentic. While being questioned in civilian garb, Xu said he declined to be a "sinner to history"; he conceded that the CCP controlled the military, but said that ordering the PLA to attack the demonstrators at Tiananmen Square required deliberation by the National People's Congress.

Xu was expelled from the CCP and sentenced to five years in prison. According to Gao Yu, Xu was transferred from a military detention centre to Qincheng Prison by Yang Baibing of the People's Liberation Army General Political Department to serve his sentence. He served four years in Qincheng Prison and the fifth year in a police hospital. After he served his sentence, he was exiled to Shijiazhuang, Hebei, by Jiang Zemin, the new paramount leader of China. Xu also had his entitlements reduced, as if he had been demoted to the position of a deputy commander of the provincial military division of Hebei Province.

== Life in exile ==
For 20 years, Xu's whereabouts were unknown, until a 2009 article by Asia Weekly reported that he was forbidden from living in Beijing and had been forced to live in Shijiazhuang, Hebei. Asia Weekly also reported that a reference to Xu had been included in an anthology of poetry published by his friend Li Rui in 2007, which went unnoticed by the General Administration of Press and Publication.

In 2011 the Hong Kong newspaper Apple Daily saw him as a guest at the Beijing home of Li in 2011 and briefly interviewed him. Xu talked about his life after Tiananmen, confirming his expulsion from the party, and his treatment as if he was the deputy commander of a military region. Xu also said he had access to news and was able to travel between Beijing and his home in Shijiazhuang. He expressed no regrets about his actions during the Tiananmen protests. The interview provoked government ire and Xu was confined to Shijiazhuang for the rest of his life, where he was kept under constant guard and given a lower quality home to live in.

During Chinese New Year 2016, Xu had a prolonged bout of pneumonia and was hospitalized in the People's Liberation Army Bethune International Peace Hospital in Shijiazhuang. Afterwards, Xu lost vision in his right eye, was left with poor vision in his left eye, became senile, and underwent surgery. He also suffered from cerebral thrombosis, struggled to take care of himself, lost the ability to speak fluently, and lost much of the weight he used to be known for. Around 2019, Xu returned to his home in Shijiazhuang and his condition improved. However, his health began rapidly deteriorating in early 2020.

Xu was married and had a son and a daughter.

Hong Kong media reported in January 2021 that Xu had died on 8 January 2021 after choking on food.
