= Li Jiulong =

Chinese General

- 李九龙

Commander of Chengdu Military Region
- In office September 1991 – October 1994
- Preceded by: Zhang Taiheng
- Succeeded by: Wei Fulin

Commander of Jinan Military Region
- In office June 1985 – April 1990
- Preceded by: Qian Shoukun
- Succeeded by: Zhang Wannian

Personal details
- Born: March 1929 Fengrun County, Hebei, China
- Died: 19 November 2003 (aged 74) Beijing, China
- Party: Chinese Communist Party
- Education: PLA Military Academy; PLA National Defence University

Military service
- Allegiance: People's Republic of China
- Branch/service: People's Liberation Army Ground Force
- Years of service: 1945–2003
- Rank: General
- Battles/wars: Chinese Civil War; Korean War; Sino-Vietnamese War

Chinese name
- Simplified Chinese: 李九龙
- Traditional Chinese: 李九龍
Transcriptions
Standard Mandarin
- Hanyu Pinyin: Lǐ Jiǔlóng

Li Jiulong (Chinese: 李九龙; March 1929 – 19 November 2003) was a general (shangjiang) of the People's Liberation Army (PLA). He was a member of the 12th, 13th and 14th Central Committee of the Chinese Communist Party. He was a delegate to the 9th National People's Congress.

== Biography ==
Li was born in Fengrun County, Hebei, in March 1929. He enlisted in the Eighth Route Army in August 1945, and joined the Chinese Communist Party (CCP) in December of that same year.

During the Chinese Civil War, he served in the Northeast Field Army under Huang Yongsheng and Ding Sheng. He fought under Ding Sheng in the Korean War. For his gallant service at Sino-Vietnamese War he was promoted to commander in 1980. In June 1985, he was promoted to become commander of Jinan Military Region, a position he held until April 1990, when he was appointed deputy head of the People's Liberation Army General Logistics Department. He became commander of Chengdu Military Region in September 1991, and served until October 1994.

On 19 November 2003, he died of an illness in Beijing, at the age of 74.

He was promoted to the rank of lieutenant general (zhongjiang) in September 1988 and general (shangjiang) in May 1994.

Military offices
Preceded by Qian Shoukun	Commander of Jinan Military Region; 1985–1990	Succeeded by Zhang Wannian
Preceded by Zhang Taiheng	Commander of Chengdu Military Region; 1991–1994	Succeeded by Wei Fulin
