= Gu Hui (general) =

Chinese general (1930–2013)

- 固辉

Commander of the Nanjing Military Region
- In office April 1990 – January 1996
- Preceded by: Xiang Shouzhi
- Succeeded by: Chen Bingde

Personal details
- Born: October 1930 Gai County, Liaoning, China
- Died: 10 September 2013 (aged 82) Nanjing, Jiangsu, China
- Party: Chinese Communist Party

Military service
- Allegiance: People's Republic of China
- Branch/service: People's Liberation Army Ground Force
- Years of service: 1947–2013
- Rank: General
- Battles/wars: Chinese Civil War; Korean War; Sino-Vietnamese War

Chinese name
- Simplified Chinese: 固辉
- Traditional Chinese: 固輝
Transcriptions
Standard Mandarin
- Hanyu Pinyin: Gù Huī

Gu Hui
- Simplified Chinese: 顾辉
- Traditional Chinese: 顧輝
Transcriptions
Standard Mandarin
- Hanyu Pinyin: Gù Huī

Gu Jianye
- Simplified Chinese: 顾建业
- Traditional Chinese: 顧建業
Transcriptions
Standard Mandarin
- Hanyu Pinyin: Gù Jiànyè

Gu Hui (Chinese: 固辉; October 1930 – 10 September 2013) was a general (shangjiang) of the People's Liberation Army (PLA). He was an alternate member of the 13th Central Committee of the Chinese Communist Party and a member of the 14th Central Committee of the Chinese Communist Party. He was a member of the Standing Committee of the 9th Chinese People's Political Consultative Conference.

== Biography ==
Gu was born Gu Jianye (顾建业) in Gai County (now Gaizhou), Liaoning, in October 1930.

He enlisted in the People's Liberation Army (PLA) in August 1947, and joined the Chinese Communist Party (CCP) in December 1948. During the Chinese Civil War, he served in the Northeast Field Army. In 1950, he participated in the Korean War. In 1958, he entered PLA Military Academy, where he graduated in 1961. In 1975, he was assigned to the Guangzhou Military Region and appointed head of training department of military schools. He became leader of the 9th Group of Tanzanian Military Experts in the following year. In 1979, he won fame for his heroic efforts at the Sino-Vietnamese War. In June 1985, he was promoted to become deputy commander of the Jinan Military Region, a position he held until April 1990, when he was promoted again to become commander of the Nanjing Military Region.

On 10 September 2013, he died from an illness in Nanjing, Jiangsu, at the age of 82.

He was promoted to the rank of lieutenant general (zhongjiang) in 1988 and general (shangjiang) in 1994.

Military offices
Preceded by Xiang Shouzhi	Commander of the Nanjing Military Region; 1990–1996	Succeeded by Chen Bingde
