= Zhao Nanqi =

Korean Chinese general (1927–2018)

- 赵南起

Director of the PLA General Logistics Department
- In office 1987–1992
- Preceded by: Hong Xuezhi
- Succeeded by: Fu Quanyou

President of the PLA Academy of Military Science
- In office 1992–1995
- Preceded by: Jiang Shunxue
- Succeeded by: Xu Huizi

Personal details
- Born: 20 April 1927 Cheongwon County, Korea, Empire of Japan
- Died: 17 June 2018 (aged 91) Beijing, China
- Party: Chinese Communist Party
- Spouse: Lin Chunshu

Military service
- Allegiance: China
- Branch/service: People's Liberation Army
- Years of service: 1945–1995
- Rank: General
- Battles/wars: Korean War

Chinese name
- Simplified Chinese: 赵南起
- Traditional Chinese: 趙南起
Transcriptions
Standard Mandarin
- Hanyu Pinyin: Zhào Nánqǐ
- Wade–Giles: Chao Nan-ch’i
- IPA: [ʈʂâʊ nǎntɕʰì]

Chinese Korean name
- Chosŏn'gŭl: 조남기
Transcriptions
- Revised Romanization: Jo Namgi
- McCune–Reischauer: Cho Namgi

Zhao Nanqi (Chinese: 赵南起; 20 April 1927 – 17 June 2018), or Cho Nam-gi (Korean: 조남기), was a General of the People's Republic of China and Vice Chairman of the Chinese People's Political Consultative Conference from 1998 to 2003, and Vice-chairman of the 5th National People's Congress.

Born in Japanese-ruled Korea, he moved to Jilin, China as a child. He distinguished himself as a logistics officer of the People's Volunteer Army during the Korean War. After the war, he served in the People's Liberation Army (PLA) Jilin Military District and as Vice Governor of Jilin province. He later served in top leadership positions in the PLA as Director of the General Logistics Department (1987–1992), member of the Central Military Commission, and President of the PLA Academy of Military Science (1992–1995). He attained the top military rank of General in 1988. From 1998 to 2003, he served as a Vice Chairperson of the Chinese People's Political Consultative Conference.

== Early life ==
Cho Nam-gi (Zhao Nanqi in Mandarin Chinese) was born on 20 April 1927 in Cheongwon County in Korea under Japanese rule (in present-day Cheongju, North Chungcheong Province, South Korea). Due to Japanese colonial policies that required Koreans to use Japanese-style names, he also adopted the Japanese surname Toyoda (豊田).

In 1939, Zhao's family moved to Manchukuo, the Japanese-controlled puppet state in Northeast China, and settled in Yongji County, Jilin Province. When Japan surrendered in 1945 at the end of World War II, Chinese rule was restored in Northeast China and Korea regained its independence. Many Koreans in China returned to Korea, but Zhao's family stayed and was recognized as Chaoxianzu (Chinese of Korean ethnicity). Zhao met General Zhou Baozhong of the Northeast Anti-Japanese United Army, who recruited him into the army and sent him to study at Northeast Military and Political University, where he learned to speak, read and write Chinese. He participated in the land reform movement in Jilin and joined the Chinese Communist Party in February 1947.

== Korean War ==
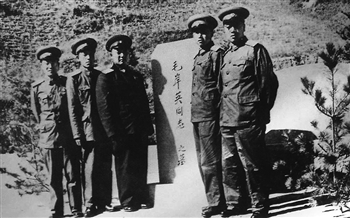
Zhao Nanqi (third from left) at the tomb of Mao Anying, 1958

When China resolved to intervene in the Korean War in October 1950, Zhao was deployed to Korea because of his proficiency in the Korean language. He served in the logistics department of the Chinese People's Volunteer Army (PVA) alongside Mao Anying, the son of Chairman Mao Zedong. Zhao evacuated the cave where the PVA headquarters were located just before American planes bombed it and killed Mao Anying in November 1950.

Zhao distinguished himself during the celebrated Battle of Triangle Hill in October 1952, when the unit under his command braved American aerial bombing and transported 30,000 grenades from Andong, China to the 15th Corps in the front line within 15 hours. He was also responsible for constructing the building in which the Korean Armistice Agreement was signed in 1953.

After the armistice, Zhao was sent to study at the PLA Logistics Academy. Because of his wartime experience, he was promoted to become a lecturer at the academy after only one year of study, and was asked to write a report of his experience and lessons learned during the war. In 1957, he was appointed the director of the PVA office overseeing the withdrawal of the Chinese forces from Korea. He left North Korea together with the last PVA troops in 1958. After returning to China, he was received by Mao Zedong and Marshal Zhu De.

== Later career ==
After the Korean War, Zhao served in the Yanbian Military Subdistrict as a political officer and attained the rank of colonel in 1965. He was persecuted during the early Cultural Revolution, but was rehabilitated and appointed Political Commissar of the Tonghua Military Subdistrict in 1973. He was later promoted to Deputy Political Commissar and then Commissar of the Jilin Military District.

In the 1980s, Zhao was the only Chinese military leader who concurrently served in important provincial civilian positions. He became Vice Governor of Jilin Province in April 1980 and was appointed Chinese Communist Party Deputy Committee Secretary of Jilin in October 1981, serving until 1985.

In March 1985, Zhao was promoted to Deputy Director of the People's Liberation Army General Logistics Department (GLD). He was promoted again to Director of the GLD in 1987 and was appointed a member of the Central Military Commission in April 1988. When the People's Liberation Army restored military ranks (which had been abolished in 1965) in September 1988, Zhao was among the 17 PLA officers to attain the rank of full general (shang jiang), and the only one from an ethnic minority. From 1992 to 1995, he served as President of the PLA Academy of Military Science. In July 1995, Zhao officially retired from the People's Liberation Army, marking the end of his 50-year-long military career.

From 1998 to 2003, Zhao served as vice-chairman of the 9th Chinese People's Political Consultative Conference (CPPCC) National Committee. He paid an official visit to North Korea in June 1998 and paid his respects to the grave of Mao Anying. In April 2000, he paid an official visit to South Korea; it was the first time he returned to his place of birth since he left at the age of 12.

Zhao was a member of the 12th, 13th, and 14th Central Committees of the Chinese Communist Party. He also served as vice-chairman of the Nationalities Committee of the 5th National People's Congress.

== Personal life ==
Zhao was married to Lin Chunshu (林春淑), a fellow Korean War veteran.

== Death ==
Zhao Nanqi died in Beijing on 17 June 2018, at the age of 91.
