= Wang Chengbin (general, born 1928) =

Chinese military personnel (born 1928)

- 王成斌

Commander of the Beijing Military Region
- In office April 1990 – December 1993
- Preceded by: Zhou Yibing
- Succeeded by: Li Laizhu

Personal details
- Born: 15 January 1928 (age 98) Ye County, Shandong, China
- Party: Chinese Communist Party
- Education: PLA Military Academy

Military service
- Allegiance: People's Republic of China
- Branch/service: People's Liberation Army Ground Force
- Years of service: 1944–1993
- Rank: Lieutenant general
- Battles/wars: Second Sino-Japanese War; Chinese Civil War

Wang Chengbin (Chinese: 王成斌; pinyin: Wáng Chéngbīn; born 15 January 1928) is a lieutenant general (zhongjiang) of the People's Liberation Army (PLA). He was a member of the 13th and 14th Central Committee of the Chinese Communist Party.

== Biography ==
Wang was born in Ye County (now Laizhou), Shandong, on 15 January 1928.

He enlisted in the Eighth Route Army in August 1944, and joined the Chinese Communist Party (CCP) in October 1945. During the Second Sino-Japanese War, he resisted the Imperial Japanese Army in Jiaodong Military District. During the Chinese Civil War, he belonged to the 38th Division of the 13th Column of the East China Field Army and engaged in the Jinan campaign, Huaihai campaign, Yangtze River Crossing campaign, Shanghai Campaign, and Fuzhou campaign.

After the establishment of the Communist State in 1951, he served in the 31st Group Army, where he eventually rose to become deputy commander in 1970. He was president of Nanchang Army School in 1983, and held that office until 1985. In June 1985, he was appointed deputy commander of the Nanjing Military Region, he remained in that position until April 1990, when he was transferred to the Beijing Military Region and promoted to commander. He attained the rank of lieutenant general (zhongjiang) in 1988.

== Personal life ==
His daughter Wang Qiuyang (王秋杨; born 1967) is a mountaineer and businesswoman, and his son-in-law Zhang Baoquan (张宝全; born 1957) is a businessman and real estate tycoon.

Military offices
Preceded by Zhou Yibing	Commander of the Beijing Military Region; 1990–1993	Succeeded by Li Laizhu
