= Wang Ke (general) =

Chinese PLA officer (born 1931)

- 王克

Head of the People's Liberation Army General Logistics Department
- In office September 1995 – November 2002
- Preceded by: Fu Quanyou
- Succeeded by: Liao Xilong

Commander of the Shenyang Military Region
- In office 1992–1995
- Preceded by: Liu Jingsong
- Succeeded by: Li Xinliang

Commander of the Lanzhou Military Region
- In office 1986–1992
- Preceded by: Fu Quanyou
- Succeeded by: Liu Jingsong

Personal details
- Born: August 1931 (age 95) Xiao County, Jiangsu, China
- Party: Chinese Communist Party
- Education: Shenyang Advanced Artillery School; PLA Military Academy; Central Party School of the Chinese Communist Party

Military service
- Allegiance: China
- Branch/service: People's Liberation Army Ground Force
- Years of service: 1944–2002
- Rank: General
- Battles/wars: Second Sino-Japanese War; Chinese Civil War; Korean War

Wang Ke (Chinese: 王克; pinyin: Wáng Kè; born August 1931) is a general (shangjiang) of the People's Liberation Army (PLA). He was a member of the 14th and 15th Central Committee of the Chinese Communist Party. He was a delegate to the 9th National People's Congress.

== Biography ==
Wang was born in Xiao County (now belongs to Anhui), Jiangsu, in August 1931. He enlisted in the New Fourth Army in 1944 and took part in the Second Sino-Japanese War. During the Chinese Civil War, he served in the 21st Army. In 1952, he commissioned as battalion commander of artillery regiment of the 21st Army, participating in the Korean War. After graduating from Shenyang Advanced Artillery School, he taught at military schools.

In 1986, he was appointed commander of the Lanzhou Military Region, he remained in that position until 1992, when he was transferred to Shenyang Military Region and appointed commander. He was made head of the People's Liberation Army General Logistics Department in September 1995, and served until his retirement in November 2002.

He was promoted to the rank of lieutenant general (zhongjiang) in 1988 and general (shangjiang) in 1994.

Military offices
Preceded by Xu Zhizhong	Commander of the 21st Group Army; 1983–1986	Succeeded by Pei Huailiang
Preceded by Fu Quanyou	Commander of the Lanzhou Military Region; 1986–1992	Succeeded by Liu Jingsong
Preceded by Liu Jingsong	Commander of the Shenyang Military Region; 1992–1995	Succeeded by Li Xinliang
Preceded by Fu Quanyou	Head of the People's Liberation Army General Logistics Department; 1995–2002	Succeeded by Liao Xilong
