= Liu Jingsong =

- 刘精松

President of the PLA Academy of Military Science
- In office November 1997 – December 1998
- Preceded by: Xu Huizi
- Succeeded by: Wang Zuxun

Commander of the Lanzhou Military Region
- In office November 1992 – November 1997
- Preceded by: Wang Ke
- Succeeded by: Guo Boxiong

Commander of the Shenyang Military Region
- In office 1985–1992
- Preceded by: Li Desheng
- Succeeded by: Wang Ke

Personal details
- Born: July 1933 (age 93) Shishou County, Hubei, China
- Party: Chinese Communist Party
- Education: PLA 7th Infantry School

Military service
- Allegiance: People's Republic of China
- Branch/service: People's Liberation Army Ground Force
- Years of service: 1951–1998
- Rank: General
- Battles/wars: Vietnam War

Chinese name
- Simplified Chinese: 刘精松
- Traditional Chinese: 劉精松
Transcriptions
Standard Mandarin
- Hanyu Pinyin: Liú Jīngsōng

Liu Jingsong (Chinese: 刘精松; born July 1933) is a general (shangjiang) of the People's Liberation Army (PLA). He was a member of the 12th, 13th, 14th and 15th Central Committee of the Chinese Communist Party.

== Biography ==
Liu was born in the town of Gaojimiao, in Shishou County (now Shishou), Hubei, in July 1933. He secondary studied at Shishou High School. He enlisted in the People's Liberation Army (PLA) in July 1951, and joined the Chinese Communist Party (CCP) in 1954. He graduated from the PLA 7th Infantry School. As a result of his performance at the Vietnam War, he was eventually promoted to commander of a PLA army in 1983. In the war, he shot down and injured 12 American fighter planes.

In 1985, he was appointed commander of the Shenyang Military Region, he remained in that position until November 1992, when he was transferred to Lanzhou Military Region and appointed commander. He became president of the PLA Academy of Military Science in November 1997, and served until his retirement in December 1998. During his tenure in 1987, he commanded the troops to put out the forest fire in Daxinganling.

He was promoted to the rank of lieutenant general (zhongjiang) in 1988 and general (shangjiang) in 1994.

== Publication ==
- 新时期军事实践与思考 [Military Practice and Thinking in the New Era] (in Chinese). Beijing: Military Science Press. 2003. ISBN 9787801376343.

Military offices
Preceded by Li Desheng	Commander of the Shenyang Military Region; 1985–1992	Succeeded by Wang Ke
Preceded by Wang Ke	Commander of the Lanzhou Military Region; 1992–1997	Succeeded by Guo Boxiong
Educational offices
Preceded by Xu Huizi	President of the PLA Academy of Military Science; 1997–1998	Succeeded by Wang Zuxun
