= 14th National Congress of the Chinese Communist Party =

1992 Chinese Communist Party conference

14th National Congress of the Chinese Communist Party 中国共产党第十四次全国代表大会
- The flag of the Chinese Communist Party before 1996
- Begins: October 12, 1992
- Ends: October 18, 1992
- Locations: Great Hall of the People, Beijing, China
- Previous event: 13th National Congress of the Chinese Communist Party (1987)
- Next event: 15th National Congress of the Chinese Communist Party (1997)
- Participants: 2,000 delegates
- Major events: Election of the 14th Central Committee and 14th Central Commission for Discipline Inspection
- Leader: Jiang Zemin (Leader of the Chinese Communist Party)

14th National Congress of the Chinese Communist Party
- Simplified Chinese: 中国共产党第十四次全国代表大会
- Traditional Chinese: 中國共產黨第十四次全國代表大會
Transcriptions
Standard Mandarin
- Hanyu Pinyin: Zhōngguó Gòngchǎndǎng dì Shísì cì Quánguó Dàibiǎo Dàhuì

Abbreviated name
- Chinese: 十四大
Transcriptions
Standard Mandarin
- Hanyu Pinyin: Shísì dà

The 14th National Congress of the Chinese Communist Party was convened from 12 to 18 October 1992. It was preceded by the 13th National Congress of the Chinese Communist Party. 2,000 delegates represented the party's 51 million members.

The Congress elected the 14th Central Committee of the Chinese Communist Party. Building socialism with Chinese Characteristics was advanced. The congress outlined the major tasks in the reform, economic and social development in the 1990s. It declared that the target of China's economic restructuring was to establish a socialist market economic system. It was succeeded by the 15th National Congress of the Chinese Communist Party.
