= Yangtze River Crossing campaign =

Military campaign in the Chinese Civil War

- Part of the Chinese Civil War
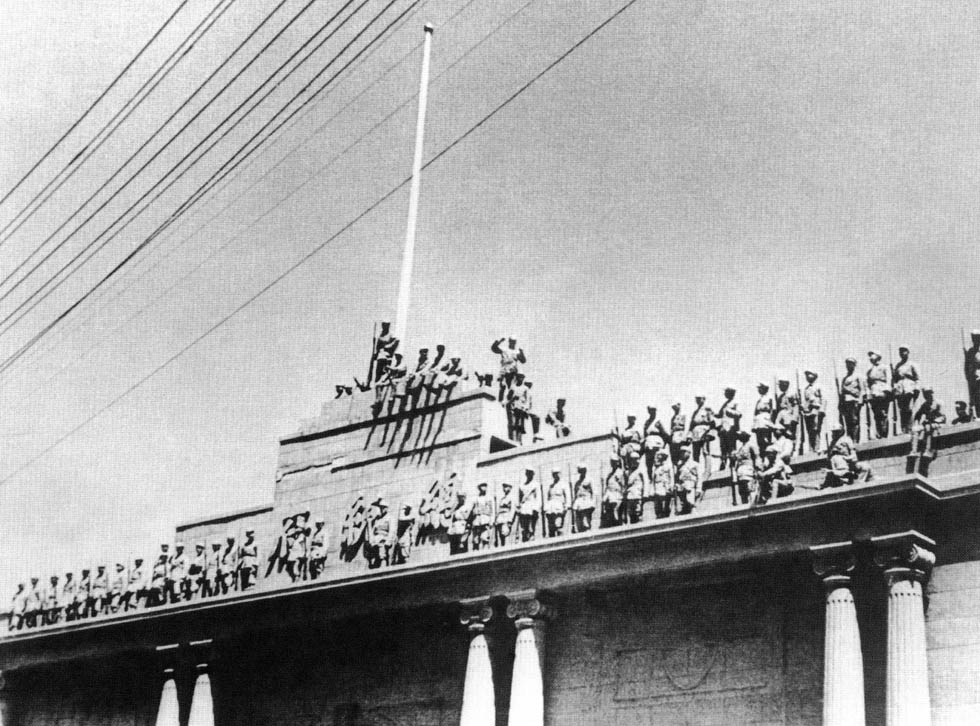
- The People's Liberation Army on top of the Presidential Palace after the fall of Nanjing in April 1949
Date	20 April – 2 June 1949
Location	South of the Yangtze, China
Result	Decisive Chinese Communist Party victory
Territorial changes	Nanjing, Shanghai, and other areas along the Yangtze fall to Communist forces

Belligerents
(Republic of China (1912–1949)) Republic of China: Republic of China Army	Chinese Communist Party: People's Liberation Army

Commanders and leaders
Tang Enbo; Bai Chongxi	Liu Bocheng; Deng Xiaoping; Chen Yi

Strength
700,000	1,000,000

Casualties and losses
430,000	60,000

The Yangtze River Crossing campaign (Chinese: 渡江战役) was a military campaign launched by the People's Liberation Army to cross the Yangtze River and capture Nanjing, the capital of the Nationalist government of the Kuomintang, in the final stage of the Chinese Civil War. The campaign began at night on 20 April, and lasted until 2 June 1949, concluding after the fall of Nanjing and Shanghai to the Communist forces, which eventually resulted in the exile of the Nationalists to the island of Taiwan.

== Background ==
Between the end of 1948 and the beginning of 1949, the Nationalist government suffered consecutive decisive defeats against the Chinese Communist Party (CCP) in the Liaoshen campaign, the Huaihai campaign and the Pingjin campaign. On 21 January 1949, Chiang Kai-shek stepped down as the President of the Republic of China and was replaced by Li Zongren. The area north of the Yangtze River was firmly in control by the Communists by spring of 1949. In the second plenary session of the 7th Congress, the Communist forces were renamed as the People's Liberation Army (PLA) as part of the reorganization efforts in preparation for the campaigns in south China.

== Prelude ==
In April 1949, representatives from both sides met in Beijing and attempted to negotiate a ceasefire. While the negotiations were ongoing, the Communists were actively making military maneuvers, moving Second, Third and Fourth Field Army to the north of the Yangtze in preparation for the campaign, pressuring the Nationalist government to make more concessions. The Nationalist defenses along the Yangtze were led by Tang Enbo and 450,000 men, responsible for Jiangsu, Zhejiang and Jiangxi, while Bai Chongxi was in charge of 250,000 men, defending the portion of the Yangtze stretching from Hukou to Yichang.

The Communist delegation eventually delivered an ultimatum to the Nationalist government. After the Nationalist delegation was instructed to reject the ceasefire agreement on 20 April, the PLA began gradually crossing the Yangtze River on the same night, launching a full assault against Nationalist positions across from the river.

== The campaign ==
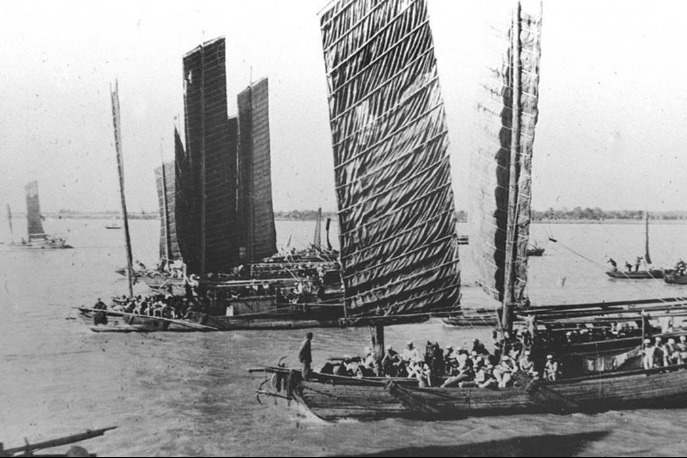
PLA forces using traditional wooden junks during the Yangtze River Crossing Campaign, 1949.

Between 20 April and 21 April, 300,000 men from the PLA crossed from the north to the south banks of the Yangtze River. Both the Second Fleet of the Republic of China Navy and the Nationalist fortress in Jiangyin soon switched sides to the Communists, allowing the PLA to penetrate through Nationalist defenses along the Yangtze. As the PLA began landing on the south side of the Yangtze on 22 April and securing the beachheads, the Nationalist defense lines began to rapidly disintegrate. As Nanjing was now directly threatened, Chiang ordered a scorched earth policy as the Nationalist forces retreated toward Hangzhou and Shanghai. The PLA stormed across Jiangsu province, capturing Danyang, Changzhou and Wuxi in the process. As the Nationalist forces continued to retreat, the PLA was able to capture Nanjing by 23 April without encountering much resistance.

=== Amethyst Incident ===
Meanwhile, HMS Amethyst of the British Royal Navy drifted into the fray and was set upon by PLA artillery. She was soon supported by HMSs London, Consort and Black Swan. After a series of artillery duels and negotiations, Amethyst managed to escape.

=== Further advance ===
On 27 April, the PLA captured Suzhou, threatening Shanghai. In the meanwhile, the Communist forces in the west began attacking Nationalist positions in Nanchang and Wuhan. By the end of May, Nanchang, Wuchang, Hanyang were all under the control of the Communists. The PLA continued to advance across Zhejiang province, and launched the Shanghai Campaign on 12 May. The city center of Shanghai fell to the Communists on 27 May, and the rest of Zhejiang fell on 2 June, marking the end of the Yangtze River Crossing Campaign.

== In popular culture ==
A special badge-shaped copper medal was awarded for crossing the Yangtze River, and Joseph Stalin and the city of Stalingrad were among those who received it.

After the successful conclusion of the campaign, Chairman Mao wrote a poem that has since been set to music and remains popular throughout mainland China.

鍾山風雨起蒼黃，
百萬雄師過大江。
虎踞龍盤今勝昔，
天翻地覆慨而慷。
宜將剩勇追窮寇，
不可沽名學霸王。
天若有情天亦老，
人間正道是滄桑。

Wind howls and rain falls upon the Bell Hills in twilight,
A million gallant warriors shall cross the river tonight.
Like a Tiger Crouched and a Dragon Coiled we outshine our glorious past!
As Heaven Turns and the Earth Churns, the World upside-down at last!
Hark! We cross, we chase our foe who flee to our advance,
We shall not be the crowned monkey, not a single chance.
If the Heavens above had Heart and Soul then Heaven itself shall age!
In the Azure Seas and the Mulberry Fields, Mankind has turned a page.

In 1954, Tang Xiaodan directed the film Reconnaissance Across the Yangtze (渡江侦察记) starring Sun Daolin. Based on the exploits of the PLA officer Xiong Zhaoren and his unit, it glorifies the Communists' victory in the campaign. A major hit in China, it won the Ministry of Culture's Best Film Award in 1957 and was remade in colour during the Cultural Revolution.

== See also ==
- Outline of the Chinese Civil War
- Retreat of the government of the Republic of China to Taiwan
- Fight for Nanjing, Shanghai and Hangzhou, 1990 historical film based on the Yangtze River Crossing campaign
