= Shenyang Military Region =

Former military region of the People's Republic of China

- Shenyang Military Region (highlighted)
- Simplified Chinese: 沈阳军区
- Traditional Chinese: 瀋陽軍區
Transcriptions
Standard Mandarin
- Hanyu Pinyin: Shěnyáng Jūnqū

The Shenyang Military Region was one of seven military regions for the Chinese People's Liberation Army. It has command and control of military and armed police forces in the three northeast provinces of Jilin, Heilongjiang, and Liaoning, which also form Military Districts. This region is now superseded by the Northern Theater Command.

The Shenyang Military Region was left with unchanged boundaries since the late 1960s. It is bordered internally by the Beijing Military Region to the west. Externally, it is bordered by North Korea to the south east and the Russian Far East to the north.

Prior to the Cultural Revolution, military region commanders tended to remain in post for long periods. As the PLA took a stronger role in politics, this began to be seen as something of a threat to party (or, at least, civilian) control of the military. Two commanders served for long periods in the Shenyang MR, Chen Xilian, from 1959 to 1973, and Li Desheng from 1974 to 1985.

As of 15 March 1967, the Central Intelligence Agency identified eight armies in the Shenyang MR. The CIA identified the 16th Army, 23rd Army, the 38th, 39th Army, 40th Army, 46th, 50th, and 64th Armies. However the 38th Army is now assigned to the Beijing Military Region.

The Shenyang Region adjoins the Russian Far East Military District, which numbered some 76,000 personnel in 2007, and is now the Eastern Military District. However, there is a military limitation treaty and information disclosure agreement in place between the Russian Federation and the People's Republic of China.

== Air and ground forces ==
The International Institute for Strategic Studies listed the formation in 2006 with an estimated 250,000 personnel, three group armies, and two armoured, one mechanised, four motorised, and one artillery division. It also lists two armoured, five motorised, three artillery, four anti-aircraft and one anti-tank brigades as part of the region.

Known formations and units in 2006 included the 16th Group Army, headquartered at Changchun, with a motorised infantry division, motorised infantry brigade, the 4th Armoured Division (Meihekou, Jilin) and artillery and anti-aircraft brigades, and the 39th Group Army in Liaoning, and the 40th Group Army headquartered at Jinzhou, Liaoning. The 23rd Group Army was disbanded during the reductions which began in 2003. In Korea in the 1950s, the 23rd Army had included the 67th, 69th, and 73rd Divisions.

Two units directly subordinate to the MR headquarters were the 68th Motorized Infantry Brigade, Qiqihar, Heilongjiang (from 23rd Group Army), and the 69th Motorized Infantry Division, Harbin, Heilongjiang (from 23rd Group Army).

The Shenyang Military Region Air Force was created in 1955, and the Shenyang MR Air Defence Force was merged into it in 1957. The 1st Air Corps and the Dalian Base (formerly the 3rd Air Corps) were both active within the region in 2001–02. The IISS Military Balance 2011 listed the 1st Fighter, 11th, 21st Fighter, and 30th Fighter Divisions active in the region as of November 2010 (p. 234). Scramble.nl writes that 30 September 1992 22nd Division merged with 11th Division, and in 1998 39th Fighter Division was merged into 21st Fighter Division.

== List of commanders ==
- Deng Hua
- Chen Xilian
- Li Desheng
- Liu Jingsong
- Wang Ke
- Li Xinliang
- Liang Guanglie, 1997−99
- Qian Guoliang, 1999−2004
- Chang Wanquan, 2004−07
- Zhang Youxia, 2007−12
- Wang Jiaocheng, 2012−2016 (when the Shenyang Military Region was disestablished and absorbed into the Northern Theater Command)

== Nickname ==
Organizations affiliated with the Shenyang Military Region often used the nickname "forward" (Chinese: 前进; pinyin: qiánjìn; lit. 'front advance'), including the Forward Performance Troupe (Chinese: 前进文工团) and the Forward Newspaper (Chinese: 前进报).
