= Alternates of the 12th Central Committee of the Chinese Communist Party =

The 12th Central Committee of the Chinese Communist Party was elected by the 12th National Congress in 1982, with 172 individuals serving as alternates during this term.

== Alternates ==
Alternates of the 12th Central Committee of the Chinese Communist Party
Name		11th CC	13th CC	Birth	PM	Death	Birthplace	Ethnicity	Gender	Ref.
Ai Zhisheng (Note: Ai Zhisheng was elected as an alternate at the 1985 National Conference, held on 18–23 September 1985.)	艾知生	Nonmember	Member	1928	1948	1997	Hubei	Han	Male	
An Zhiwen	安志文	Nonmember	Nonmember	1919	1937	2017	Shaanxi	Han	Male	
Batu Bagen	巴图巴根	Nonmember	Alternate	1924	1946	2012	Jilin	Mongolian	Male	
Chen Mingyi (Note: Chen Mingyi was elected as an alternate at the 1985 National Conference, held on 18–23 September 1985.)	陈明义	Nonmember	Alternate	1940	1960	Alive	Fujian	Han	Male	
Chen Suzhi	陈素芝	Nonmember	Alternate	1931	1949	2021	Liaoning	Manchu	Female	
Chen Ying	陈煐	Nonmember	Nonmember	1919	1938	2004	Shandong	Han	Male	
Chen Zuolin	陈作霖	Alternate	Nonmember	1923	1941	2015	Anhui	Han	Male	
Danzeng (Note: Danzeng was elected as an alternate at the 1985 National Conference, held on 18–23 September 1985.)	丹增	Nonmember	Alternate	1946	1965	Alive	Tibet	Tibetan	Male	
Ding Fengying	丁凤英	Nonmember	Nonmember	1943	1961	Alive	Hubei	Han	Female	
Ding Henggao (Note: Ding Henggao was elected as an alternate at the 1985 National Conference, held on 18–23 September 1985.)	丁衡高	Nonmember	Member	1931	1953	Alive	Jiangsu	Han	Male	
Ding Tingmo (Note: Ding Tingmo was elected as an alternate at the 1985 National Conference, held on 18–23 September 1985.)	丁廷模	Nonmember	Alternate	1936	1956	Alive	Guizhou	Han	Male	
Dong Jichang	董继昌	Nonmember	Member	1930	1949	2012	Shaanxi	Han	Male	
Dong Zhanlin	董占林	Nonmember	Alternate	1923	1944	Alive	Beijing	Han	Male	
Fang Weizhong	房维中	Nonmember	Member	1928	1950	2025	Liaoning	Han	Male	
Gao Dezhan	高德占	Nonmember	Alternate	1932	1950	2026	Shandong	Han	Male	
Gao Houliang (Note: Gao Houliang left the 12th Central Committee at the 1985 National Conference, held on 18–23 September 1985.)	高厚良	Alternate	Nonmember	1915	1933	2006	Henan	Han	Male	
Gao Zhanxiang	高占祥	Nonmember	Nonmember	1935	1953	2022	Beijing	Han	Male	
Gesang Dorje	格桑多杰	Nonmember	Alternate	1936	1955	Alive	Qinghai	Tibetan	Male	
Gong Benyan	宫本言	Nonmember	Nonmember	1927	1944	2011	Shandong	Han	Male	
Han Ruijie	韩瑞阶	Nonmember	Nonmember	1937	1962	Alive	Tianjin	Han	Male	
Han Xu	韩叙	Nonmember	Alternate	1924	1945	1994	Jiangsu	Han	Male	
He Guangyuan	何光远	Nonmember	Alternate	1930	1945	Alive	Hebei	Han	Male	
He Guoqiang (Note: He Guoqiang was elected as an alternate at the 1985 National Conference, held on 18–23 September 1985.)	贺国强	Nonmember	Alternate	1943	1966	Alive	Hunan	Han	Male	
He Zhukang (Note: He Zhukang was elected as a member at the 1985 National Conference, held on 18–23 September 1985.)	何竹康	Nonmember	Member	1932	1947	2025	Jiangsu	Han	Male	
Hei Boli	黑伯理	Nonmember	Nonmember	1918	1937	2015	Shandong	Hui	Male	
Hu Jintao (Note: Hu Jintao was elected as a member at the 1985 National Conference, held on 18–23 September 1985.)	胡锦涛	Nonmember	Member	1942	1964	Alive	Jiangsu	Han	Male	
Hu Ping (Note: Hu Ping was elected as a member at the 1985 National Conference, held on 18–23 September 1985.)	胡平	Nonmember	Member	1930	1950	2020	Zhejiang	Han	Male	
Huang Demao	黄德懋	Nonmember	Nonmember	1919	1938	2013	Shandong	Han	Male	
Huang Ganying	黄甘英	Nonmember	Nonmember	1921	1937	2023	Guangdong	Han	Female	
Huang Shu	黄枢	Nonmember	Nonmember	1920	1949	Alive	Guangdong	Han	Male	
Janabil	贾那布尔	Alternate	Alternate	1934	1953	2024	Xinjiang	Kazakh	Male	
Jiang Hongquan (Note: Jiang Hongquan was elected as an alternate at the 1985 National Conference, held on 18–23 September 1985.)	姜洪泉	Nonmember	Member	1932	1947	Alive	Shandong	Han	Male	
Jiang Minkuan (Note: Jiang Minkuan was elected as a member at the 1985 National Conference, held on 18–23 September 1985.)	蒋民宽	Nonmember	Member	1930	1961	2012	Jiangsu	Han	Male	
Jiang Xiesheng	姜燮生	Nonmember	Alternate	1928	1952	2015	Jiangsu	Han	Male	
Jiang Xinxiong (Note: Jiang Xinxiong was elected as a member at the 1985 National Conference, held on 18–23 September 1985.)	蒋心雄	Nonmember	Member	1931	1956	Alive	Zhejiang	Han	Male	
Jin Baosheng	金宝生	Nonmember	Nonmember	1927	1953	Alive	Guangxi	Yao	Male	
Jin Jian (Note: Jin Jian was elected as an alternate at the 1985 National Conference, held on 18–23 September 1985.)	金鉴	Nonmember	Alternate	1932	1948	Alive	Beijing	Manchu	Male	
Keyum Bawudong (Note: Keyum Bawudong was elected as an alternate at the 1985 National Conference, held on 18–23 September 1985.)	克尤木·巴吾东	Nonmember	Alternate	1939	1962	Alive	Xinjiang	Uyghur	Male	
Lang Dazhong (Note: Lang Dazhong was made a member by a decision of the 2nd Plenary Session of the 12th Central Committee, held on 11–12 October 1983.)	郎大忠	Nonmember	Nonmember	1933	1954	2025	Yunnan	Dai	Male	
Li Bing	李冰	Nonmember	Nonmember	1920	1941	2002	Anhui	Han	Female	
Li Chang'an (Note: Li Chang'an was elected as a member at the 1985 National Conference, held on 18–23 September 1985.)	李昌安	Nonmember	Nonmember	1935	1961	2021	Liaoning	Han	Male	
Li Changchun (Note: Li Changchun was elected as an alternate at the 1985 National Conference, held on 18–23 September 1985.)	李长春	Nonmember	Member	1944	1965	Alive	Liaoning	Han	Male	
Li Dezhu (Note: Li Dezhu was elected as an alternate at the 1985 National Conference, held on 18–23 September 1985.)	李德洙	Nonmember	Member	1943	1965	Alive	Jilin	Korean	Male	
Li Feng	李锋	Nonmember	Nonmember	1921	1938	2012	Hebei	Han	Male	
Li Gang	李刚	Nonmember	Nonmember	1926	1949	2022	Fujian	Han	Male	
Li Huamin (Note: Li Huamin left the 12th Central Committee at the 1985 National Conference, held on 18–23 September 1985.)	李化民	Alternate	Nonmember	1915	1933	2002	Gansu	Han	Male	
Li Huifen	李慧芬	Nonmember	Alternate	1940	1961	Alive	Beijing	Han	Female	
Li Jijun	李际均	Nonmember	Member	1934	1953	2023	Jilin	Han	Male	
Li Ming (Note: Li Ming was elected as a member at the 1985 National Conference, held on 18–23 September 1985.)	黎明	Nonmember	Alternate	1927	1948	2022	Tianjin	Han	Male	
Li Ruishan	李瑞山	Nonmember	Nonmember	1920	1936	1997	Shaanxi	Han	Male	
Li Shoushan	栗寿山	Nonmember	Alternate	1929	1948	2008	Inner Mongolia	Han	Male	
Li Shuzheng	李淑铮	Nonmember	Alternate	1929	1945	2024	Anhui	Han	Female	
Li Tieying (Note: Li Tieying was elected as a member at the 1985 National Conference, held on 18–23 September 1985.)	李铁映	Nonmember	Member	1936	1955	Alive	Hunan	Han	Male	
Liang Chengye	梁成业	Nonmember	Nonmember	1924	1947	Alive	Guangxi	Zhuang	Male	
Liang Dongcai	梁栋材	Nonmember	Member	1932	1961	2026	Guangdong	Han	Male	
Lin Jianqing	林涧青	Nonmember	Nonmember	1922	1938	2008	Fujian	Han	Male	
Lin Yincai	林殷才	Nonmember	Alternate	1930	1955	2012	Zhejiang	Han	Male	
Liu Guiqian	刘贵谦	Nonmember	Nonmember	1934	1956	Alive	Hebei	Han	Male	
Liu Guofan (Note: Liu Guofan was elected as an alternate at the 1985 National Conference, held on 18–23 September 1985.)	刘国范	Nonmember	Alternate	1929	1954	2001	Liaoning	Han	Male	
Liu Guoguang	刘国光	Nonmember	Alternate	1923	1961	Alive	Jiangsu	Han	Male	
Liu Haiqing	刘海清	Nonmember	Nonmember	1921	1936	2007	Sichuan	Han	Male	
Liu Hongru	刘鸿儒	Nonmember	Alternate	1930	1948	2025	Jilin	Han	Male	
Liu Minghui (Note: Liu Minghui left the 12th Central Committee at the 1985 National Conference, held on 18–23 September 1985.)	刘明辉	Alternate	Nonmember	1914	1933	2010	Jiangxi	Han	Male	
Liu Ronghui (Note: Liu Ronghui was elected as an alternate at the 1985 National Conference, held on 18–23 September 1985.)	刘荣惠	Nonmember	Alternate	1938	1962	1999	Tianjin	Han	Male	
Liu Shusheng	刘树生	Nonmember	Nonmember	1926	1946	2014	Hebei	Hui	Male	
Liu Weiming	刘维明	Alternate	Nonmember	1938	1958	Alive	Hunan	Han	Male	
Liu Yi	刘毅	Nonmember	Alternate	1930	1947	Alive	Shandong	Han	Male	
Liu Youfa	刘友法	Nonmember	Nonmember	1922	1941	2007	Jiangsu	Han	Male	
Liu Yujie	刘玉洁	Nonmember	Alternate	1935	1952	Alive	Henan	Han	Female	
Liu Yunshan (Note: Liu Yunshan was elected as an alternate at the 1985 National Conference, held on 18–23 September 1985.)	刘云山	Nonmember	Nonmember	1947	1971	Alive	Shanxi	Han	Male	
Lu Gongxun	卢功勋	Nonmember	Alternate	1933	1950	2023	Shanxi	Han	Male	
Lu Liangshu	卢良恕	Nonmember	Nonmember	1924	1953	2017	Zhejiang	Han	Male	
Lu Maozeng	陆懋曾	Nonmember	Member	1928	1953	2022	Jiangsu	Han	Male	
Lu Yongxiang (Note: Lu Yongxiang was elected as an alternate at the 1985 National Conference, held on 18–23 September 1985.)	路甬祥	Nonmember	Alternate	1942	1974	Alive	Zhejiang	Han	Male	
Luo Gan	罗干	Nonmember	Member	1935	1960	Alive	Shandong	Han	Male	
Luo Shangcai	罗尚才	Nonmember	Alternate	1929	1954	2008	Guizhou	Buyi	Male	
Ma Hong	马洪	Nonmember	Nonmember	1920	1937	2007	Shanxi	Han	Male	
Ma Ming	马明	Alternate	Nonmember	1937	1959	2012	Shanxi	Han	Male	
Ma Sizhong	马思忠	Alternate	Alternate	1931	1947	2010	Ningxia	Hui	Male	
Ma Weihua (Note: Ma Weihua died in office on 24 August 1985.)	马卫华	Nonmember	Nonmember	1919	1938	1985	Hebei	Han	Male	
Ma Zhongchen	马忠臣	Nonmember	Alternate	1936	1956	2021	Shandong	Han	Male	
Nian Dexiang (Note: Nian Dexiang died in office on 5 October 1986.)	年得祥	Nonmember	Nonmember	1930	1950	1986	Gansu	Hui	Male	
Nie Kuiju	聂奎聚	Nonmember	Member	1926	1945	1992	Shandong	Han	Male	
Pan Rongwen	潘荣文	Nonmember	Nonmember	1931	1955	2022	Jiangsu	Han	Female	
Peng Shilu	彭士禄	Nonmember	Nonmember	1925	1945	2021	Guangdong	Han	Male	
Qi Yuanjing (Note: Qi Yuanjing was elected as an alternate at the 1985 National Conference, held on 18–23 September 1985.)	戚元靖	Nonmember	Member	1929	1945	1994	Hubei	Han	Male	
Qian Qichen (Note: Qian Qichen was elected as a member at the 1985 National Conference, held on 18–23 September 1985.)	钱其琛	Nonmember	Member	1928	1942	2017	Shanghai	Han	Male	
Qian Xuesen (Note: Qian Xuesen left the 12th Central Committee at the 1985 National Conference, held on 18–23 September 1985.)	钱学森	Alternate	Nonmember	1911	1958	2009	Zhejiang	Han	Male	
Qiao Xueting	乔学亭	Nonmember	Nonmember	1924	1938	2011	Shandong	Han	Male	
Qiao Zonghuai (Note: Qiao Zonghuai was elected as an alternate at the 1985 National Conference, held on 18–23 September 1985.)	乔宗淮	Nonmember	Alternate	1944	1964	Alive	Jiangsu	Han	Male	
Quan Shuren (Note: Quan Shuren was elected as an alternate at the 1985 National Conference, held on 18–23 September 1985.)	全树仁	Nonmember	Member	1930	1949	2008	Liaoning	Han	Male	
Ren Rong	任荣	Nonmember	Nonmember	1917	1933	2017	Sichuan	Han	Male	
Song Defu (Note: Song Defu was elected as an alternate at the 1985 National Conference, held on 18–23 September 1985.)	宋德福	Nonmember	Member	1946	1965	2007	Hebei	Han	Male	
Song Hanliang (Note: Song Hanliang was elected as an alternate at the 1985 National Conference, held on 18–23 September 1985.)	宋汉良	Nonmember	Member	1934	1960	2000	Zhejiang	Han	Male	
Song Jian (Note: Song Jian was elected as a member at the 1985 National Conference, held on 18–23 September 1985.)	宋健	Nonmember	Member	1931	1947	Alive	Shandong	Han	Male	
Sun Guozhi (Note: Sun Guozhi left the 12th Central Committee at the 1985 National Conference, held on 18–23 September 1985.)	孙国治	Nonmember	Nonmember	1917	1938	2005	Hebei	Han	Male	
Sun Jiazheng (Note: Sun Jiazheng was elected as an alternate at the 1985 National Conference, held on 18–23 September 1985.)	孙家正	Nonmember	Alternate	1944	1966	Alive	Jiangsu	Han	Male	
Sun Tongchuan (Note: Sun Tongchuan was elected as an alternate at the 1985 National Conference, held on 18–23 September 1985.)	孙同川	Nonmember	Alternate	1940	1970	Alive	Henan	Han	Male	
Sun Weiben (Note: Sun Weiben was elected as a member at the 1985 National Conference, held on 18–23 September 1985.)	孙维本	Nonmember	Member	1928	1947	2020	Liaoning	Han	Male	
Sun Wensheng (Note: Sun Wensheng was elected as an alternate at the 1985 National Conference, held on 18–23 September 1985.)	孙文盛	Nonmember	Alternate	1942	1966	Alive	Shandong	Han	Male	
Tang Zhongwen	唐仲文	Nonmember	Nonmember	1930	1952	Alive	Shanghai	Han	Male	
Tian Shixing	田世兴	Nonmember	Nonmember	1921	1939	2016	Shandong	Han	Male	
Wang Dongxing (Note: Wang Dongxing left the 12th Central Committee at the 1985 National Conference, held on 18–23 September 1985.)	汪东兴	Nonmember	Nonmember	1916	1932	2015	Jiangxi	Han	Male	
Wang Fuzhi	王扶之	Alternate	Nonmember	1923	1936	Alive	Shaanxi	Han	Male	
Wang Jialiu	汪家鏐	Nonmember	Nonmember	1929	1946	Alive	Zhejiang	Han	Female	
Wang Jiangong	王建功	Nonmember	Nonmember	1936	1956	1998	Hebei	Han	Male	
Wang Jinshan (Note: Wang Jinshan left the 12th Central Committee at the 1985 National Conference, held on 18–23 September 1985.)	王金山	Alternate	Nonmember	1915	1938	1994	Hebei	Han	Male	
Wang Linhe	王林鹤	Nonmember	Nonmember	1931	1959	1995	Zhejiang	Han	Male	
Wang Liusheng (Note: Wang Liusheng left the 12th Central Committee at the 1985 National Conference, held on 18–23 September 1985.)	王六生	Alternate	Nonmember	1917	1932	1995	Jiangxi	Han	Male	
Wang Meng (Note: Wang Meng was elected as a member at the 1985 National Conference, held on 18–23 September 1985.)	王蒙	Nonmember	Member	1934	1948	Alive	Hebei	Han	Male	
Wang Qian (Note: Wang Qian left the 12th Central Committee at the 1985 National Conference, held on 18–23 September 1985.)	王谦	Nonmember	Nonmember	1917	1936	2007	Shanxi	Han	Male	
Wang Qun	王群	Nonmember	Member	1926	1944	2017	Hubei	Han	Male	
Wang Renzhi (Note: Wang Renzhi was elected as a member at the 1985 National Conference, held on 18–23 September 1985.)	王忍之	Nonmember	Member	1933	1950	2025	Jiangsu	Han	Male	
Wang Xuezhen	王学珍	Nonmember	Alternate	1926	1948	2021	Zhejiang	Han	Male	
Wang Yuefeng	王越丰	Nonmember	Alternate	1930	1951	1999	Hainan	Li	Male	
Wang Yuzhao (Note: Wang Yuzhao was elected as an alternate at the 1985 National Conference, held on 18–23 September 1985.)	王郁昭	Nonmember	Nonmember	1926	1946	2016	Shandong	Han	Male	
Wang Zongchun (Note: Wang Zongchun was elected as an alternate at the 1985 National Conference, held on 18–23 September 1985.)	王宗春	Nonmember	Nonmember	1935	1961	Alive	Shandong	Han	Male	
Wei Jianxing (Note: Wei Jianxing was elected as a member at the 1985 National Conference, held on 18–23 September 1985.)	尉健行	Nonmember	Member	1931	1949	2015	Zhejiang	Han	Male	
Wei Jinshan (Note: Wei Jinshan was elected as a member at the 1985 National Conference, held on 18–23 September 1985.)	魏金山	Nonmember	Member	1927	1945	2023	Shandong	Han	Male	
Wei Mingyi	魏鸣一	Nonmember	Nonmember	1924	1961	Alive	Hubei	Han	Male	
Wu Bangguo (Note: Wu Bangguo was elected as an alternate at the 1985 National Conference, held on 18–23 September 1985.)	吴邦国	Nonmember	Alternate	1941	1964	2024	Anhui	Han	Male	
Wu Guanzheng (Note: Wu Guanzheng was elected as an alternate at the 1985 National Conference, held on 18–23 September 1985.)	吴官正	Nonmember	Member	1938	1962	Alive	Jiangxi	Han	Male	
Wu Lengxi	吴冷西	Alternate	Nonmember	1919	1938	2002	Guangdong	Han	Male	
Wu Weiran (Note: Wu Weiran was elected as a member at the 1985 National Conference, held on 18–23 September 1985.)	吴蔚然	Nonmember	Member	1920	1956	2016	Jiangsu	Han	Male	
Wu Wenying	吴文英	Nonmember	Member	1932	1949	2007	Jiangsu	Han	Female	
Wu Xiangbi	吴向必	Alternate	Nonmember	1926	1952	1997	Guizhou	Miao	Male	
Wu Zuqiang	吴祖强	Nonmember	Nonmember	1926	1952	1997	Guizhou	Han	Male	
Xie Fei	谢非	Nonmember	Member	1932	1949	1999	Guangdong	Han	Male	
Xing Chongzhi (Note: Xing Chongzhi was elected as a member at the 1985 National Conference, held on 18–23 September 1985.)	邢崇智	Nonmember	Member	1927	1943	2000	Hebei	Han	Male	
Xing Zhikang	邢至康	Nonmember	Alternate	1930	1946	2022	Shanghai	Han	Female	
Xiong Qingquan (Note: Xiong Qingquan was elected as a member at the 1985 National Conference, held on 18–23 September 1985.)	熊清泉	Nonmember	Member	1927	1949	2022	Hunan	Han	Male	
Xu Qin	许勤	Nonmember	Nonmember	1928	1949	2021	Liaoning	Han	Male	
Xu Shiqun (Note: Xu Shiqun was elected as an alternate at the 1985 National Conference, held on 18–23 September 1985.)	徐世群	Nonmember	Alternate	1940	1960	Alive	Chongqing	Han	Male	
Xu Xin	徐信	Nonmember	Nonmember	1921	1937	2005	Hebei	Han	Male	
Yan Zheng	严政	Nonmember	Nonmember	1918	1934	2003	Sichuan	Han	Male	
Yang Guoliang (Note: Yang Guoliang was elected as an alternate at the 1985 National Conference, held on 18–23 September 1985.)	杨国梁	Nonmember	Alternate	1938	1961	Alive	Hebei	Han	Male	
Yang Haibo	杨海波	Nonmember	Nonmember	1923	1939	2016	Jiangsu	Han	Male	
Yang Lingduoji	杨岭多吉	Nonmember	Nonmember	1931	1949	Alive	Sichuan	Tibetan	Male	
Yang Taifang (Note: Yang Taifang was made a member by a decision of the 2nd Plenary Session of the 12th Central Committee, held on 11–12 October 1983.)	杨泰芳	Nonmember	Member	1927	1948	2012	Guangdong	Han	Male	
Yang Xizong (Note: Yang Xizong was elected as a member at the 1985 National Conference, held on 18–23 September 1985.)	杨析综	Nonmember	Member	1928	1952	2007	Sichuan	Han	Male	
Yang Yongliang	杨永良	Alternate	Alternate	1944	1970	2012	Anhui	Han	Male	
Yang Zhengwu (Note: Yang Zhengwu was elected as a member at the 1985 National Conference, held on 18–23 September 1985.)	杨正午	Nonmember	Member	1941	1969	Alive	Hunan	Tujia	Male	
Yang Zhong (Note: Yang Zhong was elected as an alternate at the 1985 National Conference, held on 18–23 September 1985.)	杨钟	Nonmember	Nonmember	1932	1952	2012	Sichuan	Han	Male	
Ye Xuanping (Note: Ye Xuanping was elected as a member at the 1985 National Conference, held on 18–23 September 1985.)	叶选平	Nonmember	Member	1924	1945	2019	Guangdong	Han	Male	
Yin Changmin (Note: Yin Changmin was made a member by the 6th Plenary Session of the 12th Central Committee, held on 28 September 1986.)	尹长民	Nonmember	Alternate	1923	1956	2009	Jiangxi	Han	Female	
Yin Jun	尹俊	Nonmember	Alternate	1932	1949	2011	Yunnan	Bai	Male	
Yu Hongli	于鸿礼	Nonmember	Nonmember	1931	1949	Alive	Shandong	Han	Male	
Yu Sang (Note: Yu Sang left the 12th Central Committee at the 1985 National Conference, held on 18–23 September 1985.)	于桑	Nonmember	Nonmember	1917	1936	2008	Sichuan	Han	Male	
Yu Zhenwu	于振武	Nonmember	Alternate	1931	1949	2023	Liaoning	Han	Male	
Yuan Fanglie	袁芳烈	Nonmember	Nonmember	1929	1946	2009	Shandong	Han	Male	
Yuan Jun	袁俊	Nonmember	Alternate	1924	1940	2004	Jiangsu	Han	Male	
Yuan Weimin (Note: Yuan Weimin was elected as an alternate at the 1985 National Conference, held on 18–23 September 1985.)	袁伟民	Nonmember	Member	1939	1962	Alive	Jiangsu	Han	Male	
Zhang Boxiang	张伯祥	Nonmember	Nonmember	1918	1938	2010	Shandong	Han	Male	
Zhang Gensheng	张根生	Nonmember	Nonmember	1923	1938	2008	Hebei	Han	Male	
Zhang Jianmin	张健民	Nonmember	Nonmember	1920	1938	Alive	Hebei	Han	Male	
Zhang Lichang (Note: Zhang Lichang was elected as an alternate at the 1985 National Conference, held on 18–23 September 1985.)	张立昌	Nonmember	Alternate	1939	1966	2008	Hebei	Han	Male	
Zhang Wannian	张万年	Nonmember	Alternate	1928	1945	2015	Shandong	Han	Male	
Zhang Wanxin	张万欣	Nonmember	Alternate	1930	1952	2014	Shandong	Han	Male	
Zhang Xiang	张祥	Nonmember	Nonmember	1919	1930	2019	Hubei	Han	Male	
Zhang Xintai	张辛泰	Nonmember	Nonmember	1937	1956	2005	Hebei	Han	Male	
Zhang Xudeng	张序登	Nonmember	Nonmember	1925	1942	2007	Shandong	Han	Male	
Zhang Zhongxian (Note: Zhang Zhongxian was elected as an alternate at the 1985 National Conference, held on 18–23 September 1985.)	张仲先	Nonmember	Member	1926	1941	2022	Shandong	Han	Male	
Zhao Di (Note: Zhao Di was elected as an alternate at the 1985 National Conference, held on 18–23 September 1985.)	赵地	Nonmember	Alternate	1938	1956	Alive	Shaanxi	Han	Female	
Zhao Dongwan	赵东宛	Nonmember	Member	1925	1941	2020	Henan	Han	Male	
Zhao Zongnai	赵宗鼐	Nonmember	Member	1928	1948	Alive	Beijing	Han	Male	
Zheng Guangdi	郑光迪	Nonmember	Nonmember	1934	1952	Alive	Fujian	Han	Female	
Zheng Hua (Note: Zheng Hua was elected as an alternate at the 1985 National Conference, held on 18–23 September 1985.)	郑华	Nonmember	Alternate	1930	1949	Alive	Guangdong	Han	Male	
Zhou Aqing	周阿庆	Alternate	Nonmember	1923	1956	2001	Zhejiang	Han	Male	
Zhou Guangzhao (Note: Zhou Guangzhao was elected as a member at the 1985 National Conference, held on 18–23 September 1985.)	周光召	Nonmember	Member	1929	1952	2024	Hunan	Han	Male	
Zhu Houze (Note: Zhu Houze was elected as a member at the 1985 National Conference, held on 18–23 September 1985.)	朱厚泽	Nonmember	Nonmember	1931	1949	2010	Guizhou	Han	Male	
Zhu Xun (Note: Zhu Xun was elected as a member at the 1985 National Conference, held on 18–23 September 1985.)	朱训	Nonmember	Member	1930	1946	Alive	Jiangsu	Han	Male	
Zou Jiahua (Note: Zou Jiahua was elected as a member at the 1985 National Conference, held on 18–23 September 1985.)	邹家华	Alternate	Member	1926	1945	2025	Shanghai	Han	Male	
Zou Jingmeng	邹竞蒙	Nonmember	Alternate	1929	1948	1999	Shanghai	Han	Male	
