= Alternates of the 13th Central Committee of the Chinese Communist Party =

The 13th Central Committee of the Chinese Communist Party was elected by the 13th National Congress in 1987, with 110 individuals serving as alternates during this term.

== Alternates ==
Alternates of the 13th Central Committee of the Chinese Communist Party
Ballot	Name		12th CC	14th CC	Birth	PM	Death	Birthplace	Ethnicity	Gender	Ref.
1	Gesang Dorje (Note: Gesang Dorje was advanced from alternate to member of the 13th Central Committee to fill a vacant seat, by a decision of the 4th Plenary Session of the 13th Central Committee, held on 23–24 June 1989.)	格桑多杰	Alternate	Nonmember	1936	1955	Alive	Qinghai	Tibetan	Male	
2	Jia Zhijie (Note: Jia Zhijie was advanced from alternate to member of the 13th Central Committee to fill a vacant seat, by a decision of the 5th Plenary Session of the 13th Central Committee, held on 6–9 November 1989.)	贾志杰	Nonmember	Member	1935	1960	Alive	Jilin	Han	Male	
3	Ma Yuhai (Note: Ma Yuhai was advanced from alternate to member of the 13th Central Committee to fill a vacant seat, by a decision of the 8th Plenary Session of the 13th Central Committee, held on 25–29 November 1991.)	马玉海	Nonmember	Nonmember	1931	1953	Alive	Gansu	Hui	Male	
4	Danzeng (Note: Danzeng was advanced from alternate to member of the 13th Central Committee to fill a vacant seat, by a decision of the 9th Plenary Session of the 13th Central Committee, held on 5–9 October 1992.)	丹增	Alternate	Alternate	1946	1965	Alive	Tibet	Tibetan	Male	
5	Wang Yuefeng (Note: Wang Yuefeng was advanced from alternate to member of the 13th Central Committee to fill a vacant seat, by a decision of the 9th Plenary Session of the 13th Central Committee, held on 5–9 October 1992.)	王越丰	Alternate	Nonmember	1930	1951	1999	Hainan	Li	Male	
6	Keyum Bawudong (Note: Keyum Bawudong was advanced from alternate to member of the 13th Central Committee to fill a vacant seat, by a decision of the 9th Plenary Session of the 13th Central Committee, held on 5–9 October 1992.)	克尤木·巴吾东	Alternate	Alternate	1939	1962	Alive	Xinjiang	Uyghur	Male	
7	Li Zhenqian (Note: Li Zhenqian was advanced from alternate to member of the 13th Central Committee to fill a vacant seat, by a decision of the 9th Plenary Session of the 13th Central Committee, held on 5–9 October 1992.)	李振潜	Nonmember	Nonmember	1937	1955	Alive	Tianjin	Han	Male	
8	Zhang Lianzhong	张连忠	Nonmember	Member	1931	1948	Alive	Shandong	Han	Male	
9	Chen Mingyi	陈明义	Alternate	Alternate	1940	1960	Alive	Fujian	Han	Male	
10	Luo Shangcai	罗尚才	Alternate	Nonmember	1929	1954	2008	Guizhou	Buyi	Male	
11	Janabil	贾那布尔	Alternate	Alternate	1934	1953	2024	Xinjiang	Kazakh	Male	
12	Wang Zhiwu	王志武	Nonmember	Alternate	1932	1956	Alive	Shaanxi	Han	Male	
13	Liu Guoguang	刘国光	Alternate	Nonmember	1923	1961	Alive	Jiangsu	Han	Male	
14	He Daoquan	何道泉	Nonmember	Nonmember	1933	1951	Alive	Hubei	Han	Male	
15	Chen Minzhang	陈敏章	Nonmember	Member	1931	1954	1999	Zhejiang	Han	Male	
16	Jiang Xiesheng	姜燮生	Alternate	Nonmember	1928	1952	2015	Jiangsu	Han	Male	
17	Ma Sizhong	马思忠	Alternate	Nonmember	1931	1947	2010	Ningxia	Hui	Male	
18	Yang Guoliang	杨国梁	Alternate	Member	1938	1961	Alive	Hebei	Han	Male	
19	Zou Jingmeng	邹竞蒙	Alternate	Alternate	1929	1948	1999	Shanghai	Han	Male	
20	Gao Zhenning	高镇宁	Nonmember	Nonmember	1929	1949	1996	Liaoning	Han	Male	
21	Wang Luolin	王洛林	Nonmember	Alternate	1938	1978	Alive	Hubei	Han	Male	
22	Zhang Lichang	张立昌	Alternate	Member	1939	1966	2008	Hebei	Han	Male	
23	Zhao Guochen	赵国臣	Nonmember	Nonmember	1935	1960	1994	Liaoning	Han	Male	
24	Wang Xuezhen	王学珍	Alternate	Nonmember	1926	1948	2021	Zhejiang	Han	Male	
25	Yin Jun	尹俊	Alternate	Nonmember	1932	1949	2011	Yunnan	Bai	Male	
26	Ye Liansong	叶连松	Nonmember	Member	1935	1958	Alive	Shandong	Han	Male	
27	Zhang Wannian	张万年	Alternate	Member	1928	1945	2015	Shandong	Han	Male	
28	Chen Suzhi	陈素芝	Alternate	Nonmember	1931	1949	2021	Liaoning	Manchu	Female	
29	Ge Hongsheng	葛洪升	Nonmember	Member	1931	1948	2020	Shandong	Han	Male	
30	Fu Xishou	傅锡寿	Nonmember	Member	1931	1959	2015	Beijing	Han	Male	
31	Zhu Senlin	朱森林	Nonmember	Member	1930	1952	Alive	Shanghai	Han	Male	
32	Zhou Shaoxun	周绍勋	Nonmember	Nonmember	1934	1955	1998	Tianjin	Han	Male	
33	Liu Fangren	刘方仁	Nonmember	Alternate	1936	1954	Alive	Shaanxi	Han	Male	
34	Yang Yongliang	杨永良	Alternate	Alternate	1944	1970	2012	Anhui	Han	Male	
35	Chen Shijun	陈世俊	Nonmember	Nonmember	1942	1964	Alive	Yunnan	Han	Male	
36	Zheng Hua	郑华	Alternate	Nonmember	1930	1949	Alive	Guangdong	Han	Male	
37	Qian Guoliang	钱国梁	Nonmember	Alternate	1940	1960	2023	Jiangsu	Han	Male	
38	Qian Shaojun	钱绍钧	Nonmember	Nonmember	1934	1956	Alive	Zhejiang	Han	Male	
39	Lu Gongxun	卢功勋	Alternate	Nonmember	1933	1950	2023	Shanxi	Han	Male	
40	Liu Guofan	刘国范	Alternate	Nonmember	1929	1954	2001	Liaoning	Han	Male	
41	Liu Hongru	刘鸿儒	Alternate	Nonmember	1930	1948	2025	Jilin	Han	Male	
42	Zhou Yushu	周玉书	Nonmember	Member	1933	1956	2021	Hunan	Han	Male	
43	He Guoqiang	贺国强	Alternate	Alternate	1943	1966	Alive	Hunan	Han	Male	
44	Liang Guanglie	梁光烈	Nonmember	Alternate	1940	1959	2024	Sichuan	Han	Male	
45	Lu Yongxiang	路甬祥	Alternate	Member	1942	1974	Alive	Zhejiang	Han	Male	
46	Wang Zhongyu	王忠禹	Nonmember	Member	1933	1956	Alive	Jilin	Han	Male	
47	Peng Gongge	彭功阁	Nonmember	Nonmember	1933	1954	Alive	Henan	Han	Male	
48	Zhu Kaixuan	朱开轩	Nonmember	Alternate	1932	1953	2016	Shanghai	Han	Male	
49	He Guangyuan	何光远	Alternate	Member	1930	1945	Alive	Hebei	Han	Male	
50	Sun Tongchuan	孙同川	Alternate	Alternate	1940	1970	Alive	Henan	Han	Male	
51	Song Keda	宋克达	Nonmember	Member	1928	1945	1995	Jiangsu	Han	Male	
52	Zhao Bingyao	赵炳耀	Nonmember	Nonmember	1932	1949	2001	Shandong	Han	Male	
53	Li Shoushan	栗寿山	Alternate	Nonmember	1929	1948	2008	Inner Mongolia	Han	Male	
54	Liu Yujie	刘玉洁	Alternate	Nonmember	1935	1952	Alive	Henan	Han	Female	
55	Sun Jiazheng	孙家正	Alternate	Alternate	1944	1966	Alive	Jiangsu	Han	Male	
56	Li Shuzheng	李淑铮	Alternate	Alternate	1929	1945	2024	Anhui	Han	Female	
57	Lin Yincai	林殷才	Alternate	Nonmember	1930	1955	2012	Zhejiang	Han	Male	
58	Sun Wensheng	孙文盛	Alternate	Alternate	1942	1966	Alive	Shandong	Han	Male	
59	Chen Yujie	陈玉杰	Nonmember	Alternate	1941	1961	Alive	Jilin	Han	Female	
60	Qian Shugen	钱树根	Nonmember	Alternate	1939	1956	Alive	Jiangsu	Han	Male	
61	Zeng Xianlin	曾宪林	Nonmember	Alternate	1929	1947	Alive	Sichuan	Han	Male	
62	Yu Zhenwu	于振武	Alternate	Nonmember	1931	1949	2023	Liaoning	Han	Male	
63	Shi Dazhen	史大桢	Nonmember	Alternate	1932	1978	2024	Jiangsu	Han	Male	
64	Wu Bangguo	吴邦国	Alternate	Member	1941	1964	2024	Anhui	Han	Male	
65	Zhang Siqing	张思卿	Nonmember	Member	1932	1952	2022	Henan	Han	Male	
66	He Zhiqiang	和志强	Nonmember	Member	1934	1956	2007	Yunnan	Naxi	Male	
67	Xu Shiqun	徐世群	Alternate	Nonmember	1940	1960	Alive	Chongqing	Han	Male	
68	Ding Tingmo	丁廷模	Alternate	Nonmember	1936	1956	Alive	Guizhou	Han	Male	
69	Luan Enjie	栾恩杰	Nonmember	Alternate	1940	1966	Alive	Liaoning	Manchu	Male	
70	Sha Jiansun	沙健孙	Nonmember	Alternate	1934	1953	Alive	Jiangsu	Hui	Male	
71	Chen Zhili	陈至立	Nonmember	Alternate	1942	1961	Alive	Fujian	Han	Female	
72	Gu Chuanxun	顾传训	Nonmember	Nonmember	1935	1959	2010	Zhejiang	Han	Male	
73	Zeng Qingcun	曾庆存	Nonmember	Alternate	1935	1956	Alive	Guangdong	Han	Male	
74	Batu Bagen	巴图巴根	Alternate	Nonmember	1924	1946	2012	Jilin	Mongolian	Male	
75	Liao Wenhai	廖文海	Nonmember	Alternate	1934	1953	2009	Sichuan	Han	Female	
76	Liu Yi	刘毅	Alternate	Alternate	1930	1947	Alive	Shandong	Han	Male	
77	Li Huifen	李慧芬	Alternate	Alternate	1940	1961	Alive	Beijing	Han	Female	
78	Han Xu	韩叙	Alternate	Nonmember	1924	1945	1994	Jiangsu	Han	Male	
79	Qi Huaiyuan	齐怀远	Nonmember	Member	1930	1948	2022	Shanghai	Han	Male	
80	Li Lanqing	李岚清	Nonmember	Member	1932	1952	Alive	Jiangsu	Han	Male	
81	Wu Yi	吴仪	Nonmember	Member	1938	1962	Alive	Hubei	Han	Female	
82	Zhang Yanzhong	张彦仲	Nonmember	Alternate	1940	1960	Shaanxi	Shaanxi	Han	Male	
83	Deng Hongxun	邓鸿勋	Nonmember	Member	1931	1947	2019	Jiangsu	Han	Male	
84	Wang Jialiu	汪家镠	Nonmember	Member	1929	1946	Alive	Zhejiang	Han	Female	
85	Gao Dezhan	高德占	Alternate	Member	1932	1950	2026	Shandong	Han	Male	
86	Liu Ronghui	刘荣惠	Alternate	Nonmember	1938	1962	1999	Tianjin	Han	Male	
87	Zhao Yannian	赵延年	Nonmember	Alternate	1929	1950	2019	Henan	Hui	Male	
88	Jin Jian	金鉴	Alternate	Nonmember	1932	1948	Alive	Beijing	Manchu	Male	
89	Zhang Wanxin	张万欣	Alternate	Nonmember	1930	1952	2014	Shandong	Han	Male	
90	Dong Zhanlin	董占林	Alternate	Nonmember	1923	1944	Alive	Beijing	Han	Male	
91	Zhu Rongji	朱镕基	Nonmember	Member	1928	1949	2026	Hunan	Han	Male	
92	Li Senmao	李森茂	Nonmember	Nonmember	1929	1959	1996	Tianjin	Han	Male	
93	Ren Tie	任铁	Nonmember	Nonmember	1943	1973	2007	Hebei	Han	Male	
94	Zong Shunliu	宗顺留	Nonmember	Nonmember	1941	1963	2024	Jiangsu	Han	Male	
95	Sun Qi	孙奇	Nonmember	Nonmember	1930	1949	Alive	Liaoning	Han	Male	
96	Gui Shiyong	桂世镛	Nonmember	Alternate	1935	1956	2003	Zhejiang	Han	Male	
97	Xing Zhikang	邢至康	Alternate	Nonmember	1930	1946	2022	Shanghai	Han	Female	
98	Hu Xiaoyun	胡笑云	Nonmember	Nonmember	1935	1949	2022	Hebei	Han	Male	
99	Gu Hui	固辉	Nonmember	Member	1930	1948	2013	Liaoning	Han	Male	
100	Bai Enpei	白恩培	Nonmember	Alternate	1946	1973	Alive	Shaanxi	Han	Male	
101	Chen Bangzhu	陈邦柱	Nonmember	Member	1938	1956	2026	Jiangxi	Han	Male	
102	Zhou Wenyuan	周文元	Nonmember	Member	1940	1963	Alive	Tianjin	Han	Male	
103	Zhao Di	赵地	Alternate	Nonmember	1938	1956	Alive	Shaanxi	Han	Female	
104	Ma Zhongchen	马忠臣	Alternate	Alternate	1936	1956	2021	Shandong	Han	Male	
105	Qiao Zonghuai	乔宗淮	Alternate	Nonmember	1944	1964	Alive	Jiangsu	Han	Male	
106	Yuan Jun	袁俊	Alternate	Nonmember	1924	1940	2004	Jiangsu	Han	Male	
107	He Qizong	何其宗	Nonmember	Alternate	1943	1965	Alive	Sichuan	Han	Male	
108	Yin Changmin	尹长民	Alternate	Nonmember	1923	1956	2009	Jiangxi	Han	Female	
109	Li Ming	黎明	Alternate	Alternate	1927	1948	2022	Tianjin	Han	Male	
110	Huang Ju	黄菊	Nonmember	Member	1938	1963	2007	Shanghai	Han	Male	
