= Alternates of the 11th Central Committee of the Chinese Communist Party =

The 11th Central Committee of the Chinese Communist Party was elected by the 11th National Congress in 1977, with 132 individuals serving as alternates during this term.

== Alternates ==
Alternates of the 11th Central Committee of the Chinese Communist Party
Name		10th CC	12th CC	Birth	PM	Death	Birthplace	Ethnicity	Gender	Ref.
Bu Guxiang	卜谷香	Alternate	Nonmember	1936	1959	Alive	Hunan	Han	Male	
Cai Fenglan	蔡凤兰	Nonmember	Nonmember	1936	1960	Alive	Liaoning	Han	Female	
Cao Siming	曹思明	Nonmember	Nonmember	1917	1936	2003	Henan	Han	Male	
Cen Guorong	岑国荣	Member	Nonmember	1934	1955	2018	Guangxi	Han	Male	
Chen Ai'e	陈爱娥	Nonmember	Nonmember	1938	1954	Alive	Hubei	Han	Female	
Chen Renfu	陈仁甫	Nonmember	Nonmember	1932	1960	Alive	Zhejiang	Han	Male	
Chen Xianrui	陈先瑞	Member	Nonmember	1913	1931	1996	Anhui	Han	Male	
Chen Yonglin	陈永林	Nonmember	Nonmember	1925	1956	Alive	Shanghai	Han	Male	
Chen Yubao (Note: Chen Yubao was removed at an unspecified date in August 1980.)	陈玉宝	Alternate	Nonmember	1937	1961	Alive	Shandong	Han	Male	
Chen Zuolin	陈作霖	Nonmember	Alternate	1923	1941	2015	Anhui	Han	Male	
Cheng Yitai	程义太	Nonmember	Nonmember	1948	1970	Alive	Shandong	Han	Male	
Dai Suli	戴苏理	Nonmember	Member	1919	1937	2000	Shanxi	Han	Male	
Deng Hua (Note: Deng Hua was removed at an unspecified date in July 1980.)	邓华	Alternate	Nonmember	1910	1927	1980	Hunan	Han	Male	
Ding Changhua	丁长华	Nonmember	Nonmember	1939	1958	2023	Jiangxi	Han	Female	
Du Ping	杜平	Member	Nonmember	1908	1930	1999	Jiangxi	Han	Male	
Du Xueran (Note: Du Xueran was removed at an unspecified date in 1980.)	杜学然	Nonmember	Nonmember	1931	1958	Alive	Henan	Han	Male	
Feng Pinde	冯品德	Alternate	Nonmember	1939	1966	Alive	Shandong	Han	Male	
Feng Zhanwu	冯占武	Alternate	Nonmember	1938	1956	Alive	Jilin	Han	Male	
Gao Houliang	高厚良	Nonmember	Alternate	1915	1933	2006	Henan	Han	Male	
Gu Xiulian	顾秀莲	Nonmember	Member	1936	1956	Alive	Jiangsu	Han	Female	
Guan Zehai	关泽海	Nonmember	Nonmember	1938	1960	Alive	Yunnan	Bai	Male	
Guo Fenglian	郭凤莲	Nonmember	Nonmember	1947	1966	Alive	Shanxi	Han	Female	
Guo Yaoqing	郭耀卿	Alternate	Nonmember	1935	1956	Alive	Guangxi	Zhuang	Male	
He Jinnian	贺晋年	Nonmember	Nonmember	1910	1928	2003	Shaanxi	Han	Male	
Hu Jindi	胡金娣	Alternate	Nonmember	1943	1966	Alive	Jiangsu	Han	Female	
Hu Liangcai	胡良才	Alternate	Nonmember	1939	1959	Alive	Hebei	Han	Male	
Hu Song	胡松	Nonmember	Nonmember	1927	1945	2000	Hainan	Han	Male	
Huang Ronghai	黄荣海	Alternate	Nonmember	1915	1935	1996	Jiangxi	Han	Male	
Huang Xinting	黄新廷	Nonmember	Member	1913	1932	2006	Hubei	Han	Male	
Huang Zuozhen	黄作珍	Alternate	Nonmember	1914	1930	1991	Jiangxi	Han	Male	
Janabil	贾那布尔	Alternate	Alternate	1934	1953	2024	Xinjiang	Kazakh	Male	
Ji Guixin	冀桂昕	Nonmember	Nonmember	1927	1955	Alive	Henan	Han	Male	
Ji Yinglin	纪英林	Nonmember	Nonmember	1931	1955	Alive	Liaoning	Han	Male	
Jiang Baodi	蒋宝娣	Alternate	Nonmember	1938	1961	Alive	Zhejiang	Han	Female	
Jiang Xieyuan	江燮元	Member	Nonmember	1915	1933	1990	Jiangxi	Han	Male	
Jin Minghan	金明汉	Nonmember	Nonmember	1922	1946	1999	Heilongjiang	Korean	Male	
Kang Lin	康林	Alternate	Nonmember	1916	1933	1995	Jiangxi	Han	Male	
Li Chang'an	李昌安	Nonmember	Nonmember	1935	1961	2021	Liaoning	Han	Male	
Li Chengfang	李成芳	Nonmember	Nonmember	1914	1931	1984	Hubei	Han	Male	
Li Huamin	李化民	Alternate	Alternate	1915	1933	2002	Gansu	Han	Male	
Li Jianzhen	李坚真	Nonmember	Nonmember	1907	1927	1992	Guangdong	Han	Female	
Li Jiliang	李继良	Nonmember	Nonmember	1937	1961	Alive	Henan	Han	Male	
Li Qiaoyun	李巧云	Nonmember	Nonmember	1944	1969	Alive	Jiangsu	Han	Female	
Li Rinai	厉日耐	Alternate	Nonmember	1935	1955	2002	Shandong	Han	Male	
Li Shoulin	李守林	Alternate	Nonmember	1927	1950	1992	Shaanxi	Han	Male	
Li Xuezhi	李学智	Nonmember	Member	1923	1938	2005	Jilin	Han	Male	
Li Yaowen	李耀文	Nonmember	Member	1918	1937	2018	Shandong	Han	Male	
Li Yuan	黎原	Alternate	Nonmember	1917	1938	2008	Henan	Han	Male	
Li Zugen	李祖根	Alternate	Nonmember	1939	1961	Alive	Jiangsu	Han	Male	
Liu Chonggui	刘重桂	Nonmember	Nonmember	1915	1935	2005	Jiangxi	Han	Male	
Liu Daosheng	刘道生	Nonmember	Nonmember	1915	1930	1995	Hunan	Han	Male	
Liu Minghui	刘明辉	Nonmember	Alternate	1914	1933	2010	Jiangxi	Han	Male	
Liu Ruiqing	刘瑞庆	Nonmember	Nonmember	1935	1955	Alive	Guangdong	Han	Male	
Liu Weiming	刘维明	Nonmember	Alternate	1938	1958	Alive	Hunan	Han	Male	
Liu Xiyao	刘西尧	Alternate	Nonmember	1916	1937	2013	Hunan	Han	Male	
Liu Zhenhua	刘振华	Alternate	Member	1921	1938	2018	Shandong	Han	Male	
Liu Zhijian	刘志坚	Nonmember	Member	1912	1931	2006	Hunan	Han	Male	
Liu Zhiqiang	柳志强	Nonmember	Nonmember	1931	1965	1993	Hunan	Han	Male	
Lu Jinlong	陆金龙	Alternate	Nonmember	1936	1965	Alive	Jiangsu	Han	Male	
Lu Zhongyang	卢忠阳	Alternate	Nonmember	1936	1959	Alive	Henan	Han	Male	
Lu Cunjie	吕存姐	Alternate	Nonmember	1939	1966	Alive	Qinghai	Tu	Female	
Lu He	吕和	Alternate	Nonmember	1911	1948	1979	Inner Mongolia	Han	Male	
Lu Xuguo	吕需国	Nonmember	Nonmember	1944	1969	Alive	Liaoning	Manchu	Male	
Ma Jinhua	马金花	Alternate	Nonmember	1938	1961	Alive	Ningxia	Hui	Female	
Ma Ming	马明	Alternate	Alternate	1937	1959	2012	Shanxi	Han	Male	
Ma Sizhong	马思忠	Nonmember	Alternate	1931	1947	2010	Ningxia	Hui	Male	
Mao Xinxian	毛信贤	Nonmember	Nonmember	1950	1975	Alive	Zhejiang	Han	Female	
Mei Songlin	梅松林	Nonmember	Nonmember	1941	1960	Alive	Hubei	Han	Male	
Pan Meiying	盘美英	Alternate	Nonmember	1930	1957	Alive	Guangxi	Yao	Female	
Pan Shixing	潘时兴	Nonmember	Nonmember	1947	1968	Alive	Fujian	Han	Male	
Qian Xuesen	钱学森	Alternate	Alternate	1911	1958	2009	Zhejiang	Han	Male	
Qilin Wangdan	七林旺丹	Alternate	Nonmember	1935	1959	2016	Yunnan	Tibetan	Male	
Ran Guiying	冉桂英	Nonmember	Nonmember	1937	1958	Alive	Gansu	Han	Female	
Raidi	热地	Nonmember	Member	1938	1961	2025	Tibet	Tibetan	Male	
Ren Zhibin	任质斌	Nonmember	Nonmember	1915	1934	1998	Shandong	Han	Male	
Renzeng Wangjie	仁增旺杰	Nonmember	Nonmember	1936	1963	Alive	Tibet	Tibetan	Male	
Rouzi Turdi (Note: Rouzi Turdi was removed at an unspecified date in July 1982.)	肉孜·吐尔迪	Alternate	Nonmember	1921	1952	1982	Xinjiang	Uyghur	Male	
Shen Chuyun	沈初云	Nonmember	Nonmember	1934	1952	Alive	Zhejiang	Han	Female	
Shen Maogong (Note: Shen Maogong was removed at an unspecified date in 1979.)	申茂功	Alternate	Nonmember	1940	1958	Alive	Henan	Han	Male	
Song Qingyou	宋庆友	Alternate	Nonmember	1938	1959	1988	Shandong	Han	Male	
Sun Xuemei	孙雪梅	Nonmember	Nonmember	1937	1956	Alive	Hunan	Han	Female	
Tan Shanhe	谭善和	Nonmember	Member	1915	1931	1991	Hunan	Han	Male	
Tan Wenzhen	谭文贞	Nonmember	Nonmember	1943	1970	Alive	Hunan	Han	Female	
Tang Kebi	唐克碧	Alternate	Nonmember	1942	1961	Alive	Sichuan	Han	Female	
Tang Liang	唐亮	Alternate	Nonmember	1910	1930	1986	Hunan	Han	Male	
Tang Wensheng	唐闻生	Alternate	Nonmember	1943	1959	Alive	United States	Han	Female	
Wang Fuzhi	王扶之	Nonmember	Alternate	1923	1936	Alive	Shaanxi	Han	Male	
Wang Jinling	王金玲	Nonmember	Nonmember	1948	1973	Alive	Tianjin	Han	Female	
Wang Jinshan	王金山	Nonmember	Alternate	1915	1938	1994	Hebei	Han	Male	
Wang Jinyou	王金友	Nonmember	Nonmember	1931	1956	2026	Zhejiang	Han	Male	
Wang Junshao	王君绍	Nonmember	Nonmember	1937	1973	Alive	Jilin	Han	Male	
Wang Liusheng	王六生	Alternate	Alternate	1917	1932	1995	Jiangxi	Han	Male	
Wang Shangrong	王尚荣	Nonmember	Nonmember	1915	1932	2000	Hubei	Han	Male	
Wei Fengying	尉凤英	Member	Nonmember	1933	1954	Alive	Liaoning	Han	Female	
Wei Xingzheng	魏兴政	Nonmember	Nonmember	1935	1960	Alive	Shandong	Han	Male	
Wen Xianglan	文香兰	Alternate	Nonmember	1934	1954	Alive	Henan	Han	Female	
Wu Huojin	吴火金	Nonmember	Nonmember	1943	1970	Alive	Jiangsu	Han	Male	
Wu Jinquan	吴金全	Alternate	Nonmember	1934	1954	Alive	Henan	Han	Female	
Wu Kehua	吴克华	Nonmember	Nonmember	1913	1929	1987	Jiangxi	Han	Male	
Wu Lengxi	吴冷西	Nonmember	Alternate	1919	1938	2002	Guangdong	Han	Male	
Wu Xiangbi	吴向必	Alternate	Alternate	1926	1952	1997	Guizhou	Miao	Male	
Wu Zhong	吴忠	Alternate	Nonmember	1921	1935	1990	Sichuan	Han	Male	
Xiang Zhonghua (Note: Xiang Zhonghua was removed at an unspecified date in May 1981.)	向仲华	Alternate	Nonmember	1912	1930	1981	Yannan	Han	Male	
Xiao Han	肖寒	Nonmember	Member	1926	1940	2019	Hebei	Han	Male	
Xiao Wangdong	肖望东	Nonmember	Nonmember	1910	1929	1989	Jiangxi	Han	Male	
Xie Zhengrong (Note: Xie Zhengrong was removed at an unspecified date in December 1977.)	谢正荣	Nonmember	Nonmember	1918	1935	1977	Hubei	Han	Male	
Xu Biaojun	许彪俊	Nonmember	Nonmember	1938	1966	Alive	Sichuan	Han	Male	
Xu Chi	徐驰	Alternate	Nonmember	1913	1956	2012	Hubei	Han	Male	
Xu Liqing	徐立清	Nonmember	Nonmember	1910	1930	1983	Henan	Han	Male	
Xue Jinlian	薛金莲	Alternate	Nonmember	1942	1964	Alive	Inner Mongolia	Han	Female	
Yang Dayi	杨大易	Alternate	Nonmember	1919	1934	1997	Sichuan	Han	Male	
Yang Fuzhen	杨富珍	Alternate	Nonmember	1932	1949	Alive	Jiangsu	Han	Female	
Yang Junsheng	杨俊生	Alternate	Nonmember	1916	1935	1998	Jiangxi	Han	Male	
Yang Yongliang	杨永良	Nonmember	Alternate	1944	1970	2012	Anhui	Han	Male	
Yuan Baohua	袁宝华	Nonmember	Member	1916	1936	2019	Henan	Han	Male	
Zhang Huailian	张怀连	Alternate	Nonmember	1933	1956	Alive	Shandong	Han	Male	
Zhang Jihui	张积慧	Alternate	Nonmember	1927	1945	2023	Shandong	Han	Male	
Zhang Linchi	张林池	Alternate	Nonmember	1911	1937	2002	Hebei	Han	Male	
Zhang Lingbin	张令彬	Alternate	Nonmember	1902	1926	1987	Hunan	Han	Male	
Zhang Yaoci	张耀词	Nonmember	Nonmember	1916	1935	2010	Jiangxi	Han	Male	
Zhang Zhen	张震	Nonmember	Member	1914	1930	2015	Hunan	Han	Male	
Zhang Zhidi	张植弟	Nonmember	Nonmember	1930	1958	1999	Hubei	Han	Male	
Zhao Wucheng	赵武成	Nonmember	Nonmember	1912	1937	2010	Shanxi	Han	Male	
Zhao Xingyuan	赵兴元	Alternate	Member	1925	1940	2016	Shandong	Han	Male	
Zhao Xuequan	赵学全	Nonmember	Nonmember	1935	1954	Alive	Yunnan	Han	Male	
Zheng Sansheng	郑三生	Alternate	Member	1917	1934	1990	Jiangxi	Han	Male	
Zhong Fuxiang	钟夫翔	Nonmember	Nonmember	1911	1930	1992	Guangxi	Han	Male	
Zhou Aqing	周阿庆	Nonmember	Alternate	1923	1956	2001	Zhejiang	Han	Male	
Zhou Zijian	周子健	Nonmember	Member	1914	1936	2003	Anhui	Han	Male	
Zhu Shaoqing	朱绍清	Nonmember	Nonmember	1912	1930	1989	Hunan	Han	Male	
Zou Jiahua	邹家华	Nonmember	Alternate	1926	1945	2025	Shanghai	Han	Male	
Zuo Chongyi	左崇义	Nonmember	Nonmember	1933	1956	2011	Hunan	Han	Male	
