= Xiao Han =

Xiao Han may refer to:

- Xiao Han (Liao dynasty) (蕭翰; died 949), Liao dynasty general
- Xiao Han (minister) (肖寒; 1926–2019), Minister of Coal Industry of China
- Xiao Han (speed skater) (肖涵; born 1994), Chinese speed skater
- Xiaohan (lyricist) (小寒), Singaporean lyricist

== See also ==
- Xiaohan (disambiguation)
