= Yuxiao =

Yuxiao is a Chinese given name. Notable people with the name include:

- Shi Yuxiao (1933–2005), Chinese general
- Lu Yuxiao (born 1999), Chinese actress
