= Wu Weiran =

Chinese medical scientist and politician

- 吴蔚然
- Born: 24 November 1920; Changshu, Jiangsu, China
- Died: 8 August 2016 (aged 95); Beijing, China
- Education: Yenching University; Peking Union Medical College; West China Union University
- Scientific career
- Fields: Medicine
- Workplaces: Beijing Hospital

Chinese name
- Simplified Chinese: 吴蔚然
- Traditional Chinese: 吳蔚然
Transcriptions
Standard Mandarin
- Hanyu Pinyin: Wú Wèirán

Wu Weiran (Chinese: 吴蔚然; 24 November 1920 – 8 August 2016) was a Chinese medical scientist and politician.

Wu was an alternate member of the 12th Central Committee of the Chinese Communist Party. He was a member of the 12th and 13th Central Committee of the Chinese Communist Party. He was a representative of the 14th National Congress of the Chinese Communist Party. He was a member of the Standing Committee of the 8th, 9th, 10th and 11th Chinese People's Political Consultative Conference.

== Biography ==
Wu was born in Changshu, Jiangsu, on 24 November 1920. His Wu Jieping was also a politician and physician. From 1938 to 1946, he successively studied at Yenching University, Peking Union Medical College, and West China Union University, obtaining a Bachelor of Science degree and a Doctor of Medicine degree.

After University in 1946, he worked at Beijing Zhonghe Hospital (later Peking University People's Hospital) and two years later moved to Beijing Capital Hospital (now Beijing Union Medical College Hospital). He joined the Chinese Communist Party (CCP) in 1956. From 1950 to 1951, he joined the Beijing Volunteer Surgery Team during the Korean War. In October 1973, he was transferred to Beijing Hospital and appointed vice president. He became honorary president in 1984.

On 8 August 2016, he died from an illness in Beijing, at the age of 95.

== Honours and awards ==
- 1996 Medal of Norman Bethune
