= Zhang Shou =

Chinese politician

- 张寿
- Born: 1930; Changshu, Jiangsu, China
- Died: 1 October 2001 (aged 70–71); Beijing, China
- Education: Shanghai Jiao Tong University
- Political party: Chinese Communist Party

Chinese name
- Simplified Chinese: 张寿
- Traditional Chinese: 張壽
Transcriptions
Standard Mandarin
- Hanyu Pinyin: Zhāng Shòu

Zhang Shou (Chinese: 张寿; 1930 – 1 October 2001) was a Chinese politician.

He was a member of the 12th and 13th Central Committee of the Chinese Communist Party. He was a member of the Standing Committee of the 8th and 9th National People's Congress.

== Early life and education ==
Zhang was born in Changshu, Jiangsu, in 1930. He graduated from Shanghai Jiao Tong University and worked there after graduation.

== Career ==
In 1958, he was appointed as deputy director of the Shanghai Atomic Energy Professional Committee.

After the Cultural Revolution in 1976, he became deputy party secretary of Shanghai Jiaotong University. In 1982, he was chosen as deputy director of the National Planning Commission (now National Development and Reform Commission). In 1989, he was selected as general manager of China State Shipbuilding Corporation, a state owned shipbuilding enterprise which is known as China Shipbuilding Corporation. He was deputy director of the Economic and Trade Office of the State Council.

On 1 October 2001, he died in Beijing, at the age of 71.
