= Jiang Xinxiong =

Chinese business executive and politician

- 蒋心雄

General Manager of the China National Nuclear Corporation
- In office May 1988 – January 1999
- Preceded by: New title
- Succeeded by: Li Dingfan

Minister of Nuclear Industry
- In office June 1983 – May 1988
- Premier: Zhao Ziyang; Li Peng
- Preceded by: Zhang Chen
- Succeeded by: Position revoked

Personal details
- Born: July 1931 (age 95) Nanxun, Zhejiang, China
- Party: Chinese Communist Party
- Education: Nankai University

Chinese name
- Simplified Chinese: 蒋心雄
- Traditional Chinese: 蔣心雄
Transcriptions
Standard Mandarin
- Hanyu Pinyin: Jiǎng Xīnxióng

Jiang Xinxiong (Chinese: 蒋心雄; born July 1931) is a Chinese business executive and politician who served as minister of nuclear industry from 1983 to 1985 and general manager of the China National Nuclear Corporation from 1988 to 1999.

He was a member of the 12th, 13th and 14th Central Committee of the Chinese Communist Party.

== Biography ==
Jiang was born in the town of Nanxun, Zhejiang, in July 1931. In 1949, he enrolled at Nankai University, majoring in machine manufacturing.

After graduating in 1952, he was assigned to Jixi Mining Machinery Factory as a technician. He joined the Chinese Communist Party (CCP) in April 1956. Starting in June 1958, he successively served as engineer, section chief, shift director, deputy workshop director, workshop director, deputy director of the Revolutionary Committee, deputy secretary of the Communist Party Committee, factory director, and senior engineer of the Plant 504, China's first enriched uranium production plant in Lanzhou, northwest China's Gansu province.

In April 1982, he was promoted to become vice minister of atomic energy industry, but having held the position for only one year. In June 1983, he was promoted again to become minister of nuclear industry. In May 1988, he was appointed general manager of the newly founded China National Nuclear Corporation, and held that office for more than ten year. During his term in office, he organized and participated in the construction of both Qinshan Nuclear Power Plant and Daya Bay Nuclear Power Plant. In March 1998, he took office as vice chairperson of the National People's Congress Financial and Economic Affairs Committee.

Government offices
Preceded by Zhang Chen	Minister of Nuclear Industry; 1983–1988	Succeeded by Position revoked
Business positions
New title	General Manager of the China National Nuclear Corporation; 1988–1999	Succeeded by Li Dingfan (李定凡)
