= Liang Dongcai =

Chinese scientist and politician (1932–2026)

- 梁栋材
- Born: 29 May 1932; Nanhai County, Guangdong, China
- Died: 18 January 2026 (aged 93); Beijing, China
- Education: Sun Yat-sen University; Academy of Sciences of the Soviet Union
- Children: 2
- Scientific career
- Fields: Molecular biophysics
- Workplaces: Chinese Academy of Sciences
- Academic advisors: Dorothy Hodgkin

Chinese name
- Simplified Chinese: 梁栋材
- Traditional Chinese: 梁棟材
Transcriptions
Standard Mandarin
- Hanyu Pinyin: Liáng Dòngcái

Liang Dongcai (Chinese: 梁栋材; 29 May 1932 – 18 January 2026) was a Chinese molecular biophysicist, politician and an academician of the Chinese Academy of Sciences.

Liang was an alternate member of the 12th Central Committee of the Chinese Communist Party and a member of the 13th and 14th Central Committee of the Chinese Communist Party.

== Early life and career ==
Liang was born into a poor family in Nanhai County (now Liwan District of Guangzhou), Guangdong, on 29 May 1932. He was the sixth of nine children. Two of the nine children in the family died prematurely due to poverty.

He attended Guangzhou No. 1 High School. In 1951, he enrolled at Sun Yat-sen University, majoring in chemistry. After university in 1956, he was sent to study at the Academy of Sciences of the Soviet Union on government scholarships, where he earned his vice-doctorate degree in 1960.

In April 1960, after returning to China, Liang and the scientific researchers of the Institute of Computing Technology started the research on the calculation program. On the basis of the 104-electron tube computer built by China, he established the first set of calculation program for small molecule structure analysis, and successfully determined the crystal structure of a batch of organic compounds by using the program, which has laid an important foundation for the development of single crystal structure analysis of small molecules and the study of crystal structure of biological macromolecules in China.

At the end of 1965, the Chinese Academy of Sciences sent Liang to study in the United Kingdom, becoming the first researcher in China to contact and enter the field of X-ray crystallography. He first studied at the Royal Institution, and then transferred to Oxford University to study with Dorothy Hodgkin, a famous crystallographer and Nobel Prize-winner.

Liang returned to China in early 1967, with the support of Marshal Nie Rongzhen and other researchers, he set up the Beijing Insulin Crystal Structure Research Collaboration Group (北京胰岛素晶体结构研究协作组). At the end of 1969, he successfully solved the high-resolution structure of insulin and completed the determination of the crystal structure of porcine insulin with a resolution of 2.5 angstroms, making China officially enter the ranks of international X-ray crystallography.

In 1983, he became director of the Institute of Biophysics, Chinese Academy of Sciences, and served until 1986, when he was appointed deputy director of the National Natural Science Foundation of China. In 1989, he co-founded the State Key Laboratory of biomacromolecules with Chen-Lu Tsou and Yang Fuyu, and served as its deputy director.

== Personal life and death ==
Liang had two sons. He died on 18 January 2026, at the age of 93.

== Honours and awards ==
- 1980 Member of the Chinese Academy of Sciences (CAS)
- 1982 State Natural Science Award (Second Class)
- 1989 State Natural Science Award (Second Class)
- 1985 Fellow of The World Academy of Sciences (TWAS)
- 1995 Science and Technology Progress Award of the Ho Leung Ho Lee Foundation
