= Zhao Zongnai =

- 赵宗鼐

Vice Minister of Personnel
- In office January 1988 – 1995

Deputy Head of the Organization Department of the Chinese Communist Party
- In office January 1988 – October 1994

Personal details
- Born: April 4, 1928 (age 98) Beijing, China
- Party: Chinese Communist Party
- Education: Tsinghua University

Chinese name
- Simplified Chinese: 赵宗鼐
- Traditional Chinese: 趙宗鼐
Transcriptions
Standard Mandarin
- Hanyu Pinyin: Zhào Zōngnài

Zhao Zongnai (Chinese: 赵宗鼐; born 4 April 1928) is a Chinese politician.

He was an alternate member of the 12th Central Committee of the Chinese Communist Party and a member of the 13th Central Committee of the Chinese Communist Party. He was a member of the 14th Central Commission for Discipline Inspection.

== Career ==
Zhao was born in Beijing, on 4 April 1928. Zhao joined the Chinese Communist Party (CCP) in 1948, during his freshman year.

After graduating from the Department of Chemical Engineering, Tsinghua University in 1951, he became a staff member of the Personnel Department of the Yumen Mining Bureau of the Northwest Petroleum Administration and director of the Laboratory of the Oil Production Plant, and was promoted to gas injection engineer and deputy party secretary at the Oil Production Plant. In 1959, he was wrongly punished and demoted to become a worker and was reinstated as deputy manager of the No.2 Oil Mine and manager of the Laojunmiao Oil Mine two years later. In 1966, the Cultural Revolution broke out, he was removed from office and effectively sidelined. He was reinstated as leader of the Production Team at Laojunmiao Oil Mine in 1969. He was elevated to chief engineer and deputy manager of the Laojunmiao Oil Mine in 1972. In 1978 he was promoted again to become deputy secretary, director and chief engineer of Yumen Petroleum Management Bureau.

Zhao was transferred to Beijing in 1981 and appointed secretary of the Offshore Oil Exploration Bureau of the Ministry of Petroleum Industry and deputy general manager of China National Offshore Oil Corporation. He rose to become vice minister and deputy party group secretary of petroleum industry in August 1982. In April 1986, he was made executive deputy secretary of the Committee of Directly Affiliated Organs of the CCP Central Committee, but having held the position for only one year and nine months. He was chosen as deputy head of the Organization Department of the Chinese Communist Party in January 1988, in addition to serving as vice minister of personnel.
