= Qi Yuanjing =

Chinese engineer and politician

- 戚元靖

Minister of Metallurgical Industry
- In office August 1985 – March 1993
- Premier: Zhao Ziyang; Li Peng
- Preceded by: Li Dongzhi
- Succeeded by: Liu Qi

Personal details
- Born: 4 April 1929 Hankou, Hubei, China
- Died: November 4, 1994 (aged 65) Beijing, China
- Party: Chinese Communist Party
- Education: Beijing Institute of Technology; Harbin Institute of Technology; Dalian University of Technology; Leningrad Institute of Architectural Engineering
- Scientific career
- Fields: Metallurgy; Architectural engineering
- Institutions: Ministry of Metallurgical Industry

Qi Yuanjing (Chinese: 戚元靖; pinyin: Qī Yuánjìng; 4 April 1929 – 4 November 1994) was a Chinese engineer who was minister of metallurgical industry from 1985 to 1993.

He was an alternate member of the 12th Central Committee of the Chinese Communist Party and a member of the 13th and 14th Central Committee of the Chinese Communist Party. He was a member of the Standing Committee of the 8th National People's Congress.

== Biography ==
Qi was born in Hankou (now Wuhan), Hubei, on 4 April 1929. His elder sister Qi Yuande and brother-in-law Wu Defeng were both Communist politicians. At the beginning of 1938, he came to Yan'an with his elder sister, where he graduated from Yan'an Academy of Natural Sciences (now Beijing Institute of Technology). He joined the Chinese Communist Party (CCP) in November 1945. He enrolled at Harbin Institute of Technology in 1948 and then Dalian University of Technology in 1950. In 1951, he was sent to study at Leningrad Institute of Architectural Engineering on government scholarships.

Qi returned to China in 1956 and was assigned to the General Institute of Ferrous Metallurgy Design, Ministry of Metallurgical Industry (now Beijing Central Engineering and Research Incorporation of Iron and Steel Industry), where he successively served as engineer, deputy section chief, leader of the engineering design team, deputy party secretary of the institute, senior engineer, vice president, and president. He was promoted to vice minister of metallurgical industry in 1982. In September 1985, he was promoted again to become minister of metallurgical industry. In June 1991, he was diagnosed with stomach cancer. In 1993, he took office as vice chairperson of the National People's Congress Environment Protection and Resources Conservation Committee.

On 4 November 1994, he died of stomach cancer in Beijing, at the age of 65.

== Honours and awards ==
- 1994 Member of the Chinese Academy of Engineering (CAE)

Government offices
| Preceded by Li Dongzhi | Minister of Metallurgical Industry; 1985–1993 | Succeeded by Liu Qi |
