= Wu Rongsheng =

Chinese meteorologist

- 伍荣生
- Born: 17 January 1934; Rui'an County, Zhejiang, China
- Died: 22 August 2025 (aged 91); Nanjing, Jiangsu, China
- Education: Nanjing University
- Spouse: Feng Ruiying
- Scientific career
- Fields: Meteorology
- Workplaces: Nanjing University

Chinese name
- Simplified Chinese: 伍荣生
- Traditional Chinese: 伍榮生
Transcriptions
Standard Mandarin
- Hanyu Pinyin: Wǔ Róngshēng

Wu Rongsheng (Chinese: 伍荣生; 17 January 1934 – 22 August 2025) was a Chinese meteorologist who was a professor at Nanjing University, a former president of the Chinese Meteorological Society, and an academician of the Chinese Academy of Sciences.

== Biography ==
Wu was born in Rui'an County, Zhejiang, on 17 January 1934, to Wu Minhang (伍敏行), a teacher. His uncle Wu Xianwen was a zoologist, his brother-in-law Liu Jiankang was an ichthyologist, his cousin Sun Yisui was an astrophysicist, all were members of the Chinese Academy of Sciences. Wu attended Rui'an High School. In 1952, he enrolled at Nanjing University, where he majored in the Department of Meteorology.

After graduation in 1956, Wu stayed for teaching. In 1983, he joined the Chinese Communist Party (CCP). In 2002, he was proposed as president of the Chinese Meteorological Society.

Wu died on 22 August 2025 in Nanjing, Jiangsu, at the age of 91.

== Family ==
Wu married Feng Ruiying (冯蕊英), with whom he had a son Wu Ruixin (伍瑞新).

== Honours and awards ==
- 1999 Member of the Chinese Academy of Sciences (CAS)

Academic offices
Preceded by Zeng Qingcun	President of the Chinese Meteorological Society; 2002–2006	Succeeded by Qin Dahe
