= Zhao Xianshun =

- 赵先顺

Commander of the Lanzhou Military Region
- In office 5 June 1985 – May 1990
- Preceded by: New title
- Succeeded by: Fu Quanyou

Personal details
- Born: 1924 Yongcheng County, Henan, China
- Died: 2002 (aged 77–78) Beijing, China
- Party: Chinese Communist Party
- Education: PLA Nanjing Military Academy

Military service
- Allegiance: People's Republic of China
- Branch/service: People's Liberation Army Ground Force
- Years of service: 1939–2002
- Rank: Lieutenant general
- Battles/wars: Second Sino-Japanese War; Chinese Civil War; Korean War

Chinese name
- Simplified Chinese: 赵先顺
- Traditional Chinese: 趙先順
Transcriptions
Standard Mandarin
- Hanyu Pinyin: Zhào Xiānshùn

Zhao Xianshun (Chinese: 赵先顺; 1924 – 2 February 2002) was a lieutenant general (zhongjiang) of the People's Liberation Army (PLA) who served as commander of the Lanzhou Military Region from 1985 to 1990. He was a delegate to the 4th, 5th and 6th National People's Congress. He was a member of the 12th and 13th Central Committee of the Chinese Communist Party. He was a member of the Standing Committee of the 8th Chinese People's Political Consultative Conference.

== Biography ==
Zhao was born in Shunhe Township, Yongcheng County (now Yongcheng), Henan, in 1924. He enlisted in the New Fourth Army in 1939, joined the Chinese Communist Party (CCP) in the same year. He served in the 3rd Division during the Second Sino-Japanese War. During the Chinese Civil War, he served in the war and engaged in the Campaign to Defend Siping, Liaoshen campaign, Pingjin campaign, and the Battle of Hengbao. In 1952, he was called to active duty for the Korean War.

In August 1955, he entered the PLA Nanjing Military Academy, where he graduated in 1958. In June 1985, he was promoted to become commander of the Lanzhou Military Region, a position he held until May 1990.

He attained the rank of lieutenant general (zhongjiang) in 1988.

On 2 February 2002, he died of an illness in Beijing, at the age of 77.

Military offices
New title	Commander of the Lanzhou Military Region; 1985–1990	Succeeded by Fu Quanyou
