= Qin Zhongda =

Chinese politician

- 秦仲达

Minister of Petrochemical Industry
- In office March 1982 – July 1989
- Premier: Zhao Ziyang; Li Peng
- Preceded by: Sun Jingwen
- Succeeded by: Gu Xiulian

Personal details
- Born: September 1923 Rongcheng County, Shandong, China
- Died: 23 March 2021 (aged 97) Beijing, China
- Party: Chinese Communist Party

Chinese name
- Simplified Chinese: 秦仲达
- Traditional Chinese: 秦仲達
Transcriptions
Standard Mandarin
- Hanyu Pinyin: Qín Zhòngdá

Qin Zhongda (Chinese: 秦仲达; September 1923 – 23 March 2021) was a Chinese politician who served as minister of petrochemical industry from 1982 to 1989.

He was a representative of the 12th and 13th National Congress of the Chinese Communist Party. He was a member of the 12th and 13th. He was a member of the Standing Committee of the 8th National People's Congress.

== Career ==
Qin was born in Rongcheng County (now Rongcheng), Shandong, in September 1923. He enlisted in the People's Liberation Army (PLA) in 1942 and served in the PLA Shandong Military District. He joined the Chinese Communist Party (CCP) in April 1944. Starting from September 1946, he successively served as head of Works Department, deputy manager, and manager of Dalian Chemical Factory.

He was transferred to the Ministry of Chemical Industry in 1956, and served in several posts there, including deputy director of the Infrastructure Department, deputy director of the Equipment Department and director of the Chemical Machinery Research Institute, deputy director of the Technology Supply Bureau, deputy director of the Infrastructure Bureau, director of the Production Scheduling Bureau, and director of the Production Office.

During the ten-year Cultural Revolution, he was sent to the May Seventh Cadre Schools to do farm works.

He was reinstated as deputy leader of the Comprehensive Planning Group of the Ministry of Petrochemical Industry in January 1975. In April 1978, he became vice minister, rising to minister in March 1982. He retired in October 1999.

On 23 March 2021, he died of an illness, in Beijing, at the age of 97.

Government offices
Preceded by Sun Jingwen	Minister of Petrochemical Industry; 1982–1989	Succeeded by Gu Xiulian
