= Wu Wenying =

Chinese politician

- 吴文英

Minister of Textile Industry
- In office June 1983 – March 1993
- Premier: Zhao Ziyang; Li Peng
- Preceded by: Hao Jianxiu
- Succeeded by: Position revoked

Personal details
- Born: 1932 Changzhou, Jiangsu, China
- Died: 2007 (aged 74–75) Beijing, China
- Party: Chinese Communist Party
- Education: Donghua University

Chinese name
- Simplified Chinese: 吴文英
- Traditional Chinese: 吳文英
Transcriptions
Standard Mandarin
- Hanyu Pinyin: Wú Wényīng

Wu Wenying (Chinese: 吴文英; 1932 – 26 April 2007) was a Chinese politician who served as minister of textile industry from 1983 to 1993.

She was a member of the 12th, 13th and 14th Central Committee of the Chinese Communist Party. She was a member of the Standing Committee of the 9th Chinese People's Political Consultative Conference.

== Biography ==
Wu was born in Changzhou, Jiangsu, in 1932.

She joined the Chinese Communist Party (CCP) in September 1949. After graduating from East China Institute of Textile Technology (now Donghua University) in 1963, she became an official in Changzhou municipal government. In June 1983, she was promoted to become minister of textile industry, a position she held until March 1993. She retired in May 2001.

On 26 April 2007, she died from an illness in Beijing, at the age of 75.

== Investigation ==
In 2000, Wu was placed on two-year probation within the Party (留党察看二年) for serious violations of discipline.

Government offices
Preceded by Hao Jianxiu	Minister of Textile Industry; 1983–1993	Succeeded by Position revoked
