= Chen Yuying =

Chinese engineer and politician

- 陈玉英

Chairwoman of Changzhou Municipal People's Congress
- In office 1984 – January 1998
- Preceded by: Cheng Weigao
- Succeeded by: Yu Zhenxin

Communist Party Secretary of Changzhou
- In office February 1984 – March 1994
- Preceded by: Cheng Weigao
- Succeeded by: Yu Zhenxin
- Deputy: Cao Jincheng; Yang Xiaotang; Meng Jinyuan

Personal details
- Born: October 1933 (age 92) Changzhou, Jiangsu, China
- Party: Chinese Communist Party
- Education: Donghua University

Chinese name
- Simplified Chinese: 陈玉英
- Traditional Chinese: 陳玉英
Transcriptions
Standard Mandarin
- Hanyu Pinyin: Chén Yùyīng

Chen Yuying (Chinese: 陈玉英; born October 1933) is a Chinese engineer and politician. She was a member of the 13th and 14th Central Committee of the Chinese Communist Party.

== Biography ==
Chen was born in Changzhou, Jiangsu, in October 1933. Sjoined the Chinese Communist Party (CCP) in September 1952. In 1962, she enrolled at East China Institute of Textile Science and Technology (now Donghua University), majoring in cotton spinning, where she graduated in 1962.

Beginning in 1946, she served in several posts at Dacheng No. 1 Textile Factory, including worker, party branch secretary, and workshop director. In 1975, she was promoted to become factory manager of Changzhou No. 3 National Cotton Factory, a position she held until 1981.

Chen got involved in politics in 1981, when she was appointed deputy director of Changzhou Textile Industry Bureau and vice president of Jiangsu Provincial Trade Unions Federation. In 1983, she became deputy party secretary of Changzhou, rising to party secretary the next year. She also served as chairwoman of Changzhou Municipal People's Congress from 1984 to January 1998.

Party political offices
| Preceded by Cheng Weigao | Communist Party Secretary of Changzhou; 1984–1994 | Succeeded by Yu Zhenxin (虞振新) |
Assembly seats
| Preceded by Cheng Weigao | Chairwoman of Changzhou Municipal People's Congress; 1984–1998 | Succeeded by Yu Zhenxin |
