= Shen Zulun =

Chinese politician (1931–2023)

Shen Zulun (Chinese: 沈祖伦; March 1931 – 27 February 2023) was a Chinese politician who served as Governor of Zhejiang Province.

== Biography ==
A native of Ningbo, Zhejiang, Shen joined the Chinese Communist Party (CCP) in April 1948. Before the formation of PR China, Shen served in Cixi County (now Cixi City) and Ningbo Region. From 1950, he became a secretary and vice section chief of secretary section in CCP Ningbo municipal committee. He also served as a personal secretary to Jiang Hua, the then first secretary of the Zhejiang Provincial Committee of the Chinese Communist Party. Shen was sacked in Cultural Revolution. In 1973, he entered the general office of CCP Zhejiang committee.

From 1977 to 1987, Shen served as vice Party chief of Shaoxing County, vice director of Reform Commission of Shaoxing, the CCP Committee Secretary of Shaoxing City, vice director of Zhejiang Agricultural Commission, vice Party chief of Jiaxing, and the secretary general of Zhejiang provincial government. In 1983, he was appointed vice governor of Zhejiang and a standing committee member of CCP Zhejiang committee. Shen also served as the commander and chief of staff of Zhejiang Provincial Military Region, and the chairman of Zhejiang Foreign Relation Association.

In September 1987, Shen was elevated to vice secretary of CCP Zhejiang committee, and was soon appointed acting governor of Zhejiang. In February 1988, Shen was confirmed as the governor of Zhejiang.

Shen was a delegate to 7th National People's Congress, and a standing committee member of 8th and 9th Chinese People's Political Consultative Conference (CPPCC). Shen was a member of 13th Central Committee of the Chinese Communist Party.

Shen died on 27 February 2023, at the age of 91.

Political offices
Preceded by Xue Ju	Governor of Zhejiang; 1988–1990	Succeeded by Ge Hongsheng
