= Zhang Zhongxian =

Chinese politician (1926–2022)

- 张仲先

Political Commissar of Guangzhou Military Region
- In office June 1985 – October 1992
- Commander: You Taizhong; Zhang Wannian; Liu Cunzhi; Zhu Dunfa
- Preceded by: Wang Meng
- Succeeded by: Shi Yuxiao

Personal details
- Born: January 1926 Lincheng County, Shandong, China
- Died: 5 March 2022 (aged 96) Guangzhou, Guangdong, China
- Party: Chinese Communist Party

Military service
- Allegiance: People's Republic of China
- Branch/service: Eighth Route Army; People's Volunteer Army; People's Liberation Army Ground Force
- Years of service: 1940–1992
- Rank: Lieutenant general
- Commands: Guangzhou Military Region
- Battles/wars: Second Sino-Japanese War; Battle of Hainan Island; Korean War
- Awards: Order of Independence and Freedom (3rd Class); Order of Liberation (China) (3rd Class); PLA Merit Medal

Chinese name
- Simplified Chinese: 张仲先
- Traditional Chinese: 張仲先
Transcriptions
Standard Mandarin
- Hanyu Pinyin: Zhāng Zhòngxiān

Zhang Zemin
- Simplified Chinese: 张泽民
- Traditional Chinese: 張澤民
Transcriptions
Standard Mandarin
- Hanyu Pinyin: Zhāng Zémín

Zhang Zhongxian (Chinese: 张仲先; January 1926 – 5 March 2022) was a Chinese lieutenant general (zhongjiang) of the People's Liberation Army (PLA) who served as political commissar of Guangzhou Military Region between 1985 and 1992. He was a representative of the 13th and 14th National Congress of the Chinese Communist Party. He was an alternate member of the 12th Central Committee of the Chinese Communist Party and a member of the 16th and 13th Central Committee of the Chinese Communist Party. He was a member of the Standing Committee of the 8th National People's Congress.

== Biography ==
Zhang was born Zhang Zemin (张泽民) in Lincheng County (now Weishan County), Shandong, in January 1926. He enlisted in the Eighth Route Army in 1940 and joined the Chinese Communist Party in the following year.

During the Second Sino-Japanese War, he fought with the Imperial Japanese Army in southern Shandong. During the Chinese Civil War, he took part in the Liaoshen campaign. After the founding of the Communist State, he was present at the Battle of Hainan Island and soon participated in the Korean War. In June 1985, he was promoted to become political commissar of Guangzhou Military Region, a position he held until October 1992. He was promoted to the rank of lieutenant general (zhongjiang) in 1988.

Zhang died in Guangzhou, Guangdong on 5 March 2022, at the age of 96.

Military offices
Preceded by Wang Meng	Political Commissar of Guangzhou Military Region; 1985–1992	Succeeded by Shi Yuxiao
