= Xiaohan (disambiguation) =

Xiaohan is one of the solar terms of several East Asian calendars.

Xiaohan may also refer to:

- Xiaohan (lyricist), Singaporean lyricist
- Xiaohan (region), a region in China

== See also ==
- Xiao Han (disambiguation)
