= Zhao Yannian =

Chinese politician (1929–2019)

Zhao Yannian (Chinese: 赵延年; July 1929 – 18 October 2019) was a Chinese politician. An ethnic Hui, he served as Vice Minister of the State Ethnic Affairs Commission from 1986 to 2003.

== Biography ==
Zhao Yannian was born in July 1929 in Nanzhao County, Henan, Republic of China. He was a member of the Hui ethnic group.

Zhao joined the Chinese Communist Party in March 1950. From 1954, he served as deputy magistrate and county magistrate of Nanyang County. In 1958, he was transferred to Ningxia Hui Autonomous Region, where he served as deputy director of the Policy Research Office, deputy director of the Office of the Party Committee, and deputy director of the Rural Work Office of the Party Committee.

Zhao was persecuted during the Cultural Revolution. After his political rehabilitation, he served as director of the Policy Research Office of the Ningxia Hui Autonomous Regional Committee of the Chinese Communist Party in April 1978.

From April 1979, Zhao served as head of the Planning Bureau and then head of the Foreign Affairs Bureau of the National Agricultural Committee. He later became Director of the Agricultural Bureau of the State Economic Commission. In May 1986, he was appointed Vice Minister of the State Ethnic Affairs Commission, serving until his retirement in December 2003. He was an alternate member of the 13th and 14th Central Committee of the Chinese Communist Party.

Zhao died on 18 October 2019 in Beijing, aged 90.
