= Zeng Qingcun =

Chinese meteorologist and politician (born 1935)

- 曾庆存
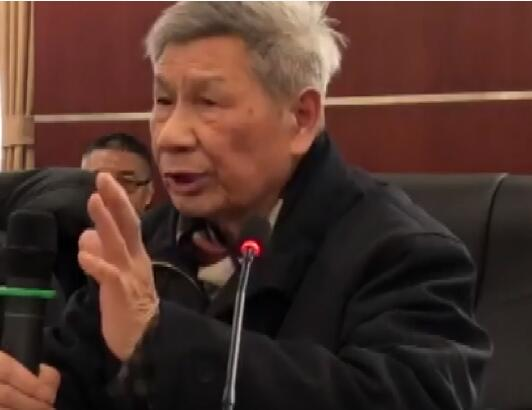
- Zeng in January 2020

Member of the 9th and 10th National Committee of the Chinese People's Political Consultative Conference
- In office 1998–2008
- Chairman: Li Ruihuan; Jia Qinglin

Alternate Member of the 13th and 14th Central Committee of the Chinese Communist Party
- In office 1987–1997
- General Secretary: Zhao Ziyang; Jiang Zemin

Delegate to the 6th National People's Congress
- In office 1983–1988
- Chairman: Peng Zhen

Personal details
- Born: 4 May 1935 (age 91) Yangjiang County, Guangdong, Republic of China
- Party: Chinese Communist Party
- Education: Peking University; Russian Academy of Sciences
- Scientific career
- Fields: Meteorology
- Workplaces: Institute of Atmospheric Physics, Chinese Academy of Sciences
- Doctoral advisor: Ilya Kibel

Chinese name
- Simplified Chinese: 曾慶存
- Traditional Chinese: 曾庆存
Transcriptions
Standard Mandarin
- Hanyu Pinyin: Zēng Qìngcún

Zeng Qingcun (born 4 May 1935) is a Chinese meteorologist and politician, and an academician of the Chinese Academy of Sciences. He was a member of the 9th and 10th National Committee of the Chinese People's Political Consultative Conference and a delegate to the 6th National People's Congress. He was an alternate member of the 13th and 14th Central Committee of the Chinese Communist Party.

== Biography ==
Zeng was born into a poor farmer's family in Yangjiang County, Guangdong, on 4 May 1935, during the Republic of China. He secondary studied at Liangyang High School. In 1952, he enrolled in Peking University, majoring in meteorology, where he graduated in 1956. In November 1956, he was sent abroad to study at the Institute of Geophysics of the Academy of Sciences of Soviet Union (now Russian Academy of Sciences) at the expense of the government, obtaining a vice-doctorate under the direction of Ilya Kibel in 1961.

Zeng returned to China in 1961 and that same year was assigned to the Institute of Geophysics, Chinese Academy of Sciences, where he successively worked as assistant researcher and researcher. In January 1961, he was transferred to the newly founded Institute of Atmospheric Physics, in which he moved up the ranks to become director in 1984. He was a senior visiting scholar at Princeton University between December 1980 and April 1982. In 1995, he was proposed as president of China Society for Industrial and Applied Mathematics (CSIAM), succeeding Xiao Shutie. In 1998, he was unanimously chosen as president of China Meteorological Society which he held only from 1998 to 2002, although he remained as president of China Society for Industrial and Applied Mathematics until 2000.

== Honours and awards ==
- 1980 Member of the Chinese Academy of Sciences
- 1988 State Natural Science Award (Second Class)
- 1994 Foreign Academician of the Russian Academy of Sciences
- 1995 Member of the Third World Academy of Sciences
- 1995 Science and Technology Progress Award of the Ho Leung Ho Lee Foundation
- 2005 State Natural Science Award (Second Class)
- 2014 Honorary Member of the American Meteorological Society
- 2020 Highest Science and Technology Award
- 2021 Asian Scientist 100, Asian Scientist

Cultural offices
Preceded by Xiao Shutie	President of China Society for Industrial and Applied Mathematics; 1995–2000	Succeeded by Li Qaqian
Preceded by Zou Jingmeng	President of China Meteorological Society; 1998–2002	Succeeded by Wu Rongsheng
