= 13th Central Committee of the Chinese Communist Party =

Chinese governing body, 1987–1992

The 13th Central Committee of the Chinese Communist Party was in session from 1987 to 1992. It held seven plenary sessions. It was preceded by the 12th Central Committee and succeeded by the 14th Central Committee. It elected the 13th Politburo of the Chinese Communist Party in 1987.

== List of members ==
In stroke order of surnames:

1. Ding Guangen (丁关根)
2. Ding Henggao (丁衡高)
3. Yu Yongbo (于永波)
4. Yu Hong'en (于洪恩)
5. Wan Li
6. Wan Shaofen (万绍芬)
7. Wang Tao (王涛)
8. Wang Hai (王海)
9. Wang Meng (王蒙)
10. Wang Qun (王群)
11. Wang Bingqian (王丙乾)
12. Wang Hanbin (王汉斌)
13. Wang Chengbin (王成斌)
14. Wang Renzhong (王任重)
15. Wang Zhaoguo
16. Wang Renzhi (王忍之)
17. Wang Maolin (王茂林)
18. Wang Chaowen (王朝文)
19. Wang Senhao (王森浩)
20. Wang Ruilin (王瑞林)
21. Mao Zhiyong (毛致用)
22. Yin Kesheng (尹克升)
23. Ai Zhisheng (艾知生)
24. Buhe (布赫)
25. Lu Rongjing (卢荣景)
26. Ye Xuanping
27. Tian Jiyun
28. Shi Yuxiao (史玉孝)
29. Bai Lichen (白立忱)
30. Ismail Amat (司马义·艾买提)
31. Xing Chongzhi (邢崇智)
32. Lü Peijian (吕培俭)
33. Zhu Xun (朱训)
34. Zhu Guang (朱光)
35. Zhu Liang (朱良)
36. Zhu Guangya (朱光亚)
37. Qiao Shi
38. Wu Shaozu (伍绍祖)
39. Wu Jinghua (伍精华)
40. Ren Jianxin
41. Hua Guofeng
42. Quan Shuren (全树仁)
43. Doje Cering (多吉才让)
44. Liu Zhengwei (刘正威)
45. Liu Anyuan (刘安元)
46. Liu Zhenhua (刘振华)
47. Liu Jingsong (刘精松)
48. Guan Guangfu (关广富)
49. Jiang Zemin
50. Xu Shijie (许士杰)
51. Ruan Chongwu
52. Sun Weiben (孙维本)
53. Rui Xingwen (芮杏文)
54. Li Peng
55. Li Jiulong (李九龙)
56. Li Ziqi (李子奇)
57. Li Changchun (李长春)
58. Li Ligong (李立功)
59. Li Xuge (李旭阁)
60. Li Jijun (李际均)
61. Li Zemin (李泽民)
62. Li Guixian (李贵鲜)
63. Li Genshen (李根深)
64. Li Tieying (李铁映)
65. Li Qianyuan (李乾元)
66. Li Menghua (李梦华)
67. Li Ruihuan
68. Li Ximing (李锡铭)
69. Li Xinliang (李新良)
70. Li Dezhu (李德洙)
71. Yang Zhengwu (杨正午)
72. Yang Baibing
73. Yang Rudai (杨汝岱)
74. Yang Xizong (杨析综)
75. Yang Shangkun
76. Yang Taifang (杨泰芳)
77. Yang Jingren (杨静仁)
78. Yang Dezhong (杨德中)
79. Wu Wenying (吴文英)
80. Wu Guanzheng
81. Wu Xueqian (吴学谦)
82. Wu Weiran (吴蔚然)
83. He Kang
84. He Dongchang (何东昌)
85. He Zhukang (何竹康)
86. Zou Jiahua (邹家华)
87. Shen Daren (沈达人)
88. Shen Zulun (沈祖伦)
89. Song Ping (宋平)
90. Song Jian (宋健)
91. Song Hanliang (宋汉良)
92. Song Defu (宋德福)
93. Chi Haotian
94. Zhang Shou (张寿)
95. Zhang Zhongxian (张仲先)
96. Zhang Boxing (张勃兴)
97. Zhang Guoying (张帼英)
98. Lu Maozeng (陆懋曾)
99. Chen Yuying (陈玉英)
100. Chen Guangyi (陈光毅)
101. Chen Xitong
102. Chen Junsheng (陈俊生)
103. Chen Huiguang (陈辉光)
104. Chen Muhua (陈慕华)
105. Lin Ruo (林若)
106. Lin Liyun (林丽韫)
107. Luo Gan
108. Zhou Guangzhao (周光召)
109. Zhou Yibing (周衣冰)
110. Zhou Keyu (周克玉)
111. Zheng Tuobin (郑拓彬)
112. Fang Weizhong (房维中)
113. Zhao Dongwan (赵东宛)
114. Zhao Xianshun (赵先顺)
115. Zhao Zongnai (赵宗鼐)
116. Zhao Nanqi (赵南起)
117. Zhao Ziyang
118. Zhao Fulin (赵富林)
119. Hao Jianxiu (郝建秀)
120. Hu Ping (胡平)
121. Hu Qili
122. Hu Jintao
123. Hu Yaobang
124. Hou Jie (侯捷)
125. Hou Zongbin (侯宗宾)
126. Jiang Chunyun (姜春云)
127. Jiang Hongquan (姜洪泉)
128. Yao Yilin (姚依林)
129. He Jingzhi (贺敬之)
130. Qin Zhongda (秦仲达)
131. Qin Jiwei (秦基伟)
132. Raidi (热地)
133. Yuan Weimin
134. Nie Kuiju (聂奎聚)
135. Nie Bichu (聂璧初)
136. Jia Chunwang
137. Gu Xiulian (顾秀莲)
138. Gu Jinchi (顾金池)
139. Qian Zhengying (钱正英)
140. Qian Yongchang (钱永昌)
141. Qian Liren (钱李仁)
142. Qian Qichen
143. Tömür Dawamat (铁木尔·达瓦买提)
144. Ni Zhifu (倪志福)
145. Xu Huizi (徐惠滋)
146. Gao Di (高狄)
147. Gao Huanchang (高焕昌)
148. Guo Zhenqian (郭振乾)
149. Guo Chaoren (郭超人)
150. Lang Dazhong (朗大忠)
151. Qi Yuanjing (戚元靖)
152. Cui Naifu (崔乃夫)
153. Yan Mingfu (阎明复)
154. Liang Buting (梁步庭)
155. Liang Dongcai (梁栋材)
156. Wei Jianxing (尉健行)
157. Peng Chong (彭冲)
158. Dong Jichang (董继昌)
159. Jiang Xinxiong (蒋心雄)
160. Jiang Minkuan (蒋民宽)
161. Han Peixin (韩培信)
162. Cheng Weigao (程维高)
163. Fu Quanyou (傅全有)
164. Pu Chaozhu (普朝柱)
165. Wen Jiabao
166. Xie Fei (谢非)
167. Xie Xide (谢希德)
168. Lei Mingqiu (雷鸣球)
169. Bao Tong (鲍彤)
170. Cai Cheng
171. Liao Hui (廖晖)
172. Xiong Qingquan (熊清泉)
173. Saifuddin Azizi (赛福鼎·艾则孜)
174. Xue Ju (薛驹)
175. Wei Jinshan (魏金山)

== Chronology ==
1. 1st Plenary Session
  - Date: November 2, 1987
  - Location: Beijing
  - Significance: Zhao Ziyang was elected General Secretary. 18-member Politburo, 5-member Politburo Standing Committee and 5-member Secretariat were elected. Deng Xiaoping was re-elected Chairman of the Central Military Commission, and Chen Yun replaced him as Chairman of the Central Advisory Commission. Jiang Zemin was elected to the Politburo for the first time.
2. 2nd Plenary Session
  - Date: March 15–19, 1988
  - Location: Beijing
  - Significance: List of candidates for top State posts to be submitted to the 7th National People's Congress and the 7th National Committee of the Chinese People's Political Consultative Conference were adopted.
3. 3rd Plenary Session
  - Date: September 26–30, 1988
  - Location: Beijing
  - Significance: A program on the reform of prices and wages was taken, urging the State Council to put inflation under strict control.
4. 4th Plenary Session
  - Date: June 23–24, 1989
  - Location: Beijing
  - Significance: The meeting was held after the suppression of the 1989 Tiananmen Square protests and massacre. Li Peng delivered a report strongly criticizing Zhao Ziyang for his attitude during the "anti-party, anti-socialist turmoil": he was accused of "passive attitude toward the Four Cardinal Principles" and the "oppose bourgeois liberalization policy", and neglecting "party building, the spiritual civilization construction and ideological and political work". He was thus removed from his capacities of General Secretary, Politburo Standing Committee member, Politburo member and Central Military Commission first vice-chairman, with Jiang Zemin filling his posts as General Secretary and Politburo Standing Committee member. Building on Deng's view that "development is the absolute principle," Jiang Zemin and the third generation of leaders stated, "Development is the Party's top priority in governing and rejuvenating the country."
5. 5th Plenary Session
  - Date: November 6–9, 1989
  - Location: Beijing
  - Significance: Deng Xiaoping resigned as Chairman of the Central Military Commission, and Jiang Zemin took over the post. Yang Shangkun was appointed CMC first vice-chairman.
6. 6th Plenary Session
  - Date: March 9–12, 1990
  - Location: Beijing
  - Significance: In the official communique, the economic reform was exalted, but the growth of "bureaucracy, subjectivism, formalisticism, passivity and corruption" was denounced as well.
7. 7th Plenary Session
  - Date: December 25–30, 1990
  - Location: Beijing
  - Significance: A decision on the "Program of the National Economy and Society Development Decade" and guidelines for the 8th Five-Year Plan were adopted.
8. 8th Plenary Session
  - Date: November 25–29, 1991
  - Location: Beijing
  - Significance: A decision to enforce family household management of land was taken, in order to secure a bigger output of grain production.
9. 9th Plenary Session
  - Date: October 5–9, 1992
  - Location: Beijing
  - Significance: Preparations for the CCP's 14th National Congress were made. The critical assessment on Zhao Ziyang remained unchanged and so he was not listed as a candidate for the 14th Central Committee.
