= Hao Jianxiu =

Chinese politician

- 郝建秀
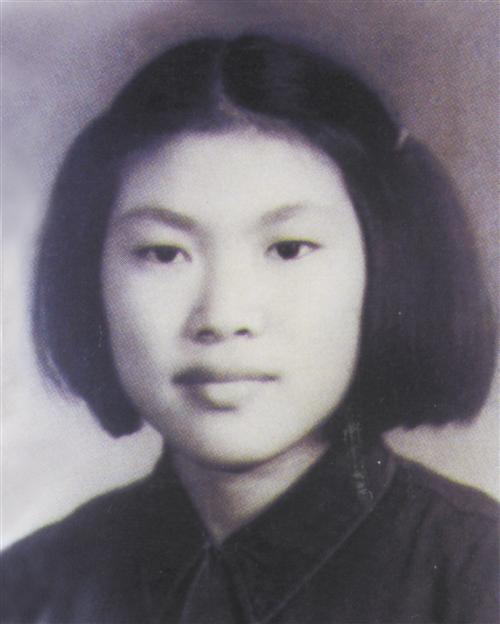
- Hao Jianxiu in the 1950s

Vice Chair of the State Planning Commission
- In office 1987–2001

Member of the Secretariat of the Chinese Communist Party
- In office 1982–1987

Minister of Textile Industry
- In office 1981–1982
- Preceded by: Qian Zhiguang
- Succeeded by: Wu Wenying

Personal details
- Born: November 1935 (age 90) Qingdao, Shandong, China
- Party: Chinese Communist Party
- Education: High School Affiliated to Renmin University of China; East China Textile Engineering Institute

Hao Jianxiu (Chinese: 郝建秀; Wade–Giles: Hao Chien-hsiu; born November 1935) is a retired Chinese politician. As an illiterate teenage textile worker, she was named a national model worker after inventing the "Hao Jianxiu Work Method".

She later graduated from university and was elevated to the upper echelon of Chinese politics, serving as Minister of Textile Industry in the 1980s. She then became a member of the Secretariat of the Chinese Communist Party, thus officially ranked as a "national leader", and served as vice chair of the State Planning Commission. In the People's Republic of China, she was extolled as a symbol of the ideal worker who improves production through innovation, and her political career benefited as a result.

== Early life and factory work ==
Hao Jianxiu was born in November 1935 into a working-class family in Qingdao, Shandong Province. Having had only one year's education in primary school, she began applying for jobs at local cotton mills at the age of nine, and eventually entered the state-owned No. 6 Cotton Mill in 1948, when she was 13.

She was said to be obsessively hard working, and devoted her energy to improving productivity and reducing waste at the factory. She took the initiative to observe and analyze the movements of the most productive workers, and propagate their techniques to others. She also studied the widespread problem of broken yarns, and discovered that breakage rate could be substantially reduced if the room was cleared of fluff. The method reportedly reduced content waste to 0.25% of previous levels.

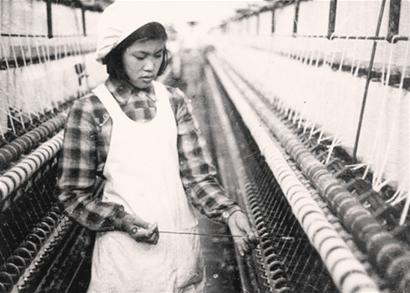
Hao Jianxiu working in a cotton mill

Her work attracted the attention of Chen Shaomin (陈少敏), chairwoman of the All-China Textile Workers' Trade Union, and Zhang Qinqiu, Vice Minister of Textile Industry. Her innovation was officially dubbed the "Hao Jianxiu (Fine-Yarn) Work Method" and it was instituted in textile mills nationwide. She was honoured as a national model worker in 1951, at the age of 16.

In 1954, Hao joined the Chinese Communist Party and was awarded a scholarship to attend the Intensive High School for Workers and Peasants of Renmin University of China in Beijing, graduating in 1958. She then entered East China Textile Engineering Institute (now Donghua University) in Shanghai to continue her studies. She returned to No. 6 Cotton Mill in Qingdao after graduating in 1962.

In 1957, she was sponsored by the All-China Federation of Trade Unions to travel to the Soviet Union. A pamphlet detailing her tour was produced by Worker's Press of China. Other publications and songs commemorated her early factory work, her recognition as a national labor model, and her attendance at National Day celebrations in Beijing.

In 1964, Hao was elected to the Central Committee of the Communist Youth League of China. A year later, she became deputy head of Qingdao's No. 8 Cotton Mill, where she continued to innovate. She replaced starch with algae in a glue used to attach cotton threads, saving a great deal of grains. She also improved the ventilation system to allow the factory to operate at a cooler temperature, thus enhancing the working environment for both the workers and the machinery.

== Political career ==
When the Cultural Revolution began in 1966, she became chairwoman of No. 8 Cotton Mill's Revolutionary Committee, effectively head of the mill. She then entered politics and quickly rose through the ranks. In five years she became a municipal government leader in 1971 when she was made vice-chair of the Qingdao Revolutionary Committee. In 1972, she was elected chairwoman of the Qingdao Federation of Trade Unions, and a year later, vice chairwoman of the Shandong Provincial Federation of Trade Unions. She was also selected to become head of the provincial Women's Federation in 1975.

Unlike many other cadres who rose quickly during the Cultural Revolution, Hao's career was not adversely affected by its end in 1976, and she continued to rise during Deng Xiaoping's reform era. In 1978, she was appointed Vice Minister of Textile Industry and Vice Chairwoman of the All-China Women's Federation, and promoted to full minister in 1981. She was one of the few elite women inducted to the Central Committee of the Chinese Communist Party, serving from 1977 until 1992. In 1982, she became an alternate member of the powerful CCP Central Secretariat, later promoted to full member, thus officially becoming one of China's "national leaders".

In 1987, she was made a vice-chairwoman of the State Planning Commission which is in charge of economic planning of the country. She served in that position until 2001, when she became a standing committee member of the 9th Chinese People's Political Consultative Conference (CPPCC). Two years later, she was elected vice-chairwoman of the 10th CPPCC (2003–2008).
