= Textile industry in China =

The textile industry in China is the largest in the world in both overall production and exports. As of 2022, China remained the world's largest exporter of clothing, accounting for 31.7% of global clothing exports, while Bangladesh rose to become the world's second-largest clothing exporter, overtaking Vietnam. China's textile exports, excluding finished garments, were valued at about $148 billion the same year. According to Women's Wear Daily, they account for more than 50 percent of the world's total overall production, exports, and retail. As of 2022, their textile and garment exports total up to around $316 billion and their retail up to $672 billion. China has been ranked as the world's largest manufacturer since 2010.

The industry began to grow at the turn of the 20th century, until the production of cotton yarn made up about 20% of China's total modern industrial output in that century. Stimulated by WWI, the industry expanded rapidly until the depression in the thirties. The industry continued to grow though more slowly until Second Sino-Japanese War, when the war destroyed many mills and their supply chains. They did not fully recover until the 1950s, at which point many of the major tycoons had moved their empires to Hong Kong to avoid persecution, while the rest of the industry was monopolized by the government. After Deng Xiaoping ascended to power, he identified these Hong Kong companies as models of technologically advanced capitalist companies and they were able to reconnect with those that had stayed in mainland China.

== Global competitiveness ==
In the early stages of the Chinese economy following the reform and opening up that begun in 1978–79, the low cost of labor was an important component of advantage in gaining export market share over other exporting countries.

Wages for blue collar workers have risen rapidly since that period, leading to predictions that textile products from China would no longer be competitive due to loss of low wage advantage. However, other advantages held by China over developing countries including "more efficient supply chain management, more modern infrastructure, and workers' higher productivity", have allowed Chinese textile producers to keep costs low relative to other producers. American trade statistics show from 2006 to 2014, the average unit price of imports from China slightly increased 0.7% from $1.45/square-meter-equivalent (SME) to $1.46/SME compared to imports from other countries, which increased by 7.9% from $1.97/SME to $2.13/SME.

The industry is undergoing a process of ongoing consolidation with a future outlook of a handful of manufacturing behemoths. Industry data from the first half of 2013 showed that production from manufacturers with revenue of at least approximately 10 million RMB grew by 13.3%. However, according to an article in Forbes in 2013, the industry is still highly fragmented with approximately 10,000 yarn and fabric makers.

Factories are also moving from rich coastal provinces to the poorer interior in search of lower wage labor. The Esquel Group, the largest cotton shirt maker in the world, had plans in 2015 for a 2-billion-yuan ($325 million) factory in Guilin, Guangxi.

A future development expected to boost domestic industry competitiveness is the end of trade protection for domestic cotton growers. The distortions created by the protected market for domestic cotton had made the going rate for cotton in China 45% more expensive than in Vietnam, a key competitor country.

=== The Trans-Pacific Partnership and the Chinese textile industry ===
The Trans-Pacific Partnership (TPP) includes 12 countries that make up 40% of the world's economies and is expected to affect the Chinese economy, including their textile and apparel market. With the United States joining and taking lead in the TPP in 2008 (withdrawn 23 January 2017), terms and conditions were created to get an advantage on China, a non-member of the Trans-Pacific Partnership. The trade deficit the US faces with China is significant; in 2015, the United States sold $116.2 billion in exported goods from China while importing $481.9 billion in goods from China. Under the TPP, China would have to pay a GATT tariff that members of the TPP would be excluded from, thus restricting China's ability to trade in the NAFTA region. Imports of textiles in the CBI, CAFTA, and the NAFTA region are currently subject to high import tariffs up to 10.1% for textiles and 26.8% for apparel. If the TPP were to be implemented, these tariffs would be reduced to zero for textiles and apparel products traded among member countries. Furthermore, with China being the top exporter of textiles and apparel in the world, the implementation is expected to result in a significant decline in China's apparel exports to the United States, Japan, and the NAFTA region, mainly Canada. The TPP would create a trade diversion effect that will deter these imports from China, due to high tariffs China will be subjected to, and encourage TPP members to trade and directly challenge China's exports. Japan's accession to the TPP is expected to have a substantial negative impact on China's textile and apparel exports. In a study conducted by Sheng Lu of the University of Rhode Island, he found that the demand from textiles from Vietnam and other Asian TPP members might create additional export opportunities for China, however with the TPP, the trade diversion effect caused by Japan is expected to affect China's exports to those regions.

=== Largest companies ===
Among the largest state-owned enterprises (SOE) are Shandong Demian Group and central SOE Sinomach, which entered textiles in 2017 after acquiring China Hi-Tech Group Corporation, another central SOE. The largest private companies are the Esquel Group and Luthai.

=== Foreign direct investment in textiles ===
Foreign direct investment (FDI) is an investment made by a company or individual based in one country in business interests in another country. FDI includes establishing business operations or acquiring assets in that second country. In 2005 the Chinese textile and garment industry received a total of $2.9 billion in FDI most of which came from Hong Kong, Macao, and Taiwan investors. Private firms in China seek foreign ownership, or FDI to mitigate challenges caused by the Chinese financial system. These challenges are in the form of capital allocations from the Chinese financial system that privilege the less efficient state-owned firms at the expense of more efficient private firms. These financial constraints faced by private firms in China are driving up labor-intensive FDI. Labor-intensive FDI includes markets with a work force behind it, such as the Chinese textile market. To secure FDI, private firms offer investors a stake in the company itself. Some estimates found that firms in the top 25 percentile of the financial constraint measure could have avoided losing 38.4% of their equity share to foreigners because they needed to obtain FDI. However, in a study that investigated the impact of FDI presence on the domestic and export sales of textile firms, researchers suggested that the presence of FDI generates positive and significant spillover effects on the domestic as well as export market sales of local firms in textile and manufacturing industries. Showing that government policies that restrict FDI and fail to improve the financial system can be counterproductive, but that policy-makers should encourage domestic and foreign-invested firms to increase the benefits of inward FDI. This suggests that FDI is important in alleviating the financial constraints of private firms.

== History ==
=== Establishment ===
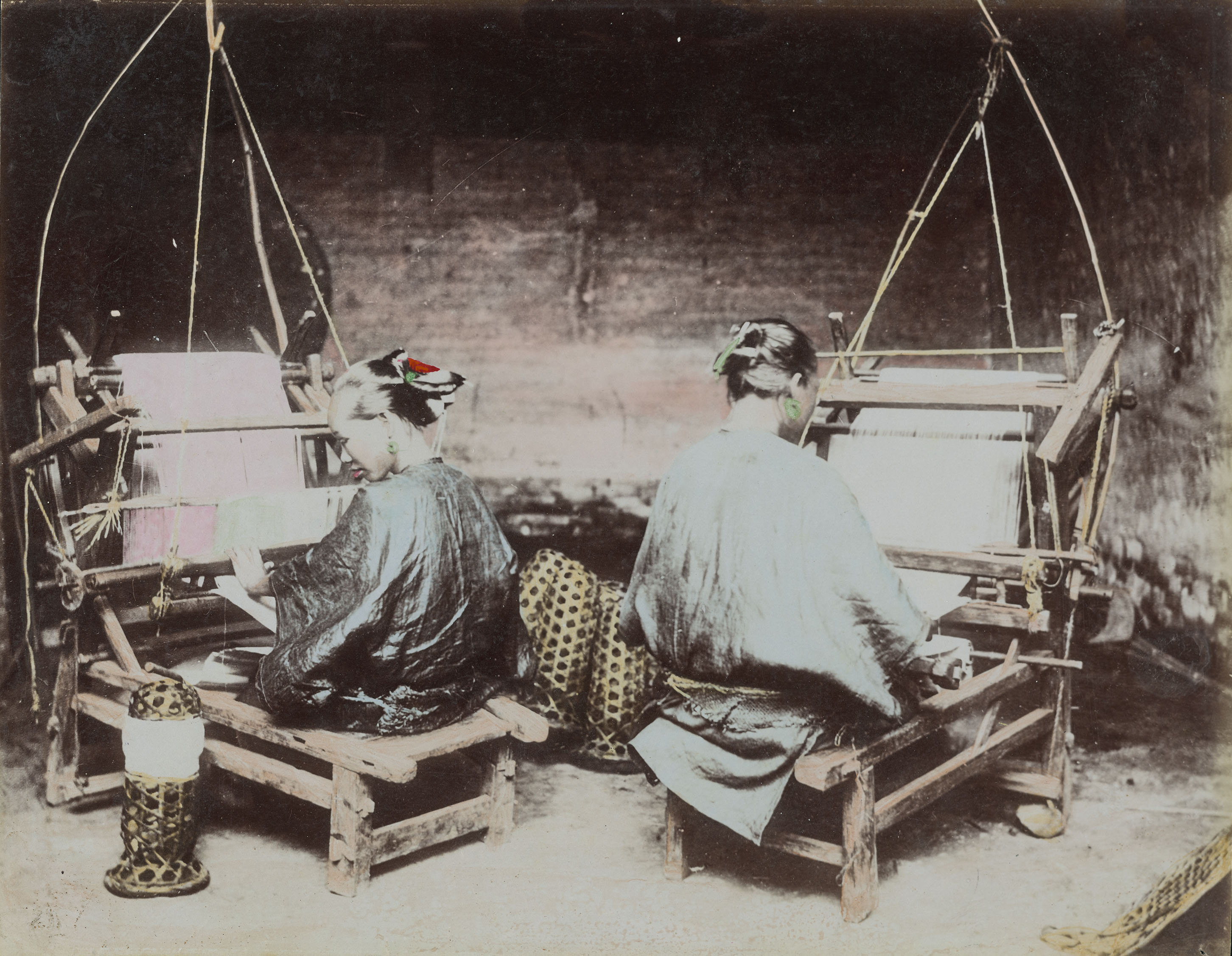
Two Chinese women making textiles, 19th century

In the late 1800s, China began importing foreign more foreign yarn and mechanized spinning mills increased. Foreign imports from British India of cotton yarn had created a large market for weavers in the countryside of northern China. Foreign interests noticed several key benefits of operating in China, including the vast market, availability of cheap labor and raw materials, longer work hours, and lower transport costs. The first foreign enterprises were established immediately after the Sino-Japanese War of 1904–05, within a few years of the first Chinese factories. Owing to the treaty ending the war, foreign entities were able to operate exempt from tariff duties and with fewer political restrictions than native companies. The British came first, but the Japanese arrived soon after.

In the late imperial era, all women (whether poor or elite) were expected to do textile work.

=== Rapid expansion ===
Since imports of Western manufactured goods stopped during World War I, the cotton industry in both China and Japan developed rapidly to fill the need in Asia. Initially, all of the machines and accessories were imported from Britain or America. This foreshadowed an industry trend of importing technology and exporting finished goods that describes most of the 20th century. However, in the 1920s, Japan became the main supplier of machines, and some began to be built in China as well, establishing the textile-machine-tools industry which would eventually grow enough in volume to supply neighboring countries as well.

=== Competition with Japanese companies ===
While the total capacity of the Chinese mills into the 1930s was greater than that of the Japanese, a third of the cotton yarn and half of the cotton goods produced in China were made by Japanese owned mills. Japanese mills had the advantage of better technology and more capital, while Chinese mills were limited due to management inefficiency, lack of organization, and financial weakness. In particular, the Japanese mills were able to survive the depression in the 1930s because they had stronger and more stable financial backing. Furthermore, in Shandong, which is still industrially important today, the Japanese had the advantage of the significant transportation and utilities infrastructure developed by the Germans when they used the city as a port for trade. When the Japanese arrived in 1914, they were able to use these resources and the local people's knowledge of machinery to very quickly establish seven modern spinning mills. Thanks to the electric power set up by the Germans, they were also able to implement electric powered weaving machines throughout the 1930s to significantly increase the production efficiency of mills.

In 1934, the National Economic Council of China established the Cotton Industry Commission, meant to improve the quality of Chinese raw cotton and to improve spinning, weaving, and dyeing techniques. However, due to the lack of capital and high outstanding debt of the Chinese mills, production costs were still high. In 1936, Chinese mills began to crop up inland instead of on the coast in an attempt to have more competitive costs and prices. The inland mills allowed them to sit closer to raw materials and the rural weaving markets.

In 1936, two-third of cloth in China were produced manually in households or small workshops.

=== Sino-Japanese War ===
In the Yan'an Soviet, the Communist Party encouraged women to spin and weave, both for purposes of supporting the economy with local cloth production and to increase women's involvement in public community life.

In July 1937, there were some 2.75 million spindles and 25,500 looms under Chinese ownership. There were 2.38 million spindles and 33,800 looms under Japanese control. Plans had been underway by both camps to expand dramatically, but most were stopped by the outbreak of the war. For comparison, the British controlled some 220,000 spindles and 4,000 looms.

When the fighting started, the Chinese government commissioned a group to help mill owners move their equipment inland. Areas such as Shantung, Honan, and Wuhan were able to move tons of equipment inland before the Japanese arrived, essentially clearing out existing mills and setting up new ones. However, around Shanghai, the fighting started so suddenly that only the equipment inside the International Settlement survived. Approximately 44% of the Chinese mills were located in and around Shanghai, and as a result, 60 Chinese-owned mills possessing about 70% of Chinese-run manufacturing equipment were lost. A large number of small weaving and dyeing workshops were also destroyed. When mills were not entirely destroyed, they were either operated by Japanese companies or transformed into hospitals or military headquarters. Most mills around Shanghai were too badly damaged to get fully running again quickly and were simply transformed to military use, but in the north, mills soon resumed work under the Japanese. However, these Japanese controlled mills were constantly harassed by guerrillas or revolting workers. The Japanese were further hindered by the exhaustion of raw materials, scarcity of labor, and marketing difficulties due to nationalistic conflicts. For example, when they evacuated their Qingdao mills for a few months in late 1937, the mills were in ruins when they returned. Soon the Japanese began to offer a system of "cooperative management" to the Chinese mill owners. Under this organization, there would be Japanese management and the Japanese would get 51% of the profits. Meanwhile, all repair costs would be borne by the Chinese. Most owners rejected this system.

==== The Rong family's Shenxin mills ====
The Rong brothers, Rong Zongjing and Rong Desheng, became the so-called "cotton and flour kings" owing to their empire of the ten Shenxin textile mills and sixteen Maoxin and Fuxin flour mills. By the mid-1930s, the Rongs held almost 20% of spindles in Chinese owned textile mills. However, in August 1937, they lost five of their seven Shanghai mills. Two were bombed and taken over by military forces, while the other three fell under Japanese control. The last two surviving mills were in the International Settlement, which was relatively protected from Japanese attacks as a zone of neutrality. While mills were encouraged to move inland and many did, the ones that stayed in Shanghai like the last two Shenxin mills registered as foreign entities for protection. They "leased" their mills to foreign owners and hired fake foreign managers so that they could fly a foreign flag. In fact, since the two mills were actually over capacity before the conflict, they operated more efficiently during this period, and one actually expanded and increased output. Even though the industry had taken a big hit, any mills that were not destroyed enjoyed decent profits due to high demand and low supply. This incentivized industrialists who were still in the area to rebuild mills, and they were able to bring the area back up to 40% of prewar production.

When the Pacific War erupted, the International Settlement came under heavy fire, and British or American registration made factories a target. The Japanese took over the Rongs' remaining two mills on the grounds that they were enemy property. However, since the Chinese were no longer Japan's biggest enemy, the military was ready to restore Chinese mills in Shanghai to industrialists willing to work with the occupation. The Japanese opposed returning the mills that they had restored and maintained, especially without a payment in return for all of the rebuilding they had to do. However, the Chinese manufacturers argued that they could more easily operate in the Chinese market and gain access to cotton produced in rural areas. One industrialist also appealed to a Japanese government connection of his who was a strong advocate for Pan-Asianism, and returning the mills to establish good relations was seen as a symbol of the Pan-Asian movement. In return, the industrialists were required to show public support for the Japanese, and many plant managers joined the control organizations of the puppet government.

However, Japan still controlled a significant amount of the raw cotton in China, so most of the cotton was either shipped to Japan or given to Japanese mills in China. Due to this lack of cotton, several of the Shenxin mills stopped production while others operated at a fraction of their capacity. The Rongs had to turn to the black market to continue profitable operation. They rented out their equipment to smaller rural workshops that could more easily evade control and tax. Ultimately, this willingness to work with and around the political powers of the time allowed the Rongs to survive, as well as the other prominent mill families of the time.

=== Recovering from war ===
China's textile industry only became dominated by the Chinese after the defeat of Japan in 1945, which gave China ownership of many well-equipped and efficient manufacturing units. However, Chinese management was limited in technical and managerial skill. Furthermore, because of the deterioration with lack of maintenance of many plants during the war, efficiency in 1947 varied between 65 and 80% of prewar standards. Combined with the loss of spindles due to the destruction of the war, output was only 40% of 1937 output. After Japan's retreat, the Chinese government took over 40 mills and incorporated them into the Chinese Textile Industries Corporation (CTIC), arguing that government management would get the mills running again most quickly. The government wanted the mills to clothe the army and to produce enough profit to reduce the government budget deficit. It also wanted to organize the mills to take over markets formerly supplied by Japan and to alleviate the clothing shortage in China and thus take over the domestic textile market. Ultimately this resulted in the government controlling 50% of China's textile industry. However, one of the actual reasons these mills were more efficient was because the Japanese had maintained the equipment in their mills well during the war. Yet even with easier access to capital, the government made no moves to expand its mills, indicating a lack of desire to invest but rather a desire to reap profits.

Private mills continued to try to grow, but major obstacles included high production costs due to inflation and scarcity of foreign exchange with which to buy raw cotton, machinery, and supplies. The war had wreaked havoc on the land, and the textile machine tool industry which had been prospering was largely lost. Finally, as the Chinese Communist Party rose to power, many mill owners packed their bags and moved their operations to Hong Kong to survive, allowing the next stage of development to take place in Hong Kong.

In the first ten years of the People's Republic of China, the Communist Party sought to develop textiles as an urban industry, rather than household production, viewing the latter as wasteful of raw material, wasteful of labor, and a legacy of China's semi-colonial experience. Beginning in 1960, the Communist Party increased its emphasis on the processing of cotton in urban factories rather than households.

During the Mao era, cotton mills were the single largest source of state revenues.

=== Reform and opening up ===
During China's reform and opening up, it abolished its Ministry of the Textile Industry in light of the sector's opening to market activity. The ministry was replaced by a non-governmental association, the Association of the Textile Industry. The association is typically headed by a retired deputy minister from the Ministry of Industry and Information Technology.
