= Yan Zheng =

Marine geochemist

- Education: Columbia University
- Scientific career
- Workplaces: Southern University of Science and Technology
- Thesis: The marine geochemistry of germanium, molybdenum and uranium : the sinks (1999)

Yan Zheng is a marine geochemist known for her research on metals in groundwater and private wells in Bangladesh, China, and the United States. She is an elected fellow of the Geological Society of America and the American Geophysical Union.

== Education and career ==
Zheng has a B.S. from the University of Science and Technology (1988). She then moved to Columbia University where she earned an M.A. (1993), an M.Phil (1994), and a Ph.D. (1999). Zheng began a position at Queens College, City University of New York in 1998 and was promoted to professor in 2006, and served as the director of the School of Earth and Environmental Sciences from 2012 until 2016. In 2014, she returned to China to hold the position of chair professor at Peking University's Institute of Water Sciences. In 2016 she moved to Southern University of Science and Technology where she is a chair professor.

From 2009 until 2011, she was a specialist at UNICEF Bangladesh working in their water and environmental sanitation group.

== Research ==
Zheng's early research examined uranium and molybdenum in marine sediments, and used molybdenum concentrations to investigate the Bølling–Allerød warming that occurred 15 thousand years ago. In Bangladesh, Zheng has examined the spatial extent of arsenic in wells, and defined the conditions that lead to the presence of dissolved arsenic in groundwater in the region. In the United States, she has tracked arsenic in groundwater in Maine and considered how to best mitigate the risks associated with arsenic in drinking water. Zheng has worked with others to develop a colorimetric assay to detect arsenic which facilitates testing for arsenic in groundwater. Based on her research, she advocates for the need to test individual drinking-water wells for these metals.

== Selected publications ==
- Zheng, Y.; van Geen, A.; Stute, M.; Dhar, R.; Mo, Z.; Cheng, Z.; Horneman, A.; Gavrieli, I.; Simpson, H. J.; Versteeg, R.; Steckler, M.; Grazioli-Venier, A.; Goodbred, S.; Shahnewaz, M.; Shamsudduha, M.; Hoque, M. A.; Ahmed, K. M. (15 November 2005). "Geochemical and hydrogeological contrasts between shallow and deeper aquifers in two villages of Araihazar, Bangladesh: Implications for deeper aquifers as drinking water sources". Geochimica et Cosmochimica Acta. 69 (22): 5203–5218. Bibcode:2005GeCoA..69.5203Z. doi:10.1016/j.gca.2005.06.001. ISSN 0016-7037.
- Zheng, Y.; Stute, M.; van Geen, A.; Gavrieli, I.; Dhar, R.; Simpson, H. J.; Schlosser, P.; Ahmed, K. M. (1 February 2004). "Redox control of arsenic mobilization in Bangladesh groundwater". Applied Geochemistry. 19 (2): 201–214. Bibcode:2004ApGC...19..201Z. doi:10.1016/j.apgeochem.2003.09.007. ISSN 0883-2927.
- Zheng, Yan; Anderson, Robert F.; van Geen, Alexander; Kuwabara, James (15 December 2000). "Authigenic molybdenum formation in marine sediments: a link to pore water sulfide in the Santa Barbara Basin". Geochimica et Cosmochimica Acta. 64 (24): 4165–4178. Bibcode:2000GeCoA..64.4165Z. doi:10.1016/S0016-7037(00)00495-6. ISSN 0016-7037.

== Awards and honors ==
Zheng became an elected fellow of the Geological Society of America in 2010, and an elected fellow of the American Geophysical Union in 2021. In 2021, she gave the Li Siguang Lecture at the University of Birmingham.
