= Ma Ming =

Chinese politician

- 马明

Vice Chairman of the Inner Mongolia Autonomous Region Committee of the Chinese People's Political Consultative Conference
- In office February 2018 – December 2019
- Chairman: Li Jia

Vice Chairman of Inner Mongolia
- In office June 2012 – February 2018
- Chairman: Bagatur→Bu Xiaolin

Head of the Public Security Department of Inner Mongolia Autonomous Region
- In office June 2012 – February 2018
- Preceded by: Zhao Liping
- Succeeded by: Heng Xiaofan

Vice Governor of Jilin
- In office January 2012 – June 2012
- Governor: Wang Rulin

Personal details
- Born: October 1957 (age 68–69) Liaozhong County, Liaoning, China
- Party: Chinese Communist Party (1984-2020; expelled)
- Education: Jilin University of Finance and Economics; Jilin University

Chinese name
- Traditional Chinese: 馬明
- Simplified Chinese: 马明
Transcriptions
Standard Mandarin
- Hanyu Pinyin: Mǎ Míng

Ma Ming (Chinese: 马明; born October 1957) is a former Chinese politician who spent his career in northeast China's Jilin province and the nearby Inner Mongolia Autonomous Region. He was investigated by the Central Commission for Discipline Inspection in December 2019. Previously he served as vice chairman of the Inner Mongolia Autonomous Region Committee of the Chinese People's Political Consultative Conference.

== Early life and education ==
Ma was born in Liaozhong County, Liaoning in October 1957. From July 1975 to August 1978, he was a sent down youth in Mishazi Commune of Dehui County, Jilin Province. After the resumption of college entrance examination, he was accepted to Jilin College of Finance and Trade (now Jilin University of Finance and Economics), where he graduated in August 1982.

== Career ==
After graduation, he was assigned to Jilin Institute of Financial Science, becoming its vice president in March 1987. From June 1994 to August 1995, he was Chinese Communist Party Deputy Committee Secretary of Changling County. He was deputy head of Jilin Provincial State Owned Assets Administration (1995–1996), Jilin Provincial Department of Finance (1996–1998), and Jilin Provincial Department of Foreign Trade and Economic Cooperation (1998–2000). He was vice mayor of Songyuan County in May 2000, and held that office until December 2002. In December 2003 he was promoted to become deputy head of Jilin Provincial Department of Finance, a position he held until January 2006. In January 2006, he was appointed head of the Jilin Provincial Department of Commerce, a position he remained in until January 2008, when he was transferred to Liaoyuan and appointed Chinese Communist Party Committee Secretary. He became the CCP Committee Secretary and head of Jilin Provincial Public Security Department in May 2011, and served until June 2012. He concurrently served as vice governor of Jilin from January 2012 to June 2012.

In June 2012, he was transferred to Hohhot, capital of Inner Mongolia Autonomous Region, as vice chairman of the People's Government of Inner Mongolia Autonomous Region, CCP Committee Secretary and head of the Public Security Department of Inner Mongolia Autonomous Region, and deputy secretary of the Politics and Law Commission of Inner Mongolia Autonomous Region. In February 2018, he was appointed vice chairman of the Inner Mongolia Autonomous Region Committee of the Chinese People's Political Consultative Conference.

== Downfall ==
On December 1, 2019, Ma was placed under investigation for serious violations of laws and regulations by the Central Commission for Discipline Inspection (CCDI), the Chinese Communist Party's internal disciplinary body, and the National Supervisory Commission, the highest anti-corruption agency of China. On November 15, 2020, he was expelled from the party and removed from public office. Prosecutors signed an arrest order for him on December 1.

On January 12, 2021, he has been indicted on suspicion of accepting bribes.

Government offices
Preceded by Zhao Liping	Head of the Public Security Department of Inner Mongolia Autonomous Region; 2012–2019	Succeeded by Heng Xiaofan (衡晓帆)
