= Liu Zhijian =

People's Liberation Army lieutenant general from Hunan Province, China

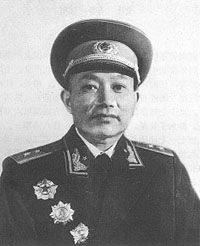
Liu Zhijian

Liu Zhijian (Chinese: 刘志坚; 1912 – March 11, 2006) was a People's Liberation Army lieutenant general. He was born in Pingjiang County, Hunan Province. He joined the Chinese Communist Party in 1931. He was a member of the Eighth Route Army during the Second Sino-Japanese War. He was captured in southern Hebei by Japanese forces, but later rescued. During the Chinese Civil War, he was active in the region of Shanxi, Hebei, Shandong and Henan Provinces. During the Cultural Revolution, he opposed Jiang Qing. He was later sent by Deng Xiaoping to Kunming for planning the Sino-Vietnamese War along with Yang Dezhi.

He was an alternate member of the Central Committee of the Chinese Communist Party from August 1977 until he became a full member in September 1982, serving until September 1985. He was a member of the Central Advisory Commission from September 1985 to October 1992.
