= Xiao Han (politician) =

Chinese politician (1926–2019)

Xiao Han (Chinese: 肖寒; December 1926 – 23 October 2019) was a Chinese politician and energy industry executive. He served as Minister of Coal Industry (1977–1980), Vice Director of the State Economic and Trade Commission, and Chairman of China Huaneng Group. He helped found the state-owned coal company Shenhua Group in 1995 and served as its first chairman until his retirement in 1998.

== Life and career ==
Xiao Han was born in December 1926 in Guantao County, Hebei, Republic of China. He received a high school education. He joined the Chinese Communist Party (CCP) in May 1940 and worked for many years in Hebei, serving as Deputy Party Secretary of Handan, Head of Handan Steel, CCP Committee Secretary of Fengfeng Mining District, and CCP Committee Secretary of Kailuan Coal Mine.

In October 1975, Xiao was appointed Vice Minister of the Ministry of Coal Industry. He was promoted to Minister in July 1977. He was appointed Vice Director of the State Economic and Trade Commission in February 1980, serving until May 1982. He was an alternate member of the 11th Central Committee of the Chinese Communist Party and a full member of the 12th Central Committee.

In March 1983, Xiao was put in charge of planning and developing a coal production base in Shanxi province. He subsequently served as Chairman of Huaneng Fine Coal Company, a division of the state-owned power company China Huaneng Group, and was later promoted to Chairman of Huaneng Group.

In 1995, Xiao was appointed Chairman of the newly created state-owned coal company Shenhua Group, which originated from Huaneng Fine Coal Company. Han Ying, a former Vice Minister of Coal Industry, was appointed president. The duo worked for three years to get Shenhua up and running, while many Chinese state-owned enterprises were suffering from losses or facing bankruptcy. Xiao retired in 1998 and was replaced by Ye Qing at Shenhua.

== Personal life ==
Xiao had eight children. Two of his sons, Han Jianping (韩建平), aged 20, and Han Yuping (韩玉平), aged 17, worked at Kailuan Coal Mine near Tangshan and died in the 1976 Tangshan earthquake.

Xiao died in Beijing on 23 October 2019, aged 92.
