= Shi Yuxiao =

Chinese general

- 史玉孝

Political Commissioner of the Guangzhou Military Region
- In office November 1992 – August 1998
- Preceded by: Zhang Zhongxian
- Succeeded by: Liu Shutian

Political Commissioner of the Nanjing Military Region
- In office April 1990 – November 1992
- Preceded by: Fu Kuiqing
- Succeeded by: Liu Anyuan

Personal details
- Born: 11 April 1933 Baoji County, Shaanxi, China
- Died: 12 February 2005 (aged 71) Guangzhou, Guangdong, China
- Party: Chinese Communist Party
- Education: PLA Political College; Central Party School of the Chinese Communist Party

Military service
- Allegiance: People's Republic of China
- Branch/service: People's Volunteer Army; People's Liberation Army Ground Force
- Years of service: 1949–1998
- Rank: General
- Battles/wars: Chinese Civil War; Korean War; Sino-Vietnamese War

Shi Yuxiao (Chinese: 史玉孝; pinyin: Shǐ Yùxiào; 11 April 1933 – 12 February 2005) was a general (shangjiang) of the People's Liberation Army (PLA). He was a member of the 13th and 14th Central Committee of the Chinese Communist Party. He was a member of the Standing Committee of the 9th National People's Congress and a delegate to the 10th National People's Congress.

== Biography ==
Shi was born Shi Yuxiao (史瑜孝) in the town of Zhouyuan, Baoji County (now Baoji), Shaanxi, on 11 April 1933.

He enlisted in the People's Liberation Army (PLA) in July 1949, and joined the Chinese Communist Party (CCP) in November 1953. During the Chinese Civil War, he served in the First Field Army and engaged in the Battle of Lanzhou. In February 1952, he went to the Korean battlefield to participate in the Korean War and returned to China in September 1958. In 1984, he was political commissioner of the 1st Group Army, for which he led the troops to control 28 enemy strongholds, annihilated more than 5,200 enemy people, destroyed 128 artillery, 65 military vehicles, and seized 112 guns of various types. In June 1985, he became deputy political commissioner of the Nanjing Military Region, rising to political commissioner in April 1990. During his term in office, he led the troops to impose martial law in Beijing during the 1989 Tiananmen Square protests and massacre. He became political commissioner of the Guangzhou Military Region in November 1992, and served until August 1998. In March 1998, he was made vice chairperson of the National People's Congress Financial and Economic Affairs Committee. In 1998, the Yangtze River flood, he led the troops to participate in the flood relief operations.

On 12 February 2005, he died of an illness in Guangzhou, Guangdong, at the age of 71.

He was promoted to the rank of lieutenant general (zhongjiang) in September 1988 and general (shangjiang) in May 1994.

Military offices
Preceded by Fu Kuiqing	Political Commissioner of the Nanjing Military Region; 1990–1992	Succeeded by Liu Anyuan
Preceded by Zhang Zhongxian	Political Commissioner of the Guangzhou Military Region; 1992–1998	Succeeded by Liu Shutian
