= Lu Gongxun =

Chinese politician (1933–2023)

Lu Gongxun (Chinese: 卢功勋; November 1933 – 28 February 2023) was a Chinese politician.

Lu was born in Shuozhou, Shanxi. He was a delegate to the 8th National People's Congress and 9th National People's Congress.

Lu died on 28 February 2023, at the age of 89.

Preceded by Wang Tingdong	Chairman of the Shanxi People's Congress; 1993–2003	Succeeded by Tian Chengping
