= 12th Central Committee of the Chinese Communist Party =

In session, 1982–1987

The 12th Central Committee of the Chinese Communist Party was in session from September 1982 to November 1987. It held seven plenary sessions. It was succeeded by the 13th Central Committee. It elected the 12th Politburo of the Chinese Communist Party in 1982.

== List of members ==
The following is in stroke order of surnames:

1. Yu Mingtao
2. Yu Hong'en
3. Wan Da
4. Wan Li
5. Wan Haifeng
6. Ma Wenrui
7. Ma Xingyuan
8. Xi Zhongxun
9. Wang Fang
10. Wang Meng
11. Wang Zhen
12. Wang Bingqian
13. Wang Hanbin
14. Wang Guangzhong
15. Wang Guangyu
16. Wang Zhaoguo
17. Wang Quanguo
18. Wang Renzhong
19. Wang Kewen
20. Wang Chenghan
21. Wang Enmao
22. Wang Chonglun
23. Wang Chaowen
24. Wang Heshou
25. Wei Guoqing
26. You Taizhong
27. Mao Zhiyong
28. Ulanhu
29. Fang Yi
30. Basang
31. Deng Liqun
32. Deng Xiaoping
33. Deng Yingchao
34. Deng Jiaxian
35. Buhe
36. Ye Fei
37. Ye Jianying
38. Tian Jiyun
39. Bai Dongcai
40. Ismail Amat (司马义·艾买提)
41. Xing Yanzi
42. Lü Peijian
43. Zhu Yunqian
44. Zhu Guangya
45. Zhu Muzhi
46. Qiao Shi
47. Qiao Xiaoguang
48. Wu Jinghua
49. Ren Zhongyi
50. Hua Guofeng
51. Xiang Shouzhi
52. Liu Zhen
53. Liu Zhengwei
54. Liu Huaqing
55. Liu Zhijian
56. Liu Fuzhi
57. Liu Zhenhua
58. Jiang Zemin
59. Jiang Yonghui
60. Chi Biqing
61. An Pingsheng
62. Xu Jiatun
63. Sun Daguang
64. Yin Fatang
65. Yan Dongsheng (严东生）
66. Su Gang
67. Su Yiran
68. Li Rui
69. Li Peng
70. Li Li'an
71. Li Ziqi
72. Li Ligong
73. Li Dongzhi
74. Li Xiannian
75. Li Qiming
76. Li Xuezhi
77. Li Menghua
78. Li Xu'e
79. Li Senmao
80. Li Ruihuan
81. Li Ximing
82. Li Xifu
83. Li Desheng
84. Li Yaowen
85. Yang Bo
86. Yang Yong
87. Yang Di
88. Yang Chengwu
89. Yang Rudai
90. Yang Yichen
91. Yang Shangkun
92. Yang Dezhi
93. Yang Jingren
94. Yang Dezhong
95. Xiao Hua
96. Xiao Han
97. Xiao Quanfu
98. Wu Quanqing
99. Wu Xueqian
100. He Kang
101. He Dongchang
102. Yu Qiuli
103. Gu Mu
104. Shen Tu
105. Shen Yinluo
106. Song Ping
107. Song Renqiong
108. Zhang Shou
109. Zhang Zhen
110. Zhang Tingfa
111. Zhang Zaiwang
112. Zhang Jingfu
113. Zhang Aiping
114. Zhang Zhixiu
115. Zhang Shuguang
116. Chen Yun
117. Chen Bin
118. Chen Lei
119. Chen Renhong
120. Chen Pixian
121. Chen Weida
122. Chen Xitong
123. Chen Guodong
124. Chen Fuhan
125. Chen Muhua
126. Chen Puru
127. Lin Ruo
128. Lin Hujia
129. Lin Liyun
130. Luo Qingchang
131. Zhou Hui
132. Zhou Zijian
133. Zhou Shizhong
134. Zhou Jiannan
135. Zheng Sansheng
136. Zheng Tuobin
137. Xiang Nan
138. Zhao Shouyi
139. Zhao Xingyuan
140. Zhao Zhijian
141. Zhao Cangbi
142. Zhao Nanqi
143. Zhao Haifeng
144. Zhao Ziyang
145. Hao Jianxiu
146. Hu Hong
147. Hu Sheng
148. Hu Lijiao
149. Hu Qiaomu
150. Hu Qili
151. Hu Yaobang
152. Liu Lin
153. Rao Xingli
154. Hong Xuezhi
155. Yao Guang
156. Yao Yilin
157. He Jinheng
158. He Jingzhi
159. Qin Chuan
160. Qin Zhongda
161. Qin Jiwei
162. Yuan Baohua
163. Nie Rongzhen
164. Mo Wenxiang
165. Raidi
166. Gu Xiulian
167. Qian Zhengying
168. Qian Yongchang
169. Tie Ying
170. Tömür Dawamat
171. Ni Zhifu
172. Xu Shaofu
173. Xu Xiangqian
174. Yin Yuan
175. Gao Yangwen (高扬文)
176. Guo Liwen (郭力文)
177. Tang Ke (唐克)
178. Huang Hua (黄华)
179. Huang Zhizhen (黄知真)
180. Huang Xinting (黄新廷)
181. Cui Naifu (崔乃夫)
182. Cui Yueli (崔月犁)
183. Kang Shi'en (康世恩)
184. Kang Keqing (康克清)
185. Zhang Ze (章泽)
186. Liang Biye (梁必业)
187. Liang Lingguang (梁灵光)
188. Liang Buting (梁步庭)
189. Peng Chong (彭冲)
190. Peng Zhen
191. Jiang Nanxiang (蒋南翔)
192. Han Xianchu
193. Han Peixin (韩培信)
194. Tan Yingji (覃应机)
195. Fu Kuiqing (傅奎清)
196. Jiao Linyi (焦林义)
197. Lu Dadong (鲁大东)
198. Xie Xide (谢希德)
199. Xie Zhenhua (谢振华)
200. Jiang Xiaochu (强晓初)
201. Xie Feng (解峰)
202. Liao Hansheng (廖汉生)
203. Liao Chengzhi (廖承志)
204. Saifuddin Azizi (赛福鼎·艾则孜)
205. Tan Youlin (谭友林)
206. Tan Qilong (谭启龙)
207. Tan Shanhe (谭善和)
208. Xue Ju (薛驹)
209. Mu Qing (穆青)
210. Dai Suli (戴苏理)

== Chronology ==
1. 1st Plenary Session
  - Date: September 12–13, 1982
  - Location: Beijing
  - Significance: Hu Yaobang was elected General Secretary, with Zhao Ziyang as his No. 2 (though he was listed fourth among top leaders). 28-member Politburo, 6-member Politburo Standing Committee and 5-member Secretariat were elected. The Central Advisory Commission was established. Deng Xiaoping was elected chairman of both the Central Military Commission and the Central Advisory Commission. In his closing speech, he talked about the retirement of elder leaders.
2. 2nd Plenary Session
  - Date: October 11–12, 1983
  - Location: Beijing
  - Significance: A Decision of the CCP Central Committee on the Rectification of Party Organizations was adopted in order to purge the Party from consequences of the Cultural Revolution. Around this time, the Anti-Spiritual Pollution Campaign was launched under Chen Yun's care. This was one of the few post-Mao meetings focused on ideological issues.
3. 3rd Plenary Session
  - Date: October 20, 1984
  - Location: Beijing
  - Significance: A Decision of the CCP Central Committee on Economic Reform was adopted, fostering the new economic line pursued by Deng Xiaoping's leadership. A CCP National Conference on it was convened.
4. 4th Plenary Session
  - Date: September 16, 1985
  - Location: Beijing
  - Significance: Recommendations for the 7th Five-Year Plan were adopted to be submitted to the Party's National Conference on September 20, and then to the National People's Congress with the goal of adapting national economy to the reform. Party veterans Ye Jianying and Huang Kecheng retired.
5. 5th Plenary Session
  - Date: September 24, 1985
  - Location: Beijing
  - Significance: Meeting held after the September 20 National Conference. The leadership bodies of the Central Committee, the Central Advisory Commission and the Central Commission for Discipline Inspection were renewed. Li Peng entered the Politburo and the Secretariat.
6. 6th Plenary Session
  - Date: September 28, 1986
  - Location: Beijing
  - Significance: A Resolution of the CCP Central Committee on the Building of the Socialist Spiritual Culture. The decision to convene the Party's 13th National Congress was taken.
7. 7th Plenary Session
  - Date: September 28, 1987
  - Location: Beijing
  - Significance: Preparations for the Party's 13th National Congress were made. A plan for administration reform was adopted. Hu Yaobang's resignation was confirmed and Zhao Ziyang was elected General Secretary.
