= Song Wenhan =

- 宋文汉

Chief of Staff of the Guangzhou Military Region
- In office November 1996 – January 2002
- Commander: Tao Bojun
- Preceded by: Gong Gucheng
- Succeeded by: Ye Aiqun

Personal details
- Born: June 1939 Xiangxiang County, Hunan, China
- Died: 30 March 2024 (aged 84) Guangzhou, Guangdong, China
- Party: Chinese Communist Party

Military service
- Allegiance: People's Republic of China
- Branch/service: People's Liberation Army Ground Force
- Years of service: 1958–2008
- Rank: Lieutenant general
- Commands: Guangzhou Military Region

Chinese name
- Simplified Chinese: 宋文汉
- Traditional Chinese: 宋文漢
Transcriptions
Standard Mandarin
- Hanyu Pinyin: Sòng Wénhàn

Song Wenhan (Chinese: 宋文汉; June 1939 – 30 March 2024) was a lieutenant general in the People's Liberation Army of China who served as chief of staff of the Guangzhou Military Region from 1996 to 2002. He was promoted to the rank of major general (shaojiang) in July 1990 and lieutenant general (zhongjiang) in July 1998. He was a delegate to the 9th National People's Congress and a member of the 10th National Committee of the Chinese People's Political Consultative Conference.

== Biography ==
Song was born in the town of Jinshi, in Xiangxiang County (now Xiangxiang), Hunan, in June 1939.

He enlisted in the People's Liberation Army (PLA) in 1958, and joined the Chinese Communist Party (CCP) in 1960. In May 1983, he became deputy chief of staff of the 41st Army, rising to chief of staff in August 1985. He was appointed chief of staff of the 42nd Army in July 1988. He served as deputy chief of staff of the Guangzhou Military Region in June 1990, and was promoted to the chief of staff position in November 1996. In January 2002, he was commissioned as deputy commander of the Guangzhou Military Region, but having held the position for only six months. He retired in July 2008.

On 30 March 2024, he died in Guangzhou, Guangdong, at the age of 84.

Military offices
Preceded by Gong Gucheng	Chief of Staff of the Guangzhou Military Region; 1996–2002	Succeeded by Ye Aiqun
