= Gao Xingmin =

- 高兴民

Secretary of the Discipline Inspection Commission of the People's Liberation Army Air Force
- In office December 1990 – December 1993
- Preceded by: Xu Lefu
- Succeeded by: Yang Yingchang

Political Commissar of the PLA Shenyang Military Region Air Force
- In office May 1983 – May 1985
- Commander: Cao Shuangming
- Preceded by: Zhao Lantian
- Succeeded by: Liu Cunxin

Director of the Political Department of the PLA Fuzhou Military District Air Force
- In office September 1977 – May 1983
- Preceded by: Huang Feng
- Succeeded by: Ma Shaojun (马绍君)

Personal details
- Born: 22 February 1928 Luannan County, Hebei, China
- Died: 20 December 2021 (aged 93) Beijing, China
- Party: Chinese Communist Party
- Education: PLA National Defence University

Military service
- Allegiance: People's Republic of China
- Branch/service: People's Liberation Army Air Force
- Years of service: 1942–1992
- Rank: Lieutenant general
- Battles/wars: Second Sino-Japanese War; Chinese Civil War
- Awards: Order of Liberation (3rd Class); Order of Independence and Freedom (3rd Class)

Chinese name
- Simplified Chinese: 高兴民
- Traditional Chinese: 高興民
Transcriptions
Standard Mandarin
- Hanyu Pinyin: Gāo Xīngmín

Gao Shaoming
- Simplified Chinese: 高绍明
- Traditional Chinese: 高紹明
Transcriptions
Standard Mandarin
- Hanyu Pinyin: Gāo Shàomíng

Gao Xingmin (Chinese: 高兴民; 22 February 1928 – 20 December 2021) was a lieutenant general in the People's Liberation Army of China who served as director of the Political Department of the PLA Fuzhou Military District Air Force from 1977 to 1983, political commissar of the PLA Shenyang Military Region Air Force from 1983 to 1985, and secretary of the Discipline Inspection Commission of the People's Liberation Army Air Force from 1990 to 1993.

Gao was a representative of the 13th and 14th National Congress of the Chinese Communist Party. He was a delegate to the 6th National People's Congress. He was a member the Standing Committee of the 8th Chinese People's Political Consultative Conference.

== Biography ==
Gao was born Gao Shaoming (高绍明) into a peasant family, in the town of Angezhuang, Luannan County, Hebei, on 22 February 1928. He was the fourth of five children.

Gao enlisted in the Eighth Route Army in 1942, and joined the Chinese Communist Party (CCP) in June 1943. During the Second Sino-Japanese War, he served in the war and engaged in the Battle of Ji County (now Tianjin), Battle of Yutian, Battle of Bao'an. He was present at the Battle of Xingrenbao and Battle of Guandizhen during the Chinese Civil War.

After the establishment of the Communist State in 1949, Gao once served as director of the Security Bureau of the Political Department of the People's Liberation Army Air Force. In 1977, he graduated from the PLA Military and Political University (now PLA National Defence University). In September 1977, he was appointed as director of the Political Department of the PLA Fuzhou Military District Air Force, he remained in that position until May 1983, when he was transferred to northeast China and commissioned as political commissar of the PLA Shenyang Military Region Air Force. He was promoted to the rank of lieutenant general (zhongjiang) in 1988. In December 1990, he was assigned deputy political commissar of the People's Liberation Army Air Force and secretary of its Discipline Inspection Commission. He retired in 1992.

On 20 December 2021, Gao died in Beijing, at the age of 93.

Military offices
Preceded by Huang Feng	Director of the Political Department of the PLA Fuzhou Military District Air Force; 1977–1983	Succeeded by Ma Shaojun (马绍君)
Preceded by Zhao Lantian	Political Commissar of the PLA Shenyang Military Region Air Force; 1983–1985	Succeeded by Liu Cunxin
Preceded by Xu Lefu	Secretary of the Discipline Inspection Commission of the People's Liberation Army Air Force; 1990–1993	Succeeded by Yang Yingchang
