= Chen Xianhua =

Chinese military officer (1937–2024)

- 陈显华

Deputy Commander of the Chengdu Military Region
- In office January 1996 – July 2003
- Commander: Liao Xilong; Wang Jianmin

Chief of Staff of the Chengdu Military Region
- In office November 1992 – January 1996
- Commander: Li Jiulong; Wei Fulin
- Preceded by: Tao Bojun
- Succeeded by: Zhu Qi

Chief of Staff of the Guangzhou Military Region
- In office April 1990 – November 1992
- Commander: Zhu Dunfa
- Preceded by: Li Xilin
- Succeeded by: Tao Bojun

Personal details
- Born: February 1937 Yucheng County, Shandong, China
- Died: 12 September 2024 (aged 87) Guangzhou, Guangdong, China
- Party: Chinese Communist Party

Military service
- Allegiance: People's Republic of China
- Branch/service: People's Liberation Army Ground Force
- Years of service: 1954–2003
- Rank: Lieutenant general
- Battles/wars: Korean War; Sino-Vietnamese War

Chinese name
- Simplified Chinese: 陈显华
- Traditional Chinese: 陳顯華
Transcriptions
Standard Mandarin
- Hanyu Pinyin: Chén Xiǎnhuá

Chen Xianhua (Chinese: 陈显华; February 1937 – 12 September 2024) was a lieutenant general in the People's Liberation Army of China. He was a delegate to the 7th, 8th and 9th National People's Congress.

== Biography ==
Chen was born in Yucheng County (now Yucheng), Shandong, in February 1937. He enlisted in the People's Liberation Army (PLA) in July 1954, and joined the Chinese Communist Party (CCP) in July 1956. He participated in the Korean War and the Sino-Vietnamese War.

In April 1990, he was appointed chief of staff of the Guangzhou Military Region, he remained in that position until November 1992, when he was transferred to the Chengdu Military Region and appointed chief of staff. In April 1996, he became deputy commander of the military region, and retired in July 2003.

He was promoted to the rank of major general (shaojiang) in September 1988 and lieutenant general (zhongjiang) in July 1993.

On 12 September 2024, Chen died of an illness in Guangzhou, Guangdong, at the age of 87.

Military offices
Preceded by Li Xilin	Chief of Staff of the Guangzhou Military Region; 1990–1992	Succeeded by Tao Bojun
Preceded by Tao Bojun	Chief of Staff of the Chengdu Military Region; 1992–1996	Succeeded by Zhu Qi
