= Li Xilin =

Chinese general (1930–2024)

- 李希林

Commander of the Guangzhou Military Region
- In office October 1992 – January 1996
- Preceded by: Zhu Dunfa
- Succeeded by: Tao Bojun

Chief of Staff of the Guangzhou Military Region
- In office June 1985 – April 1990
- Commander: You Taizhong; Zhang Wannian; Liu Cunzhi (acting); Zhu Dunfa
- Preceded by: Liu Cunzhi
- Succeeded by: Chen Xianhua

Personal details
- Born: Li Ruilin; 2 October 1930 Ji County, Hebei, Republic of China
- Died: 2 April 2024 (aged 93) Guangzhou, Guangdong, China
- Party: Chinese Communist Party
- Education: PLA Military Academy

Military service
- Allegiance: People's Republic of China
- Branch/service: People's Liberation Army Ground Force
- Years of service: 1945–1996
- Rank: General
- Commands: Guangzhou Military Region

Li Xilin (Chinese: 李希林; pinyin: Lǐ Xīlín; 2 October 1930 – 2 April 2024) was a general in the People's Liberation Army of China who served as commander of the Guangzhou Military Region from 1992 to 1996.

He was a delegate to the 7th National People's Congress. He was a member of the Standing Committee of the 9th Chinese People's Political Consultative Conference. He was a member of the 14th Central Committee of the Chinese Communist Party.

== Biography ==
Li was born Li Ruilin (李瑞林) in Ji County (now Jizhou District, Hengshui), Hebei, on 2 October 1930. He enlisted in the People's Liberation Army (PLA) in December 1945, and joined the Chinese Communist Party (CCP) in September 1947. He served in South Hebei Military District before serving in various administrative divisions of Hubei province. In 1954, he was assigned to the Guangzhou Military Region. He moved up the ranks to become deputy chief of staff in 1983 and chief of staff in 1985. In April 1990, he became deputy commander, rising to commander in October 1992.

He was promoted to the rank of lieutenant general (zhongjiang) in September 1988 and general (shangjiang) in May 1994.

Military offices
Preceded by Liu Cunzhi	Chief of Staff of the Guangzhou Military Region; 1985–1990	Succeeded by Chen Xianhua
Preceded by Zhu Dunfa	Commander of the Guangzhou Military Region; 1992–1996	Succeeded by Tao Bojun
