= Xing Shizhong =

General of the Chinese People's Liberation Army (1938–2019)

- 邢世忠

President of the PLA National Defence University
- In office 1995–2002
- Preceded by: Zhu Dunfa
- Succeeded by: Pei Huailiang

Personal details
- Born: September 1938 Licheng, Shandong, China
- Died: 11 March 2019 (aged 80) Beijing, China
- Party: Chinese Communist Party
- Education: PLA Nanjing Engineering Institute

Military service
- Allegiance: People's Republic of China
- Branch/service: People's Liberation Army Ground Force
- Years of service: 1953–2002
- Rank: General
- Battles/wars: Sino-Vietnamese War

Chinese name
- Chinese: 邢世忠
Transcriptions
Standard Mandarin
- Hanyu Pinyin: Xíng Shìzhōng
- Wade–Giles: Hsing Shih-chung
- IPA: [ɕǐŋ ʂîʈʂʊ́ŋ]

Xing Shizhong (Chinese: 邢世忠; September 1938 – 11 March 2019) was a general of the Chinese People's Liberation Army. He served as chief of staff and deputy commander of the Lanzhou Military Region and president of the PLA National Defence University (1995–2002). He was a member of the 15th Central Committee of the Chinese Communist Party.

== Biography ==
Xing was born in September 1938 in Licheng, Shandong, Republic of China. He enlisted in the People's Liberation Army (PLA) in 1953 and graduated from the PLA Nanjing Engineering Institute in 1956. He joined the Chinese Communist Party the following year. He was a classmate of Li Xinliang, who later served as commander of the Beijing Military Region.

Xing had a military career spanning 50 years. He served as an engineering officer and a regimental commander in the Guangzhou Military Region. He was considered a protege of General Zhang Wannian, and was also connected to General Fu Quanyou. He fought in the 1979 Sino-Vietnamese War, and was promoted to division commander for his performance in the war. He was later promoted to corps commander.

He served as Chief of Staff of the Lanzhou Military Region from 1985 to 1988, and was awarded the rank of major general in 1988. After 1988 he served as deputy commander of the Lanzhou MR, and attained the rank of lieutenant general in 1993. From 1995 to 2002 he served as president of the PLA National Defence University, an important position given the university's role in training top PLA officers. He was promoted to full general in March 1998.

Xing was elected to the 15th Central Committee of the Chinese Communist Party, serving from 1997 to 2002. He was also a delegate to the 7th, 8th, and 10th National People's Congresses.

Xing died in Beijing on 11 March 2019, at the age of 80.

== View on the China threat theory ==
In 1996, Xing published an article in the Communist Party journal Qiushi, entitled "Put an end to the China threat theory". He argued that the idea of a rising power threatening the existing order maintained by an established power is rooted in Western imperialism. This logic is imposed on China by the West, whose imperialism is the real cause of instability in the world. He further argued that since the United States maintains a large network of military bases far from its homeland and tries to impose its own values on other nations, it has been and will continue to be a cause of conflicts in the world.

Military offices
Preceded by Shi Guiting	Chief of Staff of the Lanzhou Military Region; 1985–1988	Succeeded by Guo Fuzhou
Preceded by Zhu Dunfa	President of the PLA National Defence University; 1995–2002	Succeeded by Pei Huailiang
