= Gong Gucheng =

- 龚谷成

Chief of Staff of the Guangzhou Military Region
- In office December 1993 – November 1996
- Preceded by: Tao Bojun
- Succeeded by: Song Wenhan

Personal details
- Born: December 1940 (age 85) Xinhua County, Hunan, China
- Party: Chinese Communist Party
- Education: PLA First Engineering Corps Technical School; PLA Military Academy

Military service
- Allegiance: People's Republic of China
- Branch/service: People's Liberation Army Ground Force
- Years of service: 1960–2008
- Rank: Lieutenant general
- Commands: Guangzhou Military Region
- Battles/wars: Vietnam War; Battle of the Paracel Islands; Sino-Vietnamese War

Chinese name
- Simplified Chinese: 龚谷成
- Traditional Chinese: 龔谷成
Transcriptions
Standard Mandarin
- Hanyu Pinyin: Gōng Gǔchéng

Gong Gucheng (Chinese: 龚谷成; born December 1940) is a lieutenant general in the People's Liberation Army of China. He was an alternate member of the 14th and 15th Central Committee of the Chinese Communist Party. He was a representative of the 16th National Congress of the Chinese Communist Party. He was a member of the Standing Committee of the 10th Chinese People's Political Consultative Conference. Throughout his military career, he participated in the Vietnam War, the Battle of the Paracel Islands, and the Sino-Vietnamese War.

== Biography ==
Gong was born in the town of Baixi, Xinhua County, Hunan, in December 1940, to Gong Guoguang (龚光国), a primary school teacher, and Chen Yueying (陈月英), a small merchant. He is the first of seven children. He attended Xinhua County No. 1 High School. He joined the Chinese Communist Party (CCP) in December 1958, and enlisted in the People's Liberation Army (PLA) in July 1960. He graduated from the PLA First Engineering Corps Technical School. In 1967, he was assigned to the Guangzhou Military Region, and eventually becoming chief of staff in December 1993 and deputy commander in November 1996. In 1998, he served as commander in chief of Hubei Yangtze River Flood Fighting Army, and in 1999, he served as commander in chief of Yiyang Flood Fighting Army. On August 8, 1998, the then Premier Zhu Rongji visited the disaster area in Hubei to inspect the disaster situation and hugged him closely. He retired in August 2008.

He was promoted to the rank of major general (shaojiang) in July 1990 and lieutenant general (zhongjiang) in July 1995.

Military offices
Preceded by Tao Bojun	Chief of Staff of the Guangzhou Military Region; 1993–1996	Succeeded by Song Wenhan
