= Changning =

Changning may refer to:

- Changning (prince) (1657–1703) was a prince of the Qing Dynasty.

== Places ==
- Changning, Shanghai (上海市 长宁区)
- Changning, Hunan (湖南省 常宁市)
- Changning County, Sichuan (四川省 长宁县)
- Changning County, Yunnan (云南省 昌宁县)
- Changning Subdistrict, Songyuan, in Ningjiang, Songyuan, Jilin (吉林省 松原市 宁江区)
- Changning Subdistrict, Xichang, Sichuan
- Changning Township, Gansu (昌宁乡), in Minle County
- Changning Township, Hebei (常宁乡), in Yu County

Towns

- Changning, Luannan County (长凝镇), Hebei
- Changning, Yongshou County (常宁镇), Shaanxi
- Changning, Jinzhong (长凝镇), in Yuci District, Jinzhong, Shanxi
- Changning, Xiangning County (昌宁镇), Shanxi

Written as "长宁镇":

- Changning, Guangdong, in Boluo County
- Changning, Jiangxi, in Xunwu County
- Changning, Qinghai, in Datong Hui and Tu Autonomous County
- Changning, Wugong County, Shaanxi
- Changning, Yibin, seat of Changning County, Sichuan
