= Fang Fenghui =

Chinese general

- 房峰辉
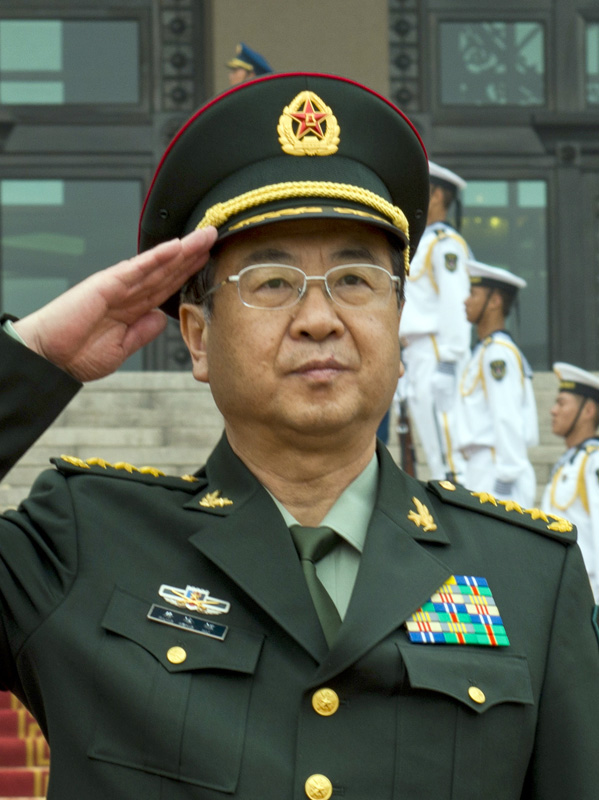

Chief of Joint Staff
- In office January 2016 – August 2017
- Preceded by: Position created
- Succeeded by: Li Zuocheng

Personal details
- Born: Ma Xianyang (马咸阳); April 1951 (age 75) Xunyi County, Shaanxi, China
- Party: Chinese Communist Party (1975–2018, expelled)
- Education: PLA National Defence University; National University of Defence Technology

Military service
- Allegiance: Chinese Communist Party
- Branch/service: People's Liberation Army Ground Force
- Years of service: 1968−2018
- Rank: General (stripped in 2018)

Chinese name
- Traditional Chinese: 房峰輝
- Simplified Chinese: 房峰辉
Transcriptions
Standard Mandarin
- Hanyu Pinyin: Fáng Fēnghuī

Fang Fenghui (born April 1951) is a former top general in the Chinese People's Liberation Army (PLA). He served as the Chief of Joint Staff and a member of the Central Military Commission. He was placed under investigation for corruption in 2017 and subsequently convicted.

== Biography ==
Fang was born Ma Xianyang (马咸阳) in Chidao Township, Xunyi County, Shaanxi Province. His father Ma Guoxuan (马国选) was a military and government officer who died in 1960. After his mother Fang Linjiang (房林江) remarried in Bin County, he renamed himself Fang Fenghui using his mother's surname.

Fang joined the PLA in February 1968, at the height of the Cultural Revolution. He served in Xinjiang in his early career. He later served as commander of the Beijing Military Region (2007–2012). and commander of Guangzhou Military Region (2003–2007). Fang achieved the rank of Major general in 1998, Lieutenant general in July 2005 and general in July 2010. He was appointed as the Chief of Joint Staff on October 25, 2012, succeeding Chen Bingde; when the Joint Staff department was re-organized in 2016 as a new organ under the Central Military Commission, Fang continued his role as chief of the joint staff.

During the 60th anniversary of the People's Republic of China, Fang served as the commanding officer of the military contingent during the inspection parade of then Central Military Commission chairman Hu Jintao.

In August 2017, Fang was placed under investigation for corruption. He was sent to military procuratorial organs in January 2018. He was expelled from the Communist Party on October 16, 2018. On February 20, 2019, Fang was sentenced to life imprisonment for bribery.

Fang was a member of the 17th and 18th Central Committees.

Military offices
Preceded by Zheng Shouzeng	Commander of the 21st Group Army; 1999–2003	Succeeded by Xu Fenlin
Preceded by Gao Chunxiang	Chief of Staff of the Guangzhou Military Region; 2003–2007	Succeeded by Xu Fenlin
Preceded by Zhu Qi	Commander of the Beijing Military Region; 2007–2012	Succeeded by Zhang Shibo
Preceded by Chen Bingde	Chief of the People's Liberation Army General Staff Department; 2012–2015	Succeeded by Position revoked
New title	Chief of Joint Staff Department of the Central Military Commission; 2016–2017	Succeeded by Li Zuocheng
