= Bachigang =

Bachigang 扒齿港镇
- Town
- Bāchǐgǎng Zhèn
- Location in Hebei Location in China
- Coordinates: 39°32′40″N 118°33′38″E
- Country: People's Republic of China
- Province: Hebei
- Prefecture-level city: Tangshan
- County: Luannan

Area
  - Total: 114.1 km^{2} (44.1 sq mi)

Population (2010)
  - Total: 38,376
  - Density: 336.4/km^{2} (871/sq mi)
- Time zone: UTC+8 (China Standard)

Bachigang (Chinese: 扒齿港镇; pinyin: Bāchǐgǎng Zhèn) is a town located in Luannan County, Tangshan, Hebei, China. According to the 2010 census, Bachigang had a population of 38,376, including 19,531 males and 18,845 females. The population was distributed as follows: 6,357 people aged under 14, 27,781 people aged between 15 and 64, and 4,238 people aged over 65.

== See also ==
- List of township-level divisions of Hebei
