= Chaozhou Vocational Technical School =

Vocational high school in Guangdong, China

潮州市职业技术学校

Location
- Fengyang Village, Guxiang Town, Chaoan District, Chaozhou City, Guangdong Province, China

Information
- Type: Vocational high school
- Motto: 奋发 勤学 实践 创新
- Established: 1983
- Principal: Xu Xuwen
- Staff: 221
- Enrollment: 4500
- Website: http://www.czzj.com

Chaozhou Vocational Technical School (Chinese: 潮州市职业技术学校) is a secondary school in Chaozhou City, Guangdong Province, China. It was founded in 1983. Its predecessor was the "Chaozhou Baihuatai Occupation High School", known to locals as the "Baihuatai". From under the Education Bureau of Chaozhou city.

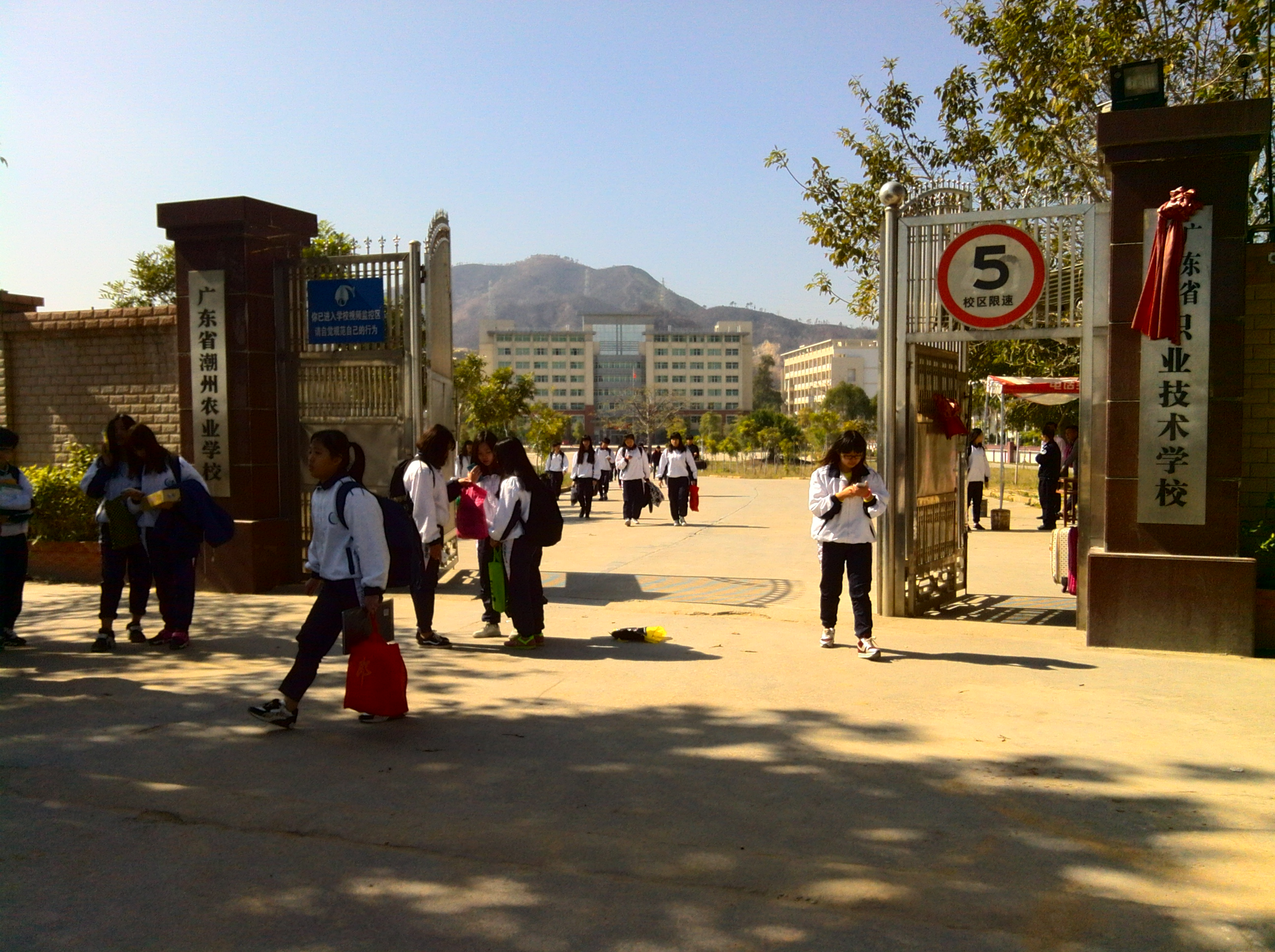
School Door (Fengyang campus)

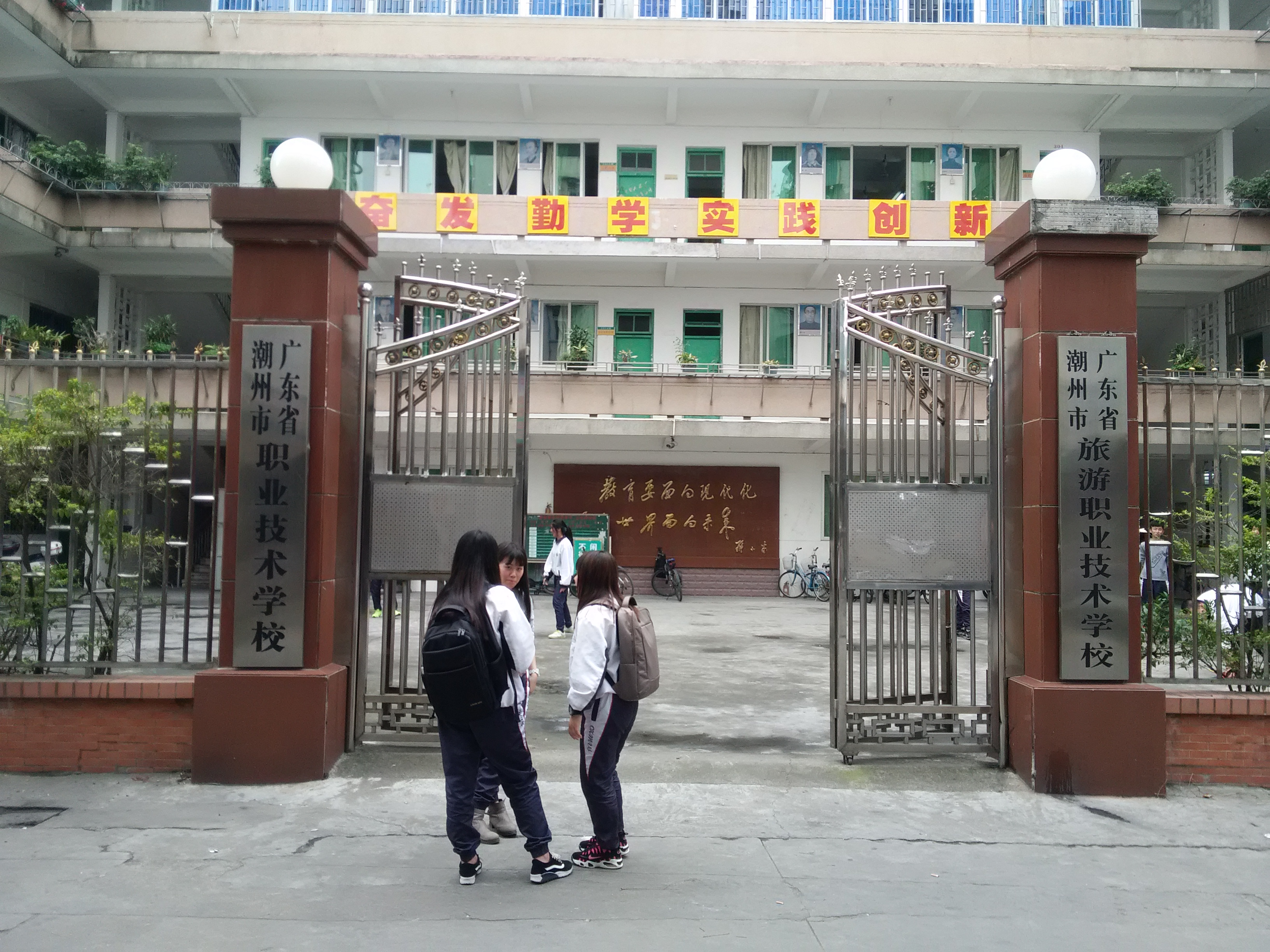
School Door (Guangaoxiang campus), After being taken over by Hongqiao vocational and technical school.

== History ==
The school was founded in September 1983.

In 2000, the "ordinary high fever" continues to heat up, the every year Chaozhou Baihuatai occupation school enrollment number less than 130 people, occupation education neglected. At this time, Zhang Senzhen served as the principal of the school, and has served as so far, the enrollment began to rise.

In 2006, in order to completely solve the problem of lack of educational facilities and revitalize the local secondary occupation education resources, Chaozhou city authorities decided in Chaoan county (now Chaoan District) Guxiang town, Fengyang village Chaozhou agricultural school campus expansion. Construction of new campus Feng Yang Chaozhou Municipal People's government has been listed as a key construction project in Chaozhou city.

In 2007, changed its name to "Chaozhou Vocational Technical School".

On September 17, 2009, when he was mayor of Chaozhou, Tang Xikun, to Fengyang new campus construction site inspections, and to speed up the construction of the new campus.

In 2011 August, Fengyang campus, built and put into use, the Chaozhou Vocational Technical School has two campuses.

On August 1, 2015, Chaozhou City Vocational and technical school generals tomorrow Lane campus transferred to Hongqiao vocational and technical school. Since then, Chaozhou City vocational technical schools only Fengyang a campus. On August 24, Xu Xuwen (former Chaozhou senior technical school principal) to replace Zhang Senzhen, came to power as president.

== Now ==
Chaozhou Vocational Technical School covers an area of 468.4 acres, a total of 221 students, staff, a total of more than 4500 people. Living facilities of the dormitories, canteens and other.Chaozhou Vocational Technical School since 2000 Zhang Senzhen came to power, the development speed to speed up the pace of the school, enrollment soaring. Plus 2011 Fengyang new campus building, the school covers an area of, the number of teachers and students has increased by two times the original. Now, Chaozhou Vocational Technical School is a vocational education in Chaozhou City, leading, and radiation throughout the eastern region.

=== Idea of the establishment ===
Technical Vocational College Chaozhou follows the educational principles of "Chaozhou culture, excellent skills and theory" and adopts a "double certificates" personnel training model. The college emphasizes graduate employment and adheres to the motto of "wish to go, school, study, make a real practice, innovation". It implements quality education, strengthens practical skills training, and promotes independent thinking, creativity, and innovation among students. The college follows the Party's basic line, adheres to the educational policy of the Communist Party of China, and promotes vocational education through the adoption of new technologies. Its approach to school management, education, and discipline has received recognition from society.

=== Teaching equipment ===
Chaozhou Vocational Technical School and technical education, training facilities and equipment, advanced multimedia education system of the modern multimedia network system was built. The modernization of the high level professional training facilities.

=== Campus life style ===
Campus life at Chaozhou Vocational Technical School includes a range of cultural, sporting, and extracurricular activities. On the eve of May 4 each year, the school holds a "May Fourth" art performance and a campus singing competition. The school's aerobics team participates in the biennial aerobics competition for schools and kindergartens in Chaozhou. The school also organizes activities through its trade union and student associations, as well as sporting events such as basketball tournaments. In October each year, students participate in a week-long military training programme conducted by instructors from a People's Liberation Army unit in the, Guangzhou military region based in Chaozhou. On March 12, National Tree Planting Day, members of the Communist Youth League participate in tree-planting activities.

=== Student life condition ===
According to the living conditions of students as boarders and day students, school students and day students and day students for lunch. Students have day card (divided into two categories, for the day and day lunch card), when the school day students are required to produce a certificate to the school. Students need to night in the classroom in the evening (or night), then to the dormitory, dormitory students Friday afternoon to go home, to next Monday afternoon off.

=== Traffic ===
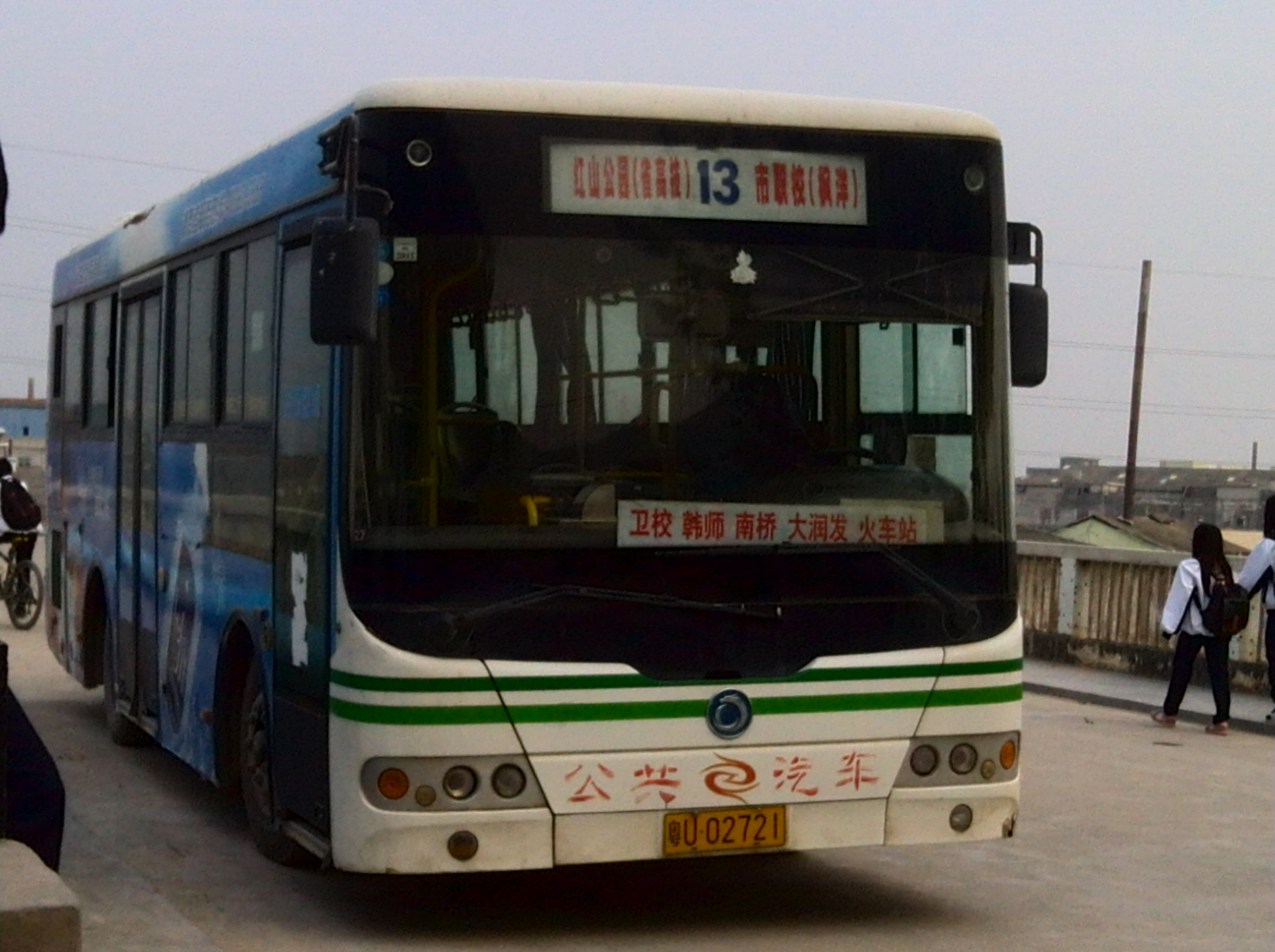
The No. 13 bus in Chaozhou City

Chaozhou Vocational Technical School with campuses in the ancient town of the two industrial zone Chaoan District Fengyang village, part of studying in the campus of the School of Chaozhou City, need to take the No. 13 bus (Fenguang Agricultural School - Jinshan middle school, Chaozhou city bus company limited to the school known as the "Fenguang Agricultural School"(Chinese: 枫洋农校)) to reach the campus so, after school.

== Campus facilities ==
- Comprehensive building (the principal's office, church and State Department, Dean, teachers in the office)
- Teaching building (room)
- Training building (computer)
- Library
- Stadium (mainly used for meetings, performances and sports competitions)
- Playground (basketball, football field, horizontal bar, parallel bars and other sports equipment in this)
- Dining room (a total of two layers, second layers with the restaurant staff)
- Dormitory (divided into student dormitories and staff accommodation)
- Host flag (hoisting Flag of the People's Republic of China)

== Majors ==
- Application of computer and network technology (Chinese: 计算机应用与网络技术)
- Business English (Chinese: 商务英语)
- Electronic commerce (Chinese: 电子商务)
- Accounting computerization (Chinese: 会计电算化)
- Application of electronic technology (Chinese: 电子技术应用)
- Vehicle use and repair (Chinese: 汽车运用与维修)
- Numerical control technology and die manufacturing (Chinese: 数控技术与模具制造)
- Design and art decoration process (Chinese: 装潢设计与美术工艺)
- Social culture and art (Chinese: 社会文化艺术)
- Tourism management and service (Chinese: 旅游管理与服务)
- Fashion and art design (Chinese: 服装艺术设计)
- Chaozhou cuisine (Chinese: 潮菜烹饪)
- Landscape Engineering (Chinese: 园林工程)
- Animal husbandry and veterinary medicine (Chinese: 畜牧兽医)
- Integrated management of rural economy (Chinese: 农村经济综合管理)
- Chaozhou opera (Chinese: 潮剧戏曲表演)

== Successive Principals ==
	Principal	Start	End
1	Zhang Senzhen	2000	24 August 2015
2	Xu Xuwen	24 August 2015	

== Uniform ==
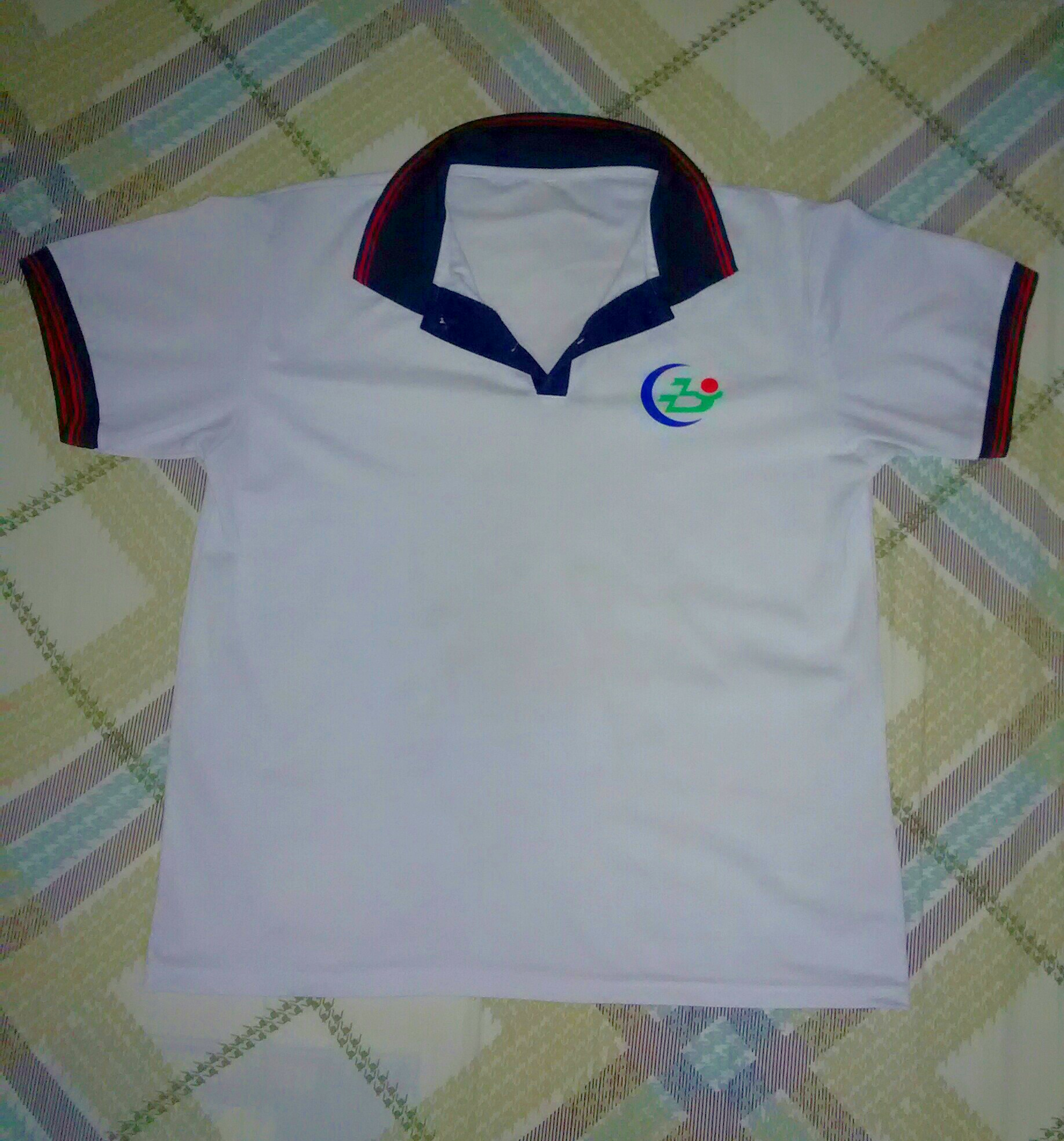
A Chaozhou Vocational Technical school summer uniforms

Chaozhou Vocational Technical School uniform in use today for the second edition, the replacement of the new school in the school enabled (specific time unknown at present), to replace the original first edition uniforms, uniforms and the uniforms in winter into summer.

- Summer school uniform coat, white collar and cuff, dark blue pattern with two red stripes, left chest painted emblem.
- Winter uniform jacket white collar and sleeve edges are dark blue, dark blue shoulder two line, sleeves with a thick black and blue, the edge of the bag, clothing is blue black, left chest painted emblem.
- For the dark blue trousers, with two pockets, pocket has a red white isosceles triangle, write "CZMVS (that is, the school's English abbreviation).".

== Gallery ==
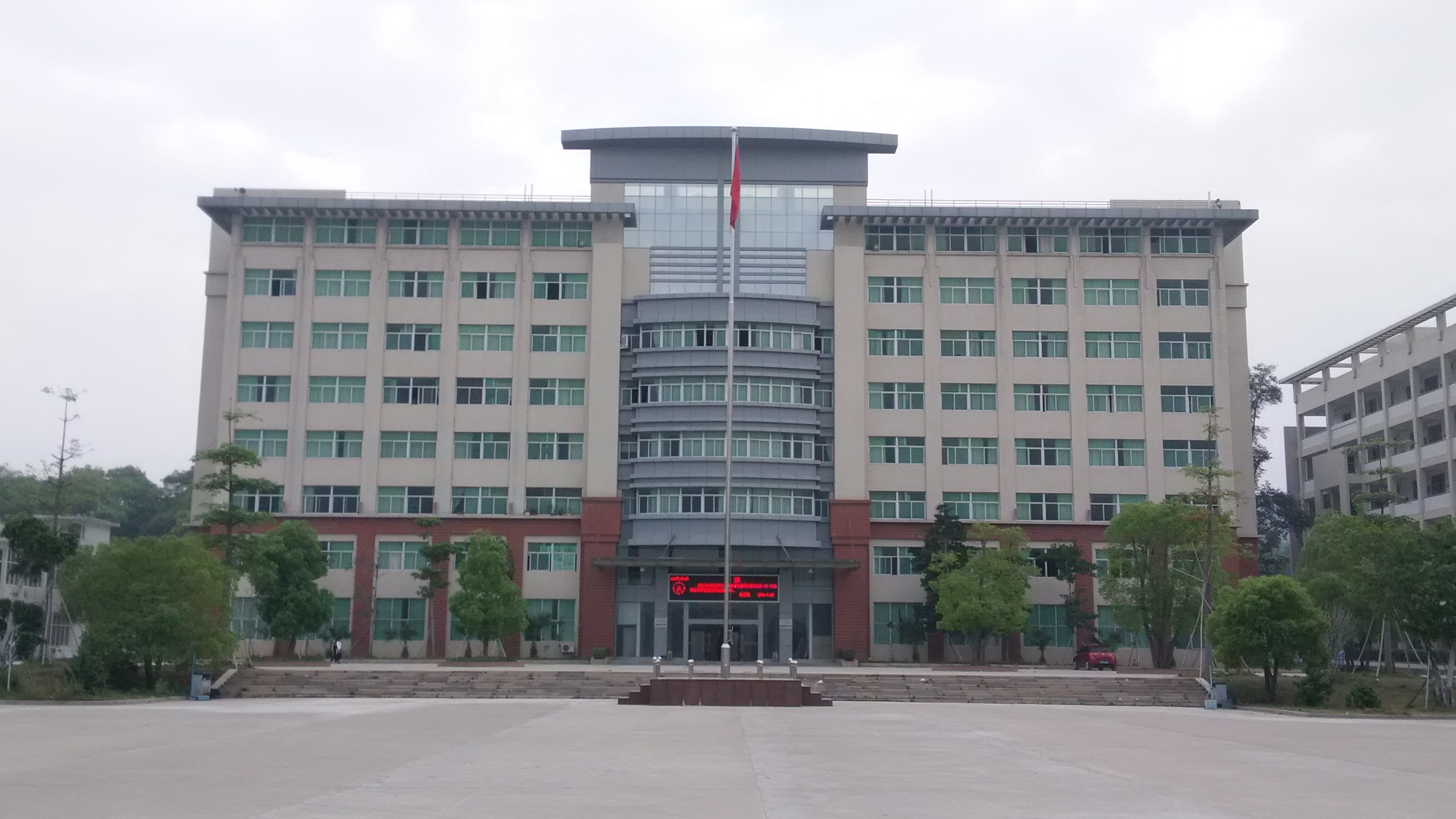
Comprehensive building

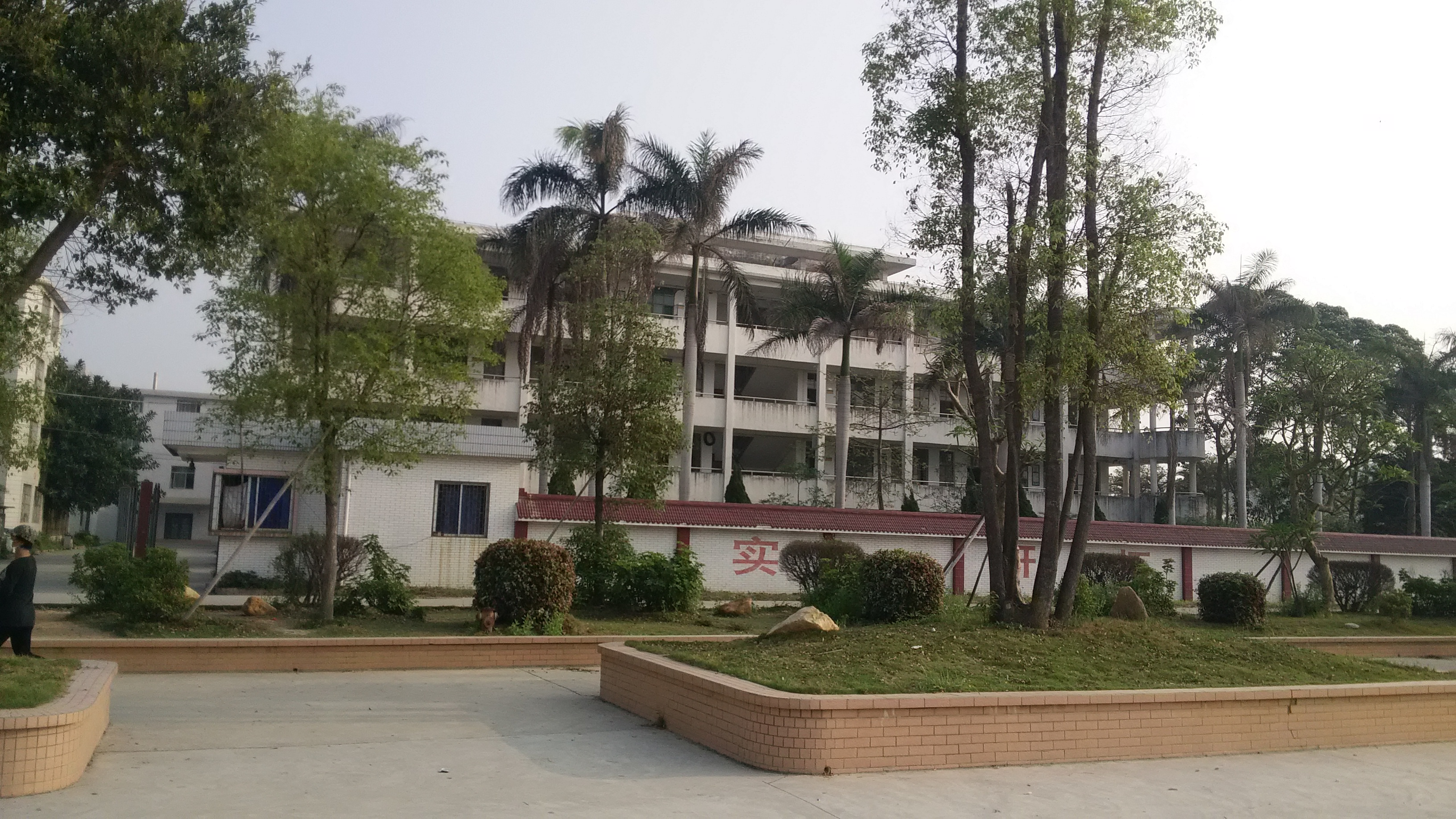
Old teaching building

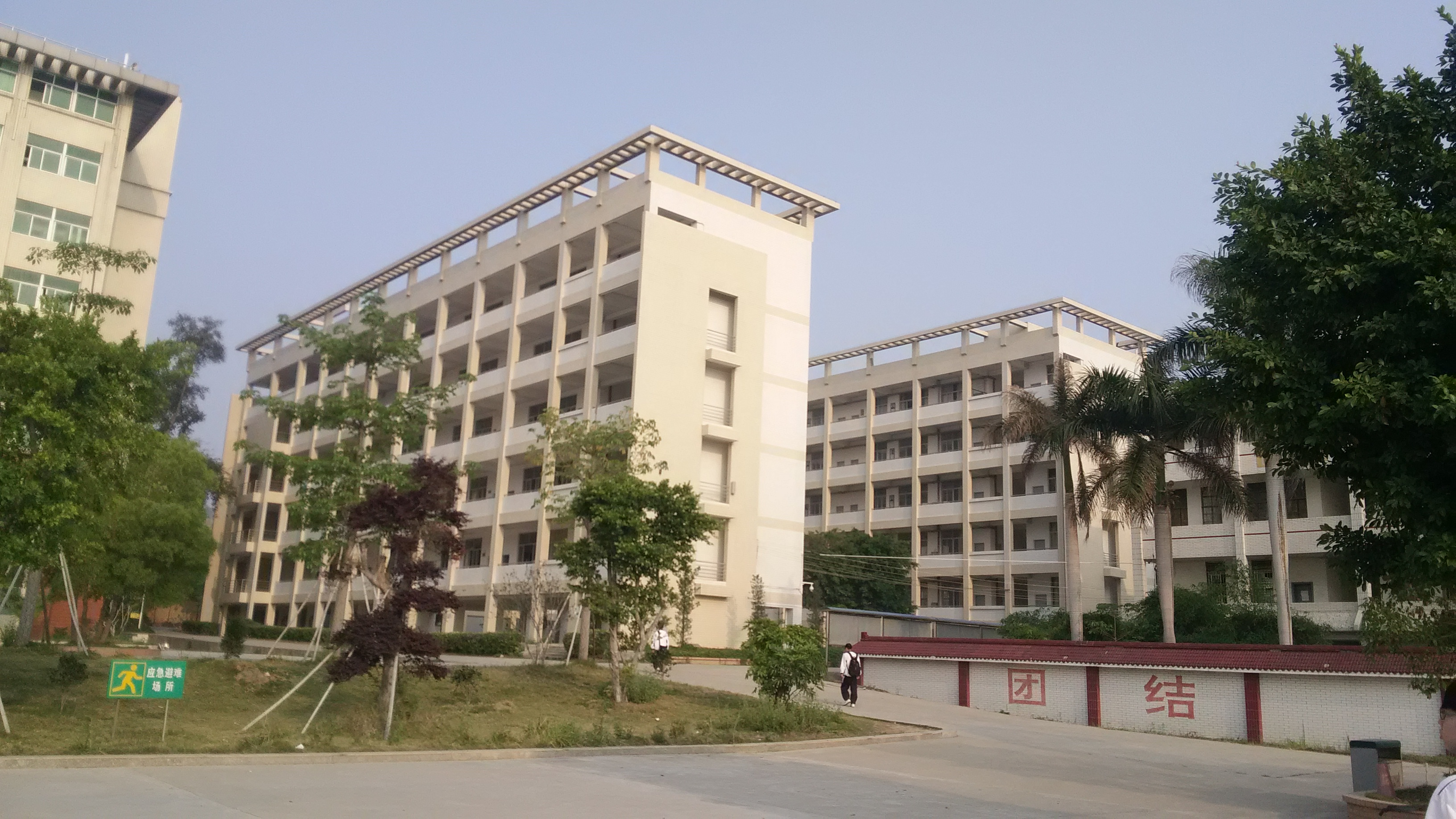
New teaching building

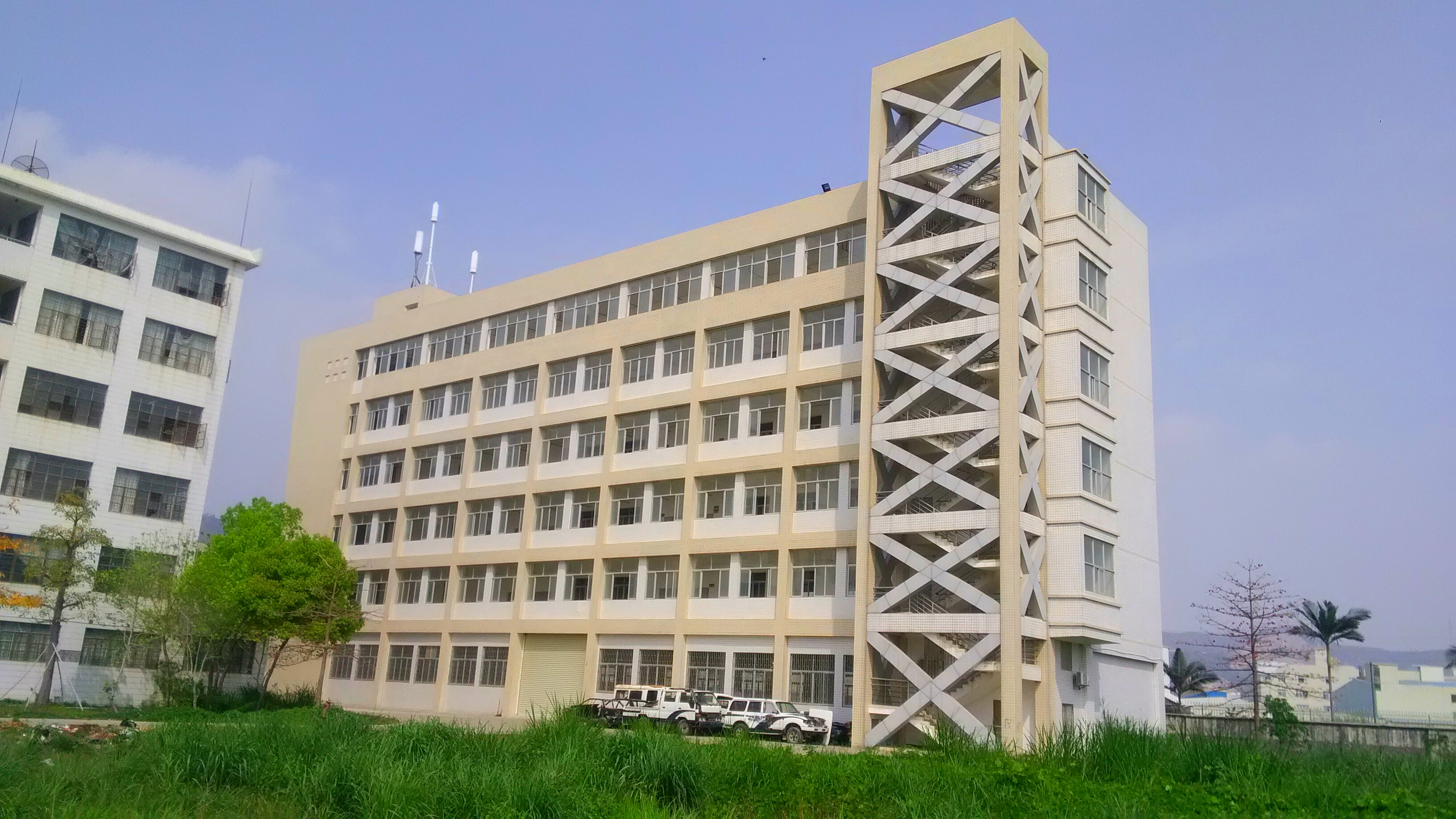
Training building

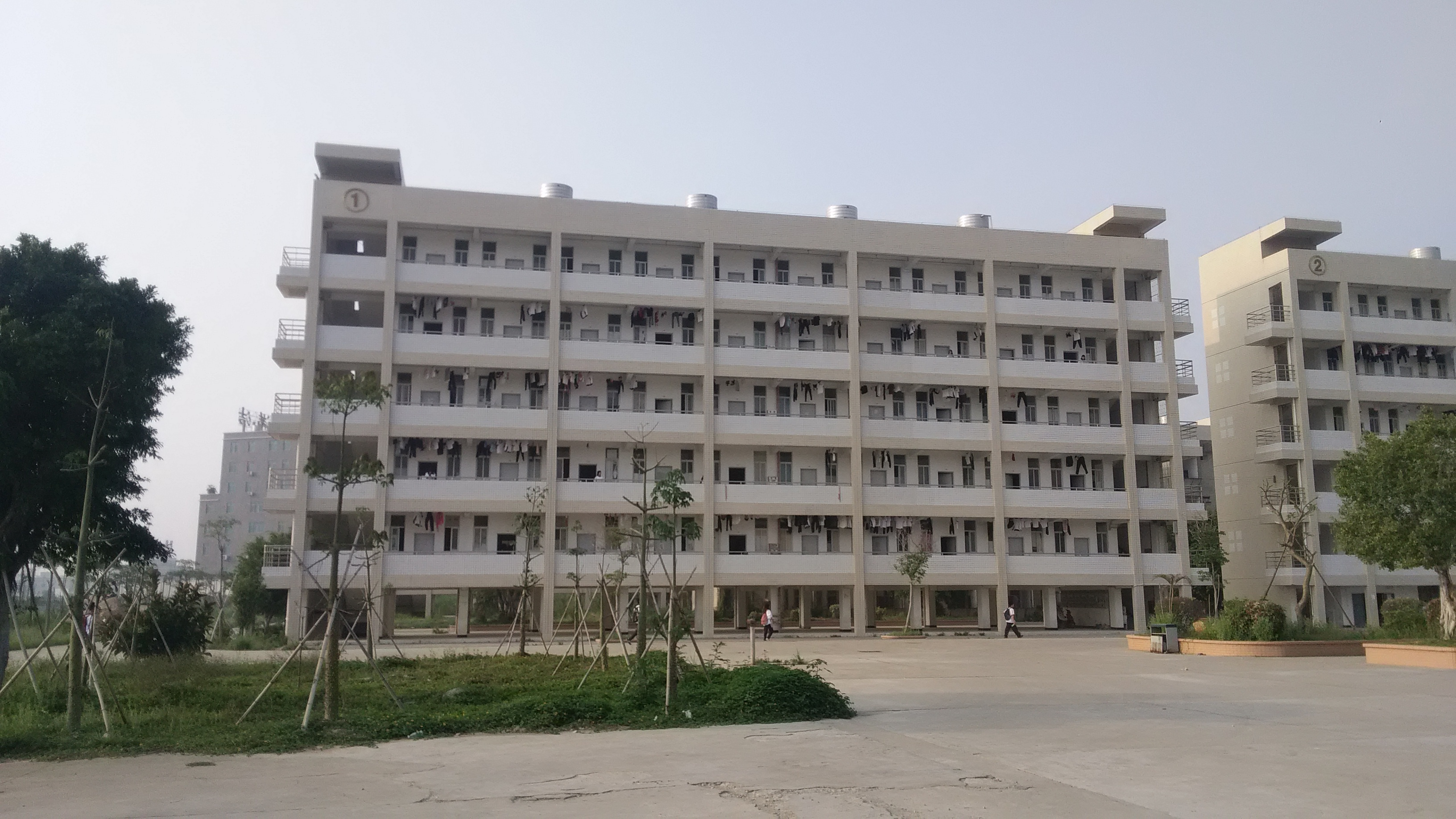
Dormitory

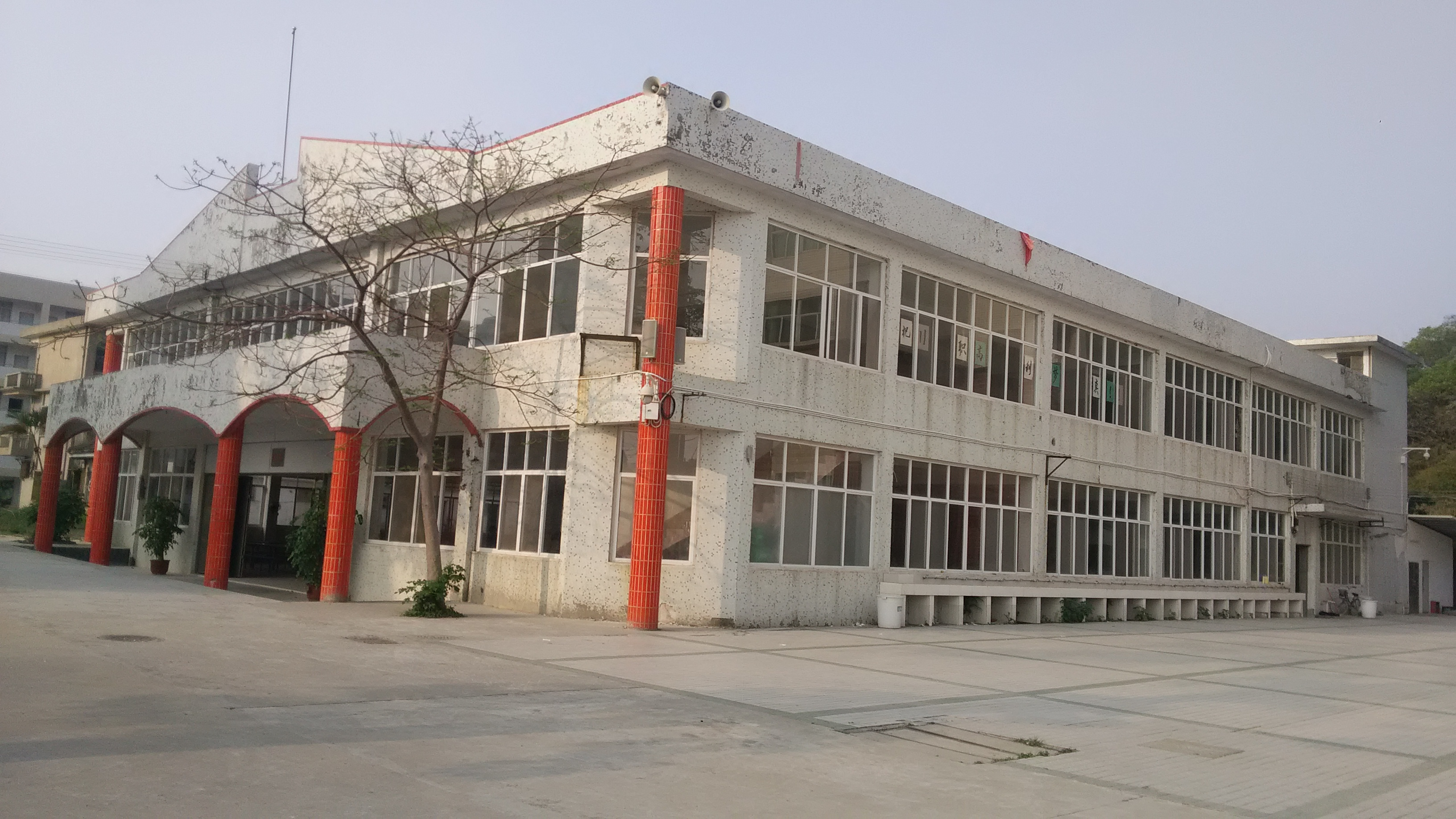
Dining room

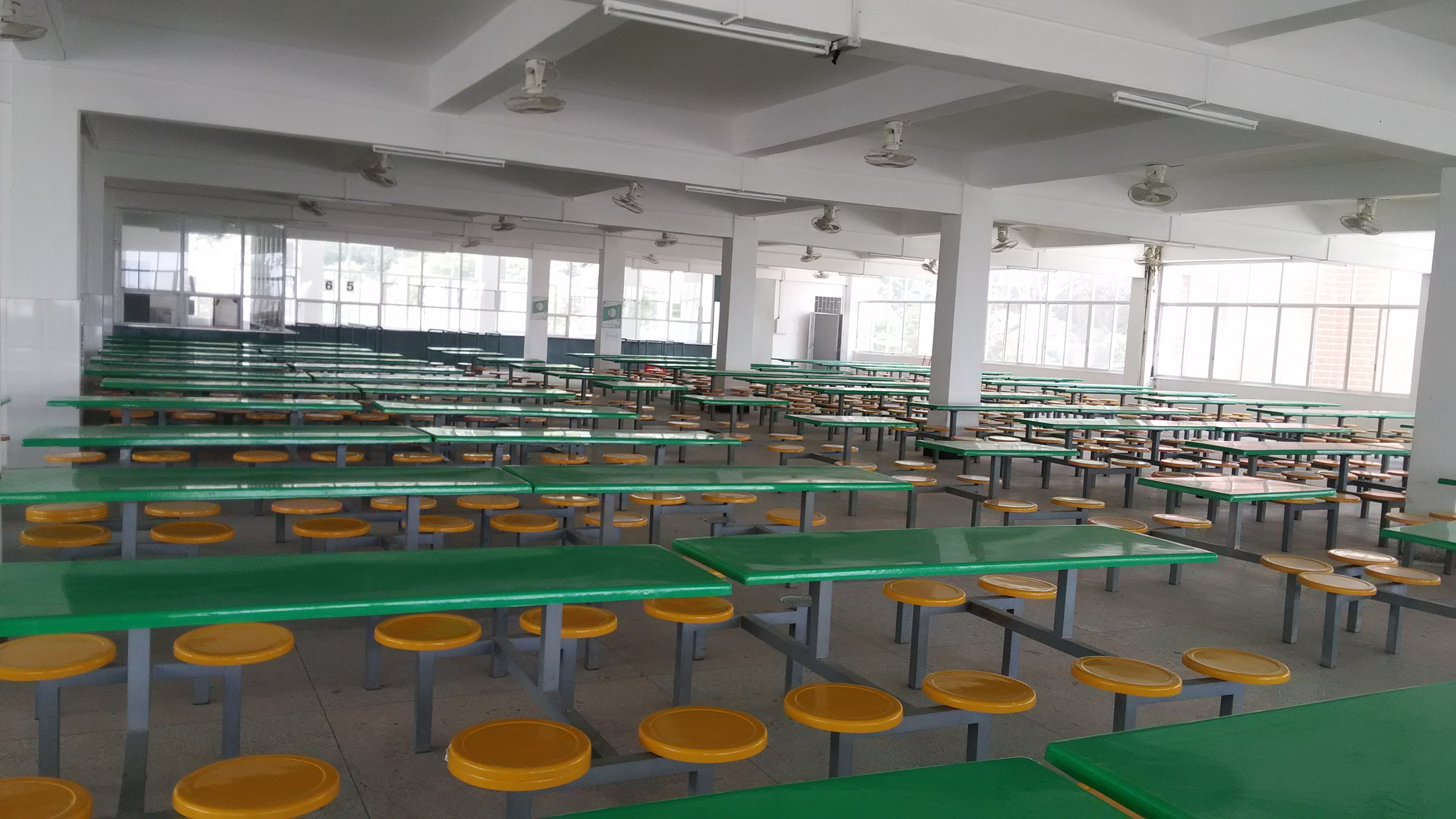
Dining room second layer

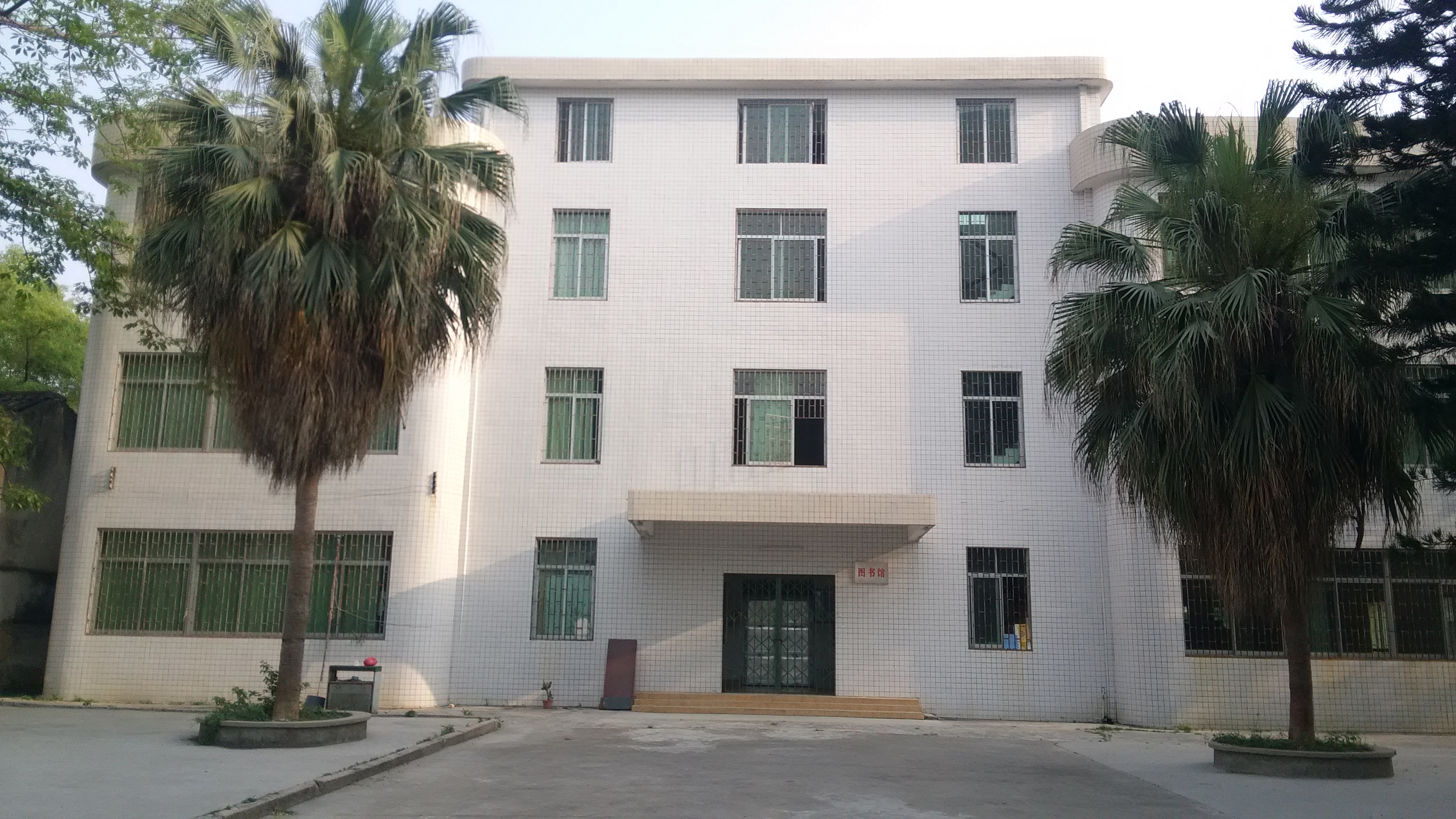
Library

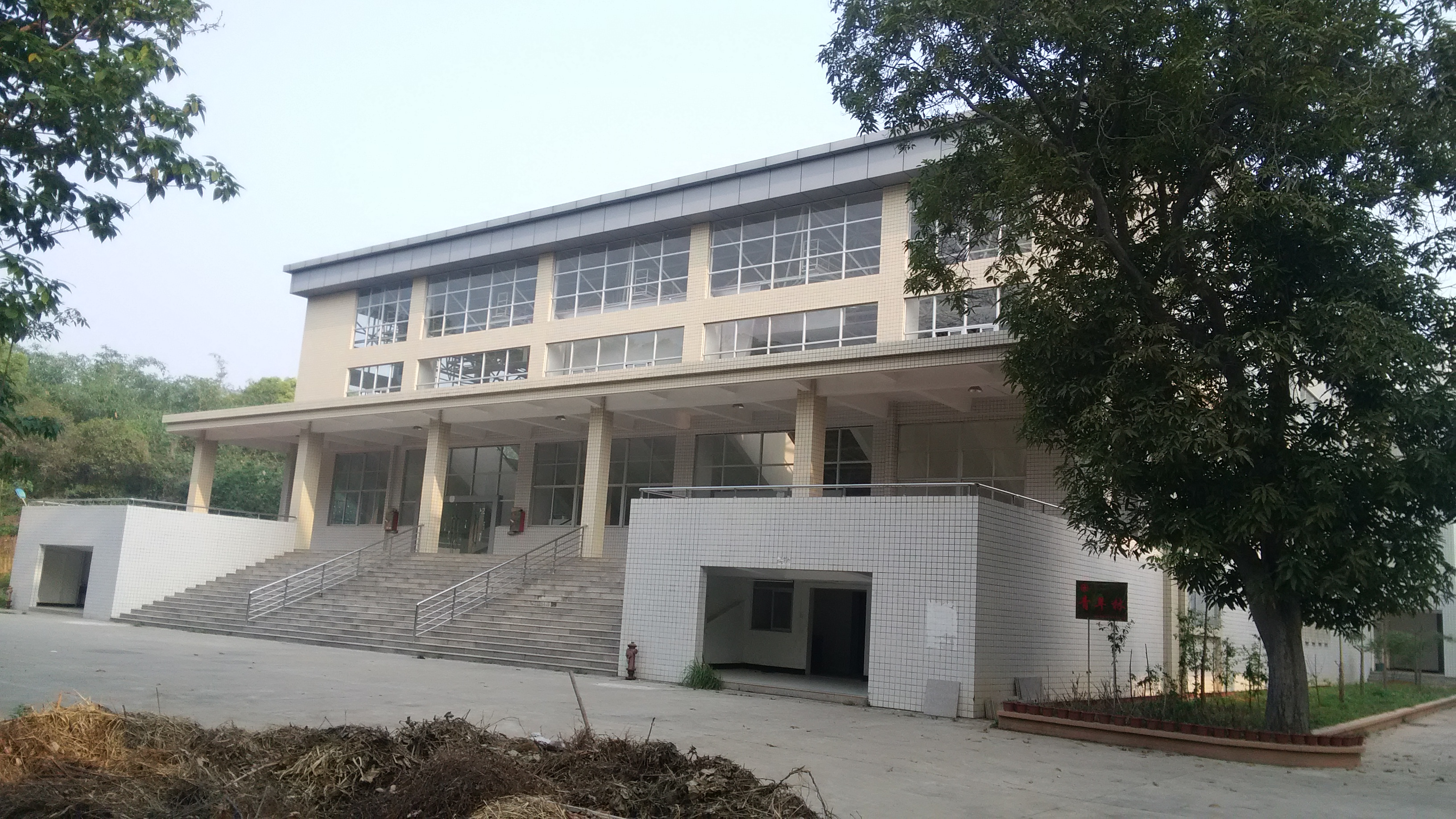
Stadium

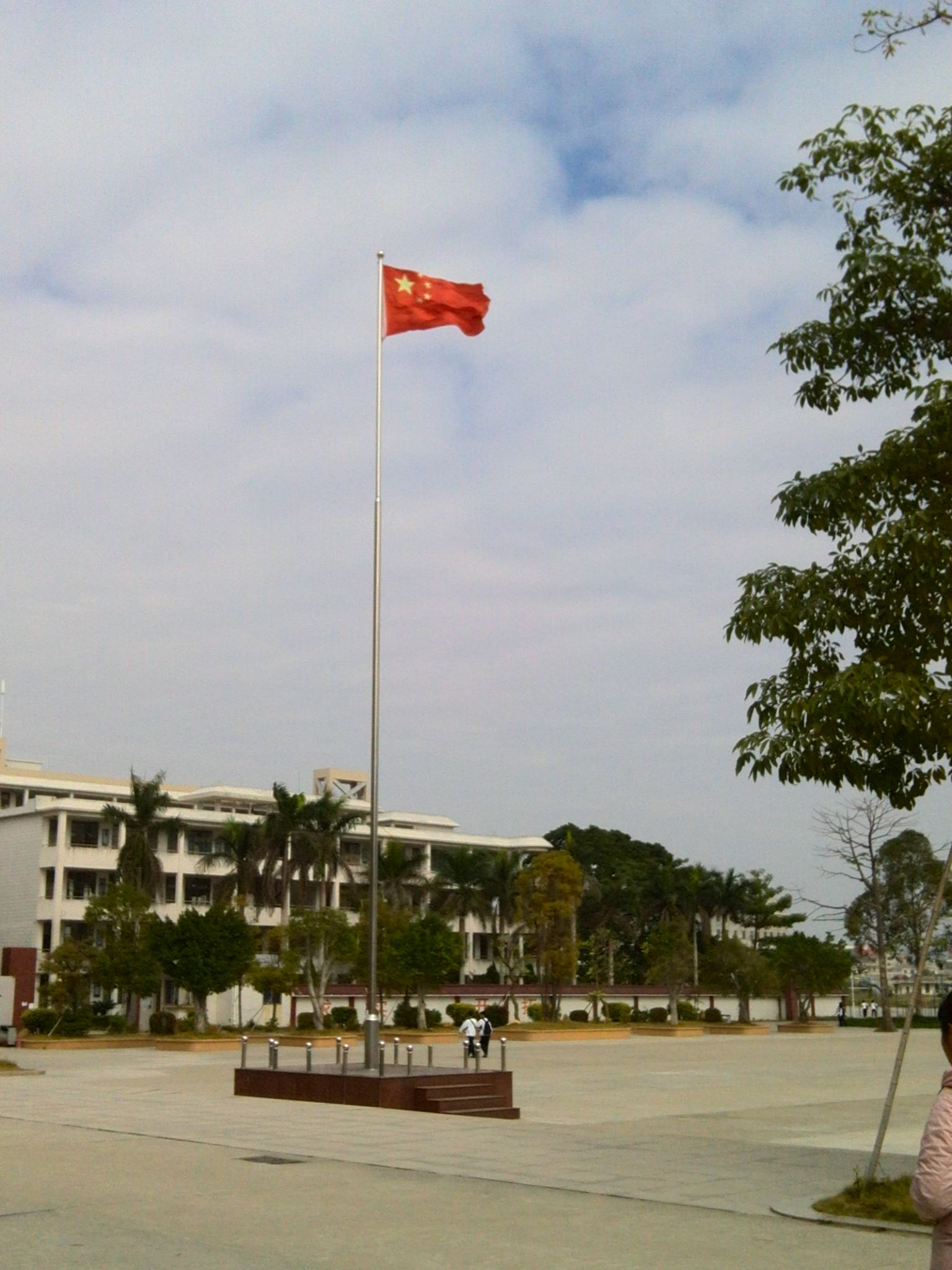
Host flag
