= Baigezhuang =

Baigezhuang 柏各庄镇
- Town
- Bǎigèzhuāng Zhèn
- Location in Hebei Location in China
- Coordinates: 39°18′22″N 118°30′56″E
- Country: People's Republic of China
- Province: Hebei
- Prefecture-level city: Tangshan
- County: Luannan

Area
  - Total: 90.67 km^{2} (35.01 sq mi)

Population (2010)
  - Total: 47,200
  - Density: 520.5/km^{2} (1,348/sq mi)
- Time zone: UTC+8 (China Standard)

Baigezhuang (Chinese: 柏各庄镇; pinyin: Bǎigèzhuāng Zhèn) is a town located in Luannan County, Tangshan, Hebei, China. According to the 2010 census, Baigezhuang had a population of 47,200, including 23,619 males and 23,581 females. The population was distributed as follows: 7,340 people aged under 14, 34,799 people aged between 15 and 64, and 5,061 people aged over 65.

== See also ==
- List of township-level divisions of Hebei
