= Liu Cunxin =

Chinese lieutenant general (1926–2020)

- 刘存信
- Liu Cunxin

Political Commissar of the Air Force of Shenyang Military Region
- In office January 1986 – January 1993
- Commander: Cao Shuangming
- Preceded by: Gao Xingmin
- Succeeded by: Ma Chi

Personal details
- Born: 1926 Qingyun County, Shandong, China
- Died: 2020 (aged 93–94) Beijing, China
- Party: Chinese Communist Party
- Relations: Liu Cunzhi
- Education: PLA Air Force Aviation School

Military service
- Allegiance: People's Republic of China
- Branch/service: People's Liberation Army Air Force
- Years of service: 1938–2020
- Rank: Lieutenant general
- Battles/wars: Second Sino-Japanese War; Chinese Civil War
- Awards: Order of Liberation (3rd Class); Order of Independence and Freedom (3rd Class)

Chinese name
- Simplified Chinese: 刘存信
- Traditional Chinese: 劉存信
Transcriptions
Standard Mandarin
- Hanyu Pinyin: Liú Cúnxìn

Liu Cunxin (Chinese: 刘存信; 1926 – 15 July 2020) was a lieutenant general (zhongjiang) of the People's Liberation Army (PLA). He was a representative of the 13th National Congress of the Chinese Communist Party. He was a delegate to the 4th National People's Congress. He was a member of the National Committee of the 8th Chinese People's Political Consultative Conference.

== Biography ==
Liu was born in Qingyun County, Shandong, in 1926. He enlisted in the Eighth Route Army in January 1938, and joined the Chinese Communist Party (CCP) in March 1939. He participated in the Second Sino-Japanese War. During the Chinese Civil War, he served in the war and engaged in the Liaoshen campaign, Pingjin campaign, and Battle of Hengbao. He became political commissar of the Air Force of Shenyang Military Region in January 1986, and served until January 1993. He attained the rank of lieutenant general (zhongjiang) in 1988. On 15 July 2020, he died of an illness in Beijing, at the age of 94.

== Personal life ==
His elder brother Liu Cunzhi was also a lieutenant general (zhongjiang) of the People's Liberation Army (PLA).

Military offices
Preceded by Gao Xingmin	Political Commissar of the Air Force of Shenyang Military Region; 1986–1993	Succeeded by Ma Chi
