= Fanggezhuang =

Fanggezhuang 方各庄镇
- Town
- Fānggèzhuāng Zhèn
- Location in Hebei Location in China
- Coordinates: 39°27′40″N 118°40′56″E
- Country: People's Republic of China
- Province: Hebei
- Prefecture-level city: Tangshan
- County: Luannan

Area
  - Total: 51.41 km^{2} (19.85 sq mi)

Population (2010)
  - Total: 29,010
  - Density: 564.3/km^{2} (1,462/sq mi)
- Time zone: UTC+8 (China Standard)

Fanggezhuang (Chinese: 方各庄镇; pinyin: Fānggèzhuāng Zhèn) is a town located in Luannan County, Tangshan, Hebei, China. According to the 2010 census, Fanggezhuang had a population of 29,010, including 14,693 males and 14,317 females. The population was distributed as follows: 4,118 people aged under 14, 21,477 people aged between 15 and 64, and 3,415 people aged over 65.

== See also ==
- List of township-level divisions of Hebei
