= Baixi, Xinhua =

Baixi Town 白溪镇
- Town
- Location in Hunan
- Coordinates: 28°01′27″N 111°17′37″E
- Country: People's Republic of China
- Province: Hunan
- Prefecture-level city: Loudi
- County: Xinhua County
- Time zone: UTC+8 (China Standard)
- Postal code: 417613
- Area code: 0738

Baixi Town (simplified Chinese: 白溪镇; traditional Chinese: 白溪鎮; pinyin: Báixī Zhèn) is an urban town in Xinhua County, Loudi City, Hunan Province, People's Republic of China.

== Administrative divisions ==
The town is divided into 75 villages and one community, which include the following areas:

- Xiangxue Community
- Yuejinping Village
- Xiaoxi Village
- Hejiaping Village
- Huangdatang Village
- Dayuan Village
- Xinyuan Village
- Minzhu Village
- Minxin Village
- Tanshan Village
- Yulin'ao Village
- Huangbanqiao Village
- Pengjia Village
- Aimin Village
- Tuanjie Village
- Xinfeng Village
- Qingshan Village
- Dalian Village
- Wangjia Village
- Qingjing Village
- Rentian Village
- Tangchong Village
- Chuanyan Village
- Shiziwan Village
- Baiyantang Village
- Qinghe Village
- Qingtang Village
- Hujiawan Village
- Baixi Village
- Shiban Village
- Huilong Village
- Baiyan Village
- Eyang Village
- Rixin Village
- Fengqiling Village
- Lantang Village
- Tianhe Village
- Fuxi Village
- Nongke Village
- Yongyang Village
- Guangming Village
- Maoping Village
- Pingxi Village
- Lijia Village
- Yanquan Village
- Dongliu Village
- Dongping Village
- Sumei Village
- Wujiatai Village
- Nongke Village
- Yantang Village
- Daping Village
- Shicha Village
- Liming Village
- Chaxi Village
- Xiangtang Village
- Zhangjia Village
- Yanshan Village
- Daxiong Village
- Baoxi Village
- Hengjiang Village
- Chenjia Village
- Zhushan Village
- Tongshang Village
- Daiguan Village
- Yintang Village
- Shuangjiang Village
- Hengsha Village
- Lujia Village
- Yanshan Village
- Hongzhu Village
- Feiyue Village
- Exi Village
- Changtan Village
- Daxi Village
- Dongxi Village

== Celebrity ==
- Gong Gucheng, a lieutenant general in the People's Liberation Army.
