= Pei Huailiang =

- 裴怀亮

President of the PLA National Defence University
- In office January 2003 – August 2006
- Preceded by: Xing Shizhong
- Succeeded by: Ma Xiaotian

Personal details
- Born: May 1941 (age 85) Xinjiang County, Shanxi, China
- Party: Chinese Communist Party
- Education: Shanxi Water Conservancy College

Military service
- Allegiance: People's Republic of China
- Branch/service: People's Liberation Army Ground Force
- Years of service: 1961–2006
- Rank: General

Chinese name
- Simplified Chinese: 裴怀亮
- Traditional Chinese: 裴懷亮
Transcriptions
Standard Mandarin
- Hanyu Pinyin: Péi Huáiliàng

Pei Huailiang (Chinese: 裴怀亮; born May 1941) is a general in the People's Liberation Army of China who served as president of the PLA National Defence University from 2003 to 2006.

He was a delegate to the 7th and 8th National People's Congress, and a member of the Standing Committee of the 11th National People's Congress. He was an alternate member of the 14th, 15th, and 16th Central Committee of the Chinese Communist Party.

== Biography ==
Pei was born in Xinjiang County, Shanxi, in May 1941, and graduated from Shanxi Water Conservancy College.

He enlisted in the People's Liberation Army (PLA) and joined the Chinese Communist Party (CCP) in July 1961. He was assigned to the 21st Group Army in 1978. He was named chief of staff in 1983. He moved up the ranks to become deputy commander in August 1985 and commander in December 1986. He was deputy chief of staff of the Nanjing Military Region in 1990 and deputy commander of the Jinan Military Region in December 1993. He became president of the PLA National Defence University in January 2003, and served until August 2006. In March 2008, he took office as a member of the National People's Congress Foreign Affairs Committee.

He was promoted to the rank of major general (shaojiang) in September 1988, lieutenant general (zhongjiang) in July 1995, and general (shangjiang) in June 2006.

Military offices
Preceded by Zhu Pengxiang	Chief of Staff of the 21st Group Army; 1983–1985	Succeeded by Fang Denghua
Preceded by Wang Ke	Commander of the 21st Group Army; 1986–1990	Succeeded by Qian Shugen
Preceded by Xing Shizhong	President of the PLA National Defence University; 2003–2006	Succeeded by Ma Xiaotian
