= Liu Zhenwu =

Chinese general

- 刘镇武
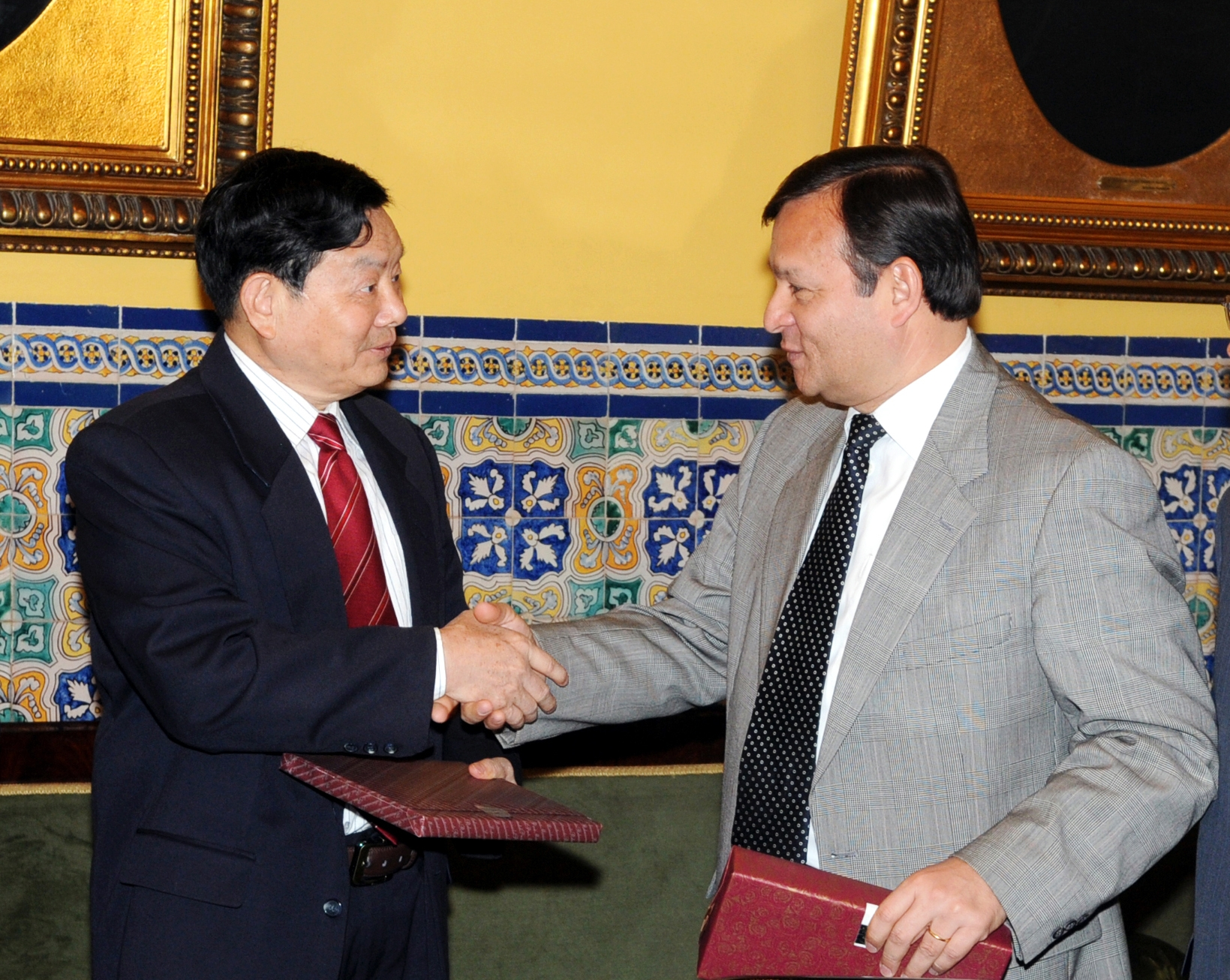
- Liu in September 2010

Deputy Chief of PLA General Staff
- In office June 2007 – July 2009
- Chief: Chen Bingde

Commander of the Guangzhou Military Region
- In office January 2002 – June 2007
- Preceded by: Tao Bojun
- Succeeded by: Zhang Qinsheng

Commander of the PLA Hong Kong Garrison
- In office 1997 (preparatory since 1994) – 1999
- Preceded by: New command
- Succeeded by: Xiong Ziren

Personal details
- Born: August 1945 (age 80) Nan County, Hunan, China
- Party: Chinese Communist Party

Military service
- Allegiance: People's Republic of China
- Branch/service: People's Liberation Army Ground Force
- Years of service: 1961–2009
- Rank: General

Chinese name
- Simplified Chinese: 刘镇武
- Traditional Chinese: 劉鎮武
Transcriptions
Standard Mandarin
- Hanyu Pinyin: Liú Zhènwǔ

Liu Zhenwu (Chinese: 刘镇武; born August 1945) is a retired general (shangjiang) of the Chinese People's Liberation Army (PLA). He was the first Commander of the PLA Hong Kong Garrison, and later served as Deputy Commander and Commander of the Guangzhou Military Region, and Deputy Chief of the PLA General Staff Department.

== Biography ==
Liu Zhenwu was born in August 1945 in Nan County, Hunan Province. He enlisted in the People's Liberation Army (PLA) in July 1961, serving in the 370th Regiment of the 124th Division of the 42nd Group Army. He joined the Chinese Communist Party (CCP) in June 1964.

Starting as an ordinary soldier, Liu rose through the ranks of the 42nd Army, becoming chief of staff in August 1983. In 1987 he studied military science at the PLA National Defence University. He became deputy commander of the 42nd Army in December 1989, and commander in July 1992. He was promoted to the rank of major general in July 1990.

In 1994, when the PLA Hong Kong Garrison was being formed in preparation for the handover of Hong Kong, Liu was named its first commander. In this capacity, he toured Hong Kong's military bases and facilities in July 1996, accompanied by Major General Bryan Dutton, the outgoing commander of the British Forces Overseas Hong Kong. Soon after Hong Kong's handover from Britain to China on 1 July 1997, Liu was promoted to lieutenant general at the end of the month, outranking his British predecessors. He commanded about 15,000 soldiers in the garrison, most of whom were based across the border in mainland China. In September 1997, he became an alternate member of the 15th Central Committee of the Chinese Communist Party.

In March 1999, Liu became Deputy Commander of the Guangzhou Military Region, which oversaw the Hong Kong Garrison. He was promoted to Commander of the Guangzhou MR in January 2002, and became a full member of the CCP's 16th Central Committee in November. He was awarded the rank of full general (shangjiang) in June 2004.

In June 2007, Liu was transferred to Beijing to serve as Deputy Chief of the PLA General Staff Department, a position he held until July 2009. He retired from his military career, and was appointed in February 2010 as deputy director of the Foreign Affairs Committee of the 11th National People's Congress.

Military offices
New title	Commander of the PLA Hong Kong Garrison; 1997–1999	Succeeded by Xiong Ziren
Preceded by Tao Bojun	Commander of the Guangzhou Military Region; 2002–2007	Succeeded by Zhang Qinsheng
