= Zhang Qinsheng =

Chinese general

- 章沁生
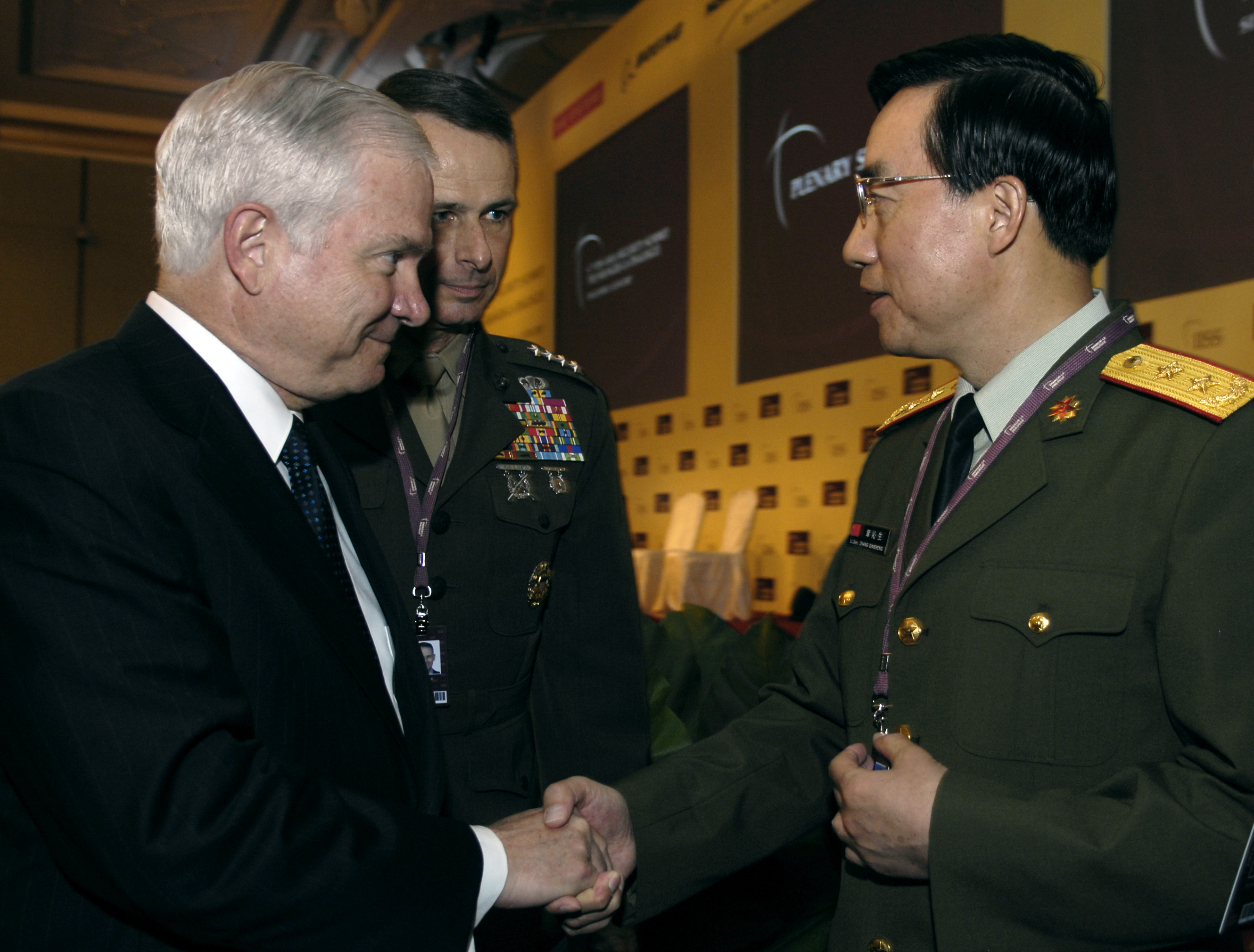
- Zhang Qinsheng meets US Defense Secretary Robert M. Gates in Singapore in 2007

Commander of the Guangzhou Military Region
- In office June 2007 – December 2009
- Preceded by: Liu Zhenwu
- Succeeded by: Xu Fenlin

Personal details
- Born: May 1948 (age 77) Xiaoyi, Shanxi, China
- Party: Chinese Communist Party

Military service
- Allegiance: People's Republic of China
- Branch/service: People's Liberation Army Ground Force
- Rank: General

Zhang Qinsheng (Chinese: 章沁生; pinyin: Zhāng Qìnshēng; born May 1948) is a retired general (shangjiang) of the Chinese People's Liberation Army, best known for his term as the First Deputy Chief of the PLA General Staff.

== Biography ==
Zhang was born in Xiaoyi, Shanxi. His posts included vice director of military training department of PLA General Staff Department (GSD), director of teaching & research office of campaign of PLA National Defense University (NDU), provost of NDU, and director of the battle department of the GSD. In December 2004, he was elevated to assistant to the chief of the GSD, and was promoted to deputy chief in December 2006. In 2007, he was appointed as commander of the Guangzhou Military Region. In December 2009, he was appointed as the First Deputy Chief of the General Staff, succeeding Ge Zhenfeng. Xu Fenlin succeeded him as commander of the Guangzhou MR.

He attained the rank of lieutenant general in July 2006, and the rank of general in July 2010. It was said that in the lead up to the 18th National Congress of the Chinese Communist Party in the autumn of 2012, Zhang was vying for a seat on the Central Military Commission, but was not successful. In response to what he saw as a snub for promotion onto the top military ruling council, Zhang vented his anger at a banquet for senior military officials, apparently prompting President Hu Jintao to walk out in protest. He retired from his active posts in 2013, and was given a position as deputy chair of the National People's Congress Financial and Economic Affairs Committee, which effectively ended his military career.

Zhang was a member of 17th Central Committee of the Chinese Communist Party.

Military offices
Preceded by Lü Dengming	Head of the Operations Department of the General Staff of the People's Liberation Army; 2003–2004	Succeeded by Qi Jianguo
Preceded by Fan Changlong	Assistant to the Chief of General Staff of the People's Liberation Army; 2004–2006	Succeeded by Sun Jianguo
Preceded by Wu Shengli	Deputy Chief of General Staff of the People's Liberation Army; 2006–2007	Succeeded by Liu Zhenwu
Preceded by Liu Zhenwu	Commander of the Guangzhou Military Region; 2007–2009	Succeeded by Xu Fenlin
Preceded by Ge Zhenfeng	Deputy Chief of General Staff of the People's Liberation Army; 2009–2013	Succeeded by Wang Ning
