= Donghuangtuo =

Donghuangtuo 东黄坨镇
- Town
- Dōnghuángtuó Zhèn
- Location in Hebei Location in China
- Coordinates: 39°21′00″N 118°28′57″E
- Country: People's Republic of China
- Province: Hebei
- Prefecture-level city: Tangshan
- County: Luannan

Area
  - Total: 61.90 km^{2} (23.90 sq mi)

Population (2010)
  - Total: 16,217
  - Density: 262/km^{2} (680/sq mi)
- Time zone: UTC+8 (China Standard)

Donghuangtuo (Chinese: 东黄坨镇; pinyin: Dōnghuángtuó Zhèn) is a town located in Luannan County, Tangshan, Hebei, China. According to the 2010 census, Donghuangtuo had a population of 16,217, including 8,171 males and 8,046 females. The population was distributed as follows: 2,663 people aged under 14, 11,744 people aged between 15 and 64, and 1,810 people aged over 65.

== See also ==
- List of township-level divisions of Hebei
