= Xu Fenlin =

Chinese general (born 1953)

- 徐粉林
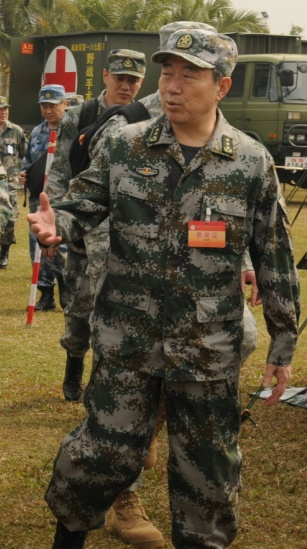
- image of Xu Fenlin with General Brooks

Deputy Chief of Joint Staff
- In office 2016–2017

Commander of the Guangzhou Military Region
- In office December 2009 – January 2016
- Preceded by: Zhang Qinsheng
- Succeeded by: Position abolished

Personal details
- Born: July 1953 (age 72–73) Jintan County, Jiangsu, China
- Party: Chinese Communist Party
- Education: Central Party School of the Chinese Communist Party

Military service
- Allegiance: People's Republic of China
- Branch/service: People's Liberation Army Ground Force
- Years of service: 1969–2017
- Rank: General
- Commands: Guangzhou Military Region

Xu Fenlin (Chinese: 徐粉林; pinyin: Xú Fěnlín; born July 1953) is a retired general (shangjiang) of the Chinese People's Liberation Army who served as Deputy Chief of the Joint Staff from 2016 to 2017. Prior to that, he was the final Commander of the Guangzhou Military Region between 2009 and 2016, before its abolition in January 2016.

== Biography ==
Xu Fenlin was born in July 1953 in Jintan County, Jiangsu in July 1953. He has a bachelor's degree in economics and management from the Central Party School of the Chinese Communist Party. He attained the rank of major general in July 2002, lieutenant general in July 2008, and full general in July 2013.

Xu served as Chief-of-Staff of the Guangzhou Military Region from 2007 to 2009, and was promoted to Commander in 2009. He stayed in the role for some six years, before being transferred to the Joint Staff to serve as deputy chief.

He was an alternate of the 17th Central Committee of the Chinese Communist Party and a full member of the 18th Central Committee.

Military offices
Preceded by Chang Wanquan	Commander of the 47th Group Army; 2002–2004	Succeeded by Peng Yong
Preceded by Fang Fenghui	Commander of the 21st Group Army; 2004–2007	Succeeded by He Qingcheng
Preceded by Fang Fenghui	Chief of Staff of the Guangzhou Military Region; 2007–2009	Succeeded by Jia Xiaowei
Preceded by Zhang Qinsheng	Commander of the Guangzhou Military Region; 2009–2016	Succeeded by Jia Xiaowei
