= Zhu Qi =

Chinese general (born 1942)

- 朱启

Commander of the Beijing Military Region
- In office January 2002 – 2007
- Preceded by: Li Xinliang
- Succeeded by: Fang Fenghui

Chief of Staff of the Beijing Military Region
- In office April 1998 – January 2002
- Preceded by: Chen Xitao
- Succeeded by: Gao Zhongxing

Chief of Staff of the Chengdu Military Region
- In office January 1996 – March 1998
- Preceded by: Chen Xianhua
- Succeeded by: Jin Renxie

Personal details
- Born: May 1942 (age 84) Xiangyun County, Yunnan, China
- Party: Chinese Communist Party
- Education: Central Party School of the Chinese Communist Party

Military service
- Allegiance: People's Republic of China
- Branch/service: People's Liberation Army Ground Force
- Years of service: 1960–2007
- Rank: General

Chinese name
- Simplified Chinese: 朱启
- Traditional Chinese: 朱啟
Transcriptions
Standard Mandarin
- Hanyu Pinyin: Zhū Qǐ

Zhu Qi (Chinese: 朱启; born May 1942) was a general of the Chinese People's Liberation Army. He formerly served as commander of the Beijing Military Region.

== Biography ==
Zhu Qi is from Xiangyun County, Yunnan, China. He graduated from the Central Party School of the Chinese Communist Party with a degree in economic administration.

In January 1960 he entered the Chinese People's Liberation Army. In August 1961 he entered the Chinese Communist Party.

Zhu Qi took part in high-level talks between U.S. and Chinese military officials as part of the Sanye Initiative organized by the East West Institute from June 16 to 19, 2012. Delegates covered topics including U.S. arms sales to Taiwan and managing military relationships.

== History ==
- From January 1960 to June 1964, squad leader and company clerk
- From June 1964 to June 1965, squad leader and battalion secretary
- From June 1965 to June 1971, staff officer, operations and training section, regimental command department
- From June 1971 to October 1979, assistant chief and chief, operations and training section, division command department
- From October 1979 to October 1981, deputy chief of staff, division command division
- From October 1981 to July 1984, regiment commander (from September 1982 to July 1984 completed studies at the PLA Military Academy)
- From July 1984 to November 1984, division deputy commander
- From November 1984 to August 1985, division commander
- From August 1985 to April 1989, army chief of staff
- From April 1989 to June 1990, army deputy commander
- From June 1990 to March 1994, commander of the Guizhou province military area
- From March 1994 to January 1996, commander of [an unknown] army
- From January 1996 to March 1998, chief of staff for the Chengdu Military Region
- From March 1998 to January 2002, chief of staff for the Beijing Military Region.
- From January 2002 to 2007, commander of the Beijing Military Region.

GEN Zhu Qi was promoted to MGEN in July 1990, LTGEN July 1997, and GEN in June 2004. A member of the 16th National People's Congress

Military offices
Preceded by Jiao Bin	Commander of the PLA Guizhou Military District; 1990–1994	Succeeded by Zhong Liming
Preceded by Chen Xianhua	Chief of Staff of the Chengdu Military Region; 1996–1998	Succeeded by Jin Renxie
Preceded by Chen Xitao	Chief of Staff of the Beijing Military Region; 1998–2002	Succeeded by Gao Zhongxing
Preceded by Li Xinliang	Commander of the Beijing Military Region; 2002–2007	Succeeded by Fang Fenghui
