= Changning, Luannan County =

Changning 长凝镇
- Town
- Chángníng Zhèn
- Location in Hebei Location in China
- Coordinates: 39°35′03″N 118°47′47″E
- Country: People's Republic of China
- Province: Hebei
- Prefecture-level city: Tangshan
- County: Luannan

Area
  - Total: 53.91 km^{2} (20.81 sq mi)

Population (2010)
  - Total: 34,476
  - Density: 639.5/km^{2} (1,656/sq mi)
- Time zone: UTC+8 (China Standard)

Changning (Chinese: 长凝镇; pinyin: Chángníng Zhèn) is a town located in Luannan County, Tangshan, Hebei, China. According to the 2010 census, Changning had a population of 34,476, including 17,460 males and 17,016 females. The population was distributed as follows: 4,915 people aged under 14, 25,795 people aged between 15 and 64, and 3,766 people aged over 65.

== See also ==
- List of township-level divisions of Hebei
