= Angezhuang =

Angezhuang 安各庄镇
- Town
- Āngèzhuāng Zhèn
- Location in Hebei Location in China
- Coordinates: 39°25′35″N 118°26′45″E
- Country: People's Republic of China
- Province: Hebei
- Prefecture-level city: Tangshan
- County: Luannan

Area
  - Total: 62.03 km^{2} (23.95 sq mi)

Population (2010)
  - Total: 25,457
  - Density: 410.4/km^{2} (1,063/sq mi)
- Time zone: UTC+8 (China Standard)

Angezhuang (Chinese: 安各庄镇; pinyin: Āngèzhuāng Zhèn) is a town located in Luannan County, Tangshan, Hebei, China. According to the 2010 census, Angezhuang had a population of 25,457, including 12,984 males and 12,473 females. The population was distributed as follows: 3,804 people aged under 14, 18,569 people aged between 15 and 64, and 3,084 people aged over 65.

== See also ==
- List of township-level divisions of Hebei
