= Liu Cunzhi =

- 刘存智

Acting Commander of Guangzhou Military Region
- In office May 1989 – June 1989
- Preceded by: Zhang Wannian
- Succeeded by: Zhu Dunfa

Personal details
- Born: 11 November 1924 Tongliao County, Liaoning, China
- Died: 22 October 2013 (aged 88) Guangzhou, Guangdong, China
- Party: Chinese Communist Party

Military service
- Allegiance: People's Republic of China
- Branch/service: People's Liberation Army Ground Force
- Years of service: 1937–2013
- Rank: Lieutenant general
- Battles/wars: Second Sino-Japanese War; Chinese Civil War; Korean War
- Awards: Order of Liberation (3rd Class); Order of Independence and Freedom (3rd Class)

Chinese name
- Simplified Chinese: 刘存智
- Traditional Chinese: 劉存智
Transcriptions
Standard Mandarin
- Hanyu Pinyin: Liú Cúnzhì

Liu Cunzhi (Chinese: 刘存智; 11 November 1924 – 22 October 2013) was a lieutenant general (zhongjiang) of the People's Liberation Army (PLA). He was a delegate to the 6th and 7th National People's Congress, and a member of the 8th National Committee of the Chinese People's Political Consultative Conference.

== Biography ==
Liu was born in Tongliao County, Liaoning, on 11 November 1924, while his ancestral home in Qingyun County, Shandong. He enlisted in the Eighth Route Army in 1937, and joined the Chinese Communist Party (CCP) in 1939. During the Second Sino-Japanese War, he joined an underground resistance movement in response to the ongoing occupation of China by the Empire of Japan. During the Chinese Civil War, he engaged in the Linjiang Campaign, Liaoshen campaign, and Pingjin campaign. During the Korean War, he was assigned to North Korea and fought under Peng Dehuai. In May 1989, he was named acting commander of Guangzhou Military Region while commander Zhang Wannian was ill. On 22 October 2013, he died from an illness in Guangzhou, Guangdong, aged 88.

== Personal life ==
His younger brother Liu Cunxin was also a lieutenant general (zhongjiang) of the People's Liberation Army (PLA).

Military offices
Preceded by Zhang Wannian	Acting Commander of Guangzhou Military Region; 1989	Succeeded by Zhu Dunfa
