= Tao Bojun =

- 陶伯钧

Commander of the Guangzhou Military Region
- In office 1996–2002
- Preceded by: Li Xilin
- Succeeded by: Liu Zhenwu

Personal details
- Born: 8 December 1937 Yongji County, Jilin, Manchukuo
- Died: 18 January 2009 (aged 71) Guangzhou, Guangdong, China
- Party: Chinese Communist Party
- Education: PLA 6th Artillery School

Military service
- Allegiance: People's Republic of China
- Branch/service: People's Liberation Army Ground Force
- Years of service: 1951–2009
- Rank: General
- Commands: Guangzhou Military Region
- Battles/wars: Sino-Vietnamese War

Chinese name
- Simplified Chinese: 陶伯钧
- Traditional Chinese: 陶伯鈞
Transcriptions
Standard Mandarin
- Hanyu Pinyin: Táo Bójūn

Tao Bojun (Chinese: 陶伯钧; 8 December 1937 – 18 January 2009) was a general in the People's Liberation Army of China who served as commander of the Guangzhou Military Region from 1996 to 2002.

He was a representative of the 13th and 14th National Congress of the Chinese Communist Party. He was a member of the 15th Central Committee of the Chinese Communist Party. He was a member of the Standing Committee of the 10th National People's Congress.

== Biography ==
Tao was born in Yongji County, Jilin, Manchukuo on 8 December 1937. He enlisted in the People's Liberation Army (PLA) in July 1951, and joined the Chinese Communist Party (CCP) in October 1961. He graduated from the PLA 6th Artillery School in 1955. He served in the Wuhan Military District for a long time and participated in the Sino-Vietnamese War. In 1985, he was appointed chief of staff of the Chengdu Military Region, he remained in that position until 1992, when he was transferred to Guangzhou and appointed chief of staff of the Guangzhou Military Region. In 1996, he was promoted to become commander, a position he held until 2002. During his term in office, he was responsible for the formation of the PLA garrisons in Hong Kong and Macao.

On 18 January 2009, he died from an illness in Guangzhou, Guangdong, at the age of 71.

He was promoted to the rank of major general (shaojiang) in September 1988, lieutenant general (zhongjiang) in June 1991, and general (shangjiang) in March 1998.

Military offices
Preceded by Yang Zengtong	Chief of Staff of the Chengdu Military Region; 1985–1992	Succeeded by Chen Xianhua
Preceded by Chen Xianhua	Chief of Staff of the Guangzhou Military Region; 1992–1993	Succeeded by Gong Gucheng
Preceded by Li Xilin	Commander of the Guangzhou Military Region; 1996–2002	Succeeded by Liu Zhenwu
