= Luannan County =

Luannan County 滦南县
- County
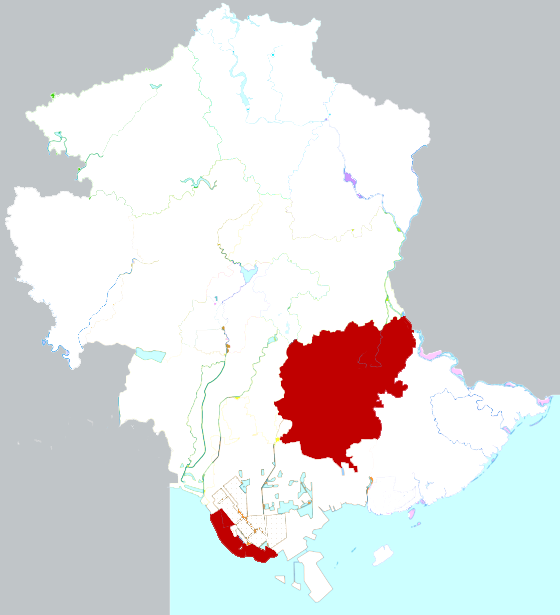
- Location in Tangshan

- Location of the seat in Hebei
- Coordinates: 39°30′N 118°42′E
- Country: People's Republic of China
- Province: Hebei
- Prefecture-level city: Tangshan

Area
  - Total: 1,482.6 km^{2} (572.4 sq mi)

Population (2020)
  - Total: 508,500
  - Density: 343.0/km^{2} (888.3/sq mi)
- Time zone: UTC+8 (China Standard)
- Website: www.luannan.gov.cn

Luannan County (simplified Chinese: 滦南县; traditional Chinese: 灤南縣; pinyin: Luánnán Xiàn) is a county in the east of Hebei province, China. It is under the administration of the prefecture-level city of Tangshan. Luannan County spans an area of 1,482.6 square kilometres (572.4 mi^{2}), and has a population of approximately 508,500, per the 2020 Chinese census.

== Toponymy ==
Luannan County is named such because it is south (Chinese: 南; pinyin: nán) of nearby Luanzhou (simplified Chinese: 滦州市; traditional Chinese: 灤州市; pinyin: Luánzhōu Shì).

== History ==
The region of present-day Luannan County has been inhabited since the Neolithic period.

The area's organizational history dates back to the 740 CE, during the Tang dynasty when the area was incorporated as Macheng County (simplified Chinese: 马城县; traditional Chinese: 馬城縣; pinyin: Mǎchéng Xiàn). The seat of Macheng County was located in the present-day town of Bencheng.

During the Liao dynasty, the area belonged to the Lulong Commandery (simplified Chinese: 卢龙郡; traditional Chinese: 盧龍郡; pinyin: Lúlóng Jùn). In the subsequent Jin dynasty, it was placed under Luan County (simplified Chinese: 滦县; traditional Chinese: 灤縣; pinyin: Luán Xiàn). Early in the Yuan dynasty, it was merged into Luanzhou. It remained as part of Luanzhou throughout the Ming dynasty, Qing dynasty, and during the period of the Republic of China.

Luannan County was first established in May 1946, formed out of the southern portion of Luan County (now known as Luanzhou). The county was abolished in 1954, and split among surrounding county-level divisions. This was undone in January 1963, restoring Luannan County.

== Geography ==
Luannan County spans an area of 1,482.6 square kilometres (572.4 mi^{2}). It has a coastline of 29.63 kilometres (18.41 mi), alongside the Bohai Bay. The Luan River runs through the county. The county's elevation is relatively flat, as it is part of an alluvial plain. However, it is higher in the northern portions.

=== Climate ===
Climate data for Luannan, elevation 18 m (59 ft), (1991–2020 normals, extremes 1981–2025)
Month	Jan	Feb	Mar	Apr	May	Jun	Jul	Aug	Sep	Oct	Nov	Dec	Year
Record high °C (°F)	12.6 (54.7)	19.5 (67.1)	28.2 (82.8)	31.2 (88.2)	36.7 (98.1)	37.9 (100.2)	39.6 (103.3)	34.9 (94.8)	34.8 (94.6)	31.3 (88.3)	21.5 (70.7)	12.4 (54.3)	39.6 (103.3)
Mean daily maximum °C (°F)	1.2 (34.2)	4.9 (40.8)	11.5 (52.7)	19.3 (66.7)	25.4 (77.7)	28.6 (83.5)	30.3 (86.5)	29.9 (85.8)	26.4 (79.5)	19.2 (66.6)	9.9 (49.8)	2.8 (37.0)	17.5 (63.4)
Daily mean °C (°F)	−4.8 (23.4)	−1.4 (29.5)	5.1 (41.2)	12.9 (55.2)	19.2 (66.6)	23.2 (73.8)	25.8 (78.4)	25.1 (77.2)	20.5 (68.9)	13.0 (55.4)	4.2 (39.6)	−2.6 (27.3)	11.7 (53.0)
Mean daily minimum °C (°F)	−9.4 (15.1)	−6.2 (20.8)	−0.1 (31.8)	7.3 (45.1)	13.6 (56.5)	18.5 (65.3)	22.1 (71.8)	21.2 (70.2)	15.7 (60.3)	8.0 (46.4)	−0.3 (31.5)	−6.8 (19.8)	7.0 (44.5)
Record low °C (°F)	−20.8 (−5.4)	−19.9 (−3.8)	−10.7 (12.7)	−2.9 (26.8)	5.1 (41.2)	9.5 (49.1)	16.3 (61.3)	12.8 (55.0)	5.0 (41.0)	−3.2 (26.2)	−12.4 (9.7)	−20.5 (−4.9)	−20.8 (−5.4)
Average precipitation mm (inches)	2.6 (0.10)	4.8 (0.19)	6.9 (0.27)	23.8 (0.94)	46.0 (1.81)	85.8 (3.38)	161.5 (6.36)	147.0 (5.79)	46.3 (1.82)	31.7 (1.25)	11.7 (0.46)	4.0 (0.16)	572.1 (22.53)
Average precipitation days (≥ 0.1 mm)	1.8	2.3	3.0	5.1	7.0	9.3	11.1	9.7	6.3	4.7	3.1	2.7	66.1
Average snowy days	3.4	3.1	1.2	0.3	0	0	0	0	0	0	1.9	3.3	13.2
Average relative humidity (%)	56	57	54	53	58	70	80	81	73	66	63	60	64
Mean monthly sunshine hours	183.5	186.3	233.0	248.3	272.1	231.7	200.7	215.8	224.6	209.3	174.1	171.2	2,550.6
Percentage possible sunshine	61	61	63	62	61	52	45	51	61	61	59	59	58
Source: China Meteorological Administration October all-time Record

== Administrative divisions ==
Luannan County administers 1 subdistrict and 16 towns.

The county's sole subdistrict is Youyi Road Subdistrict.

The county administers the towns of Bencheng, Songdaokou, Changning, Hugezhuang, Tuoli, Yaowangzhuang, Sigezhuang, Angezhuang, Bachigang, Chengzhuang, Qingtuoying, Baigezhuang, Nanbao, Fanggezhuang, Donghuangtuo, and Macheng.

== Demographics ==
Luannan County has a population of approximately 508,500 people, as per the 2020 Chinese census. A 2012 estimate put the county's population at about 570,000. The county's population totaled 584,518 per the 2010 Chinese census. The county's population in 2002 was approximately 540,400, per an estimate. The 2000 Chinese census recorded Luannan County's population at 570,535. A 1996 estimate put the county's population at about 533,000.

== Economy ==
The county has a significant iron mining industry. Luannan County is home to Macheng Iron Mine (Chinese: 马城铁矿; pinyin: Mǎchéng Tiě Kuàng), a major mine operated by the Shougang Group. The county also produces a significant amount of steel shovels, accounting for 85% of the domestic steel shovel market, and 90% of exported steel shovels from China.

Luannan County also has sizeable agriculture and aquaculture industries. Per a 2024 county government publication, it has 1.08 million mu of cultivated land. Major crops grown in Luannan County include rice, Carex kobomugi, and peanuts. Common livestock in Luannan County include dairy cows, chickens, and pigs.

== Transportation ==
The Qian–Cao Railway passes through Luannan County. Major expressways which run through Luannan County include the G0111 Qinhuangdao–Binzhou Expressway and the S64 Tang–Gang Expressway.

== Notable people ==
- Cheng Zhaocai, Ping opera playwright
- Jin Wenran, drummer
