= Zhu Dunfa =

Chinese general and politician (1927–2021)

- 朱敦法

President of PLA National Defence University
- In office November 1992 – July 1995
- Preceded by: Zhang Zhen
- Succeeded by: Xing Shizhong

Commander of Guangzhou Military Region
- In office April 1990 – October 1992
- Preceded by: Liu Cunzhi
- Succeeded by: Li Xilin

Personal details
- Born: 28 December 1927 Pei County, Jiangsu, China
- Died: 21 July 2021 (aged 93) Beijing, China
- Party: Chinese Communist Party
- Education: PLA Military Academy

Military service
- Allegiance: People's Republic of China
- Branch/service: People's Liberation Army Ground Force
- Years of service: 1939–2021
- Rank: General
- Unit: 16th Group Army
- Battles/wars: Chinese Civil War; Korean War
- Awards: Order of Liberation (3rd Class)

Zhu Dunfa (Chinese: 朱敦法; pinyin: Zhū Dūnfǎ; 28 December 1927 – 21 July 2021) was a general (shangjiang) of the People's Liberation Army (PLA). He was a delegate to the 6th and 7th National People's Congress, and a member of the 14th Central Committee of the Chinese Communist Party.

== Biography ==
Zhu was born in Pei County, Jiangsu, on 28 December 1927. He enlisted in the Eighth Route Army in 1939, and joined the Chinese Communist Party (CCP) in 1945.

During the Chinese Civil War, he served in the war and engaged in the Battle of North Henan, the Huaihai campaign, and the Yangtze River Crossing campaign.

In 1953, he was assigned North Korea with the 16th Group Army and fought under Peng Dehuai at the Korean War. He returned to China in 1958. In 1985, he was made deputy commander of Shenyang Military Region. In April 1990, he was promoted to commander of Guangzhou Military Region, he remained in that position until October 1992, when he was commissioned as president of PLA National Defence University.

On 21 July 2021, he died from an illness in Beijing, at the age of 93.

He was promoted to the rank of lieutenant general (zhongjiang) in 1988 and general (shangjiang) in 1993.

Military offices
Preceded by Liu Cunzhi	Commander of Guangzhou Military Region; 1990–1992	Succeeded by Li Xilin
Educational offices
Preceded by Zhang Zhen	President of PLA National Defence University; 1992–1995	Succeeded by Xing Shizhong
