= Guangzhou Military Region =

Former military region of China

- Guangzhou Military Region (highlighted)
- Simplified Chinese: 广州军区
- Traditional Chinese: 廣州軍區
Transcriptions
Standard Mandarin
- Hanyu Pinyin: Guǎngzhōu Jūnqū
Yue: Cantonese
- Yale Romanization: Gwóngjāu Gwānkēui
- Jyutping: Gwong^{2}zau^{1} Gwan^{1}keoi^{1}

The Guangzhou Military Region was from 1955 to 2016 one of the People's Liberation Army PLA Military Regions, located in the south of the People's Republic of China. In May 1949, the Central China (Hua Zhong) Military Region (MR) was formed. In March 1955, it was divided into two, the Guangzhou MR and the Wuhan Military Region. When the Wuhan MR was disbanded in August 1985, its troops stationed around the Hubei province were assigned to the Guangzhou MR.

The region was disestablished in 2016 and reorganised as the Southern Theater Command and Central Theater Command.

Just before being disbanded, the Guangzhou MR controlled the Guangdong Province, Guangxi Autonomous Region, Hunan Province, Hubei Province, and the Hainan Province Military Districts. The Hong Kong and Macau garrisons were within the Guangzhou MR area but reported directly to the Central Military Commission.

There were two Group Armies within the Region, the 41st Group Army and 42nd Group Army, and in 2006 the International Institute for Strategic Studies said the region had some 180,000 personnel, one mechanised division, three motorised infantry divisions, one artillery division, two armoured brigades, one artillery brigade, and two anti-aircraft brigades. The 123rd (Amphibious) Infantry Division (53023) at Guigang/Guangxi and 124th Infantry Divisions at Boluo, Guangdong had been identified as Rapid Reaction Units. The Hong Kong garrison includes a brigade with a helicopter unit.

The PLA's 15th Airborne Corps was also located in this MR though not under its command.

The PLA's first cyber blue team was established in the region in May 2011 to test regular PLA unit's cyber defenses.

== List of commanders ==
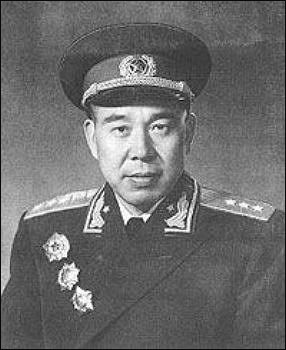
Huang Yongsheng

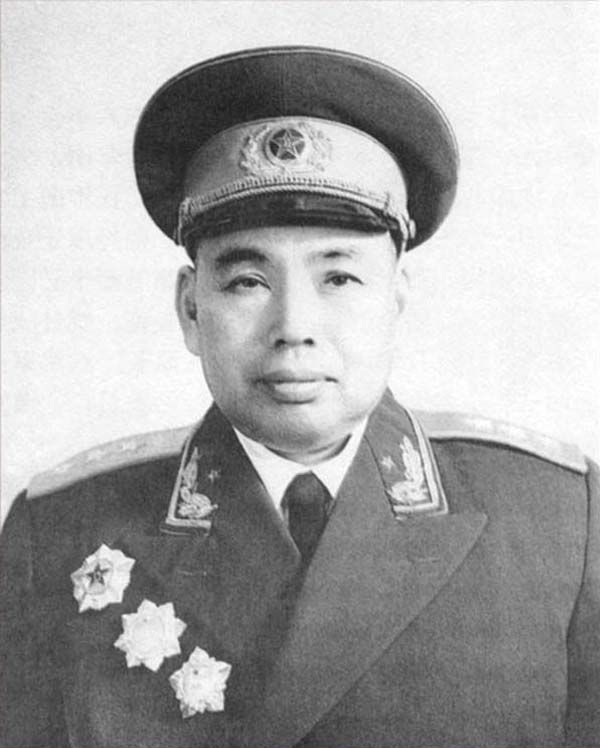
Xu Shiyou

- Huang Yongsheng, 1955−68
- Li Tianyou
- Ding Sheng
- Xu Shiyou, 1973−80
- Wu Kehua, 1980−82
- You Taizhong, 1982−87
- Zhang Wannian
- Liu Cunzhi
- Zhu Dunfa
- Li Xilin
- Tao Bojun
- Liu Zhenwu
- Zhang Qinsheng, 2007−09
- Xu Fenlin, 2009−2016

== Ground Forces ==
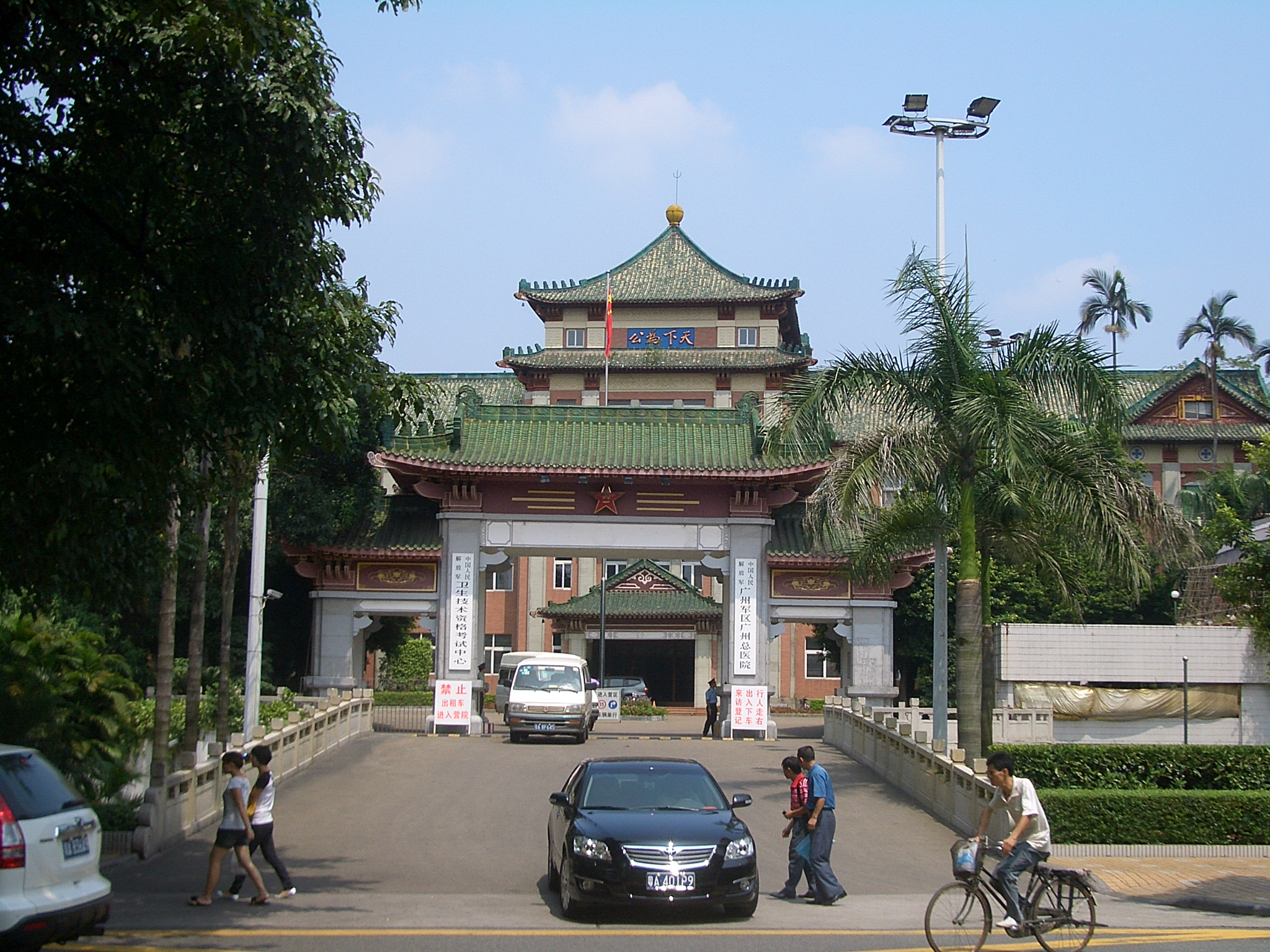
The Main Guangzhou Hospital in the Guangzhou Military Region

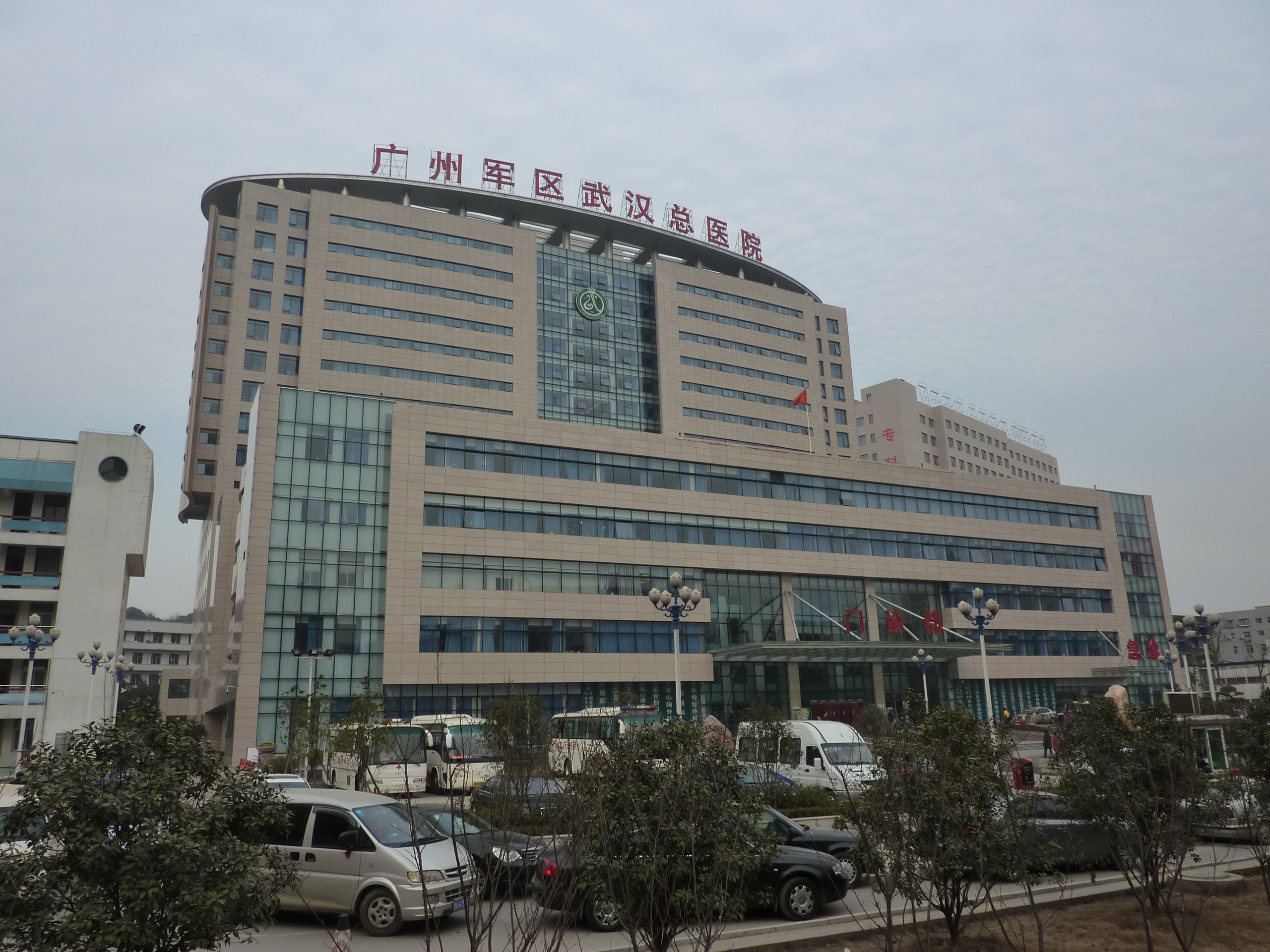
The Main Wuhan Hospital in the Guangzhou Military Region

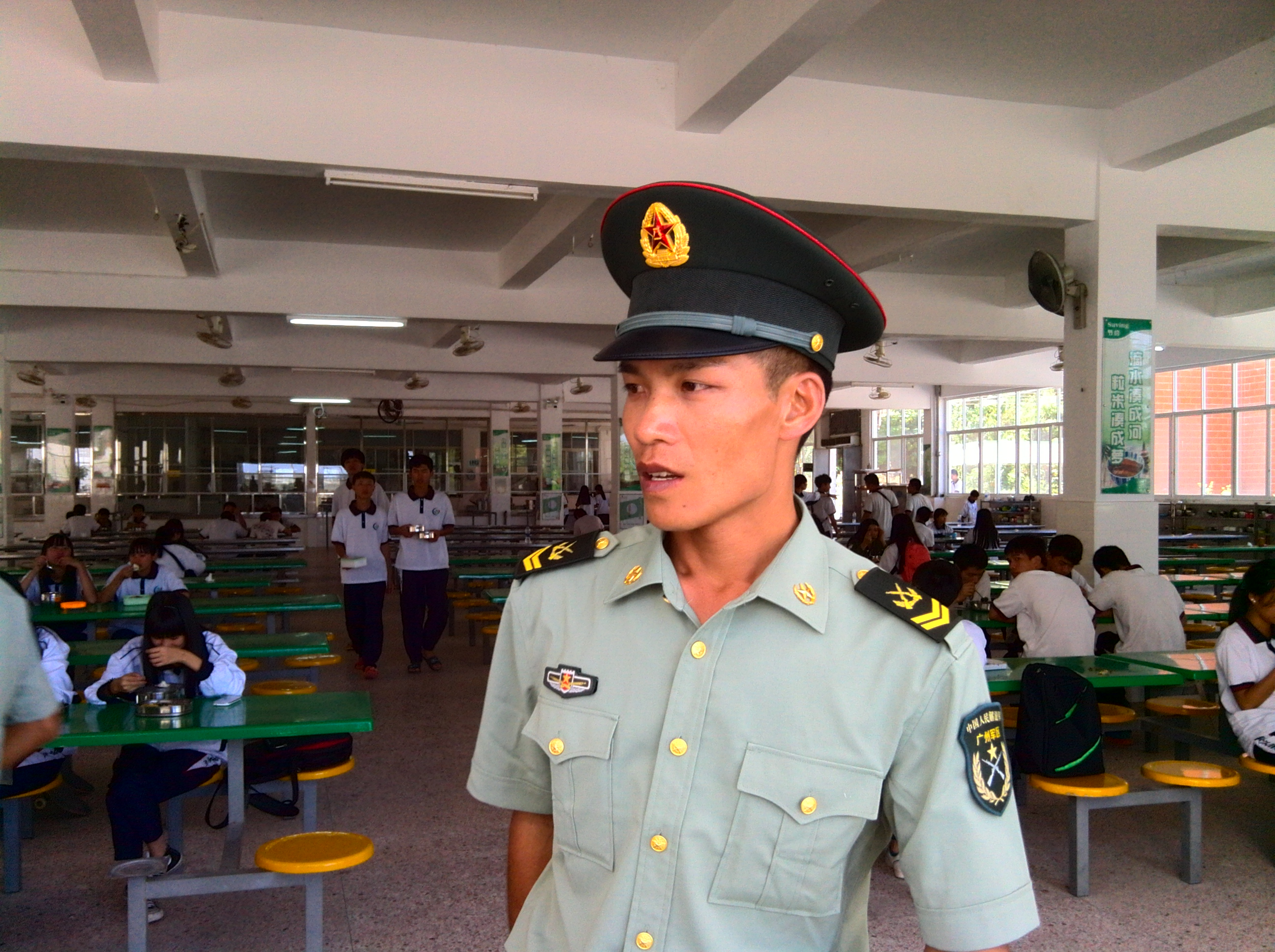
A Sergeant in Guangzhou MR, in canteen in Chaozhou Vocational Technical School

- 41st Group Army (Command Center:Liuzhou) consists of 2 divisions and 3 brigades
  - 121st Mechanized Infantry Division(Liuzhou)
  - 123rd Mechanized Infantry Division(Guigang)
  - Armored Brigade(Guilin)
  - Anti-Aircraft Brigade (Hengyang)
  - Artillery Brigade(Liuzhou)
- 42nd Group Army (Command Center:Huizhou) consists of 2 divisions and 4 brigades
  - 124th Amphibious Mechanized Infantry Division (Boluo)
  - 163rd Mechanized Infantry Division(Chaozhou)
  - Anti-Aircraft Brigade (Jieyang)
  - Special Operation Battalion(Guangzhou)
  - Electronic Warfare Regiment(Huadu)
  - 6th Regiment of the Army Aviation(Sanshui)
  - Engineering Regiment(Huizhou)
  - Anti-Chemical Warfare Regiment(Shenzhen)
  - Driver and Medic Training Battalion(Dongguan)
  - Training Regiment(Huizhou)

== Air Force ==
Commander:Lt. Gen. Han Ruijie Political Officer: Lt. Gen. Wang Jilian Deputy Commander:Maj. Gen. Zhang Shutian

In June 1962, the second Shantou Command Post became the 7th Air Corps. After a move to Xingning in Guangdong Province, it moved to Nanning, Guangxi Autonomous Region, in August 1964.

The 48th Aviation Division was active, initially under the 12th Air Corps, from 1971 to 1992.

- 7th Air Corps
  - 2nd Fighter Division: Suixi, Liuzhou Su-27, J-7
  - 9th (Fighter) Division : Foshan, Shaoguan, Guangzhou, Xingning J-8D, J-7B, J-10
  - 42nd (Fighter) Division : Nanning, Ningming, Guilin J-10
- Air Force in Wuhan Base
  - 13th (Transport) Division : Wangjiadun AirportHankou, Dangyang, Kaifeng Y-7, Y-8, IL-76
  - 18 (Fighter) Division : Changsha, Hengyang J-8D, J-7, Su-30
  - 8th (Bomber) Division : Leiyang, Qidong H-6, H-6U
- 15th Airborne Corps
  - 43rd Airborne Division:Kaifeng, Henan
  - 44th Airborne Division Guangshui, Hubei
  - 45th Airborne Division Huangpi, Hubei

== Nickname ==
Organizations affiliated with the Guangzhou Military Region often used the nickname "warrior" (Chinese: 战士; pinyin: zhànshì; lit. 'battle person'), including the Warrior Performance Troupe (Chinese: 战士文工团) and the Warrior Newspaper (Chinese: 战士报).
