= Governor of Heilongjiang =

Governor of the Heilongjiang Provincial People's Government
- 黑龙江省人民政府省长
- National Emblem of China

- Flag of China

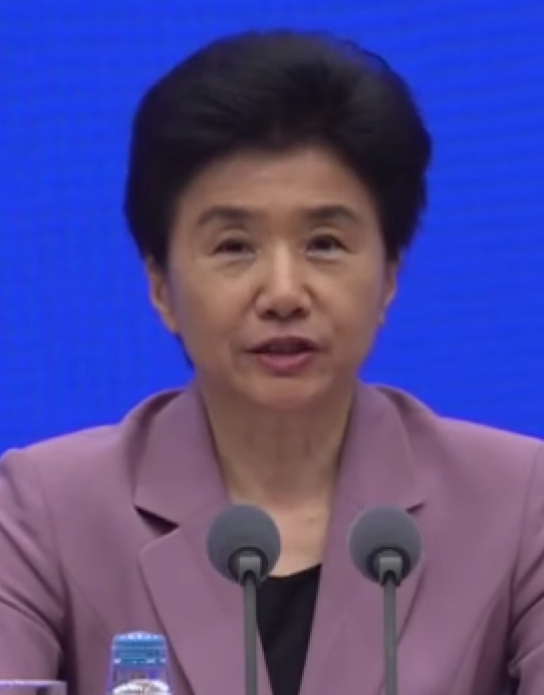
- Incumbent; Liang Huiling since 9 December 2022
- Heilongjiang Provincial People's Government
- Type: Governor
- Status: Provincial and ministerial-level official
- Reports to: Heilongjiang Provincial People's Congress and its Standing Committee
- Nominator: Presidium of the Heilongjiang Provincial People's Congress
- Appointer: Heilongjiang Provincial People's Congress
- Term length: Five years, renewable
- Inaugural holder: Yu Yifu
- Formation: September 1950
- Deputy: Deputy Governors; Secretary-General

The governor of Heilongjiang, officially the Governor of the Heilongjiang Provincial People's Government, is the head of Liaoning Province and leader of the Heilongjiang Provincial People's Government.

The governor is elected by the Liaoning Provincial People's Congress, and responsible to it and its Standing Committee. The governor is a provincial level official and is responsible for the overall decision-making of the provincial government. The governor is assisted by an executive vice governor as well as several vice governors. The governor generally serves as the deputy secretary of the Liaoning Provincial Committee of the Chinese Communist Party and as a member of the CCP Central Committee. The governor is the second highest-ranking official in the province after the secretary of the CCP Liaoning Committee. The current governor is Liang Huiling, who took office on 9 December 2022.

== List of governors ==
=== People's Republic of China ===
No.	Officeholder	Term of office		Party	Ref.
No.	Officeholder	Took office	Left office	Party	Ref.
Governor of the Heilongjiang Provincial People's Government
1	Yu Yifu (1903–1982)	September 1950	November 1952	Chinese Communist Party	
2	Zhao Dezun (1913–2012)	November 1952	December 1953	Chinese Communist Party	
3	Chen Lei (1917–2006)	December 1953	August 1954	Chinese Communist Party	
4	Han Guang (1912–2008)	August 1954	November 1955	Chinese Communist Party	
Governor of the Heilongjiang Provincial People's Committee
(4)	Han Guang (1912–2008)	November 1955	July 1956	Chinese Communist Party	
5	Ouyang Qin (1900–1978)	July 1956	August 1958	Chinese Communist Party	
6	Li Fanwu (1912–1986)	August 1958	March 1967	Chinese Communist Party	
Director of the Heilongjiang Revolutionary Committee
7	Pan Fusheng (1908–1980)	March 1967	August 1971	Chinese Communist Party	
8	Wang Jiadao (1916–1992)	August 1971	December 1974	Chinese Communist Party	
9	Liu Guangtao (1920–2011)	December 1974	December 1977	Chinese Communist Party	
10	Yang Yichen (1914–1997)	December 1977	December 1979	Chinese Communist Party	
Governor of the Heilongjiang Provincial People's Government
11	Chen Lei (1917–2006)	December 1979	May 1985	Chinese Communist Party	
12	Hou Jie (1931–2000)	May 1985	March 1989	Chinese Communist Party	
13	Shao Qihui (1934–2026)	March 1989	May 1994	Chinese Communist Party	
14	Tian Fengshan (born 1940)	May 1994	January 2000	Chinese Communist Party	
15	Song Fatang (born 1940)	January 2000	March 2003	Chinese Communist Party	
16	Zhang Zuoji (1945–2021)	31 March 2003	25 December 2007	Chinese Communist Party	
17	Li Zhanshu (born 1951)	27 January 2008	27 August 2010	Chinese Communist Party	
18	Wang Xiankui (born 1952)	27 August 2010	25 March 2013	Chinese Communist Party	
19	Lu Hao (born 1967)	25 March 2013	26 March 2018	Chinese Communist Party	
20	Wang Wentao (born 1964)	26 March 2018	24 December 2020	Chinese Communist Party	
21	Hu Changsheng (born 1963)	22 February 2021	9 December 2022	Chinese Communist Party	
22	Liang Huiling (born 1962)	9 December 2022	Incumbent	Chinese Communist Party	
