= Heilongjiang Revolutionary Committee =

Cultural Revolution provincial governing body

Overview
- Type: Provincial revolutionary committee
- Elected by: State Council (de facto); Heilongjiang Provincial People's Congress (suspended)

History
- Established: 1967
- Disbanded: December 1979

Leadership
- Chairman: Yang Yichen (final)

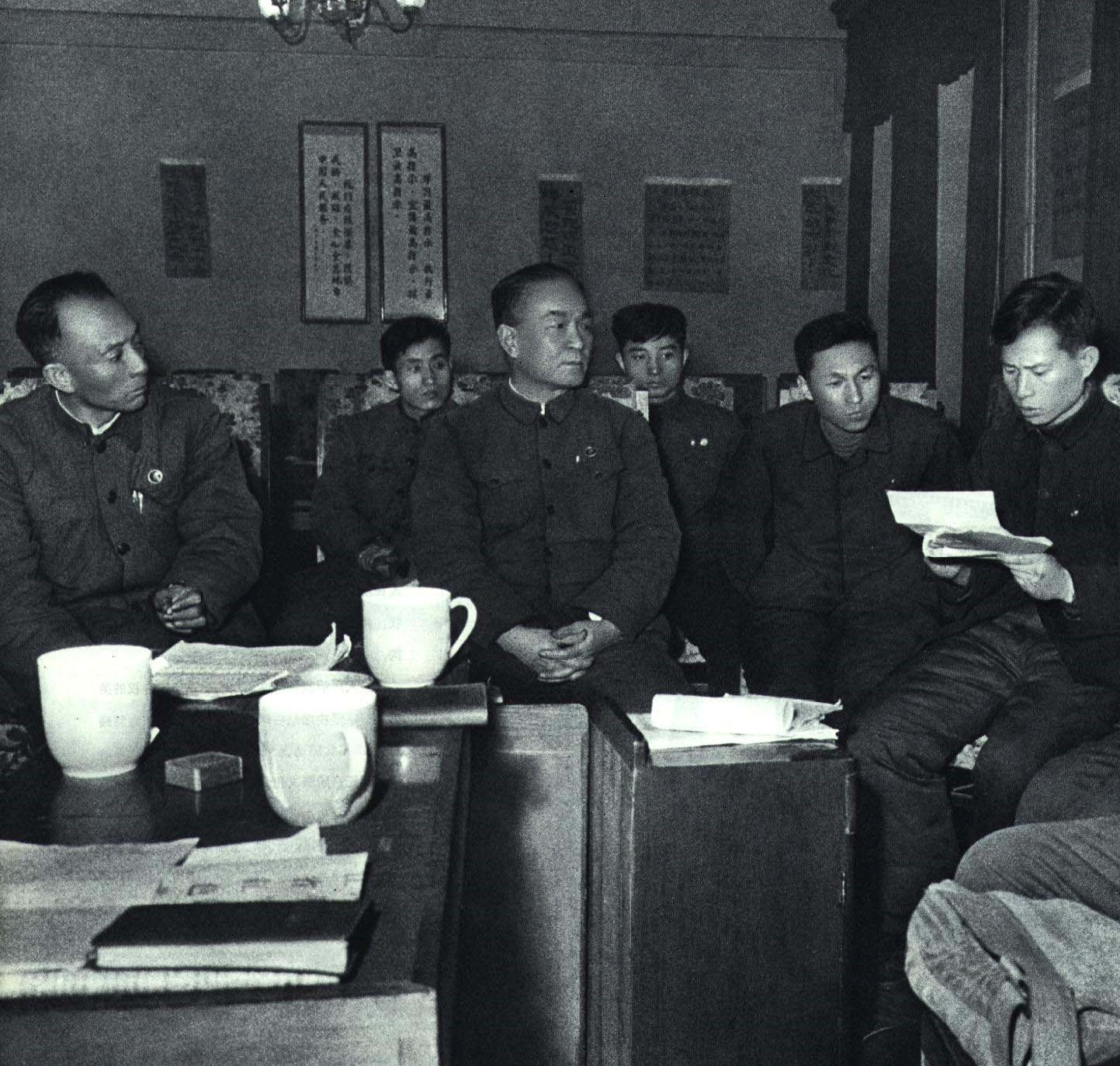
Heilongjiang Revolutionary Committee after the seizure of power in 1967

The Heilongjiang Revolutionary Committee was a revolutionary committee that had administered Heilongjiang province, People's Republic of China between 1967 and 1979.

== History ==
After the beginning of the Cultural Revolution, the government of Heilongjiang was constantly attacked by the Red Guards, especially the rebels, and many leaders were criticized by the Red Guards, paralyzing the government.

On January 31, 1967, the Red Guards in Heilongjiang gathered and announced the establishment of the Revolutionary Committee of Red Revolts. On February 2, the People's Daily and the People's Liberation Army Daily published a joint statement entitled with "A New Dawn on the Eastern Horizon" congratulating the establishment of the new governing body. On March 23, it was announced that the name changed to Heilongjiang Revolutionary Committee. Pan Fusheng and Wang Jiadao served as the director and first-deputy director. By May 31, 1968, all 82 people's committees at all levels in Heilongjiang Province, including prefectures, cities, special districts, and counties, had been seized of their powers and revolutionary committees established.

After the establishment of the Heilongjiang Revolutionary Committee, around the question of who was in power, the rebels split into two rival organizations: those who opposed the entry of Zhao Qufei, a former member of the Provincial Party Committee, into the leadership of the Revolutionary Committee, formed the "Harbin Bombardment Liaison Station" ("Bombardment Faction"). The other side was the "Joint Command for Defending the Revolution in Three Combinations" ("Command Faction"), which was supported by Pan Fusheng to fight against the "Bombardment Faction" at the Harbin Institute of Technology and some rebel leaders in the former provincial party committee organs. The factional struggles later developed into the use of tanks and armored vehicles, etc. From June to October 1967, several large-scale fights between the two factions in Harbin resulted in the deaths of 20 people, injuries to more than 240 people, and the disabling of more than 50 people. In Jixi City in May of the same year, a two-faction fight resulted in nine deaths and 44 serious injuries. In Tangyuan County, there were 10 fights between the two factions, resulting in 24 deaths, more than 340 injuries and 4 disabilities.

In September 1967, Zhou Enlai, Premier of the State Council of the People's Republic of China, summoned representatives of the "Command Faction" and the "Bombardment Faction" to Beijing for negotiations, and in December, the "Twelve Agreements" were signed to attempt to form a grand coalition. However, due to Pan Fusheng's insistence on centralization of power, the grand coalition could not be achieved; in 1968, Pan Fusheng suggested that there were "secret agents tripping over his feet" in Heilongjiang Province, and demanded that "we dig up the ground three feet and find out the class enemies below the horizon". More than 1,200 people were arrested for the "counter-revolutionary class revenge cases," and more than 29,000 "escaped capitalist roaders" were arrested too, involving as many as 50,000 cadres. On February 4, 1969, Pan Fusheng announced the discovery of the "Treason Group" at an expanded meeting of the Heilongjiang Revolutionary Committee, and branded Ouyang Qin, Li Fanwu, Chen Lei and 12 others as the main members of the "Treason Group"; 168 leading cadres at all levels in 10 provinces and cities were affected. More than 80,000 cases of injustice and more than 4,000 unnatural deaths were caused throughout the province.

The institutional setup of the Heilongjiang Revolutionary Committee was not sound at the time of its creation. Pan Fusheng and Wang Jiadao, in their names, sent a telegram to the Central Committee of the Chinese Communist Party on February 8, 1968, requesting the formation of the Chinese Communist Party (CCP) Heilongjiang Core Group, with Pan and Wang nominating themselves as the head and deputy head of the group. on January 16, 1969, the first meeting of the CCP Heilongjiang Core Group was held under the chairmanship of Pan Fusheng, and since then, applications for membership of the Party in the districts, municipalities, counties, and large-scale factories, enterprises, higher education institutes and scientific research institutes have been approved one after the other. On March 28, 1970, the Central Committee replied to the Heilongjiang Core Group, approving the addition of Liu Guangtao (the second political commissar of the provincial military district) as the deputy head of the Core Group of the Provincial Revolutionary Committee. On May 26, the Central Committee approved the appointment of Pan Fusheng as the head of the Core Group of the CCP Heilongjiang Revolutionary Committee.

After the end of the North China Rectification Conference chaired by Zhou Enlai, he sent someone to Heilongjiang Province in February to deal with the issue of Pan Fusheng. From March 16 to June 6, the Core Group of the CCP Heilongjiang Revolutionary Committee held a meeting of party members and cadres at the county level and above in order to expose and criticize the issue of Pan Fusheng. In August 1971, the Third Representative Assembly of the CCP Heilongjiang Province was held, and the CCP Heilongjiang Provincial Committee was reorganized, with its offices still located in the Provincial Revolutionary Committee. In June 1973, the offices of the CCP Heilongjiang Provincial Committee were set aside from the Provincial Revolutionary Committee.

After the fall of the Gang of Four, the Revolutionary Committee continued to use the name, but its composition had changed fundamentally: the rebels were gradually purged, and the institutional setup of the Provincial Revolutionary Committee was restored to the same state as that of the Heilongjiang Provincial People's Committee prior to the Cultural Revolution. From December 21 to 26, 1979, the Second Session of the Fifth People's Congress of Heilongjiang Province decided to abolish the Heilongjiang Revolutionary Committee and restore the Heilongjiang Provincial People's Government.

== Leadership ==
Composition of the Revolutionary Committee of Heilongjiang Province:

- March 1967– August 1971
  - Director: Pan Fusheng (March 1967-August 1971)
  - Deputy Directors: Wang Jiadao (March 1967-August 1971), Liu Guangtao (1970-August 1971), Fu Kuiqing (1970-August 1971), Zhang Linchi (1970-August 1971), Yu Jie (1970-August 1971), Xia Guangya (1970-August 1971), Su Min (1970-August 1971), Liu Sicong (1970-August 1971), Xie Changhua (1970-August 1971), Zhang Chunhe (1970-August 1971), Zhang Beizhi (1970-August 1971), Cao Zhi (1970-August 1971), Nie Shirong (1970-August 1971), Tang Jinzhi (1970-August 1971), Ma Zhancun (1970-August 1971), Song Zhenye (1970-August 1971)
- August 1971– February 1977
  - Director: Wang Jiadao
  - Deputy Directors: Liu Guangtao, Fu Kuiqing, Yu Jie, Zhang Linchi, Su Min, Xia Guangya, Zhang Chunhe, Xie Changhua, Zhang Beizhi, Cao Zhi, Liu Sicong, Ceng Jinzhi, Nie Shirong, Song Zhenye, Ma Zhanchun, Ren Zhongyi, Wang Yilun, Yang Yi Chen
- February 1977– December 1977
  - Director: Liu Guangtao
  - Deputy Directors: Fu Kuiqing, Zhang Linchi, Ren Zhongyi, Yang Yichen, Wang Yilun, Su Min, Xia Guangya, Zhang Chunhe, Xie Changhua, Cao Zhi, Liu Sicong, Tang Jingui, Nie Shirong, Song Zhenye, Ma Zhanchun
- December 1977– January 1978 (elected at the First Session of the Fifth Heilongjiang Provincial People's Congress in December 1977)
  - Director: Yang Yichen
  - Deputy Directors: Zhang Linchi, Wang Yilun, Zhang Chunhe, Xie Changhua, Liu Sicong, Tang Jinzhi, Nie Shirong, Song Zhenye, Ma Zhanchun
- January 1978 – December 1979
  - Director: Yang Yichen
  - Deputy Directors: Chen Lei, Chen Jianfei, Yu Hongliang, Guan Zhou, Zhang Shijun, Wang Weiwen, Hou Jie, Ruan Yongsheng, Sun Ziyuan, Lu Guang, Wang Jinzi, Wang Zhao (served since August 1978), Zhao Dezun, Wang Luming, Xie Yunqing (served since April 1979)
