= Members of the 11th Central Committee of the Chinese Communist Party =

The 11th Central Committee of the Chinese Communist Party was elected by the 11th National Congress in 1977. 222 individuals served as members during this electoral term.

== Members ==
Members of the 11th Central Committee of the Chinese Communist Party
Name		10th CC	12th CC	Birth	PM	Death	Birthplace	Ethnicity	Gender	Ref.
An Pingsheng	安平生	Member	Member	1917	1937	1999	Shaanxi	Han	Male	
An Ziwen (Note: An Ziwen was added to the Central Committee as a member by a decision of the 4th Plenary Session, held on 25–28 September 1979. He died of natural causes on 25 June 1980.)	安子文	Nonmember	Nonmember	1909	1927	1980	Shaanxi	Han	Male	
Bai Dongcai	白栋材	Alternate	Member	1916	1935	2014	Shaanxi	Han	Male	
Bai Rubing	白如冰	Member	Nonmember	1912	1928	1994	Shaanxi	Han	Male	
Bao Riledai	宝日勒岱	Nonmember	Nonmember	1938	1958	Alive	Inner Mongolia	Mongolian	Female	
Basang	巴桑	Member	Member	1937	1959	Alive	Tibet	Tibetan	Female	
Bo Yibo (Note: Bo Yibo was added to the Central Committee as a member by a decision of the 4th Plenary Session, held on 25–28 September 1979.)	薄一波	Nonmember	Nonmember	1908	1925	2007	Shanxi	Han	Male	
Cai Chang	蔡畅	Member	Nonmember	1900	1923	1990	Hunan	Han	Female	
Cai Xiao	蔡啸	Member	Nonmember	1919	1939	1990	Taiwan	Han	Male	
Cao Lihuai	曹里怀	Member	Nonmember	1909	1928	1998	Hunan	Han	Male	
Cao Yiou (Note: Cao Yiou was removed from the Central Committee at an undisclosed date.)	曹轶欧	Nonmember	Nonmember	1903	1926	1989	Beijing	Han	Female	
Chen Fuhan	陈福汉	Nonmember	Member	1936	1959	Alive	Tianjin	Han	Male	
Chen Guodong	陈国栋	Nonmember	Member	1911	1932	2005	Jiangxi	Han	Male	
Chen Muhua	陈慕华	Member	Member	1921	1938	2011	Zhejiang	Han	Female	
Chen Pixian	陈丕显	Nonmember	Member	1916	1931	1995	Fujian	Han	Male	
Chen Puru	陈璞如	Nonmember	Member	1918	1932	1998	Shandong	Han	Male	
Chen Qihan (Note: Chen Qihan died of natural causes on 19 June 1981.)	陈奇涵	Member	Nonmember	1897	1925	1981	Jiangxi	Han	Male	
Chen Weida	陈伟达	Nonmember	Member	1916	1937	1990	Jiangsu	Han	Male	
Chen Xilian	陈锡联	Member	Nonmember	1915	1930	1999	Hubei	Han	Male	
Chen Yonggui	陈永贵	Member	Nonmember	1914	1948	1986	Shanxi	Han	Male	
Chen Yun	陈云	Member	Member	1905	1925	1995	Shanghai	Han	Male	
Chen Zaidao (Note: Chen Zaidao was added to the Central Committee as a member by a decision of the 3rd Plenary Session, held on 18–22 December 1978.)	陈再道	Nonmember	Nonmember	1909	1928	1993	Hubei	Han	Male	
Cheng Zihua	程子华	Nonmember	Nonmember	1905	1926	1991	Shanxi	Han	Male	
Chi Biqing	池必卿	Nonmember	Member	1918	1937	2007	Shanxi	Han	Male	
Chu Jiang	储江	Nonmember	Nonmember	1917	1938	2011	Jiangsu	Han	Male	
Dai Guangqian	戴光前	Nonmember	Nonmember	1934	1955	Alive	Guangdong	Han	Male	
Deng Xiaoping	邓小平	Member	Member	1904	1924	1997	Sichuan	Han	Male	
Deng Yingchao	邓颖超	Member	Member	1904	1924	1992	Guangxi	Han	Female	
Ding Guoyu	丁国钰	Member	Nonmember	1916	1933	2015	Anhui	Han	Male	
Ding Keze	丁可则	Member	Nonmember	1933	1954	2017	Jiangsu	Han	Male	
Du Yide	杜义德	Nonmember	Nonmember	1912	1930	2009	Hubei	Han	Male	
Duan Junyi	段君毅	Member	Nonmember	1910	1936	2004	Henan	Han	Male	
Fan Deling (Note: Fan Deling was removed from the Central Committee at an undisclosed date.)	樊德玲	Member	Nonmember	1933	1960	1999	Hebei	Han	Male	
Fang Yi	方毅	Member	Member	1916	1931	1997	Fujian	Han	Male	
Feng Xuan	冯铉	Member	Nonmember	1915	1936	1986	Jiangsu	Han	Male	
Geng Biao	耿飚	Member	Nonmember	1909	1928	2000	Hunan	Han	Male	
Geng Qichang (Note: Geng Qichang was removed from the Central Committee at an undisclosed date.)	耿起昌	Member	Nonmember	1915	1938	1991	Shanxi	Han	Male	
Gu Mu	谷牧	Member	Member	1914	1932	2009	Shandong	Han	Male	
Guo Moruo (Note: Guo Moruo died of natural causes on 12 June 1978.)	郭沫若	Member	Nonmember	1892	1927	1978	Sichuan	Han	Male	
Guo Yufeng (Note: Guo Yufeng was removed from the Central Committee at an undisclosed date.)	郭玉峰	Member	Nonmember	1918	1938	2000	Hebei	Han	Male	
Han Guang (Note: Han Guang was added to the Central Committee as a member by a decision of the 3rd Plenary Session, held on 18–22 December 1978.)	韩光	Nonmember	Nonmember	1912	1931	2008	Heilongjiang	Han	Male	
Han Xianchu	韩先楚	Member	Member	1913	1930	1986	Hubei	Han	Male	
Han Ying	韩英	Member	Nonmember	1935	1956	Alive	Liaoning	Han	Male	
Hao Jianxiu	郝建秀	Nonmember	Member	1935	1954	Alive	Shandong	Han	Female	
He Cheng	贺诚	Nonmember	Nonmember	1901	1925	1992	Sichuan	Han	Male	
Hong Xuezhi (Note: Hong Xuezhi was added to the Central Committee as a member by a decision of the 4th Plenary Session, held on 25–28 September 1979.)	洪学智	Nonmember	Member	1913	1929	2006	Anhui	Han	Male	
Hu Lijiao	胡立教	Nonmember	Member	1914	1930	2006	Jiangxi	Han	Male	
Hu Qiaomu (Note: Hu Qiaomu was added to the Central Committee as a member by a decision of the 3rd Plenary Session, held on 18–22 December 1978.)	胡乔木	Nonmember	Member	1912	1932	1992	Jiangsu	Han	Male	
Hu Yaobang	胡耀邦	Nonmember	Member	1915	1933	1989	Hunan	Han	Male	
Hua Guofeng	华国锋	Member	Member	1921	1938	2008	Shanxi	Han	Male	
Huang Hua	黄华	Member	Member	1913	1936	2010	Hebei	Han	Male	
Huang Huoqing (Note: Huang Huoqing was added to the Central Committee as a member by a decision of the 3rd Plenary Session, held on 18–22 December 1978.)	黄火青	Nonmember	Nonmember	1901	1926	1999	Hubei	Han	Male	
Huang Kecheng (Note: Huang Kecheng was added to the Central Committee as a member by a decision of the 3rd Plenary Session, held on 18–22 December 1978.)	黄克诚	Nonmember	Nonmember	1902	1925	1986	Hunan	Han	Male	
Huang Oudong	黄欧东	Nonmember	Nonmember	1905	1925	1993	Jiangxi	Han	Male	
Huang Zhen	黄镇	Member	Nonmember	1909	1932	1989	Anhui	Han	Male	
Huang Zhizhen	黄知真	Alternate	Member	1920	1935	1993	Jiangxi	Han	Male	
Huo Shilian	霍士廉	Nonmember	Nonmember	1909	1936	1996	Shanxi	Han	Male	
Ismail Amat	司马义·艾买提	Member	Member	1935	1953	2018	Xinjiang	Uyghur	Male	
Ji Dengkui	纪登奎	Member	Nonmember	1923	1938	1988	Shanxi	Han	Male	
Ji Pengfei	姬鹏飞	Member	Nonmember	1910	1933	2000	Shanxi	Han	Male	
Jiang Hua	江华	Alternate	Nonmember	1907	1925	1999	Hunan	Yao	Male	
Jiang Liyin (Note: Jiang Liyin was removed from the Central Committee at an undisclosed date.)	江礼银	Member	Nonmember	1933	1960	1993	Fujian	Han	Male	
Jiang Nanxiang (Note: Jiang Nanxiang was added to the Central Committee as a member by a decision of the 4th Plenary Session, held on 25–28 September 1979.)	蒋南翔	Nonmember	Member	1913	1933	1988	Jiangsu	Han	Male	
Jiang Weiqing	江渭清	Alternate	Nonmember	1910	1929	2000	Hunan	Han	Male	
Jiang Yonghui	江拥辉	Member	Member	1917	1935	1991	Jiangxi	Han	Male	
Jiao Linyi	焦林义	Member	Member	1920	1937	2005	Hebei	Han	Male	
Kang Keqing	康克清	Nonmember	Member	1911	1931	1992	Jiangxi	Han	Female	
Kang Shi'en	康世恩	Nonmember	Member	1915	1936	1995	Hebei	Han	Male	
Kong Shiquan	孔石泉	Member	Nonmember	1909	1930	2002	Hunan	Han	Male	
Kong Yuan	孔原	Nonmember	Nonmember	1906	1925	1990	Jiangxi	Han	Male	
Kong Zhaonian	孔照年	Member	Nonmember	1925	1942	2019	Shandong	Han	Male	
Li Baohua	李葆华	Member	Nonmember	1909	1931	2005	Hebei	Han	Male	
Li Chang (Note: Li Chang was added to the Central Committee as a member by a decision of the 4th Plenary Session, held on 25–28 September 1979.)	李昌	Nonmember	Nonmember	1914	1936	2010	Hunan	Tujia	Male	
Li Da	李达	Member	Nonmember	1905	1932	1993	Hunan	Han	Male	
Li Desheng	李德生	Member	Member	1916	1932	2011	Henan	Han	Male	
Li Jingquan	李井泉	Member	Nonmember	1909	1930	1989	Jiangxi	Han	Male	
Li Qiang	李强	Member	Nonmember	1905	1925	1996	Jiangsu	Han	Male	
Li Qiming	李启明	Nonmember	Member	1915	1932	2007	Shanxi	Han	Male	
Li Renzhi	李任之	Member	Nonmember	1919	1938	1983	Guangdong	Han	Male	
Li Ruishan	李瑞山	Member	Nonmember	1920	1936	1997	Shaanxi	Han	Male	
Li Shijun	李世俊	Nonmember	Nonmember	1929	1954	Alive	Henan	Han	Male	
Li Shuiqing	李水清	Member	Nonmember	1918	1932	2007	Jiangxi	Han	Male	
Li Xiannian	李先念	Member	Member	1909	1927	1992	Hubei	Han	Male	
Li Zhimin	李志民	Member	Nonmember	1906	1927	1987	Hunan	Han	Male	
Li Ziyuan	李子元	Nonmember	Nonmember	1917	1938	1986	Hebei	Han	Male	
Liang Biye	梁必业	Nonmember	Member	1916	1932	2002	Jiangxi	Han	Male	
Liao Chengzhi	廖承志	Member	Member	1908	1928	1983	Guangdong	Han	Male	
Liao Hansheng	廖汉生	Nonmember	Member	1911	1933	2006	Hunan	Tujia	Male	
Liao Zhigao	廖志高	Alternate	Nonmember	1913	1934	2000	Sichuan	Han	Male	
Lin Hujia	林乎加	Nonmember	Member	1916	1938	2018	Shandong	Han	Male	
Lin Liming (Note: Lin Liming died of natural causes in 1977.)	林李明	Alternate	Nonmember	1910	1933	1977	Guangdong	Han	Male	
Lin Liyun	林丽韫	Member	Member	1933	1963	Alive	Taiwan	Han	Female	
Liu Bocheng	刘伯承	Member	Nonmember	1892	1926	1986	Sichuan	Han	Male	
Liu Chunqiao	刘春樵	Alternate	Nonmember	1923	1950	2006	Hunan	Han	Male	
Liu Guangtao	刘光涛	Alternate	Nonmember	1920	1938	2011	Shaanxi	Han	Male	
Liu Jianxun	刘建勋	Member	Nonmember	1913	1931	1983	Hebei	Han	Male	
Liu Lanbo (Note: Liu Lanbo was added to the Central Committee as a member by a decision of the 4th Plenary Session, held on 25–28 September 1979.)	刘澜波	Nonmember	Nonmember	1904	1928	1982	Liaoning	Han	Male	
Liu Lantao (Note: Liu Lantao was added to the Central Committee as a member by a decision of the 4th Plenary Session, held on 25–28 September 1979.)	刘澜涛	Nonmember	Nonmember	1910	1928	1997	Liaoning	Han	Male	
Liu Wei	刘伟	Member	Nonmember	1916	1934	1998	Jiangxi	Han	Male	
Liu Xichang (Note: Liu Xichang was removed from the Central Committee at an undisclosed date.)	刘锡昌	Member	Nonmember	1934	1958	Alive	Jiangsu	Han	Male	
Liu Xingyuan	刘兴元	Member	Nonmember	1908	1931	1990	Shandong	Han	Male	
Liu Zhen	刘震	Nonmember	Member	1915	1932	1992	Hubei	Han	Male	
Liu Zihou	刘子厚	Member	Nonmember	1911	1929	2001	Hebei	Han	Male	
Lu Dadong	鲁大东	Alternate	Member	1915	1938	1998	Hebei	Han	Male	
Lu Dingyi (Note: Lu Dingyi was added to the Central Committee as a member by a decision of the 4th Plenary Session, held on 25–28 September 1979.)	陆定一	Nonmember	Nonmember	1906	1925	1996	Jiangsu	Han	Male	
Lu Tianji (Note: Lu Tianji was removed from the Central Committee at an undisclosed date.)	鹿田计	Member	Nonmember	1929	1955	Alive	Jiangsu	Han	Male	
Luo Qingchang	罗青长	Member	Member	1918	1936	2014	Sichuan	Han	Male	
Luo Ruiqing (Note: Luo Ruiqing died of natural causes on 3 August 1978.)	罗瑞卿	Nonmember	Nonmember	1906	1926	1978	Sichuan	Han	Male	
Lü Yulan	吕玉兰	Member	Nonmember	1941	1958	1993	Hebei	Han	Female	
Lü Zhengcao	吕正操	Nonmember	Nonmember	1904	1937	2009	Liaoning	Han	Male	
Ma Hui	马辉	Nonmember	Nonmember	1915	1930	1998	Jiangxi	Han	Male	
Ma Li (Note: Ma Li died of natural causes on 25 September 1979.)	马力	Nonmember	Nonmember	1916	1938	1979	Tianjin	Han	Male	
Ma Wenrui	马文瑞	Nonmember	Member	1912	1926	2004	Shaanxi	Han	Male	
Ma Xingyuan	马兴元	Nonmember	Member	1917	1939	2005	Shaanxi	Han	Male	
Mao Zhiyong	毛致用	Nonmember	Member	1929	1952	2019	Hunan	Han	Male	
Ni Zhifu	倪志福	Member	Member	1933	1958	2013	Shanghai	Han	Male	
Nie Fengzhi	聂凤智	Nonmember	Nonmember	1914	1928	1992	Hubei	Han	Male	
Nie Rongzhen	聂荣臻	Member	Member	1899	1923	1992	Sichuan	Han	Male	
Peng Chong	彭冲	Alternate	Member	1915	1934	2010	Fujian	Han	Male	
Peng Shaohui (Note: Peng Shaohui died of natural causes on 25 April 1978.)	彭绍辉	Member	Nonmember	1906	1928	1978	Hunan	Han	Male	
Peng Zhen (Note: Peng Zhen was added to the Central Committee as a member by a decision of the 4th Plenary Session, held on 25–28 September 1979.)	彭真	Nonmember	Member	1902	1923	1997	Shanxi	Han	Male	
Qian Zhengying	钱正英	Member	Member	1900	1927	1994	Zhejiang	Han	Female	
Qian Zhiguang	钱之光	Member	Nonmember	1900	1927	1994	Zhejiang	Han	Male	
Qiao Xiaoguang	乔晓光	Nonmember	Member	1918	1934	2003	Hebei	Han	Male	
Qin Jiwei	秦基伟	Member	Member	1914	1930	1997	Hubei	Han	Male	
Qin Yingji	覃应机	Nonmember	Member	1915	1931	1992	Guangxi	Zhuang	Male	
Rao Xingli	饶兴礼	Member	Member	1925	1951	2000	Hubei	Han	Male	
Ren Rong	任荣	Alternate	Nonmember	1917	1934	2017	Sichuan	Han	Male	
Ren Sizhong	任思忠	Member	Nonmember	1918	1936	2004	Sichuan	Han	Male	
Ren Zhongyi	任仲夷	Nonmember	Member	1914	1936	2005	Hebei	Han	Male	
Ruan Bosheng	阮泊生	Alternate	Nonmember	1916	1933	2017	Hebei	Han	Male	
Seypidin	赛福鼎	Member	Member	1915	1949	2003	Xinjiang	Uyghur	Male	
Song Ping	宋平	Nonmember	Member	1917	1937	2026	Shandong	Han	Male	
Song Renqiong (Note: Song Renqiong was added to the Central Committee as a member by a decision of the 3rd Plenary Session, held on 18–22 December 1978.)	宋任穷	Nonmember	Member	1909	1926	2005	Hunan	Han	Male	
Song Shilun	宋时轮	Alternate	Nonmember	1907	1926	1991	Hunan	Han	Male	
Su Jing	苏静	Member	Nonmember	1910	1936	1997	Fujian	Han	Male	
Su Yiran	苏毅然	Nonmember	Member	1918	1936	2021	Sichuan	Han	Male	
Su Yu	粟裕	Member	Nonmember	1907	1927	1984	Hunan	Dong	Male	
Su Zhenhua (Note: Su Zhenhua died of natural causes on 7 February 1979.)	苏振华	Member	Nonmember	1912	1930	1979	Hunan	Han	Male	
Tan Qilong	谭启龙	Member	Member	1913	1933	2003	Jiangxi	She	Male	
Tan Zhenlin	谭震林	Member	Nonmember	1902	1926	1983	Hunan	Han	Male	
Tang Ke	唐克	Nonmember	Member	1918	1938	2013	Jiangsu	Han	Male	
Tian Bao	天宝	Member	Nonmember	1917	1935	2008	Sichuan	Tibetan	Male	
Tie Ying	铁瑛	Alternate	Member	1916	1937	2009	Henan	Han	Male	
Ulanhu	乌兰夫	Member	Member	1906	1925	1988	Suiyuan	Tümed	Male	
Wan Da	万达	Nonmember	Member	1918	1937	2002	Henan	Han	Male	
Wan Li	万里	Nonmember	Member	1916	1936	2015	Shandong	Han	Male	
Wang Bicheng	王必成	Member	Nonmember	1912	1930	1989	Hubei	Han	Male	
Wang Chaozhu	王超柱	Member	Nonmember	1917	1959	1993	Shandong	Han	Male	
Wang Dongxing	汪东兴	Member	Nonmember	1916	1932	2015	Jiangxi	Han	Male	
Wang Enmao	王恩茂	Nonmember	Member	1913	1930	2001	Jiangxi	Han	Male	
Wang Feng	汪锋	Nonmember	Nonmember	1910	1927	1998	Shaanxi	Han	Male	
Wang Guangyu	王光宇	Nonmember	Member	1919	1938	2017	Anhui	Han	Male	
Wang Guofan	王国藩	Member	Nonmember	1919	1958	2005	Hebei	Han	Male	
Wang Heshou (Note: Wang Heshou was added to the Central Committee as a member by a decision of the 4th Plenary Session, held on 25–28 September 1979.)	王鹤寿	Nonmember	Member	1909	1925	1999	Hebei	Han	Male	
Wang Linhe	王林鹤	Nonmember	Nonmember	1931	1959	1995	Zhejiang	Han	Male	
Wang Maoquan	王茂全	Nonmember	Nonmember	1933	1955	2009	Chongqing	Han	Male	
Wang Meng	王猛	Nonmember	Member	1920	1938	2007	Hebei	Han	Male	
Wang Mingzhang	汪明章	Nonmember	Nonmember	1939	1966	2025	Zhejiang	Han	Male	
Wang Ping	王平	Nonmember	Nonmember	1907	1930	1998	Hubei	Han	Male	
Wang Qian	王谦	Alternate	Nonmember	1917	1936	2007	Shanxi	Han	Male	
Wang Renzhong (Note: Wang Renzhong was added to the Central Committee as a member by a decision of the 3rd Plenary Session, held on 18–22 December 1978.)	王任重	Nonmember	Member	1917	1933	1992	Hebei	Han	Male	
Wang Shitai	王世泰	Nonmember	Nonmember	1910	1929	2008	Shaanxi	Han	Male	
Wang Shoudao	王首道	Member	Nonmember	1906	1926	1996	Hunan	Han	Male	
Wang Xiuxiu	王秀秀	Nonmember	Nonmember	1932	1953	Alive	Zhejiang	Han	Female	
Wang Yiping	王一平	Nonmember	Nonmember	1914	1932	2007	Shandong	Han	Male	
Wang Zhen (Note: Wang Zhen died of natural causes on 13 August 1978.)	王震	Member	Member	1908	1927	1993	Hunan	Han	Male	
Wang Zheng	王诤	Member	Nonmember	1909	1934	1978	Jiangsu	Han	Male	
Wei Guoqing	韦国清	Member	Member	1913	1931	1989	Guangxi	Zhuang	Male	
Wu De	吴德	Member	Nonmember	1913	1933	1995	Hebei	Han	Male	
Wu Guixian	吴桂贤	Member	Nonmember	1938	1958	2025	Henan	Han	Female	
Wu Quanqing	吴全清	Nonmember	Member	1938	1966	Alive	Shandong	Han	Male	
Wu Xiuquan	伍修权	Nonmember	Nonmember	1908	1931	1997	Hubei	Han	Male	
Xi Houba	希候巴	Nonmember	Nonmember	1934	1954	1984	Qinghai	Tibetan	Male	
Xi Zhongxun (Note: Xi Zhongxun was added to the Central Committee as a member by a decision of the 3rd Plenary Session, held on 18–22 December 1978.)	习仲勋	Nonmember	Member	1913	1928	2002	Shaanxi	Han	Male	
Xiao Hua	肖华	Nonmember	Member	1916	1928	1985	Jiangxi	Han	Male	
Xiao Jinguang	肖劲光	Member	Nonmember	1903	1922	1989	Hunan	Han	Male	
Xiao Ke	肖克	Alternate	Nonmember	1907	1927	2008	Hunan	Han	Male	
Xie Xuegong (Note: Xie Xuegong was removed from the Central Committee at an undisclosed date.)	解学恭	Member	Nonmember	1916	1936	1993	Shanxi	Han	Male	
Xing Yanzi	邢燕子	Member	Member	1940	1960	2022	Tianjin	Han	Female	
Xu Jiatun	许家屯	Nonmember	Member	1916	1938	2016	Jiangsu	Han	Male	
Xu Shiyou	许世友	Member	Nonmember	1905	1927	1985	Henan	Han	Male	
Xu Xiangqian	徐向前	Member	Member	1901	1927	1990	Shanxi	Han	Male	
Xue Jinda	薛金达	Nonmember	Nonmember	1929	1956	Alive	Jiangsu	Han	Male	
Yang Chengwu	杨成武	Nonmember	Member	1914	1930	2004	Fujian	Han	Male	
Yang Dezhi	杨得志	Member	Member	1911	1928	1994	Hunan	Han	Male	
Yang Jingren	楊靜仁	Nonmember	Member	1918	1937	2001	Gansu	Hui	Male	
Yang Shangkun (Note: Yang Shangkun was added to the Central Committee as a member by a decision of the 4th Plenary Session, held on 25–28 September 1979.)	杨尚昆	Nonmember	Member	1907	1926	1998	Chongqing	Han	Male	
Yang Yichen	杨易辰	Nonmember	Member	1914	1936	1997	Liaoning	Han	Male	
Yang Yong	杨勇	Member	Member	1913	1930	1983	Hunan	Han	Male	
Yao Yilin	姚依林	Alternate	Member	1917	1935	1994	Anhui	Han	Male	
Ye Fei	叶飞	Alternate	Member	1914	1932	1999	Philippines	Han	Male	
Ye Jianying	叶剑英	Member	Member	1897	1927	1986	Guangdong	Han	Male	
Yu Hongliang	于洪亮	Member	Nonmember	1935	1959	1990	Shandong	Han	Male	
Yu Mingtao	于明涛	Nonmember	Member	1917	1936	2017	Hebei	Han	Male	
Yu Qiuli	余秋里	Member	Member	1914	1931	1999	Jiangxi	Han	Male	
Yu Sang	于桑	Member	Nonmember	1917	1936	2008	Sichuan	Han	Male	
You Taizhong	尤太忠	Member	Member	1918	1934	1998	Henan	Han	Male	
Zeng Shaoshan	曾绍山	Member	Nonmember	1914	1933	1995	Anhui	Han	Male	
Zeng Siyu	曾思玉	Member	Nonmember	1911	1932	2012	Jiangxi	Han	Male	
Zhang Aiping	张爱萍	Nonmember	Member	1910	1928	2003	Sichuan	Han	Male	
Zhang Caiqian	张才千	Member	Nonmember	1911	1931	1994	Hubei	Han	Male	
Zhang Dingcheng (Note: Zhang Dingcheng died of natural causes on 16 December 1981.)	张鼎丞	Member	Nonmember	1898	1927	1981	Fujian	Han	Male	
Zhang Fugui	张富贵	Member	Nonmember	1913	1944	1994	Shandong	Han	Male	
Zhang Fuheng	张福恒	Member	Nonmember	1931	1960	Alive	Hebei	Han	Male	
Zhang Jingfu	张劲夫	Nonmember	Member	1914	1935	2015	Anhui	Han	Male	
Zhang Lixian	张立宪	Nonmember	Nonmember	1918	1937	1986	Shaanxi	Han	Male	
Zhang Pinghua	张平化	Member	Nonmember	1908	1927	2001	Hunan	Han	Male	
Zhang Tingfa	张廷发	Nonmember	Member	1918	1933	2010	Fujian	Han	Male	
Zhang Yuhua	张玉华	Nonmember	Nonmember	1916	1935	2017	Shandong	Han	Male	
Zhang Zhixiu	张铚秀	Nonmember	Member	1915	1930	2009	Jiangxi	Han	Male	
Zhao Cangbi	赵苍璧	Nonmember	Member	1916	1935	1993	Shaanxi	Han	Male	
Zhao Xinchu	赵辛初	Alternate	Nonmember	1915	1938	1991	Hubei	Han	Male	
Zhao Zhijian	赵志坚	Nonmember	Member	1936	1953	Alive	Jiangxi	Han	Male	
Zhao Ziyang	赵紫阳	Member	Member	1919	1938	2005	Henan	Han	Male	
Zhou Chunlin	周纯麟	Member	Nonmember	1912	1932	1986	Hubei	Han	Male	
Zhou Hui (Note: Zhou Hui was added to the Central Committee as a member by a decision of the 3rd Plenary Session, held on 18–22 December 1978.)	周惠	Nonmember	Member	1919	1938	2004	Jiangsu	Han	Male	
Zhou Jianren	周建人	Member	Nonmember	1888	1948	1984	Zhejiang	Han	Male	
Zhou Yang (Note: Zhou Yang was added to the Central Committee as a member by a decision of the 4th Plenary Session, held on 25–28 September 1979.)	周扬	Nonmember	Nonmember	1908	1927	1989	Hunan	Han	Male	
Zhu Guangya	朱光亚	Alternate	Member	1924	1956	2011	Hubei	Han	Male	
Zhu Muzhi	朱穆之	Member	Member	1916	1938	2015	Jiangsu	Han	Male	
Zong Xiyun	宗希云	Member	Nonmember	1928	1953	Alive	Shandong	Han	Male	
