= Heilongjiang Provincial People's Government =

Heilongjiang Provincial People's Government 黑龙江省人民政府
- Established: April 1949; 77 years ago

Leadership
- Governor: Liang Huiling; 9 December 2022
- Parent body: Central People's Government; Heilongjiang Provincial People's Congress
- Elected by: Heilongjiang Provincial People's Congress

Website
- www.hlj.gov.cn

The Heilongjiang Provincial People's Government is the local administrative agency of Heilongjiang. It is officially elected by the Heilongjiang Provincial People's Congress and is formally responsible to the Heilongjiang Provincial People's Congress and its Standing Committee. Under the country's one-party system, the governor is subordinate to the secretary of the Heilongjiang Provincial Committee of the Chinese Communist Party. The Provincial government is headed by a governor, currently Liang Huiling.

== History ==
In 1949, the Heilongjiang Provincial People's Government was formally established. In April 1949, Nenjiang Province was incorporated. In June 1954, Songjiang Province was incorporated. In November 1955, the Heilongjiang Provincial People's Government was reorganized into the Heilongjiang Provincial People's Committee. In March 1967, the Heilongjiang Provincial Revolutionary Committee was established. In December 1979, the Heilongjiang Provincial Revolutionary Committee was abolished and the Heilongjiang Provincial People's Government was re-established.

== Organization ==
The organization of the Heilongjiang Provincial People's Government includes:

- General Office of the Heilongjiang Provincial People's Government

=== Component Departments ===
- Heilongjiang Provincial Development and Reform Commission
- Heilongjiang Provincial Department of Education
- Heilongjiang Provincial Department of Science and Technology
- Heilongjiang Provincial Department of Industry and Information Technology
- Heilongjiang Provincial Ethnic and Religious Affairs Committee
- Heilongjiang Provincial Public Security Department
- Heilongjiang Provincial Department of Civil Affairs
- Heilongjiang Provincial Department of Justice
- Heilongjiang Provincial Department of Finance
- Heilongjiang Provincial Department of Human Resources and Social Security
- Heilongjiang Provincial Department of Natural Resources
- Heilongjiang Provincial Department of Ecology and Environment
- Heilongjiang Provincial Department of Housing and Urban-Rural Development
- Heilongjiang Provincial Department of Transportation
- Heilongjiang Provincial Water Resources Department
- Heilongjiang Provincial Department of Agriculture and Rural Affairs
- Heilongjiang Provincial Department of Commerce
- Heilongjiang Provincial Department of Culture and Tourism
- Heilongjiang Provincial Health Commission
- Heilongjiang Provincial Department of Veterans Affairs
- Heilongjiang Provincial Emergency Management Department
- Heilongjiang Provincial Audit Office
- Foreign Affairs Office of Heilongjiang Provincial People's Government

=== Directly affiliated special institution ===
- State-owned Assets Supervision and Administration Commission of Heilongjiang Provincial People's Government

=== Organizations under the government ===
- Heilongjiang Provincial Market Supervision Administration
- Heilongjiang Provincial Radio and Television Bureau
- Heilongjiang Provincial Sports Bureau
- Heilongjiang Provincial Bureau of Statistics
- Heilongjiang Provincial Medical Insurance Bureau
- Heilongjiang Provincial Business Environment Construction Supervision Bureau
- Heilongjiang Provincial Forestry and Grassland Bureau
- Heilongjiang Provincial Government Affairs Bureau
- Research Office of Heilongjiang Provincial People's Government
- Heilongjiang Provincial Rural Revitalization Bureau
- Heilongjiang Provincial National Defense Mobilization Office

=== Departmental management organization ===
- The Heilongjiang Provincial Bureau of Grain and Material Reserves is managed by the Provincial Development and Reform Commission.
- The Heilongjiang Provincial Prison Administration Bureau is managed by the Provincial Department of Justice.
- The Heilongjiang Provincial Administration of Traditional Chinese Medicine is managed by the Provincial Health Commission.
- The Heilongjiang Provincial Coal Production Safety Administration is managed by the Provincial Emergency Management Department.
- The Heilongjiang Provincial Drug Administration is managed by the Provincial Market Supervision Bureau.
- The Heilongjiang Provincial Intellectual Property Office is managed by the Provincial Market Supervision Bureau.

=== Directly affiliated institutions ===
- Heilongjiang Academy of Sciences
- Heilongjiang Academy of Agricultural Sciences
- Heilongjiang Academy of Forestry Sciences
- Heilongjiang Public Resources Trading Center
- Heilongjiang Provincial Supply and Marketing Cooperatives Federation
- Heilongjiang Coalfield Geological Survey Institute
- Heilongjiang Coalfield Geology Bureau
- Heilongjiang Provincial Bureau of Geology and Mineral Resources
- Heilongjiang Nonferrous Metals Geological Exploration Bureau
- Heilongjiang Provincial Reception Office (Deputy Department Level)

=== Dispatched institution ===
- Heilongjiang Province Daxinganling District Administrative Office

=== Dispatched agencies ===
- Harbin New Area Administration Committee
- Heilongjiang Jiansanjiang Economic Development Zone Management Committee
- Heilongjiang Zhalong National Nature Reserve Administration
- Heilongjiang Provincial People's Government Heixiazi Island Construction and Management Committee (Deputy Department Level)

=== Enterprises that directly perform the duties of investors ===
- China Longjiang Forest Industry Group Co., Ltd.
- Heilongjiang Yichun Forest Industry Group Co., Ltd. (managed by the Yichun Municipal People's Government)

== See also ==
- Politics of Heilongjiang
  - Heilongjiang Provincial People's Congress
  - Heilongjiang Provincial People's Government
    - Governor of Heilongjiang
  - Heilongjiang Provincial Committee of the Chinese Communist Party
    - Party Secretary of Heilongjiang
  - Heilongjiang Provincial Committee of the Chinese People's Political Consultative Conference
