= Party Secretary of Heilongjiang =

Provincial government position in China

Secretary of the Heilongjiang Provincial Committee of the Chinese Communist Party
- 中国共产党黑龙江省委员会书记
- Emblem of the Chinese Communist Party

- Flag of the Chinese Communist Party

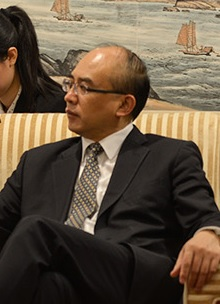
- Incumbent; Xu Qin since 18 October 2021
- Heilongjiang Provincial Committee of the Chinese Communist Party
- Type: Party Committee Secretary
- Status: Provincial and ministerial-level official
- Member of: Heilongjiang Provincial Standing Committee
- Nominator: Central Committee
- Appointer: Heilongjiang Provincial Committee; Central Committee
- Inaugural holder: Zhang Qilong
- Formation: May 1949
- Deputy: Deputy Secretary; Secretary-General

The secretary of the Heilongjiang Provincial Committee of the Chinese Communist Party is the leader of the Heilongjiang Provincial Committee of the Chinese Communist Party (CCP). As the CCP is the sole ruling party of the People's Republic of China (PRC), the secretary is the highest ranking post in Heilongjiang.

The secretary is officially appointed by the CCP Central Committee based on the recommendation of the CCP Organization Department, which is then approved by the Politburo and its Standing Committee. The secretary can be also appointed by a plenary meeting of the Heilongjiang Provincial Committee, but the candidate must be the same as the one approved by the central government. The secretary leads the Standing Committee of the Heilongjiang Provincial Committee, and is usually a member of the CCP Central Committee. The secretary leads the work of the Provincial Committee and its Standing Committee. The secretary is outranks the governor, who is generally the deputy secretary of the committee.

The current secretary is Xu Qin, who took office on 18 October 2021.

== List of party secretaries ==
Image	Name	Term start	Term end	Ref.
	Zhang Qilong (张启龙)	May 1949	March 1950	
	Zhao Dezun (赵德尊)	March 1950	April 1953	
	Feng Jixin (冯纪新)	April 1953	July 1954	
	Ouyang Qin (欧阳钦)	July 1954	October 1965	
	Pan Fusheng (潘复生)	October 1965	June 1971	
	Wang Jiadao (汪家道)	August 1971	December 1974	
	Liu Guangtao (刘光涛)	February 1977	December 1977	
	Yang Yichen (杨易辰)	December 1977	March 1983	
	Li Li'an (李力安)	March 1983	October 1985	
	Sun Weiben (孙维本)	October 1985	April 1994	
	Yue Qifeng (岳歧峰)	April 1994	July 1997	
	Xu Youfang (徐有芳)	July 1997	March 2003	
	Song Fatang (宋法棠)	March 2003	December 2005	
	Qian Yunlu (钱运录)	December 2005	April 2008	
	Ji Bingxuan (吉炳轩)	April 2008	March 2013	
	Wang Xiankui (王宪魁)	March 2013	April 2017	
	Zhang Qingwei (张庆伟)	April 2017	October 2021	
	Xu Qin (许勤)	October 2021	Incumbent	
