= Heilongjiang Provincial Committee of the Chinese People's Political Consultative Conference =

Heilongjiang Provincial Committee of the Chinese People's Political Consultative Conference 中国人民政治协商会议黑龙江省委员会
- 13th
- Emblem of the Chinese People's Political Consultative Conference

Type
- Type: United front organ Constitutional convention (Historical); Legislature (Historical) of Chinese People's Political Consultative Conference

History
- Founded: February 21, 1955; 71 years ago
- Preceded by: Heilongjiang Provincial People's Congress Consultative Committee

Leadership
- Chairperson: Lan Shaomin

Website
- www.hljzx.gov.cn

Chinese name
- Simplified Chinese: 中国人民政治协商会议黑龙江省委员会
- Traditional Chinese: 中國人民政治協商會議黑龍江省委員會
Transcriptions
Standard Mandarin
- Hanyu Pinyin: Zhōngguó Rénmín Zhèngzhì Xiéshāng Huìyì Hēilóngjiāngshěng Wěiyuánhuì

Abbreviation
- Simplified Chinese: 黑龙江省政协
- Traditional Chinese: 黑龍江省政協
- Literal meaning: CPPCC Heilongjiang Provincial Committee
Transcriptions
Standard Mandarin
- Hanyu Pinyin: Hēilóngjiāngshěng Zhèngxié

The Heilongjiang Provincial Committee of the Chinese People's Political Consultative Conference (Chinese: 中国人民政治协商会议黑龙江省委员会; abbreviation CPPCC Heilongjiang Provincial Committee) is the provincial advisory body and a local organization of the Chinese People's Political Consultative Conference in Heilongjiang, China. It is supervised and directed by the Heilongjiang Provincial Committee of the Chinese Communist Party.

== History ==
The Heilongjiang Provincial Committee of the Chinese People's Political Consultative Conference traces its origins to the Heilongjiang Provincial People's Congress Consultative Committee (黑龙江省各界人民代表会议协商委员会), founded in 1950.

=== Anti-corruption campaign ===
In February 2005, Han Guizhi was put under investigation for alleged "serious violations of discipline and laws" by the Central Commission for Discipline Inspection (CCDI), the party's internal disciplinary body. In December 2005, she was sentenced to death with a two-year reprieve for bribery by Beijing Intermediate People's Court.

== Term ==
=== 1st ===
- Term: February 1955–August 1959
- Chairperson: Ouyang Qin
- Vice Chairpersons: Zhang Ruilin, Du Guangyu, Wang Qingzheng, Liu Peizhi

=== 2nd ===
- Term: August 1959–September 1964
- Chairperson: Ouyang Qin
- Vice Chairpersons: Yang Yichen, Li Yanlu, Yu Lin, Zhang Ruilin, Du Guangyu, Wang Qingzheng, Du Guoping, Liu Peizhi, Huang Fanggang

=== 3rd ===
- Term: September 1964–December 1977
- Chairperson: Ouyang Qin
- Vice Chairpersons: Yang Yichen, Zhang Ruilin, Yu Tianfang, Wang Qingzheng, Du Guoping, Liu Peizhi, Huang Fanggang, Xue Shouchen, Shao Jun

=== 4th ===
- Term: December 1977–April 1983
- Chairperson: Yang Yichen → Wang Yilun (December 1979–)
- Vice Chairpersons: Wang Yilun (– December 1979), Li Yanlu, Yang Heting, Zhang Ruilin, Wang Minggui, Wu Cheng, Wang Jinling, Liu Huixian, Tang Liandi, Wang Zhaozhi, Guo Shouchang, Xiao Yizhou (December 1979–), Wang Weizhi (December 1979–), Sun Xiqi (December 1979–), Xue Lanbin (December 1979–), Jin Langbai (December 1979–), Gao Heng (March 1982–)

=== 5th ===
- Term: April 1983–April 1988
- Chairperson: Li Jianbai → Wang Zhao (May 1985–)
- Vice Chairpersons: Bao Cong, Wang Minggui, Yang Zirong, Tang Liandi, Wang Weizhi, Guo Shouchang, Li Min, Huang Dexin, Fu Shiying, Hu Yuxian, Hong Jing, Ma Xinquan, Li He (May 1986–), Zong Kewen (March 1987–)

=== 6th ===
- Term: April 1988–January 1993
- Chairperson: Wang Zhao
- Vice Chairpersons: Zhang Li, Wang Fei, Liu Huixian, Tang Liandi, Guo Shouchang, Li Min, Huang Dexin, Fu Shiying, Ma Xinquan, Zong Kewen, Huang Feng (May 1990–), Quan Yuxiang (March 1991–), Meng Chuansheng (March 1991–), Chen Wenzhi (March 1991–)

=== 7th ===
- Term: January 1993–January 1998
- Chairperson: Zhou Wenhua
- Vice Chairpersons: Huang Feng, Dai Moan, Fu Shiying, Guo Shouchang, Chen Wenzhi, Tan Fangzhi, Zhao Shijie, Chen Zhanyuan, Wang Zhitian, Wu Dinghe

=== 8th ===
- Term: January 1998–January 2003
- Chairperson: Zhou Wenhua
- Vice Chairpersons: Ma Guoliang, Tan Fangzhi, Cao Yafan, Shen Genrong, Wang Yuzhu, Wang Naiqian, Ouyang Yin, Liu Wenpan

=== 9th ===
- Term: January 2003–January 2008
- Chairperson: Han Guizhi
- Vice Chairpersons: Cao Guangliang, Cao Yafan, Ouyang Yin, Liu Wenpan, Chi Jianfu, Zhang Shuping, Wang Taozhi, Chen Shutao, Liang Rongxin, He Xiaoping

=== 10th ===
- Term: January 2008–January 2013
- Chairperson: Wang Julu (–January 2011) → Du Yuxin (January 2011–)
- Vice Chairpersons: Liu Haisheng, Wang Limin, Wang Taozhi, He Xiaoping, Zeng Yukang, Hong Yuanshu, Zhao Yusen, Tao Xiaxin, Sun Dongsheng, Li Jichun (January 2010–), Guo Xiaohua (January 2011–), Li Yanzhi (January 2012–)

=== 11th ===
- Term: January 2013–January 2018
- Chairperson: Du Yuxin
- Vice Chairpersons: Zhao Kefei, Cheng Youdong, He Xiaoping (– January 2016), Hong Yuanshu, Zhao Yusen, Tao Xiaxin (– January 2016), Li Jichun (– January 2016), Guo Xiaohua (– January 2016), Du Jiming, Gong Jinkun (January 2015–), Yu Shayan (January 2016–), Zhang Xianjun (January 2016–), Huang Jiansheng (January 2017–)
- Secretary-General: Zhao Kefei (concurrently)

=== 12th ===
- Term: January 2018–January 2023
- Chairperson: Huang Jiansheng
- Vice Chairpersons: Lü Weifeng (– February 2021), Hao Huilong, Zhao Yusen, Gong Jinkun, Zhang Xianyou, Ma Liqun, Liu Muzhong, Pang Da, Chi Zijian (January 2020–), Han Lihua (February 2021–), Qu Min (February 2021–), Chen Haibo (January 2022–), Li Haitao (January 2022–), Nie Yunling (January 2022–)
- Secretary-General: Xia Lihua

=== 13th ===
- Term: January 2023–2028
- Chairperson: Lan Shaomin
- Vice Chairpersons: Chen Haibo, Li Haitao (– September 2023), Zhang Xianyou, Ma Liqun, Pang Da, Chi Zijian, Han Lihua, Qu Min (– June 2023), Qian Fuyong, Zhang Yazhong, Shao Guoqiang (January 2024–)
- Secretary-General: Zhang Yazhong (concurrently) (– January 2025) → Xu Liren (January 2025–)
