= Shao Qihui =

Chinese engineer and politician (1934–2026)

- 邵奇惠

Governor of Heilongjiang
- In office March 1989 – May 1994
- Preceded by: Hou Jie
- Succeeded by: Tian Fengshan

Personal details
- Born: 16 June 1934 Yixing, Jiangsu, China
- Died: 17 September 2026 (aged 92)
- Party: Chinese Communist Party
- Education: Harbin Institute of Technology

Shao Qihui (Chinese: 邵奇惠; pinyin: Shào Qíhuì; 16 June 1934 – 17 September 2026) was a Chinese engineer and politician who served as governor of Heilongjiang from 1989 to 1994.

Shao was a representative of the 13th and 14th National Congress of the Chinese Communist Party. He was a member of the 14th Central Committee of the Chinese Communist Party. He was a delegate to the 7th and 8th National People's Congress. He was a member of the 9th National Committee of the Chinese People's Political Consultative Conference and a member of the Standing Committee of the 10th Chinese People's Political Consultative Conference.

== Early life and education ==
Shao was born in the town of Gaocheng, Yixing, Jiangsu, in 16 June 1934. His father, Shao Jun(邵均), was a forester and politician who served as a professor at Zhejiang University and as Vice Chairman of the CPPCC Heilongjiang Provincial Committee. He attended Hangzhou No. 2 High School and worked as secretary of the Youth League Committee at the school after graduation in September 1952. He joined the Chinese Communist Party (CCP) in October 1953.

== Career in Zhejiang ==
In February 1955, he was appointed deputy director of the Office of Hangzhou Municipal Committee of the Communist Youth League, and held that office until March 1958, when he was downgraded to worker at Wulin Machinery Factory due to "making ake mistakes".

== Career in Heilongjiang ==
In February 1962, he was transferred to Harbin Forestry Machinery Factory, where he successively served as worker, technician, deputy factory director and chief engineer, and factory director. During that period, he studied at Harbin Institute of Technology by taking classes at night, majoring in machine manufacturing. After working in the factory for more than 23 years, he became deputy party secretary of the Harbin in May 1985, a position he held until April 1987, when he was made party secretary of Qiqihar. After a short term as vice-governor of Heilongjiang between January 1988 and January 1989, he became acting governor in December 1988 and in January 1989 succeeded Hou Jie as governor.

== Career in central government ==
After his replacement as governor, Shao served as executive vice-minister of the Ministry of Machinery Industry from May 1994 to March 1998. In March 1998, he became director of the State Bureau of Machine Building Industry, a post he kept until September 1999.

== Death ==
Shao died on 17 September 2026, at the age of 92.

Government offices
Preceded by Hou Jie	Governor of Heilongjiang; 1989–1994	Succeeded by Tian Fengshan
