= Ji Bingxuan =

Chinese politician (born 1951)

- 吉炳轩
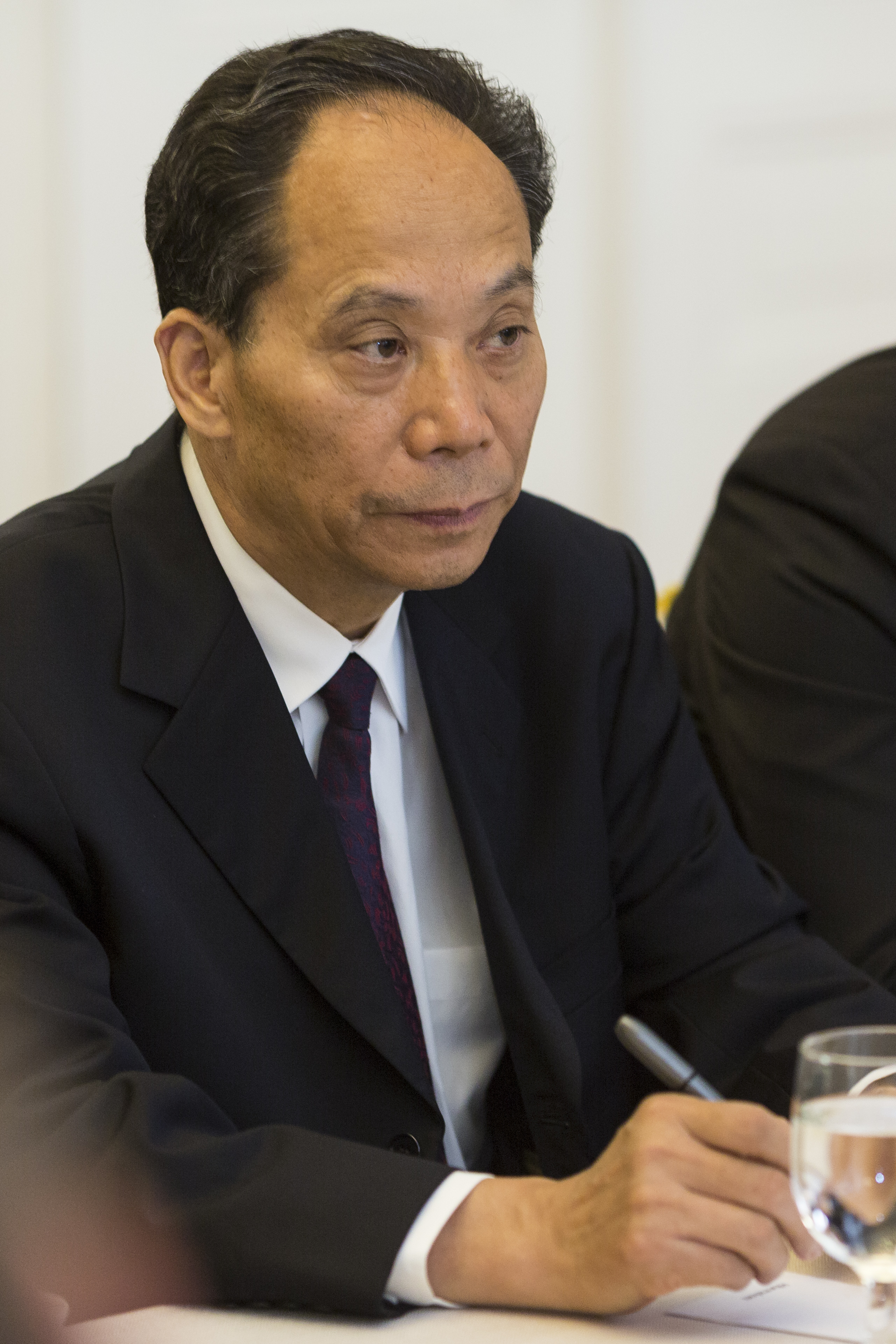

Vice Chairman of the Standing Committee National People's Congress
- In office 14 March 2013 – 10 March 2023
- Chairman: Zhang Dejiang; Li Zhanshu

Party Secretary of Heilongjiang
- In office April 2008 – March 2013
- Deputy: Li Zhanshu (Governor); Wang Xiankui
- Preceded by: Qian Yunlu
- Succeeded by: Wang Xiankui

Personal details
- Born: November 17, 1951 (age 74) Mengjin County, Luoyang, Henan
- Party: Chinese Communist Party
- Education: Zhengzhou University

Ji Bingxuan (Chinese: 吉炳轩; pinyin: Jí Bǐngxuān; born November 1951) is a Chinese politician who served as a vice chairman of the Standing Committee of the National People's Congress from 2013 to 2023. From 2008 to 2013, he held the highest post in Heilongjiang province, serving as its Party Secretary.

== Biography ==
He was born in Mengjin County, Henan Province, and joined the Chinese Communist Party (CCP) in 1980. His former posts include the Secretary of the Communist Youth League of China Henan committee, secretary of the central secretariat of the Communist Youth League, a standing committee member of the CPC Jilin committee, the director of the Publicity Department of Jilin, vice director of the CCP central Publicity Department, and the vice director of the State Administration of Radio, Film, and Television. In November 2002, he became the spokesman for the 16th National Congress of the Chinese Communist Party. In 2003, he was appointed to the position of executive vice director of the CCP Central Publicity Department. In April 2008, he became a standing committee member and the secretary of the CCP Heilongjiang committee.

He has been an alternate of the 16th Central Committee of the Chinese Communist Party, and a full member of the 17th, 18th, and 19th Central Committees.

On 7 December 2020, pursuant to Executive Order 13936, the US Department of the Treasury imposed sanctions on all 14 Vice Chairperson of the National People's Congress, including Ji, for "undermining Hong Kong's autonomy and restricting the freedom of expression or assembly."
