= Xu Youfang =

Chinese politician

- 徐有芳

Party Secretary of Heilongjiang
- In office July 1997 – April 2003
- Preceded by: Yue Qifeng
- Succeeded by: Song Fatang

Chairman of Heilongjiang People's Congress
- In office January 2003 – April 2003
- Preceded by: Wang Jiangong
- Succeeded by: Song Fatang

Minister of Forestry
- In office March 1993 – July 1997
- Preceded by: Gao Dezhan
- Succeeded by: Chen Yaobang

Personal details
- Born: December 1939 (age 86) Guangde County, Anhui, China
- Party: Chinese Communist Party
- Education: Anhui Agricultural University

Xu Youfang (Chinese: 徐有芳; pinyin: Xú Yǒufāng; born December 1939) is a Chinese politician. He was a member of the 15th and 16th Central Committee of the Chinese Communist Party. He was a delegate to the 9th National People's Congress.

== Biography ==
Xu was born in Guangde County (now Guangde), Anhui, in December 1939. In 1959, he entered Anhui Agricultural University, majoring in the Department of Forestry.

After graduating in 1963, he was assigned as an official to Bajiazi Forestry Bureau in northeast China's Jilin province, and worked there for ten years totally. He joined the Chinese Communist Party (CCP) in April 1973. In October 1973, he was dispatched to Jilin Provincial Forestry Department, where he eventually became its deputy head in April 1983.

In January 1985, he was transferred to Beijing and appointed director of Forestry Industry Bureau of the Ministry of Forestry. He moved up the ranks to become vice minister in March 1986 and minister in March 1993.

He was appointed party secretary of Heilongjiang in July 1997, concurrently serving as chairman of Heilongjiang People's Congress since January 2003.

He was chosen as deputy head of the Central Rural Work Leading Group in April 2003, and served until July 2007.

Government offices
Preceded by Gao Dezhan	Minister of Forestry; 1993–1997	Succeeded by Chen Yaobang
Party political offices
Preceded by Yue Qifeng	Party Secretary of Heilongjiang; 1997–2003	Succeeded by Song Fatang
Assembly seats
Preceded by Wang Jiangong	Chairman of Heilongjiang People's Congress; 2003	Succeeded by Song Fatang
