= Li Zhen (female general) =

First female general of the People's Liberation Army

Major General Li Zhen
- 李贞

Personal details
- Born: February 1908 Liuyang County, Hunan, Qing China
- Died: March 11, 1990 Beijing, China
- Spouse(s): Gu Tianshun (m. 1924; div. 1928) Zhang Qilong (m. 1932; div. 1933) Gan Siqi (m. 1935; died 1964)
- Parent: Li Guangtian

Military service
- Allegiance: Chinese Communist Party
- Branch/service: People's Liberation Army Ground Force
- Rank: Major General
- Battles/wars: Autumn Harvest Uprising, Long March, Second Sino-Japanese War, Chinese Civil War, Korean War

Li Zhen (Chinese: 李贞; 1908–1990) was the first female general of the People's Liberation Army.

== Early life ==
Li was born the sixth daughter to a peasant family in rural Liuyang. Her family farmed fields measuring 2 and a half mu and had caught fish to supplement their diet. Until the age of 18, Li was referred to as Danmeizi (Chinese: 旦妹子). At age six, she was sent to live with the family of her intended husband, Gu Tianshun, whose father was a doctor. Li formally married Gu at age 16.

== Revolution ==
In 1926, Danmeizi signed up to Yonghe district women's organisation using the name Li Zhen.

In 1927, Li joined the Chinese Communist Party (CCP), acting as a scout. During this time, Li led a group to collect grain and recruit soldiers. She was based in Yonghe, but remained legally married to Gu. Later that year, a clash between the CCP and the Kuomintang (KMT) resulted in the deaths of several revolutionaries and Li's name being put on a wanted list. As a result, Gu's family severed their ties with Li, sending her mother notification of divorce.

By 1928, Li was a member of the District Committee and deputy secretary of the Party Branch of the Pingliu Guerillas. She became head of the Liudong Guerilla Unit Soldiers' Committee (Chinese: 士兵委员会), later known as the Liuyang County Party Committee (Chinese: 浏阳县委).

When the Autumn Harvest Uprising began in 1928, there were few members of the proletariat willing to join Mao Zedong and Li is credited with rallying members of her troop to join the fighting.

At the beginning of 1929, Li and her guerilla unit were encircled by KMT forces. They fought until night and, with no more bullets, the five surviving members of the troop retreated until they were hemmed in with no escape other than a cliff behind them. Li gave the order to avoid being taken alive and promptly jumped down the cliff. She landed on a tree and, after regaining consciousness, she and one other survivor buried their comrades. Li had been pregnant at the time and she later miscarried. It is popularly believed that this child was Li's with Zhang Qilong, who had been stationed at Liuyang since October 1927. However, documentation suggests that the two only married legally in 1932.

=== The Hunan-Jiangxi Soviet ===
In July 1931, Li moved to the Hunan–Jiangxi Soviet to serve as director of the Provincial Women's Committee (Chinese: 省妇委主任) and political commissar of the Military Medical School (Chinese: 军区医务学校政委). At the same time, Zhang Qilong was posted to the area to oversee the creation of a Hunan-Jiangxi Soviet CCP provincial committee, in the role of vice-chairman of the Provincial Soviet Government.

In the summer of 1933, purges in the Hunan-Jiangxi Soviet intensified in a process now referred to by the CCP as the Wang Ming Leftist Line. In addition to the deaths of many revolutionary cadres, Wang Shoudao was removed from his position as secretary of the Hunan-Jiangxi Soviet CCP provincial committee for, 'severe rightist leanings.' Zhang Qilong was also removed from all his official posts. Not only did Zhang refuse to acknowledge his 'mistakes', but he also spoke in defence of the disgraced chairman of the Provincial Soviet Government, Yuan Desheng (killed whilst incarcerated). Li was encouraged to draw a line between her political life and personal life by denouncing Zhang, which she refused to do. It is debated whether their divorce was initiated by fellow party members or Zhang himself to protect Li from the consequences of his fall.

== The Long March ==
In August 1934, the Red Army prepared to abandon the Hunan-Jiangxi base area and it was suggested to Li by one of her superiors that she remain behind, as, 'fighting was so hard for women.' Li objected to the higher administration and was permitted to continue her work. She was first assigned to the Sixth Red Army under Ren Bishi as the minister of the Organisation Department of the Political Department (Chinese: 红六军团政治部组织部部长). The Sixth Red Army then amalgamated with General He Long's forces to form the Second Red Army. In 1935, the Second Red Army retreated through Sichuan into Tibet to join Zhang Guotao's forces (Fourth Red Army). Early in the year, Li had married her third husband Gan Siqi.

During the Long March, Li was pregnant. Due to the hardships encountered, Li went into labour when only seven months pregnant. Lack of food left Li unable to nurse her child and it soon died. Afterwards, Li was not given time to recuperate, which rendered her unable to have any further children.

== The Second Sino-Japanese War and resumption of civil war ==
During the Second Sino-Japanese War, Li served as president of a school for female officers operated by the Eighth Route Army. After Japan's defeat and the resumption of the Chinese Civil War, Li served as secretary of the People's Liberation Army's Jin-Sui and Northwest military districts.

== People's Republic of China ==
During the Korean War, Li was the secretary of the political department of the People's Volunteer Army.

On 27 September 1955, Li was made Major General of the People's Liberation Army. The ceremony was held at Zhongnanhai. Mao Zedong presented Li with an 1st Class Order of Liberation and Zhou Enlai granted her the rank of Major General. Her husband, Gan Siqi, was promoted to Colonel General alongside her. Li was the first and only female at the time to be raised to the rank of major general.

Although this was considered a major step for gender equality in China, Li's promotion coincided with a restructuring of the People's Liberation Army that saw approximately 100,000 female soldiers decommissioned and returned to civilian lives, with the remaining 10,000 referred to as 'female staff members' in official documentation. In addition, no other women were appointed to the rank of general for another 33 years, until Nie Li and four other women were promoted to junior generals in 1988.
