= Wang Jiadao =

Chinese politician (1916–1992)

Wang Jiadao

Wang Jiadao (Chinese: 汪家道; 1916–1992), a native of Huoqiu County, Anhui, was a Chinese politician and People's Liberation Army major general.

== Biography ==
=== First Nationalist-Communist Civil War ===
In 1930, with the outbreak of the Liuhuo Uprising in western Anhui Province, Wang Jiadao enlisted in the Red Army. In that year, Wang Jiadao became a member of the Communist Youth League of China. During this period, Wang Jiadao functioned as a correspondent, a guard, and a squad leader. In the spring of 1932, upon the formal establishment of the 75th Division of the Red Army in Mabu, Lu'an, Wang Jiadao was appointed as the commander of the communication unit of the 75th Division. In September 1932, he officially joined the Chinese Communist Party and subsequently remained in the E-yu-wan area of Anhui Province to combat the enemy, impede their advance, and facilitate the relocation of the main force of the Fourth Front Army of the Red Army.

On November 11, 1934, during the Huashanzhai meeting, the E-yu-wan committee resolved to comply with directives from the central government and the military committee of the Chinese Revolutionary Committee regarding the transfer of the Red Army. Subsequently, on November 16, Wang Jiadao, accompanied by the Red Army, departed from Hejiachong, Luoshan County, under the banner of the "Second Advance Team of the Chinese Workers, Peasants, and Red Army in the North Against the Japanese" (Chinese: 北上抗日第二先遣队). On July 16, 1935, the Red 25th Army advanced northward from Fengyukou in Chang'an County to perpetuate the Long March. On September 15, the Red 25th Army landed at Yongping Town, Yanchuan County, where it encountered the Red 26th Army and 27th Army in northern Shaanxi Province, subsequently integrating into the Red 15th Army Corps, with Wang Jiadao appointed as the Director of the Political Office of the Cavalry Regiment of the Army Corps.

=== Second Sino-Japanese War ===
In 1937, following the commencement of the Second Sino-Japanese War, the Kuomintang-Communist started a second collaboration, resulting in the reorganization of the Red Army into the Eighth Route Army. The Fifteenth Red Army Corps was transformed into the 344th Brigade of the 115th Division, with Wang Jiadao appointed as the deputy battalion commander of the 687th Regiment. He accompanied the forces to the anti-Japanese front in northeastern Shanxi Province and participated in the Battle of Pingxingguan with his troops in September.

Subsequent to the conflict, Wang Jiadao directed his forces to the Taihang Mountain region to conduct anti-Japanese operations. In the spring of 1938, Wang Jiadao commanded his forces in the engagement at the Shijiazhuang–Taiyuan railway and the confrontations at Zhangdian, supporting the allied troops of the 129th Division in defeating the Japanese army's "Nine Roads of Siege" in the southeastern Shanxi base area. Subsequently, Wang Jiadao proceeded south with the primary contingent of the 344th Brigade to the Jiluyu border region to persist in combat against the Japanese. In May 1940, Wang Jiadao was appointed deputy head of the 8th Regiment of the 3rd Brigade of the Jiluyu Military Region.

In July 1941, the 3rd Brigade was amalgamated into the 7th Brigade of Instruction of the 2nd Column of the Eighth Route Army, with Wang Jiadao initially appointed as the deputy commander of the 19th Regiment of the Brigade, thereafter advancing to the position of head of the Brigade. In December 1942, the Jiluyu Military Region underwent reorganization and assumed leadership of the Brigade, with Wang Jiadao appointed as the deputy head of the 19th Regiment of the Brigade. He then held the position of commander of the independent regiment within the fifth military division of the Jiluyu Military Region, and he subsequently directed the forces in the Battle of Weidong and the Hundred Regiments Offensive.

In the autumn of 1944, pursuant to the CCP Central Committee's strategic directive of "Developing Henan," Wang Jiadao directed his forces southward to the plains of northern Henan, engaging the Japanese and collaborationist military factions in Jiaozuo, Xiuwu, Huixian, Xinxiang, Mixian, Dengfeng, among others, while assaulting the Longhai Railway and the Pinghan Railway. In May 1945, he received orders to direct his forces westward across the Yellow River to secure the Shuidong region. During this era, he commanded his forces to seize the county towns of Fugou and Yanling, thus establishing a link between the Eighth Route Army and the Fourth and Fifth Divisions of the New Fourth Army. In July, the Thirteenth Military Sub-District of Jiluyu was founded, with him serving as the Commander of the Military Sub-District. In August, he commanded his forces to engage in the Great Counter-Offensive against Japan.

=== Second Nationalist-Communist Civil War ===
On August 15, 1945, the anti-Japanese conflict culminated in definitive victory. In November, the Jin-Ji-Lu-Yu military area transferred its major forces to the Ji-Lu-Yu military region to establish the Seventh Column, with Wang Jiadao serving as the deputy brigade commander of the 20th brigade within the column. Subsequently, he advanced north with his forces to engage in the Pinghan Road Battle, successfully seizing Heze and Jining in Shandong Province. The civil war commenced in June 1946. In August, he engaged in the Longhai Road Battle with his forces and seized Dangshan Station. Wang Jiadao was subsequently appointed as the commander of the Independent Brigade (later designated the Independent First Brigade) in the Jiluyu Military Region, where he directed his forces in the Battle of Huaxian, the Battle of Jujinyu, and the North Henan Offensive.

At the conclusion of June 1947, to execute the "Strike Strategy of the Central Plains," the principal forces of the Jin-Ji-Lu-Yu Field Army breached the Kuomintang's Yellow River defenses. Wang Jiadao led the initial clandestine river crossing, dismantled the Kuomintang Joint Logistics Headquarters, and secured control over the Yellow River, specifically the southern bank section between Juancheng and Yuncheng. Subsequently, Wang Jiadao commanded the troops in the Battle of Southwest Shandong, where the first column obliterated Yuncheng, defeating over 15,000 Kuomintang and their Fifty-fifth Division, while obstructing the Kuomintang Wang Jingjiu Regiment's assault, thereby providing substantial support for Liu-Deng army to recuperate and advance southward.

On August 1, 1947, the independent brigade of the Jiluyu Military Region was incorporated into the 11th Column of the Jin-Hei-Lu-Yu Field Army, which was rebranded as the eleventh column of the Central Plains Field Army in May 1948, with Wang serving as the commander of the thirty-first brigade. During this period, Wang Jiadao commanded his forces in the Battle of the Longhai Road, the Battle of East Henan, and the Battle of Huaihai. In February 1949, following the transformation of the Central Plains Field Army into the Second Field Army, Wang assumed command of the Forty-ninth Division of the Seventeenth Army. He directed his troops to the western region of Anhui Province in preparation for the Yangtze River Crossing campaign. On April 21, he led his forces to forcibly cross the Yangtze River west of Anqing, advancing into Jingdezhen via the Dongliu River, subsequently launching an assault on the Zhejiang-Jiangxi Line. In June, he directed his troops to Fujian and Guangdong, coordinating with the Third Field Army's campaign in the Battle of Hengbao and the Battle of Guangdong.

=== People's Republic of China period ===
The People's Republic of China was established on October 1, 1949. In early November, he led the 49th Division as the spearhead of the Fifth Corps, marching into Guizhou along the Hunan-Guizhou Highway. On November 15, he commanded his men to persistently pursue and annihilate the retreating enemy to the southwest, liberating vast lands in Anshun and Xingren in western Guizhou, thus disrupting the carefully established defense line of southwest China by the Kuomintang. In early December, he commanded his forces into Yunnan Province, where his division independently entered Kunming to confront the Lu Han Uprising.

In January 1950, Wang Jiadao assumed the role of Division Commander of the 49th Division and the Xingren Military Sub-district, and was designated as both Division Commander and Commander of the Xingren Military Sub-district. At the conclusion of 1950, he was instructed to attend the inaugural accelerated cadre class of the Nanjing Military Academy. Upon graduating in late 1952, he rejoined the 49th Division as its Division Commander. In October 1955, he was appointed as the Deputy Commander of the PLA 13th Army. In that year, he received the rank of Major General and was given the Second August 1 Medal, the Second Grade Order of Independence and Freedom, and the Second Grade Order of Liberation. In September 1959, he was appointed as the Deputy Commander of the 16th Army. In September 1962, he was appointed as the commander of the Heilongjiang Province Military District. In July 1968, he was designated as the commander of the Heilongjiang Production and Construction Corps. During this period, he directed the Chinese border guards and militia to engage in the self-defense counteroffensive on Zhenbao Island incident to repel the Soviet Union's invasion.

In August 1971, Wang Jiadao was appointed the first secretary of the CCP Heilongjiang Provincial Committee. In 1974, he was reassigned as the deputy commander of the Shenyang Military Region. By 1976, he had become an advisor to the Shenyang Military Region. He departed from his position in 1982 to recuperate, and in 1988, he received the First Class Red Star Medal of Merit and Honor.

Wang Jiadao is a delegate of the fourth session of the National People's Congress, a member of the fifth session of the National Committee of the Chinese People's Political Consultative Conference, and an alternate member of the ninth and tenth sessions of the CCP Central Committee. Wang Jiadao died on March 27, 1992, in Shenyang.

== Extended reading ==
- 山东省地方史志编篡委员会. 《山东省志: 军事志,》. 山东人民出版社. 1996年: 346页.
- 王中兴, 刘立勤. 《第二野战军》. 国防大学出版社. 1996年: 14页. ISBN 9787562607588.
- 王年一. 《大动乱的年代: 『文化大革命』十年史》. 河南人民出版社. 1988年: 188页.

Political offices
| Preceded by Pan Fusheng | Party Secretary of Heilongjiang; 1971–1974 | Succeeded by Liu Guangtao |
| Preceded by Pan Fusheng | Heilongjiang Revolutionary Committee; 1971–1974 | Succeeded by Liu Guangtao |
| Preceded by Zhang Kaiji | Commander of the People's Liberation Army Heilongjiang Military Region; 1962–1975 | Succeeded by Zhao Xianshun |
