= Qibaoshan, Liuyang =

Rural township in Liuyang, Hunan, China

Coordinates: 28.2764°N 113.9486°E

Qibaoshan Township (simplified Chinese: 七宝山乡; traditional Chinese: 七寶山鄉; pinyin: Qibaoshan Xiang) is a rural township in Liuyang City, Changsha City, Hunan Province, People's Republic of China. As of the 2000 census it had a population of 14,746 and an area of 172.2 square kilometers. Qibaoshan merged to Yonghe town on November 18, 2015.

== Cityscape ==
The township is divided into 8 villages, the following areas: Hetang Village, Shengping Village, Baoshan Village, Tieshan Village, Jiangbujiang Village, Shizishan Village, Zengjiatai Village, and Jingquan Village (荷塘村、升平村、宝山村、铁山村、蒋埠江村、狮子山村、增加台村、井泉村).
