= Zhang Qilong =

Chinese politician

Secretary of the Central Commission for Discipline Inspection
- In office 1978–1982

Communist Party Secretary of Heilongjiang
- Succeeded by: Zhao Dezun

Personal details
- Born: 1900 Liuyang, Hunan, Qing China
- Died: 1987 (aged 86–87)
- Party: Chinese Communist Party
- Spouse: Li Zhen (m. 1932; div. 1933)

Zhang Qilong (Chinese: 张启龙; 1900 – June 3, 1987) was a Chinese politician. He was born in Liuyang, Hunan Province. He joined the Chinese Communist Party in 1926 and participated in the Autumn Harvest Uprising of 1927. He was a member of the Chinese Workers' and Peasants' Red Army during the Chinese Civil War, the Eighth Route Army and the People's Liberation Army. In 1933, his party membership was revoked and he divorced his then wife, Li Zhen, to avoid implicating her in his disgrace. He was allowed back into the party in 1936. After the creation of the People's Republic of China, he was the first party chief for Heilongjiang Province.

Preceded by New office	Communist Party Secretary of Heilongjiang	Succeeded by Zhao Dezun
