= Nie Li =

Lieutenant General of the PLA

Lieutenant General Nie Li
- 聂力

Personal details
- Born: September 1930 (age 95) Shanghai, Republic of China
- Spouse: Ding Henggao (丁衡高)
- Children: Nie Fei (聶菲)
- Parent(s): Nie Rongzhen; Zhang Ruihua (张瑞华)

Military service
- Allegiance: China
- Branch/service: People's Liberation Army Ground Force
- Rank: Lt General

Nie Li (born September 1930) is a retired Lieutenant General of the Chinese People's Liberation Army and the first woman to hold the rank.

== Early life ==
Nie was born in Shanghai in 1930. She was the daughter of Nie Rongzhen, who was a Marshal of the PLA, and Zhang Ruihua. As her father was from Jiangjin, Sichuan, she is considered a Jiangjin native by Chinese convention. When she was four years old, Nie was imprisoned along with her mother by the Kuomintang. They were released two years later and Zhang Ruihua sent her daughter to be raised with a family in the countryside. At age 14, Nie was sent to work in a cotton mill.

== Education ==
Zhou Enlai dispatched people to take Nie to a Communist-controlled area in Beijing in 1945. On arrival, 15-year-old Nie entered the first year of elementary school. In 1955, Nie went to Leningrad to study at the Leningrad Institute of Fine Mechanics and Optics. She graduated and returned to China in 1960.

== Career ==
On her return, Nie was assigned as a technician to a lab in the Ministry of National Defense of the People's Republic of China, researching missile technology. Over the years, Nie held various roles in the Ministry's Fifth Institute (Chinese: 五院; pinyin: wǔyuàn), as well as the Ministry of Aerospace Industry and Ministry of Science and Technology. She worked on projects including the earliest Yuan Wang-class tracking ship, launched in 1977, as well as the first Chinese supercomputers, Yinhe models I and II, throughout the 1980s and early 1990s.

In 1988, Nie was presented with the rank of major general. Nie and another four women promoted at this time were the first female generals since Li Zhen's commission in 1955. Nie was promoted to lieutenant general on 24 July 1993.

She served twice as deputy chairperson on the All-China Women's Federation. Nie was a representative at the 7th National People's Congress, as well as the 8th National People's Congress.

== Personal life ==
Nie met Ding Henggao whilst studying in Leningrad. The two married in 1962 in Guangzhou and the ceremony was described by Tao Siliang, Tao Zhu's daughter, as, "solemn and also so simple." At the time, people were surprised that the daughter of a marshal had not married someone of equal or higher status. Ding was later awarded the rank of full general. Nie and Ding had one daughter.
