= Chen Lei (Heilongjiang) =

Chinese politician

- 黑龙江

Vice Governor of Heilongjiang Province
- In office 1979–1985

Personal details
- Born: 1917 Huachuan County, Heilongjiang Province
- Died: December 5, 2006 (aged 88–89)
- Party: Chinese Communist Party
- Awards: Faithful Communist Veteran

Chen Lei (Chinese: 陈雷) (1917 – December 5, 2006) was a Chinese politician. He was born in Huachuan County, Heilongjiang Province. He was governor of his home province two separate times. Lei played a significant role in the Cultural Revolution while serving in the Heilongjiang Revolutionary Committee. He died on December 5, 2006 in Harbin at the age of 89 due to a prolonged illness.

== Early life and career ==
Chen Lei was born in 1917 in Huachuan County, Heilongjiang Province. His birth name was Jiang Shiyuan.

He joined the Chinese Communist Party in February 1936. He became a member of Northeast Counter-Japanese United Army where he was active in resisting the Japanese occupation in Manchuria.

After the People's Republic of China was established in 1949, Chen served in a series of key government positions in Heilongjiang. From 1956 to 1967, he served as the Vice Governor of Heilongjiang Province where he played a significant role in agricultural reforms and overseeing rural development initiatives.

During the Cultural Revolution, Chen joined the Heilongjiang Revolutionary Committee established by the Red Guards and the Chinese Communist Party. He was ousted from the committee in 1969 after being labeled as a part of a "counter-revolutionary group".

Preceded by Zhao Dezun	Governor of Heilongjiang	Succeeded by Han Guang
Preceded by Yang Yichen	Governor of Heilongjiang; 1979	Succeeded by Hou Jie
