= Li Fanwu =

Chinese politician

Li Fanwu (Chinese: 李范五; May 3, 1912 – 1986) original name Li Fude (Chinese: 李福德), also known as Zhang Song (Chinese: 张松), was a political leader in the People's Republic of China. He was born in Muling, Mudanjiang, Heilongjiang Province. He was governor of his home province. He was a delegate to the 3rd National People's Congress

| Preceded by Ouyang Qin | Governor of Heilongjiang | Succeeded by Pan Fusheng |
