= Li Li'an =

Chinese politician

- 李力安

Secretary-General of the Central Advisory Commission
- In office October 1987 – October 1992
- Chairperson: Chen Yun
- Preceded by: Rong Gaotang
- Succeeded by: Position revoked

First Party Secretary of Heilongjiang
- In office July 1983 – October 1985
- Preceded by: Yang Yichen
- Succeeded by: Sun Weiben

First Party Secretary of Harbin
- In office August 1981 – February 1983
- Preceded by: Wen Minsheng
- Succeeded by: Wang Zhao

Personal details
- Born: July 19, 1920 Wutai County, Shanxi, China
- Died: 2 January 2023 (aged 102) Beijing, China
- Party: Chinese Communist Party

Chinese name
- Chinese: 李力安
Transcriptions
Standard Mandarin
- Hanyu Pinyin: Li Li'an

Zhao Liangsheng
- Traditional Chinese: 趙亮生
- Simplified Chinese: 赵亮生
Transcriptions
Standard Mandarin
- Hanyu Pinyin: Zhao Liangsheng

Li Li'an (Chinese: 李力安; pinyin: Lǐ Lì'ān; 19 July 1920 – 2 January 2023), courtesy name Zibin (子斌), was a Chinese politician who served as first party secretary of Harbin from 1981 to 1983, first party secretary of Heilongjiang from 1983 to 1985, and secretary-general of the Central Advisory Commission from 1987 to 1992. He was a delegate to the 5th National People's Congress. He was a representative of the 12th, 13th, and 14th National Congress of the Chinese Communist Party. He was a member of the 12th Central Committee of the Chinese Communist Party.

== Biography ==
Li was born Zhao Liangsheng (赵亮生) in Wutai County, Shanxi, on 19 July 1920.

Li joined the Chinese Communist Party (CCP) in October 1935 and engaged in the underground work of the party. He was head of the United Front Work Department of the CCP Wutai County Committee in October 1937 and subsequently head of the Organization Department of the CCP Shanxi-Chahar-Hebei Regional Committee in 1948.

After the liberation of Ankang in 1949, Li was appointed deputy party secretary of Ankang, in addition to serving as head of the Organization Department of the CCP Ankang Municipal Committee.

Li was made director of the Allocation Division of the Organization Department of the Chinese Communist Party in 1960 and was promoted to its deputy head in August 1964. During the Cultural Revolution, he suffered political persecution and was sent to the May Seventh Cadre Schools to do farm works. He was reinstated as party secretary of Heilongjiang in July 1972. He was appointed second party secretary of Heilongjiang in 1981, concurrently serving as first party secretary of Harbin. In February 1983, he was promoted to become first party secretary of Heilongjiang, and served until October 1985. He was chosen as secretary-general of the Central Advisory Commission in October 1987, serving in the post until its dissolution in October 1992. He also served as president of the Institute of Contemporary China Studies between 1993 and 2000.

On 2 January 2023, Li died in Beijing at the age of 102.

Party political offices
Preceded by Wen Minsheng	First Party Secretary of Harbin; 1981–1983	Succeeded by Wang Zhao
Preceded by Yang Yichen	First Party Secretary of Heilongjiang; 1983–1985	Succeeded by Sun Weiben
Preceded by Rong Gaotang	Secretary-General of the Central Advisory Commission; 1987–1992	Succeeded by Position revoked
Non-profit organization positions
New title	President of the Institute of Comtemporary China Studies; 1993–2000	Succeeded by Zhu Jiamu
