= Guo Linxiang =

- 郭林祥

Political Commissar of the Nanjing Military Region
- In office January 1978 – June 1985
- Commander: Xiang Shouzhi
- Preceded by: Liao Hansheng
- Succeeded by: Fu Kuiqing

Political Commissar of the Xinjiang Military District
- In office August 1975 – January 1978
- Commander: Yang Yong; Liu Zhen
- Preceded by: Cao Siming
- Succeeded by: Ismail Amat

Political Commissar of the People's Liberation Army General Logistics Department
- In office August 1973 – August 1975
- Head: Zhang Zongxun
- Preceded by: Zhang Chiming
- Succeeded by: Wang Ping

Personal details
- Born: September 1914 Yongfeng County, Jiangxi, China
- Died: 25 April 2010 (aged 95) Beijing, China
- Party: Chinese Communist Party

Military service
- Allegiance: People's Republic of China
- Branch/service: Chinese Red Army; Eighth Route Army; People's Liberation Army Ground Force
- Years of service: 1930–1992
- Rank: General
- Battles/wars: Chinese Civil War; Second Sino-Japanese War
- Awards: August 1 Medal (2nd Class); Order of Independence and Freedom (2nd Class); Order of Liberation (1st Class)

Guo Linxiang (Chinese: 郭林祥; pinyin: Guō Línxiáng; September 1914 – 25 April 2010) was a general in the People's Liberation Army of China who served as political commissar of the People's Liberation Army General Logistics Department from 1973 to 1975 and political commissar of the Nanjing Military Region from 1982 to 1985.

== Biography ==
Guo was born in Yongfeng County, Jiangxi, in September 1914. He became a member of the Chinese Communist Party (CCP) in 1933. He had served in the Red Army since 1930, serving in the Encirclement campaigns from 1930 to 1934 and the Long March from 1934 to 1936. During the Second Sino-Japanese War, he fought under deputy commander Peng Dehuai at the Hundred Regiments Offensive. During the Chinese Civil War, he served in the war and engaged in the Battle of Huaiyin, Battle of Lian River, Battle of Yancheng, Battle of South Shandong, Battle of Laiwu, Menglianggu campaign, Battle of Linfen, Battle of Central Shanxi, and Battle of Taiyuan.

After establishment of the Communist State in 1949, he mainly served in the Sichuan Military District. He was awarded the military rank of major general (shaojiang) in 1955. In 1966, the Cultural Revolution broke out, he was removed from office and effectively sidelined. After the Lin Biao incident, he was reinstated as political commissar of the People's Liberation Army General Logistics Department in August 1973. He was transferred as political commissar to northwest China's Xinjiang Military District in August 1975, and held that office until January 1978. In January 1980, he was promoted to become first political commissar of the Nanjing Military Region (later as political commissar in October 1982), a position he held until June 1985. In 1987, he was appointed secretary of the Commission for Discipline Inspection of the Central Military Commission, responsible for rectifying discipline in the People's Liberation Army (PLA). He attained the rank of general (shangjiang) in 1988. He retired in 1992.

On 25 April 2010, he died from an illness in Beijing, at the age of 95.

== Autobiography ==
- 郭林祥回忆录 [Memoirs of Guo Linxiang] (in Chinese). PLA Press: Beijing. 2003. ISBN 9787506544313.

Military offices
Preceded by Zhang Chiming	Political Commissar of the People's Liberation Army General Logistics Department; 1973–1975	Succeeded by Wang Ping
Preceded by Cao Siming	Political Commissar of the Xinjiang Military District; 1975–1978	Succeeded by Ismail Amat
Preceded by Liao Hansheng	Political Commissar of the Nanjing Military Region; 1978–1985	Succeeded by Fu Kuiqing
