= Yonghe, Liuyang =

Yonghe Town 永和镇
- Town
- Location in Hunan
- Coordinates: 28°17′35″N 113°51′03″E
- Country: People's Republic of China
- Province: Hunan
- Prefecture-level city: Changsha
- County-level city: Liuyang

Area
  - Total: 234.5 km^{2} (90.5 sq mi)

Population (2015)
  - Total: 40,000
  - Density: 170/km^{2} (440/sq mi)
- Time zone: UTC+8 (China Standard)
- Postal code: 410306
- Area code: 0731

Yonghe Town (simplified Chinese: 永和镇; traditional Chinese: 永和鎮; pinyin: Yǒnghé Zhèn) is a rural town in Liuyang City, Hunan Province, People's Republic of China. It is surrounded by the towns of Guandu and Zhangfang on the north, Yanxi Town on the northwest, Gugang Town on the west, Xiaohe Township on the east, and the towns of Gaoping and Zhonghe on the south. As of the 2015 census it had a population of 40,000 and an area of 234.5 square kilometres (90.5 sq mi). Qibaoshan Township was merged to Yonghe town on November 18, 2015.

== Administrative divisions ==
The town is divided into 10 villages and one community, which include the following areas:

- Juxiang Community (菊香社区)
- Jiacheng Village (佳成村)
- Shijia Village (石佳村)
- Jinpen Village (金盆村)
- Jingquan Village (井泉村)
- Tieshan Village (铁山村)
- Shizishan Village (狮子山村)
- Shengping Village (升平村)
- Zengjiatai Village (增加台村)
- Qibaoshan Village (七宝山村)

== Geography ==
The Daxi River (大溪河), flows northeast to southwest through the town.

The Zhushuqiao Reservoir (株树桥水库) is the largest body of water in the town. The reservoir provides drinking water and water for irrigation.

Mount Tianyan (天岩寨) is situated at the town, its peak elevation is 566.6 metres (1,859 ft).

== Economy ==
Yonghe Town's economy is based on nearby mineral resources, such as chrysanthemum stone, meerschaum, copper, iron, and phosphorus.

== Education ==
Nowadays, Yonghe Town has two public middle school: Yonghe Middle School, as well as Qibaoshan Middle School.

== Transportation ==
=== County Road ===
The County Road X003 runs through the town.

=== Expressway ===
The Changsha–Liuyang Expressway, from Changsha, running through the towns of Dongyang, Jiaoxi, Gugang, Sankou, Guandu, Zhangfang to Jiangxi.

=== Railway ===
The Liling–Liuyang railway (醴浏铁路)'s terminus is located in the town. It was removed in 2004.

== Attractions ==
The main attractions are the Grand House of Li Family (李家大屋) and White Horse Isle Wetland (白马洲湿地).

== Notable people ==
- Li Zhen (female general), the first female general of the People's Liberation Army.
- Tang Liang, a general in the People's Liberation Army.
- Zhang Qilong (张启龙), politician.
