= Gan Siqi =

Chinese general (1903–1964)

- 甘泗淇
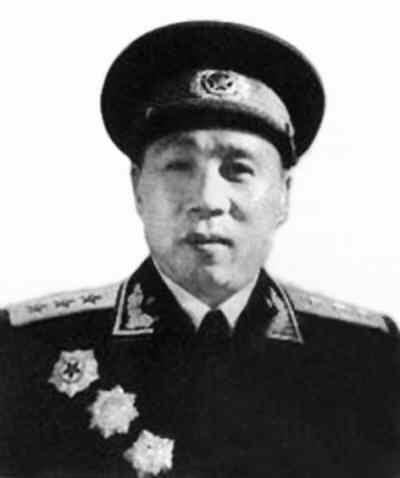
- Born: 1903; Ningxiang, Hunan Province, China
- Died: 1964 (aged 60–61)
- Other names: Jiang Fengwei; Jiang Bingkun
- Occupation: General
- Political party: Chinese Communist Party
- Spouse: Li Zhen (m. 1935–1964)

Gan Siqi (Chinese: 甘泗淇; pinyin: Gān Sìqì; May 1903 – February 1964), born as Jiang Fengwei (Chinese: 姜凤威; pinyin: Jiāng Fèngwēi), other name Jiang Bingkun (Chinese: 姜炳坤; pinyin: Jiāng Bǐngkūn), was a general of the People's Liberation Army of China.

Gan was born in Ningxiang, Hunan Province. He joined the Communist Youth League in 1925, and joined the Chinese Communist Party in 1926. He went to the Soviet Union in 1927 to study at Moscow Sun Yat-sen University. He came back in 1930, and became political director in Red Six Army Group and Red Two Army Group. He participated in the Long March.

During the Second Sino-Japanese War, he was the director of political department of 120 division of Eighth Route Army.

During the Chinese Civil War, he was the director of political department in No. 1 Field Army.

After formation of the People's Republic of China, he was the vice political commissar and director of political department of Chinese People's Volunteer Army. Later he became vice director of the General Political Department of PLA.

He was made a general in 1955.

He was a delegate to the 1st National People's Congress, a deputy of 7th National Congress of the Chinese Communist Party, and an alternate member of 8th Central Committee of the Chinese Communist Party.

His wife, Li Zhen, was the first female major general in PRC.
