= Sun Weiben =

Chinese politician (1928–2020)

- 孙维本

Party Secretary of Heilongjiang
- In office October 1985 – April 1994
- Preceded by: Li Li'an
- Succeeded by: Yue Qifeng

Chairman of the Standing Committee of the Heilongjiang People's Congress
- In office January 1988 – January 1998
- Preceded by: Li Jianbai
- Succeeded by: Wang Jiangong

Party Secretary of Liaoning
- In office March 1982 – October 1985

Personal details
- Born: November 19, 1928 Gaizhou, Liaoning, China
- Died: December 18, 2020 (aged 92) Harbin, Heilongjiang, China
- Party: Chinese Communist Party

Chinese name
- Traditional Chinese: 孫維本
- Simplified Chinese: 孙维本
Transcriptions
Standard Mandarin
- Hanyu Pinyin: Sūn Wéiběn

Sun Weiben (Chinese: 孙维本; 19 November 1928 – 18 December 2020) was a Chinese politician who served as Party Secretary of Heilongjiang from 1985 to 1994 and Chairman of the Standing Committee of the Heilongjiang People's Congress from 1988 to 1998. He spent most of his career in northeast China's Liaoning province before becoming top leader of neighboring Heilongjiang province. He was a member of the 12th, 13th and 14th Central Committee of the Chinese Communist Party. He was a delegate to the 5th, 6th, 7th, 8th, 9th, 10th and 11th National People's Congress. He was a deputy to the 18th and 19th National Congress of the Chinese Communist Party.

== Biography ==
Sun was born in Gaizhou, Liaoning, on November 19, 1928. He joined the Chinese Communist Party in October 1947.

Before entering politics in March 1951, he was an accountant. He spent ten years in the Organization Department of CCP Shenyang Municipal Committee. He was Party Secretary of Xifeng County in January 1961, and held that office until July 1965. Then he was appointed Party Secretary of Kaiyuan County, but having held the position for only twenty months. In March 1967, at the dawn of the Cultural Revolution, he suffered political persecution and was sent to the May Seventh Cadre School to do farm works. In May 1970, he was appointed Deputy Party Secretary of Faku County, a position he held until April 1974. Then he became Party Secretary of Xifeng County again. He became Party Secretary of Tieling in February 1976, and served until March 1982. He became a member of the Standing Committee of the CCP Liaoning Provincial Committee and rose to become Party Secretary of Liaoning (deputy leader) in March 1982.

In the autumn of 1985, he was transferred from his job in Liaoning province to neighboring Heilongjiang province. He was promoted to be Party Secretary of Heilongjiang in October 1985, concurrently holding the Chairman of the Standing Committee of the Heilongjiang People's Congress position since January 1988.

On December 18, 2020, he died of illness in Harbin, Heilongjiang, aged 92.

Party political offices
Preceded by Li Li'an	Party Secretary of Heilongjiang; 1985–1994	Succeeded by Yue Qifeng
Assembly seats
Preceded by Li Jianbai	Chairman of the Standing Committee of the Heilongjiang People's Congress; 1988–1998	Succeeded by Wang Jiangong
