= Code of Conduct for Intraparty Political Life =

Chinese Communist Party document

- Simplified Chinese: 关于党内政治生活的若干准则
- Traditional Chinese: 關於黨內政治生活的若干準則
Transcriptions
Standard Mandarin
- Hanyu Pinyin: Guānyú Dǎngnèi Zhèngzhì Shēnghuó de Ruògān Zhǔnzé

The Code of Conduct for Intraparty Political Life is a document adopted by the fifth plenary session of the 11th Central Committee of the Chinese Communist Party on 29 February 1980. Its purpose is to restore the discipline and style of the CCP Central Committee after the turmoil of the Cultural Revolution. In 1978, during the period of Boluan Fanzheng, Hu Yaobang, Head of the Organization Department of the CCP Central Committee and Vice President of the Central Party School, first proposed to formulate guidelines for political life within the Party. In 1980, the fifth plenary session of the 11th CCP Central Committee also made a resolution to rehabilitate former State Chairman Liu Shaoqi, and elected Hu Yaobang and Zhao Ziyang as members of the Politburo Standing Committee, and restored the Secretariat of the CCP Central Committee with Hu Yaobang as General Secretary.

== Content ==
This includes twelve principles:

1. Adhere to the Party's political and ideological line;
2. Uphold collective leadership and oppose individual autocracy;
3. Uphold the Party's centralized unity and strictly abide by Party discipline;
4. Uphold Party principles and eradicate factionalism;
5. Speak the truth and be consistent in word and deed;
6. Promote intra-party democracy and properly handle differing opinions;
7. Protect the rights of Party members from infringement;
8. Elections must fully reflect the will of the voters;
9. Fight against erroneous tendencies and bad people and bad deeds;
10. Treat comrades who make mistakes properly;
11. Accept the supervision of the Party and the people;
12. Study hard and strive to be both politically sound and professionally competent.
