= Yang Yichen (politician) =

Chinese politician

- 杨易辰

Procurator-General of the Supreme People's Procuratorate
- In office 20 June 1983 – 9 April 1988
- Preceded by: Huang Huoqing
- Succeeded by: Liu Fuzhi

Party Secretary of Heilongjiang
- In office December 1977 – February 1983
- Preceded by: Liu Guangtao
- Succeeded by: Li Li'an

Chairman of the Heilongjiang Revolutionary Committee
- In office December 1977 – December 1979
- Preceded by: Liu Guangtao
- Succeeded by: Office abolished

Chairman of the Heilongjiang Provincial Committee of the Chinese People's Political Consultative Conference
- In office December 1977 – December 1979
- Preceded by: Ouyang Qin
- Succeeded by: Wang Yilun

Personal details
- Born: March 31, 1914 Faku County, Liaoning, China
- Died: 28 June 1997 (aged 83) China
- Party: Chinese Communist Party

Chinese name
- Simplified Chinese: 杨易辰
- Traditional Chinese: 楊易辰
Transcriptions
Standard Mandarin
- Hanyu Pinyin: Yáng Yìchén

Yang Yichen (Chinese: 杨易辰; pinyin: Yáng Yìchén; March 31, 1914 – June 28, 1997) was a politician of the People's Republic of China.

== Biography ==
Yang Yichen was born in Faku County, Liaoning in 1914.

After the Cultural Revolution, Yang was the Secretary of the Heilongjiang Provincial Committee of the Chinese Communist Party. He was the Procurator-General of the Supreme People's Procuratorate from 1983 to 1988.

Yang was a member of the 11th and 12th CPC Central Committee from 1977 to 1987.

Yang Yichen died in Beijing on June 28, 1997.

== Notes ==
Political offices
| Preceded by Liu Guangtao | Governor of Heilongjiang; 1977–1979 | Succeeded by Chen Lei |
| Preceded by Liu Guangtao | Party Secretary of Heilongjiang; 1977–1983 | Succeeded by Li Li'an |
| Preceded by Huang Huoqing | Procurator-General of the Supreme People's Procuratorate; 1983–1988 | Succeeded by Liu Fuzhi |
