= Pan Fusheng =

Chinese Communist revolutionary (1908–1980)

- 潘复生
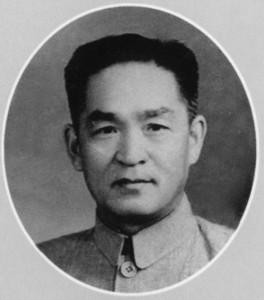

First Secretary of Heilongjiang (Head of Revolutionary Committee 1966–71)
- In office 1965–1971
- Preceded by: Ouyang Qin
- Succeeded by: Wang Jiadao

First Secretary of Henan
- In office 1952–1958
- Preceded by: Zhang Xi
- Succeeded by: Wu Zhipu

First Secretary of the Pingyuan
- In office August 1949 – March 1950
- Succeeded by: Wu De

Personal details
- Born: December 1908 Wendeng, Shandong
- Died: April 1980 (aged 71) Harbin, Heilongjiang
- Party: Chinese Communist Party

Pan Fusheng (Chinese: 潘复生; December 1908 – April 1980) was a Chinese Communist revolutionary and politician. He was the first party secretary of the short-lived Pingyuan Province of the People's Republic of China, and also served as the First Secretary (i.e. party chief) of Henan and Heilongjiang provinces.

During the Great Leap Forward, Pan sympathized with Marshal Peng Dehuai, a critic of Mao Zedong's collectivization policy. As a result, in 1958, he was dismissed as party chief of Henan and subjected to persecution, but was later rehabilitated.

When the Cultural Revolution began, Pan, then party chief of Heilongjiang province, embraced the rebel Red Guards movement and gained the support of Mao. However, he was soon involved in major factional violence, and was dismissed again in 1971 and put under investigation. In 1982, the Chinese Communist Party posthumously criticized him for committing "serious mistakes" during the Cultural Revolution.

== Republic of China ==
Pan Fusheng was born in December 1908 to a poor peasant family in Wendeng, Shandong province. His original name was Liu Kaijun (Chinese: 刘开浚), and courtesy name Juchuan (巨川). Pan was an excellent student in Wendeng County Senior Elementary School, and was admitted to Wendeng County Normal School with the highest score in the entrance examination; however, he was later forced to drop out owing to poverty, and taught in a rural senior elementary school for five years.

In 1929, he was admitted to the Shandong Number One Rural Normal School, where he was influenced by communist classmates, and joined the Chinese Communist Party (CCP) in 1931. After the Mukden Incident, which led to the Japanese occupation of Manchuria, Pan organized the Shandong students to join the anti-Japanese and anti-Kuomintang (KMT) protests in the capital Nanjing. In March 1932, he was arrested by the KMT government and held at the Jinan Number One Prison. He was sentenced to ten years for "endangering the Republic", but was released in late 1937, after the eruption of the Second Sino-Japanese War.

After his release from prison, Pan organized and led the Communist guerrillas in Shandong, and later became a leader of the Hebei–Shandong–Henan (Ji–Lu–Yu) revolutionary base area. He participated in the Second Sino-Japanese War and the subsequent Chinese Civil War against the KMT government.

== Early PRC ==
In August 1949, just before the official establishment of the People's Republic of China, Pan Fusheng was appointed Communist Party Secretary of the newly established Pingyuan Province. In March 1950, a number of peasants and cattle froze to death when transporting grain to government storage in Puyang prefecture. Pan took partial responsibility for the "Puyang Incident" and was demoted to deputy party chief.

In November 1952, Pingyuan Province was abolished, mostly merging into Henan Province. Pan Fusheng became the party chief (then called First Secretary) of Henan, succeeding Zhang Xi, and the Political Commissar of the Henan Military District. In September 1956, he was elected as an alternate member of the 8th Central Committee of the Chinese Communist Party.

== Great Leap Forward ==
During the Anti-Rightist Movement and the Great Leap Forward, Pan Fusheng sympathized with Marshal Peng Dehuai, who criticized Mao's disastrous collectivization policies. As a result, he became a major target of persecution by the fervent Mao loyalist Wu Zhipu, the Second Secretary of Henan, with the approval of the Central Committee of the Chinese Communist Party.

During the 9th plenum of the Henan Provincial Party Congress in June 1958, Pan Fusheng and two lower-ranking officials, Yang Jue and Wang Tingdong, were denounced as the "Pan, Yang, Wang right-deviating anti-party clique", and subjected to brutal struggle sessions. In October 1958, the CCP calculated that some 1.6 billion big-character posters denouncing them had been written. People who did not put up posters risked being labelled "little Pan Fusheng". Pan was dismissed from office and sent to work as a laborer on a farm. Wu Zhipu replaced Pan as First Secretary of Henan and zealously implemented Mao's collectivization policy. Under Wu's leadership, Henan was one of the worst affected provinces during the Great Chinese Famine, with nearly 3 million people starving to death from 1959 to 1961.

After the end of the Great Leap Forward, Pan was rehabilitated in 1962 and became the minister-level director of the All China Federation of Supply and Marketing Cooperatives.

== Cultural Revolution ==
In October 1965, Pan Fusheng was appointed First Secretary of Heilongjiang Province in Northeast China and Political Commissar of the Heilongjiang Military District. The Cultural Revolution erupted shortly afterwards, and on 31 January 1967, Heilongjiang became the first province to set up a revolutionary committee. By enthusiastically embracing the "power seizure" movement by the rebel Red Guards, Pan was able to gain Mao's support and became a well-known figure throughout China. During the Cultural Revolution, Pan became chairman of the Heilongjiang revolutionary committee in March 1967, one of the only three provincial party chiefs in the country to have transformed from an incumbent provincial First Secretary to head of the revolutionary committee. This was considered a rare feat, as the vast majority of provincial First Secretaries were overthrown through power seizures by radicals and Red Guards, or were removed from power through other means. In April 1968, Pan was elected a member of the Central Committee of the Chinese Communist Party, and in April 1969, he became a member of the Central Military Commission.

Soon after the establishment of the revolutionary committee, however, a faction opposing Pan emerged and sought to remove him from power. Pan became involved in factional violence. He jailed people from the rival faction, including party members and ordinary people. His supporters and opponents fought each other in major armed conflicts, and Pan had serious disagreements with the local military leadership. In June 1971, the central government dismissed him from his posts and put him under investigation.

== Death ==
In April 1980, Pan died of a stroke in Harbin. In 1982, the CCP Central Committee issued a statement criticizing Pan for committing "serious mistakes" during the Cultural Revolution.

Political offices
New title	Party Secretary of Pingyuan; 1949–1950	Succeeded by Wu De
Preceded by Zhang Xi	Party Secretary of Henan; 1952–1958	Succeeded by Wu Zhipu
Preceded by Ouyang Qin	Party Secretary of Heilongjiang; 1965–1971	Succeeded by Wang Jiadao
