= Liu Lanbo =

Chinese politician

Liu Lanbo (Chinese: 刘澜波; 1904 – 5 March 1982) was a Communist revolutionary and politician of the People's Republic of China. He served as Chairman (Governor) of Liaodong Province, and twice as Minister of Electric Power.

== Biography ==
Liu Lanbo was born in 1904 in Fengcheng, Liaoning. His name at birth was Liu Yutian (劉玉田), and Lanbo was his courtesy name. He attended Tianjin Nankai High School and Peking University, but did not graduate. He joined the Chinese Communist Party in December 1928, and participated in the Second Sino-Japanese War.

After the establishment of the Communist victory in the Chinese Civil War, Liu served as the first Chairman (Governor) of the newly established Liaodong Province from June 1949 until April 1950, when he became Vice Minister of Fuel Industry. In July 1955 he was appointed Minister of Electric Power, but in March 1958 became Vice Minister of Water Resources and Electric Power when the two ministries were merged.

Liu was dismissed from his posts and was persecuted during the Cultural Revolution. After the end of the Cultural Revolution, he was rehabilitated and again served as Minister of Electric Power from February 1978 to September 1981. It was owing to his strong recommendation that Li Peng, then one of the twelve vice ministers, succeeded him as Minister of Electric Power.

Liu died in Beijing on 5 March 1982.

Liu Lanbo was the youngest brother of Liu Duoquan (劉多荃), the Kuomintang governor of Rehe (Jehol) Province.
