= Wang Xiankui =

Chinese politician

- 王宪魁
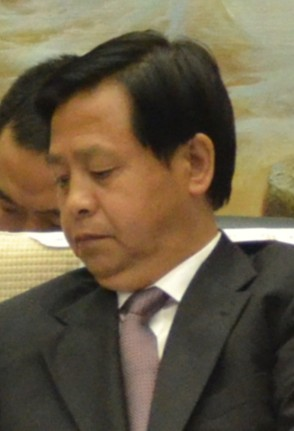
- Wang in 2012

Party Secretary of Heilongjiang
- In office 20 March 2013 – 1 April 2017
- Preceded by: Ji Bingxuan
- Succeeded by: Zhang Qingwei

Governor of Heilongjiang
- In office 27 August 2010 – 25 March 2013
- Preceded by: Li Zhanshu
- Succeeded by: Lu Hao

Personal details
- Born: July 1952 (age 74) Cangxian, Hebei, China
- Party: Chinese Communist Party
- Education: Central Party School

Wang Xiankui (Chinese: 王宪魁; born July 1952) is a Chinese politician best known for his terms as governor, then Party Secretary of Heilongjiang, a province in the northeast part of the country. Wang worked in various capacities in the railway system before entering politics in 2003 as the deputy party chief of Gansu province.

== Career ==
Wang Xiankui was born in 1952 in Cang County, Hebei province. He joined the Chinese Communist Party in May 1974. Wang entered the workforce in March 1971 as a railway worker, then train conductor, with the Harbin Railway Bureau in Heilongjiang province. As part of his work in railways, he was stationed in Mudanjiang. He served as Communist Youth League leader, then party chief, of the Mudanjiang train station, then deputy chief of the Mudanjiang Branch of the Harbin Bureau. In 1996, he was named head of the Hohhot Railway Bureau in Inner Mongolia, where he served until January 1999. He was then transferred to work for the Ministry of Railways, where he served as head of the political department.

From 1981 to 1984 Wang studied transportation at East China Jiaotong University and then Southwest Jiaotong University, although his official biography does not list any degrees obtained from these institutions. He is, however, listed as having received a graduate degree from the Central Party School in economic management in 1998, during his tenure as head of the Hohhot Railway Bureau.

In April 2003, Wang was appointed Deputy Communist Party Secretary of Gansu province, and in October 2006 he was transferred to the same position in Jiangxi province. He was transferred yet again in August 2010 to Heilongjiang province, where he was appointed acting governor, succeeding Li Zhanshu. He was formally confirmed as Governor by the Heilongjiang Provincial Congress in November 2010. In March 2013 he was promoted to Party Secretary of Heilongjiang, succeeding Ji Bingxuan, who became a Vice Chairman of the National People's Congress. Wang was replaced as Governor by Lu Hao.

Wang was an alternate member of the 17th Central Committee, and a full member of the 18th Central Committee of the Chinese Communist Party.

Party political offices
| Preceded by Ji Bingxuan | Party Secretary of Heilongjiang; 2013–2017 | Succeeded by Zhang Qingwei |
Government offices
| Preceded by Li Zhanshu | Governor of Heilongjiang; 2010–2013 | Succeeded by Lu Hao |
