= 11th Central Committee of the Chinese Communist Party =

The 11th Central Committee of the Chinese Communist Party was in a five-year session from 1977 to 1982. The 10th Central Committee of the Chinese Communist Party preceded it. It held seven plenary sessions in the five-year period. It was formally succeeded by the 12th Central Committee of the Chinese Communist Party.

It elected the 11th Politburo of the Chinese Communist Party in 1977. It was the first Politburo elected after Mao Zedong's death in 1976. This politburo was the first to discuss China's reform and opening up, from the preceding period of high economic control.

222 individuals served as members and 132 as alternates this electoral term.

== Chronology ==
1. 1st Plenary Session
  - Date: August 18, 1977
  - Location: Beijing
  - Significance: Hua Guofeng was appointed Chairman of the CCP Central Committee, with Ye Jianying, Deng Xiaoping, Li Xiannian and Wang Dongxing as vice-chairmen. Hua was also appointed Chairman of the CCP Central Military Commission. 32-member Politburo (the largest ever), five-member Politburo Standing Committee and other central organs were elected.
2. 2nd Plenary Session
  - Date: February 18–23, 1978
  - Location: Beijing
  - Significance: The agenda was the preparation of the 5th National People's Congress and the 5th National Committee of the Chinese People's Political Consultative Conference. The 1978 Constitution of the People's Republic of China, reports to the NPC, nominees for top State posts and the new lyrics of the National Anthem praising Mao Zedong were approved.
3. 3rd Plenary Session
  - Date: December 18–22, 1978
  - Location: Beijing
  - Significance: Official criticism of the Cultural Revolution started, and a new economic program aiming to economic reforms was approved. Hua Guofeng renounced to his "Two Whatevers", and he was criticized for promoting personality cult. Chen Yun was appointed additional vice-chairman and Standing Committee member, and also head of the re-created Central Commission for Discipline Inspection. This session is considered the beginning of Deng Xiaoping's paramount leadership.
4. 4th Plenary Session
  - Date: September 25–28, 1979
  - Location: Beijing
  - Significance: Preparations were made for the 30th anniversary of the People's Republic of China. A Decision of the Central Committee of the Chinese Communist Party On the Question of Speeding Up Agricultural Development was adopted. Peng Zhen, one of the top officials purged during the Cultural Revolution, was elected to the Politburo.
5. 5th Plenary Session
  - Date: February 23–29, 1980
  - Location: Beijing
  - Significance: Code of Conduct for Intraparty Political Life was adopted. Liu Shaoqi was completely rehabilitated. The Secretariat of the CCP Central Committee was re-established with Hu Yaobang as General Secretary. Former Maoists including Wu De and Chen Xilian resigned. Article 45 of the State Constitution was amended by removing the citizens' right to "speak out freely, air their views fully, hold great debates and write dazibao". The decision to convene the 12th Party Congress was adopted.
6. 6th Plenary Session
  - Date: June 27–29, 1981
  - Location: Beijing
  - Significance: The Resolution on Certain Questions in the History of Our Party Since the Founding of the People's Republic of China was adopted, heavily criticising the Cultural Revolution and Mao Zedong's theory of continuing revolution under proletarian dictatorship (as opposed to collective party rule). Hua Guofeng resigned (though he was re-elected a junior vice-chairman), replaced by Hu Yaobang as Chairman of the Central Committee and Deng Xiaoping as Chairman of the Central Military Commission.
7. 7th Plenary Session
  - Date: August 6, 1982
  - Location: Beijing
  - Significance: Preparations were made for the 12th Party Congress.
