= Fu Kuiqing =

Chinese lieutenant general and politician (1920–2022)

- 傅奎清

Political Commissar of the Nanjing Military Region
- In office June 1985 – April 1990
- Commander: Xiang Shouzhi
- Preceded by: Guo Linxiang
- Succeeded by: Shi Yuxiao

Personal details
- Born: Fu Yixian; 28 November 1920 Yingshan County, Hubei, China
- Died: 28 August 2022 (aged 101) Nanjing, Jiangsu, China
- Party: Chinese Communist Party

Military service
- Allegiance: People's Republic of China
- Branch/service: People's Liberation Army Ground Force
- Years of service: 1939–1998
- Rank: Lieutenant general
- Battles/wars: Second Sino-Japanese War; Chinese Civil War; Korean War; Counter-attack of Zhenbao Island
- Awards: Order of Independence and Freedom (3rd Class); Order of Liberation (2nd Class)

Chinese name
- Chinese: 傅奎清
Transcriptions
Standard Mandarin
- Hanyu Pinyin: Fù Kuíqīng

Fu Yixian
- Simplified Chinese: 傅义先
- Traditional Chinese: 傅義先
Transcriptions
Standard Mandarin
- Hanyu Pinyin: Fù Yìxiān

Fu Kuiqing (Chinese: 傅奎清; 28 November 1920 – 28 August 2022) was a lieutenant general in the People's Liberation Army of China who served as political commissar of the Nanjing Military Region from 1985 to 1990. He was a delegate to the 5th National People's Congress and was a member of the Standing Committee of the 7th National People's Congress. He was a representative of the 10th, 12th, and 13th National Congress of the Chinese Communist Party. He was a member of the 12th Central Committee of the Chinese Communist Party.

== Biography ==
Fu was born Fu Yixian into a poor family in the town of Jinjiapu in Yingshan County, Hubei, on 28 November 1930. He joined the Chinese Communist Party (CCP) in August 1938 and enlisted in the New Fourth Army one year later. During the Second Sino-Japanese War, he served in the New Fourth Army and fought with the Imperial Japanese Army in east China's Anhui province. In 1949, he was assigned to the 3rd Field Army of the People's Liberation Army, and engaged in the Menglianggu campaign, Battle of Laiyang, Huaihai campaign, and the Yangtze River Crossing campaign.

After founding of the Communist State in 1949, he served in the 25th Army for a long time. He participated in the Korean War in April 1953 and returned to China in 1958. He was made director of the Political Department of the 23rd Army in January 1964. In February 1966, he became deputy political commissar, rising to political commissar in February 1969. He was appointed vice governor and party secretary of Heilongjiang in August 1971, concurrently serving as deputy political commissar of the Shenyang Military Region since October 1975. During his tenure, he participated in the Counter-attack of Zhenbao Island. He also served as director of the Political Department from December 1977 to December 1980. In December 1980, he was commissioned as political commissar and party secretary of the Fuzhou Military District, he remained in those positions until June 1985. After the Fuzhou Military District was merged into the Nanjing Military Region in 1985, he was appointed political commissar and deputy party secretary of the military region. He retired in July 1998.

He attained the rank of lieutenant general (zhongjiang) in September 1988.

On 28 August 2022, he died from an illness in Nanjing, Jiangsu, at the age of 102.

Military offices
Preceded by Guo Linxiang	Political Commissar of the Nanjing Military Region; 1985–1990	Succeeded by Shi Yuxiao
