= Autumn Harvest Uprising =

1927 Chinese revolt led by Mao Zedong

- Part of Chinese Civil War
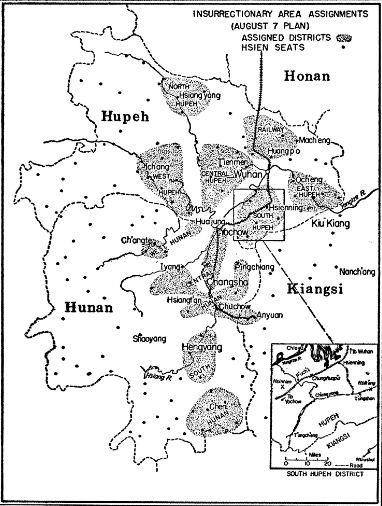
- Planned insurrection locations by the August Seventh Conference.
Date	September 7, 1927 to 1928
Location	Hunan, Jiangxi and Hubei.
Result	Uprising crushed, Communists forced to retreat to the Jinggang Mountains

Belligerents
Nationalist government: Kuomintang; National Revolutionary Army	Soviet Zone: Communist Party; Chinese Red Army

Commanders and leaders
Chiang Kai-shek; He Jian	Mao Zedong; Li Zhen

Casualties and losses
- About 390,000 Hunanese civilians were killed

Autumn Harvest Uprising
- Simplified Chinese: 秋收起义
- Traditional Chinese: 秋收起義
Transcriptions
Standard Mandarin
- Hanyu Pinyin: Qīushōu Qǐyì
- Wade–Giles: Ch’iu1-shou1 Chi3-yi4

The Autumn Harvest Uprising was an insurrection that took place in Hunan and Jiangxi provinces of China, on September 7, 1927, led by Mao Zedong, who established a short-lived Hunan Soviet.

After initial success, the uprising was brutally put down by Kuomintang forces. Mao continued to believe in the rural strategy but concluded that it would be necessary to form a party army.

== Background ==
Following Chiang Kai-shek gaining control of the Kuomintang (KMT) in April 1927, he ordered the extermination of all the communists and socialists within Shanghai. Commonly called the White Terror, this led to a massacre in Hunan in May, followed by a warrant for the arrest of Mao Zedong in 1927. The situation prompted local and scattered peasant resistance against landlords. Breaking relations between the KMT and Chinese Communist Party, an attempt to take Nanking was made by Zhou Enlai. Mao was therefore labelled a "red bandit", which led to him urging revolutionary support.

In support of the Northern Expedition, Mao was sent to survey peasant conditions in his home province of Hunan. His Report on an Investigation of the Peasant Movement in Hunan urged support for rural revolution.

== The uprising ==
Initially, Mao struggled to garner forces for an uprising, but Li Zhen rallied the peasantry and members of her local communist troop to join. Mao then led a small peasant army against the Kuomintang and the landlords of Hunan, successfully establishing a Soviet government. The uprising was eventually defeated by Kuomintang forces within two months after the Soviet was established. Mao and the others were forced to retreat to the Jinggang Mountains on the border between Hunan and Jiangxi provinces, where he encountered an army of miners which would help him in later battles.

== Legacy ==
Mao Zedong suffered from depression following his defeat in Hunan, prompting him to produce a poem about Yellow Crane Tower on Tortoise Hill.

The Autumn Harvest Uprising was one of the early armed uprisings by the Communists, marking a significant change in their strategy. Mao and Red Army founder Zhu De went on to develop a rural-based strategy that centered on guerrilla tactics. This paved the way for the Long March of 1934.

== Reasons for the uprising's failure ==
The uprising shows the overwhelming importance of an organized military force to the success or failure of an insurrection, the failure reveals that the role and question of military force was given different emphasis by operatives of different levels in the communist party and came to be a topic of serious contention and disagreement which led to the disorganization. An obvious lack of appreciation for rudimentary pre-insurrectionary military organization hints that Mao was more "putschist" (to a point) than his Chinese or Russian superiors.

=== Mass killings against Hunanese civilians ===
Nationalist anti-communist mass killings were directed against all Hunanese civilians. About 80,000 Hunanese were killed in Hunan's Liling and about 300,000 Hunanese were killed in Hunan's Chaling County, Leiyang, Liuyang and Pingjiang.

== See also ==
- Outline of the Chinese Civil War
- Chinese famine of 1928–30
