= Wang Meng =

Wang Meng may refer to:

- Wang Meng (Former Qin) (325–375), minister of Former Qin
- Wang Meng (painter) (1308–1385), Yuan dynasty artist
  - Wang Meng (crater), crater on Mercury, named after the painter
- Wang Meng (author) (born 1934), Chinese writer and former Minister of Culture

== Sportspeople ==
- Wang Meng (speed skater) (born 1985), Chinese speed skater
- Wang Meng (curler) (born 1988), Chinese wheelchair curler
- Wang Meng (cricketer) (born 1988), Chinese cricketer
- Wang Meng (footballer) (born 1993), Chinese association footballer
