= Qu Min =

Former Chinese politician

- 曲敏

Vice Chairman of the Heilongjiang Provincial Committee of the Chinese People's Political Consultative Conference
- In office February 2021 – June 2023
- Chairman: Huang Jiansheng; Lan Shaomin

Personal details
- Born: June 1963 (age 63) Shangzhi, Heilongjiang, China
- Party: Chinese Communist Party (1992–2023; expelled)
- Education: Jiamusi Agricultural School; Heilongjiang University; Harbin Institute of Technology

Qu Min (Chinese: 曲敏; pinyin: Qū Mǐn; born June 1963) is a former Chinese politician who spent his entire career in his home-province Heilongjiang. As of June 2023 he was under investigation by China's top anti-corruption agency. Previously he served as vice chairman of the Heilongjiang Provincial Committee of the Chinese People's Political Consultative Conference.

He was a representative of the 19th National Congress of the Chinese Communist Party.

== Early life and education ==
Qu was born in Shangzhi, Heilongjiang, in June 1963. In 1983, he enrolled at Jiamusi Agricultural School (佳木斯农业学校), where he majored in gardening.

== Career ==
After graduating in 1986, he was despatched as a technician of the Research Institute of Harbin Academy of Agricultural Science, and eventually becoming president in February 2003. He joined the Chinese Communist Party (CCP) in November 1992. He served as deputy secretary and governor of Hulan District in December 2006, and two years later promoted to the secretary position.

He became mayor of Beitun, a county-level city under the jurisdiction of Altay Prefecture, in June 2012, and then party secretary, the top political position in the city, beginning in July 2013.

In August 2015, he was made deputy party branch secretary of Heilongjiang Province Supply and Marketing Cooperative Union.

In February 2016, he was named acting mayor of Suihua, confirmed the next month. He was appointed party secretary in December 2016, concurrently serving as chairman of the Municipal People's Congress.

In February 2021, he was chosen as vice chairman of the Heilongjiang Provincial Committee of the Chinese People's Political Consultative Conference, the provincial advisory body.

== Downfall ==
On 14 June 2023, he had been suspended for "suspected serious discipline violations" by the Central Commission for Discipline Inspection (CCDI), the party's internal disciplinary body, and the National Supervisory Commission, the highest anti-corruption agency of China. On December 7, he was expelled from the CCP and removed from public office. On December 26, he was arrested on suspicion of taking bribes as per a decision made by the Supreme People's Procuratorate.

On 15 May 2024, Qu was indicted on suspicion of accepting bribes. On August 21, he stood trial at the Intermediate People's Court of Wenzhou on charges of taking bribes, the public prosecutors accused him of abusing his multiple positions between 2001 and 2022 in Heilongjiang to seek favor on behalf of certain organizations and individuals in enterprise operation, engineering contracting, and job adjustment, in return, he received bribes worth more than 68.43 million yuan ($9.55 million) either himself or via his family members. On November 6, he was sentenced to 13 years and fined 3 million yuan for taking bribes, all his illegal gains will be confiscated and handed over to the state.

Government offices
Preceded by Wang Jinhui	Mayor of Suihua; 2016	Succeeded by Zhang Zilin
Party political offices
Preceded by Zhang Jingchuan	Communist Party Secretary of Suihua; 2016–2021	Succeeded by Sun Hengyi
