= Han Guang (politician) =

Chinese politician

Han Guang (Chinese: 韩光) (March 1912 – September 27, 2008) was a Chinese politician. He was born in Qiqihar, Heilongjiang Province. He was governor of his home province.

Preceded by Chen Lei	Governor of Heilongjiang	Succeeded by Ouyang Qin
