= Hou Jie =

Chinese politician

Hou Jie (Chinese: 侯捷) (1931–2000) was a Chinese politician. He was born in Luan County, Hebei Province. He was governor of Heilongjiang Province.

Preceded by Chen Lei	Governor of Heilongjiang	Succeeded by Shao Qihui
