= Heilongjiang Provincial Committee of the Chinese Communist Party =

Heilongjiang Provincial Committee of the Chinese Communist Party 中国共产党黑龙江省委员会

Overview
- Type: Highest decision-making organ when Heilongjiang Provincial Congress is not in session.
- Elected by: Heilongjiang Provincial Congress
- Length of term: Five years
- Term limits: None
- First convocation: August 15, 1946; 79 years ago

Leadership
- Secretary: Xu Qin
- Executive organ: Standing Committee
- Inspection organ: Commission for Discipline Inspection

Heilongjiang Provincial Committee of the Chinese Communist Party
- Simplified Chinese: 中国共产党黑龙江省委员会
- Traditional Chinese: 中國共產黨黑龍江省委員會
Transcriptions
Standard Mandarin
- Hanyu Pinyin: Zhōngguó Gòngchǎndǎng Hēilóngjiāngshěng Wěiyuánhuì

Abbreviation
- Simplified Chinese: 中共黑龙江省委
- Traditional Chinese: 中共黑龍江省委
- Literal meaning: CCP Heilongjiang Provincial Committee
Transcriptions
Standard Mandarin
- Hanyu Pinyin: Zhōnggòng Hēilóngjiāngshěng Wěi

The Heilongjiang Provincial Committee of the Chinese Communist Party is the provincial committee of the Chinese Communist Party (CCP) in Heilongjiang and the province's top authority. The CCP committee secretary is the highest ranking post in the province.

== Organizations ==
The organization of the Heilongjiang Provincial Committee includes:

- General Office

=== Functional Departments ===
- Organization Department
- Publicity Department
- United Front Work Department
- Political and Legal Affairs Commission
- Social Work Department
- Commission for Discipline Inspection
- Supervisory Commission

=== Offices ===
- Policy Research Office
- Office of the Cyberspace Affairs Commission
- Office of the Foreign Affairs Commission
- Office of the Deepening Reform Commission
- Office of the Institutional Organization Commission
- Office of the Military-civilian Fusion Development Committee
- Taiwan Work Office
- Office of the Leading Group for Inspection Work
- Bureau of Veteran Cadres

=== Dispatched institutions ===
- Working Committee of the Organs Directly Affiliated to the Heilongjiang Provincial Committee

=== Organizations directly under the Committee ===
- Heilongjiang Party School
- Heilongjiang Daily Newspaper Group
- Heilongjiang Institute of Socialism
- Party History Research Office
- Heilongjiang Provincial Archives
- Lecturer Group

=== Organization managed by the work organization ===
- Confidential Bureau

== Leadership ==
=== Heads of the Organization Department ===
Name (English)	Name (Chinese)	Term start	Term end	Ref.
Yang Bo	杨博	May 2022		

=== Heads of the Publicity Department ===
Name (English)	Name (Chinese)	Term start	Term end	Ref.
He Liangjun	何良军	May 2022		

=== Secretaries of the Political and Legal Affairs Commission ===
Name (English)	Name (Chinese)	Term start	Term end	Ref.
Liu Hui	刘惠	December 2022		

=== Heads of the United Front Work Department ===
Name (English)	Name (Chinese)	Term start	Term end	Ref.
Xu Jianguo	徐建国	May 2022		

== See also ==
- Politics of Heilongjiang
