= Zhao Dezun =

Chinese politician

Zhao Dezun (1913 – February 1, 2012) was a Chinese politician. He was born in Liaozhong County, Fengtian Province (now part of Shenyang, Liaoning Province). He was Chinese Communist Party Committee Secretary and Governor of Heilongjiang Province.

Preceded by Zhang Qilong	Communist Party Chief of Heilongjiang	Succeeded by Feng Jixin
