= Ouyang Qin =

Chinese politician

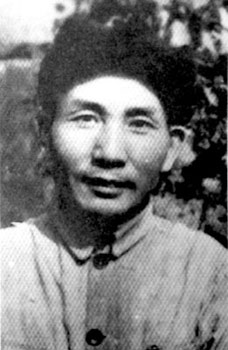
Ouyang Qin

Ouyang Qin (Chinese: 欧阳钦; 1900 – May 15, 1978), original name Yang Qing (Chinese: 杨清), was a People's Republic of China politician. He was born in Ningxiang County, Hunan Province and educated in Changsha. His parents died when he was young. In 1926, he participated in the Northern Expedition. After the creation of the People's Republic of China, he served as Chinese Communist Party Committee Secretary and Governor of Heilongjiang Province.
