= Fujian =

Province in South China

Fujian 福建 Fukien, Hokkien, Fuchien
- Province

Name transcription(s)
  - Chinese: 福建省 (Fújiàn Shěng)
  - Abbreviation: FJ / 闽 (pinyin: Mǐn; Pe̍h-ōe-jī: Bân)
  - Foochow: Hók-gióng
  - Hokkien POJ: Hok-kiàn
  - Hokkien Tâi-lô: Hok-kiàn
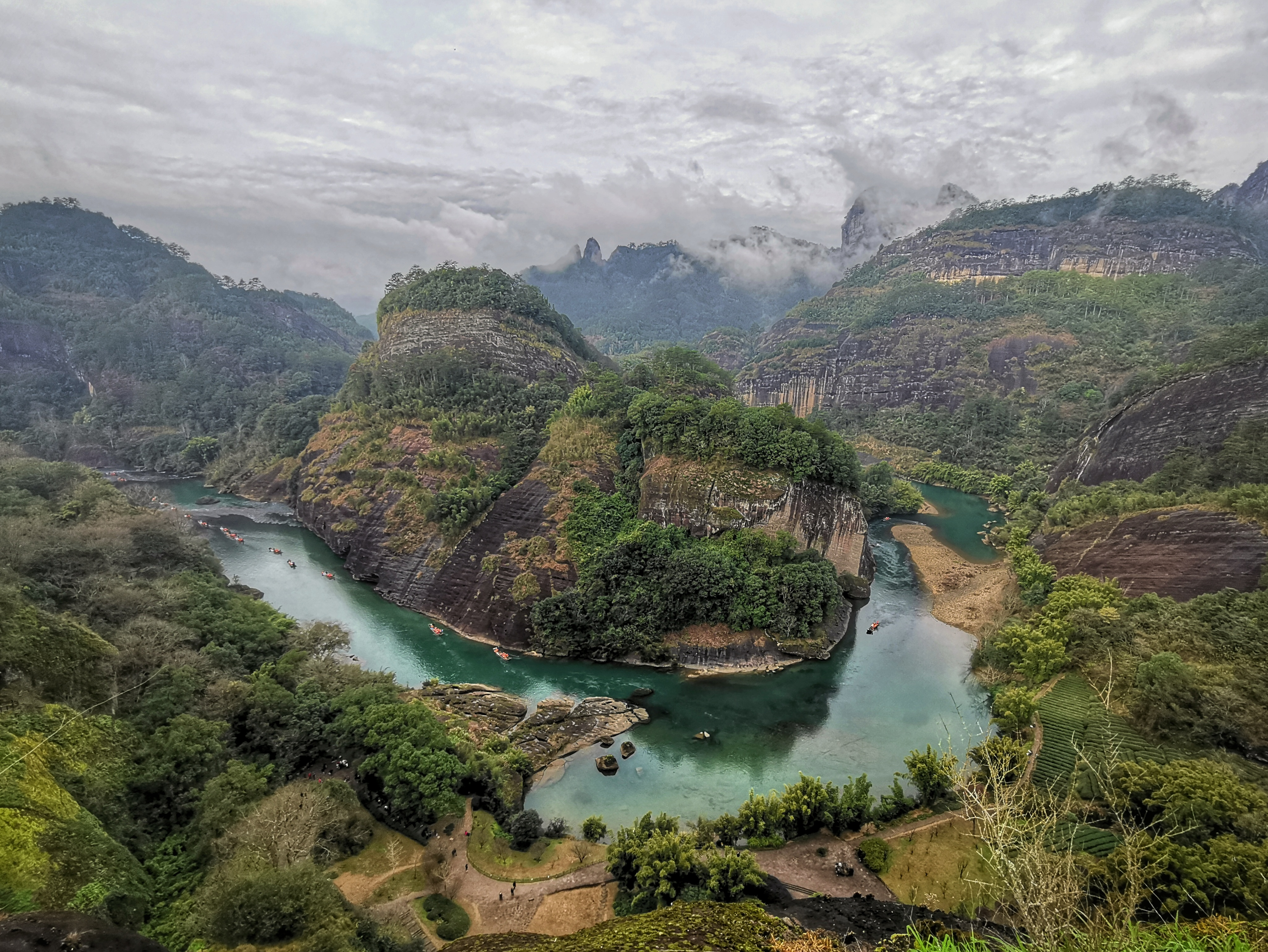
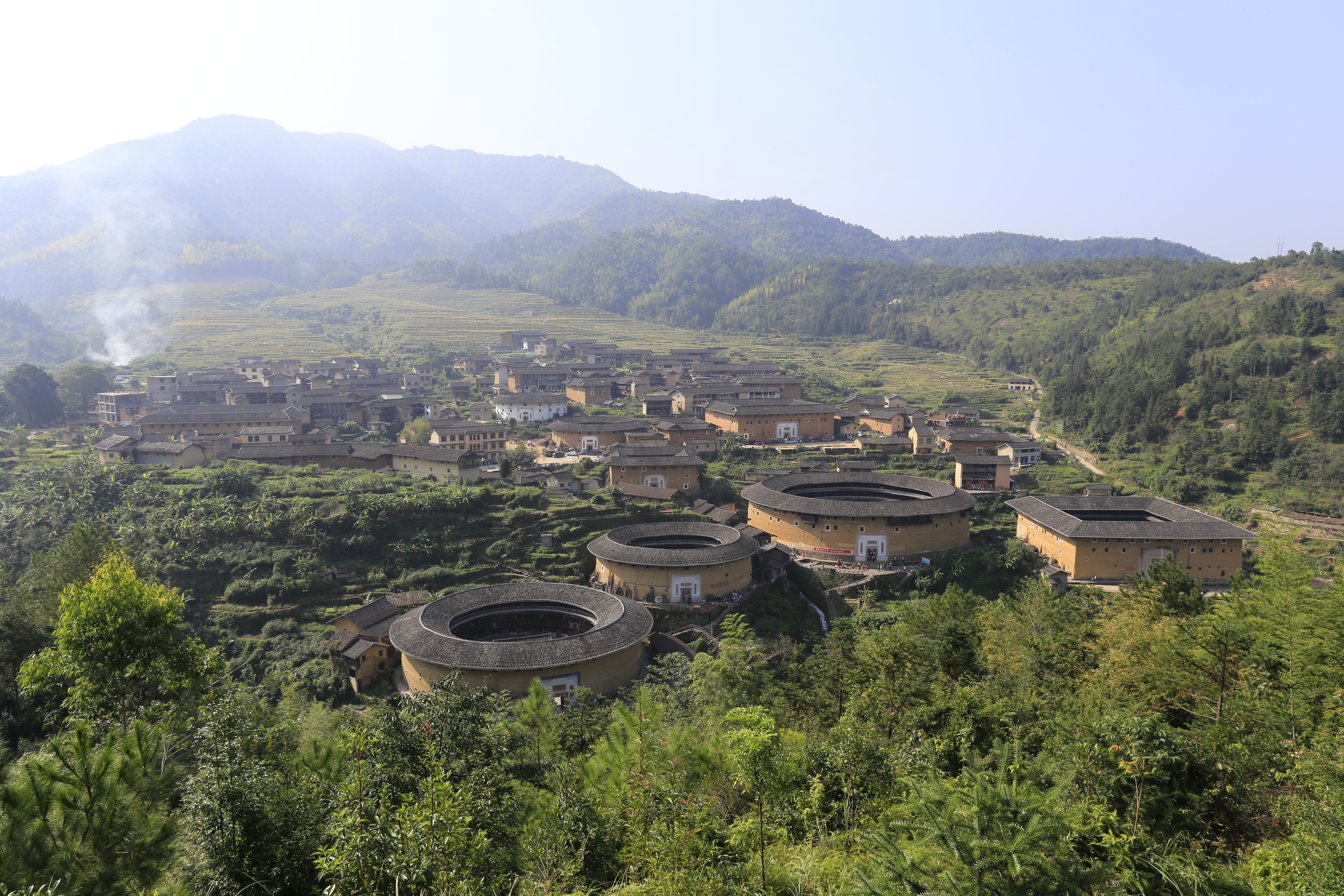
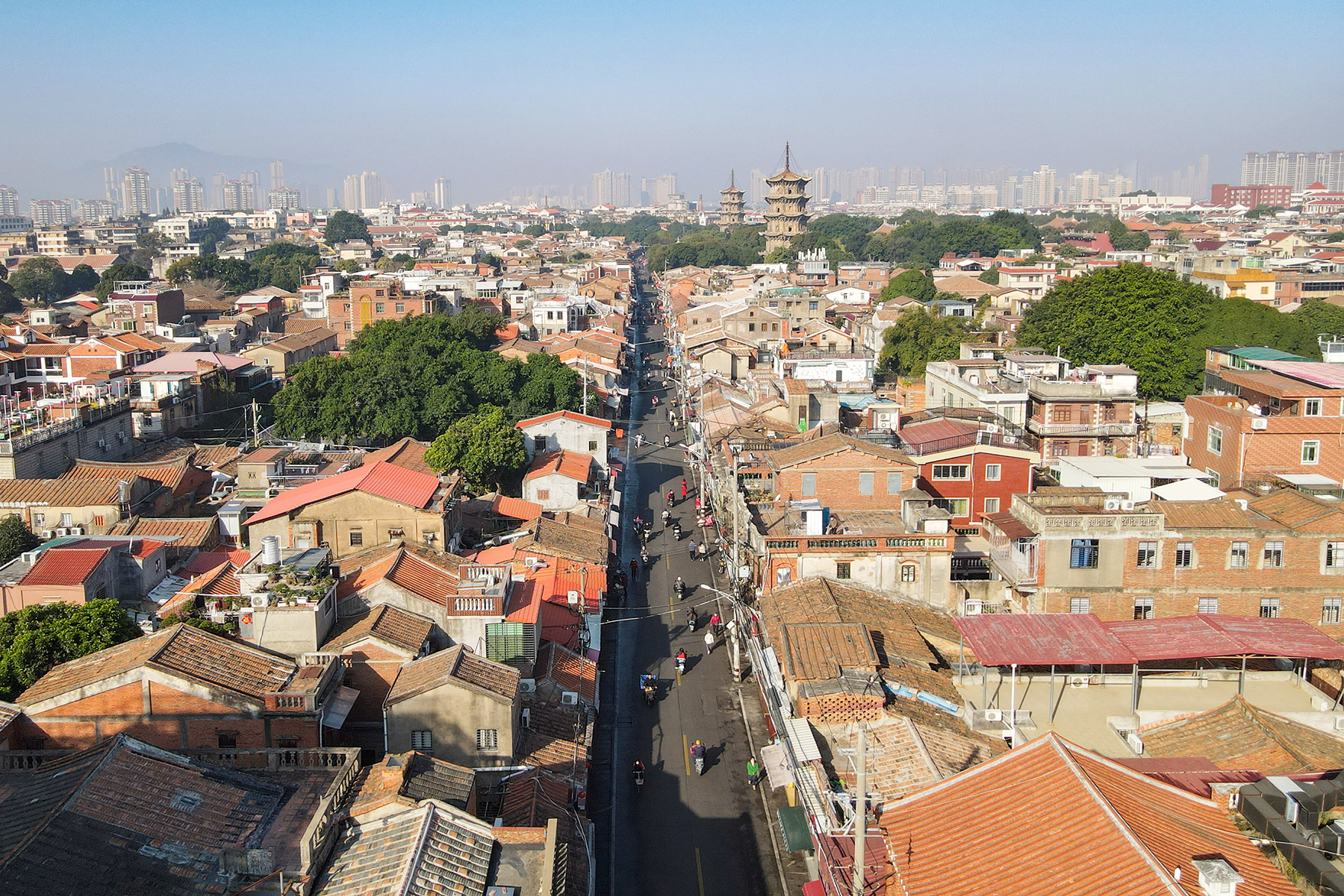
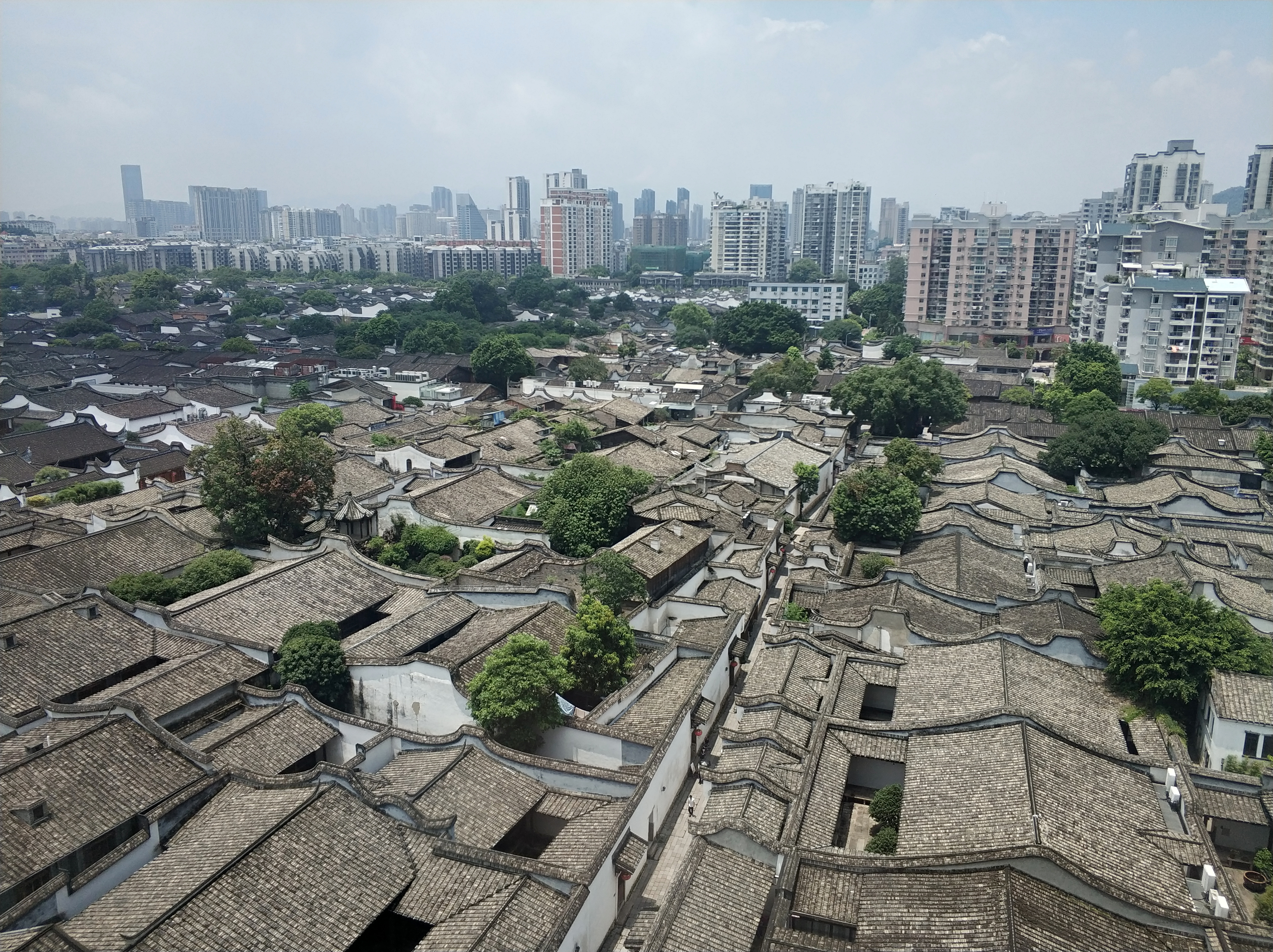
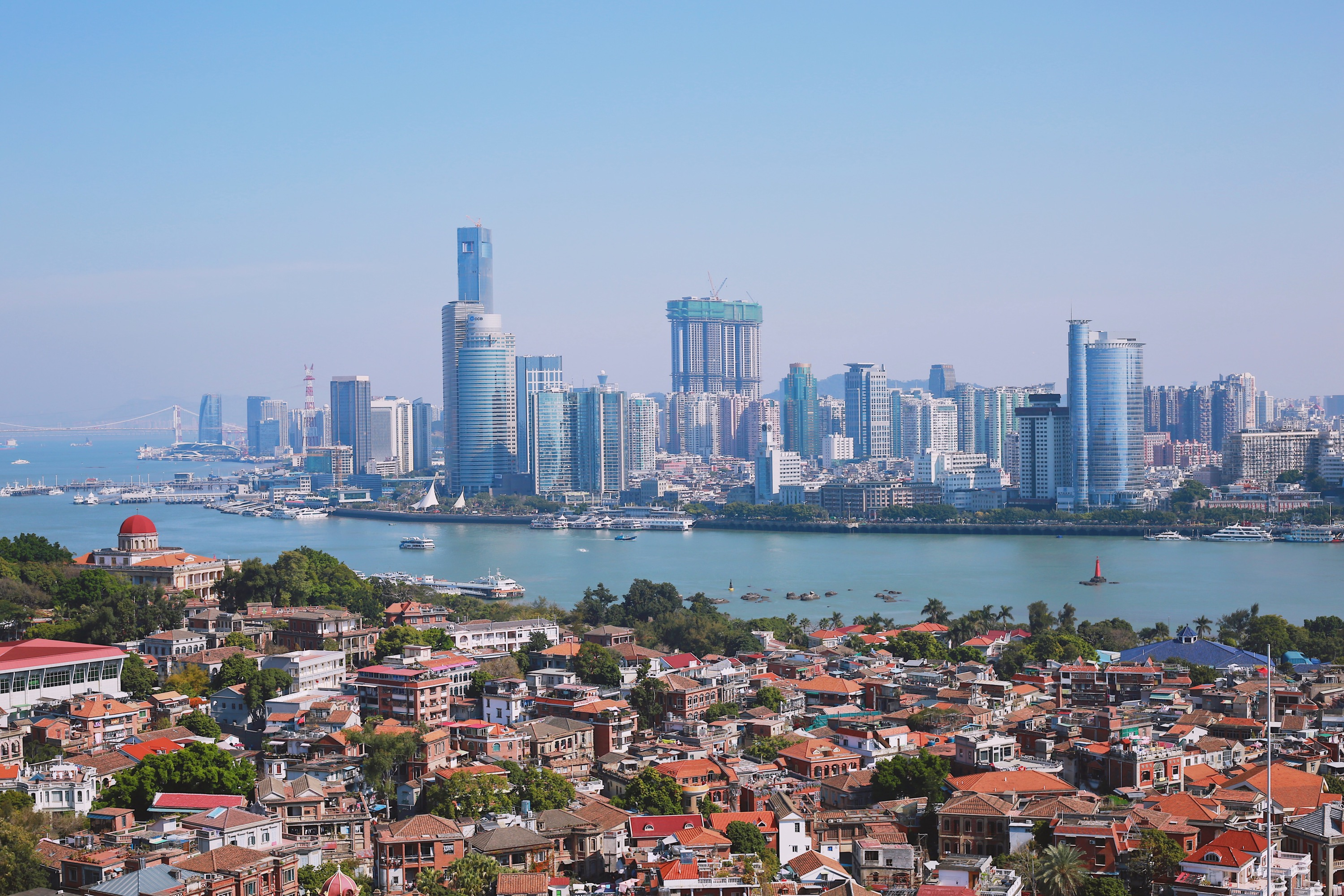
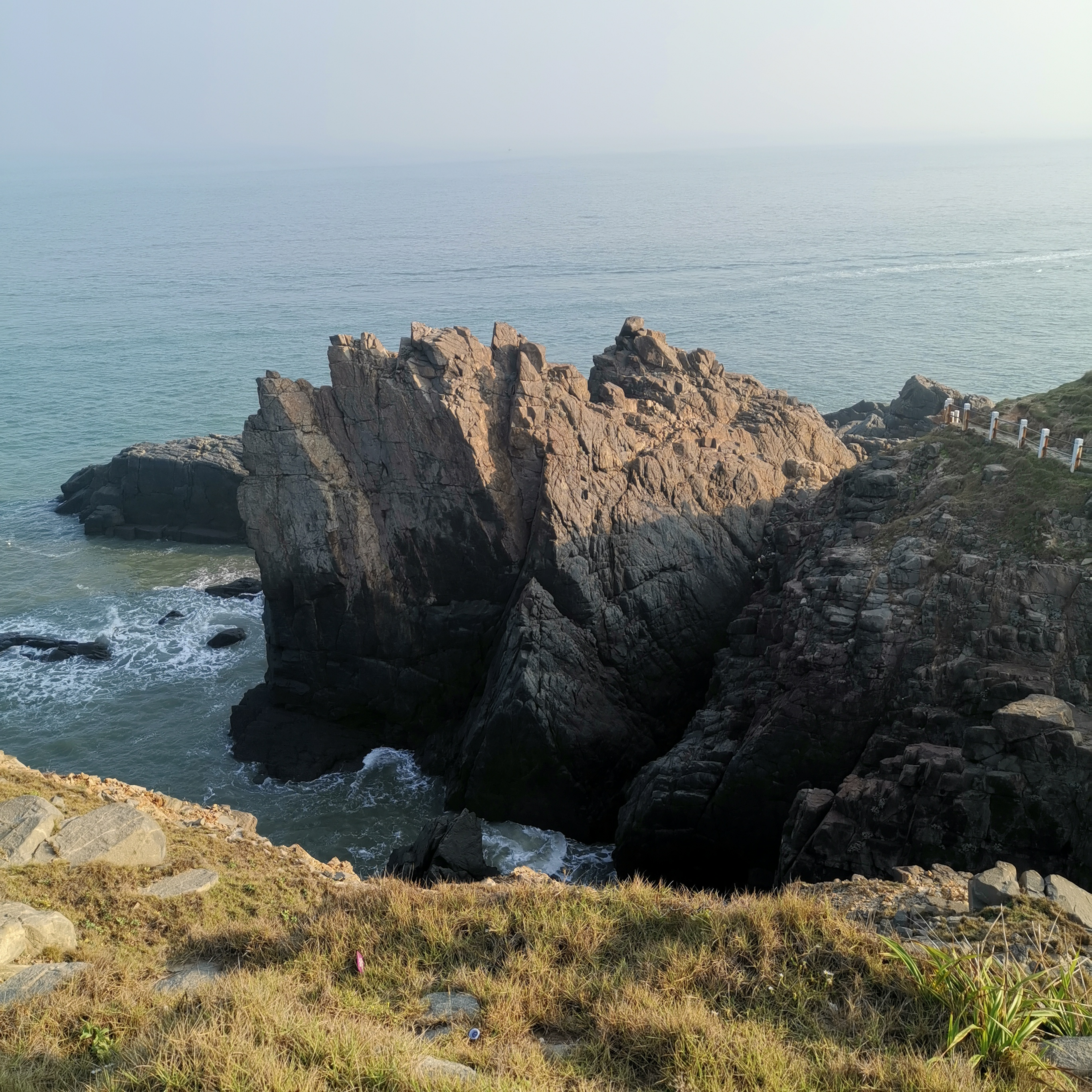
- Wuyi Mountains Meizhou Tianhou Palace Chuxi Tulou cluster Xiapu Mudflat Old City of Quanzhou Sanfang Qixiang Danxia landform in Taining Gulangyu Dongshan Island Pingtan Island

- Location of Fujian in China
- Coordinates: 25°54′N 118°18′E
- Country: China
- Jiangnandong Circuit: 626
- Fujian Circuit: 985
- Partition of Taiwan: 1887
- Within the Republic of China: 1 January 1912
- Fujian People's Government: 1933–1934
- Division of Fujian: 17 August 1949
- Named for: 福 Fú: Fuzhou 建 Jiàn: Jianzhou
- Capital: Fuzhou
- Largest city: Quanzhou
- Divisions: Prefecture-level; County-level; Township-; level: 9 prefectures 84 counties (Note: These are the official PRC numbers as of 2022 from Fujian Provincial Statistic Bureau. Quemoy is included as a county and Matsu as a township.); 1102 towns and subdistricts

Government
  - Type: Province
  - Body: Fujian Provincial People's Congress
  - Party Secretary: Zhao Long
  - Congress Chairman: Zhao Long
  - Governor: Guo Ningning (Acting)
  - Provincial CPPCC Chairman: Teng Jiacai
  - National People's Congress Representation: 74 deputies

Area (Note: If included the islands of Kinmen, Matsu and Wuqiu, claimed by the PRC but administered by the Republic of China (ROC) as part of its province of Fuchien, the total area overall is 121,580 square kilometres (46,940 sq mi) in Fujian.)
  - Total: 121,400 km^{2} (46,900 sq mi)
  - Rank: 23rd
- Highest elevation (Mt. Huanggang): 2,158 m (7,080 ft)

Population (2020)
  - Total: 41,540,086
  - Rank: 15th
  - Density: 342.2/km^{2} (886.2/sq mi)
  - Rank: 14th

Demographics
  - Ethnic composition: Han – 98%; She – 1%; Hui – 0.3%
  - Languages and dialects: Min (inc. Fuzhounese of Eastern Min, Northern Min, Central Min, Pu-Xian Min, Hokkien of Southern Min and others), Standard Chinese, Wu, Gan, She, Hakka

GDP (2025)
  - Total: CN¥6.02 trillion (8th; US$864 billion)
  - Per capita: CN¥144,920 (4th; US$20,804)
- ISO 3166 code: CN-FJ
- HDI (2023): 0.812 (7th) – very high
- Website: www.fujian.gov.cn (in Chinese)

Fujian
- "Fujian" in Chinese characters
- Chinese: 福建
- Postal: Fukien
- Literal meaning: Happy establishment ("Fu(zhou) and Jian(zhou)")
Transcriptions
Standard Mandarin
- Hanyu Pinyin: Fújiàn
- Bopomofo: ㄈㄨˊ ㄐㄧㄢˋ
- Gwoyeu Romatzyh: Fwujiann
- Wade–Giles: Fu^{2}-chien^{4}
- Tongyong Pinyin: Fújiàn
- Yale Romanization: Fújyàn
- MPS2: Fújiàn
- IPA: [fǔ.tɕjɛ̂n]
Wu
- Romanization: Foh-ji
Hakka
- Romanization: Fuk-kian
Yue: Cantonese
- Yale Romanization: Fūk-gin
- Jyutping: Fuk^{1}-gin^{3}
- IPA: [fʊk̚˥.kin˧]
Southern Min
- Hokkien POJ: Hok-kiàn
- Tâi-lô: Hok-kiàn
- Bbánlám Pìngyīm: Hōkgiàn
Eastern Min
- Fuzhou BUC: Hók-gióng
Pu-Xian Min
- Hinghwa BUC: Ho̤h-ge̤̍ng
Northern Min
- Jian'ou Romanized: Hŭ-gṳ̿ing

Abbreviation
- Simplified Chinese: 闽
- Traditional Chinese: 閩
- Literal meaning: [the Min River]
Transcriptions
Standard Mandarin
- Hanyu Pinyin: Mǐn
- Bopomofo: ㄇㄧㄣˇ
- Gwoyeu Romatzyh: Miin
- Wade–Giles: Min^{3}
- Tongyong Pinyin: Mǐn
- IPA: [mìn]
Yue: Cantonese
- Yale Romanization: Máhn
- Jyutping: Man^{5}
- IPA: [mɐn˩˧]
Southern Min
- Tâi-lô: Bân
Eastern Min
- Fuzhou BUC: Mìng
Pu-Xian Min
- Hinghwa BUC: Máng
Northern Min
- Jian'ou Romanized: Mâing

Fujian (Note: /ˌfuːdʒiˈɛn/ 福建; previously romanized as Fuchien, Fukien or Hokkien) is a province in southeast China. Fujian is bordered by Zhejiang to the north, Jiangxi to the west, Guangdong to the south, and the Taiwan Strait to the east. Its capital is Fuzhou and its largest prefecture city by population is Quanzhou, with other notable cities including the port city of Xiamen and Zhangzhou. Fujian is located on the west coast of the Taiwan Strait as the closest province geographically and culturally to Taiwan. Additionally, a small portion of historical Fujian is administered by the government of the Republic of China (Taiwan), romanized as Fuchien, a result of the Chinese Civil War.

While the population predominantly identifies as Han, it is one of China's most culturally and linguistically diverse provinces. The dialects of the language group Min Chinese are most commonly spoken within the province, including the Fuzhou dialect and other Eastern Min languages of Northeastern Fujian and Hokkien dialect and other Southern Min languages of southeastern Fujian. The capital city of Fuzhou and Fu'an of Ningde prefecture along with Cangnan county-level city of Wenzhou prefecture in Zhejiang province make up the Min Dong linguistic and cultural region of Northeastern Fujian. Hakka Chinese is also spoken in Fujian, by the Hakka people. Min dialects, Hakka, and Standard Chinese are mutually unintelligible. Due to emigration, much of the ethnic Chinese populations of Taiwan, Singapore, Malaysia, Indonesia, and the Philippines speak Southern Min (or Hokkien).

With a population of 41.5 million, Fujian ranks 15th in population among Chinese provinces. In 2022, its GDP reached CN¥5.31 trillion (US$790 billion by nominal GDP), ranking 4th in East China region and 8th nationwide in GDP. Fujian's GDP per capita is above the national average, at CN¥126,829 (US$18,856 in nominal), the second highest GDP per capita of all Chinese provinces after Jiangsu.

Fujian is considered one of China's leading provinces in education and research. As of 2023, two major cities in the province ranked in the top 45 cities in the world (Xiamen 38th and Fuzhou 45th) by scientific research output, as tracked by the Nature Index.

== Name ==
The name Fujian (福建) originated from the combination of the city names of Fuzhou (福州) and nearby Jianzhou (建州, or present-day Nanping (南平)). The province's name of Fujian means "happy establishment".

One of the Chinese characters in the province fu (福; fú), meaning 'fortune' or 'good luck', is represented both as a Chinese ideograph and, at times, pictorially, in one of its homophonous forms. It is often found on a figurine of the male god of the same name, one of the trio of "star gods" Fú, Lù, and Shòu. The second character, jian (建; jiàn) is translated as 'establish' and 'to establish'.

Fujian is historically rendered in postal romanization and Wade-Giles as Fukien or Fuchien for much of the 20th century. The name of this province adopted its current pinyin name of "Fujian" in 1958 by the PRC authorities; after the United States government normalized relations with the PRC in 1979, the International Organization for Standardization adopted pinyin in 1982, followed by the United Nations in 1986 with several Western media outlets (such as the Associated Press) adopted pinyin as the years went by. The Government of the Republic of China on Taiwan (who adopted pinyin in 2009) continues to use the older transliterations of Fujian for its own province.

== History ==
=== Prehistoric Fujian ===
Recent archaeological discoveries in 2011 demonstrate that Fujian had entered the Neolithic Age by the middle of the 6th millennium BC. From the Keqiutou site (7450–5590 BP), an early Neolithic site in Pingtan Island located about 70 kilometres (43 mi) southeast of Fuzhou, numerous tools made of stones, shells, bones, jades, and ceramics (including wheel-made ceramics) have been unearthed, together with spinning wheels, which is definitive evidence of weaving.

The Tanshishan (曇石山) site (5500–4000 BP) in suburban Fuzhou spans the Neolithic and Chalcolithic Age where semi-underground circular buildings were found in the lower level. The Huangtulun (黃土崙) site (c. 1325 BC), also in suburban Fuzhou, was of the Bronze Age in character.

Tianlong Jiao (2013) notes that the Neolithic appeared on the coast of Fujian around 6,000 B.P. During the Neolithic, the coast of Fujian had a low population density, with the population depending on mostly on fishing and hunting, along with limited agriculture.

There were four major Neolithic cultures in coastal Fujian, with the earliest Neolithic cultures originating from the north in coastal Zhejiang.

- Keqiutou culture (壳丘头文化; c. 6000 – c. 5500 BP, or c. 4050 – c. 3550 BC)
- Tanshishan culture (昙石山文化; c. 5000 – c. 4300 BP, or c. 3050 – c. 2350 BC)
- Damaoshan culture (大帽山文化; c. 5000 – c. 4300 BP)
- Huangguashan culture (黄瓜山文化; c. 4300 – c. 3500 BP, or c. 2350 – c. 1550 BC)

There were two major Neolithic cultures in inland Fujian, which were highly distinct from the coastal Fujian Neolithic cultures. These are the Niubishan culture (牛鼻山文化) from 5000 to 4000 years ago, and the Hulushan culture (葫芦山文化) from 2050 to 1550 BC.

=== Minyue kingdom ===
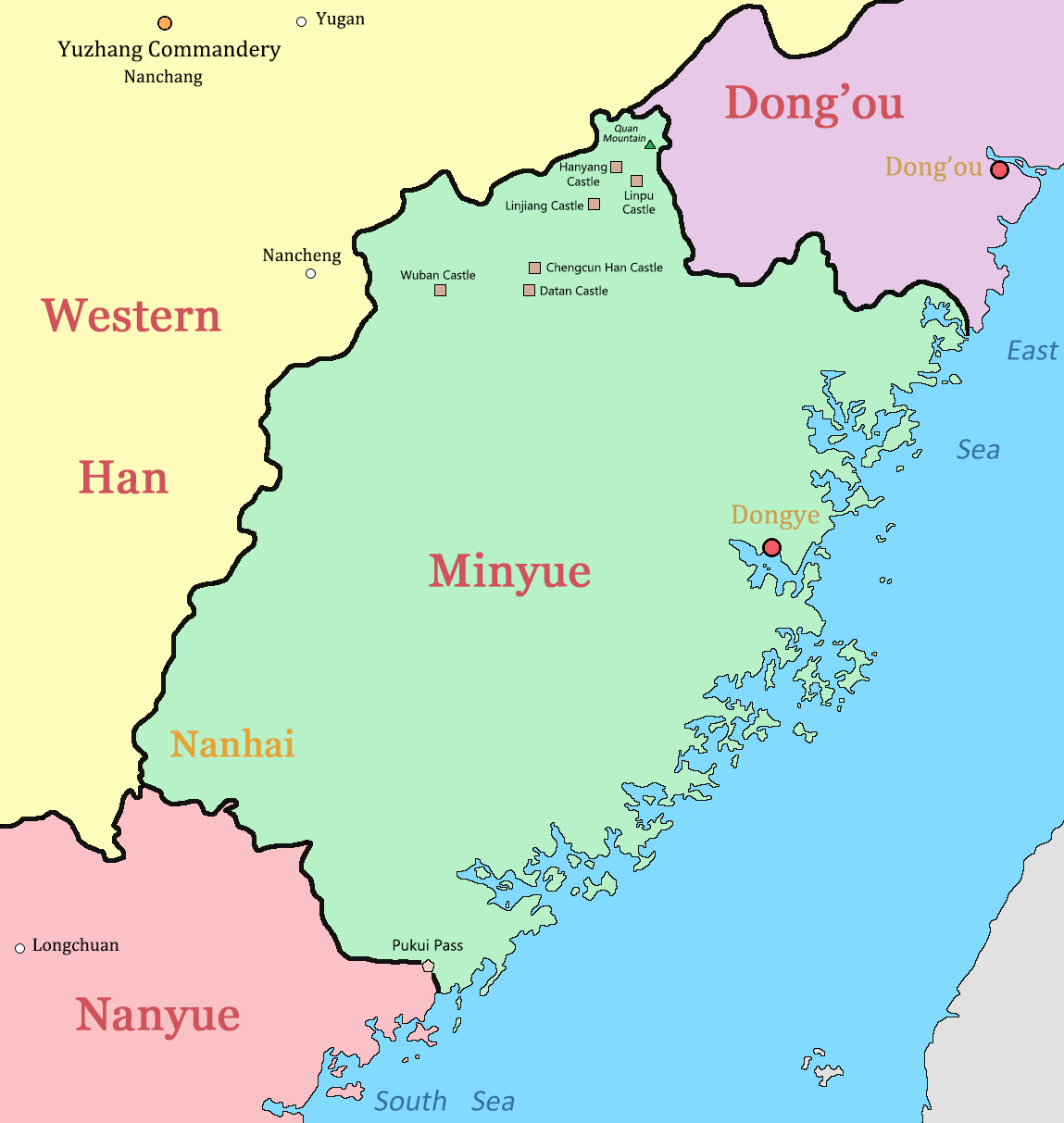
Map of Minyue

Fujian was also where the kingdom of Minyue was located. The word "Mǐnyuè" was derived by combining "Mǐn" (simplified Chinese: 闽; traditional Chinese: 閩; Pe̍h-ōe-jī: bân), which is perhaps an ethnic name (simplified Chinese: 蛮; traditional Chinese: 蠻; pinyin: mán; Pe̍h-ōe-jī: bân), and "Yuè", after the State of Yue, a Spring and Autumn period kingdom in Zhejiang to the north. This is because the royal family of Yuè fled to Fujian after its kingdom was annexed by the State of Chu in 306 BC. Mǐn is also the name of the main river in this area, but the ethnonym is probably older.

=== Qin dynasty ===
The Qin deposed the King of Minyue, establishing instead a paramilitary province there called Minzhong Commandery. Minyue was a de facto kingdom until one of the emperors of the Qin dynasty, the first unified imperial Chinese state, abolished its status.

=== Han dynasty ===
In the aftermath of the Qin dynasty's fall, civil war broke out between two warlords, Xiang Yu and Liu Bang. The Minyue king Wuzhu sent his troops to fight with Liu and his gamble paid off. Liu was victorious and founded the Han dynasty. In 202 BC, he restored Minyue's status as a tributary independent kingdom. Thus Wuzhu was allowed to construct his fortified city in Fuzhou as well as a few locations in the Wuyi Mountains, which have been excavated in recent years. His kingdom extended beyond the borders of contemporary Fujian into eastern Guangdong, eastern Jiangxi, and southern Zhejiang.

After Wuzhu's death, Minyue maintained its militant tradition and launched several expeditions against its neighboring kingdoms in Guangdong, Jiangxi, and Zhejiang, primarily in the 2nd century BC. This was stopped by the Han dynasty as it expanded southward. The Han emperor eventually decided to get rid of the potential threat by launching a military campaign against Minyue. Large forces approached Minyue simultaneously from four directions via land and sea in 111 BC. The rulers in Fuzhou surrendered to avoid a futile fight and destruction and the first kingdom in Fujian history came to an abrupt end.

Fujian was part of the much larger Yang Province (Yangzhou), whose provincial capital was designated in Liyang (歷陽; present-day He County, Anhui).

The Han dynasty collapsed at the end of the 2nd century AD, paving the way for the Three Kingdoms era. Sun Quan, the founder of the Kingdom of Wu, spent nearly 20 years subduing the Shan Yue people, the branch of the Yue living in mountains.

=== Jin era ===
The first wave of immigration of the noble class arrived in the province in the early 4th century when the Western Jin dynasty collapsed and the north was torn apart by civil wars and rebellions by tribal peoples from the north and west. These immigrants were primarily from eight families in central China: Chen (陈), Lin (林), Huang (黄), Zheng (郑), Zhan (詹), Qiu (邱), He (何), and Hu (胡). To this day, the first four remain the most popular surnames in Fujian.

Nevertheless, isolation from nearby areas owing to rugged terrain contributed to Fujian's relatively undeveloped economy and level of development, despite major population boosts from northern China during the "barbarian" rebellions. The population density in Fujian remained low compared to the rest of China. Only two commanderies and sixteen counties were established by the Western Jin dynasty. Like other southern provinces such as Guangdong, Guangxi, Guizhou, and Yunnan, Fujian often served as a destination for exiled prisoners and dissidents at that time.

During the Southern and Northern Dynasties era, the Southern Dynasties (Liu Song, Southern Qi, Liang (Western Liang), and Chen) reigned south of the Yangtze River, including Fujian.

=== Sui and Tang dynasties ===
During the Sui and Tang eras a large influx of migrants settled in Fujian.

During the Sui dynasty, Fujian was again part of Yang Province.

During the Tang, Fujian was part of the larger Jiangnan East Circuit, whose capital was at Suzhou. Modern-day Fujian was composed of around 5 prefectures and 25 counties.

The Tang dynasty (618–907) oversaw the next golden age of China, which contributed to a boom in Fujian's culture and economy. Fuzhou's economic and cultural institutions grew and developed. The later years of the Tang dynasty saw several political upheavals in the Chinese heartland, prompting even larger waves of northerners to immigrate to the northern part of Fujian.

=== Five Dynasties Ten Kingdoms ===
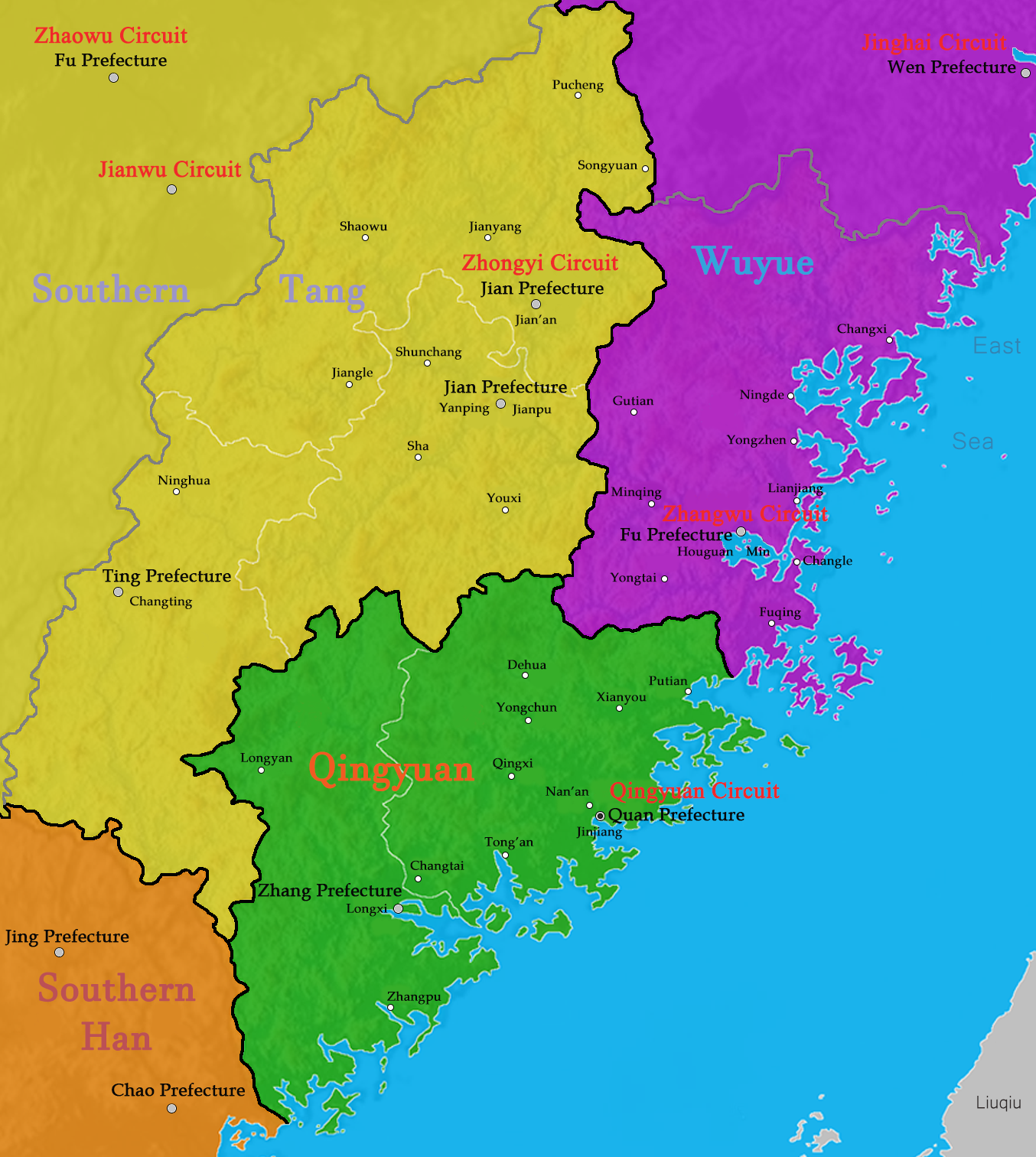
Situation of Fujian in 957

As the Tang dynasty ended, China was torn apart in the period of the Five Dynasties and Ten Kingdoms. During this time, a second major wave of immigration arrived in the safe haven of Fujian, led by Wang Brothers (Wang Chao, Wang Shengui and Wang Shenzhi), who set up an independent Kingdom of Min with its capital in Fuzhou. After the death of the founding king, however, the kingdom suffered from internal strife, and was soon absorbed by Southern Tang, another southern kingdom.

Parts of northern Fujian were conquered by the Wuyue Kingdom to the north as well, including the Min capital Fuzhou.

Quanzhou city was blooming into a seaport under the reign of the Min Kingdom.

Qingyuan Jiedushi was a military/governance office created in 949 by Southern Tang's second emperor Li Jing for the warlord Liu Congxiao, who nominally submitted to him but controlled Quan (泉州, in modern Quanzhou, Fujian) and Zhang (漳州, in modern Zhangzhou, Fujian) Prefectures in de facto independence from the Southern Tang state. (Zhang Prefecture was, at times during the circuit's existence, also known as Nan Prefecture (南州).) Starting in 960, in addition to being nominally submissive to Southern Tang, Qingyuan Circuit was also nominally submissive to Song, which had itself become Southern Tang's nominal overlord.

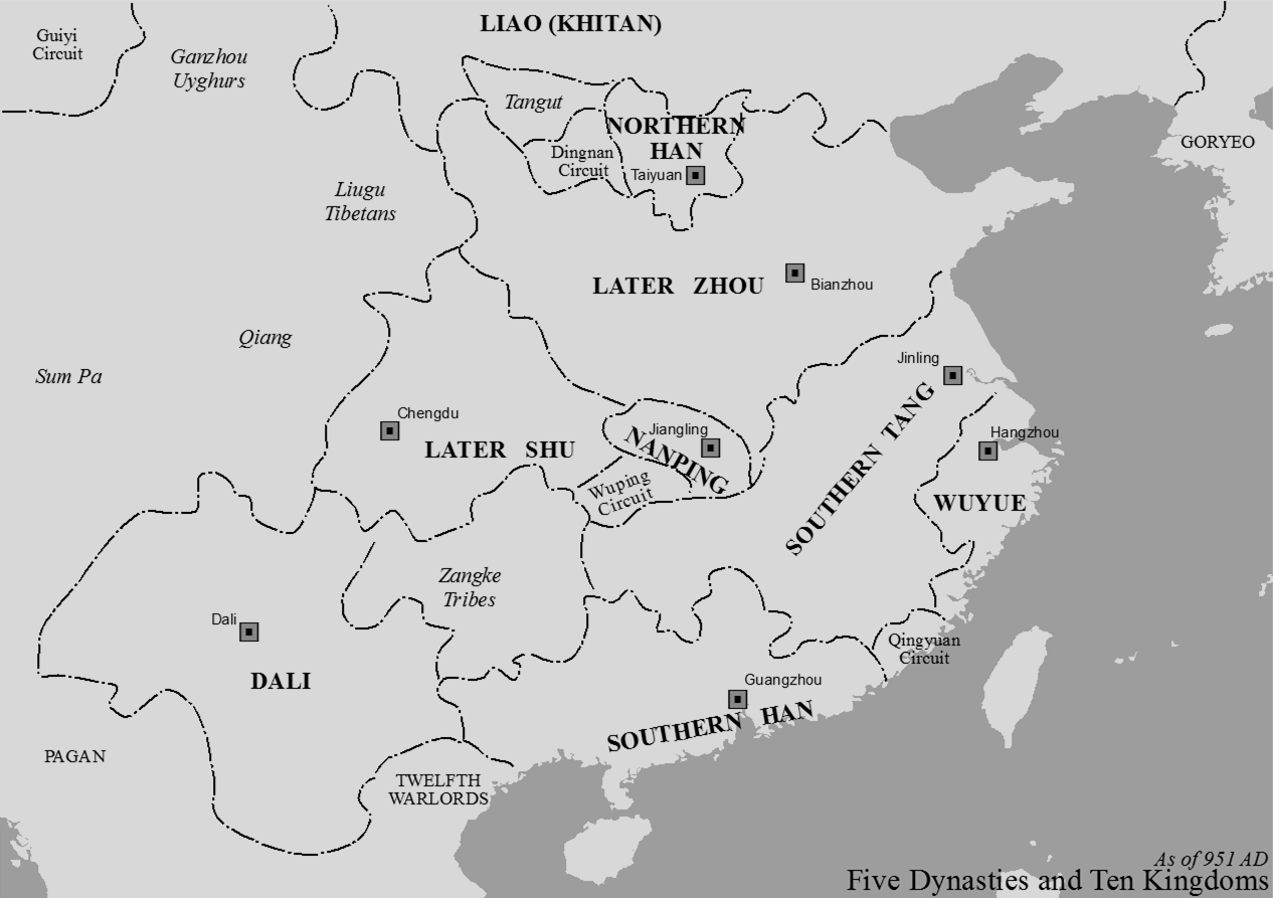
Map showing the location of Qingyuan Circuit

After Liu's death, the circuit was briefly ruled by his biological nephew/adoptive son Liu Shaozi, who was then overthrown by the officers Zhang Hansi and Chen Hongjin. Zhang then ruled the circuit briefly, before Chen deposed him and took over. In 978, with Song's determination to unify Chinese lands in full order, Chen decided that he could not stay de facto independent, and offered the control of the circuit to Song's Emperor Taizong, ending Qingyuan Circuit as a de facto independent entity.

=== Song dynasty ===
The area was reorganized into the Fujian Circuit in 985, which was the first time the name "Fujian" was used for an administrative region.

=== Vietnam ===
Many Chinese migrated from Fujian's major ports to Vietnam's Red River Delta. The settlers then created Trần port and Vân Đồn. Fujian and Guangdong Chinese moved to the Vân Đồn coastal port to engage in commerce.

During the Lý and Trần dynasties, many Chinese ethnic groups with the surname Trần (陳) migrated to Vietnam from what is now Fujian or Guangxi. They settled along the coast of Vietnam and the capital's southeastern area. The Vietnamese Trần clan traces their ancestry to Trần Tự Minh (227 BC). He was a Qin General during the Warring state period who belonged to the indigenous Mân, a Baiyue ethnic group of Southern China and Northern Vietnam. Tự Minh also served under King An Dương Vương of Âu Lạc kingdom in resisting Qin's conquest of Âu Lạc. Their genealogy also included Trần Tự Viễn (582 – 637) of Giao Châu and Trần Tự An (1010 – 1077) of Đại Việt. Near the end of the 11th century the descendants of a fisherman named Trần Kinh, whose hometown was in Tức Mạc village in Đại Việt (Modern day Vietnam), would marry the royal Lý clan, which was then founded the Vietnam Tran dynasty in 1225.

In Vietnam, the Trần served as officials. The surnames are found in the Trần and Lý dynasty Imperial exam records. Chinese ethnic groups are recorded in Trần and Lý dynasty records of officials. Clothing, food, and languages were fused with the local Vietnamese in Vân Đồn district where the Chinese ethnic groups had moved after leaving their home province of what is now Fujian, Guangxi, and Guangdong.

In 1172, Fujian was attacked by Pi-she-ye pirates from Taiwan or the Visayas, Philippines.

=== Yuan dynasty ===
After the establishment of the Yuan dynasty, Fujian became part of Jiangzhe province, whose capital was at Hangzhou. From 1357 to 1366 Muslims in Quanzhou participated in the Ispah Rebellion, advancing northward and even capturing Putian and Fuzhou before the rebellion was crushed by the Yuan. Afterward, Quanzhou city lost foreign interest in trading and its formerly welcoming international image as the foreigners were all massacred or deported.

Yuan dynasty General Chen Youding, who had put down the Ispah Rebellion, continued to rule over the Fujian area even after the outbreak of the Red Turban Rebellion. Forces loyal to the eventual Ming dynasty founder Zhu Yuanzhang (Hongwu Emperor) defeated Chen in 1367.

=== Ming dynasty ===
After the establishment of the Ming dynasty, Fujian became a province, with its capital at Fuzhou. In the early Ming era, Fuzhou Changle was the staging area and supply depot of Zheng He's naval expeditions. Further development was severely hampered by the sea trade ban, and the area was superseded by nearby ports of Guangzhou, Hangzhou, Ningbo and Shanghai despite the lifting of the ban in 1550. Large-scale piracy by Wokou was eventually wiped out by the Chinese military.

An account of the Ming dynasty Fujian was written by No In (Lu Ren 鲁认).

The Pisheya appear in Quanzhou Ming era records.

=== Qing dynasty ===
The late Ming and early Qing dynasty symbolized an era of a large influx of refugees and another 20 years of sea trade ban under the Kangxi Emperor, a measure intended to counter the refuge Ming government of Koxinga in the island of Taiwan.

The sea ban implemented by the Qing forced many people to evacuate the coast to deprive Koxinga's Ming loyalists of resources. This has led to the myth that it was because Manchus were "afraid of water".

Incoming refugees did not translate into a major labor force, owing to their re-migration into prosperous regions of Guangdong. In 1683, the Qing dynasty conquered Taiwan in the Battle of Penghu and annexed it into Fujian, as the Taiwan Prefecture. Many more Han Chinese then settled in Taiwan. Today, most Taiwanese are descendants of Hokkien people from Southern Fujian. Fujian and Taiwan were originally treated as one province (Fujian-Taiwan-Province), but starting in 1885, they split into two separate provinces.

In the 1890s, the Qing ceded Taiwan to Japan via the Treaty of Shimonoseki after the First Sino-Japanese War. In 1905–1907 Japan made overtures to enlarge its sphere of influence to include Fujian. Japan was trying to obtain French loans and also avoid the Open Door Policy. Paris provided loans on condition that Japan respected the Open Door principles and didn't violate China's territorial integrity.

=== Republic of China ===
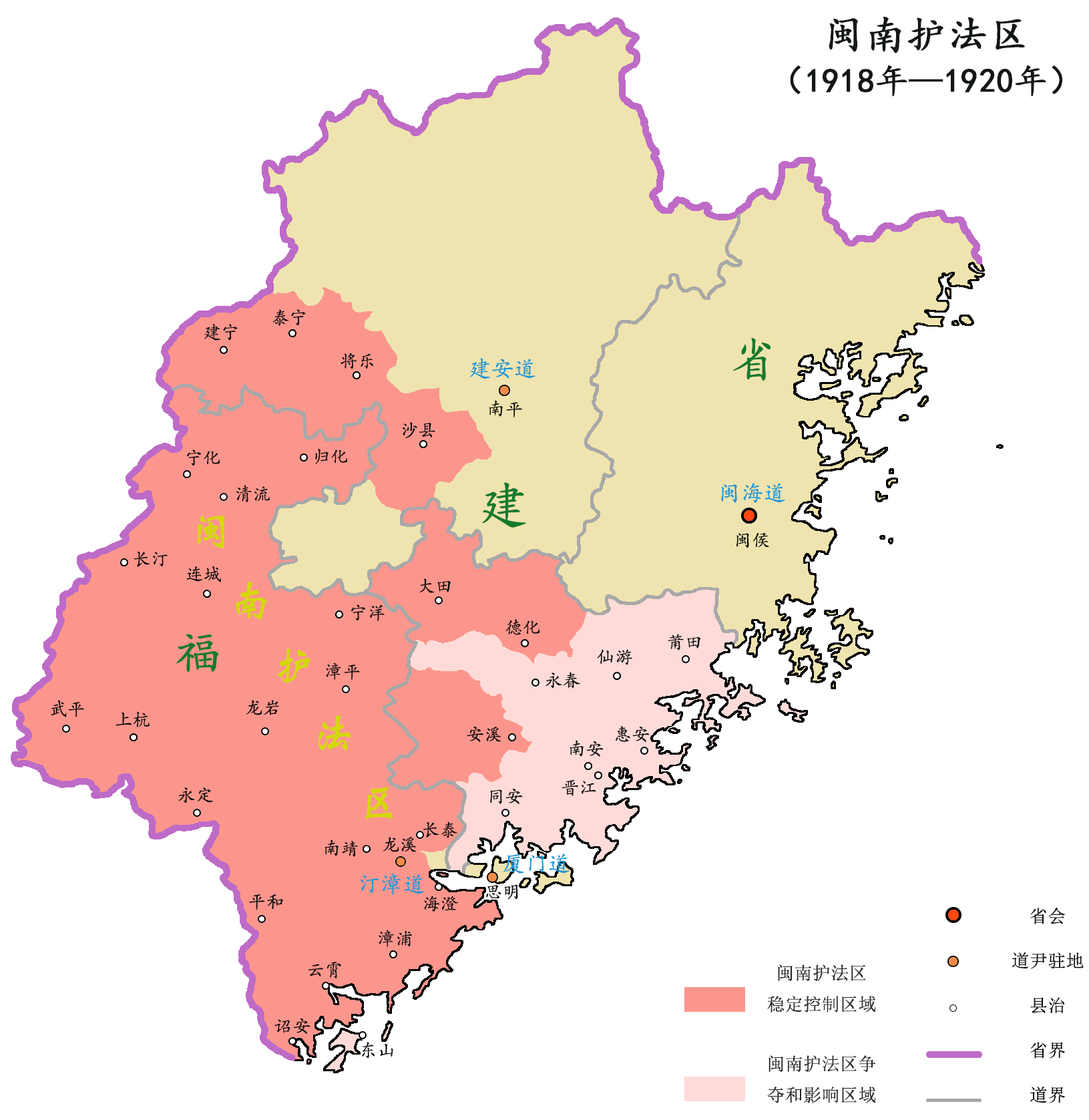
Map of the Constitution Protection Region of Southern Fujian

The Xinhai revolution overthrew the Qing dynasty and brought the province into the rule of the Republic of China.

The anarchist Constitution Protection Region of Southern Fujian was established by Chen Jiongming from 1918 to 1920.

Fujian briefly established the independent Fujian People's Government in 1933. It was re-controlled by the Republic of China in 1934.

Fujian came under a Japanese sea blockade during World War II.

=== People's Republic of China ===
Historical location of Fujian in the Republican era

After the Chinese Civil War, the People's Republic of China unified the country and took over most of Fujian, excluding the Quemoy and Matsu Islands.

In its early days, Fujian's development was relatively slow in comparison to other coastal provinces due to potential conflicts with Kuomintang-controlled Taiwan. Today, the province has the highest forest coverage rate while enjoying a high growth rate in the economy. The GDP per capita in Fujian is ranked 4-6th place among provinces of China in recent years.

Development has been accompanied by a large influx of population from the overpopulated areas to Fujian's north and west, and much of the farmland and forest, as well as cultural heritage sites such as the temples of king Wuzhu, have given way to ubiquitous high-rise buildings. Fujian faces challenges to sustain development while at the same time preserving Fujian's natural and cultural heritage.

In 2023, the Central Committee of the Chinese Communist Party and the State Council of China jointly proposed making Fujian a demonstration zone in cross-strait integration between Taiwan and mainland China. Under the plan, the Chinese government would boost economic and transportation cooperation with Taiwan and make it easier for Taiwanese people to live, buy property, access social services and study in Fujian.

== Geography ==
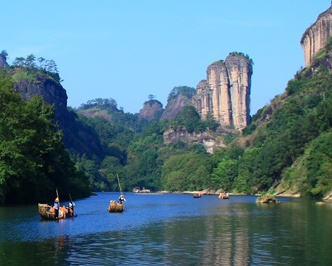
Wuyi Mountains

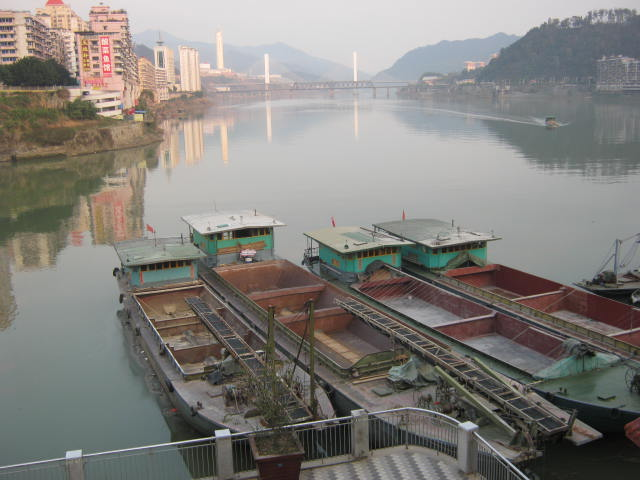
Min River in Nanping

The province is mostly mountainous and is traditionally said to be "eight parts mountain, one part water, and one part farmland" (八山一水一分田). The northwest is higher in altitude, with the Wuyi Mountains forming the border between Fujian and Jiangxi. It is the most forested provincial-level administrative region in China, with a 62.96% forest coverage rate in 2009. Fujian's highest point is Mount Huanggang in the Wuyi Mountains, with an altitude of 2,157 metres (1.340 mi).

Fujian faces East China Sea to the east, South China Sea to the south, and the Taiwan Strait to the southeast. The coastline is rugged and has many bays and islands. Major islands include Quemoy (also known as Kinmen, controlled by the Republic of China), Haitan Island, and Nanri Island. Meizhou Island occupies a central place in the cult of the goddess Matsu, the patron deity of Chinese sailors.

The Min River and its tributaries cut through much of northern and central Fujian. Other rivers include the Jin and the Jiulong. Due to its uneven topography, Fujian has many cliffs and rapids.

Fujian is separated from Taiwan by the 180 kilometres (110 mi)-wide Taiwan Strait. Some of the small islands in the Taiwan Strait are also part of the province. The islands of Kinmen and Matsu are under the administration of the Republic of China.

Fujian contains several faults, the result of a collision between the Asiatic Plate and the Philippine Sea Plate. The Changle-Naoao and Longan-Jinjiang fault zones in this area have annual displacement rates of 3–5 mm. They could cause major earthquakes in the future.

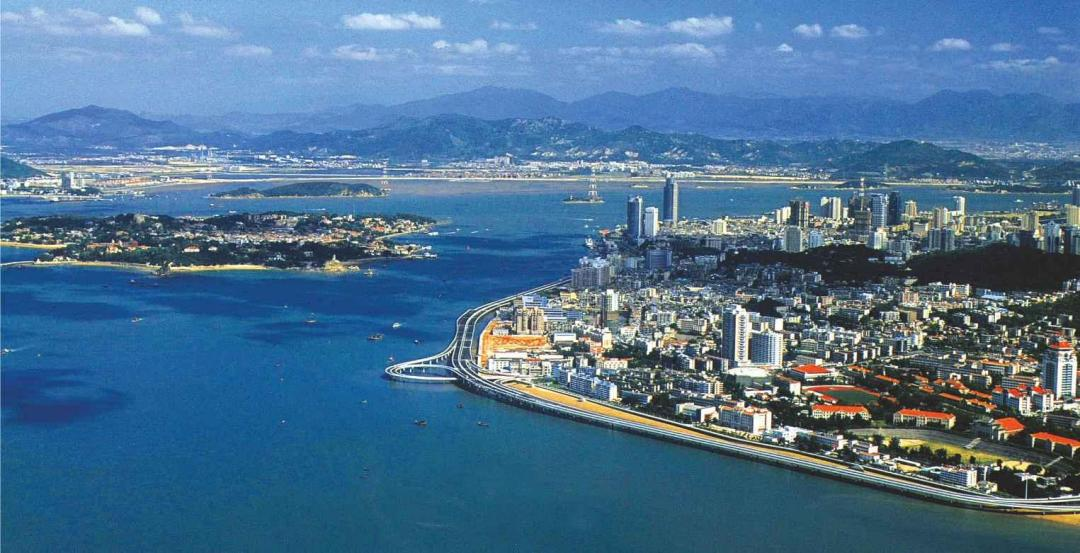
Xiamen in Southeastern Fujian

Fujian has a subtropical climate, with mild winters. In January, the coastal regions average around 7–10 °C (45–50 °F) while the hills average 6–8 °C (43–46 °F). In the summer, temperatures are high, and the province is threatened by typhoons coming in from the Pacific. Average annual precipitation is 1,400–2,000 millimetres (55–79 in).

== Transportation ==
=== Roads ===
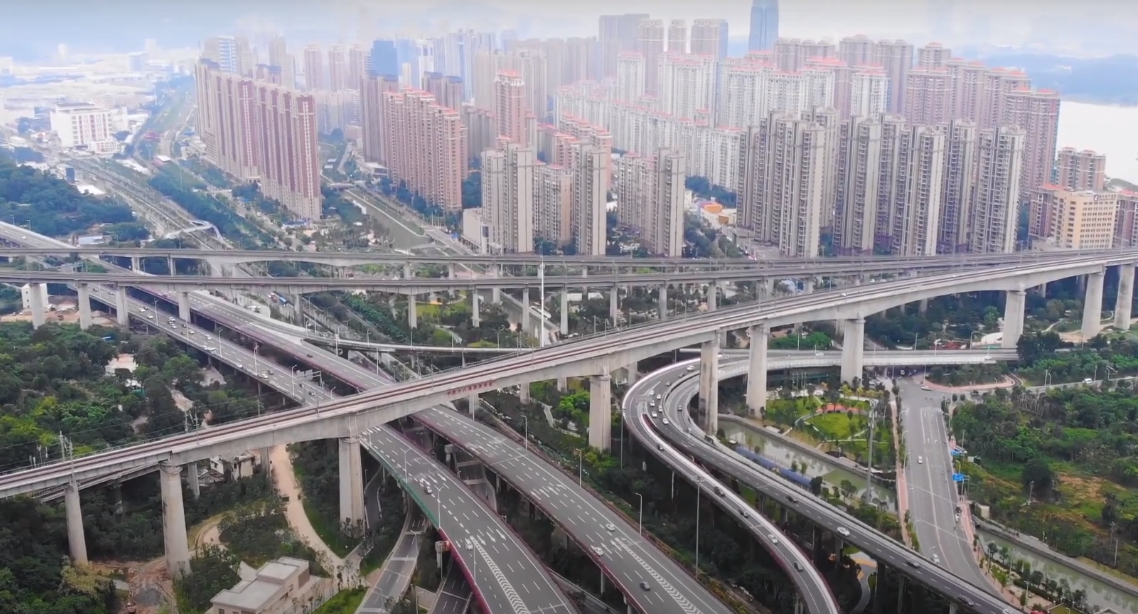
Kuiqi interchange in Fuzhou

As of 2012, there are 54,876 kilometres (34,098 miles) of highways in Fujian, including 3,500 kilometres (2,200 miles) of expressways. The top infrastructure projects in recent years have been the Zhangzhou-Zhaoan Expressway (US$624 million) and the Sanmingshi-Fuzhou expressway (US$1.40 billion). The 12th Five-Year Plan, covering the period from 2011 to 2015, aims to double the length of the province's expressways to 5,500 kilometres (3,400 mi).

=== Railways ===
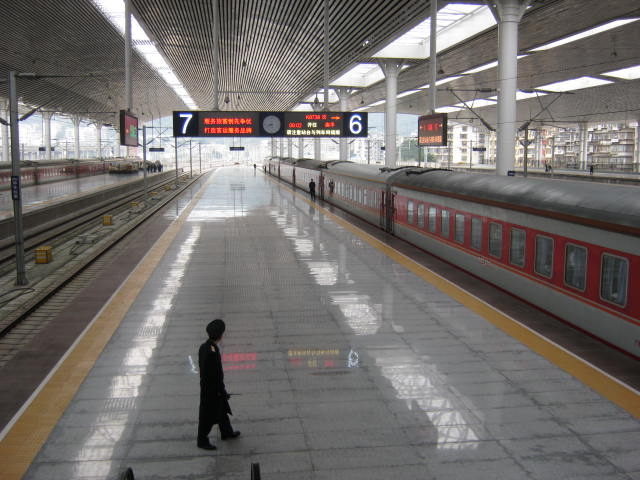
Fuzhou train station

Due to Fujian's mountainous terrain and traditional reliance on maritime transportation, railways came to the province comparatively late. The first rail links to neighboring Jiangxi, Guangdong, and Zhejiang Province, opened respectively, in 1959, 2000, and 2009. As of October 2013, Fujian has four rail links with Jiangxi to the northwest: the Yingtan–Xiamen Railway (opened 1957), the Hengfeng–Nanping Railway (1998), Ganzhou–Longyan Railway (2005) and the high-speed Xiangtang–Putian Railway (2013). Fujian's rail link to Guangdong to the west, the Zhangping–Longchuan Railway (2000), was joined with the high-speed Xiamen–Shenzhen Railway (Xiashen Line) in late 2013. The Xiashen Line forms the southernmost section of China's Southeast Coast High-Speed Rail Corridor. The Wenzhou–Fuzhou and Fuzhou–Xiamen sections of this corridor entered operation in 2009 and link Fujian with Zhejiang with trains running at speeds of up to 250 km/h (155 mph).

Within Fujian, coastal and interior cities are linked by the Nanping–Fuzhou (1959), Zhangping–Quanzhou–Xiaocuo (2007) and Longyan–Xiamen Railways, (2012). To attract Taiwanese investment, the province intends to increase its rail length by 50 percent to 2,500 km (1,553 mi).

=== Air ===
The major airports are Fuzhou Changle International Airport, Xiamen Gaoqi International Airport, Quanzhou Jinjiang International Airport, Nanping Wuyishan Airport, Longyan Guanzhishan Airport and Sanming Shaxian Airport. Xiamen is capable of handling 15.75 million passengers as of 2011. Fuzhou is capable of handling 6.5 million passengers annually with a cargo capacity of more than 200,000 tons. The airport offers direct links to 45 destinations including international routes to Japan, Malaysia, Thailand, Singapore, and Hong Kong.

== Administrative divisions ==
The People's Republic of China controls most of the province and divides it into nine prefecture-level divisions: all prefecture-level cities (including a sub-provincial city):

Administrative divisions of Fujian
Division code	Division	Area in km^{2}	Population 2020	Seat	Divisions		
Division code	Division	Area in km^{2}	Population 2020	Seat	Districts	Counties	CL cities
350000	Fujian Province	121,400.00	41,540,086	Fuzhou city	31	42	11
350100	Fuzhou city	12,155.46	8,291,268	Gulou District	6	6	1
350200	Xiamen city	1,699.39	5,163,970	Siming District	6		
350300	Putian city	4,119.02	3,210,714	Chengxiang District	4	1	
350400	Sanming city	22,928.79	2,486,450	Sanyuan District	2	8	1
350500	Quanzhou city	11,245.00	8,782,285	Fengze District	4	5*	3
350600	Zhangzhou city	12,873.33	5,054,328	Longwen District	4	7	
350700	Nanping city	26,280.54	2,645,548	Jianyang District	2	5	3
350800	Longyan city	19,028.26	2,723,637	Xinluo District	2	4	1
350900	Ningde city	13,452.38	3,146,789	Jiaocheng District	1	6	2
Sub-provincial cities * - including Kinmen County, ROC (Taiwan). Claimed by the PRC. (included in the total Counties' count)

Administrative divisions in Chinese and varieties of romanizations
English	Chinese	Pinyin	Fuzhou BUC	Hokkien POJ
Fujian Province	福建省	Fújiàn Shěng	Hók-gióng-sēng	Hok-kiàn-séng
Fuzhou city	福州市	Fúzhōu Shì	Hók-ciŭ-chê	Hok-chiu-chhī
Xiamen city	厦门市	Xiàmén Shì	Â-muòng-chê	Ē-mn̂g-chhī
Putian city	莆田市	Pútián Shì	Può-dièng-chê	Phô͘-chhân-chhī
Sanming city	三明市	Sānmíng Shì	Săng-mìng-chê	Sam-bêng-chhī
Quanzhou city	泉州市	Quánzhōu Shì	Ciòng-ciŭ-chê	Choân-chiu-chhī
Zhangzhou city	漳州市	Zhāngzhōu Shì	Ciŏng-ciŭ-chê	Chiang-chiu-chhī
Nanping city	南平市	Nánpíng Shì	Nàng-bìng-chê	Lâm-pêng-chhī
Longyan city	龙岩市	Lóngyán Shì	Lṳ̀ng-ngàng-chê	Lêng-nâ-chhī
Ningde city	宁德市	Níngdé Shì	Nìng-dáik-chê	Lêng-tek-chhī

All of the prefecture-level cities except Nanping, Sanming, and Longyan are found along the coast.

These nine prefecture-level cities are subdivided into 84 county-level divisions (31 districts, 11 county-level cities, and 42 counties). Those are in turn divided into 1,102 township-level divisions (653 towns, 233 townships, 19 ethnic townships, and 195 subdistricts).

The People's Republic of China claims five of the six townships of Kinmen County, Republic of China (Taiwan) as a county of the prefecture-level city of Quanzhou.

The PRC claims Wuqiu Township, Kinmen County, Republic of China (Taiwan) as part of Xiuyu District of the prefecture-level city of Putian.

Finally, the PRC claims Lienchiang County (Matsu Islands), Republic of China (Taiwan) as a township of its Lianjiang County, which is part of the prefecture-level city of Fuzhou.

Together, these three groups of islands make up the Republic of China's province of Fuchien.

Population by urban areas of prefecture & county cities
#	Cities	2020 Urban area	2010 Urban area	2020 City proper
1	Xiamen	4,617,251	3,119,110	5,163,970
2	Fuzhou (Note: Does not include Beigan Township, Dongyin Township, Juguang Township, & Nangan Township (controlled by ROC) in the city proper count.)	3,723,454	2,824,414 (Note: New district established after 2010 census: Changle (Changle CLC). The new district not included in the urban area count of the pre-expanded city.)	8,291,268
3	Putian	1,539,389	1,107,199	3,210,714
4	Quanzhou (Note: Does not include Kinmen County (controlled by ROC) in the city proper count.)	1,469,157	1,154,731	8,782,285
5	Jinjiang	1,416,151	1,172,827	see Quanzhou
6	Nan'an	936,897	718,516	see Quanzhou
7	Longyan	886,281	460,086 (Note: New district established after 2010 census: Yongding (Yongding County). The new district not included in the urban area count of the pre-expanded city.)	2,723,637
8	Zhangzhou	845,286	614,700	5,054,328
9	Fuqing	744,774	470,824	see Fuzhou
10	Shishi	589,902	469,969	see Quanzhou
11	Longhai	584,371	422,993	see Zhangzhou
12	Nanping	537,472	301,370 (Note: New district established after 2010 census: Jianyang (Jianyang CLC). The new district not included in the urban area count of the pre-expanded city.)	2,680,645
13	Ningde	425,499	252,497	3,146,789
14	Fu'an	397,068	326,019	see Ningde
15	Sanming	378,423	328,766	2,486,450
16	Fuding	351,341	266,779	see Ningde
17	Yong'an	248,425	213,732	see Sanming
18	Jian'ou	226,100	192,557	see Nanping
19	Shaowu	217,836	183,457	see Nanping
20	Wuyishan	159,308	122,801	see Nanping
21	Zhangping	147462	113,739	see Longyan
—	Changle	see Fuzhou	278,007	see Fuzhou
—	Jianyang	see Nanping	150,756	see Nanping

Most populous cities in Fujian Source: China Urban Construction Statistical Yearbook 2018 Urban Population and Urban Temporary Population
Rank		Pop.	Rank		Pop.
1	Xiamen	3,499,800	11	Nan'an	318,000
2	Fuzhou	3,007,100	12	Ningde	282,200
3	Quanzhou	1,365,000	13	Sanming	241,200
4	Putian	771,000	14	Longhai	219,400
5	Zhangzhou	528,800	15	Fuding	178,000
6	Longyan	456,300	16	Yong'an	175,100
7	Fuqing	361,100	17	Fu'an	169,200
8	Nanping	356,600	18	Jian'ou	142,100
9	Shishi	355,800	19	Zhangping	129,300
10	Jinjiang	335,000	20	Shaowu	122,800

== List of provincial-level leaders ==
=== CCP Party Secretaries ===
1. Zhang Dingcheng (张鼎丞): 1949–1954
2. Ye Fei (叶飞): 1954–1958
3. Jiang Yizhen (江一真): 1958–1970
4. Han Xianchu (韩先楚): 1971–1973
5. Liao Zhigao (廖志高): 1974–1982
6. Xiang Nan (项南): 1982–1986
7. Chen Guangyi (陈光毅): 1986–1993
8. Jia Qinglin (贾庆林): 1993–1996
9. Chen Mingyi (陈明义): 1996–2000
10. Song Defu (宋德福): 2000–2004
11. Lu Zhangong (卢展工): 2004–2009
12. Sun Chunlan (孙春兰): 2009–2012
13. You Quan (尤权): 2012–2017
14. Yu Weiguo (于伟国): 2017–2020
15. Yin Li (尹力): 2020–2022
16. Zhou Zuyi (周祖翼): 2022–2026
17. Zhao Long (赵龙): 2026–present

=== Chairpersons of Fujian People's Congress ===
1. Liao Zhigao (廖志高): 1979–1982
2. Hu Hong (胡宏): 1982–1985
3. Cheng Xu (程序): 1985–1993
4. Chen Guangyi (陈光毅): 1993–1994
5. Jia Qinglin (贾庆林): 1994–1998
6. Yuan Qitong (袁启彤): 1998–2002
7. Song Defu (宋德福): 2002–2005
8. Lu Zhangong (卢展工): 2005–2010
9. Sun Chunlan (孙春兰): 2010–2013
10. You Quan (尤权): 2013–2018
11. Yu Weiguo (于伟国): 2018–2021
12. Yin Li (尹力): 2021–2023
13. Zhou Zuyi (周祖翼): 2023–present

=== Governors ===
1. Zhang Dingcheng (张鼎丞): 1949–1954
2. Ye Fei (叶飞): 1954–1959
3. Jiang Yizhen (江一真): 1959
4. Wu Hongxiang (伍洪祥): acting: 1960–1962
5. Jiang Yizhen (江一真): 1962
6. Wei Jinshui (魏金水): 1962–1967
7. Han Xianchu (韩先楚): 1967–1973
8. Liao Zhigao (廖志高): 1974–1979
9. Ma Xingyuan (马兴元): 1979–1983
10. Hu Ping (胡平): 1983–1987
11. Wang Zhaoguo (王兆国): 1987–1990
12. Jia Qinglin (贾庆林): 1990–1994
13. Chen Mingyi (陈明义): 1994–1996
14. He Guoqiang (贺国强): 1996–1999
15. Xi Jinping (习近平): 1999–2002
16. Lu Zhangong (卢展工): 2002–2004
17. Huang Xiaojing (黄小晶): 2004–2011
18. Su Shulin (苏树林): 2011–2015
19. Yu Weiguo (于伟国): 2015–2018
20. Tang Dengjie (唐登杰): 2018–2020
21. Wang Ning (王宁): 2020–2021
22. Zhao Long (赵龙): 2021–2026
23. Guo Ningning (郭宁宁): 2026–present

== Economy ==
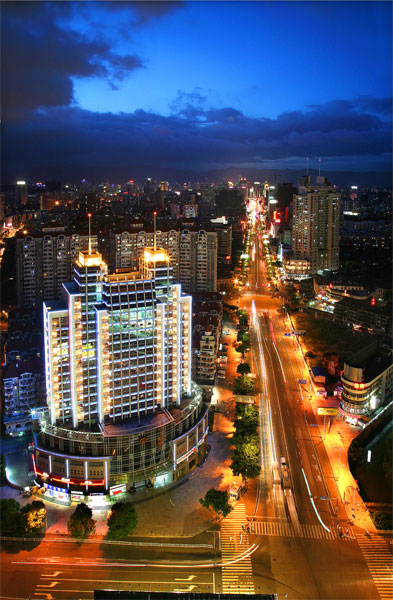
Fuzhou, the capital and largest city in Fujian

Fujian is one of the more affluent provinces in China, with many industries spanning tea production, clothing, and sports manufacturers such as Anta, 361 Degrees, Xtep, Peak Sport Products and Septwolves. Fujian was one of the first provinces in China authorized by the central government to receive foreign investments. Many foreign firms have operations in Fujian. They include Boeing, Dell, GE, Kodak, Nokia, Siemens, Swire, TDK, and Panasonic. Within Fujian, the city of Xiamen was one of China's first special economic zones ("SEZs").

In 2022, Fujian's GDP was CN¥5.31 trillion (US$790 billion in nominal), ranking 8th in GDP nationwide and appearing in the world's top 20 largest sub-national economies. Along with its coastal neighbours Zhejiang and Guangdong, Fujian's GDP per capita is above the national average, at CN¥126,829 (US$18,856 in nominal), the second highest GDP per capita of all Chinese provinces after Jiangsu. The primary, secondary and tertiary economy respectively contributed to ¥307 billion ($45.7 billion), ¥2.51 trillion ($372.8 billion), and ¥2.50 trillion ($371 billion) to Fujian's economy.

Historical GDP of Fujian for 1952 –present (SNA2008) (purchasing power parity of Chinese Yuan, as Int'l.dollar based on IMF WEO October 2017)
year	GDP				GDP per capita (GDPpc) based on mid-year population			Reference index	
year	GDP in millions			real growth (%)	GDPpc			exchange rate 1 foreign currency to CNY	
year	CNY	USD	PPP (Int'l$.)	real growth (%)	CNY	USD	PPP (Int'l$.)	USD 1	Int'l$. 1 (PPP)
2016	2,881,060	433,744	822,948	8.4	74,707	11,247	21,339	6.6423	3.5009
2015	2,623,920	421,283	739,237	9.0	68,645	11,021	19,339	6.2284	3.5495
2014	2,429,260	395,465	684,221	9.9	64,097	10,434	18,053	6.1428	3.5504
2013	2,207,780	356,485	617,233	11.0	58,702	9,478	16,411	6.1932	3.5769
2012	1,988,380	314,991	559,981	11.4	53,250	8,436	14,997	6.3125	3.5508
2011	1,770,380	274,104	505,029	12.3	47,764	7,395	13,625	6.4588	3.5055
2010	1,484,580	219,304	448,432	13.9	40,320	5,956	12,179	6.7695	3.3106
2009	1,232,420	180,416	390,315	12.3	33,677	4,930	10,666	6.8310	3.1575
2008	1,088,940	156,793	342,779	13.0	29,938	4,311	9,424	6.9451	3.1768
2007	930,190	122,329	308,531	15.2	25,730	3,384	8,534	7.6040	3.0149
2006	762,740	95,680	265,052	14.8	21,226	2,663	7,376	7.9718	2.8777
2005	658,860	80,430	230,451	11.6	18,448	2,252	6,453	8.1917	2.8590
2000	376,454	45,474	138,438	9.3	11,194	1,352	4,117	8.2784	2.7193
1990	52,228	10,919	30,675	7.5	1,763	369	1,035	4.7832	1.7026
1980	8,706	5,810	5,821	18.4	348	232	233	1.4984	1.4955
1978	6,637	4,268		17.8	273	176		1.5550	
1970	3,470	1,410		9.9	173	70		2.4618	
1962	2,212	899		98.6	137	56		2.4618	
1957	2,203	846		6.7	154	59		2.6040	
1952	1,273	573		23.3	102	46		2.2227	

In terms of agricultural land, Fujian is hilly and farmland is sparse. Rice is the main crop, supplemented by sweet potatoes and wheat and barley. Cash crops include sugar cane and rapeseed. Fujian leads the provinces of China in longan production, and is also a major producer of lychees and tea. Seafood is another important product, with shellfish production especially prominent.

Because of its geographic location with Taiwan, Fujian has been considered the battlefield frontline in a potential war between mainland China and Taiwan. Hence, it received much less investment from the Chinese central government and developed much slower than the rest of China before 1978. Since 1978, when China opened to the world, Fujian has received significant investment from overseas Fujianese around the world, Taiwanese and foreign investment.

Minnan Golden Triangle, which includes Xiamen, Quanzhou, and Zhangzhou, accounts for 40 percent of the GDP of Fujian.

Fujian will be the major economic beneficiary of the opening up of direct transport with Taiwan, which commenced on December 15, 2008. This includes direct flights from Taiwan to major Fujian cities such as Xiamen and Fuzhou. In addition, ports in Xiamen, Quanzhou, and Fuzhou will upgrade their port infrastructure for increased economic trade with Taiwan.

Fujian is the host of China International Fair for Investment and Trade annually. It is held in Xiamen to promote foreign investment for all of China.

=== Economic and Technological Development Zones ===
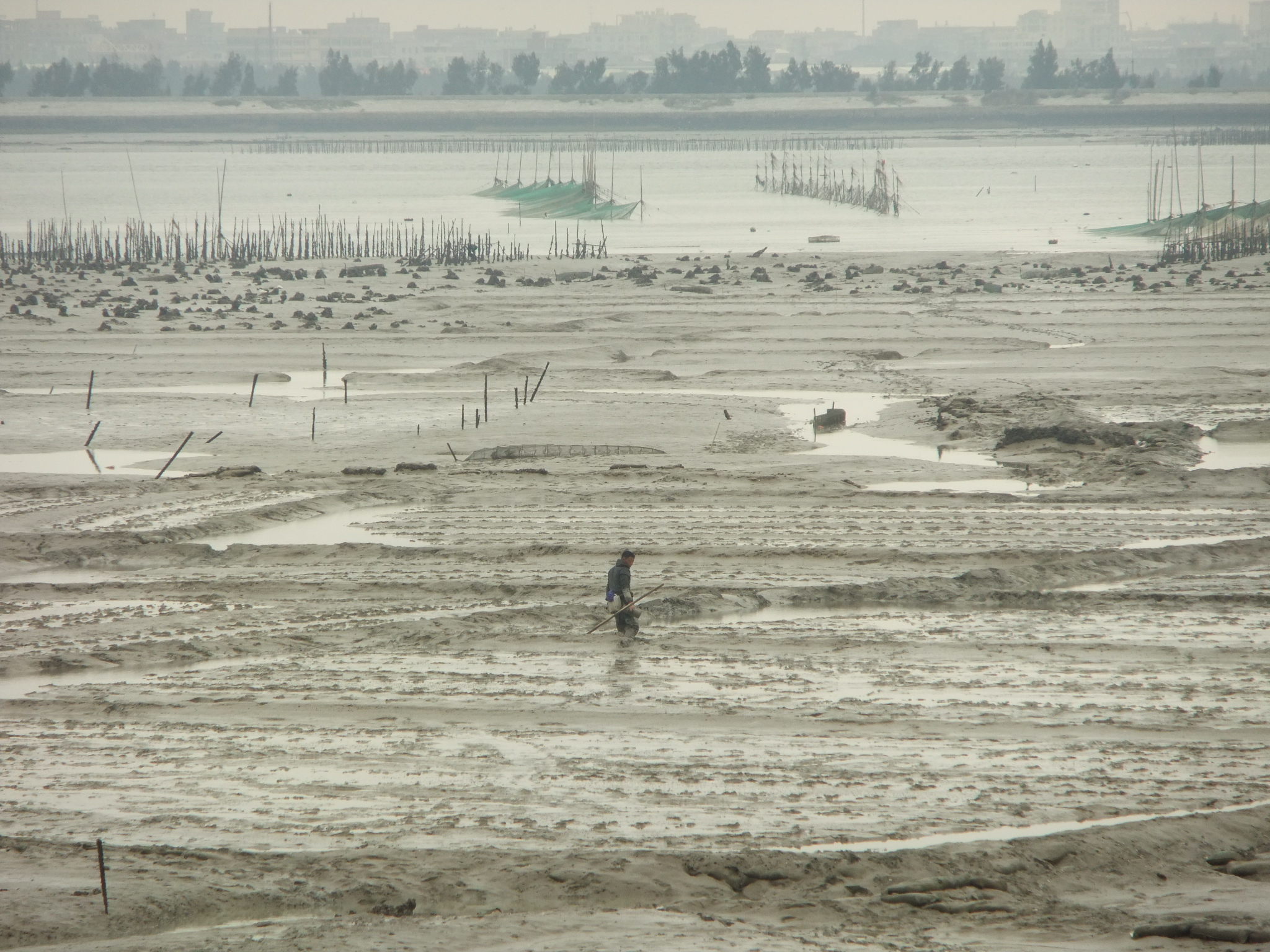
Mud clams, oysters, and shrimp are raised in Anhai Bay off Shuitou.

- Dongshan Economic and Technology Development Zone
- Fuzhou Economic & Technical Development Zone
- Fuzhou Free Trade Zone
- Fuzhou Hi-Tech Park
- Fuzhou Taiwan Merchant Investment Area
- Jimei Taiwan Merchant Investment Area
- Meizhou Island National Tourist Holiday Resort
- Wuyi Mountain National Tourist Holiday Resort
- Xiamen Export Processing Zone
- Xiamen Free Trade Zone
- Xiamen Haicang Economic and Technological Development Zone
- Xiamen Torch New & Hi-Tech Industrial Development Zone (Chinese version)
- Xinglin Taiwan Merchant Investment Area

== Demographics ==
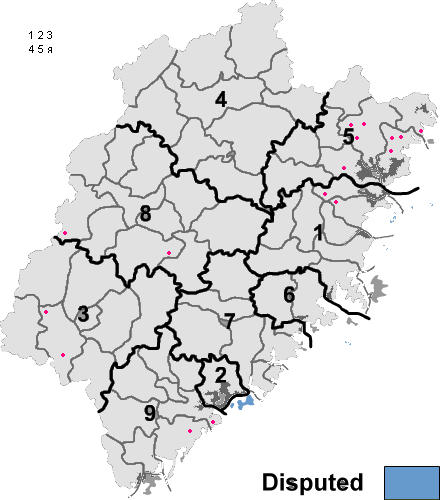
The ethnic townships in Fujian

As of 1832, the province was described as having an estimated "population of fourteen millions." In 2021, Fujian's population was estimated to be 41.87 million, with an urbanization rate of 69.7%.

Fujianese who are legally classified as Han Chinese make up 98% of the population. Various Min Chinese speakers make up the largest subgroups classified as Han Chinese in Fujian, such as Fuzhounese people, Putian people, Hoklo people and Fuzhou Tanka.

The Hakka, a Chinese sub-branch with their own distinct identity, mostly live in the southwestern parts of Fujian. The She, an ethnic group scattered over mountainous regions in the north, is the largest minority ethnic group of the province.

Many ethnic Chinese around the world (especially in Southeast Asia) trace their ancestries to the Fujianese branches of the Hoklo and Teochew peoples. Descendants of Southern Min-speaking emigrants make up the majorities of ethnic-Chinese populations in Taiwan, Malaysia, Singapore, Brunei, Thailand, Indonesia, and Philippines. Eastern Min-speaking people (especially Fuzhounese people) are one of the major sources of Chinese immigrants to the United States since the 1990s.

=== Religion ===
Religion in Fujian (Note: The data was collected by the Chinese General Social Survey (CGSS) of 2009 and by the Chinese Spiritual Life Survey of 2007, reported and assembled by Xiuhua Wang (2015) to confront the proportion of people identifying with two similar social structures: ① Christian churches, and ② the traditional Chinese religion of the lineage (i. e. people believing and worshipping ancestral deities often organised into lineage "churches" and ancestral shrines). Data for other religions with a significant presence in China (deity cults, Buddhism, Taoism, folk religious sects, Islam, et al.) was not reported by Wang.)
1. Chinese ancestral religion (31.3%)
2. Christianity (3.50%)
3. Other religions or not religious people (Note: This may include: Buddhists; Confucians; Deity worshippers; Taoists; Members of folk religious sects; Chinese Muslims; And people not bound to, nor practicing any, institutional or diffuse religion.) (65.2%)

The predominant religions in Fujian are Chinese folk religions, Taoist traditions, and Chinese Buddhism. According to surveys conducted in 2007 and 2009, just over 30% of the population believes and is involved in Chinese ancestral religion; 3.5% of the population identifies as Christian. The reports did not give figures for other religions; 65.19% of the population may be irreligious or involved in Chinese folk religion, Buddhism, Confucianism, Taoism, Chinese salvationist religions, or Islam. Notably, Fujian is one of the only places in the world where Manichaeism may still be practiced.

In 2010, there were reportedly just under 116,000 Muslims in Fujian.

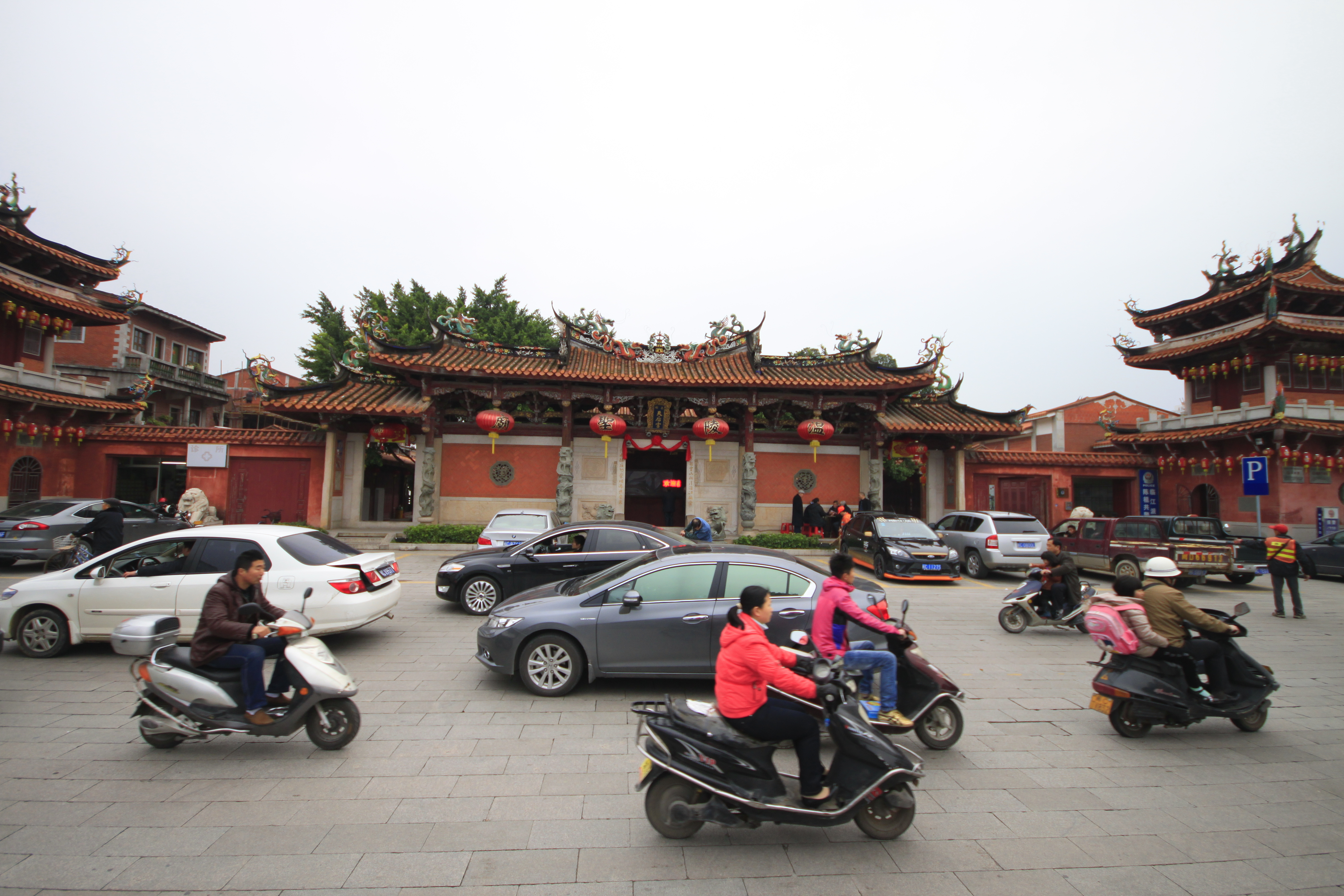
Temple of Tianhou (the Queen of Heaven) in Quanzhou

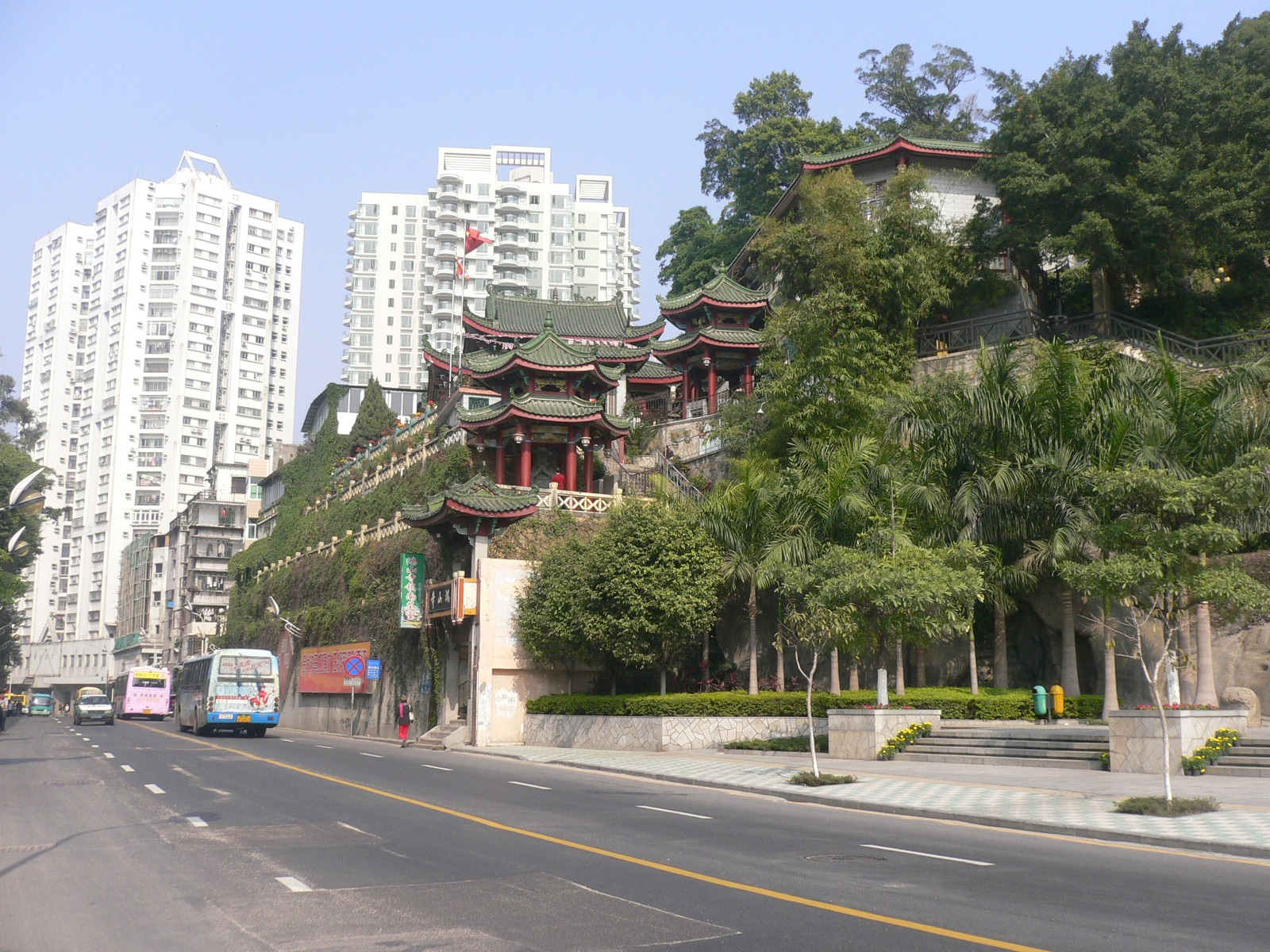
A roadside Buddhist temple in Siming, Xiamen

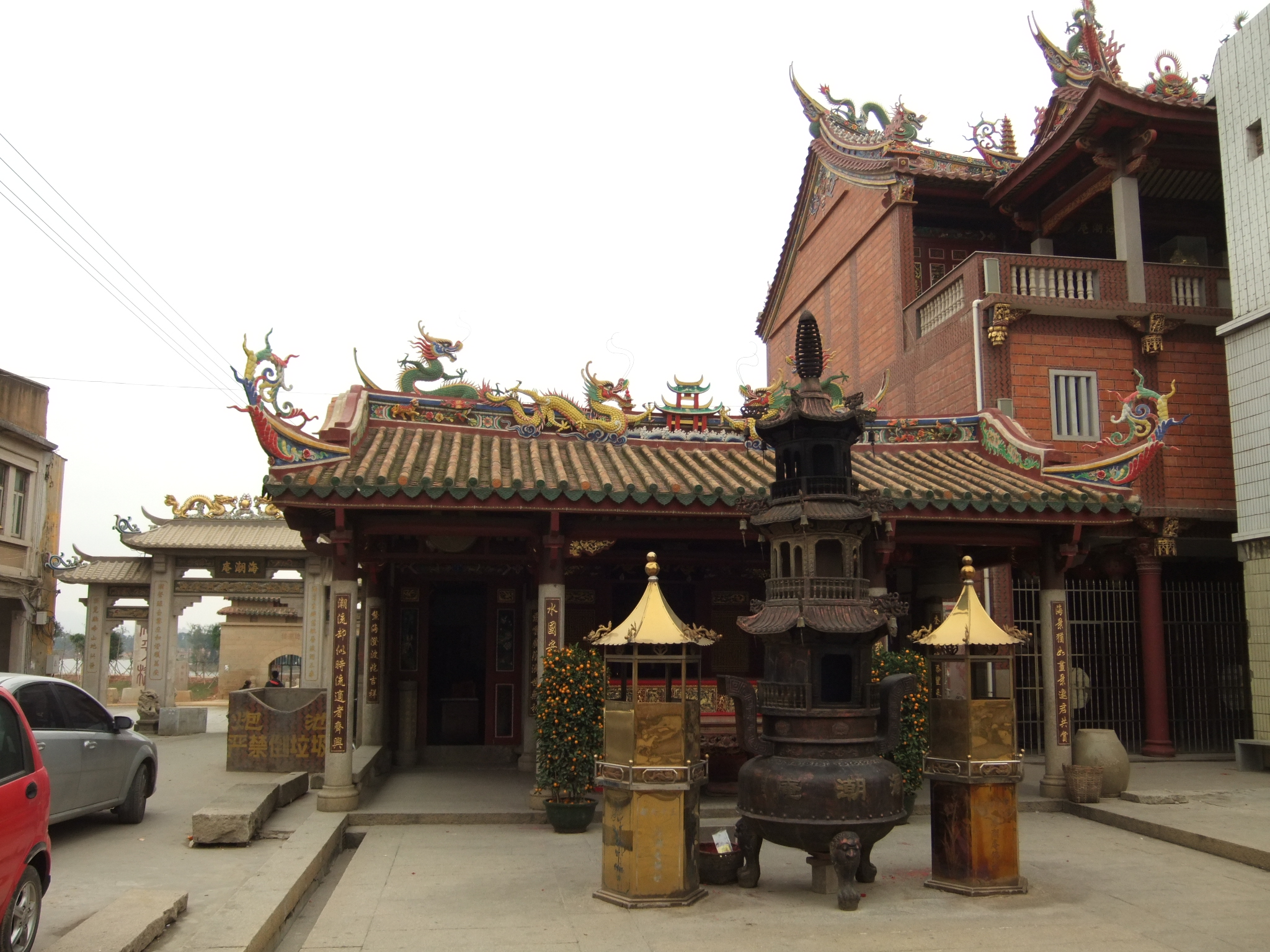
A small folk temple in Shuitou

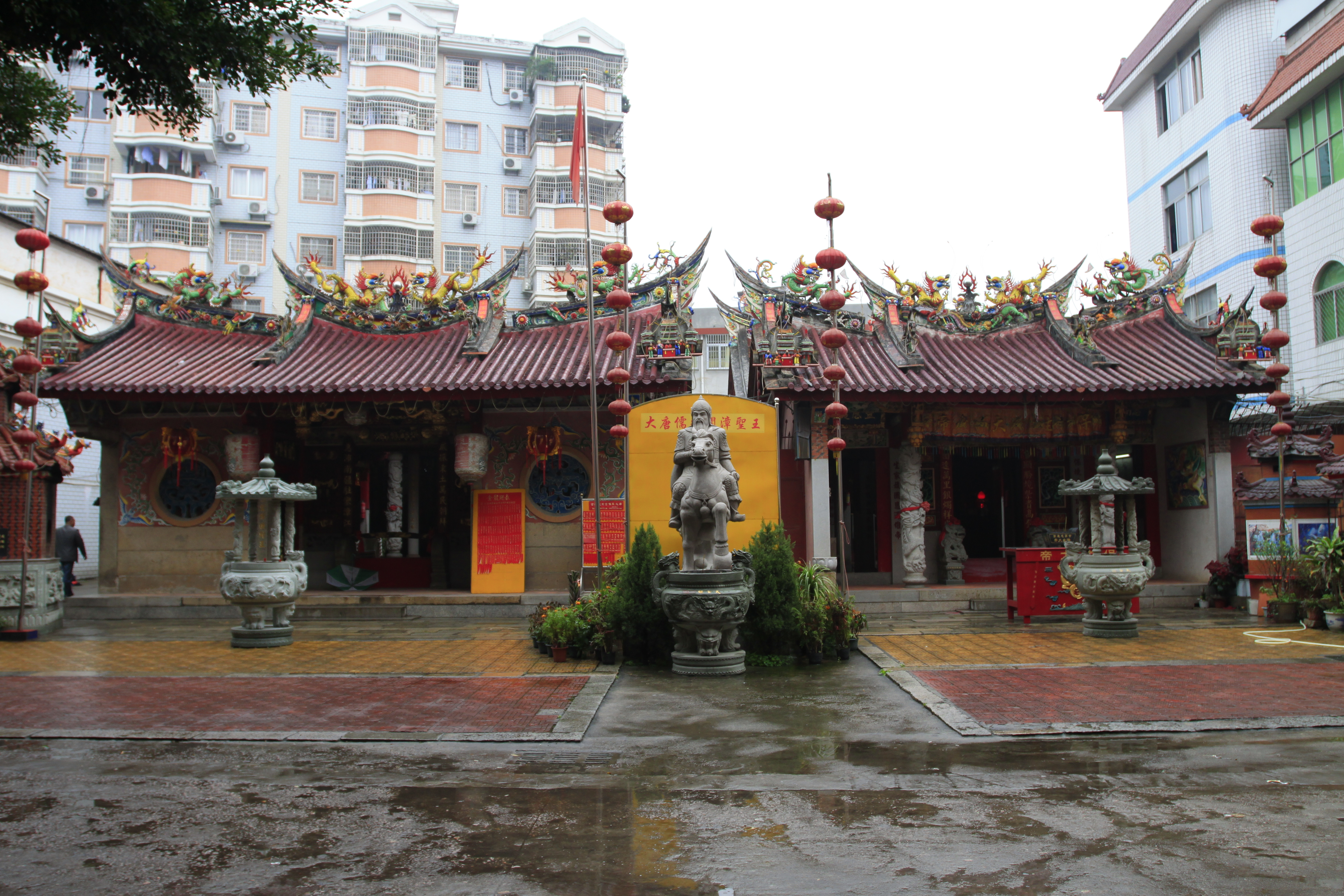
A folk temple in Zhangzhou

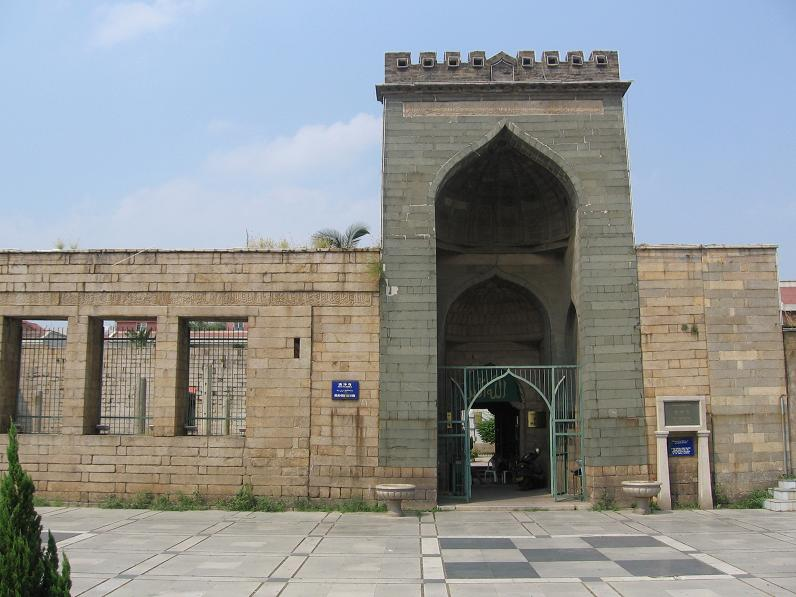
One of the oldest mosques in China is located in Quanzhou.

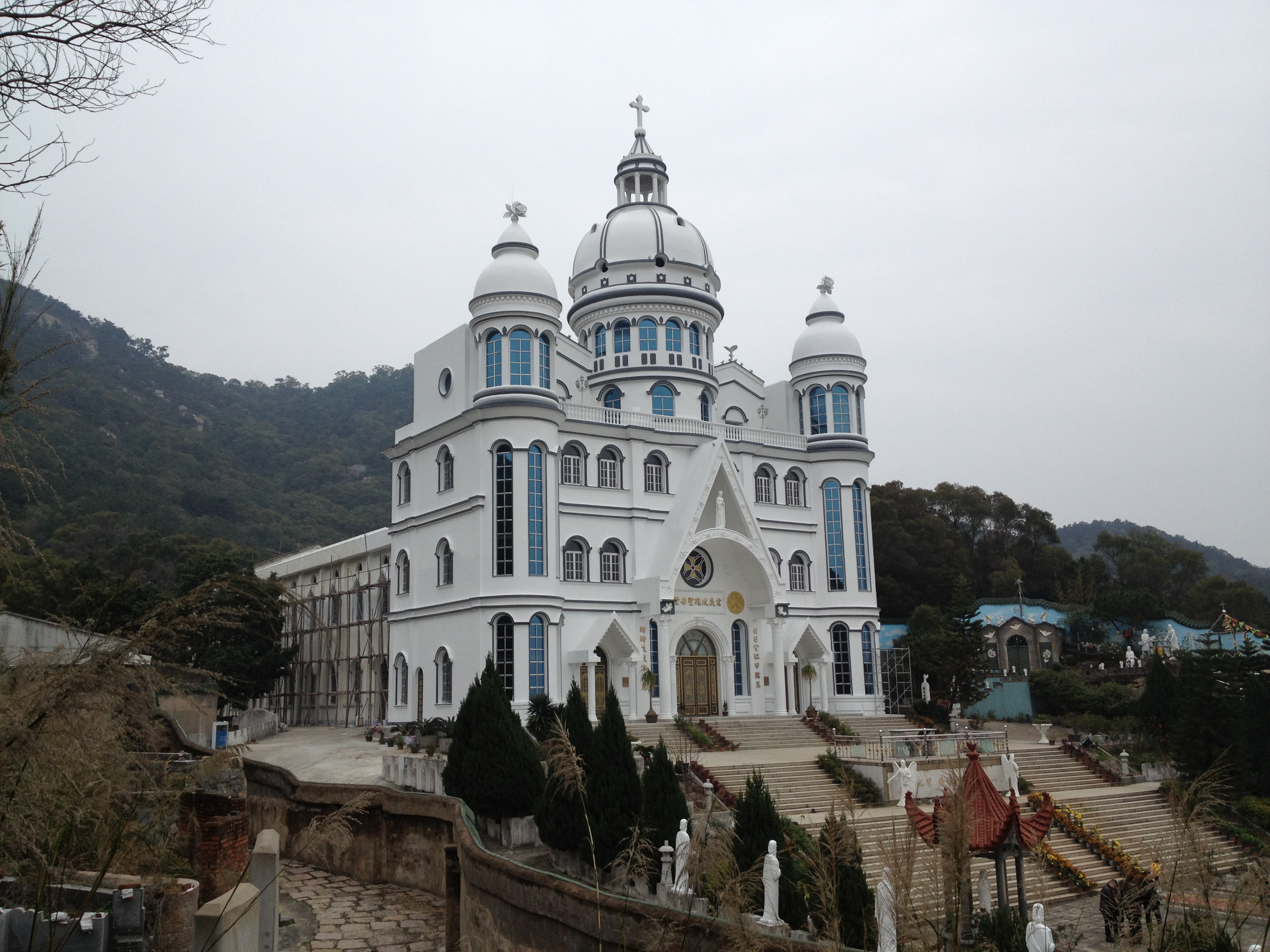
Rare Rose Hill Catholic parish in Fuzhou

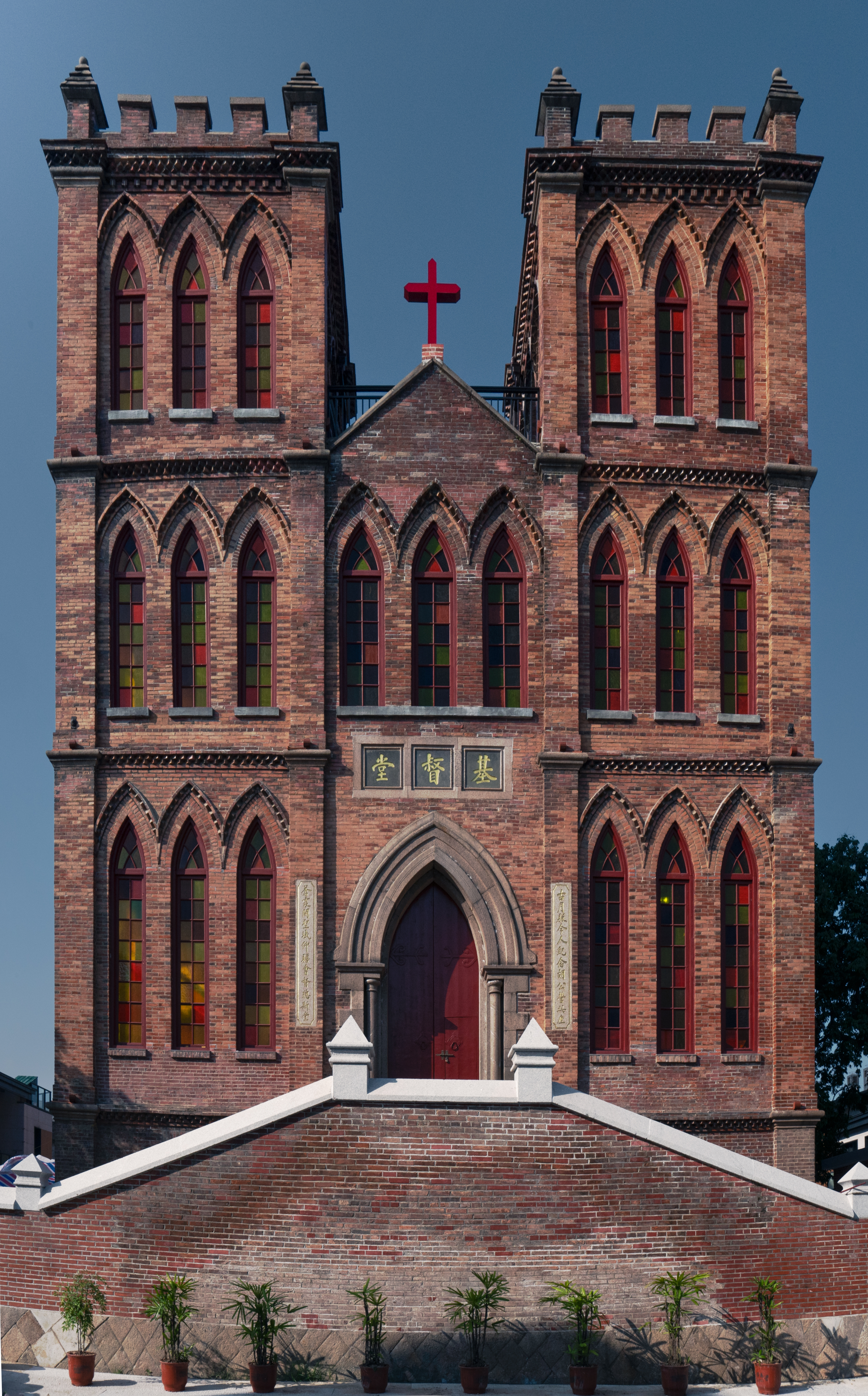
Christ Church in Cangxia, Fuzhou

== Culture ==
Min Chinese in Fujian Province:
- Southern Min
- Pu-Xian
- Eastern Min
- Northern Min
- Central Min
- Shao-Jiang

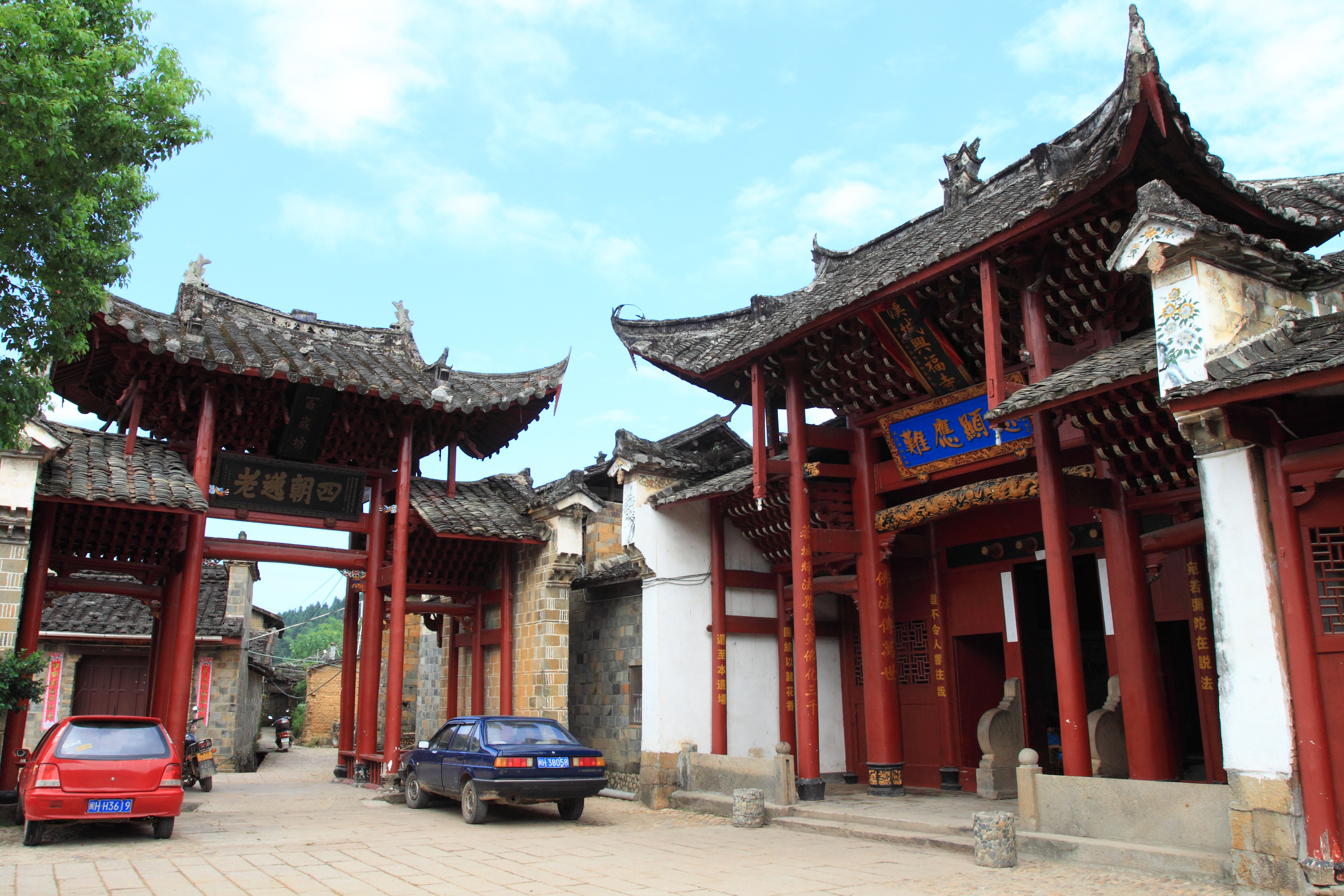
Ancient temple in Fujian

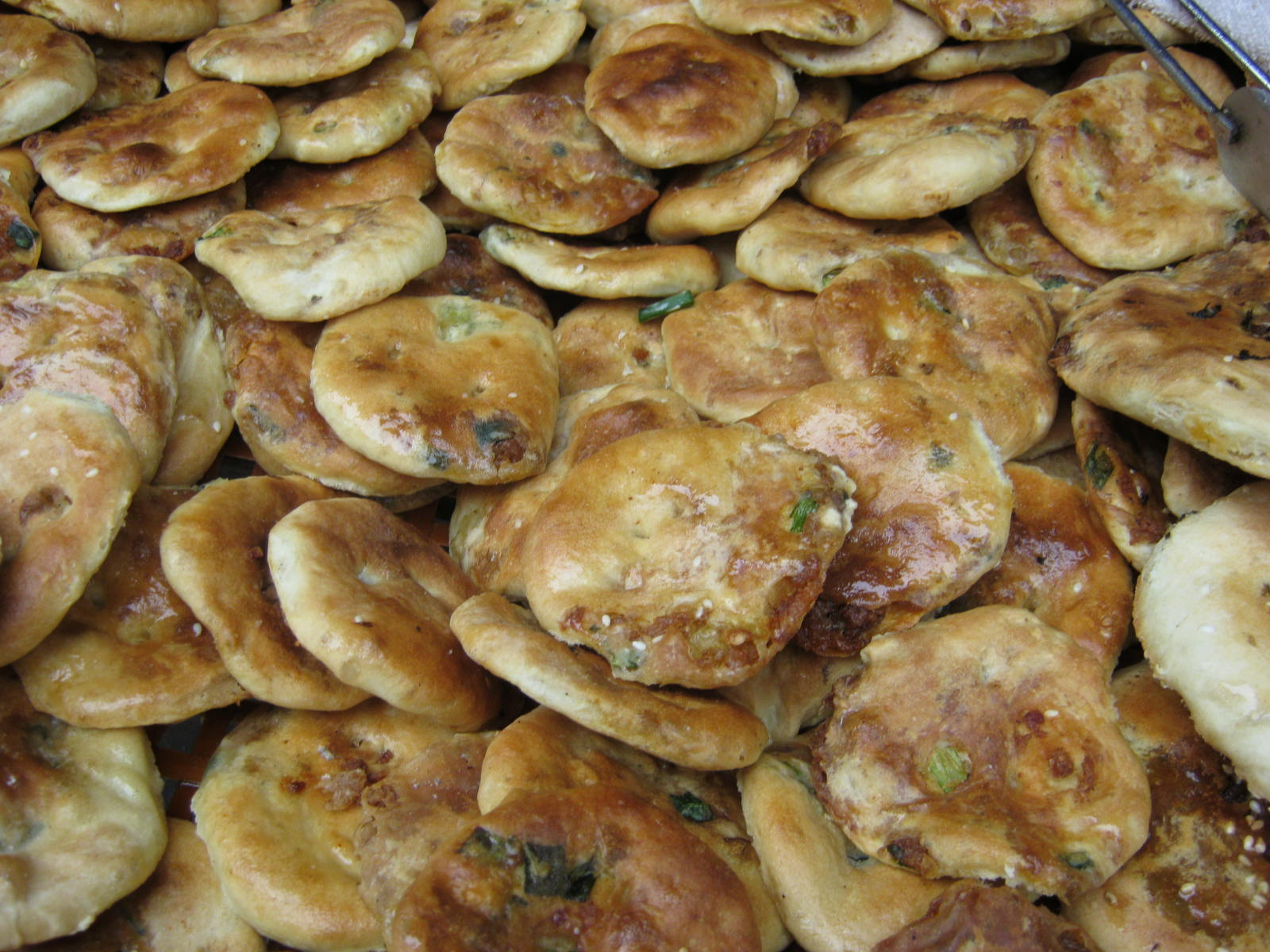
Kompyang (房村光餅) sold on the streets of Fujian cities

Because of its mountainous nature and waves of migration from central China and assimilation of numerous foreign ethnic groups such as maritime traders in the course of history, Fujian is one of the most culturally and linguistically diverse provinces in China. Local dialects can become unintelligible within 10 kilometres (6.2 mi), and the regional cultures and ethnic composition can be completely different from each other as well. This is reflected in the expression that "if you drive five miles in Fujian the culture changes, and if you drive ten miles, the language does". Most varieties spoken in Fujian are assigned to a broad Min category. Recent classifications subdivide Min into

- Eastern Min (the former Northern group), including the Fuzhou dialect
- Northern Min, spoken in inland northern areas
- Pu-Xian, spoken in central coastal areas
- Central Min, spoken in the west of the province
- Shao-Jiang, spoken in the northwest
- Southern Min, including the Amoy dialect and Taiwanese

The seventh subdivision of Min, Qiong Wen, is not spoken in Fujian. Hakka, another subdivision of spoken Chinese, is spoken around Longyan by the Hakka people who live there.

As is true of other provinces, the official language in Fujian is Mandarin, which is used for communication between people of different localities, although native Fujian peoples still converse in their native languages and dialects respectively.

Several regions of Fujian have their own form of Chinese opera. Min opera is popular around Fuzhou; Gaojiaxi around Jinjiang and Quanzhou; Xiangju around Zhangzhou; Fujian Nanqu throughout the south, and Puxianxi around Putian and Xianyou County.

Fujian cuisine, with an emphasis on seafood, is one of the eight great traditions of Chinese cuisine. It is composed of traditions from various regions, including Fuzhou cuisine, Taiwanese cuisine, Hokkien cuisine and Teochew cuisine. The most prestigious dish is Fotiaoqiang (literally "Buddha jumps over the wall"), a complex dish making use of many ingredients, including shark fin, sea cucumber, abalone and Shaoxing wine (a type of Chinese alcoholic beverage).

Many well-known teas originate from Fujian, including oolong, Wuyi Yancha, Lapsang souchong and Fuzhou jasmine tea. Indeed, the tea processing techniques for three major classes of tea, namely, oolong, white tea, and black tea were all developed in the province. Fujian tea ceremony is an elaborate way of preparing and serving tea. The English word "tea" is borrowed from Hokkien. Mandarin and Cantonese pronounce the word chá.

Nanyin is a popular form of music of Fujian.

Fuzhou bodiless lacquer ware, a noted type of lacquer ware, is noted for using a body of clay and/or plaster to form its shape; the body later removed. Fuzhou is also known for Shoushan stone carvings.

== Tourism ==
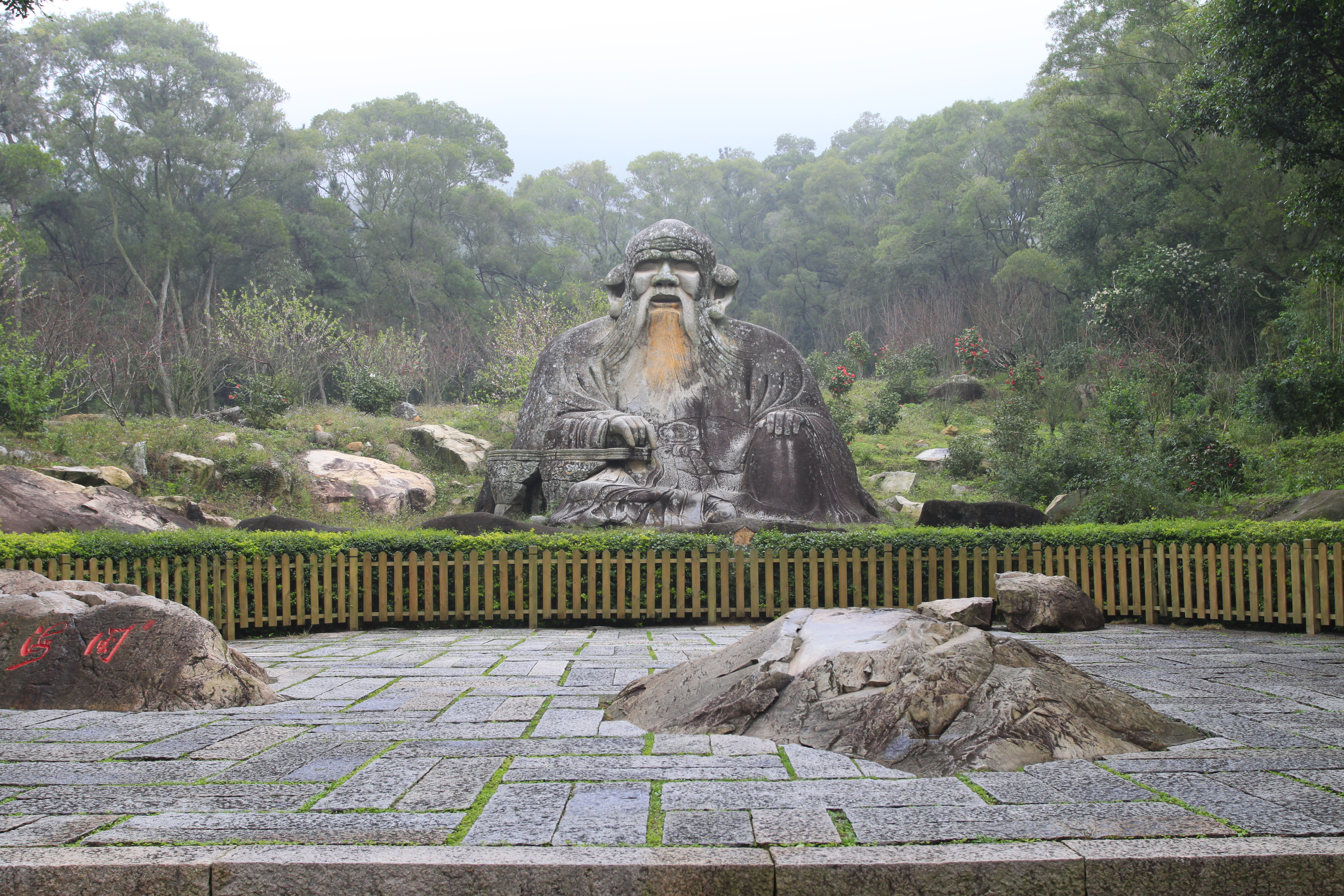
Stone Statue of Laozi.

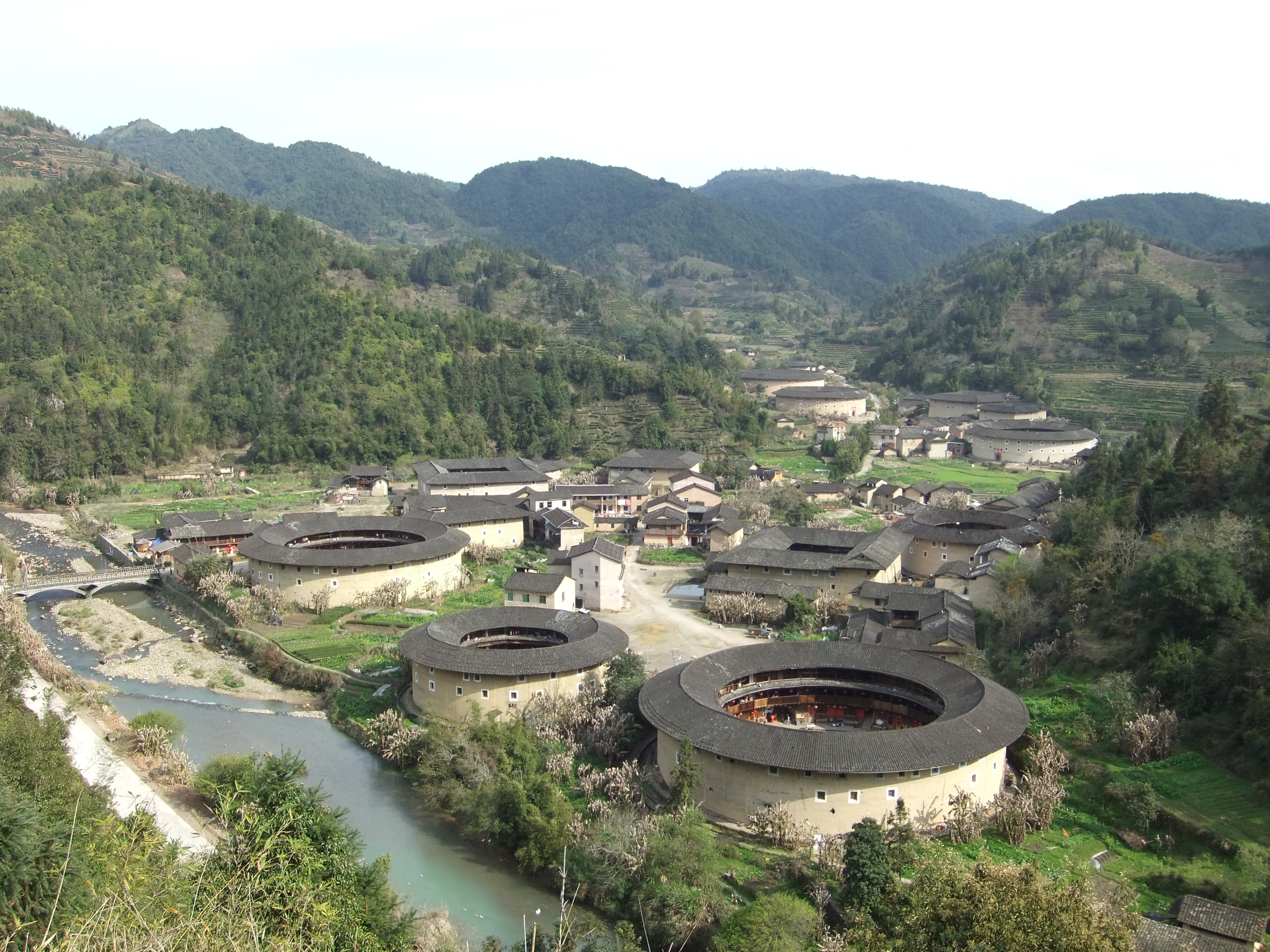
Hekeng village, in Shuyang Town, is one of the many tulou villages of Fujian's Nanjing County.

Fujian is home to several tourist attractions, including four UNESCO World Heritage Sites, one of the highest in China.

=== Cultural features ===
The Fujian Tulou are Chinese rural dwellings unique to the Hakka in southwest Fujian. These 46 buildings were listed by the UNESCO as one of the World Heritage Sites in 2008.

Gulangyu Island, Xiamen, is notable for its beaches, winding lanes, and rich architecture. The island is on China's list of National Scenic Spots and is classified as a 5A tourist attraction by the China National Tourism Administration (CNTA). It was listed by the UNESCO as one of the World Heritage Site in 2017. Also in Xiamen is the South Putuo Temple.

The Guanghua Temple is a Buddhist temple in Putian. It was built in the penultimate year of the Southern Chen dynasty. Located in the northern half of the mouth of Meizhou Bay, it is about 1.8 nautical miles from the mainland and faces the Strait of Taiwan to the southeast. Covering an area of six square miles, the island is swathed in luxuriant green foliage. The coastline is indented with over 12 miles of the beach area. Another Buddhist temple, Nanshan Temple is located in Zhangzhou.

The Kaiyuan Temple is a Buddhist temple in West Street, Quanzhou, the largest in Fujian, with an area of 78,000 square metres (840,000 square feet). Although it is known as both a Hindu and Buddhist temple, on account of added Tamil-Hindu influences, the main statue in the most important hall is that of Vairocana Buddha, the main Buddha according to Huayan Buddhism.

In the capital of Fuzhou is the Yongquan Temple, a Buddhist temple built during the Tang dynasty.

The Chongwu Army Temple honors twenty-seven fallen soldiers of the People's Liberation Army who died during an attack by Nationalist forces in 1949, including five who died shielding a teenage girl during the attack. The site is frequented by locals and tourists.

Around Meizhou Islands is the Matsu pilgrimage.

=== Natural features ===
Mount Taimu is a mountain and a scenic resort in Fuding. It offers a grand view of mountains and sea and is famous for its natural scenery including granite caves, odd-shaped stones, cliffs, clear streams, cascading waterfalls, and cultural attractions such as ancient temples and cliff Inscriptions.

The Danxia landform in Taining was listed by the UNESCO as one of the World Heritage Sites in 2010. It is a unique type of petrographic geomorphology found in China. Danxia landform is formed from red-coloured sandstones and conglomerates of largely Cretaceous age. The landforms look very much like karst topography that forms in areas underlain by limestones, but since the rocks that form danxia are sandstones and conglomerates, they have been called "pseudo-karst" landforms. They were formed by endogenous forces (including uplift) and exogenous forces (including weathering and erosion).

The Wuyi Mountains was the first location in Fujian to be listed by UNESCO as one of the World Heritage Sites in 1999. They are a mountain range in the prefecture of Nanping and contain the highest peak in Fujian, Mount Huanggang. It is famous as a natural landscape garden and a summer resort in China.

== Notable individuals ==
The province and its diaspora abroad also have a tradition of educational achievement and have produced many important scholars, statesmen, and other notable people. These include people whose ancestral home (祖籍) is Fujian (their ancestors originated from Fujian). In addition to the below list, many notable individuals of Han Chinese descent in Taiwan, Southeast Asia, and elsewhere have ancestry that can be traced to Fujian.

Some notable individuals include (in rough chronological order):

Han, Tang, and Song dynasties

- Baizhang Huaihai (720–814), an influential master of Chan Buddhism during the Tang dynasty
- Huangbo Xiyun (died 850), an influential master of Chan Buddhism during the Tang dynasty
- Guishan Lingyou (771–853), an influential master of Chan Buddhism during the Tang dynasty
- Chen Yan (849–892), Tang dynasty governor of Fujian
- Ni Shu (?–?), a chancellor of Southern Han
- Shen Song (863–938), a chancellor of Wuyue
- Lin Ding (891–944), a chancellor of Wuyue
- Pan Chengyou (died 962), a chancellor of Min
- Zhu Wenjin (died 945), King of Min
- Liu Congxiao (906–962), Prince of Jinjiang and Jiedushi of Qingyuan Circuit
- Chen Hongjin (914–985), Jiedushi of Pinghai Circuit
- Liu Yong (984–1053), a famous poet
- Lin Deng (1003–1059), an influential Chinese Manichaeism leader during the Song dynasty
- Cai Jing (1047–1126), government official and calligrapher who lived during the Northern Song dynasty
- Li Gang (1083–1140), Song dynasty politician and military leader (ancestral home is Shaowu)
- Zhu Xi (1130–1200), Confucian philosopher
- Yuan Shu (1131–1205), Song dynasty politician and historian
- Zhen Dexiu (1178–1235), Song dynasty politician and philosopher
- Yan Yu (1191–1241), a poetry theorist and poet of the Southern Song dynasty
- Song Ci (1186–1249), Song dynasty politician and forensic medical scientist
- Chen Wenlong (1232–1277), a scholar-general in the last years of the Southern Song dynasty
- Pu Shougeng (1250–1281), a Muslim merchant and administrator in the last years of the Southern Song dynasty

Yuan, Ming, and Qing dynasties

- Chen Youding (1330–1368), Yuan dynasty military leader
- Yao Guangxiao (1335–1418), Ming dynasty military strategist
- Gao Bing (1350–1423), an author and poetry theorist during Ming dynasty
- Yang Rong (1371–1440), Ming dynasty scholar and official
- Huang Senping (14th–15th century), royal son-in-law of Sultan Muhammad Shah of Brunei
- Yan Song (1480–1565), Ming dynasty scholar and official
- Zhang Jing (1492–1555), Ming dynasty politician and general
- Yu Dayou (1503–1579), Ming dynasty general and martial artist
- Li Zhi (1527–1602), a philosopher, historian and writer
- Chen Di (1541–1617), Ming dynasty philologist, strategist, and traveler
- Ye Xianggao (1559–1627), Ming dynasty politician, calligrapher, and scholar
- Yu Xiangdou (died 1637), Ming dynasty writer and publisher
- Huang Daozhou (1585–1646), Ming dynasty politician, calligrapher, and scholar
- Ingen (1592–1673), well-known Buddhist monk, poet, and calligrapher who lived during Ming dynasty
- Hong Chengchou (1593–1665), a Ming dynasty and Qing dynasty official
- Zheng Zhilong (1604–1661), an admiral, pirate leader and politician of the late Ming dynasty
- Shi Lang (1621–1696), Qing dynasty admiral
- Li Guangdi (1642–1718), Grand Secretaries of the Qing dynasty
- Koxinga (1624–1662), Ming dynasty general who expelled the Dutch from Taiwan
- Huang Shen (1687–1772), a painter during the Qing dynasty
- Lin Zexu (1785–1850), Qing dynasty scholar and official
- Shen Baozhen (1820–1879), Qing dynasty scholar and official
- Chen Baochen (1848–1935), imperial preceptor of Qing dynasty
- Huang Naishang (1849–1924), scholar, and revolutionary, discovered the town of Sibu in Sarawak, east Malaysia in 1901
- Lin Shu (1852–1924), translator, who introduced the western classics into Chinese.
- Yan Fu (1854–1921), scholar and translator
- Sa Zhenbing (1859–1952), high-ranking naval officer of Mongolian origin
- Zheng Xiaoxu (1860–1938), Prime Minister of Manchukuo
- Lin Sen (1868–1943), Chairman of the National Government of the Republic of China
- Qiu Jin (1875–1907), revolutionary and writer
- Liang Hongzhi (1882–1946), President of the Executive Yuan of the Reformed Government of the Republic of China
- Fang Junying (1884–1923), revolutionary and educator
- Yin Ju-keng (1885–1947), Chairman of the East Hebei Autonomous Government
- Lin Juemin (1887–1911), one of 72 Revolutionary Martyrs at Huanghuagang, Guangzhou
- Chen Shaokuan (1889–1969), Fleet Admiral who served as the senior commander of naval forces of the National Revolutionary Army
- Huang Jun (1890–1937), writer
- Hsien Wu (1893–1959), protein scientist
- Lin Yutang (1894–1976), writer
- Zou Taofen (1895–1944), journalist, media entrepreneur, and political activist
- Zheng Zhenduo (1898–1958), literary historian
- Lu Yin (1899–1934), writer
- Zhu Qianzhi (1899–1972), writer

20th-21st century

- Bing Xin (1900–1999), writer
- Shu Chun Teng (1902–1970), scientist, researcher, and lecturer
- Zhang Yuzhe (1902–1986), astronomer and director of the Purple Mountain Observatory
- Hu Yepin (1903–1931), writer
- Chen Boda (1904–1989), a communist journalist, professor and political theorist
- Lin Huiyin (1904–1955), architect and writer
- Go Seigen (1914–2014), pseudonym of Go champion Wú Qīngyuán
- Lin Jiaqiao (1916－2013), a well-known mathematician
- Wang Shizhen (1916－2016), nuclear medicine physician
- Liem Sioe Liong (1916–2012), a Chinese-born Indonesian businessman of Fuqing origin, founder of Salim Group
- Zheng Min (1920–2022), a scholar and poet
- Robert Kuok (born 1923), a business magnate, investor and philanthropist based in Hong Kong
- Ray Wu (1928–2008), geneticist
- Chih-Tang Sah (born 1932), well-known electronics engineer of Mongolian origin
- Chen Jingrun (1933–1996), a widely known mathematician who invented the Chen's theorem and Chen prime
- Wang Wen-hsing (born 1939), writer
- Liu Yingming (1940–2016), a mathematician and academician
- Sun Shensu (born 1943), a geochemist and Ph.D. holder from the Columbian University (ancestral home is Fuzhou)
- Chen Zhangliang (born 1961), a Chinese biologist, elected as vice-governor of Guangxi in 2007
- Zhang Jingchu (born 1980), actress
- Lin Dan (born 1983), professional badminton player
- Zhang Yiming (born 1983), Tech entrepreneur, founder of ByteDance —the parent company of TikTok, Douyin and Seedance, richest person in Asia as of September 2026.
- Wang Xing (born 1979), Tech entrepreneur, founder of Meituan-Dianping.
- Robin Zeng (born 1968), Battery tech entrepreneur, founder of ATL (company) and Contemporary Amperex Technology Co. Limited (CATL).
- Zhang Hao (born 2000), singer

== Sports ==
Fujian includes professional sports teams in both the Chinese Basketball Association and the Chinese League One.

The representative of the province in the Chinese Basketball Association is the Fujian Sturgeons, who are based in Jinjiang, Quanzhou. The Fujian Sturgeons made their debut in the 2004–2005 season, and finished in seventh and last place in the South Division, out of the playoffs. In the 2005–2006 season, they tied for fifth, just one win away from making the playoffs.

The Xiamen Blue Lions formerly represented Fujian in the Chinese Super League, before the team's closure in 2007. Today the province is represented by Fujian Tianxin F.C., who play in the China League Two, and the Fujian Broncos.

== Education and research ==
Fujian is considered one of China's leading provinces in education and research. As of 2023, two major cities in the province ranked in the top 45 cities in the world (Xiamen 38th and Fuzhou 45th) by scientific research output, as tracked by the Nature Index.

=== Colleges and universities ===
==== National ====
- Xiamen University (founded 1921, also known as University of Amoy, "985 project", "211 project") (Xiamen)
- Huaqiao University (Quanzhou and Xiamen)

==== Provincial ====
- Fuzhou University (Fuzhou)
- Fujian Agriculture and Forestry University (Fuzhou)
- Fujian University of Traditional Chinese Medicine (Fuzhou)
- Fujian Medical University (Fuzhou)
- Fujian Normal University (Fuzhou)
- Fujian University of Technology (Fuzhou)
- Xiamen University (Xiamen)
- Jimei University (Xiamen)
- Xiamen University of Technology (Xiamen)
- Longyan University (Longyan)
- Minnan Normal University (Zhangzhou)
- Minjiang University (Fuzhou)
- Putian University (Putian)
- Quanzhou Normal University (Quanzhou)
- Sanming University (Sanming)
- Wuyi University (Wuyishan)

==== Private ====
- Yang-En University (Quanzhou)

== See also ==
- List of Major National Historical and Cultural Sites in Fujian
- Stilocapsa fujianica
