= Fujian University of Technology =

University in Fuzhou, Fujian, China

Coordinates: 26.08428°N 119.37050°E

- 福建理工大学
- Motto: 真、诚、勤、勇
- Type: Public
- Established: 2002
- Location: Fuzhou, Fujian, China
- Campus: Multiple sites, Suburban
- Website: www.fjut.edu.cn

Fujian University of Technology (Chinese: 福建理工大学) is a public university located in Fuzhou, Fujian, China. The Chinese Ministry of Education established the university in 2002 as a merger of the Fujian College of Architecture and Civil Engineering and the Fujian Institute of Technology. The predecessor of both institutions was the noted "Fujian Gaogong" (Fujian Advanced Technological School) originating from "Canxia Jingshe" (Canxia Elementary Technological School), which was co-founded in 1896 by Lin Shu, an eminent Fujian scholar and translator and Chen Baochen, tutor of the last Chinese emperor Puyi during the Qing dynasty. The university abbreviation is FJUT.

== Faculty Information ==
FJUT currently has 24,128 full-time students. There are 18,890 undergraduate students of which 5,238 are collegiates. There are also 4,788 adult students.

The university has 1,350 staff. The faculty members comprise 697 of which 213 are professors and associate professors. The university has 3 campuses, known as Shanxi Campus, Cangshan Campus and Pudong Campus and occupies a total area of 40.5 ha (607 mu). Its new location in Fuzhou University District will occupy an area of 107 ha (1,608 mu). The university is equipped with adequate facilities for teaching and learning with a total of 47 laboratories, the total value of the teaching equipment amounting to 71,420,000 Yuan.

== History ==
The timeline of the history of the university is:

Year	Organization		
1896	Fujian Cangxia Technical School		
1909	Fujian Official Intermediate Industrial School		
1933	Fuzhou Industrial Professional School of Fujian Province		
1938	Fujian Provincial Advanced Industrial School		
1952	Fujian Fuzhou Industrial School		
1953	Fujian Architectural Engineering School	Fuzhou Industrial School	
1958	Fujian Architectural Engineering Professional Training College	Fujian Mechanical and Electrical Professional Training College	
1960	Fujan Architectural Engineering College	Fujian Mechanical and Electrical College	
1963	Fujian Architectural Engineering School	Fujian Mechanical and Electrical School	
1978	Fujian Architectural Technical Institute		
1985			Fujian Zhonghua Vocational College
1994	Fujian College of Architecture and Civil Engineering		
1995		Fujian Industrial School of Technology	
2000		Fujian Polytechnic College	
2002	Fujian University of Technology		

== University Structure ==
FJUT consists of 13 departments, 2 teaching divisions, a school for adults' further education and vocational education and a software professionals training base.

- Electromechanical and Automation Department
- Information Science and Engineering Department
- Civil Engineering Department
- Architecture and Urban Planning Department
- Environment and Equipment Engineering Department
- Economic Management Department
- Modern Media Department
- Jurisprudence Department
- Mathematics and Physics Department
- School of Humanities
- Traffic and Transportation Department
- Mechanic and automobile engineering Department

The two teaching divisions are Political Science Division and Physical Education Division.
