= Stilocapsa fujianica =

Scientific classification
- Domain: Bacteria
- Kingdom: Bacillati
- Phylum: Cyanobacteriota
- Class: Cyanophyceae
- Order: Chroococcales
- Family: Chroococcaceae
- Genus: Stilocapsa
- Species: S. fujianica

Binomial name
- Stilocapsa fujianica Liang

Species of bacteria

Stilocapsa fujianica is a species of bacteria under the phylum of Cyanobacteria usually found in freshwater environments. Found in the Fujian province of China, it grows mostly on moist stony surfaces, and being autotrophic, it receives its energy from the sun.

== Description ==
The organism is microscopic, with a single, unbranched gelatinous stalk. The stalk is colorless or light orange-red, widening at the top and narrowing at the bottom. The upper diameter ranges from 5 to 9.5 μm, while the lower part measures 20 to 25 μm, with the total stalk height reaching 22.5 to 28.8 μm.
