= Mount Huanggang =

Mountain in China

- 黄岗山
- Location within China

Highest point
- Elevation: 2,158 m (7,080 ft)
- Coordinates: 27°51′35″N 117°47′00″E

Geography
- Location: China
- Parent range: Wuyi Mountains

Mount Huanggang (Chinese: 黄岗山) is the highest peak in the UNESCO designated Wuyi Mountains, China. It separates and is the highest point of both Fujian and Jiangxi provinces.

== See also ==
- List of ultras of Tibet, East Asia and neighbouring areas
