= Yuan Shu (Southern Song dynasty) =

Chinese historian and official of the Southern Song dynasty

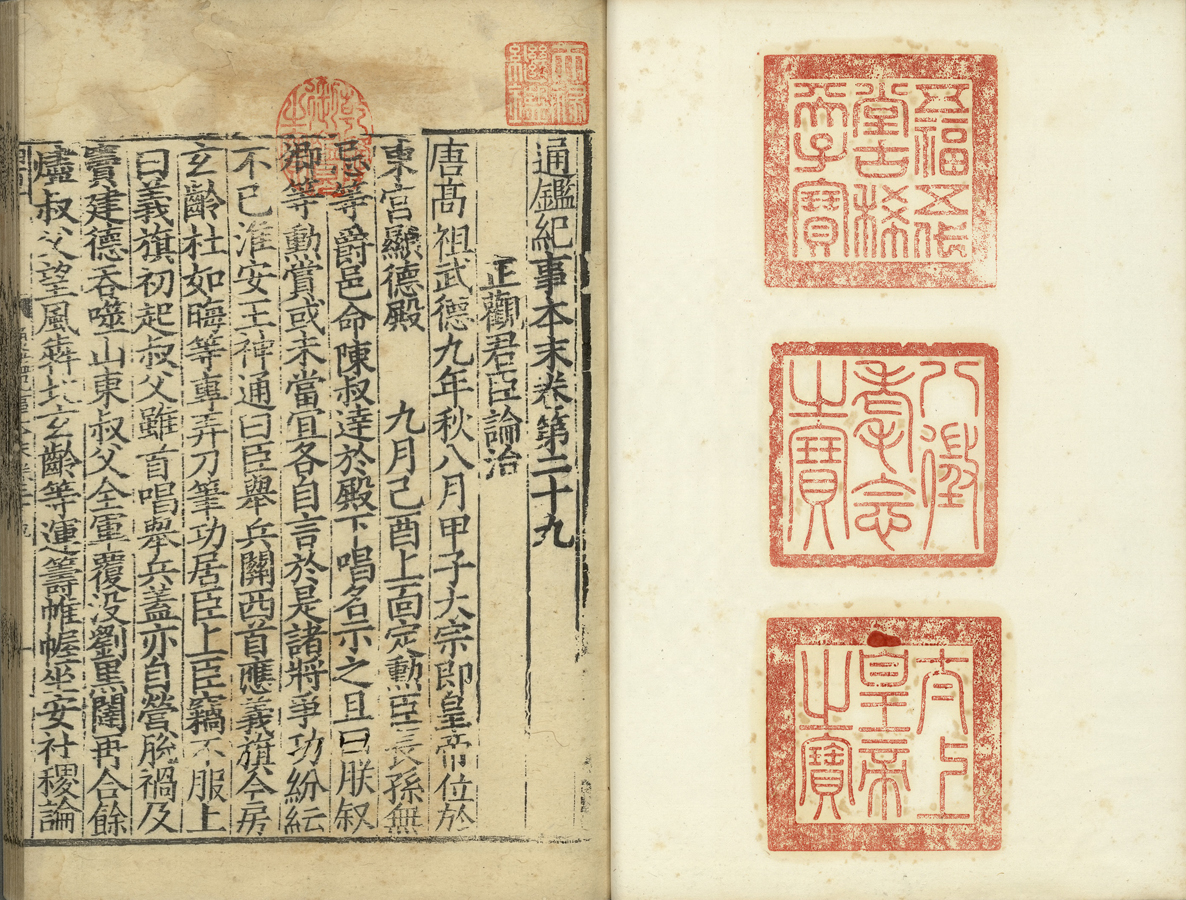
Page from an edition of the Tongjian jishi benmo 通鉴纪事本末.

Yuan Shu (simplified Chinese: 袁枢; traditional Chinese: 袁樞; pinyin: Yuán Shū; 1131–1205) was a Chinese historian and official of the Southern Song dynasty. He is best known as the author of the Tongjian jishi benmo (通鉴纪事本末/通鑑記事本末 "Historical events of the Comprehensive Mirror in their entirety"), a restructured version of the Zizhi tongjian (資治通鑑) that focuses on the sequential development of historical events. His work is contained in the collection Sibu congkan 四部丛刊 with reproduction of a large-character edition (daziben) from the Song dynasty.

== Works ==
- Tongjian jishi benmo 通鉴纪事本末/通鑑記事本末 (Sibu congkan edition)

== See also ==
- Zizhi Tongjian
- Chinese historiography
