= Fujian Provincial Committee of the Chinese Communist Party =

Fujian Provincial Committee of the Chinese Communist Party 中国共产党福建省委员会

Overview
- Type: Highest decision-making organ when Fujian Provincial Congress is not in session.
- Elected by: Fujian Provincial Congress
- Length of term: Five years
- Term limits: None
- First convocation: May 1952
- Secretary: Zhao Long
- Deputy Secretary: Guo Ningning (Acting governor); Lin Tao
- Secretary-General: Wu Xielin
- Executive organ: Standing Committee
- Inspection organ: Commission for Discipline Inspection

Fujian Provincial Committee of the Chinese Communist Party
- Simplified Chinese: 中国共产党福建省委员会
- Traditional Chinese: 中國共產黨福建省委員會
Transcriptions
Standard Mandarin
- Hanyu Pinyin: Zhōngguó Gòngchǎndǎng Fújiànshěng Wěiyuánhuì

Abbreviation
- Chinese: 中共福建省委
- Literal meaning: CCP Fujian Provincial Committee
Transcriptions
Standard Mandarin
- Hanyu Pinyin: Zhōnggòng Fújiànshěng Wěi

The Fujian Provincial Committee of the Chinese Communist Party is the provincial committee of the Chinese Communist Party (CCP) in Fujian. The CCP committee secretary is the highest ranking post in the province. The current secretary is Zhao Long, who succeeded Zhou Zuyi on 23 September 2026.

== Organization ==
The organization of the Fujian Provincial Committee includes:

- General Office

=== Functional departments ===
- Organization Department
- Publicity Department
- United Front Work Department
- Political and Legal Affairs Commission

=== Offices ===
- Policy Research Office
- Office of the Comprehensively Deepening Reforms Commission
- Office of the National Security Commission
- Office of the Cyberspace Affairs Commission
- Office of the Institutional Organization Commission
- Office of the Military-civilian Fusion Development Committee
- Taiwan, Hong Kong and Macao Affairs Office
- Letters and Calls Bureau
- Office of the Leading Group for Inspection Work
- Bureau of Veteran Cadres

=== Dispatched institutions ===
- Working Committee of the Organs Directly Affiliated to the Fujian Provincial Committee
- Non-public Enterprises and Social Organizations Working Committee
- Pingtan Comprehensive Experimental Zone Working Committee
- Fuzhou New Area Working Committee
- Quanzhou Taiwanese Investment Zone Working Committee

=== Organizations directly under the Committee ===
- Fujian Party School
- Fujian Institute of Socialism
- Fujian Daily Press Group
- Office of Party History Research and Local Chronicles Compilation
- Fujian Provincial Archives

==== Media outlets ====
In addition to the Fujian Daily newspaper, the committee controls The Strait Herald, which primarily publishes on matters concerning Taiwan. In January 2025, Taiwan's Mainland Affairs Council revoked the operating license of The Strait Herald due to its united front work on the island.

== List of party committees ==
=== Early Committee (June 1949–December 1951) ===
Committee established before and after the arrival of the Yangtze River Detachment in Fujian (June 1949–December 1951)

- Secretary: Zhang Dingcheng
- Standing Committee Members (established in March 1950): Zhang Dingcheng, Ye Fei, Fang Yi, Zeng Jingbing, Leng Chu, Chen Xinren

=== Party Representatives' Meeting (December 1951 to June 1956) ===
Committee elected by the Party Representatives' Meeting:

- Secretary: Zhang Dingcheng, Ye Fei
- First Secretary: Zhang Dingcheng, Ye Fei
- Second Secretary: Ye Fei, Jiang Yizhen
- First Deputy Secretary: Ye Fei, Fang Yi, Jiang Yizhen
- Second Deputy Secretary: Fang Yi, Wei Jinshui
- Third Deputy Secretary: Wu Hongxiang
- Deputy Secretaries: Ye Fei, Zeng Jingbing, Chen Xinren, Wei Jinshui, Wu Hongxiang, Lin Yixin, Jia Jiumin
- Standing Committee Members: Zhang Dingcheng, Ye Fei, Fang Yi, Zeng Jingbing, Leng Chu, Chen Xinren, Liu Peishan, Jiang Yizhen, Wei Jinshui, Wu Hongxiang, Lin Yixin, Jia Jiumin, Hou Zhenya, Lan Rongyu, Ye Song

=== 1st Committee (July 1956–August 1968) ===
- First Secretary: Ye Fei
- Second Secretary: Fan Shiren
- Secretariat Secretaries: Jiang Yizhen, Wei Jinshui, Wu Hongxiang, Lin Yixin, Jia Jiumin, Zhong Min, Hou Zhenya, Han Xianchu
- Alternate Secretaries: Lin Xiude, Guo Liang, Liang Lingguang, Yang Wenwei, Xu Ya
- Standing Committee Members: Ye Fei, Fan Shiren, Jiang Yizhen, Wei Jinshui, Wu Hongxiang, Lin Yixin, Jia Jiumin, Zhong Min, Hou Zhenya, Han Xianchu, Liu Peishan, Ye Song, Lan Rongyu, Lin Xiude, Guo Liang, Liang Lingguang, Xu Ya, Liu Shenzhi, Guo Shuyao, Xu Yuqing, Wang Yu, Yang Wenwei

==== Fujian Provincial Revolutionary Committee ====
The Party Core Leading Group of the Fujian Provincial Revolutionary Committee (April 1970–March 1971)

- Chairman: Han Xianchu
- Vice Chairmen: Zhou Chiping, Lan Rongyu
- Members: Zhuo Xiong, Zhu Yaohua, Huang Yaguang, Ye Song, Tan Qilong, Zhu Shaoqing, Yan Zheng

=== 2nd Committee (April 1971–October 1976) ===
- First Secretary: Han Xianchu, Liao Zhigao
- Second Secretary: Zhou Chiping
- Secretariat Secretaries: Zhu Xiong, Tan Qilong, Zhu Shaoqing, Huang Yaguang, Ni Nanshan, Ma Xingyuan, Jiang Liyin, Lin Yixin, Jin Zhaodian
- Standing Committee Members: Han Xianchu, Liao Zhigao, Zhou Chiping, Zhuo Xiong, Tan Qilong, Zhu Shaoqing, Huang Yaguang, Ni Nanshan, Jiang Liyin, Ma Xingyuan, Lin Yixin, Jin Zhaodian, Lan Rongyu, Yan Zheng, Zhu Yaohua, Ye Song, Yang Silu, Zhou Mantian, Xu Yuqing, Yuan Gai, Hu Weizhi, Chen Jiazhong, Li Zhiming, Wu Hongxiang, Liang Lingguang, Xu Ya, Wang Yu

==== Committee Reform After the Cultural Revolution (October 1976–December 1979) ====
- First Secretary: Liao Zhigao
- Secretariat Secretaries: Zhu Shaoqing, Ma Xingyuan, Jiang Liyin, Lin Yixin, Jin Zhaodian, Wu Hongxiang, Bai Zhiming, Li Zhengting, Guo Chao, Xu Ya
- Standing Committee Members: Liao Zhigao, Zhu Shaoqing, Ma Xingyuan, Jiang Liyin, Lin Yixin, Jin Zhaodian, Wu Hongxiang, Li Zhengting, Guo Chao, Xu Ya, Bai Zhiming, Li Zhiming, Lan Rongyu, Xu Yuqing, Yuan Gai, Liang Lingguang, Wang Yu, Cong Dezhi, He Ruoren, Cai Li

=== 3rd Committee (December 1979–June 1985) ===
- First Secretary: Liao Zhigao, Xiang Nan
- Standing Secretary: Xiang Nan, Hu Hong
- Secretariat Secretary: Ma Xingyuan, Jin Zhaodian, Wu Hongxiang, Li Zhengting, Guo Chao, Xu Ya, Chu Cheng, Hu Ping
- Standing Committee Members: Liao Zhigao, Xiang Nan, Hu Hong, Ma Xingyuan, Jin Zhaodian, Wu Hongxiang, Li Zhengting, Guo Chao, Xu Ya, Chu Cheng, Hu Ping, Zhu Shaoqing, Lan Rongyu, Cai Li, Cong Dezhi, Yuan Gai, He Ruoren, Wen Xiushan, Zhang Yumin, Zhang Kehui, Gao Hu, Wang Yishi, Jia Qinglin

=== 4th Committee (July 1985–October 1990) ===
- Secretary: Xiang Nan, Chen Guangyi
- Deputy Secretaries: Hu Ping, Jia Qinglin, Wang Zhaoguo
- Standing Committee Members: Xiang Nan, Chen Guangyi, Hu Ping, Wang Zhaoguo, Jia Qinglin, Yuan Qitong, Zhang Yumin, Gao Hu, Zhang Kehui, Lin Zhize, Cai Ninglin, He Shaochuan, Zhang Zongde, Lin Kaiqin, Wang Jianshuang, Zhao Xuemin, Chen Shuqing

=== 5th Committee (October 1990 – October 1995) ===
- Secretary: Chen Guangyi, Jia Qinglin
- Deputy Secretaries: Jia Qinglin, Yuan Qitong, Lin Kaiqin, Chen Mingyi, He Shaochuan
- Standing Committee Members: Chen Guangyi, Jia Qinglin, Yuan Qitong, Lin Kaiqin, Chen Mingyi, He Shaochuan, Wang Jianshuang, Zhao Xuemin, Chen Shuqing, Lin Zhaoshu, Huang Wenlin, Ren Yonggui, Xi Jinping, Shi Zhaobin, Chen Yangguan, Huang Songlu

=== 6th Committee (October 1995 - November 2001) ===
- Secretary: Jia Qinglin, Chen Mingyi
- Deputy Secretaries: Chen Mingyi, He Guoqiang, He Shaochuan, Xi Jinping, Lin Zhaoshu
- Standing Committee Members: Jia Qinglin, Chen Mingyi, He Guoqiang, He Shaochuan, Xi Jinping, Lin Zhaoshu, Zhao Xuemin, Ren Yonggui, Shi Zhaobin, Chen Yangguan, Huang Songlu, Liang Qiping, Huang Ruilin, Zhang Jiakun, Chen Mingduan

=== 7th Committee (November 2001 - November 2006) ===
- Secretary: Song Defu (- December 2004), Lu Zhangong (December 2004 - 2006)
- Deputy Secretaries: Xi Jinping, Lu Zhangong, Huang Ruilin, Liang Qiping
- Standing Committee Members: Xi Jinping, Lu Zhangong, Liang Qiping, Huang Ruilin, Chen Yingguan, Li Hong, Wu Qingtian, Huang Xiaojing, Zhu Yayan, Bao Shaokun, Jing Fusheng, He Lifeng, Zheng Lizhong.

=== 8th Committee (November 2006 - November 2011) ===
- Secretary: Lu Zhangong (November 2009), Sun Chunlan (November 2009 – 2011)
- Deputy Secretaries: Huang Xiaojing, Wang Sanyun
- Standing Committee Members: Bao Shaokun, He Lifeng, Chen Wenqing, Li Guangjin, Zhang Changping, Chen Shaoyong, Yuan Rongxiang, Tang Guozhong, Yu Weiguo, Chen Hua

=== 9th Committee (November 2011 - November 2016) ===
- Secretary: Sun Chunlan (till November 2012), You Quan (from September 2012 onwards)
- Deputy Secretaries: Su Shulin (until October 2015), Chen Wenqing (until November 2012), Yu Weiguo (from April 2013)
- Members of the Standing Committee: Sun Chunlan (-November 2012), Su Shulin (-October 2015, under investigation for serious disciplinary violations), Chen Wenqing (-November 2012), Zhu Shengling (-March 2013), Zhang Changping (-July 2013), Yuan Rongxiang (-January 2014), Yang Yue (-July 2016), Yu Weiguo, Chen Hua (-March 2015), Jiang Xinzhi (-December 2015), Ye Shuangyu (-March 2016), Su Zengtian (-January 2015), Zhang Zhinan, You Quan (-September 2012), Cao Dexin (-March 2013 -January 2015), Wang Menghui (-May 2013 -August 2016), Ni Yuefeng (-July 2013), Li Shulei (January 2014-December 2015), Chen Dong (January 2015-), Xiong Andong (January 2015-), Lei Chunmei (January 2015-), Wang Ning (December 2015-), Zheng Xiaosong (March 2016-July 2016), Gao Xiang (March 2016-), Liu Xuexin (October 2016-)

=== 10th Committee (November 2016 – November 2021) ===
- Secretary: You Quan (until 28 October 2017), Yu Weiguo (28 October 2017 – 30 November 2020), Yin Li (until 13 November 2022)
- Deputy Secretaries: Yu Weiguo (until October 2017), Ni Yuefeng (until June 2017), Tang Dengjie (December 2017–July 2020), Wang Ning (May 2018–October 2021), Hu Changsheng (September 2020–January 2021), Zhao Long (from October 2021), Luo Dongchuan (from October 2021)
- Other Standing Committee members: Zhang Zhinan (until April 2020, put under investigation), Lei Chunmei (until January 2019), Wang Ning (until October 2021), Chen Dong (until February 2017), Gao Xiang (until December 2017), Liu Xuexin (until May 2020), Pei Jinjia (until November 2018), Liang Jianyong (until March 2020), Zhou Lianqing, Wang Hongxiang (April 2017–March 2019), Hu Changsheng (July 2017–January 2021), Su Baocheng (March 2018–September 2020), Xing Shanping (from January 2019), Zheng Xincong (May 2019–July 2021), Yang Xianjin (June 2019–August 2021), Li Yangzhe (from May 2020), Zhao Long (from July 2020), Zhuang Jiahan (from July 2020), Luo Dongchuan (from July 2020), Wu Xihua (from September 2020), Lin Baojin (from September 2020), Cui Yonghui (from June 2021), Guo Ningning (from October 2021), Zhang Yan (from October 2021)

=== 11th Committee (November 2021–) ===
- Secretary: Yin Li (until 13 November 2022), Zhou Zuyi (until 23 September 2026), Zhao Long
- Deputy Secretary: Guo Ningning
- Other Standing Committee members: Zhang Yan, Li Yangzhe (until September 2022), Xing Shanping, Lin Baojin, Cui Yonghui, Guo Ningning, Wu Xielin, Song Hongxi, Wang Yongli, Liu Jianyang (until December 2022), Chi Yaoyun (from September 2022), Huang Haikun (January 2023-January 2025), Miao Yanhong (female, June 2024-), Lin Wenbin (September 2024-), Shi Haoyong (January 2025-)

== See also ==
- Politics of Fujian
  - Fujian Provincial People's Congress
  - Fujian Provincial People's Government
    - Governor of Fujian
  - Fujian Provincial Committee of the Chinese Communist Party
    - Party Secretary of Fujian
  - Fujian Provincial Committee of the Chinese People's Political Consultative Conference
- Yangtze River Detachment
