= Politics of Fujian =

The politics of Fujian Province in the People's Republic of China is structured in a dual party-government system like all other governing institutions in mainland China.

The Governor of Fujian is the highest-ranking official in the People's Government of Fujian. However, in the province's dual party-government governing system, the Governor has less power than the secretary of the Fujian Provincial Committee of the Chinese Communist Party (CCP), colloquially termed the "Fujian Party Secretary".

== Components ==
  - Fujian Provincial People's Congress (福建省人大)
  - Fujian Provincial People's Government (福建省人民政府)
    - Governor of Fujian (福建省人民政府省长)
    - Fujian Provincial Supervisory Commission (福建省监察委员会)
  - Fujian Provincial Committee of the Chinese Communist Party (中共福建省委)
    - Party Secretary of Fujian
  - Fujian Provincial Committee of the Chinese People's Political Consultative Conference (福建省政协)

== List of provincial-level leaders ==
=== CCP Party Secretaries ===
No.	Image	Name	Term start	Term end	Ref.
1		Zhang Dingcheng (1910–2000)	August 1949	October 1954	
2		Ye Fei (1914–1999)	October 1954	May 1967	
Cultural Revolution Interregnum			1967	1971	
3		Han Xianchu (1913–1986)	1971	1974	
4		Liao Zhigao (1913–2000)	1974	1980	
5		Xiang Nan (1918–1997)	1980	March 1986	
6		Chen Guangyi (born 1933)	March 1986	December 1993	
7		Jia Qinglin (born 1940)	December 1993	October 1996	
8		Chen Mingyi (born 1940)	October 1996	November 2000	
9		Song Defu (born 1946–2007)	November 2000	December 2004	
10		Lu Zhangong (born 1952)	December 2004	30 November 2009	
11		Sun Chunlan (born 1950)	30 November 2009	21 November 2012	
12		You Quan (born 1954)	19 December 2012	28 October 2017	
13		Yu Weiguo (born 1955)	28 October 2017	30 November 2020	
14		Yin Li (born 1964)	1 December 2020	13 November 2022	
15		Zhou Zuyi (born 1965)	13 November 2022	23 September 2026	
16		Zhao Long (born 1967)	23 September 2026	Incumbent	

=== Chairpersons of Fujian People's Congress ===
1. Liao Zhigao (廖志高): 1979–1982
2. Hu Hong (胡宏): 1982–1985
3. Cheng Xu (程序): 1985–1993
4. Chen Guangyi (陈光毅): 1993–1994
5. Jia Qinglin (贾庆林): 1994–1998
6. Yuan Qitong (袁启彤): 1998–2002
7. Song Defu (宋德福): 2002–2005
8. Lu Zhangong (卢展工): 2005–2010
9. Sun Chunlan (孙春兰): 2010–2013
10. You Quan (尤权): 2013–2018
11. Yu Weiguo (于伟国): 2018–2021
12. Yin Li (尹力): 2021–present

=== Governors ===
No.	Officeholder	Term of office		Political party	Ref.
No.	Officeholder	Took office	Left office	Political party	Ref.
Governor of the Fujian Provincial People's Government
1	Zhang Dingcheng (1898–1981)	17 August 1949	October 1954	Chinese Communist Party	
2	Ye Fei (1914–1999)	October 1954	February 1955	Chinese Communist Party	
Governor of the Fujian Provincial People's Committee
2	Ye Fei (1914–1999)	February 1955	January 1959	Chinese Communist Party	
3	Jiang Yizhen (1915–1994)	January 1959	October 1959	Chinese Communist Party	
–	Wu Hongxiang (1914–2005)	April 1960	June 1962	Chinese Communist Party	
3	Jiang Yizhen (1915–1994)	November 1962	December 1962	Chinese Communist Party	
4	Wei Jinshui (1906–1992)	December 1962	May 1967	Chinese Communist Party	
Director of the Fujian Revolutionary Committee
6	Han Xianchu (1913–1986)	May 1967	August 1968	Chinese Communist Party	
Director of the Fujian Provincial Military Control Committee of the People's Liberation Army
7	Han Xianchu (1913–1986)	August 1968	December 1973	Chinese Communist Party	
8	Liao Zhigao (1913–2000)	November 1974	December 1979	Chinese Communist Party	
Governor of the Fujian Provincial People's Government
9	Ma Xingyuan (1917–2005)	December 1979	January 1983	Chinese Communist Party	
10	Hu Ping (1930–2020)	January 1983	September 1987	Chinese Communist Party	
11	Wang Zhaoguo (born 1941)	September 1987	November 1990	Chinese Communist Party	
12	Jia Qinglin (born 1940)	November 1990	March 1994	Chinese Communist Party	
13	Chen Mingyi (born 1940)	March 1994	October 1996	Chinese Communist Party	
14	He Guoqiang (born 1943)	October 1996	August 1999	Chinese Communist Party	
15	Xi Jinping (born 1953)	August 1999	13 October 2002	Chinese Communist Party	
16	Lu Zhangong (born 1952)	13 October 2002	16 December 2004	Chinese Communist Party	
17	Huang Xiaojing (born 1946)	16 December 2004	11 April 2011	Chinese Communist Party	
18	Su Shulin (born 1962)	11 April 2011	3 November 2015 (Note: Suspended since 7 October 2015. Resignation accepted by Standing Committee of Fujian Provincial People's Congress on 3 November 2015)	Chinese Communist Party	
—	Vacant (Note: Executive Vice Governor Zhang Zhinan presided over government work since 7 October 2015)				
19	Yu Weiguo (born 1955)	26 November 2015	2 January 2018	Chinese Communist Party	
20	Tang Dengjie (born 1964)	2 January 2018	2 July 2020	Chinese Communist Party	
21	Wang Ning (born 1961)	2 July 2020	22 October 2021	Chinese Communist Party	
22	Zhao Long (born 1967)	22 October 2021	Incumbent	Chinese Communist Party	

=== Chairmen of Fujian CPPCC ===
1. Zeng Jingbing (曾镜冰): 1955–1956
2. Jiang Yizhen (江一真): 1956–1959
3. Ye Fei (叶飞): 1959–1964
4. Fan Shiren (范式人): 1964–1977
5. Liao Zhigao (廖志高): 1977–1979
6. Wu Hongxiang (伍洪祥): 1979–1985
7. Yuan Gai (袁改): 1985–1988
8. Chen Guangyi (陈光毅): 1988–1993
9. You Dexin (游德馨): 1993–2003
10. Chen Mingyi (陈明义): 2003–2008
11. Liang Qiping (梁绮萍): 2008–2013
12. Zhang Changping (张昌平): 2013–2018
13. Cui Yuying (崔玉英): 2018–present

== See also ==
- Fujian Provincial Government, the Republic of China's former parallel administration for its Fujian Province.
