= Governor of Fujian =

List of governors of the Chinese province

Governor of the Fujian Provincial People's Government
- 福建省人民政府省长
- National Emblem of China

- Flag of China
- Incumbent; Guo Ningning; Acting since 4 November 2026
- Fujian Provincial People's Government
- Type: Governor
- Status: Provincial and ministerial-level official
- Reports to: Fujian Provincial People's Congress and its Standing Committee
- Nominator: Presidium of the Fujian Provincial People's Congress
- Appointer: Fujian Provincial People's Congress
- Term length: Five years, renewable
- Inaugural holder: Zhang Dingcheng
- Formation: 17 August 1949
- Deputy: Deputy Governors; Secretary-General

The governor of Fujian, officially the Governor of the Fujian Provincial People's Government, is the head of Fujian Province and leader of the Fujian Provincial People's Government.

The governor is elected by the Fujian Provincial People's Congress, and responsible to it and its Standing Committee. The governor is a provincial level official and is responsible for the overall decision-making of the provincial government. The governor is assisted by an executive vice governor as well as several vice governors. The governor traditionally serves as the deputy secretary of the Fujian Provincial Committee of the Chinese Communist Party and as a member of the CCP Central Committee. The governor is the second highest-ranking official in the province after the secretary of the CCP Fujian Committee. The current acting governor is Guo Ningning, who took office on 4 November 2026.

== List of governors ==
=== Republic of China ===
Chairperson of the Fujian Provincial Government
No.	Portrait	Name (Birth–Death)	Term of Office		Political Party
1		Yang Shu-chuang 楊樹莊; Yáng Shùzhuāng (1882–1934)	1 May 1927	7 December 1932	Kuomintang
1		Yang Shu-chuang 楊樹莊; Yáng Shùzhuāng (1882–1934)	Concurrently held position as Minister of the Navy.		
—		Chen Nai-yuan 陳乃元; Chén Nǎiyuán (1878–1930)	5 February 1929	6 January 1930	Kuomintang
—		Chen Nai-yuan 陳乃元; Chén Nǎiyuán (1878–1930)	As acting; head of Provincial Civil Affairs Department.		
—		Fang Sheng-tao 方聲濤; Fāng Shēngtāo (1885–1934)	6 January 1930	7 December 1932	Kuomintang
—		Fang Sheng-tao 方聲濤; Fāng Shēngtāo (1885–1934)	As acting; head of Provincial Public Security Department.		
2		Chiang Kuang-nai 蔣光鼐; Jiǎng Guāngnài (1888–1967)	7 December 1932	20 December 1933	Kuomintang
3		Chen Yi 陳儀; Chén Yí (1883–1950)	12 January 1934	28 August 1941	Kuomintang
3		Chen Yi 陳儀; Chén Yí (1883–1950)	Provincial government relocated to Yong'an County from 1938 after Japan instituted a sea blockade and the Second Sino-Japanese War.		
4		Liu Chien-hsü 劉建緒; Liú Jiànxù (1892–1978)	28 August 1941	16 September 1948	Kuomintang
4		Liu Chien-hsü 劉建緒; Liú Jiànxù (1892–1978)	Government relocated back to Fuzhou in 1945.		
5		Li Liang-jung 李良榮; Lǐ Liángróng (1906–1967)	16 September 1948	20 January 1949	Kuomintang
6		Chu Shao-liang 朱紹良; Zhū Shàoliáng (1891–1963)	20 January 1949	4 October 1949	Kuomintang

=== People's Republic of China ===
No.	Officeholder	Term of office		Political party	Ref.
No.	Officeholder	Took office	Left office	Political party	Ref.
Governor of the Fujian Provincial People's Government
1	Zhang Dingcheng (1898–1981)	17 August 1949	October 1954	Chinese Communist Party	
2	Ye Fei (1914–1999)	October 1954	February 1955	Chinese Communist Party	
Governor of the Fujian Provincial People's Committee
2	Ye Fei (1914–1999)	February 1955	January 1959	Chinese Communist Party	
3	Jiang Yizhen (1915–1994)	January 1959	October 1959	Chinese Communist Party	
–	Wu Hongxiang (1914–2005)	April 1960	June 1962	Chinese Communist Party	
3	Jiang Yizhen (1915–1994)	November 1962	December 1962	Chinese Communist Party	
4	Wei Jinshui (1906–1992)	December 1962	May 1967	Chinese Communist Party	
Director of the Fujian Revolutionary Committee
6	Han Xianchu (1913–1986)	May 1967	August 1968	Chinese Communist Party	
Director of the Fujian Provincial Military Control Committee of the People's Liberation Army
7	Han Xianchu (1913–1986)	August 1968	December 1973	Chinese Communist Party	
8	Liao Zhigao (1913–2000)	November 1974	December 1979	Chinese Communist Party	
Governor of the Fujian Provincial People's Government
9	Ma Xingyuan (1917–2005)	December 1979	January 1983	Chinese Communist Party	
10	Hu Ping (1930–2020)	January 1983	September 1987	Chinese Communist Party	
11	Wang Zhaoguo (born 1941)	September 1987	November 1990	Chinese Communist Party	
12	Jia Qinglin (born 1940)	November 1990	March 1994	Chinese Communist Party	
13	Chen Mingyi (born 1940)	March 1994	October 1996	Chinese Communist Party	
14	He Guoqiang (born 1943)	October 1996	August 1999	Chinese Communist Party	
15	Xi Jinping (born 1953)	August 1999	13 October 2002	Chinese Communist Party	
16	Lu Zhangong (born 1952)	13 October 2002	16 December 2004	Chinese Communist Party	
17	Huang Xiaojing (born 1946)	16 December 2004	11 April 2011	Chinese Communist Party	
18	Su Shulin (born 1962)	11 April 2011	3 November 2015 (Note: Suspended since 7 October 2015. Resignation accepted by Standing Committee of Fujian Provincial People's Congress on 3 November 2015)	Chinese Communist Party	
—	Vacant (Note: Executive Vice Governor Zhang Zhinan presided over government work since 7 October 2015)				
19	Yu Weiguo (born 1955)	26 November 2015	2 January 2018	Chinese Communist Party	
20	Tang Dengjie (born 1964)	2 January 2018	2 July 2020	Chinese Communist Party	
21	Wang Ning (born 1961)	2 July 2020	22 October 2021	Chinese Communist Party	
22	Zhao Long (born 1967)	22 October 2021	4 November 2026	Chinese Communist Party	
23	Guo Ningning (born 1970)	4 November 2026	Incumbent	Chinese Communist Party	

== See also ==
- Politics of Fujian
  - Fujian Provincial People's Congress
  - Fujian Provincial People's Government
    - Governor of Fujian
  - Fujian Provincial Committee of the Chinese Communist Party
    - Party Secretary of Fujian
  - Fujian Provincial Committee of the Chinese People's Political Consultative Conference
