= Party Secretary of Fujian =

Provincial government position in China

Secretary of the Fujian Provincial Committee of the Chinese Communist Party
- 中国共产党福建省委员会书记
- Emblem of the Chinese Communist Party

- Flag of the Chinese Communist Party

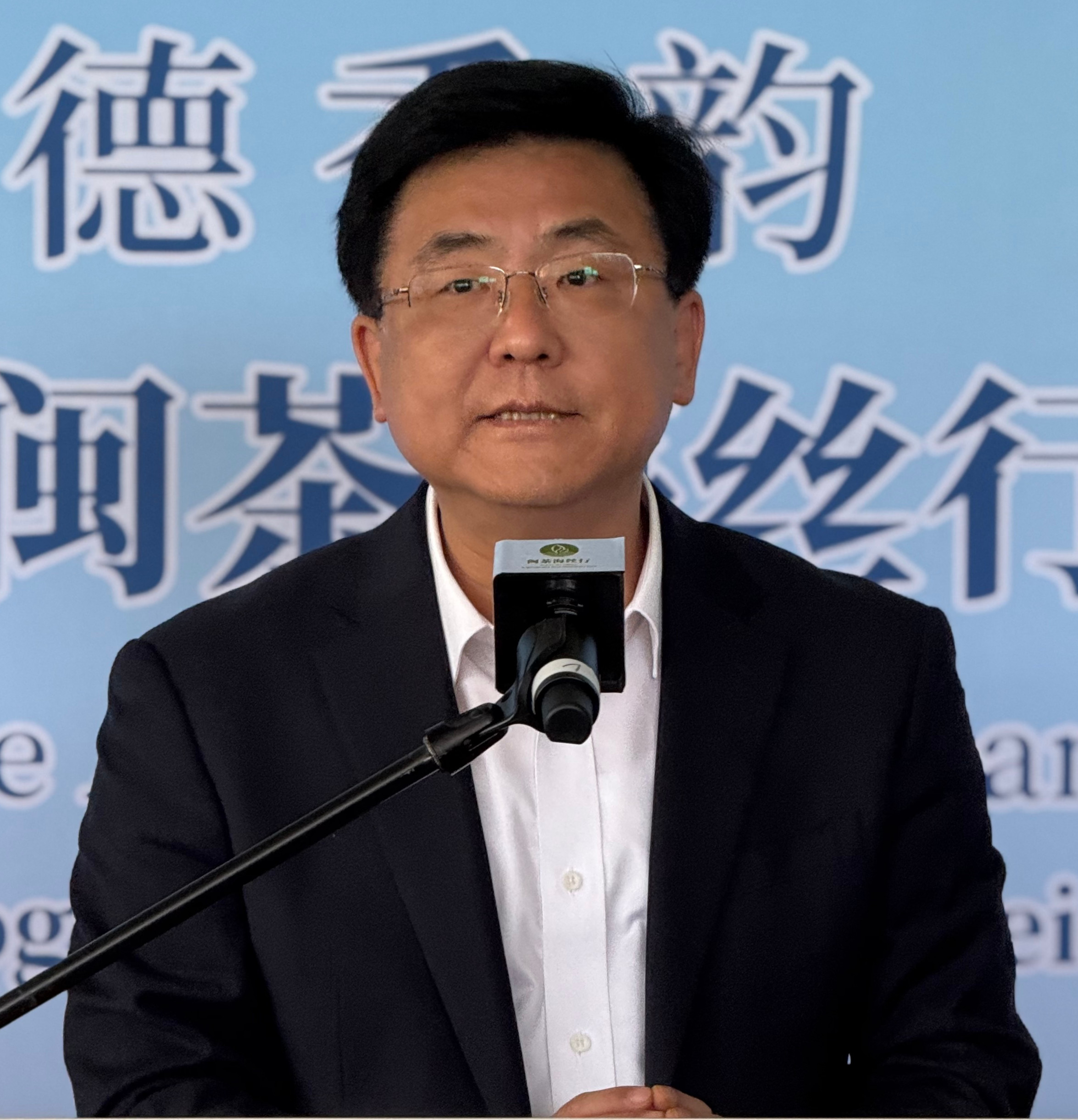
- Incumbent; Zhao Long since 23 September 2026
- Fujian Provincial Committee of the Chinese Communist Party
- Type: Party Committee Secretary
- Status: Provincial and ministerial-level official
- Member of: Fujian Provincial Standing Committee
- Nominator: Central Committee
- Appointer: Fujian Provincial Committee Central Committee
- Inaugural holder: Zhang Dingcheng
- Formation: August 1949
- Deputy: Deputy Secretary; Secretary-General

The secretary of the Fujian Provincial Committee of the Chinese Communist Party is the leader of the Fujian Provincial Committee of the Chinese Communist Party (CCP). As the CCP is the sole ruling party of the People's Republic of China (PRC), the secretary is the highest ranking post in Fujian.

The secretary is officially appointed by the CCP Central Committee based on the recommendation of the CCP Organization Department, which is then approved by the Politburo and its Standing Committee. The secretary can be also appointed by a plenary meeting of the Fujian Provincial Committee, but the candidate must be the same as the one approved by the central government. The secretary leads the Standing Committee of the Fujian Provincial Committee, and is usually a member of the CCP Central Committee. The secretary leads the work of the Provincial Committee and its Standing Committee. The secretary outranks the governor, who is generally the deputy secretary of the committee.

The current secretary is Zhao Long, who took office on 23 September 2026.

== List of party secretaries ==
No.	Image	Name	Term start	Term end	Ref.
1		Zhang Dingcheng (1910–2000)	August 1949	October 1954	
2		Ye Fei (1914–1999)	October 1954	May 1967	
Cultural Revolution Interregnum			1967	1971	
3		Han Xianchu (1913–1986)	1971	1974	
4		Liao Zhigao (1913–2000)	1974	1980	
5		Xiang Nan (1918–1997)	1980	March 1986	
6		Chen Guangyi (born 1933)	March 1986	December 1993	
7		Jia Qinglin (born 1940)	December 1993	October 1996	
8		Chen Mingyi (born 1940)	October 1996	November 2000	
9		Song Defu (born 1946–2007)	November 2000	December 2004	
10		Lu Zhangong (born 1952)	December 2004	30 November 2009	
11		Sun Chunlan (born 1950)	30 November 2009	21 November 2012	
12		You Quan (born 1954)	19 December 2012	28 October 2017	
13		Yu Weiguo (born 1955)	28 October 2017	30 November 2020	
14		Yin Li (born 1964)	1 December 2020	13 November 2022	
15		Zhou Zuyi (born 1965)	13 November 2022	23 September 2026	
16		Zhao Long (born 1967)	23 September 2026	Incumbent	

== See also ==
- Politics of Fujian
  - Fujian Provincial People's Congress
  - Fujian Provincial People's Government
    - Governor of Fujian
  - Fujian Provincial Committee of the Chinese Communist Party
    - Party Secretary of Fujian
  - Fujian Provincial Committee of the Chinese People's Political Consultative Conference
