= Wang Changping =

Chinese mathematician

Wang Changping (born January 1963) is a Chinese mathematician and the president of Fujian Normal University. A native of Fuzhou, Fujian, he is a distinguished professor under the seventh batch of the "Changjiang Scholars Program" of the Ministry of Education of China and a recipient of the National Outstanding Young Scientist Fund of China.

== Biography ==
Wang studied at the Department of Mathematics at Peking University and the Technische Universität Berlin. In 1997, he returned to China to teach at the School of Mathematical Sciences at Peking University, where he served as dean starting in 2008.

In October 2012, he returned to his hometown of Fuzhou and was appointed vice president of Fujian Normal University. In January 2014, he took on the role of overseeing the administrative work of Fujian Normal University. In May 2015, he was officially appointed president of Fujian Normal University. In June 2022, he was elected chairman of the Fujian Provincial Committee of the Jiusan Society.
