= Guo Ningning =

Chinese politician and banker

- 郭宁宁

Governor of Fujian
- Acting
- Assumed office 4 November 2026
- Party Secretary: Zhao Long
- Preceded by: Zhao Long

Communist Party Secretary of Fuzhou
- In office 6 May 2024 – 24 October 2026
- Deputy: Wu Xiande (mayor)
- Preceded by: Lin Baojin
- Succeeded by: Qin Haixiang

Executive Vice-Governor of Fujian
- In office October 2021 – May 2024
- Governor: Tang Dengjie; Wang Ning; Zhao Long
- Preceded by: Zheng Xincong
- Succeeded by: Wang Yongli

Vice-President of the Agricultural Bank of China
- In office June 2016 – October 2018
- President: Zhao Huan

Personal details
- Born: July 1970 (age 56) Shenyang, Liaoning, China
- Party: Chinese Communist Party
- Education: Tsinghua University

Chinese name
- Traditional Chinese: 郭寧寧
- Simplified Chinese: 郭宁宁
Transcriptions
Standard Mandarin
- Hanyu Pinyin: Guō Níngníng

Guo Ningning (Chinese: 郭宁宁; born July 1970) is a Chinese female politician and banker currently serving as the acting governor of Fujian, and previously as communist party secretary of Fuzhou and vice-governor of Fujian. Guo has been tipped as a rising star in the "7th Generation" of the Chinese Communist Party (CCP).

== Biography ==
Guo was born in July 1970 in Shenyang, Liaoning, and graduated from the Tsinghua University School of Economics and Management.

After university, she served in several posts in the Bank of China before serving as vice-president of the Agricultural Bank of China in June 2016. She is the first female vice-president of the Agricultural Bank of China since it was established in 1951.

In October 2018, she was transferred to Fuzhou, capital of southeast China's Fujian province, where she became a member of the CCP's Fujian Provincial Committee. On 23 November 2018, Guo was appointed vice-governor of Fujian at the Seventh Meeting of the 13th Standing Committee of the People's Congress of Fujian. She became the youngest female provincial-ranked level official in mainland China.

In 2020, Guo participated in an online campaign to promote Fujian's seafood and ate an eel on a livestream that got more than one million views.

In October 2021, Guo was elevated to executive vice-governor of Fujian and was admitted to member of the CCP Fujian Provincial Committee, the province's top authority. On 6 May 2024, she succeeded Lin Baojin as party secretary of Fuzhou, capital of Fujian province. On 23 May 2025, she was appointed deputy party secretary of Fujian.

In November 2026, Guo was appointed as the acting governor of Fujian.

== Recognition ==
In 2021, she was included in the Time 100 Next list.

Government offices
Preceded by Zheng Xincong	Executive Vice-Governor of Fujian; 2021–2024	Succeeded by Wang Yongli
Preceded by Zhao Long	Governor of Fujian; 2026–	Incumbent
Party political offices
Preceded by Luo Dongchuan	Specifically-designated Deputy Communist Party Secretary of Fujian; 2025–2026	Succeeded by Lin Tao
Preceded by Lin Baojin	Communist Party Secretary of Fuzhou; 2024–2026	Succeeded by Qin Haixiang
