= Fujian Provincial Archives =

Fujian Provincial Archives (Chinese: 福建省档案馆), or Archives of Fujian Province is an archive in Fujian, China. It was established in October 1959 and became accessible to the public in July 1960. It is managed by the Fujian Provincial Committee of the Chinese Communist Party and the Fujian Provincial People's Government. By 1985, it had 201 fonds and more than 275,800 volumes.
