= Hou Zhenya =

Chinese politician

- 侯振亚
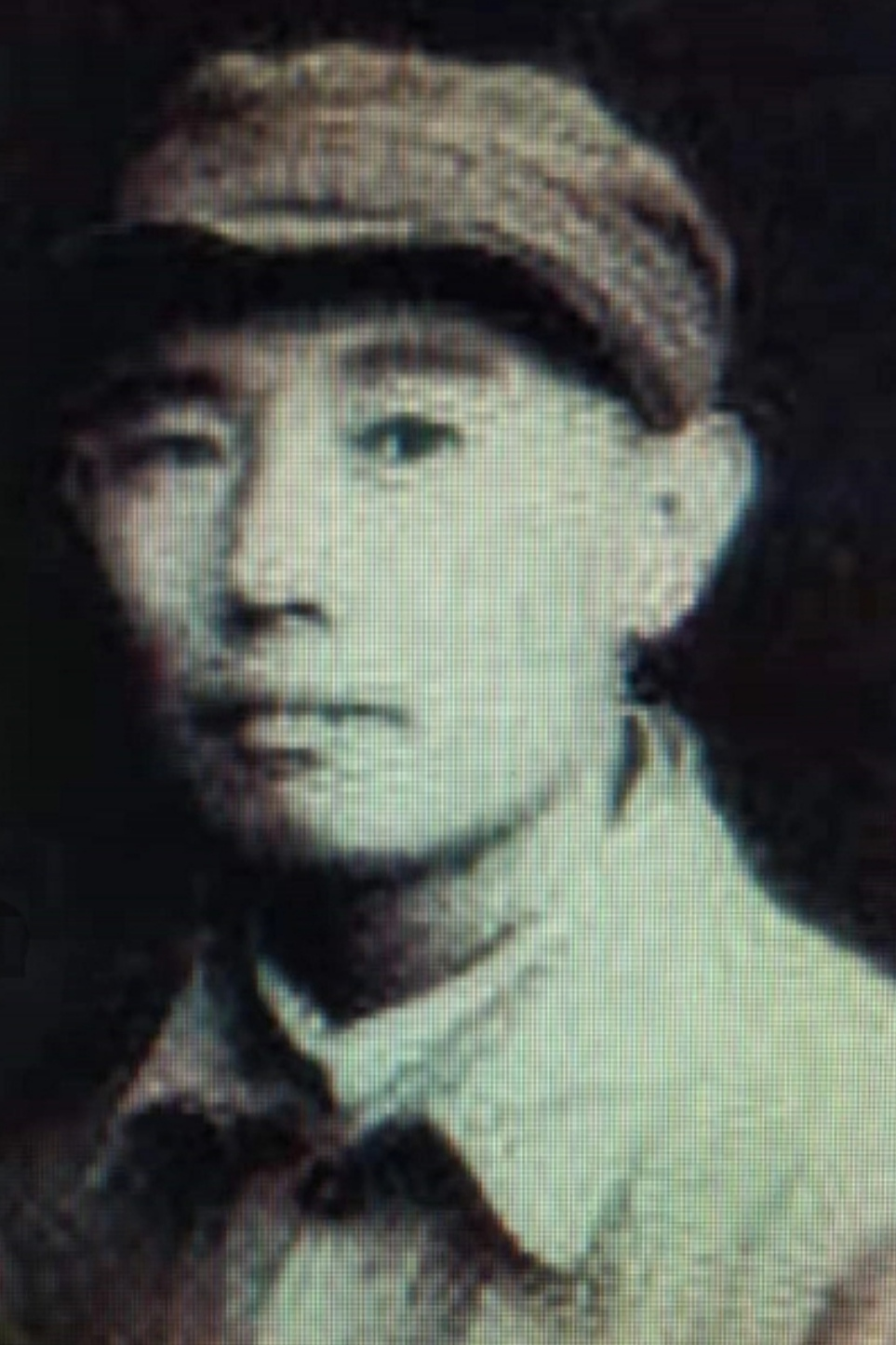
- Born: December 31, 1912; Republic of China
- Died: August 22, 1974 (aged 61); China
- Resting place: China
- Political party: Chinese Communist Party

Hou Zhenya (December 31, 1912 – August 22, 1974), born Hou Zhengyin, was a political figure of the People's Republic of China from Shahe, Hebei Province.

== Life ==
=== Early years ===
Hou Zhenya was born into a middle-peasant family in Shahe, Hebei. He lost his mother at the age of five, and the family relied on his father, Hou Zhaorong, who made a living through farming.

In 1925, Hou Zhenya graduated from primary school and attended Jinyou Middle School in Pingding County, Shanxi Province. Influenced by a teacher at Daming Seventh Normal School who was a member of the Chinese Communist Party (CCP), Hou Zhenya was admitted to Daming Seventh Normal School in 1929. In the fall of the same year, he joined the Communist Youth League of China. By September 1930, he became a member of the CCP and participated in the Anti-Imperialist League and the League of Left-Wing Writers.

=== After joining the CCP ===
After joining the CCP, Hou Zhenya served as the propaganda committee member of the CCP branch at Daming Seventh Normal School and as the secretary of the county committee. During the summer vacation of 1931, under the instructions of the CCP Southern Hebei Special Committee, he returned to his hometown in Shahe County with his companion Zhou Xiang to establish a party branch, appointing himself as secretary. In September 1932, on the first anniversary of the "September 18th Incident," Hou Zhenya was arrested by the Nationalist Government at Daming Seventh Normal School and taken to Shunde Prefecture (modern-day Xingtai) Prison. He was later transferred to Caolanzi Prison in Beiping (now Beijing).

Hou Zhenya underwent three interrogations while in prison. According to the system of the Reformation Institute, he could be released immediately regardless of the sentence if he pressed his fingerprint on an anti-communist declaration during the interrogations. However, even though the prison repeatedly used torture to extract a confession, Hou Zhenya did not accept the condition.

In late 1934, as prison food conditions worsened, the CCP branch within the prison declared a hunger strike. After seven days, under pressure from the political prisoners, the prison authorities agreed to improve the food conditions.

=== The Anti-Japanese Period ===
In 1936, due to a shortage of personnel for the Anti-Japanese movement, the North China Bureau of the CCP requested instructions from the Central Committee of the CCP twice. After receiving approval, they instructed imprisoned members in Beiping to follow the Reformation Institute's procedures to secure their release. Hou Zhenya, along with An Ziwen and others, signed an anti-communist declaration and was released from prison. Subsequently, through An Ziwen's introduction, he traveled to Taiyuan to connect with Bo Yibo, joined the Shanxi National Salvation Association, and served as a propaganda committee member.

In September 1937, Hou Zhenya was assigned to Zuoquan County as the county party secretary. In 1941, he was appointed deputy secretary of the Qinyuan County Party Committee and was later promoted to full secretary. Starting in 1942, he participated in the Qinyuan Siege, which lasted over 900 days.

After the end of the Second Sino-Japanese War, from 1946 to 1949, Hou Zhenya served as the deputy director of the Organization Department of the CCP Taiyue District Committee in Shanxi, concurrently holding the position of head of the Cadre Division. In March 1949, he was appointed deputy director of the Organization Department of the Yangtze River Task Force of the Chinese People's Liberation Army and marched south with the Yangtze River Detachment to Fujian.

=== The People's Republic of China Era ===
After arriving in Fujian, Hou Zhenya served as the deputy director of the Organization Department of the Fujian Provincial Committee of the Chinese Communist Party and concurrently as the director of the Personnel Department. In 1954, he was elected as a representative to the First National People's Congress and later served as a representative to the Second and Third National People's Congresses.

In 1966, at the onset of the Cultural Revolution, Kang Sheng and others began investigating the events of 1936, fabricating the "61 Renegades" to target Liu Shaoqi (who, at the time, had submitted a report on behalf of the North China Bureau to the CCP Central Committee requesting the release of the 61 individuals). Hou Zhenya was subsequently overthrown and imprisoned, where he was persecuted to death in 1974.

== Rehabilitation ==
At the end of the Cultural Revolution, Hua Guofeng, Mao Zedong's designated successor, along with Wang Dongxing and others, refused to rehabilitate the "61 Traitors Group Case." It was not until after the Third Plenary Session of the 11th Central Committee in 1978 that the case was fully rectified. Hou Zhenya was subsequently reburied in the Revolutionary Cemetery at Zhenfeng Mountain in Fuzhou.

In 2012, on the centenary of Hou Zhenya's birth, his ashes were transported back to his hometown, Beizu Village in Shahe City.

== Family ==
Hou Zhenya's father, Hou Zhaorong, was a farmer. Hou Zhenya had one son, Hou Zhanglin, and one daughter, Gao Ronglin. His cousin was Hou Zhengshun.
