= Liu Yandong =

Chinese politician (1945–2026)

- 刘延东
- Liu in 2016

Vice Premier of China
- In office March 16, 2013 – March 19, 2018 Serving with Zhang Gaoli, Wang Yang, Ma Kai
- Premier: Li Keqiang

State Councilor of China
- In office March 17, 2008 – March 16, 2013 Serving with Liang Guanglie, Ma Kai, Meng Jianzhu, Dai Bingguo
- Premier: Wen Jiabao

Head of the United Front Work Department
- In office December 5, 2002 – December 2, 2007
- General Secretary: Hu Jintao
- Preceded by: Wang Zhaoguo
- Succeeded by: Du Qinglin

Personal details
- Born: November 22, 1945 Nantong County, Jiangsu, Republic of China
- Died: October 28, 2026 (aged 80) Beijing, China
- Party: Chinese Communist Party
- Education: Tsinghua University
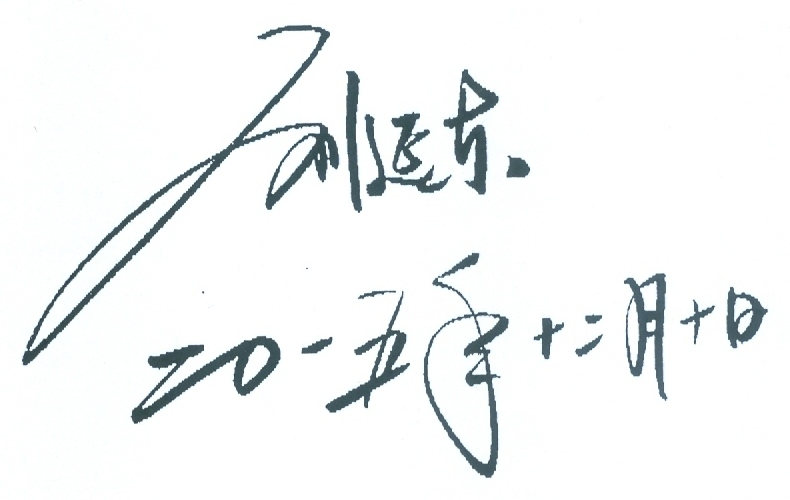
- Signature

Liu Yandong
- Simplified Chinese: 刘延东
- Traditional Chinese: 劉延東
Transcriptions
Standard Mandarin
- Hanyu Pinyin: Liú Yándōng

Liu Yandong (Chinese: 刘延东; November 22, 1945 – October 28, 2026) was a Chinese politician. She served as a vice premier of the PRC from 2013 to 2018, and was a member of the Politburo of the Chinese Communist Party from 2007 to 2017, a State Councilor between 2007 and 2012, and was head of the United Front Work Department of the Communist Party between 2002 and 2007.

Liu was a graduate of Tsinghua University, and was associated throughout her career with her fellow alumnus and Communist Youth League colleague Hu Jintao. As such Chinese-language media has sometimes labelled Liu as part of the so-called "Tuanpai", or "Youth League clique". After the retirement of Vice Premier Wu Yi, Liu became the highest-ranked female political figure in China, and one of only three women to have held a seat on the Politburo since 1987, the others being Wu and retired Vice Premier Sun Chunlan. (Note: Prior to 1987, female Politburo members, such as Ye Qun, Deng Yingchao, and Jiang Qing, were invariably wives of party leaders.)

== Early life and education ==
Liu was born on November 22, 1945 in Nantong County, Jiangsu. Her father, Liu Ruilong, was a communist organiser who served as party secretary of Nantong County in the late 1920s, and he later became a vice-minister of agriculture. Because of her father's revolutionary background, some analysts have classified her as a princeling.

She joined the Chinese Communist Party in July 1964. From 1964 to 1970, she studied in the Department of Engineering Chemistry at Tsinghua University, where she also served as a political counsellor for her year group. While working, she later earned a master's degree in sociology from Renmin University of China, from 1990 to 1994, and a doctorate in law, in political theory, from the School of Administration of Jilin University, from 1994 to 1998.

== Early career ==
After graduating, Liu began work in March 1970 at the Kaiping Chemical Plant in Tangshan, Hebei, where she rose from worker to technician and head of a polysilicon workshop. From 1972 to 1980, she worked at the Beijing Chemical Experimental Plant, where she held posts including head of the political department and, from 1978, deputy party secretary. In 1980, she moved to the organisation department of the Beijing Municipal Party Committee, and from 1981 to 1982, she was deputy party secretary of Chaoyang District.

From 1982 to 1991, Liu was a secretary and later executive secretary of the Secretariat of the Communist Youth League Central Committee, and she was successively vice-chair and chair of the All-China Youth Federation. In the Youth League, she worked as a deputy to Hu Jintao, who, like her, was a Tsinghua graduate. She was also a member of the Standing Committee of the 7th National People's Congress.

== United Front Work Department ==
In 1991, Liu joined the United Front Work Department as deputy secretary-general and then deputy head, while remaining chair of the All-China Youth Federation until 1995. From 1995, she was also party secretary of the Central Institute of Socialism, and in 2001, she was given full ministerial rank. In 2002, she became head of the department, a post she held until 2007. In 2003, she was also elected a vice-chair of the 10th National Committee of the Chinese People's Political Consultative Conference.

== Politburo and State Council ==
=== State councilor ===
Liu at the Palacio de Carondelet in Ecuador (2010)

At the 17th Party Congress in 2007, Liu was elected to the Politburo. In March 2008, she became a state councilor and a member of the party group of the State Council, and she was also a vice-president of the Beijing Organizing Committee for the Olympic Games. In 2008, she received the Olympic Order in silver and the Paralympic Order. In 2009, Stony Brook University awarded her an honorary doctorate, and New York state senator Toby Ann Stavisky who attended the ceremony described her as the highest-ranking woman in the Chinese government. By 2012, she was the only woman on the 25-member Politburo, and she was regarded as a long-shot candidate to become the first woman on its Standing Committee.

=== Vice premier ===
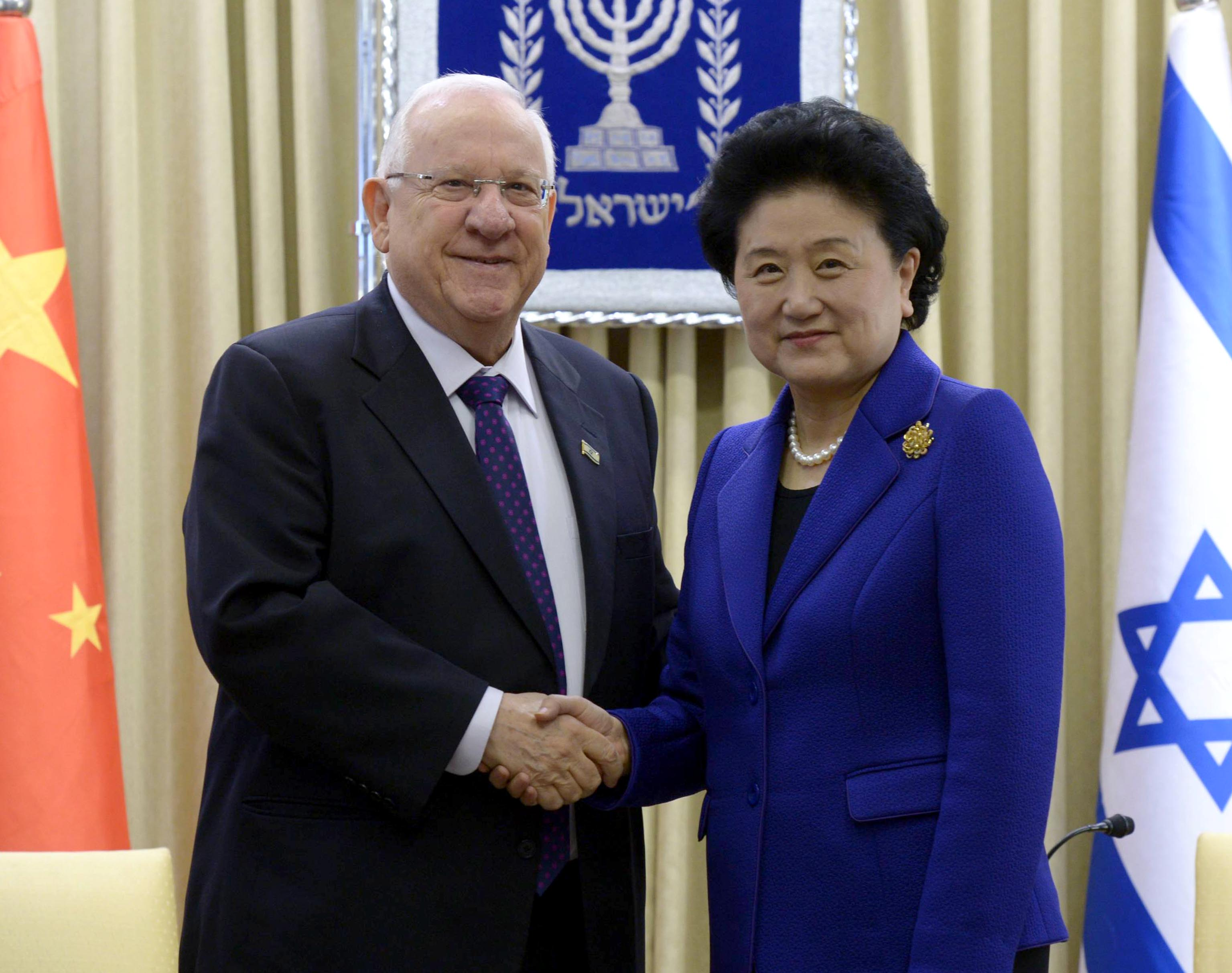
Liu with the President of Israel, Reuven Rivlin, in March 2016

At the 18th Party Congress in November 2012, Liu was re-elected to the Politburo, which for the first time since the Cultural Revolution had two female members, her and Sun Chunlan. In March 2013, she was appointed vice premier in the government of Li Keqiang. She was responsible for education, health, culture and sport, and she chaired the Academic Degrees Committee of the State Council.

On 5 December 2017, while serving as Vice Premier of China, Liu Yandong received an honorary Doctor of Letters degree from the University of Edinburgh at a ceremony in St Cecilia's Hall. The university recognised her work in promoting Chinese-language education and cultural exchange with China.

In February 2018, she attended the closing ceremony of the 2018 Winter Olympics in Pyeongchang, South Korea as the envoy of Chinese leader Xi Jinping, when the Games were handed over to Beijing as host of the 2022 Winter Olympics. In May 2017, she was awarded the Russian Order of Friendship in recognition of her significant contribution to 'strengthening cooperation with the Russian Federation.'

Liu retired from the Politburo at the 19th Party Congress in October 2017, leaving Sun Chunlan as its only female member. Her term as vice premier ended on March 19, 2018, when the National People's Congress endorsed Han Zheng, Sun Chunlan, Hu Chunhua and Liu He as vice premiers.

== Personal life and death ==
Liu was married for more than 40 years to Yang Yuanxing, who ran his own technology company, and the couple had one daughter. Liu died in Beijing on October 28, 2026, at the age of 80.

== See also ==
- Tsinghua clique

Party political offices
Preceded by Wang Zhaoguo	Head of the United Front Work Department; 2002–2007	Succeeded by Du Qinglin
