= Zhang Dingcheng =

Chinese politician (1898–1981)

- 张鼎丞
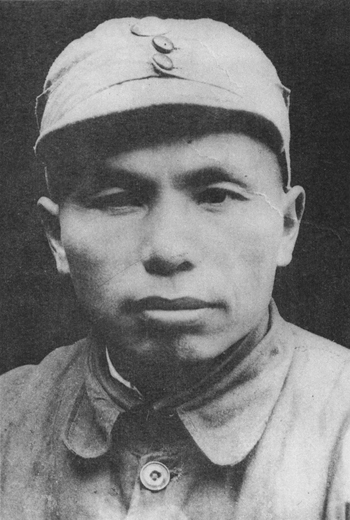
- Zhang in the New Fourth Army

Procurator-General of the Supreme People's Procuratorate
- In office 27 September 1954 – 17 January 1975
- Chairman: Mao Zedong
- Preceded by: Luo Ronghuan
- Succeeded by: Huang Huoqing

Party Secretary of Fujian
- In office August 1949 – October 1954
- Preceded by: Office established
- Succeeded by: Ye Fei

Governor of Fujian
- In office August 1949 – October 1954
- Preceded by: Zhu Shaoliang
- Succeeded by: Ye Fei

Personal details
- Born: December 1898 Yongding County, Fujian, Qing Empire
- Died: December 16, 1981 (aged 83) Beijing, China
- Party: Chinese Communist Party

Military service
- Allegiance: Chinese Communist Party; China
- Branch/service: People's Liberation Army
- Years of service: 1928–1954
- Battles/wars: Long March, 2nd Sino-Japanese War, Chinese Civil War

Zhang Dingcheng (simplified Chinese: 张鼎丞; traditional Chinese: 張鼎丞; pinyin: Zhāng Dǐngchéng; Pe̍h-ōe-jī: TiuⁿTiaⁿ-seng; December 1898 – December 16, 1981) was a military leader, revolutionary and politician of the People's Republic of China, Procurator–General of the Supreme People's Procuratorate from 1954 to 1975. His tenure remains the longest in the history of the Supreme Procuratorate.

== Biography ==
Zhang Dingcheng was born in Yongding County, Fujian in 1898. He graduated as a schoolteacher from the teachers college of Dapu County, Guangdong, and taught at primary schools. While teaching at the Qingxi Baoxu Temple primary school in Dapu County, he discovered Marxism, participated in revolutionary activities and joined the Chinese Communist Party (CCP) in 1927.

He commanded units of the Chinese Red Army (predecessor of the People's Liberation Army), studied at the CCP Central Party School and took part in the Long March, accompanying Mao to Yan'an. Zhang fought in both the Second Sino-Japanese War and, after the Japanese surrender, the Chinese Civil War that resulted in a CCP victory and the establishment of the People's Republic of China.

From 1949 to 1954, Zhang served as Governor and CCP Committee Secretary of Fujian Province. In 1954, he became Procurator–General of the Supreme People's Procuratorate, holding that post for a record 21 years. During the Cultural Revolution, he was publicly denounced by some Red Guard groups, but his loyalty to Mao ensured that he remained in his place. Nevertheless, the 1975 Constitution, adopted a year before Mao's death, abolished the position of the Procurator–General (it was restored three years later, in 1978).

Following the temporary abolition of the office of the Procurator–General in 1975, Zhang was elected a Vice Chairman of the Standing Committee of the National People's Congress, holding that office until his death in December 1981, at the age of 83.

Political offices
| Preceded by none | PRC Fujian Governor and CPC Fujian Committee Secretary; 1949–1954 | Succeeded by Ye Fei |
| Preceded by Luo Ronghuan | Procurator-General of the Supreme People's Procuratorate; 1954–1975 | Succeeded by Huang Huoqing |
