= Hu Ping (politician) =

Chinese politician (1930–2020)

- 胡平

Minister of Commerce
- In office April 1988 – March 1993
- Premier: Li Peng
- Preceded by: Liu Yi
- Succeeded by: Position revoked

Governor of Fujian
- In office January 1983 – September 1987
- Party secretary: Xiang Nan; Chen Guangyi
- Preceded by: Ma Xingyuan
- Succeeded by: Wang Zhaoguo

Personal details
- Born: 1 July 1930 Jiaxing County, Zhejiang, China
- Died: 4 August 2020 (aged 90) Beijing, China
- Party: Chinese Communist Party
- Education: Suzhou Technical School

Hu Ping (Chinese: 胡平; pinyin: Hú Píng; 1 July 1930 – 4 August 2020) was a Chinese politician.

== Biography ==
Born in Jiaxing, Zhejiang, he was a member of the Chinese Communist Party and was Governor of Fujian from 1983 to 1987. He was also the Minister of Commerce from 1988 to 1993.

Hu died on 4 August 2020 in Beijing, aged 90.

Government offices
Preceded by Ma Xingyuan	Governor of Fujian; 1983–1987	Succeeded by Wang Zhaoguo
Preceded by Liu Yi	Minister of Commerce; 1988–1993	Succeeded by Position revoked
