= Zhang Zhinan =

Chinese politician

- 张志南

Executive Vice Governor of Fujian
- In office February 2013 – April 2020
- Governor: Su Shulin→Yu Weiguo→Tang Dengjie
- Preceded by: Chen Hua
- Succeeded by: Zhao Long

Director of Fujian Provincial Development and Reform Commission
- In office July 2005 – May 2010
- Preceded by: Su Zengtian
- Succeeded by: Zheng Shanjie

Communist Party Secretary of Shanghang County
- In office March 1993 – April 1995
- Preceded by: Ding Shida
- Succeeded by: Ma Chengjia

Magistrate of Shanghang County
- In office September 1990 – March 1993
- Preceded by: You Ziqing
- Succeeded by: Zheng Ruzhan

Personal details
- Born: October 1960 (age 65–66) Longyan, Fujian, China
- Party: Chinese Communist Party (expelled; 1979-2020)
- Education: Longyan University

Chinese name
- Traditional Chinese: 張志南
- Simplified Chinese: 张志南
Transcriptions
Standard Mandarin
- Hanyu Pinyin: Zhāng Zhìnán

Zhang Zhinan (Chinese: 张志南; born October 1960) is a former Chinese politician who spent his entire career in southeast China's Fujian province. He was investigated by the Chinese Communist Party's anti-graft agency in April 2020. Previously he served as executive vice governor of Fujian and was also a member of the Standing Committee of the Chinese Communist Party Fujian Provincial Committee. He was a delegate to the 18th and 19th National Congress of the Chinese Communist Party. He was a delegate to the 12th National People's Congress. Zhang became the first official at provincial or ministerial level to be investigated by the anti-corruption watchdog in 2020, only seven days earlier than Sun Lijun, former deputy minister of Public Security.

== Early life and education ==
Zhang was born in Longyan, Fujian, in October 1960. He joined the Chinese Communist Party in May 1979. In September 1979, he was accepted to Long Normal University (now Longyan University), where he majored in Chinese.

== Career ==
=== Career in Longyan ===
After graduating in July 1981, he became deputy sector chief of the Organization Department of Longyan Municipal Committee of the Chinese Communist Party. Seven years later, he was elevated to head of the Publicity Department of Longyan Municipal Committee of the Chinese Communist Party, but having held the position for only three months. In December 1988, he was transferred to Shanghang County and appointed deputy Party chief. In September 1990, he was named acting magistrate of Shanghang County, replacing You Ziqing. He was installed as magistrate in March 1991. In February 1993, he was promoted to Party chief, the top political position in the county. He returned to Longyan in April 1995 and continued to work as head of the Publicity Department of Longyan Municipal Committee of the Chinese Communist Party.

=== Career in Fuzhou ===
Zhang went to Fuzhou, capital of Fujian, in March 1997 and served as deputy secretary and then secretary of Fujian Provincial Committee of the Communist Youth League.

=== Career in Sanming ===
In February 1998, he was transferred to Sanming and appointed vice mayor.

=== Career in Fuzhou ===
Zhang returned to Fuzhou in May 2002 and served as deputy secretary general of Fujian Provincial Government. In 2005, he concurrently served as director and Party branch secretary of Fujian Provincial Development and Reform Commission. He was executive vice governor of Fujian in February 2013, and held that office until April 2020.

== Downfall ==
On April 12, 2020, he has been placed under investigation for serious violations of laws and regulations by the Central Commission for Discipline Inspection (CCDI), the party's internal disciplinary body, and the National Supervisory Commission, the highest anti-corruption agency of China. He was removed from public office on April 26. On September 30, he was expelled from the Chinese Communist Party and dismissed from public office. On October 19, he was arrested for taking bribes and abuse of power.

On March 22, 2022, Zhang was sentenced to 14 years in prison for accepting bribes worth over 34.3 million yuan (about 5.4 million U.S. dollars) and abusing his power and was also fined 3 million yuan (about 471,000 U.S. dollars).

Government offices
Preceded by You Ziqing (游子清)	Magistrate of Shanghang County; 1990-1993	Succeeded by Zheng Ruzhan (郑如占)
Preceded by Su Zengtian	Director of Fujian Provincial Development and Reform Commission; 2005-2010	Succeeded by Zheng Shanjie
Preceded by Chen Hua	Executive Vice Governor of Fujian; 2013-2020	Succeeded by Zhao Long
Party political offices
Preceded by Ding Shida (丁仕达)	Communist Party Secretary of Shanghang County; 1993-1995	Succeeded by Ma Chengjia (马承佳)
