= Han Xianchu =

Chinese general (1913–1986)

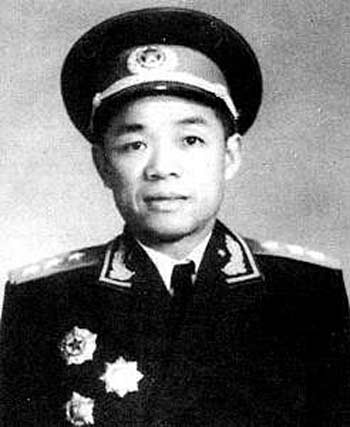
- Nickname: "Commander Tornado" (旋风司令)
- Born: January 30, 1913; Hong'an County, Hubei, China
- Died: October 3, 1986 (aged 73) Beijing, China
- Allegiance: People's Republic of China
- Branch: People's Liberation Army
- Service years: 1930−1983
- Rank: Colonel general (Shang Jiang)
- Commands: 224th Regiment, 75th Division; 75th Division; 15th Corps; 40th Corps; Deputy Commander, People's Volunteer Army
- Conflicts: Northern Expedition; Chinese Civil War; Long March; Hundred Regiments Offensive; Liaoshen Campaign; Pingjin Campaign; Hainan Campaign; Second Sino-Japanese War; Battle of Pingxingguan; Korean War; Battle of the Ch'ongch'on River; Third Battle of Seoul
- Awards: Order of Bayi (First Class Medal); Order of Independence and Freedom (First Class Medal); Order of Liberation (First Class Medal); Hero of Democratic People's Republic of Korea

Han Xianchu (Chinese: 韩先楚; pinyin: Hán Xiānchǔ; 1913–1986) was a Chinese general in the People's Liberation Army. He participated in various wars and battles such as Battle of Pingxingguan in the Second Sino-Japanese War, the Liaoshen, Pingjin, Hainan campaigns in the Chinese Civil War and the Korean War. In 1955, he was among the first group of military leaders to be awarded the Shang Jiang (Senior General) rank.

== Early life ==
Han was born in a farming village in Huang'an County (黄安), modern day Hong'an County (红安), Hubei Province in February 1913 (Hong An is known for being the hometown of many Military Generals). He stopped schooling and joined the People's Liberation Army when he was 17 and fought his way through countless battles and military campaigns. Han's early military background and tough childhood offered him a revolutionary mindset and a brave character. He had a nickname of "Tornado Commander", indicating his ever-changing tactics in the battlefield and the quick moves like the storm. He was also known as the "Best Field Commander" of PLA.

== Early involvement with the Chinese Communist Party ==
=== Joining the party ===
Following Kuomintang's (Chinese Nationalist Party) purge of Communists in April 1927, peasant revolts broke out throughout China in the Chinese Civil War. Han joined his local Peasant's Committee and participated in the Huangma Uprising (黄麻起义). The following year, he joined the Grand Union of Anti-Imperialism (反帝大同盟) and in the year after, he joined a Communist youth group. In 1930, Han joined Communist guerrillas in Xiaogan area and officially joined the Chinese Communist Party in October of the same year.

=== Soaring through the ranks ===
In 1931, Han led a squad and operated guerrilla warfare in Hubei. Han showed bravery and perseverance in numerous fights defending the local Communist powers, and proved to be an ardent supporter of the revolution. Han was assigned to the Red Army 25th Army, 75th Division, 225th Regiment, 2nd Battalion, 5th Company as a platoon commander in 1933. In November 1934, the Red 25th Army began a strategic retreat, known as the Long March to avoid annihilation by the Kuomintang. Han performed outstandingly against the pursuers and by the time his regiment arrived in Shaanxi, the destination of the Long March, Han was already promoted to commanding a battalion in the 15th Corps (rename the 25th Army). Soon after arriving in Shaanxi, Han led his battalion in the Laoshan Campaign (劳山战役). His forces ambushed Nationalist forces and won. After the campaign in October 1935, Han was promoted to Colonel of the 78th Division, 223rd Regiment for efforts in the campaign. He was only 22 years old.

=== East and West March ===
In February, 1936, Han was transferred to the newly established Red 75th Division, 224th Regiment as Colonel, and participated in Mao Zedong's East March (东征). The purpose is to establish a Communist position in Shanxi (山西). In April, Han became Deputy Division Dommander of the 75th Division and one month later, the Division Commander. Soon after returning to Shanbei, Shaanxi, Han joined the West March (西征). Han's forces attacked and occupied Dingbian County (定边县) (disobeying Peng Dehuai, Marshall of the Army at the time, who ordered Han to march around Dingbian City), and Yanchi County (盐池县), destroying the Nationalist's 2 cavalry battalions and 1 security regiment. Over 700 horses and a large quantity of supplies were gained for the Communist war effort.

=== Shanchengbao Campaign (山城堡战役) ===
Not only did Chiang Kai-shek refuse the Communist's plea to unite against the Japanese, he sent the Nationalist 1st, 3rd, 37th, Northeast 67th Armies, including a cavalry Army to destroy the new Communist base in Shaanxi. During the campaign, Han's 15th Corps was assigned to lure the Nationalist's 87th Division to the Shanchengbao area. The Nationalist 87th Division took the bait, and was attacked from 3 sides by Red 15th Corps led by Han and several other corps on November 21, 1936. The battle continued until noon the next day when the Communists successfully destroyed over 1 brigade. Other Nationalist forces were in retreat as well. Shaanxi was successfully defended, and became the heartland of future Communist activities. The Nationalist's failures also promoted the 'Second United Front' against Japan. After the campaign in early 1937, Han went to the military academy in Yan'an to learn strategies against the Japanese Imperial Army.

== Second Sino-Japanese War ==
Following the full-scale war between the two countries, and according to terms of the 'Second United Front', the 15th Corps was renamed to the National Revolutionary Army's 8th Route Army, 115th Division, 344th Brigade. Han was assigned the 344th Brigade's 688th Regiment's Deputy Colonel.

=== Battle of Pingxingguan ===
In September 1937, Japanese 5th Division, under the command of Itagaki Seishiro, was advancing through Pingxingguan (平型关). Lin Biao's 115th Division, including Han, laid an ambush and defeated the Japanese. The battle resulted in a minor, morale-boosting victory in which the Communists were able to capture a cache of weapons and annihilate a Japanese brigade. After the battle, Han remained stationed at Pingxingguan to halt further Japanese advances.

== Hainan Campaign ==
Because the disaster of the Battle of Kuningtou, Chinese communist commanders were wary of Island Campaigns, Mao Zedong issued a stand down to frontline commanders like Su Yu, Lin Biao and Chen Yi, to halt all military operations until the Soviet aid arrives. Han, however convinced Lin Biao to give him a chance to attack Hainan Island and the Hainan Campaign was a success. Hainan island was the last location taken over by Mao's forces during the civil war and the nationalists had to give it up and retreat to Taiwan Island with no other choices.

== Korean War ==
Han was the Commander of 40th Army under 13th Army Group during the Korean War. After the Hainan Campaign in May 1950, 40th Army was assigned as one of the four strategic armies deployed at Henan Province. Soon after the Korean War broke off, 40th Army was sent to Korea as one of the four armies firstly entering Korea. Han was promoted as the Vice Commander in chief of the Chinese People's Volunteer Army. On October 25, 1950, 40th Army fired the first shot of Sino-US military conflict in Korea. China claimed it was the first day of its involvement in Korean War. 40th Army participated 1st, 2nd, 3rd and 4th Phase Offensives. It was the campaign at the West Front that Han was in charge of by heading a small commanding headquarters. For most of the time, his commanding headquarters consisted of only three people and always on the road. Under his command, 116th Division of the 40th Army was the first to capture Seoul on January 6, 1951.

== Post-war ==
Han served as the first Military Chief of Staff of People's Liberation Army, Deputy Chief of Staff and commander of Military Region, Fuzhou, party first secretary, first secretary of the CPC Fujian Provincial Committee, Lanzhou military commander in chief and party's second secretary of the CPC Central Military Commission members and is on the Standing Committee.

In 1955, Han was awarded the rank of General, an independent Medal of Freedom, a Liberation Medal. He was elected to be on the first session of the CPPCC National Committee and the Fourth National People's Congress, he was on the first, second and third National Defense Commission. In 1958, on the eighth Session of the CPC, Han was the first to be elected to be the alternate member. In February 1967, Han chaired the committee of Fujian front-line troops, the CPC Central Military Commission. In 1983, Han was elected as the Vice Chairman of the National People's Congress Standing Committee, the Chinese Communists ninth, tenth, eleventh, twelfth session of the Central Committee. On October 3, 1986, General Han died in Beijing. Marshal Xu Xiangqian complimented General Han as "a heroic warrior." The first President Li Xiannian praised General Han as "a candor, straightforward, righteousness leader." On May 18, 1987, the city Hongan held a grand ceremony for him, and placed his ashes in Hungan military memorial cemetery.

== See also ==
- List of officers of the People's Liberation Army
- Ranks of the People's Liberation Army
- Chinese Civil War

Political offices
Preceded by Wei Jinshui	Governor of Fujian; 1968–1973	Succeeded by Liao Zhigao
Preceded by Jiang Yizhen	Party Secretary of Fujian; 1971–1973	Succeeded by Liao Zhigao
