= Su Zengtian =

Chinese politician

- 苏增添

Vice Chairperson of the Fujian Provincial People's Congress
- In office January 2014 – January 2018
- Chairperson: You Quan

Personal details
- Born: March 1954 (age 72) Yongding County, Fujian, China
- Party: Chinese Communist Party (1975–2024; expelled)
- Education: Fudan University; Xiamen University

Chinese name
- Simplified Chinese: 苏增添
- Traditional Chinese: 蘇增添
Transcriptions
Standard Mandarin
- Hanyu Pinyin: Sū Zēngtiān

Su Zengtian (Chinese: 苏增添; born March 1954) is a former Chinese politician who spent his entire career in southeast China's Fujian province. As of January 2024 he was under investigation by China's top graft busters. He has been retired for six years. Previously he served as vice chairperson of the Fujian Provincial People's Congress.

He was a representative of the 16th National Congress of the Chinese Communist Party.

== Early life and education ==
Su was born in Yongding County (now Yongding District, Longyan), Fujian, in March 1954. He joined the Chinese Communist Party (CCP) in January 1975. Nine months later, he enrolled at Fudan University, where he majored in industrial economy.

== Career ==
After graduating in 1978, he was despatched the Fujian Provincial Planning Commission and finally rose to become deputy director in May 1988.

In November 1992, he was transferred to the coastal city Xiamen and was admitted to member of the CCP Xiamen Municipal Committee, the city's top authority. He was deputy party secretary in June 1993, in addition to serving as executive deputy director of the Management Committee of Xiamen Haicang Xinglin Taiwan Business Investment Zone.

He became director of Fujian Provincial Commission for Economic Reform (later was reshuffled as Fujian Provincial Economic System Reform and Opening Up Committee) in July 1995, and served until March 2001, when he was appointed director of Fujian Provincial Development and Planning Commission (later renamed Fujian Provincial Development and Reform Commission). He was elevated to vice governor of Fujian in May 2005, a position at vice-ministerial level. He was made secretary of the Political and Legal Affairs Commission of the CCP Fujian Provincial Committee in November 2011 and was admitted to member of the CCP Fujian Provincial Committee, the province's top authority. Between June 2009 and September 2011, he also served as deputy party secretary and mayor of Fuzhou, capital of Fujian. In January 2014, he was chosen as vice chairperson of the Fujian Provincial People's Congress, the province's top legislative body.

== Downfall ==
On 21 January 2024, he was put under investigation for alleged "serious violations of discipline and laws" by the Central Commission for Discipline Inspection (CCDI), the party's internal disciplinary body, and the National Supervisory Commission, the highest anti-corruption agency of China. On July 31, he was expelled from the CCP. On August 21, he was detained by the Supreme People's Procuratorate. On December 16, he was indicted on suspicion of accepting bribes.

On 5 December 2025, Su was sentenced to death with a two-year reprieve for multiple duty-related crimes, including bribery and abuse of power by the Ningbo Intermediate People's Court. He was also deprived of his political rights for life, and ordered by the court to have all his personal assets confiscated and turn over all illicit gains and their interests to the state.

Government offices
Preceded by Zheng Songyan	Mayor of Fuzhou; 2009–2011	Succeeded by Yang Yimin
Party political offices
Preceded by Xu Qian	Secretary of the Political and Legal Affairs Commission of the Fujian Provincial Committee of the Chinese Communist Party; 2011–2014	Succeeded by Chen Dong
