= Jiang Yizhen =

Chinese politician (1915-1994)

Jiang Yizhen (Chinese: 江一真; March 1915 – March 24, 1994) was a Chinese politician. He was born in Liancheng County, Fujian. In 1933, he attended the Red Army Medical School in the Jiangxi Soviet and joined the Long March in 1934. He was Chinese Communist Party Committee Secretary and Governor of his home province. He was People's Congress Chairman of Hebei.

Preceded by Ye Fei	Party Secretary of Fujian	Succeeded by Han Xianchu
Preceded by Ye Fei	Governor of Fujian	Succeeded by Wei Jinshui
Preceded by new office	People's Congress Chairman of Hebei	Succeeded by Liu Bingyan
