= Song Defu =

Chinese politician

Song Defu (Chinese: 宋德福; pinyin: Sòng Défú; Pe̍h-ōe-jī: Song Tek-hok; February 1946 – September 13, 2007) was a Chinese politician, best known for his terms as the First Secretary of the Communist Youth League of China, Minister of Personnel, and the Communist Party Secretary of Fujian province.

== Biography ==
Song Defu was born into the family of a Communist Party official in Yanshan, Hebei Province. He joined the Chinese Communist Party in 1965. Song joined the army at 19, and retired from service in 1993. Thanks to the recommendation of the army, he entered Communist Youth League headquarters as a secretary of its secretariat in 1983, and worked closely with Hu Jintao, who led the Youth League at the time. In 1985, he succeeded Hu as the First Secretary of Communist Youth League. Meanwhile, he also served as deputy director of organization department of General Political Department in the army. From 1985 to 1993, he remained a major leader of Communist Youth League. His colleagues at Youth League during that time included some prominent figures in future Chinese politics, such as Liu Yandong, Zhang Baoshun, Li Keqiang, Li Yuanchao, Liu Qibao, and Yuan Chunqing.

In 1993, Song entered the state council and became the Minister of Personnel. At age of 47, he was then the youngest minister in the government. From 2000 to 2004, Song served as the party chief of Fujian province.

In 2002, the new generation of leaders emerged in China, and Song was seen as having a promising future. Song was regarded as a leader with the most abundant political experience, including not only military background, but also positions ranging from Communist Youth League, major ministry of the state, and stints in provincial government. However, due to health problems, Song ultimately could not realize his ambition on a larger political stage. In December 2004, Song was relieved of his duties as party chief of Fujian, succeeded by Lu Zhangong. Although the party never released the reason for his departure, it was widely believed that poor health was the reason. Hong Kong media reported that Song may have had lung cancer. In 2005 he was named the deputy head of a coordination committee for "identifying talent".

Song died in 2007 at the age of 61, still considered within a politician's "prime" in the context of Communist Party officials. At his funeral, following his will, he was wearing military uniform and red tie. His body was covered by the flag of Chinese Communist Party, and the flag of Communist Youth League was placed by his head.

Song was an alternate member of the 12th Central Committee of the Chinese Communist Party, and a member of 13th to 16th Central Committees. He was a member of standing committee of the 9th National Political Consultative Conference.

He died in 2007 at the age of 61.

Party political offices
| Preceded by Hu Jintao | First Secretary of the Communist Youth League of China; 1985–1993 | Succeeded by Li Keqiang |
| Preceded by Chen Mingyi | Communist Party Secretary of Fujian; 2000–2004 | Succeeded by Lu Zhangong |
