= Chu Cheng =

Chu Cheng may refer to:

- Chu Cheng (also romanized as Ju Zheng), a Chinese of Chinese Nationalist Party (KMT).
- Cheng Chu Sian, an athlete from Malaysia.
