= Sun Chunlan =

Chinese politician (born 1950)

- 孙春兰
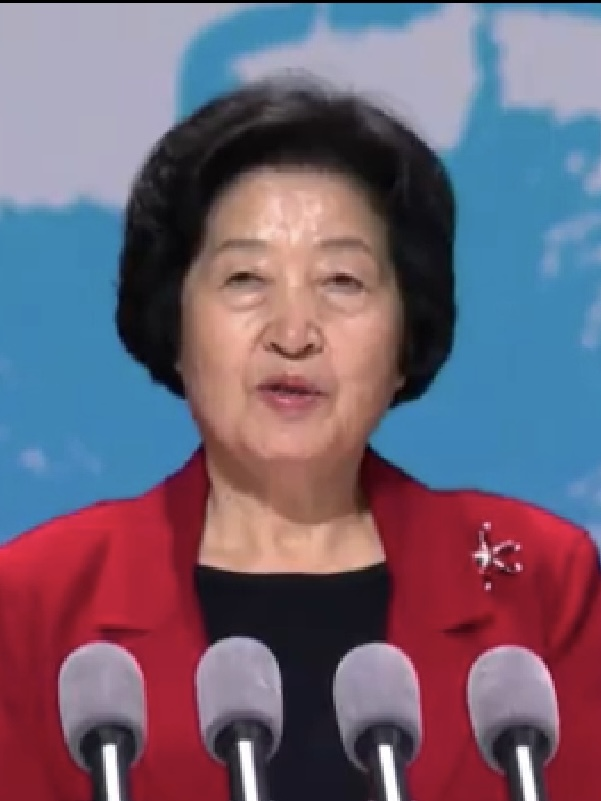
- Sun in 2021

Vice Premier of China
- In office 19 March 2018 – 11 March 2023 Serving with Han Zheng, Hu Chunhua, Liu He
- Premier: Li Keqiang

Head of the United Front Work Department
- In office 31 December 2014 – 7 November 2017
- Deputy: Wang Zhengwei; Zhang Yijiong (executive)
- General secretary: Xi Jinping
- Preceded by: Ling Jihua
- Succeeded by: You Quan

Party Secretary of Tianjin
- In office 21 November 2012 – 30 December 2014
- Preceded by: Zhang Gaoli
- Succeeded by: Huang Xingguo (acting)

Party Secretary of Fujian
- In office 30 November 2009 – 21 November 2012
- Preceded by: Lu Zhangong
- Succeeded by: You Quan

Party Secretary of Dalian
- In office 2001–2005
- Preceded by: Bo Xilai
- Succeeded by: Zhang Chengyin

Personal details
- Born: 24 May 1950 (age 76) Shenyang, Dongbei Area, People's Republic of China
- Party: Chinese Communist Party (1973–present)
- Education: Anshan Industrial Technology College
- Occupation: Politician

Chinese name
- Simplified Chinese: 孙春兰
- Traditional Chinese: 孫春蘭
- Literal meaning: Sun (surname) Spring-Orchidaceae
Transcriptions
Standard Mandarin
- Hanyu Pinyin: Sūn Chūnlán
- IPA: [swə́n ʈʂʰwə́nlǎn]

Sun Chunlan (Chinese: 孙春兰; born 24 May 1950) is a Chinese retired politician. She served as the second-ranked Vice Premier of China and the highest-ranking incumbent female government official until March 2023. Previously, she served as a member of the Politburo of the Chinese Communist Party.

Sun served as the party chief of the coastal city of Dalian and as the First Secretary of All-China Federation of Trade Unions. From 2009 to 2014, Sun served in two prominent regional posts, first as the Chinese Communist Party Committee Secretary of Fujian province, then of Tianjin, one of China's four direct-controlled municipalities. Her tenure in Fujian made her the second female provincial-level party chief since the founding of the People's Republic of China in 1949 (the first was Wan Shaofen). Between 2014 and 2017, she served as head of the United Front Work Department of the Central Committee of the Chinese Communist Party.

== Early life and education ==
Sun was born on 24 May 1950 in Raoyang County, Hebei. She enrolled in the Anshan Industrial Technology Academy in Liaoning in 1965. After graduating with a degree in mechanics in 1969, Sun worked at Anshan Clock Factory, which made watches. There she rose from the shop floor to membership of the factory's CCP branch in 1971, which managed the operations of the factory. She joined the Chinese Communist Party in May 1973, during the latter stages of the Cultural Revolution. In 1974, she became the Communist Youth League secretary of the Light Industry Bureau of Anshan City. She was then transferred to the Anshan Textiles Factory to work as a manager in 1977, working there until 1988. In 1988 she became the chair of the women's federation of Anshan, working there until 1991.

== Career ==
In 1990, Sun was transferred to work in the organs reporting directly to the provincial party leadership, paving the way for further career advancement. She became the deputy head of the Workers' Union of Liaoning in 1991, and the head of the Women's Association of Liaoning in 1993. In 1994 she became head of the Workers' Union of Liaoning, the provincial trade union federation, a year later she began sitting on the Liaoning provincial Party Standing Committee; achieving such a feat at age 45 was rare. In 1997, Sun was named deputy party secretary of Liaoning and president of the provincial party school.

In 2001, the party secretary of the bustling coastal city of Dalian departed the city to become the governor of Liaoning. Sun was then confirmed as party secretary of Dalian with party committee members unanimously confirming her nomination. She served in the post from 2001 to 2005, before being transferred to work in Beijing. Sun was named the Vice Chair of the All-China Federation of Trade Unions (ACFTU) at the Third Session of the 14th ACFTU Executive Committee, and then the First Secretary of the ACFTU Secretariat at the Eighth Session of the 14th ACFTU Presidium In December 2005.

=== Fujian ===
In a December 2009 re-shuffle, Sun Chunlan was named party secretary of Fujian Province, the first female to take such a high-level secretaryship since Wan Shaofen, Party Secretary of Jiangxi in the 1980s. Provincial party chief positions are of high significance and are some of the most powerful positions.

=== Tianjin ===
After the 18th Party Congress held in November 2012, Sun became the party secretary of Tianjin municipality, China's richest provincial-level jurisdiction by GDP at the time, taking the post vacated by Zhang Gaoli, who became a member of the Politburo Standing Committee. As Party Secretary of Tianjin, Sun joined the elite ranks of the Politburo of the Chinese Communist Party as one of the two women on the body (the other was Vice-Premier Liu Yandong). She additionally became the first female party chief of a direct-controlled municipality in party history.

=== United Front Work Department ===
After the investigation and dismissal of former Hu Jintao aide Ling Jihua as head of the United Front Work Department, Sun was named as head of the department on December 31, 2014. Sun was the first United Front chief to hold a concurrent Politburo seat since Ding Guangen. Her post in Tianjin was succeeded on an interim basis by Mayor Huang Xingguo. In 2015, Wang Zhengwei, Vice-chairman of the Chinese People's Political Consultative Conference, was named deputy head of the department, assisting Sun, creating a unique situation where two of the top leaders of the United Front were held by "deputy national leader" ranked figures.

Sun is a member of the 19th Politburo of the Chinese Communist Party. She was also an alternate of the 15th and 16th Central Committees of the Chinese Communist Party, and a full member of the 17th, 18th and 19th Central Committees.

=== Vice Premier ===
In October 2017, after the 19th Party Congress, Sun was reappointed as a member of the Politburo. In March 2018, Sun was appointed as the Vice Premier of China.

She was awarded the Gold Olympic Order after the 2022 Winter Olympics for her responsibility for the anti-COVID management of the Olympic Winter Games. According to The New York Times, Sun Chunlan become a target of Chinese netizens expressing their anger towards the Zero-COVID policy.

Sun Chunlan retired from Politburo after 20th Party Congress, and as Vice Premier in March 2023.

== Post-retirement ==
On 9 November 2023, Sun Chunlan became the president of the International Confucian Association.

Party political offices
Preceded by Ling Jihua	Head of the United Front Work Department; 2014–2017	Succeeded by You Quan
Preceded by Zhang Gaoli	Party Secretary of Tianjin Municipality; 2012–2014	Succeeded by Huang Xingguo
Preceded by Lu Zhangong	Party Secretary of Fujian Province; 2009–2012	Succeeded by You Quan
Preceded by Bo Xilai	Party Secretary of Dalian City; 2001–2005	Succeeded by Zhang Chengyin
