= Lu Zhangong =

Chinese politician (born 1952)

- 卢展工
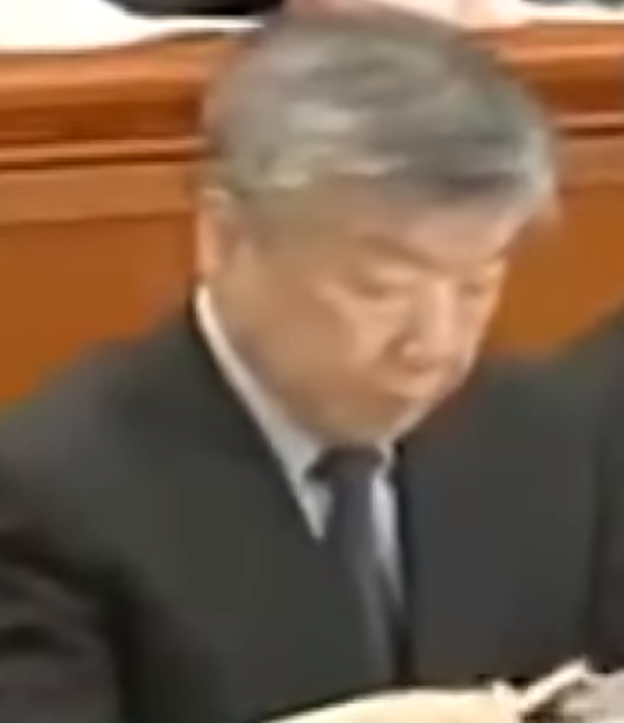

Vice Chairman of the Chinese People's Political Consultative Conference
- In office 11 March 2013 – 10 March 2023
- Chairman: Yu Zhengsheng; Wang Yang

Party Secretary of Henan
- In office November 2009 – March 2013
- Preceded by: Xu Guangchun
- Succeeded by: Guo Gengmao

Party Secretary of Fujian
- In office February 2004 – November 2009
- Preceded by: Song Defu
- Succeeded by: Sun Chunlan

Governor of Fujian
- In office October 2002 – December 2004
- Preceded by: Xi Jinping
- Succeeded by: Huang Xiaojing

Personal details
- Born: May 1952 (age 74) Cixi, Zhejiang, China
- Party: Chinese Communist Party
- Education: Heilongjiang Construction Engineering School; Nanjing University of Science and Technology; Harbin Institute of Technology

Lu Zhangong (simplified Chinese: 卢展工; traditional Chinese: 盧展工; pinyin: Lú Zhǎngōng; Pe̍h-ōe-jī: Lo Tian-kang; born May 1952) is a Chinese politician. He is, since 2013, a Vice Chairman of the Chinese People's Political Consultative Conference, and previously served as the Party Secretary of Fujian and Henan provinces, and Governor of Fujian.

== Biography ==
Born in Cixi, Zhejiang Province, he joined the workforce in March 1969, and joined the Chinese Communist Party (CCP) in January 1975.

In September 1988, he became the Deputy Party Secretary of Jiaxing and the secretary of the discipline commission there. He was elevated to the position of party chief of Jiaxing in December 1989. In March 1991, he became the deputy director of the organization department of the CCP Zhejiang committee. He was promoted to director of the organization department and a member of the Zhejiang provincial Party Standing Committee in December 1992. One year later, he became the vice secretary of the CCP Zhejiang committee and head of the organization department.

In July 1996, Lu was appointed Deputy Party Secretary of Hebei province. In October 1998, he became the vice chairman of the All-China Federation of Trade Unions, secretary of its secretariat and deputy secretary of its Party group. In January 2001, he was appointed deputy party chief of Fujian, and became vice governor and then acting governor of Fujian in October 2002. His post of governor was confirmed in January 2003. In February 2004, he became acting secretary of the CCP Fujian committee, and on December 16 of that year, he resigned from his post as governor of Fujian and became the CCP party chief of the province. In January 2005, he was elected chairman of the standing committee of the Fujian People's Congress. In December 2009, he was named CCP Secretary of Henan province, China's most populous. He was then reelected as secretary of central China's Henan Provincial Committee of the Chinese Communist Party (CCP) on October 30, 2011.

Lu was an alternate member of the 15th Central Committee of the Chinese Communist Party, and a full member of the 16th, 17th, 18th and 19th Central Committees.

== See also ==
- Henan Grave Removal Project

Party political offices
| Preceded by Xu Guangchun | Party Secretary of Henan; November 2009 – March 2013 | Succeeded by Guo Gengmao |
| Preceded by Song Defu | Party Secretary of Fujian; February 2004 – November 2009 | Succeeded by Sun Chunlan |
| Preceded by Xi Jinping | Governor of Fujian; October 2002 – December 2004 | Succeeded by Huang Xiaojing |
