= Ye Fei =

Chinese general and politician (1914–1999)

Colonel General Ye Fei
- 叶飞
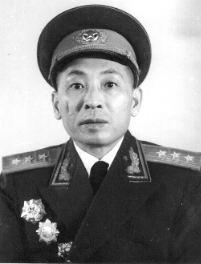
- Ye in 1955

Vice Chairman of the Standing Committee of the National People's Congress
- In office 18 June 1983 – 27 March 1993
- Chairman: Peng Zhen; Wan Li

Commander of the People's Liberation Army Navy
- In office January 1980 – August 1982
- Preceded by: Xiao Jinguang
- Succeeded by: Liu Huaqing

Political Commissar of the People's Liberation Army Navy
- In office February 1979 – January 1980
- Preceded by: Su Zhenhua
- Succeeded by: Li Yaowen

Minister of Transport
- In office January 1975 – February 1979
- Premier: Hua Guofeng
- Preceded by: Sun Daguang
- Succeeded by: Zeng Sheng

Party Secretary of Fujian
- In office October 1954 – June 1958
- Preceded by: Zhang Dingcheng
- Succeeded by: Jiang Yizhen

Governor of Fujian
- In office October 1954 – January 1959
- Preceded by: Zhang Dingcheng
- Succeeded by: Jiang Yizhen

Personal details
- Born: Sixto Mercado Tiongco (Yap Tiu Heng); 7 May 1914 Tiaong, Tayabas, Philippine Islands
- Died: 18 April 1999 (aged 84) Beijing, China
- Party: Chinese Communist Party

Military service
- Allegiance: China
- Branch/service: People's Liberation Army Ground Force; People's Liberation Army Navy
- Years of service: 1932−82
- Rank: Colonel General
- Commands: People's Liberation Army Navy; Fuzhou Military Region; Xiamen Military Control Commission; 10th Army Corps, Third Field Army; 1st Column, East China Field Army; 1st Column, Shandong Field Army; 1st Brigade, 1st Division, New Fourth Army; 1st Column, New Fourth Army; 6th Regiment, 3rd Detachment, New Fourth Army

Ye Fei (simplified Chinese: 叶飞; traditional Chinese: 葉飛; pinyin: Yè Fēi; Pe̍h-ōe-jī: Ia̍p Hui; 7 May 1914 – 18 April 1999) was a Philippine-born Chinese military general and politician of the People's Republic of China. Born Sixto Mercado Tiongco in the Philippines to a Sangley Chinese father and a Mestiza Filipina mother, he joined the Chinese Communist Party at a young age and fought many battles as a senior commander of the People's Liberation Army in the Chinese Civil War. At age 40, he was among the first PLA commanders to be awarded the rank of Colonel General by the newly established People's Republic of China and later served as Commander-in-Chief of the Chinese Navy. He also served in a number of civilian posts including Governor and Communist Party Chief of Fujian Province, and Minister of Transport.

== Early life ==
=== Birth in the Philippines ===
Ye Fei was born Sixto Mercado Tiongco on 7 May 1914 in the town of Tiaong in the then-named Tayabas Province, in the Philippines. His father was Yap Sun Uy (葉蓀衛; Hokkien Pe̍h-ōe-jī: Ia̍p Sun-ūi), a Sangley Chinese merchant from Nan'an, Fujian Province who had moved to the Philippines in 1900 and adopted the Philippine name Tiongco, and his mother was Francisca Mercado, a Mestiza Filipina from a local Catholic family. Yap converted to Catholicism in order to get approval of Mercado's parents for the marriage. Ye Fei's original Chinese name was 葉啟亨 (Hokkien Pe̍h-ōe-jī: Ia̍p Khé-heng; Mandarin pinyin: Yè Qǐhēng).

=== Youth in China ===
In 1919 Ye Fei, then four years old, and his older brother 葉啟存 (Hokkien Pe̍h-ōe-jī: Ia̍p Khé-chûn; Mandarin pinyin: Yè Qǐcún), were brought by their father to his Chinese hometown for schooling. Starting in 1926 he attended Zhongshan Middle School in Xiamen and then the Thirteenth High School of Fujian.

Ye Fei joined the underground Communist Youth League of China in May 1928, and the Chinese Communist Party in March 1932. In 1932 he was arrested by the Kuomintang government of the Republic of China and sentenced to a year in prison. As he was a Philippine citizen being a Chinese Filipino, his parents managed to arrange for his extradition to the Philippines (then a United States territory under the Insular Government of the Philippine Islands), and his mother set out for China to take him back. However, by the time Francisca Mercado reached Hong Kong, Ye Fei was already released from prison. Telling his mother that he was going to study in Japan, he instead went to Fujian to help establish the Communist guerrilla there.

== Wartime career ==
=== Chinese Civil War ===
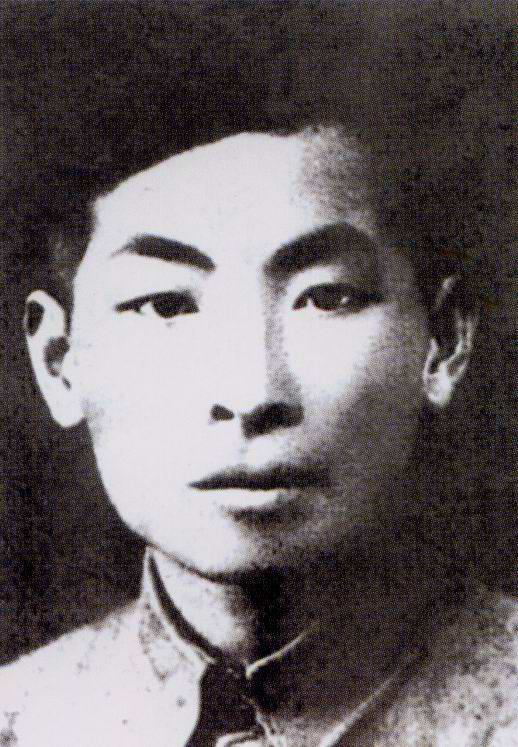
Ye Fei in his youth

In 1934 the Communist Chinese Red Army suffered a series of defeats by Chiang Kai-shek's Kuomintang forces, and started the Long March. With the escape of the Communist leadership from neighbouring Jiangxi Province to remote Shaanxi Province, Ye Fei's Eastern Fujian guerrilla was cut off from the main Communist forces and fought in isolation for three years. His older brother Ye Qicun was killed in the late 1930s by the Kuomintang.

=== Second Sino-Japanese War ===
After the eruption of the Second Sino-Japanese War, the civil war between the Communists and Kuomintang was suspended, and the two parties agreed to form a Second United Front to fight the invading Japanese. Ye Fei was made a regiment commander in the newly formed New Fourth Army and moved to the Jiangnan region to continue his guerrilla warfare, this time against the Japanese occupying force. His early activities included 1939 attacks on the Japanese-controlled Shanghai–Nanjing Railway and Shanghai Hongqiao Airport.

In 1940, Ye married Wang Yugeng, who also served in the New Fourth Army.

In 1940 Ye Fei moved across the Yangtze River to northern Jiangsu Province to continue fighting the Japanese as well as the Kuomintang, the nominal ally of the Communists. He was appointed the commander of the first column of the Northern Jiangsu division of the New Fourth Army under the leadership of Su Yu. In October, he annihilated a Kuomintang brigade in the Battle of Huangqiao. In 1944, he commanded the Communist force in the Battle of Cheqiao defeating the Japanese. The next year he was appointed commander of the Central Jiangsu military region and deputy commander of the Jiangsu-Zhejiang military region.

=== Resumption of Civil War ===
After the surrender of Japan at the end of World War II, talks between the Communists and the Kuomintang broke down and the Chinese Civil War resumed. As a senior commander Ye Fei participated in numerous battles including the Menglianggu Campaign and the Huaihai Campaign. In February 1949 he was appointed Commander of the 10th Army Group of the People's Liberation Army.

In April 1949 Ye Fei's forces attacked HMS Amethyst on the Yangtze River, and forced her to remain anchored for 40 days (see main article: Yangtze Incident).

After participating in the Battle of Shanghai (1949) in May 1949, Ye Fei, with Wei Guoqing as political commissar, led the 10th Army Group in the battles of Fuzhou, Zhangzhou, and Xiamen, taking over most of Fujian Province from the Kuomintang defenders. On 28 October 1949, the Wenhui announced Ye being selected as Chairman of the Xiamen Military Control Commission. However, his forces suffered a major defeat in the Battle of Guningtou, during which more than ten thousand PLA soldiers were killed or captured when they landed on Kinmen Island off the Fujian coast. The Communists were never able to take over Kinmen and to this day Kinmen remains under the administration of the Republic of China (Taiwan). Ye Fei partially redeemed for the loss by winning the Dongshan Island Campaign in July 1953.

== Peacetime career ==
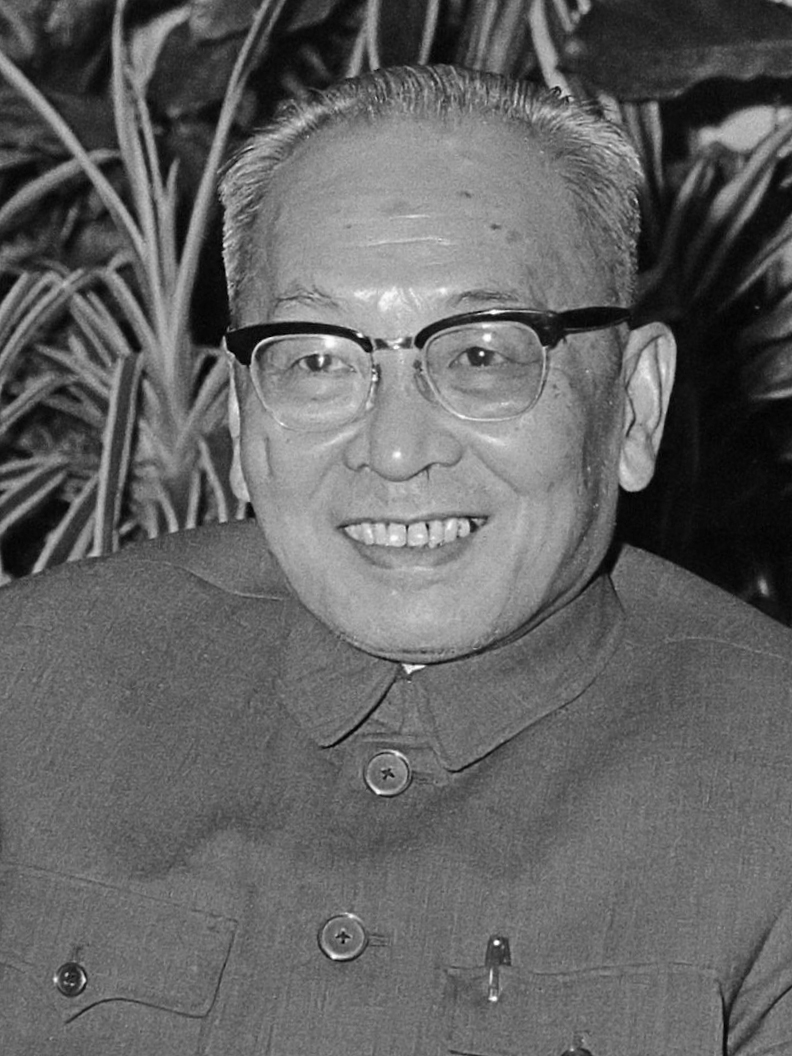
Ye in 1978

In 1953 Ye Fei was appointed Communist Party Chief and Governor of Fujian Province. He also concurrently served as deputy commander of the Nanjing Military Region. In 1955, at age 40, he was among the first group of People's Liberation Army commanders to be awarded the rank of General. From 1 July 1956, with the creation of the Fuzhou Military Region, he became its first commander.

During the Cultural Revolution Ye Fei suffered from persecution for his overseas ties, but was rehabilitated in 1975 and appointed China's Minister of Transport. He held the position until February 1979, when he was appointed by Deng Xiaoping as the political commissar of the People's Liberation Army Navy, despite having never served in the Navy before. The following year he was promoted to the position of Commander-in-Chief of the Navy, which he held until August 1982. From 1983 to 1993 he served as the vice-chairman of the Standing Committee of the 6th and the 7th National People's Congress.

=== Return to the Philippines ===
At the invitation of then-President Corazon Aquino, Ye Fei visited the Philippines in February 1989 as the vice-chairman of the Chinese Congress. This was the first time he returned to the country of his birth since leaving almost 70 years before. He spent two weeks in the country, visiting his parents' graves in Tiaong and having a reunion with his younger siblings, who were born after he left for China and had little idea of their brother's achievements.

=== Opposition to army crackdown in Tiananmen Square ===
During the Tiananmen Square protests of spring 1989, Ye Fei signed a letter opposing the enforcement of martial law by the Army in Beijing.

Due to the exigent circumstances, we as old soldiers, make the following request: Since the People's Army belongs to the people, it cannot stand against the people, much less kill the people, and must not be permitted to fire on the people and cause bloodshed; to prevent the situation from escalating, the Army must not enter the city.

— Ye Fei, Zhang Aiping, Xiao Ke, Yang Dezhi, Chen Zaidao, Song Shilun and Li Jukui, May 21, 1989 letter to the Central Military Commission and Capital Martial Law Command Headquarters

== Death and monument ==
Ye Fei died in Beijing on 18 April 1999, aged 84. On 29 March 2000, a memorial park in Tiaong was dedicated to Ye Fei, including a monument and a vocational school. Present at the inauguration were General Angelo Reyes, Foreign Secretary Domingo Siazon, Jr., Interior Secretary Alfredo Lim, and Chinese ambassador Fu Ying. This was the first in a series of events celebrating 25 years of diplomatic relations between the Philippines and the People's Republic of China.

Party political offices
| Preceded by Zhang Dingcheng | Party Secretary of Fujian; October 1954 – June 1958 | Succeeded by Jiang Yizhen |
Government offices
| Preceded by Zhang Dingcheng | Governor of Fujian; October 1954 – January 1959 | Succeeded by Jiang Yizhen |
| Preceded by Sun Daguang | Minister of Transport; January 1975 – February 1979 | Succeeded by Zeng Sheng |
Military offices
| New title | Commander of the Fujian Military District; 1949–1958 | Succeeded by Liu Yongsheng |
| New title | Political Commissar of the Fujian Military District; 1953–1957 | Succeeded by Wu Hongxiang |
| Preceded by Xiao Jinguang | Commander of the People's Liberation Army Navy; 1980–1982 | Succeeded by Liu Huaqing |
Educational offices
| Preceded by Wei Que | President of Huaqiao University; 1983–1988 | Succeeded by Chen Juewan |
