= He Guoqiang =

Chinese politician (born 1943)

- 贺国强
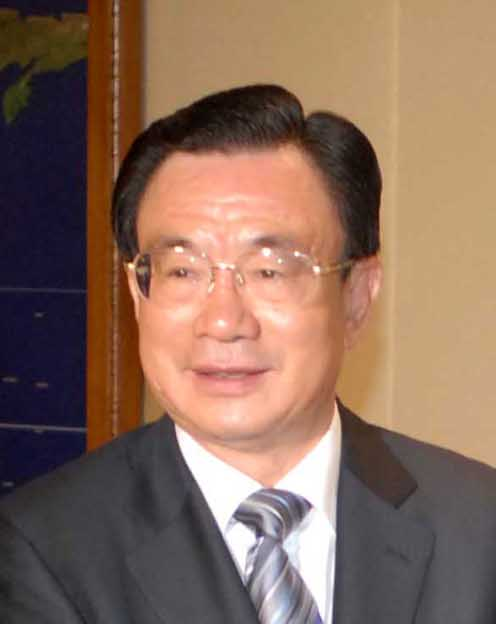
- He in 2008

Secretary of the Central Commission for Discipline Inspection
- In office 22 October 2007 – 15 November 2012
- Deputy: He Yong, others
- Preceded by: Wu Guanzheng
- Succeeded by: Wang Qishan

Head of the Organization Department of the Chinese Communist Party
- In office 24 October 2002 – 26 October 2007
- General Secretary: Hu Jintao
- Preceded by: Zeng Qinghong
- Succeeded by: Li Yuanchao

Personal details
- Born: October 1, 1943 (age 83) Xiangxiang County, Hunan Province, Republic of China
- Party: Chinese Communist Party
- Children: 2 sons, including He Jintao

He Guoqiang (simplified Chinese: 贺国强; traditional Chinese: 賀國強; pinyin: Hè Guóqiáng; born October 1, 1943) is a retired senior leader of the Chinese Communist Party (CCP). Between 2007 and 2012, He was a member of the Politburo Standing Committee (PSC), China's most powerful decision-making body, and the Secretary of the Central Commission for Discipline Inspection, the party's anti-corruption agency. Earlier in his career, He served as the head of the Organization Department of the Chinese Communist Party, the governor of Fujian, and the Party Secretary of Chongqing.

== Career ==
He Guoqiang was born in Xiangxiang County (now Xiangxiang), Hunan on October 1. 1943. He joined the Chinese Communist Party in January 1966 and joined the work force in September 1966. He graduated from the Inorganic Chemistry Department at the Beijing Institute of Chemical Engineering where he had majored in inorganics. With his university education, he held the title of Senior Engineer. He was first assigned to work as a technician at the synthesis division of the Lunan Chemical Fertilizer Plant in Shandong. During his eleven years there he eventually made his way up to party branch secretary (de facto head of the plant).

Eventually He became an official at the chemical industry department of the Shandong provincial government. After that, he began taking on increasingly senior administrative roles, ascending through the ranks to become Party Committee Secretary in Jinan, the capital of Shandong, in 1987, and a member of the Shandong provincial Party Standing Committee. In 1991, he became deputy minister of Chemical Industry.

In October 1996, He was transferred to Fujian to become deputy governor, then acting governor. He assumed the post of the Governor of Fujian between 1997 and 1999. In June 1999, he was named the party secretary of Chongqing, only the second person to take on the job after the city gained direct-controlled municipality status. He remained in Chongqing until 2002. He moved to national prominence that year, becoming the head of the Organization Department of the Chinese Communist Party, overseeing party personnel.

He was named to the Politburo Standing Committee at the 17th Party Congress in November 2007, heading up the Central Commission for Discipline Inspection, in charge of stamping out corruption with party officials, replacing Wu Guanzheng. He was ordered by General Secretary Hu Jintao to go into earthquake areas in the aftermath of the 2008 Sichuan earthquake.

He Guoqiang was said to be a 'moderating' force on the PSC, with no apparent loyalties to any particular factions or patrons.

He Guoqiang retired from politics after the 18th Party Congress in November 2012.

== Family ==
He Guoqiang's eldest son, He Jintao (贺锦涛; born June 7, 1971), is a former soldier who eventually went into business. He Jintao founded the private equity firm Nepoch Capital. He Jintao worked with Morgan Stanley and China Resources on various investment projects. Several media sources have linked He Jintao with the corruption case involving Song Lin, former chief executive of China Resources. He Guoqiang's second son, He Jinlei (贺锦雷), was a vice president at the investment arm of China Development Bank, CDB Capital, a state-owned company which invested heavily in Alibaba's initial public offering in 2014. The wives and children of both of He Guoqiang's sons are said to be living in the San Francisco Bay Area of the United States.

In May 2014, U.S.-based Chinese-language website Duowei reported that He's successor as central discipline secretary Wang Qishan scheduled a meeting with him to discuss ongoing investigation into the business activities of his sons, and He Jintao specifically. The same article mentioned that the likelihood of He Guoqiang's personal involvement in corruption was low, and that He urged his sons to cooperate with the investigation.

Party political offices
Preceded by Zhang Delin	Party Secretary of Chongqing; 1999–2002	Succeeded by Huang Zhendong
Preceded by Zeng Qinghong	Head of the Organization Department of the Chinese Communist Party; 2002–2007	Succeeded by Li Yuanchao
Preceded by Wu Guanzheng	Secretary of the Central Commission for Discipline Inspection; 2007–2012	Succeeded by Wang Qishan
Government offices
Preceded by Chen Mingyi	Governor of Fujian; 1996–1999	Succeeded by Xi Jinping
Order of precedence
Preceded by Li Keqiang; Vice Premier	8th Rank of the Chinese Communist Party; 17th Politburo Standing Committee	Succeeded by Zhou Yongkang; Political and Legislative
