= Wang Zhaoguo =

Chinese politician (born 1941)

- 王兆国
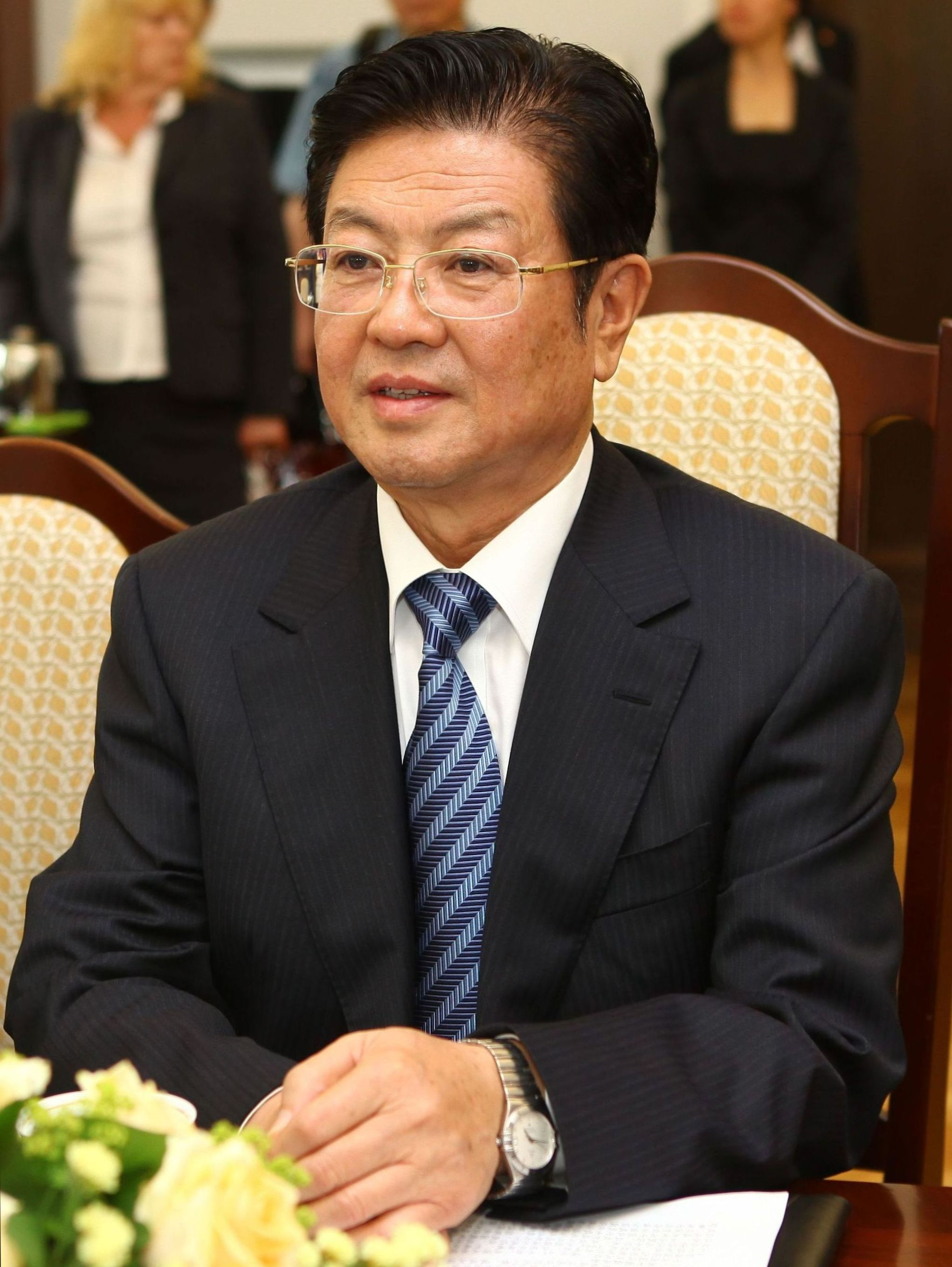
- Wang in 2011

Vice Chairman of the Standing Committee of the National People's Congress
- In office 15 March 2003 – 14 March 2013
- Chairman: Wu Bangguo

Chairman of the All-China Federation of Trade Unions
- In office December 2002 – February 2013
- Preceded by: Wei Jianxing
- Succeeded by: Li Jianguo

Vice Chairman of the Chinese People's Political Consultative Conference
- In office 27 March 1993 – 13 March 2003
- Chairman: Li Ruihuan

Head of the United Front Work Department
- In office December 1992 – December 2002
- General Secretary: Jiang Zemin
- Preceded by: Ding Guangen
- Succeeded by: Liu Yandong

Governor of Fujian
- In office September 1987 – November 1990
- Preceded by: Hu Ping
- Succeeded by: Jia Qinglin

Director of the General Office of the Chinese Communist Party
- In office April 1984 – April 1986
- General Secretary: Hu Yaobang
- Preceded by: Qiao Shi
- Succeeded by: Wen Jiabao

First Secretary of the Communist Youth League of China
- In office December 1982 – December 1984
- Preceded by: Han Ying
- Succeeded by: Hu Jintao

Personal details
- Born: July 14, 1941 (age 85) Fengrun, Tangshan, Hebei, Republic of China
- Party: Chinese Communist Party (1965–2013)
- Education: Harbin Institute of Technology

Chinese name
- Simplified Chinese: 王兆国
- Traditional Chinese: 王兆國
Transcriptions
Standard Mandarin
- Hanyu Pinyin: Wáng Zhàoguó
Southern Min
- Hokkien POJ: Ông Tiāu-kok

Wang Zhaoguo (Chinese: 王兆国; pinyin: Wáng Zhàoguó; born 14 July 1941) is a Chinese retired politician who came to prominence during the era of Deng Xiaoping.

An automobile factory technician by trade, Wang had a long and varied political career, known for having acquired a ministerial-level position at the age of 41. Before entering the Politburo of the Chinese Communist Party in 2002, he successively served as the first secretary of the Communist Youth League of China, the director of the Party General Office, a secretary of the Central Secretariat, the governor of Fujian, the head of the United Front Work Department and vice chairman of the CPPCC.

Initially speculated to be a political star and once regarded as the successor of the office of Party General Secretary, Wang's career leveled out after he entered the Politburo of the Chinese Communist Party in 2002. In his later years, he served as the head of the All-China Federation of Trade Unions and as a vice chairman of the Standing Committee of the National People's Congress. He retired in 2013.

== Early life ==
Wang Zhaoguo was born in Fengrun County, Hebei on 14 July 1941 to a poor family. He went to school later than his peers due to his family situation. He joined the Chinese Communist Party (CCP) in 1965. He graduated from Harbin Institute of Technology in 1966, specializing in mechanical engineering. Between 1966 and 1968, at the height of the Cultural Revolution, Wang awaited assignment. Between 1968 and 1971, he worked as a technician at the First Automobile Works in Changchun. He then began working as the Communist Youth League leader at a factory owned by the Second Automobile Works (the predecessor to Dongfeng Motor).

== Rise to power ==
By 1979, the 38-year-old Wang had become the party chief of the Second Automobile Works. After the Cultural Revolution, Deng Xiaoping and a new group leaders introduced wide-ranging reforms. Deng was said to have been briefed on Wang's outstanding performance and sought to promote Wang. Wang entered the Central Committee of the Chinese Communist Party at a mere 41 years of age, and was selected to become the First Secretary of the Communist Youth League from 1982 to 1984. At this point, Hu Jintao was working as Wang's first deputy.

By 1984, Wang had become the director of the General Office of the Chinese Communist Party, essentially serving as the chief of staff of then party General Secretary Hu Yaobang; the next year, Wang earned a seat on the Secretariat, the party's top policy execution and implementation organ. That he advanced to national leadership at 44 years of age was seen as a promising sign that he was being groomed for the party's top leadership post. Wang was therefore seen as a close associate of Hu, given that both men had come from Communist Youth League backgrounds. Hu, a reformer, was ousted from power by a group of conservative party elders in 1987 due to irreconcilable differences over policy.

Wang had advocated for policies favouring the party "clean up its own act" and "self-discipline" as part of wider political reform programs spearheaded by Hu, and said that these changes must begin with the party's upper echelons. This move was met with resistance from party elders, who saw themselves as being unfairly targeted and politically vulnerable; Wang was subsequently removed as General Office chief. Wang was succeeded by Wen Jiabao, the deputy chief of the General Office at the time.

It is believed that Wang's exit from the elite ranks was delicately intertwined with Hu Yaobang's downfall, as his Youth League political forces were deliberately scattered around the country to weed out their influence. As the political winds in Beijing shifted towards more a conservative tone towards the late 1980s, Wang's political fortunes suffered.

Wang was named the governor of Fujian in 1987 after Hu Yaobang's resignation, in what was widely considered a demotion and 'banishment' from the political center stage in Beijing. The move was speculated to be suggested by respected party elder Chen Yun and approved by Deng Xiaoping. Possibly as a result of his term in Fujian, which sat just across the strait from Taiwan, Wang was named the director of the Taiwan Affairs Office in 1990 (he assumed the State Council office chief position first, then the party position in 1991).

In 1992, he was also named the head of the United Front Work Department of the Central Committee, in charge of rallying support from organizations not affiliated with the Communist Party. He was also elected Vice Chairperson of the Chinese People's Political Consultative Conference in March 1993, rejoining Party and State Leadership, and reelected in 1998. During his tenure, he notably oversaw the 1992 Consensus, where both the People's Republic of China and the Republic of China (ROC) recognize there is only one "China". He also oversaw the selection of the 11th Panchen Lama. He served in the post for some ten years.

== Politburo and beyond ==
At the 16th Party Congress, his erstwhile colleague and deputy at the Youth League, Hu Jintao, was elevated to become general secretary of the Chinese Communist Party. Wang gained a seat on the 25-member Politburo, but his career had by this point lagged far behind that of Hu and Wen Jiabao, his former deputies.

In March 2003, he was named the first-ranking vice chairman of the Standing Committee of the 10th National People's Congress, and was re-elected to the same position in 11th National People's Congress in 2008. He was a member of the 16th and 17th Politburos of the Chinese Communist Party. In addition, he also served as the Chairman of the All-China Federation of Trade Unions between December 2002 and February 2013.

Wang was a member of the 12th, 13th, 14th, 15th, 16th, and 17th Central Committees of the Chinese Communist Party, known for serving under four party general secretaries - Hu Yaobang, Zhao Ziyang, Jiang Zemin, and Hu Jintao. Wang retired from Politburo after the 18th Party Congress in November 2012, an event which saw Xi Jinping became General Secretary, and Wang officially retired from politics in March 2013 after he stepped down as vice chairperson of the NPC Standing Committee.

Wang made several public appearances after he retired. He visited his former employer Dongfeng Motors from May 17 to 18, 2013. He appeared with his wife on April 22, 2014, at the Zhou Enlai memorial house in Huai'an, Jiangsu. Wang also sent a commemorative floral basket along with Hu Jintao to mark the 25th anniversary of the death of Hu Yaobang in April 2014.

Party political offices
Preceded by Han Ying	First Secretary of the Communist Youth League of China; 1982–1984	Succeeded by Hu Jintao
Preceded by Ding Guangen	Head of the United Front Work Department; 1992–2002	Succeeded by Liu Yandong
Preceded by Qiao Shi	Director of the General Office of the Chinese Communist Party; 1984–1986	Succeeded by Wen Jiabao
Political offices
Preceded by Hu Ping	Governor of Fujian; 1987–1990	Succeeded by Jia Qinglin
Preceded by Wei Jianxing	Chairman of the All-China Federation of Trade Unions; 2002–2013	Succeeded by Li Jianguo
