= Yin Li =

Chinese politician

- 尹力
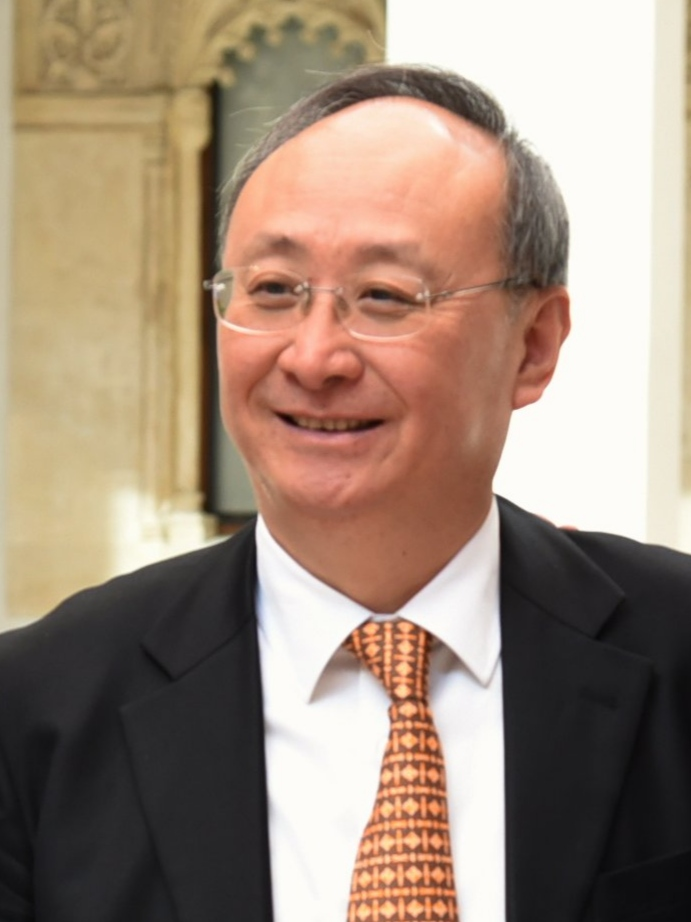
- Yin in 2019

Party Secretary of Beijing
- Incumbent
- Assumed office 13 November 2022
- Deputy: Yin Yong (Mayor)
- Preceded by: Cai Qi

Party Secretary of Fujian
- In office 1 December 2020 – 13 November 2022
- Deputy: Wang Ning (Governor); Zhao Long (Governor)
- Preceded by: Yu Weiguo
- Succeeded by: Zhou Zuyi

Governor of Sichuan
- In office 29 January 2016 – 2 December 2020
- Party Secretary: Wang Dongming; Peng Qinghua
- Preceded by: Wei Hong
- Succeeded by: Huang Qiang

Personal details
- Born: August 1962 (age 64) Linyi County, Shandong, China
- Party: Chinese Communist Party
- Education: Shandong Medical University; Russian Academy of Medical Sciences

Yin Li (Chinese: 尹力; pinyin: Yǐn Lì; born August 1962) is a Chinese politician currently serving as Party Secretary of Beijing and a member of the Politburo of the Chinese Communist Party.

Previously, he served as party secretary of Fujian Province from 2020 to 2022, governor of Sichuan from 2016 to 2020, deputy party secretary of Sichuan from 2015 to 2020, deputy director of China Food and Drug Administration from 2013 to 2015, and Vice Minister of Health from 2008 to 2013. He also served on the executive board of the World Health Organization from 2004 to 2005.

== Early life and education ==
Yin was born in Jinan, Shandong Province, China, and his family came from Linyi County nearby. He studied at Shandong Provincial Experimental High School as a student of the class of 1980.

At Shandong Medical University, Yin received his undergraduate education in medicine from 1980 to 1986 and graduate studies in social medicine and health management from 1986 to 1988. During this period, Yin Li expressed his reluctance to pursue a medical career, stating that doctors can only rescue lives individually; he articulated his aspiration to work in the public health service sector.

Upon obtaining a master's degree in 1988, Yin Li was chosen by China's State Education Committee to pursue studies in the Soviet Union. From 1988 to 1993, he pursued a PhD degree at the Institute of Social and Health Sciences, Economics, and Health Care Management of the Russian Academy of Medical Sciences.

== Career ==
=== Early career ===
Yin returned to China in 1993 and started his career as a cadre of the Department of Education, Science, Culture and Health at the Research Office of the State Council. Later at the research office, he served as the head of its international department and as an inspection officer.

=== Ministry of Health ===
In September 2002, Yin traveled to the United States to serve as a visiting scholar at the Harvard School of Public Health. Following the SARS epidemic broke out in China in early 2003, Yin was summoned by Beijing, ended his academic visit at Harvard University, and returned to China promptly in April 2003. He was appointed Deputy Director of the General Office of the Ministry of Health (at the director-general level) the following month. Yin Li was a government official who served as an expert at the symposium organized by Premier Wen Jiabao and helped with the efforts against SARS. In October 2003, Yin Li was appointed Director General of the Department of International Cooperation at the Ministry of Health. He served on the Executive Committee of the World Health Organization from January 2004 to May 2005, when he was elected Vice-Chairman of the Committee. In July 2006, he was appointed Director General of the General Office of the Ministry of Health. In September 2008, he was elevated to the Party Group and appointed Vice Minister of the Ministry of Health, so becoming the youngest officer to hold the position of Vice Minister of Health in China.

In February 2012, he was named head of the State Drug Administration; during his tenure, he effectively addressed the issue of enterprises manufacturing capsules with industrial gelatin. In November 2012, he was elected as an alternate of the 18th Central Committee of the Chinese Communist Party. In April 2013, he became Deputy Director of the National Health and Family Planning Commission, Deputy Director General of the State Food and Drug Administration (SFDA), which was the result of the amalgamation of several government departments.

=== Sichuan ===
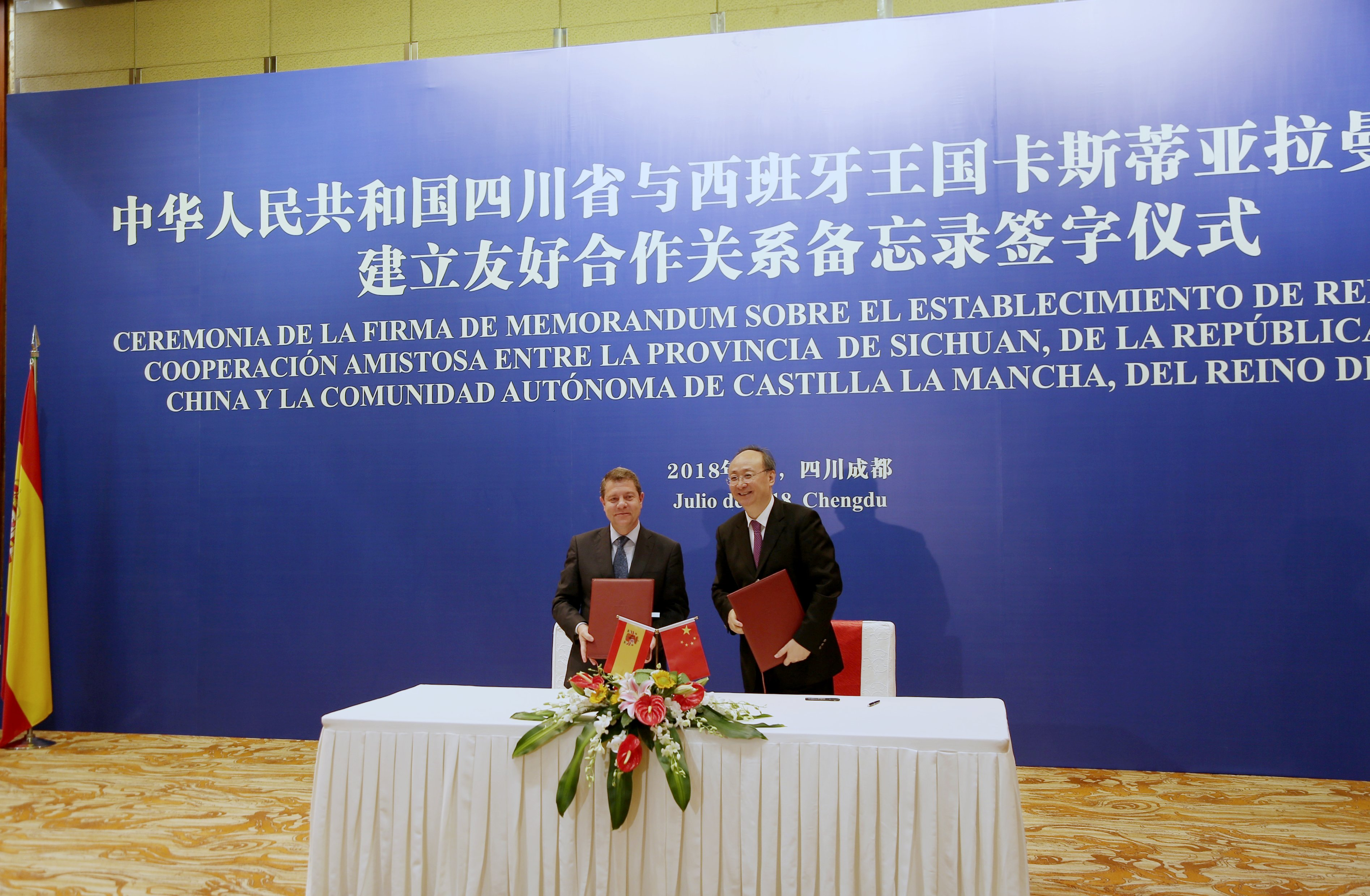
Emiliano García-Page, the president of Castilla–La Mancha, has executed a memorandum of amicable ties with Yin Li, the governor of Sichuan in China on July 2, 2018.

In March 2015, he started to serve as deputy party secretary of Sichuan Province; in May 2015, he served as the Minister of Publicity for the CCP Sichuan Provincial Committee On 29 January 2016, Yin assumed the post of Governor of Sichuan after his predecessor Wei Hong resigned in the wake of an internal party investigation into his conduct. Yin was the first provincial Governor to swear allegiance to the Constitution as part of his inauguration ceremony.

=== Fujian ===
On December 1, 2020, Yin was appointed as the Party Secretary of Fujian. On January 27, 2021, during the third plenary session of the Fifth Session of the Thirteenth National People's Congress of Fujian Province, Yin Li was chosen Chairman of the Fujian Provincial People's Congress Standing Committee. As party secretary, Yin oversaw Fujian's response to the COVID-19 pandemic. After an outbreak in the province in September 2021, Yin told a meeting of the Fujian Provincial Party Committee that the situation is "serious and complex, and the task of prevention and control is urgent and onerous". He left the post on November 13, 2022.

=== Beijing ===
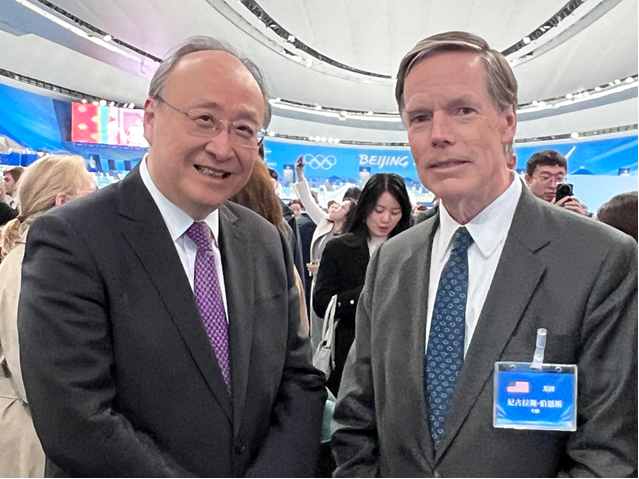
US Ambassador R. Nicholas Burns stands with CCP Beijing Secretary Yin Li on 24 November 2023

Yin was an alternate of the 18th Central Committee of the Chinese Communist Party and is a full member of the 19th Central Committee. On October 23, 2022, Yin Li was elected to the 20th Politburo of the Chinese Communist Party during the 1st plenary session of the 20th Central Committee of the Chinese Communist Party. Then, he was appointed as the Party Secretary of Beijing on November 13, 2022. Simultaneously, he is no longer serving as Secretary of the CCP Fujian Provincial Committee, having been superseded by Zhou Zuyi, the Minister of Human Resources and Social Security.

In December 2024, Yin met with Sanofi Chairman Frédéric Oudéa after the pharmaceutical company announced plans to invest $1.05 billion in Beijing. In the same month, Yin held a municipal work planning meeting, where he called on cadres to "thoroughly investigate and resolve disputes, and make every effort to maintain social stability". He also called on officials to take care of the people "with heart and affection", resolve urgent problems faced by the public, and also warned against industrial safety risks and natural disasters.

From February 19 to 22, 2025, at the behest of the Government of Singapore, Yin Li headed a CCP mission to Singapore and conferred with Prime Minister Lawrence Wong. From February 22 to 24, he led this CCP mission to Cambodia, where he conferred with Cambodian People's Party Chairman and Senate President Hun Sen, as well as Prime Minister Hun Manet.

Party political offices
Preceded by Cai Qi	Party Secretary of Beijing; 2022–incumbent	Incumbent
Preceded by Yu Weiguo	Party Secretary of Fujian; 2020–2022	Succeeded by Zhou Zuyi
Preceded by Ke Zunping	Deputy Party Secretary of Sichuan; 2015–2016	Succeeded by Liu Guozhong
Political offices
Preceded by Wei Hong	Governor of Sichuan; 2016–2020	Succeeded by Huang Qiang
Order of precedence
Preceded by Shi Taifeng as Member of the Politburo of the Chinese Communist Party	Order of precedence of China as Member of the Politburo of the Chinese Communist Party	Succeeded by Chen Wenqing as Member of the Politburo of the Chinese Communist Party
