= Yu Weiguo =

Chinese politician (born 1955)

- 于伟国

Party Secretary of Fujian
- In office 28 October 2017 – 30 November 2020
- Preceded by: You Quan
- Succeeded by: Yin Li

Governor of Fujian
- In office 26 November 2015 – 2 January 2018 (Acting until January 2016)
- Preceded by: Su Shulin
- Succeeded by: Tang Dengjie

Personal details
- Born: October 1955 (age 70–71) Wendeng, Shandong, China
- Party: Chinese Communist Party
- Education: Renmin University

Yu Weiguo (Chinese: 于伟国; born October 1955) is a Chinese politician who served as Party Secretary of Fujian. Prior to that he served as Deputy Party Secretary and Governor of Fujian, and Party Secretary of Xiamen.

== Biography ==
Yu was born in Wendeng, Shandong Province. Yu entered the work force as a chemical factory worker in Taicang, Jiangsu Province. He joined the Chinese Communist Party in October 1975. In 1979, shortly after the resumption of the National College Entrance Examination, Yu was admitted to the Chinese language department of Renmin University.

In 1983, he began working for the Secretariat of the Chinese Communist Party, then he began research on Deng Xiaoping theory. Starting in 1991 he served as a political staffer to Wang Zhen and Ding Guangen. In 1995 he was made Assistant to the Mayor of Xiamen, then in 2002 he was named deputy party secretary of Xiamen, and head of the Organization Department of Xiamen. In 2005, Yu was made deputy head, then head of the Organization Department of Fujian, and a member of the provincial Party Standing Committee; in 2009, he was named party secretary of Xiamen. He was known to be proactive in engaging the concerns of residents on the internet. As a direct result of online discussions, Yu was able to tackle a transit fare problem faced by city residents. In Xiamen, he worked with He Lifeng and Liu Cigui, both of whom were considered "political stars" who were later promoted. In April 2013, he was named deputy party secretary of Fujian.

In November 2015, Yu became the acting governor of Fujian; he became the oldest person to assume the post of Fujian Governor in some three decades, taking the office at the age of 60, which was the mandatory retirement age of sub-provincial level officials. This meant, effectively, that his 'political life' would be extended a further five years. In October 2017, he was appointed as the party secretary of Fujian.

In December 2020, Yu was appointed as the Deputy Chairperson of the National People's Congress Environment Protection and Resources Conservation Committee.

Yu is an alternate of the 18th Central Committee of the Chinese Communist Party and a member of the 19th Central Committee.

Government offices
Preceded by Su Shulin	Governor of Fujian; 2015–2018	Succeeded by Tang Dengjie
Party political offices
Preceded by You Quan	Party Secretary of Fujian; 2017–2020	Succeeded by Yin Li
Preceded by Chen Wenqing	Deputy Party Secretary of Fujian; 2013–2015	Succeeded by Ni Yuefeng
Preceded by He Lifeng	Party Secretary of Xiamen; 2009–2013	Succeeded by Wang Menghui
