= You Quan =

Chinese politician (born 1954)

- 尤权
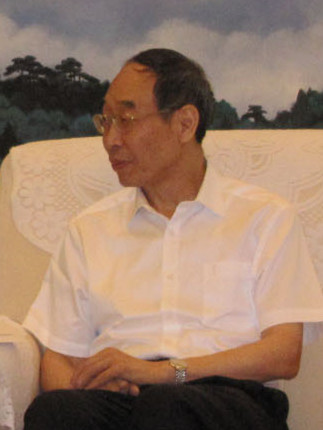

Head of the United Front Work Department
- In office 7 November 2017 – 27 October 2022
- Deputy: Zhang Yijiong → Chen Xiaojiang (Executive)
- General Secretary: Xi Jinping
- Preceded by: Sun Chunlan
- Succeeded by: Shi Taifeng

Party Secretary of Fujian
- In office 19 December 2012 – 28 October 2017
- Preceded by: Sun Chunlan
- Succeeded by: Yu Weiguo

Executive Deputy Secretary-General of the State Council
- In office 18 March 2008 – 18 December 2012
- Secretary-General: Ma Kai
- Preceded by: Zhang Ping
- Succeeded by: Xiao Jie

Chairman of the State Electricity Regulatory Commission
- In office 10 January 2007 – 18 December 2012
- Premier: Wen Jiabao
- Preceded by: Chai Songyue
- Succeeded by: Wang Xudong

Personal details
- Born: January 1954 (age 72) Beijing, China
- Party: Chinese Communist Party

You Quan (Chinese: 尤权; born January 1954) is a Chinese retired politician who was the head of the United Front Work Department and a secretary of the Secretariat of the Chinese Communist Party from 2017 to 2022. He previously served as Party Secretary of Fujian and chairman of Fujian People's Congress.

== Early life and education ==
You Quan was born in Beijing, but by Chinese convention he is considered a native of his ancestral home Lulong County, Hebei province. He attended Renmin University and graduated with a degree in economic planning in 1984. He also has a master's degree in economics from Renmin University which he received in 1987.

== Political career ==
You entered the work force in September 1969, and joined the Chinese Communist Party in March 1973. Starting in June 1995 he worked in the State Council of China, rising through the ranks to become chairman of the State Electricity Regulatory Commission in December 2006. In March 2008, he became a Deputy Secretary-General of the State Council, a minister-level post, working under Ma Kai.

In December 2012, You Quan was appointed the Party Committee Secretary of coastal Fujian province, succeeding Sun Chunlan who was transferred to Tianjin municipality. In February 2013, he acquired the additional position as chairman of Fujian People's Congress.

=== United Front Work Department ===
In 2017, You Quan was elevated to the Secretariat of the Chinese Communist Party and appointed Director of the United Front Work Department of the CCP Central Committee. You Quan was an alternate of the 17th Central Committee, and is a full member of the 18th and 19th Central Committees of the Chinese Communist Party.

In 2018, at a meeting with leaders of China's minority parties he emphasized their importance for external propaganda purposes and instructed part leaders to "talk about the 'China story' of multiparty cooperation."

==== Sanctions ====
On January 15, 2021, You Quan was designated by U.S. Department of State as connected with the National Security Law (NSL), pursuant to Executive Order (E.O.) 13936, "The President's Executive Order on Hong Kong Normalization", and added to OFAC's SDN List.

On 10 December 2024, Minister of Foreign Affairs of Canada Mélanie Joly announced Canada's sanctions against You and seven other government officials of Xinjiang and Tibet involved in serious human rights violations.

Party political offices
Preceded by Sun Chunlan	Head of the United Front Work Department; November 2017–October 2022	Succeeded by Shi Taifeng
Preceded by Sun Chunlan	Party Secretary of Fujian; December 2012 – October 2017	Succeeded by Yu Weiguo
Government offices
Preceded by Chai Songyue	Chairman of the State Electricity Regulatory Commission; December 2006 – April 2008	Succeeded by Wang Xudong
