= Chen Guangyi =

Chinese retired politician

- 陈光毅

Director of the Civil Aviation Administration of China
- In office December 1993 – June 1998
- Preceded by: Jiang Zhuping
- Succeeded by: Liu Jianfeng

Party Secretary of Fujian
- In office March 1986 – December 1993
- Preceded by: Xiang Nan
- Succeeded by: Jia Qinglin

Governor of Gansu
- In office April 1983 – March 1986
- Preceded by: Li Dengying
- Succeeded by: Jia Zhijie

Personal details
- Born: August 1933 (age 93) Putian, Fujian, China
- Party: Chinese Communist Party
- Education: Northeast China Engineering College

Chen Guangyi (Chinese: 陈光毅; born August 1933) was a Chinese politician. He served as Governor of Gansu, Party Secretary of Fujian, and Director of the Civil Aviation Administration of China. Under his leadership, Fujian achieved record economic growth that exceeded the national rate in the 20th century.

== Early life and career ==
Chen Guangyi was born in August 1933 in Putian, Fujian Province. After graduating from the Mechanical-Electrical Department of Northeast China Engineering College (now Northeastern University) in 1953, he began working as a technician at the Ministry of Metallurgy. He joined the Chinese Communist Party in 1959.

== Career in Gansu ==
By 1960 Chen was working in Gansu Province in Northwest China, serving as a deputy division head for the Heavy Industry Department of Gansu, and Director of the Production Office of the Northwest China Nonferrous Metallurgical Design Academy (1964–1975). In 1980 he was promoted to deputy director of the Gansu Provincial Planning Committee. In March 1983, he was promoted to Deputy Party Secretary of Gansu, and a month later, Governor of Gansu Province. As governor, he focused on poverty relief, soil erosion, and mining. He became a member of the 12th Central Committee of the Chinese Communist Party in September 1985.

== Career in Fujian ==
In March 1986, Chen was transferred to his home province of Fujian to serve as its Party Chief. It was said that Jia Qinglin, a northerner, was intended to replace the retiring party chief Xiang Nan, but because of opposition from Fujianese cadres, the top post of the province went to Chen Guangyi instead.

Chen's performance as the top leader of Fujian was mixed. Starting in 1988, there was an infusion of Taiwanese investment and a record level of economic growth and foreign investment. Chen also supported the Xiamen special economic zone and Deng Xiaoping's southern tour of 1992. He responded swiftly and effectively to the complaints, and throughout the rest of 1992, he worked with officials from Xiamen, Quanzhou, and Zhangzhou in southern Fujian on a strategy for growth. This resulted in strong performances in 1993, when Fujian had record economic growth which exceeded the national rate.

From January 1988 to January 1993, Chen Guangyi served as Chairman of the Fujian Provincial Committee of the Chinese People's Political Consultative Conference.

== National government ==
In 1993, Chen was appointed Director of the Civil Aviation Administration of China, and served in that position until 1998. After 1998, he mainly worked in the National People's Congress (NPC), serving as Chairman of the Financial and Economic Affairs Committee in the 9th NPC (1998–2003), and as Chairman of the Overseas Chinese Affairs Committee in the 10th NPC (2003–2008).

Chen was a member of the 12th to the 15th Central Committees of the Chinese Communist Party.
