= Chen Mingyi =

Chinese politician (born 1940)

Chen Mingyi (simplified Chinese: 陈明义; traditional Chinese: 陳明義; pinyin: Chén Míngyì; Pe̍h-ōe-jī: Tan Beng-gi; born August 1940) is a politician in the People's Republic of China. Chen was born in Fuzhou, Fujian Province. He joined the Chinese Communist Party in 1960. He graduated from the Department of Naval Architecture at Shanghai Jiaotong University, obtaining a master's degree.

After 1985, he became a member of standing committee of CCP's Fujian committee, vice secretary of CCP's Fujian committee and director of department of organization. From January to September 1993, he was the vice governor of Fujian Province. From April 1994 to October 1996, he was the Governor of Fujian province and the vice secretary of CCP's Fujian committee. From October 1996 to December 2000, he was the secretary of CCP's Fujian committee. After 2001, he became the chairman of Fujian political consultative conference.

He was an alternate member of CCP 12th, 13th and 14th central committee, and a member of CCP 15th central committee.

Political offices
Preceded by Jia Qinglin	Governor of Fujian; 1994–1996	Succeeded by He Guoqiang
Preceded by Jia Qinglin	Communist Party Secretary of Fujian; 1996–2000	Succeeded by Song Defu
