= Liao Zhigao =

Chinese politician (1913–2000)

Liao Zhigao (Chinese: 廖志高; Pe̍h-ōe-jī: Liau Chi-ko; May 20, 1913 – August 28, 2000) was a politician of the People's Republic of China. He was born in Mianning, Sichuan. He joined the Chinese Communist Party (CCP) in April 1934.

== Biography ==
In 1949 he was the secretary of CCP's Xikang committee, the governor of Xikang Province and the political commissar of provincial military region. After Sichuan and Xikang merged, he became the third secretary of CCP's Sichuan committee.

In February 1965, he became the first secretary of CCP's Sichuan committee.

He was persecuted at the beginning of Cultural Revolution in 1967, and stripped of all posts.

In November 1974, he re-merged and became the first secretary of CCP's Fujian committee, director of Fujian revolution commission, and the political commissar of Fuzhou military region. In August 1980, his half body was paralyzed due to stroke. In 1982, he was elected as a member of central advisory commission.

Liao was a member of 11th Central Committee of the Chinese Communist Party.
