= Qinghai Provincial Committee of the Chinese People's Political Consultative Conference =

Qinghai Provincial Committee of the Chinese People's Political Consultative Conference 中国人民政治协商会议青海省委员会
- 13th
- Emblem of the Chinese People's Political Consultative Conference

Type
- Type: United front organ Constitutional convention (Historical); Legislature (Historical) of Chinese People's Political Consultative Conference

History
- Founded: February 1955; 71 years ago
- Preceded by: Qinghai Provincial People's Congress Consultative Committee

Leadership
- Chairperson: Gönbo Zhaxi

Website
- www.qhszx.gov.cn

Chinese name
- Simplified Chinese: 中国人民政治协商会议青海省委员会
- Traditional Chinese: 中國人民政治協商會議青海省委員會
Transcriptions
Standard Mandarin
- Hanyu Pinyin: Zhōngguó Rénmín Zhèngzhì Xiéshāng Huìyì Qīnghǎishěng Wěiyuánhuì

Abbreviation
- Simplified Chinese: 青海省政协
- Traditional Chinese: 青海省政協
- Literal meaning: CPPCC Qinghai Provincial Committee
Transcriptions
Standard Mandarin
- Hanyu Pinyin: Qīnghǎishěng Zhèngxié

The Qinghai Provincial Committee of the Chinese People's Political Consultative Conference (Chinese: 中国人民政治协商会议青海省委员会; abbreviation CPPCC Qinghai Provincial Committee) is the provincial advisory body and a local organization of the Chinese People's Political Consultative Conference in Qinghai, China. It is supervised and directed by the Qinghai Provincial Committee of the Chinese Communist Party.

== History ==
The Qinghai Provincial Committee of the Chinese People's Political Consultative Conference traces its origins to the Qinghai Provincial People's Congress Consultative Committee (青海省各界人民代表会议协商委员会), founded in 1949.

== Term ==
=== 1st ===
- Term: June 1955–February 1959
- Chairperson: Gao Feng
- Vice Chairpersons: Zhou Renshan, A Recang, Ma Xingtai

=== 2nd ===
- Term: February 1959–December 1963
- Chairperson: Gao Feng
- Vice Chairpersons: Zhu Xiafu, Dan De'er, Ma Xingtai, Ji Chunguang (from April 1960–)

=== 3rd ===
- Term: December 1963–December 1977
- Chairperson: Yang Zhilin
- Vice Chairpersons: Ji Chunguang, Dan De'er, Songbu (from December 1965–), Xia Ronggabu (from December 1965–), Ma Letian (from December 1965–)

=== 4th ===
- Term: December 1977–April 1983
- Chairperson: Tan Qilong (–September 1979) → Zhaxi Wangxu (September 1979–November 1981) → Zhao Haifeng (November 1981–)
- Vice Chairpersons: Ji Chunguang, Guo Tingfan, Zhang Bai'an, Guo Ruozhen, Liu Chengyun, Xia Ronggabu, Ma Letian, Zheng Wenqing, Su Yaoliang, Gong Baojia, Liao Aiting, Fang Xin (from September 1979–), Zhou Long (from September 1979–), Zhou Chongde (from September 1979–), Sangre Jiacuo (from September 1979–), Sun Zengrong (from September 1979–), Du Hua'an (from November 1981–), Songbu (from November 1981–), Hao Huairen (from November 1981–), Dai Yaying (from November 1981–), Kang Jianxi (from November 1981–), Fu Shichun (from November 1981–)

=== 5th ===
- Term: April 1983–January 1988
- Chairperson: Shen Ling
- Vice Chairpersons: Fang Xin, Zhang Bai'an, Liao Aiting, Songbu, Dai Yaying, Fu Shichun, Huang Taixing, Xu Guangzong, Wang Fuxiang, Gu Jiasai, Han Shenggui, Xihouba (from July 1984–), Han Yingxuan (from July 1984–), Guanque (from April 1986–)

=== 6th ===
- Term: January 1988–January 1993
- Chairperson: Liu Feng
- Vice Chairpersons: Han Yingxuan, Chen Yunfeng, Liao Aiting, Songbu, Fu Shichun, Wang Fuxiang, Gu Jiasai, Han Shenggui, Guanque, Zhaxi Anjia, Jiaya

=== 7th ===
- Term: January 1993–January 1998
- Chairperson: Han Yingxuan
- Vice Chairpersons: Banma Danzeng (Resigned), Liao Aiting, Songbu, Gu Jiasai, Han Shenggui, Zhaxi Anjia, Cheng Buyun, Aga·Losang Tudan·Jiumei Jiacuo, Li Xihong, Ma Jinxiao, Ma Yuanbiao (from February 1995–), Zhuoma (from April 1996–)

=== 8th ===
- Term: January 1998–January 2003
- Chairperson: Han Yingxuan
- Vice Chairpersons: Cheng Buyun, Songbu, Han Shenggui, Aga·Losang Tudan·Jiumei Jiacuo, Li Xihong, Zhuoma, Cai Jule, Wang Xiaoyu, Ren Zhenyu, Yue Shishu

=== 9th ===
- Term: January 2003–January 2008
- Chairperson: Sanggyai Gya
- Vice Chairpersons: Cai Jule, Xun Xingcai, Han Shenggui, Wang Xiaoyu, Yue Shishu, Xi'na, Liu Guangzhong, Ma Fuhai, Bao Yizhi, Pu Wencheng, Renqing Anjie, Zhao Qizhong

=== 10th ===
- Term: January 2008–January 2013
- Chairperson: Baima
- Vice Chairpersons: Zhao Qizhong, Chen Ziquan, Xi'na, Bao Yizhi, Renqing Anjie, Li Zhongbao, Luo Chaoyang, Han Yugui, Ma Zhiwei, Ma Changqing
- Secretary-General: Wu Shengye

=== 11th ===
- Term: January 2013–January 2018
- Chairperson: Rinqên Gya
- Vice Chairpersons: Chen Ziquan, Luo Chaoyang, Bao Yizhi, Renqing Anjie, Ma Zhiwei, Ma Changqing, Li Xuansheng, Zhang Shoucheng, Ji Renfeng, Zongkang
- Secretary-General: Wang Jin

=== 12th ===
- Term: January 2018–January 2023
- Chairperson: Dorje Rabdain (–January 2022) → Gongbao Zhaxi (January 2022–)
- Vice Chairpersons: Wang Xiaoyong (–February 2021), Renqing Anjie, Ma Changqing, Zhang Shoucheng (–February 2021), Zongkang, Du Jie, Zhang Wenkui, Ma Haiying, Wang Xuan, Du Dezhi, Wang Zhenchang (from February 2021–), Zhang Xiaorong (from February 2021–), Ma Fengsheng (from February 2021–), Ma Jixiao (from January 2022–), Zhang Li (from January 2022–)
- Secretary-General: Wang Jin (–January 2020) → Liu Daye (January 2020–)

=== 13th ===
- Term: January 2023 –2028
- Chairperson: Gönbo Zhaxi
- Vice Chairpersons: Renqing Anjie, Kuang Yong, Wang Xuan, Wang Zhenchang, Zhang Xiaorong, Ma Fengsheng (–December 2024), Li Xiaonan, Tian Kui, Liu Daye, Saichi·Queji Luozhi Jiacuo, Ma Yuexiang
- Secretary-General: Liu Daye (–January 2024) → Xie Baoen (January 2024–)
