= Fujian Party School =

Chinese Communist Party training institute

The Party School of the Fujian Provincial Committee of the Chinese Communist Party (or Fujian Party School, Chinese: 中共福建省委党校) and the Fujian Institute of Administration (Chinese: 福建行政学院) under a "one institution with two names" framework), is the main educational institution for the Fujian Provincial Committee of the Chinese Communist Party and the Fujian Provincial People's Government.

== History ==
The school was founded in June 1950. The school's departments included literature, philosophy, political economy, and scientific socialism.

The school's campus spans 63,422 m^{2} (682,670 sq ft) and its floor space occupies more than 50,000 m^{2} (540,000 sq ft).

== Notable alumni ==
- Liu Ming, politician and former Secretary-General of the Fujian Provincial Committee of the Chinese People's Political Consultative Conference (CPPCC)
