= Dijing Jingwulue =

Book by Liu Tong

- Chinese: 帝京景物略
- Literal meaning: Survey of Scenery and Monuments in the Imperial Capital
Transcriptions
Standard Mandarin
- Hanyu Pinyin: dìjīng jǐngwù lüè
- Wade–Giles: ti-ching ching-wu lüeh
- IPA: [tî.tɕíŋ tɕìŋ.û lɥê]

Inside of a page of volume 5 of Dijing Jingwulue

The Dijing Jingwulue (Chinese: 帝京景物略) is a 17th-century Chinese prose classic written by Liu Tong, an official with a Jinshi degree and member of the Jingling school of Chinese prose literature.

Yu Yizheng (于奕正) and Zhou Sun (周损), two scholars outside of official circles were Liu's assistants who helped in compiling the book.

The preface reveals Liu as the actual author, while Yu was a compiler with Zhou acting as something of an assistant to the other two. However, Yu was a native of Beijing, capital of Ming dynasty China, and a scholar of local traditions. Liu may have just polished the prose, but gained most of the prestige. Liu dates the preface as 1635, the same year Yu died in Nanjing, three years before troops of the new dynasty attacked Beijing.

A celebration of a city's ambiance that would disappear behind the secluded walls of a conquered city, the work features descriptions of multiple gardens and estates that would soon vanish forever. Ming dynasty Beijing, in contrast with the later conservative Manchu Qing capital, was a city of gaiety and markets and fairs. Descriptions are given of Ming period fairs with literary men in pursuit of books, art objects and antiquities. Poetry is an integral part of the book and the authors portray a scholar in verse as finding nothing in his purse, but only able to twitch his own whiskers with his hopeful hand. Along with Ming period art that was treasured in its own day, there are descriptions of western paintings of Christ for sale. The Catholic cathedral is described and a judicious space is devoted to the Jesuit missionary Matteo Ricci. All of this was part of the diverse glory of the age. Seeming small and minor subjects loom large in the authors’ eyes such as the raising of crickets for the ubiquitous cricket fights of the era. Autumn mornings would find a horde of enthusiasts armed with bamboo tubes, cages and pots for the prey heading for abandoned temples with piles of old tiles and stones. At the heart of the classic was the realization of the flux of all things and the ultimate evanescence of human works and monuments in this world.

The Dijing Jingwulue is also notable for being the first text to mention that Jingwan, the founder of the Yunju Temple Stone Sutra project, was the student of Huisi, a patriarch of Tiantai Buddhism, though this almost a millennium after the events.
