= Teng Jiacai =

Chinese politician

- 滕佳材

Chairman of the Fujian Provincial Committee of the Chinese People's Political Consultative Conference
- Incumbent
- Assumed office January 2023
- Preceded by: Cui Yuying

Personal details
- Born: December 1964 (age 61) Andong County, Liaoning, China
- Party: Chinese Communist Party
- Education: Dongbei University of Finance and Economics

Teng Jiacai (Chinese: 滕佳材; pinyin: Téng Jiācái; born December 1964) is a Chinese politician, currently serving as chairman of the Fujian Provincial Committee of the Chinese People's Political Consultative Conference.

Teng was a member of the 19th and is a member of the 20th Central Commission for Discipline Inspection. He was a representative of the 19th National Congress of the Chinese Communist Party. He is a delegate to the 13th National People's Congress and is a member of the 14th National Committee of the Chinese People's Political Consultative Conference.

== Early life and education ==
Teng was born in Andong County (now Donggang), Liaoning, in December 1964. In 1982, he was accepted to Dongbei University of Finance and Economics, where he majored in the Department of Business Economics. He joined the Chinese Communist Party (CCP) in November 1985 upon graduation.

== Career ==
After university in 1986, Teng was assigned to the State Administration for Industry and Commerce. There, he was in turn deputy director of Consumer Rights Protection Department in March 2000, director of Consumer Rights Protection Department in August 2004, director-general of the General Office, and finally deputy director of the State Administration for Industry and Commerce in July 2012. He was briefly transferred to the position of deputy mayor of Changchun Municipal People's Government from November 2010 to July 2012.

In April 2013, Teng was made deputy director of the China Food and Drug Administration, but having held the position for only two years.

Teng was appointed secretary of Qinghai Provincial Commission for Discipline Inspection in April 2017 and was admitted to standing committee member of the CCP Qinghai Provincial Committee, the province's top authority. He concurrently served as director of the Qinghai Provincial Supervision Commission since January 2018.

Teng was transferred back to Beijing and chosen as leader of the Discipline Inspection and Supervision Group of the Central Commission for Discipline Inspection and the National Supervisory Commission stationed at the National Health Commission.

In January 2023, Teng took office as chairman of the Fujian Provincial Committee of the Chinese People's Political Consultative Conference, the provincial advisory body.

Party political offices
Preceded by Dorje Rabdain	Secretary of the Qinghai Provincial Commission for Discipline Inspection of the Chinese Communist Party; 2017–2021	Succeeded by Wang Yang
Political offices
New title	Director of the Qinghai Provincial Supervision Commission; 2018–2022	Succeeded by Wang Yang
Preceded by Ma Ben	Leader of the Discipline Inspection and Supervision Group of the Central Commission for Discipline Inspection and the National Supervisory Commission stationed at the National Health Commission; 2021–2023	Succeeded by Qu Xiaoli
Assembly seats
Preceded by Cui Yuying	Chairman of the Fujian Provincial Committee of the Chinese People's Political Consultative Conference; 2023–present	Incumbent
