= Decline of the Dharma =

Three divisions of time following Buddha's passing

The Decline of the Dharma or Ages of the Dharma, refers to traditional Buddhist accounts of how the Buddhist religion and the Buddha's teaching (Dharma) is believed to decline throughout history. It constitutes a key aspect of Buddhist eschatology and provides a cyclical model of history, beginning with a virtuous age where spiritual practice is very fruitful and ending with an age of strife, in which Buddhism is eventually totally forgotten. Buddhist accounts of this process culminate in the eventual arrival of Maitreya, the awaited Buddha of the future.

There are various accounts of this process of Dharma decline, which begins with Shakyamuni Buddha's death and continues throughout the generations as society and its knowledge of the Buddha's teachings decline over the centuries.

== Ages of the Dharma ==
There are different accounts of the decline of the Buddha's teaching (Buddha Dharma), i.e. Buddhism. These Buddhist accounts of longue durée history and temporal cosmology always assume a cyclical pattern of virtue and decline. In degenerate times, the current Buddha's teachings fall into disregard and are forgotten. In virtuous times a new Buddha will at some point be born to teach Dharma (usually considered to be millions of years in the future).

The teaching of the decline of the Dharma is found in early Buddhist sources. References to the decline of the Dharma over time can also be found in Mahayana sutras, including the Diamond Sutra and the Lotus Sutra.

Mahayanist and Nikaya (non-Mahayanist) sources all agree that our current time period is now on the downward slope of societal degeneration and that only after a period of strife and disaster will the cycle reverse to a period of gradual improvements. Different authors and traditions offer varying accounts of the timeline of decline.

=== Cakkavatti Sutta ===
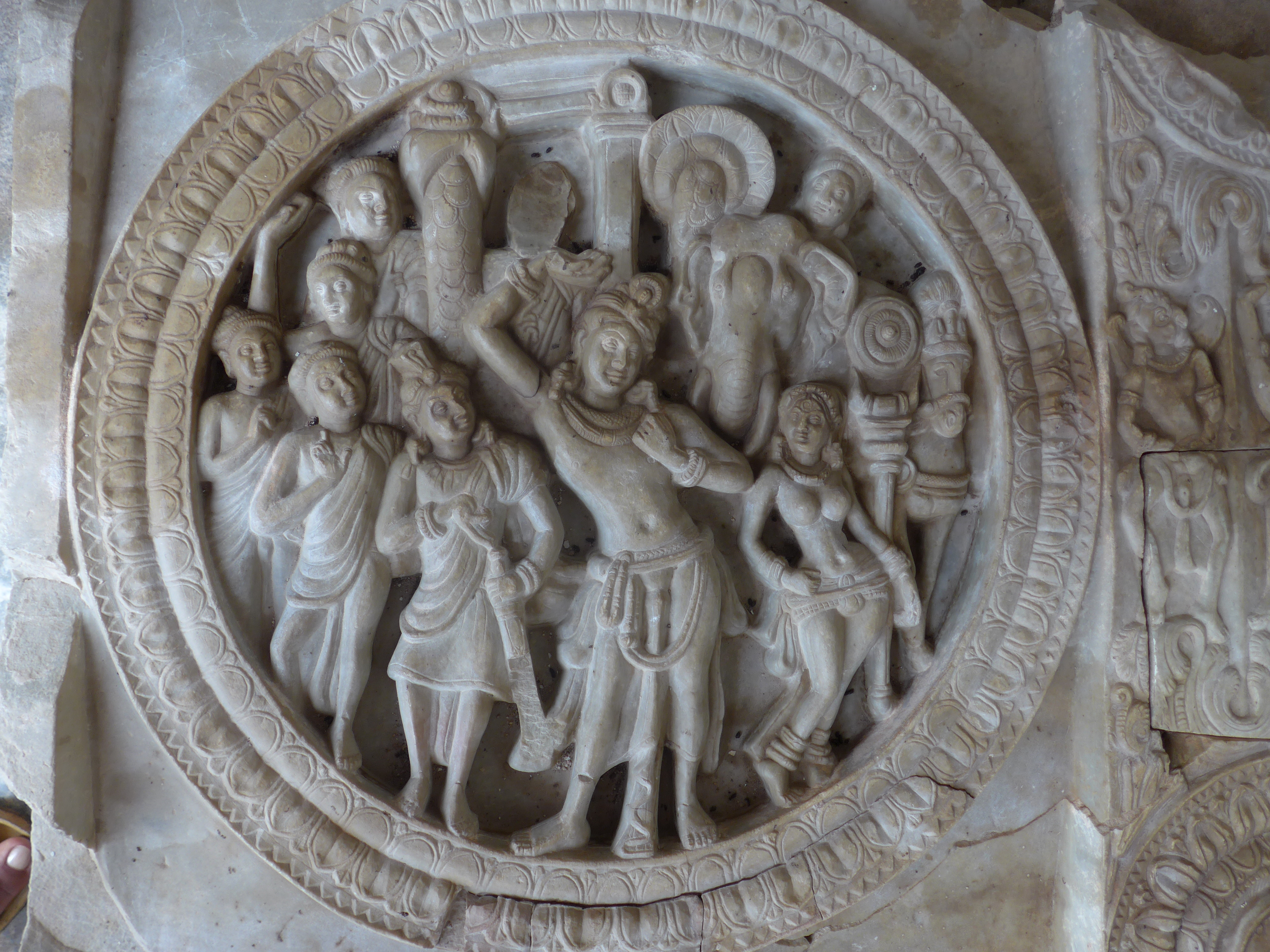
Detail of a sculpted railing at Phanigiri depicting a Chakravartin.

One of the earliest sources which contain a Buddhist discussion of historical decline is found in the Cakkavatti-Sīhanāda Sutta (Dīgha Nikāya 26) of the Pāli Canon (as well as in various parallel sources in other canons, like Dīrghāgama sutra number 6). The sutra recounts the story of a legendary universal monarch (Chakravarti) who lived far in the past. This king governed righteously and upheld the Dharma, ensuring peace and prosperity. Over time, successive kings neglect the Dharmic principles and fail to uphold the Dharma. They become greedy, unjust, and self-serving. Over time, societal values erode, leading to widespread poverty, crime, and moral decay. With each generation, human lifespan diminishes, reflecting the decline of moral and spiritual qualities. The sutra also describes how lifespan decreases from 80,000 years (when the "wheel turning" king ruled) to as little as 10 years during the peak of societal degeneration. In this bleak period, violence and lawlessness prevail, and society becomes increasingly fragmented and chaotic and people take refuge in caves to escape the fighting.

The sutra then describes a turning point in history. A few individuals retreat from the chaos, renouncing violence and embracing moral conduct. Their example inspires others to change, gradually restoring societal harmony. As moral conduct improves, human lifespan begins to increase again, and the conditions for prosperity and peace are reestablished by a new "wheel turning" king called Sankha. Eventually, the Buddha Metteyya (Maitreya) arrives. He is the next Buddha after Shakyamuni, who will teach the Dharma during a time of renewal. Under Metteyya’s guidance, people will again follow the path of virtue and wisdom, achieving liberation.

=== Theravada sources ===
The Vinaya (Monastic Rule) of the Theravada school (Cullavagga X, 1,6.) claims that the true Dharma will only last for 500 years. It states that the true Dharma (saddhamma) would have lasted longer (1000 years) if not for the admission of women into the monastic Sangha as bhikkunis. This claim also appears in the texts belonging to other Sthavira schools, including the Dharmaguptaka, Sarvastivada, and Mahisasaka schools but it does not appear in any single text surviving from the Mahasamghika school. As Nattier writers "Modern scholars have generally been reluctant to accept this pronouncement as representing the words of the Buddha, finding it more reasonable to assume that it emerged in misogynist circles sometime well after the Buddha's death." She also argues that since the claim is not found in any Mahasamghika works, this suggests the claim developed somewhat after the first schism.

The now standard view in the Theravada school is a timetable of decline lasting five thousand years. This schema was first taught in the works of the fifth century commentator Buddhaghosa. This time table is divided into five one thousand year periods. In each period, there is the disappearance of certain elements of the Dharma:

1. Disappearance of attainments (Pali: adhigama): In the first one thousand years, people gradually lose the ability to attain all the four stages of enlightenment.
2. Disappearance of the method (patipatti): In this period people gradually stop practicing meditation and keeping precepts properly.
3. Disappearance of learning (pariyatti): Gradually, the scriptures begin to be lost until all are lost at the end of this period.
4. Disappearance of signs (nimitta): monks abandon the robe and enter into secular life.
5. Disappearance of relics (dhatu): gradually the relics of the Buddha stop being worshiped and are lost.

=== Abhidharma ===
The Buddhist scholastic literature of the Abhidharma traditions provide more elaborate accounts of the various historical ages of the Dharma. The most influential such Abhidharma account in the northern tradition is found in Vasubandhu's Abhidharmakośabhāṣya. The text divides the cosmological history of the universe into four kalpas (a huge span of time), which is further divided into twenty antarakalpas (sub-eons). Each antarakalpa during the last kalpa of the universe is said to oscillate between periods of social and ethical growth and decline. The zenith of goodness is a time when human beings live 80,000 years and during the nadir, lifespans have shrunk to 10 years. During the zenith of moral progress, there is peace and abundance, while at the end, there is only war. This then oscillates back to a time of gradual improvement until a new Buddha arrives, and the cycle begins again.

=== In Mahayana sources ===
Various Mahayana sutras contain different accounts of the ages of the Dharma and the periods of Dharma decline. Both the Diamond Sutra and the Lotus Sutra contain mentions of a period of decline in the future, though these sutras do not provide explicit accounts of this idea. In one passage from the Diamond Sutra, Subhuti asks the Buddha if there will be any beings who will understand the teaching of the sutra "in the future time, in the latter age, in the latter period, in the latter five hundred years, when the True Dharma is in the process of decay." Similarly, the Lotus Sutra also mentions a period "after the Tathagata's parinirvana, in the latter age, in the latter period, in the latter five hundred years."

According to Edward Conze, the term "the last five hundred years" (paścimāyāṃ pañcaśatyām in Sanskrit) seems to assume a series of five-hundred-year periods, of which the "last five hundred years" is an age of decline. However, Nattier argues that this term was likely just referring to the five hundred years after the Buddha's parinirvana (physical death).

Some sutras contain different time tables however, the Mahayana Nirvana Sutra for example, mentions a period of seven hundred years, not five hundred. The passage states: "After seven hundred years have passed since my death, the True Dharma will be broken, decayed, and brought to ruin by sinful Māra." The sutra goes on to explain how even in the time of corruption, decline and decadence, the Buddhist community (sangha) will continue to exist for some time, even if many monks won't be living in the traditional way. The real danger of this period, according to the Nirvana Sutra, is that many people will reject the Mahayana sutras and the eternity of the Buddha, teaching that his death was final and that he was a mere mortal.

Another sutra which is related to the Nirvana Sutra focuses on the topic of the Final Age. The Sūtra of the Total Extinction of the Dharma (佛說法滅盡經) contains the following prophecy of the final period:

After my final nirvāṇa, when the Dharma is about to perish, in the evil world of the five heinous crimes, the paths of Māra will flourish. Māras will become ascetics and disrupt my path. They will wear worldly clothes but delight in monastic robes of five colors. They will drink wine, eat meat, kill living beings, crave flavors, have no compassionate hearts, and harbor hatred and jealousy toward one another.

Other sutras mention a time of one thousand years. The Bhadrakalpika Sutra for example, states "The true Dharma (saddharma) will last for five hundred years, and likewise the semblace of the true Dharma (saddharma-pratirūpaka)." This one thousand year timetable is also found in other sources like the Dazhidulun. Still other sutras, like the Candragarbha Sutra of the Great Collection, have a timetable of 1,500 years, with the true Dharma lasting for 500 years and the age of the "semblance of the true dharma" (saddharma-pratirupaka) lasting for a thousand years.

==== Candragarbha Sutra ====
The Candragarbha Sutra (Ch: Yuezangfen 月藏分, "Moon Treasury Section") of the Mahāsaṃnipāta Sūtra is a key source for the doctrine of Dharma decline. There are different editions of this text. One of these provides a different schema of five five-hundred year periods (五五百歳, Chinese: wǔ wǔ bǎi sùi; Japanese: go no gohyaku sai), each of which is less ideal for practicing Buddhism than the last. This schema, which covers a span of 2,500 years was also very influential in East Asian Buddhism and it was widely quoted and relied upon by Chinese and Japanese authors.

These five ages are:

1. The true Dharma age, in which Buddhist believers resolutely cultivate wisdom and achieve liberation.
2. The age in which Buddhists can resolutely practice meditation.
3. The age in which Buddhists resolutely study, recite, listen to and learn the teachings.
4. The age in which Buddhists focus on building temples, stupas and undertake repentance.
5. The age of decline, in which the Dharma has diminished and believers quarrel with each other.

The fifth and last age of decline is one in which the people would be incapable of practicing the Buddha's Dharma. Eventually the Buddhist teachings would be totally lost, leading to the need for a new Buddha to be born in the world. This time period would also be characterized by unrest, strife, famine, and natural disasters.

The Candragrabha Sutra describes the era of Dharma Decline as follows:

In [the final] two hundred years, even monks will not practice in accordance with the True Dharma. They will seek worldly profit and fame; their compassion will be meagre, and they will not live according to the precepts (siksa). They will put down those who do practice in accordance with the True Dharma, and will cast aspersions upon them. They will steal [their] valuables and necessities. Relying on assassins of worldly kings, they will grasp at the kingdom. Acting as the king's messengers, they will go about seeking profit. They will sow discord between kings and their subjects, and will search for ways to trade and make a profit. Even those who do practice the True Dharma will not do so having truly taken it to heart. [Rather,] they will occupy themselves with all sorts of frivolous talk, casual activities, and playful vacuities. At that time all the gods and nagas who delight in the Dharma will abandon the land where the monks of the kingdom act in such a way, and will not remain, and the party of those who obstruct the Dharma —the party of Mara and so on —will arise there, and their power and strength will increase. Kings, ministers, and so on will decline in faith; they will no longer perceive the distinction be tween virtue and vice, and they will do harm to the True Dharma. They will make use of the treasures of the Three Jewels and the goods of the sangha and will steal them, and they will not shrink from sin. They will gradually destroy images and stupas, and the goods [used for] worship will diminish. At that time there will remain a few monks and householders who will practice the True Dharma without error...

=== Three ages in East Asian Buddhism ===
In East Asian Buddhism, the most influential schema used to explain the decline of the Dharma is one of three ages of Dharma. This schema was formulated by Chinese authors out of the various different accounts found in the sutras and is not found in any specific Mahayana sutra in a systematic fashion. These three divisions of time following Buddha's passing are:

1. Age of the Right Dharma (Chinese: 正法; pinyin: zhèng fǎ; Japanese: shōbō, Sanskrit: saddharma-kāla), also known as Former Period of the Dharma. This refers to the first thousand years (or 500 years depending on the source) during which the Buddha's disciples are able to uphold the Buddha's teachings and it is possible to attain enlightenment.
2. Age of the Semblance Dharma (Chinese: 像法; pinyin: xiàng fǎ; Japanese: zōhō, Sanskrit: saddharma-pratirūpaka-kāla), also known as Middle Period of the Dharma. This is the second thousand years (or 500 years), which only "resembles" true Dharma. It is a "reflection" (pratirūpaka) of the right Dharma. A few people might be able to attain enlightenment during this time, but most people just follow the forms of the religion.
3. Last Age of the Dharma (Chinese: 末法; pinyin: mò fǎ; Japanese: mappō) or Final Age (末世 mòshì, Sanskrit: paścima-kāla), which is to last for 10,000 years during which the Dharma declines. At this time, the spiritual capacities of human beings is at a low point and traditional religious practices lose their effectiveness, while the teaching and the scriptures slowly disappear.

There is a passage from the Mahayana Abhisamaya Sutra (Taisho no. 839) which contains the idea of three ages used together in one passage which states: "The Tathagata manifests himself and descends from the Tusita Heaven to uphold the entire True Dharma (zhèng fǎ), the entire Semblance Dharma (xiàng fǎ), and the entire Final Dharma (mò fǎ)." However, as Nattier notes, this sutra was translated after the concept of the three ages was already adopted into Chinese Buddhism, so it cannot be the main source of the idea.

Nanyue Huisi (515-577), the third Patriarch of the Tiantai school, was the first Chinese author to present the three ages schema. The theory first appears in his Lì Shì Yuàn Wén (立誓願文, T. 46). Soon, the idea was adopted by numerous scholars. Jizang (549–622 CE), an author of the Chinese Madhyamaka school, writes in his commentary on the Lotus Sutra (Fahua yishu 法華義疏):

Generally speaking, Dharma can be divided into four periods. First is when the Buddha was in the world. Second is when the Buddha died; during this time, Dharma’s prestige did not change, so this period is called zhengfa. Third is a long time after the Buddha had died. Dharma was replaced by misconceptions, and this period is called the xiangfa. The fourth period is when Dharma has been distorted and only a sliver of it remains; this period is called the mofa.

=== In Tibetan Buddhism ===
Tibetan Buddhism generally follows a four age model, similar to the Hindu concept of the four yugas. The first is a virtuous age, and the following ages progressively decline in terms of the five degenerations (kaṣāya): lifespans decrease, defilements increase, beings (physical and intellectual capacities of people decrease), times (wars and famines and other disasters increase), views (false beliefs proliferate).

The four ages in this schema (which match the Hindu theory of four yugas) are:

1. The age of completeness (Sanskrit: kṛta-yuga), a time of mostly virtue and goodness.
2. The age of three-quarters (tretā-yuga), in which the degenerations begin
3. The age of two-quarters (dvāpara-yuga), in which the degenerations increase further.
4. The age of strife or the degenerate age (Sanskrit: kali-yuga, Tibetan: nyigme dü), a time in which the degenerations become the worst, and murder and other forms of evil become very common.

Tibetan Buddhist views are also informed by the Buddhist tantric literature. The Kalacakra Tantra is an influential Buddhist tantra which contains an extensive prophecy of the future decline and revival of the Dharma. The view of the four eras and the idea that we are currently in the fourth degenerate era but must preserve and maintain the teachings of the kṛta-yuga was used by various Tibetan authors to promote their own tradition as upholding the kṛta teachings of the past. One example is Dolpopa, who saw himself as upholding the complete kṛta Dharma during the current degenerate age.

== Causes ==
Buddhist sources contain numerous accounts of the reasons and causes for the degeneration of the Dharma. Some of these causes are caused by external forces, such as invasions and persecution by non-buddhists. Other accounts place the blame on Buddhists, who weaken the religion from within either due to having heretical views, or due to laxity in conduct and meditation, carelessness or other moral failings.

A classic passage comes from the Saṃyutta Nikāya, which states:

There are five dhammas of decline that are conducive to the corruption and disappearance of the True Dhamma. Which five? It is when monks, nuns, laymen and laywomen are irreverent and unruly toward the teacher (sat-thar, i.e., the Buddha), are irreverent and unruly toward the Dhamma, are irreverent and unruly toward the Sangha, are irreverent and unruly toward the training (sikkhas), and are irreverent and unruly toward meditational absorption (samadhi).

Anguttara Nikaya 2.1.2.10 states:

Bhikkhus, there are two main reasons for the destruction and disappearance of the Buddha Sāsana in future. The first is to use the incorrect and inappropriate words in those respective languages to deliver the teachings. The second is to use wrong meanings and incorrect clarifications.

Other passages mention quarrels and sectarian divisions within the Sangha as a major element of Dharma decline, as well as the development of a false or "counterfeit" Dharma.

Regarding actions of non-Buddhists, most sources mention foreign invaders and also the actions of powerful states as causes for the decline of the Dharma. As to the issue of state regulation, the Humane Kings Sutra mentions that state restrictions on monastic ordinations, stupa building and the crafting of images will lead to further decline.

== Responses to the age of decline ==
While the teaching of the decline of the Dharma is found in all Buddhist traditions, they don't all agree on what to do about it. Different traditions interpret and respond to this teaching in various ways. Jan Nattier and Mark Blum write that there were two main types of responses to the challenge of Dharma decline:

1. A conservative approach which focuses on redoubling our efforts to preserve the teachings and to try harder to follow the traditional Buddhist practices. This approach is the standard one in Theravada Buddhism and in Indo-Tibetan Buddhism. It was also adopted by some East Asian traditions and authors, who emphasized strict monastic discipline (following the Vinaya) and strict ascetic practices in mountain or forest monasteries far away from society. In its most extreme form, this approach may even completely reject the idea of Dharma decline, interpreting the sutras' statements on it as mere motivational talk.
2. The opposite response, which sees most or all traditional Buddhist practices as unsuitable for the current age of decline. This approach often entails a kind of Buddhist "dispensationalism" which argues that since we find ourselves in an unprecedented age, one should focus on special practices which are specifically useful for this time. This view also de-emphasizes or even abandons traditional practices like the monastic rule (Vinaya). This is the position of Chinese Pure Land authors like Daochuo and Japanese figures like Hōnen and Nichiren.

=== Chinese Buddhism ===
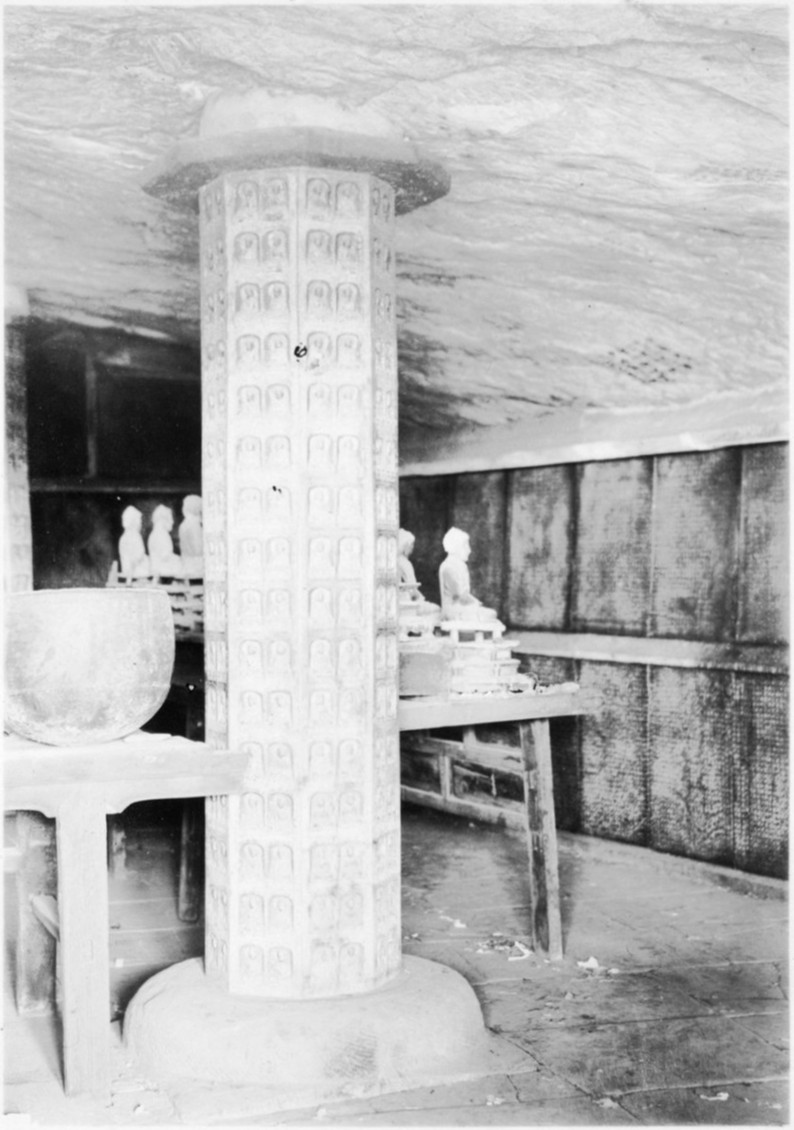
The Interior of the Yunju Temple Caves (Zhili Fangshan) contain hundreds of stone carved scriptures, one of the treasures of Chinese epigraphy. Since the time of Jingwan, numerous monks from Sui, Tang, and Liao dynasties dedicated their efforts to this work as a way to preserve the teachings during the time of Dharma decline.

The ages of Dharma is an important teaching in East Asian Mahayana. The teaching of Dharma decline became quite influential in China during the Northern Dynasties period and its influence continued well into the Sui and Tang eras. The attitude that the final age was near was influenced by the persecutions of Buddhism by Emperor Taiwu and Emperor Wu, as well as news of the invasions of the Hepthalites into India and their destruction of Buddhist sites.

The idea that China had entered the era of Dharma decline soon became a key teaching for several forms of early Chinese Buddhism, such as for the now defunct Three Stages school. Another early conservative figure was Daoxuan (596-667), who held that the best response to the era of decline was closely following the Vinaya. The idea of Dharma decline or mofa also led the monk Jingwan (540–639) to begin the project of carving numerous sutras on rock. Jingwan's followers continued this project for generations, creating the Fangshan stone sutras.

The teaching of Dharma decline was also important in the Lotus Sutra schools who believe that different Buddhist teachings are skillful and useful in each period due to the different capacities of the people living in different ages. Since the time of Nanyue Huisi (515-577), the idea of Dharma decline has been a part of the Tiantai school.

The doctrine of Dharma decline also became central to Pure Land Buddhism. Pure Land Buddhist authors held that we had entered the degenerate age, which means that the "path of sages" which relies on discipline and meditation, was no longer effective. Pure Land Buddhist therefore attempt to attain rebirth into the Pure Land of Amitābha, where they can practice the Dharma more readily.

The first figure to teach the Pure Land view of the age of Dharma decline was patriarch Daochuo (562–645), who writes:

That is why it is stated in the Yuezang section of the Ta-chi Ching (大集月藏經): ‘In our age of Dharma decline, even though countless sentient beings may cultivate the path through practice, not one will attain it.’ This age now is the era of Dharma decline, and a corrupted world of the five defilements is now manifest. The gate to the Pure Land is the only path by which people may reach [enlightenment].

Following Daochuo, other Pure Land authors like Shandao, adopted this idea, arguing that in this final age, only the Pure Land Dharma Gate was efficacious, since it relied on the other-power of Buddha Amitabha's past vows. Other paths relied on self-power, and thus could no longer be effective in the age of degeneration.

=== Japanese Buddhism ===
Saichō, the Japanese founder of Tendai (the Japanese branch of Tiantai), wrote about the idea of Dharma decline (Jp: mappō), explaining how certain Tendai teachings were well suited for this time. In particular, Saichō argued that monks should retreat to the mountains to meditate. Drawing on passages in the Lotus Sutra which mention how it will be taught during the time of decline, Saichō also argued that his time (which he held was close to the arrival of the age of decline) was just the right time for the Tendai Lotus teaching. As he writes in his Shugo kokkaisho:

Now men's faculties have all changed. There is no one with Hinayana faculties. The Period of the True and of the Imitated Dharma have almost passed, and the age of mappō is extremely near. Now is the time for those with faculties suitable for the Lotus Ekayana teaching.

Saichō also argued that during this time it would become more and more difficult to keep the monastic Vinaya precepts and eventually the monastic precepts would disappear. He saw the corruption of the monks at the capital of Nara as an example of the degeneration of the Dharma. As such, he focused on the bodhisattva precepts instead of on the Vinaya. Saichō also criticized the state bureaucracy which controlled the Buddhist schools in Japan at the time as another contributor to Dharma decline.

Other Japanese figures also adopted these idea. The Tendai scholar Genshin for example, writes in the preface to his influential Ōjōyōshū (Essentials for Birth [in the Pure Land]) how he composed the work to help common people attain birth in the Pure Land:

Teachings and practices in order to be born in the Pure Land are the most important things in this Final Age of defilements (jokuse matsudai 獨世末代). Who, either among monks or laymen, noblemen or commoners, is not going to follow this way? But many are the Buddhist teachings, esoteric and exoteric, which aren’t necessarily the same. Many are the practical and the theoretical ways of meditation on Buddha and on his Pure Land. Wise people, excellent people, earnest in their devotion, won’t find any difficulty to undertake these practices, but for a foolish being like myself, how is it possible to bear them? Therefore I assembled important passages from holy scriptures and Buddhist treatises elucidating the practice of nenbutsu.

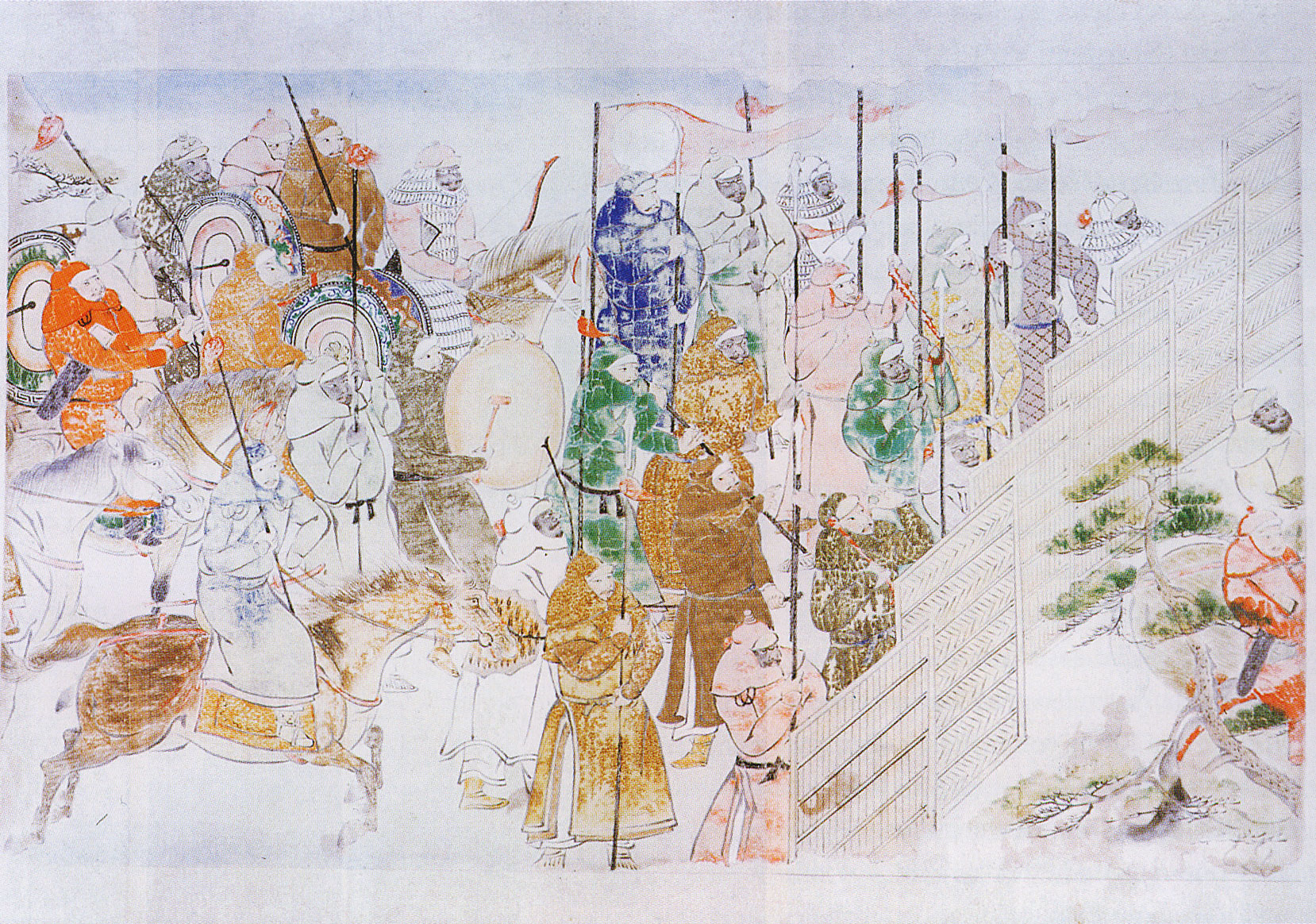
Japanese illustration of Mongol soldiers. The Mongol threat and their attempted invasions of Japan had an effect on the public consciousness of the Kamakura period. A sense of chaos and decline was palpable.

Genshin's writing helped popularize the idea that the world had entered the age of Dharma decline. By the Kamakura Period (1185 to 1333), numerous Japanese Buddhist figures saw the strife and corruption of this historical period as a sign of the age of decline. Indeed, much of Japanese Buddhism during this era is concerned with the question of how to be a Buddhist in the time of decline. The Kamakura period saw the rise of the new Pure Land Buddhist schools like Jōdo-shū and Jōdo Shinshū founded by Hōnen and Shinran respectively. These new traditions stressed a total reliance on Amitabha Buddha's grace as the only possible solution to the age of decline.

Hōnen's Pure Land teaching differentiates itself from its Chinese predecessors due its exclusivism. According to Hōnen, with the exception of the nembutsu (the "easy" path of simply reciting the Buddha's name), all other Buddhist practices are incapable of leading to awakening in this age. This is because the faculties of people in this age of decline are too inferior for other practices. The simple practice of saying the Buddha's name meanwhile, is easy and is universally accessible to all people.

Nichiren Buddhism, founded by Nichiren at around the same time, similarly uses the Dharma decline teaching in an exclusive sense to argue that only its own teaching of Lotus Sutra devotion (through the chanting of the sutra's title, the daimoku) is effective during this era. For Nichiren, the only solution to Dharma decline was for the Imperial government to embrace the Lotus Sutra and ban all other Buddhist sects. Only when this was done would Japan become a beacon of Dharma for the world, spreading the true Dharma and reversing the age of decline throughout the whole world.

In contrast to these figures, some Japanese authors like Myōe and Jōkei argued that it was precisely the abandonment of traditional buddhist practice and monastic discipline which caused the age of decline. As such, they advocated strict monastic discipline and adherence to traditional practices as a way to stem the tide of decline.

The Zen schools had different attitudes to the idea, though they all promoted zazen as the main solution. Eisai (1141–1215), founder of Rinzai Zen, wrote that zazen could be practiced by all people, even those of lesser faculties. He argued that those who single mindedly practiced zazen would all attain the way, even those "ignorant people of the last age". He also wrote:

The Prajñā, Lotus and Nirvana Sutras all teach the meditational practice of zazen for the last age. If it did not suit the people’s capacity in these latter days, the Buddha would not have taught this. For this reason, the people of the great Sung [Dynasty] nation avidly practice Zen. They err, who, in ignorance of zazen, hold that Buddhism has fallen into decline.

Dōgen (1200-1253) meanwhile fully rejects the theory of Dharma decline, adamantly promoting the practice of zazen as useful at all times and writing:

The doctrinal schools emphasizing names and appearances distinguish between the True, Counterfeit, and Final Dharma Ages, but in True Mahayana [Zen] we find no such distinction. It teaches that all who practice will attain the Way.

As such, his teaching was in sharp contrast to other Kamakura era Buddhists who promoted the theory of decline.

== Saviors of the degenerate age ==
While the coming of the decline of Dharma and the age of strife is certainly a time which Buddhists looked upon with trepidation, the various narratives also provided some hope. This came in the shape of Buddhist savior figures which could help people through these difficult times.

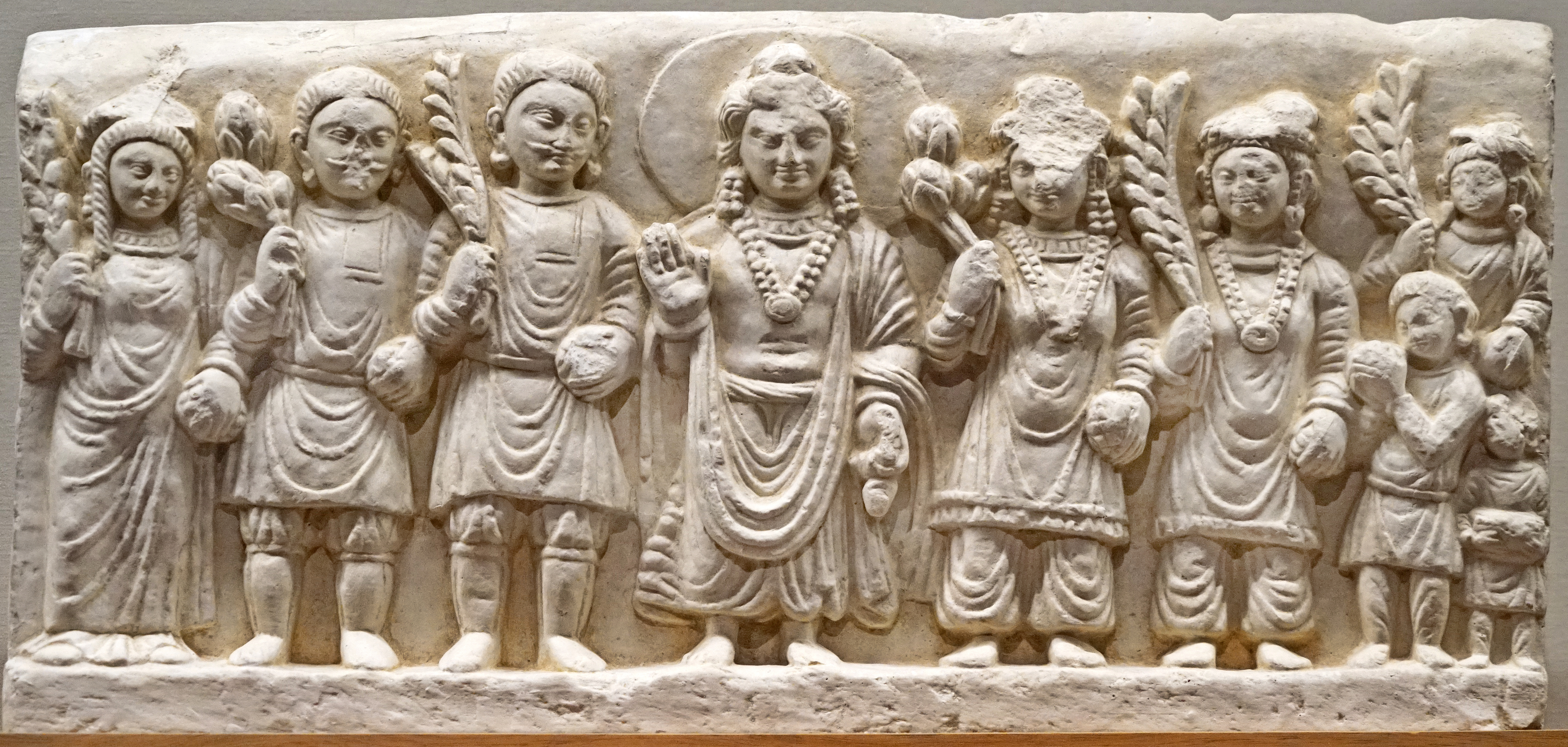
Relief of Maitreya surrounded by devotees, Kushan or Kidarite, Hadda, Afghanistan.

Traditionally, the most important figure who is held to herald the end of the degenerate age is the future Buddha Maitreya (Pali: Metteya). In both Mahayana and Theravada Buddhism, devotion to Maitreya and cultivation of meritorious actions is said to help a person be reborn in a place and time that would allow them to meet Maitreya. This could refer to Maitreya's current abode in Maitreya's inner court in Tushita or to the time in the future when Maitreya arrives on earth. In Chinese Buddhism, Maitreya was also a major figure. While traditionally it is held that Maitreya's arrival is far in the future, when the Dharma has all but disappeared, some Chinese millenarian figures and sects claimed that Maitreya's arrival was imminent.

Apart from Maitreya, there are also kingly figures associated with the future Chakravartin king who will usher in the future golden age. In some sources, this king is named Sankha and he is seen as someone who will unite the world, rule virtuously and promote virtue. This occurs just before the descent of Maitreya. Tibetan Buddhism, influenced by the Kalacakra Tantra, has a more elaborate lore, which teaches about a future king named Kalki, who rules a virtuous Buddhist kingdom called Shambala. He is also seen as someone who will defeat non-Buddhist barbaric invaders (mlecchas) in a great war. This myth is likely borrowed from Hindu myths of the Kalki avatar.

In Mahayana, certain other figures are also venerated as saviors who offer guidance, protection, and liberation during the degenerate age. One prominent savior figure is Amitābha, central to Pure Land Buddhism. Amitābha vowed to create a pure peaceful realm, Sukhāvatī, where beings could be reborn through faith in him. This provides an accessible path to liberation for all, bypassing the challenges of the degenerate age by allowing them to escape this world and be reborn in the pure land. Avalokiteśvara Bodhisattva is also seen as a savior figure, offering immediate assistance to those in distress and physical danger.

Kṣitigarbha (Ch: Dizang) is also known for his vow to take responsibility for the instruction of all beings in the six worlds, in the era between the death of Gautama and the rise of Maitreya. Various sutras which focus on Kṣitigarbha, such as the Ten Wheels Sutra, mention the bodhisattva Dizang in connection to the era of Dharma decline. The Ten Wheels Sutra (T. 410) hails Dizang as a savior of the "vile age of the five turbulences [in] the world without a Buddha". This scripture was central to the Three Stages Sect in China.

In the Lotus Sutra, Viśiṣṭacāritra is entrusted to spread Buddhist dharma in the age of Dharma decline and save mankind and the earth. He and countless other bodhisattvas, specifically called Bodhisattvas of the Earth (of which he is the leader), vow to be reborn in a latter day to re-create Buddhist dharma, thus turning the degenerate age into a flourishing paradise. Gautama Buddha entrusts them instead of his more commonly known major disciples with this task since the Bodhisattvas of the Earth have had a karmic connection with Gautama Buddha since the beginning of time, meaning that they are aware of the Superior Practice which is the essence of Buddhism or the Dharma in its original, pure form.

== In other religions ==
Some Chinese folk religions borrow the idea of the final age of Dharma from Buddhism. Some Chinese religions even teach that the three ages were associated with Buddhist figures like Dīpankara, Gautama Buddha, and Maitreya. Chinese salvationist religions are particularly focused on this idea, and they often promote themselves as teachings which are just right for the current age of decline since they can provide a path to salvation.

Falun Gong teaches its own version of the "Dharma-ending period". Its founder and leader, Li Hongzhi, teaches an "end time" involving the destruction and subsequent renewal of civilization, and views the present era as a perilous final period, referred to as the "last havoc" marked by extreme moral decline. Li describes this as a critical spiritual crisis in which human corruption risks the destruction of civilization, while teaching that followers can be saved through practicing Falun Dafa. Li claimed that that hundreds of thousands or even millions of years ago, there were civilisations that were very advanced technologically but that because they abandoned their morals, the "Awakened Ones" ordered their destruction and all their science and technology ceased to exist. According to Li, human civilization has already been completely destroyed 81 times, with only a few people surviving each time to rebuild civilization. Li also claims there is archeological evidence to support the existence of highly advanced prehistoric civilizations, including a French discovery of a 2 billion-year-old natural nuclear fission reactor in Africa.
