= Gönbo Zhaxi =

Chinese politician

- མགོན་པོ་བཀྲ་ཤིས་

Chairman of the Qinghai Provincial Committee of the Chinese People's Political Consultative Conference
- Incumbent
- Assumed office 24 January 2022
- Preceded by: Dorje Rabdain

Personal details
- Born: October 1962 (age 63–64) Hualong Hui Autonomous County, Qinghai, China
- Party: Chinese Communist Party
- Education: Qinghai Vocational and Technical College of Animal Husbandry and Veterinary Medicine; Hunan University

Gönbo Zhaxi (Tibetan: མགོན་པོ་བཀྲ་ཤིས་, Wylie: mgon po bkra shis; Chinese: 公保扎西; pinyin: Gōngbǎo Zhāxī; born October 1962) is a Chinese politician of Tibetan ethnicity, currently serving as chairman of the Qinghai Provincial Committee of the Chinese People's Political Consultative Conference.

He was an alternate of the 18th Central Committee of the Chinese Communist Party. He was a member of the 12th, 13th and 14th National Committee of the Chinese People's Political Consultative Conference.

== Early life and education ==
Gönbo Zhaxi was born in Hualong Hui Autonomous County, Qinghai, in October 1962. In 1974, he entered Huangyuan Livestock School, where he majored in animal husbandry and veterinary medicine. He earned his MBA degree from Hunan University in 1996.

== Career ==
After graduation in 1978, Gönbo Zhaxi became a technician at Qinghai Livestock and Veterinary Science Research Institute.

In September 1981, Gönbo Zhaxi studied at the Minzu University of China, and worked there the next year. In December 1986, he was transferred to the Organization Department of the Chinese Communist Party, where he mainly served as a secretary.

In November 1996, Gönbo Zhaxi was transferred to Tibet Autonomous Region and appointed deputy party secretary of Shigatse. In March 2000, he became deputy party secretary of Nagqu Prefecture, rising to party secretary in September of the same year. In April 2003, he was appointed party secretary of Lhasa, a post he kept for three years.

Gönbo Zhaxi was appointed head of the United Front Work Department of the CCP Qinghai Provincial Committee in September 2006 and a month later was admitted to member of the CCP Qinghai Provincial Committee, the province's top authority. He served as vice chairman of the Qinghai Provincial Committee of the Chinese People's Political Consultative Conference in January 2012, and ten years later promoted to the chairman position.

Party political offices
Preceded by Yang Jun	Communist Party Secretary of Nagqu Prefecture; 2000–2003	Succeeded by Duotuo
Preceded by Qiangba Puncog	Communist Party Secretary of Lhasa; 2003–2006	Succeeded by Qin Yizhi
Preceded by Pasang Dondrup	Head of the United Front Work Department of the Tibet Regional Committee of the Chinese Communist Party; 2006	Succeeded by Losang Jamcan
Preceded by Jin Shubo	Secretary of the Working Committee of the Organizations Directly under the Tibet Autonomous Region Committee of the Chinese Communist Party; 2006–2011	Succeeded by Deng Xiaogang
Preceded by Jin Shubo	Secretary-General of the Tibet Autonomous Regional Committee of the Chinese Communist Party; 2006–2011	Succeeded by Deng Xiaogang
Preceded by Che Dalha	Head of the United Front Work Department of the Tibet Regional Committee of the Chinese Communist Party; 2011–2016	Succeeded by Tangod
Preceded by Tangod	Head of the United Front Work Department of the Qinghai Provincial Committee of the Chinese Communist Party –	Succeeded by Baiko
Assembly seats
Preceded by Dorje Rabdain	Chairman of the Qinghai Provincial Committee of the Chinese People's Political Consultative Conference; 2022–present	Incumbent
