= Sanjiejiao =

Buddhist religious movement

The Sanjiejiao (Chinese: 三階教 "Three degrees religion") or Pufazong (普法宗 "Popular faith religion") was a religious movement based on the teachings of the Chan Buddhist monk Xinxing (信行, 540–594).

== Teachings ==
Xinxing taught that in the last of the Three Ages of Buddhism, Buddhists must learn all the Buddhist teachings. He taught tapas (ascetic practices), begging for food, eating only one meal daily, worshiping all living things as Buddhas based on the doctrine of the Buddha-nature, building public charity "treasure houses" (無盡藏院) for monastics and laypeople alike, and sky burial upon death.

== History ==
Based in Hua Du monastery (化度寺) in Chang'an, the movement was very popular in 600-700 CE. The monks lived in the Sanjiejiao house, or Sanjieyuan (三階院) inside Buddhist monasteries and built endless treasure houses. Its practices faced heavy criticism from many Buddhists and restriction by Buddhist Emperor Wen of Sui and Wu Zetian as unorthodox teachings. Emperor Xuanzong of Tang ordered the destruction of the Wujinzangyuan, the Sanjieyuan and the school's texts, sparing only the treasure houses. Bhikkhuni Zongjing (總靜) in the Zhixin monastery(直心寺) was a known practitioner who died in 831. Some texts, such as part of the three stages teachings (三階教法) were preserved in Japanese monasteries. Some were also found in Dunhuang texts and grottoes.

== See also ==
- San Jiao

== Readings ==
- 矢吹慶輝 (Yabuki Keiki), 三階教の研究 (Sangaikyō no kenkyū) (Studies on the Teaching of the Three Stages). Tokyo: Iwanami shoten, 1927.
- 西本照真 (Nishimoto Teruma), 三階教の研究 (Sangaikyō no kenkyū). Tokyo: 春秋社(Shunjusha), 1998.
- Hubbard, Jamie, Absolute Delusion, Perfect Buddhahood: The Rise and Fall of a Chinese Heresy. University of Hawaii Press, 2001.
- Hubbard, Jamie, Mo Fa, The three Levels Movement and the Theory of the Three Periods, Journal of the International Association of Buddhist Studies 19 (1), 1–17, 1996
