= Liu Ming (politician, born 1954) =

Chinese politician

- 刘明

Secretary-General of the Fujian Provincial Committee of the Chinese People's Political Consultative Conference
- In office July 2011 – August 2017

Personal details
- Born: May 1954 (age 72) Yantai, Shandong, China
- Party: Chinese Communist Party
- Occupation: Politician

Liu Ming (Chinese: 刘明; born May 1954) is a Chinese politician from Yantai, Shandong. He is a member of the Chinese Communist Party and previously held the position of Secretary-General of the 11th Fujian Provincial Committee of the Chinese People's Political Consultative Conference (CPPCC).

== Biography ==
Liu was born in May 1954 in Nanping, Fujian, China. He joined the military in December 1969. He is from Yantai in Shandong. Liu graduated from the Fujian Party School. A member of the Chinese Communist Party, Liu was Secretary-General of the 11th Fujian Provincial Committee of the Chinese People's Political Consultative Conference (CPPCC) between July 2011 and August 2017.

Government offices
Preceded by Feng Shengkang	Secretary-General of the Fujian Provincial People's Government; July 2011 – April 2013	Succeeded by Liu Daoqi
Preceded by Liu Qili	Director of the General Office of the Fujian Provincial People's Government; August 2007 – August 2011	Succeeded by Tan Yunkun
