= Jingwan =

Buddhist monk

Jingwan (Chinese: 靜琬; pinyin: Jìngwǎn; died 639) was a Buddhist monk who flourished in the 7th century, based at Yunju Temple, Fangshan, China. Inspired by apocalyptic stories of the decline of Buddhism, in about 609 CE he conceived a project to carve Buddhist sutras onto stone tablets or steles to preserve them. The project began ca. 611 with major donations from the empress and her brother Xiao Yu in 611 CE. Other donations soon followed and Leiyin Cave was completed ca 616 CE. Once begun, the project was to continue, off and on, for 1000 years and produced the most extensive collection of sutra engravings in China.

Jingwan lived in a tumultuous period of Chinese history. He lived through the persecution of Buddhism during the Northern Zhou dynasty. The Sui dynasty finally reunited China as one empire after almost two centuries of division, but then rapidly seemed to lose control. A series of failed military campaigns against Korea, by Emperor Yang led to widespread rebellion and the eventual assassination of the Sui Emperor in 618. The Tang dynasty quickly replaced the Sui, but it took some years to impose order on the empire, and thus for much of Jingwan's career there was social and political turmoil, which seems to have fuelled his apocalyptic tendencies.

Jingwan left notes on his progress and in them also a moving account of his belief that the world was falling into a dark period in which Buddhism would disappear completely.

"The True Law and the Counterfeit Law, too, have been lost in the depths, all living beings are heavily stained and faithful hearts are no more... I fear for the day when the scriptures with disintegrate and dissolve, for paper and palm leaves are hard to maintain for a long period of time. Whenever I pinder these matters my tears flow in compassion and sorrow. In order to preserve the True Law, I, Jingwan, have led my followers to this mountain ridge to engrave in stone the sutras in the twelve divisions".

Like Christian millennialists, Buddhist eschatology had long predicted the end of the world, although in Buddhist terms this was a cyclic phenomena, occurring in three ages. Jingwan had used scriptural references to determine that he was living in the age of the End of the Dharma (末法 Mòfǎ), in which the Buddha's teachings would completely disappear. Indeed, he estimated that the dark age had begun in 553. Unlike Christian eschatology, after a long period of no Buddhism, the Dharma would be re-established by the next Buddha Maitreya.

The 17th century travelogue Dìjīng jǐngwù è (帝京景物略) by Liu Tong links Jìngwǎn to the Tiantai monk and noted prophet of the decline of Buddhism, Huìsī; however, there are no surviving earlier references to this association.

== Stone sutras ==
=== Phase One ===
Jingwan's initial effort was create the Leiyin or Thunder Sound Cave and line the walls with Buddhist sutras, primarily the Saddharmapuṇḍarikā-sūtra, the Vimalakīrti-nirdeśa, and the Prajñāpāramitā-vajracchedikā, along with extracts from a variety of other texts. The cave was probably developed from a natural opening in the cliff face in a ridge now called Shijingshan or Stone Sutra Mountain, one of a complex of peaks in the Fangshan complex. In all 19 texts, engraved on 147 stone slabs (ca. 58 x 86 cm) were set into the walls of the cave in two or three registers.

Leiyin cave seems to have intended to be an open shrine where people could come in and read (and likely worship) the sutras.

=== Phase Two ===
Having completed the Leiyin Cave, Jingwan began to expand, eventually creating a total of nine caves. However, in these subsequent caves the stone slabs were not installed on the walls, but densely stacked. Once a cave was full, it was sealed with a heavy stone door. Jingwan had expressed his wish that the collections not be disturbed unnecessarily.

Lothar Ledderose has characterised this change as "changing the audience" and has suggested that it was a gradual transition. In phase one, the sutras in Leiyin Cave were meant to be read by living people. With the subsequent caves the audience was imagined to be people in the future.

== Bibliography ==
- Ledderose, Lothar (2004). 'Changing the Audience' in Religion and Chinese Society (Vol. 1). A Centennial Conference of the École franşaise d'Extrême-Orient. John Lagerwey Ed., p385-409
- Lee, Sonya S. (2010) 'Transmitting Buddhism to a Future Age: The Leiyin Cave at Fangshan and Cave-Temples with Stone Scriptures in Sixth-Century China.' Archives of Asian Art. Vol. 60 (2010), pp. 43–78.
- Yong You & Yongyou Shi (2010) The Diamond Sutra in Chinese Culture. Buddha's Light Publishing.
