= Fujian Provincial Committee of the Chinese People's Political Consultative Conference =

Political advisory body in the People's Republic of China

Fujian Provincial Committee of the Chinese People's Political Consultative Conference 中国人民政治协商会议福建省委员会
- 13th
- Emblem of the Chinese People's Political Consultative Conference

Type
- Type: United front organ Constitutional convention (Historical); Legislature (Historical) of Chinese People's Political Consultative Conference

History
- Founded: January 1955; 71 years ago
- Preceded by: FujianProvincial People's Congress Consultative Committee

Leadership
- Chairperson: Teng Jiacai

Website
- www.fjzx.gov.cn

Chinese name
- Simplified Chinese: 中国人民政治协商会议福建省委员会
- Traditional Chinese: 中國人民政治協商會議福建省委員會
Transcriptions
Standard Mandarin
- Hanyu Pinyin: Zhōngguó Rénmín Zhèngzhì Xiéshāng Huìyì Fújiànshěng Wěiyuánhuì

Abbreviation
- Simplified Chinese: 福建省政协
- Traditional Chinese: 福建省政協
- Literal meaning: CPPCC FujianProvincial Committee
Transcriptions
Standard Mandarin
- Hanyu Pinyin: Fújiànshěng Zhèngxié

The Fujian Provincial Committee of the Chinese People's Political Consultative Conference is the advisory body and a local organization of the Chinese People's Political Consultative Conference in Fujian, China. It is supervised and directed by the Fujian Provincial Committee of the Chinese Communist Party.

== History ==
The Fujian Provincial Committee of the Chinese People's Political Consultative Conference traces its origins to the Fujian Provincial People's Congress Consultative Committee (福建省各界人民代表会议协商委员会), founded in 1949. During the Cultural Revolution (1966–1976), operations halted until its reconstitution in 1977 under its chairman Liao Zhigao. Notable milestones include the 1983 adoption of the "Fujian-Taiwan Economic Integration Proposal" and the 2009 establishment of the Straits Forum to engage Taiwanese entrepreneurs.

== Leadership ==
=== List of chairpersons ===
Name (English)	Name (Chinese)	Tenure begins	Tenure ends	Ref.
Zeng Jingbing	曾镜冰	January 1955	April 1956	
Jiang Yizhen	江一真	April 1956	February 1959	
Ye Fei	叶飞	February 1959	September 1964	
Fan Shiren	范式人	September 1964	December 1977	
Liao Zhigao	廖志高	December 1977	December 1979	
Wu Hongxiang	伍洪祥	December 1979	October 1985	
Yuan Gai	袁改	October 1985	January 1988	
Chen Guangyi	陈光毅	January 1988	January 1993	
You Dexin	游德馨	January 1993	January 2003	
Chen Mingyi	陈明义	January 2003	January 2008	
Liang Qiping	梁绮萍	January 2008	January 2013	
Zhang Changping	张昌平	January 2013	January 2018	
Cui Yuying	崔玉英	January 2018	January 2023	
Teng Jiacai	滕佳材	January 2023	Incumbent	

=== Committees ===
==== First Session ====
- Term: January 1955 – February 1959
- Chairman: Zeng Jingbing (– April 1956), Jiang Yizhen (from April 1956 – )
- Vice Chairmen: Lan Rongyu, Wang Yanan, Lin Zhifu, Liu Tong, Chen Shaokuan (from April 1956 –), Lin Xiude (from April 1956 –), Li Shuzhong (from April 1956 –), Liu Dongye (from April 1956 –)

==== Second Session ====
- Term: February 1959 – September 1964
- Chairman: Ye Fei
- Vice Chairmen: Wei Jinshui, Lin Yixin, Chen Shaokuan, Wang Yanan, Liu Tong, Lin Zhifu, Zhang Zhaohan, Lian Tisheng, Chen Xizhong, You Yangzu (from December 1962 –)

==== Third Session ====
- Term: September 1964 – December 1977
- Chairman: Fan Shiren
- Vice Chairmen: Chen Shaokuan, Lin Yixin, Huang Yaguang, Liu Tong, Lin Zhifu, Zhang Zhaohan, Lian Tisheng (deceased 1967), Chen Xizhong, You Yangzu

==== Fourth Session ====
- Term: December 1977 – April 1983
- Chairman: Liao Zhigao, Wu Hongxiang (from December 1979 –)
- Vice Chairmen: Lin Yixin, Yuan Gai, Ni Nanshan, Jia Jiumin, He Minxue, You Yangzu, Chen Xizhong, Lu Jiaxi, Guo Ruiren, Wang Shirui, Lu Haoran, Xiong Zhaoren (from December 1979 –), Zheng Ying (from December 1979 –), Luo Bingqin (from December 1979 –), Wei Jinshui (from December 1979 –), Ni Songmao (from December 1979 –), Zheng Danfu (from December 1979 –), Zuo Fengmei (from December 1979 –)

==== Fifth Session ====
- Term: April 1983 – January 1988
- Chairman: Wu Hongxiang, Yuan Gai (from October 1985 –)
- Vice Chairmen: Chen Xizhong, Zhang Kehui, Jiang Xuedao, Ni Songmao, Xu Xianshi (deceased 1986), Zhao Xiufu, Lu Haoran, Zuo Fengmei, Zheng Danfu, Lu Dao, Chen Yangzeng, Xu Jimei (from October 1985 –)

==== Sixth Session ====
- Term: January 1988 – January 1993
- Chairman: Chen Guangyi
- Vice Chairmen: Chen Xizhong, Zhang Kehui, Ling Qing, Ni Songmao, Zhao Xiufu, Lu Haoran, Chen Yangzeng, Xu Jimei, Gao Hu, Hong Huasheng, Lin Mengfei

==== Seventh Session ====
- Term: January 1993 – January 1998
- Chairman: You Dexin
- Vice Chairmen: Chen Xizhong (deceased 1995), Liu Jinmei, Ni Songmao (deceased 1995), Zhao Xiufu, Lu Haoran, Lin Mengfei (deceased 1994), Zou Erjun, Chen Yangzeng (deceased October 1994), Chen Jiazhen (from April 1994 –), Lin Yi (from April 1994 –), Jin Nengchou (from 1995 –)

==== Eighth Session ====
- Term: January 1998 – January 2003
- Chairman: You Dexin
- Vice Chairmen: Liu Jinmei, Wang Liantuan, Chen Rongchun, Lin Yi, Jin Nengchou, Chen Zengguang, Zhou Houwen, Zhou Chang, Wang Yaohua, Li Zuke, Chen Jiahua

==== Ninth Session ====
- Term: January 2003 – January 2008
- Chairman: Chen Mingyi
- Vice Chairmen: Pan Xincheng, Wang Liantuan, Jin Nengchou, Wang Yaohua, Li Zuke, Chen Jiahua, Cang Zhenhua, Ye Jiasong, Wu Xintao, Wang Qinmin

==== Tenth Session ====
- Term: January 2008 – January 2013
- Chairman: Liang Qiping
- Vice Chairmen: Zhang Xiefei, Chen Yun, Li Zuke, Ye Jiasong, Ye Jige, Zhang Fan, Zheng Lansun, Guo Zhenjia, Deng Liping

==== Eleventh Session ====
- Term: January 2013 – January 2018
- Chairman: Zhang Changping
- Vice Chairmen: Zhang Xiefei, Zhang Fan, Zheng Lansun, Guo Zhenjia, Lei Chunmei, Yang Gensheng, Chen Xiangxian, Chen Shaojun, Xue Weimin
- Secretary-General: Liu Ming

==== Twelfth Session ====
- Term: January 2018 – January 2023
- Chairman: Cui Yuying
- Vice Chairmen: Wang Huimin (– January 2020), Wei Keliang (– January 2020), Hong Jiexu, Xue Weimin, Zhang Zhaomin, Du Yuansheng, Wang Guangyuan, Ruan Shiwei, Liu Xianxiang, Xu Weize (from January 2020 –), Lin Zhongle (from January 2020 –)
- Secretary-General: Lu Kaijin

==== Thirteenth Session ====
- Term: January 2023 –
- Chairman: Teng Jiacai
- Vice Chairmen: Zhang Zhaomin, Wang Guangyuan, Ruan Shiwei, Liu Xianxiang, Yan Keshi, Yu Jun, Zhang Guowang (– January 2025), Huang Ling, Huang Ruxin, Huang Wenhui (from January 2024 –), Huang Haikun (from January 2025 –)
- Secretary-General: Lu Kaijin (– January 2024), Qiu Tianhua (from January 2024 –)

== See also ==
- Politics of Fujian
  - Fujian Provincial People's Congress
  - Fujian Provincial People's Government
    - Governor of Fujian
  - Fujian Provincial Committee of the Chinese Communist Party
    - Party Secretary of Fujian
  - Fujian Provincial Committee of the Chinese People's Political Consultative Conference
