= Dorje Rabdain =

Chinese politician

Dorjê Rabdain
- རྡོ་རྗེ་རབ་བརྟན་

Chairman of the Qinghai Provincial Committee of the Chinese People's Political Consultative Conference
- In office January 2018 – January 2022
- Preceded by: Rinqên Gya
- Succeeded by: Gönbo Zhaxi

Personal details
- Born: February 1956 (age 70) Jainca County, Qinghai, China
- Party: Chinese Communist Party
- Education: Qinghai Animal Husbandry and Veterinary Vocational and Technical College; Central Party School of the Chinese Communist Party

Chinese name
- Simplified Chinese: 多杰热旦
- Traditional Chinese: 多杰熱旦
Transcriptions
Standard Mandarin
- Hanyu Pinyin: Duōjiérèdàn

Dorjê Rabdain (Tibetan: རྡོ་རྗེ་རབ་བརྟན་, Wylie: rdo rje rab brtan, ZWPY: Dorje Rabdain; Chinese: 多杰热旦; born February 1956) is a Chinese politician of Tibetan ethnicity who served as chairman of the Qinghai Provincial Committee of the Chinese People's Political Consultative Conference from 2018 to 2022.

He was a member of the 18th CCP Central Commission for Discipline Inspection. He was a member of the 11th and 13th National Committee of the Chinese People's Political Consultative Conference.

== Biography ==
Dorjê Rabdain was born in Jainca County, Qinghai, in February 1956. In August 1972, he was accepted to Huangyuan Animal Husbandry School (now Qinghai Animal Husbandry and Veterinary Vocational and Technical College), majoring in veterinary medicine.

Dorjê Rabdain joined the Chinese Communist Party in July 1976. After graduation in August 1977, he was assigned to the Qinghai Animal Husbandry and Veterinary General Station. In April 1981, he was despatched to the Qinghai Provincial Department of Animal Husbandry, where he worked for six years. In January 1986, he became party secretary of Qinghai Department Store, and soon served as manager and party secretary of Qinghai Ethnic Trade Company. In March 1990, he rose to become deputy governor of Yushu Tibetan Autonomous Prefecture. He served as governor of Huangnan Tibetan Autonomous Prefecture from March 1996 to June 1997, and party secretary, the top political position in the prefecture, from June 1997 to November 2002. He was party secretary of Hainan Tibetan Autonomous Prefecture in November 2002, and held that office until May 2007. He was appointed head of the United Front Work Department of CCP Qinghai Provincial Committee in May 2007, concurrently holding the secretary of Qinghai Commission for Discipline Inspection position since February 2013. In January 2018, he was proposed as chairman of the Qinghai Provincial Committee of the Chinese People's Political Consultative Conference, the province's top political advisory body.

Government offices
| Preceded by ? | Governor of Huangnan Tibetan Autonomous Prefecture; 1996–1997 | Succeeded by Lang Guoqing |
Party political offices
| Preceded by ? | Communist Party Secretary of Huangnan Tibetan Autonomous Prefecture; 1997–2002 | Succeeded by Guo Ruzhuo |
| Preceded by Rinqên Gya | Communist Party Secretary of Hainan Tibetan Autonomous Prefecture; 2002–2007 | Succeeded by Tangod |
| Preceded by Rinqên Gya | Head of the United Front Work Department of CCP Qinghai Provincial Committee; 2007–2013 | Succeeded by Tangod |
| Preceded by Rinqên Gya | Secretary of Qinghai Commission for Discipline Inspection; 2012–2017 | Succeeded by Teng Jiacai |
Assembly seats
| Preceded by Rinqên Gya | Chairman of the Qinghai Provincial Committee of the Chinese People's Political Consultative Conference; 2018–2022 | Succeeded by Gönbo Zhaxi |
