= Fujian Provincial People's Congress =

Fujian Provincial People's Congress 福建省人民代表大会
- 14th Fujian Provincial People's Congress

Type
- Type: Province-level people's congress

Leadership
- Chairman of the Standing Committee: Zhou Zuyi, CCP since January 2023

Elections
- Fujian Provincial People's Congress voting system: Plurality-at-large voting & Two-round system

Chinese name
- Simplified Chinese: 福建省人民代表大会
- Traditional Chinese: 福建省人民代表大會
Transcriptions
Standard Mandarin
- Hanyu Pinyin: Fújiàn Shěng Rénmín Dàibiǎo Dàhuì

The Fujian Provincial People's Congress is the people's congress of Fujian, a province of China. The Congress is elected for a term of five years. The Fujian Provincial People's Congress meetings are held at least once a year. After a proposal by more than one-fifth of the deputies, a meeting of the people's congress at the corresponding level may be convened temporarily.

== History ==
The Standing Committee of the Fujian Provincial People's Congress was launched in December 1979.

== Organization ==
=== Chairpersons of the Standing Committee ===
| Name | Took office | Left office | Ref. |
|---|---|---|---|
| Liao Zhigao | December 1979 | March 1982 | |
| Xiang Nan | March 1982 | April 1983 | |
| Hu Hong | April 1983 | October 1985 | |
| Cheng Xu | October 1985 | January 1993 | |
| Chen Guangyi | January 1993 | April 1994 | |
| Jia Qinglin | April 1994 | October 1996 | |
| Yuan Qitong | April 1997 | January 2002 | |
| Song Defu | January 2002 | January 2005 | |
| Lu Zhangong | January 2005 | | |
| Sun Chunlan | | January 2013 | |
| You Quan | January 2013 | January 2018 | |
| Yu Weiguo | January 2018 | 27 January 2021 | |
| Yin Li | 27 January 2021 | January 2023 | |
| Zhou Zuyi | January 2023 | Incumbent | |

== See also ==
- System of people's congress
- Politics of Fujian
  - Fujian Provincial People's Congress
  - Fujian Provincial People's Government
    - Governor of Fujian
  - Fujian Provincial Committee of the Chinese Communist Party
    - Party Secretary of Fujian
  - Fujian Provincial Committee of the Chinese People's Political Consultative Conference
