= Baima (politician) =

Chinese politician

- པད་མ་

Chairman of the Qinghai Provincial Committee of the Chinese People's Political Consultative Conference
- In office February 2007 – February 2012
- Preceded by: Sanggyai Gya
- Succeeded by: Rinqên Gya

Personal details
- Born: April 1946 (age 80) Yushu County, Qinghai, China
- Party: Chinese Communist Party
- Education: Yushu Tibetan Autonomous Prefecture Normal School; Central Party School of the Chinese Communist Party

Chinese name
- Simplified Chinese: 白玛
- Traditional Chinese: 白瑪
Transcriptions
Standard Mandarin
- Hanyu Pinyin: Báimǎ

Baima (Tibetan: པད་མ་, Wylie: pad ma, ZWPY: Baima; Chinese: 白玛; born April 1946) is a Chinese politician of Tibetan ethnicity who served as chairman of the Qinghai Provincial Committee of the Chinese People's Political Consultative Conference between 2007 and 2012.

He was a member of the 16th CCP Central Commission for Discipline Inspection. He was a member of the 11th National Committee of the Chinese People's Political Consultative Conference.

== Biography ==
Baima was born in Yushu County (now Yushu Tibetan Autonomous Prefecture), Qinghai, in April 1946. In August 1960, he was admitted to Yushu Tibetan Autonomous Prefecture Normal School, he stayed at the school and taught there after graduation.

He got involved in politics in December 1967, when he was appointed deputy director of Chindu County Revolutionary Committee, and joined the Chinese Communist Party in October 1968. He rose to become deputy party secretary of the county in October 1973. He was deputy director of Qinghai Provincial Bureau of Education in June 1976, and held that office until January 1980. In January 1980, he became deputy secretary of the Qinghai Provincial Committee of the Communist Youth League of China, rising to secretary the next year. In April 1983, he was made deputy director of Qinghai Provincial Department of Animal Husbandry, but having held the position for only two years. In November 1985, he was named acting governor of Hainan Tibetan Autonomous Prefecture, confirmed in April 1986. In January 1993, he was promoted to become vice governor of Qinghai, a position he held until November 2001, when he was appointed deputy party secretary of Qinghai and secretary of Qinghai Provincial Commission for Discipline Inspection. In February 2007, he was proposed as chairman of the Qinghai Provincial Committee of the Chinese People's Political Consultative Conference, the province's top political advisory body.

On 28 February 2012, he took office as vice chairperson of the Ethnic and Religious Affairs Committee of the National Committee of the Chinese People's Political Consultative Conference, heading the religious works of Tibet, Sichuan and Qinghai.

Government offices
Preceded by ?	Governor of Hainan Tibetan Autonomous Prefecture; 1985–1993	Succeeded by Rinqên Gya
Party political offices
Preceded by ?	Secretary of Qinghai Provincial Commission for Discipline Inspection of the Chinese Communist Party; 2001–2007	Succeeded by Rinqên Gya
Assembly seats
Preceded by Sanggyai Gya	Chairman of the Qinghai Provincial Committee of the Chinese People's Political Consultative Conference; 2007–2012	Succeeded by Rinqên Gya
