= Rinqên Gya =

Chinese politician (1954–2021)

- རིན་ཆེན་རྒྱ་

Chairman of the Qinghai Provincial Committee of the Chinese People's Political Consultative Conference
- In office January 2012 – January 2018
- Preceded by: Baima
- Succeeded by: Dorje Rabdain

Secretary of Qinghai Commission for Discipline Inspection
- In office June 2007 – May 2012
- Preceded by: Baima
- Succeeded by: Dorje Rabdain

Communist Party Secretary of Hainan Tibetan Autonomous Prefecture
- In office December 1998 – November 2002
- Preceded by: Baima
- Succeeded by: Dorje Rabdain

Governor of Hainan Tibetan Autonomous Prefecture
- In office April 1996 – December 1998
- Preceded by: Baima
- Succeeded by: Dorje Rabdain

Personal details
- Born: July 1954 Gonghe County, Qinghai, China
- Died: March 9, 2021 (aged 66) Gonghe County, Qinghai, China
- Party: Chinese Communist Party
- Education: Central Party School of the Chinese Communist Party

Chinese name
- Chinese: 仁青加
Transcriptions
Standard Mandarin
- Hanyu Pinyin: Rénqīngjiā

Rinqên Gya (Tibetan: རིན་ཆེན་རྒྱ་, Wylie: rin chen rgya, ZWPY: Rinqên Gya; Chinese: 仁青加; July 1954 – 9 March 2021) was a Chinese politician of Tibetan ethnicity who served as chairman of the Qinghai Provincial Committee of the Chinese People's Political Consultative Conference between 2012 and 2018. Previously he served as secretary of Qinghai Commission for Discipline Inspection and before that, party secretary and governor of Hainan Tibetan Autonomous Prefecture.

He was an alternate of the 16th Central Committee of the Chinese Communist Party and a member of the 17th CCP Central Commission for Discipline Inspection. He was a member of the 10th, 12th, 13th National Committee of the Chinese People's Political Consultative Conference.

== Biography ==
Rinqên Gya was born into a herdsman family in Gonghe County, Qinghai, in July 1954.

He entered the workforce in October 1972, and joined the Chinese Communist Party in September 1975. He rose to become secretary of Gonghe County Party Committee of the Communist Youth League of China in November 1978 and party secretary of Xinghai County in April 1988. He was deputy party secretary of Haibei Tibetan Autonomous Prefecture in December 1990 and then deputy governor in April 1996. He served as governor of Hainan Tibetan Autonomous Prefecture from April 1996 to December 1998, and party secretary, the top political position in the prefecture, from December 1998 to November 2002. He also served as chairman of the People's Congress of Hainan Tibetan Autonomous Prefecture between March 1999 and May 2002. He was appointed head of the United Front Work Department of CCP Qinghai Provincial Committee in November 2002, concurrently serving as secretary of Qinghai Commission for Discipline Inspection since March 2007. In January 2012, he was proposed as chairman of the Qinghai Provincial Committee of the Chinese People's Political Consultative Conference, the province's top political advisory body. In March 2018, he took office as deputy chairperson of the Ethnic and Religious Affairs Committee of the National Committee of the Chinese people's Political Consultative Conference.

On 9 March 2021, he died of illness in Gonghe County, Qinghai, at the age of 66.

Government offices
Preceded by Baima	Governor of Hainan Tibetan Autonomous Prefecture; 1996–1998	Succeeded by Dorje Rabdain
Party political offices
Preceded by Baima	Communist Party Secretary of Hainan Tibetan Autonomous Prefecture; 1998–2002	Succeeded by Dorje Rabdain
Preceded by Baima	Secretary of Qinghai Commission for Discipline Inspection; 2007–2012	Succeeded by Dorje Rabdain
Assembly seats
Preceded by Baima	Chairman of the Qinghai Provincial Committee of the Chinese People's Political Consultative Conference; 2012–2018	Succeeded by Dorje Rabdain
