= Fujian Provincial People's Government =

Provincial-level government of Fujian, China

Fujian Provincial People's Government 福建省人民政府
- Established: August 1949; 77 years ago

Leadership
- Governor: Guo Ningning; 4 November 2026
- Parent body: Central People's Government; Fujian Provincial People's Congress
- Elected by: Fujian Provincial People's Congress

Meeting place
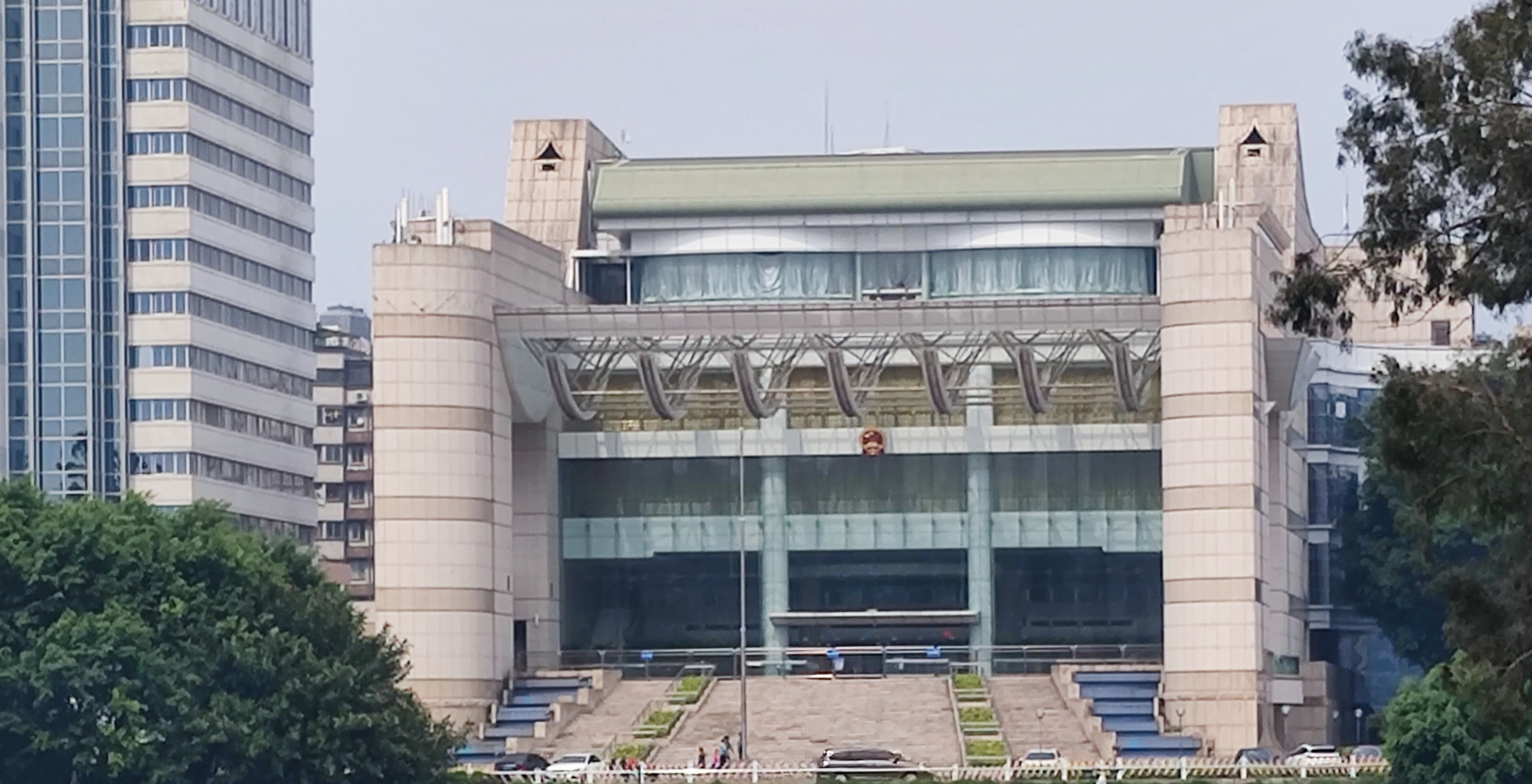
- Headquarters

Website
- www.fujian.gov.cn

The Fujian Provincial People's Government (Chinese: 福建省人民政府; pinyin: Fújiànshěng Rénmín Zhèngfǔ) is the local administrative agency of Fujian. It is officially elected by the Fujian Provincial People's Congress and is formally responsible to the Fujian Provincial People's Congress and its Standing Committee. Under the country's one-party system, the governor is subordinate to the secretary of the Fujian Provincial Committee of the Chinese Communist Party. The Provincial government is headed by a governor, currently Guo Ningning.

== History ==
The Fujian Provincial People's Government was established in August 1949. Its name was changed to Fujian Provincial People's Committee (福建省人民委员会) in February 1955 and subsequently Fujian Provincial Revolutionary Committee (福建省革命委员会) in August 1968 during the Cultural Revolution. It reverted to its former name of Fujian Provincial People's Government in December 1979.

== Organization ==
The organization of the Fujian Provincial People's Government includes:

- General Office of the Fujian Provincial People's Government

=== Component Departments ===
- Fujian Provincial Development and Reform Commission
- Fujian Provincial Education Department
- Fujian Provincial Science and Technology Department
- Fujian Provincial Industry and Information Technology Department
- Fujian Provincial Ethnic and Religious Affairs Commission
- Fujian Provincial Public Security Department
- Fujian Provincial Civil Affairs Department
- Fujian Provincial Justice Department
- Fujian Provincial Finance Department
- Fujian Provincial Human Resources and Social Security Department
- Fujian Provincial Natural Resources Department
- Fujian Provincial Ecology and Environment Department
- Fujian Provincial Housing and Urban Rural Development Department
- Fujian Provincial Transportation Department
- Fujian Provincial Water Resources Department
- Fujian Provincial Agriculture and Rural Affairs Department
- Fujian Provincial Commerce Department
- Fujian Provincial Culture and Tourism Department
- Fujian Provincial Health Commission
- Fujian Provincial Veterans Affairs Department
- Fujian Provincial Emergency Management Department
- Fujian Provincial Audit Office
- Foreign Affairs Office of Fujian Provincial People's Government

=== Directly affiliated special institution ===
- State-owned Assets Supervision and Administration Commission of Fujian Provincial People's Government

=== Organizations under the government ===
- Fujian Provincial Forestry Bureau
- Fujian Provincial Ocean and Fisheries Bureau
- Fujian Provincial Administration for Market Regulation
- Fujian Provincial Radio and Television Bureau
- Fujian Provincial Sports Bureau
- Fujian Provincial Statistics Bureau
- Fujian Provincial Defense Mobilization Office
- Fujian Provincial Medical Security Bureau
- Fujian Provincial Local Financial Supervision and Administration Bureau
- Fujian Provincial Letters and Visits Bureau

=== Departmental management organization ===
- Fujian Provincial Office Affairs Management Bureau
- Office of Fujian Digital Fujian Construction Leading Group (Fujian Big Data Management Bureau)
- Fujian Provincial Grain and Material Reserve Bureau
- Fujian Provincial Prison Administration
- Fujian Provincial Cultural Relics Bureau
- Fujian Provincial Drug Administration
- Fujian Provincial Bureau of Disease Prevention and Control

=== Public institutions ===
- Fujian Academy of Social Sciences
- Fujian Academy of Agricultural Sciences
- Fujian Provincial Federation of Supply and Marketing Cooperatives
- Fujian Radio Film and TV Group
- Fujian Provincial Government Investment Project Evaluation Center
- China Strait Talent Market
- Fujian Geological and Mineral Exploration and Development Bureau
- Fujian Innovation Research Institute
- Fujian Provincial People's Government Development Research Center

=== Agency ===
- Pingtan Comprehensive Experimental Zone
- Fuzhou New Area
- Quanzhou Taiwan Business Investment Zone
- Mount Wuyi National Park
- Beijing Office of the Fujian Provincial People's Government
- Shanghai Office of the Fujian Provincial People's Government
- Guangzhou Office of the Fujian Provincial People's Government
- Shenzhen Office of the Fujian Provincial People's Government

== Leadership ==
Name	Office	Party	Date of birth	Other offices	Ref.
Guo Ningning	Acting Governor Secretary of the Provincial Government Party Leading Group	CCP	July 1970 (age 56)	Deputy Secretary of the Party Fujian Provincial Committee Alternate member of the CCP Central Committee	
Zhao Zenglian	Vice Governor Deputy Secretary of the Party Leading Group	CCP	March 1970 (age 56)		
Li Jiancheng	Vice Governor Member of the Party Leading Group	CCP	June 1967 (age 59)		
Lin Ruiliang	Vice Governor Member of the Party Leading Group	CCP	October 1966 (age 60)		
Wang Jinfu	Vice Governor Member of the Party Leading Group	CCP	December 1973 (age 52)		
Jiang Erxiong	Vice Governor	TDSL	January 1967 (age 59)	Chairperson of the Fujian Provincial Committee of the TDSL	
Wu Bin	Vice Governor Member of the Party Leading Group	CCP	September 1967 (age 59)		
Li Bin	Secretary-General Member of the Party Leading Group	CCP	December 1969 (age 56)		

== Cross-Strait Relations ==
In January 2025, the Fujian provincial government released a new document that listed new incentives aimed at enhancing the readiness and professionalism of maritime militia forces, especially those expected to play a critical role in a potential Taiwan conflict. The policy introduces financial rewards, job security, and social benefits to encourage greater training participation and improve operational reliability. This move represents a notable effort to tackle persistent morale and compensation challenges within China's militia system. The maritime militia remains a vital element of the Chinese Communist Party's broader strategic agenda, particularly in enforcing its claims in the South China Sea and other contested maritime areas.

== See also ==
- Politics of Fujian
  - Fujian Provincial People's Congress
  - Fujian Provincial People's Government
    - Governor of Fujian
    - Fujian Provincial Revolutionary Committee
  - Fujian Provincial Committee of the Chinese Communist Party
    - Party Secretary of Fujian
  - Fujian Provincial Committee of the Chinese People's Political Consultative Conference
