= Sangyejia =

Chinese politician

- སངས་རྒྱས་རྒྱ་

Chairman of the Qinghai Provincial Committee of the Chinese People's Political Consultative Conference
- In office January 2001 – January 2007
- Preceded by: Han Yingxuan
- Succeeded by: Baima

Personal details
- Born: November 1942 (age 83) Ping'an County, Qinghai, China
- Party: Chinese Communist Party
- Education: Qinghai University for Nationalities; Central Party School of the Chinese Communist Party

Chinese name
- Simplified Chinese: 桑结加
- Traditional Chinese: 桑結加
Transcriptions
Standard Mandarin
- Hanyu Pinyin: Sāngjiéjiā

Sangyejia (Tibetan: སངས་རྒྱས་རྒྱ་, Wylie: sangs rgyas rgya, ZWPY: Sangyejia; Chinese: 桑结加; born November 1942) is a Chinese politician of Tibetan ethnicity who served as chairman of the Qinghai Provincial Committee of the Chinese People's Political Consultative Conference from 2001 to 2007.

He was an alternate member of the 14th and 15th Central Committee of the Chinese Communist Party. He was a member of the 11th National Committee of the Chinese People's Political Consultative Conference.

== Biography ==
Sangyejia was born in Ping'an County, Qinghai, in November 1942. In 1959, he was admitted to Qinghai University for Nationalities, majoring in Chinese language and literature. In September 1963, he joined the Qinghai People's Publishing House as an editor and party secretary.

He joined the Chinese Communist Party in February 1972, and got involved in politics in May 1975, when he was assigned to the Qinghai Provincial Bureau of Culture. He was elevated to deputy head of Qinghai Provincial Publishing Bureau and Qinghai Provincial Department of Culture. In December 1983, he was recalled to the original Qinghai People's Publishing House and appointed president and party branch secretary. He concurrently served as deputy head of the Publicity Department of the CCP Qinghai Provincial Committee from October 1987 to May 1988. He was deputy party secretary of Qinghai in May 1988, and held that office until January 2001. In January 2001, he was proposed as chairman of the Qinghai Provincial Committee of the Chinese People's Political Consultative Conference, the province's top political advisory body. In February 2007, he was made vice chairperson of the Culture, History and Study Committee of the National Committee of the Chinese People's Political Consultative Conference.

Assembly seats
Preceded by Han Yingxuan	Chairman of the Qinghai Provincial Committee of the Chinese People's Political Consultative Conference; 2001–2007	Succeeded by Baima
