= Yunju Temple =

Buddhist temple in China

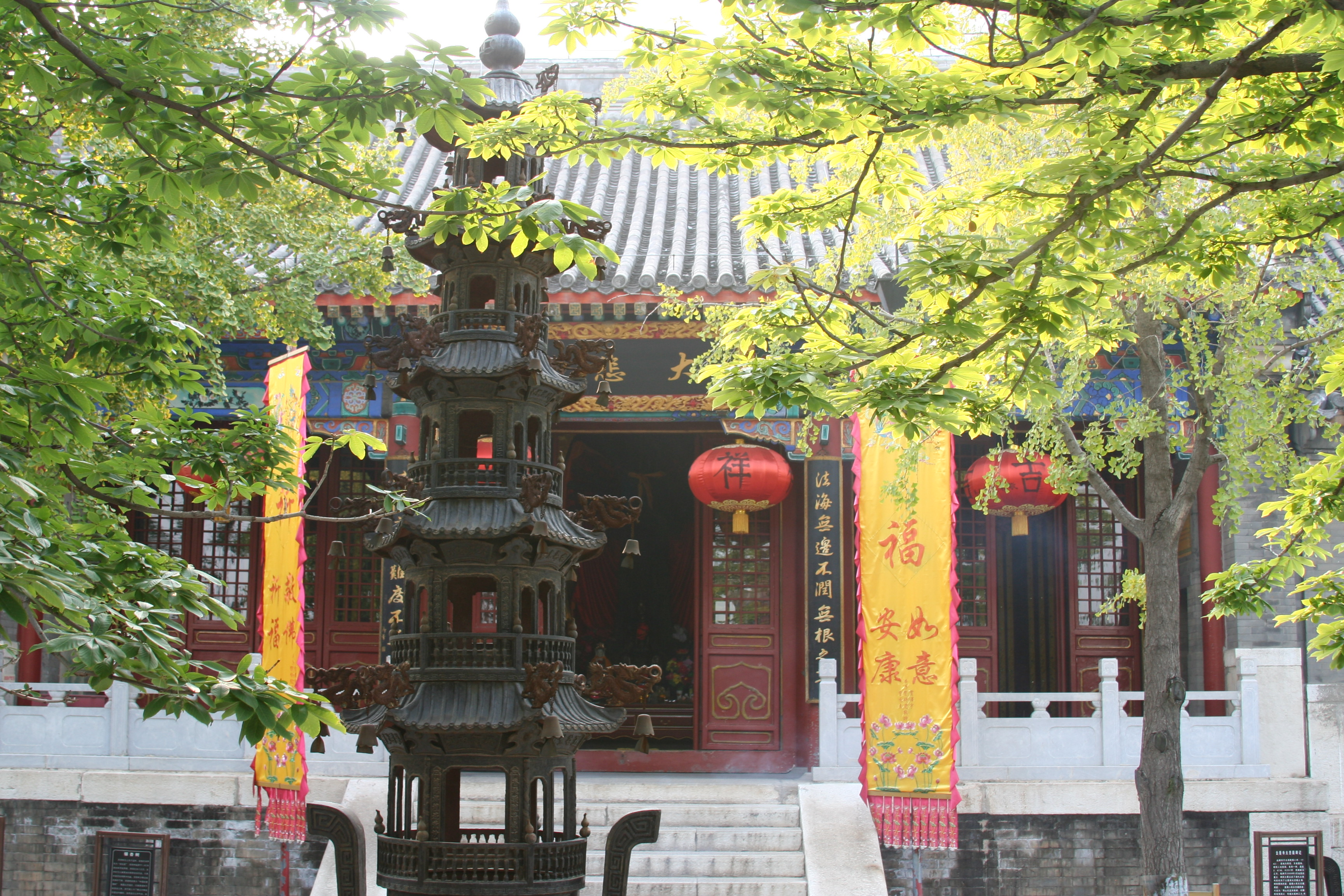
- Guanyin Hall of the Yunju Temple

- Location in Beijing municipality

Religion
- Affiliation: Buddhism

Location
- Country: China
- Coordinates: 39°36′29″N 115°46′04″E

Yunju Temple (simplified Chinese: 云居寺; traditional Chinese: 雲居寺; pinyin: Yúnjū Sì) is a Buddhist temple located in Fangshan District, 70 kilometers (43 mi) southwest of Beijing and contains the world's largest collection of stone Buddhist sutra steles. Yunju Temple also contains one of only two extant woodblocks for the Chinese Buddhist Tripitaka in the world as well as rare copies of printed and manuscript Chinese Buddhist Tripitakas. It also has many historic pagodas dating from the Tang and Liao dynasty.

== History ==
The exact year Yunju Temple was built is unknown; however construction started during the Northern Qi dynasty (550 CE – 570 CE). (Note: Translation 关于云居寺的始建时间，许多人认为是静琬刻经时所建，其实不然。据辽天庆七年(公元 1117 年)《大辽燕京涿州范阳县白带山石经云居寺释迦佛舍利塔记》载：“案诸传记并起寺碑，原其此寺始自北齐(公元 550—577年)，迄至隋代，有幽州智泉寺沙门智苑，……发心磨莹贞石镌造大藏经，以备法灭 tr. to English: regarding the time Yunju temple was first built, many people assume it was when Jingwan started to engrave stone sutra steles, in fact that is not so. According to “The Records of the Great Liao Yanjing Zhuozhou Fanyang County Baidai Mountain Stone Sutra Stele and Yunju Temple Buddha Sarira Pagoda” written in 1117 CE, it was recorded : “According to numerous records and temple stone steles, originally this temple (i.e. Yunju Temple) started in the Northern Qi Dynasty(550 CE – 570 CE) up to the Sui Dynasty (581 CE – 618 CE) when a monk named Zhiyuan (also known as Jingwan) from Zhiquan Temple located in Youzhou province made a vow to polish solid rock to engrave the Buddhist Tripitaka in order to prepare for the end of Buddhism.) Around 611 CE, a high priest named Jingwan (? - 639 CE) made a vow to engrave Buddhist sutras on stone steles to insure Buddhism's future survival because of the challenges Chinese Buddhism had recently faced during the anti-Buddhist campaigns of Emperor Taiwu of Northern Wei and Emperor Wu of Northern Zhou. (Note: Shi 石經的雕刻工程，是起於佛教的末法思想，所謂末法之說……歷正法，像法，末法的三期，最後法滅。南嶽慧思禪師相信正法五百年，像法一千年，末法一萬年，而隋世正好是佛涅槃一千五百年，因為剛經過北魏太武帝及北周武帝的滅法運動，佛法遭受到無情的打擊，所以在南嶽慧思禪師，就有末法時代已經開始的信仰。當時他的弟子靜琬，便擔心佛教很快就會被毀，所以發起了石雕佛經藏於山洞的運動。 tr. to English: The engraving (of the stone sutra steles) came from the belief in (the coming of) the Degenerate Age of Buddhism……divides the time period when Buddhism exists in the world into three ages : the Age of the Right Dharma, the Age of the Semblance Dharma and the Degenerate Age – the end of which Buddhism perishes (c.f. Three Ages of Buddhism). Chan Master Huisi of Nanyue believed that the Age of the Right Dharma would last five hundred years, the Age of the Semblance Dharma would last one thousand years and the Degenerate Age would last ten thousand years. Moreover because the Sui Dynasty (581 CE- 618 CE) was (believed to be) already 1,500 years since the parinirvāṇa of Buddha and because of the recent memories of the ruthless attacks Buddhism suffered during Emperor Taiwu of Northern Wei and Emperor Wu of Northern Zhou’s Anti-Buddhist Movement, Chan Master Huisi of Nanyue believed the Degenerate Age was already in progress. At the same time, his disciple Jingwan also worried Buddhism would very soon be destroyed and therefore started the movement of engraving stone sutra steles to be hidden in mountain caves.) Venerable Jingwan therefore set in motion a movement to engrave Buddhist sutras on stone steles that continued for over a thousand years; the last stone sutra stele engraved is dated to 1691 CE --- although by that time, the belief in the impending disaster of the Degenerate Age had subsided. (Note: CBETA [0012a06] ...清代康熙以後雖然幾次修葺雲居寺，也刻了一些經碑立於寺中但已失去石經原來錮藏以備法滅時充經本用的意義了。 tr. to English: [0012a06] ...Yunju Temple was repaired several times during the Qing Dynasty after Emperor Kangxi's reign and some sutras were also engraved on stone steles which were placed inside temple halls. However by this time, the original motivation of storing the stone sutra steles in caves to prepare for the end of Buddhism and then use them to renew Buddhism had already disappeared.) (Note: Translation 房山石经始刻于隋朝，迄于清康熙三十年(公元 1691年) tr. to English: Fangshan Stone Sutra Steles began from the Sui Dynasty and ended in the Qing Dynasty in 1691 CE) The stone sutra steles varied in size and were engraved on both sides. In addition to text, they were also engraved sometimes with images of Buddhas and Bodhisattvas as well as Siddhaṃ Letters. The collection of stone sutra steles is also sometimes called the Fangshan Stone Sutra (Chinese: 房山石經). Venerable Jingwan initially vowed to engrave the entire Tripitaka; at least ten titles still survive today. (Note: CBETA [0012a10]靜琬最初 發願要刻的十二部經具體經名沒有寫明，已無法考查。然就現存可認為是靜琬刻造的石經，主要有：《法華經》、《華嚴經》、《晉譯》、《涅槃經》、《維摩經》、《勝鬘經》、《金剛經》、《佛遺教經》、《無量義經》、《彌勒上生經》等。 tr. to English: [0011a07] Ven. Jingwan initially vowed to engrave the entire Tripitaka [but since] what he actually accomplished was not recorded, now it's impossible for us to know [with certainty what was actually engraved]. But based on the surviving [stone steles], that were likely engraved during Jingwan's time, the main ones are: The Lotus Sutra, The Avatamsaka Sutra, Jin Dynasty Translations (265 CE - 420 CE), Mahaparinirvana Sutra, Vimalakirti Sutra, Śrīmālādevī Siṃhanāda Sutra, Diamond Sutra, Sutra on Buddha's Bequeathed Teaching, Sutra of Immeasurable Life, Sutra of Maitreya's Ascension, etc.,) His successors continued his work. One of them was involved in the engraving of the oldest extant copy (dated to 661 CE) of Tripitaka Master Xuanzang’s 649 CE translation of the Heart Sutra. During the Sui and Tang dynasties, donors oftentimes determined which sutra to engrave on the stone stele; hence many sutras were engraved multiple times. Royal patronage began in the Sui dynasty (see below for rediscovery of Buddha relics). During the Tang dynasty, Princess Jinxian (ca. 713 - 755 CE) petitioned Emperor Xuanzong to donate over 4,000 manuscript scrolls of the Buddhist Tripitaka and land to support Yunju Temple's engraving of stone sutra steles. (Note: CBETA [0014a17] 惠暹和玄法的刻造石經事業，得到了唐玄宗第八妹金仙長公主的大力施助。據上述王守泰撰《山頂石浮圖後記》記載：[0015a01] 「大唐開元十八年，金仙長公主為奏聖上，賜大唐新舊譯經四千餘卷，充幽府范陽縣為石經本...」and [0015a05] 《後記》同時還載明了當時負責送這些經本的人是長安崇福寺沙門，著名的《開元釋教錄》著者智昇。由此可見，金仙長公主當時對房山雲居寺石經事業的施助，不僅送來四千多卷經本，而且劃出大片田園山林作為刻造石經的經費。因此惠暹和玄法才有條件刻造幾部大部頭的佛經。 tr. to English: [0014a17] Huixian and Xuanfa (descendants of disciples of Jingwan) engraving of stone sutras received the tremendous support of Emperor Xuanzong's eighth younger sister, Princess Jinxian. ...according to the "Latter Record of the Mountaintop Stone Stele": [0015a01] Princess Jinxian petition Emperor Xuanzong in 730 CE to donate over 4,000 (manuscript) scrolls of New and Old translations of the Tripitaka for the engraving of stone sutras in Chongyufu Fanyang District...and [0015a05] According to the "Latter Record" at the same time the person responsible for delivering these manuscript scrolls was Chang'an's famous monk/writer Zhisheng of Chongfu Temple, (compiler of the Kaiyuan Record of Buddhist Teaching ca. 730 CE(Catalog)). Therefore the assistance Princess Jinxian offered at the time to the engraving of the stone sutras at Yunju Temple, was not limited to only donating 4,000 scrolls of sutras but furthermore she planned for the expense of engraving the stone sutras with the donation of fields, orchards and forests. Therefore Huixian and Xuanfa was given the ability to engrave large sections of Buddhist sutras.) There is still a pagoda commemorating Princess Jinxian's support on the top of Fangshan mountain. (Note: Shi 到現在為止，在石經山的頂上還有一座金仙公主的紀念塔。 tr. to English: Even now on the top of Stone Sutra Mountain (on top of Leiyin Cave) there is still a pagoda that commemorates Princess Jinxian.) During the Liao dynasty, royal patronage attempted to complete the engraving of the incomplete Mahayana sutras and missing Mahayana titles. Also during this time, royal patronage attempted to engrave on stone stele the entire Liao dynasty's Khitan Tripitaka (Chinese: 契丹藏). Because the Sui and Tang dynasty manuscripts on which the Sui and Tang dynasty stone steles were based as well as the printed copies of the Khitan Tripitaka on which the Liao dynasty stone sutras were based have largely disappeared, this makes the Fangshan stone sutras of Yunju Temple a rare treasure house of Buddhist sutras. Since these stone steles were engraved with an eye on fidelity to the original, they can be used to potentially correct later printed Tripitakas. Since Venerable Jingwan's time a total of nine caves were excavated and filled with stone sutra steles, two underground depository rooms were also excavated and numerous temple halls were added and repaired. The most famous cave is Cave No. 5 popularly known as Leiyin Cave (Chinese: 雷音洞). This cave is opened for public viewing and is a large cave covered with stone sutra steles on four walls with an area for Buddhist ceremonies. Formerly a statue of Maitreya, the next Buddha was enshrined here but it was removed by unknown persons during the early 1940s. In the early 1940s, a significant portion of the temple was destroyed; however substantial portions have since been restored. (Note: Shi 可惜在一九四二年，遭日軍砲火擊毀，幾乎全部夷為平地，僅剩南北兩座磚塔及碑刻等遺跡而已。 trans to English - Regrettably in 1942, [Yunju temple] was destroyed by Japanese military bombardment to the point where its entirety was almost razed to the ground...) Based on inscriptions on a stone stele found in a refreshment/rest stop pavilion donated by a Ming dynasty Buddhist stating the presence of Buddha relics or śarīra in Leiyin Cave, on November 27, 1981, archaeologists rediscovered the flesh śarīra (of Buddha) donated by Emperor Yangdi of the Sui dynasty dated to the 8th day of the 4th lunar month 616 CE.

== Collection ==
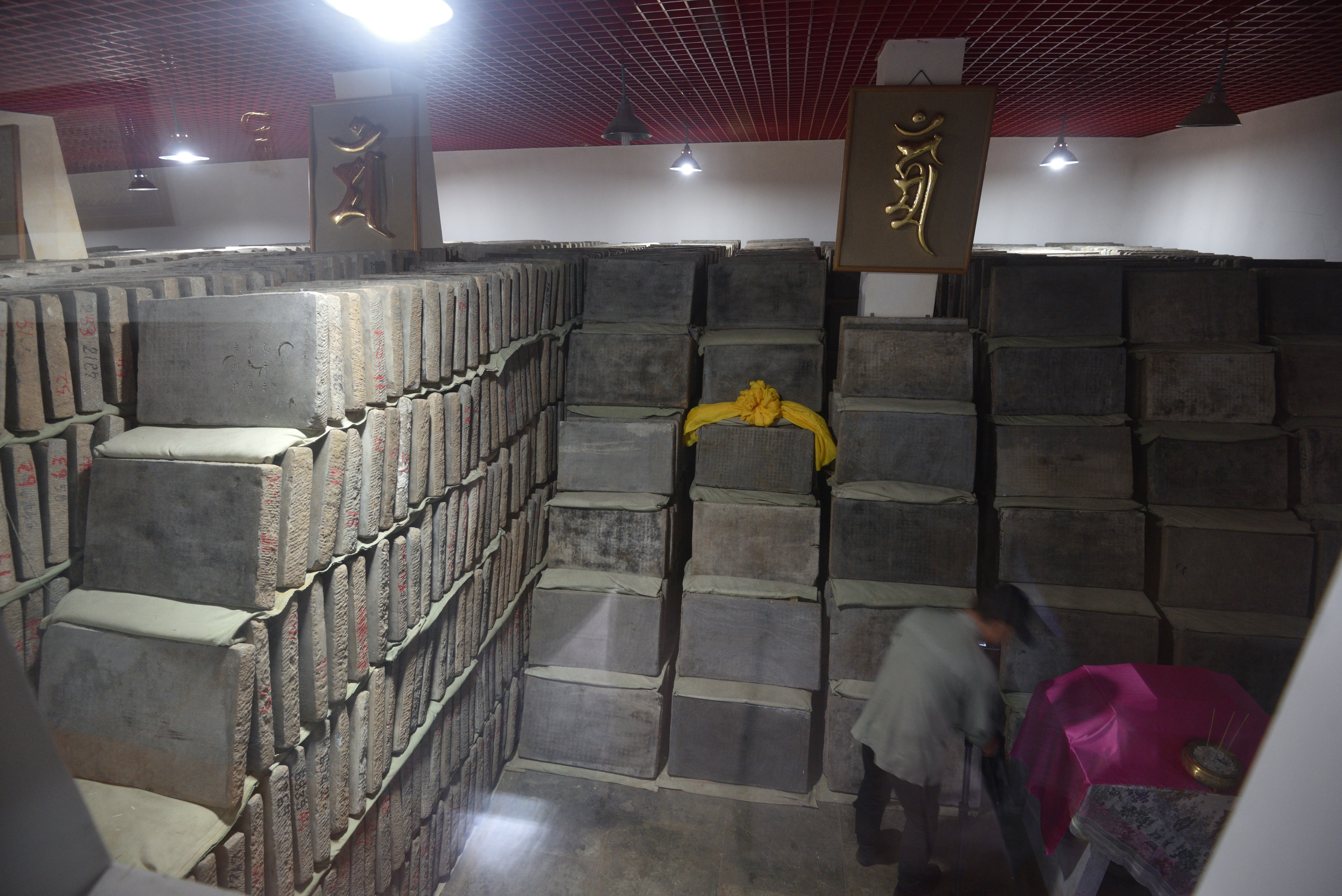
Stone Buddhist sutras in archive at Yunju Temple

There are also over 22,000 scrolls of rare printed or manuscript sutras kept at Yunju Temple. The Ming dynasty's Yongle Southern Tripitaka (1420 CE) and Yongle Northern Tripitaka (1440 CE) are stored here as well as individual printed sutras and manuscripts.

In total, 1,122 Buddhist sutras in 3572 volumes were produced at the temple consisting of over 14,200 stone steles engraved on both sides.

Yunju Temple also has one of only two extant complete woodblocks of the Chinese Tripitaka in the world: namely the Qianlong Tripitaka (1733). Carved on over 77,000 blocks, it attracts a large number of visitors.

Yunju Temple also has two bone relics of the Buddha (śarīra) available for public viewing.

== Layout ==
There were originally six halls in the temple, arranged from east to west. On both sides of the halls, there was accommodation for guests and dormitories for monks.

The temple contains a total of twelve pagodas from the Tang and Liao dynasties and three tomb pagodas from the Qing dynasty.

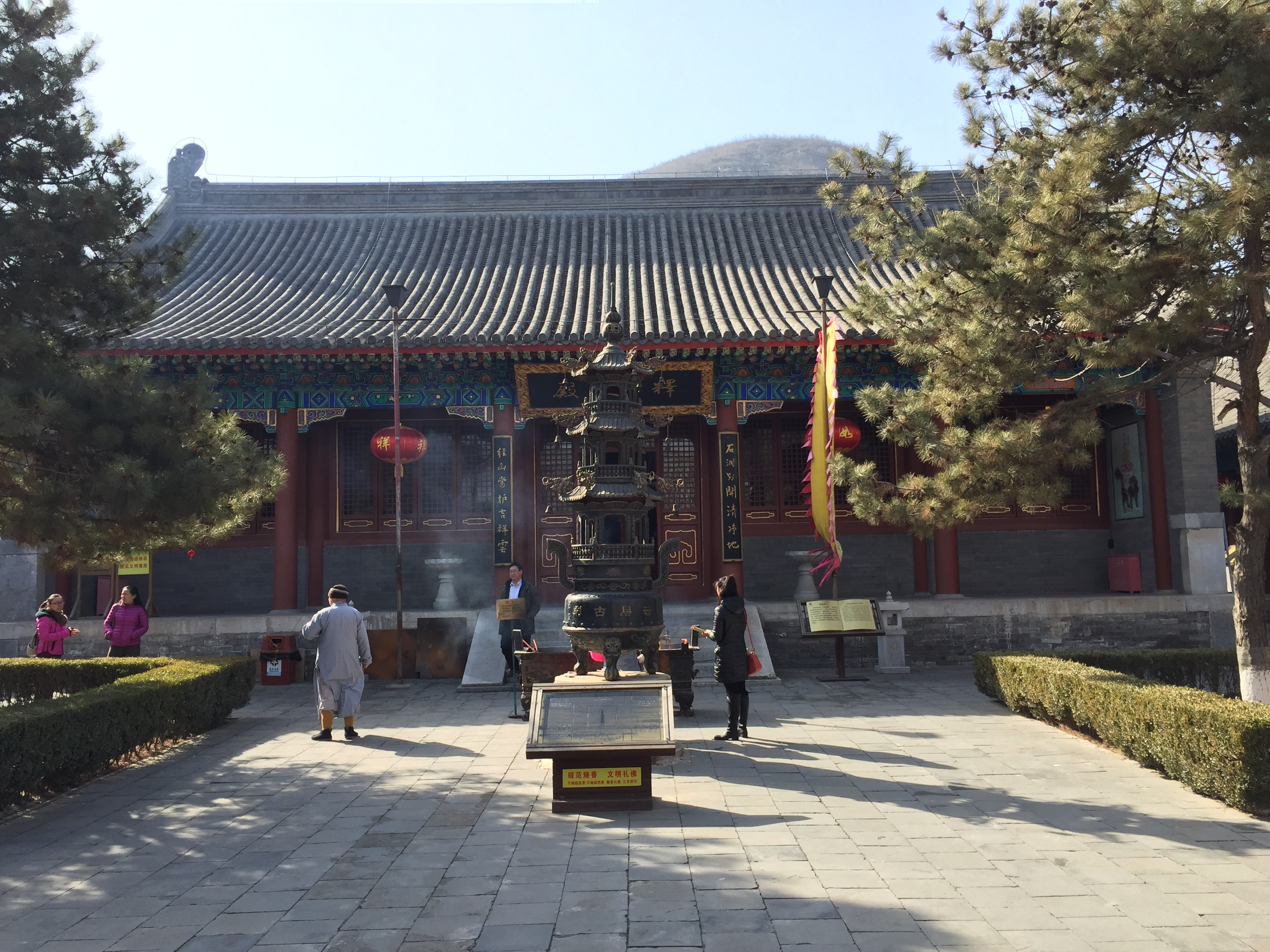
Sakyamuni Palace

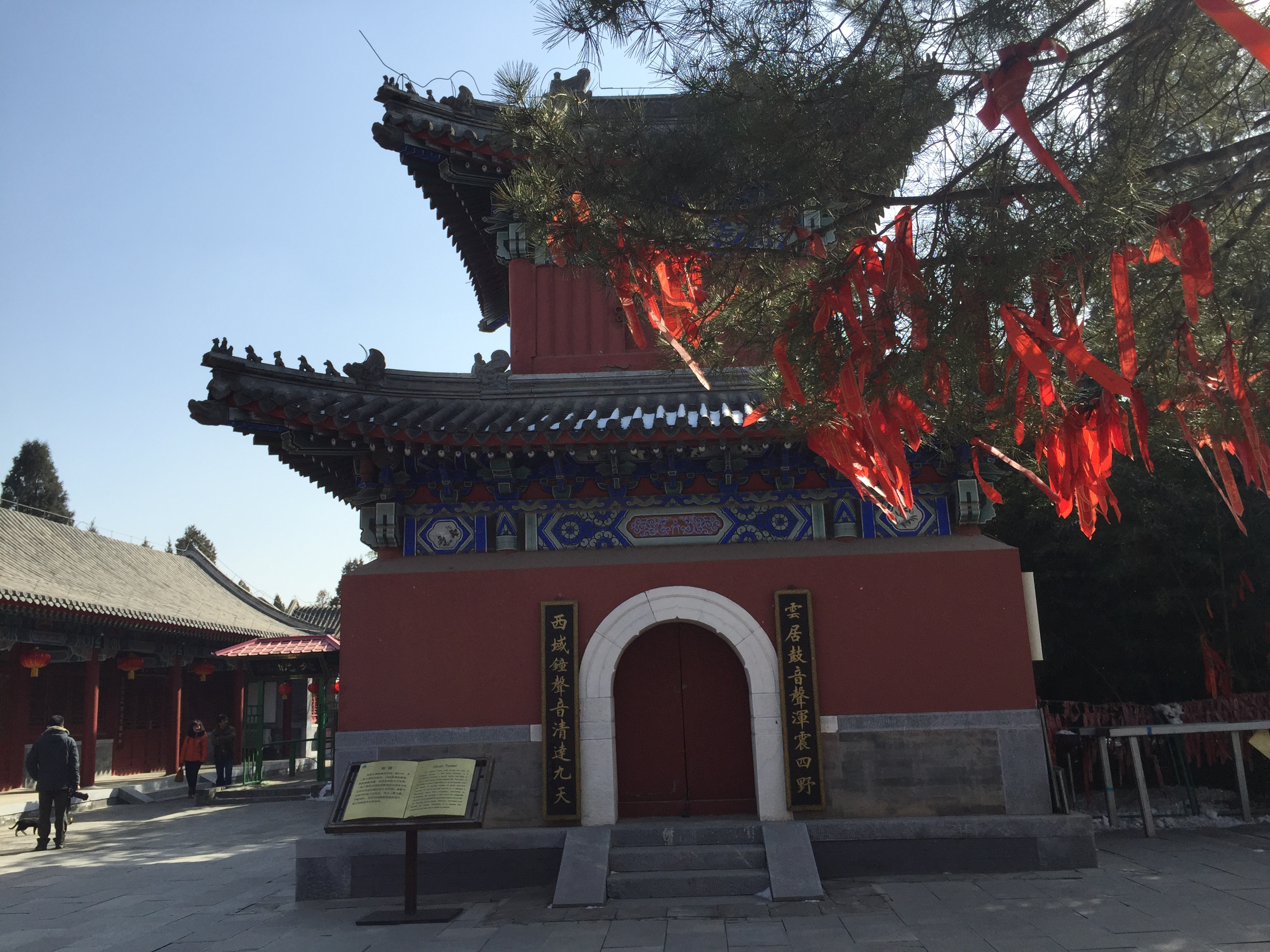
Yunju's Drum Tower

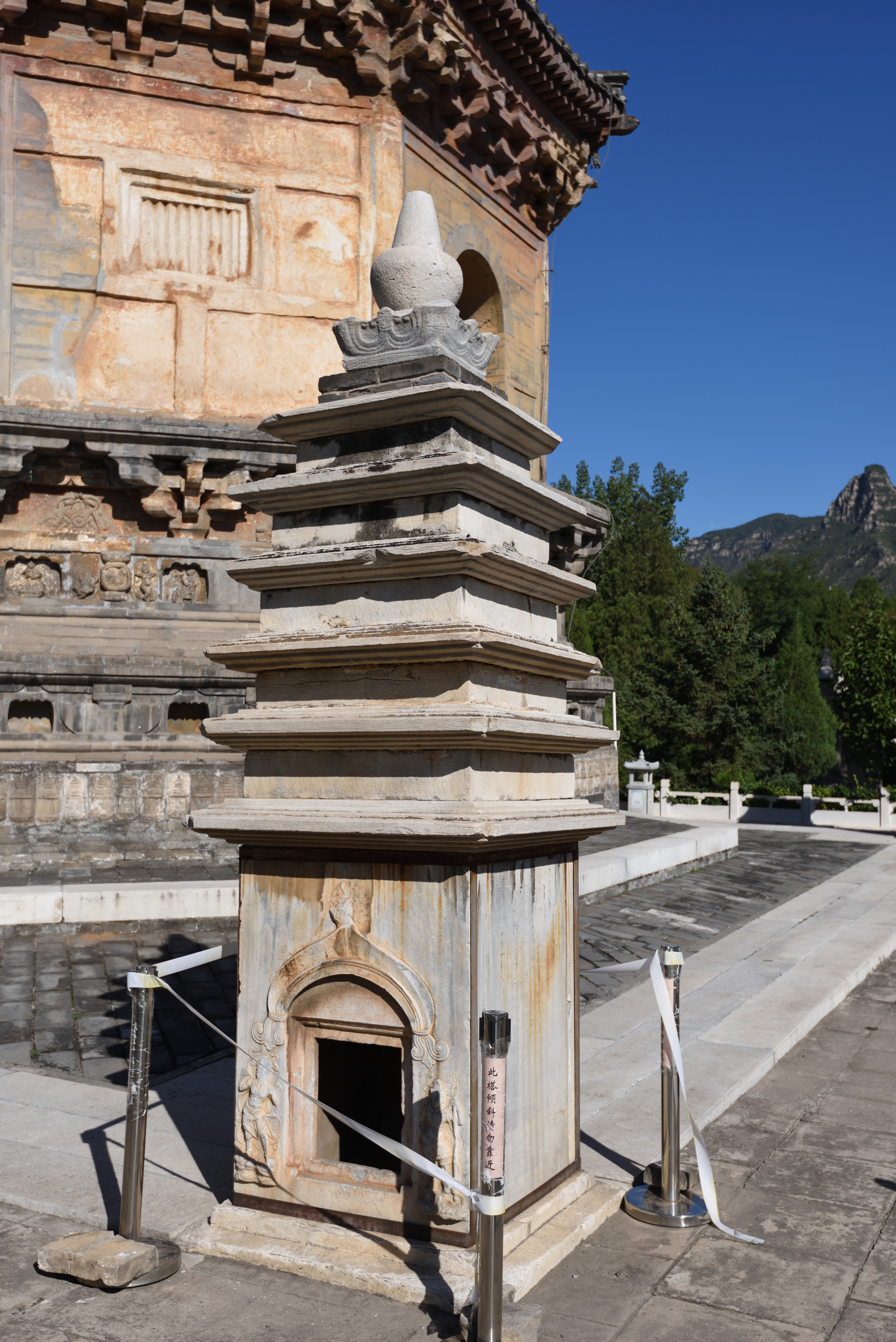
Taiji Pagoda

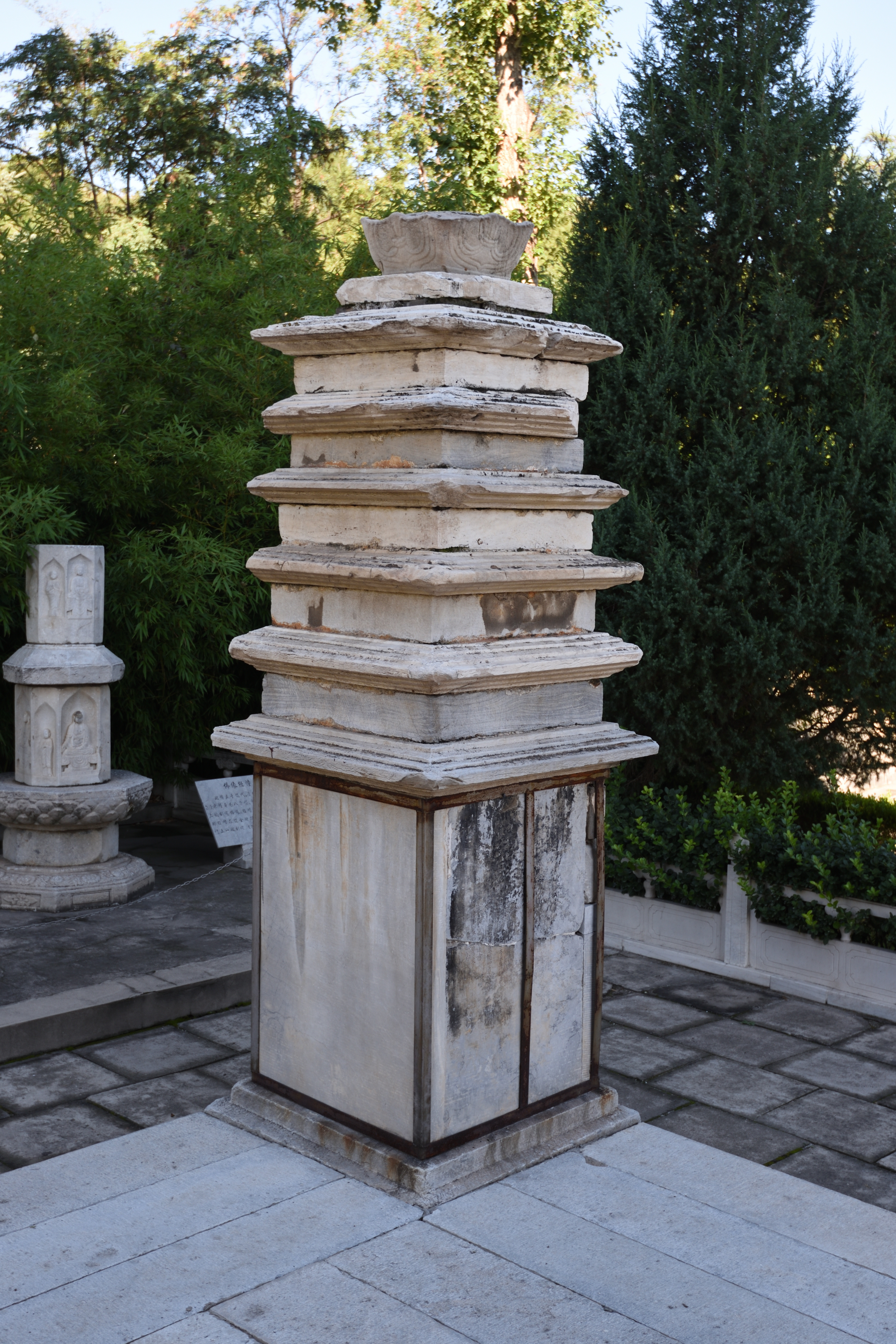
Kaiyuan Pagoda

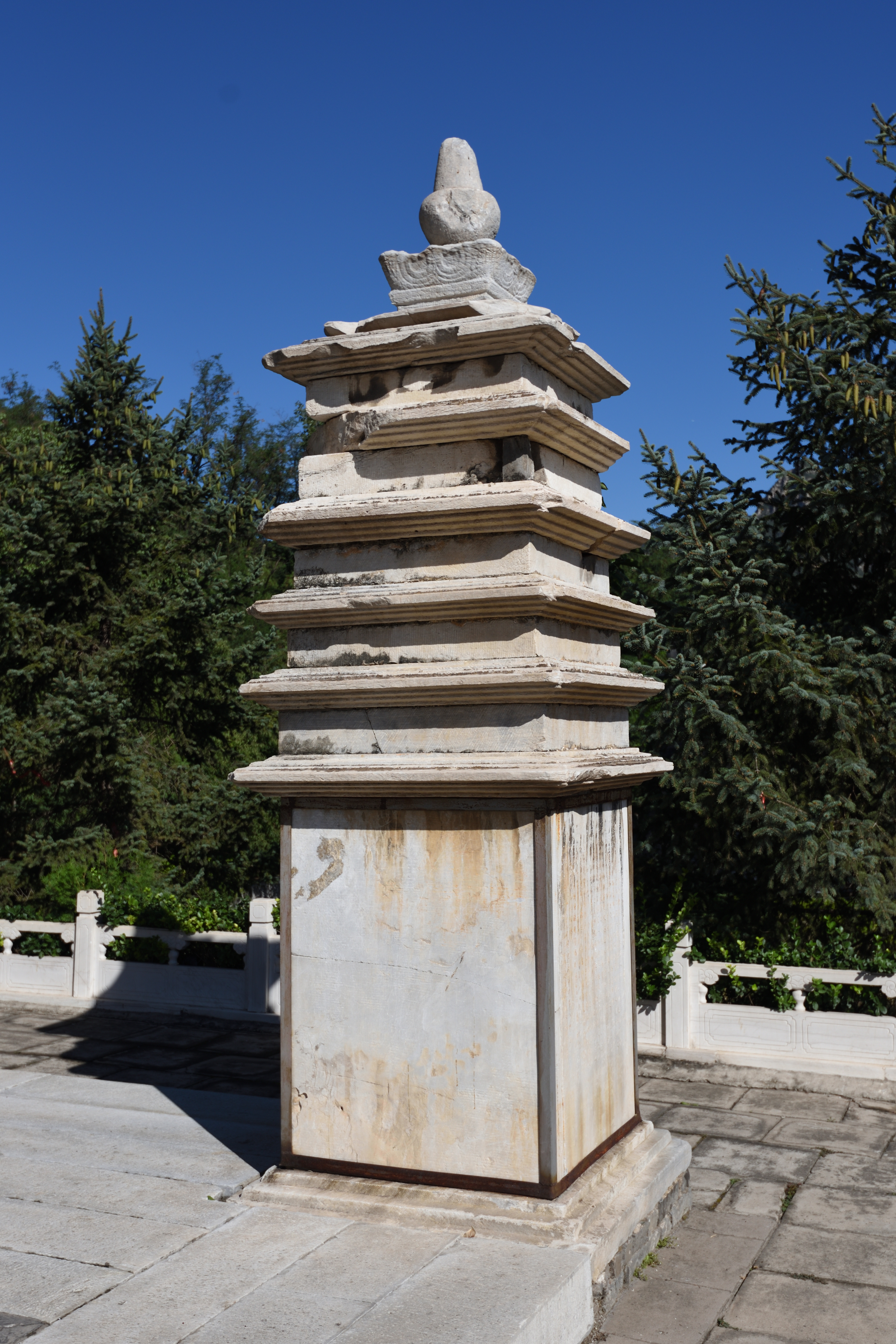
Jingyun Pagoda

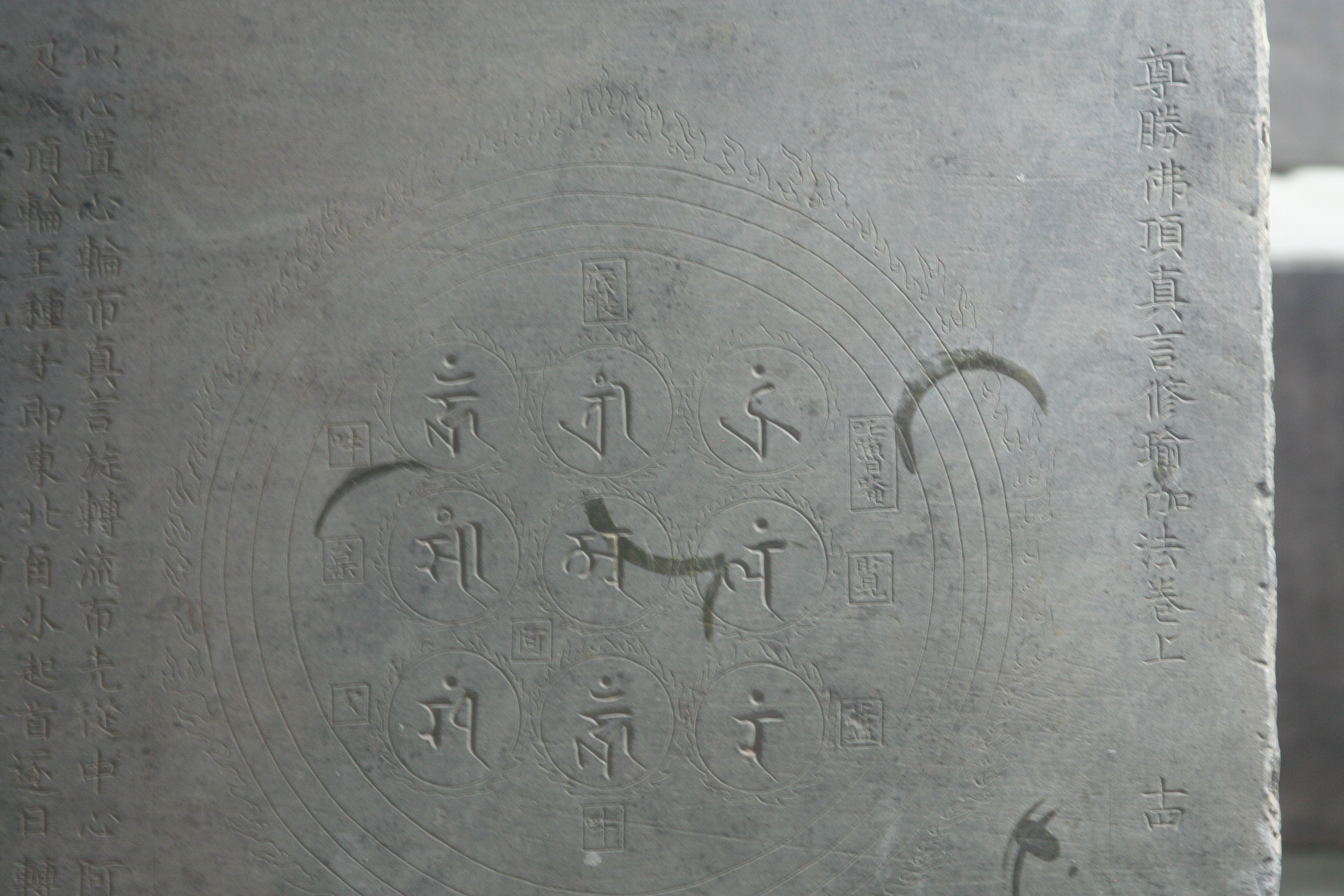
Sanskrit Mantra, part of the Liao-Jin Fangshan Stone Sutra collection

== Sources ==
- CBETA. 房山雲居寺石經──經文、題記、碑銘等拓片之選輯 第2卷 [Fangshan Yunju Temple Stone Sutras – Rubbings of Selected Sutra Text, Descriptive Inscriptions, Stone Stele Inscriptions, etc., Scroll No. 2]. CBETA (in Traditional Chinese).
- Dan Jixiang and Wang Fengjiang (Eds), 2001. Fang Shan Yu Ju Temple Liao Jin Stone Sutras Preservation Record, No ISBN. In Chinese. 《房山云居寺辽金石经回藏纪实》/单霁翔, 王风江 (主编)
- Lan Jifu (Ed), 1985. Supplement to the Dazangjing (Tripitaka), Taipei: Huayu Publishing Co., In Chinese. 《大藏經補編》/藍吉富 (主編)
- Lancaster, Lewis, 1996. Rock Cut Canon in China The Rock Cut Canon in China : Findings at Fang-Shan
- Liao Pin and Wu Wen. The Temples of Beijing. Beijing: Foreign Languages Press, 2006.
- Shi Shengyen (釋聖嚴) (1991). 火宅清涼 [A Cool Wind in a Burning House] (in Traditional Chinese). pp. 112–127.
- 北京 "敦煌"—— 房山石经及云居寺 [Beijing's Dunhuang:Fangshan Stone Sutra and Yunju Temple]. 古詩文翻譯網 [Translation of Ancient Literature Web] (in Simplified Chinese).
- Pagoda, Library Caves and Stone Tablets of sutra of Yunju Temple - UNESCO World Heritage Centre Pagoda, Library Caves and Stone Tablets of Sutra of Yunju Temple – UNESCO World Heritage Center.
