= Cui Yuying =

Chinese politician

- 崔玉英

Chairwoman of the Fujian Provincial Committee of the Chinese People's Political Consultative Conference
- In office 29 January 2018 – 13 January 2023
- Preceded by: Zhang Changping
- Succeeded by: Teng Jiacai

Deputy Head of the Central Publicity Department of the Chinese Communist Party
- In office January 2015 – January 2018
- Head: Liu Qibao

Personal details
- Born: May 1958 (age 68) Changle County, Shandong, China
- Party: Chinese Communist Party
- Education: Tibet Agriculture and Herders College

Cui Yuying (Chinese: 崔玉英; born May 1958) is a Chinese politician of Tibetan ethnicity, serving from January 2015 to January 2018 as the deputy head of the Publicity Department of the Chinese Communist Party and the deputy director of the State Council Information Office (vice-minister level). She was the first ethnic minority deputy head in the Publicity Department's history. Since 29 January 2018, she has served as chairwoman of the Zhejiang Provincial Committee of the Chinese People's Political Consultative Conference.

== Career ==
Cui was born in Changle County, Shandong, but moved to Nyingchi, Tibet, in her youth. She taught elementary school there before enrolling in the department of forestry at the Agriculture and Herders College of Tibet, where she graduated from in 1982. She then went on to complete a study term at the Beijing Forestry University, then returned to Tibet to work in the regional government's planning department, then the audit and economic planning department.

Starting in 1987, Cui began serving at the Tibet division of China Life, where she worked in finance, operations, and motor vehicle insurance. By 1996, she was promoted to vice president of the Tibet division of China Life. In 1999, she was promoted to regional president. As an aspiring and relatively young professional, Cui went on to study at the Central Party School in Beijing and earned a political economics graduate degree there. By July 2002, Cui was named Vice Chairman of the Tibet Autonomous Region, entering the sub-provincial ranks for the first time at 44 years of age. In October 2006, she was elevated again to the regional Party Standing Committee to serve as Tibet regional propaganda chief, entering the inner sanctum of political decision making in Tibet. Her profile was unique because she was a woman of Tibetan heritage; females and ethnic minorities are rarely selected to enter provincial-level standing committees.

In December 2011, she was transferred to Beijing to work for the State Council Information Office as deputy director (vice minister rank), and in January 2015, she was named deputy head of the Central Publicity Department. Cui was the first ethnic-minority deputy propaganda head in the department's history, dating back to the 1920s.
