= Nimitta =

Element of object recognition in Buddhist psychology

In Buddhism a Nimitta is a sign or mark by which someone or something is recognized, identified, known, or defined. Nimitta encompasses a distinguishing mark, appearance, a perceived attribute, as well as what one notes or marks as an object of thought, meditation, or concentration. In the context of meditation, it refers to an image, an internal appearance, total awareness, or a mental impression appearing in the early stages of jhāna as a sign of progress.

Nimitta refers to a general and relatively persistent characteristic in contrast to secondary characteristics. The apprehending of signs enables perception of objects and feeling tones, reinforcing ignorance and leading to suffering.

In addition, the word nimitta is used in Buddhist scriptures to refer to a causal ground (ex. to criticize someone), an auspicious sign or omen, or an outer appearance (ex. a reflection).

== In Theravada ==
In Theravada treatises such as the Visuddhimagga, nimitta refers to mental images that arise during meditation. These images begin with an initial preparation object (parikamma-nimitta) and an unstable form (uggaha-nimitta), and grow progressively more vivid and stable as the meditator becomes more advanced. It is believed that when the image is sufficiently stable (paṭibhāga-nimitta), the state of "access samādhi" (upacāra-samādhi) has been attained and cultivating the image will lead to the attainment of jhāna. Perceiving with the senses without apprehending signs is central to the practice of sense restraint.

It has been noted that earlier treatises such as the Vimuttimagga placed less emphasis on such visual nimitta than contemporary Theravada.

Nimitta in Theravada treatises (and commentaries) can also refer to states of mind on the death bed based on past karma or believed to foretell the dying's future destiny.

== In Mahayana ==
=== Animitta ===
Animitta, or the absence of signs, is one of the Three Gates of Liberation and a form of samadhi in Mahayana Buddhism along with emptiness and wishlessness.

=== Yogacara school ===
In Yogacara philosophy, nimitta refers to the delusion that signs apprehended by the mind correspond to real objects outside the mind. Nimitta-bhaga refers to the conception of something that is seen, the counterpart to the delusion of a self who sees.

== See also ==
- Lakshana
- Samjna (concept)
