= Liu Tong =

Liu Tong (Chinese: 刘侗; Wade–Giles: Liu T'ung, c. 1593–1637) was a Chinese politician and writer from Macheng in Huanggang. He was a figure in the Ming Dynasty's Jingling school (竟陵派) of Chinese prose literature in contrast to the Gongan school (公安派) and the well known Yuan Hongdao and his brothers. He is credited with the Dijing Jingwulue.

His Dijing Jingwulue (帝京景物略), or Resume of Sights and Goods of the Imperial Capital is thought to have been a travel guide to the historical and geographical attractions of Beijing. The work mentions the Catholic cathedral and the tomb of the Jesuit Matteo Ricci. Its anecdotes and unusual details make it an invaluable study of Beijing in the early 17th century. In 1630, Liu became a member of the National University and passed his Jinshi examination in 1634. He became a magistrate of Suzhou, but died en route in 1637.
