= Consular missions in Macau =

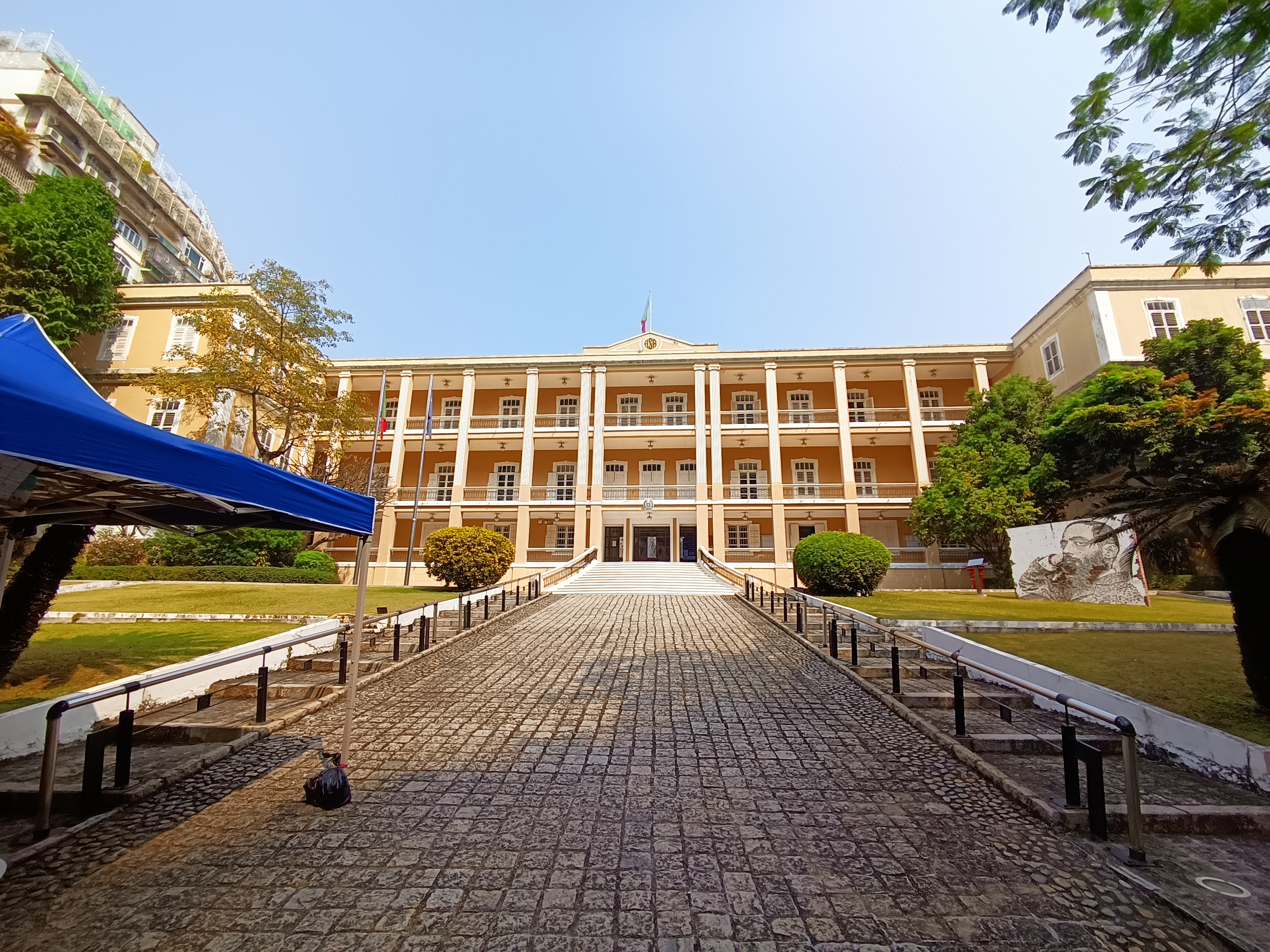
Portuguese consulate general in Macau.

There are 15 consular missions in Macau, of which four are consulates-general, one is a consular office and ten are honorary consuls.

Fifty consulates-general and seven honorary consulates in the Hong Kong Special Administrative Region are also accredited to Macau. Of the nine honorary consulates in Macau, two are subordinate to consulates-general in Hong Kong.

The honorary consulate of Portugal in Hong Kong is subordinate to the consulate-general of Portugal in Macau.

== History ==
When Macau was under Portuguese rule, there was a Brazilian consul but was closed shortly afterwards. During the Second World War, when Macau was under Portuguese rule, there was a British consul, John Pownall Reeves, who served between June 1941 and August 1946. He remained there following the fall of British-ruled Hong Kong to the Japanese, as Portugal was neutral, helping 9,000 British subjects who had become refugees from the Japanese-occupied colony.

The British consulate, which also operated a Hong Kong Government Permit Office, was maintained in Macau until 1967, when, following political unrest the previous December, it was targeted by pro-Communist demonstrators who attempted to make the consul, Norman Ions, repeat anti-British and anti-Portuguese slogans, before it was evacuated and closed.

== Consulates-general ==
- Angola
- Mozambique
- Philippines
- Portugal

== Consular office ==
- Vietnam

== Honorary consulates ==
- Cape Verde
- Estonia
- Grenada
- Guinea
- Guinea-Bissau
- Mali
- Niger
- Peru
- Tanzania
- Timor-Leste

== Consular posts with residence in Hong Kong ==
A

- Argentina – consulate general
- Australia – consulate general
- Austria – consulate general

B

- Bangladesh – consulate general
- Belgium – consulate general
- Brazil – consulate general

C

- Cambodia – consulate general
- Canada – consulate general
- Chile – consulate general
- Colombia – consulate general
- Cyprus
- Czech Republic – consulate general

E

- Egypt – consulate general
- Eritrea – honorary consulate
- Ethiopia – honorary consulate
- European Union – Office of the European Commission

F

- Finland – consulate general
- France – consulate general

G

- Germany – consulate general
- Greece – consulate general

H

- Hungary – consulate general

I

- India – consulate general
- Indonesia – consulate general
- Iran – consulate general
- Ireland – consulate general^{†}
- Israel – consulate general
- Italy – consulate general

J

- Japan – consulate general

K

- Kazakhstan – consulate general
- Kenya – honorary consulate
- South Korea – consulate general

L

- Laos – consulate general

M

- Malaysia – consulate general
- Mexico – consulate general
- Myanmar – consulate general

N

- Namibia – honorary consulate
- Nepal – consulate general
- Netherlands – consulate general
- New Zealand – consulate general
- Nigeria – consulate general
- Norway – honorary consulate

P

- Pakistan – consulate general
- Peru – consulate general
- Poland – consulate general

R

- Romania – consulate general
- Russia – consulate general

S

- Saudi Arabia – consulate general
- Singapore – consulate general
- South Africa – consulate general
- Spain – consulate general
- Sri Lanka – honorary consulate
- Sweden – consulate general
- Switzerland – consulate general

T

- Thailand – consulate general
- Turkey – consulate general

U

- United Kingdom – consulate-general
- United States – consulate general
- Uruguay – honorary consulate

V

- Venezuela – consulate general
- Vietnam – consulate general

== Countries without missions ==
The following countries, which have diplomatic relations with the People's Republic of China, do not presently have representation in either Macau or Hong Kong, but have proposed establishing consulates:

- Antigua and Barbuda
- Armenia
- Solomon Islands

The following countries, which have diplomatic relations with Taiwan, do not have consulates in Hong Kong or Macau, but has non-resident mission in other countries:

- Paraguay (Tokyo)

== Relations with Mainland China ==
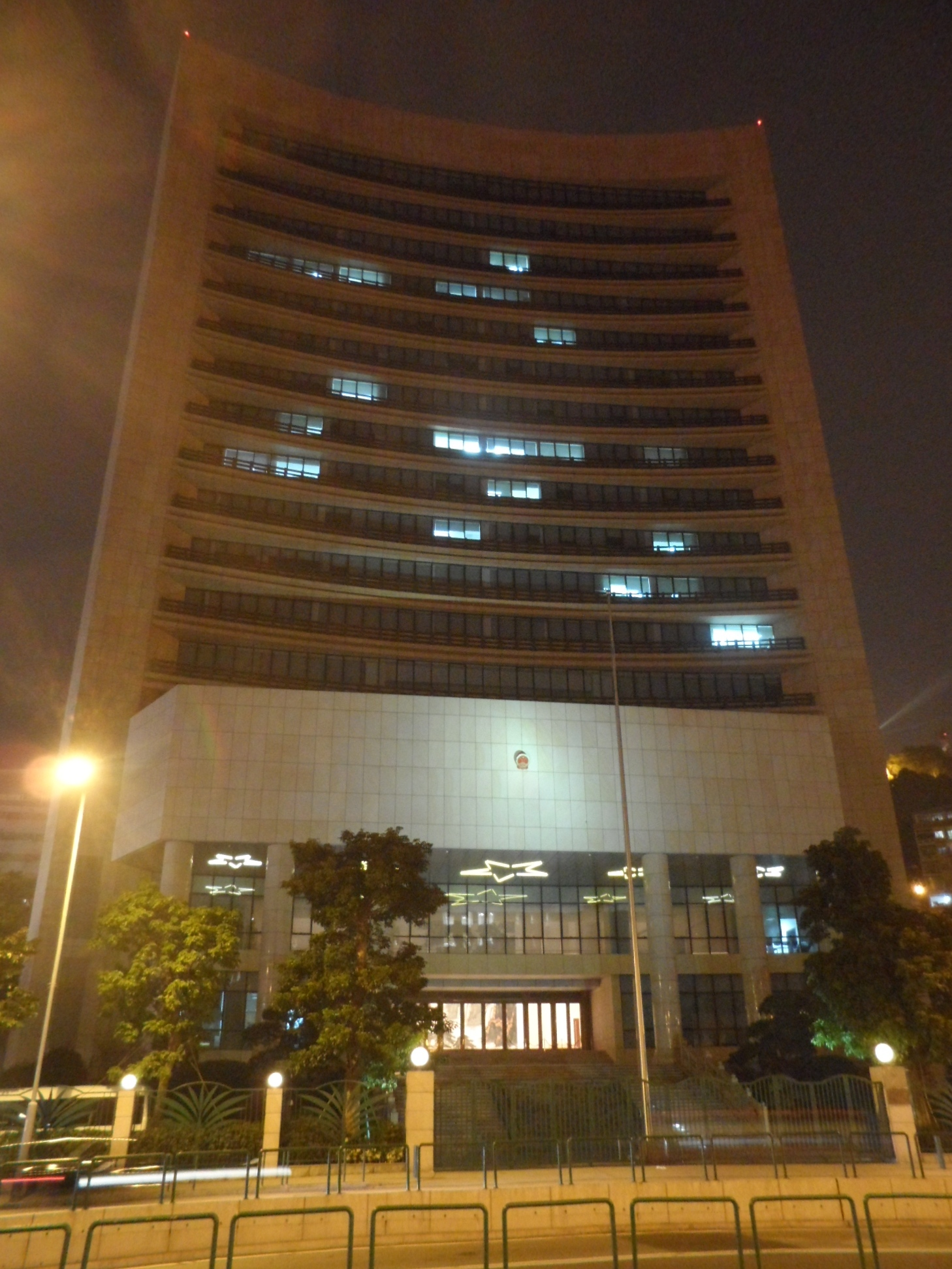
Liaison Office of the Central People's Government in the Macau SAR

The Liaison Office of the Central People's Government in the Macao Special Administrative Region is the representative office of the central government of the People's Republic of China in Macau. It was established on September 21, 1987, as a branch of Xinhua News Agency. It adopted its present name on January 18, 2000.

== Relations with Taiwan ==
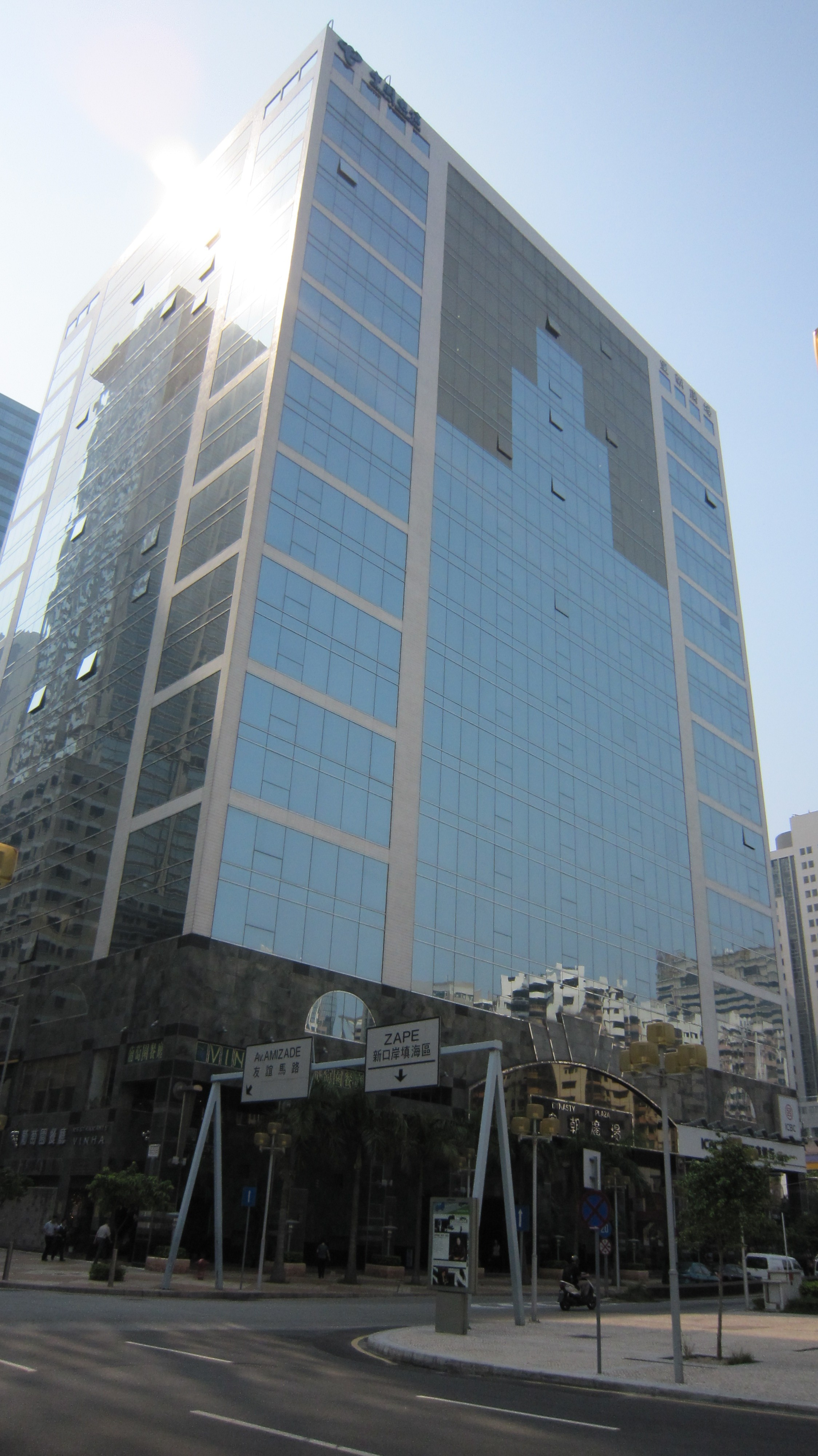
Dynasty Plaza building houses the Taipei Economic and Cultural Office in Macau.

The Taipei Economic and Cultural Office, known as the Taipei Trade and Tourism Office in Macau between 1989 and 1999 and the Taipei Economic and Cultural Center in Macau between 1999 and 2011, is a de facto mission of the Republic of China in Macau.

== See also ==
- Foreign relations of Macau
- Consular missions in Hong Kong
- Office of the Commissioner of the Ministry of Foreign Affairs of the People's Republic of China in the Macao Special Administrative Region
