= Central Leading Group on Hong Kong and Macau Affairs =

Chinese Communist Party body

- 中央港澳工作领导小组; Zhōngyāng Gǎng Ào Gōngzuò Lǐngdǎo Xiǎozǔ
- Emblem of the Chinese Communist Party

Agency overview
- Formed: August 1978; 48 years ago
- Jurisdiction: Chinese Communist Party
- Headquarters: Beijing
- Agency executives: Ding Xuexiang, Leader; Xia Baolong, Executive Deputy Leader; Chen Wenqing, Deputy Leader; Shi Taifeng, Deputy Leader; Wang Xiaohong, Deputy Leader; Wang Yi, Deputy Leader; Xia Baolong, Deputy Leader
- Parent agency: Central Committee of the Chinese Communist Party
- Child agency: Hong Kong and Macau Affairs Office

Central Leading Group on Hong Kong and Macau Affairs
- Simplified Chinese: 中央港澳工作领导小组
- Traditional Chinese: 中央港澳工作領導小組
Transcriptions
Standard Mandarin
- Hanyu Pinyin: Zhōngyāng Gǎng Ào Gōngzuò Lǐngdǎo Xiǎozǔ
Yue: Cantonese
- Jyutping: zung1 joeng1 gong2 ou3 gung1 zok3 ling5 dou6 siu2 zou2

The Central Leading Group on Hong Kong and Macau Affairs is an internal policy coordination group of the Central Committee of the Chinese Communist Party (CCP), reporting to the CCP Politburo, in charge of supervising and coordinating Beijing's policies towards the Special Administrative Regions of Hong Kong and Macau.

The Group was established as the Central Coordination Group for Hong Kong and Macau Affairs in 1978. In 2020, the group was upgraded from a Central Coordination Group to a Central Leading Group. The Group is the highest body for China's policy towards Hong Kong and Macau. Since 2003, the group has always been led by a member of the CCP Politburo Standing Committee. The General Office for the group is also known as the Hong Kong and Macau Affairs Office.

== History ==
The Group was established as the Central Group on Hong Kong and Macao on 17 August 1978 though an informal Hong Kong-Macau affairs group had formed much earlier.

In order to deal with increasingly serious July 1 marches in Hong Kong in 2003, then Politburo Standing Committee (PSC) member and Vice President Zeng Qinghong became leader of the group that year, and China's policy towards the SARs underwent significant reforms. It was upgraded to the Central Coordination Group on Hong Kong and Macao Affairs. Most notably, the group enacted the Mainland and Hong Kong Closer Economic Partnership Arrangement (CEPA) and the Mainland and Macau Closer Economic Partnership Arrangement, preferential trade agreements, and the Individual Visit Scheme, which allowed mainlanders to visit Hong Kong and Macau on an individual basis without having to apply for group visas or go through officially approved tour groups.

In 2020, in the context of the 2019–2020 Hong Kong protests, the group was upgraded from a Central Coordination Group to a Central Leading Group. Under a series of institutional reforms in 2023, the Hong Kong and Macau Affairs Office of the State Council became the external name of the "Hong Kong and Macau Work Office of the Central Committee of the Chinese Communist Party".

== Functions ==
The Central Leading Group is the CCP's top decision-making body in regards to Hong Kong and Macau. It reports to the Politburo and the Politburo Standing Committee, which discuss and approve top-level policies regarding Hong Kong and Macau.

The Hong Kong and Macau Work Office is the executive arm of the Central Leading Group, responsible for researching, coordinating between national and local governments, and supervising the implementation of Hong Kong and Macau affairs related policies, such as the one country, two systems framework and national security. The Hong Kong and Macau Affairs Office of the State Council, previously a separate unit, is the external name of the Office.

== Membership ==
Since 2003, the group has always been led by a member of the PSC. The leader of the Central Leading Group is generally the First Vice Premier, with the Minister of Public Security and director of the Hong Kong and Macau Work Office serving as deputy leaders. Other members generally include head of the United Front Work Department, director of the Office of the Central Foreign Affairs Commission, the Minister of Foreign Affairs, the CCP Committee secretary and governor of Guangdong, and the directors of the Hong Kong and Macau Liaison Offices.

=== Leadership ===
1. Zeng Qinghong (July 2003–October 2007)
2. Xi Jinping (October 2007–November 2012)
3. Zhang Dejiang (November 2012–April 2018)
4. Han Zheng (April 2018–March 2023)
5. Ding Xuexiang (March 2023 –)

=== 19th Central Committee ===
- Leader
  - Han Zheng, Politburo Standing Committee member, First Vice Premier of the State Council
- Deputy Leaders
  - Guo Shengkun, Politburo member, Secretary of the Central Political and Legal Affairs Commission (joined in 2019)
  - Wang Yi, State Councilor, Minister of Foreign Affairs
  - Xia Baolong, Director of the Hong Kong and Macau Affairs Office
  - Yang Jiechi, Politburo member, Director of the Central Foreign Affairs Commission Office
  - You Quan, Secretariat member, Head of the United Front Work Department
  - Zhao Kezhi, State Councilor, Minister of Public Security (joined in 2019)
- Members
  - Li Xi, Politburo member, Party Secretary of Guangdong
  - Zheng Yanxiong, Director of the Hong Kong Liaison Office
  - Zheng Xincong, Director of the Macau Liaison Office
  - Wang Weizhong, Governor of Guangdong

=== 20th Central Committee ===
- Leader
  - Ding Xuexiang, Politburo Standing Committee member, First Vice Premier of the State Council
- Executive Deputy Leader
  - Xia Baolong, Director of the Hong Kong and Macau Work Office
- Deputy Leaders
  - Chen Wenqing, Politburo member, Secretary of the Central Political and Legal Affairs Commission
  - Shi Taifeng, Politburo member, Head of the United Front Work Department
  - Wang Yi, Politburo member, Director of the Central Foreign Affairs Commission Office, Minister of Foreign Affairs
  - Wang Xiaohong, State Councilor, Minister of Public Security
- Members
  - Huang Kunming, Politburo member, Party Secretary of Guangdong
  - Zheng Yanxiong, Director of the Hong Kong Liaison Office
  - Zheng Xincong, Director of the Macau Liaison Office
  - Wang Weizhong, Governor of Guangdong

== See also ==
- Hong Kong and Macau Affairs Office
- Central Leading Group for Taiwan Affairs
