= Office of the Commissioner =

Office of the Commissioner may refer to:

- Office of the Commissioner (Hong Kong), officially the Office of the Commissioner of the Ministry of Foreign Affairs of the People's Republic of China in the Hong Kong Special Administrative Region
- Office of the Commissioner (Macau), officially the Office of the Commissioner of the Ministry of Foreign Affairs of the People's Republic of China in the Macau Special Administrative Region
