= Foreign relations of China (disambiguation) =

Foreign relations of China may refer to:

== Sovereign states ==
- Foreign relations of China, People's Republic of
  - Foreign relations of Hong Kong
  - Foreign relations of Macau
- Foreign relations of China, Republic of (Taiwan)

== Historical countries ==
- Foreign relations of Imperial China
