= Guo Dongpo =

Chinese politician

- 郭东坡

Chairperson of the Liaison with Hong Kong, Macao, Taiwan and Overseas Chinese Committee of the Chinese People's Political Consultative Conference
- In office 15 March 2003 – 15 March 2008
- Preceded by: Zhu Xun
- Succeeded by: Chen Yunlin

Director of the Overseas Chinese Affairs Office
- In office August 1997 – December 2002
- Premier: Li Peng; Zhu Rongji
- Preceded by: Liao Hui
- Succeeded by: Chen Yujie

President of the China Council for the Promotion of International Trade
- In office June 1995 – September 1997
- Preceded by: Zheng Hongye
- Succeeded by: Yu Xiaosong

Personal details
- Born: August 1937 (age 89) Jiangdu County, Jiangsu, China
- Party: Chinese Communist Party
- Education: University of International Business and Economics

Chinese name
- Simplified Chinese: 郭东坡
- Traditional Chinese: 郭東坡
Transcriptions
Standard Mandarin
- Hanyu Pinyin: Guō Dōngpō

Guo Dongpo (Chinese: 郭东坡; born August 1937) is a Chinese politician who served as president of the China Council for the Promotion of International Trade from 1995 to 1997 and director of the Overseas Chinese Affairs Office from 1997 to 2003.

He was an alternate member of the 14th Central Committee of the Chinese Communist Party and a member of the 15th Central Committee of the Chinese Communist Party. He was a member of the 7th National Committee of the Chinese People's Political Consultative Conference and a member of the Standing Committee of the 8th and 10th Chinese People's Political Consultative Conference.

== Biography ==
Guo was born into a family of farming background in the town of Yiling, Jiangdu County (now Jiangdu District of Yangzhou), Jiangsu, in August 1937. He secondary studied at the Yangzhou High School of Jiangsu Province. In 1958, he entered Beijing Institute of Foreign Trade (now University of International Business and Economics), majoring in international trade. He stayed and worked at the university after graduation.

Guo joined the Chinese Communist Party (CCP) in May 1960. Starting in 1972, he served in several posts in the China Council for the Promotion of International Trade, where he was eventually promoted to president in June 1995. He was appointed president of the Xinhua News Agency Macao Branch in 1990, concurrently serving as deputy director of the Macao Basic Law Drafting Committee. He became director of the Overseas Chinese Affairs Office in August 1997, serving in the post until his retirement in December 2002. In March 2003, he was chosen as chairperson of the Liaison with Hong Kong, Macao, Taiwan and Overseas Chinese Committee of the Chinese People's Political Consultative Conference.

Business positions
Preceded by Zheng Hongye	President of the China Council for the Promotion of International Trade; 1995–1997	Succeeded by Yu Xiaosong
Government offices
Preceded by Liao Hui	Director of the Overseas Chinese Affairs Office; 1997–2002	Succeeded by Chen Yujie
Assembly seats
Preceded by Zhu Xun	Chairperson of the Liaison with Hong Kong, Macao, Taiwan and Overseas Chinese Committee of the Chinese People's Political Consultative Conference; 2003–2008	Succeeded by Chen Yunlin
