= Committee for Liaison with Hong Kong, Macao, Taiwan and Overseas Chinese =

Special Committee of the CPPCC National Committee

- 中国人民政治协商会议全国委员会 港澳台侨委员会
- Formation: March 16, 1998; 28 years ago
- Type: Special committee of the CPPCC
- Location: Beijing
- Chairperson: Liu Cigui
- Parent organization: National Committee of the Chinese People's Political Consultative Conference

Chinese name
- Simplified Chinese: 中国人民政治协商会议全国委员会港澳台侨委员会
- Traditional Chinese: 中國人民政治協商會議全國委員會港澳臺僑委員會
Transcriptions
Standard Mandarin
- Hanyu Pinyin: Zhōngguó Rénmín Zhèngzhì Xiéshāng Huìyì Quánguó Wěiyuánhuì Gǎng Ào Tái Qiáo Wěiyuánhuì

Shortest form
- Simplified Chinese: 全国政协港澳台侨委员会
- Traditional Chinese: 全國政協港澳臺僑委員會
Transcriptions
Standard Mandarin
- Hanyu Pinyin: Quánguó Zhèngxié Gǎng Ào Tái Qiáo Wěiyuánhuì

The Committee for Liaison with Hong Kong, Macao, Taiwan and Overseas Chinese is one of ten special committees of the National Committee of the Chinese People's Political Consultative Conference, China's top political advisory body and a central part of the Chinese Communist Party's united front system.

== History ==
The Liaison with Hong Kong, Macao, Taiwan and Overseas Chinese Committee was created in March 1998 during the 9th National Committee of the Chinese People's Political Consultative Conference.

== List of chairpersons ==
No.	Chairpersons	Took office	Left office	Notes
7th	Lu Jiaxi	June 1988	21 May 1993	
7th	Qian Weichang	June 1988	21 May 1993	
8th	Dong Yinchu	21 May 1993	16 March 1998	
8th	Wang Zhaoguo	21 May 1993	1 July 1994	
8th	Wan Guoquan	1 July 1994	16 March 1998	
8th	Dong Yinchu	15 March 1995	16 March 1998	
9th	Zhu Xun	16 March 1998	16 March 2003	
10th	Guo Dongpo	16 March 2003	15 March 2008	
11th	Chen Yunlin	15 March 2008	13 March 2013	
12th	Yang Chonghui	13 March 2013	31 August 2016	
12th	Sun Huaishan	31 August 2016	10 March 2017	
12th	Yang Yanyin	28 June 2017	16 March 2018	
13th	Zhu Xiaodan	16 March 2018	13 March 2023	
14th	Liu Cigui	13 March 2023	Incumbent	

== See also ==
- United front in Hong Kong
- United front in Taiwan
- Overseas Chinese Affairs Committee
