= Wang Zhimin =

Chinese politician

- 王志民
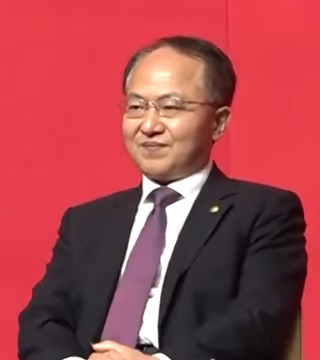

Director of the Liaison Office of the Central People's Government in Hong Kong
- In office 22 September 2017 – 4 January 2020
- Premier: Li Keqiang
- Leader: Zhang Dejiang → Han Zheng
- Preceded by: Zhang Xiaoming
- Succeeded by: Luo Huining

Director of Liaison Office of the Central People's Government in Macau
- In office 20 July 2016 – 22 September 2017
- Premier: Li Keqiang
- Leader: Zhang Dejiang
- Preceded by: Li Gang
- Succeeded by: Zheng Xiaosong

Personal details
- Born: 8 August 1957 (age 69) Xianyou County, Fujian, China
- Party: Chinese Communist Party
- Education: Fujian Normal University
- Occupation: Politician

Wang Zhimin (Chinese: 王志民; pinyin: Wáng Zhìmín; born 8 August 1957) is a Chinese politician, a member of the 19th Central Committee of the Chinese Communist Party and vice president of the Central Institute for Party History and Literature Research. He was the Director of the Liaison Office of the Central People's Government in Hong Kong and Liaison Office of the Central People's Government in Macao.

== Biography ==
With a family root in Fujian, Wang was educated at the Fujian Normal University and became a member of the Fujian Provincial Committee of the Chinese Communist Party (CCP). From 1992 to 1998, he served at the New China News Agency Hong Kong Branch. In 1998, he returned to Fujian to serve as the assistant to the Mayor of Xiamen and other bureaux when Xi Jinping, later becoming General Secretary of the Chinese Communist Party, was the Governor of Fujian. In 2006, he became the Deputy Secretary-general of the Liaison Office of the Central People's Government in Hong Kong until 2015 when he became Deputy Director of the Hong Kong and Macao Affairs Office. From 2016 to 2017, he was the Director of the Liaison Office of the Central People's Government in Macau.

In 2017, he replaced Zhang Xiaoming to become the Director of the Liaison Office of the Central People's Government in Hong Kong. In January 2020 he was dismissed and replaced by Luo Huining, reportedly for misleading the leadership in Beijing about the extent of support for the ongoing protests in Hong Kong and for thus failing to foresee the opposition win by the Pro-democracy camp and localist camp in the 2019 local elections. After he dismissed, he was appointed as the vice President of the Institute of Party History and Literature of the CPC Central Committee in ministerial level.

== Controversies ==
In April 2018, Wang said in a speech that Hong Kong residents needed to respect and understand the Chinese constitution, as it is the "root and foundation" of its future following the amendment of Article 1 of the Chinese constitution to denote the CCP leadership as "the most essential feature of socialism with Chinese characteristics". Targeting the pro-democrats' slogan of calling for the end of "one party dictatorship" since the 1989 Tiananmen Square protests and massacre. Wang said "If you oppose this system, you are overturning our one country, two systems. This is a crime committed against Hong Kong people. It will not bring blessings to Hong Kong, but calamity."

Government offices
Preceded by Li Gang	Director of Liaison Office of the Central People's Government in Macau; 2016–2017	Succeeded by Zheng Xiaosong
Preceded by Zhang Xiaoming	Director of Liaison Office of the Central People's Government in Hong Kong; 2017–2020	Succeeded by Luo Huining
