= John Pownall Reeves =

British Consul to Macau (Portuguese Colony) 1941-46

John Pownall Reeves (1909–1978) was a British diplomat. He was a member of the British China Consul Service posted as British Consul to the Portuguese colony of Macau in southern China during World War II, from 1941 to 1946.

== Education ==
Born in London, Reeves attended Cambridge University where he rowed and played hockey.

== Career ==
Reeves joined the British Foreign Service in 1933 as a "student interpreter" (language student) in Peking (now known as Beijing). After postings in Mukden and Hankow, both in China, he was posted to Macau in 1941.

The Japanese soon declared war on the West with attacks on Pearl Harbor and Hong Kong. But because Portugal was neutral, Macau was not attacked and become a tiny island of neutrality, surrounded by Japanese-occupied China. This was in part because while it had little military value, it was seen by the Japanese Consul, Fukui Yasumitsu, as having value for collection of intelligence. Macau in 1935 had a population of 150,000; by 1940 it had swelled to 300,000, with the increase almost entirely refugees, largely from China. The Portuguese Governor of Macau, Gabriel Maurício Teixeira, welcomed refugees, despite the fact that virtually all food, fuel, and other essentials were imported, making caring for the refugee was a challenge.

Reeves found himself the only senior representative of the Allies within a radius of thousands of miles. He ran spy rings, collected intelligence, smuggled people to freedom, took care of refugees and was threatened with assassination. Reeves cared for more than 5,000 refugees with British citizenship or nationality, including ethnic Indians and Chinese, and helped 300 people escape from Japanese controlled areas.

Reeves was perceived by his superiors as overstepping - particularly with regard to his attempts to run spy networks separately from the British Army Aid Group (BAAG), as documented by correspondence within the British Foreign Service discussing how to control his activities. He was also considered indiscreet by colleagues and the BAAG. Yet "The fact remains that he was the right man, at the right time, to perform the humanitarian task which history entrusted to him [helping refugees]."

Reeves was awarded OBE by the British Government in the 1946 New Year Honours and was honoured by the Portuguese Government for his work in Macau. After the war he was posted to war ravaged areas of Italy, and then to Surabaya. He completed a manuscript of his memoir of the Macau years, The Lone Flag, in January 1949, while he was posted to Rome, but the Foreign Office refused permission for its publication. It was eventually published in 2014.

== Personal life ==
Reeves married Rhoda Murray Kidd in Hankow in 1936. They had one child, Letitia Mary, in 1937.

Rhoda and Letitia went to England in September 1946, and Reeves never saw them again. He resigned from the Consul Service after a few months in Surabaya and retired to South Africa. There he lived until his death in Malmsebury, South Africa in 1978.
