= Macau Office in Beijing =

Representative office of Macau in Beijing, China

Coordinates: 39°54′42″N 116°25′40″E

Office of the Macau Special Administrative Region in Beijing
- 澳門特別行政區駐北京辦事處 澳门特别行政区驻北京办事处; Delegação da Região Administrativa Especial de Macau em Pequim

Agency overview
- Formed: 9 July 2001
- Jurisdiction: Mainland China
- Headquarters: 16th Floor, Macau Center, No. 8 Wangfujing East Street, Dongcheng District, Beijing, China
- Website: Official website (in Chinese)

Macau Office in Beijing
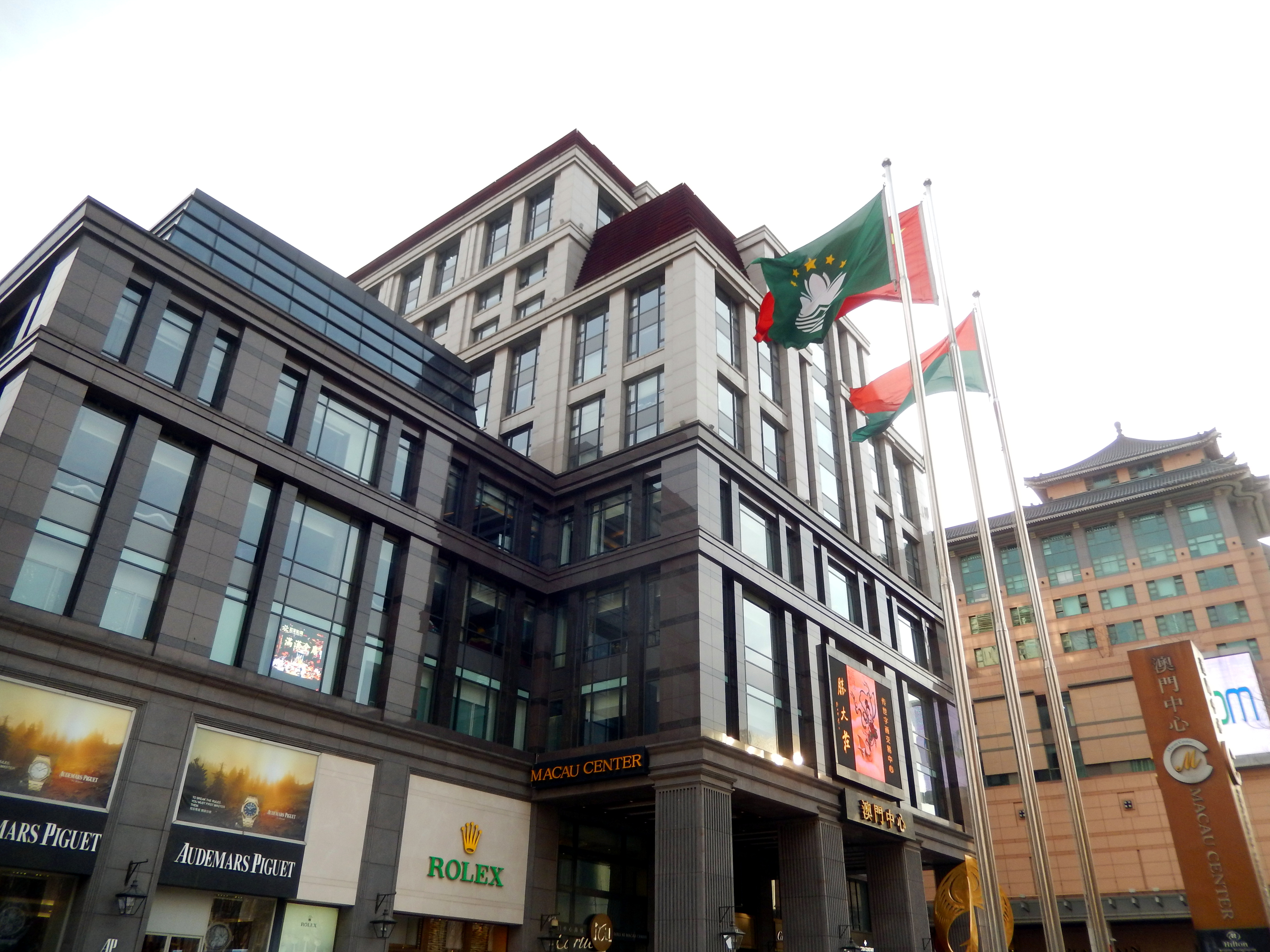
- Macau Center in Wangfujing, Beijing, where the office is located.

Chinese name
- Traditional Chinese: 澳門特別行政區駐北京辦事處
- Simplified Chinese: 澳门特别行政区驻北京办事处
Transcriptions
Standard Mandarin
- Hanyu Pinyin: Àomén Tèbiéxíngzhèngqū zhù Běijīng Bànshìchù
Yue: Cantonese
- Jyutping: ou3 mun4*2 dak6 bit6 hang4 zing3 keoi1 zyu3 bak1 ging1 baan6 si6 cyu3

Portuguese name
- Portuguese: Delegação da Região Administrativa Especial de Macau em Pequim

The Office of the Macau Special Administrative Region in Beijing (Note: simplified Chinese: 澳门特别行政区驻北京办事处; traditional Chinese: 澳門特別行政區駐北京辦事處; pinyin: Àomén Tèbié Xíngzhèngqū Zhù Běijīng Bànshìchù; Portuguese: Delegação da Região Administrativa Especial de Macau em Pequim) is the representative office of the government of Macau in Beijing, the capital of China.

Its counterpart office is the Liaison Office of the Central People's Government in the Macao Special Administrative Region, representative office of the Central Government of the People's Republic of China in Macau.

== Transportation ==
The office is accessible within walking distance southwest from Dengshikou Station of the Beijing Subway.

== See also ==
- Macau Economic and Cultural Office
- Foreign relations of Macau
- Office of the Government of the Hong Kong Special Administrative Region in Beijing
- One country, two systems
