= Zheng Xiaosong =

Chinese politician and diplomat

- 郑晓松

Director of the Macau Liaison Office
- In office September 2017 – 20 October 2018
- Premier: Li Keqiang
- Preceded by: Wang Zhimin
- Succeeded by: Fu Ziying

Secretary-general of the Chinese Communist Party's Fujian Provincial Committee (Note: This position should not be confused with the similarly-titled but more powerful job of Fujian Chinese Communist Party Provincial Committee Secretary (福建省委书记), colloquially termed the "Fujian Party Chief", who was You Quan (尤权) from 2012 to 2017.)
- In office April 2016 – June 2016
- Party Secretary: You Quan
- Preceded by: Ye Shuangyu
- Succeeded by: Liang Jianyong

Director of the International Department of the Chinese Ministry of Finance
- In office 2007 – April 2012
- Minister: Xie Xuren
- Preceded by: Zhu Guangyao
- Succeeded by: Zou Jiayi

Personal details
- Born: September 1959 Beijing, China
- Died: October 20, 2018 (aged 59) Sé, Macau, China
- Party: Chinese Communist Party
- Education: University of Oslo; University of Oxford
- Occupation: Politician

Chinese name
- Traditional Chinese: 鄭曉松
- Simplified Chinese: 郑晓松
Transcriptions
Standard Mandarin
- Hanyu Pinyin: Zhèng Xiǎosōng
- Wade–Giles: Cheng Hsiao-sung
- IPA: [ʈʂə̂ŋ ɕjàʊsʊ́ŋ]
Yue: Cantonese
- Yale Romanization: Jehng Híu Chùhng
- Jyutping: Zeng^{6} Hiu^{2} Cung^{4}

Zheng Xiaosong (Chinese: 郑晓松; September 1959 – 20 October 2018) was a Chinese politician and diplomat. He was Director of the Macau Liaison Office, a ministerial-level position, until he fell to his death from his residence in October 2018. He formerly served as Deputy Director of the International Liaison Department of the Chinese Communist Party, Vice Governor of Fujian Province, and secretary-general of the Fujian Provincial Committee of the Chinese Communist Party (CCP).

Zheng was a member of the 19th Central Committee of the Chinese Communist Party and a delegate to the 13th National People's Congress.

== Life and career ==
Zheng was born in September 1959 in Beijing, China. He graduated from the University of Oslo with a degree in Norwegian language and received diplomatic training at the University of Oxford from 1996 to 1997.

For most of his career Zheng served in diplomatic and international finance positions, including first-grade secretary of the Western Europe Bureau of the Chinese Ministry of Foreign Affairs, Director of the International Department of the Chinese Ministry of Finance, Assistant Finance Minister, and Chinese Executive Director of the Asian Development Bank.

Zheng was promoted to major political posts after Party General Secretary Xi Jinping came to power in 2012. He was appointed Vice Governor of Fujian Province in July 2013, and later became a member of the standing committee and secretary-general of the Fujian Provincial Committee of the Chinese Communist Party (CCP).

In 2016, Zheng was transferred back to Beijing to serve as Deputy Director of the International Liaison Department of the Chinese Communist Party. A month before the 19th National Congress of the Chinese Communist Party (CCP), he was promoted to Director of the Macau Liaison Office, a ministerial-level position in charge of relations between the central government and the Macau Special Administrative Region. He was elected as a member of the 19th Central Committee of the CCP.

== Death ==
On 20 October 2018, Zheng died in Macau after falling from a tall building where he lived. He was 59. The Hong Kong and Macau Affairs Office in Beijing issued a statement saying that he had suffered from depression, with the implication that he had committed suicide. On Chinese social media many expressed concern and sadness about his depression, but others noted that at least 7 other Chinese officials have fallen from buildings this year, with one injured and at least 6 dead. Although there is no evidence that Zheng was suspected of corruption, in recent years hundreds of mid-level Chinese officials accused of corruption have died, reportedly by suicide, although observers have doubted such accounts.

=== Allegation related to visit by Xi Jinping ===
Zheng died just days before the 23 October opening of the Hong Kong–Zhuhai–Macau Bridge, the world's longest sea crossing linking Macau and Hong Kong. Bruce Lui Ping-kuen, convener of Hong Kong's Independent Commentators Association, claimed that in order to avoid speculation that might disturb Party General Secretary Xi Jinping's visit for the opening of the bridge, Beijing had been too quick to conclude that Zheng had died while suffering from depression, a conclusion they announced even before the completion of the investigation by the Macao police. Such reported suicides have been much more common during Xi's leadership than during that of his predecessor Hu Jintao. The Hong Kong and Macau Affairs Office, which announced that his death had been due to depression, has been investigated for corruption since 2016 by the Central Commission for Discipline Inspection and criticized by it for its "six sins", and other Hong Kong and Macao official organizations have also been suspected of corruption.

== Footnotes ==
Party political offices
Previous: Ye Shuangyu (叶双瑜)	Secretary-general of the Chinese Communist Party's Fujian Provincial Committee; 2016-2016	Next: Liang Jianyong (梁建勇)
Government offices
Previous: Zhu Guangyao (朱光耀)	Director of the International Department of the Chinese Ministry of Finance; 2007–2012	Next: Zou Jiayi (邹加怡)
Previous: Wang Zhimin	Director of the Macau Liaison Office; 2017–2018	Next: Fu Ziying
