= Fu Ziying =

Chinese politician

- 傅自应
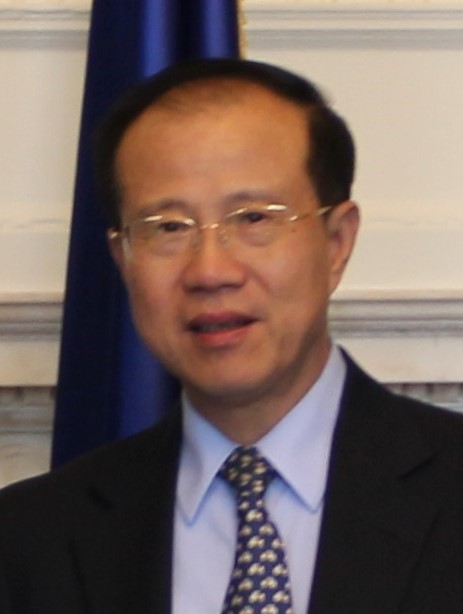
- Fu Ziying, Vice-Chairman of Foreign affairs Committee of the People's Republic of China, on 16 October 2024

Director of the Macau Liaison Office
- In office 28 December 2018 – 30 May 2022
- Preceded by: Zheng Xiaosong
- Succeeded by: Zheng Xincong

Vice-Governor of Jiangsu
- In office November 2011 – March 2015
- Governor: Li Xueyong

Personal details
- Born: September 1957 (age 69) Yueyang, Hunan, China
- Party: Chinese Communist Party
- Education: Hunan University

Chinese name
- Traditional Chinese: 傅自應
- Simplified Chinese: 傅自应
Transcriptions
Standard Mandarin
- Hanyu Pinyin: Fù Zìyìng

Fu Ziying (Chinese: 傅自应; born September 1957) is a Chinese politician who served as director of the Macau Liaison Office from 2018 to 2022.

He was a delegate to the 19th National Congress of the Chinese Communist Party and an alternate of the 19th Central Committee of the Chinese Communist Party.

== Biography ==
Fu was born in Yueyang, Hunan, in September 1957. He entered the workforce in October 1974, and joined the Chinese Communist Party in July 1992. At the age of 17, he became a sent-down youth in the Down to the Countryside Movement. After the resumption of College Entrance Examination in September 1978, he entered the Hunan Finance and Economics Institute. He also studied at the Boston University and John F. Kennedy School of Government. After university in 1981, he was assigned to the Ministry of Foreign Trad. In 2003, he was promoted to become assistant minister of the newly established Ministry of Commerce. Five years later, he was promoted again to become the deputy minister, a position at vice-ministerial level. In November 2011 he was transferred to Nanjing, capital of east China's Jiangsu province, as its vice-governor of Jiangsu. In March 2015, he returned to Beijing, and was appointed head of Discipline Inspection Unit of the Central Commission for Discipline Inspection in the Publicity Department of the Chinese Communist Party. In February 2017, he returned to the Ministry of Commerce as Deputy Party Branch Secretary. On December 28, 2018, he was appointed director of the Macau Liaison Office, replacing Zheng Xiaosong, who died of depression in Macau after falling from a tall building where he lived.

Government offices
Preceded by Zheng Xiaosong	Director of the Macau Liaison Office; 2018–2022	Succeeded by Zheng Xincong
