= The Lone Flag =

- Traditional Chinese: 孤獨的旗幟：二戰期間英國駐澳門領事瑞維斯回憶錄
- Simplified Chinese: 孤独的旗帜：二战期间英国驻澳门领事瑞维斯回忆录
Transcriptions
Standard Mandarin
- Hanyu Pinyin: Gūdú de Qízhì: Èrzhàn qījiān Yīngguó zhù Àomén lǐngshì Ruìwéisī huíyìlù

First edition

The Lone Flag: Memoir of the British Consul in Macao during World War II, a 2014 nonfiction English language book published by Hong Kong University Press, is a memoir by John Pownall Reeves, who from 1941 to 1946 served as the British consul residing in Macau. He assisted British citizens and others during World War II, when Hong Kong, then a British territory, was invaded by Japan. At the time Macau was controlled by Portugal, which had not chosen a side in the war; Macau was not invaded by any party. Colin Day and Richard Garrett edited the published work, and the volume also includes an essay written by David Calthorpe about Reeves. It is a part of the Royal Asiatic Society Hong Kong Studies Series.

== Background ==
Reeves wrote his memoirs in 1946, starting his efforts while engaging in his "home leave", and continuing whilst serving for the Foreign Office in Rome, Italy. The writing ended in 1949. Editor Day wrote that "It is quite apparent that he hoped for publication" and therefore Reeves wrote deliberately in a manner of "occasional vagueness". However the Foreign Office asked him not to publish the book to avoid complicating relations between the United Kingdom and Portugal, the Republic of China, and the United States in addition to standard Foreign Office rules against such matters.

Day wrote that "It is believed that the main body of the memoir was hand-written and then typed by a secretary, probably in Rome." Calthorpe's partner created a Microsoft Word file using the text of the typed document. Wilhelm Snyman gave copies of the Word file to the editors of the published volume and also introduced the file to Macau itself. The editors added the texts of various addenda into the body of the original document as the addenda stated where they were to be inserted.

Day did consulting work for the Cultural Affairs Bureau of Macau and is the publisher of HKUP; he had previous work experience in the United Kingdom and the United States. Day first read the memoirs circa 2000 after meeting a South African academic who had copies of the documents.

== Contents ==
Bill Purves stated in a review published in the Asian Review of Books that "Reeves’s account is less than half of the story" due to the desire of Reeves to be published. Purves stated that therefore "Reeves’s presumably much more interesting anti-Japanese activities are alluded to only occasionally, and very, very indirectly."

== Reception ==
Augustine Meaher, whose review was published by the University of Southern California USC US-China Institute, wrote that the book was an "excellent work for" historians and university students of all levels.

Purves wrote "So don’t purchase this memoir for tales of hugger-mugger, but The Lone Flag nevertheless gives an interesting picture of wartime life in a theatre which has previously received almost no attention."
