= Zheng Xincong =

Chinese politician (born 1963)

- 郑新聪
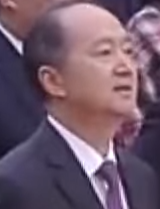
- Zheng in 2023

Director of the Macau Liaison Office
- Incumbent
- Assumed office 30 May 2022
- Preceded by: Fu Ziying

Personal details
- Born: November 1963 (age 62) Xianyou County, Fujian, China
- Party: Chinese Communist Party
- Education: Party School of Fujian Provincial Committee of the Chinese Communist Party

Chinese name
- Simplified Chinese: 郑新聪
- Traditional Chinese: 鄭新聰
Transcriptions
Standard Mandarin
- Hanyu Pinyin: Zhèng Xīncōng

Zheng Xincong (Chinese: 郑新聪; born November 1963) is a Chinese politician, currently serving as director of the Macau Liaison Office.

He was a delegate to the 12th National People's Congress. He was a representative of the 19th National Congress of the Chinese Communist Party. He is a representative of the 20th National Congress of the Chinese Communist Party and a member of the 20th Central Committee of the Chinese Communist Party.

== Early life and education ==
Zheng was born in Xianyou County, Fujian, in November 1963, and graduated from the Party School of Fujian Provincial Committee of the Chinese Communist Party.

== Political career ==
Zheng joined the Chinese Communist Party (CCP) in December 1986.

Zheng worked in Sanming Cement Plant (now Sanming Building Materials Corporation) for a long time, and eventually becoming party secretary in December 1996.

Since 1998, Zheng successively served as deputy party secretary and deputy magistrate of Datian County (1998–2001), director of Sanming Municipal Economic and Trade Commission (2001–2003), secretary-general of Sanming Municipal People's Government (2003–2006), deputy director of Fujian Provincial Economic and Trade Commission (2006–2008), general manager and party secretary of Fujian Shipbuilding Industry Group (2007–2008), and deputy secretary-general of Fujian Provincial People's Government (2008–2010).

In July 2010, Zheng became vice mayor of Quanzhou, rising to mayor in February 2013. He also served as mayor of Ningde from December 2011 to February 2013. He was party secretary of Quanzhou in June 2015, in addition to serving as chairman of Quanzhou Municipal People's Congress. He was elevated to vice governor of Fujian in January 2018. He was appointed secretary-general of the CCP Fujian Provincial Committee in May 2019 and was admitted to member of the Standing Committee of the CCP Fujian Provincial Committee, the province's top authority. In April 2021, he succeeded Zhao Long as executive vice governor of Fujian, but having held the position for only three months.

In July 2021, Zheng was chosen as deputy director of the Macau Liaison Office, and rose to director in May 2022. He is also the adviser on National Security Affairs to the Committee for the Maintenance of National Security of the Macau Special Administrative Region.

Government offices
Preceded by Liao Xiaojun	Mayor of Ningde; 2012–2013	Succeeded by Sui Jun
Preceded by Huang Shaoping	Mayor of Quanzhou; 2013–2015	Succeeded by Kang Tao
Preceded by Zhao Long	Executive Vice Governor of Fujian; 2021	Succeeded by Guo Ningning
Preceded by Fu Ziying	Director of the Macau Liaison Office; 2022–	Incumbent
Party political offices
Preceded by Huang Shaoping	Communist Party Secretary of Quanzhou; 2015–2018	Succeeded by Kang Tao
Preceded by Liang Jianyong	Secretary-General of Fujian Provincial Committee of the Chinese Communist Party; 2019–2021	Succeeded by Cui Yonghui
