= Wan Guoquan =

Chinese politician

Wan Guoquan (Chinese: 万国权; March 26, 1919 – March 23, 2017) was a Chinese male politician, who served as the vice chairperson of the Chinese People's Political Consultative Conference.
