= Yu Xiaosong =

Chinese politician (born 1937)

Yu Xiaosong (Chinese: 俞晓松; born 1937) was a former member of the 9th National CPPCC Committee. Promoted to director of Ministry of Foreign Trade, Foreign Investment Department in 1987. Awarded the "Premier Trade Award" by the Japanese Prime Minister in 1998 for his work improving economic & trade ties with the Japan. Deputy Secretary of the Beijing Municipal Government during Tiananmen Square protests.

Yu graduated from Tsinghua University.

== Honors ==
- Japan:
  - Order of the Rising Sun, 2nd Class, Gold and Silver Star (17 July 2006).
