= Office of the Commissioner of the Ministry of Foreign Affairs (Macau) =

Government office in Macau, China

Office of the Commissioner of the Ministry of Foreign Affairs of the People's Republic of China in the Macao Special Administrative Region
- 中華人民共和國外交部 駐澳門特別行政區特派員公署; Comissáriado do Ministério dos Negócios Estrangeiros da República Popular da China na Região Administrativa Especial de Macau
- National emblem of China

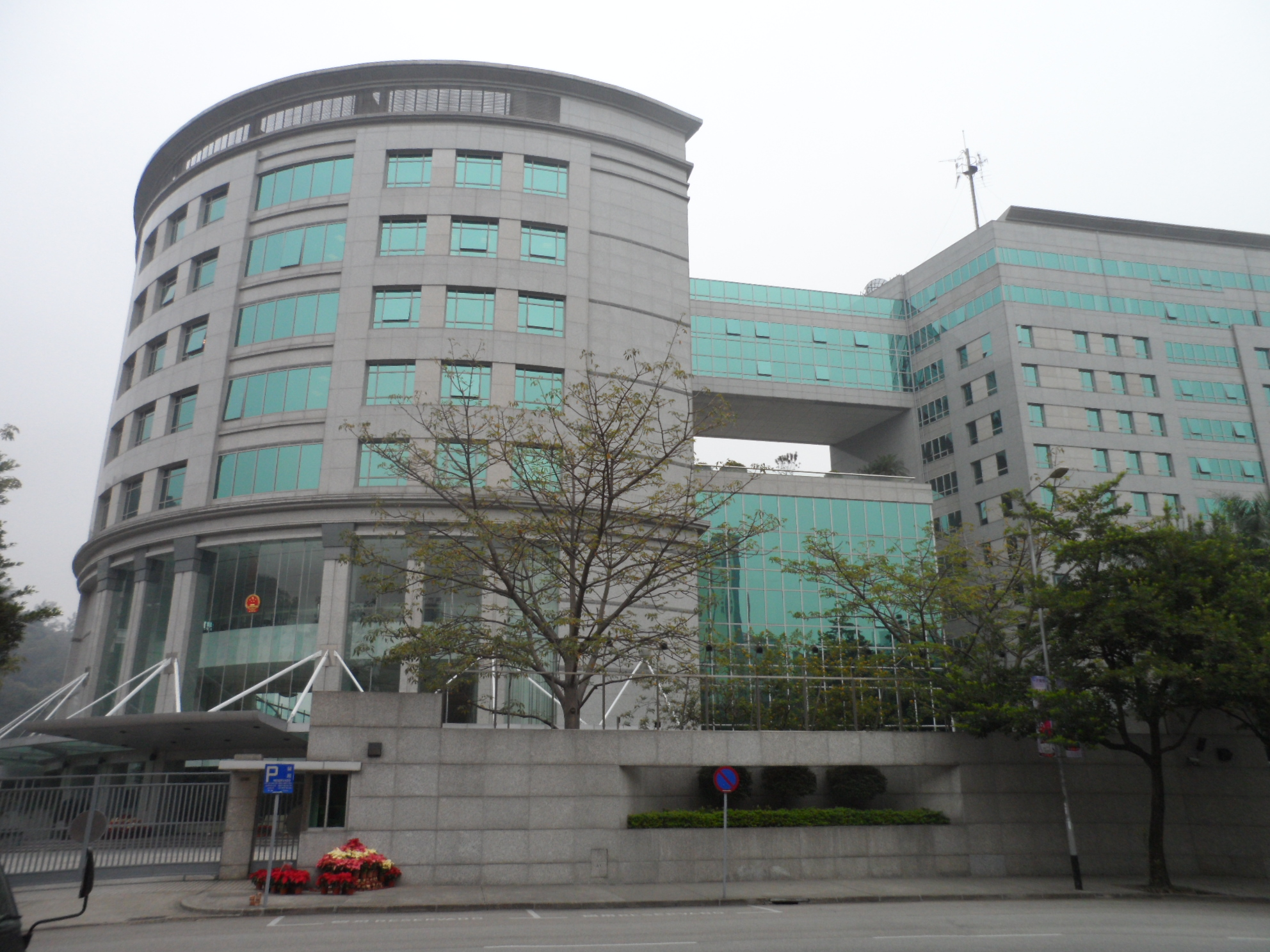
- Office Building in 2013

Agency overview
- Formed: December 20, 1999
- Jurisdiction: Government of China
- Headquarters: Sé, Macau, China; 22°11′45.0″N 113°33′10.3″E
- Minister responsible: Liu Xianfa, Commissioner
- Parent department: Ministry of Foreign Affairs
- Website: mo.ocmfa.gov.cn

The Office of the Commissioner of the Ministry of Foreign Affairs of the People's Republic of China in the Macao Special Administrative Region is a governmental office established by the Ministry of Foreign Affairs of China in Macau in accordance with the Basic Law to handle foreign affairs related to Macau. The main responsibilities of the Commissioner's Office are to coordinate Macau's participation in international organizations and conferences, to deal with the application issues of international conventions in Macau, and to coordinate the establishment of consular offices by foreign governments in Macau.

Office of the Commissioner of the Ministry of Foreign Affairs

Chinese name
- Traditional Chinese: 中華人民共和國外交部駐澳門特別行政區特派員公署
- Simplified Chinese: 中华人民共和国外交部驻澳门特别行政区特派员公署
Transcriptions
Standard Mandarin
- Hanyu Pinyin: Zhōnghuá Rénmín Gònghéguó Wàijiāobù zhù Àomén Tèbiéxíngzhèngqū Tèpàiyuán Gōngshǔ
Yue: Cantonese
- Jyutping: zung1 waa4 jan4 man4 gung6 wo4 gwok3 ngoi6 gaau1 bou6 zyu3 ou3 mun4*2 dak6 bit6 hang4 zing3 keoi1 dak6 paai3 jyun4 gung1 cyu5

Portuguese name
- Portuguese: Comissáriado do Ministério dos Negócios Estrangeiros da República Popular da China na Região Administrativa Especial de Macau

== Organizational structure ==
- Department of Policy Research
- Department of International Organizations and Legal Affairs
- Department of Consular Affairs
- Department of Public Diplomacy and Information
- Department of General Affairs

== See also ==
- Ministry of Foreign Affairs of the People's Republic of China
  - Office of the Commissioner of the Ministry of Foreign Affairs of the People's Republic of China in the Hong Kong Special Administrative Region
- Liaison Office of the Central People's Government in the Macao Special Administrative Region
- People's Liberation Army Macau Garrison
- Office of the Macau Special Administrative Region in Beijing
