= Foreign relations of Macau =

Under the Basic Law, Macau's diplomatic relations and defence are the responsibility of the central government of China. Except diplomatic relations and defence, nonetheless, Macau has retained considerable autonomy in all aspects, including economic and commercial relations, customs control.

As a separate customs territory, Macau plays an active role in international organizations and conferences such as World Trade Organization (WTO) and the Asia/Pacific Group on Money Laundering (APG), etc. in its own right under the name of Macau, China.

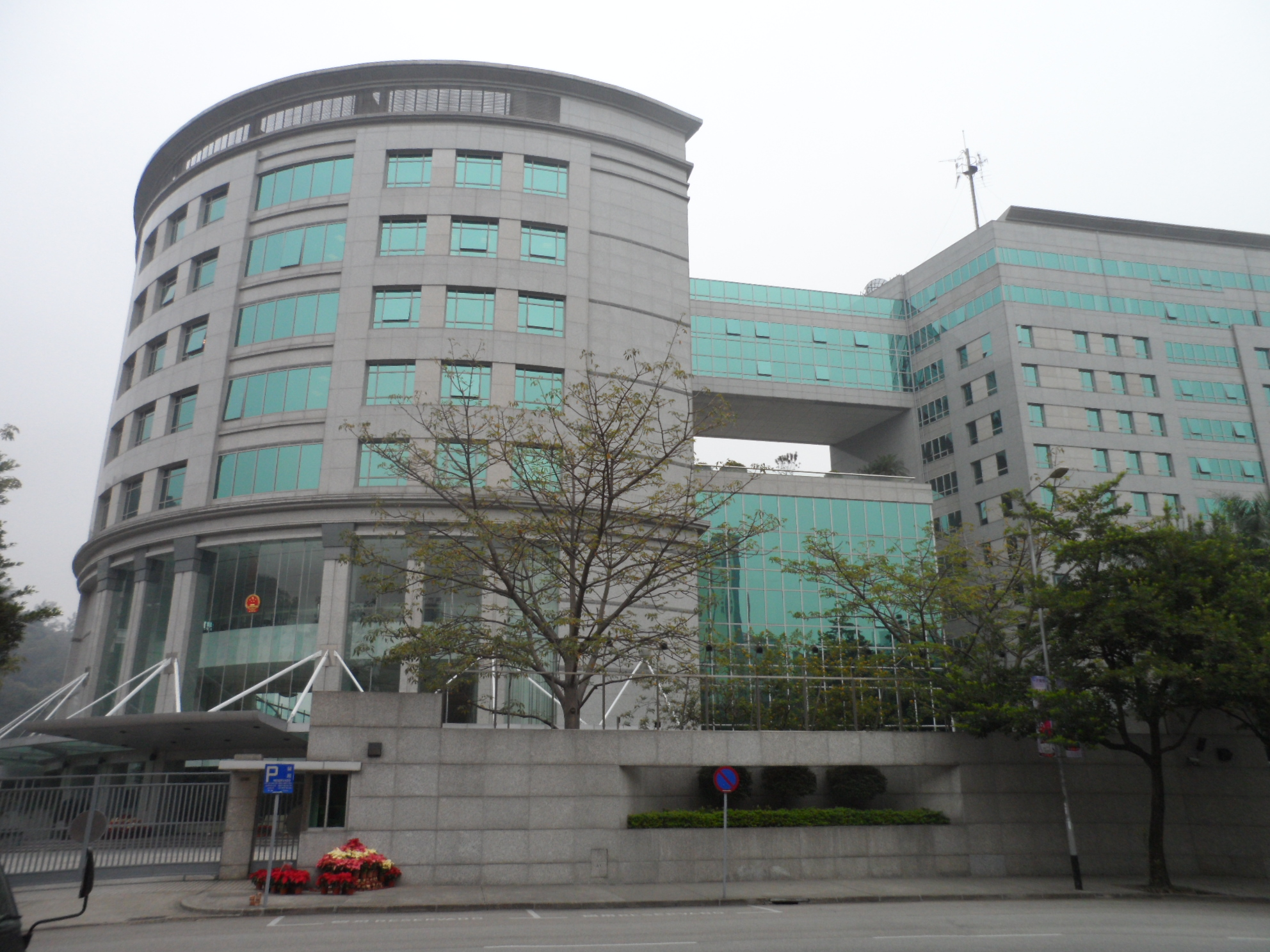
Office of the Commissioner of the Ministry of Foreign Affairs of the PRC in the Macao SAR

As of January 27, 2020, according to Directorate of Identification Services Official webpage, there are 144 countries or regions that implement visa-free policies for residents holding Macau passports.

== Macau office ==
The Macau government has maintained Macau Economic and Trade Representative Offices in Portugal, Belgium and Switzerland, and other countries.

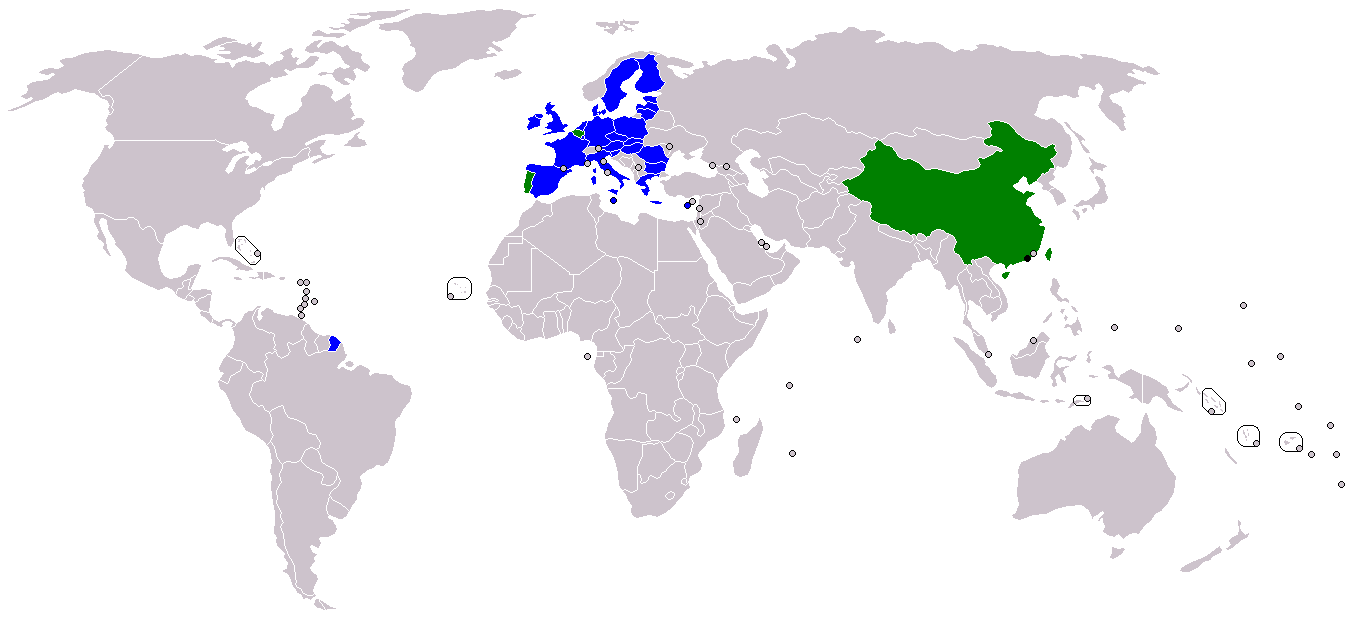
Office certified by the local government Countries hosting an office European Union, members not hosting an individual office

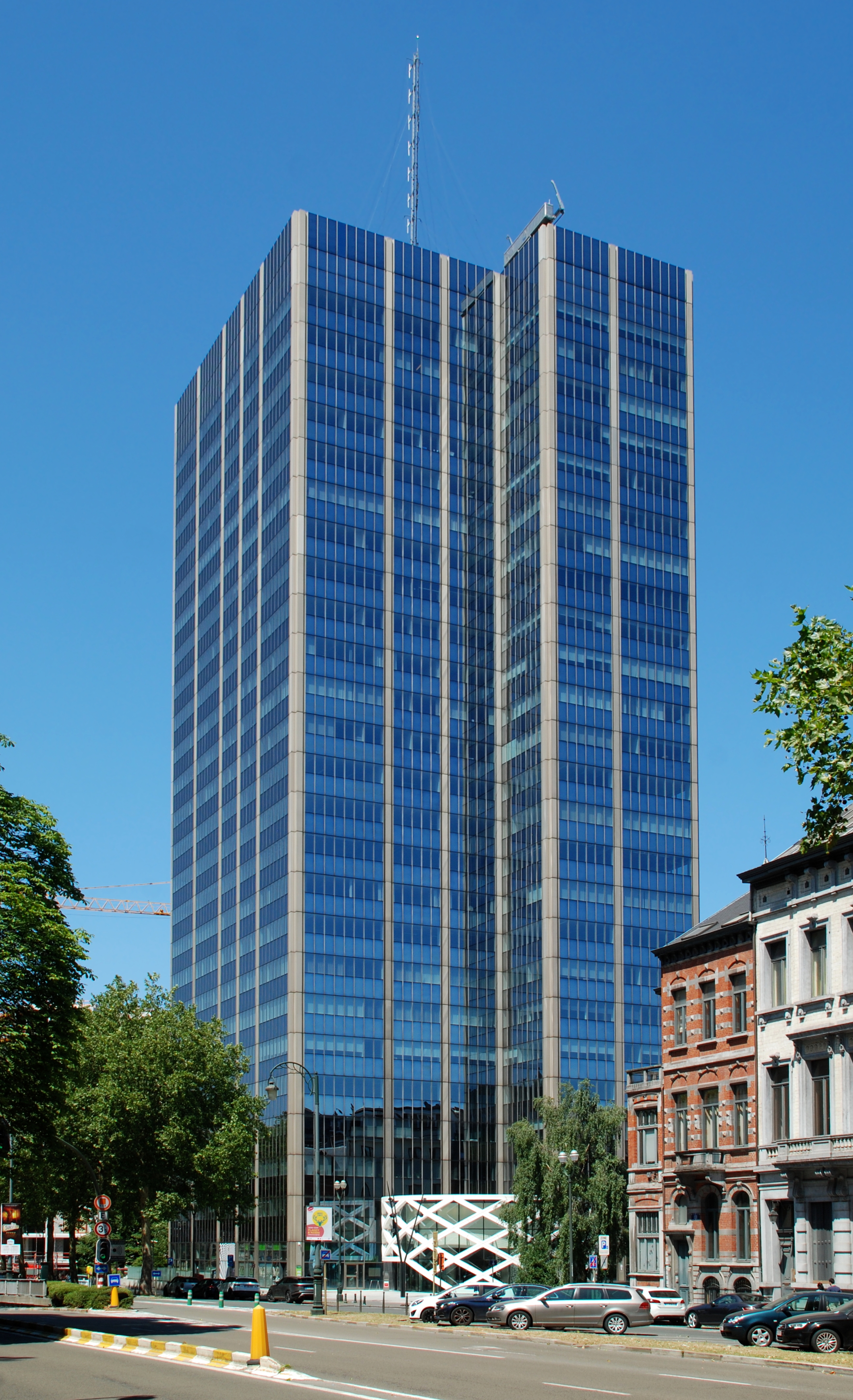
Macao Economic and trade office in Belgium

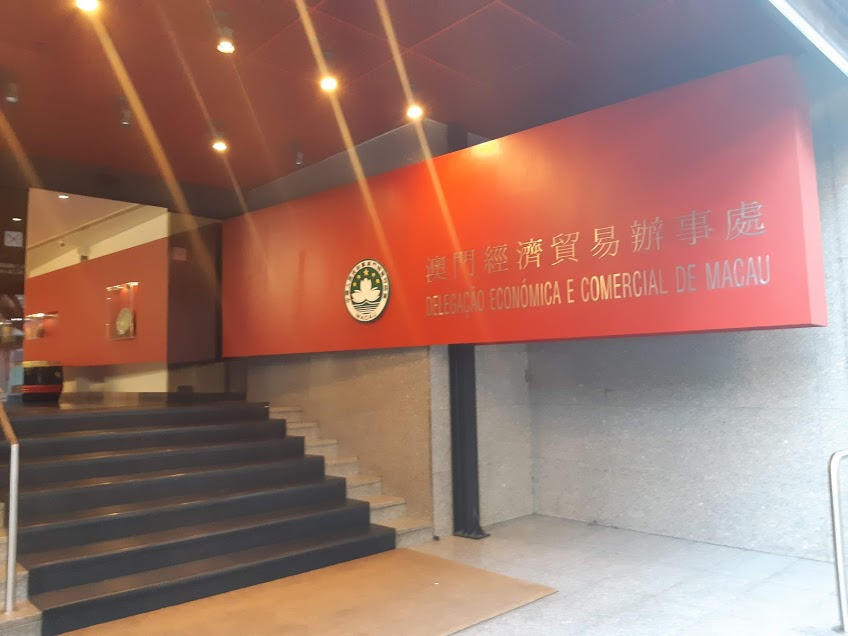
Macao Economic and Commercial Office in Portugal

- Macao Economic and Cultural Representative Office/Macao Government Tourism Office (Overseas)

country / region	location	Address/Official website link
China	Beijing	Dongcheng, China, 100006
Australia	Sydney	
New Zealand	Campbells Bay	7 Centennial Place, Campbells Bay, Auckland 0630, New Zealand
Belgium ( European Union)	Brussels	
United Kingdom	London	25 North Row, London W1K 6DJ, United Kingdom
United Kingdom	Oxford	1st Floor, Chester House, 21-27 George Street, Oxford OX1 2AU, United Kingdom
Switzerland	Genève	
South Korea	Seoul	
Thailand	Bangkok	
Malaysia	Kuala Lumpur	
India	Mumbai	9th Floor, Tower A, Urmi Estate, 95, Ganpatrao Kadam Marg, Lower Parel (W), Mumbai 400013, India
India	New Delhi	707, 7th Floor, Prakash Deep Building, 7 Tolstoy Marg, Connaught Place, New Delhi, 110001, India
Indonesia ( ASEAN)	Jakarta	
Russia	Moscow	
Hong Kong	Hong Kong	Flat 3, 7/F, Charm Centre, No. 700 Castle Peak Road, Cheung Sha Wan, Kowloon, Hong Kong
Taiwan	Taiwan	
United States	California	
United States	New York	
Portugal	Lisbon	

The Macao Economic and Trade Representative Office is a government department of Macao. It is responsible for promoting the work of representing the interests of all parties in Macao. It is a representative department and enjoys administrative autonomy. The office is responsible for assisting the Chief Executive in the work of economic and trade relations and cooperation between Macao and local and related institutions:

- Strive to make the relationship between Macau and the local area closer;
- Committed to showing Macau to the locals in the economic and trade field;
- Ensure to safeguard Macao's local interests and promote certain economic relations between Macao and the local area;
- Follow up the local decision-making process involving Macau's interests in all aspects;
- Collect, process and provide to the Chief Executive all information about community institutions that is meaningful to Macau;
- Follow up the management of trade agreements and conventions between the local and Macau;
- Follow up the development of cooperation between Macao and the local area in accordance with the provisions of the existing agreements, and participate in the formulation and preparation of projects related to these agreements;
- In accordance with the general guidelines set by the Chief Executive for him, to ensure that the local area and its institutions safeguard other interests of Macao, including the interests of tourism.

In countries or territories where no MOETO is present, diplomatic missions of China have the duty to represent Macau's interests. Visa applications at these missions are, nevertheless, sent to and processed by the Immigration Department of Macau.

== International agreements ==
According to the Basic Law, Macao may individually sign bilateral agreements with relevant countries and regions in appropriate fields such as economy, trade, finance, shipping, communications, tourism, culture, science and technology, and sports, in the name of "Macao, China".

- Negotiation

By the end of 2018, Macau has negotiated civil aviation agreements with 46 countries and regions including the Czech Republic and the United Kingdom. Macau negotiates judicial assistance agreements with 11 countries and regions including Portugal and East Timor. Macau negotiates investment protection agreements with three countries and regions including Portugal and the Netherlands. Macau negotiates tax information exchange or double taxation agreements with 42 countries including the United Kingdom and Japan.

=== Bilateral Investment Treaty ===
- Portugal
- Netherlands
- China

=== Consumer Protection Agreement ===
- Brazil

=== Mutual Legal Assistance Agreement ===
- Portugal
- East Timor
- Mongolia
- Cape Verde
- Nigeria
- South Korea

=== Tax Information Exchange Agreement ===
- India
- Australia
- Denmark
- Faroe Islands
- Iceland
- Norway
- Finland
- Greenland
- Japan
- Sweden
- Jamaica
- Malta
- Argentina
- United Kingdom
- Ireland

=== Agreement on avoiding double taxation and preventing tax evasion ===
- Portugal
- Mozambique
- Vietnam

=== Civil Aviation Agreement ===
- Pakistan
- Czech Republic
- Cambodia
- France
- Sri Lanka
- Mongolia
- Maldives
- UK
- Iceland
- Japan
- Laos
- European Union
- Singapore
- Malaysia
- Vietnam
- Philippines
- South Korea
- Thailand

According to the Chief Executive's policy address, in order to protect the interests of investors in Macau. In the future, the SAR government will actively strive to sign taxation agreements with countries along the One Belt One Road and Portuguese-speaking countries.

== Trade Agreement ==
- European Union｜European Economic Community Agreement for trade and cooperation between the European Economic Community and Macao (June 1992)
- China (CEPA) (June 2003)
- Hong Kong (October 2017)

== International organizations ==
Flag of Macao, China

Note

- Macau participates in 19 intergovernmental international organizations with countries as participating units.
- Macau participates in 30 intergovernmental international organizations that do not use countries as their participating units.

- World Trade Organization
- Egmont Group of Financial Intelligence Units
- International Monetary Fund
- APEC Tourism Working Group
- United Nations Economic and Social Commission for Asia and the Pacific
- Asian Development Bank
- Asian Trade Promotion Forum
- EU-Macao Joint Committee
- International Hydrographic Organization
- International Maritime Organization (associate)
- International Association of Exhibitions and Events
- International Congress and Convention Association
- International Organization for Standardization (correspondent)
- Pacific Alliance (observer)
- The Global Association of the Exhibition Industry
- UNESCO (associate)
- Universal Postal Union
- WCO
- WAIPA
- WMO
- World Bank
- World Tourism Organization
- United Nations Economic and Social Commission for Asia and the Pacific (associate)
- International Criminal Police Organization
- Interpol (organization) (subbureau)
- World Intellectual Property Organization
- Boao Forum for Asia
- International Organization for Standardization

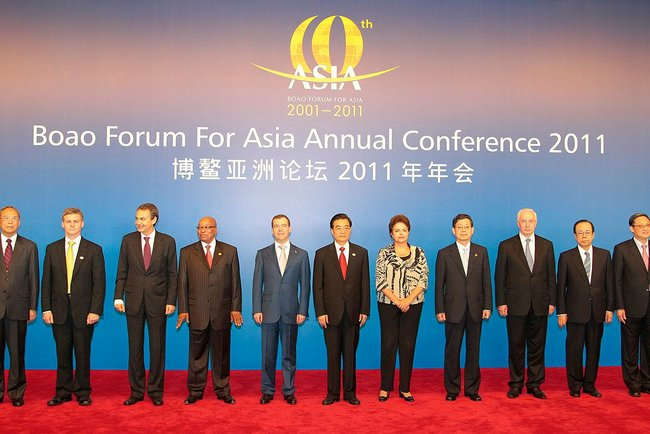
Chief Executive of Macau Fernando Chui participated in Boao Forum for Asia

Chief Executive of Macau participated Belt and Road Forum

Macao participates in the online meeting of the United Nations Commission on Narcotic Drugs in 2021

== Overseas visits made by senior officials ==
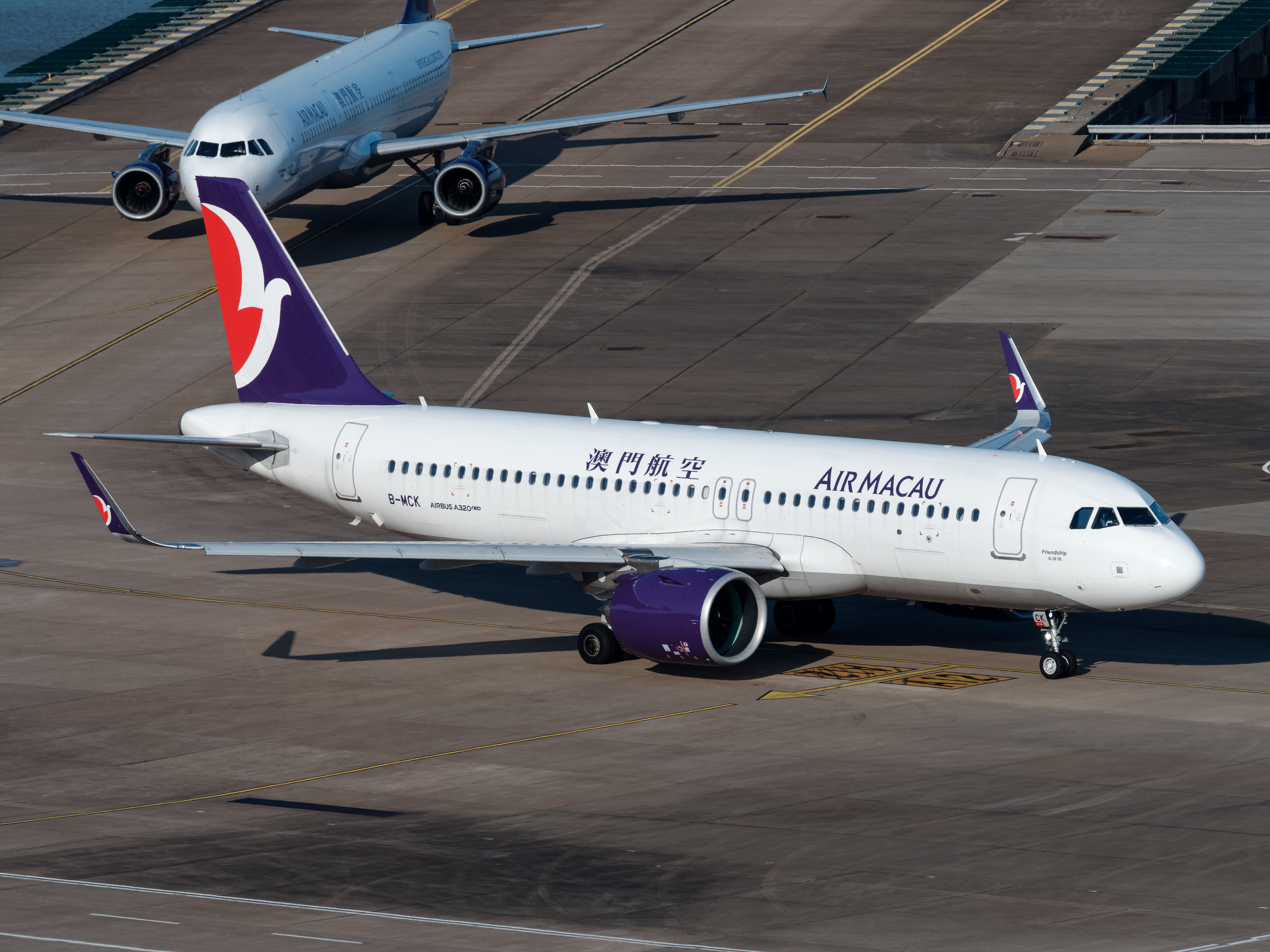
Air Macau's Airbus A320-200 passenger plane taxiing at Macau International Airport

The Chief Executive of Macao & other senior officials often make a duty visit to foreign countries. These visits usually aim to advance Macao's economic and trade relations with the foreign countries. During these visits, the Chief Executive will meet with political and business leaders. Usually, the head of state or head of government of the foreign countries will receive the Chief Executive. For example, during his tenure former Chief Executive Edmund Ho met with Prime Minister of Portugal José Sócrates, President of France Jacques Chirac, German Chancellor Gerhard Schröder, Prince Philip of Belgium, President of the European Commission José Manuel Durão Barroso, President of Brazil Luiz Inácio Lula da Silva, Prime Minister of Singapore Lee Hsien Loong, Prime Minister of Thailand Surayud Chulanont, Prime Minister of Malaysia Abdullah Ahmad Badawi, Vice President of Myanmar Myint Swe, etc.

== Foreign officials Visiting Macau ==
=== Protocol Division Government Secretariat ===
- Plan and prepare official activities for the Chief Executive's visits to Macau and abroad;
- Coordinating the reception activities of delegations at ministerial level or above at home and abroad and persons designated by the Chief Executive to visit Macau;
- Responsible for the management of non-foreign policy affairs of foreign consulates in Macao and officially recognized institutions, and related contacts;
- Assist in handling diplomatic representative certificates and consular officer certificates;
- Provide assistance in international cooperation and exchange activities between various departments of the government and international organizations;
- Coordinate the reception, meeting, banquet and signing ceremony of the Chief Executive in Macau;
- Coordinate large-scale activities of the government designated by the Chief Executive.

=== Foreign Officials ===
The heads of state and government of the Czech Republic, Mongolia, Estonia, Vietnam, Cambodia and dozens of ministers from more than a dozen countries, such as the Russian Minister of Education, respectively visited Macau. According to statistics, in 2011, the Macau government received a total of 40 times delegations from mainland China, more than 100 times consular and consular delegations, and 63 times foreign government delegations.

== Foreign Representation in Macau ==
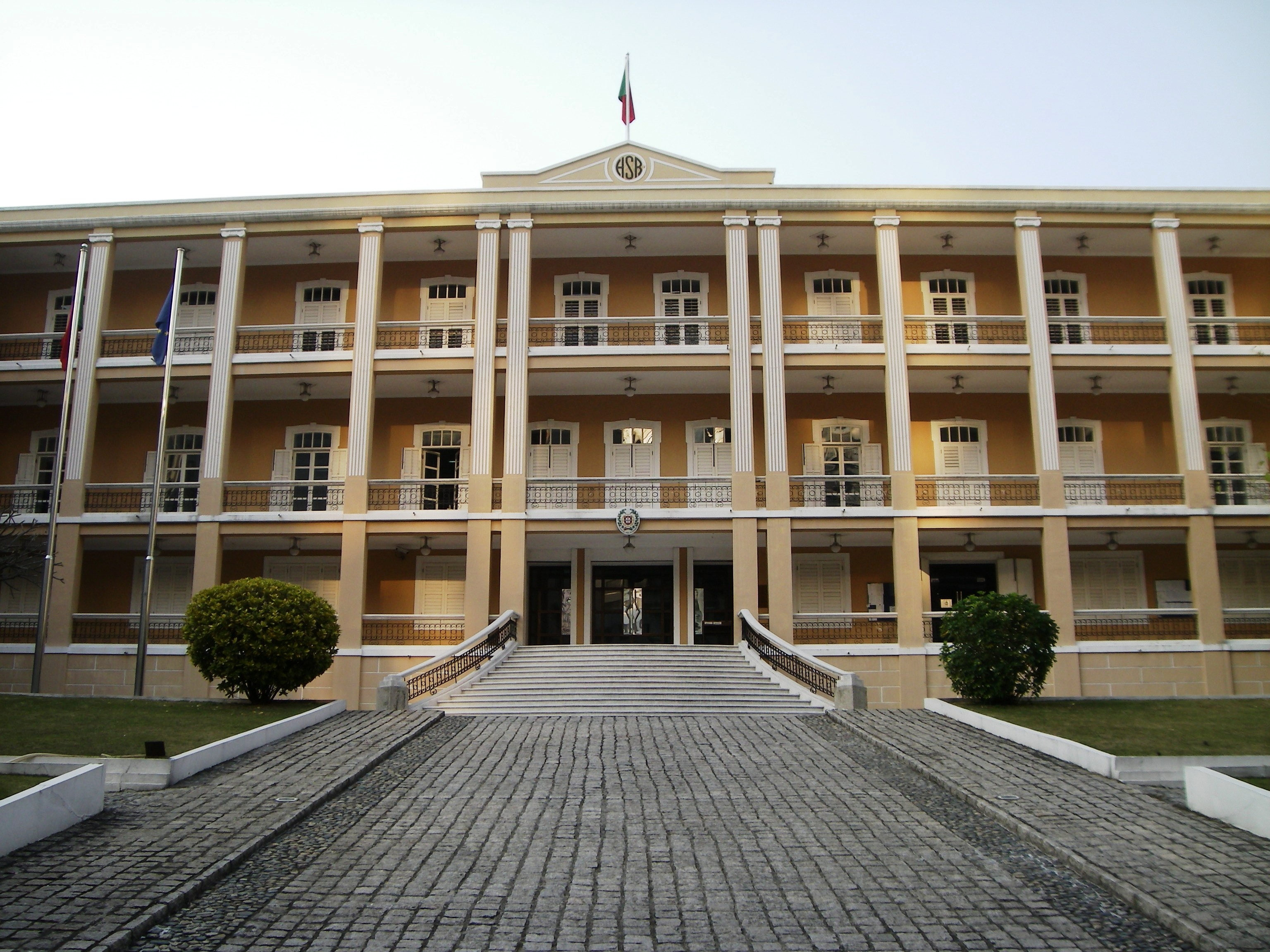
Consulate General in Macau

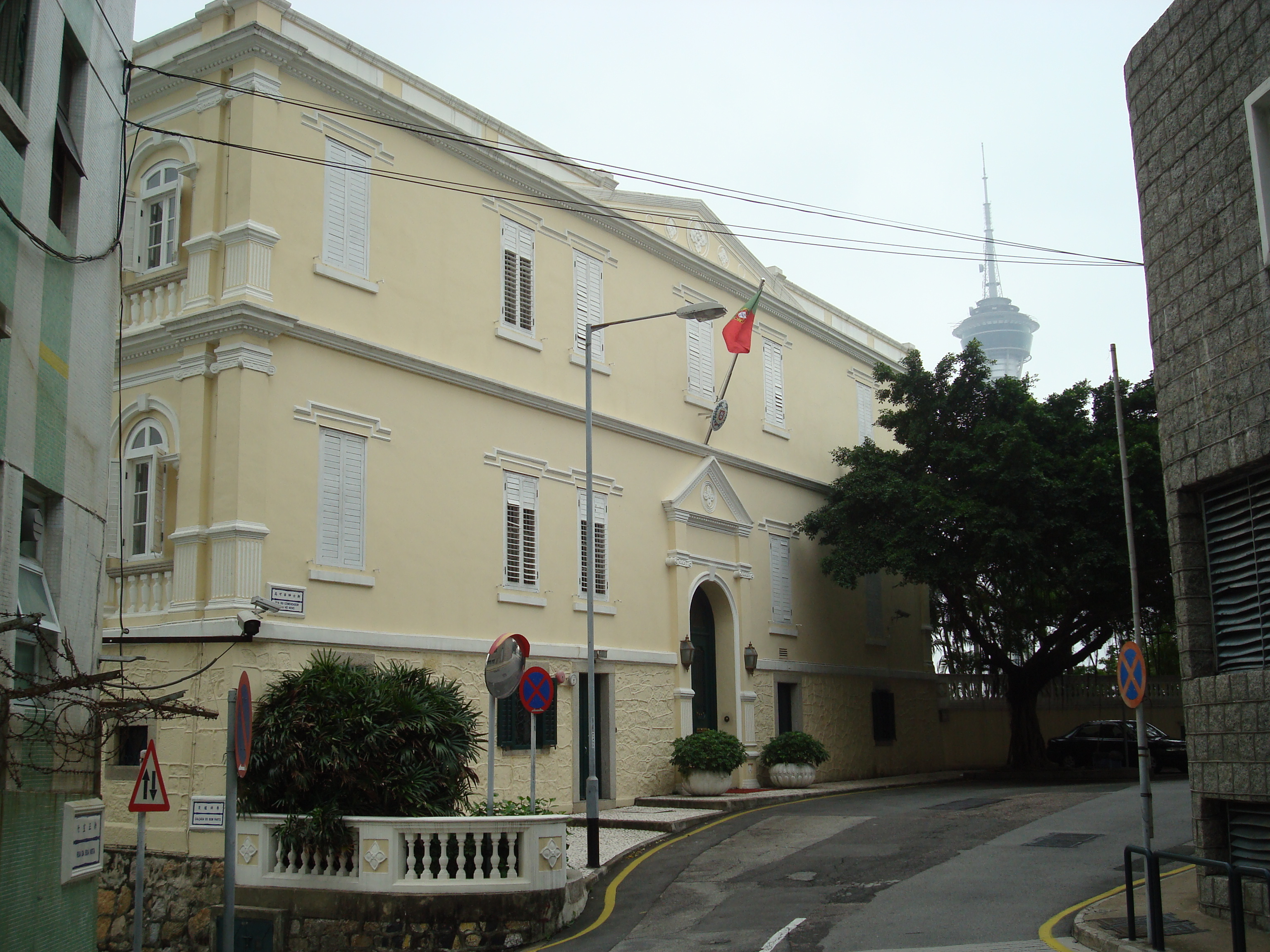
Portuguese Consulate General in Macau.

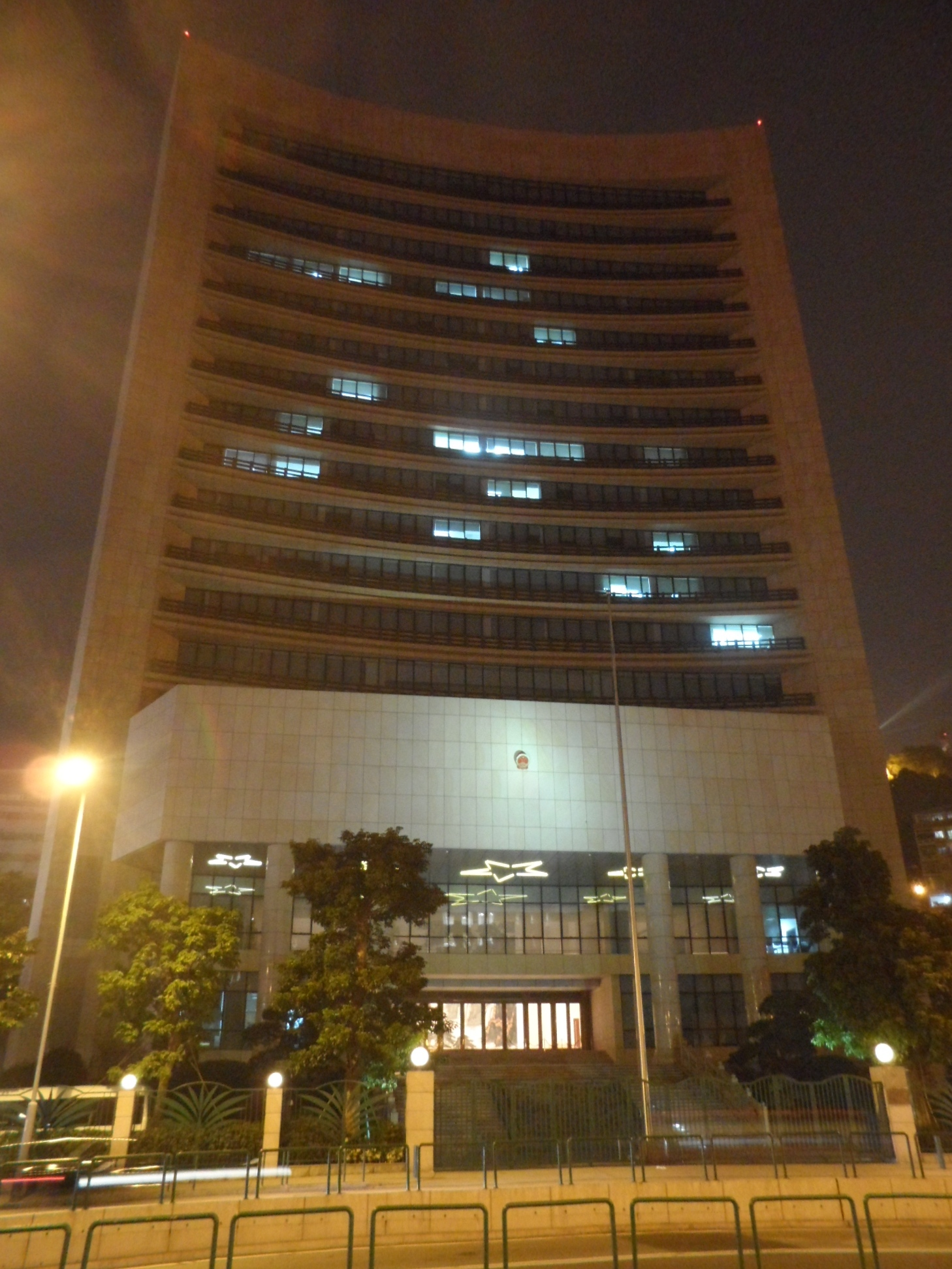
Liaison Office of the Central People's Government in the Macao.

=== History ===
From 1557 to 1999, the United States, Brazil, and other countries opened consulates in Macau, which were later closed. South Korea had a consulate general in Macau from July 28, 1984, to July 1, 2001, which was later closed and the South Korean consulate in Hong Kong was also responsible for Macao-related affairs.

=== Europe ===
- Portugal
- Estonia
- United Kingdom

=== Asia ===
- Philippines
- Vietnam
- Timor Leste
- Mainland China (Liaison Office)
- Taiwan (Taipei Office)

=== Africa ===
- Angola
- Mozambique
- Cape Verde
- Guinea
- Guinea-Bissau
- Mali
- Niger

=== Americas ===
- Grenada
- Peru

=== Multilateral organisations in Macau ===
- United Nations University
- Typhoon Committee

=== Chamber of Commerce ===
- European Union (Chamber of Commerce)
  - Germany (German Macau Business Association)
  - France (French Macau Chamber of Commerce)
  - Ireland (Chamber of Commerce)
  - Romania (Chamber of Commerce)
- ASEAN (Chamber of Commerce)
- Brazil (Macao Brazil São Paulo Business Association)
- Canada (Macau Canada Business Association)
- Japan (Japan Chamber of Commerce)
- South Korea (Korea Chamber of Commerce)
- Australia (Australian Chamber of Commerce Macau)
- United States (American Chamber of Commerce in Macau)

== Bilateral relations ==
=== Macau relations with Lusophone countries ===
Lusophone countries

Given the language, culture and intimate relationships, Macau has been communicating with the Portuguese-speaking countries through various channels for a long time. This can be reflected in the International Commercial Conference for Portuguese-speaking countries, which is held in Macau annually. Macau Trade and Investment Promotion Institute (IPIM) has a lot of co-operation protocols with the relevant organizations and commercial associations in Brazil and Mozambique. The organizations include the Portuguese Commercial Association in Macau, Portuguese Business Centre in Asia, Forum dos Empresarios de Lingua Portuguesa, Câmara de Comércio e Industria Luso-Chinesa, Portuguese Business Association and Portuguese Trade Commission.

In order to strengthen the economic co-operation and development between Chinese- and Portuguese-speaking countries and improve the international status of Macau SAR, the first "Economic Co-operation Forum between China and Portuguese-speaking Countries" was held by the Central Government of the People's Republic of China with the Macau SAR Government being the event coordinator. It is mainly for the economic co-operation and development of both sides and is non-political. The "Economic Co-operation Forum between Chinese and Portuguese-speaking Countries" will be held every three years and the first was in Macau in October 2003.

- Forum for Economic & Trade Cooperation between China and Lusophone Countries

Founded in 1999, the Macau SAR government was determined, with the great supports from the Central Government, to host the "Forum for Economic and Trade Cooperation between China and Portuguese-speaking Countries" in October 2003. Serving as a platform between China and Portuguese-speaking countries, Macau takes it as an important mission to enhance the friendship and cooperation between the two parties.

- Lusofonia Games 2006

The Association of the Portuguese Speaking Olympic Committees (ACOLOP) was established on 8 June 2004 in Lisbon with the aim to reinforce unity and cooperation of its members, which was already approved by the National Olympic Committees (NOCs).

Macau was honored and proud to host the 1st Lusofonia Games (7–15 October 2006) in the capacity as a founding member. The Lusofonia Games are a good opportunity to show the historical relations between Macau and Lusophone countries. They not only reinforce friendship between the other member countries, but strengthen Macau's developing sport tourism industry.

National Olympic Committee's (NOC's) Participants:

Angola

Brazil

Cape Verde

Guinea-Bissau

India (Associate member)

Macau

Mozambique

Portugal

East Timor

Sri Lanka (Associate member)

São Tomé and Príncipe

Equatorial Guinea (Associate member)

=== Macao ASEAN International Chamber of Commerce ===
The purpose of the Macau ASEAN International Chamber of Commerce is to safeguard the legitimate rights and interests of members in accordance with the laws, regulations and policies of Macau and with reference to international practices; Give full play to the role of Macau as an international platform, unite entrepreneurs from ASEAN, China, Hong Kong, and Macau, and promote extensive cooperation and exchanges between the two sides of the Taiwan Strait, Hong Kong, Macau and ASEAN countries in the fields of economy, culture, sports, education, economy, trade, science and technology. The Chamber of Commerce also cooperated with ten ASEAN countries, including Brunei, Cambodia, Indonesia, Laos, Malaysia, Myanmar, Philippines, Singapore, Thailand and Vietnam 's consulates in Hong Kong and Macau to set up ASEANexhibition areas with different themes.

=== Macau relations with EU ===
Macau-EU relations are based on a Trade and Co-operation Agreement concluded on 14 December 1992, which came into effect on 1 January 1993. This agreement covers trade and industrial, scientific and technical co-operation. A Joint Committee meets annually to oversee the operation of the Agreement and devises ways of developing trade and co-operation. The agreement remained in force as usual after 20 December 1999.

The commission's 1998 Communication "Building a Comprehensive Partnership with China" stated that EU policy was to support Macau's high degree of autonomy. This policy stems naturally from the EU's strong economic links and historical ties with Macau.

On 12 November 1999 the Commission adopted a Communication to the Council and the European Parliament, entitled "The EU and Macau: Beyond 2000". In this communication the EU considers that the respect for the principles set out in the basic law of Macau and the full implementation of the concept "one country, two systems" guarantee the specific social, economic and cultural identity of Macau. The Commission committed itself to monitor the situation in the territory by issuing annual reports.

The Macau SAR has an Economic and Trade Office (METO) accredited to the European Union, which ensures a regular dialogue between the EU and Macau on areas under the new SAR's responsibility, such as trade, economic relations and co-operation.

On 15 March 2001 the Council of the European Union adopted a new visa regulation and the EU granted visa-free access to Macau SAR passport-holders as from 10 April 2001.

An EC-Macau re-admission agreement was finalized and initialled on the occasion of the 9th EC-Macau Joint Committee in Brussels, Belgium on 18 October 2002. It was signed on 13 October 2003 in Luxembourg by Commissioner Chris Patten and the Italian Minister of Foreign Affairs Franco Frattini on behalf of the EC, and by Florinda Chan, Secretary for Administration and Justice, on behalf of Macau. The EU-Macau Cooperation in the Legal Field Project was inaugurated on 3 December 2002, featuring a series of seminars and training programmes to be executed for a period of 48 months for judges, procurators, government lawyers and other legal practitioners of the Macau SAR.

Given its status as a separate customs territory as stated in the basic law, Macau continues to be treated by the EU as a separate entity for trade policy purposes. The EU was Macau's third largest trading partner and absorbed about 23% of its total exports, while 12% of Macau's imports came from the EU in 2003 (Macau trade statistics). Total bilateral trade between the EU and Macau reached €1 billion in 2002. Macau's trade surplus with the EU was €382 million (Eurostat). The EU was the third biggest investor in Macau after Hong Kong and the People's Republic of China with 25 firms investing in the SAR in 2001. Total investment stock amounted to over €400 million. Macau's membership in the World Trade Organization and liberal economic system offer favourable conditions for EU investments.

=== Macau relations with the United States ===
In recognition of Macau's high degree of autonomy, the United States continues to treat Macau as a special area distinct from the People's Republic of China.

The U.S. government supports Macau's autonomy by strengthening bilateral ties through the promotion of bilateral trade and investment, law enforcement cooperation, academic and cultural links, and high-level dialogue and visits.

After the September 11 attacks, Macau officials pledged full cooperation with U.S. and global efforts against terrorism. Macau's legislature passed an anti-terrorism law in April 2002 that includes provisions that are consistent with the requirements of United Nations Security Council Resolution 1373.

Macau's clothes and textiles continued to enter the United States under quotas separate from those of China. Under the terms of a September 2000 bilateral Memorandum of Understanding, Macau and the US government cooperate in enforcing textile quotas and preventing illegal trans-shipment. The US continued periodic visits by U.S. Customs Textile Production Verification Teams to ensure compliance with Macau bilateral textile commitments.

The protection of intellectual property rights remains a priority issue on the U.S.-Macau bilateral economic agenda. Macau progress since 1999 in strengthening IPR laws, tightening controls over DVD and VCD manufacturing, and stepping up street-level IPR enforcement resulted in Macau being removed from USTR's Special 301 list in 2002. Macau's new customs service worked with U.S. industry associations and maintained high tempo operations to combat piracy.

U.S. investment in Macau, while small in the past, is expected to increase in coming years as the result of the 2002 awarding of two gaming concessions to consortia with U.S. interests. Though trade with Macau represents a small portion of U.S. trade, the United States was Macau's second largest trading partner after the People's Republic of China. U.S. exports to and imports from Macau in 2002 were US$79 million and US$1.2 billion, respectively. After the Macau government ended the 40-year-old gaming monopoly of the Sociedade de Turismo e Diversões de Macau (STDM) in February 2002, the government awarded concessions to three consortia, including two with significant U.S. investment. The restructuring of the gaming industry remains the centerpiece of Macau - efforts to improve its international reputation and become a Las Vegas-like gaming, convention, and family-oriented holiday destination. The possible new investment of US$1.5-2.5 billion in the medium term will increase jobs and income and dramatically raise the U.S. business profile in Macau.

== Specialized diplomacy ==
=== Medical Diplomacy ===
On June 12, 2020, the Chinese medical expert group assisting Sudan successfully completed its mission to aid Africa and returned to China by plane. They ended their 30-day work in Algeria and Sudan. Among them, the China International Emergency Medical Team (Macau) sent five members to join the Chinese government expert group to successfully complete the first foreign aid international emergency medical practice since the team was formed last year.

== Sister cities ==
- Concelho de Macau
  - Brussels, Belgium (friendship agreement)
  - Đà Nẵng, Vietnam (friendship agreement)
  - Lisbon, Portugal
  - Luanda, Angola (friendship agreement)
  - Porto, Portugal
  - Praia, Cape Verde
  - São Paulo, Brazil
  - Seoul, South Korea
  - Kolkata, India
- Concelho das Ilhas
  - Coimbra, Portugal
  - Linköping, Sweden

== See also ==
- Foreign relations of China
  - Foreign relations of Hong Kong
- Consular missions in Macau
- China–Portugal relations
- Visa policy of Macau
