= Macau Liaison Office =

Chinese government body

Coordinates: 22.194237°N 113.549642°E

Liaison Office of the Central People's Government in the Macao Special Administrative Region
- 中央人民政府駐澳門特別行政區聯絡辦公室; Gabinete de Ligação do Governo Central na Região Administrativa Especial de Macau
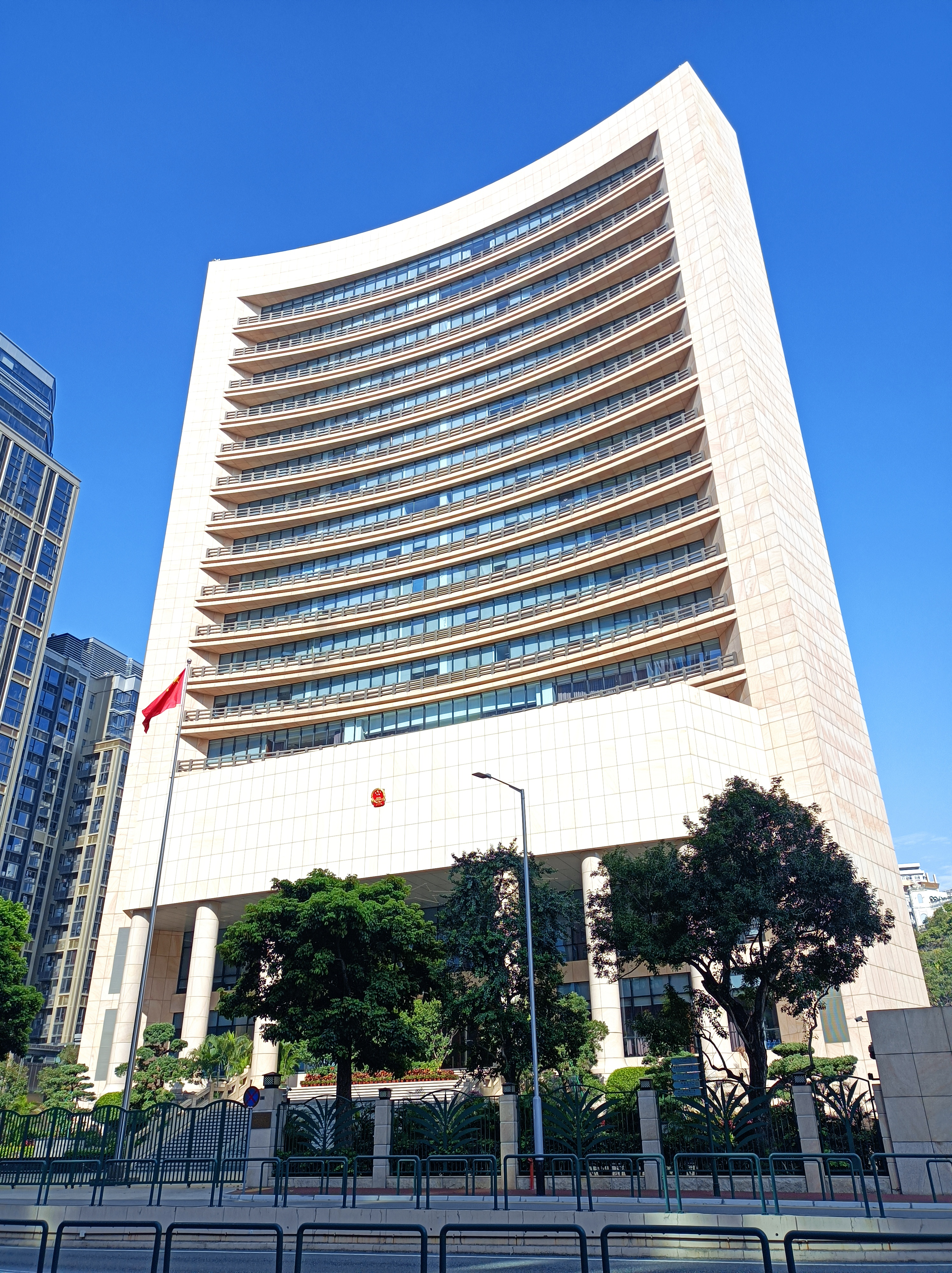

Agency overview
- Formed: 18 January 2000
- Preceding agency: Xinhua News Agency
- Jurisdiction: Macau
- Agency executive: Zheng Xincong, Director
- Website: zlb.gov.cn (in Chinese)

The Liaison Office of the Central People's Government in the Macao Special Administrative Region is the representative office of the State Council of the People's Republic of China in Macau.

Under the system "one institution with two names", the office also holds the name as the Macau Work Committee of the Central Committee of the Chinese Communist Party. Its counterpart body in mainland China is the Office of the Macau Special Administrative Region in Beijing. It is one of the three agencies of the Central People's Government in the Macao Special Administrative Region. The other two are the Office of the Commissioner of the Ministry of Foreign Affairs of the People's Republic of China in the Macao Special Administrative Region and the People's Liberation Army Macau Garrison.

== History ==
The office was established on January 18, 2000. This superseded the former branch of the Xinhua News Agency. The office is located in Xinhua Building; located in the southern foothills of the Guia Hill. The new building opened on January 16, 2010, at Freguesia da Sé.

When Macau was under Portuguese administration, the People's Republic of China was unofficially represented by the Nanguang trading company. This later became known as China Central Enterprise Nam Kwong (Group). Established in 1949, officially to promote trade ties between Macau and mainland China, it operated as the unofficial representative and "shadow government" of the People's Republic in relation to the Portuguese administration.

It also served to challenge the rival "Special Commissariat of the Ministry of Foreign Affairs of the Republic of China" in the territory, which represented the Kuomintang government on Taiwan. This was closed after the pro-Communist 12-3 incident in 1966, after which the Portuguese authorities agreed to ban all Kuomintang activities in Macau. Following the Carnation Revolution, Portugal redefined Macau as a "Chinese territory under Portuguese administration" in 1976. However, Lisbon did not establish diplomatic relations with Beijing until 1979.

In 1984, Nam Kwong was split into political and trading arms. On 21 September 1987, a Macau branch of Xinhua News Agency was established which, as in Hong Kong, became Beijing's unofficial representative, replacing Nam Kwong. On 18 January 2000, a month after the transfer of sovereignty over Macau, the Macau branch became the Liaison Office of the Central People's Government in the Macau Special Administrative Region.

== Headquarters building controversy ==
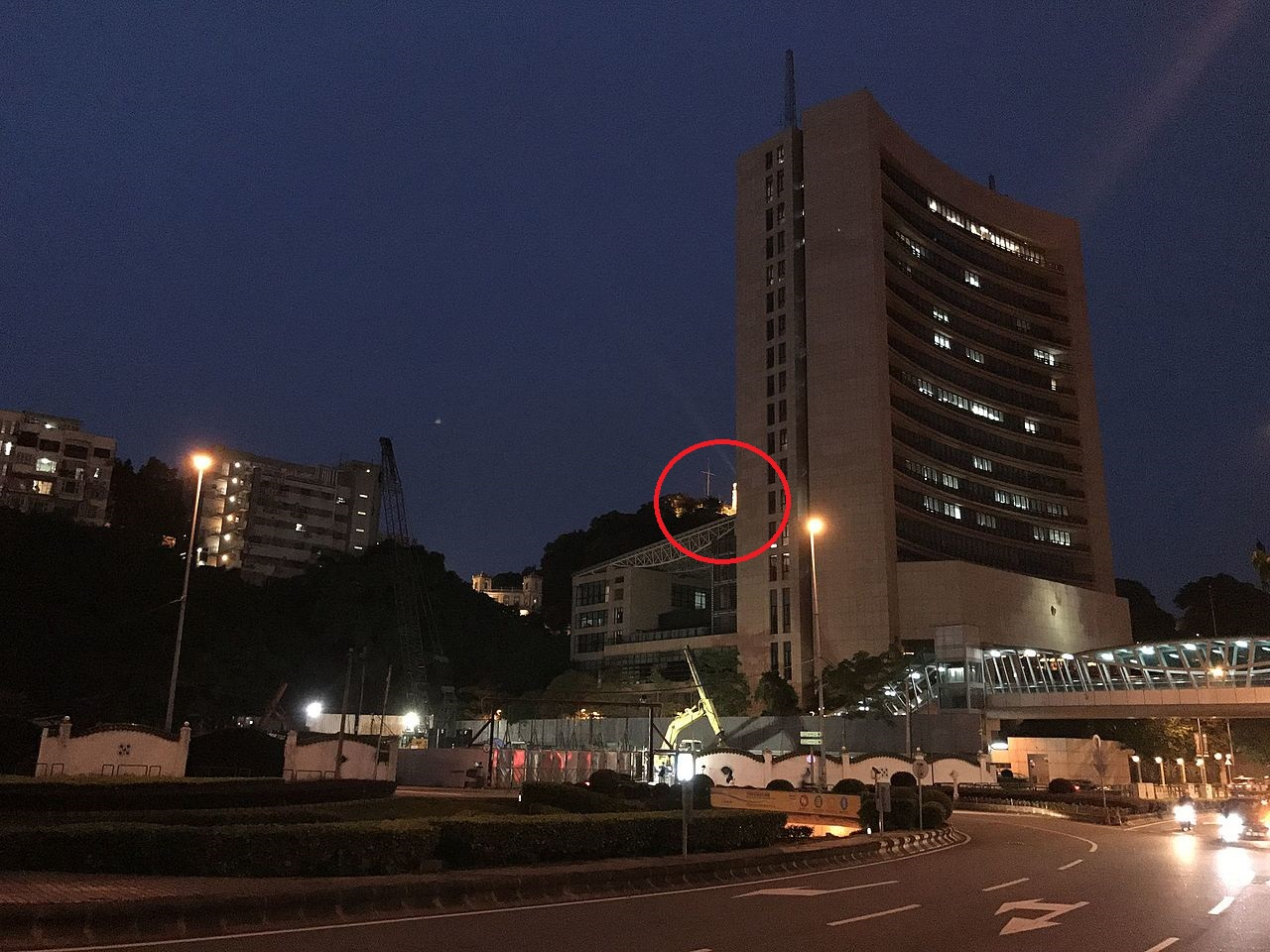
The view of Guia Fortress (center of the picture) is blocked by the headquarter.

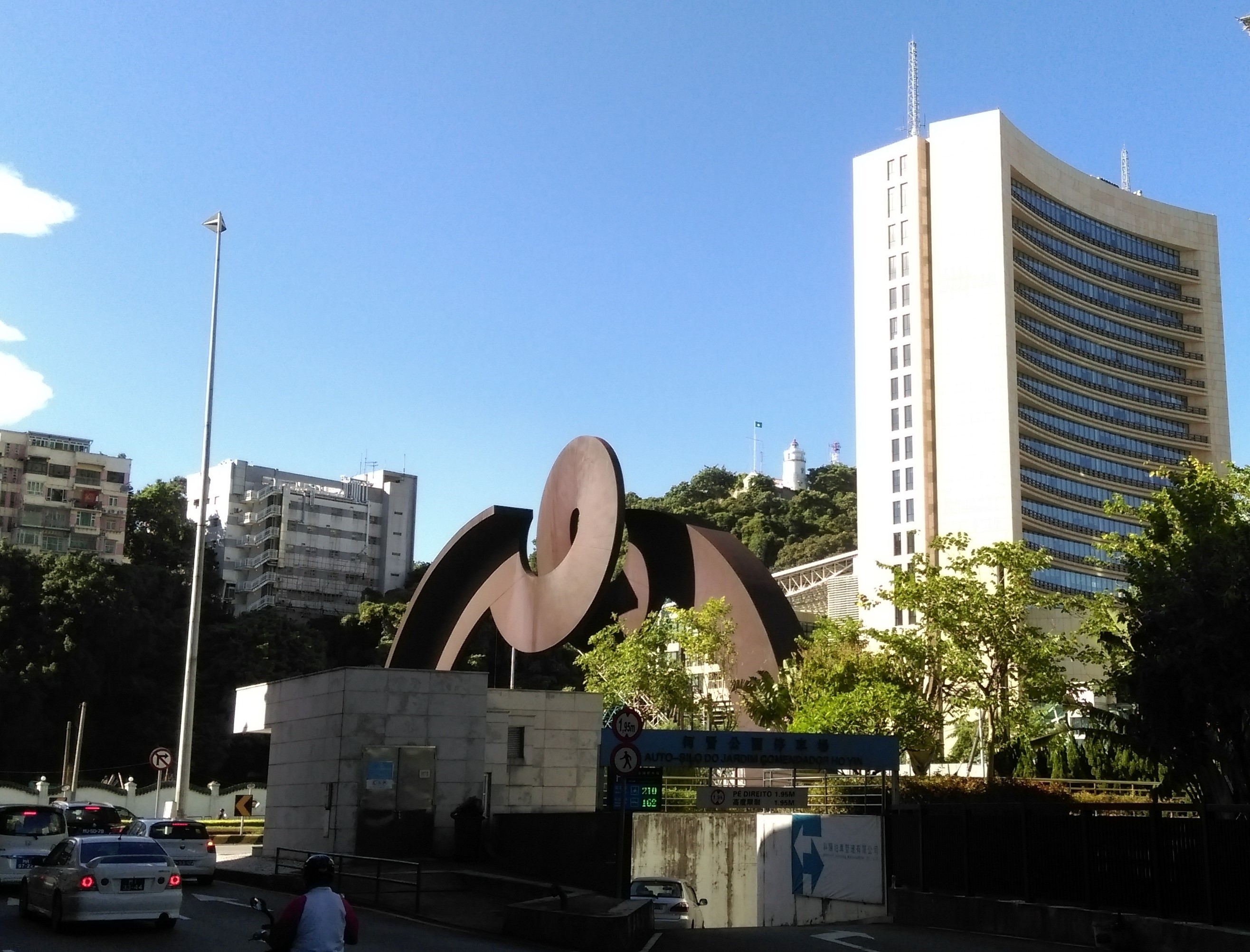
November 2017

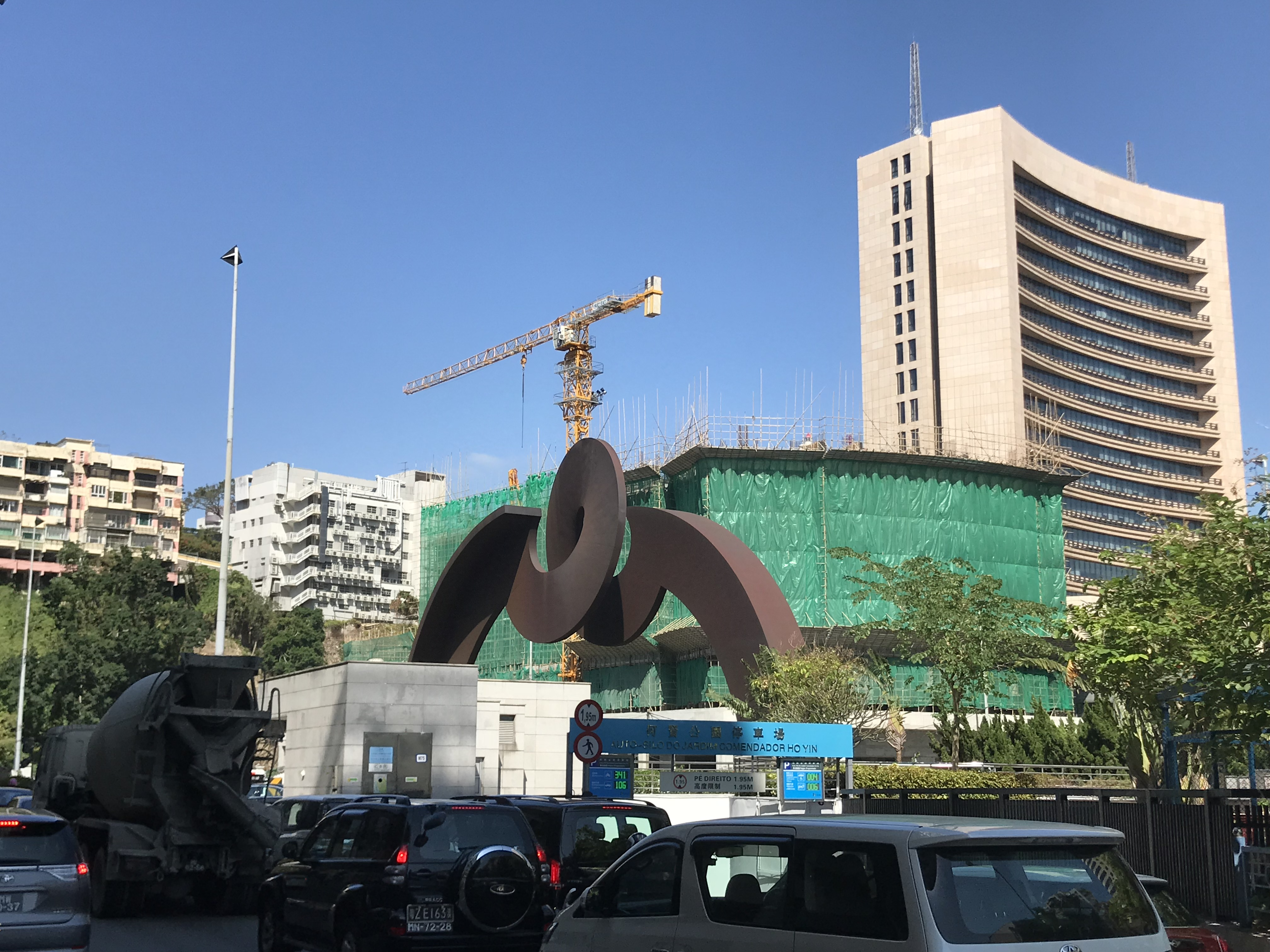
November 2018

In 2007, local residents of Macao wrote a letter to UNESCO complaining about construction projects around world heritage Guia Lighthouse (Focal height 108 meters), including the headquarter of the Liaison Office (91 meters). UNESCO then issued a warning to the Macau government, which led former Chief Executive Edmund Ho to sign a notice regulating height restrictions on buildings around the site.

In 2015, the New Macau Association submitted a report to UNESCO claiming that the government had failed to protect Macao's cultural heritage against threats by urban development projects. One of the main examples of the report is that the headquarter of the Liaison Office of the Central People's Government, which is located on the Guia foothill and obstructs the view of the Guia Fortress (one of the world heritages symbols of Macao). A year later, Roni Amelan, a spokesman from UNESCO Press service, said that UNESCO has asked China for relevant information but had yet to receive a reply.

In 2016, the Macau government approved an 81-meter construction limit for the residential project, which reportedly goes against the city's regulations on the height of buildings around world heritage site Guia Lighthouse.

Professor at Stanford University Dr. Ming K.Chan (Chinese: 陳明銶) and professor at University of Macau Dr. Eilo Yu (Chinese: 余永逸) commented the Guia Lighthouse case indicated that the Macao government had ignored the conservation of heritage in urban planning.

== Administration ==
- Zhou Ding
- Guo Dongpo
- Wang Qiren
- Bai Zhijian
- Li Gang
- Wang Zhimin
- Zheng Xiaosong
- Fu Ziying
- Zheng Xincong

== See also ==
- Office of the Macau Special Administrative Region in Beijing
- Liaison Office of the Central People's Government in the Hong Kong Special Administrative Region
- One Country, Two Systems
