= Xinhua News Agency Macao Branch =

Xinhua News Agency Macao Branch (Chinese: 新華通訊社澳門分社) also referred to as the Xinhua Macao Branch (新華社澳門分社) or Macao Branch (澳門分社), refers to the Xinhua News Agency branch in Macau that was established on September 21, 1987.

== History ==
Xinhua News Agency Macao Branch was formerly an informal office and mouthpiece, the main business for the political work for the Government of the People's Republic of China and the Chinese Communist Party in Macau, followed by the responsibility of being a news agency which was established in September 1987.

The original "Macao Branch of Xinhua News Agency" was reorganized on January 18, 2000. After the reorganization, the former Macao Branch of the Xinhua News Agency disappeared and replaced the newly registered Xinhua News Agency Macao Special Administrative Region Branch, and the nature of its news organization was restored as the decision made on December 23, 1999, according to the 24th executive meeting of the State Council of the People's Republic of China. For the Macao Working Committee of the Central Committee of the Chinese Communist Party (中共中央澳門工作委員會), commonly known as the "Great China", has been split up into the "Liaison Office of the Central People's Government in the Macao Special Administrative Region" (中央人民政府駐澳門特別行政區聯絡辦公室).

== President ==
1. Zhou Ding (周鼎)
2. Guo Dongpo (郭東坡)
3. Wang Qiren (王啟人)
