= List of generals of China =

This is a list of marshals and full generals and admirals of the People's Republic of China, including all branches of the People's Liberation Army and the People's Armed Police.

== Marshals (元帅) ==
Ten PLA officers were awarded the rank of Marshal (yuan shuai) in 1955. The rank was never awarded again.

- Zhu De
- Peng Dehuai
- Lin Biao
- Liu Bocheng
- He Long
- Chen Yi
- Luo Ronghuan
- Xu Xiangqian
- Nie Rongzhen
- Ye Jianying

== Army Generals (大将） ==
Ten PLA officers were awarded the rank of Army General/Fleet Admiral (da jiang) in 1955. The rank was never awarded again.

- Su Yu
- Xu Haidong
- Huang Kecheng
- Chen Geng
- Tan Zheng
- Xiao Jinguang
- Zhang Yunyi
- Luo Ruiqing
- Wang Shusheng
- Xu Guangda

== Generals (上将, 1955) ==
- Zhang Zongxun
- Song Renqiong
- Zhao Erlu
- Xiao Ke
- Wang Zhen
- Zhou Chunquan
- Xu Shiyou
- Liu Yalou
- Deng Hua
- Chen Zaidao
- Yang Dezhi
- Peng Shaohui
- Wang Hongkun
- Li Kenong
- Chen Bojun
- Li Da
- Yang Chengwu
- Li Tao
- Xiao Hua
- Gan Siqi
- Lai Chuanzhu
- Chen Qihan
- Song Shilun
- Su Zhenhua
- Chen Xilian
- Chen Shiju
- Wang Xinting
- Xie Fuzhi
- Ye Fei
- Huang Yongsheng
- Zhu Liangcai
- Yang Yong
- Zhang Aiping
- Fu Qiutao
- Han Xianchu
- Tang Liang
- Hong Xuezhi
- Li Zhimin
- Zhou Huan
- Li Tianyou
- Liu Zhen
- Yang Zhicheng
- Wang Ping
- Zhong Qiguang
- Guo Tianmin
- Wei Guoqing
- He Bingyan
- Lu Zhengcao
- Ulanhu
- Fu Zhong
- Zhou Shidi
- Tao Zhiyue
- Dong Qiwu
- Chen Mingren
- Yan Hongyan
- Wang Jian'an (1956)
- Li Jukui (1958)

== Generals (上将, 1988-Present) ==
Since the restoration of military ranks in 1988, the People's Liberation Army rank of shang jiang (上将: literally, "senior general") is translated as General.

=== Promoted in 1988 ===
On 14 September 1988, 17 officers were promoted to the rank:

- Hong Xuezhi (2nd time)
- Liu Huaqing
- Qin Jiwei
- Chi Haotian
- Yang Baibing
- Zhao Nanqi
- Xu Xin
- Guo Linxiang
- You Taizhong
- Wang Chenghan
- Zhang Zhen
- Li Desheng
- Liu Zhenhua
- Xiang Shouzhi
- Wan Haifeng
- Li Yaowen
- Wang Hai

=== Promoted in 1993 ===
On 7 June 1993, 6 officers were promoted to General:

- Zhang Wannian
- Yu Yongbo
- Fu Quanyou
- Zhu Dunfa
- Zhang Lianzhong
- Cao Shuangming

=== Promoted in 1994 ===
On 8 June 1994, 16 officers were promoted to General:

- Xu Huizi
- Li Jing
- Yang Dezhong
- Wang Ruilin
- Zhou Keyu
- Ding Henggao
- Dai Xuejiang
- Lin Boang
- Gu Shanqing
- Liu Jingsong
- Cao Fansheng
- Zhang Taiheng
- Song Qingwei
- Gu Hui
- Li Xilin
- Shi Yuxiao

=== Promoted in 1996 ===
On 23 January 1996, 4 officers were promoted to General:

- Zhou Ziyu
- Yu Zhenwu
- Ding Wenchang
- Sui Yongju

=== Promoted in 1998 ===
On 27 March 1998, 9 officers were promoted to General:

- Cao Gangchuan
- Yang Guoliang
- Zhang Gong
- Xing Shizhong
- Wang Maorun
- Fang Zuqi
- Tao Bojun
- Zhang Zhijian
- Yang Guoping

=== Promoted in 1999 ===
On 29 September 1999, two officers were promoted to General:

- Guo Boxiong
- Xu Caihou

=== Promoted in 2000 ===
On 21 June 2000, 16 officers were promoted to General:

- Huai Fulin
- Wu Quanxu
- Qian Shugen
- Xiong Guangkai
- Tang Tianbiao
- Yuan Shoufang
- Zhang Shutian
- Zhou Kunren
- Li Jinai
- Shi Yunsheng
- Yang Huaiqing
- Liu Shunyao
- Wang Zuxun
- Du Tiehuan
- Liao Xilong
- Xu Yongqing

=== Promoted in 2002 ===
On 2 June 2002, 7 officers were promoted to General:

- Qiao Qingchen
- Wen Zongren
- Qian Guoliang
- Jiang Futang
- Chen Bingde
- Liang Guanglie
- Liu Shutian

=== Promoted in 2004 ===
On 20 June 2004, 14 officers were promoted to General:

- Ge Zhenfeng
- Zhang Li
- You Xigui
- Zhang Wentai
- Hu Yanlin
- Zheng Shenxia
- Zhao Keming
- Zhu Qi
- Liu Dongdong
- Lei Mingqiu
- Liu Zhenwu
- Yang Deqing
- Wu Shuangzhan
- Sui Mingtai

On 25 September 2004, 2 officers were promoted to General:

- Zhang Dingfa
- Jing Zhiyuan

=== Promoted in 2006 ===
On 24 June 2006, 10 officers were promoted to General:

- Liu Yongzhi
- Sun Zhongtong
- Chi Wanchun
- Deng Changyou
- Peng Xiaofeng
- Pei Huailiang
- Fu Tinggui
- Yu Linxiang
- Zhu Wenquan
- Wang Jianmin

=== Promoted in 2007 ===
On 6 July 2007, 3 officers were promoted to General:

- Xu Qiliang
- Sun Dafa
- Wu Shengli

On 2 November 2007, 1 officer was promoted to General:

- Chang Wanquan

=== Promoted in 2008 ===
On 15 July 2008, 3 officers were promoted to General:

- Liu Zhenqi
- Huang Xianzhong
- Fan Changlong

=== Promoted in 2009 ===
On 20 July 2009, 3 officers were promoted to General:

- Ma Xiaotian
- Liu Yuan
- Zhang Haiyang

=== Promoted in 2010 ===
On 19 July 2010, 10 officers were promoted to General:

- Zhang Qinsheng
- Tong Shiping
- Liu Chengjun
- Wang Xibin
- Fang Fenghui
- Wang Guosheng
- Zhao Keshi
- Chen Guoling
- Zhang Yang
- Li Shiming

=== Promoted in 2011 ===
On 23 July 2011, 5 officers were promoted to General:

- Sun Jianguo
- Hou Shusen
- Jia Ting'an
- Liu Xiaojiang
- Zhang Youxia

=== Promoted in 2012 ===
On 30 July 2012, 6 officers were promoted to General:

- Du Jincai
- Liu Yazhou
- Du Hengyan
- Tian Xiusi
- Wang Jianping
- Xu Yaoyuan

On 23 November 2012, 1 officer was promoted to General:

- Wei Fenghe

=== Promoted in 2013 ===
On 31 July 2013, 6 officers were promoted to General:

- Wu Changde
- Wang Hongyao
- Sun Sijing
- Liu Fulian
- Cai Yingting
- Xu Fenlin

=== Promoted in 2014 ===
On 11 July 2014, 4 officers were promoted to General:

- Qi Jianguo
- Wang Jiaocheng
- Chu Yimin
- Wei Liang

=== Promoted in 2015 ===
On 31 July 2015, 10 officers were promoted to General:

- Wang Guanzhong
- Yin Fanglong
- Miao Hua
- Zhang Shibo
- Song Puxuan
- Liu Yuejun
- Zhao Zongqi
- Zheng Weiping
- Li Zuocheng
- Wang Ning

=== Promoted in 2016 ===
On 29 July 2016, 2 officers were promoted to General:

- Zhu Fuxi
- Yi Xiaoguang

=== Promoted in 2017 ===
On 28 July 2017, 5 officers were promoted to General:

- Han Weiguo
- Liu Lei
- Yu Zhongfu
- Wang Jiasheng
- Gao Jin

On 2 November 2017, one officer was promoted to General:

- Zhang Shengmin

=== Promoted in 2019 ===
On 31 July 2019, 10 officers were promoted to General:

- Li Shangfu
- Yuan Yubai
- Wu Shezhou
- Fan Xiaojun
- Zhu Shengling
- Shen Jinlong
- Qin Shengxiang
- Ding Laihang
- Zheng He
- An Zhaoqing

On 12 December 2019, 7 officers were promoted to General:

- He Weidong
- He Ping
- Wang Jianwu
- Li Qiaoming
- Zhou Yaning
- Li Fengbiao
- Yang Xuejun

=== Promoted in 2020 ===
On 29 July 2020, one officer was promoted to General:

- Xu Zhongbo

On 18 December 2020, 4 officers were promoted to General:

- Guo Puxiao
- Zhang Xudong
- Li Wei
- Wang Chunning

=== Promoted in 2021 ===
On 5 July 2021, 4 officers were promoted to General:

- Wang Xiubin
- Xu Qiling
- Liu Zhenli
- Ju Qiansheng

On 6 September 2021, 5 officers were promoted to General:

- Wang Haijiang
- Lin Xiangyang
- Dong Jun
- Chang Dingqiu
- Xu Xueqiang

=== Promoted in 2022 ===
On 21 January 2022, 7 officers were promoted to General:

- Liu Qingsong
- Wu Ya'nan
- Xu Deqing
- Qin Shutong
- Yuan Huazhi
- Li Yuchao
- Zhang Hongbing

On 8 September 2022, 1 officer was promoted to General:

- Wang Qiang

=== Promoted in 2023 ===
On 18 January 2023, 1 officer was promoted to General:

- Huang Ming

On 28 June 2023, 2 officers were promoted to General:

- Zheng Xuan
- Ling Huanxin

On 31 July 2023, 2 officers were promoted to General:

- Wang Houbin
- Xu Xisheng

On 25 December 2023, 2 officers were promoted to General:

- Wang Wenquan
- Hu Zhongming

=== Promoted in 2024 ===
On 28 March 2024, 2 officers were promoted to General:

- Wang Renhua
- Xiao Tianliang

On 9 July 2024, 1 officer was promoted to General:

- He Hongjun

On 23 December 2024, 1 officer was promoted to General:

- Chen Hui

=== Promoted in 2025 ===
On 22 December 2025, 2 officers were promoted to General:

- Yang Zhibin
- Han Shengyan

=== Promoted in 2026 ===
On 3 July 2026, 2 officers were promoted to General:

- Zhang Shuguang
- Wang Gang
