= Houji (disambiguation) =

Houji or Hou Ji is a mythological Chinese hero from the early Xia dynasty

Houji may also refer to these towns in China:

- Houji, Wuyang County, Henan
- Houji, Zhenping County, Henan
- Houji, Shandong, in Cao County, Shandong

== See also ==
- Hōji (disambiguation)
