= Gu Junshan =

Chinese general

- 谷俊山
- Born: October 1956 (age 69–70) (official sources); October 1954 (age 71–72) (alternate accounts); Puyang, Henan, China
- Spouse: Zhang Shuyan (Note: Her name has been written as Zhang Shuyan (张曙艳) by Caixin, but Zhang Suyan (张素燕) by other sources.)
- Military career
- Allegiance: China
- Branch: People's Liberation Army
- Service years: January 1971 – January 2014
- Rank: Lieutenant-general (stripped)
- Commands: Deputy Director of the PLA General Logistics Department (2009–2012)

Gu Junshan (Chinese: 谷俊山; pinyin: Gǔ Jùnshān; born October 1956 (Note: This birth date is disputed. According to an investigative report by Chinese-language magazine Caixin, Gu's close friends and military colleagues state his real birthday is October 1954. It is unclear why the discrepancy exists.)) is a former lieutenant general in the People's Liberation Army (PLA) of China who was sentenced to prison for corruption. He served as the deputy director of the PLA General Logistics Department (GLD) from December 2009 to February 2012. During his tenure he oversaw the consolidation and sale of military real estate assets. Prior to that, he served as the chief of the barracks and housing division of the GLD, in charge of upgrades to the facilities and residences of army personnel.

Born into a family of farmers, Gu joined the military when he was 17 years old. He worked in Northeast China, but was transferred back to his home province during the downsizing of the PLA in the 1980s. He then worked in logistics coordination for the Jinan Military Region, and was rapidly promoted thereafter. Gu attained the rank of major general (shao jiang) in July 2003 and lieutenant-general (zhong jiang) in July 2011. Gu was removed from office in 2012, as the authorities opened a far-reaching corruption investigation which resulted in the seizure of many Gu family assets. In 2015, Gu was tried and convicted on charges of bribery, embezzlement, illegally moving public funds, and abuse of power by a military court, and sentenced to death with a two-year reprieve.

== Biography ==
=== Early life ===
Gu was born and raised in the village of Dongbaicang (东白仓村), in the outskirts of the city of Puyang, Henan. He was the son of Gu Yansheng (谷彦生), a farmer born in 1924, and a woman from a neighbouring village. Gu Junshan was the eldest of six children. Gu studied at Dongbaicang Primary School (东白仓小学), then he attended Nanlixiang Middle School (南里乡中学). He was considered a "troublemaker" during his teenage years, and an unremarkable student.

In 1971, Gu joined the People's Liberation Army and was assigned to Shenyang Military Region, in China's northeast. He operated instruments for a local air force division as a cadet in Liuhe County, Jilin. Gu was considered a mediocre soldier in terms of technical ability and competence, but was adept at managing relationships with his officers. However, he received "poor" ratings several times in his performance evaluations, and was publicly reprimanded several times by his superior Zhang Longhai (张龙海). Gu was widely recognized in his division, however, for his adept ability to earn the trust and patronage of higher-ranked officers, sometimes through doing favours or giving gifts. Gu also became involved with Zhang Longhai's daughter, Zhang Shuyan. The elder Zhang was initially reluctant about the pairing, even going as far as transferring Gu into a different town to take up a job training new soldiers in order to avoid further liaisons with his daughter. However, eventually Gu and Zhang married anyway.

=== Career in Puyang and Jinan Military Region ===
In June 1985, the government announced a significant scaling down of the PLA, forcing soldiers to pursue other professions. Gu was transferred back to work in his hometown of Puyang, Henan province, and remained in the military with the help of his father-in-law, Zhang Longhai. His wife was given a job in Puyang's police department. In the next decade, Gu worked as a military liaison with the Zhongyuan oil field (中原油田) of Sinopec. Zhongyuan sponsored several programs in the local military, including a jointly operated rubber factory. By this point, Gu had earned the rank of major (shaoxiao), and soon rose to become one of the people in charge of the office running the joint military-business operations in the area. He mainly worked to manage relationships between the factory and various government and military stakeholders. Gu's detractors say that he used this period to profit off of selling commodities at inflated prices and then dividing the spoils to earn favours, though his immediate superior had a positive impression of Gu's work, saying that he was very competent and excelled at any task he was given.

By March 1993, Gu had become the Puyang military district's chief of logistics. In 1994, Gu was noticed by a visiting general from Jinan in neighbouring Shandong province, who spoke highly of his work and later transferred him to work in the production department of the Jinan Military Region. A few years later he was offered a leading post at the Jinan PLA Ground Force College (济南陆军指挥学院). He then went on to study at the PLA National Defence University, a breeding ground for China's top military brass.

=== General Logistics Department ===
In 2001, Gu was transferred to work in Beijing as a deputy chief of the barracks and housing division (基建营房部) of the PLA General Logistics Department, with full oversight on the army's housing upgrade program. He was promoted to the rank of Lieutenant General two years later. Between 2005 and 2007, the General Logistics Department spent some 500 million yuan in housing upgrade projects. Beginning in 2007, the PLA also undertook a massive barracks upgrade project.

A few years later, the military also began consolidating many of its real estate holdings. This consolidation resulted in the sale and rent of military properties in central areas of large cities, including Beijing and Shanghai. The Caixin investigation into Gu concluded that he took approximately 6% of proceeds from the sale of a piece of land in Shanghai worth some 2 billion yuan (~$326.8 million). It also alleged that Gu owned numerous massive condominium properties in the 2nd Ring Road area of Beijing, where real estate is known to fetch astronomical prices. Gu allegedly also struck deals with real estate companies, taking a 60% cut of profits from land sales.

== Corruption case ==
In December 2009, Gu became the deputy director of the People's Liberation Army General Logistics Department. This made Gu only one step away from becoming one of the directors of the PLA's "big national departments", and potentially achieving a full General (shangjiang) rank. Gu's meteoric rise was linked to Central Military Commission Vice Chairman and Politburo member Xu Caihou. Gu worked under Xu when Xu was the chief political commissar of the Jinan Military Region in the late 1990s. During Xu's daughter's wedding reception, Gu allegedly gave a cash card worth some 20 million yuan (~$3.2 million) to Xu's daughter.

Since Gu's ascension to the top ranks in Beijing, Gu's youngest brother Gu Xianjun (谷献军), otherwise known as "Gu San" (谷三; lit. "Gu number three"), built a large factory in Puyang to supply the military with office and residential furniture. It is believed that the success of the factory was due to the backing of Gu Junshan in the procurement of military contracts. In addition, Caixin reported that Gu San, who was the local village chief for nearly ten years, also built a real estate 'empire' in the area near the Gus old family home. Gu San and his associates were said to have achieved this through selling public land without consultation, buying land at below market value through real estate companies which were controlled by the Gu family, as well as taking kickbacks from local developers in exchange for aiding them in the bidding process for development projects. When villagers attempted to complain about the abusive practices, such as through public petitioning to the authorities, they were often met with resistance from officials with whom Gu maintained good relationships. In particular, Gu's wife Zhang Shuyan, a police official in charge of petitions, was also said to have prevented the fair hearing of the villagers' petitions.

Liu Yuan, the political commissar of the General Logistics Department, first proposed to take action against Gu in late 2011. Hu Jintao, Chairman of the Central Military Commission himself asked for Gu to be suspended, but was met with resistance by the top military brass. In 2012, bypassing military authorities, Hu asked the Chinese Communist Party (CCP)'s own internal control agency, the Central Commission for Discipline Inspection, to intervene in the case. It was said Gu would initially be charged with taking bribes of less than $1 million. Gu remained in his position as deputy director of logistics until February 2012, when his name was removed from the Ministry of National Defence and related military websites. Military disciplinary officials headed to Puyang for investigation at around the same time. Gu was formally removed from office in May 2012.

Upon Xi Jinping's accession to become General Secretary of the Chinese Communist Party, China's top leader at the 18th Party Congress in November 2012, Gu's case took a new turn. Xi, apparently incensed at the extent and wide reach of the scandal, ordered the investigation on Gu be widened. On January 12, 2013, investigators descended on Gu's hometown to raid his family compound. Investigators found large crates of luxury liquor, a gold model boat, and a gold Mao statue in storage. Investigators also found a large Forbidden City-style 'imperial compound' under construction; locals reported that Gu's family had hired artists from the imperial museum in Beijing to design the compound.

In March 2014, state media publicly announced Gu's corruption investigation. Gu was charged with corruption, bribery, embezzlement and abuse of power by the PLA Military Procuratorate. His case was then moved to court martial. Gu was the highest-ranked military official to be charged with corruption since the Wang Shouye scandal in 2006. Chinese-language media also reported that during the investigation, Gu gave evidence against Xu Caihou, alleging that Xu offered promotions in exchange for money. Soon after, Xu became subject to his own corruption probe, and on June 30, Xu was expelled from the CCP.

Gu was tried in secret in military court, as is customary for officers of his rank. It was reported in August 2015 that Gu was convicted on charges of embezzlement, taking bribes, giving bribes, moving public funds, and abuse of power. He was sentenced to death, with a two-year-reprieve, which is usually commuted to life imprisonment. He was also stripped of his lieutenant general rank.

== Family ==
Gu married Zhang Shuyan (张曙艳), whose name has also been written as Zhang Suyan (张素燕), the daughter of army political commissar Zhang Longhai (张龙海). Zhang Shuyan was an official in the Puyang police department, in charge of petitions. Gu was the eldest son of his parents; he has three sisters and two brothers. His siblings all own homes in the Puyang area of Henan province. The family also built a Forbidden City-style 'imperial palace' compound in Puyang, which fell into disrepair shortly after the Gu Junshan corruption case was opened.

Gu's youngest brother, Gu Xianjun (谷献军), also known as Gu San (谷三), was the local village chief for ten years before quitting in the summer of 2010. Gu San left town amid his brother's corruption investigation in February 2012.

Gu's father, Gu Yansheng, was a farmer. After Gu's ascension to top posts in Beijing, he commissioned an author to write what was widely regarded as a hagiography of his father titled Struggle for Life and Death (生死记忆) as a testament to his own revolutionary heritage. Gu's father is buried in a prominent local cemetery with the conspicuous "revolutionary hero" designation written on his tombstone.
