= Zhang Zhen (general) =

Chinese military commander, general of the People's Liberation Army

- 张震
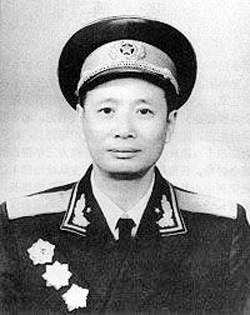

Vice Chairman of the Central Military Commission of the Chinese Communist Party
- In office 18 October 1992 – 18 September 1997 Serving with Liu Huaqing, Chi Haotian and Zhang Wannian
- Chairman: Jiang Zemin

Head of the PLA General Logistics Department
- In office February 1978 – January 1980
- Preceded by: Zhang Zongxun
- Succeeded by: Hong Xuezhi

Head of the PLA General Staff Operations Department
- In office March 1952 – December 1954
- Preceded by: Li Tao
- Succeeded by: Wang Shangrong

Personal details
- Born: 5 October 1914 Pingjiang County, Hunan, Republic of China
- Died: 3 September 2015 (aged 100) Beijing, China
- Party: Chinese Communist Party

Military service
- Allegiance: People's Republic of China
- Branch/service: Chinese Red Army; New Fourth Army; People's Liberation Army Ground Force
- Years of service: 1930–1998
- Rank: General
- Battles/wars: Second Sino-Japanese War; Chinese Civil War; Korean War

Chinese name
- Simplified Chinese: 张震
- Traditional Chinese: 張震
Transcriptions
Standard Mandarin
- Hanyu Pinyin: Zhāng Zhèn

Zhang Zhen (simplified Chinese: 张震; traditional Chinese: 張震; pinyin: Zhāng Zhèn, 5 October 1914 – 3 September 2015) was a general of the Chinese People's Liberation Army (PLA) and a vice chairman of the Central Military Commission (CMC) from 1992 to 1997. A veteran of the Long March, he was chief of staff of the Third Field Army during the Chinese Civil War, and he later served as director of the PLA's General Logistics Department and as the first president of the National Defense University. He was made a lieutenant general in 1955 and a general in 1988, and at his death he was the last survivor of the generals named in 1955.

== Early life ==
Zhang was born on 5 October 1914 in Pingjiang County, Hunan to a family of Hakka ethnicity, and was originally named Zhang Jiansheng. He was born into a poor family, and he later took the name Zhen in honour of the loyalty of the Song dynasty general Yue Fei. His family's ancestral home was in Pingyuan County, Guangdong. In 1926, he became deputy head of a children's corps in his home town, and in 1928 he joined the Pingjiang Young Pioneers and took part in two attacks on the county town. In May 1930, he joined the Communist Youth League and the Red Army, and in October 1930 he became a member of the Chinese Communist Party.

== Military career ==
Zhang served as a propagandist and then as a political instructor in the Red 5th Army, and he took part in the Red Army's two attacks on Changsha. He later became communications director and battalion commander in the 10th Regiment of the 4th Division of the Red Third Army Group, and he fought in all five of the Nationalist encirclement campaigns against the Central Soviet Area. In October 1934, he set out from Yudu County in Jiangxi on the Long March as an operations staff officer of the 10th Regiment, and he later commanded the regiment's 3rd Battalion. He took part in the crossing of the Xiang River and the four crossings of the Chishui River. After the Red Army reached northern Shaanxi, he became chief of staff of the 12th Regiment of the 4th Division in May 1936. In February 1937, he entered the Counter-Japanese Military and Political University.

=== Second Sino-Japanese War ===
After the full-scale Second Sino-Japanese War began, Zhang worked at the Eighth Route Army's liaison office in Shanxi. In February 1938, he became chief of staff of a rear unit of the New Fourth Army and of the military department of the party's Henan committee, based in Queshan County. In September 1938, he became chief of staff of a New Fourth Army guerrilla detachment under Peng Xuefeng, and he was wounded in the leg at Huaiyang that October. In 1940, he served as chief of staff of the New Fourth Army's 6th Detachment and then of the Eighth Route Army's 4th Column. After the New Fourth Army incident of 1941, he became chief of staff of the New Fourth Army's 4th Division and of the Huaibei Military District. In December 1944, he also took command of the 4th Division's 11th Brigade and of the western Huaibei military subdistrict.

=== Chinese Civil War ===
At the start of the Chinese Civil War, Zhang was commander and political commissar of the 9th Column. In February 1947, he became deputy commander of the 2nd Column of the East China Field Army, and he fought in the Laiwu and Menglianggu campaigns. In March 1948, he became chief of staff of the field army's 1st Corps and deputy chief of staff of the East China Field Army. He assisted its commander, Su Yu, in the campaign in eastern Henan in June 1948 and the Jinan campaign that autumn, and he took part in the Huaihai campaign from November 1948. In March 1949, he became chief of staff of the Third Field Army, and he took part in the crossing of the Yangtze and the Shanghai Campaign.

=== Korea ===
In March 1952, Zhang became director of the Operations Department of the PLA General Staff. In May 1953, he was sent to Korea as acting commander and political commissar of the 24th Army of the People's Volunteer Army, and he took part in the summer offensives of the Korean War in 1953, including the Kumsong offensive. He was injured in Korea when a vehicle wheel ran over his waist, and he resumed work after regaining consciousness about three hours later.

=== Post war ===
In December 1953, he proposed seizing the Dachen Islands before attacking Kinmen. In December 1954, Zhang entered the first campaign course of the PLA Military Academy in Nanjing, which was headed by Marshal Liu Bocheng. He was made a lieutenant general in September 1955. He became deputy president of the academy in September 1957 and its president in September 1962. During the Cultural Revolution, Zhang was persecuted and sent to work at the machinery plant of the Wuhan Iron and Steel Company. In December 1970, he returned to duty as deputy commander of the Wuhan Military Region, and he also served as political commissar of the headquarters for the construction of the Gezhouba Dam. From January 1972, he was responsible for military training in the Wuhan Military Region.

In August 1975, Zhang became deputy director of the General Logistics Department, and in February 1978 he became its director. He was a member of the Central Military Commission (CMC) from August 1977 to September 1982. In January 1980, he became a deputy chief of the General Staff.

In March 1985, Zhang was put in charge of establishing the National Defense University. At the request of Yang Shangkun, he oversaw the merger of the PLA's military, political and logistics academies into the new university. He became its first president in November 1985, and in April 1990 he also became its political commissar. He required senior officers to study there as ordinary students.

=== Vice chairman of the Central Military Commission ===
In October 1992, at the age of 78, Zhang became a vice chairman of the party's CMC, under its chairman, Jiang Zemin. According to an account published in 2005 by the party history journal Xiangchao, Deng Xiaoping asked him to help Jiang rebuild the military leadership over about three years, telling him, "You are ten years younger than me, you can still serve another term." Zhang set himself the rule to "do real work, appear in public less, and not overstep his authority". In March 1993, he also became a vice chairman of the state Central Military Commission.

During his tenure, Zhang pushed for a younger and more professional officer corps, and a three-year plan lowered the average age of the senior leaders of the headquarters and military regions by 1995. He was a leading opponent of the PLA's commercial activities, warning that "business will inevitably cause corruption in the military, and a corrupt army has no combat power". In 1993, the CMC barred units below army level from commercial production, and in 1998 the party leadership barred the armed forces from business altogether. Zhang also oversaw the formation of the Hong Kong Garrison, which entered Hong Kong at the handover on 1 July 1997.

During the Third Taiwan Strait Crisis, Zhang and Liu Huaqing, the two most senior figures in the PLA, attended an emergency meeting of the party's Taiwan Affairs Leading Small Group in mid-June 1995, which was called after the visit of the Taiwanese president Lee Teng-hui to the United States. Political scientist Andrew Scobell wrote that the military leaders "definitely charged the atmosphere and ensured a change of policy". He described the crisis as Liu and Zhang's "last hurrah".

Before the 15th Party Congress in September 1997, Zhang, who was due to retire, told the army to dedicate itself "heart and soul" to the party's Central Committee. He left the party's Central Military Commission in 1997, and he left his remaining leadership posts in March 1998. He was an alternate member of the 11th Central Committee of the Chinese Communist Party, and a full member of the 12th and 14th Central Committees. He was also elected to the Central Advisory Commission in 1985 and 1987. He was promoted to the rank of general in September 1988.

== Later life ==
In 2001, Zhang visited Hong Kong and Macau with his wife, and he expressed the hope of visiting Taiwan under the policy of "one country, two systems". His memoirs were edited by Ni Qisheng, a member of the National Defense University's first class.

Zhang died in Beijing on 3 September 2015, at the age of 100, on the day of the celebrations of the 70th anniversary of the end of the Second World War. Chinese state media gave his age as 101. An obituary issued by the party leadership called him "a time-tested and loyal communist soldier" and "an outstanding leader of the People's Liberation Army of China". His funeral was held in Beijing on 9 September 2015, and Xi Jinping attended it.

== Personal life ==
Zhang was married to Ma Lingsong. His son Zhang Haiyang became a general, and three other sons, Zhang Xiaoyang, Zhang Lianyang and Zhang Ningyang, became major generals, as did his son-in-law, Shou Xiaosong.

== Honours ==
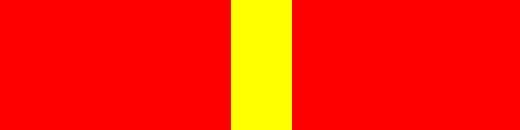
Order of August 1 (1st Class Medal) (1955)
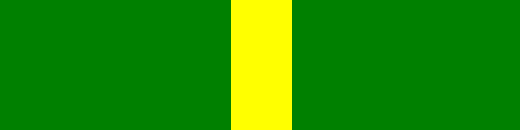
Order of Independence and Freedom (1st Class Medal) (1955)
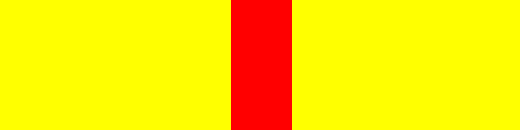
Order of Liberation (1st Class Medal) (1955)

Military offices
Preceded by Li Tao	Head of the People's Liberation Army General Staff Operations Department; 1952–1954	Succeeded by Wang Shangrong
Preceded by Zhang Zongxun	Head of the People's Liberation Army General Logistics Department; 1978–1980	Succeeded by Hong Xuezhi
Academic offices
New title	President of the PLA National Defense University; 1985–1992	Succeeded by Zhu Dunfa
Preceded by Li Desheng	Political Commissar of the PLA National Defense University; 1990–1992	Succeeded by Li Wenqing
