= Li Changcai =

Chinese general

- 李长才

Political Commissar of the Lanzhou Military Region
- In office 2007 – July 2014
- Preceded by: Yu Linxiang
- Succeeded by: Miao Hua

Personal details
- Born: January 1949 (age 77) Hefei, Anhui, China
- Party: Chinese Communist Party

Military service
- Allegiance: People's Republic of China
- Branch/service: People's Liberation Army Ground Force
- Years of service: 1969–2014
- Rank: General

Li Changcai (simplified Chinese: 李长才; traditional Chinese: 李長才; pinyin: Lǐ Chángcái; born January 1949) is a retired general in the People's Liberation Army of China. He served as the political commissar of Lanzhou Military Region.

== Biography ==
Li was born in Hefei, Anhui in January 1949. In September 2000, he became political commissar of the 31st Group Army. In July 2005, he became director of political department of Nanjing Military Region. He was elevated to deputy political commissar of Nanjing Military Region in December 2006. In September 2007, he was appointed as political commissar of Lanzhou Military Region.

He was a member of the 17th Central Committee of the Chinese Communist Party.

Military offices
Preceded by Zhang Lizhi	Political Commissar of the 31st Group Army; 2000–2005	Succeeded by Wang Jian
Preceded by Gao Wusheng	Director of the Political Department of the Nanjing Military Region; 2005–2006	Succeeded by Chu Yimin
Preceded by Yu Linxiang	Political Commissar of the Lanzhou Military Region; 2007–2014	Succeeded by Miao Hua
