= Hou Jizhen =

- 侯继振
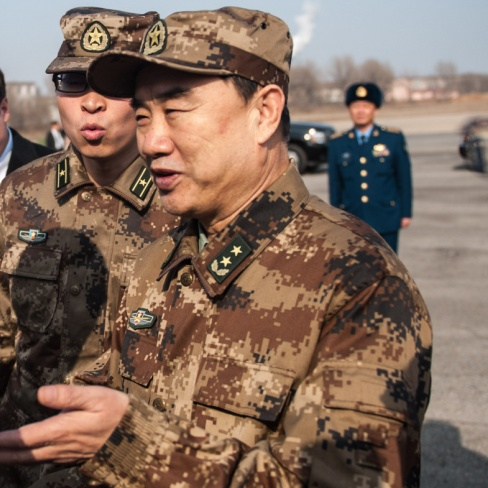
- Hou Jizhen in 2014

Chief of Staff of the Shenyang Military Region
- In office June 2009 – January 2014
- Preceded by: Hou Shusen
- Succeeded by: Xu Jingnian

Personal details
- Born: November 1951 (age 74) Xiajin County, Shandong, China
- Party: Chinese Communist Party

Military service
- Allegiance: People's Republic of China
- Branch/service: People's Liberation Army Ground Force
- Years of service: ?–2014
- Rank: Lieutenant general

Chinese name
- Simplified Chinese: 侯继振
- Traditional Chinese: 侯繼振
Transcriptions
Standard Mandarin
- Hanyu Pinyin: Hóu Jìzhèn

Hou Jizhen (Chinese: 侯继振; born November 1951) is a retired lieutenant general (zhongjiang) of the People's Liberation Army (PLA) who served as chief of staff of the Shenyang Military Region from 2009 to 2014. He was a representative of 17th National Congress of the Chinese Communist Party.

== Biography ==
Hou was born in Xiajin County, Shandong, in November 1951. He served in the 23rd Army for a long time. In December 2003, he was appointed commander of the 40th Group Army, replacing Wang Guosheng. In December 2005, he was commissioned as commander of the 16th Group Army, succeeding Guan Kai. In June 2009, he rose to become chief of staff of the Shenyang Military Region, and then deputy commander of the region in December 2013, serving in the post until his retirement in December 2014.

He was promoted to the rank of major general (shaojiang) in 2002 and lieutenant general (zhongjiang) in July 2010.

Military offices
Preceded by Wang Guosheng	Commander of the 40th Group Army; 2003–2005	Succeeded by Peng Bo
Preceded by Guan Kai	Commander of the 16th Group Army; 2005–2009	Succeeded by Gao Guanghui
Preceded by Hou Shusen	Chief of Staff of the Shenyang Military Region; 2009–2014	Succeeded by Xu Jingnian
