= Sui Mingtai =

Chinese general

- 隋明太

Political Commissar of the People's Armed Police
- In office December 2003 – September 2007
- Preceded by: Xu Yongqing
- Succeeded by: Yu Linxiang

Political Commissar of the PLA Second Artillery Corps
- In office December 1997 – December 2003
- Preceded by: Sui Yongju
- Succeeded by: Peng Xiaofeng

Personal details
- Born: September 1942 (age 84) Zhaoyuan County, Shandong, China
- Party: Chinese Communist Party
- Education: PLA Military and Political University; PLA National Defence University

Military service
- Allegiance: People's Republic of China
- Branch/service: PLA Second Artillery Corps (1962–2003); People's Armed Police (2003–2007)
- Years of service: 1960–2007
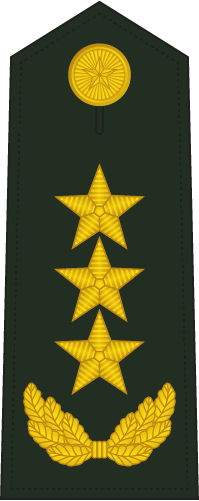
- Rank: general
- Unit: PLA Engineering Corps

Sui Mingtai (Chinese: 隋明太; pinyin: Suí Míngtài; born September 1942) is a general in the People's Liberation Army of China. He was a member of the 15th and 16th Central Committee of the Chinese Communist Party. He was a member of the Standing Committee of the 11th National People's Congress.

== Biography ==
Sui was born in Zhaoyuan County (now Zhaoyuan), Shandong, in September 1942. He graduated from the PLA Military and Political University and PLA National Defence University.

He enlisted in the People's Liberation Army (PLA) in August 1960, and joined the Chinese Communist Party (CCP) in July 1962. He served in the PLA Engineering Corps from 1960 to 1982. He served as deputy political commissar of the PLA Second Artillery Corps Base in 1983, and five years later promoted to the political commissar position. In June 1990, he became deputy director of its Political Department, rising to director in December 1994. In November 1997, he was promoted to become political commissar of the PLA Second Artillery Corps, a position he held until December 2003, when he was chosen as political commissar of the People's Armed Police. In March 2008, he took office as vice chairperson of the National People's Congress Supervisory and Judicial Affairs Committee.

He was promoted to the rank of major general (shaojiang) in September 1988, lieutenant general (zhongjiang) in July 1996, and general (shangjiang) in 2004.

Military offices
Preceded by Sui Yongju	Political Commissar of the PLA Second Artillery Corps; 1997–2003	Succeeded by Peng Xiaofeng
Preceded by Xu Yongqing	Political Commissar of the People's Armed Police; 2003–2007	Succeeded by Yu Linxiang
