= Du Tiehuan =

People's Liberation Army general

- 杜铁环

Political Commissioner of the Beijing Military Region
- In office November 1996 – December 2003
- Preceded by: Gu Shanqing
- Succeeded by: Fu Tinggui

Political Commissioner of the Jinan Military Region
- In office December 1994 – November 1996
- Preceded by: Song Qingwei
- Succeeded by: Xu Caihou

Personal details
- Born: August 1938 (age 88) Anshan, Liaoning, Manchukuo
- Party: Chinese Communist Party
- Education: PLA Fifth Artillery School; PLA Political College

Military service
- Allegiance: People's Republic of China
- Branch/service: People's Liberation Army Ground Force
- Years of service: 1955–2003
- Rank: General
- Battles/wars: Sino-Vietnamese War

Chinese name
- Simplified Chinese: 杜铁环
- Traditional Chinese: 杜鐵環
Transcriptions
Standard Mandarin
- Hanyu Pinyin: Dù Tiěhuán

Du Tiehuan (Chinese: 杜铁环; born August 1938) is a general (shangjiang) of the People's Liberation Army (PLA). He was a member of the 15th Central Committee of the Chinese Communist Party and a delegate to the 9th National People's Congress.

== Biography ==
Du was born in Anshan, Liaoning, Manchukuo in August 1938.

He enlisted in the People's Liberation Army (PLA) in August 1955, and joined the Chinese Communist Party (CCP) in September 1959. In 1979, he participated in the Sino-Vietnamese War. In 1984, he served in the 46th Group Army for a short while before being assigned to the 67th Group Army as deputy political commissioner in 1985, and he rose to become political commissioner in 1988. He was assistant head of the People's Liberation Army General Political Department in November 1992, and one year later was promoted to deputy head. In December 1994, he was appointed political commissioner of the Jinan Military Region, he remained in that position until November 1996, when he was transferred to the Beijing Military Region and appointed political commissioner.

He was promoted to the rank of major general (shaojiang) in 1988, lieutenant general (zhongjiang) in 1993 and general (shangjiang) in 2000.

Military offices
Preceded by Song Qingwei	Political Commissioner of the Jinan Military Region; 1994–1996	Succeeded by Xu Caihou
Preceded by Gu Shanqing	Political Commissioner of the Beijing Military Region; 1996–2003	Succeeded by Fu Tinggui
