= Song Qingwei =

Chinese politician (1929–2022)

- 宋清渭

Political Commissar of the Jinan Military Region
- In office November 1987 – December 1994
- Commander: Li Jiulong; Zhang Wannian; Zhang Taiheng
- Preceded by: Chi Haotian
- Succeeded by: Du Tiehuan

Personal details
- Born: Song Qinghu (宋清湖); March 1929 Ling County, Shandong, China
- Died: 27 December 2022 (aged 93)
- Party: Chinese Communist Party

Military service
- Allegiance: People's Republic of China
- Branch/service: People's Liberation Army Ground Force
- Years of service: 1945–2003
- Rank: General
- Battles/wars: Chinese Civil War
- Awards: Order of Liberation (3rd Class; 1955)

Song Qingwei (Chinese: 宋清渭; pinyin: Sòng Qīngwèi; born March 1929 – 27 December 2022) was a general in the People's Liberation Army of China who was a political commissar of the Jinan Military Region from 1987 to 1994.

He was a delegate to the 6th and 7th National People's Congress and a member of the standing committee of the 9th National People's Congress. He was a representative of the 13th, 14th and 15th National Congress of the Chinese Communist Party. He was a member of the 14th Central Committee of the Chinese Communist Party.

== Biography ==
Song was born Song Qinghu (宋清湖) in Ling County (now Lincheng District of Dezhou), Shandong, in March 1929.

He enlisted in the Eighth Route Army in June 1945, and joined the Chinese Communist Party (CCP) in October the same year. He served in the Bohai Military Area before being assigned to the East China Field Army in 1948.

After the establishment of the Communist State, he served in the Fuzhou Military District for a long time. In June 1985, he was made deputy political commissar of the Jinan Military Region], rising to political commissar in November 1987. He retired in July 2003.

He was promoted to the rank of lieutenant general (zhongjiang) in September 1988 and general (shangjiang) in May 1994.

From 1998 to 2003, he was the vice chairman of the National People's Congress Foreign Affairs Committee.

In 2022, Son died from COVID-19 at the age of 93.

== Work ==
- 岁月纪实 宋清渭回忆录 [Documentary of Years, Memoirs of Song Qingwei] (in Chinese). Beijing: PLA Publishing House. 2009. ISBN 9787506557948.

Military offices
Preceded by Chi Haotian	Political Commissar of the Jinan Military Region; 1987–1994	Succeeded by Du Tiehuan
