= Guan Kai =

Chinese politician

- 关凯
- Born: March , 1948; Dongming, Shandong Province
- Died: July 21, 2024 (aged 76); Beijing
- Military career
- Allegiance: People's Republic of China
- Branch: People's Liberation Army
- Service years: 1968–2024
- Rank: Lieutenant General
- Commands: 16th Group Army

Guan Kai (March 1948 – July 21, 2024, Chinese: 关凯), a native of Dongming, Shandong Province, held the rank of lieutenant general in the People's Liberation Army (PLA).

== Biography ==
In February 1968, Guan enlisted in the PLA and subsequently became a member of the Chinese Communist Party (CCP) in December. Before ascending the ranks, he was the director of the Operations Department at the Shenyang Military Region Command. He subsequently served as the Chief of Staff, Deputy Commander, and Commander of the 16th Group Army of the People's Liberation Army. He was the Deputy Commander of the Lanzhou Military Region from December 2005 to June 2011. He was promoted to Major General in 1999, and he was granted the rank of colonel in 1988. He ultimately achieved the rank of Lieutenant General in 2007.

Guan Kai has served as a delegate to the 11th National People's Congress and a member of the Standing Committee of the 12th National Committee of the Chinese People's Political Consultative Conference (CPPCC) since 2008.

At the age of 76, Guan died in Beijing on July 21, 2024.

Military offices
Preceded by Fan Changlong	Commander of the 16th Group Army; 2000-2005	Succeeded by Hou Jizhen
