= Hōji =

Hōji is a romaji which can refer to:

- Hōji (era) (宝治), a Japanese era name
- Hōji (Buddhism) (法事), a periodical Buddhist memorial service on behalf of a deceased person
- Hōjicha (焙じ茶, ほうじ茶), a roasted Japanese green tea

== See also ==
- Houji (disambiguation)
