= General Logistics Department =

The General Logistics Department of the People's Liberation Army (GLD; Chinese: 中国人民解放军总后勤部) was a former chief organ under China's Central Military Commission. Before 2016, it organized and led the logistics construction and oversees housing, supplies, hospitals, and barracks of the People's Liberation Army. The department was disbanded in January 2016 and the new agency, Logistic Support Department of the Central Military Commission was founded.

== Leadership ==
=== Directors ===
- Yang Lisan (1949–1953)
- Huang Kecheng (1954–1956)
- Hong Xuezhi (1956–1959)
- Qiu Huizuo (1959)
- Zhang Zhen (?1960–1975?)
- Zhang Zongxun (1975)
- Hong Xuezhi (1980–1987)
- Zhao Nanqi (1988–1992)
- Fu Quanyou (1992–1994)
- Wang Ke (1995–?)
- Zhao Keshi

=== Political Commissars ===
- Huang Kecheng
- Yu Qiuli
- Li Jukui
- Zhang Chiming
- Guo Linxiang
- Wang Ping
- Hong Xuezhi
- Liu Anyuan
- Zhou Keyu
- Zhou Kunren
- Zhang Wentai
- Sun Dafa
- Liu Yuan

== See also ==
- Chinese Military Reform
