= 15th Central Committee of the Chinese Communist Party =

In session from 1997 to 2002

The 15th Central Committee of the Chinese Communist Party was in session from 1997 to 2002. The 14th Central Committee preceded it. It was followed by the 16th Central Committee of the Chinese Communist Party. This was the first Central Committee that current CCP general secretary Xi Jinping was elected to, as an alternative member.

It elected the 15th Politburo of the Chinese Communist Party in 1997. Plenary sessions were held by the politburo.

== Members ==
In stroke order of surnames:

1. Ding Wenchang (丁文昌)
2. Ding Guangen (丁关根)
3. Yu Yongbo (于永波)
4. Ma Zhongchen (马忠臣)
5. Wang Ke (王克)
6. Wang Yunkun (王云坤)
7. Wang Lequan (王乐泉)
8. Wang Zhaoguo
9. Wang Maolin (王茂林)
10. Wang Maorun (王茂润)
11. Wang Zhongyu (王忠禹)
12. Wang Luolin (王洛林)
13. Wang Mengkui (王梦奎)
14. Wang Ruilin (王瑞林)
15. Yun Bulong (云布龙)
16. Mao Rubai (毛如柏)
17. Fang Zuqi (方祖岐)
18. Shi Yunsheng (石云生)
19. Lu Rongjing (卢荣景)
20. Lu Ruihua (卢瑞华)
21. Ye Liansong (叶连松)
22. Tian Fengshan (田凤山)
23. Tian Chengping (田成平)
24. Tian Jiyun (田纪云)
25. Bai Lichen (白立忱)
26. Bai Enpei (白恩培)
27. Linghu An (令狐安)
28. Bao Xuding (包叙定)
29. Ismail Amat (司马义·艾买提)
30. Xing Shizhong (邢世忠)
31. Hui Liangyu (回良玉)
32. Zhu Lilan (朱丽兰)
33. Zhu Yuli (朱育理)
34. Zhu Rongji
35. Wu Shaozu (伍绍祖)
36. Hua Guofeng
37. Doje Cering (多吉才让)
38. Liu Jiang (刘江)
39. Liu Qi
40. Liu Yunshan (刘云山)
41. Liu Fangren (刘方仁)
42. Liu Shutian (刘书田)
43. Liu Zhongli (刘仲藜)
44. Liu Huaqiu (刘华秋)
45. Liu Jiyuan (刘纪原)
46. Liu Mingzu (刘明祖)
47. Liu Zhongde (刘忠德)
48. Liu Shunyao (刘顺尧)
49. Liu Jianfeng (刘剑锋)
50. Liu Jingsong (刘精松)
51. Jiang Zemin
52. Sun Ying (孙英)
53. Sun Wensheng (孙文盛)
54. Sun Jiazheng (孙家正)
55. Du Qinglin (杜青林)
56. Du Tiehuan (杜铁环)
57. Li Peng
58. Li Changchun
59. Li Zhaozhuo (李兆焯)
60. Li Keqiang
61. Li Lanqing
62. Li Lianghui (李良辉)
63. Li Jinhua
64. Li Zemin (李泽民)
65. Li Jianguo (李建国)
66. Li Chunting (李春亭)
67. Li Guixian (李贵鲜)
68. Li Tieying (李铁映)
69. Li Jinai (李继耐)
70. Li Shenglin (李盛霖)
71. Li Ruihuan
72. Li Xinliang (李新良)
73. Li Dezhu (李德洙)
74. Yang Zhengwu (杨正午)
75. Yang Huaiqing (杨怀庆)
76. Yang Guoping (杨国屏)
77. Yang Guoliang (杨国梁)
78. Xiao Yang
79. Wu Yi
80. Wu Bangguo
81. Wu Yixia (吴亦侠)
82. Wu Guanzheng
83. Wu Jichuan (吴基传)
84. He Yong (何勇)
85. He Chunlin (何椿霖)
86. Wang Xiaofeng (汪啸风)
87. Song Jian (宋健)
88. Song Baorui (宋宝瑞)
89. Song Ruixiang (宋瑞祥)
90. Song Defu (宋德福)
91. Chi Haotian (迟浩田)
92. Zhang Gong (张工)
93. Zhang Dinghua (张丁华)
94. Zhang Wannian (张万年)
95. Zhang Wenyue (张文岳)
96. Zhang Wenkang (张文康)
97. Zhang Lichang (张立昌)
98. Zhang Zhijian (张志坚)
99. Zhang Guoguang (张国光)
100. Zhang Siqing
101. Zhang Junjiu (张俊九)
102. Zhang Weiqing (张维庆)
103. Zhang Fusen
104. Zhang Dejiang (张德江)
105. Zhang Delin (张德邻)
106. Abdul'ahat Abdulrixit (阿不来提·阿不都热西提)
107. Chen Yunlin (陈云林)
108. Chen Bangzhu (陈邦柱)
109. Chen Zhili (陈至立)
110. Chen Guangyi (陈光毅)
111. Chen Mingyi (陈明义)
112. Chen Kuiyuan (陈奎元)
113. Chen Bingde (陈炳德)
114. Chen Huanyou (陈焕友)
115. Chen Yaobang (陈耀邦)
116. Shao Huaze (邵华泽)
117. Lin Liyun (林丽韫)
118. Luo Gan
119. Zhou Ziyu (周子玉)
120. Zhou Yongkang
121. Zhou Guangzhao (周光召)
122. Zhou Kunren (周坤仁)
123. Zheng Bijian (郑必坚)
124. Zheng Silin (郑斯林)
125. Xiang Huaicheng (项怀诚)
126. Hao Jianxiu (郝建秀)
127. Hu Fuguo (胡富国)
128. Hu Jintao
129. Niu Maosheng (钮茂生)
130. Yu Zhengsheng (俞正声)
131. Wen Shizhen (闻世震)
132. Jiang Chunyun (姜春云)
133. Jiang Enzhu (姜恩柱)
134. Jiang Futang (姜福堂)
135. Hong Hu (洪虎)
136. He Guoqiang
137. Raidi (热地)
138. Gui Shiyong (桂世镛)
139. Jia Qinglin
140. Jia Zhijie (贾志杰)
141. Jia Chunwang
142. Gu Xiulian (顾秀莲)
143. Chai Songyue (柴松岳)
144. Qian Qichen
145. Qian Guoliang (钱国梁)
146. Qian Shugen (钱树根)
147. Ni Zhifu (倪志福)
148. Xu Caihou (徐才厚)
149. Xu Yongqing (徐永清)
150. Xu Kuangdi
151. Xu Youfang (徐有芳)
152. Gao Yan (高严)
153. Guo Dongpo (郭东坡)
154. Guo Boxiong (郭伯雄)
155. Guo Chaoren (郭超人)
156. Tang Tianbiao (唐天标)
157. Tang Jiaxuan
158. Tao Bojun (陶伯钧)
159. Tao Siju
160. Huang Ju
161. Huang Qizao (黄启璪)
162. Huang Zhendong (黄镇东)
163. Cao Gangchuan
164. Cao Bochun (曹伯纯)
165. Sheng Huaren (盛华仁)
166. Yan Haiwang (阎海旺)
167. Liang Guanglie (梁光烈)
168. Wei Jianxing (尉健行)
169. Sui Mingtai (隋明太)
170. Wei Fulin (隗福临)
171. Peng Peiyun (彭珮云)
172. Jiang Zhuping (蒋祝平)
173. Han Zhubin
174. Cheng Andong (程安东)
175. Cheng Weigao (程维高)
176. Fu Quanyou (傅全有)
177. Fu Zhihuan (傅志寰)
178. Shu Shengyou (舒圣佑)
179. Shu Huiguo (舒惠国)
180. Zeng Qinghong
181. Zeng Peiyan (曾培炎)
182. Wen Zongren (温宗仁)
183. Wen Jiabao
184. Xie Fei (谢非)
185. Xie Shijie (谢世杰)
186. Pu Haiqing (蒲海清)
187. Lei Mingqiu (雷鸣球)
188. Lu Yongxiang (路甬祥)
189. Liao Hui (廖晖)
190. Liao Xilong (廖锡龙)
191. Teng Wensheng (滕文生)
192. Dai Bingguo (戴秉国)
193. Dai Xianglong (戴相龙)

== Brief chronology ==
1. 1st Plenary Session
  - Date: September 19, 1997
  - Location: Beijing
  - Significance: Jiang Zemin was re-appointed General Secretary of the Chinese Communist Party and Chairman of the Central Military Commission. A 24-members Politburo, a 7-members Politburo Standing Committee and a 7-members Secretariat were elected.
2. 2nd Plenary Session
  - Date: February 25–26, 1998
  - Location: Beijing
  - Significance: The meeting approved lists of nominees for top posts of the 9th National People's Congress and the 9th National Committee of the Chinese People's Political Consultative Conference and a proposal for reforming the State Council.
3. 3rd Plenary Session
  - Date: October 12–14, 1998
  - Location: Beijing
  - Significance: The meeting reviewed the previous 20 years of economic reform and set the goal to establish new rural towns according to socialism with Chinese characteristics by 2010.
4. 4th Plenary Session
  - Date: September 19–22, 1999
  - Location: Beijing
  - Significance: The reform of the state-owned enterprises was launched aiming at establishing a "modern enterprise system". It emphasized that state ownership should be dominant in "important industries and key areas" and in "backbone enterprises in important industries". Hu Jintao was appointed vice-chairman of the Central Military Commission.
5. 5th Plenary Session
  - Date: October 9–11, 2000
  - Location: Beijing
  - Significance: Premier Zhu Rongji delivered a report on the guidelines for 10th Five-Year Plan, proclaiming modernization, opening up and technological progress as its basic goals. The meeting also decided upon China's accession to the World Trade Organization and urged the Party to apply Jiang Zemin's Three Represents, exposed by the Party General Secretary in February of the same year. The plan for China's western development was formally put forward during the Fifth Plenary Session.
6. 6th Plenary Session
  - Date: September 24–26, 2001
  - Location: Beijing
  - Significance: The meeting celebrated the 80th anniversary of the establishment of the CCP, with General Secretary Jiang Zeming speaking about it, and adopted a Decision of the CCP Central Committee to Strengthen and Improve the Party's Work Style based on the Three Represents, allowing capitalists to join the Party.
7. 7th Plenary Session
  - Date: November 3–5, 2002
  - Location: Beijing
  - Significance: Preparations for the Party's 16th National Congress were made. The meeting proclaimed Deng Xiaoping Theory and the Three Represents as the guideline for China "in the new century and new stage of reform and opening up and socialist modernization".
