= Zhang Wentai =

Chinese military personnel

- 张文台

Political Commissioner of the People's Liberation Army General Logistics Department
- In office October 2002 – June 2005
- Preceded by: Zhou Kunren
- Succeeded by: Sun Dafa

Political Commissioner of the Jinan Military Region
- In office September 1999 – October 2002
- Preceded by: Xu Caihou
- Succeeded by: Liu Dongdong

Personal details
- Born: April 1940 (age 86) Jiaozhou County, Shandong, China
- Party: Chinese Communist Party
- Education: Central Party School of the Chinese Communist Party

Military service
- Allegiance: People's Republic of China
- Branch/service: People's Liberation Army Ground Force
- Years of service: 1958–2005
- Rank: General

Chinese name
- Simplified Chinese: 张文台
- Traditional Chinese: 張文台
Transcriptions
Standard Mandarin
- Hanyu Pinyin: Zhāng Wéntái

Zhang Wentai (Chinese: 张文台; born April 1940) is a general (shangjiang) of the People's Liberation Army (PLA). He was a member of the 16th Central Committee of the Chinese Communist Party.

== Biography ==
Zhang was born in Jiaozhou County (now Jiaozhou City), Shandong, in April 1940.

He enlisted in the People's Liberation Army (PLA) in December 1958, and joined the Chinese Communist Party (CCP) in September 1960. He served in Changbaishan Fortress Area between 1958 and 1975. In February 1975, he was assigned to Jinan Military Region, where he moved up the ranks to become deputy political commissioner in December 1993 and political commissioner in September 1999. He became political commissioner of the People's Liberation Army General Logistics Department in October 2002, and served until June 2005. In December 2005, he was made vice chairperson of the National People's Congress Environment Protection and Resources Conservation Committee, a position he held until March 2013.

He was promoted to the rank of major general (shaojiang) in September 1988, lieutenant general (zhongjiang) in July 1995 and general (shangjiang) in June 2004.

== Personal life ==
His son-in-law, Chen Jie, political commissar of the 42nd Group Army and deputy political commissar of the Southern Theater Command Ground Force, suicided by taking sleeping pills in August 2016.

== Publication ==
- 张文台文丛 [Collected Works of Zhang Wentai] (in Chinese). Beijing: Central Party Literature Press. 1999. ISBN 9787507339635.
- 聊天新语 [Chat Neologisms] (in Chinese). Beijing: Huaxia Publishing House. 2006. ISBN 9787508040165.
- 来自实践的领导艺术 [Leadership from Practice] (in Chinese). Beijing: Military Science Press. 2003. ISBN 9787801375919.
- 病中抒怀 [Expressing Feelings in Illness] (in Chinese). Beijing: People's Literature Publishing House. 1999. ISBN 9787020066469.
- 生态智道 [Ecological Wisdom] (in Chinese). Hangzhou, Zhejiang: Zhejiang People's Publishing House. 1999. ISBN 9787213061110.
- Zhang Wentai (张文台); Chen Shoupeng (陈寿朋); Xu Weixin (徐伟新), eds. (2010). 生态文明建设论：领导干部需要把握的十个基本体系 [On the Construction of Ecological Civilization: Ten Basic Systems of Leaders] (in Chinese). Beijing: CCP Central Party School Press. ISBN 9787503542879.
- Zhang Wentai, ed. (2012). 中国环境文库：生态文明十论 [Talking About Ecological Civilization] (in Chinese). Beijing: China Environmental Publishing House. ISBN 9787511107541.
- Zhang Quanjing (张全景); Zhang Wentai (张文台); Zhou Chang'an (周长安), eds. (2013). 焦裕禄在兰考的470天 [Jiao Yulu's 470 days in Lankao] (in Chinese). Zhengzhou, Henan: Zhongzhou Ancient Books Publishing House. ISBN 9787534843402.

Military offices
Preceded by Zhou Kunren	Political Commissioner of the Jinan Military Region; 1999–2002	Succeeded by Sun Dafa
Preceded by Xu Caihou	Political Commissioner of the People's Liberation Army General Logistics Department; 2002–2005	Succeeded by Liu Dongdong
