= Liu Dongdong =

Chinese general (1945–2015)

- 刘冬冬

Political Commissar of the Jinan Military Region
- In office November 2002 – July 2010
- Preceded by: Zhang Wentai
- Succeeded by: Du Hengyan

Political Commissar of the Lanzhou Military Region
- In office 2000–2002
- Preceded by: Wen Zongren
- Succeeded by: Liu Yongzhi

Personal details
- Born: October 1, 1945 Huangpi County, Hubei, China
- Died: 25 February 2015 (aged 69) Beijing, China
- Party: Chinese Communist Party

Military service
- Allegiance: People's Republic of China
- Branch/service: People's Liberation Army Ground Force
- Years of service: 1961–2010
- Rank: General
- Commands: Lanzhou Military Region; Jinan Military Region

Chinese name
- Simplified Chinese: 刘冬冬
- Traditional Chinese: 劉冬冬
Transcriptions
Standard Mandarin
- Hanyu Pinyin: Liú Dōngdōng

Liu Dongdong (Chinese: 刘冬冬; pinyin: Liú Dōngdōng; October 1, 1945 – 25 February 2015) was a general (shangjiang) of the People's Liberation Army of China. He served as political commissar of the Jinan Military Region.

== Biography ==
Liu was born in Huangpi, Hubei Province in 1945. He joined the army in 1961, and the Chinese Communist Party in 1963. He attained the rank of major general in 1992, lieutenant general in 1999, and full general in 2004. He died in Beijing on 25 February 2015, at the age of 69.

Liu was a member of the 16th and 17th Central Committees of the Chinese Communist Party.

Military offices
Preceded by Wen Zongren	Political Commissar of the Lanzhou Military Region; 2000–2002	Succeeded by Liu Yongzhi
Preceded by Zhang Wentai	Political Commissar of the Jinan Military Region; 2002–2010	Succeeded by Du Hengyan
