= Houji, Zhenping County =

Houji 侯集镇
- Town
- Location in Henan
- Coordinates: 32°56′27″N 112°12′34″E
- Country: People's Republic of China
- Province: Henan
- Prefectural city: Nanyang
- County: Zhenping County
- Time zone: UTC+8 (China Standard)

Houji (Chinese: 侯集; pinyin: Hóují) is a town under the administration of Zhenping County, Henan, China. As of 2023, it administers the following 28 villages:

- Dongmen Village (东门村)
- Ximen Village (西门村)
- Nanmen Village (南门村)
- Beimen Village (北门村)
- Dizhuang Village (狄庄村)
- Gaoying Village (高营村)
- Songxiaozhuang Village (宋小庄村)
- Nanwa Village (南洼村)
- Jianglaozhuang Village (姜老庄村)
- Xiangzhai Village (向寨村)
- Xinzhuangzhai Village (辛庄寨村)
- Tianzhai Village (田寨村)
- Songzhuang Village (宋庄村)
- Liuying Village (刘营村)
- Majuanwang Village (马圈王村)
- Jiangying Village (姜营村)
- Yongfengzhuang Village (永丰庄村)
- Qiaoqiying Village (乔其营村)
- Tanzhai Village (谭寨村)
- Yuanying Village (袁营村)
- Dazhaoying Village (大赵营村)
- Changying Village (常营村)
- Xiangdian Village (项店村)
- Wangguanying Village (王官营村)
- Fangying Village (房营村)
- Houzhai Village (侯寨村)
- Songying Village (宋营村)
- Yiying Village (易营村)
