= Peng Xiaofeng =

Chinese general

Peng Xiaofeng (Chinese: 彭小枫; born February 1945) is a retired general of the Chinese People's Liberation Army (PLA) who served as political commissar of the PLA Second Artillery Corps.

== Early life ==
Peng is from Zhenping County, Henan Province. Peng is the son of Peng Xuefeng, a renowned general during the Second Sino-Japanese War and the head of the 4th division of the New Fourth Army.

== Career ==
Peng entered the PLA Institute of Military Engineering in Harbin in September 1963, and joined the Chinese Communist Party (CCP) in December 1965. Peng joined the PLA in August 1968.

Peng formerly served in the 40th Group Army as director of the political department, vice political commissar and political commissar. In August 2001, Peng became the vice political commissar of the Lanzhou Military Region. In January 2002, Peng was appointed to be the vice political commissar and discipline department secretary of PLA National Defense University. Peng was promoted to political commissar of the Second Artillery Corps in December 2003. Peng retired from the army in 2009 and served in the National People's Congress.

Peng attained the rank of major general in 1997, lieutenant general in 2001, and full general on June 24, 2006.

Peng was a member of the 17th Central Committee of the Chinese Communist Party.
