= Houji, Wuyang County =

Houji 侯集镇
- Town
- Location in Henan
- Coordinates: 33°40′14″N 113°42′23″E
- Country: People's Republic of China
- Province: Henan
- Prefectural city: Luohe
- County: Wuyang County
- Time zone: UTC+8 (China Standard)

Houji (Chinese: 侯集; pinyin: Hóují) is a town under the administration of Wuyang County, Henan, China. As of 2023, it administers the following 34 villages:

- Houji Village
- Qinzhuang Village (秦庄村)
- Xianwang Village (显王村)
- Xixiaozhang Village (西小张村)
- Nianzhang Village (碾张村)
- Sunzhuang Village (孙庄村)
- Jinzhuanliu Village (金砖刘村)
- Huli Village (湖李村)
- Chenzhuang Village (陈庄村)
- Youfangtou Village (油坊头村)
- Mazhuang Village (马庄村)
- Shiyang Village (柿杨村)
- Zhaili Village (寨李村)
- Donglianhua Village (东莲花村)
- Luguo Village (芦郭村)
- Gaosi Village (高寺村)
- Dahuang Village (大黄村)
- Liziyuan Village (栗子园村)
- Yuzhuang Village (余庄村)
- Yanliu Village (闫刘村)
- Tangzhuang Village (汤庄村)
- Duangongliu Village (端公刘村)
- Xiaopeicheng Village (小裴城村)
- Dongxiaozhang Village (东小张村)
- Suzhuang Village (苏庄村)
- Xianguo Village (线郭村)
- Dagang Village (大岗村)
- Kangzhuang Village (康庄村)
- Wangxiaogui Village (王小贵村)
- Jingzhuang Village (井庄村)
- Xilianhua Village (西莲花村)
- Hebeijie Village (河北街村)
- Dazhang Village (大张村)
- Houwang Village (候王村)
