= Yu Linxiang =

- 喻林祥

Political Commissar of the People's Armed Police
- In office September 2007 – July 2010
- Preceded by: Sui Mingtai
- Succeeded by: Xu Yaoyuan

Political Commissar of the Lanzhou Military Region
- In office December 2004 – September 2007
- Preceded by: Liu Yongzhi
- Succeeded by: Li Changcai

Personal details
- Born: January 1945 (age 81) Yingcheng County, Hubei, China
- Party: Chinese Communist Party

Military service
- Allegiance: People's Republic of China
- Branch/service: People's Liberation Army Ground Force; People's Armed Police
- Years of service: 1963–2010
- Rank: General

Yu Linxiang (Chinese: 喻林祥; pinyin: Yù Línxiáng; born January 1945) is a retired general (shangjiang) who served as political commissar of the People's Armed Police of China.

== Biography ==
Yu was born in January 1945 in Yingcheng, Hubei, and joined the Chinese Communist Party in April 1966. Yu attained the rank of general on June 24, 2006. He has served in a number of roles since joining the Party. Yu was first appointed to be the deputy director of the 1st Army, and then the political commissar of the 2nd legion. He has held simultaneous posts as the political commissar of the first division of the Beijing city PAP and the deputy director of the political bureau of the PAP. He next served as the head of the Ministry of Organization under the divisional People's Liberation Army political ministry. Yu then took up the posts of assistant head of the Lanzhou Military Region and the political commissar of the Xinjiang Military District under the Lanzhou MR. He was promoted to political commissar of the Lanzhou MR in December 2004. In September 2007, Yu assumed became political commissar of the People's Armed Police. He was also a member of the 17th Central Committee of the Chinese Communist Party.

Military offices
Preceded by Zhou Yongshun	Political Commissar of the Xinjiang Military District; 2000–2004	Succeeded by Tian Xiusi
Preceded by Liu Yongzhi	Political Commissar of the Lanzhou Military Region; 2004–2007	Succeeded by Li Changcai
Preceded by Sui Mingtai	Political Commissar of the People's Armed Police; 2007–2010	Succeeded by Xu Yaoyuan
