= Yang Huaiqing =

Chinese military personnel (1939–2012)

- 杨怀庆

Political Commissar of the People's Liberation Army Navy
- In office July 1995 – June 2003
- Preceded by: Zhou Kunren
- Succeeded by: Hu Yanlin

Personal details
- Born: February 1939 Shouguang County, Shandong, China
- Died: 12 December 2012 (aged 73) Beijing, China
- Party: Chinese Communist Party
- Education: PLA National Defence University; Central Party School of the Chinese Communist Party

Military service
- Allegiance: People's Republic of China
- Branch/service: People's Liberation Army Navy
- Years of service: 1958–2003
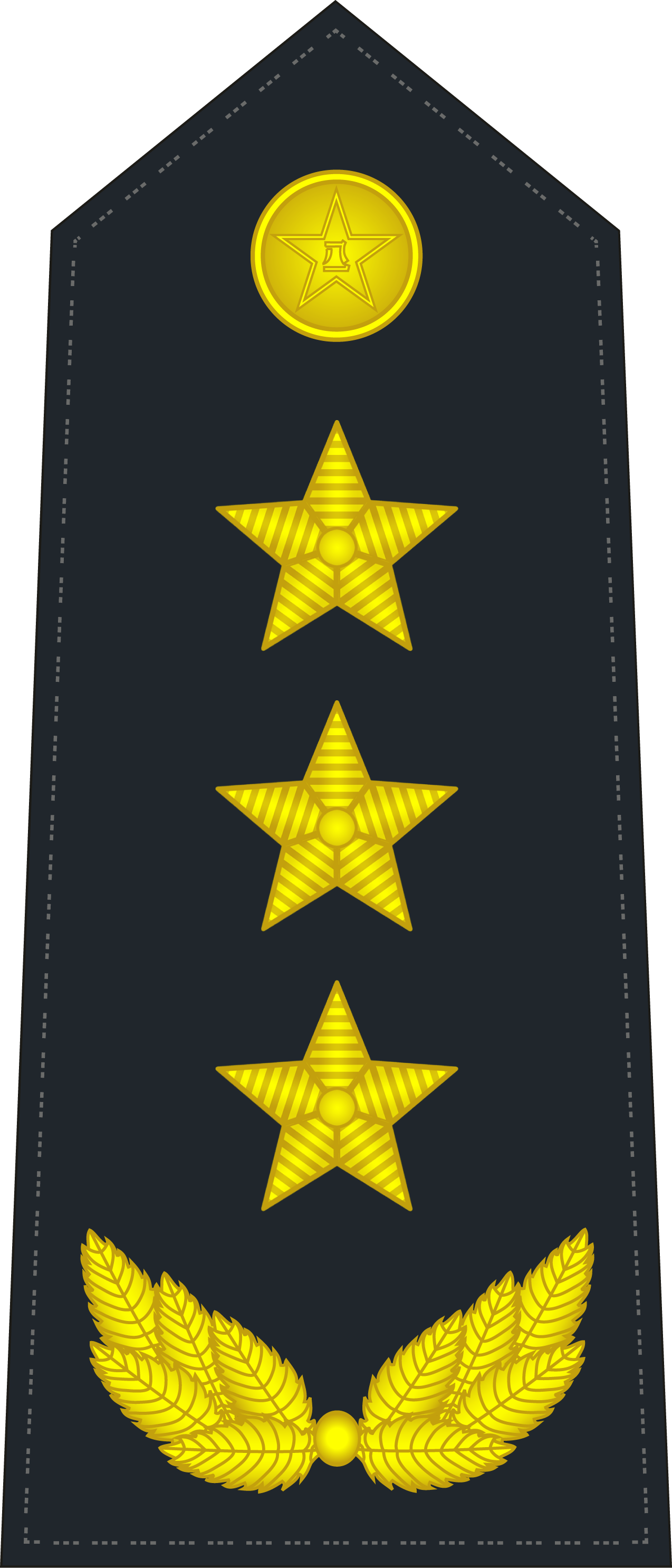
- Rank: Admiral

Chinese name
- Simplified Chinese: 杨怀庆
- Traditional Chinese: 楊懷慶
Transcriptions
Standard Mandarin
- Hanyu Pinyin: Yáng Huáiqìng

Yang Huaiqing (Chinese: 杨怀庆; February 1939 – 12 December 2012) was an admiral in the People's Liberation Army Navy (PLA Navy) of China. He was a member of the 15th and 16th Central Committees of the Chinese Communist Party. He was a delegate to the 8th National People's Congress.

== Biography ==
Yang was born in Shouguang County (now Shouguang), Shandong, in February 1939. He enlisted in the People's Liberation Army (PLA) in January 1958, and joined the Chinese Communist Party (CCP) in May 1960. He was assigned to the East Sea Fleet in August 1970. He moved up the ranks to become deputy head of Cadre Division of the Political Department in September 1981 and head in June 1983. He became director of the Political Department of the Zhoushan Naval Base in August 1985, and two years later entered the Central Party School of the Chinese Communist Party. In January 1988, he became deputy political commissar of the Zhoushan Naval Base, rising to political commissar six months later. He served as deputy director of the PLA Navy Political Department in June 1990, and two years later promoted to the director position. He was promoted to deputy political commissar of the PLA Navy in December 1993. In July 1995, he was promoted again to become political commissar. He was removed from public office and forced into retirement alongside Shi Yunsheng in May 2003 due to the military disaster of Chinese submarine 361. He died of an illness in Beijing, at the age of 73.

He attained the rank of rear admiral (shaojiang) in July 1990, vice admiral (zhongjiang) in July 1994, and admiral (shangjiang) in June 2000.

Military offices
Preceded by Zhou Kunren	Political Commissar of the People's Liberation Army Navy; 1995–2003	Succeeded by Hu Yanlin
