= Liu Yongzhi =

Chinese general

- 刘永治

Political Commissar of the Lanzhou Military Region
- In office 2002 – December 2004
- Preceded by: Liu Dongdong
- Succeeded by: Yu Linxiang

Personal details
- Born: November 1944 (age 81) Yanling County, Henan, China
- Party: Chinese Communist Party
- Education: Central Party School of the Chinese Communist Party

Military service
- Allegiance: People's Republic of China
- Branch/service: People's Liberation Army Ground Force
- Years of service: 1960–2009
- Rank: General

Chinese name
- Simplified Chinese: 刘永治
- Traditional Chinese: 劉永治
Transcriptions
Standard Mandarin
- Hanyu Pinyin: Liú Yǒngzhì

Liu Yongzhi (Chinese: 刘永治; born November 1944) is a general in the People's Liberation Army (PLA) of the People's Republic of China. He served as vice director of the PLA General Political Department.

== Biography ==
Born in Yanling County, Henan Province, Liu joined the Chinese Communist Party (CCP) in November 1963.

In April 1999, he was appointed to be the director of the political department and a standing committee member of the CCP committee of the Nanjing Military Region. In December 2000, he became the vice political commissar of the Region. In October 2002, he was transferred to the Lanzhou Military Region and promoted to political commissar and secretary of the CCP committee there. Since December 2004, he has served as vice director of the PLA General Political Department and as a member of its CCP committee.

Liu attained the rank of major general in June 1991, lieutenant general in July 2000, and general on June 24, 2006. He was a member of the 16th and 17th Central Committee of the Chinese Communist Party.

Military offices
Preceded by Li Jisong	Director of the Political Department of the Nanjing Military Region; 1999–2000	Succeeded by Pan Ruiji
Preceded by Liu Dongdong	Political Commissar of the Lanzhou Military Region; 2002–2004	Succeeded by Yu Linxiang
