= Zhou Kunren =

Chinese naval admiral

- 周坤仁

Political Commissar of the People's Liberation Army General Logistics Department
- In office July 1995 – October 2002
- Preceded by: Zhou Keyu
- Succeeded by: Zhang Wentai

Political Commissar of the People's Liberation Army Navy
- In office December 1993 – July 1995
- Preceded by: Wei Jinshan
- Succeeded by: Yang Huaiqing

Personal details
- Born: 10 September 1937 (age 89) Danyang County, Jiangsu, China
- Party: Chinese Communist Party
- Education: PLA National Defence University; Central Party School of the Chinese Communist Party

Military service
- Allegiance: People's Republic of China
- Branch/service: People's Liberation Army Navy
- Years of service: 1956–2002
- Rank: Admiral

Zhou Kunren (Chinese: 周坤仁; pinyin: Zhōu Kūnrén; born 10 September 1937) is an admiral in the People's Liberation Army Navy of China who served as political commissar of the South Sea Fleet from 1990 to 1993, political commissar of the People's Liberation Army Navy from 1993 to 1995, and political commissar of the People's Liberation Army General Logistics Department from 1995 to 2002.

He was a delegate to the 7th and 9th National People's Congress and a member of the Standing Committee of the 10th National People's Congress. He was a representative of the 15th and 16th National Congress of the Chinese Communist Party. He was a member of the 15th Central Committee of the Chinese Communist Party.

== Biography ==
Zhou was born in Danyang County (now Danyang), Jiangsu, on 10 September 1937. He enlisted in the People's Liberation Army (PLA) in January 1956, and joined the Chinese Communist Party (CCP) in May 1960. He served in the East Sea Fleet from 1956 to 1986. In January 1987, he was promoted to become deputy director of the Political Department of the People's Liberation Army Navy, a position he held until 1990. He was appointed political commissar of the South Sea Fleet in June 1990, concurrently serving as deputy political commissar of the People's Liberation Army Navy since November 1992. And one year later, he rose to become political commissar. He became political commissar of the People's Liberation Army General Logistics Department in July 1995, serving in the post until his retirement in October 2002. In March 2003, he took office as vice chairperson of the National People's Congress Constitution and Law Committee.

He was promoted to the rank of rear admiral (shaojiang) in September 1988, vice admiral (zhongjiang) in July 1993, and admiral (shangjiang) in June 2000.

Military offices
Preceded by Zhang Haiyun	Political Commissar of the South Sea Fleet; 1990–1993	Succeeded by Kang Fuquan
Preceded by Wei Jinshan	Political Commissar of the People's Liberation Army Navy; 1993–1995	Succeeded by Yang Huaiqing
Preceded by Zhou Keyu	Political Commissar of the People's Liberation Army General Logistics Department; 1995–2002	Succeeded by Zhang Wentai
