= Du Hengyan =

Chinese general

- 杜恒岩

Political Commissar of the Jinan Military Region
- In office July 2010 – January 2016
- Preceded by: Liu Dongdong
- Succeeded by: Position revoked

Political Commissar of the 65th Group Army
- In office June 2000 – December 2005
- Preceded by: Zhang Qiuxiang
- Succeeded by: Gao Donglu

Personal details
- Born: 1951 (age 74–75) Longkou, Shandong, China
- Party: Chinese Communist Party
- Education: PLA National Defence University; National University of Defense Technology; Central Party School of the Chinese Communist Party

Military service
- Allegiance: China
- Branch/service: People's Liberation Army Ground Force
- Years of service: 1969–2017
- Rank: General

Chinese name
- Simplified Chinese: 杜恒岩
- Traditional Chinese: 杜恆岩
Transcriptions
Standard Mandarin
- Hanyu Pinyin: Du Hengyan

Du Hengyan (Chinese: 杜恒岩; pinyin: Dù Héngyán; born July 1951) is a retired general (shangjiang) in the Chinese People's Liberation Army. He served as deputy director of the Political Work Department of the Central Military Commission.

== Biography ==
Du joined the PLA as a serviceman in 1969, and joined the Chinese Communist Party a year later. Wei served in the Shenyang Military Region, then the Beijing Military Region. In 1996 he became the deputy political commissar of the 28th Group Army. In 1998 he was awarded the rank of major general. In 2000 he became political commissar of the 65th Group Army. In 2005 he became head of discipline and deputy political commissar of the Jinan Military Region. In 2007 he was promoted to lieutenant general. In 2010 he became political commissar of the Jinan Military Region. He attained the rank of General in July 2012, also he was made deputy director of the Political Work Department in the same year. He was a member of the 17th Central Commission for Discipline Inspection and a member of the 18th Central Committee of the Chinese Communist Party.

Military offices
Preceded by Zhang Qiuxiang	Political Commissar of the 65th Group Army; 2000–2005	Succeeded by Gao Donglu
Preceded by Liu Dongdong	Political Commissar of the Jinan Military Region; 2010–2016	Succeeded by Position revoked
