= Hou Shusen =

Retired general in the People's Liberation Army of China

- 侯树森

Chief of Staff of the Shenyang Military Region
- In office December 2005 – June 2009
- Preceded by: Li Shiming
- Succeeded by: Hou Jizhen

Personal details
- Born: June 1950 (age 76) Fuxin Mongol Autonomous County, Liaoning, China
- Party: Chinese Communist Party
- Education: Jilin University

Military service
- Allegiance: People's Republic of China
- Branch/service: People's Liberation Army Ground Force
- Years of service: ?–2014
- Rank: General

Chinese name
- Simplified Chinese: 侯树森
- Traditional Chinese: 侯樹森
Transcriptions
Standard Mandarin
- Hanyu Pinyin: Hóu Shùsēn

Hou Shusen (Chinese: 侯树森; born June 1950) is a retired general in the People's Liberation Army of China. He was a member of the 12th National Committee of the Chinese People's Political Consultative Conference. He was a representative of the 17th National Congress of the Chinese Communist Party.

== Biography ==
Hou was born in Fuxin Mongol Autonomous County, Liaoning, in June 1950. He served in the Shenyang Military Region since joining the People's Liberation Army (PLA), and eventually becoming its chief of staff in December 2005. He also served as a secretary for Commander Wang Ke between 1992 and 1995. In July 2009, he succeeded Liu Zhenwu as deputy chief of the People's Liberation Army General Staff Department, serving in the post until his retirement in November 2014. In March 2015, he took office as vice chairperson of the Liaison with Hong Kong, Macao, Taiwan and Overseas Chinese Committee of the Chinese People's Political Consultative Conference.

He was promoted to the rank of major general (shaojiang) in 1999, lieutenant general (zhongjiang) in July 2007, and general (shangjiang) in July 2011.

Military offices
Preceded by Li Shiming	Chief of Staff of the Shenyang Military Region; 2005–2009	Succeeded by Hou Jizhen
