= Liu Yuan (PRC general) =

General of the People's Liberation Army, son of former President Liu Shaoqi

- 刘源

Political Commissar of the General Logistics Department
- In office December 2010 – December 2015
- Preceded by: Sun Dafa
- Succeeded by: Office abolished

Political Commissar of the PLA Academy of Military Science
- In office December 2005 – December 2010
- Preceded by: Wen Zongren
- Succeeded by: Sun Sijing

Personal details
- Born: 22 February 1951 (age 75) Beijing, China
- Party: Chinese Communist Party
- Parent(s): Liu Shaoqi; Wang Guangmei
- Education: Capital Normal University

Military service
- Allegiance: People's Republic of China
- Branch/service: People's Liberation Army Ground Force
- Years of service: 1992–2015
- Rank: General

Chinese name
- Simplified Chinese: 刘源
- Traditional Chinese: 劉源
Transcriptions
Standard Mandarin
- Hanyu Pinyin: Liú Yuán

Liu Yuan (Chinese: 刘源; born 22 February 1951) is a retired general of the Chinese People's Liberation Army and a former politician. He served as the last political commissar of the PLA General Logistics Department and prior to that, political commissar of the PLA Academy of Military Science. Before his military career, he served as vice mayor of Zhengzhou and vice governor of Henan. He is the son of Liu Shaoqi, former president of China.

== Life and career ==
Liu Yuan was born in 1951 in Beijing, the son of Liu Shaoqi, a Chinese Communist Party (CCP) revolutionary and former president of China, and Wang Guangmei, a multilingual interpreter who also worked for the CCP. He graduated from the No. 2 Experimental School in Beijing in 1964, and entered a regiment on the Central Security Bureau to undergo military training during his summer vacation.

In 1966, Mao Zedong launched the Cultural Revolution, and targeted Liu Shaoqi through the euphemistic "Bombard the Headquarters" big-character poster that Mao penned himself and ordered circulated all over the country. Liu Yuan, perhaps not initially realizing the real target of the poster was his own father, answered Mao's call-to-arms to usher in a brave new world by joining a Red Guard regiment at Beijing No. 4 High School. In September 1967, after his father had been forcibly removed from the capital, Liu Yuan and his two sisters escaped the Zhongnanhai compound by themselves but were left homeless. They found temporary shelter at the No. 4 Middle School.

Liu Shaoqi fell into political disgrace and was later killed during the Cultural Revolution. However, he was later rehabilitated after the Cultural Revolution ended. Liu Yuan was therefore allowed to participate in politics again.

In 1985, Liu Yuan became the vice mayor of Zhengzhou, capital of Henan. He was promoted to vice governor of Henan in 1988. Since 1992, he had served in People's Armed Police for years. In 2003, he became a deputy political commissar of the PLA General Logistics Department, and was made lieutenant general. He was appointed as political commissar of the PLA Academy of Military Science in 2005. On 20 July 2009, Liu was promoted to general.

In 2010, Liu wrote the preface to a friend's book titled Changing Our View of Culture and History, which has aroused notice for criticizing recent Party leadership and calls for the rejection of foreign models and a return to a supposed upright military heritage.

Wall Street Journalists believe Liu is politically close to other "princelings", especially Xi Jinping, the General Secretary of the Chinese Communist Party. Xi Jinping was said to be moving to promote Liu to the Central Military Commission after 'accusations (by Liu) in 2012 paved the way for the corruption charges against' senior military offices General Xu Caihou and lieutenant general Gu Junshan, as part of his plan to tackle corruption. Despite media speculation that he would take on the post of the Central Military Commission's new Discipline Inspection Commission, Liu Yuan retired in December 2015. Regarding his retirement, Liu said, "I will be the last political commissar of the Logistics Department... I will absolutely obey the military reforms [of Xi Jinping]."

In 2016, Liu was named deputy chair of the Financial and Economic Affairs Committee of the National People's Congress.

Liu was a member of the 17th and the 18th Central Committees of the Chinese Communist Party.

Military offices
Preceded by Wen Zongren	Political commissar of the PLA Academy of Military Science; 2005–2010	Succeeded by Sun Sijing
Preceded by Sun Dafa	Political Commissar of the PLA General Logistics Department; 2010–2015	Office abolished
