= Xu Yongqing =

- 徐永清

Political Commissar of the People's Armed Police
- In office February 1992 – December 2003
- Preceded by: Zhang Shutian
- Succeeded by: Sui Mingtai

Personal details
- Born: August 1938 (age 87) Jiande County, Zhejiang, China
- Party: Chinese Communist Party
- Education: PLA National Defence University

Military service
- Allegiance: People's Republic of China
- Branch/service: People's Liberation Army Ground Force (1956–1996); People's Armed Police (1996–2003)
- Years of service: 1956–2003
- Rank: General
- Battles/wars: Sino-Vietnamese War

Xu Yongqing (Chinese: 徐永清; pinyin: Xú Yǒngqīng; born August 1938) is a general in the People's Liberation Army of China who served as political commissar of the People's Armed Police from 1996 to 2003.

He was a representative of the 14th National Congress of the Chinese Communist Party and a member of the 15th Central Committee of the Chinese Communist Party. He was a member of the Standing Committee of the 10th National People's Congress

== Biography ==
Xu was born in Jiande County (now Jiande), Zhejiang, in August 1938. He enlisted in the People's Liberation Army (PLA) in December 1956, and joined the Chinese Communist Party (CCP) in the same month. From 1956 to 1996, he served in the People's Liberation Army Ground Force, what he was political commissar of the in August 1988 and deputy political commissar of the Lanzhou Military Region in December 1994. In 1985, he was soon commissioned as political commissar of the 27th Group Army, participating the Sino-Vietnamese War. In February 1996, he was promoted to become political commissar of the People's Armed Police, serving in the post until his retirement in December 2003.

He was promoted to the rank of major general (shaojiang) in September 1988, lieutenant general (zhongjiang) in July 1995, and general (shangjiang) in June 2000.

Military offices
New title	Political Commissar of the 27th Group Army; 1985–1988	Succeeded by Zhu Zengquan
Preceded by Liu Xinzeng	Political Commissar of the Zhejiang Military District; 1988–1995	Succeeded by He Jiabi
Preceded by Zhang Shutian	Political Commissar of the People's Armed Police; 1992–2003	Succeeded by Sui Mingtai
