= Sun Dafa =

Chinese general (1945–2019)

- 孙大发

Political Commissar of the People's Liberation Army General Logistics Department
- In office July 2005 – December 2010
- Preceded by: Zhang Wentai
- Succeeded by: Liu Yuan

Personal details
- Born: November 1945 Jinzhai County, Anhui, China
- Died: 26 September 2019 (aged 73) Beijing, China
- Party: Chinese Communist Party
- Education: PLA National Defence University

Military service
- Allegiance: Chinese Communist Party
- Branch/service: People's Liberation Army Ground Force
- Years of service: 1964–2011
- Rank: General

Chinese name
- Simplified Chinese: 孙大发
- Traditional Chinese: 孫大發
Transcriptions
Standard Mandarin
- Hanyu Pinyin: Sūn Dàfā

Sun Dafa (Chinese: 孙大发; November 1945 – 26 September 2019) was a general of the People's Liberation Army (PLA) who served as Political Commissar of the PLA General Logistics Department.

== Biography ==
Sun was born in November 1945 in Jinzhai, Anhui, Republic of China. He enlisted in the People's Liberation Army in 1964 and joined the Chinese Communist Party in 1968.

After 1977, he served as the secretary of Li Desheng, then the commander of the Shenyang Military Region. In May 1984, he was appointed Political Commissar of the 115th Division of the 39th Group Army. In June 1990, he was promoted to Director of the Political Department of the 16th Group Army, and attained the rank of major general. He was later promoted to political commissar of the 16th Army.

In January 1999, Sun became Director of the Political Department of the Shenyang Military Region, and attained the rank of lieutenant general in 2000. He was transferred to the Nanjing Military Region in August 2003 and became Director of the Political Department there. In January 2005, he became vice political commissar and secretary of discipline commission of the Nanjing Military Region. From 2005, he served as Political Commissar of the PLA General Logistics Department. He was made a full general in June 2007.

Sun was a member of the 17th Central Committee of the Chinese Communist Party. He graduated from PLA National Defense University and has authored some military books, for example High-Tech War Strategy (高技术战争谋略).

Sun died in Beijing on 26 September 2019, aged 73.

Military offices
Preceded by Pan Ruiji	Director of the Political Department of the Nanjing Military Region; 2003–2004	Succeeded by Gao Wusheng
Preceded by Li Jisong	Secretary of the Discipline Inspection Commission of the Nanjing Military Region; 2004–2005	Succeeded by Gao Wusheng
Preceded by Zhang Wentai	Political Commissar of the PLA General Logistics Department; 2005 – 2010	Succeeded by Liu Yuan
