= Wen Zongren =

Chinese politician

- 温宗仁

Political Commissar of the Academy of Military Sciences
- In office June 2000 – December 2005
- Preceded by: Zhang Gong
- Succeeded by: Liu Yuan

Political Commissar of the Lanzhou Military Region
- In office January 1996 – June 2000
- Preceded by: Cao Pengsheng
- Succeeded by: Liu Dongdong

Personal details
- Born: November 1940 Chao County, Anhui, China
- Died: 13 March 2008 (aged 67) Beijing, China
- Party: Chinese Communist Party
- Education: PLA Tank School; PLA Military Academy

Military service
- Allegiance: People's Republic of China
- Branch/service: People's Liberation Army Ground Force
- Years of service: 1959–2005
- Rank: General

Chinese name
- Simplified Chinese: 温宗仁
- Traditional Chinese: 溫宗仁
Transcriptions
Standard Mandarin
- Hanyu Pinyin: Wēn Zōngrén

Wen Zongren (Chinese: 温宗仁; pinyin: Wēn Zōngrén; November 1940 – 13 March 2008) was a general in the People's Liberation Army of China who served as political commissar of the Academy of Military Sciences from 2000 to 2005, and political commissar of the Lanzhou Military Region from 1996 to 2000. He was an alternate member of the 14th Central Committee of the Chinese Communist Party and a member of the 15th and 16th Central Committee of the Chinese Communist Party. He was a delegate to the 7th National People's Congress and a member of the 11th National Committee of the Chinese People's Political Consultative Conference.

== Biography ==
Wen was born in the town of Zhonghan, Chao County (now Chaohu), Anhui, in November 1940.

He enlisted in the People's Liberation Army (PLA) in February 1959, and joined the Chinese Communist Party (CCP) in April 1961. He graduated from the PLA Tank School and PLA Military Academy. He served in the Nanjing Military Region for a long time. In August 1985, he became deputy party secretary of the 12th Group Army, rising to party secretary in June 1990. He also served as political commissar from August 1985 to October 1994. In October 1994, he was appointed director of the Political Department of the Nanjing Military Region, he remained in that position until January 1996, when he was transferred to Lanzhou Military Region and appointed political commissar and party secretary. He became political commissar and party secretary of the Academy of Military Sciences in June 2000, and served until December 2005.

On 13 March 2008, he died from an illness in Beijing, at the age of 67.

He was promoted to the rank of major general (shaojiang) in September 1988, lieutenant general (zhongjiang) in January 1996, and general (shangjiang) in June 2002.

Military offices
Preceded by Cao Pengsheng	Political Commissar of the Lanzhou Military Region; 1996–2000	Succeeded by Liu Dongdong
Preceded by Zhang Gong	Political Commissar of the Academy of Military Sciences; 2000–2005	Succeeded by Liu Yuan
