= Houji, Shandong =

Houji 侯集镇
- Town
- Location in Shandong
- Coordinates: 34°49′27″N 115°43′41″E
- Country: People's Republic of China
- Province: Shandong
- Prefecture-level city: Heze
- County: Cao County
- Time zone: UTC+8 (China Standard)

Houji (Chinese: 侯集; pinyin: Hóují) is a town under the administration of Cao County, Shandong, China. As of 2023, it administers the following 20 villages:

- Houji Village
- Dongzhanglou Village (东张楼村)
- Zhizhuang Village (智庄村)
- Beishalou Village (北沙楼村)
- Wanghualou Village (王花楼村)
- Ranlou Village (冉楼村)
- Xizhaozhuang Village (西赵庄村)
- Huilou Village (回楼村)
- Gaohuangzhuang Village (郜黄庄村)
- Zhangshuangmiao Village (张双庙村)
- Xingmiao Village (邢庙村)
- Xizhanglou Village (西张楼村)
- Xishalou Village (西沙楼村)
- Mengzhuang Village (孟庄村)
- Hexie Village (和谐村)
- Fengwu Village (凤舞村)
- Lishuangmiao Village (李双庙村)
- Dongzhaozhuang Village (东赵庄村)
- Sanlian Village (三联村)
- Hulou Village (胡楼村)
