= Peng Xuefeng =

Chinese general (1907–1944)

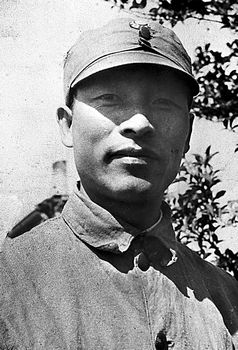

Peng Xuefeng (Chinese: 彭雪枫) (September 9, 1907 – September 11, 1944) was a New Fourth Army general officer during the Second Sino-Japanese War.

== Early life ==
Peng was born in Henan in 1907. He was not related to Marshal Peng Dehuai. He was trained at a military school in Beijing and joined the Chinese Communist Party in 1927. He spent some time as a political commissar.

== Personal life ==
Peng died in 1944. He was killed in action in Xiayi County, Henan 5 months before the birth of his son. Peng was 37 years old. Peng's son is Peng Xiaofeng, a retired general in the People's Liberation Army.

== Chinese Civil War ==
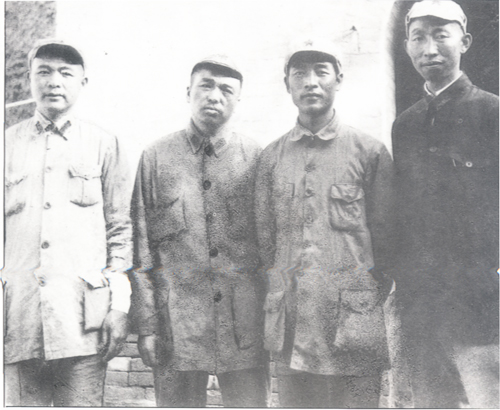
1936, Xu Haidong, Peng Dehuai, Peng Xuefeng, 郭述申 in northern Shaanxi

== War of Resistance against Japan ==
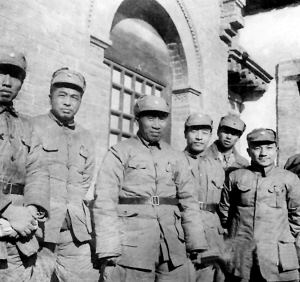
1938, ShanxiHongdong County马牧村Eighth Route Army总部合影, 自左起分别为Zuo Quan, Peng Dehuai, Zhu De, Peng Xuefeng, Xiao Ke, Deng Xiaoping

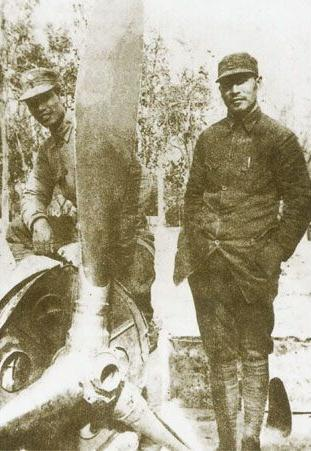
1940年, Peng Xuefeng and Zhang Zhen在板桥集战斗中被击落的日军飞机残骸前留影

Following the establishment of the Second United Front, Peng, as Director of the Eighth Route Army's Taiyuan Office and a representative of the Eighth Route Army Headquarters to the joint meeting of chiefs of staff and directors of political departments at the division level and above, convened in Wuhan by the Kuomintang Military Affairs Commission during the Spring of 1938, he was given the rank of Major General.
