= Zhenping County, Henan =

County in southwest Henan Province, China

Coordinates: 33°02′02″N 112°14′02″E

Zhenping County 镇平县 Chenping
- County
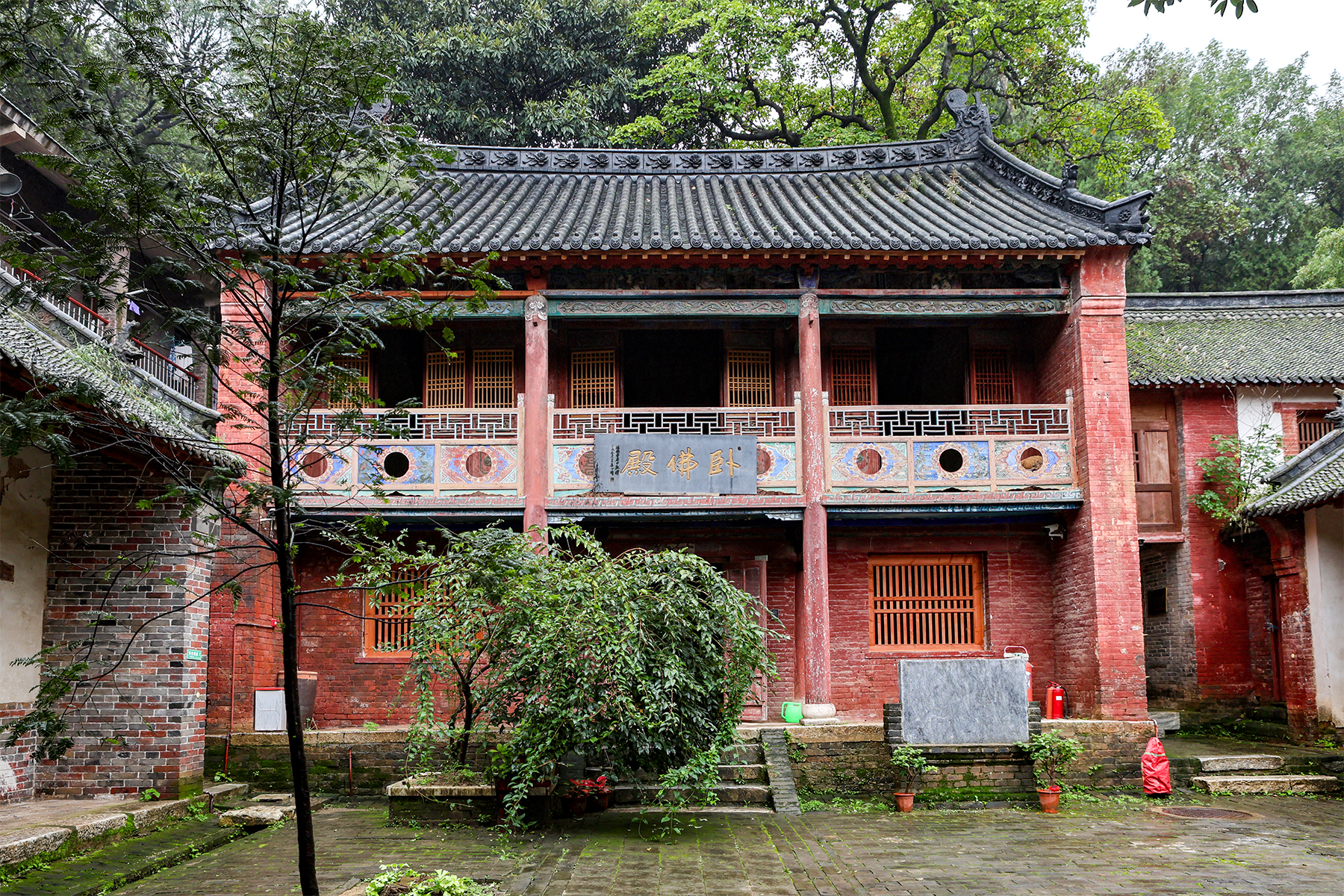
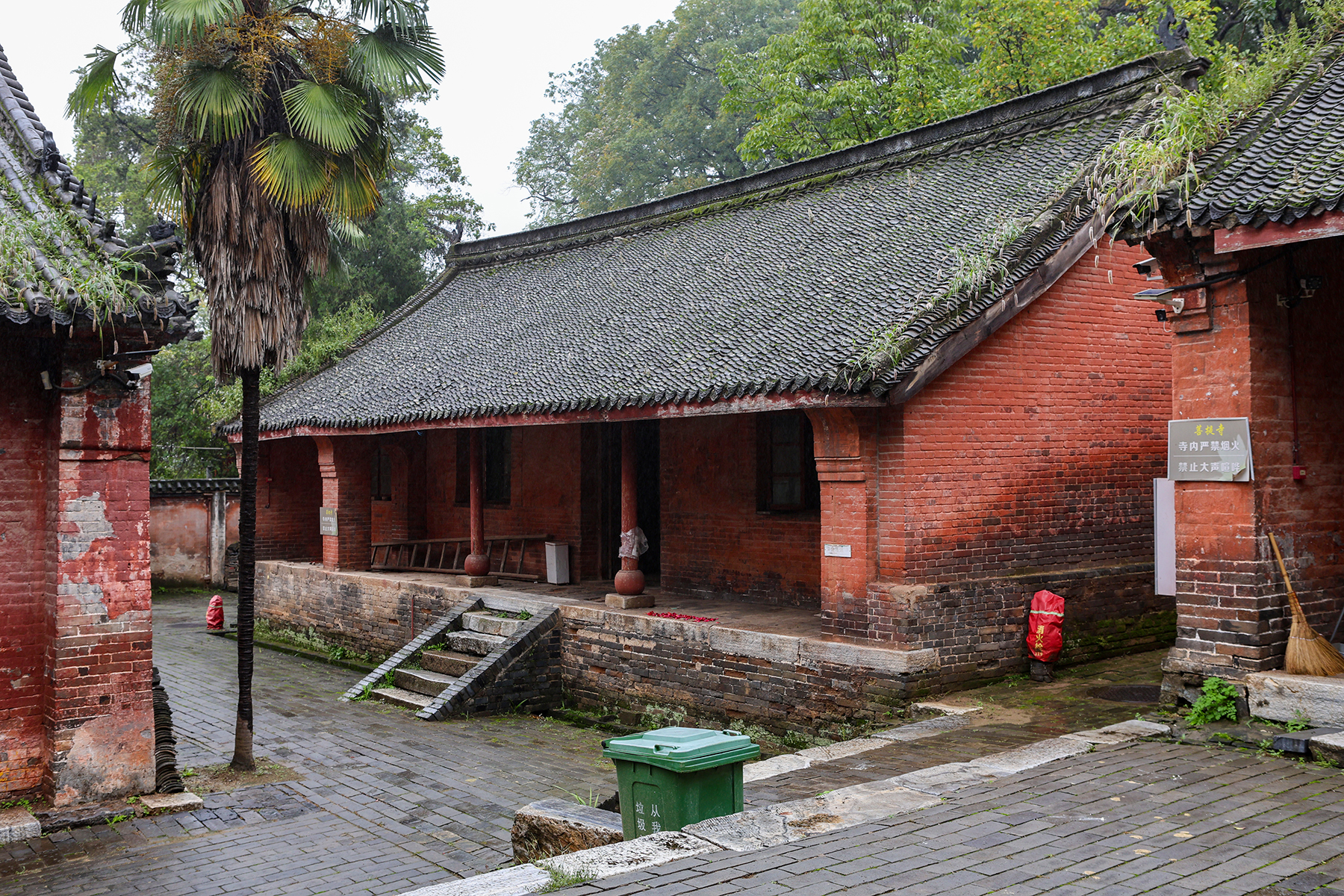
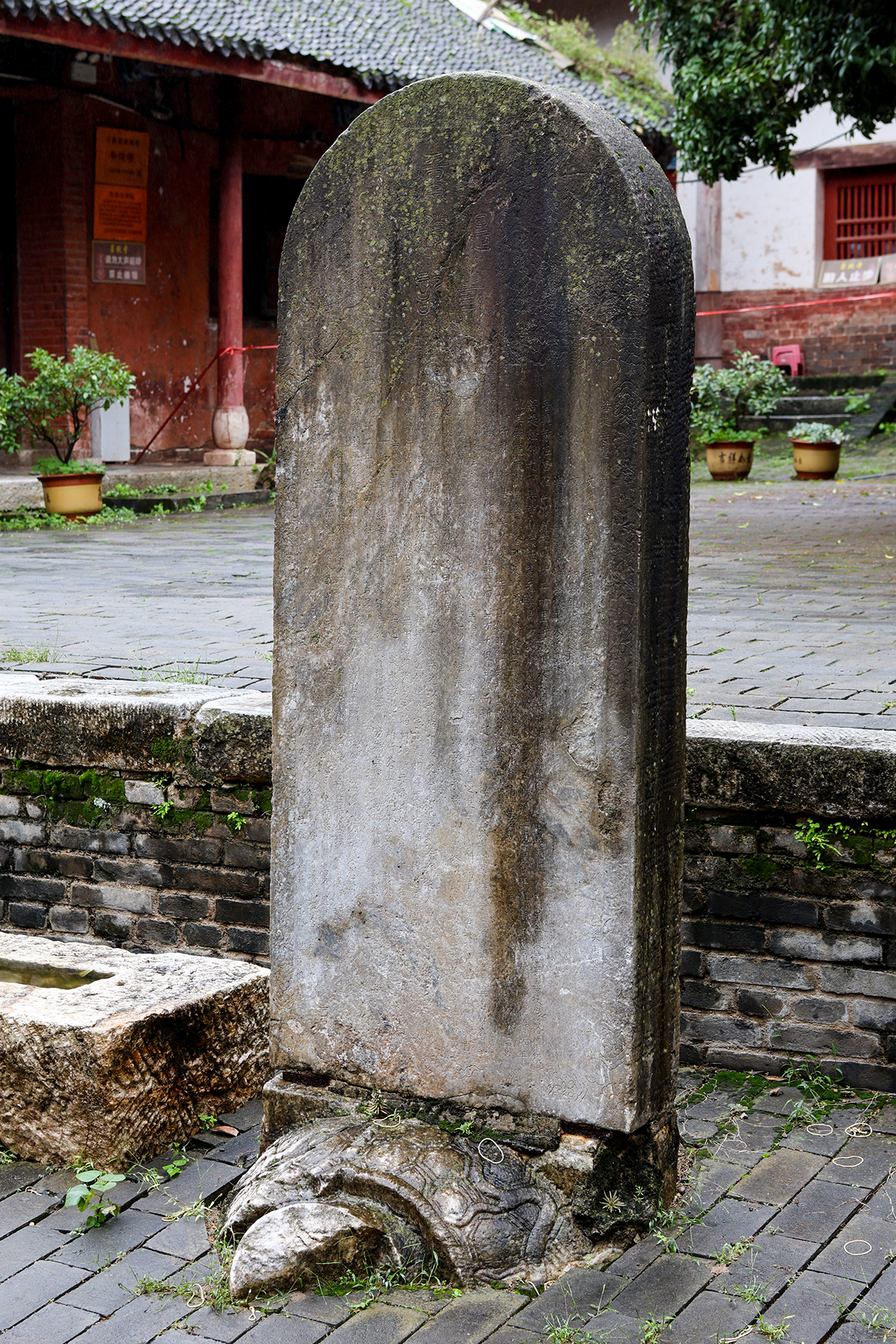
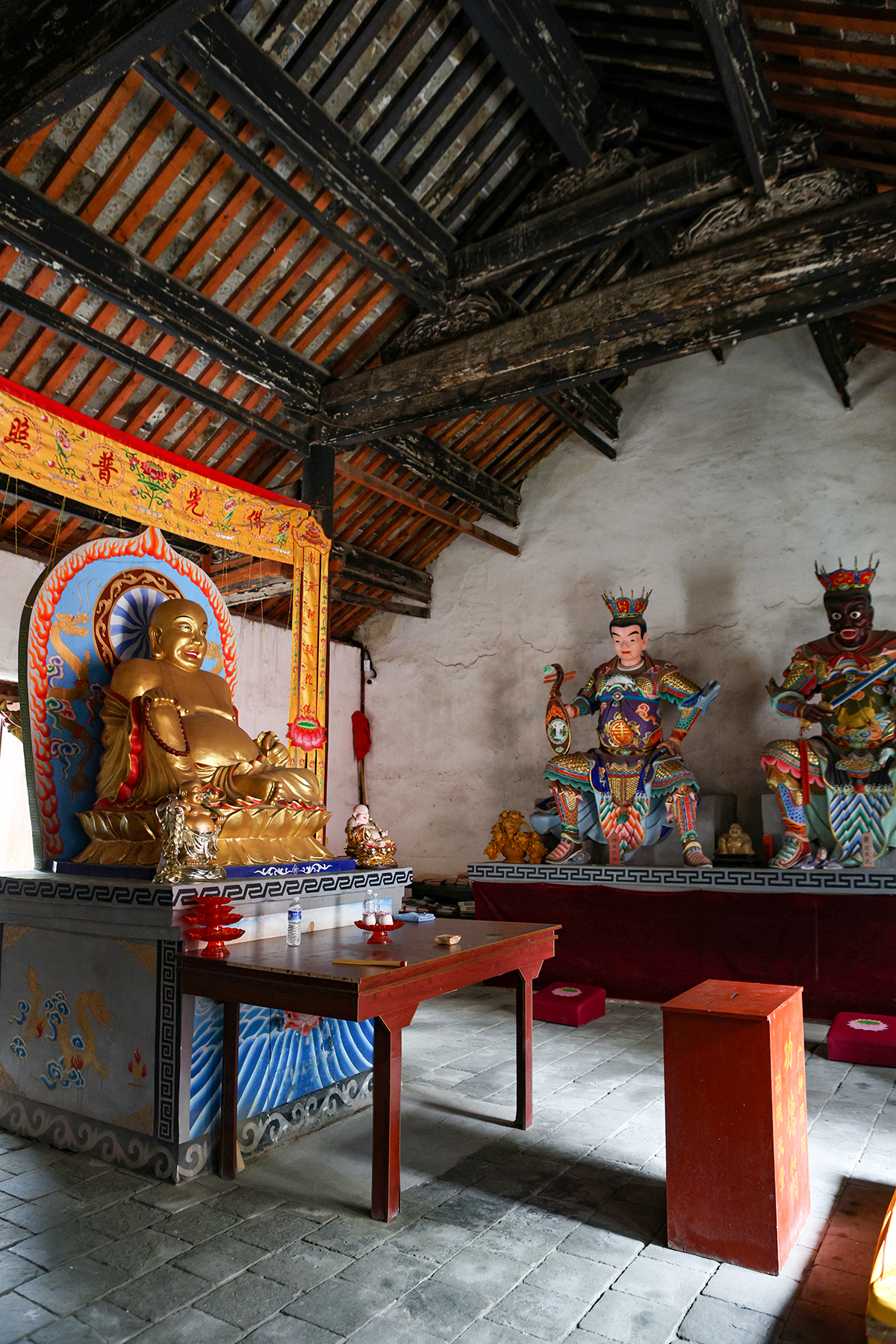
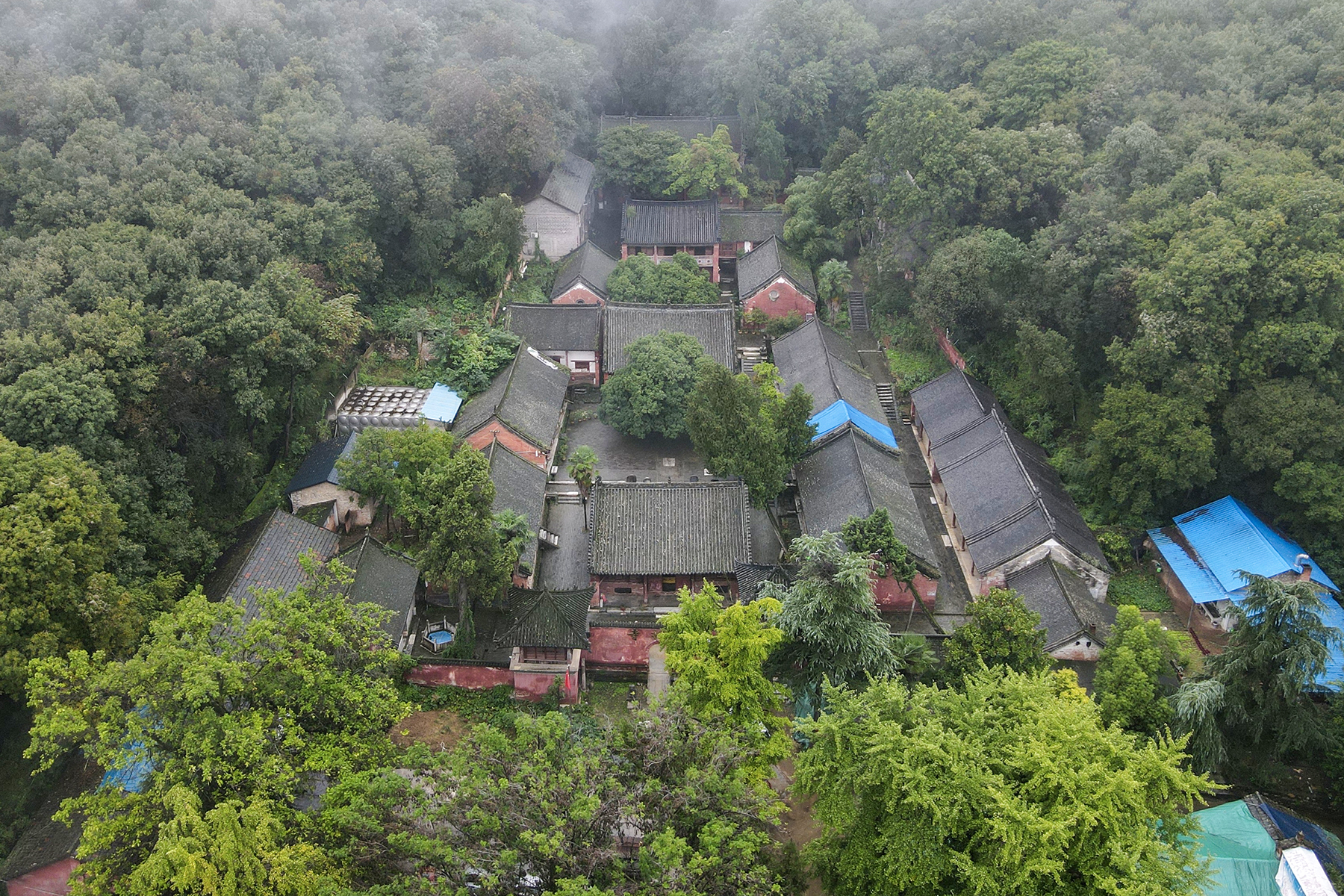

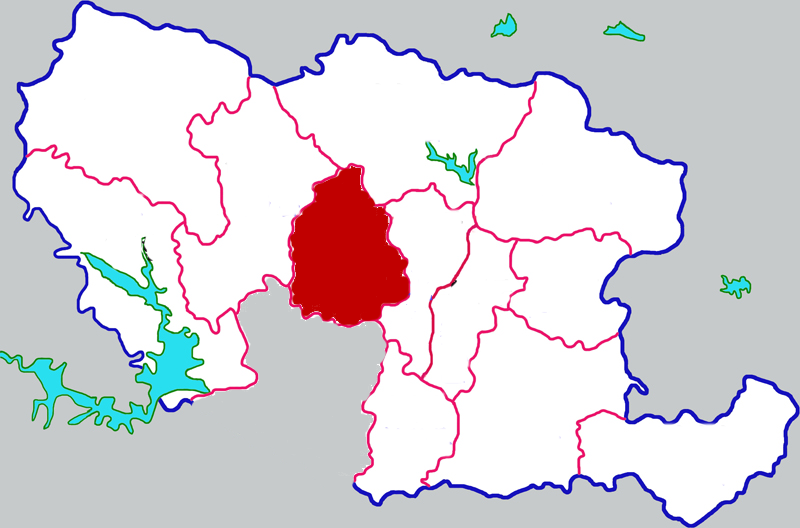
- Zhenping in Nanyang

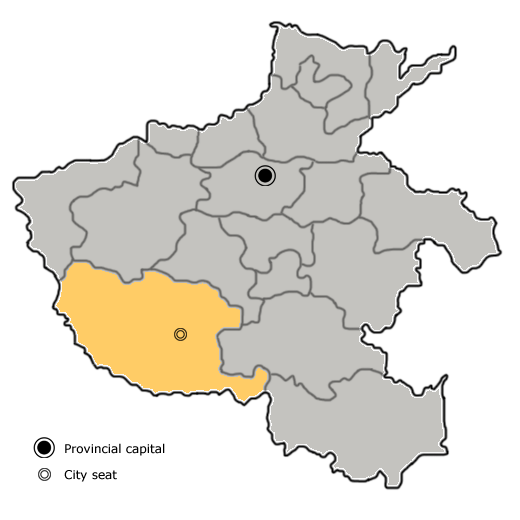
- Nanyang in Henan. Note the map includes the sub-prefecture-level city of Dengzhou.
- Country: People's Republic of China
- Province: Henan
- Prefecture-level city: Nanyang

Area
  - Total: 1,490 km^{2} (580 sq mi)

Population (2019)
  - Total: 869,400
  - Density: 583/km^{2} (1,510/sq mi)
- Time zone: UTC+8 (China Standard)
- Postal code: 474250

Zhenping County (simplified Chinese: 镇平县; traditional Chinese: 鎮平縣; pinyin: Zhènpíng Xiàn) is a county in the southwest of Henan province, China. It is under the administration of the prefecture-level city of Nanyang.

The total area is 1,580 square kilometers. According to the seventh population census data, as of 0:00 on November 1, 2020, the permanent population of Zhenping County was 829,780.

== Introduction ==
Zhenping was known in ancient times as Nieyang. It has a long history of jade carving for more than 4,000 years, and it is known as the jade capital of China. It is one of the birthplaces of Chinese jade culture. Jin Laizong Zhengda was set up in Zhenping County for three years (1226 AD). Yuan Haowen, a famous poet in the Jinyuan period, was the first county magistrate in Zhenping. Zhenping was also the hometown of the modern general Peng Xuefeng.

== History ==
Zhenping was established as a county in the third year of Jinzhengda (1226). It was separated from the original Deng County (now Dengzhou City). Zhenping County was originally located in Yangguan Town, Dengzhou, and then moved north to its present location.

The inscription on the stele "Record of the Reconstruction of Santan Dragon Temple in the Yuan Dynasty" records "Guyang Guan Town was established as a county and the town was leveled on the same day". Although the autonomous center of Zhenping was in Houji Town during the Wanxi Autonomous Period, after liberation, the county seat of Zhenping was not moved to Houji Town like Nanzhao moved the county seat to Liqingdian. Since moving north of Zhenping County to its current location, it has remained unchanged. However, the size of its city should increase or decrease with the changes of the times, at least it should be fine-tuned.

== Administrative divisions ==
As of 2012, this county is divided to 3 subdistricts, 11 towns, 7 townships and 1 ethnic township.

Subdistricts

- Nieyang Subdistrict (涅阳街道)
- Xuefeng Subdistrict (雪枫街道)
- Yudu Subdistrict (玉都街道)

Towns

- Shifosi (石佛寺镇)
- Chaobei (晁陂镇)
- Jiasong (贾宋镇)
- Houji (侯集镇)
- Laozhuang (老庄镇)
- Luyi (卢医镇)
- Zheshan (遮山镇)
- Gaoqiu (高丘镇)
- Qutun (曲屯镇)
- Zaoyuan (枣园镇)
- Yangying (杨营镇)

Townships

- Liuquanpu Township (柳泉铺乡)
- Erlong Township (二龙乡)
- Wanggang Township (王岗乡)
- Mazhuang Township (马庄乡)
- Zhanglin Township (张林乡)
- Anziying Township (安字营乡)
- Pengying Township (彭营乡)

Ethnic townships

- Guozhuang Hui Township (郭庄回族乡)

== Population ==
Zhenping County is a subordinate county under Nanyang City, Henan Province. It is composed of 32 ethnic groups and has a population of 1.0494 million.

== Culture ==
=== Famous people from Zhenping ===
Peng Xuefeng (1907–1944), senior commander and military strategist of the Chinese Workers’ and Peasants’ Red Army and New Fourth Army.

=== Temples, cathedrals, and mosques ===
Yang'an Temple, built in the Tang Dynasty and flourished in the Ming Dynasty. It is a precious national historical and cultural heritage. In 2019, the main hall of Yang'an Temple was selected into the eighth batch of national cultural relics protection units.

Puti Temple, located at the foot of Xinghua Mountain in Zhenping County. Apricot trees are widely planted on the mountain and peaches and pears are planted at the foot of the mountain.

=== Sights ===
Zhenping International Jade City, the world's largest wholesale and retail trading market for jade carvings and related handicrafts, integrating jade product sales, Buddhism promotion, cultural expos, park landscapes, tourism and leisure, and living and residence.

The 10,000-acre cherry orchard, located in Laozhuang Town, Zhenping County. It is a specialty fruit ecological plantation and an important part of the Bodhi Temple Scenic Area. Whenever the cherry blossoms bloom in early spring, the entire cherry orchard becomes a sea of flowers.

== Climate ==
Climate data for Zhenping, elevation 240 m (790 ft), (1991–2020 normals, extremes 1981–present)
Month	Jan	Feb	Mar	Apr	May	Jun	Jul	Aug	Sep	Oct	Nov	Dec	Year
Record high °C (°F)	21.8 (71.2)	22.9 (73.2)	30.5 (86.9)	34.4 (93.9)	39.8 (103.6)	40.4 (104.7)	38.7 (101.7)	38.4 (101.1)	38.6 (101.5)	33.5 (92.3)	27.9 (82.2)	21.3 (70.3)	40.4 (104.7)
Mean daily maximum °C (°F)	6.9 (44.4)	10.3 (50.5)	15.3 (59.5)	21.8 (71.2)	27.3 (81.1)	31.2 (88.2)	31.6 (88.9)	30.7 (87.3)	26.9 (80.4)	22.0 (71.6)	15.0 (59.0)	9.1 (48.4)	20.7 (69.2)
Daily mean °C (°F)	1.4 (34.5)	4.5 (40.1)	9.5 (49.1)	15.7 (60.3)	21.3 (70.3)	25.8 (78.4)	27.2 (81.0)	26.1 (79.0)	21.8 (71.2)	16.2 (61.2)	9.3 (48.7)	3.4 (38.1)	15.2 (59.3)
Mean daily minimum °C (°F)	−2.9 (26.8)	−0.1 (31.8)	4.4 (39.9)	9.8 (49.6)	15.4 (59.7)	20.7 (69.3)	23.4 (74.1)	22.3 (72.1)	17.6 (63.7)	11.6 (52.9)	4.9 (40.8)	−1.0 (30.2)	10.5 (50.9)
Record low °C (°F)	−14.6 (5.7)	−11.9 (10.6)	−8.6 (16.5)	−2.1 (28.2)	1.2 (34.2)	10.6 (51.1)	16.5 (61.7)	13.3 (55.9)	7.2 (45.0)	−2.1 (28.2)	−7.2 (19.0)	−16.3 (2.7)	−16.3 (2.7)
Average precipitation mm (inches)	10.0 (0.39)	12.4 (0.49)	26.6 (1.05)	42.7 (1.68)	72.3 (2.85)	98.5 (3.88)	145.0 (5.71)	126.8 (4.99)	68.6 (2.70)	47.2 (1.86)	30.2 (1.19)	9.6 (0.38)	689.9 (27.17)
Average precipitation days (≥ 0.1 mm)	4.5	5.6	6.9	8.0	9.3	9.1	11.8	11.1	9.4	8.2	6.4	4.8	95.1
Average snowy days	4.2	3.1	1.2	0.1	0	0	0	0	0	0	0.9	2.2	11.7
Average relative humidity (%)	67	66	69	72	68	68	80	81	76	71	72	68	72
Mean monthly sunshine hours	114.8	115.9	146.7	178.4	184.4	168.1	159.3	169.6	140.0	146.4	130.6	126.7	1,780.9
Percentage possible sunshine	36	37	39	46	43	39	37	41	38	42	42	41	40
Source: China Meteorological Administration

== Environment ==
Drinking water samples from 29 wells in Zhenping County, China, were collected and analyzed, with 35 water-quality parameters selected for spatial evaluation using GIS and an ant colony clustering algorithm.

== Traffic ==
The Ningxi Railway and G40 Shanghai–Xi'an Expressway run from east to west, while the Jiaozuo–Liuzhou railway and Tai'ao Expressway run from north to south. They are more than 30 kilometers east of Nanyang Jiangying Airport, and have basic land and air transportation conditions. They have been included in the "half hour economic circle" of the central urban area of Nanyang.

== Economy ==
The Henan Kangyuan Softshell Turtle Farm (河南省南阳镇平县康苑鳖业有限公司), located in Zhenping County's Jiasong Town is one of China's largest facilities for raising the Yellow River Turtle (黄河鳖), a variety of the Chinese softshell turtle. The farm, which occupies 600 mu (100 acres) of land and water, raises some 6 million of those creatures per year.

The Zhenping County Government has formulated a series of preferential policies, committed to creating a relaxed environment, expanding the reform and opening up, greatly improving infrastructure such as transportation, communication and energy, and achieving comprehensive economic development.

On May 9, 2019, after a provincial-level special evaluation and inspection, it met the poverty alleviation standards and officially withdrew from the poverty alleviation county sequence. In the same year, the gross domestic product of Zhenping County was 25.693 billion yuan, an increase of 7.1% compared to 2018.
