= Hong Xuezhi =

Chinese general and politician

- 洪学智
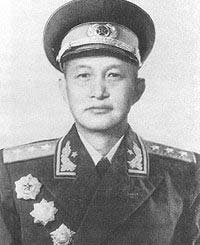
- Xuezhi in 1955
- Born: 2 February 1913; Shuanghe town, Shangcheng County, Henan, China (now in Jinzhai County, Anhui, China)
- Died: 20 November 2006 (aged 93); Beijing, China
- Military career
- Allegiance: China
- Rank: General
- Nicknames: "The 6-star colonel general" (liù xīng shàng jiàng, 六星上将)
- Conflicts: Chinese Civil War; Second Sino-Japanese War; Korean War
- Other work: Vice Chairperson of the Seventh and Eighth Chinese People's Political Consultative Conference (1990-1998)

Hong Xuezhi (Chinese: 洪学智; pinyin: Hóng Xuézhì; February 1913 – 20 November 2006) was a Chinese general and politician. A veteran of the Long March, he served as a deputy commander and the head of logistics of the Chinese People's Volunteers in the Korean War, and he twice led the People's Liberation Army's General Logistics Department.

Hong was dismissed in 1959 after being implicated in the case against Marshal Peng Dehuai, and he spent 18 years working in Jilin before returning to Beijing in 1977. He was made a general in 1955 and again in 1988, after the army restored military ranks, and he is the only person in the People's Republic of China to have received the rank twice. From 1990 to 1998, he was a vice chairman of the Chinese People's Political Consultative Conference.

== Early life ==
Hong was born in February 1913 in Tangjiahui, Shangcheng County, Henan, in an area that is now part of Jinzhai County, Anhui. He came from a poor peasant family.

== Military career ==
He joined a peasant association in 1927, began revolutionary work in March 1929 and became a member of the Chinese Communist Party in May of that year. After taking part in an uprising in southern Shangcheng in 1929, he became a squad leader in a local guerrilla unit that was later absorbed into the Red Army.

When the Red 1st and 15th Armies merged to form the Red 4th Army in 1931, Hong served in its 29th Regiment as a machine-gun platoon leader, deputy company commander, company commander and political instructor. He fought in the defence of the Eyuwan Soviet base area against the first four Nationalist encirclement campaigns. In the winter of 1932, he moved with the Fourth Front Army to the border region of Sichuan and Shaanxi, where he rose to head the political departments of the 92nd and 93rd Divisions of the Red 31st Army and later of the Red 4th Army.

In 1935, Hong joined the Long March as head of the organisation section of the Fourth Front Army's political department. According to the CPPCC Daily, when six soldiers collapsed from the cold while crossing Jiajin Mountain, he refused to abandon them and had all six carried down, and five of them survived. After reaching northern Shaanxi, he studied at the Anti-Japanese Red Army University and then at the Counter-Japanese Military and Political University, where he later commanded student units, including its 4th Regiment.

=== Second Sino-Japanese War ===
In November 1940, during the Second Sino-Japanese War, Hong led the cadre battalion of the 3rd Regiment to northern Jiangsu, and in June 1941 he reached the headquarters of the New Fourth Army at Yancheng. He then served as deputy head of the 5th Branch of the military and political university, as garrison commander of Yancheng and as commander of the Yanfu Military Region. In the Yanfu region, he raised local forces of eight regiments and a battalion, totalling more than 5,000 troops, within about a year, according to the CPPCC Daily.

In February 1943, Hong became chief of staff of the New Fourth Army's 3rd Division. As front-line commander in the Funing campaign of April 1945, he planned the operation and captured the city of Funing, which CPC News describes as the New Fourth Army's first major capture of a city in central China.

=== Second half of the Chinese Civil War ===
After the war against Japan, Hong became deputy commander and chief of staff of the 3rd Division, and he took part in the defence of Jinzhou and the attack on Tongliao in Northeast China. From January 1946, during the Chinese Civil War, he served in turn as deputy commander of the Liaoxi Military Region, commander of the Heilongjiang Military Region and commander of the 6th Column of the Northeast Field Army. He fought in the defence of Siping and in the offensives south of the Songhua River known as the three expeditions.

From November 1948, Hong commanded the 43rd Army in the Liaoshen and Pingjin campaigns. In May 1949, he became first deputy commander and chief of staff of the 15th Army Group of the Fourth Field Army, which he helped to lead south into central China. In the Guangdong campaign, his forces broke through the defensive line of Bai Chongxi's army group from the left flank, and Bai's forces were destroyed in Guangxi in mid-December 1949.

After the capture of Guangzhou, Hong served as deputy commander and chief of staff of the Guangdong Military Region and as commander of its coastal defences. In 1950, he took part in the Hainan campaign, and in the Wanshan Archipelago Campaign he commanded both army and naval units in attacks on the defenders' anchorages and islands, one of the earliest joint army–navy landings by the People's Liberation Army (PLA).

=== Korean War ===
In July 1950, Hong became deputy commander of the 13th Army Group. When China entered the Korean War in October 1950, he was appointed a deputy commander of the Chinese People's Volunteers (CPV) under Peng Dehuai. According to his son Hong Hu, he was responsible for the headquarters, the specialist arms and logistics. In a 2003 study based partly on Hong's memoirs, the analyst John J. Tkacik Jr. wrote that on 17 October 1950 Hong and Deng Hua telephoned Peng to warn that the troops lacked air cover and that the ground was frozen, and recommended waiting until spring.

Hong was in charge of security at the CPV headquarters, and before dawn on 25 November 1950 he forced a reluctant Peng into an air-raid shelter on the hillside, where Peng, Hong and Deng studied the battle situation for more than two hours, according to the PLA Daily. An American air raid that day struck Peng's quarters and killed Mao Anying, the son of Mao Zedong, who was serving at the headquarters. Mao Anying's identity was known only to Peng, Deng, Hong and a few staff in the office. Hong Hu later said that his father saved Peng a second time at another headquarters site, where Hong had engineers deepen a shallow shelter and build a sandbag wall overnight, and an air raid the next morning hit Peng's house and left more than 70 bullet holes in the sandbags.

The CPV's supply routes came under constant air attack, and its food and ammunition supplies lagged behind its operations. Tkacik cited Hong's account that UN aircraft destroyed up to 40 percent of supplies in transit and that more than 3,000 Chinese trucks were lost in seven months. In 1951, Hong also became commander of the CPV's new rear services command, which official accounts date to May or June of that year. Hong Hu said that his father had proposed the command and built a centralised system of logistics command under it.

Facing the American air interdiction campaign, Hong toured the front and reorganised the supply system, combining supply by area with supply through each unit's own chain of command, and he integrated transport, emergency repair and air defence, according to the CPPCC Daily. The historian Xiaobing Li credits him with a new system that supplied positions at the front rather than particular armies, through area depots that any Chinese or North Korean unit in the sector could use, and argues that it improved supply at regimental and battalion level. The CPPCC Daily states that Hong directed about 180,000 logistics personnel and built more than 8,000 shelters for trucks, and that Mao ordered the army to study the logistics experience of the Korean front. At Hong's request, General Chen Geng ordered idle troops and Korean civilians to repair roads and railways in September 1951, according to Tkacik.

Hong Hu recalled that when Peng doubted the logistics service's reports on food supplies, he investigated in person, found that a few soldiers had bartered goods for chickens, and then apologised to Hong. In his later account of the war, Hong argued that the CPV had benefited from rear areas close to the front, while American and UN forces relied on much longer supply lines. A 2024 testimony by Cristina Garafola of the RAND Corporation to the United States–China Economic and Security Review Commission described this advantage as still relevant to any conflict on China's periphery. Hong returned to China in 1954.

=== General Logistics Department and dismissal ===
On his return, Hong became deputy director of the General Logistics Department in 1954 and its director in 1956. The CPPCC Daily credits him with building the department's logistics framework and says that he returned 2.5 billion yuan in savings to the state over six years. He was made a general (shangjiang) in 1955. He was also an alternate member of the 8th Central Committee of the party.

In 1959, after the Lushan Conference, Hong was removed from his post because he was implicated in the case against Peng, which CPC News now describes as a wrongful verdict. In 1960, he was transferred to Jilin as director of the provincial agricultural machinery department, and he also headed its heavy industry department. His team produced China's first self-propelled combine harvester on a trial basis in April 1964, according to the CPPCC Daily. During the Cultural Revolution, he was sent in 1970 to do manual labour at the Jinbaotun farm in Jilin, where he grew vegetables, raised pigs and made tofu. He spent 18 years working in Jilin in all, and his son said that he seldom spoke about this period.

=== Return to Beijing ===
Hong returned to Beijing in 1977 as director of the National Defence Industry Office of the State Council, and he became a member of the Central Military Commission (CMC). The CPPCC Daily states that he restored order in the military industries and promoted the combination of military and civilian production. He was elected to the 11th Central Committee in 1979 and to the 12th Central Committee, and he was a member of the Standing Committee of the 5th National People's Congress.

In 1980, Hong was again appointed director of the General Logistics Department, adding the post of political commissar in 1985, and he also became a deputy secretary-general of the CMC. During his second term, he launched surveys and reforms covering border and coastal defence, warehouses, barracks, hospitals and finance, and he introduced a basic food standard for troops. He was elected to the Central Advisory Commission in 1985. On 14 September 1988, after military ranks were restored, Hong was one of 17 senior officers made generals at a ceremony at Huairen Hall in Zhongnanhai. General was the highest rank conferred under the restored system, and he was the only officer made a general both in 1955 and in 1988. At the time, he was a deputy secretary-general of the CMC.

In March 1990, Hong was elected a vice chairman of the 7th National Committee of the Chinese People's Political Consultative Conference (CPPCC), and he held the same post in the 8th National Committee until 1998. He supported the development of Jinzhai County, including its transport and local industry, and he helped to secure donations for education there from a businessman from Hong Kong who was also a CPPCC member.

== Death ==
Hong died of illness in Beijing at 10:10 pm on 20 November 2006. The Xinhua News Agency obituary called him a proletarian revolutionary and military strategist and a pioneer of the PLA's modern logistics work.

== Personal life ==
Hong was married to Zhang Wen for about 70 years. She was born in July 1919 in Tongjiang County, Sichuan, joined the Red Army in 1933 and the Communist Party in 1936, and made the Long March with the Fourth Front Army. She later served as an adviser in the administration bureau of the General Logistics Department.

The couple had eight children. Their eldest son Hong Hu was born in 1940 in Jinzhai, and he was governor of Jilin from 1998 to 2004. Hong Hu said that his father told his children not to expect him to smooth the way for their careers, and that his father's case delayed his own admission to the party and kept him from joining the army after he graduated. The CPPCC Daily describes the household as frugal, and it says that Hong set eight strict rules on gifts, meals and the conduct of his relatives and staff, and that the family paid for eight students from poor families to complete university.

== Honours ==
=== Domestic ===
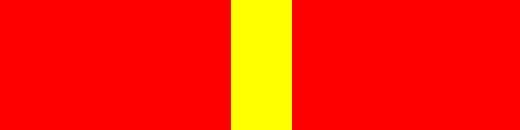
Order of 1 August (1st Class Medal) (1955)
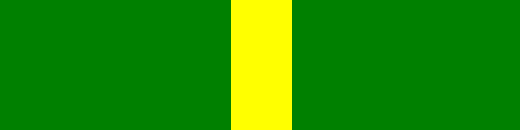
Order of Independence and Freedom (1st Class Medal) (1955)
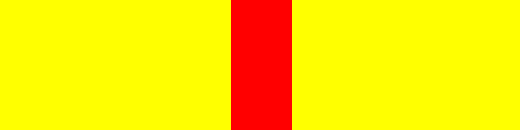
Order of Liberation (1st Class Medal) (1955)
Red Star Medal of Honour (1st Class Medal) (1988)

=== Foreign ===
Order of the National Flag (1st Class Medal) (North Korea)
Order of Freedom and Independence (1st Class Medal) (North Korea)

== Works ==
- 抗美援朝战争回忆 (Recollections of the War to Resist America and Aid Korea). Beijing: PLA Literature Press, 1990.
- 洪学智回忆录 (Memoirs of Hong Xuezhi). Beijing: PLA Press, 2nd edition, 2007.
- "The CPVF's Combat and Logistics". In Mao's Generals Remember Korea, translated and edited by Xiaobing Li, Allan R. Millett and Bin Yu. Lawrence: University Press of Kansas, 2001.
