= Zhang Zongxun =

Chinese general

- 张宗逊
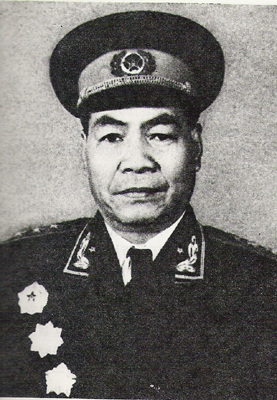
- Born: February 7, 1908; Weinan, Shaanxi, Qing China
- Died: September 14, 1998 (aged 90); Beijing, China
- Military career
- Allegiance: China
- Branch: People's Liberation Army Ground Force
- Service years: 1926-1978
- Rank: Colonel General
- Conflicts: Chinese Civil War; Second Sino-Japanese War

Zhang Zongxun (simplified Chinese: 张宗逊; traditional Chinese: 張宗遜; pinyin: Zhāng Zōngxùn, 7 February 1908 – 14 September 1998) was a Chinese general who served as a deputy chief of the General Staff of the People's Liberation Army from 1952 and as director of its General Logistics Department from 1973 to 1978. A veteran of the Autumn Harvest Uprising and the Long March, he commanded the 358th Brigade of the Eighth Route Army during the Second Sino-Japanese War and was a deputy commander under Peng Dehuai in northwest China during the Chinese Civil War. He was made a general in 1955. His son Zhang Youxia became a vice chairman of the Central Military Commission.

== Early life and education ==
Zhang was born on 7 February 1908 into a peasant family in Yantou village in Weinan, Shaanxi. He began studying at a village private school at the age of seven. In 1922, he entered the Chishui Vocational School, where he was introduced to Marxism by local revolutionaries including Wang Shangde and took part in student patriotic movements. In May 1924, he joined the Socialist Youth League of China, and he helped set up peasant associations and popular education groups. In the autumn of 1925, during the First United Front, he joined the Kuomintang.

In February 1926, Zhang entered the fifth class of the Whampoa Military Academy, and that year he joined the Chinese Communist Party. At the academy, he attended lectures on the political situation given by Zhou Enlai. After the Zhongshan Warship Incident, he left the Kuomintang and openly declared his membership of the Communist Party. After graduating in 1927, he served in the National Revolutionary Army as a battalion political instructor in the 8th Army, a platoon leader in the 24th Division and a company commander in the guard regiment of the headquarters of the Second Front Army.

== Military career ==
On 9 September 1927, Zhang took part in the Autumn Harvest Uprising led by Mao Zedong as commander of the 6th Company of the 1st Regiment of the Workers' and Peasants' Revolutionary Army. He led the vanguard during the advance and the rearguard during the withdrawal, which brought him to Mao's attention. After the Sanwan reorganisation, he became a regimental staff officer and deputy company commander, and he followed Mao to the Jinggang Mountains. He was wounded in November 1927 and recovered about three months later. After the forces of Zhu De and Mao joined in May 1928, he became a company commander in the Red Fourth Army, and in June 1928, he became commander of a company in its 31st Regiment.

In January 1929, Zhang became deputy commander and then commander of the 9th Detachment of the Red Fourth Army's 3rd Column, and he fought in southern Jiangxi and western Fujian to establish the Central Soviet Area. In October 1930, he became commander of the 36th Division of the First Front Army. In the first of the Nationalist encirclement campaigns, his forces helped destroy the headquarters and two brigades of the Nationalist 18th Division and captured its commander Zhang Huizan. He later commanded the 12th Army and the 14th Division and was concurrently garrison commander of Guangchang.

In April 1934, after Guangchang fell, Zhang was removed from his divisional command by the party leadership, which suspected him of belonging to Mao's faction. In May 1934, he visited Mao, who was then out of favour, in Changting, and Mao advised him to seek out Zhou Enlai. In June 1934, after Zhou intervened, he was appointed president and political commissar of the Red Army University.

=== Long March ===
After the Red Army began the Long March in October 1934, Zhang became chief of staff of the Central Military Commission's Second Field Column and then commander of the 4th Division of the Third Army Group. At the crossing of the Xiang River, his division held a crossing point for a day against Guangxi troops to cover the passage of the central column. He fought at Loushan Pass and in the capture of Zunyi, and after the army group was reorganised, he commanded its 10th Regiment. On 28 February 1935, he was seriously wounded in the leg in fighting against the forces of Xue Yue near Zunyi.

In August 1935, Zhang became chief of staff of the 4th Army of the Fourth Front Army, serving with Xu Shiyou, and he was later chief of staff of the Red Army University. He opposed the split led by Zhang Guotao, who placed him under surveillance as a supporter of Mao, Zhou, Zhang Wentian and Bo Gu, and in February 1936, Zhang Guotao's rival military commission gave him a severe warning. In January 1937, after he reached Bao'an, Mao brought him to headquarters, and he was appointed director of the First Bureau of the Central Military Commission and garrison commander of five counties including Yan'an.

=== Second Sino-Japanese War ===
After the outbreak of the Second Sino-Japanese War, Zhang became commander of the 358th Brigade of the Eighth Route Army's 120th Division and led it to the front in northwest Shanxi. On 18 October 1937, his brigade ambushed Japanese forces south of Yanmen Pass. In October 1938, he moved into the Shanxi–Chahar–Hebei border region, and on 3 November 1938, his forces ambushed a Japanese battalion at Huashipian, killing more than 700 Japanese troops. In 1939, he fought in central Hebei and took part in the battle of Chenzhuang.

In 1940, Zhang returned to northwest Shanxi, where his forces ambushed a Japanese unit at Miyu from 17 to 19 June, killing more than 700 men. In August 1940, he took part in the Hundred Regiments Offensive and captured Kangjiahui, the largest Japanese stronghold on the Jingle–Xinxian road. In November 1940, he also became commander of the 3rd Military Sub-district of the Shanxi–Suiyuan Military Region.

In June 1943, Mao ordered Zhang to lead his troops back across the Yellow River to defend the Shaanxi–Gansu–Ningxia Border Region against a feared Nationalist attack. In August 1945, when Nationalist forces attacked the border region's Guanzhong area, he commanded the counterattack at Yetaishan, with Xi Zhongxun as political commissar, and between 8 and 10 August, his forces recovered the lost territory. He was then appointed deputy commander of the Shanxi–Suiyuan Field Army and commander and political commissar of the Lüliang Military Region.

=== Chinese Civil War ===
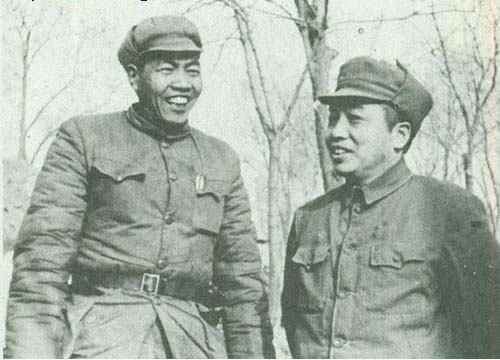
Zhang with Peng Dehuai in 1949

In mid-1946, Zhang became commander of the Datong Front Headquarters and directed the Datong–Jining Campaign, in which, according to official accounts, his forces killed or wounded more than 12,000 enemy troops. However, the attack on Datong failed after the forces of Fu Zuoyi counterattacked, a defeat that has been attributed to underestimation of the enemy and errors of command. In November 1946, he became commander of the 1st Column of the Shanxi–Suiyuan Military Region and moved to the Yan'an area to defend the party's central leadership. On 10 February 1947, he became commander of the Shaanxi–Gansu–Ningxia Field Army, with Xi Zhongxun again as political commissar.

Zhang helped Peng Dehuai direct the battles of Qinghuabian, Yangmahe and Panlong, three victories in the defence of the border region. In July 1947, he became deputy commander of the Northwest Field Army under Peng and commander of its 1st Column, and he helped direct the Yulin and Shajiadian campaigns. From 1948, when the army moved onto the offensive, he took part in the Yichuan and Xifu–Longdong campaigns, which tied down the forces of Hu Zongnan in the northwest. In February 1949, he became deputy commander of the First Field Army, and he led its spring offensive and the central Shaanxi campaign and took part in the Fumei and Lanzhou campaigns. He then headed the Lanzhou Military Control Commission.

=== Northwest and General Staff ===
After the founding of the People's Republic of China in 1949, Zhang served as deputy commander of the First Field Army and the Northwest Military Region, chief procurator of the northwest branch of the Supreme People's Procuratorate, and a member of the Northwest Military and Administrative Committee. In October 1950, when Peng went to command Chinese forces in the Korean War, Mao approved Zhang as acting commander of the Northwest Military Region. In October 1952, he became a deputy chief of the General Staff and head of its military academies department, and in April 1955, he also became deputy director of the Training Inspectorate. He led the army's training and the development of its academies for many years and helped draft its regulations and textbooks. In October 1955, he was made a general and received the first class of the Order of August First, the Order of Independence and Freedom and the Order of Liberation. He was a member of the first three National Defence Councils.

=== 1958 anti-dogmatism campaign ===
In 1957, Zhang led a work team to the military academy in Nanjing, and his report praised its results but said that it had adopted many Soviet practices unsuited to the Chinese army. In March 1958, at a cadre conference of the Training Inspectorate, he was sharply criticised as a representative of "conservatism". A work team from the General Political Department then declared that the conference was an attack on the party, because opposing Zhang meant opposing Peng Dehuai and therefore the party's central leadership. The conference was turned into a campaign against "dogmatism" in the training system. In his memoirs, General Xiao Ke wrote that Zhang said that "opposing me is opposing Marshal Peng, opposing the Military Commission and opposing the party". Xiao also wrote that Zhang, who had earlier been among the loudest advocates of learning from the Soviet Union, joined Gan Siqi and others in denouncing the army's common regulations as an anti-party programme.

=== Later career ===
In 1971, Zhang was appointed deputy commander of the Jinan Military Region. From June 1973 to February 1978, he was director of the General Logistics Department. He was an alternate member of the 7th and 8th Central Committees and a full member of the 10th Central Committee. In June 1983, he became a member of the 6th National Committee of the Chinese People's Political Consultative Conference.

== Personal life ==
Zhang Zongxun's son, Zhang Youxia, is a veteran of the 1979 Sino-Vietnamese War, and was the first-ranked Vice Chairman of the Central Military Commission. In January 2026, Zhang was put under investigation over "suspected violations of discipline" and became one of the highest-ranking military officers to fall from power since the era of Mao Zedong.

Zhang Zongxun died in Beijing on 14 September 1998, at the age of 90.

== Awards and honors ==
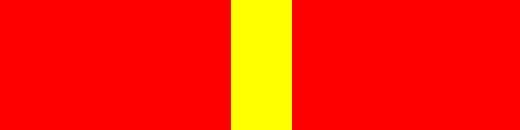
Order of August 1 (1st Class Medal) (1955)
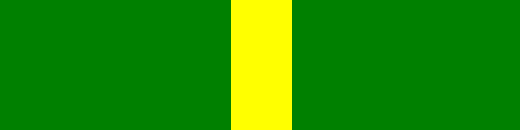
Order of Independence and Freedom (1st Class Medal) (1955)
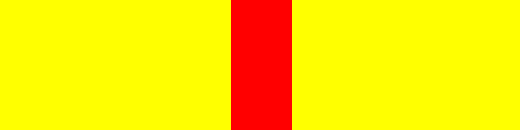
Order of Liberation (1st Class Medal) (1955)
Red Star Medal of Merit (1st Class Medal) (1988)
