= Jinan Military Region =

Former PLA military region of China

- Active: 1955(?)-2016
- Country: (China)
- Garrison/HQ: Jinan

Commanders
- Current commander: Zhao Zongqi

The Jinan Military Region was a PLA Military Region located in the east of the People's Republic of China, covering the Shandong and Henan Provinces, which also formed military districts. It appears that Yang Dezhi was one of the first commander of the Jinan MR, from 1958. It was considered a strategic reserve. It included some of the area previously within the Wuhan Military Region, which was disbanded in 1985–88.

The 5th Air Corps was established in Weifeng, Shandong Province, in 1952, possibly from the disbanding 11th Corps, but was moved to Hangzhou in the Nanjing Military Region by 1954.

After 1975 the 46th Army was transferred from Xuzhou, Jiangsu Province to Linyi, Shandong. It was disestablished in 1985. There were previously three Group Armies within the Region, the 20th Group Army at Kaifeng, the 26th Group Army at Weifang, and the 54th in Xinxiang. It previously included the now disbanded 67th Group Army.

The Jinan Military Region was disbanded in the reorganisation of 2015–16, being split between the Northern Theatre Command and the Central Theatre Command.

Jinan Military Region
- Jinan Military Region (highlighted)
- Simplified Chinese: 济南军区
- Traditional Chinese: 濟南軍區
Transcriptions
Standard Mandarin
- Hanyu Pinyin: Jǐnán Jūnqū

== Structure ==
In 2006, the International Institute for Strategic Studies attributed the formation with 190,000 personnel, including two armoured divisions, one mechanised infantry division, three motorised infantry divisions, one artillery division, one armoured brigade, one mechanised infantry brigade, four motorised infantry brigades, two artillery brigades, three anti-aircraft brigades, and an anti-tank regiment.

- 20th Group Army (Kaifeng, Henan)
  - 11th Armoured Brigade with 20th Group Army at Xuchang.
  - other units
- 26th Group Army (Weifang, Shandong)
- 54th Group Army (Xinxiang, Henan)
  - 127th Mechanized Infantry Division within 54th Group Army, at Luoyang, a ready reaction unit
  - 162nd Motorized Infantry Division
  - 11th Armored Division (Xianyang)
  - Artillery Brigade (Jiaozou, Henan)
  - 1st Air Defence Brigade (Xingyang)
  - 1st Army Aviation Regiment (Xinxiang)

In the Military Balance 2014, the IISS listed the Jinan Military Region Air Force as consisting of the 5th Aviation Division, with two attack regiments; the 12th Fighter Division, with three fighter regiments; the 19th Fighter Division, with two fighter and one training regiment; the 32nd Aviation Division with one fighter and one training regiment; a Flight Instructor Training Base; and four surface-to-air missile battalions (IISS 2014, 238).

== Commanders and commissars, 2010-2015 ==
- Zhao Zongqi (Commander), since November 2012
  - Wang Jun (Deputy Commander), since December 2011
  - Ji Wenming (Deputy Commander), since July 2014
  - Liu Zhigang (Deputy Commander), since December 2014
  - Zhang Ming (Chief-of-Staff), since December 2014
- Du Hengyan (Political Commissar), since July 2010
  - Lü Jiancheng (Deputy Political Commissar), since July 2010
  - Wu Shezhou (Political Department Director) since December 2014

== Nickname ==
Organizations affiliated with the Jinan Military Region often used the nickname "vanguard" (Chinese: 前卫; pinyin: qiánweì; lit. 'front guard'), including the Vanguard Performance Troupe (Chinese: 前卫文工团) and the Vanguard Newspaper (Chinese: 前卫报).
