= Alternates of the 15th Central Committee of the Chinese Communist Party =

The 15th Central Committee of the Chinese Communist Party was elected by the 15th National Congress in 1997, with 151 individuals serving as alternates during this term.

== Alternates ==
Alternates of the 15th Central Committee of the Chinese Communist Party
Ballot	Name		14th CC	16th CC	Birth	PM	Death	Birthplace	Ethnicity	Gender	Ref.
1	Ou Zegao (Note: Ou Zegao was advanced from alternate to member of the 15th Central Committee to fill a vacant seat, by a decision of the 3rd Plenary Session of the 15th Central Committee, held on 12–14 October 1998.)	欧泽高	Nonmember	Alternate	1947	1981	Alive	Sichuan	Tibetan	Male	
2	Yue Haiyan (Note: Yue Haiyan was advanced from alternate to member of the 15th Central Committee to fill a vacant seat, by a decision of the 5th Plenary Session of the 15th Central Committee, held on 24–26 September 2000.)	岳海岩	Alternate	Nonmember	1937	1956	2005	Liaoning	Han	Male	
3	Huang Zhiquan (Note: Huang Zhiquan was advanced from alternate to member of the 15th Central Committee to fill a vacant seat, by a decision of the decision of the 6th Plenary Session of the 15th Central Committee, held on 24–26 September 2001.)	黄智权	Nonmember	Member	1942	1979	Alive	Zhejiang	Han	Male	
4	Wang Zhengfu	王正福	Nonmember	Alternate	1947	1984	Alive	Guizhou	Miao	Male	
5	Shi Zhaobin	石兆彬	Alternate	Nonmember	1945	1970	Alive	Fujian	Han	Male	
6	Tang Honggao	汤洪高	Alternate	Nonmember	1939	1973	Alive	Shandong	Han	Male	
7	Yang Jianqiang	杨健强	Alternate	Nonmember	1948	1975	Alive	Yunnan	Bai	Male	
8	Gao Siren	高祀仁	Alternate	Member	1944	1968	Alive	Shandong	Han	Male	
9	Chu Bo	储波	Nonmember	Member	1944	1969	Alive	Anhui	Han	Male	
10	Cai Changsong	蔡长松	Nonmember	Nonmember	1941	1965	Alive	Hunan	Han	Male	
11	Zhao Jinduo	赵金铎	Alternate	Nonmember	1943	1979	Alive	Hebei	Manchu	Male	
12	Sangyejia	桑结加	Alternate	Nonmember	1942	1972	Alive	Qinghai	Tibetan	Male	
13	Huang Yinkui	黄寅逵	Nonmember	Nonmember	1940	1964	Alive	Shanghai	Han	Male	
14	Uyunqimg	乌云其木格	Alternate	Member	1942	1966	2024	Liaoning	Mongolian	Female	
15	Ren Qixing	任启兴	Nonmember	Nonmember	1942	1965	Alive	Anhui	Han	Male	
16	Su Rong	苏荣	Alternate	Member	1948	1974	Alive	Jilin	Han	Male	
17	Zhang Huazhu	张华祝	Nonmember	Alternate	1945	1965	Alive	Jiangsu	Han	Male	
18	Lu Hao	陆浩	Nonmember	Nonmember	1947	1981	Alive	Hebei	Han	Male	
19	Guo Jinlong	郭金龙	Nonmember	Member	1947	1979	Alive	Jiangsu	Han	Male	
20	Guan Guozhong	管国忠	Nonmember	Alternate	1952	1978	Alive	Yunnan	Dai	Male	
21	Wang Xueping	王学萍	Nonmember	Nonmember	1938	1956	Alive	Hainan	Li	Male	
22	Aisihaiti Kerimbai	艾斯海提·克里木拜	Nonmember	Alternate	1947	1975	Alive	Xinjiang	Kazakh	Male	
23	Shi Yuzhen	石玉珍	Alternate	Alternate	1947	1964	Alive	Hunan	Miao	Female	
24	Zhang Dingfa	张定发	Nonmember	Alternate	1943	1964	2006	Shanghai	Han	Male	
25	Jia Zhibang	贾治邦	Alternate	Member	1946	1962	Alive	Shaanxi	Han	Male	
26	Huang Yao	黄瑶	Alternate	Alternate	1948	1978	Alive	Guizhou	Buyi	Male	
27	Gong Gucheng	龚谷成	Alternate	Nonmember	1940	1958	Alive	Hunan	Han	Male	
28	Ge Dongsheng	葛东升	Nonmember	Nonmember	1946	1969	Alive	Shandong	Han	Male	
29	Ma Qingsheng	马庆生	Nonmember	Nonmember	1944	1979	Alive	Anhui	Hui	Male	
30	Wang Zhan	王占	Alternate	Nonmember	1941	1965	Alive	Hebei	Han	Male	
31	Wang Guangxian	王广宪	Alternate	Nonmember	1941	1973	Alive	Zhejiang	Han	Male	
32	Quan Zhezhu	全哲洙	Nonmember	Alternate	1952	1969	Alive	Jilin	Korean	Male	
33	Liu Zhenwu	刘镇武	Nonmember	Member	1945	1964	Alive	Hunan	Han	Male	
34	Zhou Shengtao	周声涛	Nonmember	Nonmember	1944	1966	Alive	Jiangsu	Han	Male	
35	Hu Yongzhu	胡永柱	Nonmember	Alternate	1944	1964	Alive	Sichuan	Han	Male	
36	Shi Zongyuan	石宗源	Alternate	Member	1945	1979	2013	Hebei	Hui	Male	
37	Lü Feijie	吕飞杰	Nonmember	Nonmember	1943	1984	Alive	Fujian	Han	Male	
38	Liu Zemin	刘泽民	Alternate	Alternate	1944	1960	2017	Shanxi	Han	Male	
39	Wu Yuqian	吴玉谦	Alternate	Alternate	1943	1963	2016	Shandong	Han	Male	
40	Zhang Baoming	张宝明	Nonmember	Nonmember	1940	1974	Alive	Heilongjiang	Han	Male	
41	Qian Guanlin	钱冠林	Nonmember	Nonmember	1946	1973	Alive	Jiangsu	Han	Male	
42	Gao Yixin	高宜新	Nonmember	Nonmember	1943	1968	2011	Shaanxi	Han	Male	
43	Wang Wulong	王武龙	Nonmember	Nonmember	1942	1965	Alive	Jiangsu	Han	Male	
44	Wang Jianmin	王建民	Nonmember	Member	1942	1963	2021	Gansu	Han	Male	
45	Xu Yunhong	许运鸿	Nonmember	Nonmember	1945	1978	Alive	Jiangsu	Han	Male	
46	Li Yuanzheng	李元正	Nonmember	Nonmember	1940	1974	Alive	Shandong	Han	Male	
47	Ji Yunshi	季允石	Nonmember	Member	1945	1975	Alive	Jiangsu	Han	Male	
48	Fang Fengyou	房凤友	Nonmember	Nonmember	1941	1961	Alive	Tianjin	Han	Male	
49	Qin Yuqin	秦玉琴	Alternate	Nonmember	1943	1965	Alive	Shandong	Han	Female	
50	Wang Yunlong	王云龙	Alternate	Member	1945	1966	Alive	Shanxi	Han	Male	
51	Yang Yongliang	杨永良	Alternate	Alternate	1944	1970	2012	Anhui	Han	Male	
52	Song Zhaosu	宋照肃	Nonmember	Nonmember	1941	1964	2022	Henan	Han	Male	
53	Zhang Xianglin	张祥林	Nonmember	Nonmember	1940	1960	Alive	Shandong	Han	Male	
54	Fan Qinchen	范钦臣	Alternate	Nonmember	1941	1960	Alive	Henan	Han	Male	
55	Cui Lintao	崔林涛	Nonmember	Nonmember	1942	1966	Alive	Shaanxi	Han	Male	
56	Wang Qiren	王启人	Nonmember	Nonmember	1941	1973	2001	Shaanxi	Han	Male	
57	Wang Qimin	王启民	Nonmember	Nonmember	1937	1978	2024	Zhejiang	Han	Male	
58	Lie Que	列确	Nonmember	Member	1944	1972	Alive	Tibet	Tibetan	Male	
59	Xu Qiliang	许其亮	Alternate	Member	1950	1967	2025	Shandong	Han	Male	
60	Sun Chunlan	孙春兰	Nonmember	Alternate	1950	1969	Alive	Hebei	Han	Female	
61	Li Qinglin	李清林	Nonmember	Nonmember	1944	1969	2021	Jilin	Han	Male	
62	Li Jiating	李嘉廷	Alternate	Nonmember	1944	1964	Alive	Yunnan	Yi	Male	
63	Chen Jianguo	陈建国	Nonmember	Member	1945	1962	Alive	Shandong	Han	Male	
64	Qin Guangrong	秦光荣	Nonmember	Alternate	1950	1972	Alive	Hunan	Han	Male	
65	Gao Zhongxing	高中兴	Nonmember	Alternate	1943	1964	2021	Qingdao	Han	Male	
66	Xie Qihua	谢企华	Nonmember	Alternate	1943	1966	Alive	Zhejiang	Han	Female	
67	Danzeng	丹增	Alternate	Nonmember	1946	1965	Alive	Tibet	Tibetan	Male	
68	Zhu Chengyou	朱成友	Nonmember	Alternate	1941	1961	Alive	Liaoning	Han	Male	
69	Liu Zhenhua	刘振华	Alternate	Nonmember	1940	1974	Alive	Shandong	Han	Male	
70	Shen Binyi	沈宾义	Nonmember	Nonmember	1944	1966	2023	Zhejiang	Han	Male	
71	Song Xiuyan	宋秀岩	Nonmember	Alternate	1955	1978	Alive	Tianjin	Han	Female	
72	Liang Guoqing	梁国庆	Nonmember	Nonmember	1938	1972	Alive	Jilin	Han	Male	
73	Wang Jinshan	王金山	Nonmember	Member	1945	1971	2026	Jilin	Han	Male	
74	Sun Shuyi	孙淑义	Nonmember	Alternate	1945	1971	Alive	Shandong	Han	Male	
75	Li Qianyuan	李乾元	Nonmember	Member	1942	1963	Alive	Henan	Han	Male	
76	Zhao Zhongxian	赵忠贤	Nonmember	Nonmember	1941	1973	Alive	Liaoning	Han	Male	
77	Xu Ziqiang	徐自强	Nonmember	Nonmember	1938	1961	Alive	Zhejiang	Han	Male	
78	Shi Wanpeng	石万鹏	Nonmember	Nonmember	1937	1971	2023	Tianjin	Han	Male	
79	Chen Jiaer	陈佳洱	Nonmember	Nonmember	1934	1952	Alive	Shanghai	Han	Male	
80	Niu Shaoyao	牛绍尧	Nonmember	Nonmember	1944	1973	2014	Yunnan	Han	Male	
81	Yang Xiaotang	杨晓堂	Nonmember	Nonmember	1942	1966	Alive	Shandong	Han	Male	
82	Song Fatang	宋法棠	Nonmember	Member	1940	1961	Alive	Shandong	Han	Male	
83	Bagatur	巴特爾	Nonmember	Nonmember	1955	1981	Alive	Liaoning	Mongolian	Male	
84	Li Zhaoxing	李肇星	Nonmember	Member	1940	1965	Alive	Shandong	Han	Male	
85	Li Yizhong	李毅中	Alternate	Member	1945	1980	Alive	Shanxi	Han	Male	
86	Yuan Shoufang	袁守芳	Nonmember	Alternate	1939	1962	Alive	Liaoning	Han	Male	
87	Nie Weiguo	聂卫国	Nonmember	Alternate	1952	1978	Alive	Chongqing	Han	Male	
88	Huang Jiefu	黄洁夫	Nonmember	Alternate	1946	1975	Alive	Jiangxi	Han	Male	
89	Chen Liangyu	陈良宇	Nonmember	Member	1946	1980	Alive	Zhejiang	Han	Male	
90	Chen Meifang	陈梅芳	Nonmember	Nonmember	1942	1966	Alive	Jiangxi	Han	Female	
91	Xu Penghang	徐鹏航	Nonmember	Nonmember	1940	1971	Alive	Hubei	Han	Male	
92	Lu Zhangong	卢展工	Nonmember	Member	1952	1975	Alive	Zhejiang	Han	Male	
93	Liu Jie	刘玠	Nonmember	Alternate	1943	1980	Alive	Anhui	Han	Male	
94	Liu Tinghuan	刘廷焕	Nonmember	Nonmember	1942	1973	Alive	Liaoning	Han	Male	
95	Xu Yongyue	许永跃	Nonmember	Nonmember	1942	1972	Alive	Henan	Han	Male	
96	Li Ke	李克	Nonmember	Alternate	1956	1975	Alive	Guangxi	Zhuang	Male	
97	Wang Ruzhen	王如珍	Alternate	Nonmember	1942	1980	Alive	Henan	Han	Female	
98	Qian Yunlu	钱运录	Alternate	Member	1944	1965	Alive	Hubei	Han	Male	
99	Huang Qingyi	黄晴宜	Nonmember	Member	1944	1966	Alive	Jiangsu	Han	Female	
100	Liu Haiyan	刘海燕	Nonmember	Nonmember	1941	1977	Alive	Shaanxi	Han	Male	
101	Wu Aiying	吴爱英	Alternate	Alternate	1951	1970	Alive	Shandong	Han	Female	
102	Ni Runfeng	倪润峰	Nonmember	Nonmember	1944	1967	Alive	Shandong	Han	Male	
103	Yu Zhen	于珍	Nonmember	Nonmember	1936	1956	Alive	Shandong	Han	Male	
104	Meng Jianzhu	孟建柱	Nonmember	Member	1947	1971	Alive	Jiangsu	Han	Male	
105	Gao Changli	高昌礼	Alternate	Nonmember	1937	1956	Alive	Shandong	Han	Male	
106	Bai Chunli	白春礼	Nonmember	Alternate	1953	1974	Alive	Liaoning	Manchu	Male	
107	Chen Yujie	陈玉杰	Alternate	Nonmember	1941	1961	Alive	Jilin	Han	Female	
108	Yue Xicui	岳喜翠	Nonmember	Alternate	1948	1966	Alive	Shandong	Han	Female	
109	Li Jiheng	李纪恒	Nonmember	Alternate	1957	1976	Alive	Guangxi	Han	Male	
110	Wu Quanxu	吴铨叙	Nonmember	Alternate	1939	1959	Alive	Jiangsu	Han	Male	
111	Keyum Bawudong	克尤木·巴吾东	Alternate	Nonmember	1939	1962	Alive	Xinjiang	Uyghur	Male	
112	Qiao Chuanxiu	乔传秀	Nonmember	Alternate	1954	1973	Alive	Anhui	Han	Female	
113	Du Yuxin	杜宇新	Nonmember	Alternate	1953	1976	Alive	Heilongjiang	Han	Male	
114	Luan Enjie	栾恩杰	Alternate	Nonmember	1940	1966	Alive	Liaoning	Manchu	Male	
115	Xiong Guangkai	熊光楷	Alternate	Alternate	1939	1959	Alive	Jiangxi	Han	Male	
116	Luo Baoming	罗保铭	Nonmember	Alternate	1952	1971	Alive	Tianjin	Han	Male	
117	Han Guizhi	韩桂芝	Nonmember	Nonmember	1943	1965	Alive	Heilongjiang	Han	Female	
118	Wu Guangyu	吴光宇	Alternate	Nonmember	1940	1964	Alive	Jiangsu	Han	Male	
119	Jin Yinhuan	金银焕	Nonmember	Nonmember	1952	1971	2008	Shanxi	Han	Female	
120	Jia Jun	贾军	Nonmember	Nonmember	1936	1956	Alive	Heilongjiang	Han	Male	
121	Guo Shuyan	郭树言	Alternate	Nonmember	1935	1957	2022	Henan	Han	Male	
122	Miao Helin	缪合林	Nonmember	Nonmember	1951	1972	Alive	Hubei	Han	Male	
123	Huang Huahua	黄华华	Nonmember	Member	1946	1971	Alive	Guangdong	Han	Male	
124	Jin Renqing	金人庆	Nonmember	Member	1944	1972	2021	Jiangsu	Han	Male	
125	Li Guoan	李国安	Nonmember	Nonmember	1946	1965	Alive	Sichuan	Han	Male	
126	Wu Yigong	吴贻弓	Alternate	Nonmember	1938	1985	2019	Zhejiang	Han	Male	
127	Li Zhijian	李志坚	Nonmember	Alternate	1940	1961	2016	Tianjin	Han	Male	
128	Wu Lianyuan	武连元	Nonmember	Nonmember	1937	1964	Alive	Jilin	Hui	Male	
129	Xia Baolong	夏宝龙	Nonmember	Alternate	1952	1973	Alive	Tianjin	Han	Male	
130	Wang Xudong	王旭东	Nonmember	Nonmember	1946	1972	Alive	Jiangsu	Han	Male	
131	Tao Jianxing	陶建幸	Nonmember	Alternate	1953	1974	Alive	Jiangsu	Han	Male	
132	Su Xintian	苏新添	Nonmember	Alternate	1943	1987	2025	Fujian	Han	Male	
133	Ou Guangyuan	欧广源	Alternate	Alternate	1948	1974	Alive	Guangdong	Han	Male	
134	Shen Yueyue	沈跃跃	Nonmember	Alternate	1957	1981	Alive	Zhejiang	Han	Female	
135	Wang Taihua	王太华	Alternate	Member	1945	1973	Alive	Jiangxi	Han	Male	
136	Zhou Zhengqing	周正庆	Nonmember	Nonmember	1935	1956	2018	Anhui	Han	Male	
137	Pei Huailiang	裴怀亮	Nonmember	Alternate	1941	1961	Alive	Shanxi	Han	Male	
138	Zhang Gaoli	张高丽	Nonmember	Member	1946	1973	Alive	Fujian	Han	Male	
139	Wang Chunzheng	王春正	Nonmember	Nonmember	1938	1972	Alive	Liaoning	Han	Male	
140	Ma Qizhi	马启智	Alternate	Member	1943	1972	Alive	Ningxia	Hui	Male	
141	Wang Gang	王刚	Nonmember	Member	1942	1971	Alive	Jilin	Han	Male	
142	Li Youwei	厉有为	Alternate	Nonmember	1938	1966	Alive	Liaoning	Han	Male	
143	Wu Jinyin	吴金印	Nonmember	Nonmember	1942	1960	Alive	Henan	Han	Male	
144	Wang Tailan	王太岚	Nonmember	Nonmember	1939	1959	2026	Shandong	Han	Male	
145	Wang Qishan	王岐山	Nonmember	Member	1948	1983	Alive	Shanxi	Han	Male	
146	You Xigui	由喜贵	Nonmember	Alternate	1939	1960	Alive	Hebei	Han	Male	
147	Liu Yandong	刘延东	Nonmember	Member	1945	1964	Alive	Jiangsu	Han	Female	
148	Wang Xuebing	王雪冰	Nonmember	Nonmember	1952	1985	Alive	Liaoning	Han	Male	
149	Yuan Weimin	袁伟民	Nonmember	Member	1939	1962	Alive	Jiangsu	Han	Male	
150	Deng Pufang	邓朴方	Nonmember	Alternate	1944	1965	Alive	Sichuan	Han	Male	
151	Xi Jinping	习近平	Nonmember	Member	1953	1974	Alive	Shaanxi	Han	Male	
