= Alternates of the 14th Central Committee of the Chinese Communist Party =

The 14th Central Committee of the Chinese Communist Party was elected by the 14th National Congress in 1992, with 130 individuals serving as alternates during this term.

== Alternates ==
Alternates of the 14th Central Committee of the Chinese Communist Party
Ballot	Name		13th CC	15th CC	Birth	PM	Death	Birthplace	Ethnicity	Gender	Ref.
1	Wang Xueping (Note: Wang Xueping was advanced from alternate to member of the 14th Central Committee to fill a vacant seat, by a decision of the 2nd Plenary Session of the 14th Central Committee, held on 5–7 March 1993.)	王学萍	Nonmember	Nonmember	1938	1956	Alive	Hainan	Li	Male	
2	Geng Quanli (Note: Geng Quanli was advanced from alternate to member of the 14th Central Committee to fill a vacant seat, by a decision of the 5th Plenary Session of the 14th Central Committee, held on 25–28 September 1995.)	耿全礼	Nonmember	Nonmember	1937	1958	Alive	Anhui	Han	Male	
3	Ma Qizhi (Note: Ma Qizhi was advanced from alternate to member of the 14th Central Committee to fill a vacant seat, by a decision of the 5th Plenary Session of the 14th Central Committee, held on 25–28 September 1995.)	马启智	Nonmember	Alternate	1943	1972	Alive	Ningxia	Hui	Male	
4	Sun Wensheng (Note: Sun Wensheng was advanced from alternate to member of the 14th Central Committee to fill a vacant seat, by a decision of the 6th Plenary Session of the 14th Central Committee, held on 7–10 October 1996.)	孙文盛	Alternate	Member	1942	1966	Alive	Shandong	Han	Male	
5	Keyum Bawudong (Note: Keyum Bawudong was advanced from alternate to member of the 14th Central Committee to fill a vacant seat, by a decision of the 7th Plenary Session of the 14th Central Committee, held on 6–9 September 1997.)	克尤木·巴吾东	Alternate	Alternate	1939	1962	Alive	Xinjiang	Uyghur	Male	
6	Wu Guangyu	吴光宇	Nonmember	Alternate	1940	1964	Alive	Jiangsu	Han	Male	
7	Zhao Jinduo	赵金铎	Nonmember	Alternate	1943	1979	Alive	Hebei	Manchu	Male	
8	Janabil	贾那布尔	Alternate	Nonmember	1934	1953	2024	Xinjiang	Kazakh	Male	
9	Sangyejia	桑结加	Nonmember	Alternate	1942	1972	Alive	Qinghai	Tibetan	Male	
10	Cao Bochun	曹伯纯	Nonmember	Member	1941	1966	Alive	Hunan	Han	Male	
11	Liang Guanglie	梁光烈	Alternate	Member	1940	1959	2024	Sichuan	Han	Male	
12	Wang Zhiwu	王志武	Alternate	Nonmember	1932	1956	Alive	Shaanxi	Han	Male	
13	Wang Luolin	王洛林	Alternate	Member	1938	1978	Alive	Hubei	Han	Male	
14	Jiangcun Luobu	江村罗布	Nonmember	Nonmember	1932	1956	Alive	Sichuan	Tibetan	Male	
15	Du Qinglin	杜青林	Nonmember	Member	1946	1966	Alive	Jilin	Han	Male	
16	Li Yizhong	李毅中	Nonmember	Alternate	1945	1980	Alive	Shanxi	Han	Male	
17	Wu Jichuan	吴基传	Nonmember	Member	1937	1960	Alive	Hunan	Han	Male	
18	Zhang Xiaowen	张孝文	Nonmember	Nonmember	1935	1955	Alive	Zhejiang	Han	Male	
19	Zhang Junjiu	张俊九	Nonmember	Member	1940	1964	Alive	Anhui	Han	Male	
20	Zheng Silin	郑斯林	Nonmember	Member	1940	1965	2022	Tianjin	Han	Male	
21	Qian Shugen	钱树根	Alternate	Member	1939	1956	Alive	Jiangsu	Han	Male	
22	Yan Haiwang	阎海旺	Nonmember	Member	1939	1966	Alive	Henan	Han	Male	
23	Tan Naida	谭乃达	Nonmember	Nonmember	1938	1961	Alive	Jilin	Han	Male	
24	Wang Yunlong	王云龙	Nonmember	Alternate	1945	1966	Alive	Shanxi	Han	Male	
25	Shi Zongyuan	石宗源	Nonmember	Alternate	1945	1979	2013	Hebei	Hui	Male	
26	Liu Zemin	刘泽民	Nonmember	Alternate	1944	1960	2017	Shanxi	Han	Male	
27	Yang Yongliang	杨永良	Alternate	Alternate	1944	1970	2012	Anhui	Han	Male	
28	Wu Yuqian	吴玉谦	Nonmember	Alternate	1943	1963	2016	Shandong	Han	Male	
29	Feng Henggao	奉恒高	Nonmember	Nonmember	1938	1956	2022	Guangxi	Yao	Male	
30	Jia Zhibang	贾治邦	Nonmember	Alternate	1946	1962	Alive	Shaanxi	Han	Male	
31	Gao Siren	高祀仁	Nonmember	Alternate	1944	1968	Alive	Shandong	Han	Male	
32	Guo Dongpo	郭东坡	Nonmember	Member	1937	1960	Alive	Jiangsu	Han	Male	
33	Huang Yao	黄瑶	Nonmember	Alternate	1948	1978	Alive	Guizhou	Buyi	Male	
34	Zeng Qingcun	曾庆存	Alternate	Nonmember	1935	1956	Alive	Guangdong	Han	Male	
35	Liao Wenhai	廖文海	Alternate	Nonmember	1934	1953	2009	Sichuan	Han	Female	
36	Wang Guangxian	王广宪	Nonmember	Alternate	1941	1973	Alive	Zhejiang	Han	Male	
37	Xu Qiliang	许其亮	Nonmember	Alternate	1950	1967	2025	Shandong	Han	Male	
38	Sun Tongchuan	孙同川	Alternate	Nonmember	1940	1970	Alive	Henan	Han	Male	
39	Wang Xiaofeng	汪啸风	Nonmember	Member	1944	1973	Alive	Hunan	Han	Male	
40	Shen Binyi	沈滨义	Nonmember	Nonmember	1944	1966	2023	Zhejiang	Han	Male	
41	Chen Mingyi	陈明义	Alternate	Member	1940	1960	Alive	Fujian	Han	Male	
42	Yue Haiyan	岳海岩	Nonmember	Alternate	1937	1956	2005	Liaoning	Han	Male	
43	Gong Gucheng	龚谷成	Nonmember	Alternate	1940	1958	Alive	Hunan	Han	Male	
44	Cheng Andong	程安东	Nonmember	Member	1936	1955	Alive	Anhui	Han	Male	
45	Tian Chengping	田成平	Nonmember	Member	1945	1964	Alive	Hebei	Han	Male	
46	Tang Honggao	汤洪高	Nonmember	Alternate	1939	1973	Alive	Shandong	Han	Male	
47	Sun Jiazheng	孙家正	Alternate	Member	1944	1966	Alive	Jiangsu	Han	Male	
48	Li Huifen	李慧芬	Alternate	Nonmember	1940	1961	Alive	Beijing	Han	Female	
49	Song Baorui	宋宝瑞	Nonmember	Member	1937	1958	2022	Beijing	Han	Male	
50	Zhang Yanzhong	张彦仲	Alternate	Nonmember	1940	1960	Alive	Shaanxi	Han	Male	
51	Hao Yan	郝岩	Nonmember	Nonmember	1938	1961	Alive	Hebei	Han	Male	
52	Chai Songyue	柴松岳	Nonmember	Member	1941	1961	Alive	Zhejiang	Han	Male	
53	Uyunqimg	乌云其木格	Nonmember	Alternate	1942	1966	2024	Liaoning	Mongolian	Female	
54	Liu Mingzu	刘明祖	Nonmember	Member	1936	1959	2022	Shandong	Han	Male	
55	Peng Kunsheng	彭昆生	Nonmember	Nonmember	1941	1973	Alive	Jiangxi	Han	Male	
56	Wen Zongren	温宗仁	Nonmember	Member	1940	1961	2008	Anhui	Han	Male	
57	Shi Zhaobin	石兆彬	Nonmember	Alternate	1945	1970	Alive	Fujian	Han	Male	
58	Liu Qi	刘淇	Nonmember	Member	1942	1975	Alive	Jiangsu	Han	Male	
59	Zhang Dejiang	张德江	Nonmember	Member	1946	1971	Alive	Liaoning	Han	Male	
60	Qin Yuqin	秦玉琴	Nonmember	Alternate	1943	1965	Alive	Shandong	Han	Female	
61	Gu Hao	顾浩	Nonmember	Nonmember	1940	1964	Alive	Jiangsu	Han	Male	
62	Qian Guoliang	钱国梁	Alternate	Member	1940	1960	2023	Jiangsu	Han	Male	
63	Wang Taihua	王太华	Nonmember	Alternate	1945	1973	Alive	Jiangxi	Han	Male	
64	Wang Lequan	王乐泉	Nonmember	Member	1944	1966	Alive	Shandong	Han	Male	
65	Shi Dazhen	史大桢	Alternate	Nonmember	1932	1978	2024	Jiangsu	Han	Male	
66	Bai Enpei	白恩培	Alternate	Member	1946	1973	Alive	Shaanxi	Han	Male	
67	Zhu Kaixuan	朱开轩	Alternate	Nonmember	1932	1953	2016	Shanghai	Han	Male	
68	Liu Zhenhua	刘振华	Nonmember	Alternate	1940	1974	Alive	Shandong	Han	Male	
69	Li Qisheng	李奇生	Nonmember	Nonmember	1940	1971	Alive	Jilin	Han	Male	
70	Li Shuzheng	李淑铮	Alternate	Nonmember	1929	1945	2024	Anhui	Han	Female	
71	Chen Yunlin	陈云林	Nonmember	Member	1941	1966	Alive	Liaoning	Han	Male	
72	Chen Yujie	陈玉杰	Alternate	Alternate	1941	1961	Alive	Jilin	Han	Female	
73	Wang Ruzhen	王如珍	Nonmember	Alternate	1942	1980	Alive	Henan	Han	Female	
74	Shi Yuzhen	石玉珍	Nonmember	Alternate	1947	1964	Alive	Hunan	Miao	Female	
75	Lu Ruihua	卢瑞华	Nonmember	Member	1938	1972	2025	Guangdong	Han	Male	
76	Zhu Lilan	朱丽兰	Nonmember	Member	1935	1956	Alive	Zhejiang	Han	Female	
77	Yang Jianqiang	杨健强	Nonmember	Alternate	1948	1975	Alive	Yunnan	Bai	Male	
78	Luan Enjie	栾恩杰	Alternate	Alternate	1940	1966	Alive	Liaoning	Manchu	Male	
79	Wang Siqi	王思齐	Nonmember	Nonmember	1940	1972	Alive	Anhui	Han	Male	
80	Liu Yunshan	刘云山	Nonmember	Member	1947	1966	Alive	Shanxi	Han	Male	
81	Li Chunting	李春亭	Nonmember	Member	1936	1958	2024	Shandong	Han	Male	
82	Zou Jingmeng	邹竞蒙	Alternate	Nonmember	1929	1948	1999	Shanghai	Han	Male	
83	Fan Qinchen	范钦臣	Nonmember	Alternate	1941	1960	Alive	Henan	Han	Male	
84	Luo Bingsheng	罗冰生	Nonmember	Nonmember	1940	1965	2022	Sichuan	Han	Male	
85	Danzeng	丹增	Alternate	Alternate	1946	1965	Alive	Tibet	Tibetan	Male	
86	Hui Liangyu	回良玉	Nonmember	Member	1944	1966	Alive	Jilin	Hui	Male	
87	Su Rong	苏荣	Nonmember	Alternate	1948	1974	Alive	Jilin	Han	Male	
88	Liu Yi	刘毅	Alternate	Nonmember	1930	1947	Alive	Shandong	Han	Male	
89	Zhang Xiao	张肖	Nonmember	Nonmember	1936	1980	Alive	Shaanxi	Han	Female	
90	Zhou Yongkang	周永康	Nonmember	Member	1942	1964	Alive	Jiangsu	Han	Male	
91	He Guoqiang	贺国强	Alternate	Member	1943	1966	Alive	Hunan	Han	Male	
92	Liu Fangren	刘方仁	Alternate	Member	1936	1954	Alive	Shaanxi	Han	Male	
93	Zhang Qiuxiang	张秋祥	Nonmember	Nonmember	1943	1961	Alive	Hebei	Han	Male	
94	Wang Mengkui	王梦奎	Nonmember	Member	1938	1956	Alive	Henan	Han	Male	
95	Zou Shichang	邹世昌	Nonmember	Nonmember	1931	1956	Alive	Shanghai	Han	Male	
96	Gao Changli	高昌礼	Nonmember	Alternate	1937	1956	Alive	Shandong	Han	Male	
97	Ru Xin	汝信	Nonmember	Nonmember	1931	1948	Alive	Jiangsu	Han	Male	
98	Jiang Yongrong	姜永荣	Nonmember	Nonmember	1944	1966	2002	Jiangsu	Han	Male	
99	Dai Xianglong	戴相龙	Nonmember	Member	1944	1973	Alive	Jiangsu	Han	Male	
100	Li Jiating	李嘉廷	Nonmember	Alternate	1944	1964	Alive	Yunnan	Yi	Male	
101	Sha Jiansun	沙健孙	Alternate	Nonmember	1934	1953	Alive	Jiangsu	Hui	Male	
102	Chen Zhili	陈至立	Alternate	Member	1942	1961	Alive	Fujian	Han	Female	
103	Qian Yunlu	钱运录	Nonmember	Alternate	1944	1965	Alive	Hubei	Han	Male	
104	Xu Kuangdi	徐匡迪	Nonmember	Member	1937	1983	Alive	Zhejiang	Han	Male	
105	Guo Shuyan	郭树言	Nonmember	Alternate	1935	1957	2022	Henan	Han	Male	
106	Li Jianguo	李建国	Nonmember	Member	1946	1969	Alive	Shandong	Han	Male	
107	Ou Guangyuan	欧广源	Nonmember	Alternate	1948	1974	Alive	Guangdong	Han	Male	
108	Li Youwei	厉有为	Nonmember	Alternate	1938	1966	Alive	Liaoning	Han	Male	
109	Liu Huaqiu	刘华秋	Nonmember	Member	1939	1965	2022	Guangdong	Han	Male	
110	Yang Zhenhuai	杨振怀	Nonmember	Nonmember	1928	1950	2024	Anhui	Han	Male	
111	Zeng Peiyan	曾培炎	Nonmember	Member	1938	1978	Alive	Zhejiang	Han	Male	
112	Li Ming	黎明	Alternate	Nonmember	1927	1948	2022	Tianjin	Han	Male	
113	Yu Zhengsheng	俞正声	Nonmember	Member	1945	1964	Alive	Zhejiang	Han	Male	
114	Zeng Xianlin	曾宪林	Alternate	Nonmember	1929	1947	Alive	Sichuan	Han	Male	
115	Tian Fengshan	田凤山	Nonmember	Member	1941	1970	Alive	Shandong	Han	Male	
116	Wang Zhan	王占	Nonmember	Alternate	1941	1965	Alive	Hebei	Han	Male	
117	Wu Aiying	吴爱英	Nonmember	Alternate	1951	1970	Alive	Shandong	Han	Female	
118	Zhao Yannian	赵延年	Alternate	Nonmember	1929	1950	2019	Henan	Hui	Male	
119	Wu Yigong	吴贻弓	Nonmember	Alternate	1938	1985	2019	Zhejiang	Han	Male	
120	Li Jinai	李继耐	Nonmember	Member	1942	1965	Alive	Shandong	Han	Male	
121	Zheng Xianbin	郑贤斌	Nonmember	Nonmember	1934	1953	2010	Anhui	Han	Male	
122	Gui Shiyong	桂世镛	Alternate	Member	1935	1956	2003	Zhejiang	Han	Male	
123	Xiong Guangkai	熊光楷	Nonmember	Alternate	1939	1959	Alive	Jiangxi	Han	Male	
124	Zhang Jianmin	张健民	Nonmember	Nonmember	1931	1952	Alive	Beijing	Manchu	Male	
125	Ma Zhongchen	马忠臣	Alternate	Member	1936	1956	2021	Shandong	Han	Male	
126	Lan Baojing	兰保景	Nonmember	Nonmember	1935	1953	Alive	Shanxi	Han	Male	
127	He Qizong	何其宗	Alternate	Nonmember	1943	1965	Alive	Sichuan	Han	Male	
128	Ye Qing	叶青	Nonmember	Nonmember	1933	1956	Alive	Jiangsu	Han	Male	
129	Fang Weizhong	房维中	Nonmember	Nonmember	1928	1950	2025	Liaoning	Han	Male	
130	Xiao Yang	肖秧	Nonmember	Nonmember	1929	1947	1998	Sichuan	Han	Male	
