= Alternates of the 16th Central Committee of the Chinese Communist Party =

The 16th Central Committee of the Chinese Communist Party was elected by the 16th National Congress in 2002, with 158 individuals serving as alternates during this term.

== Alternates ==
Alternates of the 16th Central Committee of the Chinese Communist Party
Ballot	Name		15th CC	17th CC	Birth	PM	Death	Birthplace	Ethnicity	Gender	Ref.
1	Aishaiti Kerimbai (Note: Aishaiti Kerimbai was advanced from alternate to member of the 16th Central Committee to fill a vacant seat by a decision of the 4th Plenary Session of the 16th Central Committee, held on 16–19 September 2004.)	艾斯海提·克里木拜	Alternate	Member	1947	1975	Alive	Xinjiang	Kazakh	Male	
2	Wang Zhengwei (Note: Wang Zhengwei was advanced from alternate to member of the 16th Central Committee to fill a vacant seat by a decision of the 4th Plenary Session of the 16th Central Committee, held on 16–19 September 2004.)	王正伟	Nonmember	Member	1957	1981	Alive	Ningxia	Hui	Male	
3	Zhu Zuliang (Note: Zhu Zuliang was advanced from alternate to member of the 16th Central Committee to fill a vacant seat by a decision of the 7th Plenary Session of the 16th Central Committee, held on 9–12 October 2007.)	朱祖良	Nonmember	Nonmember	1945	1965	Alive	Jiangsu	Han	Male	
4	Du Xuefang (Note: Du Xuefang was advanced from alternate to member of the 16th Central Committee to fill a vacant seat by a decision of the 7th Plenary Session of the 16th Central Committee, held on 9–12 October 2007.)	杜学芳	Nonmember	Nonmember	1949	1972	Alive	Hebei	Han	Female	
5	Yang Chuantang (Note: Yang Chuantang was advanced from alternate to member of the 16th Central Committee to fill a vacant seat by a decision of the 7th Plenary Session of the 16th Central Committee, held on 9–12 October 2007.)	杨传堂	Nonmember	Member	1954	1972	Alive	Shandong	Han	Male	
6	Qiu Yanhan (Note: Qiu Yanhan was advanced from alternate to member of the 16th Central Committee to fill a vacant seat by a decision of the 7th Plenary Session of the 16th Central Committee, held on 9–12 October 2007.)	邱衍汉	Nonmember	Nonmember	1944	1965	Alive	Hubei	Han	Male	
7	Zheng Lizhong	郑立中	Nonmember	Alternate	1951	1978	Alive	Fujian	Han	Male	
8	Wang Jun	王君	Nonmember	Member	1952	1977	Alive	Shanxi	Han	Male	
9	Zhu Zhixin	朱之鑫	Nonmember	Member	1949	1969	Alive	Zhejiang	Han	Male	
10	Quan Zhezhu	全哲洙	Alternate	Alternate	1952	1969	Alive	Jilin	Korean	Male	
11	Yang Limin	杨利民	Nonmember	Nonmember	1948	1981	Alive	Gansu	Han	Male	
12	Zhang Huazhu	张华祝	Alternate	Nonmember	1945	1965	Alive	Jiangsu	Han	Male	
13	Huang Yao	黄瑶	Alternate	Nonmember	1948	1978	Alive	Guizhou	Buyi	Male	
14	Peng Zuyi	彭祖意	Nonmember	Nonmember	1948	1974	Alive	Guangxi	Yao	Male	
15	Zhai Huqu	翟虎渠	Nonmember	Alternate	1950	1971	Alive	Jiangsu	Han	Male	
16	Wang Xia	王侠	Nonmember	Alternate	1954	1974	Alive	Shaanxi	Han	Female	
17	Zhi Shuping	支树平	Nonmember	Nonmember	1953	1974	Alive	Shanxi	Han	Male	
18	Liu Zemin	刘泽民	Alternate	Nonmember	1944	1960	2017	Shanxi	Han	Male	
19	Liu Dewang	刘德旺	Nonmember	Nonmember	1946	1969	Alive	Jiangxi	Han	Male	
20	Yang Jing	杨晶	Nonmember	Member	1953	1976	Alive	Inner Mongolia	Mongolian	Male	
21	Song Xiuyan	宋秀岩	Alternate	Member	1955	1978	Alive	Tianjin	Han	Female	
22	Zhang Baoshun	张宝顺	Nonmember	Member	1950	1971	Alive	Hebei	Han	Male	
23	Hu Yongzhu	胡永柱	Alternate	Nonmember	1944	1964	Alive	Sichuan	Han	Male	
24	Jiang Daming	姜大明	Nonmember	Member	1953	1976	Alive	Shandong	Han	Male	
25	Gao Zhongxing	高中兴	Alternate	Nonmember	1943	1964	2021	Qingdao	Han	Male	
26	Guo Gengmao	郭庚茂	Nonmember	Member	1950	1972	Alive	Hebei	Han	Male	
27	Huang Xuanping	黄选平	Nonmember	Nonmember	1955	1974	Alive	Gansu	Hui	Male	
28	Fu Guihua	符桂花	Nonmember	Nonmember	1948	1969	Alive	Hainan	Li	Female	
29	Guan Guozhong	管国忠	Alternate	Nonmember	1952	1978	Alive	Yunnan	Dai	Male	
30	Shi Yuzhen	石玉珍	Alternate	Nonmember	1947	1964	Alive	Hunan	Miao	Female	
31	Bai Chunli	白春礼	Alternate	Alternate	1953	1974	Alive	Liaoning	Manchu	Male	
32	Xiangba Pingcuo	向巴平措	Nonmember	Member	1947	1974	Alive	Tibet	Tibetan	Male	
33	Liu Qibao	刘奇葆	Nonmember	Member	1953	1974	Alive	Anhui	Han	Male	
34	Sun Shuyi	孙淑义	Alternate	Nonmember	1945	1971	Alive	Shandong	Han	Male	
35	Du Yuxin	杜宇新	Alternate	Alternate	1953	1976	Alive	Heilongjiang	Han	Male	
36	Li Jingtian	李景田	Nonmember	Member	1948	1971	Alive	Inner Mongolia	Manchu	Male	
37	Yang Yongmao	杨永茂	Nonmember	Nonmember	1947	1965	Alive	Heilongjiang	Han	Male	
38	Wu Yuqian	吴玉谦	Alternate	Nonmember	1943	1963	2016	Shandong	Han	Male	
39	Zhang Xiaozhong	张孝忠	Nonmember	Nonmember	1946	1965	Alive	Hubei	Han	Male	
40	Chen Ximing	陈希明	Nonmember	Nonmember	1946	1980	Alive	Beijing	Han	Female	
41	Lin Mingyue	林明月	Nonmember	Alternate	1947	1985	Alive	Taiwan	Han	Female	
42	Lin Shusen	林树森	Nonmember	Member	1946	1981	Alive	Guangdong	Han	Male	
43	Luo Zhengfu	罗正富	Nonmember	Alternate	1952	1974	Alive	Yunnan	Yi	Male	
44	Yue Fuhong	岳福洪	Nonmember	Alternate	1949	1972	Alive	Beijing	Han	Male	
45	Hu Biao	胡彪	Nonmember	Nonmember	1947	1966	Alive	Hunan	Han	Male	
46	Yuan Chunqing	袁纯清	Nonmember	Member	1952	1971	Alive	Hunan	Han	Male	
47	Liang Baohua	梁保华	Nonmember	Member	1945	1965	Alive	Jiangxi	Han	Male	
48	Wen Xisen	温熙森	Nonmember	Nonmember	1945	1966	Alive	Jiangsu	Han	Male	
49	Bai Jingfu	白景富	Nonmember	Member	1945	1973	Alive	Hebei	Han	Male	
50	Qiao Chuanxiu	乔传秀	Alternate	Nonmember	1954	1973	Alive	Anhui	Han	Female	
51	Liu Shiquan	刘石泉	Nonmember	Alternate	1963	1985	Alive	Hubei	Han	Male	
52	Li Ke	李克	Alternate	Member	1956	1975	Alive	Guangxi	Zhuang	Male	
53	Li Chuncheng	李春城	Nonmember	Nonmember	1956	1978	Alive	Liaoning	Han	Male	
54	Yang Yongliang	杨永良	Alternate	Nonmember	1944	1970	2012	Anhui	Han	Male	
55	Zhang Ping	張平	Nonmember	Nonmember	1946	1979	Alive	Anhui	Han	Male	
56	Zhang Xingxiang	张行湘	Nonmember	Nonmember	1945	1973	Alive	Shandong	Han	Male	
57	Chen Xunqiu	陈训秋	Nonmember	Nonmember	1955	1976	Alive	Hunan	Han	Male	
58	Luo Baoming	罗保铭	Alternate	Member	1952	1971	Alive	Tianjin	Han	Male	
59	Zhou Shengxian	周生贤	Nonmember	Member	1949	1972	Alive	Ningxia	Han	Male	
60	Yuan Shoufang	袁守芳	Alternate	Nonmember	1939	1962	Alive	Liaoning	Han	Male	
61	Nie Weiguo	聂卫国	Alternate	Member	1952	1978	Alive	Chongqing	Han	Male	
62	Li Zhanshu	栗战书	Nonmember	Alternate	1950	1975	Alive	Hebei	Han	Male	
63	Xu Shousheng	徐守盛	Nonmember	Member	1953	1973	2020	Jiangsu	Han	Male	
64	Ma Zhigeng	马之庚	Nonmember	Nonmember	1945	1971	Alive	Jiangsu	Han	Male	
65	Wang Mingfang	王明方	Nonmember	Alternate	1952	1974	2016	Heilongjiang	Han	Male	
66	Renqingjia	仁青加	Nonmember	Nonmember	1954	1975	2021	Qinghai	Tibetan	Male	
67	Long Xinmin	龙新民	Nonmember	Nonmember	1946	1973	Alive	Hunan	Han	Male	
68	Simayi Tiliwaldi	司马义·铁力瓦尔地	Nonmember	Member	1944	1973	Alive	Xinjiang	Uyghur	Male	
69	Zhu Fazhong	朱发忠	Nonmember	Alternate	1948	1971	Alive	Gansu	Han	Male	
70	Liu Peng	刘鹏	Nonmember	Member	1951	1979	Alive	Chongqing	Han	Male	
71	Sun Gan	孙淦	Nonmember	Nonmember	1946	1980	Alive	Jiangsu	Han	Male	
72	Li Changyin	李长印	Nonmember	Alternate	1951	1974	Alive	Shaanxi	Han	Male	
73	Wu Qidi	吴启迪	Nonmember	Nonmember	1947	1978	Alive	Zhejiang	Han	Female	
74	Wu Xinxiong	吴新雄	Nonmember	Member	1949	1979	Alive	Jiangsu	Han	Male	
75	Song Airong	宋爱荣	Nonmember	Alternate	1959	1981	Alive	Henan	Han	Female	
76	Fan Changlong	范长龙	Nonmember	Member	1947	1969	Alive	Liaoning	Han	Male	
77	Yue Xicui	岳喜翠	Alternate	Nonmember	1948	1966	Alive	Shandong	Han	Female	
78	Huang Xingguo	黄兴国	Nonmember	Alternate	1954	1973	Alive	Zhejiang	Han	Male	
79	Cao Jianming	曹建明	Nonmember	Member	1955	1973	Alive	Jiangsu	Han	Male	
80	Xie Qihua	谢企华	Alternate	Nonmember	1943	1966	Alive	Zhejiang	Han	Female	
81	Pei Huailiang	裴怀亮	Alternate	Nonmember	1941	1961	Alive	Shanxi	Han	Male	
82	Liu Yungeng	刘云耕	Nonmember	Nonmember	1947	1973	Alive	Zhejiang	Han	Male	
83	Sun Zhongtong	孙忠同	Nonmember	Member	1944	1965	Alive	Shandong	Han	Male	
84	Du Shicheng (Note: Du Shicheng was found guilty of corruption in December 2006. Following deliberation by the Standing Committee of the 16th Central Commission for Discipline Inspection, his removal as an alternate of the 16th Central Committee was proposed to the 16th Politburo. The Politburo adopted the recommendation in April 2007, pending subsequent confirmation by the 16th Central Committee at its next plenary session. The decision was then ratified ex post by the 7th Plenary Session of the 16th Central Committee, held on 9–12 October 2007.)	杜世成	Nonmember	Nonmember	1950	1972	Alive	Shandong	Han	Male	
85	Li Chengyu	李成玉	Nonmember	Member	1946	1971	Alive	Ningxia	Hui	Male	
86	Shen Yueyue	沈跃跃	Alternate	Member	1957	1981	Alive	Zhejiang	Han	Female	
87	Zhang Wenyue	张文岳	Nonmember	Member	1944	1965	Alive	Fujian	Han	Male	
88	Ou Guangyuan	欧广源	Alternate	Nonmember	1948	1974	Alive	Guangdong	Han	Male	
89	Ou Zegao	欧泽高	Alternate	Nonmember	1947	1981	Alive	Sichuan	Tibetan	Male	
90	Xia Baolong	夏宝龙	Alternate	Alternate	1952	1973	Alive	Tianjin	Han	Male	
91	Xi Zhongchao	息中朝	Nonmember	Alternate	1947	1966	Alive	Hebei	Han	Male	
92	Jiang Wenlan	蒋文兰	Nonmember	Nonmember	1948	1980	Alive	Jiangsu	Han	Female	
93	Xie Xuren	谢旭人	Nonmember	Member	1947	1980	Alive	Zhejiang	Han	Male	
94	Xue Yanzhong	薛延忠	Nonmember	Alternate	1954	1981	Alive	Shanxi	Han	Male	
95	Wang Qian	王谦	Nonmember	Nonmember	1946	1969	Alive	Hebei	Han	Male	
96	Ye Xiaowen	叶小文	Nonmember	Alternate	1950	1975	Alive	Chongqing	Han	Male	
97	Zhu Chengyou	朱成友	Alternate	Nonmember	1941	1961	Alive	Liaoning	Han	Male	
98	Li Jiheng	李纪恒	Alternate	Alternate	1957	1976	Alive	Guangxi	Han	Male	
99	Wu Aiying	吴爱英	Alternate	Member	1951	1970	Alive	Shandong	Han	Female	
100	Wu Quanxu	吴铨叙	Alternate	Nonmember	1939	1959	Alive	Jiangsu	Han	Male	
101	Min Weifang	闵维方	Nonmember	Alternate	1950	1970	Alive	Heilongjiang	Han	Male	
102	Jiang Yikang	姜异康	Nonmember	Member	1953	1969	Alive	Shandong	Han	Male	
103	Wang Sanyun	王三运	Nonmember	Alternate	1952	1979	Alive	Shandong	Han	Male	
104	Liu Jie	刘玠	Alternate	Nonmember	1943	1980	Alive	Anhui	Han	Male	
105	Wu Dingfu	吴定富	Nonmember	Alternate	1946	1972	Alive	Hubei	Han	Male	
106	Zhang Li	張黎	Nonmember	Nonmember	1943	1966	Alive	Shandong	Han	Male	
107	Zhu Yanfeng	竺延风	Nonmember	Alternate	1961	1982	Alive	Zhejiang	Han	Male	
108	Xi Guohua	奚国华	Nonmember	Nonmember	1951	1980	Alive	Shanghai	Han	Male	
109	Guo Shengkun	郭声琨	Nonmember	Alternate	1954	1973	Alive	Jiangxi	Han	Male	
110	Ding Yiping	丁一平	Nonmember	Alternate	1951	1970	Alive	Hunan	Han	Male	
111	Liu Mingkang	刘明康	Nonmember	Member	1946	1988	Alive	Shanghai	Han	Male	
112	Chen Shaoji	陈绍基	Nonmember	Nonmember	1945	1978	Alive	Guangdong	Han	Male	
113	Zhou Tongzhan	周同战	Nonmember	Nonmember	1945	1971	Alive	Hebei	Han	Male	
114	Wei Liucheng	卫留成	Nonmember	Member	1946	1973	Alive	Henan	Han	Male	
115	Li Yuanchao	李源潮	Nonmember	Member	1950	1968	Alive	Jiangsu	Han	Male	
116	Shang Fulin	尚福林	Nonmember	Member	1951	1971	Alive	Shandong	Han	Male	
117	Jiang Jianqing	姜建清	Nonmember	Alternate	1953	1983	Alive	Shanghai	Han	Male	
118	Pan Yunhe	潘云鹤	Nonmember	Alternate	1946	1974	Alive	Zhejiang	Han	Male	
119	Ma Fucai	马富才	Nonmember	Nonmember	1946	1975	Alive	Jiangsu	Han	Male	
120	Wang Zhengfu	王正福	Alternate	Nonmember	1947	1984	Alive	Guizhou	Miao	Male	
121	Zhu Wenquan	朱文泉	Nonmember	Nonmember	1942	1964	Alive	Jiangsu	Han	Male	
122	Sun Chunlan	孙春兰	Alternate	Member	1950	1969	Alive	Hebei	Han	Female	
123	Lin Zuoming	林左鸣	Nonmember	Alternate	1957	1981	Alive	Fujian	Han	Male	
124	Wang Jiarui	王家瑞	Nonmember	Member	1949	1973	Alive	Hebei	Han	Male	
125	Lü Zushan	吕祖善	Nonmember	Member	1946	1966	Alive	Zhejiang	Han	Male	
126	Liu Yuping	刘玉浦	Nonmember	Alternate	1949	1971	Alive	Shandong	Han	Male	
127	Liu Yuejun	刘粤军	Nonmember	Alternate	1954	1972	Alive	Shandong	Han	Male	
128	Li Hongzhong	李鸿忠	Nonmember	Alternate	1956	1976	Alive	Shandong	Han	Male	
129	Yang Jiechi	杨洁篪	Nonmember	Member	1950	1971	Alive	Shanghai	Han	Male	
130	Qin Guangrong	秦光荣	Alternate	Member	1950	1972	Alive	Hunan	Han	Male	
131	Tao Jianxing	陶建幸	Alternate	Nonmember	1953	1974	Alive	Jiangsu	Han	Male	
132	Wang Mingquan	王明权	Nonmember	Nonmember	1947	1977	Alive	Hubei	Han	Male	
133	Shi Dahua	石大华	Nonmember	Alternate	1951	1969	Alive	Hubei	Han	Male	
134	Shi Lianxi	史莲喜	Nonmember	Alternate	1952	1974	Alive	Hebei	Han	Female	
135	Huang Jiefu	黄洁夫	Alternate	Nonmember	1946	1975	Alive	Jiangxi	Han	Male	
136	Shu Xiaoqin	舒晓琴	Nonmember	Alternate	1956	1977	Alive	Jiangxi	Han	Female	
137	Su Xintian	苏新添	Alternate	Nonmember	1943	1987	2025	Fujian	Han	Male	
138	Zhang Xuan	张轩	Nonmember	Alternate	1958	1979	Alive	Hebei	Han	Female	
139	Du Deyin	杜德印	Nonmember	Nonmember	1951	1974	Alive	Beijing	Han	Male	
140	Yin Yicui	殷一璀	Nonmember	Alternate	1950	1973	Alive	Zhejiang	Han	Female	
141	Wang Yang	汪洋	Nonmember	Member	1955	1975	Alive	Anhui	Han	Male	
142	Tie Ning	铁凝	Nonmember	Alternate	1957	1975	Alive	Hebei	Han	Female	
143	Qiu Xueqiang	邱学强	Nonmember	Nonmember	1957	1980	Alive	Shandong	Han	Male	
144	Zhang Ruimin	张瑞敏	Nonmember	Alternate	1949	1976	Alive	Shandong	Han	Male	
145	Li Zhijian	李志坚	Alternate	Nonmember	1940	1961	2016	Tianjin	Han	Male	
146	Ji Bingxuan	吉炳轩	Nonmember	Member	1951	1980	Alive	Henan	Han	Male	
147	Zhang Dingfa (Note: Zhang Dingfa died of natural causes on 14 December 2006.)	张定发	Alternate	Nonmember	1943	1964	2006	Shanghai	Han	Male	
148	Qiang Wei	强卫	Nonmember	Member	1953	1975	Alive	Jiangsu	Han	Male	
149	Xiong Guangkai	熊光楷	Alternate	Nonmember	1939	1959	Alive	Jiangxi	Han	Male	
150	Ling Jihua	令计划	Nonmember	Member	1956	1973	Alive	Shanxi	Han	Male	
151	San Xiangjun	散襄军	Nonmember	Nonmember	1954	1975	Alive	Hebei	Han	Male	
152	Xu Zhigong	许志功	Nonmember	Nonmember	1945	1966	Alive	Hebei	Han	Male	
153	Chen Yuan	陈元	Nonmember	Alternate	1945	1975	Alive	Jiangsu	Han	Male	
154	Deng Pufang	邓朴方	Alternate	Nonmember	1944	1965	Alive	Sichuan	Han	Male	
155	Su Shulin	苏树林	Nonmember	Alternate	1962	1985	Alive	Shandong	Han	Male	
156	Huang Liman	黄丽满	Nonmember	Nonmember	1945	1964	Alive	Liaoning	Han	Female	
157	Wang Luolin	王洛林	Member	Nonmember	1938	1978	Alive	Hubei	Han	Male	
158	You Xigui	由喜贵	Alternate	Nonmember	1939	1960	Alive	Hebei	Han	Male	
