= 2002 in China =

- Decades: 1980s; 1990s; 2000s; 2010s; 2020s
- See also: Other events of 2002; History of China • Timeline • Years

Events in the year 2002 in China.

== Incumbents ==
- General Secretary of the Chinese Communist Party - Jiang Zemin until November 15, Hu Jintao
- President – Jiang Zemin
- Premier – Zhu Rongji
- Vice President – Hu Jintao
- Vice Premier – Li Lanqing
- Congress Chairman - Li Peng
- Conference Chairman - Li Ruihuan

=== Governors ===
- Governor of Anhui Province – Xu Zhonglin then Wang Jinshan
- Governor of Fujian Province – Xi Jinping then Lu Zhangong
- Governor of Gansu Province – Lu Hao
- Governor of Guangdong Province – Lu Ruihua
- Governor of Guizhou Province – Shi Xiushi
- Governor of Hainan Province – Wang Xiaofeng
- Governor of Hebei Province – Niu Maosheng then Ji Yunshi
- Governor of Heilongjiang Province – Song Fatang
- Governor of Henan Province – Li Keqiang
- Governor of Hubei Province – Luo Qingquan
- Governor of Hunan Province – Zhang Yunchuan
- Governor of Jiangsu Province – Ji Yunshi then Liang Baohua
- Governor of Jiangxi Province – Huang Zhiquan
- Governor of Jilin Province – Hong Hu
- Governor of Liaoning Province – Bo Xilai
- Governor of Qinghai Province – Zhao Leji
- Governor of Shaanxi Province – Jia Zhibang
- Governor of Shandong Province – Han Yuqun
- Governor of Shanxi Province – Yu Youjun
- Governor of Sichuan Province – Zhang Zhongwei
- Governor of Yunnan Province – Xu Rongkai
- Governor of Zhejiang Province – Chai Songyue (until October), Xi Jinping (starting October)

== Events ==
=== March ===
- March 25 – Shenzhou 3, an unmanned Chinese spacecraft, was launched.

=== April ===
- April 15 – An Air China Boeing 767-200 crashes into a hillside during heavy rain and fog near Pusan, South Korea, killing 129.

=== June ===
- June - Discovery of the Hidden character stone (est.)

=== July ===
- July 19 – Hail kills 25 and injures hundreds in the Chinese province of Henan.

=== August ===
- August 22 – In China, the Dongting Lake floods Yueyang, forcing the evacuation of 600,000 people; the crest of the flooding from the Yangtze River is expected Sunday. Floods and landslides have killed nearly 1000 people in China, 200 in the Hunan province.

=== November ===
- November 8 – President of the People's Republic of China Jiang Zemin announced several key policies at the 16th National Congress of the Chinese Communist Party in Beijing. Although Marxism-Leninism would remain the official ideology of China, entrepreneurs and people in unconventional occupations, who are building "socialism with Chinese characteristics", would have a voice in establishing Communist Party ideology.
- November 15 – Hu Jintao becomes General Secretary of the Chinese Communist Party.

=== December ===
- December 29
  - China successfully launches Shenzhou 4, the fourth unmanned launch of the Chinese Shenzhou spacecraft.
  - China State Grid, a largest utility brand of world, was established.

=== Date unknown ===
- Ynhanfu organization is founded in Kunming, Yunnan Province.

== Births ==
- November 6 - Giulio Taccon, musician and actor

== See also ==
- List of Chinese films of 2002
- Hong Kong League Cup 2002–03
