= Wang Guosheng =

Wang Guosheng may refer to:

- Wang Guosheng (general): general of the People's Liberation Army
- Wang Guosheng (politician): governor of Hubei province
