= Zhiqiang =

Zhiqiang is a Chinese given name. Notable people with the given name include:

- Chi Zhiqiang (池志强; 1924–2020), Chinese pharmacologist and researcher at Shanghai Institute of Materia Medica, Chinese Academy of Sciences
- He Zhiqiang (和志强; 1934–2007), People's Republic of China politician
- Wong Chi-keung (黃志強; 1936–2000), Taiwanese footballer
- Sun Zhiqiang (孙志强; born 1944), a lieutenant general in the People's Liberation Army of China
- Chow Chee Keong (仇志強; 1948–2018), Malaysian footballer
- Ren Zhiqiang (任志强; born 1951), incarcerated Chinese real estate tycoon, blogger on Sina Weibo with more than 37 million followers
- Lu Zhiqiang (卢志强; born 1952), Chinese businessman
- Wan Chi Keung (尹志強; 1956–2010), Hong Kong footballer, actor and businessman
- Jack Neo (梁智强; born 1960), Singaporean filmmaker, comedian and actor
- Wu Zhiqiang (engineer) (吴志强; born 1960), Chinese engineer who is a counsellor for Shanghai Municipal Government
- Xu Zhiqiang (许志强; born 1963), former male Chinese gymnast
- Hu Zhiqiang (胡志强; born 1963) (born 1963), former Chinese politician
- Han Zhiqiang (韩志强; born 1963), Chinese diplomat currently serving as Chinese ambassador to Thailand
- Pu Zhiqiang (浦志强; born 1965), Chinese civil rights lawyer specializing in press freedom, defamation, product safety
- Lo Chih-chiang (羅智強; born 1970), Taiwanese politician and a member of the Kuomintang
- Ahronglong Sakinu (戴志强; born 1972), Taiwanese indigenous Paiwan writer and forest hunter
- Zhu Zhiqiang (朱志强; born 1976), Chinese graphic designer, animator, writer, producer, voice actor
- Zhang Zhiqiang (rugby union) (张志强; born 1978), Chinese rugby union player who plays at the fly-half position
- Yan Zhiqiang (born 1987), Chinese paralympic boccia player
- Fan Zhiqiang (范志强; born 1988), Chinese footballer
- Zhang Zhiqiang (speed skater) (born 1988), Chinese short track speed skater
- Feng Zhiqiang (冯志强; born 1998), Chinese hurdler and sprinter
- Teng Zhiqiang (滕志强; born 1991), Chinese male slalom canoeist who competed at the international level from 2005 to 2013
- Wu Zhiqiang (吴志强; born 1994), Chinese sprinter

== See also ==
- Zhiqian
