= Gu Xiangbing =

- 顾祥兵

Deputy Commander of the Eastern Theater Command
- Incumbent
- Assumed office January 2016
- Commander: Liu Yuejun; He Weidong

Personal details
- Born: February 1959 (age 67) Qidong County, Jiangsu, China
- Party: Chinese Communist Party

Military service
- Allegiance: People's Republic of China
- Branch/service: People's Liberation Army Navy
- Years of service: 1978–present
- Rank: Vice admiral

Chinese name
- Simplified Chinese: 顾祥兵
- Traditional Chinese: 顧祥兵
Transcriptions
Standard Mandarin
- Hanyu Pinyin: Gù Xiángbīng

Gu Xiangbing (Chinese: 顾祥兵; born February 1959) is a vice admiral (zhongjiang) of the People's Liberation Army (PLA), serving as deputy commander of the Eastern Theater Command since January 2016. He is a delegate to the 13th National People's Congress.

== Biography ==
Gu was born in Qidong County, Jiangsu, in February 1959. He enlisted in the People's Liberation Army in 1978. In December 2008, he rose to become deputy chief of staff of the North Sea Fleet. In December 2009, he was appointed president of PLA Navy Submarine Academy, succeeding Wei Xueyi. In July 2011, he became deputy commander of the East Sea Fleet, and held that office until January 2016, when he was commissioned as deputy commander of the Eastern Theater Command.

He was promoted to the rank of rear admiral (Shaojiang) in July 2010 and vice admiral (zhongjiang) in July 2017.

Military offices
Preceded by Wei Xueyi (魏学义)	President of PLA Navy Submarine Academy; 2009–2012	Succeeded by Zhi Tianlong (支天龙)
