= Bai Jingfu =

Chinese politician (1945–2026)

Bai Jingfu (Chinese language: 白景富; Hanyu Pinyin: Bái Jǐngfù; July 1945 – 29 April 2026) was a Chinese politician. He graduated from Jilin University in 1970. Jingfu was a executive deputy minister of the Ministry of Public Security of the People's Republic of China, and its deputy Party secretary. He was an alternate member of the 16th Central Committee of the Chinese Communist Party and a member of the 17th Central Committee of the Chinese Communist Party. Bai died on 29 April 2026, at the age of 80.
