= Tang Tianbiao =

General in the People's Liberation Army of China

- 唐天标

Deputy Head of the People's Liberation Army General Political Department
- In office 1995–2005
- Head: Yu Yongbo; Xu Caihou; Li Jinai

Personal details
- Born: October 1940 (age 85–86) Shimen County, Hunan, China
- Party: Chinese Communist Party
- Education: Harbin Military Academy of Engineering; Central Party School of the Chinese Communist Party

Military service
- Allegiance: People's Republic of China
- Branch/service: People's Liberation Army Ground Force; People's Liberation Army Navy (1992–1993)
- Years of service: 1960–2005
- Rank: General

Chinese name
- Simplified Chinese: 唐天标
- Traditional Chinese: 唐天標
Transcriptions
Standard Mandarin
- Hanyu Pinyin: Tang Tianbiao

Tang Tianbiao (Chinese: 唐天标; born October 1940) is a general in the People's Liberation Army of China. He was a member of the 15th and 16th Central Committee of the Chinese Communist Party. He was a delegate to the 9th and 10th National People's Congress and a member of the Standing Committee of the 11th National People's Congress.

== Biography ==
Tang was born in Shimen County, Hunan, in October 1940. He enlisted in the People's Liberation Army (PLA) in July 1960, and joined the Chinese Communist Party (CCP) in December 1961. In 1961, he entered Harbin Military Academy of Engineering (now National University of Defense Technology), majoring in the Engineering Department. After graduating in 1966, he was assigned to the Guangzhou Military Region, one of the PLA Military Regions. In May 1988, he was dispatched to the People's Liberation Army General Political Department and appointed deputy head of Cadre Bureau. He moved up the ranks to become executive assistant in June 1993 and deputy head in 1995. He also served as deputy director the PLA Navy Political Department from for a short year in 1992. In December 2005, he took office as vice chairperson of the National People's Congress Agriculture and Rural Affairs Committee, a position he held until March 2008, when he was chosen as vice chairperson of the National People's Congress Education, Science, Culture and Public Health Committee.

He was promoted to the rank of major general (shaojiang) in 1988, lieutenant general (zhongjiang) in 1995, and general (shangjiang) in 2000.
