= Li Dongheng =

Chinese lieutenant general and politician

- 李栋恒

Deputy Political Commissioner of the People's Liberation Army General Armaments Department
- In office December 2003 – August 2006
- Political Commissioner: Chi Wanchun

Personal details
- Born: July 1944 (age 82) Neixiang County, Henan, China
- Party: Chinese Communist Party
- Education: Shanghai Jiao Tong University

Military service
- Allegiance: People's Republic of China
- Branch/service: People's Liberation Army Ground Force
- Years of service: 1968–2006
- Rank: Lieutenant general

Chinese name
- Simplified Chinese: 李栋恒
- Traditional Chinese: 李棟恆
Transcriptions
Standard Mandarin
- Hanyu Pinyin: Lǐ Dònghéng

Li Dongheng (Chinese: 李栋恒; born July 1944) is a retired lieutenant general in the People's Liberation Army of China. He was a member of the 16th Central Committee of the Chinese Communist Party. He was a member of the Standing Committee of the 11th Chinese People's Political Consultative Conference.

== Biography ==
Li was born in Neixiang County, Henan, in July 1944. After graduating from Shanghai Jiao Tong University in 1968, he enlisted in the People's Liberation Army (PLA). He served in the People's Liberation Army Ground Force between March 1970 and November 1983. After working in the People's Liberation Army General Political Department for about three years, he was appointed director of Political Department of the 39th Group Army in July 1986. In June 1990, he became deputy political commissioner, rising to political commissioner in February 1993. In April 1996, he became director of Political Department of the People's Armed Police, he remained in that position until December 2003, when he was chosen as deputy political commissioner of the People's Liberation Army General Armaments Department and deputy secretary of the Discipline Inspection Commission of the Central Military Commission.

He was promoted to the rank of lieutenant general (zhongjiang) in December 2003.
