= Shi Xiushi =

Chinese politician

- 石秀诗

Governor of Guizhou
- In office January 2001 – June 2006
- Party Secretary: Qian Yunlu; Shi Zongyuan
- Preceded by: Qian Yunlu
- Succeeded by: Lin Shusen

Personal details
- Born: July 1942 (age 84) Shangqiu County, Henan, China
- Party: Chinese Communist Party
- Education: Beijing University of Civil Engineering and Architecture

Chinese name
- Simplified Chinese: 石秀诗
- Traditional Chinese: 石秀詩
Transcriptions
Standard Mandarin
- Hanyu Pinyin: Shí Xiùshī

Shi Xiushi (Chinese: 石秀诗; born July 1942) is a Chinese politician who served as governor of Guizhou from 2001 to 2006.

He was a member of the Standing Committee of the 10th and 11th National People's Congress. He was a member of the 16th Central Committee of the Chinese Communist Party.

== Biography ==
Shi was born in Shangqiu County (now Shangqiu), Henan, in July 1942. In 1959, he was accepted to Beijing University of Civil Engineering and Architecture, majoring in glass ceramic technology. After graduation in 1964, he was despatched to the Academy of Building Materials Science, where he worked for 16 years.

Shi joined the Chinese Communist Party (CCP) in November 1978. He was deputy director and engineer of the Building Materials Department of Heavy Industry Bureau of the State Economic Commission in November 1980, and held that office until June 1986, when he was appointed director of the Tourism Coordination Group Office of the State Council. In May 1988, he became deputy director of the Second Bureau of the Secretary General of the General Office of the State Council, rising to director in July 1993. He rose to deputy secretary-general of the State Council in August 1996.

He was appointed deputy party secretary of Guizhou in December 2000, concurrently holding the governor position since January 2001.

In June 2006, he took office as vice chairperson of the National People's Congress Financial and Economic Affairs Committee, and served until March 2013.

Government offices
Preceded by Qian Yunlu	Governor of Guizhou; 2001–2006	Succeeded by Lin Shusen
