= Chen Chuankuo =

Chinese military official

- 陈传阔

Deputy Commander of the People's Armed Police
- In office December 2003 – January 2009
- Commander: Wu Shuangzhan

Personal details
- Born: October 1945 (age 80) Huainan, Anhui, China
- Party: Chinese Communist Party
- Education: PLA National Defence University

Military service
- Allegiance: People's Republic of China
- Branch/service: People's Liberation Army Ground Force (1970–1985); People's Armed Police (1993–2009)
- Years of service: 1970–2009
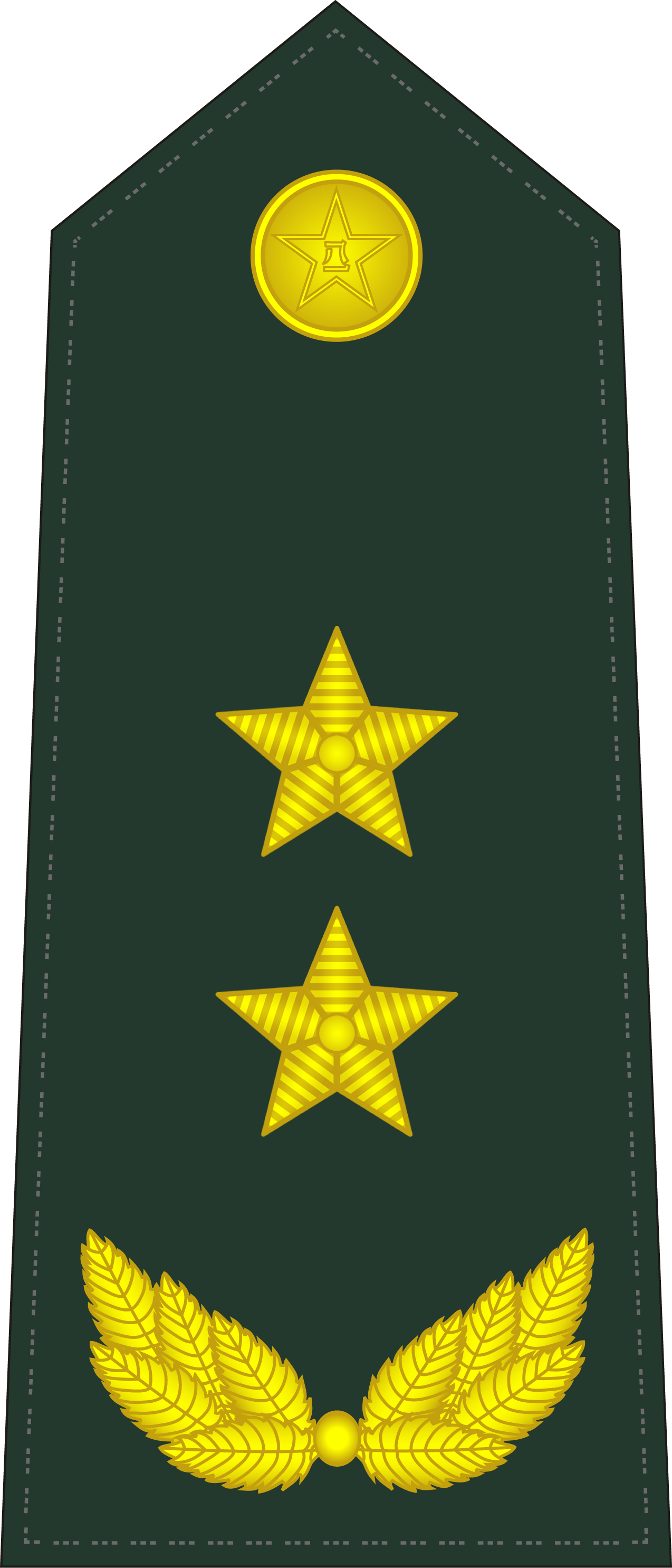
- Rank: Lieutenant general

Chinese name
- Simplified Chinese: 陈传阔
- Traditional Chinese: 陳傳闊
Transcriptions
Standard Mandarin
- Hanyu Pinyin: Chén Chuánkuò

Chen Chuankuo (Chinese: 陈传阔; born October 1945) is a lieutenant general in the People's Liberation Army of China. He was a member of the 16th Central Committee of the Chinese Communist Party and a member of the Standing Committee of the 11th Chinese People's Political Consultative Conference.

== Biography ==
Chen was born in Huainan, Anhui, in October 1945. He secondary studied at Huainan No. 2 High School. He joined the Chinese Communist Party (CCP) in January 1966, and enlisted in the People's Liberation Army (PLA) in January 1970. He served in the Central Guard Regiment from 1970 to 1978 and the People's Liberation Army General Staff Department from 1978 to 1993. In April 1993, he became deputy chief of staff of the People's Armed Police, rising to chief of staff in December 1999. He was commissioned as deputy commander in December 2003, serving in the post until his retirement in January 2009.

He was promoted to the rank of major general (shaojiang) in September 1994 and lieutenant general (zhongjiang) in July 2001.
