= Li Qianyuan =

Chinese general

- 李乾元

Commander of the Lanzhou Military Region
- In office September 1999 – June 2007
- Preceded by: Guo Boxiong
- Succeeded by: Wang Guosheng

Chief of Staff of the Lanzhou Military Region
- In office December 1994 – April 1999
- Preceded by: Qian Shugen
- Succeeded by: Zheng Shouzeng

Personal details
- Born: 12 March 1942 (age 84) Lin County, Henan, China
- Party: Chinese Communist Party
- Education: Zhongyuan University of Technology; PLA Military Academy; PLA National Defence University

Military service
- Allegiance: People's Republic of China
- Branch/service: People's Liberation Army Ground Force
- Years of service: 1961–2007
- Rank: General
- Battles/wars: Sino-Vietnamese War

Li Qianyuan (Chinese: 李乾元; pinyin: Lǐ Qiányuán; born 12 March 1942) is a general (shangjiang) of the People's Liberation Army (PLA). He a member of the Standing Committee of the 11th National People's Congress. He was a member of the 13th and 16th Central Committee of the Chinese Communist Party and an alternate member of the 14th and 15th Central Committee of the Chinese Communist Party.

== Biography ==
Li was born in the town of Yaocun, in Lin County (now Linzhou), Henan, on 12 March 1942. In 1959, he entered Zhengzhou Textile Machinery College (now Zhongyuan University of Technology), and joined the Communist Youth League of China in the same year. He enlisted in the People's Liberation Army (PLA) in July 1961, and joined the Chinese Communist Party (CCP) in May 1963. After graduating from the PLA Military Academy in 1982, he was assigned to chief of staff of a PLA Division. In 1983, he was commissioned as deputy chief of staff of the 1st Group Army, taking part in the Sino-Vietnamese War. As a result of his distinguished service at the war, he was promoted to commander of the 1st Group Army, replacing Fu Quanyou. In July 1990, he became deputy chief of staff of the Guangzhou Military Region, a position he held until December 1994, when he was promoted to chief of staff of the Lanzhou Military Region. In April 1999, he became deputy commander of the Lanzhou Military Region, rising to commander five months later. He retired in June 2007 and Wang Guosheng was promoted to commander in his plac. In March 2008, he was appointed vice chairperson of the National People's Congress Agricultural and Rural Affairs Committee.

He was promoted to the rank of major general (shaojiang) in September 1988, lieutenant general (zhongjiang) in 1996 and general (shangjiang) in June 2004.

== Personal life ==
His younger brother Li Guangyuan (李广元) is a businessman and politician.

== Publication ==
- 西进战略 [Westward Strategy] (in Chinese). Beijing: People's Publishing House. 2010. ISBN 9787010091273.

Military offices
Preceded by Qian Shugen	Chief of Staff of the Lanzhou Military Region; 1994–1999	Succeeded by Zheng Shouzeng
Preceded by Guo Boxiong	Commander of the Lanzhou Military Region; 1999–2007	Succeeded by Wang Guosheng
