= Zhang Dinghua =

Chinese politician (1933–2021)

- 张丁华

First Secretary of Secretariat of the All-China Federation of Trade Unions
- In office December 1991 – October 1998
- Preceded by: Yu Hong'en
- Succeeded by: Zhang Junjiu

Personal details
- Born: June 1933 Shaan County, Henan, China
- Died: 25 January 2021 (aged 87) Beijing, China
- Party: Chinese Communist Party
- Education: Northwest University; China University of Petroleum

Chinese name
- Simplified Chinese: 张丁华
- Traditional Chinese: 張丁華
Transcriptions
Standard Mandarin
- Hanyu Pinyin: Zhāng Dīnghuá

Zhang Dinghua (Chinese: 张丁华; June 1933 – 25 January 2021) was a Chinese politician who served as first secretary of Secretariat of the All-China Federation of Trade Unions from 1991 to 1998.

He was a representative of the 13th, 14th, and 15th National Congress of the Chinese Communist Party. He was a member of the 14th and 15th Central Committee of the Chinese Communist Party. He was a member of the Standing Committee of the 9th and 10th National People's Congress.

== Biography ==
Zhang was born in Shaan County (now Shanzhou District of Sanmenxia), Henan, in June 1933. He secondary studied at the Xi'an Middle School of Shaanxi Province. In 1951, he entered Northwest University, majoring in Russian language. After graduation, he became an interpreter in the Ministry of Fuel Industry and then Ministry of Petroleum Industry.

In 1955, he was admitted to the China University of Petroleum, majoring in petroleum geology. He joined the Chinese Communist Party (CCP) in March 1956. In 1956, he was sent to the Qaidam Basin in northwest China to explore for oil, and was transferred to Shengli Oil Field in east China's Shandong province in 1964. In 1966, the Cultural Revolution broke out, he forced to work in oil fields but later reinstated in 1970.

Since 1979, he participated in the construction of Dagang Oil Field and once served as the deputy commander-in-chief of the oilfield construction headquarters. In June 1983, he was promoted to party secretary of Dagang Petroleum Administration Bureau, the top political position in the bureau.

Zhang was appointed head of the Publicity Department of CCP Tianjin Municipal Committee and secretary of the CCP Tianjin Municipal Commission for Discipline Inspection in October 1985 and was admitted to member of the Standing Committee of the CCP Tianjin Municipal Committee, the city's top authority.

He was appointed deputy party secretary of Inner Mongolia in April 1988, concurrently serving as president of the regional party school.

He became vice chairperson of the All-China Federation of Trade Unions and first secretary of its Secretariat in December 1991, and served until October 1998.

In December 1998, he took office as vice chairperson of the National People's Congress Supervisory and Judicial Affairs Committee. He retired in September 2009.

On 25 January 2021, he died from an illness in Beijing, at the age of 87.

Party political offices
Preceded by Yu Hong'en	First Secretary of Secretariat of the All-China Federation of Trade Unions; 1998–2005	Succeeded by Zhang Junjiu
