= Zhang Junjiu =

Chinese politician (born 1940)

- 张俊九

First Secretary of Secretariat of the All-China Federation of Trade Unions
- In office October 1998 – December 2005
- Preceded by: Zhang Dinghua
- Succeeded by: Sun Chunlan

Personal details
- Born: August 1940 (age 86) Funan County, Anhui, China
- Party: Chinese Communist Party
- Education: Beijing Institute of Technology

Chinese name
- Simplified Chinese: 张俊九
- Traditional Chinese: 張俊九
Transcriptions
Standard Mandarin
- Hanyu Pinyin: Zhāng Jùnjiǔ

Zhang Junjiu (Chinese: 张俊九; born August 1940) is a Chinese politician. He was an alternate member of the 14th Central Committee of the Chinese Communist Party and a member of the 15th and 16th Central Committee of the Chinese Communist Party. He was a member of the Standing Committee of the 10th and 11th Chinese People's Political Consultative Conference.

== Biography ==
Zhang was born in Funan County, Anhui, in August 1940. In 1961, he entered Beijing Institute of Technology, majoring in tank design. He joined the Chinese Communist Party (CCP) in November 1964. After university in 1968, he was assigned to the Fifth Ministry of Machine Building. In 1982, he became deputy factory director of the 617 Factory of the Ministry of Ordnance Industry, rising to factory director in 1984. In 1988, he became deputy general manager of China North Industries Group (CNGC), but having held the position for only two years. He served as deputy general manager of China North Industries Corporation in 1990, and three years later promoted to the general manager position. In March 1998, he was appointed deputy director of the Commission for Science, Technology and Industry for National Defense, a post he kept only ten months. In January 1999, he was chosen as vice president and party branch secretary of the All-China Federation of Trade Unions, concurrently serving as first secretary of its secretariat.

Party political offices
Preceded by Zhang Dinghua	First Secretary of Secretariat of the All-China Federation of Trade Unions; 1998–2005	Succeeded by Sun Chunlan
