= Wang Luolin =

Chinese economist, educator and politician (1938–2026)

- 王洛林

Communist Party Secretary of Xiamen University
- In office September 1989 – April 1994
- President: Tian Zhaowu; Lin Zugeng
- Preceded by: Wu Xuangong
- Succeeded by: Ye Pinqiao

Personal details
- Born: June 1938 Wuchang, Hubei, China
- Died: 26 June 2026 (aged 88)
- Party: Chinese Communist Party
- Parent: Wang Yanan
- Education: Peking University

Wang Luolin (Chinese: 王洛林; pinyin: Wáng Luòlín; June 1938 – 26 June 2026) was a Chinese economist, educator and politician who served as party secretary of Xiamen University between 1989 and 1994.

Wang was an alternate member of the 13th Central Committee of the Chinese Communist Party, 14th Central Committee of the Chinese Communist Party and 16th Central Committee of the Chinese Communist Party, and a member of the 15th Central Committee of the Chinese Communist Party. He was a delegate to the 9th and 10th National People's Congress.

== Life and career ==
Wang was born in Wuchang (now Wuchang District of Wuhan), Hubei, in June 1938, to Wang Yanan, an economist. In 1960, he graduated from the Department of Economics, Peking University. Starting in 1961, he successively served as lecturer, associate professor, and full professor of Xiamen University. He was appointed vice president in 1984, concurrently serving as party secretary since 1989. In 1993, he was appointed vice president of the Chinese Academy of Social Sciences.

Wang died on 26 June 2026, at the age of 88.

== Publications ==
- 日本金融考察报告 [Japan's Financial Situation] (in Chinese). Beijing: Social Science Literature Press. 2001. ISBN 9787801496010.
- 减轻经济全球化中的健康脆弱性 [Reducing Health Vulnerability: A Case Study from Rural China] (in Chinese). Beijing: Economic Management Press. 2008. ISBN 9787509601013.
- 中国服务业开放与发展：特点与区域分析 [The Opening and Development of China's Service Industry: Characteristics and Regional Analysis] (in Chinese). Beijing: Economic Management Press. 2009. ISBN 9787509607466.
- 全球化：服务外包与中国的政策选择 [Globalization: Service Outsourcing and China's Policy Option] (in Chinese). Beijing: Economic Management Press. 2010. ISBN 9787509608227.
- 全球化与中国农村发展 [Globalization and China's Rural Development] (in Chinese). Beijing: Economic Management Press. 2010. ISBN 9787509616437.
- 全球化与中国金融 [China Financial Reform under Globalization] (in Chinese). Beijing: Economic Management Press. 2010. ISBN 9787509609248.
- 全球化背景下的中国法治建设 [China's Construction of the Rule of Law in the Context of Globalization] (in Chinese). Beijing: Economic Management Press. 2010. ISBN 9787509609231.
- 全球化与中国：理论与发展趋势 [Globalization and China: Theories and Trends] (in Chinese). Beijing: Economic Management Press. 2010. ISBN 9787509608630.
- 本土全球化：当代中国西部的社会文化变迁 [Globalization Sociocultural Changes in Contemporary Western China] (in Chinese). Beijing: Economic Management Press. 2011. ISBN 9787509615034.
- 加入WTO十年后的中国 [China: Ten Years after WTO Accession] (in Chinese). Beijing: China Development Press. 2012. ISBN 9787802347816.
- 宏观经济效应及前景分析 [China's Macroeconomic Effectiveness and its Prospect] (in Chinese). Beijing: Economic Management Press. 2013. ISBN 9787509627419.

Party political offices
Preceded by Wu Xuangong	Communist Party Secretary of Xiamen University; 1989–1994	Succeeded by Ye Pinqiao
