= Zheng Wantong =

Chinese male politician

Zheng Wantong (Chinese: 郑万通, born April 1941) is a Chinese male politician, who was the vice chairperson of the 11th National Committee of the Chinese People's Political Consultative Conference.

== Career Data ==
2008—2013	Vice-chairman, 11th CPPCC, National Committee	§
2003—2008	Secretary-General, 10th CPPCC, National Committee	
	(Co-Editor, Tianjin Open to the World)	
2002—2007	Member, 16th CPC, Central Committee	
2001—	Vice-president, Chinese Research Association for Economy and Society, 1st Council	
1998—2003	Secretary-General, 9th CPPCC, National Committee	
1997—????	Vice-president, China Overseas Friendship Association	
1997—1998	Vice-chairman, All-China Federation of Industry and Commerce, Executive Committee	
1993—1998	Deputy Secretary-General, 8th CPPCC, National Committee	
1993—1998	Deputy Head, CPC, Central Committee, United Front Work Department	
1988—1993	Vice-chairman, All-China Federation of Trade Unions, Executive Committee	
1988—1993	Member, All-China Federation of Trade Unions, Secretariat	
	Guest Research Fellow, Tianjin Academy of Social SciencesTianjin Municipality	
1983—1988	Secretary-General, CPC, Municipal Committee Tianjin Municipality	
1982—1983	Director, CPC, District Committee, General Office Tianjin, Hebei District	
1974—1978	Deputy Head, CPC, District Committee, Publicity DepartmentTianjin, Hebei District	
1970—1974	Cadre, CPC, District Committee, Publicity Department Tianjin, Hebei District	
1968—1970	Worker, Cultural Revolution, May 7 Cadre School Tianjin, Hebei District	
1965—1968	Head, CYLC, District-Level, School Work Department Tianjin, Hebei District	
1961—1965	Teacher, Tianjin Municipality (No.78 Middle School)	
1961	Graduate, Tianjin Teachers' College, Chinese Language Department Tianjin Municipality	
1960	Joined, CPC	
