= Wang Guosheng (general) =

- 王国生

Commander of the Lanzhou Military Region
- In office June 2007 – October 2012
- Preceded by: Li Qianyuan
- Succeeded by: Liu Yuejun

Chief of Staff of the Lanzhou Military Region
- In office December 2003 – June 2007
- Preceded by: Chang Wanquan
- Succeeded by: Liu Yuejun

Personal details
- Born: February 1947 (age 79) Da'an, Jilin, China
- Party: Chinese Communist Party

Military service
- Allegiance: People's Republic of China
- Branch/service: People's Liberation Army Ground Force
- Years of service: 1968–2012
- Rank: General

Chinese name
- Simplified Chinese: 王国生
- Traditional Chinese: 王國生
Transcriptions
Standard Mandarin
- Hanyu Pinyin: Wáng Guóshēng

Wang Guosheng (Chinese: 王国生; born February 1947) is a retired general of the People's Liberation Army (PLA) of China. He served as commander of the Lanzhou Military Region.

== Biography ==
Born in Da'an, Jilin Province, Wang joined the PLA in February 1968. He then served as chief of staff of the 40th Group Army. In December 2001, he was elevated to commander of the 40th Army. He became the chief of staff of the Lanzhou Military Region in December 2003, and was promoted to commander of the Lanzhou MR in June 2007.

Wang attained the rank of major general in 1998, lieutenant general in 2005, and full general in 2010. He was a member of the 17th Central Committee of the Chinese Communist Party. He retired from active military service in 2012.

Military offices
| Preceded by Yang Fuchen (杨福臣) | Commander of the 40th Group Army; 2001–2003 | Succeeded by Hou Jizhen |
| Preceded by Chang Wanquan | Chief of Staff of the Lanzhou Military Region; 2003–2007 | Succeeded by Liu Yuejun |
| Preceded by Li Qianyuan | Commander of the Lanzhou Military Region; 2007–2012 | Succeeded by Liu Yuejun |
