= Ynhanfu =

- Formation: 2007; 19 years ago
- Founded at: Kunming, China
- Purpose: China traditional Culture rebirth
- Website: Ynhanfu

Ynhanfu is an organization, working in researching and promoting traditional Chinese clothing Hanfu, which was founded in Kunming, Yunnan Province, China in 2002. The goal of Ynhanfu is to promote Chinese traditional clothing hanfu to the society. Ynhanfu only had eight members at the very beginning.

== Cultural activities ==
Ynhanfu promotes Chinese culture, traditional clothing to the community, also held a lot of major Chinese traditional festivals celebrations in Kunming: the traditional Dragon Boat Festival, Tanabata Festival, and Mid-Autumn Festival. At the same time the traditional Chinese ritual activities: Worship of Confucius, weddings, mitzvahs and the beginning ceremony. And Yunnan also gives lectures of Chinese culture, Hanfu in many University.

== Social welfare ==
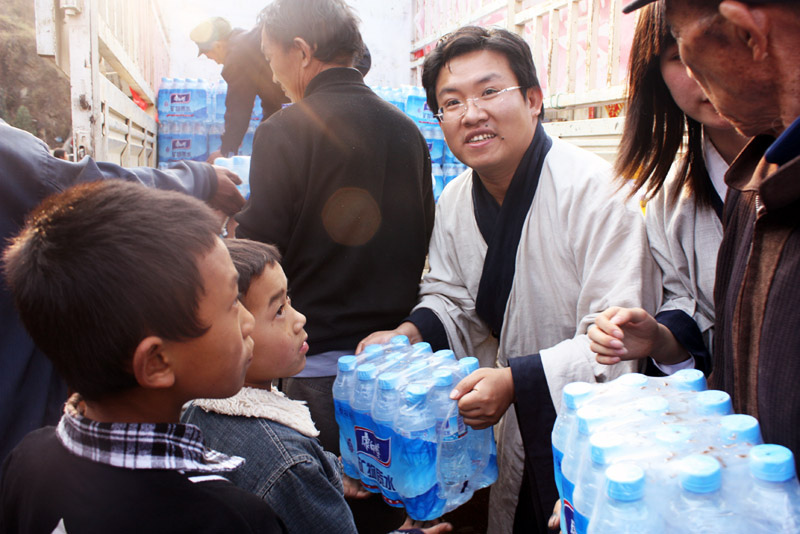
"Chuxiong Nan Hua contributions of mineral water " (2010) by Xiaoyaozi Liu

Ynhanfu donations clothing and medicines to children in China earthquake, also transports a large number of drinking water in arid regions, Funding student groups to do the traditional cultural activities.

== Film shooting ==
In February 2010, Ynhanfu shot a historical drama "Seoul Xue Wang".
