= Liu Yuejun =

General Liu Yuejun
- 刘粤军
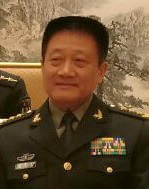
- Liu Yuejun in 2016

Commander of the Eastern Theater Command
- In office February 2016 – December 2019
- Preceded by: New title
- Succeeded by: He Weidong

Commander of the Lanzhou Military Region
- In office October 2012 – January 2016
- Preceded by: Wang Guosheng
- Succeeded by: Position revoked

Commander of the People's Liberation Army Macao Garrison
- In office April 1999 – February 2002
- Preceded by: New title
- Succeeded by: Liu Lianhua

Personal details
- Born: September 1954 (age 72) Guangdong, China
- Party: Chinese Communist Party
- Education: Central Party School of the Chinese Communist Party; PLA National Defence University

Military service
- Allegiance: People's Republic of China
- Branch/service: People's Liberation Army Ground Force
- Years of service: 1969–2019
- Rank: General
- Commands: Lanzhou Military Region (2012–2016); Eastern Theater Command (2016–2019)
- Battles/wars: Sino-Vietnamese War

Chinese name
- Simplified Chinese: 刘粤军
- Traditional Chinese: 劉粵軍
Transcriptions
Standard Mandarin
- Hanyu Pinyin: Liú Yuèjūn
Yue: Cantonese
- Jyutping: Lau^{4} Jyut^{6}-gwan^{1}

Liu Yuejun (Chinese: 刘粤军; born September 1954) is a general (shangjiang) of the People's Liberation Army (PLA) of China who served as commander of the Eastern Theater Command from 2016 to 2019.

== Biography ==
Liu traces his ancestry to Rongcheng, Shandong, but he was born in Guangdong, where both of his parents were serving in the military. His given name, Yuejun, literally means "Guangdong army". He joined the army when he was 14 years old. He joined the 41st Army. In 1989 he became the chief of general staff of the 91st division of the 41st army. In 1993 he took charge of the Shenzhen preparatory force of the Hong Kong Garrison; he then successively led the 121st and 123rd divisions. In October 1998 he was named chief of general staff of the 41st Group Army. In April 1999 he became the commander of the Macao Garrison. In June 2007 he became the chief of general staff of the Lanzhou Military Region. He was promoted to lieutenant-general in July 2008. In October 2012 he was named commander of the Lanzhou Military Region.

On 31 July 2015, Liu Yuejun was promoted to general (shang jiang), the highest rank for Chinese military officers in active service. On February 1, 2016, Liu was named commander of the reorganized Eastern Theater Command.

In August 2020, he was appointed vice chairperson of the National People's Congress Social Development Affairs Committee.

Liu was an alternate of the 16th and 17th Central Committee of the Chinese Communist Party, and is a full member of the 18th and 19th Central Committees.

Military offices
New title	Commander of the People's Liberation Army Macao Garrison; 1999–2002	Succeeded by Liu Lianhua
Preceded by Wang Guosheng	Commander of the Lanzhou Military Region; 2012–2016	Succeeded by Position revoked
New title	Commander of the Eastern Theater Command; 2016–2019	Succeeded by He Weidong
