= Zhongyuan University of Technology =

University in Zhengzhou, Henan, China

Coordinates: 34.5859°N 113.6884°E

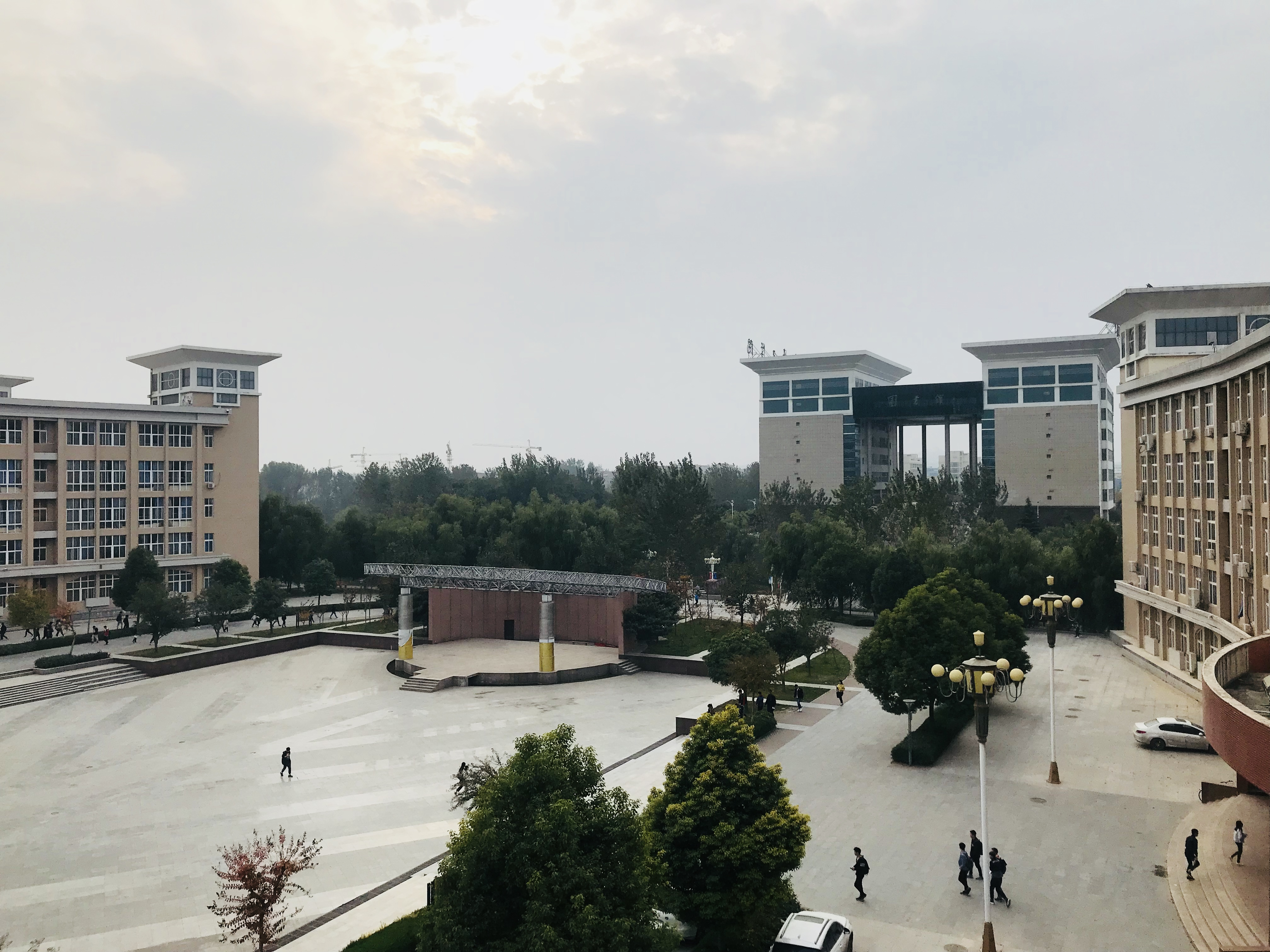

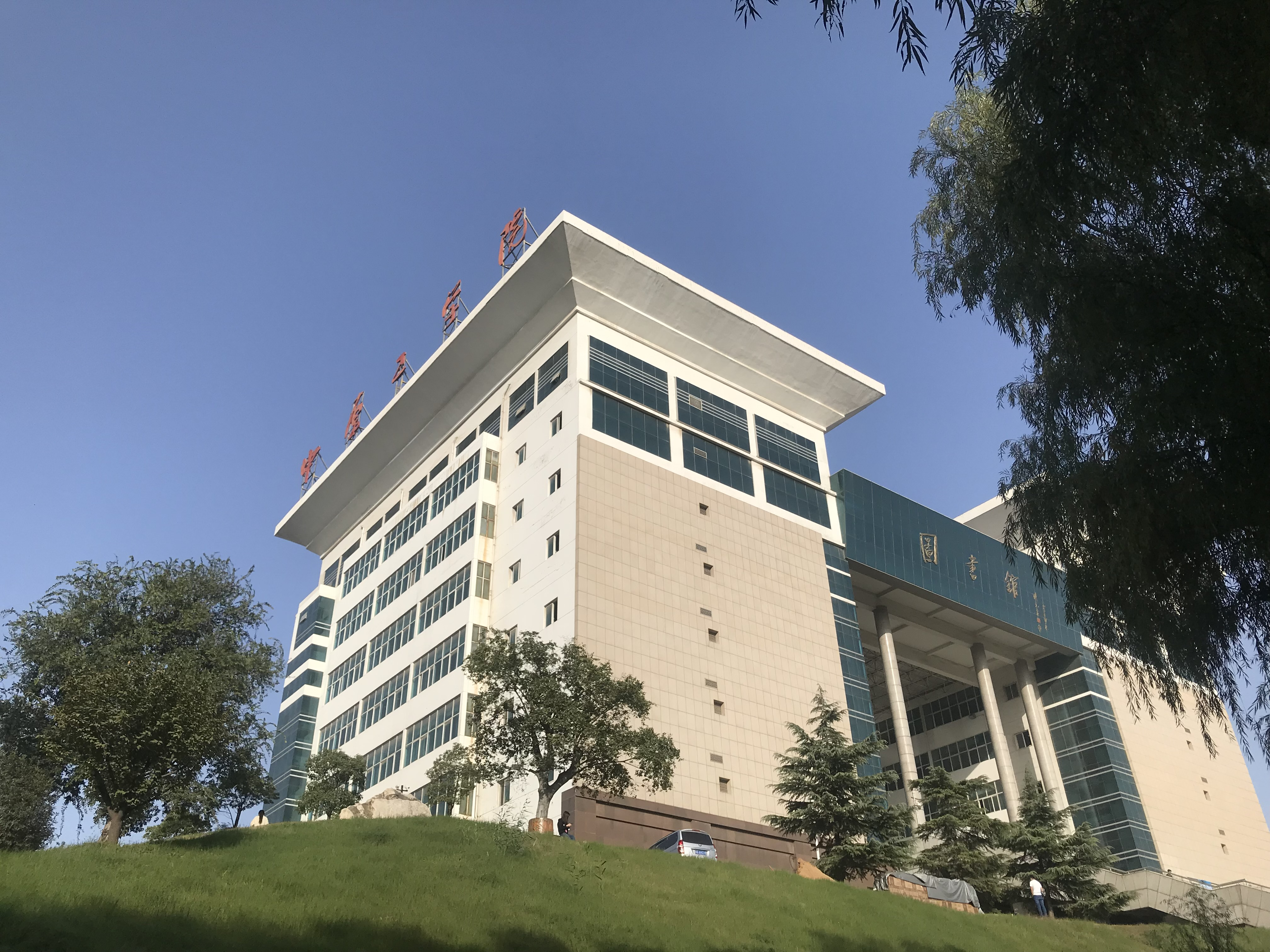

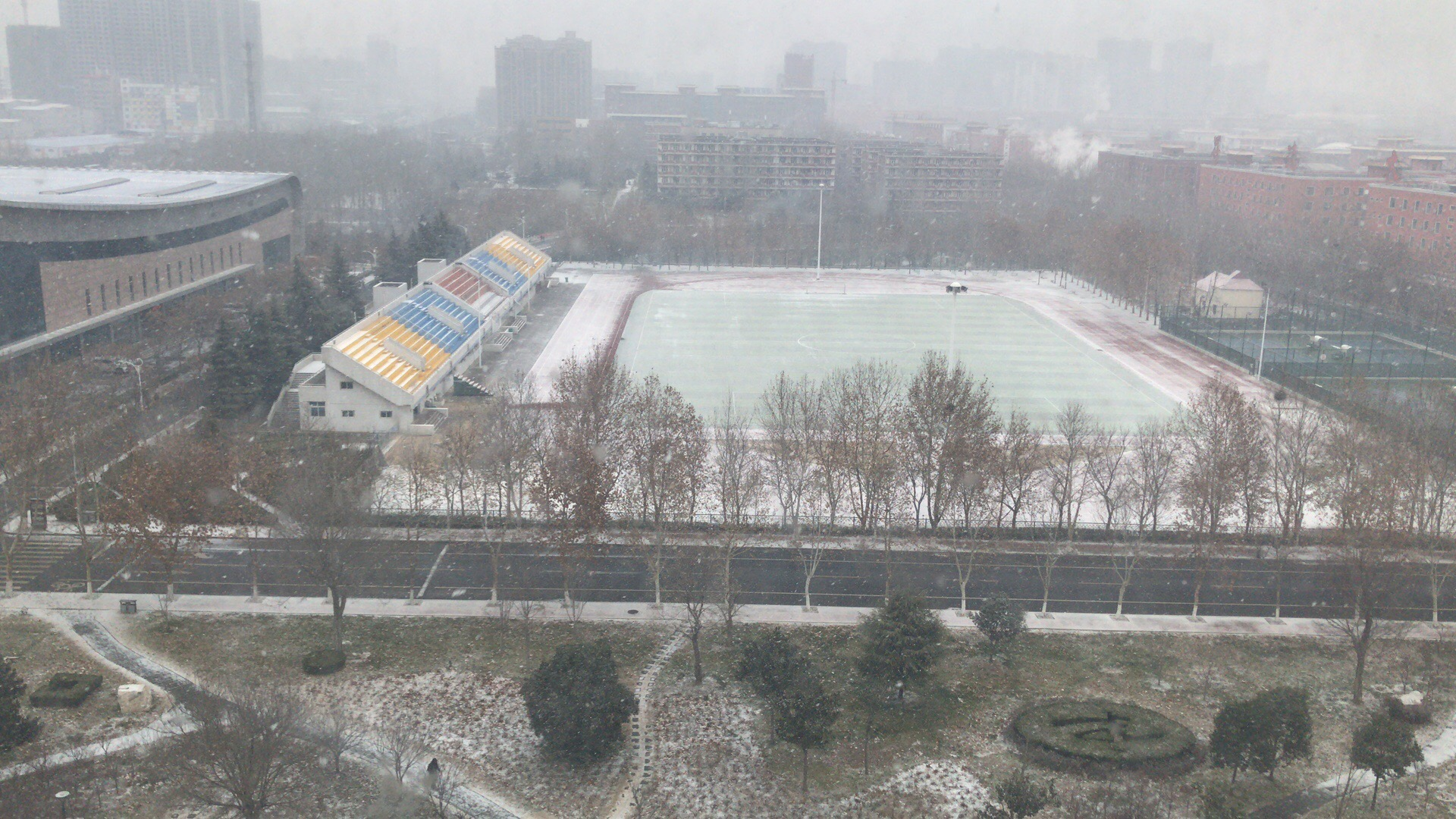

Zhongyuan University of Technology (Simplified Chinese: 中原工学院 Zhōngyuán gōng xuéyuàn), formerly Zhengzhou Textile Institute (ZITT) (郑州纺织学院 Zhèngzhōu fǎngzhī xuéyuàn), is a public university in Zhengzhou, Henan province, China. It has three campuses: central, south, and west.

It has 22,000 full-time students and 1,942 faculty members.

== History ==
ZUT, the former ZITT, has presently evolved into a multi-disciplinary university focusing on engineering, featuring textiles and clothing, and promoting coordinated development of such disciplines as engineering, management, liberal arts, sciences, economics, and law. Since its foundation in 1955, ZITT has been supervised by the Ministry of Textile Industry until it was transferred to Henan Province in September 1998, in accordance with the principle of "jointly supervised by central and local authorities, mainly by the local authorities". In July 2000, ZITT was renamed Zhongyuan University of Technology.

== Campuses and Schools ==
ZUT has three campuses: central, south and west that are composed of 20 teaching schools and departments:

- School of Automation and Electrical Engineering
- College of Textiles
- School of Energy & Environment
- School of Mechanical & Electronic Engineering
- College of Fashion Technology
- School of Art and Design
- School of Electronic and Information
- School of Economics and Management
- School of Journalism & Communication
- Law School/Intellectual Property School
- School of Marxism
- School of Materials & Chemical Engineering
- School of Computer Science
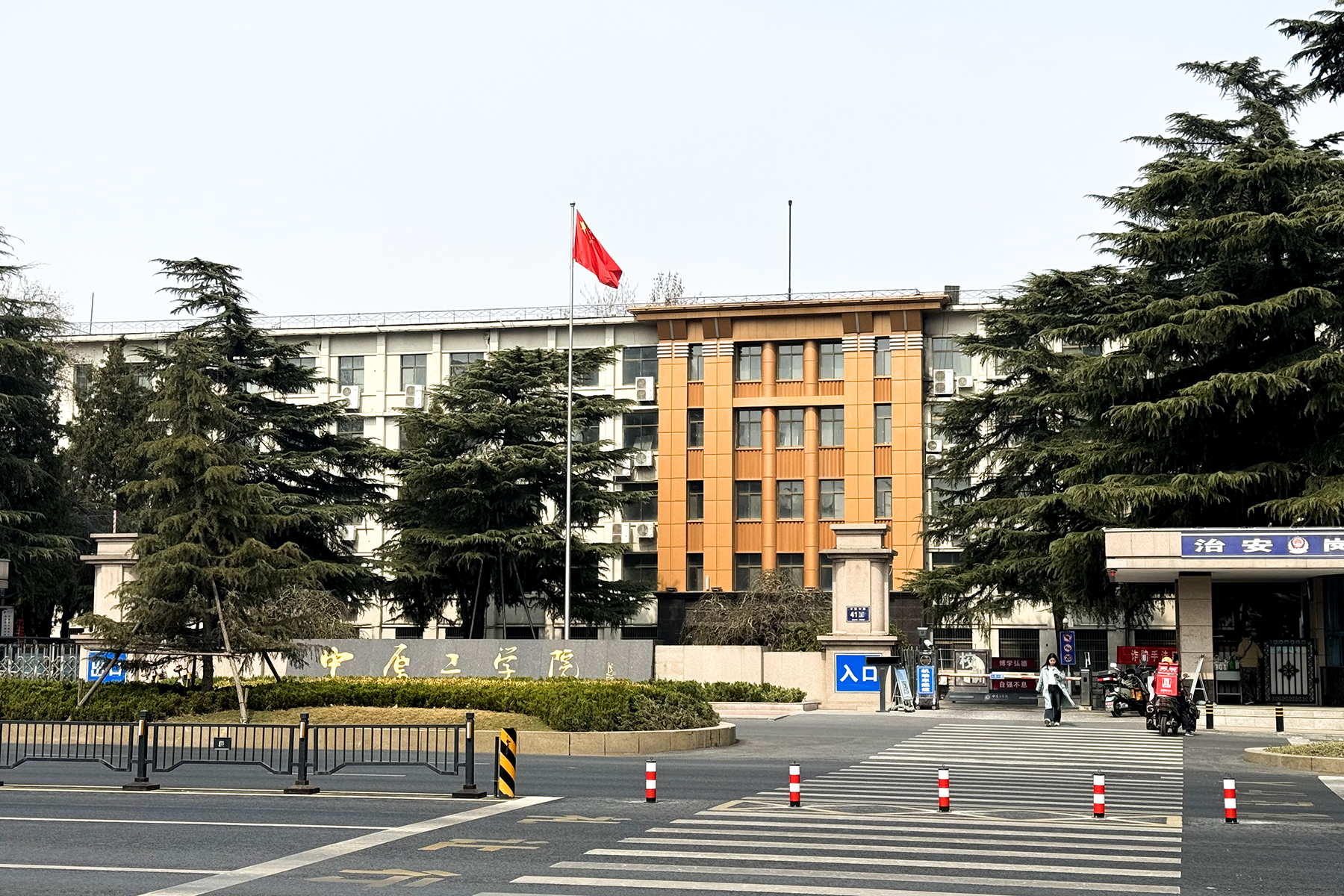
  Main gate of Zhongyuan University of Technology (Zhongyuan Campus)
- School of Foreign Languages
- School of Architectural Engineering
- Department of Physical Education
- School of International Education
- Software College
- Zhongyuan-Petersburg Aviation College
- School of Mathematics and Information Sciences
- School of Continuing Education
- School of Physics and Optoelectronics
