= Wang Qimin (politician) =

Chinese petroleum engineer

Wang Qimin (September 26, 1937 - August 19, 2024, Chinese: 王启民), a native of Huzhou, Zhejiang, was a petroleum engineer and political figure in the People's Republic of China.

== Biography ==
Wang Qimin pursued a degree in petroleum geology at the Beijing Petroleum Institute from September 1956 to August 1961. From August 1961 to September 1962, he held the position of trainee in the development room and dynamic room of the Geological Institute of the Songliao Petroleum Warfare Command. He was employed as a technician in the dynamic chamber of the Geological Institute of the Songliao Petroleum Warfare Command from September 1962 to April 1964. He was employed as a technician in the dynamic chamber of the Daqing Oilfield Development Research Institute from April 1964 to October 1965. He served as a technician in the Dynamic Room of the Daqing Oilfield Development Research Institute from April 1964 to October 1965. He served as a geologist at the Daqing Oilfield Scientific Research Institute, a first-class technician in the Development Room, and a technician in the Development Room from April 1975 to January 1978.

He served as the deputy chief geologist of the Development Office of the Daqing Oilfield Research Institute from January 1978 to July 1984. Subsequently, he became a member of the Chinese Communist Party (CCP) in June 1978. From July 1984 to February 1992, he served as the deputy chief geologist of the Daqing Oilfield Research Institute of Exploration and Development of the Daqing Oilfield Administration. From February 1992 to December 1996, he served as the deputy director of the Daqing Oilfield Research Institute of Exploration and Development of the Daqing Oilfield Administration. From December 1996 to December 1998, he served as the director of the Daqing Oilfield Research Institute of Exploration. He held the positions of assistant director of Daqing Oil Administration from December 1998 to January 1999, assistant director and Deputy Chief Geologist of Daqing Oil Administration from January to December 1999, and Assistant General Manager and Deputy Chief Geologist of Daqing Oil Field in December 1999.

He was granted the national honorific title of "People's Model" (Chinese: 人民楷模) on September 17, 2019, and was an alternate of the 15th Central Committee of the Chinese Communist Party.

Wang Qimin died at the PetroChina Central Hospital in Langfang, Hebei, on August 19, 2024, at the age of 87.
