= Qian Shugen =

Chinese general, born 1939

- 钱树根

Deputy Chief of the PLA General Staff Department
- In office 20 July 1995 – 11 June 2004
- Chief: Zhang Wannian; Fu Quanyou; Liang Guanglie

Chief of Staff of the Lanzhou Military Region
- In office November 1992 – December 1994
- Preceded by: Chi Yunxiu
- Succeeded by: Li Qianyuan

Personal details
- Born: 29 March 1939 (age 87) Wuxi County, Jiangsu, China
- Party: Chinese Communist Party
- Education: Chongqing Artillery School; PLA Military Academy

Military service
- Allegiance: People's Republic of China
- Branch/service: People's Liberation Army Ground Force
- Years of service: 1954–2004
- Rank: General

Chinese name
- Simplified Chinese: 钱树根
- Traditional Chinese: 錢樹根
Transcriptions
Standard Mandarin
- Hanyu Pinyin: Qián Shùgēn

Qian Shugen (Chinese: 钱树根; born 29 March 1939) is a general in the People's Liberation Army of China. He was an alternate member of the 13th and 14th Central Committee of the Chinese Communist Party and a member of the 15th and 16th Central Committee of the Chinese Communist Party.

== Biography ==
Qian was born in Wuxi County (now Wuxi), Jiangsu, on 29 March 1939. He enlisted in the People's Liberation Army (PLA) in August 1954, and joined the Chinese Communist Party (CCP) in October 1956. After graduating from Chongqing Artillery School in 1956, he was assigned to the Guangzhou Military Region. In 1979, he entered the PLA Military Academy, where he graduated in 1981. He was commander of the 47th Group Army in March 1985, and held that office until June 1990. It was in this post that he won fame for his heroic efforts at the Laoshan Border War. As a result of his distinguished service at that war, he was promoted to major general in September 1988. In November 1992, he was promoted to become the chief of staff of the Lanzhou Military Region, succeeding Chi Yunxiu. He was promoted to assistant chief of the PLA General Staff Department in December 1994, and was promoted again to become deputy chief in July 1995.

He was promoted to the rank of major general (shaojiang) in September 1988, lieutenant general (zhongjiang) in July 1994, and general (shangjiang) in June 2000.

Military offices
Preceded by Dong Zhanlin	Commander of the 47th Group Army; 1985–1990	Succeeded by Guo Boxiong
Preceded by Chi Yunxiu	Chief of Staff of the Lanzhou Military Region; 1992–1994	Succeeded by Li Qianyuan
