= Sun Zhiqiang =

- 孙志强

Deputy Head of the People's Liberation Army General Logistics Department
- In office 24 December 1999 – 29 December 2007
- Head: Wang Ke; Liao Xilong

Personal details
- Born: 1944 (age 81–82) Rushan County, Shandong, China
- Party: Chinese Communist Party
- Education: Central University of Finance and Economics

Military service
- Allegiance: People's Republic of China
- Branch/service: People's Liberation Army Ground Force
- Years of service: 1970–2007
- Rank: Lieutenant general

Chinese name
- Simplified Chinese: 孙志强
- Traditional Chinese: 孫志強
Transcriptions
Standard Mandarin
- Hanyu Pinyin: Sūn Zhìqiáng

Sun Zhiqiang (Chinese: 孙志强; born 1944) a lieutenant general in the People's Liberation Army of China. He was a delegate to the 9th National People's Congress and a member of the 16th Central Committee of the Chinese Communist Party. He was a member of the Standing Committee of the 11th Chinese People's Political Consultative Conference.

== Biography ==
Sun was born in Rushan County (now Rushan), Shandong, in 1944. In 1964, he was accepted to Central University of Finance and Economics, majoring in finance. After graduation in 1968, he became a sent-down youth in a farm.

He enlisted in the People's Liberation Army (PLA) in April 1970, and joined the Chinese Communist Party (CCP) in December 1976. From 1972 to 1985, he served in the Logistics Department of Kunming Military District. In July 1985, he became deputy head of the Finance Division of the People's Liberation Army General Logistics Department, rising to head in November 1991. He was promoted to deputy head of the People's Liberation Army General Logistics Department, and served until December 2007.

He was promoted to the rank of major general (shaojiang) in June 1991 and lieutenant general (zhongjiang) in July 2001.
