= Zhou Shengtao =

Chinese politician

- 周声涛

Party Branch Secretary of the All China Federation of Supply and Marketing Cooperatives
- In office September 2002 – July 2007
- Preceded by: Wang Jinshan
- Succeeded by: Wang Jun

Personal details
- Born: April 1944 (age 82) Dongtai County, Jiangsu, China
- Party: Chinese Communist Party
- Education: Nanjing Normal University

Chinese name
- Simplified Chinese: 周声涛
- Traditional Chinese: 周聲濤
Transcriptions
Standard Mandarin
- Hanyu Pinyin: Zhōu Shēngtāo

Zhou Shengtao (Chinese: 周声涛; born April 1944) is a Chinese politician who served as party branch secretary of the All China Federation of Supply and Marketing Cooperatives from 2002 to 2007. He was a member of the 14th CCP Central Commission for Discipline Inspection. He was an alternate of the 15th Central Committee of the Chinese Communist Party and a member of the 16th Central Committee of the Chinese Communist Party. He was a member of the Standing Committee of the 11th National People's Congress.

== Biography ==
Zhou was born in Dongtai County, Jiangsu, in April 1944. He secondary studied at Anfeng High School. In 1962, he entered Nanjing Normal University, majoring in mathematics. He joined the Chinese Communist Party (CCP) in May 1966, when he was about to graduate.

After University in 1967, he was assigned to the Xinjiang Production and Construction Corps, where he was eventually elevated to secretary of its Discipline Inspection Commission in April 1987. He was appointed secretary of Discipline Inspection Commission of CCP Xinjiang Uygur Autonomous Regional Committee in March 1991 and was admitted to member of the Standing Committee of the CCP Xinjiang Uygur Autonomous Regional Committee, the region's top authority. He was made deputy party secretary of Xinjiang in February 1996, concurrently serving as secretary of the Xinjiang Uygur Autonomous Regional Political and Legal Affairs Commission since April 1998.

In September 2002, he was transferred to Beijing and appointed party branch secretary of the All China Federation of Supply and Marketing Cooperatives. He also served as executive deputy director of the Council between February 2003 and March 2010. In March 2008, he was chosen as vice chairperson of the National People's Congress Ethnic Affairs Committee, serving in the post until his retirement in March 2013.

Party political offices
Preceded by Wang Jinshan	Party Branch Secretary of the All China Federation of Supply and Marketing Cooperatives; 2002–2007	Succeeded by Wang Jun
