= Ye Qing (politician) =

Chinese businessman and politician

- 叶青

Vice Chairman, All-China Federation of Industry and Commerce
- Incumbent
- Assumed office 2017

Standing Committee Member, Chinese People's Political Consultative Conference
- In office 2017

Deputy Director, Standing Committee of the Chaoyang District People's Congress
- In office 2017

Personal details
- Born: June 1966 (age 60)
- Party: Chinese Communist Party
- Education: Beijing Institute of Fashion Technology

Ye Qing (simplified Chinese: 叶青; traditional Chinese: 叶青; pinyin: Yè Qīng; born June 1966) is a Chinese businessman and politician. Ye is the CEO of Beijing Yeshi Enterprise Group Co., Ltd, current Standing Committee Member of the 12th Chinese People's Political Consultative Conference, Vice Chairman of the All-China Federation of Industry and Commerce, Deputy Director of the Standing Committee of the Chaoyang District People's Congress in Beijing, and Chairman of the Chaoyang District Federation of Industry and Commerce.

On October 24, 2018, he was included on a list of the "100 Outstanding Private Entrepreneurs in the 40 Years of Reform and Opening-up" by the United Front Work Department and the All-China Federation of Industry and Commerce.

== Career ==
In January 2015, he was appointed Deputy Director of the Standing Committee of the Chaoyang District People's Congress in Beijing.

In November 2017, Ye was promoted to Vice Chairman of the All-China Federation of Industry and Commerce, the Deputy Director of the Standing Committee of the Chaoyang District People's Congress in Beijing, Chairman of the Chaoyang District Federation of Industry and Commerce.
