= 16th Central Committee of the Chinese Communist Party =

2002–2007 Central Committee

The 16th Central Committee of the Chinese Communist Party was in session from 2002 to 2007. It held seven plenary sessions. It was set in motion by the 16th National Congress of the Chinese Communist Party. The 15th Central Committee preceded it. It was followed by the 17th Central Committee of the Chinese Communist Party.

It elected the 16th Politburo of the Chinese Communist Party in 2002. There were seven plenary sessions held in the five-year period facilitated by the Politburo.

== Members ==
In stroke order of surnames:

1. Xi Jinping (习近平)
2. Ma Kai (马凯)
3. Ma Qizhi (马启智), Hui
4. Ma Xiaotian (马晓天)
5. Wang Gang (王刚)
6. Wang Chen (王晨)
7. Wang Yunlong (王云龙)
8. Wang Yunkun (王云坤)
9. Wang Taihua (王太华)
10. Wang Lequan (王乐泉)
11. Wang Zhaoguo (王兆国)
12. Wang Zhongfu (王众孚)
13. Wang Xudong (王旭东)
14. Wang Qishan (王岐山)
15. Wang Huning (王沪宁)
16. Wang Jinshan (王金山)
17. Wang Jianmin (王建民)
18. Wang Shengjun (王胜俊)
19. Wang Hongju (王鸿举)
20. Uyunqimg (乌云其木格), f. Mongolian
21. Deng Changyou (邓昌友)
22. Shi Yunsheng (石云生)
23. Shi Xiushi (石秀诗)
24. Shi Zongyuan (石宗源), Hui
25. Lu Zhangong (卢展工)
26. Tian Fengshan (田凤山)
27. Tian Chengping (田成平)
28. Tian Congming (田聪明)
29. Bai Lichen (白立忱), Hui
30. Bai Zhijian (白志健)
31. Bai Keming (白克明)
32. Bai Enpei (白恩培)
33. Ismail Amat (司马义·艾买提), Uygur
34. Legqog (列确), Tibetan
35. Lü Fuyuan (吕福源)
36. Hui Liangyu (回良玉), Hui
37. Zhu Qi (朱启)
38. Qiao Qingchen (乔清晨)
39. Hua Jianmin (华建敏)
40. Doje Cering (多吉才让), Tibetan
41. Liu Jing (刘京)
42. Liu Qi (刘淇)
43. Liu Yunshan (刘云山)
44. Liu Shutian (刘书田)
45. Liu Dongdong (刘冬冬)
46. Liu Yongzhi (刘永治)
47. Liu Yandong (刘延东), f.
48. Liu Huaqiu (刘华秋)
49. Liu Zhijun (刘志军)
50. Liu Zhenhua (刘振华)
51. Liu Zhenwu (刘镇武)
52. Xu Yongyue (许永跃)
53. Xu Qiliang (许其亮)
54. Sun Zhiqiang (孙志强)
55. Sun Jiazheng (孙家正)
56. Mou Xinsheng (牟新生)
57. Su Rong (苏荣)
58. Du Qinglin (杜青林)
59. Li Changjiang (李长江)
60. Li Changchun (李长春)
61. Li Zhilun (李至伦)
62. Li Zhaozhuo (李兆焯), Zhuang
63. Li Andong (李安东)
64. Li Keqiang (李克强)
65. Li Jinhua (李金华)
66. Li Jianguo (李建国)
67. Li Rongrong (李荣融)
68. Li Dongheng (李栋恒)
69. Li Guixian (李贵鲜)
70. Li Tielin (李铁林)
71. Li Jinai (李继耐)
72. Li Qianyuan (李乾元)
73. Li Shenglin (李盛霖)
74. Li Zhaoxing (李肇星)
75. Li Dezhu (李德洙), Korean
76. Li Yizhong (李毅中)
77. Yang Yuanyuan (杨元元)
78. Yang Zhengwu (杨正午), Tujia
79. Yang Huaiqing (杨怀庆)
80. Yang Deqing (杨德清)
81. Xiao Yang (肖扬)
82. Wu Yi (吴仪), f.
83. Wu Shuangzhan (吴双战)
84. Wu Bangguo (吴邦国)
85. Wu Guanzheng (吴官正)
86. He Yong (何勇)
87. Wang Guangtao (汪光焘)
88. Wang Shucheng (汪恕诚)
89. Wang Xiaofeng (汪啸风)
90. Shen Binyi (沈滨义)
91. Song Fatang (宋法棠)
92. Song Zhaosu (宋照肃)
93. Song Defu (宋德福)
94. Chi Wanchun (迟万春)
95. Zhang Yunchuan (张云川)
96. Zhang Zhongwei (张中伟)
97. Zhang Wentai (张文台)
98. Zhang Wenkang (张文康)
99. Zhang Yutai (张玉台)
100. Zhang Zuoji (张左己)
101. Zhang Lichang (张立昌)
102. Zhang Qingwei (张庆伟)
103. Zhang Qingli (张庆黎)
104. Zhang Xuezhong (张学忠)
105. Zhang Chunxian (张春贤)
106. Zhang Junjiu (张俊九)
107. Zhang Gaoli (张高丽)
108. Zhang Weiqing (张维庆)
109. Zhang Fusen (张福森)
110. Zhang Dejiang (张德江)
111. Zhang Delin (张德邻)
112. Lu Hao (陆浩)
113. Abdul'ahat Abdulrixit (阿不来提·阿不都热西提), Uygur
114. Chen Yunlin (陈云林)
115. Chen Zhili (陈至立), f.
116. Chen Chuankuo (陈传阔)
117. Chen Liangyu (陈良宇)
118. Chen Jianguo (陈建国)
119. Chen Kuiyuan (陈奎元)
120. Chen Bingde (陈炳德)
121. Chen Fujin (陈福今)
122. Luo Gan (罗干)
123. Luo Qingquan (罗清泉)
124. Ji Yunshi (季允石)
125. Jin Renqing (金人庆)
126. Zhou Qiang (周强)
127. Zhou Xiaochuan (周小川)
128. Zhou Yongkang (周永康)
129. Zhou Shengtao (周声涛)
130. Zhou Yuqi (周遇奇)
131. Zheng Wantong (郑万通)
132. Zheng Silin (郑斯林)
133. Meng Xuenong (孟学农)
134. Meng Jianzhu (孟建柱)
135. Xiang Huaicheng (项怀诚)
136. Zhao Keming (赵可铭)
137. Zhao Leji (赵乐际)
138. Zhao Qizheng (赵启正)
139. Hu Jintao (胡锦涛)
140. Niu Maosheng (钮茂生)
141. Yu Zhengsheng (俞正声)
142. Wen Shizhen (闻世震)
143. Jiang Futang (姜福堂)
144. Hong Hu (洪虎)
145. He Guoqiang (贺国强)
146. Yuan Weimin (袁伟民)
147. Raidi (热地), Tibetan
148. Jia Qinglin (贾庆林)
149. Jia Zhibang (贾治邦)
150. Jia Chunwang (贾春旺)
151. Chai Songyue (柴松岳)
152. Qian Yunlu (钱运录)
153. Qian Guoliang (钱国梁)
154. Qian Shugen (钱树根)
155. Xu Caihou (徐才厚)
156. Xu Kuangdi (徐匡迪)
157. Xu Youfang (徐有芳)
158. Xu Guangchun (徐光春)
159. Xu Rongkai (徐荣凯)
160. Xu Guanhua (徐冠华)
161. Gao Siren (高祀仁)
162. Guo Boxiong (郭伯雄)
163. Guo Jinlong (郭金龙)
164. Tang Tianbiao (唐天标)
165. Tang Jiaxuan (唐家璇)
166. Huang Ju (黄菊)
167. Huang Huahua (黄华华)
168. Huang Qingyi (黄晴宜), f.
169. Huang Zhiquan (黄智权)
170. Huang Zhendong (黄镇东)
171. Cao Gangchuan (曹刚川)
172. Cao Bochun (曹伯纯)
173. Chang Wanquan (常万全)
174. Fu Tinggui (符廷贵)
175. Yan Haiwang (阎海旺)
176. Liang Guanglie (梁光烈)
177. Sui Mingtai (隋明太)
178. Ge Zhenfeng (葛振峰)
179. Han Zheng (韩正)
180. Chu Bo (储波)
181. Zeng Qinghong (曾庆红)
182. Zeng Peiyan (曾培炎)
183. Wen Zongren (温宗仁)
184. Wen Jiabao (温家宝)
185. Pu Haiqing (蒲海清)
186. Meng Jinxi (蒙进喜)
187. Lei Mingqiu (雷鸣球）
188. Yu Yunyao (虞云耀)
189. Lu Yongxiang (路甬祥)
190. Xie Zhenhua (解振华)
191. Jing Zhiyuan (靖志远)
192. Liao Hui (廖晖)
193. Liao Xilong (廖锡龙)
194. Teng Wensheng (滕文生)
195. Bo Xilai (薄熙来)
196. Dai Bingguo (戴秉国), Tujia
197. Dai Xianglong (戴相龙)
198. Wei Liqun (魏礼群)

== Brief chronology ==
1. 1st Plenary Session
  - Date: November 15, 2002
  - Location: Beijing
  - Significance: Significance: Hu Jintao was elected General Secretary, Jiang Zemin was appointed Chairman of the Central Military Commission. A 25-members Politburo, a 9-members Politburo Standing Committee and a 7-members Secretariat with Zeng Qinghong as first-ranking secretary were elected. Wu Guanzheng was appointed secretary of the Central Commission for Discipline Inspection. Wen Jiabao entered the Politburo Standing Committee for the first time.
2. 2nd Plenary Session
  - Date: February 24–25, 2003
  - Location: Beijing
  - Significance: The meeting approved lists of nominees for top posts of the 10th National People's Congress and the 10th National Committee of the Chinese People's Political Consultative Conference.
3. 3rd Plenary Session
  - Date: October 11–14, 2003
  - Location: Beijing
  - Significance: A Decision of the CCP Central Committee on Certain Issues Concerning the Socialist Market Economy System and a Proposal by the CCP Central Committee to Revise Parts of the State Constitution were adopted. Regulations to facilitate private enterprise were called for.
4. 4th Plenary Session
  - Date: September 16–19, 2004
  - Location: Beijing
  - Significance: Hu Jintao delivered a report on behalf of the Politburo, Zeng Qinghong delivered an explanatory speech on the Decision of the CCP Central Committee on Strengthening the Party's Governance Capability. Jiang Zemin announced his retirement, and Hu Jintao was appointed Chairman of the Central Military Commission, with Xu Caihou replacing him as vice-chairman.
5. 5th Plenary Session
  - Date: October 8–11, 2005
  - Location: Beijing
  - Significance: Hu Jintao delivered a report on behalf of the Politburo, Wen Jiabao made a report on the guidelines for the 11th Five-Year Plan. The goal to promote "social harmony" was launched. The official communique stressed on the "building of democratic rule of law, justice, sincerity, amity, vitality, stability and order", and simultaneously fostered the promotion of cross-straits relations with Taiwan and the "reunification of the motherland"; on March 15, an Anti-Secession Law had been adopted.
6. 6th Plenary Session
  - Date: October 8–11, 2006
  - Location: Beijing
  - Significance: Hu Jintao delivered a report on behalf of the Politburo, Wu Bangguo made an explanatory speech on the Decision of the CCP Central Committee on Certain Major Issues in the Building of an Harmonious Socialist Society.
7. 7th Plenary Session
  - Date: October 9–12, 2007
  - Location: Beijing
  - Significance: Preparations for the Party's 17th National Congress were made. The Scientific Development Concept was officially endorsed. Former Mayor of Shanghai Chen Liangyu, close ally to Jiang Zemin and rival to Hu Jintao, and former Mayor of Qingdao Du Shicheng were expelled from the Party for alleged corruption.
