= Nie Weiguo =

Chinese politician

Nie Weiguo (simplified Chinese: 聂卫国; traditional Chinese: 聶衛國; pinyin: Niè Wèigúo; born August 1952) is a Chinese politician. He is the director of the Engineering Oversight Office of the Three Gorges Dam project.

Nie has occupied numerous Chinese Communist Party positions in Sichuan and Chongqing. He received a degree in political economics from the Central Party School in 1996. From 2005 to 2010, Nie was the political commissar of the Xinjiang Production and Construction Corps. He was a member of the 16th and 17th, and 18th Central Committees of the Chinese Communist Party.

Political offices
Preceded by Chen Demin	Political Commissar of the Xinjiang Production and Construction Corps; 2005–2010	Succeeded by Che Jun
