= Huang Qingyi =

Chinese politician

Huang Qingyi (Chinese: 黄晴宜; born October 1944) is a politician of the People's Republic of China. From 2007 to 2010 she served as vice chairman of the All-China Women's Federation.

== Biography ==
Born in Suqian, Jiangsu Province in October 1944, Huang joined the Chinese Communist Party (CCP) in March 1966, and started working in July 1966. From September 1962 to July 1966, she studied in the Gardening Department of the Henan Institute of Agriculture, majoring in fruits. She has served in various posts in Henan. In June 1992, she was appointed as vice director of the Organization Department of the Henan Provincial Committee of the Chinese Communist Party. In December 1995, she was elected a standing committee member of the CCP Henan committee. In March 1996, she was promoted to director of the Organization Department of the committee. In August 1998, she was appointed as vice secretary of the CCP Henan committee as well as the head of its Organization Department. In September 1999, she was elevated to vice director of the Organization Department of the Chinese Communist Party. In August 2002, she became the leader of the Party group of the All-China Women's Federation. In December of the same year, Huang was elevated to vice chairman, leader of the Party group and secretary of the secretariat of the Federation. In August 2003, she became the vice chairman, leader of the Party group and the first secretary of the secretariat of the Federation.

Huang was an alternate of the 15th Central Committee of the Chinese Communist Party, and a full member of the 16th Central Committee and 17th Central Committee.
