= Qian Yunlu =

Chinese politician (born 1944)

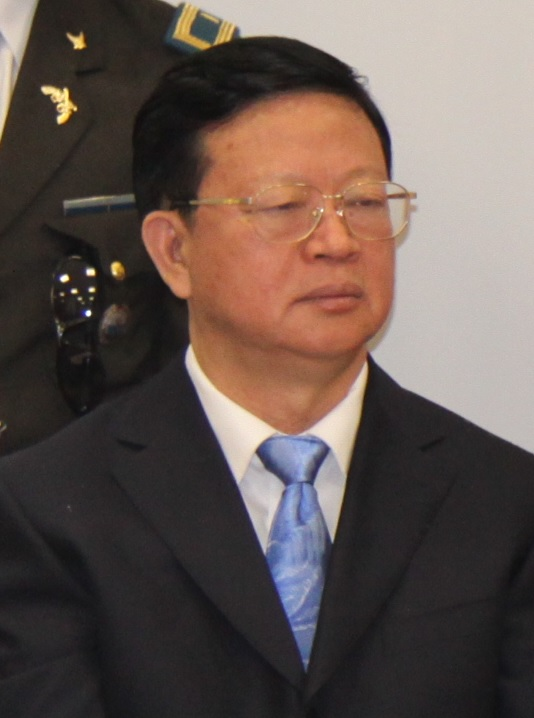
Qian Yunlu

Qian Yunlu (Chinese: 钱运录; pinyin: Qián Yùnlù; born October 1944) is a retired Chinese politician. He served as the Communist Party chief of Heilongjiang province in Northeastern China and Guizhou province in southwest China. He also served as Governor of Guizhou.

Qian Yunlu was born in Hubei province in 1944. He was elected Communist Party chief of Heilongjiang on January 27, 2008.

Political offices
Preceded by Wu Yixia	Governor of Guizhou; 1998–2000	Succeeded by Shi Xiushi
Preceded by Liu Fangren	Party Secretary of Guizhou; 2000–2005	Succeeded by Shi Zongyuan
Preceded by Song Fatang	Party Secretary of Heilongjiang; 2005–2008	Succeeded by Ji Bingxuan
