= Shen Binyi =

Chinese military personnel (1944–2023)

- 沈滨义

Deputy Commander of the People's Liberation Army Navy
- In office December 1999 – December 2004
- Commander: Shi Yunsheng; Zhang Dingfa

Deputy Head of the People's Liberation Army General Logistics Department
- In office December 1994 – December 1999
- Head: Fu Quanyou; Wang Ke

Personal details
- Born: December 1944 Yiwu County, Zhejiang, China
- Died: 5 July 2023 (aged 78)
- Party: Chinese Communist Party
- Education: PLA National Defence University

Military service
- Allegiance: People's Republic of China
- Branch/service: People's Liberation Army Navy
- Years of service: 1964–2004
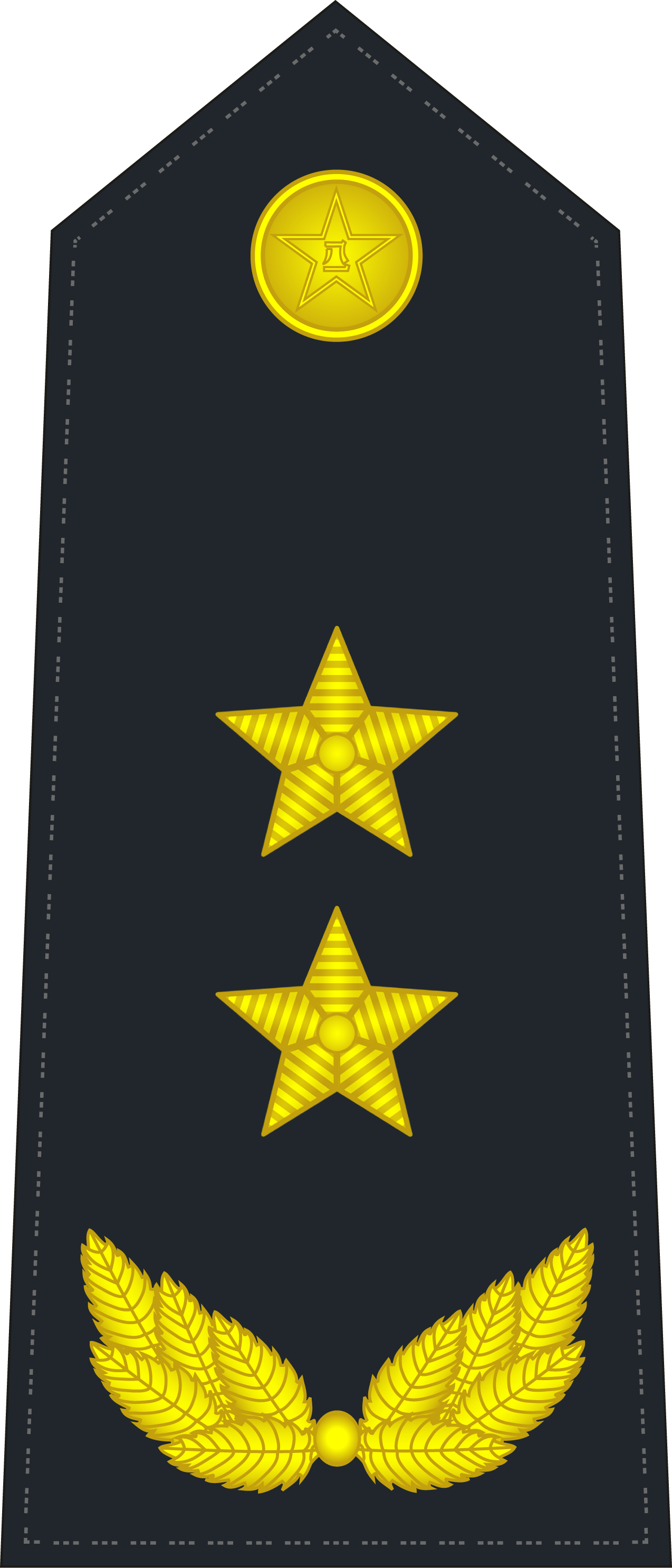
- Rank: Vice admiral

Chinese name
- Simplified Chinese: 沈滨义
- Traditional Chinese: 沈濱義
Transcriptions
Standard Mandarin
- Hanyu Pinyin: Shěn Bīnyì

Shen Binyi (Chinese: 沈滨义; December 1944 – 5 July 2023) was a vice admiral in the People's Liberation Army Navy (PLAN) of China. He was an alternate member of the 14th and 15th Central Committee of the Chinese Communist Party. He was a member of the 16th Central Committee of the Chinese Communist Party. He was a member of the Standing Committee of the 11th Chinese People's Political Consultative Conference.

== Biography ==
Shen Binyi was born in Yiwu County (now Yiwu), Zhejiang, in December 1944. He enlisted in the People's Liberation Army (PLA) in December 1964, and joined the Chinese Communist Party (CCP) in December 1966. Starting in December 1965, he worked in the PLA Navy. He was chief of staff of the Fujian Naval Base in August 1985, deputy chief of staff of the East China Sea Fleet in October 1989, and commander of the Shanghai Naval Base in August 1991. He was promoted to assistant head of the People's Liberation Army General Logistics Department in March 1993. In December 1994, he was promoted again to become deputy head. In December 1999, he was commissioned as deputy commander of the PLA Navy, serving in the post until his retirement in December 2004.

Shen was promoted to the rank of rear admiral (shaojiang) in 1990 and vice admiral (zhongjiang) in 1996.

Shen died on 5 July 2023, at the age of 78.
