= Yuan Shoufang =

Chinese general (born 1939)

- 袁守芳

Director of the Political Department of the Jinan Military Region
- In office October 1994 – January 1996
- Preceded by: Tan Naida
- Succeeded by: Huang Xuelu

Personal details
- Born: March 1939 (age 87) Jilin City, Jilin, Manchukuo
- Party: Chinese Communist Party

Military service
- Allegiance: People's Republic of China
- Branch/service: People's Liberation Army Ground Force
- Years of service: 1958–2004
- Rank: General

Yuan Shoufang (Chinese: 袁守芳; pinyin: Yuán Shǒufāng), born March 1939 in Jilin City, Jilin), is a General and Director of the General Political Department of the People's Liberation Army of China.

Military offices
Preceded by Tan Naida	Director of the Political Department of the Jinan Military Region; 1994–1996	Succeeded by Huang Xuelu
