= Ji Yunshi =

Chinese politician

Ji Yunshi (Chinese: 季允石; pinyin: Jì Yǔnshí, born September 1945) is a Chinese politician. He served in a variety of offices, including Governor of Jiangsu (1998–2002), Governor of Hebei (2002–2006), Vice-Minister for Human Resources and Social Security (2006–2011) and director of the State Administration of Foreign Experts Affairs (2006–2011).

Ji Yunshi was born in Haimen, Jiangsu. He started his professional career as an industrial worker in Suzhou in September 1969. During 1970–1971, in the period of the Cultural Revolution, he was sent to work in the Xishan Coal Mine in Suzhou. He became a member of the Communist Party in August 1975. In June 1989, he was appointed Vice Governor of Jiangsu Province for the first time. He served in this capacity until 1998, when he became Acting Governor of Jiangsu Province.

From 2002 to 2007, he was a member of the 16th Central Committee of the Chinese Communist Party. He retired in 2011.
