= Shi Zongyuan =

Chinese politician (1946–2013)

- 石宗源

Party Secretary of Guizhou
- In office December 2005 – August 2010
- Preceded by: Qian Yunlu
- Succeeded by: Li Zhanshu

Director General of the General Administration of Press and Publication
- In office 2000–2005
- Preceded by: Yu Youxian
- Succeeded by: Long Xinmin

Personal details
- Born: July 1946 Ya'an, Sichuan, China
- Died: March 28, 2013 (aged 66) Beijing, China
- Party: Chinese Communist Party
- Education: Northwest Minzu University

Shi Zongyuan (Chinese: 石宗源; pinyin: Shí Zōngyuán; July 1946 – March 28, 2013), ethnic Hui, was a politician of the People's Republic of China, and former secretary of the Chinese Communist Party Provincial Standing Committee of Guizhou and chairman of Guizhou people's congress.

== Biography ==
Shi was studying during four years (1964–1968) in the Northwest University for Nationalities. After his graduation from the department of politics, he started working in October 1968, and joined the Chinese Communist Party (CCP) in May 1979. He had served during ten years (1969–1979) in various posts in Hezheng County of Gansu Province before eventually becoming the mayor of Hezheng. From July 1984 to November 1986, he served as vice mayor of Linxia Hui Autonomous Prefecture of Gansu. From September 1985 to January 1986, he studied at CCP Central Party School. In November 1986, he became vice secretary of CCP Linxia committee, and was elevated to secretary in April 1988. He was appointed as minister of publicity and a standing committee member of Gansu Provincial Committee of the Chinese Communist Party. From September to November 1997, he again studied at Central Party School. In August 1998, Shi was transferred to Jilin Province and served as a standing committee member of CCP Jilin committee. He became the head of Publicity Department of Jilin in October 1998. He was elevated to vice secretary of CCP Jilin committee in May 2000. In September 2000, he was appointed as director and Party chief of General Administration of Press and Publication of the People's Republic of China and the director of National Copyright Administration of the People's Republic of China. In December 2005, he became the secretary of CCP Guizhou committee, and since January 2006, Shi has served as Party chief of Guizhou and the chairman of Guizhou people's congress.

Shi was an alternate member of 14th and 15th Central Committees of the Chinese Communist Party (1992-2002), and a full member of 16th and 17th Central Committees (2002-2012). He died on 28 March 2013 at the age of 66, at a hospital in Beijing.

Party political offices
Preceded by Qian Yunlu	Party Secretary of Guizhou; 2005-2010	Succeeded by Li Zhanshu
Government offices
Preceded by Yu Youxian	Director General of the General Administration of Press and Publication; 2000-2005	Succeeded by Long Xinmin
