= Liu Zemin =

Chinese politician

Liu Zemin (Chinese: 刘泽民; July 1944 – 27 February 2017) was a Chinese politician. He was born in Lin County, Shanxi.

Preceded by	Communist Party Chief of Lüliang; 1988–1990	Succeeded by
Preceded by	Communist Party Chief of Shuozhou; 1990–1992	Succeeded by
Preceded by Zheng Shekui	CPPCC Chairman of Shanxi; 2003–2008	Succeeded by Jin Yinhuan
