= Gao Siren =

Hong Kong politician

- Chinese: 高祀仁
Transcriptions
Standard Mandarin
- Hanyu Pinyin: Gāo Sìrén

Gao Siren (born March 1944 in Qingdao, Shandong) was the director of the Liaison Office of the Central People's Government in the Hong Kong Special Administrative Region from 2002 to 2009. From 2000 to 2002, he was the deputy director of the Liaison Office.

== Sources ==
- "Reception marks change of chief of central government liaison office in Hong Kong". enorth.com.cn. Publicity Department of Tianjin Municipal Party Committee. 2002-09-17.

Political offices
Preceded by Jiang Enzhu	Director of Liaison Office of the Central People's Government in Hong Kong; 2002－2009	Succeeded by Peng Qinghua
