= Song Fatang =

Chinese politician

- Traditional Chinese: 宋法棠
- Simplified Chinese: 宋法棠
Transcriptions
Standard Mandarin
- Hanyu Pinyin: Sòng Fǎtáng

Song Fatang (born December 1940) is a politician of the People's Republic of China and former governor and Chinese Communist Party (CCP) Party Committee Secretary of Heilongjiang.

Song is a native of Tancheng County, Shandong. He joined the CCP in March 1961, and entered the workforce in July 1964. He received an undergraduate degree in Chinese language from Qufu Teachers College (now Qufu Normal University). During the 1960s and 1970s, Song held a number of positions in Shandong province. In 1985, he was appointed deputy party committee secretary and mayor of Tai'an, Shandong. In 1989, Song was elevated to the position of vice governor of Shandong.

Song was transferred to the position of deputy party committee secretary of Heilongjiang in 1999, and in 2000 was appointed acting governor and then governor of the province. In 2003, he became party committee secretary of Heilongjiang, while concurrently serving as chairman of the Heilongjiang Provincial People's Congress Standing Committee. He resigned from these positions in 2006. In 2008, he became vice chairman of the Education, Science, Culture and Public Health Committee for the 11th National People's Congress.

Song was an alternate of the 15th Central Committee of the Chinese Communist Party and a full member of the 16th Central Committee.
