= Battle of Guanjianao =

1940 battle of the Second Sino-Japanese War

- Part of Hundred Regiments Offensive in the Second Sino-Japanese War
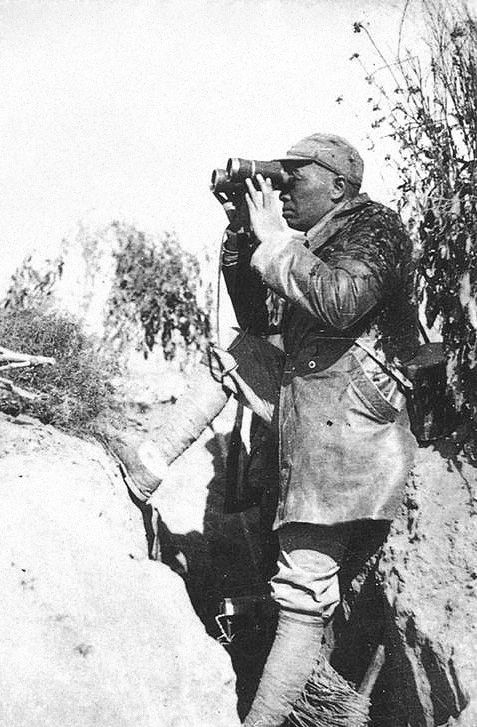
- In October 1940, Peng Dehuai commanded the operation on the front line of Guanjianao (photographed by Xu Xiaobing)
Date	October 30–31, 1940 (1 day)
Location	Guanjianao, Wuxiang County, Shanxi, China
Result	Japanese victory

Belligerents
(Taiwan) Republic of China	Empire of Japan

Commanders and leaders
(Taiwan) Peng Dehuai (Taiwan) Zuo Quan (Taiwan) Liu Bocheng (Taiwan) Deng Xiaoping	(Empire of Japan) Kenju Okazaki †

Units involved
Eighth Route Army: Taihang Mountains Headquarters; Special Service Regiment; 129th Division; 385th Brigade; 769th Regiment; 386th Brigade; 16th Regiment; 772nd Regiment; 1st Death-Defying Column; 25th Regiment; 38th Regiment; New 10th Brigade	(Empire of Japan) Imperial Japanese Army: Okazaki Detachment

Strength
20,000 men	500–535 men (Note: 535 was the total number of troops of the Okazaki Detachment participating in the Hundred Regiments Offensive. The Detachment had suffered some casualties prior to Guanjianao)

Casualties and losses
Heavy: 1st Death-Defying Column : 500+ killed 1,570 wounded	Japanese records: 50 killed 99 wounded Chinese claims: 400+ Japanese killed 280+ killed

The Battle of Guanjianao was the costliest offensive battle suffered by the Eighth Route Army during the Second Sino-Japanese War, and formed part of the third phase of the Hundred Regiments Offensive.

In the later stage of the Eighth Route Army's sabotage operations in North China, the Imperial Japanese Army counterattacked and advanced to areas close to the Eighth Route Army headquarters.

From 30 October to 31 October 1940, the Eighth Route Army assembled nearly 20,000 troops to besiege approximately 500 Japanese soldiers occupying Guanjianao. However, after two days and nights of fighting, the Japanese force was not completely annihilated. On 1 November, Japanese reinforcements arrived, forcing the Eighth Route Army to withdraw.

== Background ==
On the night of 20 August 1940, the Eighth Route Army started their sabotage operation of the Zhengtai Railway, which worried the Japanese 1st Army Headquarters in Taiyuan. Yangquan, a key hub in the mid-section of the railway, was under the attack of the enemy's 385th Brigade. Strategic locations such as Shinaoshan and Miaogaodi (Nanshan) fell repeatedly. On August 21, the Japanese 37th Division stationed in Yuncheng received an emergency order from the 1st Army to quickly draw troops from the 226th Infantry Regiment to form a mixed unit. Lieutenant Colonel Kenju Okazaki (Note: 冈崎谦受) was appointed as the commander of this unit, which consisted of three infantry companies (commanded by Shigeshi, Fukuda, and Arai, respectively), one regimental artillery platoon (led by Lieutenant Hakoda), and a machine gun squad, with a total of 516 men. The unit was sent north by train from Anyi to reinforce Yangquan. However, it fell into a trap laid by the opposition. The Zhengtai and Tongpu lines themselves suffered great damage. The Okazaki Detachment could only abandon the original plan of returning to the 37th Division and aid the 4th Independent Mixed Brigade in local "mopping-up operations". Some sources named this unit the "Okazaki Battalion".

According to information from the PLA Daily, Kenju Okazaki was rich with experience in China. Born on 11 March 1894, in Fukuoka Prefecture, Japan, he graduated from the 27th class of the Imperial Japanese Army Academy in 1915. Since December 1915, Okazaki served as a Second Lieutenant in the Army for more than 10 years. In his early years, he participated in the Siberian Expedition. During the Northern Expedition in 1928, he confronted the Northern Expeditionary Army in Tianjin, attempting to hinder their progress, and later participated in the conflicts of Northeast China. In 1939, Okazaki was transferred to the 37th Division stationed in Shanxi, serving successively as an attaché to the 37th Infantry Regimental Headquarters and the 226th Infantry Regiment.

On 6 October, Lieutenant General Hayao Tada, Commander of the Japanese North China Area Army, issued an operational order to the 1st Army to encircle the 129th Division of the Eighth Route Army in Southeastern Shanxi. The 1st Army again decided to draw troops from the 37th Division to form a reinforced Okazaki Detachment, now consisting of 5 officers, 150 non-commissioned officers and enlisted personnel from the 3rd Company of the 225th Infantry Regiment; 25 officers, 792 non-commissioned officers and enlisted personnel from the 2nd Battalion of the 226th Infantry Regiment; 5 officers, 146 non-commissioned officers and enlisted personnel from the 6th Company of the 227th Infantry Regiment; 2 officers, 101 non-commissioned officers and enlisted personnel from other units; plus Okazaki himself, for a total of 38 officers, 1,189 non-commissioned officers and enlisted personnel, adding up to 1,227 personnel in total.

Since Kenju Okazaki was still stationed along the Yangquan-Taiyuan line, the troops newly assigned to him had to head north to join their commander. Thus, the main force of this Japanese unit departed from Wenxi on 6 October and arrived at Nanguan Town on the 9th. Okazaki, with the remnants of his newly formed detachment, headed south from Taiyuan to Qin County on 6 October to join them. According to the original plan, the majority of this unit was to participate in the encirclement of the 129th Division of the Eighth Route Army located upstream of the Qin River, while Okazaki himself was to lead a portion of his troops (the remnants of the newly formed detachment and a small number of newly added troops) to remain in Qin County as a mobile force for subsequent operations. However, on October 11, the Japanese 1st Army suddenly changed its plan: due to the heavy losses suffered by the 4th Independent Mixed Brigade in the early stages of the Hundred Regiments Offensive and its weakened combat strength, Kenju Okazaki was ordered to personally lead the remaining troops to turn east of Wuxiang to again assist in its "mopping-up" operation. At this time, the troops led by Okazaki had become extremely mixed, consisting of units from several different mixed brigades, totaling 19 officers, 516 non-commissioned officers and soldiers, and 535 men in total. Because this unit was still led by Kenju Okazaki and the detachment headquarters were still located where he was stationed, it was still called a "detachment". This was because the Japanese unit of "detachment" was originally a temporary military designation to units with varying troop sizes.

Immediately, Okazaki led this hastily assembled and mission-changed unit to first cooperate with the Suzuki Detachment of the Japanese 4th Independent Mixed Brigade in "sweeping" Xijing Town and Dongyadi in Licheng. The unit advanced eastward along the route of Qin County, Xiying, and Wangjiayu in Shanxi Province, attempting to locate the headquarters of the Eighth Route Army and carry out a "decapitation" operation. On the 25th, Okazaki led more than 500 men eastward, mistakenly entering Huangya Cave along the Tongyu River Valley.

Huangya Cave is located in a deep valley in Licheng County, Shanxi Province, on the ridge of the Taihang Mountains. Surrounded by steep peaks, its only exit is a crack in the southern cliff, commonly known as "Wenggelang", barely wide enough for one person to pass through. The Shuiyaozi Arsenal, the headquarters of the Eighth Route Army, was located here. In 1939, after surveying the terrain, Zhu De, Peng Dehuai, and Zuo Quan unanimously decided to move the headquarters' arsenal here. By 1940, the arsenal had the capacity to produce more than 400 rifles and a large quantity of ammunition per month, and was regarded as the "precious treasure of the Eighth Route Army."

== Battle ==
Due to sudden and unexpected contact, the Okazaki Detachment was unprepared for battle at Huangya Cave. On Peng Dehuai's order, the Eighth Route Army gave chase and initiated another battle at Guanjianao, Panlong Town.

=== Initial engagement ===
At the time, the Okazaki Detachment was unaware of the Eighth Route Army's arsenal in Huangya Cave. According to Noboru Saita, a veteran of the unit who survived the war, they were unfamiliar with the local terrain, and coupled with a shortage of food and ammunition and difficulties in resupply, they took many detours, only beginning to turn back from the left on October 28th. In his recollection, Saita did not mention discovering the Eighth Route Army's arsenal.

Lieutenant General Peng Dehuai, Deputy Commander-in-Chief of the Eighth Route Army, had just moved from Zhuanbi Village to Licheng County. Upon hearing that the Japanese army had entered Huangya Cave, he was furious. "Which unit is guarding Wenggelang?" Peng Dehuai roared. "The 4th Company, 2nd Battalion, Special Service Regiment," Major General Zuo Quan, the acting Chief of Staff, replied. "Where is the company commander? Why did they let Okazaki in?" Peng Dehuai was extremely annoyed. Zuo Quan said angrily, "They withdrew without even fighting!" Peng Dehuai shouted, "Shoot them! Shoot them! They deserted their posts, shoot the company commander!" Peng Dehuai immediately ordered the 772nd Regiment and the 16th Regiment of the 386th Brigade, 129th Division, to rush to Huangya Cave.

On October 28, the Okazaki Detachment, unable to withstand the attack from parts of the 386th Brigade, prepared to take a detour through Wuxiang County and then back to Qin County, where they set up camp near Guanjianao, Panlong Town. According to the PLA Daily, after climbing the Taihang Banshan Pass, the Okazaki Detachment continued to "sweep" through Zuohui to Hongshui Town, but was blocked by the Eighth Route Army's New 10th Brigade and had to retreat southeast to Datang, where they were met with fierce resistance from the Eighth Route Army in Shimen Village and were forced to retreat north to the Liushunao and Guanjianao Heights. Peng Dehuai, however, was determined to annihilate this Japanese unit.

=== Preparations ===
On the afternoon of October 29, Peng Dehuai rushed from the Licheng Command Post to Shimen Village, Panlong Town, to personally oversee the command. That evening, he held a pre-battle meeting and formally issued the operational orders from the Eighth Route Army Headquarters: Liu Bocheng and Deng Xiaoping would command parts of the 386th Brigade of the 129th Division and parts of the newly formed 10th Brigade; Chen Geng would command parts of the 385th Brigade and parts of the 25th and 38th Regiments of the 1st Death-Defying Column; Peng Dehuai would personally command the mountain artillery company of the Headquarters Artillery Regiment to launch an attack on the Japanese at 4:00 a.m. on 30 October.

At the same time, Kenju Okazaki, driven by the sensitivity and military skills of a professional soldier, led his troops to occupy Guanjianao overnight. Guanjianao is located 13 li (approximately 6.5 kilometers) north of Zhuanbi Village, Panlong Town, Wuxiang County, Shanxi Province. To the south lies Licheng County, to the southwest Wangjiayu, to the west Wuxiang County, to the northwest Yushe County, and to the north Liao County. It is more than 300 li (approximately 150 kilometers) north of Taiyuan, the provincial capital. This area is characterized by towering mountains and deep ravines, and was the heart of the Taihang Anti-Japanese Base Area.

Guanjianao is a high hill surrounded by mountains, with a flat area of several hundred square meters at its summit. Its north side is a steep cliff, and the east and west sides have steep slopes, with only the south slope being relatively gentle and easy to access. From a military perspective, Guanjianao is a strategically important and easily defensible location. More than 50 families surnamed Guan live on the south slope, building a series of interconnected cave dwellings along the mountainside. Opposite the south slope is a higher hill called Liushunao, which forms a strategic point with Guanjianao. From Liushunao, firepower can be used to control the access routes to Guanjianao.

After Okazaki's troops occupied Guanjianao, they immediately began constructing fortifications. In addition, they dispatched a company to occupy Liushunao. Japanese soldiers not only dug tunnels but also dismantled doors and windows from local houses and used them as shelters. Machine gun positions were also set up on the flat ground at the summit. In this way, the Japanese army deployed a formidable defensive position at Guanjianao and Liushunao.

== Aftermath ==
The Eighth Route Army suffered heavy casualties besieging the Okazaki Detachment at Guanjianao and Liushunao, including the death of Xie Jiaqing, the commander of the 16th Regiment of the 386th Brigade, and the wounding of Fan Zixia, the commander of the New 10th Brigade. The 25th and 38th Regiments of the 1st Death-Defying Column alone suffered 500 killed and 1,570 wounded in the two offensives against the Okazaki Detachment. In the first general offensive from the morning of October 30, the 1st Battalion of the 772nd Regiment of the 386th Brigade suffered heavy casualties, with the 70-strong 1st Company reduced to 3 troops, the 50-strong 3rd Company reduced to the instructor and 2 wounded troops, and the 68-strong 4th Company reduced to more than 10 troops. Despite its losses, the battalion continued to attack, and by 2 p.m. had only 6 troops left. The 769th Regiment of the 385th Brigade and the Special Forces Regiment of the Headquarters also suffered considerable casualties in the first offensive.

The Battle of Guanjianao is regarded as one of the most controversial engagements of the Hundred Regiments Offensive, described by Peng Dehuai to be "a particularly hard-fought battle with relatively heavy casualties." He considered this to be one of the four major defeats of his military career. The others included Ganzhou (1932), Western Guanzhong-Eastern Longshan (1948), and the Fifth Phase Offensive (1951). Guanjianao, and the campaign as a whole, was later criticized for its use of positional warfare, incurring high casualties where the army could ill afford to.

According to Japanese internal record, the Okazaki Detachment suffered 50 (including 5 officers) killed and 99 (including 5 officers) wounded at Guanjianao, accounting for more than 60% of the total losses of the 4th Independent Mixed Brigade from 19 October until 14 November 1940. This is contrary to the CCP's claim that most combatants of the Detachment have been wiped out in the battle. However, Kuomintang records, including a telegram from General Wei Lihuang to Chiang Kai-shek, appeared to corroborate the CCP's claims.

The Japanese side's commanding officer, Kenju Okazaki, killed in action during the battle, was posthumously promoted to Colonel. He also received the posthumous Order of the Sacred Treasure, Fourth Class, and the raising of his status to Junior Fifth Rank through a request to then Prime Minister Fumimaro Konoe.
