= Hundred Regiments Offensive =

1940 military offensive of the Second Sino-Japanese War

- Part of the Second Sino-Japanese War
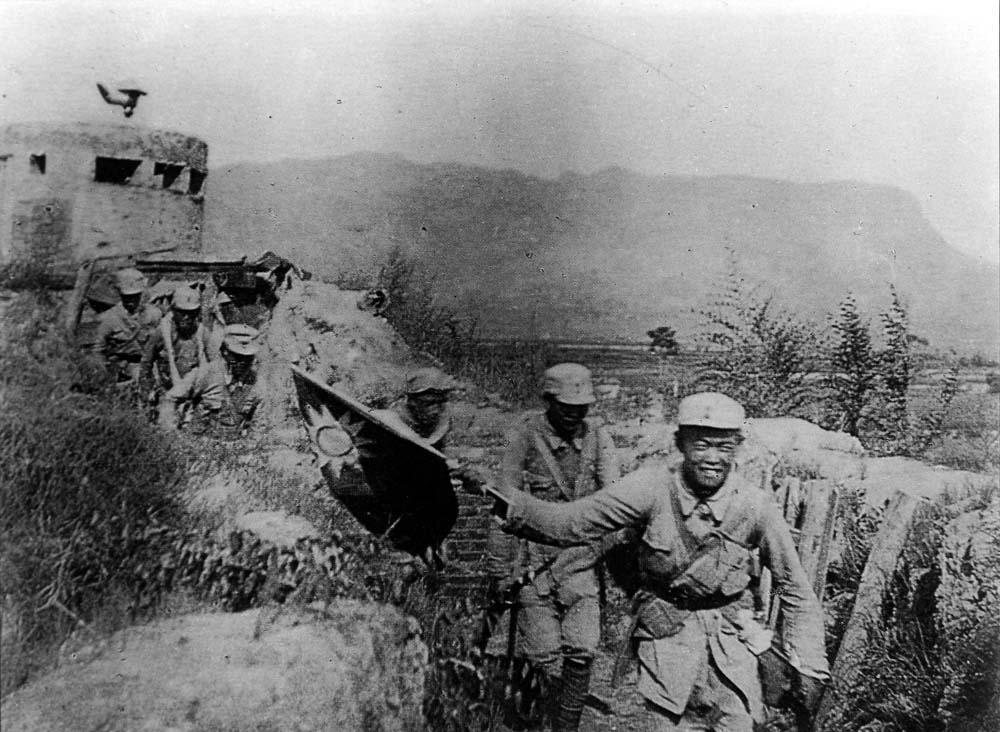
- Victorious Chinese Communist soldiers holding the flag of the Republic of China.
Date	20 August 1940 – 24 January 1941 (5 months and 4 days)
Location	Shanxi, Hebei, Henan, Chahar
Result	Chinese victory

Belligerents
Republic of China: Chinese Communist Party	Empire of Japan: Wang Jingwei regime

Commanders and leaders
Peng Dehuai; Zhu De; Zuo Quan; Liu Bocheng; He Long; Nie Rongzhen; Chen Geng; Deng Xiaoping	Hayao Tada

Units involved
8th Route Army	North China Area Army; Collaborationist Chinese Army

Strength
200,000	(Empire of Japan) 270,000 Japanese troops 150,000 Chinese collaborators

Casualties and losses
22,000–100,000 (counting desertions); Chinese figure: 5,890 killed 11,700 wounded 307 missing 21,182 poisoned (some as many as five to six times)	Several record from different sources: CCP records: 1. 12,645 killed and wounded, 281 POW.; 2. 20,645 Japanese and 5,155 Chinese collaborators killed and wounded, 281 Japanese and 18,407 Chinese collaborators captured; Japanese military record: No figure about total casualties, 276 KIAs from 4th Independent Mixed Brigade. 133 KIA and 31 MIA from 2nd Independent Mixed Brigade. Western sources: 1. 20,900 Japanese casualties and about 20,000 collaborator casualties; Jay Taylor's estimate: 3,000–4,000 casualties Peng's estimate: 1. 30,000 Japanese and collaborators

The Hundred Regiments Offensive (Chinese: 百团大战) or the Hundred Regiments Campaign was a tactical campaign initiated by the Eighth Route Army, led by the Chinese Communist Party, against the Japanese invasion in North China from 20 August 1940, to 24 January 1941. The operation was named in recognition of the involvement of 105 regiments and represented the most extensive and protracted offensive by the Eighth Route Army in Japanese-occupied territory since the onset of the countrywide War of Resistance. The campaign aimed at undermining the Shijiazhuang–Taiyuan railway, a significant line under Japanese dominion, and spanned several crucial transportation corridors in North China, occurring in three distinct periods. The operation secured substantial strategic advantages, inflicted a severe setback on Japan's "prison cage policy." According to the CCP's official histories, it elevated national morale, and highlighted the crucial role of the Chinese Communist Party and its military as a cornerstone in the Second Sino-Japanese War.

== Background ==
During the summer and autumn of 1940, the circumstances of World War II experienced significant transformations. In its pursuit of a "southward expansion" policy, Japanese colonial empire escalated its efforts against the Chinese front to compel the Kuomintang government to capitulate, while concurrently directing its primary military forces towards assaults on the anti-Japanese strongholds established by the Chinese Communist Party. In North China, the Japanese army executed a severe "prison cage policy," establishing a system of railways, roadways, and fortified positions to segregate and besiege the anti-Japanese strongholds, aiming to obliterate the Eighth Route Army's foundation for existence. From 1939 to 1940, the Japanese conducted 109 extensive "mopping-up" operations, each involving over 1,000 troops, with a total deployment exceeding 500,000 soldiers, precipitating a critical situation for the anti-Japanese base regions, threatening their survival.

At the same time, the general condition of China was deteriorating. The forward battlefields endured successive defeats, and calls for peace with Japan from within the Kuomintang intensified. The Wang Jingwei faction had publicly defected and formed a puppet government. A pervasive atmosphere of pessimism, confusion, and compromise enveloped the nation, significantly undermining the morale of both the military and civilian populace. The Eighth Route Army Headquarters resolved to initiate a significant strategic operation behind enemy lines in North China to dismantle the Japanese blockade, enhance national morale, and bolster resistance on the frontlines.

== Preparations ==
On 22 July 1940, Zhu De (Commander-in-Chief of the Eighth Route Army), Peng Dehuai (Deputy Commander-in-Chief), and Zuo Quan (Deputy Chief of Staff) collaboratively released the Preliminary Battle Order, delineating the strategic objectives of the forthcoming operation. The directive specified: "To counter the enemy's 'prison cage policy', impede its progression towards Xi'an, secure advantageous conditions in the North China theater, and impact the national resistance initiative, we have resolved to exploit the concealment offered by the tall summer millet and the rainy season to initiate a substantial sabotage operation on the Shijiazhuang–Taiyuan railway (Zheng-Tai Line)." The directive mandated the involvement of at least 22 regiments from the Jin-Cha-Ji Military Region, the 129th Division, and the 120th Division. The principal objective was to "utterly obliterate critical locations along the Zheng-Tai Line" and to "sever the railway for an extended duration."

On 8 August, the Eighth Route Army HQ issued the Operational Battle Order, further clarifying the strategic deployment. The Jin-Cha-Ji Military Region was designated to assault the eastern segment of the Zheng-Tai Railway (from Niangzi Pass to Shijiazhuang); the 129th Division was allocated the western segment (from Niangzi Pass to Yuci); and the 120th Division was instructed to target the northern segment of the Tongpu Railway and the Fen–Li Highway. The directive mandated that all troops commence combat operations on 20 August and underscored that "the success of the campaign shall be evaluated chiefly by the degree of destruction inflicted on the Zheng-Tai Line."

In a state of stringent confidentiality, the diverse factions of the Eighth Route Army conducted comprehensive preparations before to the campaign. Reconnaissance teams, camouflaged and shielded by local villagers, were deployed deep into regions adjacent to the Shijiazhuang–Taiyuan railway to meticulously chart Japanese stronghold locations, troop arrangements, and topographical characteristics. Simultaneously, local military and civilian populations were mobilized to accumulate grain, ammunition, and tools for railway sabotage, with blacksmiths specifically organized to fabricate crowbars, pickaxes, and other essential equipment. Specialized military training encompassed demolition techniques and railway deconstruction, incorporating tactics such as the heating and bending of steel rails. Civilian mobilization was pivotal: militias and support teams were established to undertake tasks including transportation, medical assistance, and coordination with military units—over 10,000 militia members were mobilized in the Central Shanxi region alone. The Eighth Route Army headquarters underscored the need for operational confidentiality, asserting: "Prior to the commencement of battle, the strategy must remain strictly classified; until preparations are finalized, the campaign's objective shall be revealed solely to brigade-level commanders." Concealed by thick summer millet, troops clandestinely gathered in their assigned operational zones.

== Battle ==
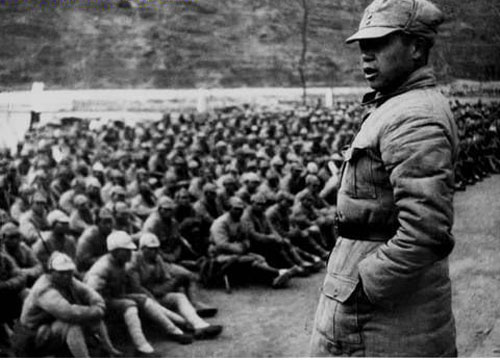
In May 1940, Chen Xilian (commander of the 385th Brigade of the 129th Division) conducted combat mobilization in battle preparation.

The Japanese North China Area Army estimated the strength of communist regulars to be about 88,000 in December 1939. Two years later, they revised the estimate to 140,000. On the eve of the battle, the Communist forces grew to 200,000 to 400,000 men strong, in 105 regiments.

By 1940, growth was so impressive that Zhu De ordered a coordinated offensive by most of the communist regulars (46 regiments from the 115th Division, 47 from the 129th, and 22 from the 120th) against the Japanese-held cities and the railway lines linking them. According to the Communist Party's official statement, the battle started on 20 August.

=== First Phase (20 August – 10 September 1940) ===
On the night of August 20, the Eighth Route Army initiated a synchronized offensive spanning thousands of kilometers along the North China front. Gunfire and explosions abruptly resonated along the Shijiazhuang–Taiyuan Railway; signal flares illuminated the night sky as the primary units of the Eighth Route Army, aided by local militias, assaulted Japanese fortifications, railway stations, and bridges.

Forces from the Jin-Cha-Ji Military Region executed an offensive from three flanks: the right contingent seized the pivotal Niangzi Pass and obliterated a railway bridge; the central contingent conducted an unexpected assault on the Jingxing coal mine (Chinese: 井陉煤矿), collaborating with miners to entirely dismantle the mining infrastructure, thereby suspending operations for more than six months; the left contingent undermined the railway connecting Weishui and Shijiazhuang. In the intense confrontation at Jingxing, Eighth Route Army soldiers confronted enemy fire and utilized doors and blankets to shield electric fences, sacrificing their lives to provide a passage for their army to progress.

Simultaneously, the 129th Division won swift victories along the western segment of the Shijiazhuang–Taiyuan Railway. The left wing secured multiple stations, including Lujiazhuang, Shanghu, and Mashou, but the right flank captured Sanzhang and Yanzigou, demolishing several railway bridges. The 14th Regiment secured the elevated position at Shinaoshan to facilitate railway sabotage operations, successfully defending it against multiple assaults by Japanese forces from Yangquan. During the six-day confrontation, the men subsisted on black beans, corn husks, and vegetable soup, successfully repelling numerous Japanese attacks and eliminating over 400 adversaries.

Simultaneously, the 120th Division initiated offensives along the northern segment of the Datong–Puzhou railway, severing several sections of railway and road, therefore successfully obstructing Japanese reinforcements from accessing the Zheng-Tai Line.

On 21 August, the 8th Company of the 25th Regiment, 1st Death-Defying Column, was ambushed by Japanese forces at Daluopo Village (大落坡村). The soldiers engaged in intense hand-to-hand combat, killing more than 40 Japanese soldiers, including a platoon leader, effectively shattering the myth that the Eighth Route Army could not match Japanese troops in bayonet fighting. For their valor, the company was awarded the honorary title of "Bayonet Combat Hero Company" (Chinese: 白刃格斗英雄连) by Eighth Route Army headquarters.

The original campaign plan specified the deployment of 22 regiments; however, the considerable excitement among participating units resulted in a swift growth to 105 regiments, totaling about 200,000 troops. On August 26, leaders Peng Dehuai and Zuo Quan officially designated the operation as the "Hundred Regiments Offensive." Within 20 days, the Eighth Route Army accomplished its goal of "leaving no rail, sleeper, station, bunker, or bridge intact," therefore incapacitating the whole Zheng-Tai Railway.

=== Second Phase (September 22 – Early October 1940) ===
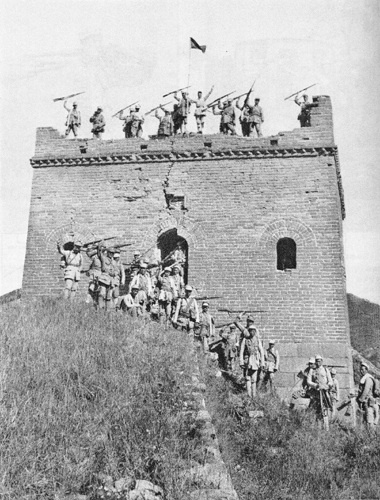
After the victory at Dongtuanbao during the Laiyuan–Lingqiu Campaign, Eighth Route Army soldiers cheered triumphantly atop the Great Wall.

On 22 September the Eighth Route Army HQ issued directives to commence the second phase of the assault, concentrating on seizing Japanese strongholds situated along critical transportation corridors and within the central zones of the anti-Japanese base regions.

In the Jin-Cha-Ji Military Region, soldiers initiated the Laiyuan–Lingqiu Campaign, aiming to neutralize Japanese positions in the Laiyuan and Lingqiu regions. In the assault of Dongtuanbao, the Eighth Route Army obliterated the Japanese Non-Commissioned Officers' Training Battalion and captured this strategically significant site. Simultaneously, the 129th Division executed the Yushe–Liaoxian Campaign, focusing on fortified positions along the Yushe–Liaoxian highway. During these arduous offensives, soldiers progressed under severe artillery bombardment, excavating communication trenches with shovels and pickaxes to reposition themselves within mere dozens of meters of Japanese bunkers. A significant number of demolition personnel perished in combat during these valiant assaults. The 120th Division once more focused on the northern segment of the Tongpu Railway, hindering Japanese attempts to restore vital trade routes.

At this point in the campaign, Japanese forces had grown more alert, depending on fortified defenses and employing chemical warfare to counter the onslaught.

=== Third Phase (6 October 1940 – 24 January 1941) ===
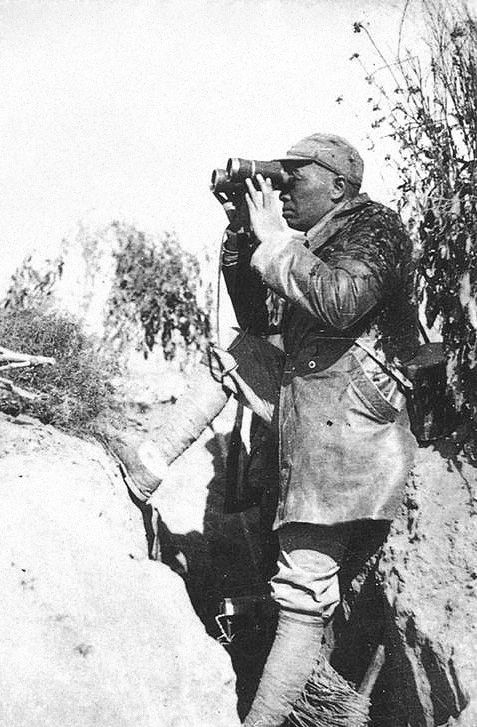
Peng Dehuai directed the battle from an artillery observation post on the Guanjia'nao front line.

In early October, the Japanese army mobilized tens of thousands of troops to launch retaliatory "sweep" operations across the anti-Japanese base areas in North China. These operations were marked by the brutal implementation of the purported "Three Alls Policy"—burn all, kill all, loot all. In response, the Eighth Route Army shifted to counter-sweep operations, relying on mobile guerrilla tactics to wear down the exhausted enemy forces.

During the Battle of Guanjianao, commander Peng Dehuai personally arrived at the front line, only 500 meters from the enemy, to direct operations. A fierce and bloody struggle ensued between Eighth Route Army forces and Japanese troops. Peng Dehuai led the 386th Brigade of the 129th Division, 25th and 38th Regiments of the 1st Death-Defying Column, New 10th Brigade, and units directly under the headquarters to besiege the roughly 500-strong Okazaki Detachment (Note: At times has been shortened to the "O Detachment") under the 4th Independent Mixed Brigade on 29 October. After two days and nights of fierce fighting, the Chinese Army had to retreat due to the arrival of Japanese reinforcements. The Okazaki Detachment was relieved on 1 November but not before Lieutenant Colonel Kenju Okazaki (Note: 岡崎謙受) was killed in action. The Eighth Route Army suffered heavy casualties in this battle. The 25th and 38th Regiments, as the main attacking forces, lost 500 men and another 1,570 were wounded. According to Japanese internal record, the Okazaki Detachment suffered 50 (including 5 officers) killed and 99 (including 5 officers) wounded at Guanjianao, accounting for more than 60% of the total losses of the 4th Independent Mixed Brigade from 19 October until 14 November 1940. This is contrary to the CCP's claim that most combatants of the Detachment have been wiped out in the battle. Kuomintang records, including a telegram from Wei Lihuang to Jiang Jieshi, appeared to corroborate the CCP's claims. General Peng himself was said to have later considered Guanjianao to be one of the four major defeats in his military career.

The counter-sweep operations lasted until January 1941. Although the Eighth Route Army inflicted significant casualties on the Japanese, the anti-Japanese base areas suffered heavy losses. In regions such as the Taihang, Taiyue, and northwest Shanxi, Japanese forces carried out widespread burning, looting, and killing in an effort to destroy the basic living conditions of the military and civilian populations in the liberated zones.

== Casualties ==
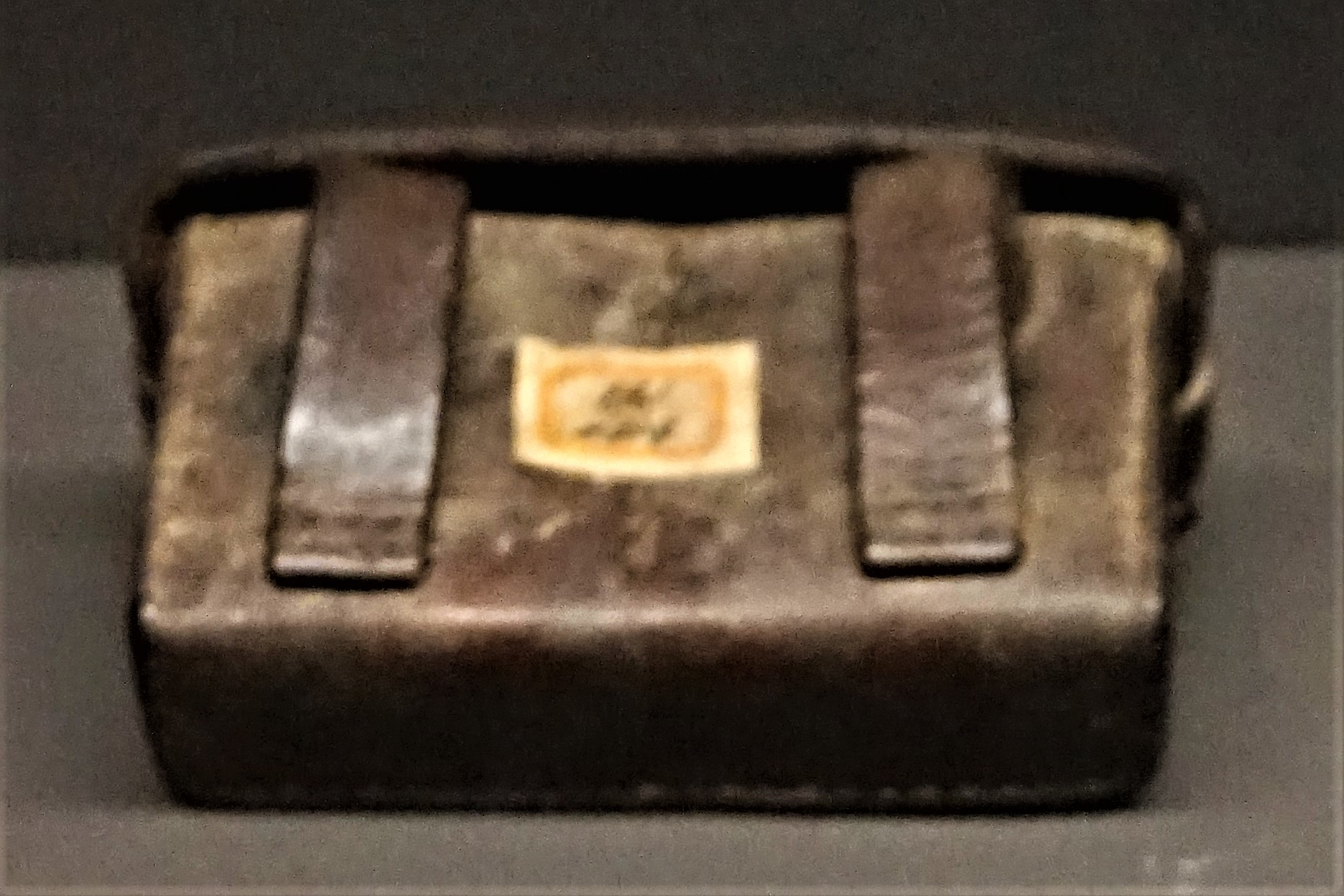
The Eighth Route Army captured a Japanese ammunition pouch in July 1940, which was later preserved in the National Museum of China.

The Eighth Army had left two reports, both of which were based on statistics from before December 5. One claimed the killing or injuring of 12,645 Japanese and 5,153 puppet troops; the capturing of 281 Japanese and 1,407 puppet troops; the defection of 7 Japanese and 1,845 puppet troops; and 293 strong-points taken. The other one claimed the killing or injuring of 20,645 Japanese and 5,155 puppet troops; the capturing of 281 Japanese and 18,407 puppet troops; the defection of 47 Japanese and 1,845 puppet troops; and 2,993 strongpoints taken. The records were based on the same figures but split into two records for unknown reasons. That amounted to 21,338 and 46,000 combat successes, respectively. In 2010, a Chinese article by Pan Zeqin said that the combat success result should be more than 50,000. There are no figures concerning total casualties in Japanese military records but 276 KIAs were recorded for the 4th Independent Mixed Brigade and 133 KIAs and 31 MIAs for the 2nd Independent Mixed Brigade. A western source recorded 20,900 Japanese casualties and about 20,000 collaborator casualties.

According to the medical department of the North China Front Army, the Japanese Army in North China suffered 2,349 killed and 4,004 wounded from August to December 1940. This casualty figure included losses of units not involved in the operation such as the 12th Army in Shandong province, and of the armies which was part of the operational zone, there were also losses facing Nationalist guerrillas. For example, the North China Front Army suffered 739 killed, 1,319 wounded, and 66 missing in September including 100 killed, 173 wounded, and 4 missing from the 12th Army. The First Army, which was the most involved in the Hundred Regiments Offensive and suffered the most casualties with 402 killed and 790 wounded in September 1940, recorded the largest operation that month was the Central Shanxi Operation against the 129th Division and other units of the Communist Eighth Route Army from September 1 to September 11, where the First Army claimed 4,880 abandoned enemy corpses and 263 POWs while suffering 200 killed, 283 wounded, and 9 missing. The second largest operation of the First Army was the Japanese 36th Division's counterattack from September 11 to September 18 where, with the support of 51 aircraft, the unit engaged with the 9th, 27th, and 93rd Armies of the Nationalist First War Zone, claiming 759 abandoned enemy corpses and 30 POWs while suffering 89 killed and 153 wounded.

The Chinese also recorded 474 km of railway and 1502 km of road sabotaged, 213 bridges and 11 tunnels blown up, and 37 stations destroyed, but Japanese records give 73 bridges, 3 tunnels, and 5 water towers blown up; 20 stations burned, and 117 incidents of railway sabotage (amounting to 44 km). The damage done to communication systems consisted of 1,333 cable posts cut down and 1,107 turned over, with up to 146 km of cable cut. One mining site of Jingxing Coal Mine also stopped operating for half a year.

== Outcome ==
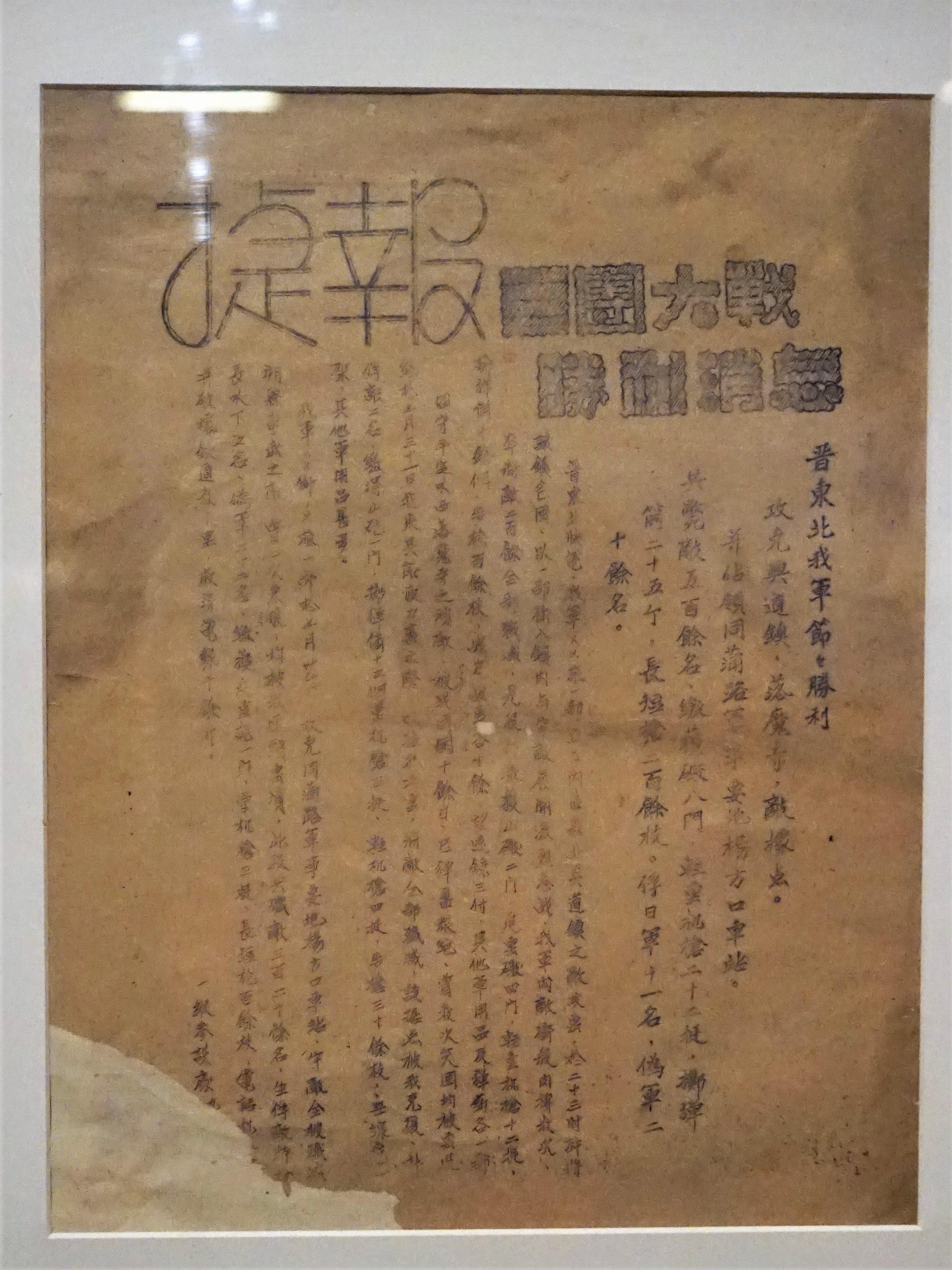
In September 1940, the First Column General Staff Office issued a victory report titled "News of the Victory of the Hundred Regiments Campaign."

The Hundred Regiments Offensive inflicted a substantial setback on the Japanese "cage policy," incapacitating the transportation infrastructure in North China. Japanese military records recognized that "losses were substantial, and recovery would necessitate an extended period and significant financial resources," compelling Japan to defer its southward expansion strategy and shift its operational emphasis to quelling Communist troops in North China. In CPC histography, the campaign effectively dispelled the notion that the Eighth Route Army "only maneuvered but did not engage in combat," thus elevating the stature of both the Chinese Communist Party and the Eighth Route Army. Xinhua News Agency disseminated a series of victory reports during the campaign, inciting public enthusiasm. Civilians commemorated the victory by embellishing returning soldiers with "flowers of honor," fostering a happy and festive atmosphere. According to the official history of the Chinese Communist Party, the campaign significantly elevated the morale of the Chinese military and public during a time of national adversity, and it was regarded as a pivotal moment in alleviating the widespread sense of hopelessness. The operation garnered significant acclaim from the global anti-fascist coalition.

=== Controversies ===
Peng and Mao had disagreed over how directly to confront the Japanese since at least the Luochuan Conference in August 1937, with Mao concerned about Communist losses to the well-equipped Japanese. During the Great Leap Forward, Peng's opposition to Mao's policies led to his downfall and then the launching of the battle became yet again a criminal action in the Cultural Revolution. In 1967, the Red Guard group of Tsinghua University, with the support of the Central Cultural Revolution Committee, issued a leaflet saying, "The rogue Peng, along with Zhu De, launched the offensive to defend Chongqing and Xi'an... he rejected Chairman Mao's instruction and mobilized 105 regiments in an adventuristic impulse... Chairman Mao said, 'How can Peng Dehuai make such a big move without consulting me? Our forces are completely revealed. The result will be terrible.'"

Peng was tried unfairly from 1950s, because he was charged for launching a war without the permission from the CMC. However, Zhang Xueqin (张学勤; Phoenix News reporter) wrote that this offensive should have been launched before 10 days (on 10 August that is regulated in Order of Military Preparation (战役预备命令)), not after 10 days. This proves that this war was known by CMC.

Nie Rongzhen defended Peng by stating "there is a legend that the Central Military Committee was not informed about the offensive in advance. After investigation, we found out that Eighth Army HQ sent a report to the top. The report mentioned we would strike at and sabotage Zhentai Railway. Sabotaging one railway or another is very common in guerilla warfare so it's our routine work. This is not some strategic issue, and the Committee won't say no." He mentioned no exact date of launch. The consensus in China after the Cultural Revolution is generally in support of the battle.

== Commemorations ==
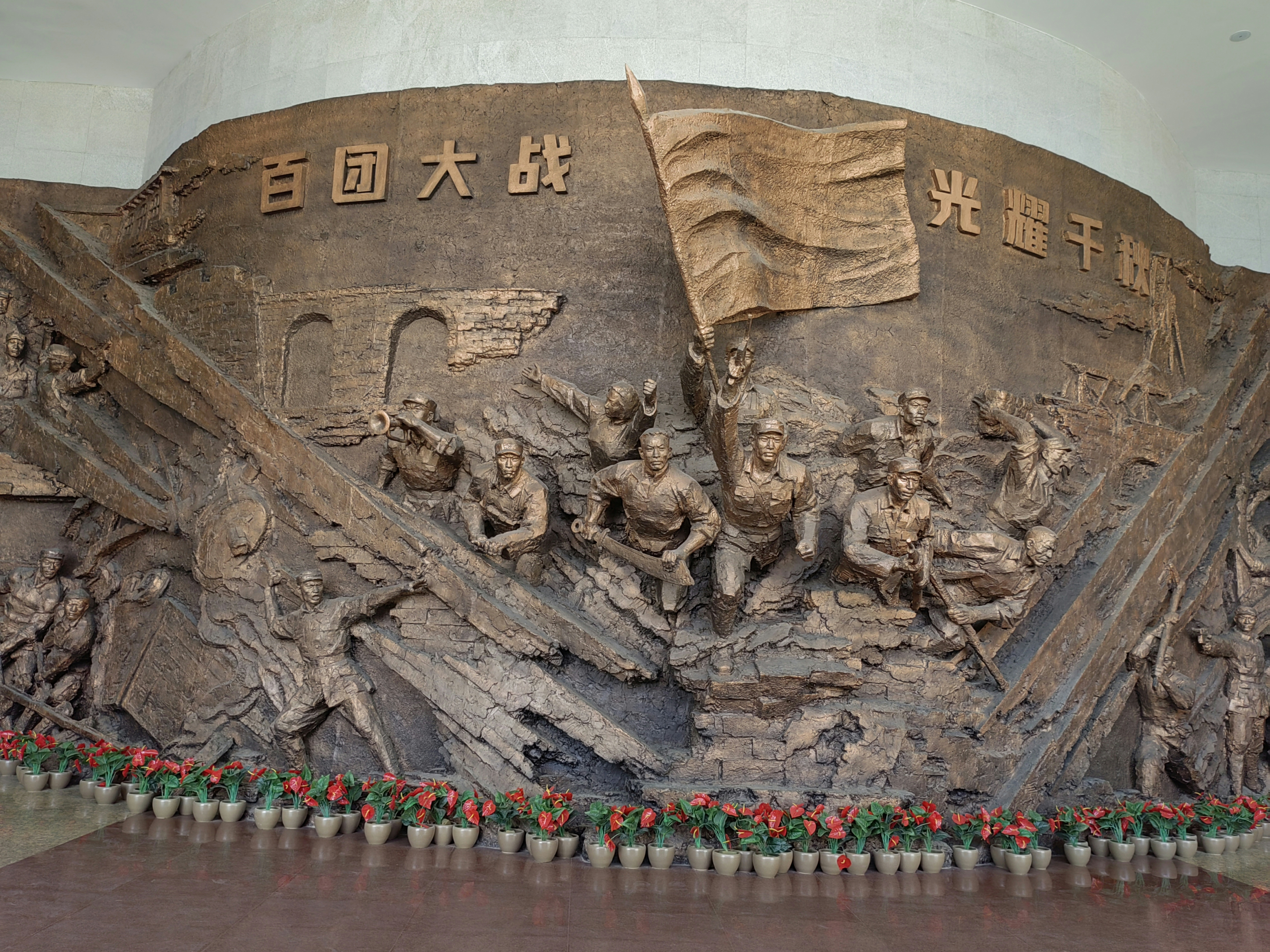
Relief sculpture in the hall of the Memorial Museum of the Hundred Regiments Offensive, Shanxi.

The Hundred Regiments Offensive is a pivotal moment in the Second Sino-Japanese War, demonstrating the considerable power of the anti-Japanese national united front promoted by the Chinese Communist Party. A memorial was erected in 1987 at the peak of Shinao Mountain in Yangquan, Shanxi Province, to commemorate this significant offensive.

In 2010, a new edifice for the Hundred Regiments Offensive Memorial Hall was finalized, containing an extensive assemblage of historical artifacts and documents, including actual directives issued by Zhu De, Peng Dehuai, and Zuo Quan concerning the intended destruction of the Shijiazhuang-Taiyuan Railway. In 2015, at the military parade commemorating the 2015 China Victory Day Parade, the "Bayonet Combat Hero Company" was recognized as part of the heroic unit formation, perpetuating the lasting memory of the Hundred Regiments Offensive.

On the afternoon of 7 July 2025, Xi Jinping, General Secretary of the Chinese Communist Party, visited Yangquan, Shanxi Province to lay a wreath in honor of the martyrs of the Hundred Regiments Offensive and to tour the Hundred Regiments Offensive Memorial Hall.

== See also ==
- Hundred Regiments Offensive (film)

== Sources ==
- The Battle of One Hundred Regiments, from Kataoka, Tetsuya; Resistance and Revolution in China: The Communists and the Second United Front. Berkeley: University of California Press, [1974].
- 森松俊夫 「中国戦線 百団大戦の敗北と勝利」(Morimatsu Toshio: Chinese Front: The Defeat and Victory of Hundred Regiment Offensive)『増刊 歴史と人物 137号 秘録・太平洋戦争』 中央公論社、1982年。
- van Slyke, Lyman (October 1996). "The Battle of the Hundred Regiments". Modern Asian Studies. 30 (4): 979–1005. doi:10.1017/s0026749x00016863. S2CID 145553713.
