= Zuoquan County =

Coordinates: 37°04′53″N 113°22′49″E

Zuoquan 左权县 Tsochuan
- County
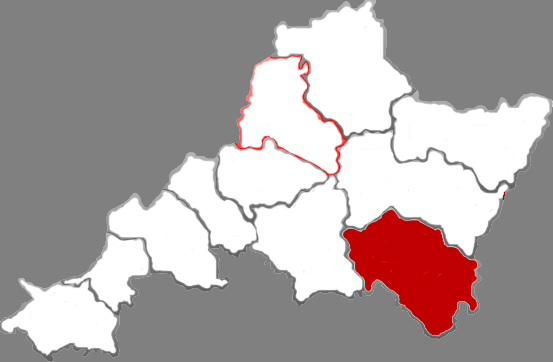
- Zuoquan in Jinzhong

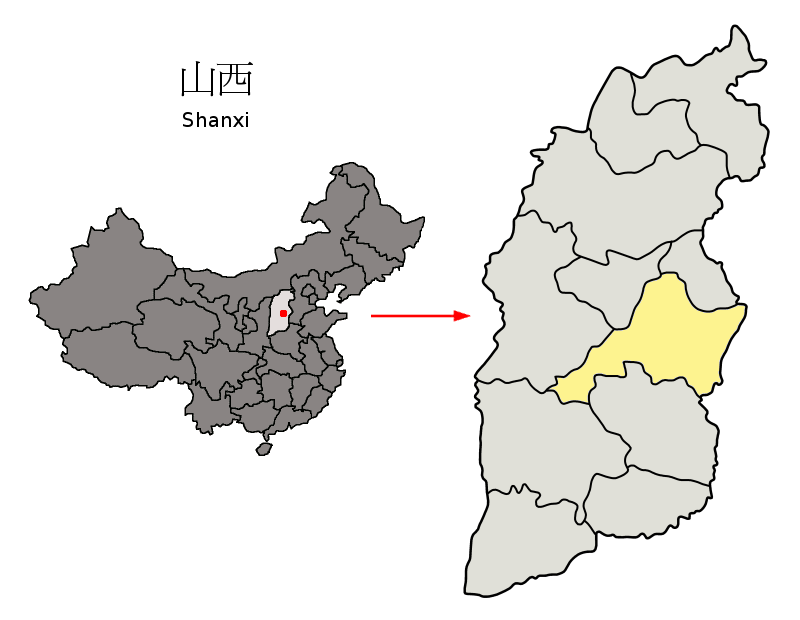
- Jinzhong in Shanxi
- Country: People's Republic of China
- Province: Shanxi
- Prefecture-level city: Jinzhong

Population (2020)
  - Total: 144,519
- Time zone: UTC+8 (China Standard)

Zuoquan County (simplified Chinese: 左权县; traditional Chinese: 左權縣; pinyin: Zuǒquán Xiàn) is a county in the east of Shanxi Province of China, bordering Hebei Province to the east. It is under the administration of the prefecture-level city of Jinzhong.

After Communist general Zuo Quan was killed in action during World War II, the CCP renamed the Liao County in Shanxi Province to Zuoquan County, in his honor.

== Climate ==
Climate data for Zuoquan, elevation 1,153 m (3,783 ft), (1991–2020 normals, extremes 1981–2010)
Month	Jan	Feb	Mar	Apr	May	Jun	Jul	Aug	Sep	Oct	Nov	Dec	Year
Record high °C (°F)	15.5 (59.9)	21.7 (71.1)	26.9 (80.4)	33.5 (92.3)	35.6 (96.1)	38.7 (101.7)	37.3 (99.1)	33.4 (92.1)	33.0 (91.4)	27.0 (80.6)	24.3 (75.7)	17.5 (63.5)	38.7 (101.7)
Mean daily maximum °C (°F)	2.3 (36.1)	5.4 (41.7)	11.3 (52.3)	18.4 (65.1)	23.6 (74.5)	27.1 (80.8)	28.1 (82.6)	26.6 (79.9)	22.3 (72.1)	16.6 (61.9)	9.7 (49.5)	3.4 (38.1)	16.2 (61.2)
Daily mean °C (°F)	−7.0 (19.4)	−3.2 (26.2)	2.8 (37.0)	9.9 (49.8)	15.5 (59.9)	19.4 (66.9)	21.4 (70.5)	20.0 (68.0)	14.9 (58.8)	8.4 (47.1)	1.1 (34.0)	−5.5 (22.1)	8.1 (46.6)
Mean daily minimum °C (°F)	−13.8 (7.2)	−9.9 (14.2)	−4.1 (24.6)	2.4 (36.3)	7.8 (46.0)	12.8 (55.0)	16.4 (61.5)	15.2 (59.4)	9.5 (49.1)	2.4 (36.3)	−4.9 (23.2)	−11.8 (10.8)	1.8 (35.3)
Record low °C (°F)	−25.6 (−14.1)	−24.4 (−11.9)	−17.6 (0.3)	−9.6 (14.7)	−2.7 (27.1)	3.2 (37.8)	8.7 (47.7)	6.1 (43.0)	−1.9 (28.6)	−9.3 (15.3)	−20.7 (−5.3)	−28.6 (−19.5)	−28.6 (−19.5)
Average precipitation mm (inches)	2.7 (0.11)	6.3 (0.25)	8.8 (0.35)	26.0 (1.02)	37.1 (1.46)	68.6 (2.70)	149.1 (5.87)	109.1 (4.30)	59.0 (2.32)	32.4 (1.28)	14.3 (0.56)	3.3 (0.13)	516.7 (20.35)
Average precipitation days (≥ 0.1 mm)	2.8	3.7	4.2	6.0	7.7	11.6	14.8	12.3	9.0	6.6	4.4	2.7	85.8
Average snowy days	4.3	5.6	4.0	1.1	0	0	0	0	0	0.3	3.4	4.1	22.8
Average relative humidity (%)	55	54	50	50	53	63	75	77	74	68	63	57	62
Mean monthly sunshine hours	179.8	177.7	208.7	235.4	259.0	224.5	201.9	195.6	176.8	187.4	177.0	179.4	2,403.2
Percentage possible sunshine	58	58	56	59	59	51	45	47	48	55	59	60	55
Source: China Meteorological Administration
