= Peng Dehuai =

Chinese politician and general (1898–1974)

Marshal Peng Dehuai
- 彭德怀
- Peng in his Marshal uniform, 1955

1st Minister of National Defense
- In office September 28, 1954 – September 17, 1959
- Premier: Zhou Enlai
- Preceded by: Position established
- Succeeded by: Lin Biao

Personal details
- Born: 彭清宗 (Péng Qīngzōng); October 24, 1898 Shixiang, Xiangtan County, Hunan, China
- Died: November 29, 1974 (aged 76) Beijing, People's Republic of China
- Party: Chinese Communist Party (1928–1959)
- Education: Hunan Military Academy
- Occupation: General; politician; author
- Nicknames: 彭老总 (Péng Lǎozǒng, "Old Chief Peng"); 红军之狮 (Hóng jūn zhī shī, "The Lion of the Red Army"); 彭大将军 ("Grand General Peng", addressed by Mao Zedong in his famous poem)

Military service
- Allegiance: Republic of China; People's Republic of China
- Branch/service: People's Liberation Army Ground Force; People's Volunteer Army; Chinese Workers' and Peasants' Red Army; National Revolutionary Army; Hunan clique
- Years of service: 1916–1959
- Rank: Marshal of the People's Republic of China; Lieutenant General (NRA)
- Commands: Commander, Third Corps, Chinese Red Army; Deputy Commander-in-Chief, Eighth Route Army; Deputy Commander-in-Chief, People's Liberation Army; Commander and Political Commissar, People's Volunteer Army
- Battles/wars: Northern Expedition; Chinese Civil War; Encirclement campaigns; Long March; Second Sino-Japanese War; Hundred Regiments Offensive; Korean War; Battle of Unsan; Battle of Onjong; Battle of the Ch'ongch'on River; Third Battle of Seoul
- Awards: Hero of the Republic (North Korea, 1953); Order of August 1 (First Class Medal) (China, 1955); Order of Independence and Freedom (First Class Medal) (China, 1955); Order of Liberation (First Class Medal) (China, 1955)

Chinese name
- Simplified Chinese: 彭德怀
- Traditional Chinese: 彭德懷
Transcriptions
Standard Mandarin
- Hanyu Pinyin: Péng Déhuái
- Wade–Giles: Pʻeng² Tê²-huai²
- IPA: [pʰə̌ŋ tɤ̌.xwǎɪ]
other Mandarin
- Xiao'erjing: پېڭ دېحُوَي
Yue: Cantonese
- Yale Romanization: Pàahng Dāk-wàaih
- Jyutping: Paang^{4} Dak^{1}-waai^{4}
- IPA: [pʰaŋ˩ tɐk̚˥.waj˩]

Peng Dehuai (Note: Chinese: 彭德怀; pinyin: Péng Déhuái) (October 24, 1898 – November 29, 1974; also spelled as Peng Teh-Huai) was a Chinese general and politician who was the Minister of National Defense from 1954 to 1959.

Born into a poor peasant family, Peng received several years of primary education before his family's poverty forced him to suspend his education at the age of ten, and to work for several years as a manual laborer. When he was sixteen, Peng became a professional soldier. Over the next ten years Peng served in the armies of several Hunan-based warlord armies, raising himself from the rank of private second class to major. In 1926, Peng's forces joined the Kuomintang, and Peng also got introduced to communism during this time. Peng participated in the Northern Expedition, and supported Wang Jingwei's attempt to form a left-leaning Kuomintang government based in Wuhan. After Wang was defeated, Peng briefly rejoined Chiang Kai-shek's forces before joining the Chinese Communist Party (CCP), allying himself with Mao Zedong and Zhu De.

Peng was one of the most senior generals who defended the Jiangxi Soviet from Chiang's attempts to capture it, and his successes were rivaled only by Lin Biao. Peng participated in the Long March, and supported Mao Zedong at the Zunyi Conference, which was critical for Mao's rise to power. During the 1937–1945 Second Sino-Japanese War, Peng was one of the strongest supporters of pursuing a ceasefire with the Kuomintang in order to concentrate China's collective resources on resisting the Empire of Japan. Peng was the senior commander in the combined Kuomintang-Communist efforts to resist the Japanese occupation of Shanxi in 1937; and, by 1938, was in command of two-thirds of the Eighth Route Army. In 1940, Peng conducted the Hundred Regiments Offensive, a massive Communist effort to disrupt Japanese logistical networks across northern China. The Hundred Regiments Offensive was modestly successful, but political disputes within the Communist Party led to Peng being recalled to Yan'an, and he spent the rest of the war without being in active command. After the Japanese surrendered, in 1945, Peng was given command of Communist forces in Northwest China. He was the most senior commander responsible for defending the Communist leadership in Shaanxi from Kuomintang forces, saving Mao from being captured at least once. Peng eventually defeated the Kuomintang in Northwest China, captured huge amounts of military supplies, and actively incorporated the huge area, including Xinjiang, into the People's Republic of China.

Peng was one of the few senior military leaders who supported Mao's suggestion to involve China directly in the 1950–1953 Korean War, and he served as the direct commander of the Chinese People's Volunteer Army for the first half of the war (though Mao and Zhou Enlai were technically more senior). Peng's experiences in the Korean War convinced him that the Chinese military had to become more professional, organized, and well-equipped in order to prepare itself for the conditions of modern technical warfare. Because the Soviet Union was the only communist country then equipped with a fully modern, professional army, Peng attempted to reform China's military on the Soviet model over the next several years, making the army less political and more professional (contrary to the political goals of Mao). Peng resisted Mao's attempts to develop a personality cult throughout the 1950s; and, when Mao's economic policies associated with the Great Leap Forward caused a nationwide famine, Peng became critical of Mao's leadership. The rivalry between Peng and Mao culminated in an open confrontation between the two at the 1959 Lushan Conference. Mao won the confrontation, labeling Peng as a leader of an "anti-Party clique", and purging Peng from all influential positions for the rest of his life.

Peng lived in virtual obscurity until 1965, when the reformers Liu Shaoqi and Deng Xiaoping supported Peng's limited return to government for developing military industries in Southwest China. In 1966, during the advent of the Cultural Revolution, Peng was arrested by the Red Guards. From 1966 to 1970, radical factions within the CCP, led by Lin Biao and Mao's wife, Jiang Qing, singled out Peng for national persecution, and Peng was publicly humiliated in numerous large-scale struggle sessions and subjected to physical and psychological torture in organized efforts to force Peng to confess his "crimes" against Mao Zedong and the CCP. In 1970, Peng was formally tried and sentenced to life imprisonment, and he died in prison in 1974. After Mao died in 1976, Peng's old ally, Deng Xiaoping, emerged as China's paramount leader. Deng led an effort to formally rehabilitate people who he believed to have been unjustly persecuted during the Cultural Revolution, and Peng was one of the first leaders to be posthumously rehabilitated, in 1978. In modern China, Peng is considered one of the most successful and highly respected generals in the history of the CCP.

== Early life ==
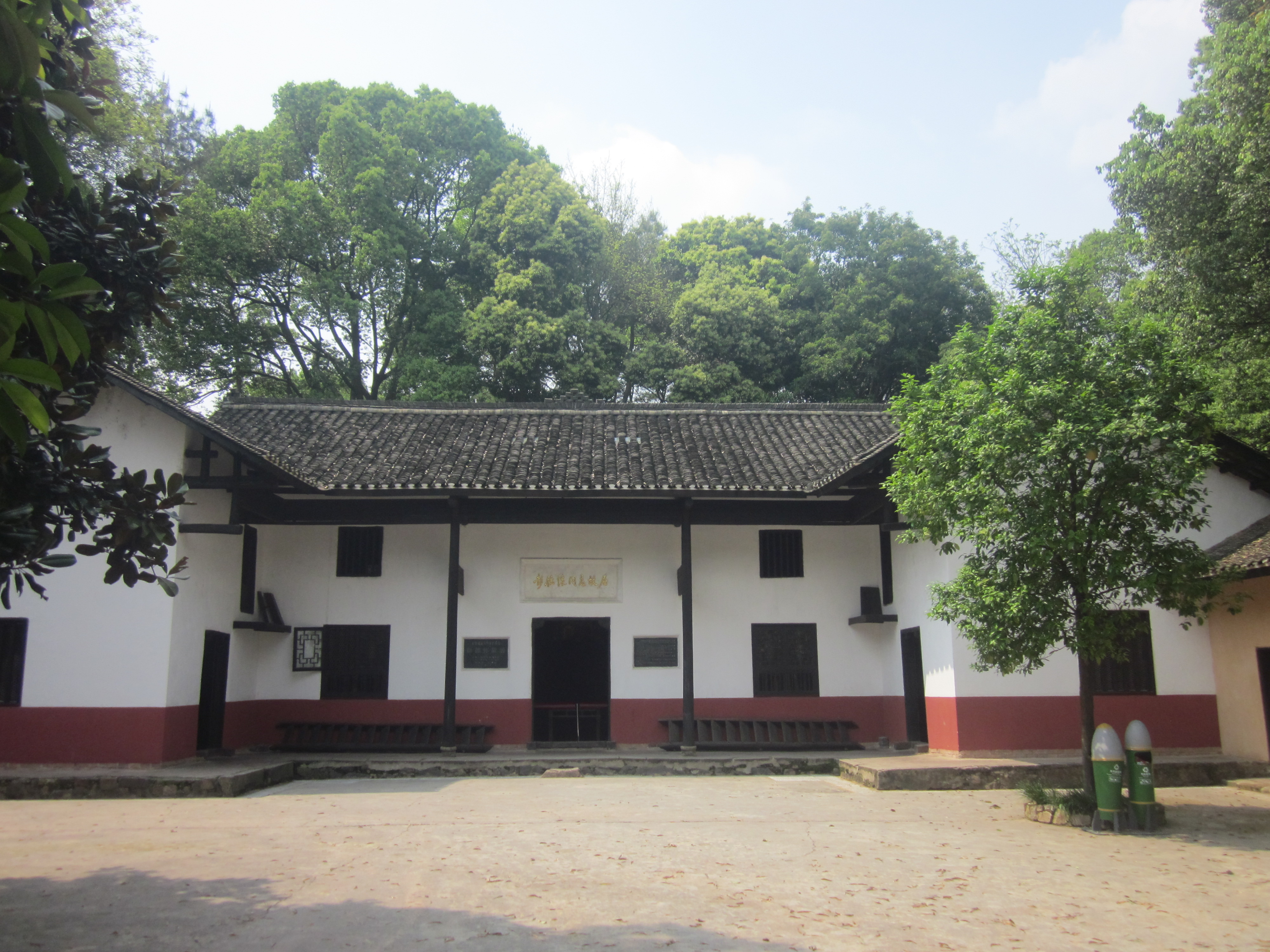
Former Residence of Peng Dehuai in the town of Wushi

Peng was born on October 24, 1898, in the village of Shixiang, Xiangtan County, Hunan. His birth name was "Peng Dehua". Peng's family lived in a thatched-straw hut and owned approximately 1.5 acres of irrigated land on which the family grew bamboo, sweet potatoes, tea, cotton, and various vegetables. His father also operated a bean curd shop. The income from the land and shop supported an extended family of eight people, including Peng, his three brothers, his parents, his grandmother, and a grand-uncle. Peng's grand-uncle had joined and fought for the Taiping Rebellion and used to tell Peng about the old Taiping ideals: everyone should have enough food to eat, women should not bind their feet, and land should be redistributed equally. Peng later described his own class background as "lower-middle peasant".

From 1905 to 1907, Peng was enrolled in a traditional Confucian primary school. In 1908, Peng attended a modern primary school but at the age of ten was forced to withdraw from this school because of his family's deteriorating financial situation. In 1905 to 1906, there was a severe drought in Hunan. Peng's mother died in 1905, and Peng's six-month-old brother died of hunger. Peng's father was forced to sell most of his family possessions for food and to pawn most of his family's land. When Peng was withdrawn from school in 1908, he and his brothers were sent to beg for food in their village. From 1908 to 1910, Peng took work on looking after a pair of water buffaloes.

When Peng's grand-uncle died in 1911, Peng left home and worked at a coalmine in Xiangtan, where he pushed carts of coal for a wage of nine yuan a month. In 1912, shortly after the founding of the Republic of China, the mine went bankrupt and the owners fled, which cheated Peng out of half his annual wages. Peng returned home in 1912 and took a number of odd jobs. In 1913, Hunan suffered another drought and famine, and Peng participated in a public demonstration that escalated into the seizure of a grain merchant's storehouse and the redistribution of grain among the peasants. Village police issued a warrant for Peng's arrest, and he fled to northern Hunan, where he worked for two years as a construction laborer for the construction of a dam near Dongting Lake. When the dam was completed in 1916, Peng assumed that he was no longer in danger of being arrested and returned home and joined the army of a local Kuomintang-aligned warlord, Tang Xiangming.

== Early military service ==
=== Service in warlord armies ===
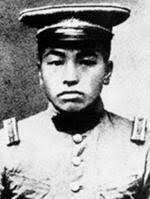
Peng at the Hunan Military Academy (1923)

At the time, the minimum age of enlistment in Hunan was 18. Peng was able to join in March 1916 at the age of 17 as a private second class soldier. This may be why his year of birth is sometimes given as 1897 not 1898. Peng received a monthly wage, a portion of which he would continuously send back to support his family. Within seven months, he was promoted to private first class. One of Peng's commanding officers was an idealistic Nationalist who had participated in the 1911 Xinhai Revolution and influenced Peng to sympathize with the Kuomintang's goals of social reform and national reunification. After another civil war broke out in 1917, Peng's regiment split from the rest of its army and joined the forces of Tang Shengzhi, who was aligned with Tan Yankai and Sun Yat-sen against those aligned with the northern warlord Wu Peifu. Peng received training in formal tactics from an officer in his brigade and education in written classical Chinese. In July 1918, Peng was captured on a reconnaissance mission behind enemy lines, but he was released after two weeks. In April 1919, Peng was promoted to master sergeant and acting platoon commander. Tang Shengzhi's forces drove enemy troops out of Hunan in July 1920 and captured the provincial capital of Changsha.

Peng participated in a failed mutiny over pay but was ultimately pardoned along with other rebels, because there was a shortage of soldiers at the time. In August 1921, Peng was promoted to the rank of second lieutenant and became acting company commander several weeks later. Stationed in a village in Nanxian, Peng noticed that the poor were being mistreated by a local landlord, and he encouraged them to establish an "association to help the poor". When the local villagers hesitated, Peng ordered his soldiers to arrest the landlord and execute him. Peng was reprimanded for his actions but not demoted or reassigned. After that incident, Peng began to consider seriously leaving the service of his provincial warlord army. In February 1922, after applying for extended unpaid leave, Peng and several other officers traveled to Guangdong to seek employment in the army of the Kuomintang.

Peng's impression of the Kuomintang in 1922 was not favorable, and he left Guangzhou with the intention of settling back in Hunan as a farmer. Peng returned to his home village by sea via Shanghai, the farthest that he had ever been from his home village, and farmed with his father for three months on land that his father had bought with money sent home by Peng, but Peng did not find that occupation to be satisfying.

After one of Peng's old comrades had suggested that Peng apply to the local Hunan Military Academy to seek employment as a formally-trained professional officer, Peng accepted. Peng successfully gained admission in August 1922 and used the personal name "Dehuai" for the first time. In August 1923, after nine months of training, Peng graduated from the academy and rejoined his old regiment with the rank of captain. He was promoted to acting battalion commander in April 1924.

In 1924, Tang's army aligned with northern warlords against the Guangdong warlord allied with the Kuomintang. Nonetheless, Peng reorganized his battalion along pro-Kuomintang political lines in 1925. In late 1925, Chiang Kai-shek established the National Revolutionary Army (NRA) and led the Kuomintang to take control of Guangdong. Tang then realigned himself with Chiang in 1926. After Wu Peifu drove Tang out of Changsha, Chiang ordered the NRA to relieve Tang and began the Northern Expedition, an effort to unify China by defeating the northern warlords. Tang's forces were incorporated into the NRA, and Peng was promoted to the rank of major. Peng himself did not become a formal member of the Kuomintang. He first heard of the CCP in 1925.

=== Kuomintang officer ===
Between July 1926 and March 1927, Peng campaigned in Hunan, participating in the capture of Changsha and Wuhan. Under General He Jian, Peng participated in the battle of Fengtai, in which Kuomintang forces decisively defeated the warlord Wu Peifu. In 1927, Wang Jingwei attempted to establish a left-leaning Kuomintang government in Wuhan, causing a split with the center/right-leaning government in Nanking. Tang Shengzhi aligned himself with the Wuhan government, and Peng was promoted to lieutenant-colonel. However, Tang's forces were defeated by Chiang. During their retreat in 1928, He Jian, under whom Peng served, defected to the Nanking side. Peng became a full colonel after the reorganization.

In 1927, Peng was approached several times by Chinese Communist Party (CCP) members, including some of his old friends. The communists' persistent push for land redistribution resonated with his childhood experience of poverty. Peng was also disappointed by the left-right split within the Kuomintang and the in-fighting among Chiang Kai-shek's own forces. In October, Peng was approached by Duan Dechang, a CCP representative, but Peng could not make up his mind at the time. He met with Duan again later that month, however, and began studying basic communist theory. Albeit secretly, Peng became a member of the CCP no later than April 1928.

After his superior officer He Jian defected to Chiang's forces, Peng was stationed in the mountainous Pingjiang County, northwest of Changsha, in May 1928. His orders were to eliminate local groups of communist guerrillas who had fled to the area after the Shanghai massacre of 1927. Peng kept his unit passive and began organizing local party branches with other secret members of the CCP within his own troops. His forces then executed the county magistrate and landlords, formed a local soviet, and incorporated themselves within the Chinese Red Army. Following a prolonged defeat at the hands of He Jian, who still served the KMT, Peng retreated to Jinggangshan to join Mao Zedong and Zhu De.

Political scientist Jürgen Domes wrote that like many other young men at the time, Peng's social consciousness was awakened by their experience of impoverishment and sharpened by the disappointment they felt with the Kuomintang (KMT) for not completely following through with its revolution after the Qing dynasty was overthrown. Communist-leaning cadres of the Kuomintang were some of the most ardent advocates of the KMT party platform, which had called for national sovereignty, eradication of warlordism, a welfare state, and equal distribution of land. After Chiang split with Wang and re-ingratiated himself with the warlords, Peng and others felt that the CCP was the only major force that represented what they had been fighting for. More advanced communist doctrines and ideological considerations do not appear to have played a significant role.

== Red Army commander ==
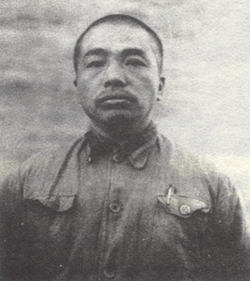
By his mid-thirties, Peng was one of the most senior generals in the Jiangxi Soviet (1934–1935).

=== Defending the Jiangxi Soviet ===
Following his defeat by He Jian, Peng and the remnant of his forces joined the communist guerrillas at Jinggangshan. One of his first operations was to save Mao, who was attached to a unit that faced encirclement from Kuomintang forces. Jinggangshan was very poor and cold during the winter. It was ideal for retreat but not as a base for the growing communist forces. Zhu and Mao decided to attack into the adjacent area around Ruijin, Jiangxi, an agricultural city defended by weak warlord units. In January 1929, they successfully occupied the area, which became the Jiangxi Soviet.

Peng remained behind to guard Jinggangshan with a force of 800 soldiers but withdrew after an attack by a Hunanese Kuomintang force of 25,000 soldiers. He was criticized by Mao for retreating. Peng returned to the area with a force of 1,000 men later that year after the Kuomintang withdrew. He then successfully organized two large raids into southern Hunan, first during the summer of 1929 and later in the spring of 1930, increasing the amount of supplies and the number recruits for his force. Between those two raids, a compromise was reached within the broader communist forces at large. Professional military discipline and strategy should prevail over Mao's mobile guerilla tactics, while political indoctrination efforts by CCP commissars, such as Mao, would be strengthened.

In April 1930, Peng became the commander of a newly formed Red 3rd Army. In July 1930, Li Lisan, who had gained de facto leadership of the Chinese Communist Party, saw the worldwide economic depression as a window of opportunity and issued a general order for communist units around China to "conquer one provincial capital" as a signal of a nationwide uprising and "revolutionary storm". Mao and Zhu were skeptical, but Peng prepared for and launched attacks on the cities of Yuezhou and Changsha, the capital of Hunan province, with 17,000 soldiers and the support of another 10,000 guerillas. Changsha was defended by He Jian, Peng's former superior. Peng was initially victorious and occupied the city on July 30 following a hasty retreat by He. The anticipated nationwide revolution did not occur, however, and on August 5 He Jian counterattacked with a force of 35,000 men. Peng was forced to withdraw. On September 1, Peng attempted to capture Changsha again but suffered heavy casualties. Mao and Zhu had been reluctant to fully support Peng during his campaign. Nonetheless, Zhu was willing to explore other vectors of attack with Peng. Mao, however, believed that they should continue to consolidate their base areas instead. Under the influence of Li Lisan, some CCP members in Jiangxi rose up to oppose Mao's strategy, but the insurgency was suppressed in early 1931.

Peng scored a series of victories defending against the Kuomintang-aligned National Revolutionary Army (NRA) during the first three encirclement campaigns from December 1930 to May 1931. The outcome bolstered the positions of Zhu and Peng, who conducted conventional mobile operations in contrast with Mao's doctrine of guerilla warfare. After Li Lisan fell from power, "internationalists" who were more aligned with the Comintern rose to prominence within the Party. Following the return of several military leaders who had been training in Moscow, Jiangxi Soviet's forces were re-organized along more professional lines as Peng had long advocated for. On November 7, Peng was named to the Central Military Commission and to the Central Executive Committee of the Jiangxi Soviet, the first time that he had been named to a position of political leadership in the communist movement. In February 1932, Peng attacked but failed to dislodge elite NRA troops at Kanchow. Nonetheless, he continued to argue in favor of conventional operations over guerilla tactics during the August meeting of the Party's Military Commission, where he was named vice-chairman. During the fourth encirclement campaign involving 400,000 NRA soldiers, Peng successfully defeated an elite enemy division in Chiaohu and forayed into Fujian province, capturing a large amount of ammunition. In 1933, the Chinese Communist Party shifted its focus from underground activities in the cities to building up its power in rural bases.

=== Long March ===
In October 1933 Chiang Kai-shek took command of nearly 800,000 soldiers and led the fifth encirclement campaign against CCP forces, which numbered about 150,000 regulars and guerillas. The communist military leaders, including Peng and Zhu De, prepared largely static defenses, a strategy supported by the internationalists, the returned "students", and German advisor Otto Braun. Chiang was able to successfully encircle the soviet base areas and deal a number of defeats to the communists. Peng's own units shrank from 35,000 to around 20,000 men. CCP remnants decided to retreat from Jiangxi. On October 20, 1934, they broke out of NRA encirclement and began the Long March. Of the 18,000 men under Peng's command when the March began, only about 3,000 remained when Peng's forces reached their eventual destination in Shaanxi on October 20, 1935.

Due to their defeat in 1934, Peng began shifting toward the doctrine of guerilla warfare advocated by Mao. He supported Mao's rise to power during the January 1935 Zunyi Conference. During his time in Guizhou in April 1935, he established an anti-Nationalist alliance between the communists and anti-warlord forces commanded by Lu Ruiguang. Peng continued to consolidate the communists' base area after arriving in Shaanxi by campaigning in neighboring Shanxi and Gansu. In April 1937, Peng was named vice commander-in-chief of all Chinese communist forces, outranked only by Zhu De, who was named commander-in-chief. Peng's promotion was supported by Lin Biao, who had been actively supporting Peng for promotions to senior leadership as early as May 1934. In early 1935, Lin responded to widespread discontent within the Red Army over Mao's evasive tactics, which it perceived as unnecessarily exhausting, by publicly proposing for Peng to take overall command of the Red Army, but Mao, who had recently been promoted to the position, attacked Peng and Lin for challenging him and successfully retained his position.

In October 1935, following the last major battle between the Kuomintang and the Red Army, Mao wrote and dedicated a poem to Peng. (The poem was not published until 1947.)

The mountains are high, the road is long and full of potholes,
Many soldiers are moving to and fro,
Who is the courageous one, striking from his horse in all directions?
None other than our great General Peng!

山高路远坑深
大军纵横驰奔
谁敢横刀立马
唯我彭大将军

In 1936, the American journalist Edgar Snow stayed for several days at Peng's compound in Yuwang while Peng was campaigning in Ningxia. Snow had long conversations with him and wrote two whole chapters about Peng in his book Red Star Over China. He wrote more about Peng than any other individual, except for Mao.

== World War II ==
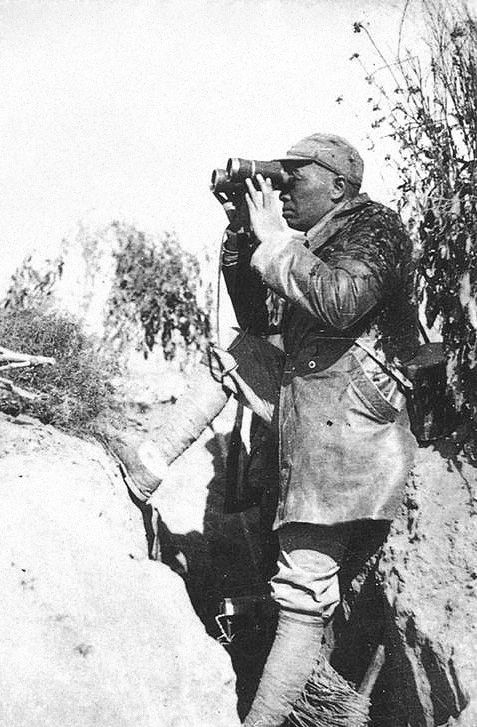
Peng Dehuai commanded the largest communist offensive in the war against Japan.

After the 1937 Marco Polo Bridge Incident, China and Japan went to war. When the Kuomintang and communists declared a united front to fight the Japanese, Peng was confirmed as a general in the unified command structure of the NRA. At the August 20, 1937 Luochuan Conference (洛川会议), Mao believed that the united front should be used as a feint by giving token resistance to the Japanese but saving the strength of the Red Army for the eventual confrontation with the Kuomintang. However, Peng, along with most other senior military and political leaders, disagreed and believed that the Red Army should genuinely focus on fighting the Japanese. Mao was not able to force his position, and the communists co-operated with the Kuomintang and fought the Japanese.

When the Japanese invaded Shanxi, the Red Army (renamed the Eighth Route Army) assisted the Kuomintang warlord, Yan Xishan, in resisting the Japanese, and Peng traveled to the provincial capital, Taiyuan, with Zhou Enlai to co-ordinate tactics. After the Japanese advanced towards Taiyuan on September 13, 1937, Peng directed overall operations from a base in Wutaishan but was called from duty to attend a Politburo meeting on December 13. At the meeting, Peng advocated a greater material commitment to the defense of Shanxi, but Mao disagreed and wanted the Red Army to reduce its commitment to fighting the Japanese. In 1938, after Mao's rival, Zhang Guotao, defected to the Kuomintang, Peng moved closer to Mao's position. In late 1938, Peng set up a base in Taihangshan, on the borders of Shanxi and Hebei, and directed guerrilla operations in both provinces. From Taihangshan, Peng commanded two thirds of the Eighth Route Army, approximately 100,000 soldiers.

In July 1940, Peng was given overall command of the largest communist operation of the anti-Japanese war, the Hundred Regiments Offensive, when 200,000 regular troops from the Eighth Route Army participated in the operation and were supported by 200,000 irregular communist guerrillas. From August 20 to October 5, 1940, communist forces destroyed large numbers of bridges, tunnels, and railroad tracks in Japanese-occupied China and inflicted relatively heavy Japanese casualties. From October 6 to December 5, the Japanese counterattacked, and the communists mostly repelled the counterattack successfully. Peng's operation was successful in disrupting Japanese communication lines and logistics networks, which were not fully restored until 1942, but the communists suffered heavy losses, In communist sources, the Japanese casualties have two figures, one of which is 20,645 and the other 12,645. Foreign sources give figures of 20,900. In early 1941, the Japanese began a large-scale effort to drive Peng from his base in Taihangshan, and Peng relocated closer to the communist base in Yan'an in late 1941.

After being recalled to Yan'an, Peng was subjected to a political indoctrination campaign in which he was criticized as an "empiricist" for his good relations with the Comintern and survived professionally only through an unconditional conversion to Mao's leadership. Mao ordered Peng to be criticized for 40 days for the "failings" of the Hundred Regiments Campaign (even though Mao had supported it and later praised its successes). Peng was not allowed to reply and was forced to make a self-criticism. Privately, Peng resented Mao's criticism of him, and in 1959 once told Mao: "At Yan'an, you fucked my mother for forty days."

From 1942 to 1945, Peng's role in the war was mostly political, and he supported Mao very closely. In June 1944, Peng was part of a team that held conferences with American military personnel who visited Yan'an as part of the Dixie Mission, briefing the Americans about the military situation in Japanese-occupied China.

== People's Liberation Army ==
=== Defeating the Kuomintang ===
The Japanese surrendered on September 2, 1945, ending China's war with Japan and beginning the final stage of the Chinese Civil War. In October Peng took command of troops in northern China, occupied Inner Mongolia, and accepted the surrender of Japanese soldiers there. In March 1946, communist forces (1.1 million soldiers) were renamed the "People's Liberation Army" (PLA). Peng himself was placed in command of 175,000 soldiers, organized as the "Northwest Field Army", most of which had been under the command of He Long during the war against Japan. He then became Peng's second-in-command. Peng's notable subordinates in the Northwest Field Army included Zhang Zongxun and Wang Zhen.

Peng's forces were the most poorly armed of the newly re-organized army but were responsible for the area around the communist capital, Yan'an. In March 1947, Kuomintang General Hu Zongnan, invaded the area with 260,000 soldiers. Hu's forces were among the best-trained and most well-supplied Nationalist units, but one of Zhou Enlai's spies was able to provide Peng with information about Hu's strategic plans, his forces' troop distributions, strength, and positions, and details about the air cover available to Hu. Peng was forced to abandon Yan'an in late March but resisted Hu's forces long enough for Mao and other senior party leaders to evacuate safely. Mao wanted Peng to provoke a decisive confrontation with Hu immediately, but Peng dissuaded him. By April, Mao agreed that Peng's objective was to "keep the enemy on the run... tire him out completely, reduce his food supplies, and then look for an opportunity to destroy him."

On May 4 Peng's forces attacked an isolated supply depot in northeastern Shaanxi, arrested its commander, and captured food reserves, 40,000 army uniforms, and a collection of arms that included over a million pieces of artillery. Peng's forces were pushed back to the border of Inner Mongolia but finally managed to decisively defeat Hu's forces in August, in the Battle of Shajiadian(沙家店战役), which saved Mao and other members from the Central Committee from being taken prisoner. Peng eventually pushed Kuomintang forces out of northern Shaanxi in April 1948.

Between 1947 and September 22, 1949, Peng's forces occupied Gansu, Ningxia, and Qinghai. His forces repeatedly defeated but could not destroy the forces of Hu Zongnan and Ma Bufang, which retreated into Sichuan and were airlifted to Taiwan when the Kuomintang lost the Civil War in December 1949. In October Peng's forces, led directly by Wang Zhen, invaded Xinjiang. Most of Xinjiang's defenders surrendered peacefully and were incorporated as a new unit in Peng's army, but some ethnic guerrilla bands resisted Chinese control for several years. After the People's Republic of China was declared on October 1, 1949, Peng was appointed Chairman of the Northwest China Military and Administrative Commission and Commander-in-Chief and Political Commissar of Xinjiang, with Wang Zhen as his deputy. That appointment gave Peng responsibility over Shaanxi, Gansu, Ningxia, Qinghai, and Xinjiang, an area of over 5 million square kilometres (1.9 million square miles) but under 30 million people. Peng's forces continued their gradual occupation of Xinjiang, which they completed in September 1951.

=== Korean War ===
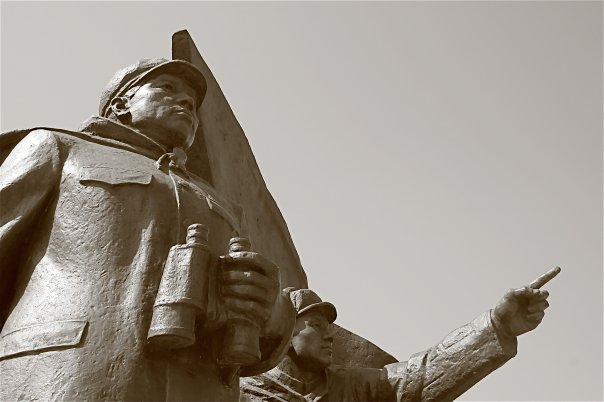
A statue of Peng now stands on the Chinese border with Korea, on the place that Peng crossed into North Korea in 1950.

North Korea invaded South Korea on June 25, 1950. After receiving its endorsement from the United Nations, the United States landed its first troops in Korea on September 15. On October 1, the first anniversary of the founding of the People's Republic, UN forces crossed the 38th parallel into North Korea. There was some disagreement within China's leadership about how to react to the American push to the Chinese border. Mao and Zhou wanted direct military intervention, but most other Chinese leaders believed that China should not enter the war unless it was directly attacked. Lin Biao was Mao's first choice to lead the Chinese People's Volunteer Army (PVA) into Korea, but Lin refused, citing his bad health.

Mao then sought the support of Peng, who had not yet taken a strong position, to lead the PVA. Peng flew to Beijing from Xi'an (where he was still administering northwest China and directing the incorporation of Xinjiang into the PRC), and arrived on October 4. Peng listened to both sides of the debate and on October 5 decided to support Mao. Peng's support for Mao's position changed the atmosphere of the meeting, and most other leaders changed their positions to support a direct Chinese intervention in the Korean War. On October 5, Peng was named the Commander and the Commissar of the People's Volunteer Army and held both titles until the Korean Armistice Agreement in 1953. Mao directed China's general strategy, and Zhou was appointed general commander and coordinating Peng's forces with the Soviet and North Korean governments and the rest of the Chinese government. Over the next week, Peng established a headquarters in Shenyang, and prepared his invasion strategy with his officers.

Peng stripped Kim Il-sung of his military command, condemning Kim's leadership as "extremely childish" and incompetent, effectively reducing Kim to a powerless figure in the war.

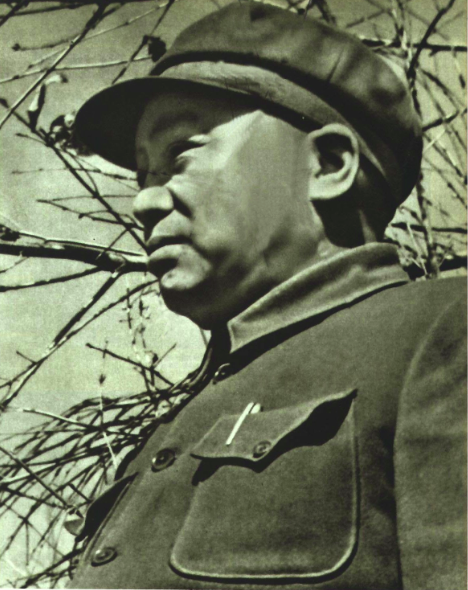
Peng at the frontline, during the Korean War (1951)

After Zhou and Lin had negotiated Stalin's approval, Peng attended a conference in Beijing with Mao, Zhou, and Gao Gang on October 18, and they ordered the first wave of Chinese soldiers, in total more than 260,000 men, to cross into Korea on the night of October 19. On October 25, the PVA had its first confrontation with UN troops at Onjong and Unsan, and pushed the UN forces south of the Chongchon River by November 4 in the aftermath of First Phase Campaign. From November 24 to December 24, Peng directed 380,000 PVA troops to confront UN forces in the Second Phase Campaign, and he successfully recovered the area north of the 38th parallel. However, on his watch, Mao's son Anying was killed in an air raid.

Despite his personal reservations, Peng then began an ambitious campaign to take the area south of the 38th parallel to fulfill Mao's political objectives for the war. About 230,000 Chinese soldiers crossed into South Korean territory on December 31 and captured Seoul as part of the Third Phase Campaign but were forced to evacuate it with heavy losses on March 14, 1951, as the UN forces counterattacked during the course of Fourth Phase Campaign. Peng launched a final Fifth Phase Campaign from April 22 to June 10 to retake Seoul with 548,000 Chinese troops, but it failed, and the Korean War came to a standstill just north the 38th parallel. In the evaluation of US Army's official Korean War historian Roy Edgar Appleman, Peng's performances in the war were unremarkable in terms of military talents despite his aggressiveness and leadership skills. During the Cultural Revolution, a period where Peng was heavily targeted, Red Guards claimed that his successful campaigns, from October to December 1950, were fought under Mao's direction but that his unsuccessful campaigns, from January to May 1951, were organized by Peng against Mao's instructions. Modern scholars reject that interpretation and credit Peng with both the successes and the failures of the war.

PVA casualties during the first 12 months of the Korean War, from October 1950 to October 1951, were heavy. Soviet material support was slight, and because the only available means to transport supplies into Korea for the first year of the war was a force of 700,000 labourers, all available supplies were light and limited. The UN forces also had complete air superiority. The logistic constraints later caused 45,000 Chinese soldiers to freeze to death between November 27 and December 12, 1950, because of inadequate winter clothing. China's insufficient artillery, armor, and air support meant that Peng was forced to rely heavily on human wave tactics until the summer of 1951. Stealthy fireteams attacked in column against weak points in enemy defenses in the hope that surprise, attrition, and perseverance would break the enemy lines. Participants even drank large quantities of Kaoliang wine to improve their courage. Some of the worst Chinese battle losses occurred during the Second and the Fifth Phase Campaign. Up to 40% of all Chinese forces in Korea were rendered combat ineffective between November 25 and December 24, 1950, and about 12 Chinese divisions were lost in from April 22 to June 10, 1951. All in all, over a million Chinese soldiers became casualties during the course of the war. Peng justified the PVA's high casualty rate by his almost religious belief in communism and the party and his belief that the ends of the conflict justified the means. Some accounts even claimed that Peng invented the human wave tactic under the name "short attack" to exploit his manpower advantage.

On November 19, 1951, Zhou called a conference in Shenyang to discuss improvements to China's logistical network, but they did little to resolve China's supply problems directly. Peng visited Beijing several times over the next several months to brief Mao and Zhou about the heavy casualties suffered by Chinese troops and the increasing difficulty of keeping the front lines supplied with basic necessities. By the winter of 1951–1952, Peng became convinced that the war would be protracted and that neither side would be able for achieve victory in the foreseeable future. On February 24, 1952, the Central Military Commission, presided over by Zhou, discussed the PVA's logistical problems with members of various government agencies involved in the war effort. After the government representatives emphasized their inability to meet the demands of the war, Peng, in an angry outburst, shouted, "You have this and that problem.... You should go to the front and see with your own eyes what food and clothing the soldiers have! Not to speak of the casualties! For what are they giving their lives? We have no aircraft. We have only a few guns. Transports are not protected. More and more soldiers are dying of starvation. Can't you overcome some of your difficulties?" The atmosphere became so tense that Zhou was forced to adjourn the conference. He later called a series of meetings, and it was agreed that the PVA would be divided into three groups to be dispatched to Korea in shifts, to accelerate the training of Chinese pilots, to provide more anti-aircraft guns to the front lines, to purchase more military equipment and ammunition from the Soviet Union, to provide the army with more food and clothing, and to transfer the responsibility of logistics to the central government. Peng also became a zealous supporter of the Three-anti Campaign because of his belief that corruption and waste were the main causes of the PVA's hardship.

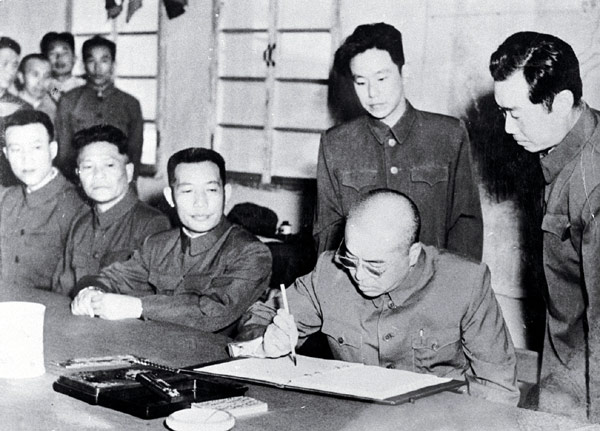
In 1953, Peng signed the armistice agreement which ended the Korean War.

Truce talks began on July 10, 1951, but proceeded slowly. Peng was recalled to China in April 1952 for a head tumor, and Chen Geng and Deng Hua later assumed Peng's responsibilities in the PVA.

On July 27, 1953, Peng personally signed the armistice agreement in Panmunjom. At a mass rally in Pyongyang on July 31, Kim Il Sung awarded Peng his second North Korean "National Flag" Order of Merit, First Class (the first had been awarded to Peng in 1951) and awarded Peng the title of "Hero of the Korean Democratic People's Republic." Peng also received a hero's welcome in Tiananmen Square on August 11. Chinese troops remained in North Korea until 1958.

The Korean War affected Peng's vision for the development of the PLA over the next decade. The heavy losses in the war's first year indicated unpreparedness for modern conventional warfare; the PLA needed modern professional standards, equipment, and tactics. Military training needed to take priority over political indoctrination, and commissars should be subordinate to military commanders. He regarded the Soviet Army — the only example of a modern communist force — as the model. Peng believed that the CCP's main role was to improve the welfare of the common people; this was contrary to Mao's political goals and contributed to their conflict in the late 1950s. Stalin once arbitrated in favor of Peng in a conflict with a Soviet diplomat by saying, "Trust him in everything; Peng is a long-tested, talented militarist."

== Defense Minister ==
After being recalled to China in April 1952, Peng succeeded Zhou in managing the day-to-day affairs of the Central Military Commission in July 1952. In the spring of 1954, Peng was confirmed as the vice-chairman of the commission (Mao was its chairman) and became effectively the most senior military leader in China. On September 24, 1954, the First National People's Congress confirmed Peng's position and appointed him Defense Minister and one of the ten vice-ministers of the State Council. Lin Biao was senior to Peng on the State Council. Soon after accepting those appointments, on October 1, 1954, Peng produced an ambitious plan for the modernization of the PLA on the model of the Soviet military.

=== Political activities ===
Peng had been an alternate member of the Central Committee since 1934, a full member since 1938, and a member of the Politburo since 1945, but it was not until he became the leader of the PLA and moved permanently to Beijing in November 1953 that he could attend regular political meetings and became active in domestic politics. Peng had been loyal to Mao's leadership since the 1935 Zunyi Conference and continued to support Mao for several years after he had moved to Beijing. Peng, like Lin Biao, was implicated in passively supporting Gao Gang's effort to replace Liu Shaoqi as the second most powerful person in China in 1953 but then opposed Gao in 1954 once Mao had made his own opposition clear. Mao did not take any action against Peng or Lin, but Peng's involvement alienated Peng from Liu and Liu's supporters.

In 1955, Peng supported Mao's efforts to collectivize agriculture. Along with Liu Shaoqi, Zhu De, Lin Biao, Lin Boqu, and Luo Ronghuan, Peng opposed Mao's attempt to liberalize China's culture and politics in the first stages of the 1957 Hundred Flowers Campaign but then supported Mao's efforts to arrest and persecute Chinese citizens who had criticized the CCP later that year.

During the late 1950s, Peng developed a personal dislike for Mao's efforts to promote his own image in Chinese popular culture as a perfect hero singularly responsible for the communist victories of his time. In 1955 to 1956, Peng was involved in a large number of efforts to moderate Mao's popular image by developing it into a personal campaign. Peng's preference for modesty and simplicity led Peng to oppose Mao's efforts to develop his personality cult. In 1955, a draft copy of a book, The Military History of the PVA, was submitted to Peng so that he could edit and authorize it. The preface of the book stated that "the military victories of the PVA" were won "under the correct leadership of the CCP and of Comrade Mao Zedong." Peng authorized the text after he had removed "and of Comrade Mao Zedong."

In 1956, an anonymous Chinese citizen wrote a letter to Peng to condemn the practices of hanging portraits of Mao in public places and singing songs in praise of Mao. Peng sent this letter to Huang Kecheng, his chief of staff, to be widely distributed. Peng successfully opposed efforts to place a bronze statue of Mao in the Beijing Military Museum by saying, "Why take the trouble to put it up? What is put up now will be removed in the future." When greeted by a group of soldiers who shouted, "Long Live Chairman Mao!" (literally "10,000 years for Chairman Mao"), Peng addressed the soldiers by saying, "You shout '10,000 years for Chairman Mao!' – does he, then, live for 10,000 years? He will not even live for 100 years! This is a personality cult!" When one of Peng's political commissars suggested that the Maoist hymn The East is Red should be widely taught throughout the PLA, Peng angrily rejected the suggestion, similarly by saying, "That is a personality cult! That is idealism!" Later in 1956, a group of soldiers visited Peng to request an audience with the chairman, but Peng rejected them by saying, "He is an old man, what is so beautiful about him?"

In preparation for the Eighth National Congress, held in September 1956, Peng attended a Politburo committee to redraft the new Party Constitution. At the meeting, Peng suggested for a section in the Constitution's preamble referring to Mao Zedong Thought to be removed. Liu Shaoqi, Deng Xiaoping, Peng Zhen, and most other senior CCP members present quickly agreed, and it was removed from the final version of the 1956 Party Constitution. At the Congress, Peng was reappointed to the Politburo and as a full member of the Central Committee.

Peng resented Mao's personal lifestyle, which Peng considered decadent and luxurious. By the late 1950s, Mao had developed a lifestyle that was out of touch with Peng's preference for modesty and simplicity. Mao enjoyed a private pool in Zhongnanhai and had many villas around China built for him, which he would travel to on a private train. Mao enjoyed the companionship of an ever-changing succession of enthusiastic young women, whom he met either at weekly dances in Zhongnanhai or on his journeys by train. Mao had a costly office suite built for him in Beijing, including a private, book-lined study (which, according to Mao's personal physician Li Zhisui, was never used). When Peng's wife suggested for the couple to spend more free time visiting Mao's quarters, Peng was reluctant and stated that Mao's surroundings were "too luxuriously furnished" for him to tolerate. Throughout the 1950s, Peng continued to refer to the Chairman as "Old Mao", an egalitarian title that was used among senior CCP leaders in the 1930s and 1940s.

=== Military activities ===
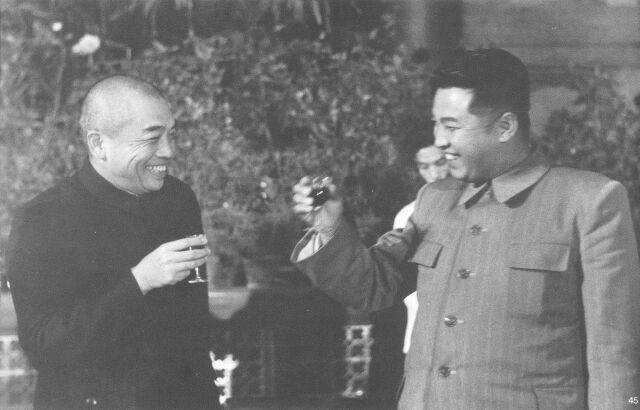
Following the Korean War, Peng rose in prominence and is here seen welcoming Kim Il Sung to Beijing in 1955.

Peng staged his first offensive after becoming Defense Minister in January 1955 by attacking and occupying a chain of islands, part of Zhejiang, which were still held by the Kuomintang from which it occasionally staged guerrilla raids as far as Shanghai. That operation led the United States to form a defense agreement with Taiwan, which effectively prevented the communists from completely defeating the Kuomintang.

Peng participated in a number of foreign trips throughout the communist world after he had become Defense Minister, the first time that he had traveled outside of China and North Korea. In May 1955 Peng visited East Germany, Poland, and the Soviet Union and met with Wilhelm Pieck, Józef Cyrankiewicz, Nikita Khrushchev and Soviet Marshals Konstantin Rokossovsky and Georgy Zhukov. In September 1955, Peng traveled to Poland and the Soviet Union to attend the signing of the Warsaw Pact as an observer. From November 2 to December 3, 1957, Peng accompanied Mao on his second visit to the Soviet Union. From April 24 to June 13, 1959, Peng went on a "military goodwill tour" across the communist world and visited Poland, East Germany, Czechoslovakia, Hungary, Romania, Bulgaria, Albania, the Soviet Union, and Mongolia.

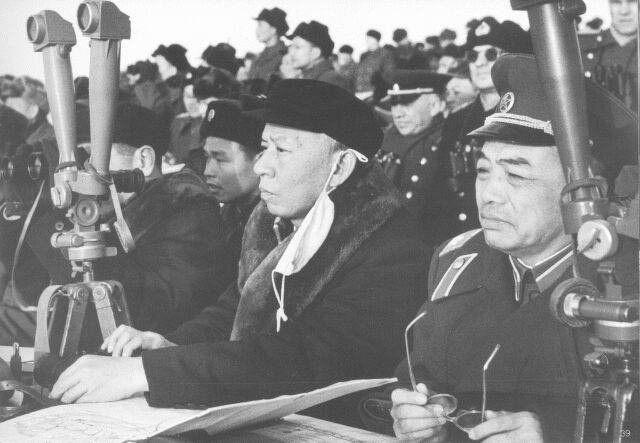
Peng (right) and President of China Liu Shaoqi observing military exercises at the Liaodong Peninsula (1955)

After Peng had returned from his first tour abroad in September 1955, he began to implement his "Four Great Systems" seriously: the implementation of standardized military ranks, salaries, awards, and rules of conscription. On September 23, 1955, the State Council named Peng one of the ten marshals of the PLA, China's highest military rank. (Before 1955, Chinese soldiers were assigned "functions" instead of ranks, such as "company commander", or "division commander".) PLA leaders were promoted into Peng's new system of military ranks and were awarded new orders of merit. Peng himself was awarded the First Class Medal of the Order of August 1 (for his achievements in the Chinese Civil War from 1927 to 1937), the First Class Medal of the Order of Independence and Freedom (for his achievements in the Sino-Japanese War), and the First Class Medal of the Order of Liberation (for his achievements in the Chinese Civil War from 1945 to 1949). Peng introduced military insignia for the first time and issued military uniforms modeled on those worn by Soviet soldiers. On January 1, 1956, Peng replaced conscription with voluntary service and standardized career soldiers' salaries on eighteen grades from private second class to marshal. In May 1956, Peng introduced a clear prioritization of rank favoring commanders over political commissars. By September 1956, Peng's doctrines of professionalism, strict training, discipline, and the mastery of modern equipment were entrenched within the structure of the PLA.

Mao opposed all of those initiatives but at first focused his dissatisfaction on other marshals, Liu Bocheng and Luo Ronghuan, whom Mao accused of "dogmatism" (uncritically assimilating methods borrowed from the Soviet Union). In 1958, Mao convinced Peng of the need to maintain a balance between military professionalism and political indoctrination, and Peng co-operated in removing Liu and Luo from high positions. Peng's removal of Liu especially cost Peng the support of many other military leaders, and Mao used Liu's resulting criticism of Peng to criticize Peng before other senior Chinese leaders the next year, when Mao then sought to remove Peng.

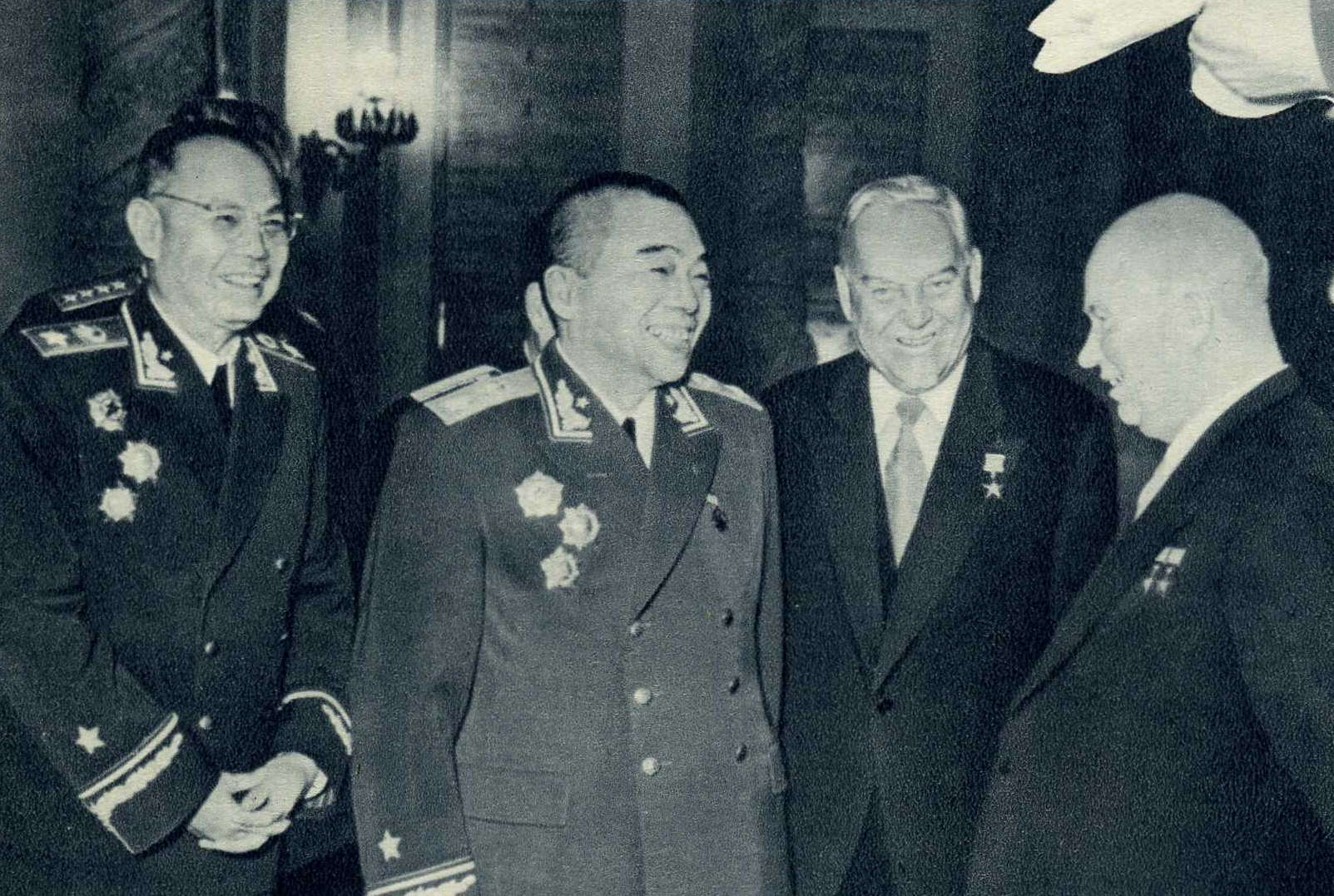
Peng (second from left) and Marshal Ye Jianying with Nikolai Bulganin (second from right) and Nikita Khrushchev (1958)

Peng was still in command of the PLA when Mao ordered the shelling of Kinmen (Quemoy) and Matsu, islands off the coast of Fujian that were still held by the Kuomintang, in the late summer and autumn of 1958. Peng developed a strategy with his chief of staff, Su Yu, to bombard the islands so intensely that the morale of their defenders would collapse, which would eventually lead to the islands' surrender. Then, the PLA would then use the islands to launch attacks against Taiwan. The saturated shelling of the islands included over half the artillery in China and began on August 28. The attack included a co-ordinated effort to cut off the islands' air and sea supply lines.

The campaign ran into unexpected difficulties and did not achieve its objectives. The Soviets did not give explicit support to the operation, and the United States provided air and sea cover to Kuomintang supply ships up to within three miles of the Chinese coast. Kuomintang fighter jets shot down 37 PRC fighters but only lost only 3 themselves, and Nationalist artillery and naval bombardments destroyed 25 PRC ships. Peng had quietly opposed the operation from the beginning and gradually began to end hostilities after the PLA had encountered serious difficulties by announcing a series of intermittent ceasefires and eventually halting the campaign in late October. Su Yu was blamed for the disaster and replaced with another ally of Peng, General Huang Kecheng. Peng's position was not directly affected, but his personal prestige suffered, and the practical effects of his efforts to modernize China's armed forces were called into question within the PLA. Su was accused of directing the aborted attack on Matzu and withdrawing troops from North Korea without authorization, and of secretly taking orders from the Soviets. The conflict between Su and Peng lingered throughout Peng's life, and Su was not rehabilitated until after his death.

== Fall from power ==
=== The Great Leap Forward ===
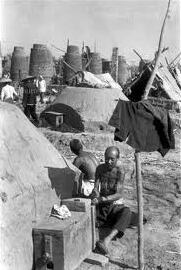
During the Great Leap Forward, many farmers were forced to work in primitive backyard furnaces in order to produce poor-quality steel.

In the autumn of 1957, Mao suggested a nationwide programme of mass collectivization, in which China's farmers would be forcibly relocated to large agricultural communes and all private property would be eliminated. Mao's theories on mass collectivization became the basis of the Great Leap Forward, a national economic plan that began in 1958 which caused a man-made famine across the country that lasted for several years. By 1959, tens of millions of people had starved to death. From October–December 1958, the economic system in the countryside broke down as farmers refused to go to work in the fields, raided government granaries for food, and in Guangdong, Hubei, Hunan, Jiangxi, Sichuan, and Qinghai, rebelled. In December 1958 China's leaders quietly decided to reverse the policies of the Great Leap.

Peng did not oppose Mao's collectivization drive in the first phase of the Great Leap, from late 1957 to early 1958, but he increasingly opposed it from spring to winter 1958, as the problems which Mao's policies had caused became more evident. In February 1958, Peng gave a speech for the fortieth anniversary of the Soviet Red Army, in which he suggested increased military cooperation between China and the Soviet Union. Mao opposed this suggestion, and began grooming Lin Biao as a viable successor to Peng for the position of Defense Minister. As part of the Great Leap Forward, Mao ordered the formation of a national militia that was controlled by Party members and independent of the PLA, eventually training and arming tens of millions of civilians.

Peng made regular inspection tours of the Chinese provinces after becoming Defense Minister in 1953. In a tour on Guangzhou in April 1958, he openly criticized Mao, saying "The Chairman talks all the time about more, faster, better, and more economical results. That is annoying. What does he want with chanting these liturgies all the time?" On an inspection tour through Gansu in October 1958, Peng observed many of the problems associated with the Great Leap Forward. Mature crops were left to die in the field because all of the young men had been drafted to operate primitive backyard furnaces. When Peng asked an old peasant why no one was collecting the harvest, he received the answer: "unless the centre sends down a great comrade, one cannot stand up against this storm." On the same tour Peng heard complaints that household utensils were being melted down for "steel", and that houses and orchards were cut and torn down in order to provide fuel for the backyard furnaces. In a subsequent tour through his native province of Hunan, later in 1958, Peng observed the same problems associated everywhere with the Great Leap Forward: serious food shortages; hungry children and babies; elders who expressed bitterness and anger; and arrogant, boasting Party cadres who administered local economic reforms. During his inspection tours through China in the fall of 1958, Peng composed a poem that summarized his attitude towards the Great Leap Forward:

Grain scattered on the ground, potato leaves withered;
Strong young people have left to make steel;
Only children and old women reap the crops;
How can they pass the coming year?
Allow me to raise my voice for the people!

谷撒地，薯叶枯
青壮炼铁去
收禾童与姑
来年日子怎么过
请为人民鼓咙胡

At an enlarged Politburo meeting in Shanghai, held from March 25 – April 1, Peng openly criticized Mao in the chairman's presence for the first time, accusing him of "taking personal command" of national politics and disregarding the collective leadership of the Chinese government and the Party. Mao responded with vague criticisms of Peng, which Peng said was "provocative". From April 24 – June 15 Peng left on a goodwill military tour through Eastern Europe. Peng met with Khrushchev on May 24, and was criticized during the Cultural Revolution for having criticized Mao's leadership to the Soviet leader, but the evidence that Peng criticized Mao to Khrushchev is very circumstantial, and Mao did not mention this during his efforts to have Peng purged. Peng's absence from China during the seven weeks that he was abroad allowed Mao to freely spread negative rumors discrediting Peng within the Party, and to develop consensus among other senior Party leaders to oppose Peng when he returned.

=== The Lushan Conference ===
The Eighth Plenum of the Eighth CCP Central Committee was held in the scenic resort town of Mount Lu, Jiujiang, on July 2, 1959, to discuss Party members' positions on the Great Leap Forward. Mao opened the conference by encouraging Party members to "criticize and offer opinions" on the government's "mistakes and shortcomings", and he promised that he would not attack any member personally as a "rightist" or "counter-revolutionary" for any opinions expressed at the conference. Peng had returned to China just previous to the conference after spending seven weeks abroad and was not planning on attending the conference, but Mao personally phoned Peng and invited him to attend. Peng obeyed Mao and travelled to Mount Lu to participate in the conference.

Peng participated in group meetings in the early portion of the conference, gaining consensus among his peers for criticizing the widespread practice of inaccurately reporting agricultural statistics, and emphasizing that "everybody had a share of responsibility, including Comrade Mao Zedong". Peng bluntly criticized the hesitation of senior Party members to disagree with the Party leadership, implying that many Party leaders were cowardly for following orders that they knew were not in the best interests of the Chinese people. After gaining the consensus of several of his peers, Peng developed his opinions more systematically, but was hesitant to bring up the full range of his criticisms in public. Peng discussed his thoughts with several other senior Party leaders (notably the CCP Secretary of Hunan, Zhou Xiaozhou (周小舟), and Peng's colleagues encouraged Peng to visit Mao privately in order to win Mao's support for a reversal of the policies of the Great Leap Forward. Peng visited Mao's quarters on the night of July 13, but found Mao asleep, and wrote Mao a "letter of opinion" articulating Peng's ideas instead. Peng delivered the letter to Mao on the morning of July 14, but Mao did not read the letter until July 17. Later on July 17 Mao had Peng's letter widely circulated among the other delegates at the conference. Peng did not intend his letter to be widely read and attempted to prevent its circulation, but was not successful. Most other senior leaders, including Liu Shaoqi, Zhou Enlai, and Deng Xiaoping, supported Peng's position before Mao began to attack it, indicating that they shared Peng's views and that they did not see Peng's letter as an attack on the chairman.

In Peng's letter, Peng compared himself to the courageous but tactless Han dynasty general Zhang Fei. Because of Mao's appreciation of Zhang's enemy, Cao Cao, Mao interpreted this as implying a confrontational relationship. Peng criticized the poor allocation of labour across China, especially the inefficient, country-wide practice of forcing farmers to work in backyard furnaces. He criticized the nationwide famine and severe shortage of cotton, and stated that the Chinese people were justified in demanding change from the present conditions. Peng blamed the problems of the Great Leap on what he called "problems in our way of thinking and style of work", especially the tendency for Party administrators to submit exaggerated production reports, and for Party bureaucrats to accept these figures uncritically. Peng blamed the mistakes of the Party on a culture of "petty bourgeois fanaticism", a tendency to believe in achieving change through blindly encouraging mass movements, and claimed that the acceptance of this culture had led to the Party leadership forgetting "the mass-line and the style of seeking truth from facts", which Peng believed had led to the Communist victories over the Japanese and Kuomintang. Peng criticized Mao's policy of "putting politics in command", substituting economic principles and productive work for political objectives.

Mao's decision to have Peng's letter widely circulated completely changed the direction of the conference. On July 21, Zhang Wentian gave an independent, supplementary speech attacking Mao's policies, and the same day a majority of delegates expressed their approval of Peng's letter, making it an official conference document. Mao interpreted the letter as a personal attack, and began to defend himself on July 23, attacking Peng and those who disagreed with his policies. Mao defended his commune system by claiming that "until now, not a single commune has collapsed". He attacked Peng and those who shared his political opinions as "imperialists" "bourgeoisie", and "rightists", and associated their positions with other Communist leaders who had led failed oppositions to Mao's leadership, including Li Lisan, Wang Ming, Gao Gang, and Rao Shushi. Mao brought up an ultimatum, stating that, if the delegates of the conference sided with Peng, Mao would split the CCP, retreating into the countryside and leading the peasants to "overthrow the government". The other senior leaders of the CCP, including Zhou Enlai and Liu Shaoqi, were unwilling to risk splitting the Party, and sided with Mao in opposing Peng's position.

From August 2, the conference debated whether Peng should be disciplined, what punishment Peng should receive, and for what reasons. Peng had to give a pointless speech of self-abasement in which he denounced his letter to Mao as a "series of absurdities" and confessed to damaging Mao's "lofty prestige from motives of exceedingly wrong personal prejudice".

On August 16, the conference passed two resolutions. The first resolution condemned Peng as the leader of an "right-opportunist anti-Party clique", of making "vicious attacks" on Mao, of having focused on "transient and partial shortcomings" in order to "paint a pitch-black picture of the present situation", of having formed an "anti-Party alliance" with Gao Gang in 1954 and of engaging in "long-standing anti-Party activities". He and his clique were also deemed "representatives of the bourgeoisie". The resolution did not eject Peng from the CCP, and it allowed Peng to retain his position in the Politburo, but he was excluded from Politburo meetings for years. The second resolution recognized Mao's dominance within the Party and subtly called for an end to the policies of the Great Leap Forward. After Mao had rallied the rest of the Party against him, Peng's options were limited to stubbornly standing his ground, engaging in a humiliating self-criticism, or suicide. After private discussion with other senior leaders, Peng considered the prestige of Mao and the unity of the Party and agreed to make a self-criticism, which was publicly reviewed at the conference, in which he admitted that he had made "severe mistakes" associated with his "rightist viewpoint", that he had been a follower of Li Lisan and Wang Ming, and in which he openly implicated his supporters in his "mistakes". After the conference, Peng said privately to Zhou Enlai regarding his self-criticism: "For the first time in my life, I have spoken out against my very heart!" Mao purged most of Peng's supporters from important offices following the conference, almost completely isolating Peng politically for the rest of his life. Peng later reflected that he was confused that Mao could have interpreted his private letter as a political attack, and wondered why, after thirty years of working together, Mao could not have discussed the matter privately with him, if Peng had indeed made the mistakes Mao claimed he did.

== Later life ==
In September 1959, Mao replaced Peng as Defense Minister with Lin Biao, which effectively ended Peng's military career. Peng was relocated to a suburb of Beijing and forfeited his marshal's uniform and military decorations. Lin reversed Peng's reforms, abolished all signs and privileges of rank, purged officers considered sympathetic to the Soviets, directed soldiers to part-time work as industrial and agricultural laborers, and indoctrinated the armed forces in Mao Zedong Thought. Lin's system of indoctrination made it clear that the party was clearly in command of China's armed forces, and Lin ensured that the army's political commissars enjoyed great power and status to see that his directives were followed. Lin implemented those reforms to please Mao but privately feared that they would weaken the PLA. Lin used his position as Minister of Defense to flatter Mao by using the army to promote Mao's personality cult throughout China by devising and running a number of national Maoist propaganda campaigns based on the PLA. The most successful of Lin's efforts to promote Mao's personality cult was the "learn from Lei Feng" campaign, which Lin began in 1963.

=== Partial rehabilitation ===
After his forced retirement, Peng lived alone, under constant surveillance from the Central Guard Division of the PLA and was accompanied by a secretary and a bodyguard. His wife remained in Beijing, and her work as the party secretary of Beijing Normal University allowed her to visit only infrequently. Peng's guards prevented curious local farmers from visiting Peng until he threatened to complain to Mao. Peng's niece, Peng Meikui, visited frequently, and they became close. Peng spent most of his free time in renovating his home, gardening, and studying Marxist theory, agriculture, and economics. Peng was not completely purged since even though he could no longer participate in government meetings or decision-making bodies, he still received and read all documents distributed to the members of the Politburo and State Council of which he was technically still a member. In 1960, Peng attended the funeral of Lin Boqu.

From 1960 to 1961, the effects of Mao's economic policies continued to produce widespread economic collapse. That improved Peng's reputation among party leaders who secretly believed that Mao's policies were a mistake and desired to reverse them. Deng Xiaoping and Liu Shaoqi led Party efforts to revive the Chinese economy and cultivated Peng's friendship as part of a wider effort to gain widespread support for their activities. In November to December 1961, Peng received permission to leave his residence for the first time since 1959 to conduct an inspection tour of Hunan. Peng found the conditions there even worse than in 1959 and, in a January 1962 conference of 7,000 party leaders to determine party economic policies, repeated most of the criticisms that he had made at Lushan. On June 16, 1962, Peng submitted a document, his "Letter of 80,000 Words", to Mao and the Politburo, which gave a full account of his life, admitted to several "mistakes", defended himself against most of the accusations made against him at the Lushan Conference, requested to be readmitted to decision-making government bodies, and sharply criticized the economic policies of the Great Leap Forward. In his letter, Peng first wrote one of his most famous quotes: "I want to be a Hai Rui!" The efforts of Liu and Deng to rehabilitate Peng further were not initially successful. Peng was not allowed to attend the Tenth Plenum of the Eighth CCP Central Committee, held in September 1962, and the efforts to reverse the verdict on Peng made at the Lushan Conference failed. From 1962 to 1965, Peng continued to live in relative obscurity but was no longer under house arrest.

After Mao had purged Peng in 1959, he appointed Marshal He Long to the head of an office to investigate Peng's past to find more reasons to criticize Peng. He accepted the position but was sympathetic to Peng, and he stalled for over a year before he submitted his report. Mao's prestige weakened when it became widely known that the Great Leap Forward had been a disaster, and He eventually presented a positive report that attempted to vindicate Peng.

In September 1965, Mao agreed to rehabilitate Peng by promoting him to a position managing the industrial development of Southwestern China, a project known as the Third Front. Peng initially refused the position and so Mao called him personally and convinced him to accept it by suggesting that the condemnation of Peng at the Lushan Conference may have been a mistake. Peng was then appointed "Deputy Commander of the Great Third Line of Construction in Southwest China" and "Third Secretary of the Control Commission of the CPC's Southwest Bureau." In practice, Peng's responsibilities were to oversee the industrial development of Sichuan, Guizhou, Yunnan, and Tibet with a focus on developing military industries and logistical networks. Those positions were far below Peng's position before 1959 but signaled his return to national politics.

Peng worked energetically until August 1966, when the beginning of the Cultural Revolution had him recalled to Chengdu, and the first Red Guards began patrolling the streets and violently attacking their perceived enemies. Peng's bodyguards warned him to avoid contact with the Red Guards, but Peng disregarded their advice: "a CPC member does not have to be afraid of the masses." Peng's disregard for personal danger and his confidence in the party made him one of the Cultural Revolution's first victims.

=== Persecution during Cultural Revolution and death ===
Peng Dehuai (1966) was brought to Beijing in chains by Red Guards, where he would be tortured and publicly humiliated for years.

Peng was one of the first public figures singled out for persecution in 1966 by the Cultural Revolution Group. The Secretariat of the Party, attempted to shield Peng, but Mao's wife, Jiang Qing, took a personal interest in persecuting Peng and directed Red Guards in Sichuan to find Peng in Chengdu, arrest him, and deliver him to Beijing to be persecuted. Local Red Guards in Chengdu were not enthusiastic to follow the orders. They visited Peng's house on December 22, 1966, and attempted to intimidate him by informing him of the recent arrests of some of his friends and comrades and the imminent arrests of Liu Shaoqi and Deng Xiaoping. Because of local Red Guards' lack of enthusiasm to carry out Jiang Qing's orders, a more radical Red Guard leader, Wang Dabin, arrived in Chengdu on December 24 and denounced his local comrades as "rightists" and "traitors" for delaying Peng's arrest. The Red Guards then abducted Peng in the early morning of December 25, put him in chains, and ransacked his house. Peng's bodyguards arrived to save Peng at around 4:00 a.m. but were already too late.

Premier Zhou Enlai made an effort to save Peng by placing him under PLA surveillance. On December 25, Zhou's office ordered the Red Guards who had abducted Peng to accompany members of the PLA from Chengdu, deliver Peng to Beijing by train (instead of by plane since the airports in Sichuan had been taken over by Red Guards), and deliver Peng to the Beijing PLA garrison. After the party arrived in Beijing, Wang Dabin successfully directed Red Guards under his command to delay the PLA unit scheduled to take possession of Peng and succeeded in keeping Peng from being saved.

In January 1967, Peng was taken to his first "struggle session" in which he was paraded in chains before several thousand jeering Red Guards through the city in an open truck, wearing a large paper dunce cap and with a wooden board hung from his neck on which his "crimes" were written. At Tiananmen Square, he and Zhang Wentian were surrounded by Red Guards, shackeled into a jetplane position, beaten and cursed at. In the fall, Peng was held at a PLA military prison outside Beijing and was allowed to receive extra clothing. In July, Mao and Lin Biao, co-operating with Jiang Qing's faction, ordered the PLA to form an "investigation group" to determine Peng's "crimes" so that Peng could be more thoroughly humiliated in future struggle sessions. Peng's jailers attempted to force Peng to confess that he was a "great warlord", a "great ambitionist", and a "great conspirator" who had "crept into the Party and the Army." Peng refused to confess to those accusations or to "surrender to the masses" and so his jailers strapped Peng to the floor of an unlit cell and did not allow him to stand or sit up, drink water, rise to go to the toilet, or move in his sleep for several days. After Peng still refused to "confess", his jailers began routinely beating him and broke several ribs, injured his back, and damaged his internal organs, especially his lungs. Peng's violent "interrogations" lasted over ten hours a day, but his interrogators were replaced every two hours to keep them from developing any sympathy for Peng, a practice pioneered by the Stalinist secret police in the 1930s. Peng was "interrogated" that way over 130 times. During interrogations he shouted denials to the Red Guards who beat him, and it is reputed that he pounded the table so hard that the cell walls shook.

In late July 1967, following the failed Wuhan Uprising, party leaders decided that Peng should be used as an example by publicly humiliating him by name at a national level. On July 31, an article appeared that was distributed nationally and directed the nation to take part in vilifying him. In the article, Peng was called a "capitalist", a "great ambitionist", and a "great conspirator" who had "always opposed Chairman Mao" and who was "the representative of the greatest capitalist-roader [Liu Shaoqi] in the army." The article accused Peng of conspiring with foreign countries; allying with "imperialists, revisionists, and counter-revolutionaries;" and waging "a wild attack against the Party". The campaign of national vilification against Peng lasted several months until late 1967. On August 16, another article stated that Peng "was never a Marxist" but that he had instead been a "capitalist great warlord" who had "crept into the Party and into the army... we have to struggle against him until he falls, until he breaks down, until he stinks." CCP propagandists made an effort to discredit Peng's military career by portraying it as a long string of failures except for the battles that were supposedly directed closely by Mao and to convince the Chinese people that Peng was a subhuman villain who should be destroyed without compassion or mercy.

In August 1967, Peng was taken to a "struggle meeting", which was held in a stadium attended by 40,000 PLA soldiers. At the meeting, Peng was led in chains to a stage, where he was forced to kneel for several hours while he listened to soldiers repeatedly denouncing him for his "crimes". At the end of the meeting, Lin Biao personally appeared to the soldiers, where he addressed the assembled soldiers and Peng, who was still kneeling. Lin gave a speech in which he denounced Peng as a villainous element who must be purged and that it was "in the interest of the whole Party, the whole army, and the whole people of the whole country" to persecute him so severely. Lin then addressed Peng directly: "If you reform yourself, all right, if not, it is all right too. But of course we hope you reform yourself." It is not known whether Peng eventually broke down and "confessed" at the rally.

Peng was imprisoned for the rest of his life. In 1969, the party formed a "special investigation group" to reach a verdict in his case. Peng's jailers then forced him to write a full biography of his life many times, but they did not believe that he ever fully confessed his "crimes". Peng was then subjected to constant violent "interrogations" throughout most of 1970 until a special military tribune sentenced Peng to life imprisonment. The sentence was immediately approved by Lin Biao's General Chief of Staff, Huang Yongsheng.

After the 1971 Lin Biao incident, the military attempted to improve Peng's living conditions, but the years of deprivation and torture from 1967 to 1970 had seriously weakened his physical health, and from late 1972 to his death, Peng was seriously ill probably from tuberculosis, thrombosis, or both. Peng was briefly hospitalized in 1973 before he was returned to prison, the first time that he had been outside of prison since 1967. Peng's niece, Peng Meikui, visited Peng in the hospital and convinced his jailers to allow an operation, but the nature and the results of this operation are unknown. Peng's medical condition deteriorated further in 1974. According to Jurgen Domes, there is "some scattered evidence" that he received no substantial medical aid because of Mao's direct order. On the other hand, David Shambaugh states that he was instead denied medical aid by the directive of Mao's wife, Jiang Qing. Peng died at 3:35 p.m. on November 29, 1974. His last wish was to see Zhu De on his deathbed. The request was denied and when Zhu De learnt of Peng's wish, after his death, he reportedly burst into tears.

Peng Meikui was allowed to view her uncle's body for twenty minutes but was then removed. Peng's body was quickly cremated, and his ashes were sent to Chengdu, identified only by a note that read, "No. 327 – Wang Chuan, from Chengdu".

== Posthumous rehabilitation ==
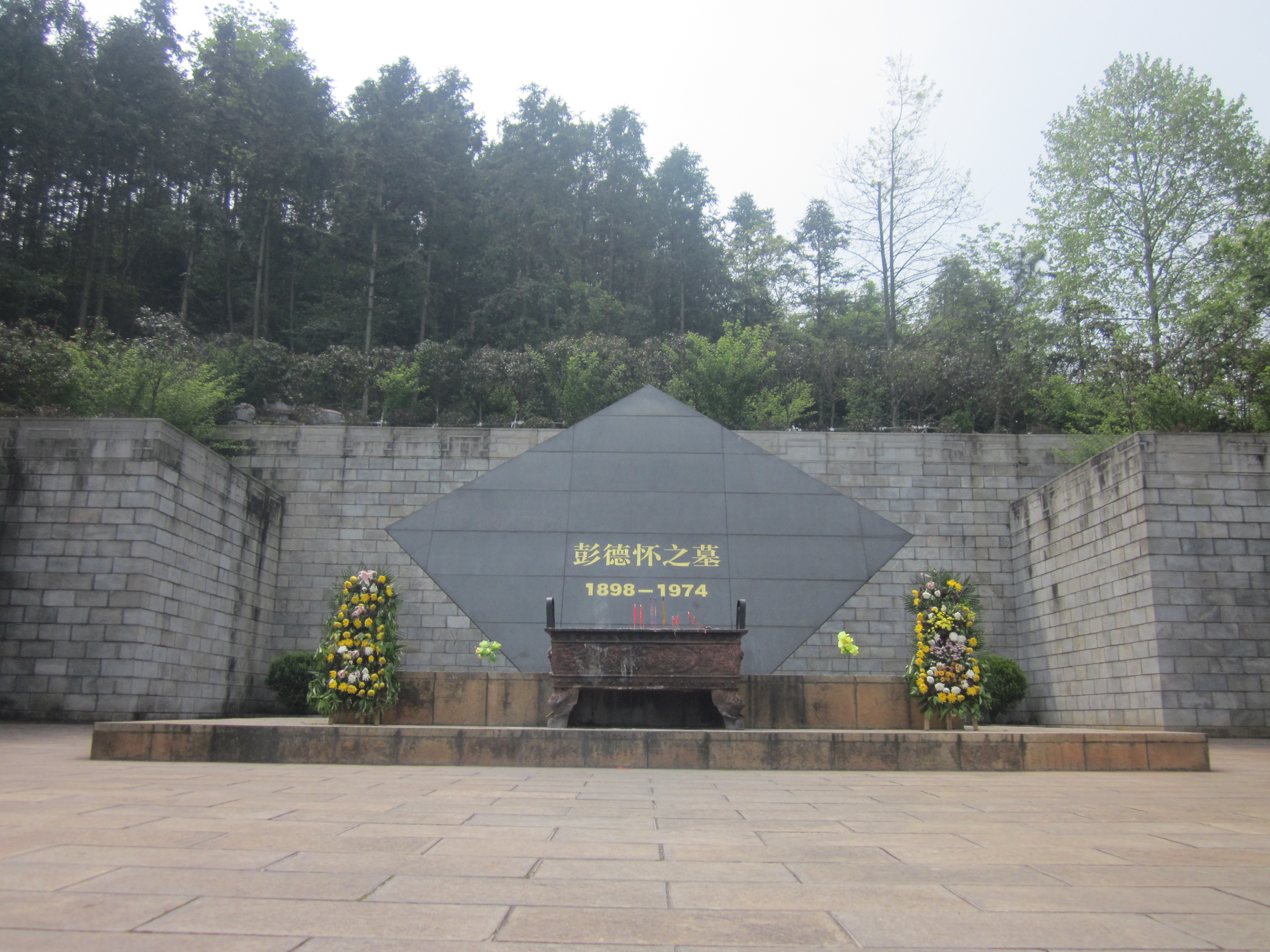
Tomb of Peng Dehuai

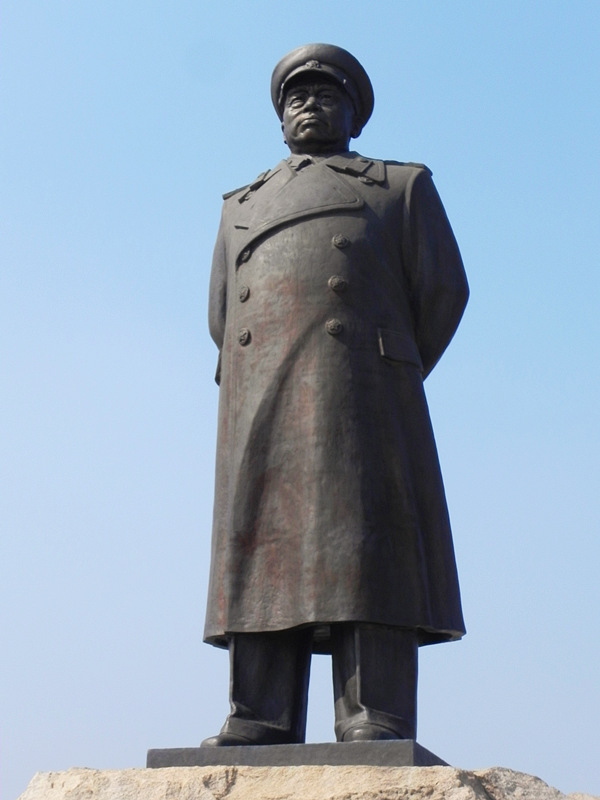
Statue of Peng at his hometown in Hunan

The leadership of the CCP successfully concealed Peng's death for several years and successfully convinced the only civilian witness, Peng Meikui, not to tell anyone of Peng's death. Peng's former bodyguards did not learn of his death until 1976. His wife, Pu Anxiu, had also been arrested by Red Guards and "sentenced" to a "labour reform camp", where she remained until 1975, when she was released to settle as a farmer in Northern China. She did not find out about Peng's death until she was allowed to return to Beijing in 1978, when the news was first publicly disclosed.

Mao died in 1976. Following a brief power struggle, Peng's former ally, Deng Xiaoping, emerged as the paramount leader of China. One of Deng's first political goals was to rehabilitate party members who had been condemned and persecuted during the Cultural Revolution. By 1978, many people, led by General Huang Kecheng, who had been a comrade of Peng's since Peng rebelled against the Kuomintang in 1928, were agitating for Peng's posthumous rehabilitation. The Chinese government formally reversed the "erroneous" verdict of Peng during the 3rd plenary session of the 11th Central Committee of the Chinese Communist Party, held from December 18 to 22, 1978. Deng gave a speech announcing Peng's rehabilitation:

He was courageous in battle, open and straightforward, incorruptible and impeccable, and strict towards himself. He cared about the masses, and was never concerned about his own advantage. He was never afraid of difficulties, neither of carrying heavy loads. In his revolutionary work, he was diligent, honest, and he had an utmost sense of responsibility.

Deng's speech also stated that Mao's decision in 1959, which vilified Peng as the leader of an "anti-Party clique", had been "entirely wrong" and that it had "undermined intra-Party democracy." From January 1979, the party encouraged historians and those who had known Peng to produce many memoirs, historical stories, and articles praising and remembering him. In 1980, the Intermediate Court of Justice in Wuhan sentenced Wang Dabin, the Red Guard who had directed Peng's arrest in 1966, to nine years in prison for "the persecution and torture of Comrade Peng Dehuai."

Following the conclusion of memorial services, Peng's ashes were interred at Babaoshan Revolutionary Cemetery. In December 1999, Peng's nephew and niece moved his ashes out of Babaoshan and buried them at his hometown of Wushi in Hunan.

In 1984, an "autobiography", Memoirs of a Chinese Marshal, was compiled from various documents that Peng had written about his life. Much of the material for Memoirs was drawn from the "confessions" that Peng had written during the Cultural Revolution, and the book focused on Peng's early life, before the Sino-Japanese War. In 1988, China released a set of stamps to commemorate the 90th anniversary of Peng's birth. In modern China, Peng is considered one of the greatest military leaders of the twentieth century.

== See also ==
- Chinese Red Army and People's Liberation Army – Chinese Civil War
- Eighth Route Army Second Sino-Japanese War
- Outline of the military history of the People's Republic of China
- People's Volunteer Army – Korean War
- List of generals of the People's Republic of China
- Lushan Conference – History of the People's Republic of China (1949–1976)
- Yuanshuai
- Long March
- Zhu De

== Notes ==
Government offices
New title	Minister of National Defense; 1954–1959	Next: Marshal Lin Biao
