= Zuo Quan =

Chinese Army general (1905–1942)

- 左权
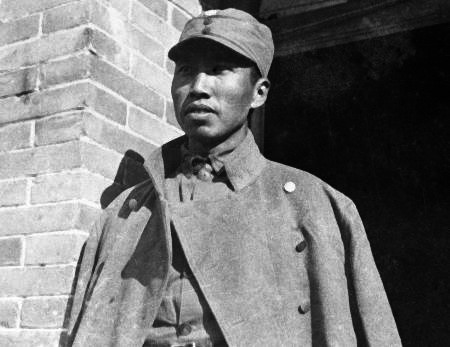
- Zuo Quan
- Born: March 1, 1905; Liling, Hunan
- Died: June 2, 1942 (aged 37); Liaoxian County, Shanxi
- Military career
- Allegiance: Chinese Communist Party
- Branch: Chinese Workers' and Peasants' Red Army (Republic of China (1912–1949)) Eighth Route Army of the National Revolutionary Army
- Service years: 1930–1942
- Rank: General
- Commands: Deputy Chief Of Staff, Eighth Route Army
- Conflicts: Long March; Hundred Regiments Offensive; Battle of Huangya Cave †

Zuo Quan (Chinese: 左权; 15 March 1905 – 2 June 1942), also named Zuo Shuren (左叔仁), born in Liling, Hunan, was a general in the Chinese Red Army during the Chinese Communist Revolution and the Second Sino-Japanese War, and a senior staff officer of the Eighth Route Army. He died in combat in 1942.

Zuo graduated in the first class of Whampoa Military Academy, joined the Chinese Communist Party (CCP) in 1925, and helped to found a secret organization amongst Whampoa's pro-communist students, the Huoxingshe, and later another called Young Soldiers United (Qingnian Junren Lianhehui). Zuo was appointed a company commander in the Nationalist Army after graduation. After the end of the First United Front which result in the split between the Communist and the Kuomintang, Zuo travelled to Moscow where he studied at Sun Yatsen University and then the Soviet Military Academy, graduating in 1930. Zuo travelled back to China, arriving in Shanghai with Liu Bocheng, and was sent to the Soviet area in Jiangxi. Zuo became an instructor and then commandant of the First Branch, Red Army Military Academy, and later assumed command of the New 12th Army. After 1933 Zuo was appointed the First Army Group Chief of Staff, and participated in the Long March.

When the Anti Japanese War began in 1937, Zuo became the Deputy Chief of Staff, Eighth Route Army, and was a key organizer in 1938-39 of the highly successful rear area behind Japanese lines upon which the Eighth Route Army's reputation was built. From August to December 1940, Zuo participated in the leadership of the Hundred Regiments Campaign. In 1941, when the Social Affairs Department (Shehuibu) sent an intelligence detachment to the Eighth Route Army to support it, that group was at first sponsored by Zuo Quan who subordinated it to his own staff within a year and subsequently controlled its tasking, personnel, and operations. While under Zuo the detachment successfully established intelligence stations behind enemy lines throughout the Taihang-Shandong area, and set up an agent network in Beiping. In May–June 1942 Zuo engaged in battles to cover the retreat of the Eighth Route Army, and was fatally wounded by a Japanese artillery shell on 2 June 1942 while leading a breakout. After his death the CCP renamed Liao County in Shanxi Province Zuoquan County, in his honor.
