= Bi Yi =

Chinese lieutenant general

- 毕毅

Commander of the People's Liberation Army Information Support Force
- Incumbent
- Assumed office April 2024
- Political Commissar: Li Wei
- Preceded by: New title

Personal details
- Born: 1965 (age 60–61) Dandong, Liaoning, China
- Party: Chinese Communist Party

Military service
- Allegiance: People's Republic of China
- Branch/service: People's Liberation Army Ground Force; People's Liberation Army Strategic Support Force; People's Liberation Army Information Support Force
- Years of service: ?–present
- Rank: Lieutenant general
- Unit: Shenyang Military Region; 40th Group Army; 78th Group Army; Hunan Military District; Training and Administration Department of the Central Military Commission; People's Liberation Army Strategic Support Force; People's Liberation Army Information Support Force

Chinese name
- Simplified Chinese: 毕毅
- Traditional Chinese: 畢毅
Transcriptions
Standard Mandarin
- Hanyu Pinyin: Bì Yì

Bi Yi (Chinese: 毕毅; born 1965) is a lieutenant general in the People's Liberation Army of China, currently serving as commander of the People's Liberation Army Information Support Force, in office since April 2024.

== Biography ==
Bi was born in Dandong, Liaoning, in 1965. He once served as head of the Military Training and Services Department of the Shenyang Military Region and chief of staff of the 40th Group Army. He was deputy commander of the 78th Group Army in 2017 and subsequently commander of the PLA Hunan Military District in May 2018. In 2021, he was appointed deputy head of the Training and Administration Department of the Central Military Commission, he remained in that position until July 2023, when he was chosen as deputy commander of the People's Liberation Army Strategic Support Force. In April 2024, he was commissioned as commander of the newly established People's Liberation Army Information Support Force.

Military offices
Preceded by Huang Yuejin	Commander of the PLA Hunan Military District; 2018–2021	Succeeded by Nan Xiaogang
New title	Commander of the People's Liberation Army Information Support Force; 2024–present	Incumbent
