= Huang Kecheng =

Chinese general

Senior General Huang Kecheng
- 黄克诚 大将
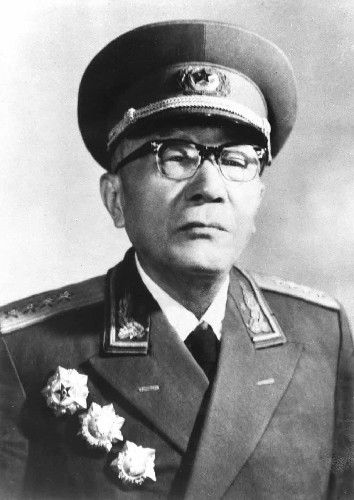
- General of the Army Huang Kecheng giving a speech

Second Secretary of the Central Commission for Discipline Inspection
- In office 11 September 1982 – September 1985
- Preceded by: Deng Yingchao
- Succeeded by: Post abolished

Executive Secretary of the Central Commission for Discipline Inspection
- In office 22 December 1978 – 11 September 1982
- Preceded by: Post established
- Succeeded by: Wang Heshou

Personal details
- Born: 1 October 1902 Yongxing County, Hunan, Qing China
- Died: 28 December 1986 (aged 84) Beijing, China
- Occupation: Politician, writer

Military service
- Allegiance: Chinese Communist Party; China
- Branch/service: People's Liberation Army
- Years of service: 1926–1986
- Rank: Senior General of People's Liberation Army
- Battles/wars: Northern Expedition; Second Sino-Japanese War; Hundred Regiments Offensive; Chinese Civil War; Encirclement Campaigns; Campaign to Defend Siping; Siping Campaign; Liaoshen Campaign; Pingjin Campaign

Huang Kecheng (simplified Chinese: 黄克诚; traditional Chinese: 黃克誠; pinyin: Huáng Kèchéng; October 1, 1902 – December 28, 1986) was a senior general (大将) in the People's Liberation Army. A veteran of the Long March, he commanded the New Fourth Army's 3rd Division during the Second Sino-Japanese War and led it to Manchuria in 1945, and after 1949, he served as party secretary of Hunan and as chief of the general staff of the PLA. At the Lushan Conference of 1959, he was purged with Peng Dehuai after criticizing the Great Leap Forward, and he was persecuted during the Cultural Revolution. After his rehabilitation, he became executive secretary of the Central Commission for Discipline Inspection in 1978, and his 1980 speech on the evaluation of Mao Zedong was published in the official press in 1981.

== Early life and education ==
Huang was born on 1 October 1902, into a peasant family in Xiaqing village in Yongxing County, Hunan. From the age of nine, he received eight years of private schooling with the help of relatives, and in 1920, he entered the county's higher primary school. In 1922, he entered the Hunan Provincial Third Normal School in Hengyang, where he began to study Marxism and took part in student movements. He joined the Chinese Communist Party in 1925.

== Military and politicial career ==
In early 1926, Huang studied at the Central Political Training Institute in Guangzhou, which was run jointly by the Nationalists and the Communists. He then joined the 8th Army of the National Revolutionary Army under Tang Shengzhi, serving as a political instructor at battalion and regimental level during the Northern Expedition. He fought in the capture of Hanyang and Hankou and in battles at Jigongshan and Wushengguan. After the collapse of the alliance between the Nationalists and the Communists in 1927, he returned to his home area to organize peasants in secret.

In early 1928, Huang took part in the South Hunan Uprising, organizing a peasant revolt that captured the county seat of Yongxing, and he became party representative and chief of staff of the Yongxing Red Guard Regiment. He resisted the "leftist" adventurism of the party's South Hunan Special Committee and was criticized as a right opportunist. He then followed Zhu De and Chen Yi to the Jinggang Mountains, where he commanded the 35th Regiment of the 12th Division of the Red Army's Fourth Army, and he was later sent back to south Hunan as a guerrilla commander. After his force scattered on the way, he hid in his home area for a time before travelling to Shanghai to reestablish contact with the party.

In early 1930, Huang was sent to the Fifth Red Army led by Peng Dehuai, where he served as political commissar of several units and took part in attacks on Pingjiang, Xiushui and Yangxin. During the attack on Xiushui, he led the assault up the scaling ladders with a broadsword in hand. From 1931, he served in the Red Army's Third Army Group as director of the 4th Division's political department, political commissar of the 3rd and 1st Divisions, director of the Fifth Army's political department and acting director of the army group's political department. In 1931, he resisted the expansion of the purge of alleged counter-revolutionaries in the "AB League" incident, and he was criticized as a right opportunist and removed as a division commissar. According to a China News Service account, only the direct intervention of Peng Dehuai saved him from arrest and execution.

In early 1932, Huang opposed the provisional party leadership's plan to attack Ganzhou, and after the siege failed, he risked charges of insubordination by leading his troops and some neighboring units out of the encirclement. His repeated criticism of "leftist" adventurism led to further criticism and demotions. In November 1933, he became political commissar of the Third Army Group's 4th Division, which he led during the fifth campaign against the Nationalist encirclements.

=== Long March and Shaanxi ===
In October 1934, Huang led the advance guard at the start of the Long March, breaking through four Nationalist blockade lines, and at the Xiang River, his troops held off repeated attacks by much larger Nationalist forces to cover the crossing of the party's central leadership. In February 1935, after the Third Army Group abolished its divisions, he became political commissar of its 10th Regiment and took part in the Four Crossings of the Chishui River and the Zunyi campaign. After his complaints to his superiors were misunderstood, he was demoted several times, from chief of reconnaissance down to the rank of an ordinary soldier. After the Red Army reached northern Shaanxi, he became head of the health department of the Central Military Commission, political commissar of the 4th Division of the Red Army's First Army Group and head of the organization department of the Red Army's General Political Department, and he took part in the Eastern and Western Expeditions and the Battle of Shanchengbao.

=== Second Sino-Japanese War ===
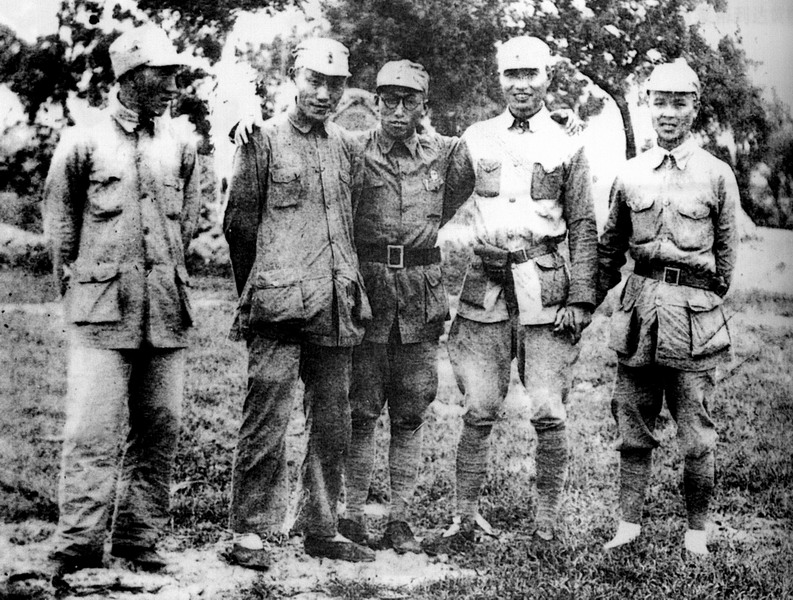
From left: Han Zhenji, Liang Xingchu, Huang Kecheng, Zhang Aiping and Wei Guoqing, marking the meeting of the Fifth Column of the Eighth Route Army and the Northern Jiangsu Command of the New Fourth Army in Dongtai, Jiangsu on October 10, 1940.

At the outbreak of the Second Sino-Japanese War in 1937, Huang became head of the organization department of the Eighth Route Army's General Political Department. After investigating conditions in the army, he proposed restoring the system of political commissars, which had been abolished when the Red Army was reorganized, and the proposal was quickly adopted. He was then appointed political commissar of the 344th Brigade of the 115th Division, and with the brigade commander Xu Haidong, he waged guerrilla warfare behind Japanese lines and helped build the Shanxi–Hebei–Henan base area. In 1939, he led the creation of the Hebei–Shandong–Henan base area.

In February 1940, Huang became political commissar of the Eighth Route Army's 2nd Column and commander and political commissar of the Hebei–Shandong–Henan Military Region. In May, he led the 344th Brigade and other forces south to the Henan–Anhui–Jiangsu border region, where they joined the New Fourth Army's 6th Detachment under Peng Xuefeng to form the Eighth Route Army's 4th Column, of which he became political commissar. In August, he reorganized the communist forces in northeastern Anhui into the 5th Column, which he commanded as commander and political commissar. He then led it east and south to Yancheng and Funing, meeting the New Fourth Army's forces from the Battle of Huangqiao at Baiju, and together they created the communist base area in northern Jiangsu, linking the party's bases in northern and central China.

After the New Fourth Army incident of January 1941, Huang's forces were reorganized as the 3rd Division of the New Fourth Army, and he became its commander and political commissar, commander and political commissar of the Northern Jiangsu Military Region and secretary of the party's Northern Jiangsu Regional Committee. In April 1944, he began local counteroffensives, including the battle of Gaogou and Yangkou, which linked the Huaihai and Yanfu base areas. Around the time of the Japanese surrender, he directed the Funing campaign and, in September 1945, the Lianghuai campaign, in which his forces captured Huaiyin and Huai'an and took most of northern Jiangsu.

=== Chinese Civil War ===
On 14 September 1945, Huang telegraphed the party's central leadership in his own name, proposing to send troops at once to Manchuria to create a large strategic base, with at least 50,000 and ideally 100,000 men. On September 23, the Central Military Commission ordered him to lead more than 30,000 troops of the 3rd Division to the northeast, and after setting out on September 28, they reached the area of Jinzhou in Liaoning on November 25. He then advised that the communist forces avoid fighting for the large cities and main railways and instead occupy small and medium cities and build rural base areas. From January 1946, he was commander of the West Manchuria Military Region and acting secretary of the party's West Manchuria Sub-bureau, and in March and April, after the withdrawal of Soviet troops, his forces took Siping and Changchun. In April 1946, the 3rd Division's main force fought in the second battle of Siping.

In June 1946, Huang and Li Fuchun sent the central leadership an analysis of the situation, which argued that the party should prepare to fight on rather than make concessions. In his reply of July 6, 1946, Mao said that much of their analysis was sound but that it underestimated the difficulties facing the United States and Chiang Kai-shek, and he wrote that the main policy toward them should be struggle rather than concession.

In August 1947, Huang became deputy commander of the Northeast Democratic Allied Army and commander and political commissar of its logistics, building a logistics system and regulations for the army. In April 1948, he became secretary of the party's Hebei–Chahar–Rehe–Liaoning Sub-bureau, political commissar of its military region and political commissar of the 2nd Army Group of the Northeast Field Army, and he organized support for the main forces in the Liaoshen campaign. In January 1949, after the capture of Tianjin, he became director of the Tianjin Military Control Commission and party secretary of the city.

In March 1949, before Hunan had been taken by the communists, the central leadership appointed Huang secretary of the Hunan provincial party committee, and in May, he led cadres south from Tianjin as the "Xiangjiang Brigade". He became party secretary and commander and political commissar of the Hunan Military District, leading the suppression of bandits, the campaign against counter-revolutionaries, land reform and economic recovery in the province. In 1952, he returned to his home village for the first time in 24 years, declining a sedan chair prepared by villagers and walking about 15 kilometres (9.3 mi) along mountain paths.

=== People's Republic of China ===
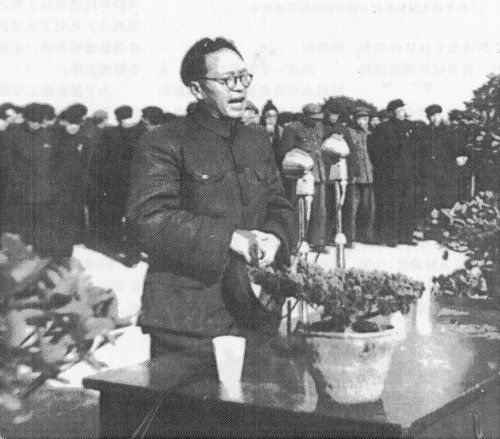
Huang speaking at a mass rally in Changsha (1952)

In November 1952, Huang became deputy chief of the general staff of the People's Liberation Army and director and political commissar of its General Logistics Department, where he established regular rules for logistics throughout the army. In April 1954, Mao sent Peng Dehuai and Huang a telegram on the risks facing the Vietnamese communist forces during the Battle of Dien Bien Phu. In 1954, he became secretary-general of the Central Military Commission and a vice minister of national defense. In 1955, he was made a senior general. In September 1956, he was elected to the 8th Central Committee and became a secretary of its Secretariat. He was also a member of the Standing Committee of the 1st National People's Congress and of the 1st and 2nd National Defence Councils.

In July 1958, during the planning for the Second Taiwan Strait Crisis, Mao wrote to Peng and Huang deciding to delay the bombardment of Kinmen. In October 1958, Huang became chief of the general staff of the PLA, and he carried out a reduction and reorganization of the army. That month, Mao wrote to Huang and Peng with instructions for a temporary halt to the shelling of Kinmen.

=== Purge ===
At the Lushan Conference of 1959, Huang openly criticized the "leftist" errors of the Great Leap Forward and the people's communes, and he was labelled a member of an "anti-party clique" with Peng Dehuai, Zhang Wentian and Zhou Xiaozhou. He was stripped of all his posts and placed under investigation for many years. He nominally remained a secretary of the Secretariat until September 1962, the month of the 10th Plenum of the 8th Central Committee, which he was ordered to leave partway through. In 1965, he was demoted to vice governor of Shanxi. During the Cultural Revolution, he was imprisoned and suffered severe physical and mental abuse. In 1975, his case was reclassified as a "contradiction among the people", and he was resettled in Taiyuan.

=== Rehabilitation and discipline work ===
In December 1977, Huang was appointed an adviser to the Central Military Commission. At the Third Plenum of the 11th Central Committee in December 1978, he was added to the Central Committee and elected executive secretary of the newly restored Central Commission for Discipline Inspection, although he was by then more than 70 years old. The Central Committee formally rehabilitated him in June 1980. He worked on correcting the party's style of work and on redressing wrongful convictions, and Chen Yun called him "a model for a generation".

In late November 1980, at a seminar of the Central Commission for Discipline Inspection, Huang gave a speech on the evaluation of Mao, arguing that Mao's achievements were primary and his errors secondary and that responsibility for errors such as the Anti-Rightist Campaign and the Great Leap Forward should be shared by the leadership. A version of the speech was published in April 1981, and The Christian Science Monitor noted that Huang, although he had suffered far more from Mao's wrath than Deng Xiaoping, essentially followed Deng's line that it would be "extremely harmful" to say that Mao had done nothing good. From 1982, he was second secretary of the commission, and he continued to work although he had become blind in both eyes. In September 1985, he was among 31 veteran members who left the Central Commission for Discipline Inspection.

Huang died in Beijing on 28 December 1986, at the age of 84.

== Personal life ==
In 1941, Huang married Tang Dihua, with Song Naide, the head of the anti-Japanese democratic government of Funing County, acting as matchmaker, and the day after the wedding, she went to work on a sea dyke construction site. Their children included a daughter, Huang Nan, and two sons, Huang Xu and Huang Qing. Their children included a daughter, Huang Nan, and two sons, Huang Xu and Huang Qing. The two older children were left with their maternal grandmother during the war, and the family was reunited in 1949.

== Awards and honors ==
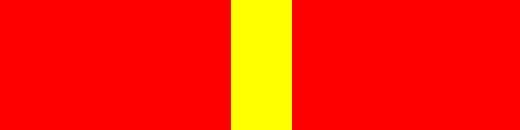
Order of August 1 (1st Class Medal) (1955)
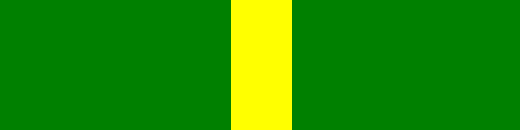
Order of Independence and Freedom (1st Class Medal) (1955)
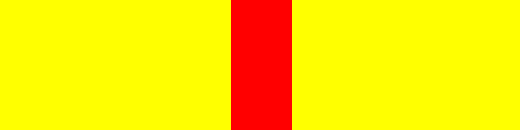
Order of Liberation (1st Class Medal) (1955)

His former residence in Xiaqing village, Yongxing, has been preserved as a memorial site.

Military offices
New title	Political commissar of the PLA Hunan Military District; 1949–1952	Succeeded by Jin Ming
Preceded by Xiao Jinguang	Commander of the PLA Hunan Military District; 1950–1952	Succeeded by Tang Tianji
Preceded by Su Yu	PLA Chief of General Staff; 1958–1959	Succeeded by Luo Ruiqing
