= Zheng Weiping =

Chinese general

- 郑卫平

Political Commissar of the People's Liberation Army Strategic Support Force
- In office September 2017 – December 2020
- Preceded by: Liu Fulian
- Succeeded by: Li Wei

Political Commissar of the Eastern Theater Command
- In office February 2016 – September 2017
- Preceded by: New position
- Succeeded by: He Ping

Political Commissar of the Nanjing Military Region
- In office October 2012 – January 2016
- Preceded by: Chen Guoling
- Succeeded by: Office abolished

Personal details
- Born: July 1955 (age 70) Wanrong County, Shanxi
- Party: Chinese Communist Party

Military service
- Allegiance: China
- Branch/service: PLA Rocket Force; PLA Strategic Support Force
- Years of service: 1970–2020
- Rank: General

Zheng Weiping (simplified Chinese: 郑卫平; traditional Chinese: 鄭衛平; pinyin: Zhèng Wèipíng; born July 1955) is a general (shangjiang) of the People's Liberation Army (PLA) of China. He was Political Commissar of the Strategic Support Force between 2017 and 2020. He previously served as Political Commissar of the Nanjing Military Region (2012–2016) and Political Commissar of the Eastern Theater Command (2016–2017).

== Biography ==
Zheng was born in Wanrong County, Shanxi province. He served at one point as secretary to General Li Jinai. In 2003 he began a stint overseeing political education at the National Defence University. In 2005 he became political commissar of the 41st Group Army. In 2007, he became the head of the political department of the Guangzhou Military Region. In October 2012 he was appointed political commissar of the Nanjing Military Region. On 31 July 2015, Zheng was promoted to general (shang jiang), the highest rank for Chinese military officers in active service.

In 2016 Zheng became the inaugural political commissar of the newly established Eastern Theater Command. In September 2017 he was appointed political commissar of the Strategic Support Force, replacing General Liu Fulian. He Ping succeeded Zheng as the Eastern TC commissar.

On February 28, 2021, he was appointed vice-chairperson of the National People's Congress Education, Science, Culture and Public Health Committee.

Zheng has been a member of the 18th and 19th Central Committee of the Chinese Communist Party.

Military offices
Preceded by Zhang Rucheng	Political Commissar of the 41st Group Army; 2005–2007	Succeeded by Chen Pinghua
Preceded by Chen Guoling	Political Commissar of the Nanjing Military Region; 2012–2016	Succeeded by Office abolished
New title	Political Commissar of the Eastern Theater Command; 2016–2017	Succeeded by He Ping
Preceded by Liu Fulian	Political Commissar of the People's Liberation Army Strategic Support Force; 2017–2020	Succeeded by Li Wei
