= Yang Cheng =

Yang Cheng, may refer to:

- Yang Cheng (football goalkeeper) (born 1985), a Chinese football goalkeeper who currently plays for Hebei China Fortune in the Chinese Super League.
- Yang Cheng (general) (born 1964), is a lieutenant general of the People's Liberation Army (PLA) and the current political commissar of the Xinjiang Military District.
- Yang Cheng, a fictional character in the 2025 television series To Be Hero X
