= Liu Fulian =

Chinese general

- 刘福连

Political Commissar of the People's Liberation Army Strategic Support Force
- In office December 2015 – January 2017
- Preceded by: New title
- Succeeded by: Zheng Weiping

Political Commissar of the Beijing Military Region
- In office December 2009 – December 2015
- Preceded by: Fu Tinggui
- Succeeded by: Position revoked

Personal details
- Born: August 1952 (age 74) Lai'an County, Anhui, China
- Party: Chinese Communist Party
- Education: PLA Army Infantry Academy

Military service
- Allegiance: People's Republic of China
- Branch/service: People's Liberation Army Ground Force
- Years of service: 1970–2017
- Rank: General

Chinese name
- Simplified Chinese: 刘福连
- Traditional Chinese: 劉福連
Transcriptions
Standard Mandarin
- Hanyu Pinyin: Liú Fúlián

Liu Fulian (Chinese: 刘福连; pinyin: Liú Fúlián; born August 1952) is a retired general (shangjiang) of the Chinese People's Liberation Army (PLA). He served as Political Commissar of People's Liberation Army Strategic Support Force.

== Biography ==
Liu was born in Lai'an County, Anhui province. He joined the People's Liberation Army in 1970, and began work as a clerk. He rose through the ranks serving in mostly political roles, such as political liaison, political instructor, and did not have any known combat experience. In December 2003, Liu became the head of the political department of the 27th Group Army. In December 2006, he was promoted to Political Commissar of the Beijing Garrison. In 2008, he was promoted to the rank of lieutenant general. In December 2009, he was named Political Commissar of the Beijing Military Region. In July 2013 he was promoted to general, the highest non-wartime rank in the PLA. In 2016, he was made the inaugural Political Commissar of People's Liberation Army Strategic Support Force. In 2017, he left his post as political commissar.

Liu was a delegate to the 17th National Congress of the Chinese Communist Party, and was a member of the 18th Central Committee of the Chinese Communist Party.

In 2019, Fulian was demoted for bribery.

Military offices
Preceded by Fu Tinggui	Political Commissar of the Beijing Military Region; 2009–2015	Succeeded by Position revoked
New title	Political Commissar of the People's Liberation Army Strategic Support Force; 2015–2017	Succeeded by Zheng Weiping
