= People's Liberation Army Cyberspace Force =

Cyber arm of the People's Liberation Army

- 中国人民解放军网络空间部队
- Founded: 19 April 2024; 2 years ago
- Country: China
- Allegiance: Chinese Communist Party
- Type: Cyber force
- Role: Cyberwarfare
- Part of: People's Liberation Army

Commanders
- Commander: Lieutenant General Zhang Minghua
- Political Commissar: Lieutenant General Han Xiaodong

Insignia
- Symbol

- Flag

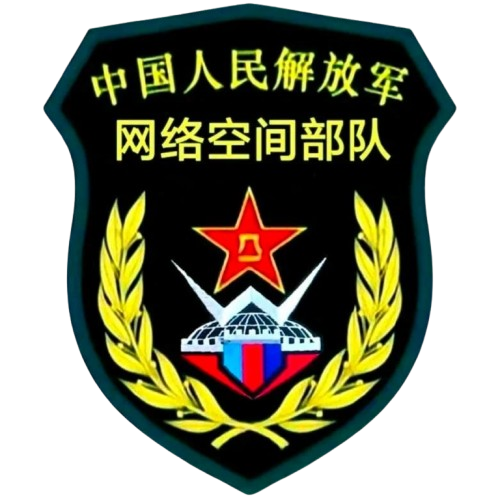
- Sleeve badge

The People's Liberation Army Cyberspace Force is the cyber force service branch of the People's Liberation Army. It was established on 19 April 2024, followed by the dissolution of the People's Liberation Army Strategic Support Force (PLASSF). The Cyberspace Force received the functions of the former PLASSF's Network Systems Department.

== History ==
The Cyberspace Force was established on 19 April 2024 following as one of the new successor branches which followed the dissolution of the People's Liberation Army Strategic Support Force (PLASSF). The Cyberspace Force has the functions of the former PLASSF Network Systems Department. The other new branches created were the PLA Aerospace Force and the PLA Information Support Force.

At the creation of the Cyberspace Force, the Ministry of National Defense stated in relation to its role that "developing the Cyberspace Force and cyber security and defense means are important for reinforcing national cyber border defense, promptly detecting and countering network intrusions and maintaining national cyber sovereignty and information security."

The Cyberspace Force operates five Technical Reconnaissance Bases that align with the PLA's five theater commands. The force's Cyberspace Operations Base oversees the country's offensive cyberwarfare, psychological warfare, and advanced cybersecurity research.

The PLA Cyberspace Force made their first public appearance at the 2025 China Victory Day Parade on September 3, 2025.

== Structure ==
The Cyberspace Force is broken down into the General Staff Department, and the Political Work Department. Below these two departments is the following breakdown:

=== Logistics Department ===
Unit 32047 is part of the Logistics Department.

=== Equipment Department ===
The Equipment Department is broken down into seven local military representative offices located in:

- Shanghai
- Tianjin
- Nanjing
- Chengdu
- Guangzhou
- Shenzhen
- Wuhan

=== Bureaus ===
There are also two bureaus under the Cyberspace Force: the Network Bureau, and the Information Bureau.

== PLA Information Engineering University ==
The PLA Information Engineering University (IEU) is the PLA's research institute for the study of information warfare.

== Leadership ==
=== Commander ===
- Zhang Minghua (April 2024 – present)

=== Political Commissar ===
- Han Xiaodong (April 2024 – present)

== Ranks ==
Officer ranks

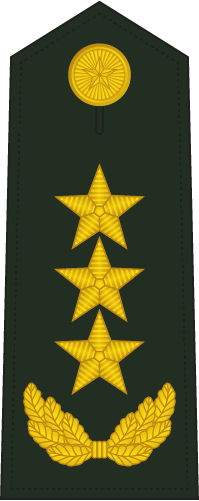
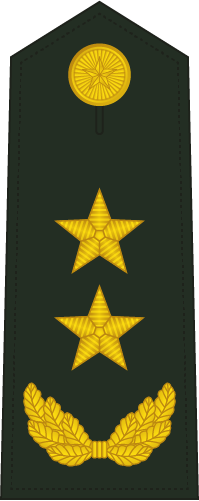
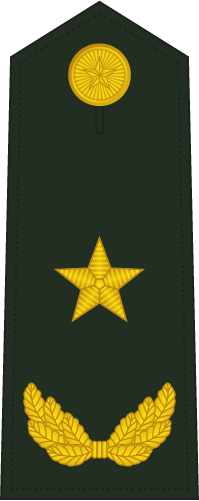
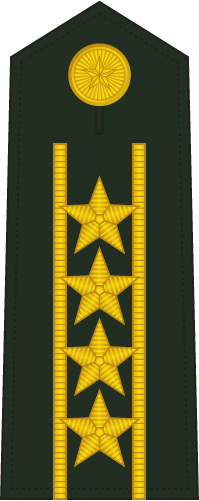
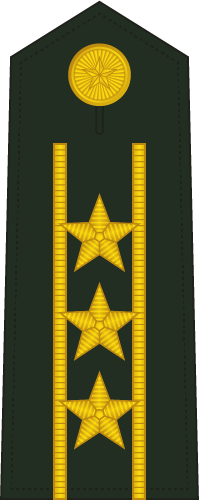
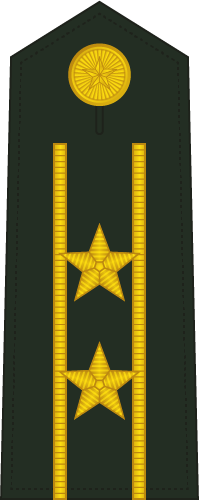
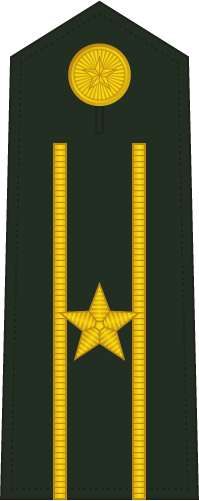
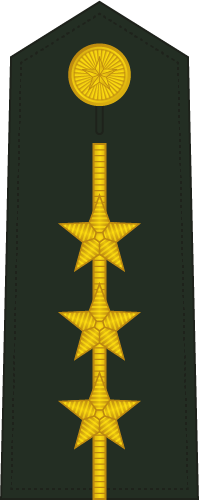
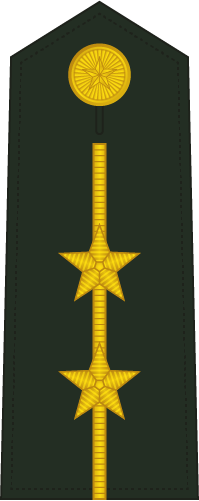
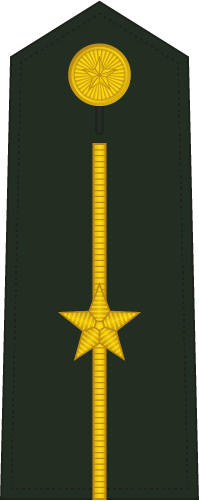
Rank group	General / flag officers			Senior officers				Junior officers
PLA Cyberspace Force
PLA Cyberspace Force	上将; Shàngjiàng	中将; Zhōngjiàng	少将; Shàojiàng	大校; Dàxiào	上校; Shàngxiào	中校; Zhōngxiào	少校; Shàoxiào	上尉; Shàngwèi	中尉; Zhōngwèi	少尉; Shàowèi

Enlisted and NCO ranks

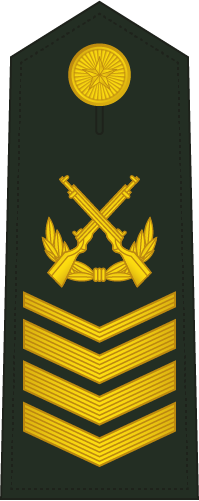
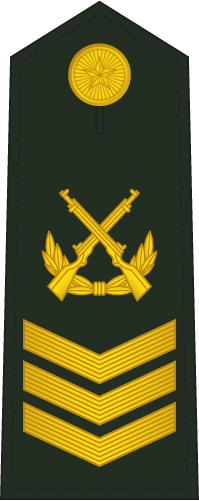
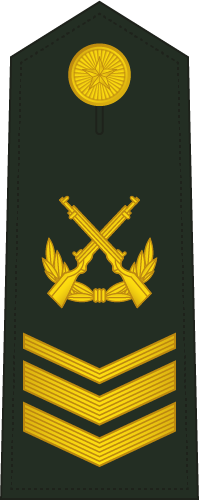
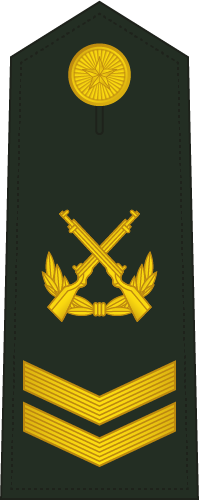
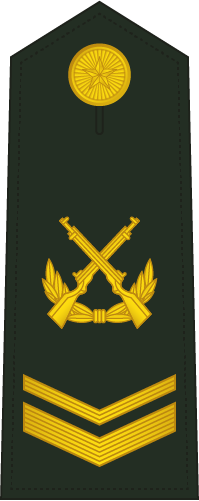
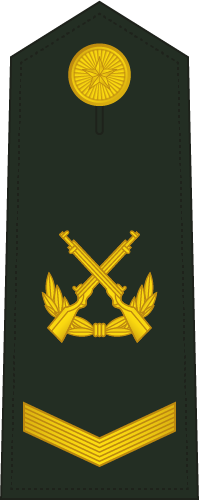
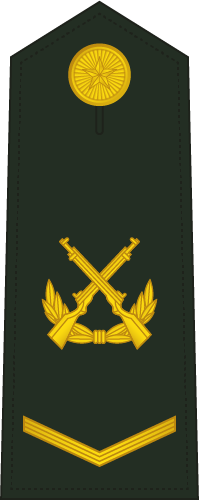
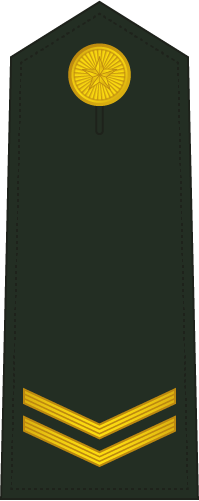
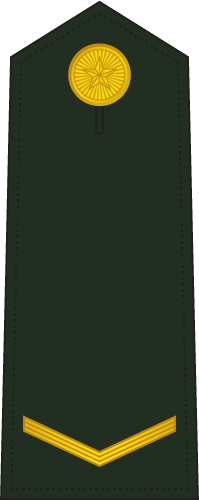
Rank group	Senior NCOs						Junior NCOs	Enlisted
PLA Cyberspace Force
PLA Cyberspace Force	一级军士长; Yījí jūnshìzhǎng	二级军士长; Èrjí jūnshìzhǎng	三级军士长; Sānjí jūnshìzhǎng	四级军士长; Sìjí jūnshìzhǎng	上士; Shàngshì	中士; Zhōngshì	下士; Xiàshì	上等兵; Shàngděngbīng	列兵; Lièbīng

== See also ==
- Cyberwarfare by China
