= Chen Guoling =

Chinese general

- 陈国令

Political Commissar of the Nanjing Military Region
- In office July 2007 – November 2012
- Preceded by: Lei Mingqiu
- Succeeded by: Zheng Weiping

Personal details
- Born: June 1947 (age 78) Zhuanghe, Liaoning, China
- Party: Chinese Communist Party

Military service
- Allegiance: People's Republic of China
- Branch/service: People's Liberation Army Ground Force
- Years of service: 1968–2012
- Rank: General

Chinese name
- Simplified Chinese: 陈国令
- Traditional Chinese: 陳國令
Transcriptions
Standard Mandarin
- Hanyu Pinyin: Chen Guoling

Chen Guoling (Chinese: 陈国令; pinyin: Chén Guólìng; born June 1947) is a retired general of the Chinese People's Liberation Army (PLA). He served as political commissar of the Nanjing Military Region.

== Biography ==
Chen was born in Zhuanghe, Liaoning, and joined the PLA in 1968. He was promoted to the position of political commissar of the Nanjing Military Region in 2007. He attained his present rank of lieutenant general in July 2006. He is an influential theoretician in the PLA. He has published article in the PLA Daily, supporting the study and practice of the Three Represents concept in the military. He was promoted to General on 19 July 2010. He was a member of the 17th Central Committee of the Chinese Communist Party.

Military offices
Preceded by Lei Mingqiu	Political Commissar of the Nanjing Military Region; 2007–2012	Succeeded by Zheng Weiping
