= Zhang Pinghua =

Chinese politician

Zhang Pinghua

Zhang Pinghua (Chinese: 張平化; May 9, 1907 – July 23, 2001), born to a Hakka family in Yanling County, Hunan, China, was a Chinese politician. His former name was Zhang Chucai (Chinese: 張楚材). He joined the Chinese Communist Party in November 1927. He took part in the Northern Expedition and the "Long March" of the Chinese Workers' and Peasants' Red Army.

After 1949, Zhang worked as a local officer in Hubei, Hunan, and Shanxi one after another. After the Cultural Revolution, he was appointed as the Head of the CCP Publicity Department and then the Vice President of the Central Party School of the Chinese Communist Party. Zhang died on July 23, 2001.

Military offices
Preceded by Zhou Xiaozhou	Political commissar of the PLA Hunan Military District; 1960–1966	Succeeded by Yang Dayi
