= Cyber force =

Military branch for cyber warfare

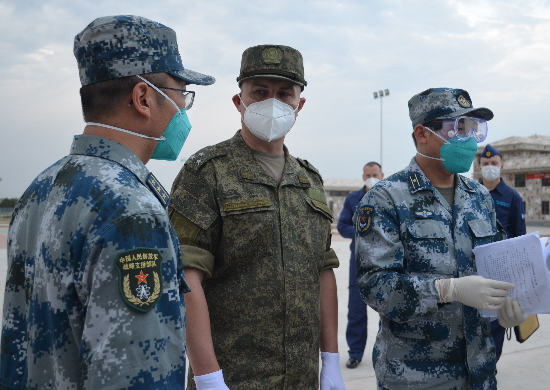
People's Liberation Army Strategic Support Force personnel with a Russian military soldier. The PLA Strategic Support Force was established in 2015, becoming the world's first independent cyber force.

A cyber force is a military branch of a nation's armed forces that conducts military operations in cyberspace and cyberwarfare. The world's first independent cyber force was the People's Liberation Army Strategic Support Force, which was established in 2015 and also serves as China's space force. As of 2024, the world's only independent cyber forces are the People's Liberation Army Cyberspace Force, the German Cyber and Information Domain Service, Norwegian Cyber Defence Force, and the Singapore Digital and Intelligence Service.

Most other countries organize their cyber forces into other military services or joint commands. Examples of joint cyber commands includes the United States Cyber Command

== History ==
In 2015, China created the world's first independent cyber force, establishing the People's Liberation Army Strategic Support Force. This was followed by Germany's establishment of the Cyber and Information Domain Service as the world's second cyber force in 2017 and Singapore's creation of the Digital and Intelligence Service as the world's third cyber force in 2022.

Within the United States, the United States Air Force was the early leader in military cyber operations. In 1995, it established the 609th Information Warfare Squadron, which was the first organization in the world to combine offensive and defensive cyber operation in support of military forces. Initially viewing cyber as a subdivision of information warfare, the Air Intelligence Agency controlled many of the early cyber missions. The United States Army and United States Navy believed that the Air Force was attempting to seize the cyber mission for itself, pressuring the Air Force to stop the activation of Air Force Cyber Command.

Instead, United States Cyber Command was created as a subunified command under United States Strategic Command in 2009 and Army Cyber Command, Fleet Cyber Command, Marine Corps Forces Cyberspace Command, and Twenty-Fourth Air Force were created as service components. U.S. Cyber Command traces its history back to the 1998 establishment of Joint Task Force – Computer Network Defense, and its 2000 redesignation as Joint Task Force – Computer Network Operations under United States Space Command. Following the inactivation of Space Command and its merger into United States Strategic Command in 2002, Joint Task Force – Computer Network Operations was split into Joint Task Force – Global Network Operations and Joint Functional Component Command – Network Warfare in 2004 before being reunified under U.S. Cyber Command. In 2014, the U.S. Army established the Cyber Corps, merging the offensive cyber role of the Military Intelligence Corps and defensive cyber role of the Signal Corps.

In 2018, Cyber Command was elevated to a full unified combatant command. Periodic calls for the creation of a U.S. Cyber Force have occurred.

In September 2025, the Verkhovna Rada of Ukraine passed a law approving the creation of the Cyber Forces of Ukraine to modernize and expand the Armed Forces of Ukraine's cyberwarfare capabilities amid the Russo-Ukrainian war.

== Cyber forces ==
The following list outlines the independent cyber forces currently in operation around the world:

- (Belgium) Belgian Cyber Force
- People's Liberation Army Cyberspace Force
- (Germany) Cyber and Information Domain Service
- (Norway) Norwegian Cyber Defence Force
- (Singapore) Digital and Intelligence Service
- (United Kingdom) National Cyber Force

=== Proposed ===
- Cyber Forces (Ukraine)

== See also ==
- National Cyber Security Centre (disambiguation)
- Cyber-power literacy
