= Jin Ming =

Chinese politician

Jin Ming (Chinese: 金明; pinyin: Jīn Míng; 20 December 1913 – 15 March 1998) was a Chinese politician. He was originally from Yidu County, now known as Qingzhou city, in Shandong province. In February 1932, he joined the Communist Youth League of China; in the summer of the same year became a member of the Chinese Communist Party and participated in the Yidu Uprising in August.

In 1982, he served as a member of the Central Advisory Commission. He also served as the secretary-general of the State Council of the People's Republic of China, the secretary of the CPC Hebei Committee, among other posts. He died in Beijing in 1998.

Military offices
Preceded by Huang Kecheng	Political commissar of the PLA Hunan Military District; 1952–1953	Succeeded by Zhou Xiaozhou
Party political offices
Preceded by Huang Kecheng	Communist Party Chief of Hunan; 1952–1953	Succeeded by Zhou Xiaozhou
Preceded by Liu Zihou	Communist Party Chief of Hebei; 1979–1982	Succeeded by Gao Yang
