= Zhou Xiaozhou (politician) =

Chinese politician and communist revolutionary

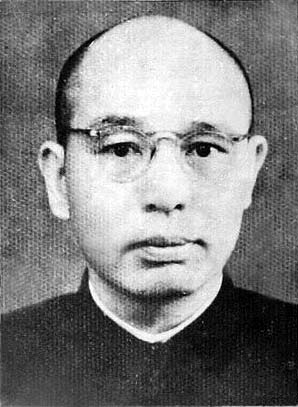
Zhou Siaozhou in 1953

Zhou Xiaozhou (Chinese: 周小舟; 1912 – December 26, 1966) was a Chinese politician and communist revolutionary, who served as Communist Party Secretary of Hunan from 1953 to 1957. He committed suicide during the Cultural Revolution.

He was born in Xiangtan, Hunan Province. He attended Hunan University, then won a scholarship to continue his studies at Beijing Normal University. He was an agent for the Communists during the Second United Front between the Kuomintang and Communist Party.

After the foundation of the People's Republic of China in 1949, Zhou served as the Communist Party Secretary of his home province between 1953 and 1957. At the Lushan Conference in 1959, Zhou Xiaozhou and his successor, Zhou Hui, along with Huang Kecheng and Zhang Wentian, lent their support to Peng Dehuai in questioning the wisdom of the Great Leap Forward. He was thus branded a traitor, stripped of his positions, and sent to re-education through labour.

In 1962, Zhou was restored to an academic position in Guangzhou, seemingly regaining his political footing. However, at the outset of the Cultural Revolution, Zhou became an easy target for abuse due to his role in criticizing the Great Leap Forward, and committed suicide by drug overdose at the age of 54. He was posthumously rehabilitated in February 1979, under the leadership of Deng Xiaoping.

Party political offices
Preceded by Jin Ming	Communist Party Secretary of Hunan; 1953–1957	Succeeded by Zhou Hui
Military offices
Preceded by Jin Ming	Political commissar of the PLA Hunan Military District; 1953–1959	Succeeded by Zhang Pinghua
