= Hunan Military District =

- 中国人民解放军湖南省军区
- Founded: 9 August 1949; 76 years ago
- Country: People's Republic of China
- Allegiance: Chinese Communist Party
- Type: Military district
- Role: Command and control
- Part of: People's Liberation Army
- Headquarters: Changsha, Hunan

Commanders
- Commander: Major general (shaojiang) Lin Jiachun
- Political Commisar: Major general (shaojiang) Ma Yongsheng

Chinese name
- Simplified Chinese: 中国人民解放军湖南省军区
- Traditional Chinese: 中國人民解放軍湖南省軍區
Transcriptions
Standard Mandarin
- Hanyu Pinyin: Zhōngguó Rénmín Jiěfàngjūn Húnánshěng Jūnqū

The Hunan Military District (Chinese: 中国人民解放军湖南省军区; full name People's Liberation Army Hunan Military District or PLA Hunan Military District) is a military district of the National Defense Mobilization Department of the Central Military Commission in China.

== History ==
The Hunan Military District is established in Changsha, capital of Hunan province, on 9 August 1949, by the 12th Corps of the Fourth Field Army.

== Leaders ==
=== Commanders ===
Name (English)	Name (Chinese)	Tenure begins	Tenure ends	Note
Xiao Jinguang	萧劲光	August 1949	March 1950	
Huang Kecheng	黄克诚	March 1950	March 1952	
Tang Tianji	唐天际	January 1952	April 1953	
Wen Niansheng	文年生	April 1953	February 1954	
Yang Meisheng	杨梅生	September 1954	April 1961	
Long Shujin	龙书金	March 1962	August 1968	
Yang Dayi	杨大易	August 1968	July 1975	
Tong Guogui	童国贵	July 1975	February 1980	
Liu Zhanrong	刘占荣	February 1980	May 1983	
Jiang Jinliu	蒋金流	May 1983	November 1989	
Wen Guoqing	文国庆	November 1989	June 1990	
Pang Weiqiang	庞为强	June 1990	June 1996	
Zhang Deren	张德仁	June 1996	July 2002	
Zheng Zhidong	郑治栋	July 2002	March 2009	
Zhang Yongda	张永大	March 2009	July 2012	
Huang Yuejin	黄跃进	July 2012	April 2018	
Bi Yi	毕毅	May 2018	October 2021	
Nan Xiaogang	南小冈	October 2021	January 2023	
Wang Yu	王宇	January 2023	April 2025	
Lin Jiachun	林佳春	29 April 2025		

=== Political commissars ===
Name (English)	Name (Chinese)	Tenure begins	Tenure ends	Note
Huang Kecheng	黄克诚	August 1949	September 1952	
Jin Ming	金明	September 1952	October 1953	
Zhou Xiaozhou	周小舟	October 1953	September 1959	
Zhang Pinghua	张平化	February 1960	June 1966	
Yang Dayi	杨大易	August 1968	May 1970	
Bu Zhanya	卜占亚	May 1970	October 1971	
Hua Guofeng	华国锋	October 1971	June 1977	
Mao Zhiyong	毛致用	October 1977	May 1983	
Gu Shanqing	谷善庆	May 1983	April 1988	
Wu Aiqun	吴爱群	April 1988	June 1990	
Jin Feng	金峰	June 1990	February 1993	
Deng Hanmin	邓汉民	February 1993	February 1995	
Qiao Xinzhu	乔新柱	February 1995	December 2001	
Li Jinwei	李今伟	December 2001	September 2006	
Yang Zhongmin	杨忠民	September 2006	August 2011	
Li Youxin	李有新	August 2011	December 2014	
Ma Biqiang	马必强	December 2014	January 2016	
Feng Yi	冯毅	April 2017	July 2023	
Ma Yongsheng	马永生	July 2023		
