= He Ping (general) =

Chinese general

- 何平

Political Commissar of the Eastern Theater Command
- In office September 2017 – June 2023
- Preceded by: Zheng Weiping
- Succeeded by: Liu Qingsong

Personal details
- Born: November 1957 (age 68) Nanchong, Sichuan
- Party: Chinese Communist Party

Military service
- Allegiance: People's Republic of China
- Branch/service: People's Liberation Army Ground Force
- Years of service: ?–present
- Rank: General

He Ping (Chinese: 何平; pinyin: Hé Píng; born November 1957) is a general of the Chinese People's Liberation Army (PLA). He served as the political commissar of the Eastern Theater Command from 2017 to 2023.

== Biography ==
He Ping was born in November 1957 in Nanchong, Sichuan Province.

He spent most of his career in the former Chengdu Military Region. In 2008 he was appointed Director of the Political Department of the 14th Group Army, and attained the rank of major general the next year. He became Deputy Political Commissar of the 14th Army in 2011, and deputy director of the Political Department of the Chengdu MR and Political Commissar of the Joint Logistics Department of the Chengdu MR in 2013. In July 2014 he was appointed Political Commissar of the Intelligence Department of the former PLA General Staff Department.

In 2016, He was appointed Director of the Political Department of the newly established Western Theater Command. In September 2017, he was transferred and promoted to Political Commissar of the Eastern Theater Command, succeeding General Zheng Weiping.

In October 2017, he was elected as a member of the 19th Central Committee of the Chinese Communist Party.

Military offices
Preceded by Yao Liyun	Political Commissar of the Joint Staff Department of the Central Military Commission Intelligence Bureau; 2014–2016	Succeeded by Position revoked
New title	Director of the Political Work Department of the Western Theater Command; 2016–2017	Succeeded by Zhao Ruibao
Preceded by Zheng Weiping	Political Commissar of the Eastern Theater Command; 2017–present	Incumbent
