= Fu Tinggui =

Chinese general

- 符廷贵

Political Commissar of the Beijing Military Region
- In office December 2003 – December 2009
- Preceded by: Du Tiehuan
- Succeeded by: Liu Fulian

Personal details
- Born: August 1944 (age 82) Panshan County, Manchukuo
- Party: Chinese Communist Party
- Education: PLA National Defence University; Central Party School of the Chinese Communist Party

Military service
- Allegiance: People's Republic of China
- Branch/service: People's Liberation Army Ground Force
- Years of service: 1963–2009
- Rank: General

Chinese name
- Simplified Chinese: 符廷贵
- Traditional Chinese: 符廷貴
Transcriptions
Standard Mandarin
- Hanyu Pinyin: Fú Tíngguì

Fu Tinggui (Chinese: 符廷贵; born August 1944) is a general of the People's Liberation Army of the People's Republic of China. He served as the political commissar in PLA Beijing Military Region since 2003 until 2009.

== Biography ==
Born in Panshan, Manchukuo, Fu joined the army in December 1963 and joined Chinese Communist Party (CCP) in April 1966.

From September 1985 to July 1988, he studied in basic department of PLA National Defense University. In August 1991, he was promoted to director of political department of Jilin provincial military region. From August 1994 to July 2001, he was political commissar of an army group. He studied at CCP Central Party School from August 1992 to December 1994, majoring in economics management. From March - July 2001, he was enrolled in a training program for senior officials at PLA National Defense University. From July 2001 to December 2003, he was director of political department and a standing committee member of CCP committee in Beijing Military Region. Since December 2003, he has been serving as political commissar of Beijing MR.

Fu was made major general in July 1994, lieutenant general in July 2002, and general on June 24, 2006.

He was a member of 16th CCP and 17th Central Committee.

Military offices
Preceded by Lü Zhi	Director of the Political Department of the Beijing Military Region; 2001–2003	Succeeded by Dong Wancai
Preceded by Du Tiehuan	Political Commissar of the Beijing Military Region; 2003–2009	Succeeded by Liu Fulian
