= Zhao Ruibao =

- 赵瑞宝

Director of the Political Work Department of the Western Theater Command
- Incumbent
- Assumed office April 2018
- Preceded by: He Ping

Personal details
- Born: March 1960 (age 66) Yanzhou County, Shandong, China
- Party: Chinese Communist Party

Military service
- Allegiance: People's Republic of China
- Branch/service: People's Liberation Army Ground Force
- Years of service: ?–present
- Rank: Lieutenant general

Chinese name
- Simplified Chinese: 赵瑞宝
- Traditional Chinese: 趙瑞寶
Transcriptions
Standard Mandarin
- Hanyu Pinyin: Zhào Ruìbǎo

Zhao Ruibao (Chinese: 赵瑞宝; born March 1960) is a lieutenant general (zhongjiang) of the People's Liberation Army (PLA) serving as director of the Political Work Department of the Western Theater Command, succeeding He Ping in 2017. He is a delegate to 13th National People's Congress.

== Biography ==
Zhao was born in Yanzhou County (now Yanzhou District of Jining), Shandong, in March 1960. He served in the Second Artillery Corps for a long time before being appointed political commissar of PLA Rocket Force University of Engineering in October 2009. He became political commissar of the 51st Base in 2011 before being assigned to the similar position in the 52nd Base (later renamed 61st Base) in 2014. In April 2018, he became deputy political commissar of the Western Theater Command and director of the Political Work Department.

He was promoted to the rank of major general (shaojiang) in July 2010 and lieutenant general (zhongjiang) in June 2019.

Military offices
Preceded by Ma Li	Political Commissar of PLA Rocket Force University of Engineering; 2009–2011	Succeeded by Ma Li
Preceded by He Ping	Director of the Political Work Department of the Western Theater Command; 2018–present	Incumbent
