= Li Wei (general, born 1960) =

Chinese military officer

- 李伟

Political Commissar of the People's Liberation Army Information Support Force
- In office 19 April 2024 – October 2026
- Preceded by: Office established

Political Commissar of the People's Liberation Army Strategic Support Force
- In office December 2020 – 19 April 2024
- Preceded by: Zheng Weiping
- Succeeded by: Office abolished

Personal details
- Born: September 1960 (age 66) Jiyuan, Henan, China
- Party: Chinese Communist Party (expelled in 2026)
- Occupation: Military officer

Military service
- Allegiance: People's Republic of China
- Branch/service: People's Liberation Army Strategic Support Force
- Years of service: ?-present
- Rank: General

Chinese name
- Traditional Chinese: 李偉
- Simplified Chinese: 李伟
Transcriptions
Standard Mandarin
- Hanyu Pinyin: Lǐ Wěi

Li Wei (Chinese: 李伟; born September 1960) is a general (Shangjiang) of the People's Liberation Army (PLA) of China. He served as the political commissar of the People's Liberation Army Information Support Force. He was promoted to the rank of major general (shaojiang) in July 2008, lieutenant general (zhongjiang) in July 2016, and general (Shangjiang) in December 2020. He served as the political commissar of the People's Liberation Army Strategic Support Force from 2020 to 2024. In 2026, Li was expelled from the Chinese Communist Party.

== Biography ==
Li was born in Jiyuan, Henan, in September 1960. He served in Lanzhou Military Region for a long time. He was director of Political Department of the 47th Group Army in July 2007 and its deputy political commissar in 2010. In October 2010, he succeeded Lin Miaoxin as political commissar of Nanjiang Military District. In September 2013, he became political commissar of the 76th Group Army, concurrently holding the political commissar position of Xinjiang Military District in December 2014. He became a member of the Standing Committee of the CPC Xinjiang Uygur Autonomous Region Committee in July 2015 and again in 2018. In December 2020, he was appointed political commissar of People's Liberation Army Strategic Support Force, replacing Zheng Weiping. On 19 April 2024, he was appointed as the political commissar of the newly established Information Support Force.

On 29 October 2026, the fifth plenary session of the 20th CCP Central Committee reviewed and approved the report of the Discipline Inspection Commission of the Central Military Commission on the "serious violations of discipline and law" by Li and confirmed the Politburo decision to expel him from the CCP.

Military offices
Preceded by Lin Miaoxin	Political Commissar of Nanjiang Military District; 2012–2013	Succeeded by Miao Wenjiang
Preceded by Liu Lei	Political Commissar of the 76th Group Army; 2013–2014	Succeeded by Liu Hongjun (刘洪军)
Preceded by Liu Lei	Political Commissar of Xinjiang Military District; 2014–2020	Succeeded by Yang Cheng
Preceded by Zheng Weiping	Political Commissar of People's Liberation Army Strategic Support Force; 2020–2024	Succeeded by Office abolished
New title	Political Commissar of the People's Liberation Army Information Support Force; 2024–2026	Incumbent
