= Lei Mingqiu =

Chinese retired general

- 雷鸣球

Political Commissar of the Nanjing Military Region
- In office December 2000 – September 2007
- Preceded by: Fang Zuqi
- Succeeded by: Chen Guoling

Director of the Political Department of the Guangzhou Military Region
- In office November 1992 – December 1994
- Preceded by: Fang Zuqi
- Succeeded by: Zhang Guochu

Personal details
- Born: June 1942 (age 84) Qiyang County, Hunan, China
- Party: Chinese Communist Party
- Education: Zhuzhou Aviation Industry School

Military service
- Allegiance: People's Republic of China
- Branch/service: People's Liberation Army Ground Force
- Years of service: 1962–2007
- Rank: General
- Commands: Guangzhou Military Region; Nanjing Military Region

Chinese name
- Simplified Chinese: 雷鸣球
- Traditional Chinese: 雷鳴球
Transcriptions
Standard Mandarin
- Hanyu Pinyin: Léi Míngqiú

Lei Mingqiu (Chinese: 雷鸣球; born June 1942) is a retired general of the People's Liberation Army (PLA) of China. He served as Political Commissar of the Nanjing Military Region.

Lei was born in Qiyang County (now Qidong County), Hunan, in June 1942. He entered aeronautic industry school in Zhuzhou in 1959. He joined the PLA in August 1962, and the Chinese Communist Party in June 1964. In 1971, he became an official at political department of PLA Guangzhou Military Region. He entered PLA political academy in 1980. In 1982, he was promoted to director of political department of army division. He became a vice political commissar of army corps in 1983, and political commissar of army corps in 1985. In January 1992, he was elevated to the director of political department of Guangzhou Military Region. In December 1994, he was transferred to Nanjing Military Region and became vice political commissar, secretary of commission for discipline inspection, and a CPC standing committee member of that MR. He was promoted to political commissar of Nanjing Military Region in December 2000. In March 2008, he was appointed as vice director of ethnicity committee of National People's Congress.

He attained the rank of major general in September 1988, lieutenant general in July 1994, and a general in 2004.

He was a member of 13th, 14th, 15th and 16th Central Committees of Chinese Communist Party, and a standing committee member of the 11th National People's Congress.

Military offices
Preceded by Fang Zuqi	Director of the Political Department of the Guangzhou Military Region; 1992–1994	Succeeded by Zhang Guochu
Preceded by Fang Zuqi	Political Commissar of the Nanjing Military Region; 2000–2007	Succeeded by Chen Guoling
