= Huaiyin =

Huaiyin may refer to:

- Huai'an (淮阴), named Huaiyin before 2001, a prefecture-level city in Jiangsu, People's Republic of China
- Huaiyin District, Huai'an (淮阴区), Jiangsu, People's Republic of China
- Huaiyin District, Jinan (槐荫区), Shandong, People's Republic of China
- Chinese frigate Huaiyin (513), 1977-2013
