= Yang Cheng (general) =

Chinese general (born 1964)

- 杨诚

Political Commissar of the Xinjiang Military District
- In office December 2020 – October 2026
- Preceded by: Li Wei

Personal details
- Born: December 1964 (age 61) Shaoyang, Hunan, China
- Party: Chinese Communist Party (expelled in 2026)

Military service
- Allegiance: People's Republic of China
- Branch/service: People's Liberation Army Ground Force
- Years of service: ?–present
- Rank: Lieutenant general

Chinese name
- Simplified Chinese: 杨诚
- Traditional Chinese: 楊誠
Transcriptions
Standard Mandarin
- Hanyu Pinyin: Yáng Chéng

Yang Cheng (Chinese: 杨诚; born December 1964) is a lieutenant general (zhongjiang) of the People's Liberation Army (PLA) who served as political commissar of the Xinjiang Military District, succeeding Li Wei in December 2020. He is a delegate to the 13th National People's Congress. In October 2026, Yang was expelled from the Chinese Communist Party.

== Biography ==
Yang was born in Shaoyang, Hunan, in December 1964. He served in Lanzhou Military Region before being appointed political commissar of the Ngari Prefecture Military District. In March 2014, he was made deputy political commissar of the Joint Logistics Department of Lanzhou Military Region, a position he held until March 2015, when he was appointed deputy political commissar of the 21st Group Army. In March 2017, he rose to become political commissar of the newly founded 73rd Group Army. In July 2020, he was given the position of deputy political commissar of the People's Armed Police, but having held the position for only four months, and was reassigned as political commissar of the Xinjiang Military District. In June 2021, he was admitted to member of the standing committee of the Chinese Communist Party's Xinjiang Regional Committee, the region's top authority.

He was promoted to the rank of major general (Shaojiang) in July 2015 and lieutenant general (zhongjiang) in July 2020.

On 29 October 2026, the fifth plenary session of the 20th CCP Central Committee reviewed and approved the report of the Discipline Inspection Commission of the Central Military Commission on the "serious violations of discipline and law" by Yang and confirmed the Politburo decision to expel him from the CCP.

Military offices
New title	Political Commissar of the newly founded 73rd Group Army; 2017–2020	Succeeded by Fang Ming (方明)
Preceded by Li Wei	Political Commissar of the Xinjiang Military District; 2020–2026	Incumbent
