= Xiao (rank) =

Military rank in China and Taiwan

Chinese name
- Traditional Chinese: 校
- Simplified Chinese: 校
Transcriptions
Standard Mandarin
- Hanyu Pinyin: jiào
- Wade–Giles: chiao

Xiao is a senior officer rank used in the militaries of China and Taiwan.

The Chinese use the same rank names for all services, prefixed by haijun (simplified Chinese: 海军; traditional Chinese: 海軍; lit. 'naval force') or kongjun (simplified Chinese: 空军; traditional Chinese: 空軍; lit. 'air force').

== Usage ==
=== People's Republic of China ===
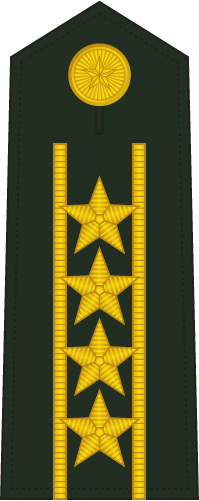
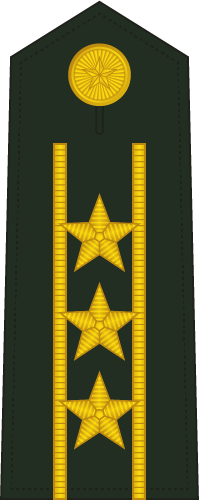
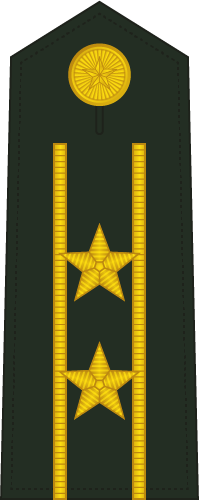
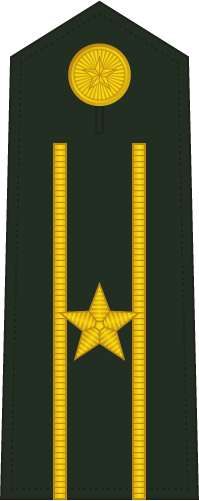
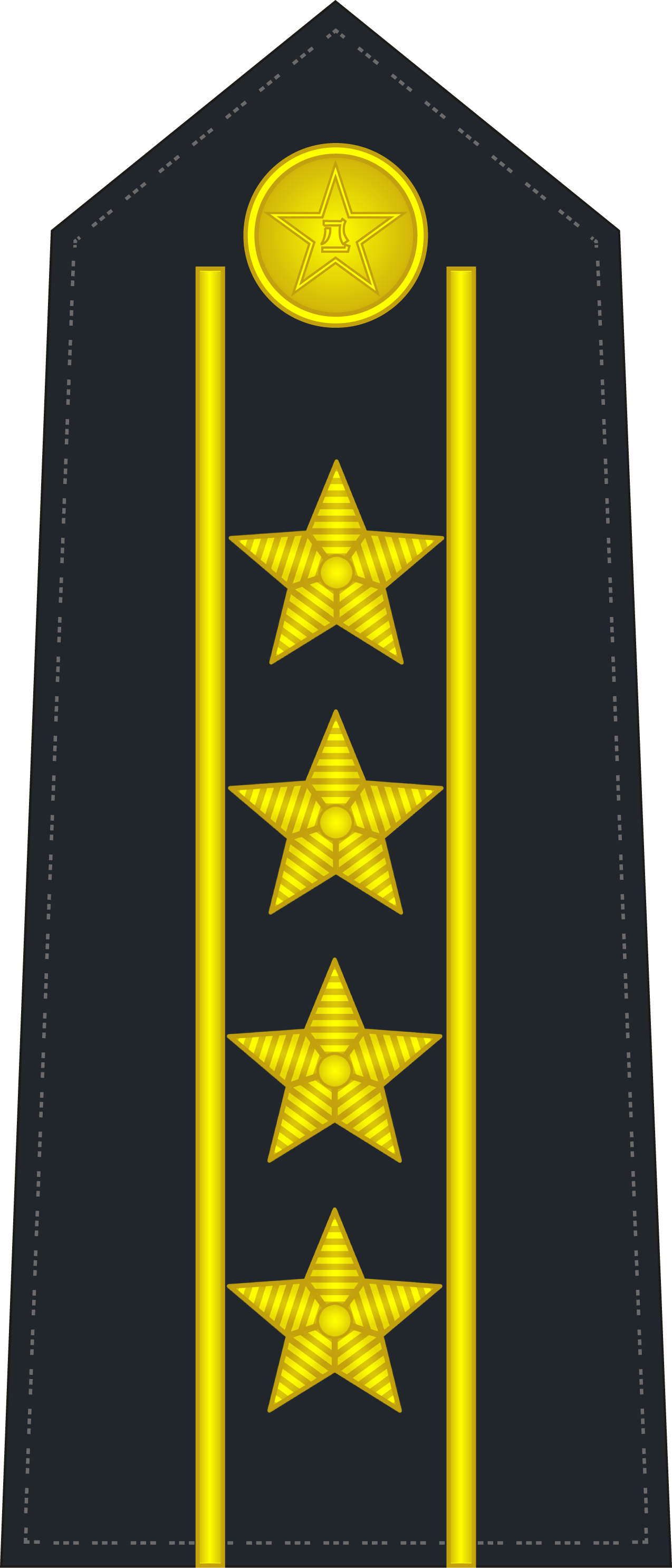
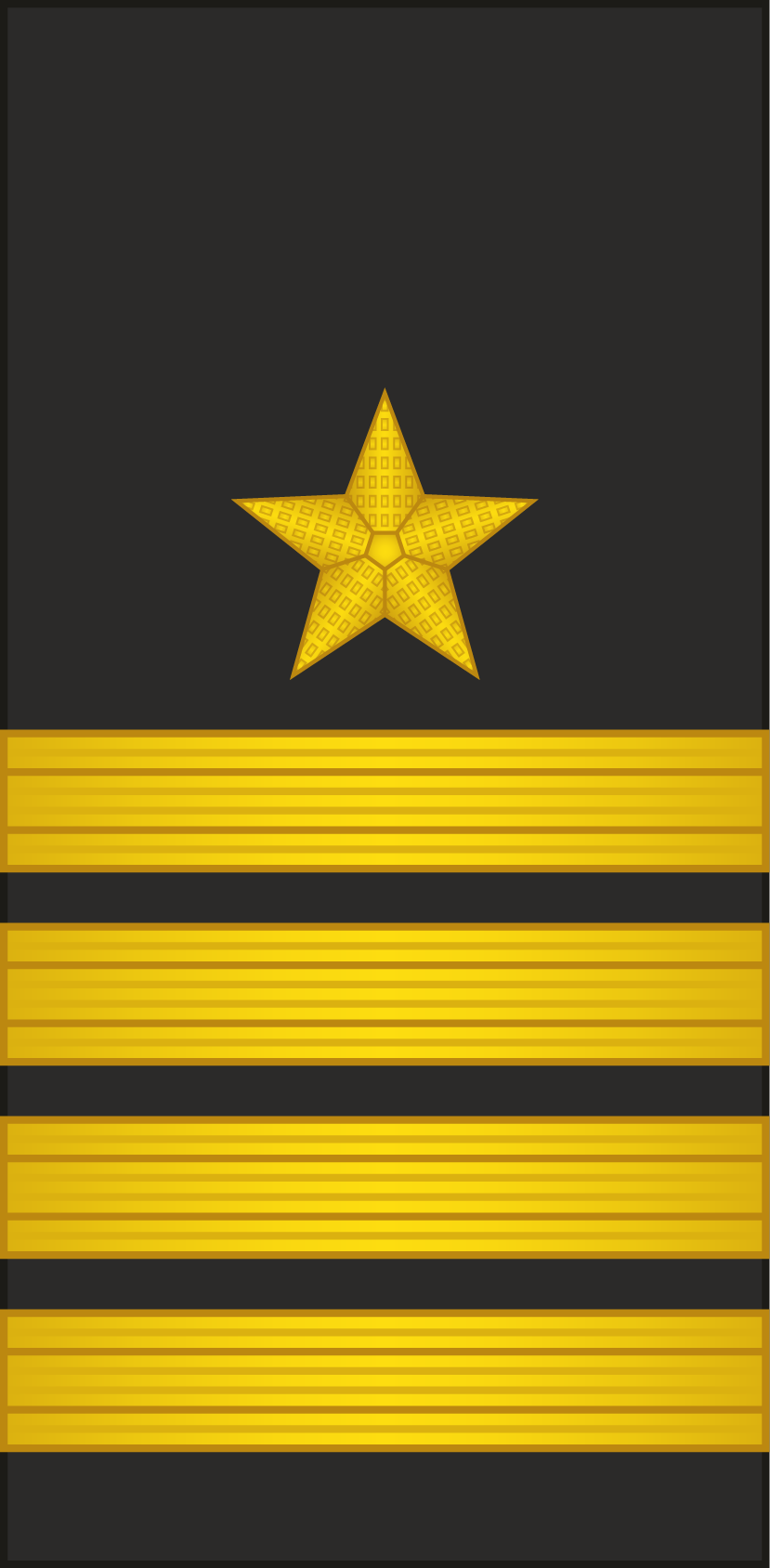
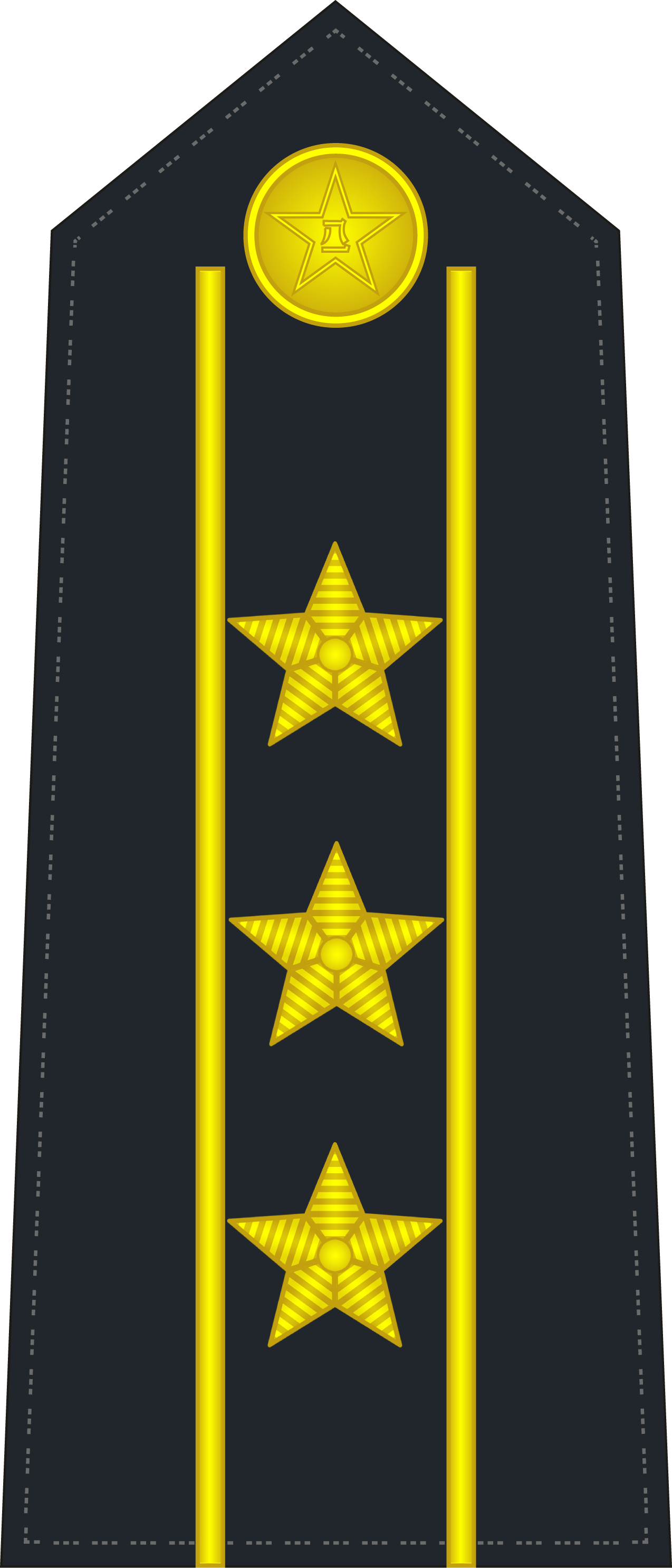
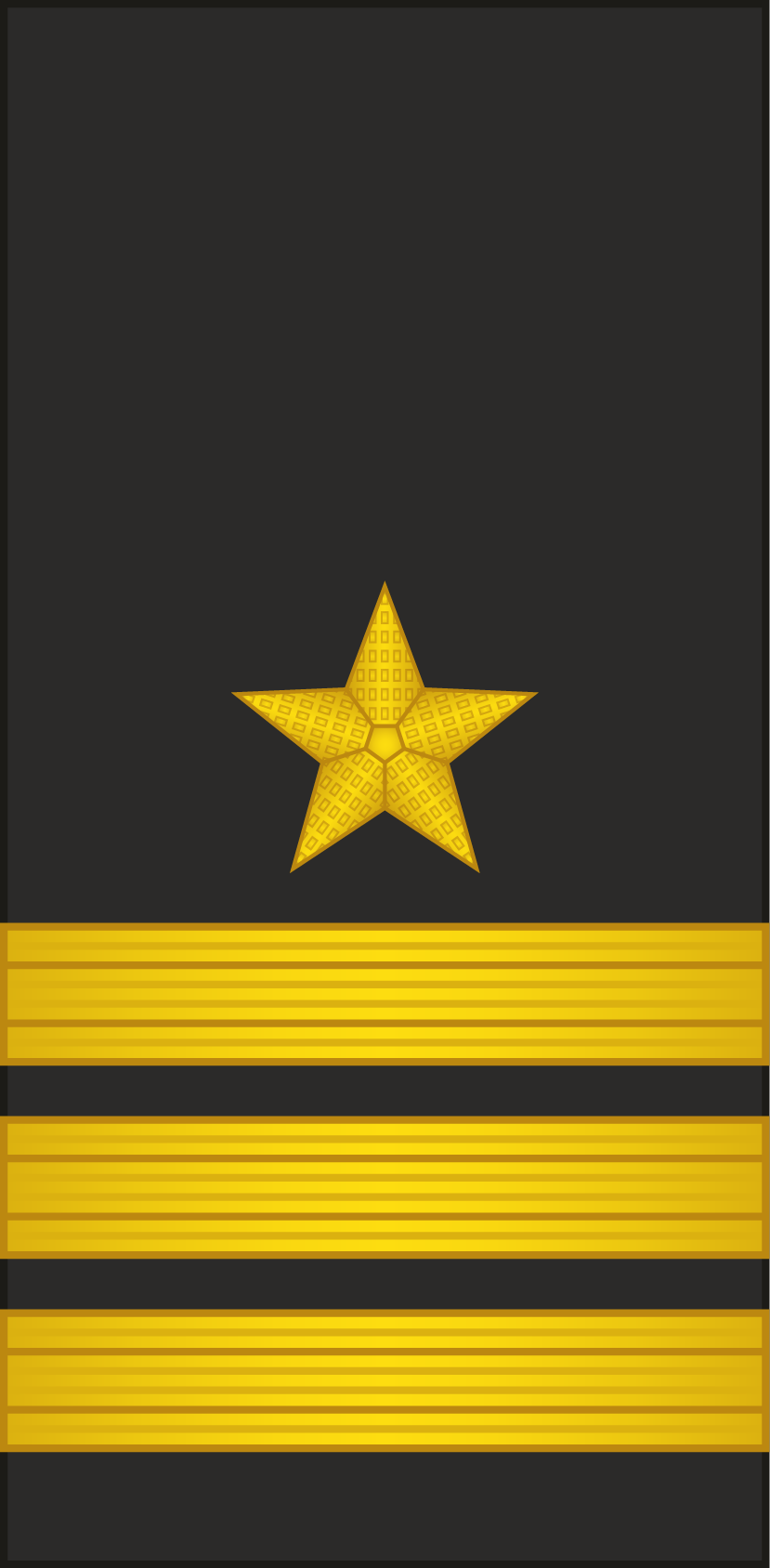
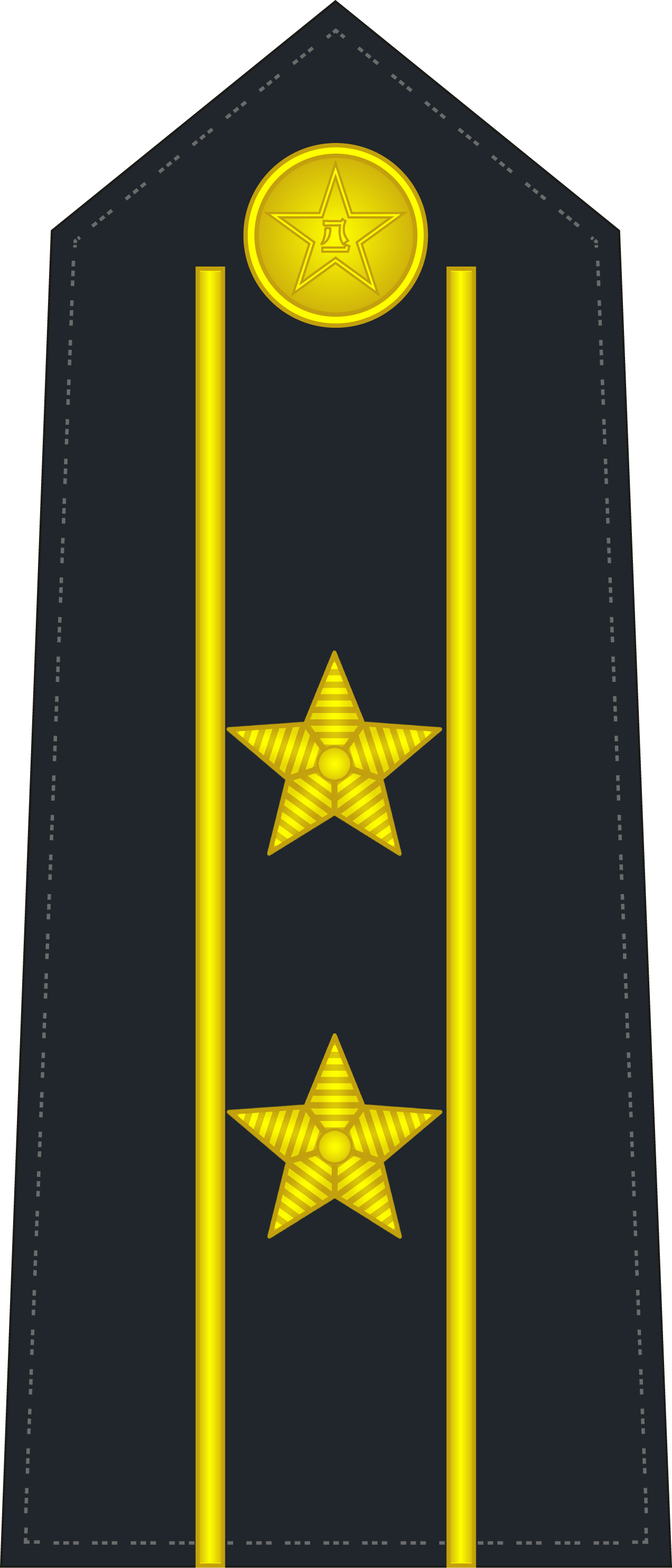
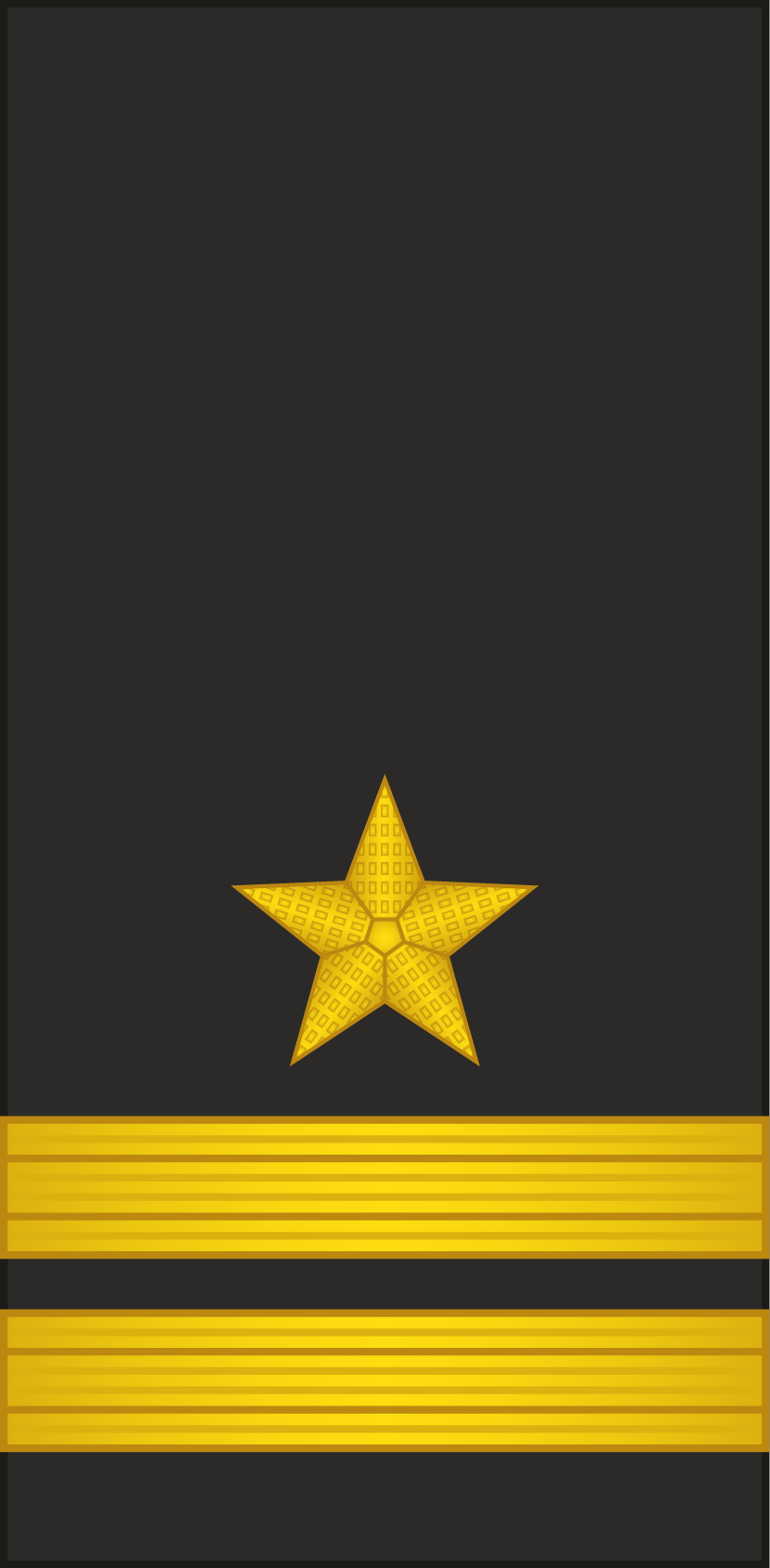
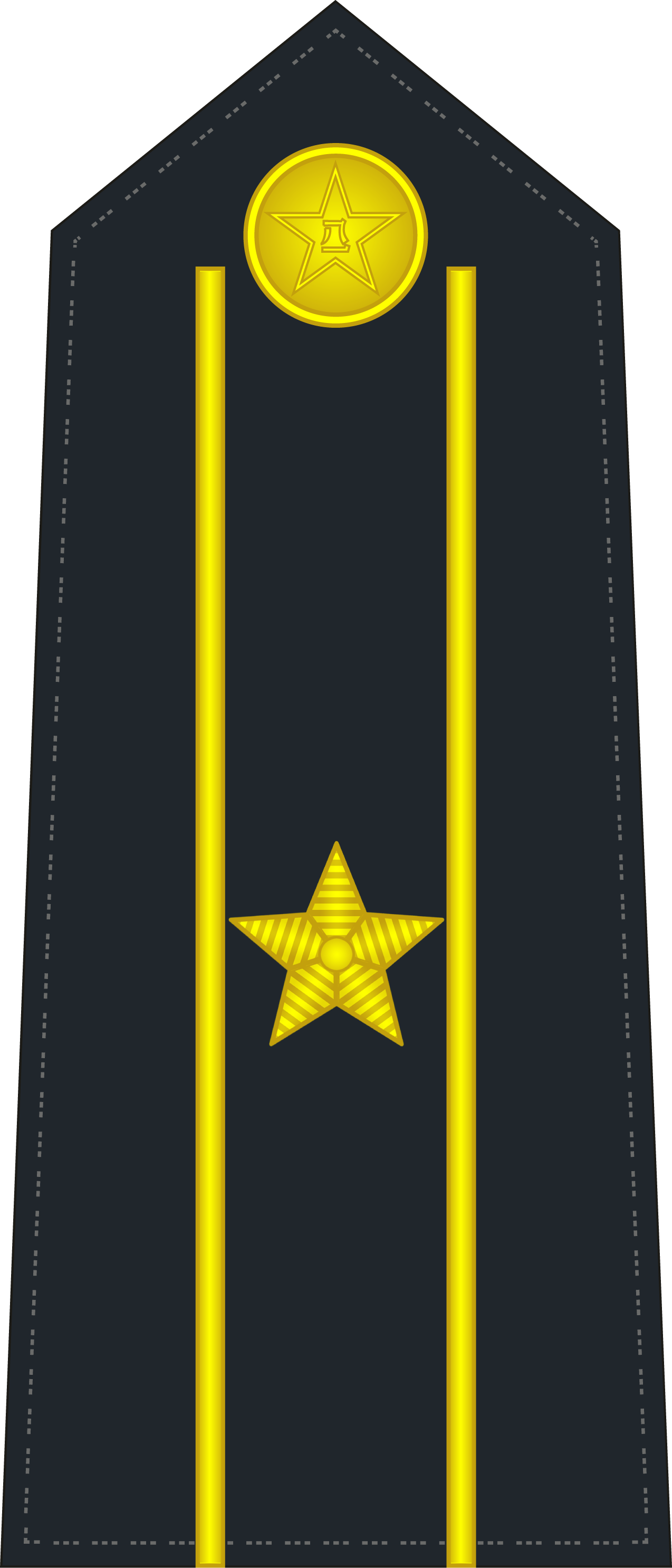
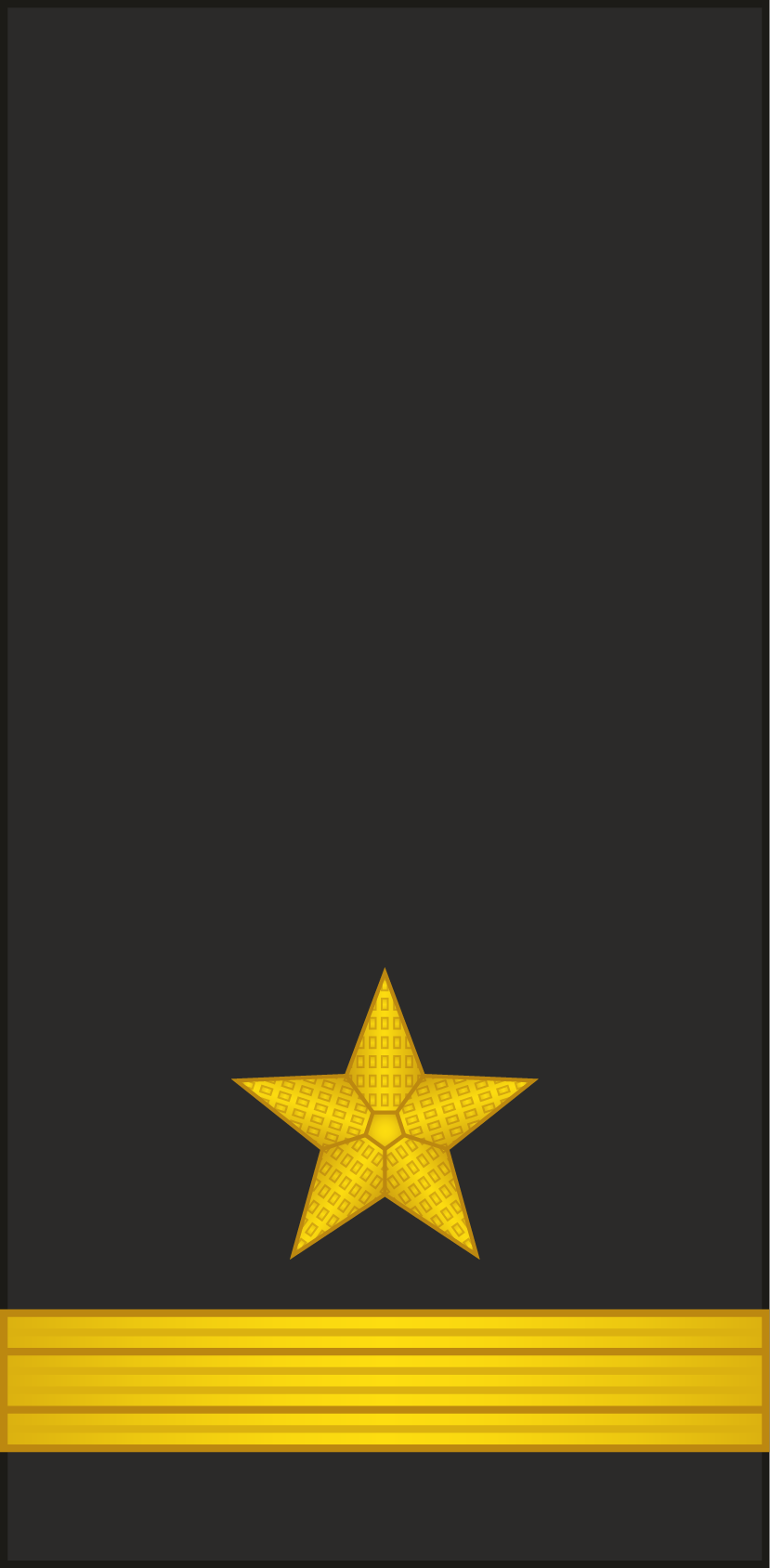
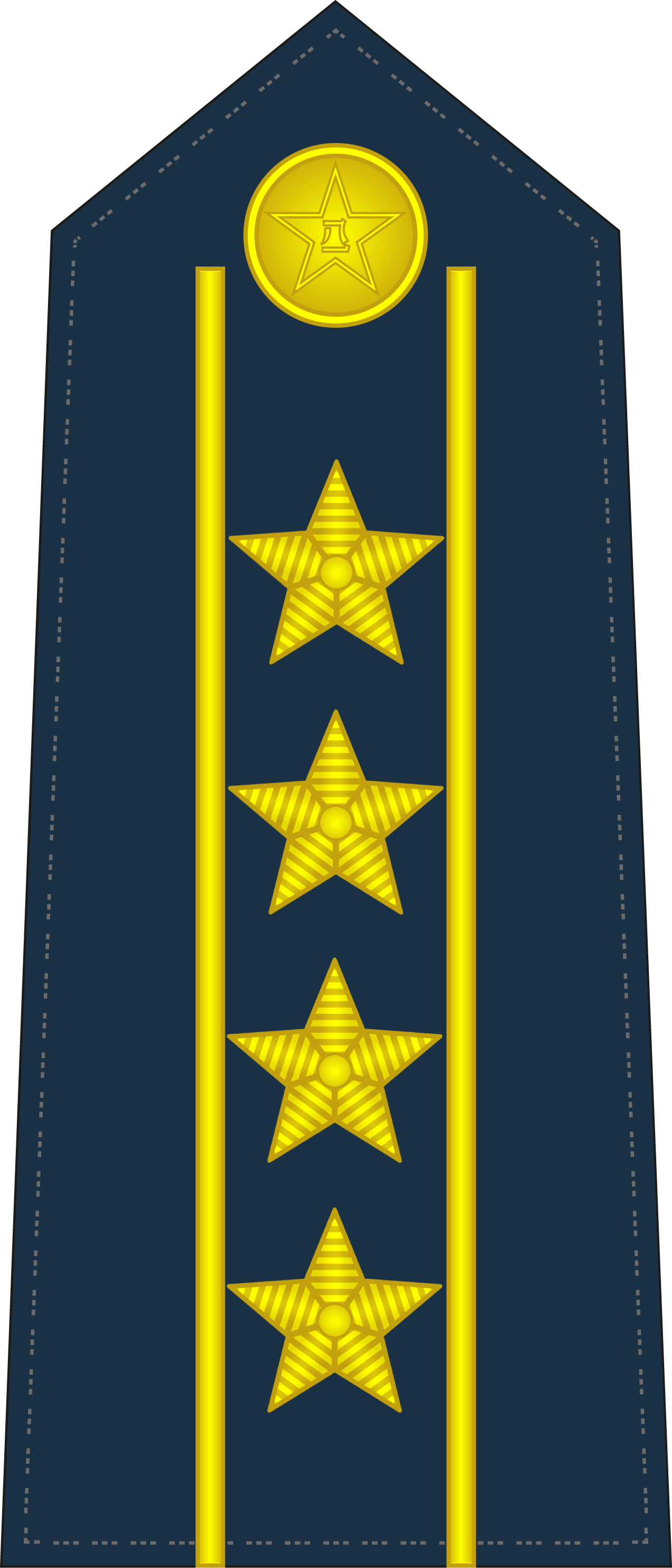
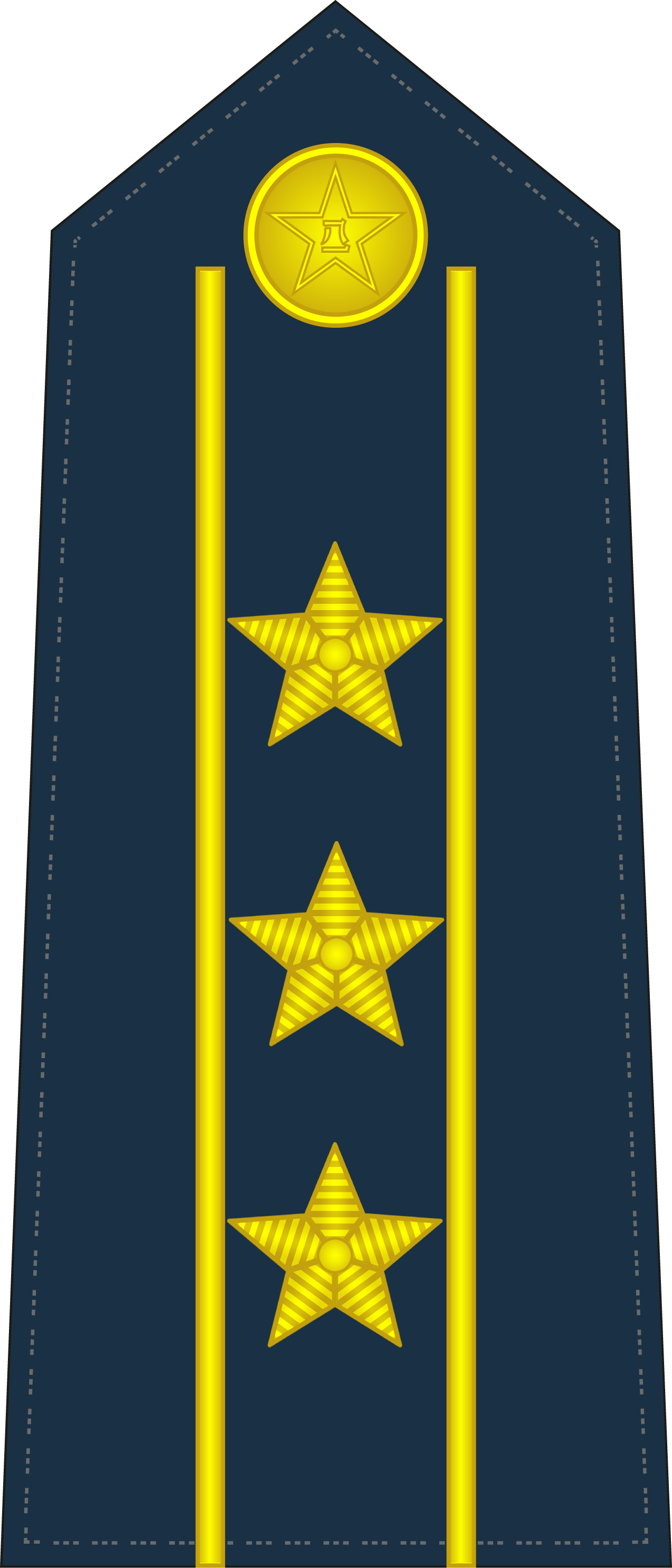
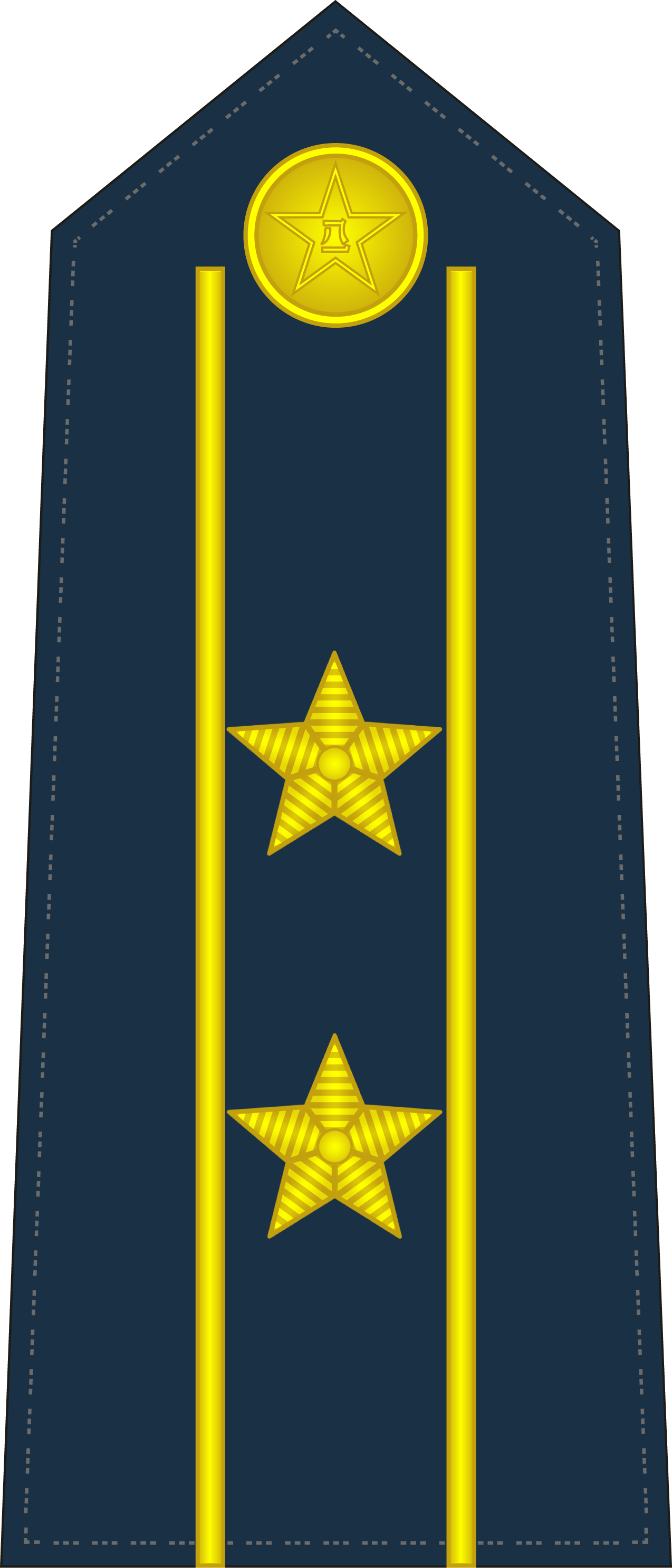
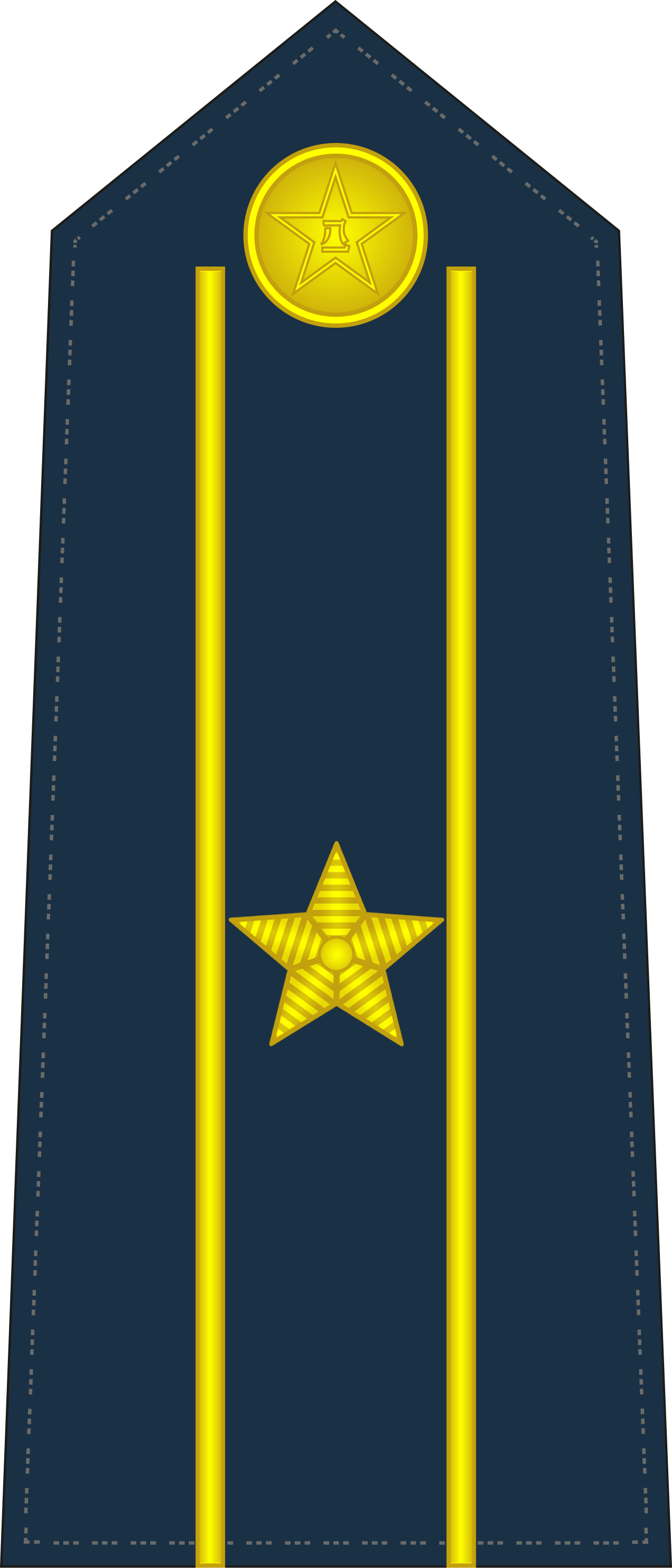
Rank group	Senior officers
Chinese	大校	上校	中校	少校
Pinyin	Dàxiào	Shàngxiào	Zhōngxiào	Shàoxiào
Literal translation	Grand field officer	Senior field officer	Middle field officer	Junior field officer
PLA Ground Forces (Note: Same insignia for the Armed Police, Rocket Force, Aerospace Force, and Cyberspace Force.)
PLA Navy
PLA Air Force
Army and air force translation	Senior colonel	Colonel	Lieutenant colonel	Major
Navy translation	Senior captain	Captain	Commander	Lieutenant commander
Chinese title	大校; Dàxiào	上校; Shàngxiào	中校; Zhōngxiào	少校; Shàoxiào
Rank group	Senior officers

=== Republic of China ===
Rank group	Senior officers
Chinese	上校	中校	少校
Taiwanese Hokkien	Siōng-hāu	Tiong-hāu	Siáu-hāu
Literal translation	Senior field officer	Middle field officer	Junior field officer
Republic of China Army
ROC Military Police
Republic of China Navy
Republic of China Air Force
Republic of China Marine Corps
Army and air force translation	Colonel	Lieutenant colonel	Major
Navy translation	Captain	Commander	Lieutenant commander
Chinese title	上校; Siōng-hāu	中校; Tiong-hāu	少校; Siáu-hāu
Rank group	Senior officers

== See also ==
Ranks used in Chinese character-using countries

- General officer: Jiang (rank)
- Senior officer: Sa (rank), Xiao (rank), Lyeong
- Junior officer: Wei (rank)
- Non-commissioned officers: Shi (rank)
- Enlisted ranks: Bing (rank), Shi (rank)
