= People's Liberation Army Information Support Force =

Information support arm of the People's Liberation Army

- 中国人民解放军信息支援部队
- Founded: 19 April 2024; 22 months ago
- Country: China
- Allegiance: Chinese Communist Party
- Type: Command and control support
- Role: Providing support for coordinating the construction and application of network information systems
- Part of: People's Liberation Army

Commanders
- Commander: Lieutenant General Bi Yi
- Political Commissar: General Li Wei

Insignia
- Symbol

- Flag

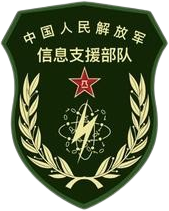
- Sleeve badge

The People's Liberation Army Information Support Force (ISF) is an arm of the People's Liberation Army. It provides support for coordinating the construction and application of network information systems. It was established on 19 April 2024.

== History ==
The Information Support Force was established on 19 April 2024, together with the disestablishment of the Strategic Support Force.

The new arm replaced the information support function of the previous Strategic Support Force, servicing the mission of coordinating the construction and application of network information systems within the People's Liberation Army, a critical part of multi-domain joint operations for military operation. The establishment of an independent arm for information support enabled institutionalization for the PLA doctrine.

== Structure ==
The Information Support Force is established as the deputy-theatre-command leader grade, the same as the Aerospace Support Force and Cyberspace Support Force. All three arms are positioned below both the regular service branches and the theater commands in the PLA hierarchy.

== Personnel ==
=== Commander ===
- Bi Yi (April 2024 – present)

=== Political Commissar ===
- Li Wei (April 2024 – present)

== See also ==
- Chinese information operations and information warfare
- Three warfares
