= People's Liberation Army Strategic Support Force =

Former cyber and space force of the People's Liberation Army (2015–2024)

- 中国人民解放军战略支援部队
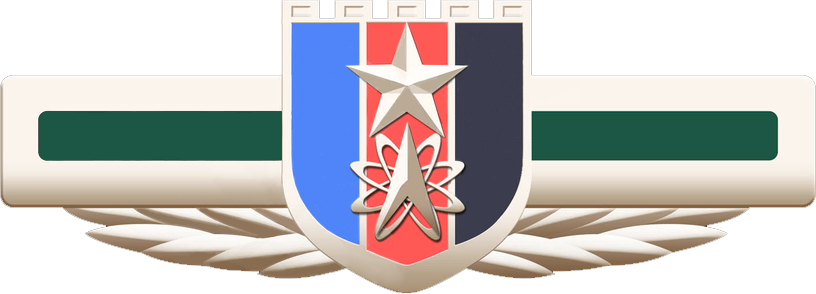
- Emblem of the People's Liberation Army; Strategic Support Force
- Founded: 31 December 2015; 10 years ago
- Disbanded: 19 April 2024; 2 years ago
- Country: China
- Allegiance: Chinese Communist Party
- Type: Space force; Cyber force
- Role: Space warfare; Cyber warfare; Electronic warfare; Psychological warfare
- Part of: People's Liberation Army
- March: 《我们是刀尖，我们是铁拳》 ("We Are the Knife Point, We Are the Iron Fist")
- Website: chinamil.com.cn

Insignia
- Badge: The emblem of PLASSF

- Sleeve insignia

The People's Liberation Army Strategic Support Force was a service branch of the People's Liberation Army that existed from December 2015 to April 2024.

With an aim to improve the army's ability to fight what China terms "informationized conflicts" (Note: Chinese: 信息化战争; pinyin: xìnxīhuà zhànzhēng) and enhance the PLA's power projection capabilities in space and cyberspace, the PLASSF was a force purportedly designed to break stovepipes in the intelligence sharing and coordination departments of the different branches.

On 19 April 2024, the Strategic Support Force was dissolved and split into three independent arms: the People's Liberation Army Aerospace Force, the People's Liberation Army Cyberspace Force and the People's Liberation Army Information Support Force.

== History ==
At the 2015 China Victory Day Parade, the Chinese Communist Party (CCP) general secretary, President of China and Central Military Commission (CMC) chairman Xi Jinping announced sweeping reforms to the structure of the Chinese People's Liberation Army (PLA) and the state security apparatus. On 22 December 2015, the Chinese PLA newsletter, Liberation Army Daily, reported that as part of the joint military exercises taking place that same year, strategic and logistical support forces were included in those exercises along with Intelligence and other high-profile units among the Central Military Commission.

On 31 December 2015, the PLA Strategic Support Force held its first annual meeting at the Bayi Building in Beijing. In attendance were the CMC leadership and leaders of the PLA Ground Force and Rocket Force. CMC Chairman Xi Jinping was also in attendance, giving out military flags and instructional speeches, along with CMC Vice Chairmen and CCP Political Department members Fan Changlong and Xu Qiliang. Fan Changlong read out the CMC's orders and decisions issued by Chairman Xi on the formation of the PLA's leadership and forces, while Vice Chairman Xu Qiliang presided over the meeting.

On 1 January 2016, the next day, Yang Yujun of the Chinese Ministry of National Defense issued a statement on the new Strategic Support Force describing it as formed by the "functional integration" of various support forces that are strategic, basic, and supportive. Another expert, Rear Admiral Yin Zhuo of the PLA Navy, noted:

The major mission of the PLA Strategic Support Force is to give support to the combat operations so that the PLA can gain regional advantages in the space warfare and cyber warfare domains, and to ensure smooth operations.

Specifically, the objectives of the strategic support force were to include:

- target acquisition
- reconnaissance
- undertaking daily navigation operations, space reconnaissance, and management of Beidou satellites
- undertaking electronic and cyber warfare and countermeasures

Unlike the PLA Rocket Force, the Strategic Support Force is more dedicated to 5th Generation Information Warfare and is structured to engage in the information space, with emphasis on electronic countermeasures, network offense and defense, satellite management, and some of the functions of logistical supply and dispatch. It also responsible for influence operations, cyberwarfare, and electronic warfare.

On 24 July 2019, the government white paper "China's National Defense in a New Era" published by the State Council Information Office stated:

The strategic support force is a new type of combat force to maintain national security and an important growth point for new combat capabilities, including battlefield environment protection, Information Assurance and Communication Security, Information Security, testing and integrating emerging technologies, among other things.

On 19 April 2024, the Strategic Support Force was dissolved in a reorganization. Its functions were redistributed to the PLA Cyberspace Force, the PLA Aerospace Force, and the PLA Information Support Force.

== Organizational structure ==
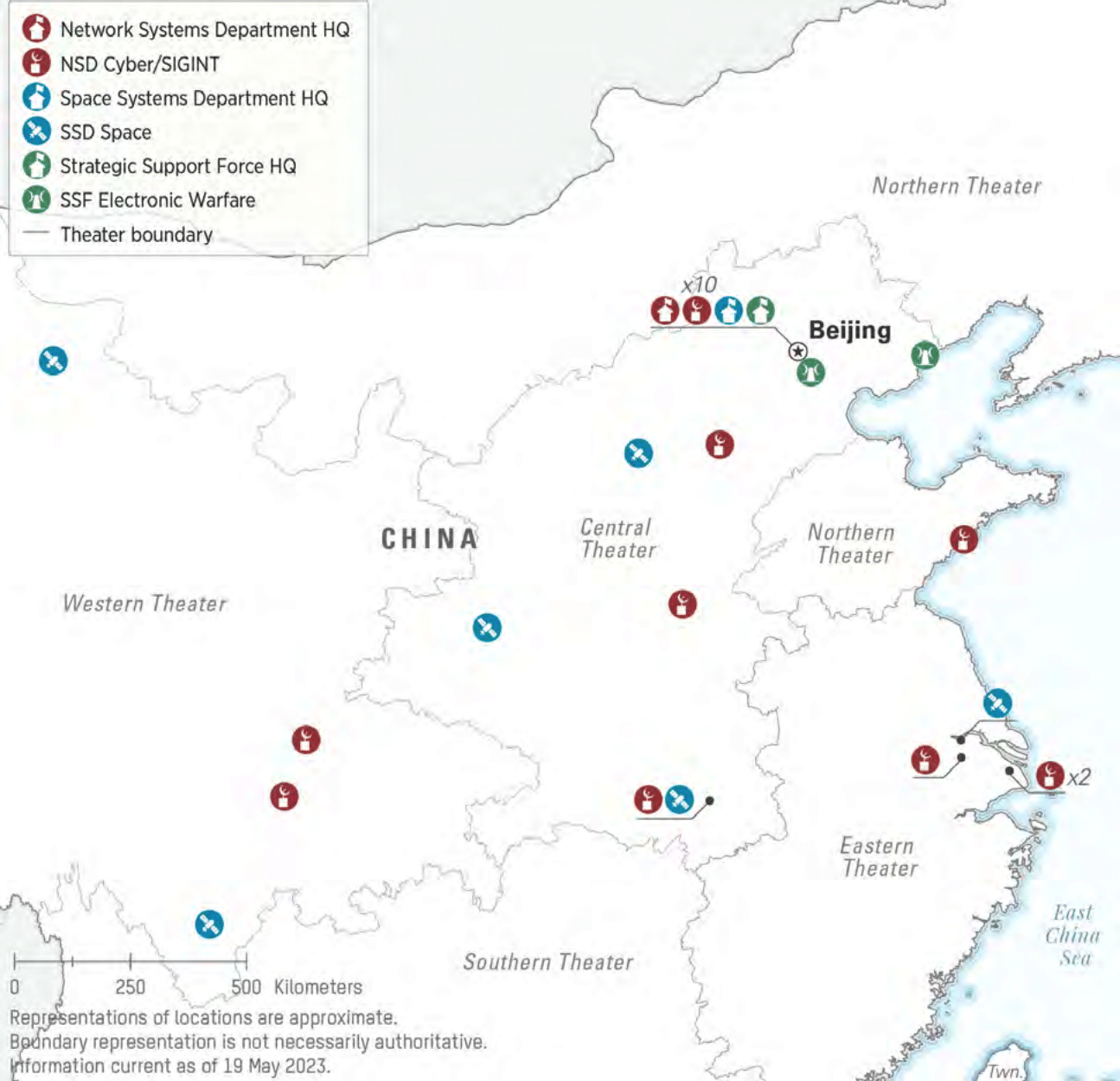
Installations of the SSF

The PLASSF leadership and administrative officials were stationed at their headquarters in the Haidian District of Beijing; the functional departments and leadership of the subordinate units were stationed here. The PLASSF oversaw all units responsible for psychological warfare, information warfare, space warfare, cyberwarfare, and electronic warfare operations formerly under the former General Staff Department.

This included the cyber espionage capabilities of the former Third Department, the electronic support measures from the former Fourth Department, and the space-based ISR systems and Aerospace Reconnaissance Bureau and Satellite Main Station, General Political Department, and General Armaments Department, including the launch, telemetry, tracking, and control facilities and research and development organizations.

=== Functional departments ===
==== General Staff Department ====
The General Staff Department was under the direction of General Li Shangfu, Chief of Staff. His Deputy Chiefs of Staff were Major General Sun Bo and Major General Zhang Minghua. Subordinated to the General Staff Department was the PLASSF Xingcheng "Rehabilitation" Center.

==== Political Work Department ====
The Political Work Department was under the direction of Lieutenant General Feng Jianhua. His Deputy Directors were Major General Chen Jinrong and Major General Huang Qiusheng. Subordinated to the Political Department was the Political Bureau.

==== Disciplinary Inspection Commission ====
Also called the PLASSF Supervisory Commission, the Disciplinary Inspection Commission was led by Lieutenant General Yang Xiaoxiang, Secretary. The role of the Disciplinary Inspection Commission was to conduct surveillance and conduct "disciplinary inspections" on PLASSF members in accordance with Article 68 of the March 2018 "Supervision Law" passed by the 13th National People's Congress. The position of Secretary was originally held by Deputy Political Commissar Lu Jiancheng (2016–2019). Subordinated to the Disciplinary Inspection Commission was the Disciplinary Inspection Service.

==== Space Systems Department ====
After 2015, military units with space missions were transferred to the Space Systems Department. These included space functions like launch centers, satellite control centers, ground tracking stations, mapping and survey units, and former General Armaments Department and General Staff Department research institutes. In 2017, the Equipment and Command Technology Institute was expanded into PLASSF's Space Engineering University.

On 19 April 2024, the Space Systems Department was reorganised as the independent People's Liberation Army Aerospace Force.

==== Network Systems Department ====
The PLASSF combined PLA cyber units from various PLA bodies into the Network Systems Department which included cyber intelligence, defense, and attack capabilities, including those previously belonging to the Third and Fourth Departments of the PLA. As of 2018 it was headed by Lieutenant General Zheng Junjie, with Lieutenant General Chai Shaoling as political commissar, both of whom were also serving members of the 13th National People's Congress.

- Unit 61398 (中國人民解放軍61398部隊) / "APT 1": Stationed in the Pudong District of Shanghai, Unit 61398 is rumored to be a secret military hacker unit within the Second Bureau of the CMC Political Department. Though it is recognized by the U.S. Government, its existence has been repeatedly denied by the Chinese Government.
- Unit 61486 (中國人民解放軍61486部隊) / "Putter Panda": Unit 61486 was the designation for the Twelfth Bureau of the CMC Political Department that was caught committing cyber espionage on American, European, and Japanese aerospace companies with the intention to steal secrets.
- Unit 61726 (中國人民解放軍61726部隊) / "Sixth Bureau" (中國人民解放軍總參謀部第三部第六局的代號): Stationed in the Wuchang District of Wuhan in the Hubei Province, is a "hacker" force dedicated to cyberwarfare specifically targeting Taiwan. They are directly subordinate to both the sixth bureau of the CMC Political Work Department and the SSF Network Systems Department. They originated as Unit 57316 stationed in Jingmen before transferring their headquarters to Wuhan sometime in the early 2000s. The Sixth Bureau has offices all over Central China, including: Xiamen City in Fujian Province, Ziling Village of Jingmen City and Xiangyang City in Hubei Province, Nanchang City and the Xiaobu Township in Ningdu County of Ganzhou in Jiangxi Province, and Panlong District of Kunming City in Yunnan Province. It is suspected that the Nanchang detachment is a training detachment. The sixth bureau is also suspected to be embedded in the National Cyber Security College of Wuhan University and its associated research centers and laboratories.
- Unit 61786 (中国人民解放军61786部队) / "Eighth Bureau" (八局): Stationed at the foot of the Yan Mountain range, this is an information technology research institute responsible for intercepting communications from Russia and Central Asia. In 2011, it was commended as the most talented development unit in the PLA.
- NSD 56th Research Institute (第56研究所) / Jiangnan Institute of Computing Technology (江南计算技术研究所): Stationed in Wuxi City in the Jiangsu Province. Founded in June 1951, it was the first computer science and engineering research institute for the PLA. They also conduct research on network systems and communications, information assurance and cybersecurity. This is the home to China's first supercomputer, its first GHz computer, and its first 100 GHz computer. By the 2010s, the institute became the computing powerhouse of the PLA, with automated PCB production lines, CAD software development, a research library and full scale living facilities. As of 2016 the institute employs more than 200 Senior Engineers along with graduate and doctoral students from all over China.
- NSD 58th Research Institute (中国人民解放军战略支援部队第五十八研究所) - stationed in Beijing.
- PLA 316th Hospital (中国人民解放军第三一六医院) - stationed in Beijing.

List of military bases under the NSD:

- Notional Base 31, Nanjing
- Notional Base 32, Guangzhou
- Notional Base 33, Chengdu
- Notional Base 34, Shenyang
- Notional Base 36, Beijing
- Notional Base 38, Kaifeng

On 19 April 2024, the Network Systems Department was reorganised as the independent People's Liberation Army Information Support Force.

=== Directly subordinate units ===
- SSF Electronic Countermeasures Brigade (电子对抗旅)Little is known about this unit.
- PLA Strategic Support Force Special Medical Center (中国人民解放军战略支援部队特色医学中心)

Stationed at No. 9 Anxiang Beili, Deshengmen Wai, Chaoyang District of Beijing, it was founded in 1971 as the 514th Hospital of the Commission of Science, Technology and Industry for National Defense. In 1997, it became the General Hospital of the Commission of Science, Technology and Industry for National Defense. In March 1999, it was redesignated as the 306th PLA Hospital. After the 2015 reforms, the Strategic Support Force assumed authority over this hospital. The hospital Dean is Major General Gu Jianwen and its Political Commissar is Major General Zhang Yucai.

- Unit 61716 - People's Liberation Army Base 311 (中国人民解放军三一一基地)Stationed at No. 15 Yuandang Street, Baima North Road in the Gulou District of Fuzhou in the Fujian Province, the Trinity Base was founded in 2005 under the control of the PLA Political Department to conduct "three warfares" operations against Taiwan. The "three warfares" are "Public Opinion Warfare, Psychological Warfare, and Legal Warfare." In 2011, the base was designated as the focal point of all psychological warfare efforts against Taiwan, including assisting in broadcasting propaganda programs thru the Chinese radio stations like Huayi Broadcasting (中国华艺广播公司) and Voice of the Strait. The base itself is also on social media. In 2016, PLASSF assumed control of the base. The base is under the direction of Political Commissar, Major General Mei Huabo.

==== PLASSF universities ====
- PLASSF Aerospace Engineering University: Located in Beijing, under the leadership and management of the Space Systems Department, the university was founded in June 1978 as a "Cadre School" under the National Defense Science and Technology Commission. In 1982, the Commission of Science, Technology and Industry for National Defense assumed authority over the school, and, in 1986, upgraded the school to Command and Technology College. In 1999, the PLA General Armaments department assumed authority and renamed the school to Chinese PLA Equipment Command and Technology Academy. It remained this way until 2011, when the name was shortened to Equipment Academy of the Chinese People's Liberation Army. In 2016, as part of the military reforms, the academy was transferred to the Training Management Division of the Central Military Commission, where it was rebuilt into the Aerospace Engineering University under the Strategic Support Force. Today, the university has more than 20 undergraduate majors, 12 graduate programs, 5 doctoral programs, and 3 post-doctoral research stations. The Dean is Major General Zhou Zhixin and the Political Commissar is Major General Ji Duo.
- PLASSF Information Engineering University: Located in the cities of Zhengzhou and Luoyang in Henan Province, under the leadership and management of the Network Systems Department, the school was founded in October 1971 by the 5th Radio Engineering Brigade of the PLA 1st Foreign Language School into the Chinese PLA Institute of Engineering and Technology in Zhangzhou. In January 1981, the Chinese PLA Luoyang University of Foreign Languages Department of Applied Mathematics and Department of Information Processing were transferred to the Institute of Engineering and Technology. In July 1986, the name was change to the Chinese PLA Information Engineering Institute. In June 1991, CPC General Secretary Jiang Zemin wrote the following inscription for the school: "Promote the school spirit of strict diligence, unity and dedication, and establish a distinctive and high-level key science and engineering military academy." In 1995, it was identified by the Central Military Commission as one of the 17 key construction academies of the PLA. The following institutes are subordinate to IEU:
  - S&T Research Department (科研部)
  - Training Department (训练部)
  - Command Information Systems Academy (指挥信息系统学院)
  - Electronic Technology Academy (电子技术学院)
  - Encryption Engineering Academy (密码工程学院)
  - Foreign Language Academy (外国语学院) in Luoyang
  - Geospatial Information Academy (地理空间信息学院)
  - Cyberspace Security Academy (网络空间安全学院)
  - Navigation and Aerospace Target Engineering Academy (导航与空天目标工程学院)
  - Command Officer Basic Education Academy (指挥军官基础教育学院)
  - Blockchain Academy (区块链研究院; located in Shenzhen)

As for the Beijing Aerospace Flight Control Center, they are tasked with conducting launch monitoring, tracking and measurement, as well as launch recovery.

===== Unit 63790 - 27th Experimental Training Base / Xichang Satellite Launch Center =====
Headquartered on the Hangtian North Road of Xichang City in the Sichuan Province. It is also home to the Wenchang Aerospace Launch Site.

===== Unit 63880 - 33rd Experimental Training Base / Luoyang Electronic Equipment Test Center =====
Stationed at Luoyang in the Henan Province, Base 33 serves as the metrology and instrument measurement center. They also conduct Astronomical mapping and surveying. This base is the most restricted bases in China and was off limits to foreigners until the 1980s during the decommission of various military installations. However, it is still in use and under the control of the CMC Equipment Development Department.

- China Aerodynamics Research and Development Center (29th Testing and Training Base)
- Space Telemetry, Tracking, and Control
- Beijing Aerospace Flight Control Center
- Telemetry, Tracking, and Control Stations
- Aerospace Reconnaissance Bureau
- Satellite Main Station
- Aerospace Research and Development Center
- Project Design Research Center
- Astronaut Corps

== Ranks ==
=== Officers ===
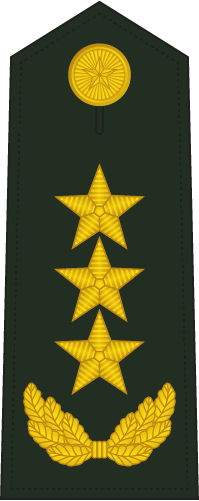
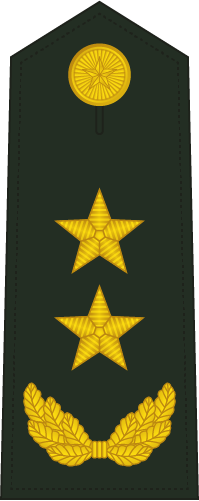
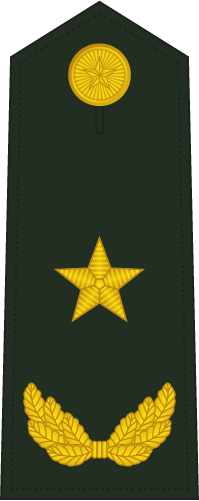
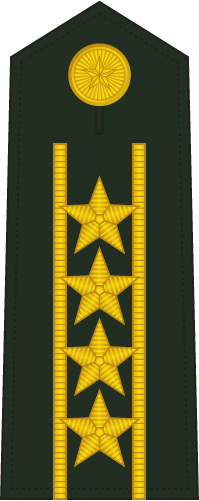
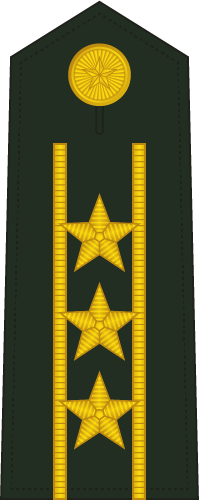
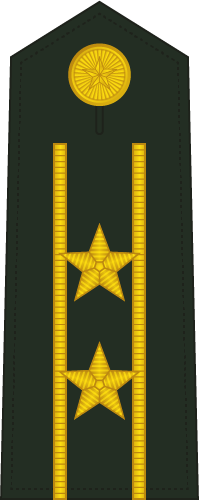
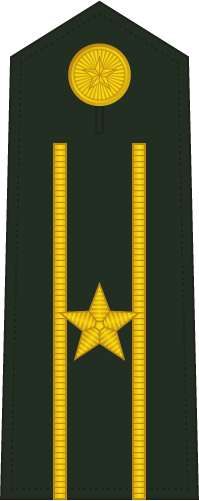
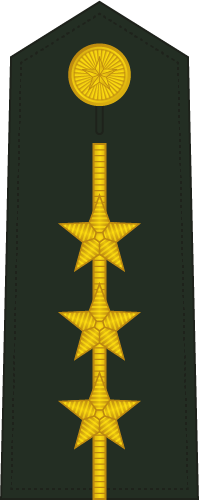
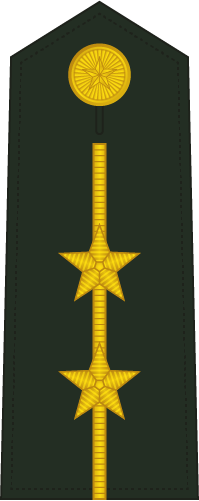
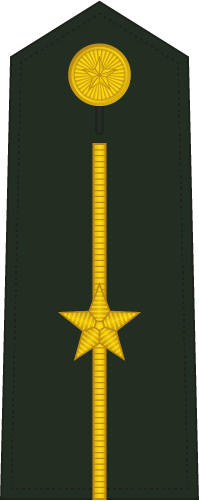
| Rank group | General/Flag/Air officers | | | Senior officers | | | | Junior officers |
|---|---|---|---|---|---|---|---|---|---|---|
| (China) PLA Strategic Support Force |
| (China) PLA Strategic Support Force | 上将; Shàngjiàng | 中将; Zhōngjiàng | 少将; Shàojiàng | 大校; Dàxiào | 上校; Shàngxiào | 中校; Zhōngxiào | 少校; Shàoxiào | 上尉; Shàngwèi | 中尉; Zhōngwèi | 少尉; Shàowèi |

=== Enlisted ===
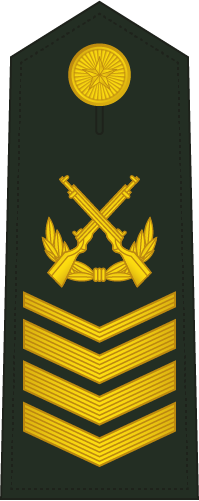
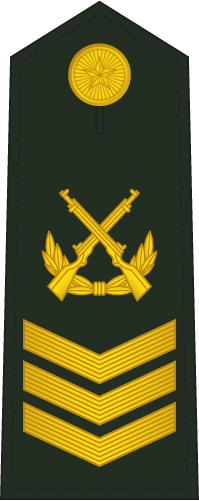
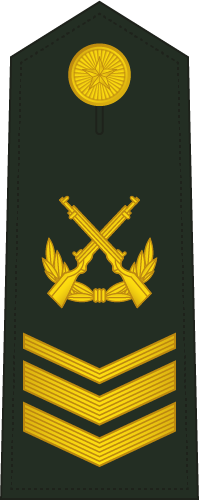
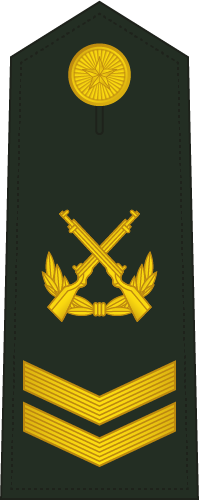
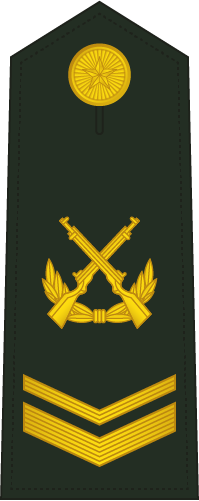
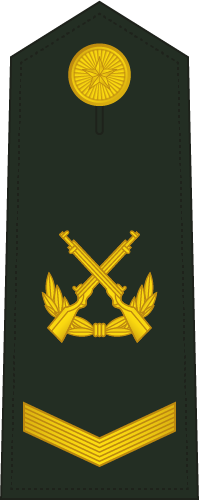
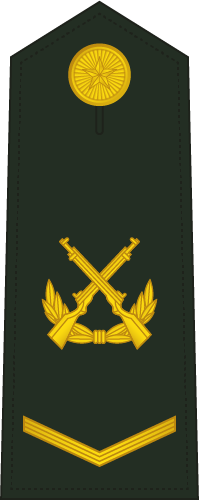
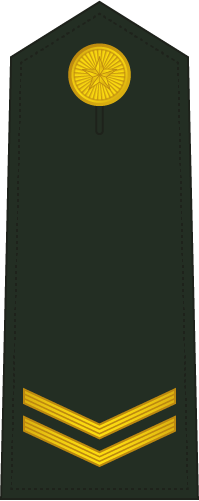
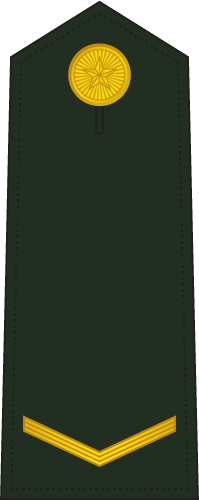
| Rank group | Senior NCOs | | | | | | Junior NCOs | Enlisted |
|---|---|---|---|---|---|---|---|---|---|
| PLA Strategic Support Force |
| PLA Strategic Support Force | 一级军士长; Yījí jūnshìzhǎng | 二级军士长; Èrjí jūnshìzhǎng | 三级军士长; Sānjí jūnshìzhǎng | 四级军士长; Sìjí jūnshìzhǎng | 上士; Shàngshì | 中士; Zhōngshì | 下士; Xiàshì | 上等兵; Shàngděngbīng | 列兵; Lièbīng |

== In popular culture ==
- The People's Liberation Army Strategic Support Force appears in episode 2x03 of the Netflix comedy series Space Force, titled "The Chinese Delegation". In this episode, it is revealed that the commander of the People's Liberation Army Strategic Support Force in the series' universe is General Gao Xiaoling (played by Kelvin Han Yee) and that a delegation led by him travels to the United States to discuss a deal with the team led by the series' protagonist, General Mark R. Naird (played by Steve Carell).
