= National Defense Commission (China) =

Defunct government body

National Defense Commission of the People's Republic of China
- 中华人民共和国国防委员会
- National emblem of China

Commission overview
- Formed: September 1954
- Preceding Commission: People's Revolutionary Military Commission
- Dissolved: January 1975
- Superseding Commission: Central Military Commission

National Defense Commission
- Simplified Chinese: 中华人民共和国国防委员会
- Traditional Chinese: 中華人民共和國國防委員會
Transcriptions
Standard Mandarin
- Hanyu Pinyin: Zhōnghuá rénmín gònghéguó guófáng wěiyuánhuì

The National Defense Commission of the People's Republic of China was the highest military advisory body of China from 1954 to 1975. The National Defense Commission was led by the state chairman, who was assisted by vice chairmen and several members. It existed concurrently with the Central Military Commission of the Chinese Communist Party.

== History ==
Previously, from the establishment of the People's Republic of China on 1 October 1949 to 27 September 1954, the People's Revolutionary Military Commission of the Central People's Government was the highest military command organ of the state, composed of one chairman, several vice chairmen and members, whose members were appointed and removed by the Central People's Government Council. Its powers were to govern and command the People's Liberation Army (PLA) and other armed forces. When the Commission existed, there was no separate highest military leadership organ of the Chinese Communist Party (CCP). This was different from the situation from 1954 to 1975 when the Central Military Commission of the CCP and the National Defense Commission coexisted, and from 1982 to the present when the Central Military Commission of the CCP and the State Central Military Commission coexist.

The Constitution of China, adopted at the first session of the 1st National People's Congress in September 1954, stipulated the establishment of the National Defense Commission of the People's Republic of China, replacing the People's Revolutionary Military Commission of the Central People's Government. In January 1975, the revised Constitution of China, adopted at the first session of the 4th National People's Congress, abolished the National Defense Commission, stipulating that the Chairman of the Central Committee of the Chinese Communist Party would command the national armed forces. In December 1982, the Constitution adopted at the fifth session of the 5th National People's Congress established the Central Military Commission of the People's Republic of China to lead the national armed forces.

== Powers ==
The 1954 Constitution did not explicitly define the powers of the National Defense Commission. Article 42 of this Constitution stated: "The Chairman of the People's Republic of China commands the armed forces of the whole country and serves as the Chairman of the National Defense Commission," meaning that the command of the armed forces belonged to the Chairman of the People's Republic. However, in practice, the National Defense Commission was a military advisory body, lacking decision-making power, military command power, and military decision-making power. In fact, on the night of the day this Constitution was adopted, 20 September 1954, the Politburo of the Chinese Communist Party held a meeting and decided to establish and form the Central Military Commission of the Chinese Communist Party as a military work decision-making body under the leadership of the Politburo.

== Membership ==
The National Defense Commission consisted of a chairman, vice chairmen, and several members. The chairman of the National Defense Commission was the Chairman of the People's Republic of China, and the other members were nominated by the chairman and decided by the National People's Congress.

=== The first session (1954-1959) ===
The Vice Chairman and members of the National Defense Commission were appointed by Chairman Mao Zedong of the People's Republic of China on 29 September 1954, in accordance with the decision of the first session of the 1st National People's Congress.

- Chairman: Mao Zedong
- Vice Chairmen: Zhu De, Peng Dehuai, Lin Biao, Liu Bocheng, He Long, Chen Yi, Deng Xiaoping, Luo Ronghuan, Xu Xiangqian, Nie Rongzhen, Ye Jianying, Cheng Qian, Zhang Zhizhong, Fu Zuoyi, and Long Yun (removed from office on 1 February 1958)
- The committee consisted of 81 members, listed in order of the number of strokes in their surnames: Yu Xuezhong, Wang Shitai, Wang Hongkun, Wang Bingzhang, Wang Xinting, Wang Zhen, Wang Shusheng, Song Renqiong, Song Shilun, Lü Zhengcao, Li Xiannian, Li Mingyang, Li Minghao, Lin Zun, Zhou Shidi, Zhou Baozhong, Zhou Chunquan, Ngapoi Ngawang Jigme, Hong Xuezhi, Tang Shengzhi, Tang Liang, Xu Haidong, Sun Weiru, Xu Shiyou, Xu Guangda, Wei Guoqing, Ulanhu, Ma Hongbin, Gao Shuxun, Zhang Zongxun, Zhang Guohua, Zhang Yunyi, Zhang Aiping, Zhang Dazhi, Chen Shiju, Chen Zaidao, Chen Qihan, Chen Mingren, and Chen Shaokuan. Chen Geng, Chen Xilian, Tao Zhiyue, Lu Zhonglin, Peng Shaohui, Zeng Zesheng, Su Yu, He Bingyan, Feng Baiju, Huang Yongsheng, Huang Kecheng, Huang Qixiang (dismissed on February 1, 1958), Yang Chengwu, Yang Yong, Yang Dezhi, Dong Qiwu, Ye Fei, Wan Yi, Liao Hansheng, Pei Changhui, Zhao Erlu, Liu Wenhui, Liu Yalou, Liu Shanben, Liu Fei, Deng Zhaoxiang, Deng Hua, Deng Xihou, Deng Baoshan, Teng Daiyuan, Cai Tingkai, Zheng Dongguo, Lu Han, Xiao Ke, Xiao Jingguang, Yan Hongyan, Seypidin Azizi, Han Xianchu, Han Liancheng, Luo Ruiqing, Tan Zheng, Su Zhenhua

=== The second session (1959-1964) ===
The Vice Chairman and members of the National Defense Commission were appointed on 28 April 1959, by Chairman Liu Shaoqi of the People's Republic of China in accordance with the decision of the first session of the 2nd National People's Congress and by the "Presidential Decree of the People's Republic of China".

- Chairman: Liu Shaoqi
- Vice Chairmen: Peng Dehuai, Lin Biao, Liu Bocheng, He Long, Chen Yi, Deng Xiaoping, Luo Ronghuan, Xu Xiangqian, Nie Rongzhen, Ye Jianying, Cheng Qian, Zhang Zhizhong, Fu Zuoyi, Wei Lihuang, Cai Tingkai (appointed on April 16, 1962)
- The committee consisted of 100 members, listed in order of the number of strokes in their surnames: Yu Xuezhong, Wan Yi, Wei Guoqing, Wang Ping, Wang Shitai, Wang Hongkun, Wang Bingzhang, Wang Shusheng, Wang Jian'an, Wang Xinting, Wang Zhen, Deng Zhaoxiang, Deng Hua, Deng Baoshan, Deng Xihou, Kong Congzhou, Lu Han, Ye Fei, Liu Wenhui, Liu Yalou, Liu Shanben, Liu Fei, Sun Weiru, Song Renqiong, Song Shilun, Su Zhenhua, Li Tianyou, Li Da, Li Xiannian, Li Mingyang, Li Minghao, Li Juikui, Chen Shiju, Chen Zaidao, Chen Bojun, Chen Qihan, Chen Mingren, Chen Shaokuan, Chen Tie, Chen Geng, Chen Xilian, Lü Zhengcao, Zheng Dongguo, Lin Weixian, Lin Zun, Zhang Yunyi, Zhang Dazhi, Zhang Zongxun, Zhang Guohua, Zhang Aiping, Ngapoi Ngawang Jigme, Luo Ruiqing, Zhou Shidi, Zhou Baozhong, Zhou Chunquan, Hong Xuezhi, Zhao Erlu, Zhao Shoushan, Hou Jingru, Gao Shuxun, Tang Shengzhi, Tang Liang, Ma Hongbin, Sangpo Tsewang Rinchen, Ulanhu, Xu Haidong, Xu Shiyou, Xu Guangda, Guo Tianmin, Lu Zhonglin, Xiao Ke, Xiao Jingguang, Tao Zhiyue, Feng Baiju, Zeng Zesheng, Peng Shaohui, Su Yu, Qin Yizhi, He Bingyan, Huang Yongsheng, Huang Zhengqing, Huang Kecheng

=== The Third Session (1965-1975) ===
The Vice Chairman and members of the National Defense Commission were appointed on 4 January 1965, by Chairman Liu Shaoqi of the People's Republic of China in accordance with the decision of the first session of the 3rd National People's Congress and by the issuance of Presidential Decree No. 3 of the People's Republic of China.

- Chairman: Liu Shaoqi (1965–1969)
- Vice Chairmen: Lin Biao, Liu Bocheng, He Long, Chen Yi, Deng Xiaoping, Xu Xiangqian, Nie Rongzhen, Ye Jianying, Luo Ruiqing (suspended from duty in December 1965), Cheng Qian, Zhang Zhizhong, Fu Zuoyi, Cai Tingkai
- The committee consisted of 107 members: Fang Qiang, Wang Ping, Wang Shitai, Wang Hongkun, Wang Zheng, Wang Bingzhang, Wang Jian'an, Wang Shusheng, Wang Enmao, Wang Xinting, Wang Zhen, Wei Guoqing, Ulanhu, Deng Zhaoxiang, Deng Baoshan, Kong Congzhou, Lu Han, Ye Fei, Liu Wenhui, Liu Xingyuan, Liu Yalou, Liu Zhijian, Liu Peishan, Liu Shanben, Liu Fei, Xu Shiyou, Xu Guangda, Lü Zhengcao, Sun Daguang, Sun Zhiyuan, Sun Weiru, Song Renqiong, Song Shilun, Su Zhenhua, Li Tianyou, Li Da, Li Chengfang, Li Xiannian, Li Shouxuan, Li Zuopeng, Li Mingyang, Li Minghao, Li Tao, Li Juikui, Yang Chengwu, Yang Zhicheng, Yang Yong, Yang Dezhi, Wu Kehua, Wu Faxian, Qiu Huizuo, Qiu Chuangcheng, Zhang Yunyi, and Zhang Dazhi. Zhang Zongxun, Zhang Guohua, Zhang Aiping, Ngapoi Ngawang Jigme, Chen Shiju, Chen Zaidao, Chen Bojun, Chen Qihan, Chen Mingren, Chen Shaokuan, Chen Tie, Chen Xilian, Zheng Dongguo, Lin Weixian, Lin Zun, Zhou Shidi, Zhou Chunquan, Zhao Erlu, Zhao Shoushan, Hou Jingru, Gao Shuxun, Guo Tianmin, Tang Shengzhi, Tang Liang, Qin Jiwei, Xu Haidong, Sangpo Tsewang Rinchen, Tao Zhiyue, Lu Zhonglin, Yan Hongyan, Xiao Hua, Xiao Ke, Xiao Jingguang, Xiao Wangdong, Cui Tianmin, Zeng Zesheng, Xie Fuzhi, Peng Shaohui, Huang Yongsheng, Huang Xinting, Dong Qiwu, Han Xianchu, Su Yu, Qin Yizhi, Cheng Zihua, Fu Qiutao, Fu Zhong, Lai Chuanzhu, Zhan Caifang, Seypidin Azizi, Liao Hansheng, Pei Changhui, Teng Daiyuan
