= Chen Bojun =

Chinese military officer

- 陈伯钧
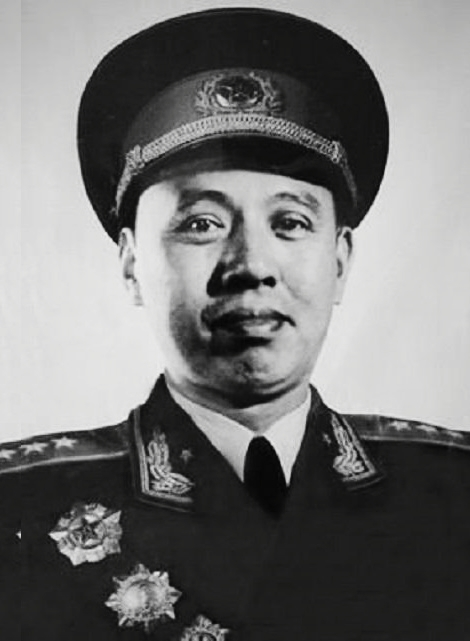

Dean for the PLA National Defence University
- In office September 1962 – May 1965
- Chairman: Mao Zedong

Personal details
- Born: November 26, 1910 Dachuan District, Sichuan, Qing Empire
- Died: February 6, 1974 (aged 63) Beijing
- Party: Chinese Communist Party
- Education: Whampoa Military Academy
- Awards: Order of Bayi (First Class Medal) Order of Independence and Freedom (First Class Medal) Order of Liberation (First Class Medal)

Military service
- Allegiance: China
- Branch/service: People's Liberation Army
- Years of service: 1927–1974
- Rank: General
- Commands: Eighth Route Army
- Battles/wars: Long March, Sino-Japanese War, Chinese Civil War

Chen Bojun (陈伯钧 or 陈国懋; pinyin:Chén Bójūn or Chén Guómào; November 26, 1910 – February 6, 1974), was a general of the People's Liberation Army from the Sichuan Province, Dachuan District.

Chen Bojun was trained in Whampoa Military Academy in 1926, and joined the Chinese Communist Party in 1927, participating in the Autumn Harvest Uprising. He rose through the ranks, holding many divisional level commands and participated in the Long March. During the Second Sino-Japanese War and the Chinese Civil War, he held top positions in the Fourth Field Army and the Eighth Route Army. After the establishment of the PRC, Chen held the roles of commander of Hunan's garrison, PLA Military Academy's Vice Head Training and acting Head of the Academy. In 1955, Chen was awarded the rank of a General.

== Biography ==
=== During the Early Red Army ===
Chen's participation in the May Fourth Movement and nationalistic inclination led to him being expelled from the Wanxian Shen Provincial School in 1916. In 1926 he enrolled in the Republic of China Military Academy in Wuhan. In May 1927, Chen joined the Chinese Communist Party at Xianning during the Autumn Harvest Uprising

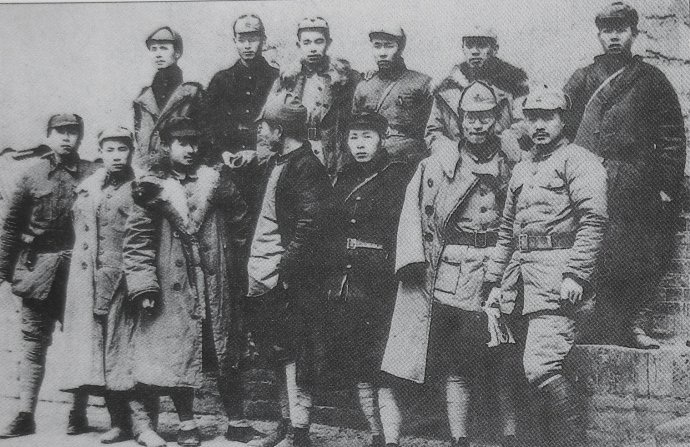
Picture of some of the military leaders after the Red Army's long march, Front row from left: Gan Siqi, He Bingyan, Guan Xiangying, Wang Zhen, Li Jingquan, Zhu Rui, He Long. Back row from left: Zhang Ziyi, Liu Yaqiu, Liao Hansheng, Zhu Ming, Chen Bojun, Lu Dongsheng

In October 1934, Chen took part in the Long March and was appointed Commander of the Red Ninth Army. On July 21, 1935, Chen was demoted to chief commissioner of the Red Army University as he refuted the orders of Zhang Guotao to go against Mao Zedong route of the march.

=== Second Sino-Japanese War (1936-1945) ===
Chen served as one of the divisional commanders of the Eighth Route Army during the Second Sino-Japanese War. As the head of the Counter-Japanese Military and Political University in 1938, he opposed Mao's marriage to Jiang Qing. During his return to Yan'an in 1940, Chen authored a book on "A Brief History of the Eighth Route Army".

=== Chinese Civil War (1945-1949) ===
In May 1948, he served as deputy commander of the Northeast Field Army's First Corps, participating in the Liaoshen Campaign, the Siege of Changchun and the Pingjin Campaign. In January 1949, he served as deputy commander of the Tianjin garrison.

=== After the establishment of the PRC ===
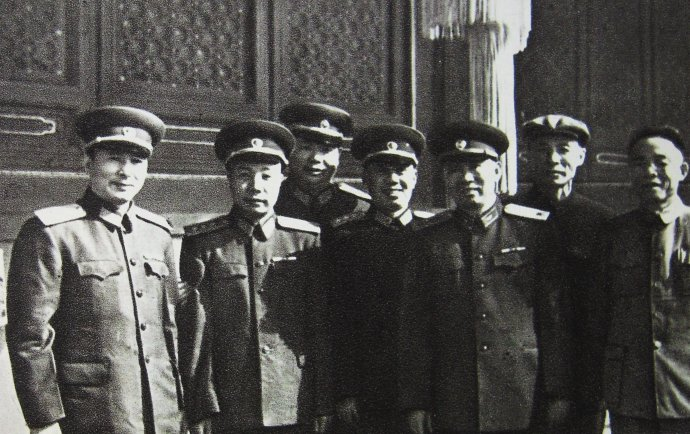
PLA generals on October 1, 1949. From left: Xiao Xiangrong, Xiao Hua, Chen Xilian, Chen Bojun, Liu Yalou, Lü Zhengcao, Han Xianchu.

In December 1952, Chen served as Deputy Minister of the Department of the PLA Military Training Academy. In 1953, Chen was the deputy Minister of Education and Vice President of the Military Academic Research Department in 1955. In the same year Chen was awarded the rank of general, Order of Bayi, Order of Liberation and Order of Independence and Freedom. During the Cultural Revolution, Chen was persecuted by the Red Guards, and framed by Lin Biao.

On February 6, 1974, Chen died of illness in Beijing.
