= Zhou Shidi =

Chinese general (1900–1979)

- 周士第
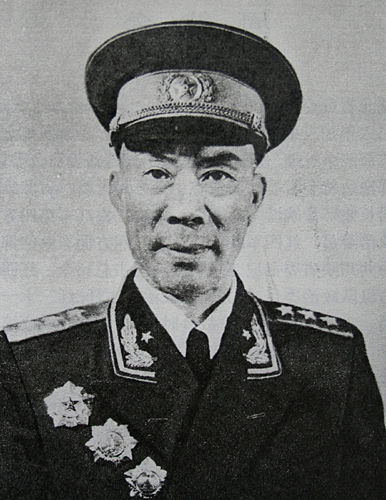
- Born: 9 September 1900; Xinchang, Lehui County, Guangdong, Qing China (now Qionghai, Hainan)
- Died: 30 June 1979 (aged 78); Beijing, China
- Military career
- Allegiance: Republic of China (1924–1927); Chinese Communist Party; China
- Branch: National Revolutionary Army; Chinese Red Army; People's Liberation Army
- Service years: 1924–1979
- Rank: General (1955)
- Commands: 73rd Regiment, National Revolutionary Army; 25th Division, 11th Army; 18th Army Group; PLA Air Defense Force
- Conflicts: Northern Expedition; Nanchang uprising Second Sino-Japanese War; Chinese Civil War

Zhou Shidi (Chinese: 周士第; pinyin: Zhōu Shìdì; 9 September 1900 – 30 June 1979) was a Chinese military officer and a general of the People's Liberation Army (PLA). A graduate of the first class of the Whampoa Military Academy, he served in Ye Ting's Independent Regiment during the Northern Expedition, and he commanded a regiment in the Nanchang uprising of 1927. During the Second Sino-Japanese War, he was chief of staff of the 120th Division of the Eighth Route Army, and in the Chinese Civil War he commanded the 18th Army Group. After 1949, he was the first commander of the PLA Air Defense Force, and he was made a general in 1955.

== Early life ==
Zhou was born on 9 September 1900 into a farming family in Xinchang village, Lehui County, Guangdong (now Qionghai, Hainan). He began attending a village school at the age of seven, and at 14 he entered Qiongya Middle School. He left the school after his father's death, and he returned in 1917. During the May Fourth Movement in 1919, he was elected a secretary of the Qiongya student federation. In the autumn of 1920, he began teaching at a local school, but he resigned after about a year. In the spring of 1923, he went to Guangzhou and enlisted in the Yunnan Army of Yang Ximin.

== Military career ==
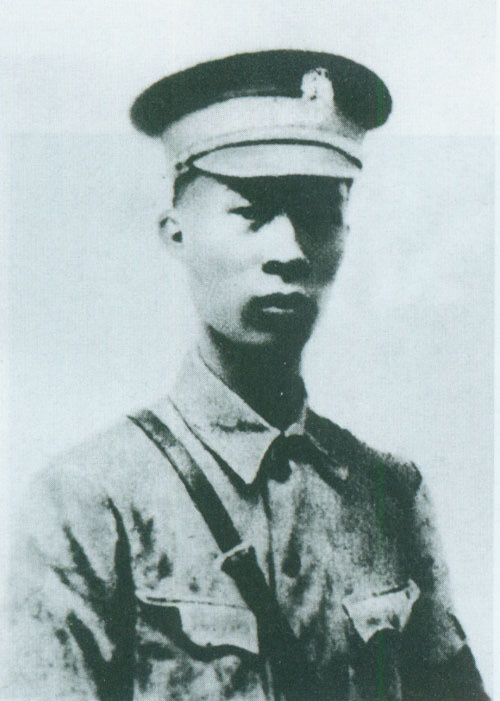
Zhou Shidi at Whampoa Military Academy

In May 1924, Zhou was admitted to the first class of the Whampoa Military Academy, and he graduated in November that year. After graduating, he helped to set up the Armored Train Unit of Sun Yat-sen's Generalissimo's headquarters, which was organized under the direction of Zhou Enlai, and he rose from platoon leader to deputy commander and then commander of the unit. He joined the Chinese Communist Party (CCP) in December 1924. During the Canton–Hong Kong strike of 1925, he led the unit to relieve the workers' militia at Shayuyong, near Shenzhen, and he was wounded seven times while breaking out of an encirclement. His comrades called him the "Armored Knight".

In November 1925, the unit became the core of the Independent Regiment of the Fourth Army of the National Revolutionary Army, founded at Zhaoqing under the command of Ye Ting. Zhou commanded its 1st Battalion, and about five months later he became the regiment's chief of staff. He was the highest-ranking Whampoa graduate in the regiment. In May 1926, the regiment became the vanguard of the Northern Expedition, and Zhou's battalion led the advance in the battles of Tingsiqiao and Heshengqiao and in the siege of Wuchang. The regiment's victories helped to drive the forces of Wu Peifu out of Hunan and Hubei, and they earned it the nickname "Iron Army". On 10 October 1926, during the third assault on Wuchang, Zhou was made acting regimental commander. In the winter of 1926, the regiment was reorganized as the 73rd Regiment of the 25th Division, and Zhou became its commander.

=== Nanchang uprising ===
In 1927, Zhou's regiment was stationed along the Nanchang–Jiujiang railway. On 1 August 1927, he refused an order from Li Hanhun to follow Zhang Fakui, and, on the decision of the party's front committee, he led the 73rd Regiment into the Nanchang uprising. That afternoon, under the pretext of a field exercise, his regiment and two other units moved by train to join the main rebel force in Nanchang. He was then appointed commander of the 25th Division of the 11th Army. After the rebel forces were defeated in the Chaozhou–Shantou area, Zhou was sent to Hong Kong and Shanghai to make contact with the party. In January 1928, he reported to Li Lisan in Hong Kong, and he was treated for malaria with money provided by Zhang Yunyi.

Zhou then went to Malaya to recover, but he returned to China after learning of the "Third Party" founded by Deng Yanda. In the winter of 1929, he joined the Whampoa Revolutionary Alumni Association in Shanghai, which opposed Chiang Kai-shek's Whampoa alumni organization. Over the following years, he moved between Hong Kong, Nanjing, Shanghai, Xi'an and Fujian, and he took part in plans to overthrow Chiang. In 1933, he urged Cai Tingkai of the 19th Route Army to ally with the Red Army against Chiang and Japan. He then acted as an intermediary between the Fujian People's Government and the Red Army, whose negotiators were Pan Hannian and Zhang Yunyi.

=== Long March ===
During the Long March, which began in 1934, Zhou served as a section chief in the senior cadres' company of the cadres' regiment that had been formed from the Red Army University. In October 1935, he was readmitted to the CCP, with Luo Guibo as his sponsor. According to the Shenzhen newspaper Jingbao, the eulogy approved by the Central Military Commission after his death counted his party membership from 1928.

=== Second Sino-Japanese War ===
After the Marco Polo Bridge incident of July 1937, the main forces of the Red Army were reorganized as the Eighth Route Army, and Zhou became chief of staff of its 120th Division, under He Long, Guan Xiangying and Xiao Ke. He became known in the army as a "model chief of staff". In October 1937, he helped He Long and Guan Xiangying to direct attacks on Japanese supply lines behind the Xinkou front, and he personally led a cavalry company in an attack on Ningwu County. In March and April 1938, the division defeated five Japanese encirclement campaigns in north-western Shanxi, and Mao Zedong sent a telegram praising it.

Zhou took part in the battles of Chenzhuang and Huangtuling, and in the autumn of 1940 he helped to defeat three Japanese "mopping-up" campaigns. He also took part in the Hundred Regiments Offensive. In October 1942, he proposed forming armed work teams to operate behind the Japanese lines, and according to the Xinhua News Agency these teams retook more than 3,000 villages.

=== Second half of the Chinese Civil War ===
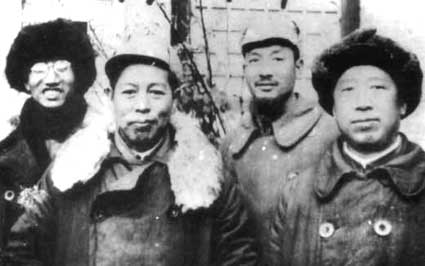
The leaders of the Shanxi-Hebei-Shandong-Henan Military Region. From left to right: Xu Xiangqian, Wang Shiying, Zhou Shidi and Teng Daiyuan (1947)

During the civil war, Zhou served as commander and political commissar of the Jinbei (Northern Shanxi) Field Army. In May 1948, he was transferred to the 1st Army Group of the North China Military Region as deputy commander and chief of staff, and he assisted Xu Xiangqian in the Jinzhong campaign. In April 1949, he and Xu took Taiyuan. On 16 May 1949, the army group was renamed the 18th Army Group, and Zhou was appointed its commander and political commissar. He then took part in the Fu–Mei campaign in Shaanxi and in the advances into northwestern and southwestern China. Chengdu was taken by the communist forces in December 1949.

== People's Republic of China ==
After the founding of the People's Republic of China, Zhou was deputy commander of the Southwest Military Region. On 19 October 1950, he was appointed commander of the newly formed PLA Air Defense Force, with Zhong Chibing as its political commissar. Its headquarters was formally established on 16 December 1950. According to Jingbao, the air defense units fought 10,038 engagements against American aircraft during the Korean War. Zhou later served as deputy director of the General Training Inspectorate and head of its military training department, and as a military adviser to the General Staff Department. On 27 September 1955, he was awarded the rank of general.

He was a member of the first three National Defense Commissions, and of the standing committees of the 3rd and 4th National Committees of the Chinese People's Political Consultative Conference. He fell ill in 1959, and he then gave up his active posts. From March 1978 until his death, he was a member of the Standing Committee of the 5th National People's Congress.

Zhou was persecuted during the Cultural Revolution, and he refused to cooperate with his investigators, repeatedly telling them that he did not remember or did not know. In September 1969, he was moved from Beijing to Guangzhou, and he returned to Beijing in poor health in May 1972. His memoirs were compiled for publication in April 1979.

== Death ==
Zhou died of illness in Beijing on 30 June 1979. In a 2019 profile, Xinhua described him as a senior general who had taken part in all of China's revolutionary wars and contributed to the modernization of the PLA, and it reported that Mao had praised his "proletarian communist steadfastness".

== Awards ==
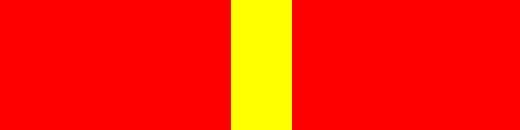
Order of August 1 (1st Class Medal) (1955)
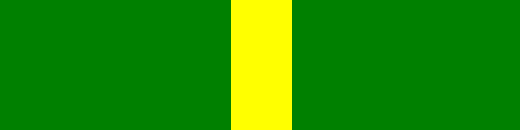
Order of Independence and Freedom (1st Class Medal) (1955)
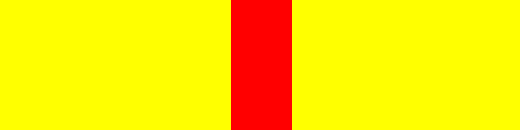
Order of Liberation (1st Class Medal) (1955)
