= Tang Liang =

- 唐亮
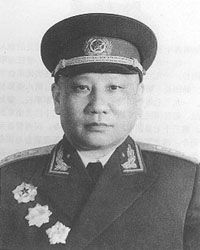

Political Commissar of the Nanjing Military Region
- In office March 1955 – January 1964
- Commander: Xu Shiyou
- Preceded by: New position
- Succeeded by: Xiao Wangdong

Personal details
- Born: 13 June 1910 Yonghe, Liuyang, Hunan, China
- Died: November 20, 1986 (aged 76) Beijing, China
- Awards: Order of Bayi (Second Class) Order of Independence and Freedom (First Class) Order of Liberation (China) (First Class)

Military service
- Allegiance: China
- Branch/service: Chinese Red Army; People's Liberation Army
- Years of service: 1930–1982
- Rank: General
- Commands: Deputy Political Director of the New Fourth Army
- Battles/wars: Second Sino-Japanese War, Chinese Civil War, Battle of Pingxingguan

Tang Liang (Chinese: 唐亮; pinyin: Táng Liàng; 13 June 1910 – 20 November 1986), also known as Tang Changxian (唐昌贤) or Tang Changmin (唐昌明), was a general in the People's Liberation Army of the People's Republic of China from Hunan.

== Biography ==
=== Early life ===
Tang was in Yonghe, Liuyang, Hunan Province. In 1926, he joined the local workers' union and later as a member of the Red Guards. He was appointed as the local member of the government propaganda and culture committee in 1929. Following his involvement in armed struggles in Liuyang, he joined the Chinese Workers' and Peasants' Red Army in and attained membership in the Chinese Communist Party in 1930. Following in August, he was appointed Party Secretary of the 2nd Division in the Red Eighth Army. He was known to be appointed as political commissar for several regiments of the division after having participated and wounded several times in local insurgencies during the Encirclement Campaigns. In October 1934 he was named the Red Third Army's Secretary and embarked on the Long March. After arrival in Shaanbei, he served as the Dean of the Department of Political Science in the 2nd Division of the First Red Army Corps, and later the Political Commissar of the division.

=== During the Second Sino-Japanese War ===
Following the outbreak of war, Wang was appointed as the Dean of the Political Department in the 115th Division of the Eighth Route Army, participating in the Battle of Pingxingguan. In August 1942, Tang Liang was transferred to the 4th Brigade in the Red West Army and was appointed party secretary of the CPC Hunan West Region. In beginning of 1943, due to overwork and exhaustion, he was sent to the Shandong Military Region Hospital for treatment.

In the spring of 1944, he was appointed as the political commissar of the Eighth Route Army following the death of Fu Zhuting. In local battles, he scored success in swaying the Nationalist commander to join the Red Army and assisted in the capitulation of Nationalist forces in Binhai.
