= Yang Zhicheng (PLA general) =

Chinese politician and general of the PLA (1903–1967)

- 杨至成
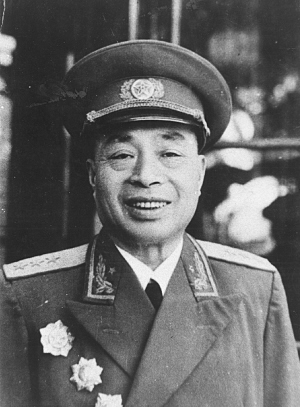
- Yang in 1955

Vice President of the PLA Higher Military Academy
- In office September 1962 – February 1967
- President: Chen Bojun; Li Jukui

Vice President of the PLA Academy of Military Sciences
- In office May 1958 – September 1963
- President: Ye Jianying

Personal details
- Born: Yang Xuqing; 30 November 1903 Sansui County, Guizhou, Qing China
- Died: 3 February 1967 (aged 63) Beijing, China
- Party: Chinese Communist Party
- Education: Republic of China Military Academy

Military service
- Allegiance: People's Republic of China
- Branch/service: Chinese Red Army; Eighth Route Army; People's Liberation Army Ground Force
- Years of service: 1926–1967
- Rank: General
- Battles/wars: Second Sino-Japanese War; Chinese Civil War

Chinese name
- Simplified Chinese: 杨至成
- Traditional Chinese: 楊至成
Transcriptions
Standard Mandarin
- Hanyu Pinyin: Yáng Zhìchéng

Yang Xuqing
- Simplified Chinese: 杨序清
- Traditional Chinese: 楊序清
Transcriptions
Standard Mandarin
- Hanyu Pinyin: Yáng Xùqīng

Yang Zhicheng (simplified Chinese: 杨至成; traditional Chinese: 楊至成; pinyin: Yáng Zhìchéng, 30 November 1903 – 3 February 1967) was a Chinese general who was one of the founders of the logistics system of the Chinese Red Army and the People's Liberation Army. A veteran of the Nanchang Uprising and the Long March, he headed the Red Army's general supply department in the Central Soviet Area and organised supplies for the communist forces in Northeast China during the Chinese Civil War. He was made a general in 1955 and later served as vice president of the Academy of Military Sciences. He was the only one of the generals of 1955 who came from Guizhou.

== Early life and education ==
Yang was born on 30 November 1903 into a Dong peasant family in Sansui County, Guizhou. In 1917, he entered the Guizhou A-type Agricultural School in Guiyang. In 1922, he left home, and in 1923, he joined the Sichuan–Yunnan–Guizhou Allied Army in Chongqing as a battalion quartermaster. In the summer of 1925, he went with the army to Guangdong and took part in the Northern Expedition.

In March 1926, Yang entered the fifth class of the Whampoa Military Academy, and that year he joined the Communist Youth League, introduced by Zhou Yiqun. In the spring of 1927, while at the Central Military and Political School in Wuhan, he joined the Chinese Communist Party, and he fought against the rebel forces of Xia Douyin.

== Military career ==
After graduating in June 1927, Yang was posted as a company political instructor to the 20th Army of the National Revolutionary Army, commanded by He Long, and on 1 August 1927, he took part in the Nanchang Uprising. In January 1928, he joined the Xiangnan Uprising led by Zhu De and Chen Yi, in which he was wounded in the right leg. In April 1928, he went with Zhu and Chen to the Jinggang Mountains, where he became a company commander in the 28th Regiment of the Fourth Army. During the defence of Huangyangjie, he helped haul a mortar onto the peak, and its shells struck the attackers' command post. He was later wounded in the abdomen, after which he became head of the rear office at Jinggangshan, responsible for the wounded and for food and medical supplies under blockade.

In April 1929, Yang became deputy adjutant of the Red Fourth Army, responsible for the daily needs of Zhu De and Mao Zedong, which began his career in military logistics. He raised 50,000 yuan and set up a temporary clothing factory, which produced more than 4,000 uniforms, the first standard uniforms issued to the whole army.

=== Central Soviet Area ===
From April 1930 to January 1933, Yang served successively as deputy adjutant of the Red 12th Army, head of the Red Army's general depot, and director and political commissar of the general supply department of the Central Revolutionary Military Commission. He became known as the Red Army's "chief steward". He built or reorganised more than 20 factories producing arms, ammunition, uniforms, textiles, shoes and medical supplies, set up five supply lines, and organised a "Red Post" postal service and telephone links between the army's headquarters and its units. In July 1933, he drafted the Red Army's first formal supply standards, which the Military Commission adopted. He was also head of administration at the Red Army School, and in 1933, he founded a supply school to train logistics officers. In 1934, during the fifth encirclement campaign, he criticised the policies of the party's leftist leadership, was blamed for the defeat at Guangchang and was removed from his supply post.

=== Long March and northern Shaanxi ===
Yang joined the Long March in October 1934. After the Zunyi Conference in January 1935, he was cleared and appointed head of the Military Commission's advance work group. The group raised food, money and supplies in Guizhou and in areas inhabited by ethnic minorities to support the four crossings of the Chishui River and the crossing of the Jinsha River. Before the crossing of Daxue Mountains, he organised purchases of sheepskin, wool, ginger and chilli, and after the First and Fourth Front Armies met, his committee raised more than 1.15 million jin of grain for the crossing of the grasslands.

In September 1935, Yang became head of logistics of the Shaanxi–Gansu Detachment, and in November 1935, he became head of logistics of the First Front Army. In 1936, he organised supplies for the eastern expedition across the Yellow River and the western expedition. He was also head of the Military Commission's logistics department and of the general depot of the Red Army's front headquarters.

=== Second Sino-Japanese War ===
In December 1936, Yang became head of administration at the Counter-Japanese Military and Political University. After the outbreak of the Second Sino-Japanese War, he headed the general supply department of the party's Central Military Commission and was garrison commander of Yanchang and Yanchuan on the Yellow River. In the winter of 1938, after being wounded five times, he went to the Soviet Union for medical treatment. He then studied at the party school of the Far Eastern Bureau and at the Frunze Military Academy, where he was the only Chinese officer to study rear-area logistics.

=== Second-half of the Chinese Civil War ===
Yang returned to China from Moscow in January 1946 and became political commissar of the general logistics department of the Northeast Democratic Allied Army. He organised military industry in Jiamusi, Harbin, Mudanjiang, Qiqihar and Jixi. In 1948, he became director of the quartermaster department of the Northeast Field Army, and he expanded its network of factories, depots, hospitals and warehouses to supply the defence of Siping and the Liaoshen and Pingjin campaigns. In December 1948, his supply work was praised at a logistics conference at Xibaipo.

== People's Republic of China ==
=== Central South ===
After 1949, Yang moved south with the Fourth Field Army and became director of the quartermaster departments of the Central China and Central South Military Regions and minister of light industry of the Central South Military and Administrative Committee. He was later first deputy chief of staff and director of logistics of the Central South Military Region. He set up dozens of supply plants, depots, hospitals and schools in cities including Wuhan, Zhengzhou, Guangzhou, Nanchang and Changsha, and helped take over and develop local light industry. During the Korean War, the Central South logistics department formed more than 50 support units with over 50,000 personnel and transported about 270,000 tonnes of supplies for the People's Volunteer Army.

=== Later career ===
Yang later became deputy director of the Armed Forces Supervision Department of the People's Liberation Army. In 1955, he was prmoted to general and in early 1958, he became vice president and head of administration of the Academy of Military Sciences. He oversaw the academy's construction and set up farms and livestock bases to feed its staff during the famine years. In 1962, he became vice president of the Higher Military Academy, working with Liu Bocheng. From 1964, he led the compilation of a history of the army's logistics, gathering about eight million characters of material before the Cultural Revolution halted the project. He was a member of the second and third National Defence Councils and of the Standing Committee of the 3rd National People's Congress.

Yang died in Beijing on 3 February 1967. According to the Guizhou CPPCC Daily, he died of a heart attack after being subjected to struggle sessions during the Cultural Revolution. A memorial service was held at the Babaoshan Revolutionary Cemetery on 6 February 1967, attended by Zhou Enlai, Ye Jianying and Chen Yi.

== Personal life ==
Yang married five times. His last wife, Tang Huiwen of Fushun, whom he married in Jiamusi in October 1946, died in October 2007. His children included a daughter, Yang Yuming, and the sons Yang Zijiang, Yang Zhujiang, Yang Haibin and Yang Tiejun.

== Awards and honors ==
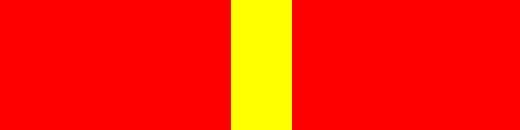
Order of August 1 (1st Class Medal) (1955)
Order of Independence and Freedom (2nd Class Medal) (1955)
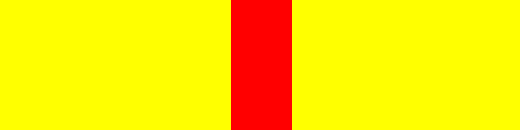
Order of Liberation (1st Class Medal) (1955)

A memorial hall dedicated to him is located in Sansui County.
