= Wang Xinting =

Chinese general

- 王新亭
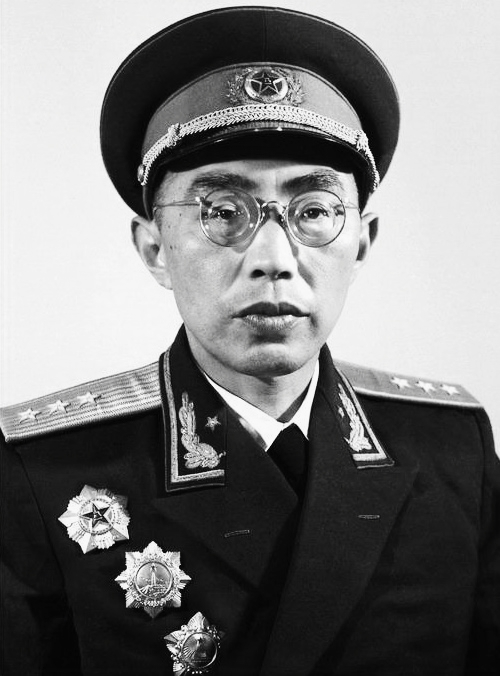

Member of the Central Military Commission
- In office 28 September 1954 – 1975
- Chairman: Mao Zedong

Personal details
- Born: 23 December 1908 Xiaogan, Hubei Province, China
- Died: December 11, 1984 (aged 75) Beijing, China
- Party: Chinese Communist Party
- Awards: Order of Bayi (First Class) Order of Independence and Freedom (First Class) Order of Liberation (China) (First Class)

Military service
- Allegiance: China
- Branch/service: People's Liberation Army
- Years of service: 1930–1984
- Rank: General
- Commands: 129th Division of the Eighth Route Army, Commander of Taiyue Military Region, Director of Politics in the Hebei – Shandong – Henan Military region
- Battles/wars: Encirclement Campaigns, Long March, Second Sino-Japanese War, Chinese Civil War, Chengdu Campaign

Wang Xinting (Chinese: 王新亭; pinyin: Wáng Xīntíng; 23 December 1908 – 11 December 1984) was a general in the People's Liberation Army of the People's Republic of China from Hubei.

== Biography ==
=== Early life ===
Wang was born into a humble peasant family in Xiaogan, Hubei Province. In the spring of 1926, he joined the workers' and peasants' movement. He joined the Chinese Red Army in 1930 and was appointed as a team leader. Following in September, he joined the Chinese Communist Party. In 1931, he was appointed Chinese Communist Party Committee Secretary of the 10th Division in the Red Fourth Army. Later in the year, he was appointed as the deputy secretary general of the army's political department. In October 1932, following the encirclement campaigns, Wang Xinting and Red Fourth Army evacuated Hubei and Henan in favor of Northern Sichuan. In July, he was appointed as the political director of the Red Ninth Army. Wang Xinting participated in the "anti-three-way siege" operations and "anti-six-way siege" operations. Wang Xinting joined the Long March in May 1935 and was later promoted to Chief Minister of the General Political Department of the Red Fourth Army. With the army's arrival in northern Shaanbei in 1936, Wang was concurrently appointed as the Political Director of the Red Thirty-First Army.

=== During the Second Sino-Japanese War ===
Following the outbreak of war, Wang was appointed as the Political Director in the 129th Division of the Eighth Route Army, assisting in the expansion of the army in the Shanxi – Changzhi region. In January 1938, he was appointed as the political commissar of the 386th Brigade and worked alongside Chen Geng. On 22 February 1938, the brigade ambushed and killed more than 130 Japanese troops. The 386th Brigade was notoriously known for their guerilla warfare, and with other surrounding brigades inflicted over 4000 casualties to the Imperial Japanese Army. The Japanese hunt for the brigade extended to pasting slogans on such as "focus your attack on the 386th Brigade" on their tanks.
