= Liang Xingchu =

Chinese general who fought in Korea

Lieutenant General Liang Xingchu
- 梁兴初
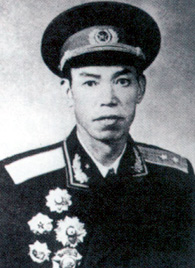
- Liang Xingchu in 1955

Personal details
- Born: August 23, 1913 Ji'an County, Jiangxi, China
- Died: October 5, 1985 (aged 72) Beijing, China
- Awards: Order of Bayi (Second Class); Order of Independence and Freedom (First Class); Order of Liberation (First Class)

Military service
- Allegiance: China
- Branch/service: People's Liberation Army Ground Force
- Rank: Lieutenant General
- Commands: Chengdu Military Region
- Battles/wars: Chinese Civil War; Second Sino-Japanese War; Korean War

Liang Xingchu (Chinese: 梁兴初; pinyin: Liáng Xīngchū; 23 August 1913 – 5 October 1985) was a lieutenant general in the People's Liberation Army. Born in Ji'an County, Jiangxi Province, he served as the commander of the 38th Group Army during the Korean War. Liang died in Beijing.
