= Lü Zhengcao =

Founding PLA general who served three armies

Colonel General Lü Zhengcao
- 吕正操
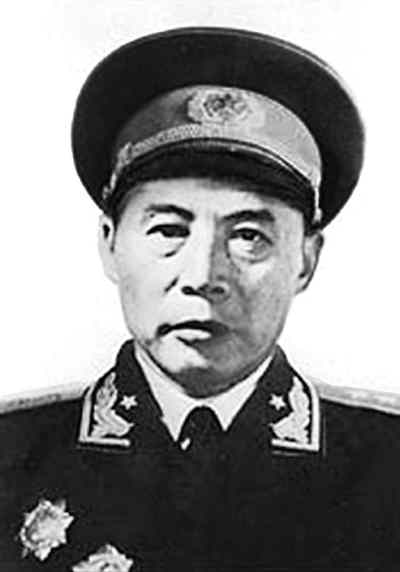

Minister of Railways
- In office 1965–1970
- Premier: Zhou Enlai
- Preceded by: Teng Daiyuan
- Succeeded by: Post abolished Wan Li (post re-established)

Vice Chairman of the Chinese People's Political Consultative Conference
- In office 1983–1988
- Chairperson: Deng Yingchao

Personal details
- Born: 4 January 1904 Haicheng, Fengtian, Qing dynasty
- Died: 13 October 2009 (aged 105) Beijing, People's Republic of China
- Resting place: Babaoshan Revolutionary Cemetery
- Party: Kuomintang; Chinese Communist Party
- Spouse: Liu Sha
- Children: Lü Tongyin; Lü Tongyu; Lü Tongyan; Lü Tongxin
- Education: Northeast Military Academy

Military service
- Branch/service: Northeastern Army; National Revolutionary Army; PLA Ground Force
- Years of service: 1922-1977
- Rank: Colonel General
- Commands: Military Transportation Command, Central Military Commission; Military Transportation Bureau, General Staff Department; Northeast Railway Bureau; Songhua River Defense Command; Ximan Military Region; Jin-Sui Military Region; Jizhong Military Region; 3rd Column, Eighth Route Army; Jizhong People's Self-Defense Army; 647th Regiment, 116th Division, 53rd Army, National Revolutionary Army; 16th Brigade Staff, Northeastern Army
- Battles/wars: Second Zhili-Fengtian War; Second Sino-Japanese War; Chinese Civil War; Korean War
- Central institution membership: 1982–1987: 1st Central Advisory Commission; 1977–1982: Central Military Commission; 1954–1978: 1st, 2nd, 3rd, 4th National People's Congress; 1954–1978: 2nd, 3rd, 4th National Committee, Chinese People's Political Consultative Conference; 1954–1975: 1st, 2nd, 3rd National Defense Commission; 1945–1969, 1977–1982: 7th, 8th, 11th Central Committee

Lü Zhengcao (Note: Chinese: 吕正操; Pinyin: Lǚ Zhèngcāo; Wade-Giles: Lu³ Cheng⁴-ts’ao¹) (4 January 1904 – 13 October 2009) was a Chinese military officer and politician. Originally a follower of Northeastern warlord Zhang Xueliang, he became one of the founding Shang Jiang of the People's Liberation Army, and would go on to hold several important posts in military transportation and the railway industry for the People's Republic of China.

== Early life ==
Lü was born in Haicheng, in the province of Liaoning. He joined the Chinese Communist Party in 1937. He fought in China's war against Japan 1937–1945 as well as the civil war against the Kuomintang from 1945 to 1949.

In the spring of 1922, 17-year-old Lü Zhengcao, through the introduction of a distant relative, came to Shenyang to join the Northeastern Army, serving in the 9th Company, 3rd Battalion, 1st Regiment of Zhang Xueliang's Guard Brigade. Soon after, the Guard Brigade Headquarters started recruiting clerks, and Lü, who had only attended primary school, was selected by the examiners and transferred to the brigade's adjutant's office as a clerk with the rank of Sergeant. The young man was composed, articulate, and had neat and beautiful handwriting, deeply impressing Zhang Xueliang. In the winter of 1923, recommended by Zhang Xueliang, he passed the entrance exam for the fifth term of the Northeast Military Academy. After graduating in 1925, Lü Zhengcao served as a company commander, battalion commander, and a chief adjutant with the rank of Major in the Northeastern Army. In 1929, he was made Chief of Staff of the 16th Brigade with the rank of Lieutenant Colonel.

In the spring of 1934, his 647th Regiment moved to Beiping to take charge of the city's defense. At the time, Japanese troops stationed in Dongjiaomin Lane constantly provoked the city defense forces, attempting to find an excuse to seize Beiping's defenses, but were repeatedly met with resolute resistance from Lü's troops. In June 1935, Bai Jianwu, the commander of the armored car unit who had defected to hostile units under Shi Yousan, colluded with the invaders in an attempt to use armored cars to rush through the breach in the city wall east of Yongdingmen and seize Beiping in a coordinated attack. Shells landed in Beiping, causing panic among the citizens. Upon learning of the situation, Lü Zhengcao immediately led his troops by car to the breach at the old city wall to block the rebels. They shelled the armored vehicles, forcing the rebels to retreat. He then dispatched troops to Fengtai to cut off their retreat, launching a pincer attack that annihilated their entire force. This event was later known to historians as the "Beiping Incident".

Before he joined the Communists, Lieutenant Colonel Lü became the secretary and chief adjutant to the Kuomintang general, Zhang Xueliang, and was designated the Director of Zhang's Tongze Club, a famous social and entertainment venue. As Zhang's assistant, he frequently accompanied him to various social problem research meetings, scientific and current affairs lectures, reading groups, and travel groups organized by the Fengtian YMCA. Lü also persisted in learning English, playing tennis, and came into contact with some progressive youths and many progressive books promoting revolution. It was in this role that he was a witness to the Xi'an Incident, whereby Zhang and his fellow general, Yang Hucheng, forced the then-Chinese leader, Chiang Kai-shek, to suspend the civil war with the Communists in 1936 in order and join forces against the Japanese.

== Under Communist service ==
=== During the Second Sino-Japanese War and brief interval period ===
In 1936, he organized the "Northeast Armed Comrades Anti-Japanese National Salvation Vanguard Group", serving as its chief. While commanding the 647th Regiment (Note: According to other sources, he was the head of the 691st Regiment at the time. The website for the Chinese People's Political Consultative Conference's National Committee listed him as one-time leader of both these units.) (116th Division, Wan Fulin's 53rd Army), Lü broke away from the Kuomintang in 1937, renaming his unit the "Central Hebei People's Self-Defense Army" and joined the Communist Party. Lü then commanded a military force that fought the Japanese army in Northern China.

On April 1, 1944, the Jin-Sui Branch of the CCP Central Committee decided to establish an Audit Committee, with Lü Zhengcao serving as its chairman. On the same day, the Audit Committee issued the "Audit Regulations", which stipulated the audit objectives, organization and authority, budget and final accounts audits, as well as audit procedures for grain and fodder, clothing, foreign exchange, and handover. From December 1945 onwards, he served as a standing member of the CCP Central Committee's West Manchuria Branch Bureau and Commander of the West Manchuria Military Region, comprising Liaoning and Rehe.

=== Chinese Civil War ===
In June 1946, he was ordered to lead troops into the Northeast and transferred to the post of Deputy Commander of the Northeast Democratic Allied Army as well as heading of the Songhua River Defense Command, and in the following months, was made Vice Director of the Northeast Railway General Bureau, concurrently Deputy Commander and Director of the Northeast Railway Protection Corps' Political Department. When the Allied Army was renamed the Northeast People's Liberation Army in January 1948, Lü became Vice Director of the People's Revolutionary Military Commission's Railway Department. In the late 1940s, he was designated the Minister of Railways of the Chinese Communists' Northeast Administrative Committee (later renamed the Northeast People's Government). A U.S. State Department memorandum in 1948 described Lü as "an able tactician... reputedly [with] strong anti-Kuomintang [sympathies]."

To tap into potential and improve transportation capacity, Lü Zhengcao led the Northeast Railway Bureau in carrying out the "Resurrect Dead Locomotives" and "Bring Dead Trains Back to Life" campaigns. By the time of the Liaoshen Campaign, the Northeast Liberated Zone had received and repaired 885 locomotives and over 5,700 kilometers of rail, bringing the total operational length to 9,818 kilometers, accounting for 98% of the Northeast's railway network. In Northeast China, Japanese locomotives used a wheel-and-rider system, while Soviet locomotives used a crew-and-rider system, each with its own advantages and disadvantages. After comparative testing at two depots, practice proved that, under the conditions at the time, the crew-and-rider system was far superior to the wheel-and-rider system - the content of an article Lü penned. Receiving Mao Zedong's praise, he responded, "Much of what I said was layman's talk." Mao smiled and said, "Even laymen can become experts!"

During this time, Lü Zhengcao led the staff of the Railway Bureau and the population to support the Liaoxi front, risking their lives to covertly transport nearly 100,000 troops and a large amount of combat supplies to the front in just nine days using 64 military trains. Hostile aircraft were frequently flying at night, so the transport operation was conducted without lights. Despite the perilous and difficult conditions, including torrential rains and floodings in certain sections, no accidents occurred, ensuring the final victory of the Liaoshen Campaign. As town after town fell, captured Kuomintang commanders were utterly bewildered: "When you launched your attack, we had no idea where your troops came from!"

== People's Republic of China ==
=== As Vice Minister ===
Following the Communist victory of 1949, Lü served as a senior military and civil leader of the Central People's Government. In August 1950, he was identified by US intelligence as an alternate member of the CCP Central Committee.

Lü was promoted to Vice Minister of Railways with four others. As Deputy Commander of the Railway Corps of the Chinese People's Liberation Army (a unit directly attached to the General Headquarters), Commander of Military Transportation of the Central Military Commission and Director of Military Transportation of the General Staff Department, he was a leading figure in organizing and transporting provisions to the front during the Korean War. Faced with the enemy's relentless bombing, Lü Zhengcao went deep into the battlefield to direct railway repair and material transportation. He guided the troops to create a series of special repair methods, such as "opening up first and then reinforcing, starting with the easy and then the difficult, ensuring key points, and being prepared in advance." This ensured that the railway was repaired as it was bombed, repaired after bombing, and re-opened when one section was interrupted. Within the limited time of operation, the railway achieved high transportation efficiency, providing powerful support for the Chinese army's operations.

Then, he participated in the research and formulation of the national "First Five-Year Plan" for railway construction, and partook in the leadership of the Wuhan Yangtze River Bridge project, which boasts many world-leading technologies. Lü Zhengcao also directed to completion a series of trunk and branch railway projects, including the Chengyu, Tianlan, Xianggui, Lanxin, Baocheng, Fengsha, and Yingxia lines. From 1954, Lü began to represent Liaoning province at the National People's Congress, concurrently becoming a standing member of the National Committee of the Chinese People's Political Consultative Conference, and earned a seat on the National Defense Commission. By December 1954, he led a Chinese delegation to negotiate with the North Vietnamese on questions of communications. Lü was conferred the rank of Shang Jiang (Colonel General) in 1955, following the re-establishment of military ranks, and further awarded the First-Class Order of Independence and Freedom, the First-Class Order of Liberation, and the First-Class Red Star Medal of Honor. Since 1956, he had served as Chairman of the Chinese Tennis Association.

Lü Zhengcao was most interested in the railway project into Tibet. As early as September 1958, the first phase of the Qingzang Railway began construction, and 97 kilometers were laid by 1960. At the National Railway Leadership Conference held from 16 to 18 November 1958, Lü established the transportation policy of "taking coal transportation as the key link, vigorously supporting agriculture, ensuring key priorities, and making comprehensive arrangements" and the infrastructure policy of "combining traditional and modern methods, integrating large, medium, and small projects, consolidating the foundation and simplifying the branches, and strengthening the trunk and weakening the branches."

=== Minister of Railways ===
In mid-1960, he penned a series of writings on the implementation of a "mass movement" surrounding local railways and the extensive operation of railroads on the Red Flag magazine and the People's Daily. On 5 November 1964, the Ministry of National Defense appointed Lü Zhengcao as the First Political Commissar of the Railway Corps. In January 1965, at the 3rd National People's Congress, Liu Shaoqi, Chairman of the People's Republic of China, appointed him the Minister of Railways. From the second half of 1958, when Teng Daiyuan took sick leave, until early 1965 when he was officially appointed Minister of Railways, Lü had presided over the work of the Ministry in the capacity of Acting Minister and then Interim Minister.

During his time as Vice Minister of Railways, Lü was appointed to be Li Jingquan's number two on the Southwest Railroad Construction Headquarters. This body was created in 1964 to supervise railroad development during the Third Front construction of basic industry and national defense industry in China's rugged interior in preparation for potential invasion by the United States or the Soviet Union. As head of the Ministry, while focusing on railway transportation, he also emphasized comprehensively strengthening the railway system, vigorously cultivating railway professionals, actively promoting technological innovation, and striving to improve the national railway layout. He organized and directed the selection, surveying, design, bridge construction, and tunnel construction of many important railway sections, and also actively assisted in railway construction in North Korea and Vietnam, following instructions from the CCP Central Committee.

During the Cultural Revolution, he was accused of leading a "Northeast Anti-Party Group", forming an anti-Lin Biao clique with Peng Zhen and Lin Feng, which became known as the "Three Sworn Brothers of the Peach Garden". He was illegally detained. At the time, Mao Zedong told Premier Zhou Enlai to "protect Lü Zhengcao", but Jiang Qing and her clique repeatedly suppressed such actions. It wasn't until 1974, when Mao instructed that the matter be published in the newspapers by 1 August, that Lü Zhengcao regained his freedom. He once humorously remarked that during the Cultural Revolution, they said they would remove him from all his posts, but they forgot to remove his position as Chairman of the Chinese Tennis Association.

== Later life ==
In 1985, to support the return of the critically endangered Père David's deer to China, Lü Zhengcao helped found and chair the China Milu Foundation, now known as the China Biodiversity Conservation and Green Development Foundation. On 23 September 1990, he was awarded the International Tennis Federation's highest honor, the Medal of Honor, by the President of the International Tennis Federation, Philippe Chatrier.

In his submitted written opinion on the transportation industry to General Secretary Jiang Zemin in March 1990, Lü argued that China had only 53,000 kilometers of railways, especially in the resource-rich southwest and northwest regions, where railways were even fewer. He proposed building approximately 2,000 kilometers of new railways annually, and to bring the total operational mileage to at least 70,000 kilometers by 2000. From 1 to 13 June 1995, Lü Zhengcao inspected the Jingjiu Railway, which was under construction, from Beijing to Ganzhou, in an engineering command vehicle. After retiring, whenever Party and state leaders visited him, the topic he discussed most frequently remained railways.

On 13 October 2009, Lü died in Beijing at the age of 105 by Western age reckoning, or at the age of 106 by the traditional age system. At the time of his death, he was the last survivor among the founding Colonel Generals of the People's Liberation Army.
