= Wu Xian'en =

Chinese general

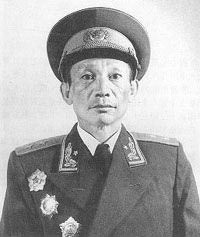
Wu Xian'en (1955)

Wu Xian'en (Chinese: 吴先恩) (August 30, 1907 – November 1, 1987) was a People's Liberation Army lieutenant general. He was born in Hong'an County, Hubei Province (his birthplace is now part of Xin County, Henan Province). He died in Beijing.

Wu received the August 1 Medal, first class, and the Order of Liberation, first class, when he was promoted to lieutenant general in 1955.
