= Yang Zhicheng =

Yang Zhicheng may refer to:

- Yang Zhicheng (Tang dynasty) (died 835?), Tang dynasty general
- Yang Zhicheng (PLA general) (1903–1967), People's Liberation Army general
- Ed Young (illustrator) (楊志成; Yáng Zhìchéng, 1931–2023), Chinese-born American illustrator
