= Supreme command of the armed forces in China =

In China, supreme command of the armed forces is exercised by the Central Military Commission (CMC) of the Chinese Communist Party (CCP). A parallel state CMC (PRC CMC) exists. Legally the two CMCs have separate responsibilities, but the distinction is practically irrelevant because the bodies typically have the same members. Since 1989, the CCP general secretary chairs the CMC, and represents the armed forces in the CCP Politburo Standing Committee, the country's ruling body. Per the chairman responsibility system, the chairman exercises absolute control over the CMC and is the commander-in-chief of the People's Liberation Army (PLA), the People's Armed Police (PAP) and the Militia.

== History ==
When the People's Republic of China (PRC) was founded in 1949, command of the People's Liberation Army (PLA) was transferred to the People's Revolutionary Military Commission, a state body, with the CCP leading the coalition government. The CCP CMC was abolished. The 1954 PRC constitution designated the president as the supreme commander, and also as the chair of the National Defense Commission (NDC). At the same time, the CCP CMC was reestablished and became the primary policy-making body for the armed forces. The separation of command and policy-making between the state and the party was bridged by the shared memberships of the state and party bodies; for example, Mao Zedong was president and CMC chairman from 1954 to 1959. In the late-1970s and the end of the Cultural Revolution, the presidency was abolished and revisions to the PRC and CCP constitutions made the CCP chairman the supreme commander.

Deng Xiaoping's political reforms again divided responsibilities for the armed forces between the party and the state. The 1982 PRC constitution created the PRC CMC to formally exercise supreme command, with the National People's Congress selecting the chairman, and handle all matters except political work. The CCP CMC — as defined in the 1982 CCP constitution — was responsible for political work. Again, conflicts between the CMCs were eliminated by shared membership.

The relationship between the CMCs and various state and party bodies can make the exercise of supreme command legally ambiguous. The ambiguity may have caused the CCP's regular demands for loyalty from the armed forces since the 1989 Tiananmen Square protests and massacre.
