= Li Da =

Li Da (Wade–Giles: Li Ta) is the name of:

- Li Renda (died 947), Five Dynasties period general and warlord, known as Li Da after 946
- Li Da (philosopher) (1890–1966), Chinese Marxist philosopher
- Li Da (general) (1905–1993), Chinese communist general
- Eric Liddell (1902–1945), Chinese name Li Da, Chinese-born Scottish athlete and missionary
