= Guo Tianmin =

- 郭天民
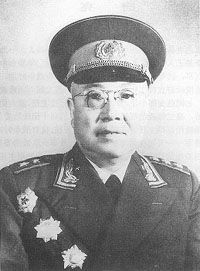

Senior Department Head of the PLA National Defence University
- In office 1958–1955
- Chairman: Mao Zedong

Personal details
- Born: 1905 Huang County, Hubei Province, China
- Died: May 26, 1970 (aged 64–65) Canton, Guangdong, China
- Party: Chinese Communist Party
- Education: Whampoa Military Academy
- Awards: Order of Bayi (First Class) Order of Independence and Freedom (First Class) Order of Liberation (China) (First Class)

Military service
- Allegiance: Chinese Communist Party; China
- Branch/service: People's Liberation Army
- Years of service: 1926–1989
- Rank: General
- Commands: Red Fourth Army
- Battles/wars: Guangzhou Uprising, Northern Expedition, Long March, Encirclement Campaigns, Second Sino-Japanese War, Chinese Civil War

Guo Tianmin (Chinese: 郭天民; pinyin: Guō Tiānmín; 1905 – 26 May 1970) was a general in the People's Liberation Army of the People's Republic of China from Hubei. He was a descendant of the Tang dynasty general Guo Ziyi.

== Early life ==
Guo had his primary education in the provincial agricultural school, and later enrolled into the Wuchang Zhonghua University's Affiliated Middle School. He returned to his hometown in Guangzhou in 1925, joining several local rebellions. In the following year, he enrolled into the Whampoa Military Academy. He joined the Chinese Communist Party (CCP) in March 1927 and participated in the Guangzhou Uprising in December. After the rebellion failed, he retreated to Haifeng, successively becoming the platoon leader and deputy commander in the 2nd and 4th Divisions of the workers and peasants revolutionary army.

In 1929, Guo traveled to Jiangxi to join the Red 4th Army and was appointed various positions such as division chief of staff and division commander. He was also made the chief of staff of the Jiangxi military region. However, he was expelled from his positions after supporting Mao Zedong and thereafter went to the Moscow Sun Yat-sen University to further his studies. He returned in October 1933 to resist the Nationalist forces during the Encirclement Campaigns.

In October 1934, he took part in the Long March. During the crossing of the Chishui River, he helped Luo Binghui command of the 9th Red Army Corps in operations. In July 1936, he was appointed as the commander in the Red Fourth Army and West Road Army headquarters. In 1937 February, he became the chief of staff of the Red Thirtieth Army, ordered to advance towards Dihua, Xinjiang.

== Second Sino-Japanese War ==
In December 1937, he went to Yan'an and was appointed the secretary of war in the CCP Central Military Commission. In 1938 August, Guo was the Shanxi-Chahar-Hebei military region's chief of staff. Subsequently, in December he was made the 2nd army division commander tasked to carry out the guerrilla war. He participated in major campaigns such as the 1940 Battle of Niangziguan during the Hundred Regiment Offensive. His command post of the Hebei military region was shifted to Zhangjiakou after its occupation in August 1945.
