= Liao Hansheng =

Chinese general and politician (1911–2006)

- 廖汉生
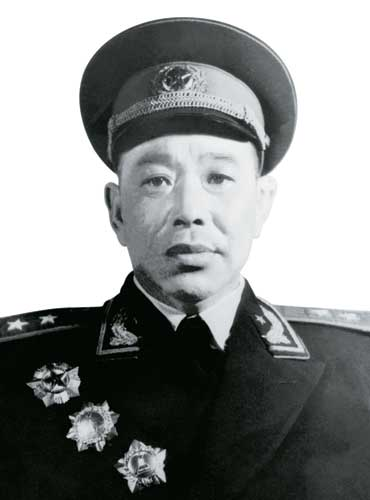
- Liao Hansheng in 1959

Vice Chairperson of the Standing Committee of the National People's Congress
- In office June 1983 – March 1993

First Political Commissar of the Shenyang Military Region
- Incumbent
- Assumed office January 1980

First Political Commissar of the Nanjing Military Region
- In office September 1977 – January 1980

Political Commissar of the Beijing Military Region
- In office January 1960 – January 1967

President of the PLA Military Academy
- Incumbent
- Assumed office 1957

Deputy Minister of National Defense
- Incumbent
- Assumed office 1954

Personal details
- Born: November 14, 1911 Sangzhi County, Hunan, Qing China
- Died: October 5, 2006 (aged 94) Beijing, China
- Party: Chinese Communist Party

Military service
- Allegiance: People's Republic of China
- Branch/service: Chinese Red Army; Eighth Route Army; People's Liberation Army Ground Force
- Rank: Lieutenant general
- Battles/wars: Long March; Second Sino-Japanese War; Chinese Civil War
- Awards: Order of August the First (1st Class); Order of Independence and Freedom (1st Class); Order of Liberation (1st Class)

Chinese name
- Simplified Chinese: 廖汉生
- Traditional Chinese: 廖漢生
Transcriptions
Standard Mandarin
- Hanyu Pinyin: Liào Hànshēng

Liao Hansheng (simplified Chinese: 廖汉生; traditional Chinese: 廖漢生; pinyin: Liào Hànshēng, November 14, 1911 – October 5, 2006) was a Chinese general and politician who served as a vice chairperson of the Standing Committee of the National People's Congress from 1983 to 1993. A Tujia from Hunan, he joined the armed struggle led by He Long in 1928 and took part in the Long March. He was made a lieutenant general in 1955 and served as a deputy minister of national defense, president of the PLA Military Academy and political commissar of several military regions. He was imprisoned during the Cultural Revolution.

== Early life ==
Liao was born on November 14, 1911, into a peasant family in Changrui Township, Sangzhi County, Hunan, an area now part of Qiaoziwan Township. He was of Tujia ethnicity. He joined the peasant movement in 1927, and in March 1928 he joined the armed struggle led by He Long and others. In July 1929, he was elected a representative of the Sangzhi county soviet and worked in the county's peasant association.

In May 1933, Liao became deputy battalion commander of the Fourth Guerrilla Detachment in Hefeng County, Hubei. In July 1933, he was transferred to the headquarters of the Red Third Army as a clerk and joined the Chinese Communist Party, with He Long and Guan Xiangying as his sponsors. He then served as secretary of the Red Third Army's political department, party committee secretary of its Seventh Division and political commissar of its Ninth Division, and he took part in building the eastern Guizhou soviet area.

In October 1934, after the Second and Sixth Army Groups of the Red Army linked up, Liao became political commissar of the Sixth Division of the Second Army Group. In spring 1935, he became director of the organization department of the Second Army Group's political department, and he twice served as acting political commissar of the Fourth Division. He was wounded in the battle at Dayantang in Li County in August 1935. In November 1935, he set out from Sangzhi on the Long March as political commissar of the Sixth Division. In May 1937, he attended the party's soviet-area representative conference in Yan'an.

== Second Sino-Japanese War ==
After the Second Sino-Japanese War began, Liao became deputy commander and political commissar of the 716th Regiment of the 358th Brigade of the 120th Division of the Eighth Route Army, and he fought at Yanmen Pass and in western Shanxi. In early 1939, he led the division's main force into central Hebei, and that year he became deputy political commissar of the Independent Second Brigade and served as acting brigade commander at the battle of Chenzhuang. He returned as political commissar of the 716th Regiment in 1940 and took part in the Hundred Regiments Offensive.

From 1941 to 1942, Liao studied at military and political academies in Yan'an and at the Central Party School, and he took part in the Rectification Movement. In 1943, he headed the organization and education section of the Central Party School and later became deputy political commissar of the 358th Brigade. In October 1944, he became political commissar of the Fifth Cadre Battalion of the Eighth Route Army's Southern Detachment, and he later served as political commissar of the Third Subdistrict of the Fifth Division of the New Fourth Army and party secretary of the Xiangnan prefecture.

== Chinese Civil War ==
After the Japanese surrender, Liao served as deputy political commissar and then political commissar of the Jianghan Military District, and as party secretary of the Jianghan district. In April 1946, he was assigned to the Beiping Executive Headquarters of the military mediation mission, but he was soon recalled to Yan'an and returned to the Shanxi–Suiyuan front with He Long.

During the Chinese Civil War, Liao became deputy political commissar of the Jinbei Field Army in late 1946, and then political commissar of the First Column of the Jin–Sui Field Army. In March 1947, he became deputy political commissar of the Shaanxi–Gansu–Ningxia Field Army Group and political commissar of the First Column of the Northwest Field Army, and he took part in the defense of Yan'an. In late February 1948, during the Yichuan campaign, his unit blocked the main Nationalist force at Wazi Street, helping to destroy the Nationalist 29th Army. In February 1949, he became political commissar of the PLA's First Army, and after the capture of Qinghai in September 1949, he became chairman of the Qinghai Military and Political Committee.

== People's Republic ==
After the founding of the People's Republic of China, Liao served as political commissar of the First Army and of the Qinghai Military District, deputy secretary of the Qinghai provincial party committee and vice chairman of the Qinghai Provincial People's Government. In 1952, he became director of the political department of the Northwest Military Region, and later its deputy political commissar. In 1954, he was appointed a deputy minister of national defense.

In 1955, Liao studied in the campaign department of the PLA Military Academy, graduating in 1956, and he was awarded the rank of lieutenant general in 1955. He became president of the PLA Military Academy in 1957. From January 1960 to January 1967, he served as political commissar of the Beijing Military Region, third secretary of its party committee and a secretary of the party's North China Bureau. He was an alternate member of the 8th Central Committee.

According to his official biography, Liao was persecuted by Lin Biao and the Gang of Four during the Cultural Revolution, and he was struggled against and detained for about five years. He was released in July 1972 on the personal instructions of Mao Zedong and Zhou Enlai. Xinhua's English-language obituary gave the period of his imprisonment as 1967 to 1973. In December 1973, Liao became political commissar of the PLA Academy of Military Sciences. In February 1975, he was appointed political commissar of the Nanjing Military Region, and in September 1977 he became its first political commissar. He became a member of the Central Military Commission in August 1977. In January 1980, he became first political commissar of the Shenyang Military Region. He was a full member of the 11th and 12th Central Committees. His official biography states that he repeatedly asked to step down from leadership posts.

From 1983 to 1993, Liao served as a vice chairperson of the Standing Committee of the 6th and 7th National People's Congresses. For five years, he also chaired the NPC's Foreign Affairs Committee. He also served as chairman of the Central Patriotic Health Campaign Committee. In September 1986, he led an NPC delegation to Hungary. He was also honorary chairman of the China Association for Cultural Exchange and Cooperation.

== Death ==
Liao died of illness in Beijing at 6:30 a.m. on October 5, 2006, at the age of 94. The state broadcaster CCTV described him as a long-tested and loyal communist, a proletarian revolutionary and an outstanding leader of the PLA's political work.

== Honours ==
- Order of August the First, 1st class
- Order of Independence and Freedom, 1st class
- Order of Liberation, 1st class
- Red Star Medal of Merit, 1st class (1988)
