= Liu Yalou =

Chinese general

- 刘亚楼
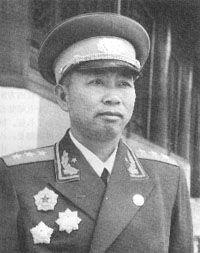

1st Commander of the People's Liberation Army Air Force
- In office 25 October 1949 – 7 May 1965
- Chairman: Mao Zedong
- Preceded by: Post established
- Succeeded by: Wu Faxian

Personal details
- Born: April 1910 Wuping, Fujian, China
- Died: 7 May 1965 (aged 55) Shanghai, China
- Awards: Order of Bayi (First Class Medal); Order of Independence and Freedom (First Class Medal); Order of Liberation (First Class Medal)
- Nickname: 103 (military call sign)

Military service
- Allegiance: China; USSR
- Branch/service: People's Liberation Army Ground Force; People's Liberation Army Air Force
- Years of service: 1929–1965
- Rank: General (PLA); Major (USSR)
- Commands: Chief of Staff, Manchurian Army Group, Chief commander, People's Liberation Army Air Force
- Battles/wars: Soviet-German War; Chinese Civil War; Korean War

Liu Yalou (simplified Chinese: 刘亚楼; traditional Chinese: 劉亞樓; pinyin: Liú Yàlóu, 8 April 1910 – 7 May 1965) was a Chinese general who served as the first commander of the People's Liberation Army Air Force (PLAAF) from 1949 until his death. During the Chinese Civil War, he was chief of staff to Lin Biao and Luo Ronghuan in Northeast China. As commander of the air force, he organised its first aviation schools and units with Soviet help and directed its entry into the Korean War.

== Early life ==
Liu was born on 8 April 1910 in Wuping County, Fujian, and his original name was Liu Zhendong. In 1924, he entered the Xiangdian Higher Primary School, and in 1926, he was admitted to the Fujian Provincial No. 7 Middle School in Changting. He soon left school and returned home to teach at the Chongde Primary School, where, under the guidance of its headmaster, Liu Kemo, he began revolutionary activities. He organised 48 young men into an "Iron and Blood Society" and was chosen to lead a peasant organisation known as the Great Youth Association.

== Military career ==
In August 1929, Liu joined the Chinese Communist Party (CCP), and in September, he joined the Red Army, serving as a squad and platoon leader in a guerrilla unit in western Fujian. In December 1929, he entered the training school of the Fourth Red Army. From 1930, he served as a company commander and as a battalion commander and political commissar in the Red 12th Army, and as political commissar of the 8th Detachment of the 3rd Column of the Fourth Red Army, taking part in battles at Wenjiashi, Changsha and Ji'an. He later served as political commissar of the 35th Regiment of the 12th Division and of the 11th Division, and as director of the political department and political commissar of the 2nd Division of the 1st Red Army Corps, and he took part in the campaigns against the Nationalist encirclement campaigns in the Central Soviet.

During the Long March, which began in October 1934, Liu and the division commander Chen Guang led the 2nd Division as the vanguard, forcing a crossing of the Wu River and capturing Zunyi and Loushan Pass. At the Dadu River, he sent the division's 4th Regiment to seize the Luding Bridge. After the First and Fourth Front Armies of the Red Army met in June 1935, he became commander of the 1st Division of the 1st Red Army Corps and deputy commander of the 2nd Column of the Shaanxi–Gansu Detachment. In northern Shaanxi, he commanded the 2nd Division and took part in the Battle of Zhiluozhen and the Eastern Expedition. In June 1936, he entered the Anti-Japanese Red Army University, and after graduating, he became head of the training department of its successor, the Counter-Japanese Military and Political University.

In January 1938, Liu became the education director of the Counter-Japanese Military and Political University, assisting Luo Ruiqing in organising its teaching. In 1939, he went to the Soviet Union to study at the Frunze Military Academy. After the German invasion of the Soviet Union, he joined the Soviet Army in 1942, and he reached the rank of major. In 1943, he, Lu Dongsheng and Yang Zhicheng were assigned to the 88th Separate Rifle Brigade of the Soviet Far Eastern Military District at Khabarovsk.

In August 1945, after the Soviet Union declared war on Japan, Liu entered Manchuria with the Soviet forces as a staff officer. According to his biographer Zhong Zhaoyun, after a failure of coordination in which Soviet aircraft bombed Soviet ground troops, Liu, who had relayed the relevant order, was sentenced to death but was spared after an investigation. After Japan's surrender, he remained with the Soviet forces in China as a liaison officer between the Soviet army and the Eighth Route Army.

=== Second-half of the Chinese Civil War ===
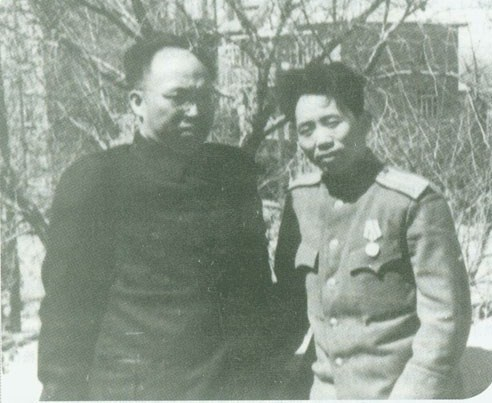
Liu, in the uniform of a Soviet major, with Luo Ronghuan in Dalian, 1946

Using the name Major Wang Song, Liu worked in the political department of the Soviet forces in the Port Arthur–Dalian area and served in practice as a liaison officer between the Soviet authorities and the CCP. He asked Han Guang, the CCP secretary of Dalian, to help him contact the party leadership, and after the CCP's Northeast Bureau agreed to his return, Han took him to meet Luo Ronghuan, who was in Dalian for medical treatment in the spring of 1946. On Luo's recommendation, the party appointed Liu chief of staff of the Northeast Democratic United Army in May 1946. He also became principal of the army's aviation school, a post that the American analyst Kenneth Allen dates to October 1947. As chief of staff, Liu strengthened the army's headquarters, ran a training course for staff officers, translated the Soviet Red Army's regulations on staff work and set up a surveying school to train map-makers. He helped direct the campaigns known as the Three Expeditions South and Four Defences of Linjiang and the offensives of the summer, autumn and winter of 1947. From 28 June 1947, the army's documents were issued jointly in the names of Lin Biao, Luo Ronghuan and Liu.

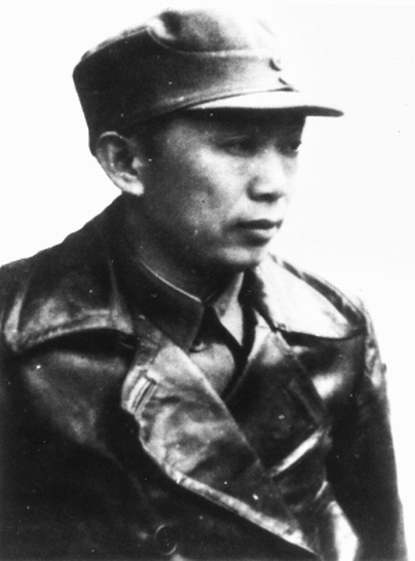
Liu in Northeast China during the Civil War

In January 1948, Liu became chief of staff of the Northeast Field Army and the Northeast Military Region, and in June, he became a member of the CCP's Northeast Bureau. He helped Lin Biao and Luo Ronghuan plan and carry out the Liaoshen campaign. During the Pingjin campaign, he was commander of the Tianjin front, leading about 340,000 troops. The Central Military Commission had allowed three days for the attack on Tianjin, but Liu's forces took the city in 29 hours in January 1949, destroying about 130,000 defenders and capturing the Nationalist commander Chen Changjie.

In March 1949, Liu became chief of staff of the Fourth Field Army, and in April, he became commander of its 14th Army Group and a member of the CCP's Central China Bureau. The 14th Army Group later became the core of the new air force.

== Commander of the Air Force ==
On 11 July 1949, Mao Zedong met Liu in Zhongnanhai and assigned him to command the planned air force. Liu at first declined, saying that he had studied ground warfare and not air warfare, but Mao did not change his decision. At the end of July 1949, Liu travelled to the Soviet Union to negotiate aid for the air force, and after three rounds of talks with the Soviet Air Force commander Konstantin Vershinin, he signed an agreement that closely followed Mao's plan. With Soviet help, he set up six flight schools in less than half a year and acquired more than 400 aircraft from the Soviet Union.

On 25 October 1949, Liu was appointed the first commander of the PLAAF, and its headquarters was formally established on 11 November. He was 39 years old. He and the next three commanders of the air force, who served until 1985, were all ground force officers.

=== Korean War ===
The air force's first unit, the 4th Composite Brigade, was formed in Nanjing in June 1950, and following Mao's instruction to "build while fighting", Liu helped organise the air force of the People's Volunteer Army for the Korean War. The air force entered the war in November 1950. Liu's guiding principle for the new force was to "temper itself in air combat and grow up in battle".

=== Development ===
Liu drew up the "one area, several layers, four-four formation" tactical principle for air units. He also set out guidelines for flight training, oversaw the writing of the air force's first regulations, manuals and training programmes, and led the establishment of 29 colleges and schools, including the Air Force Academy and the Air Force Engineering College. He was known for strict discipline, inspecting quarters with white gloves and demanding precise briefings from his staff, and he was nicknamed "Thunder Lord". According to Global People, when he refused to reassign the air force's Russian-language translators after the Sino-Soviet split, Mao criticised him and did not speak to him for several months, but Mao later said that the air force could be left to Liu.

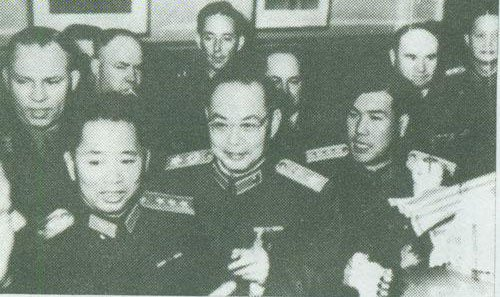
Ye Jianying and Liu in the Soviet Union, 1957

In 1955, Liu was made a general. He was a deputy to the 1st National People's Congress in 1954, a member of the first three National Defence Councils and, from November 1956, a member of the Central Military Commission. He was also a member of the 8th Central Committee. In 1959, he became a deputy Minister of National Defence, and he later served as director of the ministry's Fifth Academy, and as deputy director of the National Defense Science and Technology Commission. In 1964, he became honorary chairman of the China Aero Sports Association.

== Illness and death ==
In September 1964, after returning from a visit abroad, Liu was found to have liver cancer. He was treated in Shanghai, and he died there on 7 May 1965 at the age of 55. Wu Faxian succeeded him as commander of the air force in May 1965.

Before the Cultural Revolution, during the campaign against Luo Ruiqing, Ye Qun claimed that Luo had used Liu to pass on four points to the air force, including that Lin Biao was in poor health and need not be consulted, and Wu Faxian wrote to Lin in December 1965 that Liu had warned him before his death not to be deceived by Luo. Because Liu was dead and could not confirm or deny the claims, they were used against Luo. After the Cultural Revolution, the General Political Department of the PLA confirmed that Liu had left no such last words.

== Personal life ==
At the end of 1946, Liu met Zhai Yunying, a primary school teacher of mixed Chinese and Russian descent, and they married in 1947. They had a son and two daughters.

Military offices
New title Air Force founded	Commander of the People's Liberation Army Air Force; 1949–1965	Succeeded by Wu Faxian
