= People's Revolutionary Military Commission =

Chinese military body

People's Revolutionary Military Commission of the Central People's Government
- 中央人民政府人民革命军事委员会
- National emblem of China

Commission overview
- Formed: 1 October 1949
- Dissolved: 27 September 1954
- Superseding Commission: National Defense Commission

People's Revolutionary Military Commission
- Simplified Chinese: 中央人民政府人民革命军事委员会
- Traditional Chinese: 中央人民政府人民革命軍事委員會
- Literal meaning: Central People's Government People's Revolutionary Military Commission
Transcriptions
Standard Mandarin
- Hanyu Pinyin: Zhōngyāng rénmín zhèngfǔ rénmín gémìng jūnshì wěiyuánhuì

The People's Revolutionary Military Commission of the Central People's Government was the supreme military authority of the People's Republic of China from 1 October 1949 to 27 September 1954. Mao Zedong, the chairman of the Central People's Government, concurrently served as the chairman of the commission.

When the People's Revolutionary Military Commission existed, there was no separate supreme military leadership organ of the Chinese Communist Party (CCP). This differs from the later situation where the Central Military Commission of the CCP and the National Defense Commission coexisted, and still later, the Central Military Commission of the CCP and the State Central Military Commission coexisted.

== History ==
The People's Revolutionary Military Commission was established in 1949, concurrent with the establishment of the People's Republic of China. In 1954, as the CCP Central Military Commission was re-established, while state military authority was transferred into the National Defense Council chaired by the chairman of China in keeping with the 1954 Constitution.

== Organization ==
The Central People's Government's People's Revolutionary Military Commission adopted a mixed leadership system, and its subordinate business units were divided into two categories:

- Departments directly under the Central Military Commission: successively including the Operations Department, Intelligence Department, Technical Department, Liaison Department, Military Training Department, Military School Management Department, Communications Department, People's Armed Forces Department, Military Affairs Department, Ordnance Department, Military Construction Department, Finance Department, Civil Aviation Administration, Meteorological Bureau, Military Transportation Command, etc. The official name of all of them is "Department (Bureau) of the Central People's Government People's Revolutionary Military Commission". The work of all departments directly under the Central Military Commission is directly led and coordinated by the chief of the General Staff and deputy chiefs of the General Staff of the Central People's Government People's Revolutionary Military Commission.
- The headquarters with subordinate secondary departments are:
  - General Political Department: Established with the Central Military Commission.
  - General Cadre Management Department: Established with the Central Military Commission.
  - General Logistics Department: established with the Military Commission. In September 1951, the Ordnance Department under the General Logistics Department was changed to be directly under the Military Commission, in charge of the ordnance work of the whole army. On January 26, 1954, the Finance Department under the General Logistics Department was changed to be directly under the Military Commission.
  - General Intelligence Department: Established on December 10, 1950, the original Intelligence Department, Technical Department and Liaison Department directly under the Military Commission were changed into second-level departments under the General Intelligence Department.
- The Central Military Commission Ordnance Industry Committee (hereinafter referred to as the Central Ordnance Industry Committee): Established in January 1951 with the approval of the Central Committee of the Chinese Communist Party. Premier Zhou Enlai served concurrently as chairman, with acting chief of the General Staff Nie Rongzhen and Li Fuchun, vice chairman of the Central Financial and Economic Committee, serving as vice chairmen. Nine members were appointed: Air Force Commander Liu Yalou, Navy Commander Xiao Jingguang, Armored Forces Commander Xu Guangda, Artillery Commander Chen Xilian, General Logistics Department Minister Yang Lisan, acting minister of heavy industry He Changgong, director of the Ordnance Industry Office Liu Ding, Li Tao, and Song Shaowen. Lei Yingfu served as secretary-general. The establishment of the Central Military Commission Ordnance Industry Committee changed the previous situation where the weapons industry was managed separately by various administrative regions. In April 1951, the 80th meeting of the State Council decided to establish the Ordnance Bureau (formerly the Ordnance Industry Office) under the Ministry of Heavy Industry to unify the management of the national weapons industry and be under the leadership of the Central Military Commission Ordnance Industry Committee. Liu Ding concurrently served as director of the bureau. The Ordnance Commission was responsible for determining the guidelines and principles for ordnance development, while the Ordnance Bureau of the Ministry of Heavy Industry was responsible for organizing the production of military weapons and equipment.
- Aviation Industry Management Committee: To strengthen leadership over the development of the aviation industry, on April 17, 1951, the Central People's Government Revolutionary Military Commission and the State Council issued the "Decision on the Development of the Aviation Industry," establishing the Aviation Industry Management Committee, which was placed under the leadership of the Military Commission. Nie Rongzhen, Li Fuchun, Liu Yalou, He Changgong, Duan Zijun, and Ma Wen were appointed as members. Nie Rongzhen served as the director, and Li Fuchun as the deputy director.

From 1954 to 1955, the “Central Military Commission – General Headquarters – Second-level Department” system was gradually established. Among the departments that were originally directly under the Central Military Commission, except for the Ordnance Department and the Finance Department which were upgraded to the General Ordnance Department of the Chinese People’s Liberation Army and the General Finance Department of the Chinese People’s Liberation Army respectively, most of the others became second-level departments of the General Staff Department of the Chinese People’s Liberation Army, and their names were changed to “XX Department of the General Staff Department of the Chinese People’s Liberation Army”.
