= Anti-Japanese Military and Political University =

Chinese Communist Party military academy

Coordinates: 36°36′15″N 109°29′35″E

- 中国人民抗日军事政治大学
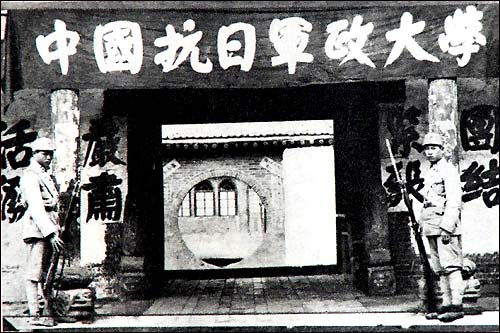
- Gate of the Anti-Japanese Military and Political University with motto.
- Motto: 团结、紧张、严肃、活泼
- Motto in English: Togetherness, alertness, seriousness, liveliness
- Type: Public
- Active: 1931–1945
- Affiliations: CPC Central Committee of the Board of Education
- President: Lin Biao (1937-1943); Xu Xiangqian (1943-1945)
- Location: Yan'an, Shaanxi, China

Anti-Japanese Military and Political University
- Traditional Chinese: 中國人民抗日軍事政治大學
- Simplified Chinese: 中国人民抗日军事政治大学
- Literal meaning: Chinese People's Anti-Japan Military–Political University
Transcriptions
Standard Mandarin
- Hanyu Pinyin: Zhōngguó rénmín kàng Rì Jūnshì Zhèngzhì Dàxué

Kangri Junzheng University
- Traditional Chinese: 抗日軍政大學
- Simplified Chinese: 抗日军政大学
Transcriptions
Standard Mandarin
- Hanyu Pinyin: Kàngrì Jūn Zhèng Dàxué

Kangda
- Chinese: 抗大
Transcriptions
Standard Mandarin
- Hanyu Pinyin: Kàngdà

The Anti-Japanese Military and Political University, also commonly known as Kàngdà (抗大) and Kangri Junzheng University (抗日军政大学), was a military academy located in Yan'an, Shaanxi, the headquarters of the Chinese Communist Party during the Second Sino-Japanese War. Its former site has been converted to a memorial hall.

== History ==
The Anti-Japanese Military and Political University was founded in 1931 in Ruijin, Jiangxi, capital of Jiangxi Soviet, it was initially called China Red Army School (中国红军学校) and then extended to a college named China Red Army College (中国红军大学) in 1933. During the fifth counter-campaign against "encirclement and suppression" in 1934, the college relocated to Wayaobu Town of Anding County in northwest China's Shaanxi province (Shaanbei), formed China Workers' and Peasants' Red Army School (中国工农红军学校) by the merger of Shanbei Red Army School (陕北红军学校) and later changed the name to Xibei Anti-Japanese University of the Red Army (西北抗日红军大学) in 1936. Zhou Kun was its president and Yuan Guoping was political commissar. On January 20, 1937, it was renamed "Anti-Japanese University of the Red Army" (中国人民抗日红军大学). Lin Biao was its president, Liu Bocheng was vice-president, and Mao Zedong was its chairman of the Board of Education. In March 1943, Xu Xiangqian succeed Lin Biao as the president. After the establishment of the People's Republic of China, the university was merged into PLA National Defence University.

== Culture ==
- Motto: 团结、紧张、严肃、活泼; 'Be United', 'Alert', 'Earnest and Lively'
- University Song: Song of the Military University (军校之歌)

== Presidents ==
No.	Portrait	Name	Took office	Left office	Ref
1		Lin Biao	1937	1943	
2		Xu Xiangqian	1943	1945	

== Notable alumni ==
- Chen Geng
- Feng Yuhe
- Geng Biao
- Guo Shusheng
- He Changgong
- He Jinnian
- Hu Yaobang
- Hu Zhuting
- Lai Chuanzhu
- Li Tao
- Li Xiannian
- Liu Huinong
- Liu Xiping
- Liu Yalou
- Luo Binghui
- Luo Huasheng
- Luo Ronghuan
- Mo Wenhua
- Peng Xuefeng
- Qi Xin
- Shao Shiping
- Su Zhenhua
- Tan Guansan
- Tan Zheng
- Wang Weizhou
- Wang Jian'an
- Wang Ping
- Xi Henghan
- Xiang Xuan
- Xiao Wenjiu
- Xu Shiyou
- Yang Chengwu
- Yang Dezhi
- Yang Lisan
- Yao Jiming
- Zeng Xisheng
- Zhang Aiping
- Zhang Chunqing
- Zhang Jingwu
- Zhao Erlu
- Zhou Chunquan
- Zhou Jianping
- Zhou Wenlong
- Zhou Zikun

== Notable faculty ==
- Ai Siqi
- Du Pingzhai
- Feng Dafei
- Feng Zhiguo
- Guo Huaruo
- Han Zhenji
- Li Dongchao
- Liao Guanxian
- Liu Shaoqing
- Luo Shiwen
- Ren Baige
- Xu Maoyong
- Yang Lanshi
- Zhang Qingfu
- Zhang Ruxin
- Zhang Wenhua
- Zhao Shouyi

== See also ==
- Kàngrì (抗日)
