= Wang Shusheng =

Chinese general (1905–1974)

Wang Shusheng 王树声
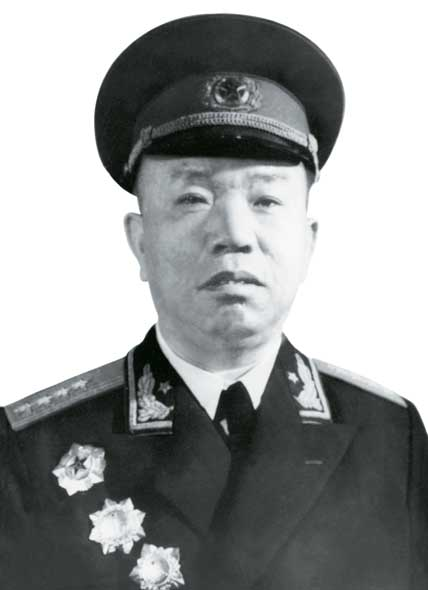
- Born: Wang Hongxin; 26 May 1905
- Died: 7 January 1974 (aged 68)
- Military career
- Allegiance: Chinese Communist Party
- Rank: General
- Commands: Central Plains Military District
- Awards: Order of Bayi (First Class Medal); Order of Independence and Freedom (First Class Medal); Order of Liberation (First Class Medal)

Wang Shusheng (Note: Chinese: 王树声; pinyin: Wáng Shùshēng; Wade–Giles: Wang Shu-shêng) (May 26, 1905 – January 7, 1974) was a Chinese general, strategist, revolutionary and one of the pioneers of Chinese ordnance and military sciences construction. In 1955 Wang became one of the ten Da Jiang (Generals of the Army) of the People's Liberation Army. He was born into a landlord family but became a major leader of the peasant movement. He experienced many significant battles during the China's turbulent years such as the Second Sino-Japanese War and the Chinese Civil War.

Wang joined the Chinese Communist Party in 1926 and led peasant movements in districts and counties. Before that, he was a primary school headmaster. Then Wang started his military career during the Huangma Uprising, establishing the Northeast Hubei Base. Next, Wang took part in the Long March. After the foundation of new China, he took charge of the Vice Commander of Hubei Military District. In 1955 Wang was promoted to four-star general. Wang started his career as a primary school headmaster. During the fire of the revolution and many battles, he followed the footsteps of General Xu Xiangqian. He broadened the small and weak Chinese Red Army into a 100,000-soldier force. And then he served as a chief commander.

He had several brushes with death, and he became the only survivor of his 13 brothers and sisters who joined the revolution. He had affiliation with Xu Xiangqian, Li Xiannian, Xu Shiyou, Wang Hongkun, etc.

He had three sons and a daughter.

== Family ==
On 26 May 1905, Wang was born in a village in Macheng Hubei Province. His original name was Wang Hongxin. He had three brothers and a sister. Wang was born to a small landlord family, whose fortunes gradually declined after his father's death when he was 6, and his mother's three years later.

== Long March ==
In 1935, the Long March started. Wang launched the Tumen Battle. He protected the main forces across the Ming River and met with the Red Army in Maogong. Later, due to command confusion and supply shortage, the west road army lost continuously, suffering heavy damage.

== Second Sino-Japanese War ==
After the Second Sino-Japanese War broke out, Wang Shusheng was chosen to be the deputy commander. During the time in Yan'an, Wang Shusheng married a military doctor named Yang Ju. They had three sons and a daughter.

== Chinese Civil War ==
During the Chinese Civil War, he was the Central Military Region deputy commander, the northwest military region commander and political commissar, E Yu Military Region commander. During the second civil war, he was ordered to lead the force to Tongbai Mountain. There, they met with the fifth division of the New Fourth Army, and formed the Central Plains Military District. In the June 1946, he assisted Li Xiannian to command the military district and led the left army across from Guangshui to Pinghan Railway, then went forwards to Wudang Mountain. In Wudang Mountain, he established the Northwest Base. In July 1947, under his leadership, the second field army went into the Dabie Mountains successfully.

== After the PRC ==
Wang Shusheng did not cease to contribute to the PLA in peacetime. In 1954 the Central Military Commission appointed Wang as the minister of The General Ordnance, which aimed at research and development of modern weapons corresponding to the modernization drive of the PLA. Wang also served as the vice-minister of Defence in 1959. In 1955, Wang was made a general.

Wang Shusheng died of advanced esophageal cancer in Beijing on 7 January 1974.
