= Anhui Military District =

- 中国人民解放军安徽省军区
- Founded: December 1951; 73 years ago
- Country: People's Republic of China
- Allegiance: Chinese Communist Party
- Type: Military district
- Role: Command and control
- Part of: People's Liberation Army
- Headquarters: Hefei, Anhui

Commanders
- Commander: Major general (shaojiang) Shi Shuhe
- Political Commisar: Major general (shaojiang) Liu Guobin

Chinese name
- Simplified Chinese: 中国人民解放军安徽省军区
- Traditional Chinese: 中國人民解放軍雲南省軍區
Transcriptions
Standard Mandarin
- Hanyu Pinyin: Zhōngguó Rénmín Jiěfàngjūn ānhuīshěng Jūnqū

The Anhui Military District (Chinese: 中国人民解放军安徽省军区; full name People's Liberation Army Anhui Military District or PLA Anhui Military District) is a military district of the National Defense Mobilization Department of the Central Military Commission in China.

== History ==
Anhui Military District was established in December 1951, under the jurisdiction of the East China Military Region of the People's Liberation Army.

== Leaders ==
=== Commanders ===
Name (English)	Name (Chinese)	Tenure begins	Tenure ends	Note
Liu Fei	刘飞	January 1952	January 1955	
Liao Rongbiao	廖容标	September 1955	October 1965	
Yan Guang	严光	October 1965	November 1967	
Li Desheng	李德生	November 1967	December 1974	
Yu Guangmao	余光茂	August 1975	May 1983	
Jiu Dehe	酒德和	May 1983	August 1985	
Li Yuanxi	李元喜	August 1985	June 1990	
Shen Shanwen	沈善文	June 1990	September 1999	
Zhong Minghui	种明辉	September 1999	October 2002	
Wang Hewen	王贺文	October 2002	June 2005	
Xu Yuanchao	许援朝	June 2005	May 2009	
Meng Zhaobin	孟昭斌	May 2009	April 2010	
Xu Wei	许伟	April 2010	December 2013	
Yu Tianming	于天明	December 2013	August 2017	
Yang Zheng	杨征	August 2017	December 2019	
Liu Xiaohua	刘孝华	December 2019	April 2023	
Shi Shuhe	史树合	April 2023		

=== Political commissars ===
Name (English)	Name (Chinese)	Tenure begins	Tenure ends	Note
Zeng Xisheng	曾希圣	January 1952	June 1962	First Political Commissar
Niu Shucai	牛树才	January 1952	August 1954	Second Political Commissar
Li Shiyan	李世焱	February 1956	August 1965	Second Political Commissar
Li Baohua	李葆华	June 1962	June 1971	First Political Commissar
Wang Wenmu	王文模	April 1964	October 1978	Third Political Commissar
Wang Wenmu	王文模	October 1978	May 1983	Second Political Commissar
Song Wen	宋文	October 1965	1967	Second Political Commissar
Zhang Wenbi	张文碧	November 1967	August 1972	
Zhong Guochu	钟国楚	March 1969	April 1970	Second Political Commissar
Liang Jiqing	梁辑卿	April 1970	October 1978	Second Political Commissar
Zhang Chunsen	张春森	January 1971	May 1977	Fourth Political Commissar
Song Peizhang	宋佩璋	January 1971	June 1977	First Political Commissar
Wan Li	万里	June 1977	June 1980	First Political Commissar
Liu Yaozu	刘耀祖	October 1978	May 1983	
Zhang Jingfu	张劲夫	June 1980	May 1983	First Political Commissar
Xiong Yukun	熊玉坤	July 1981	May 1983	
Zhou Zijian	周子健	May 1983	May 1983	
Huang Huang	黄璜	May 1983	December 1986	First Political Commissar
Zhang Linyuan	张林元	May 1983	April 1987	
Shi Lei	石磊	April 1987	June 1992	
Chen Peisen	陈培森	June 1992	1996	
Hu Daoren	胡道仁	1996	2000	
Dai Changyou	戴长友	2000	July 2003	
Zhang Jinrong	张金荣	July 2003	April 2008	
Wen Kezhi	文可芝	April 2008	July 2011	
Song Haihang	宋海航	July 2011	July 2015	
Dai Yong	戴勇	July 2015	July 2020	
Wang Guisheng	王贵胜	July 2020	November 2023	
Liu Guobin	刘国宾	November 2023		
