= Li Mingyang =

Chinese general

- 李明扬
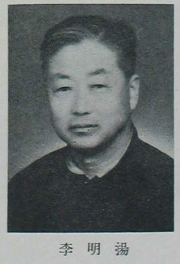
- Born: 27 February 1891
- Died: 17 November 1978 (aged 87)
- Other names: Li Minlai (李敏来); Li Xunwu (李逊吾); Li Shiguang (李师广)
- Occupation: Military officer

Chinese name
- Traditional Chinese: 李明揚
- Simplified Chinese: 李明扬
Transcriptions
Standard Mandarin
- Hanyu Pinyin: lǐ míng yáng
- Wade–Giles: li ming yang

Li Mingyang (simplified Chinese: 李明扬; traditional Chinese: 李明揚, 27 February 1891 – 17 November 1978), formerly known as Li Minlai or Li Xunwu, was a lieutenant general of the National Revolutionary Army. During the Second Sino-Japanese War, he was the commander-in-chief of the guerrilla operations in the 5th Military Region. In 1949, he and his forces defected to join the People's Liberation Army.

== Early life and career ==
On 27 February 1891, Li was born in Xiao County of Anhui Province. From 1907 to 1911, he studied in military schools the Qing Government set up for the New Army. After the outbreak of the Wuchang Uprising, he went to Hubei to join the Xinhai Revolution, and was sent to Jiujiang to serve as a naval trainee. Later, he became a staff officer under Li Liejun, the Military Governor of Jiangxi.

In the fall of 1912, Li served as the Commandant of the Hukou Fortress. He also joined the revolutionary organization Tongmenghui in the same year. After the end of the Second Revolution, which saw Yuan Shikai consolidate his power, Li went into exile in Japan in 1913. In the following year, he moved to Germany and enrolled in Humboldt University of Berlin to study military courses. In 1915, Li returned to China and once again served under Li Liejun. He participated in the National Protection War as the Senior Staff Officer of the 2nd Army.

In 1924, Li served as the Commanding Officer of the Jiangxi Army in Guangdong, stationed on the outskirts of Guangzhou. During this period, he got to know Zhou Enlai, the then Director of the Political Department at Whampoa Military Academy. In 1926, Li participated in the Northern Expedition as the Deputy Commander of the 9th Division of the 3rd Army as well as the Commander of the 26th Regiment. Following the capture of Nanchang on 7 November, he was promoted to the Commander of the 9th Division. In March 1927, Li received an order from Chiang Kai-shek to arrest 14 individuals under his command who were affiliated with Chinese Communist Party. Li refused to carried out the order and secretly assisted the individuals in escaping to Jiujiang. In June 1928, he was relieved of his duties and subsequently resided in Nanking.

In 1930, Li was appointed Director of the Jiangsu Provincial Security Department upon the recommendation of Gu Zhutong, Chairman of the Jiangsu Provincial Government. He was dismissed from the position in 1932 and later established the Renhe Pharmaceutical Factory.

== Second Sino-Japanese War ==
During the Second Sino-Japanese War, Li was appointed as the Commander-in-Chief of guerilla forces in the 5th Military Region. Following the Battle of Xuzhou, he led his forces to retreat to Huaiyin. Han Deqin, then acting Chairman of the Jiangsu Provincial Government, saw Li as a threat to his control of northern Jiangsu, but was forced to accept Li under order from Li Zongren, the Commander-in-Chief of the 5th Military Region. Li Mingyang was directed to Taizhou, where he stationed his troops and recruited local armed forces. Around this time, he cooperated with the communist-led New Fourth Army on several occasions, including the transportation of military supplies from Wang Jingjiu and the transfer of intelligence from Nanking.

In October 1940, several armed conflicts broke out between the New Fourth Army and the 89th Army of the National Revolutionary Army under Han Deqin. During the battle, Li's troops refrained from engaging in combat, instead passively witnessed the annihilation of Han's forces. Commander of the New Fourth Army Chen Yi later remarked that had Li intervened, the New Fourth Army might have been forced to retreat across the Yangtze River. On 31 October, Li met Chen Yi and Wu Faxian in a conference held in Qutang, where he agreed to cooperate with the New Fourth Army in future battles against the Imperial Japanese Army.

In February 1941, as Japanese forces advanced toward Taizhou, Li retreated into rural areas of central Jiangsu to continue guerrilla campaign against the Japanese. On 6 June of the same year, Japanese military had Li surrounded in Wujiaze of Xinghua. With reinforcements from his subordinate officer Chen Zhongzhu, Li managed to break out of the encirclement. In the summer of 1943, Han Deqin withdrew from northern Jiangsu and retreated to Fuyang, Anhui. In December of the same year, Military Affairs Commission of the Nationalist government appointed Li as the Deputy Commander-in-Chief of the Shandong-Jiangsu Military Region.

On 28 May 1945, Li was captured by Japanese forces while traveling by boat near Tangdian Village in Taizhou. He was first taken to Yangzhou, then transferred to a Japanese military facility in Shanghai. He was eventually released in July 1945 through negotiations involving his acquaintances within the Wang Jingwei regime. Following the Japanese surrender in August 1945, Li traveled to Nanjing to attend the surrender ceremony.

== Post-war years ==
In early 1946, Li went to Chongqing to meet with Chiang Kai-shek. However, due to prior accusations made by Han Deqin, Li was placed under house arrest upon arrival. He was ultimately spared formal charges after intercession from prominent figures such as Li Liejun, Shao Lizi and Zhang Zhizhong.

After the war, Li left the military and served as the chairman and general manager of the Yangzi Timber Factory in Shanghai. In 1949, the acting President Li Zongren appointed him as a national policy adviser. Under the president's order, he led a delegation of the Nationalist government to Yangzhou to negotiate with the commanders of the Third Field Army Su Yu and Chen Yi. When negotiations failed to come to a resolution, Li led his troops to defect to the communist side.

Following the foundation of the People's Republic of China, Li became a member of the National Committee of the Chinese People's Political Consultative Conference. In 1954, Li joined the Revolutionary Committee of the Chinese Kuomintang.

On 17 November 1978, Li died of illness in Beijing.
