= Deng Zhaoxiang =

Chinese politician

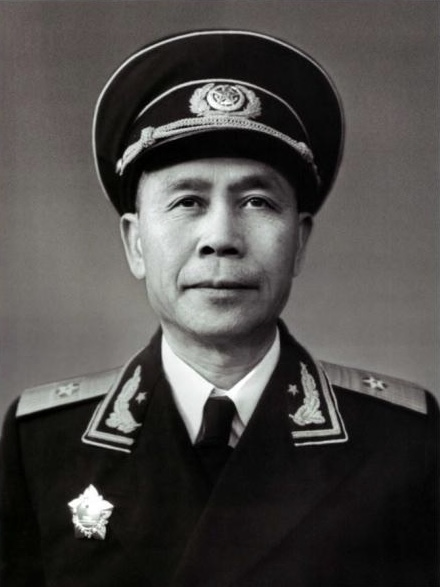
Deng Zhaoxiang

Deng Zhaoxiang (Chinese: 邓兆祥; April, 1903 – August 6, 1998) was a Chinese naval officer, who served as a naval commander under both the Republic of China and the People's Republic of China. After his retirement, he became Vice Chairman of the Chinese People's Political Consultative Conference.

== Life ==
Born in Gaoyao, Guangdong, Deng Zhaoxiang successively studied in Wusong Naval Academy, Yantai Naval Academy, Nanjing Naval Torpedo Gun School and other naval schools. After graduating, he served in the Fourth Fleet of the Guangdong Navy and served as deputy department chief, department chief, deputy captain, and captain. In 1930, he went to study in the United Kingdom, at the Royal Naval College, Greenwich and the British Naval Torpedo School.

After returning to China in 1934, he served successively as commander of a naval torpedo unit, staff officer at the second naval fleet command, and director of training at the Guizhou Tongzi Naval Academy. In 1945, he served as the captain of the Changzhi warship, and in 1948 as the captain of the largest cruiser Chongqing of the Republic of China Navy.

In February 1949, the crew of the Chongqing mutinied, with Deng originally being against the mutiny, but quickly relented, and the ship defected to the side of the Chinese Communist Party (CCP). He was appointed by Mao Zedong as the captain of the cruiser Chongqing of the People's Liberation Army Navy, as well as principal of the Andong Naval School.

After the founding of the People's Republic of China, Deng Zhaoxiang served as the principal of Qingdao Naval Speedboat School in 1950. The Kung Sheung Daily News reported in November 1951 that "under Soviet direction, the Chinese Communists have placed the Central and South China Navy under Deng's command." In 1954, he was elected as a deputy to the first National People's Congress. In 1955, he served as the vice principal of the First Naval Academy and was awarded the rank of Rear Admiral in the same year.

In 1956, he became deputy chief of staff of the Qingdao Base Command of the Navy, and was promoted to the deputy commander of the base the following year. In 1960, he served as deputy commander of the North Sea Fleet.

Accepted as a member of the CCP in 1965.

Eventually rose to deputy commander of the entire People's Liberation Army Navy. He retired in 1985 and served as Vice Chairman of the National Committee of the Chinese People's Political Consultative Conference.

In 1988, he was awarded the Medal of Merit of the Chinese People's Liberation Army.

He died in Beijing on August 6, 1998.
