= Sun Weiru =

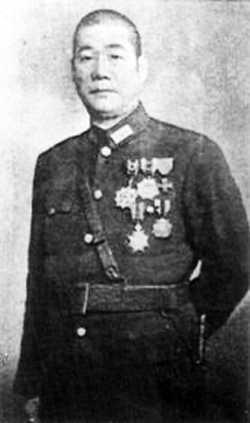
- Born: 1896; Shaanxi, China
- Died: 27 July 1979 (aged 82–83); Xi'an, People's Republic of China
- Military career
- Allegiance: Republic of China
- Branch: (Republic of China (1912–1949)) National Revolutionary Army
- Service years: 1917–1949
- Conflicts: Northern Expedition; Central Plains War; Second Sino-Japanese War

Sun Weiru (traditional Chinese: 孫蔚如; simplified Chinese: 孙蔚如; 1896 – 27 July 1979), given name Shutang (樹棠) was a KMT general from Chang'an County (modern-day Chang'an District, Xi'an), Shaanxi.

== Military career ==
Sun Weiru joined the National Revolutionary Army in 1917. From 1922, he joined the army of General Yang Hucheng. He participated in the Northern Expedition of the National Revolutionary Army, and the Central Plains War.

From 1932, he became the army corps commander of the 32ed army corps. In 1936, he became the Lieutenant General. This rank deemed him to be the second in-command of the Northwest Army. In the Xi'an Incident, he tried his best to resolve the incident peacefully. After that he was the Chairman of Shaanxi province for a short time.

During World War II, he became the General-in-Chief of the 4th Group Army, and also held many other important military positions. He led his troops fought at the Baoding, Xi Kou, and Mountain of Zhong Tiao. In a series of Campaigns around Mountain of Zhong Tiao.

From 1938 to the end of World War II, with inferior weapons, comparable numbers, but superior tactics, he successfully stopped the Japanese army who had much more superior weapons during his battles in Northwest China, and is therefore considered one of the most important Generals who defended Northwest China from the Japanese armies in World War II.

After World War II, he resigned from the military position and did not involve himself in the Chinese Civil War from 1945 to 1949.

== Later life ==
After the establishment of the People's Republic of China, he worked as the vice Governor of Shaanxi province and other administrative positions. He died in Xi'an on July 27, 1979.
