= Liu Fei (general) =

Military officer of the People's Republic of China

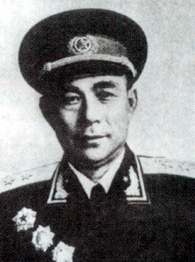
- Liu Fei
- Born: December 29, 1905; Hong'an County, Hubei
- Died: October 24, 1984
- Allegiance: People's Republic of China
- Service / branch: Chinese Workers' and Peasants' Red Army; New Fourth Army; People's Liberation Army
- Rank: lieutenant general
- Battles / wars: Chinese Civil War; Second Sino-Japanese War

Liu Fei (Chinese: 刘飞) (December 29, 1905 – October 24, 1984) was a People's Liberation Army lieutenant general. He was born in Hong'an County, Hubei Province. He was a platoon and then company commander in the Chinese Workers' and Peasants' Red Army before being a regimental commander in the New Fourth Army.

Military offices
New title	Commander of the Anhui Military District; 1952–1955	Succeeded by Liao Rongbiao
