= Li Da (general) =

- 李达
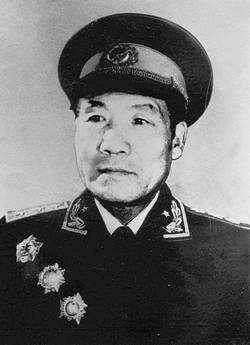

Deputy Chief of PLA General Staff
- In office 21 October 1972 – 11 January 1980
- Chairman: Mao Zedong

Personal details
- Born: April 19, 1905 Mei County, Shaanxi, Qing Empire
- Died: July 12, 1993 (aged 88) Beijing
- Party: Chinese Communist Party

Military service
- Allegiance: People's Republic of China
- Branch/service: People's Liberation Army
- Years of service: 1930–1993
- Rank: General
- Commands: Fifth Army Group, Eight Route Army
- Battles/wars: Encirclement Campaigns, Long March, 2nd Sino-Japanese War, Chinese Civil War

Li Da (simplified Chinese: 李达; traditional Chinese: 李達; pinyin: Lǐ Dá; April 19, 1905 – July 12, 1993) was a general in the People's Liberation Army of China, former deputy of the PLA General Staff, as well as being an adviser to the Central Military Commission.

== Biography ==
=== Early life ===
Xiao was born in Mei County, Shaanxi Province of China.

He joined the Sixth Army Group and participated the Encirclement Campaigns in the 1930s. He joined the Chinese Communist Party in 1932 and participated in the Long March. He went to Jinggangshan and was recruited to the Red Fourth Army.

=== Military career ===
Between 1930 and 1933, he was appointed as first to command of the Third Army, and later Second Army Group, and later the Eighth Route Army, fighting in many battles consisting of the Nationalist Encirclement Campaigns till the Chinese Civil War.

He was a member of the National Defense Commission that sat between 1965 and 1975. He was a member of the Standing Committee of the National People's Congress from January 1965 to March 1978 and was a member of the Central Committee of the Chinese Communist Party from August 1973 to September 1982. He was a deputy chief of staff of the People's Liberation Army from November 1972 to March 1980. Between March 1980 and July 1993 he was an advisor to the Central Military Affairs Commission and from September 1982 to September 1985 he was a member of the Central Advisory Commission.

He died in Beijing on July 12, 1993.
