= Dong Qiwu =

Chinese general and politician

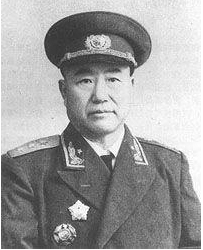
General Dong Qiwu

Dong Qiwu (Chinese: 董其武; pinyin: Dǒng Qíwǔ; November 27, 1899 – March 3, 1989) was a general in the People's Liberation Army of China.

Dong was born in Hejin, Shanxi Province. He attended the military study group founded by Yan Xishan in 1919. He joined the army in 1924. He first was recruited in Liu Zhenghua's army, and later joined National People's Revolution Army, and participated in North Expedition. After that, he joined Fu Zuoyi's army. Since 1918, he actively fought Japanese, and such battles in the Great Wall, Bailingmiao established his reputation. He was promoted to lieutenant general and head of the 102th Division in 1937, and fought in Pingxingguan battle. In 1946, he became the governor and commander of Suiyuan Province, and later became vice commander of northwest military and political official bureau. On September 19, 1949, he announced peaceful liberation of Suiyuan Province. He participated in Korean War, and was the commander of 23 army group of Chinese People's Volunteer Army. He became head of 69 army of PLA in 1953.

He was a delegate to 1st–5th National People's Congress, and a member of standing committee of 4th and 5th NPC. A member of 1st, 3rd, 4th, 5th and 6th National Political Consultative Conference, and vice chairman of 5th and 6th NPCC. He served as a member of 1st–3rd National Defense Commission.

He was made a general in 1955.

He died on 3 March 1989 in Beijing.

His granddaughter, Li Jie, is the mother of Yabshi Pan Rinzinwangmo.

== See also ==
- List of officers of the People's Liberation Army
