= Zhou Chunquan =

Chinese general

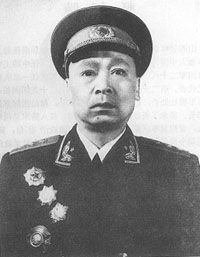
- Native name: 周纯全
- Born: October 6, 1905; Huang'an, Republic of China
- Died: 28 July 1985 (aged 79) Beijing, People’s Republic of China
- Buried: Babaoshan Revolutionary Cemetery
- Allegiance: Communist China; Republic of China; China
- Rank: General
- Conflicts: Chinese Civil War

General Zhou Chunquan (Chinese: 周纯全; pinyin: Zhōu Chúnquán; October 6, 1905 – July 28, 1985) was a general in the People's Liberation Army (PLA) of China.

Zhou was born in Huang'an (Now Hong'an County), Hubei Province. He joined Kuomintang (KMT) in July 1926, and joined the Chinese Communist Party in November that year. He fought in Huangma Uprising in November 1927.

In October 1932, Chunquan was appointed as the political commissar of the tenth division of Red Fourth Army. In June 1933, he was promoted to the political commissar of Red Fourth Army. He participated the Long March in 1935. He was appointed as the director of the general political department of Red Fourth Army Group, and the political commissar of Red 31st Army.

Chunquan became the political commissar of the logistics department of Chinese People's Volunteer Army in June 1951. When he returned to homeland in 1953, he was promoted to the No. 1 vice director and vice political commissar of the general logistics department of PLA.

Chunquan was made into a general in 1955.
