= Zhao Erlu =

Chinese general

Zhao Erlu (Chinese: 赵尔陆; pinyin: Zhào Ěrlù; 1905 – February 2, 1967) was a general in the People's Liberation Army of China.

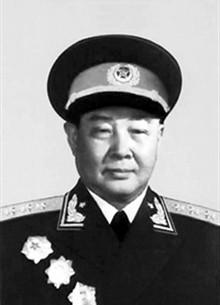
Zhao Erlu

== Biography ==
=== Early life ===
Zhao was born in Chunxian (Now Yuanping City) in the Shanxi Province.

=== Military career ===
Zhao participated in the Nanchang uprising in 1927, and joined the Chinese Communist Party that year.

He was the commander of the Hebei-Shanxi Military Region, the political commissar of the Hebei-Shanxi army group, and the chief of staff of the Jin-Cha-Ji Military Region. When the North China Military Region was founded in 1948, he was appointed as the chief of staff.

Zhao was the No. two chief of staff in the No. 4 Field Army and was made a general in 1955.

After the establishment of the People's Republic of China, he was appointed as the second chief of staff of the Mid-South Military Region. He was the director of the No. 2 and No. 1 Departments of Mechanical Industry. He was appointed as the vice director of the National Economy Commission in 1960. He was also the executive vice director of the office of national defense industry in the state council, and the director of the political department of the national defense industry.

=== Death ===
Zhao died of a sudden heart attack on February 2, 1967, at the age of 62.
