= Wang Hongkun =

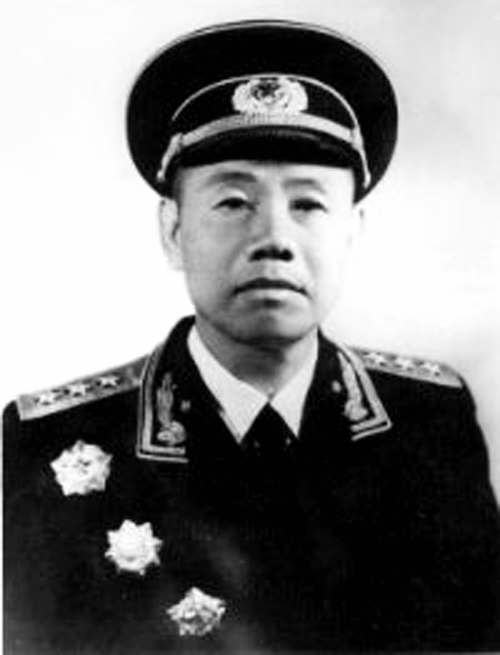
- Native name: 王宏坤
- Born: Macheng, Hubei, China

Wang Hongkun (Chinese: 王宏坤; 22 January 1909 – 20 August 1993) was a Chinese People's Liberation Army general and People's Liberation Army Navy admiral (海军上将), the first person to hold the rank.
