= Eighth Route Army =

Chinese Communist Party unit (1937–1947)

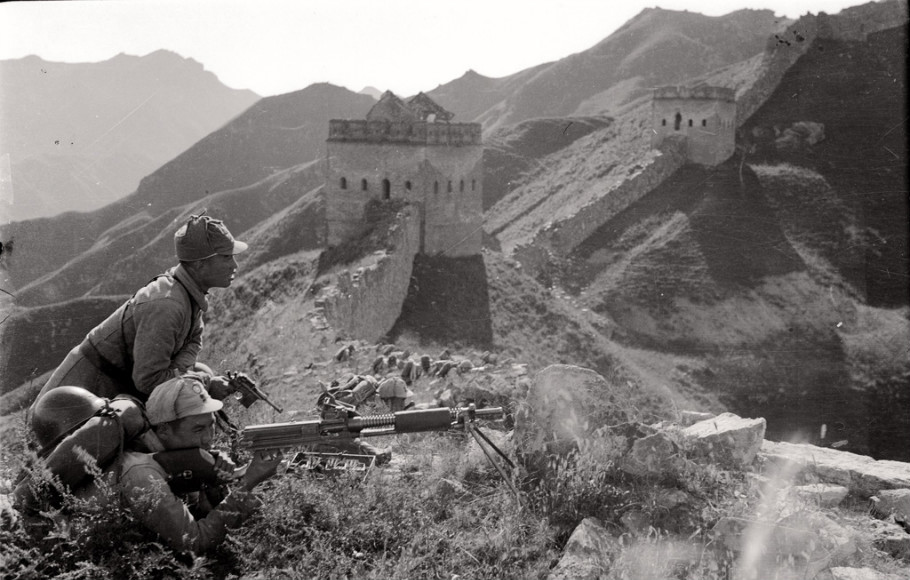
- Eighth Route Army fighting on the Futuyu Great Wall, Laiyuan, Hebei, 1938. Photograph by Sha Fei.
- Active: 1937–1947
- Country: China
- Allegiance: Chinese Communist Party
- Branch: National Revolutionary Army
- Type: Route Army
- Role: Infantry
- Size: 600,000
- Part of: CPC Central Military Commission; Nationalist Government Military Affairs Commission
- Garrison/HQ: Shanxi and Shaanxi
- Colors: Grey and White Uniform
- March: Military Anthem of the Eighth Route Army
- Engagements: Second Sino-Japanese War, Chinese Civil War

Commanders
- Commander: Zhu De
- Deputy Commander: Peng Dehuai

Insignia
- Arm badge, as Eighth Route Army

- Arm badge, as 18th Group Army

- Flag, as 18th Group Army

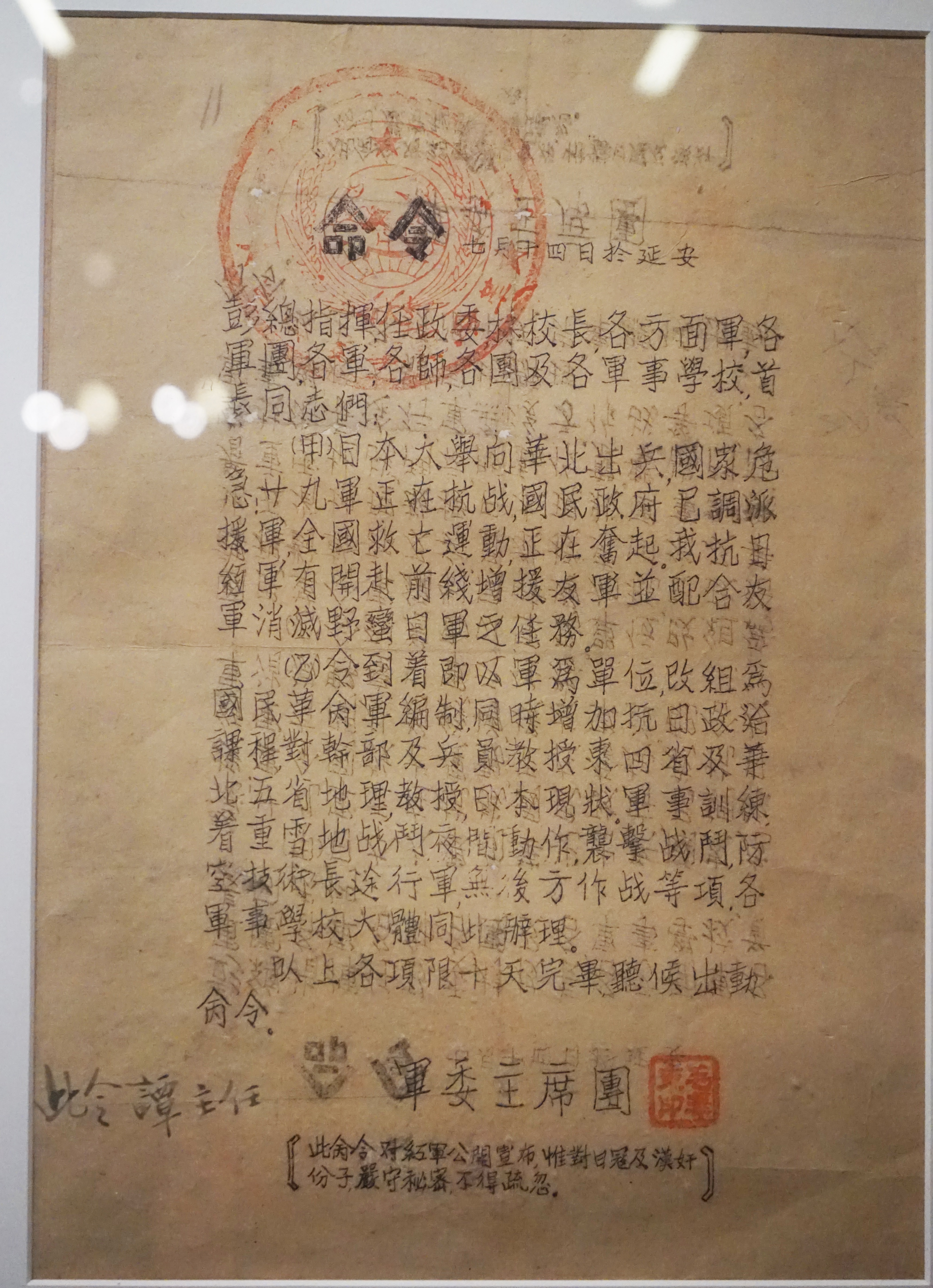
In July 1937, the Presidium of the Central Military Commission of the Chinese Communist Party issued an order for the Chinese Red Army to reorganize into the National Revolutionary Army and stand by for the anti-Japanese front line.

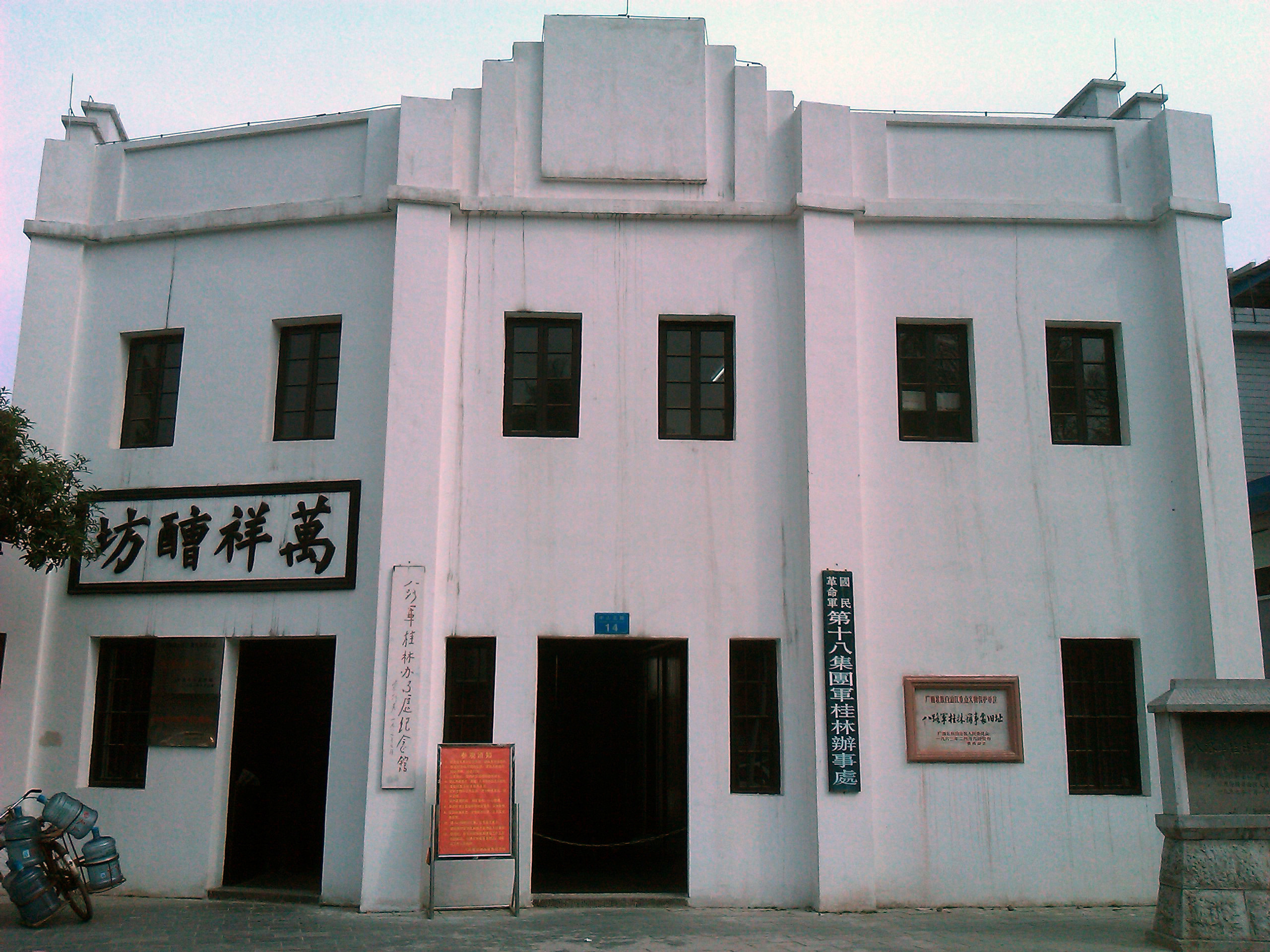
Former site of the Eighth Route Army Office in Guilin.

The Eighth Route Army (simplified Chinese: 八路军; traditional Chinese: 八路軍; pinyin: Bālù-Jūn), also known as the 18th Group Army, was a field army nominally under the banner of the National Revolutionary Army (NRA) of the Republic of China, established in 1937 as part of the Second United Front against Japan. In practice, the Eighth Route Army was under the exclusive command of the Chinese Communist Party (CCP) and operated independently of the Kuomintang (KMT) central military command. Unlike most NRA units, which were directly overseen by the Nationalist Government, the Eighth Route Army maintained separate political and operational structures aligned with CCP objectives.

The Eighth Route Army was created from the Chinese Red Army on September 22, 1937, when the Chinese Communists and Chinese Nationalists formed the Second United Front against Japan at the outbreak of the Second Sino-Japanese War, as the Chinese theater was known in World War II. Together with the New Fourth Army, the Eighth Route Army formed the main Communist fighting force during the war and was commanded by Communist party leader Mao Zedong and general Zhu De. Though officially designated the 18th Group Army by the Nationalists, the unit was referred to by the Chinese Communists and Japanese military as the Eighth Route Army. The Eighth Route Army wore Nationalist uniforms and flew the flag of the Republic of China and waged mostly guerrilla war against the Japanese, collaborationist forces and, later in the war, other Nationalist forces. The unit was renamed the People's Liberation Army in 1947, after the end of World War II, as the Chinese Communists and Nationalists resumed the Chinese Civil War.

== History ==
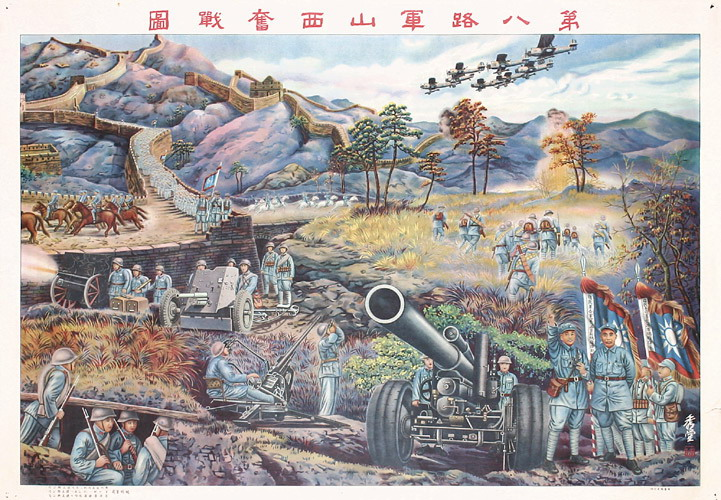
Chinese poster depicting the Eighth Route Army in Shanxi.

The Eighth Route Army consisted of three divisions (the 115th, which was commanded by Lin Biao, the 120th under He Long, and the 129th under Liu Bocheng). During World War II, the Eighth Route Army operated mostly in North China, infiltrating behind Japanese lines, to establish guerrilla bases in rural and remote areas. The main units of the Eighth Route Army were aided by local militias organized from the peasantry.

Shortly after the Marco Polo Bridge incident in 1937, the Eighth Route Army advanced into the Japanese rear in North China, establishing the Taihang resistance base area.

After its fall 1938 victory in the Battle of Wuhan, Japan advanced deep into Communist territory and redeployed 50,000 troops to the Shanxi-Chahar-Hebei Border Region. Elements of the Eighth Route Army soon attacked the advancing Japanese, inflicting between 3,000 and 5,000 casualties and resulting in a Japanese retreat.

The Communist Party's liaison offices in cities under Nationalist control such as Chongqing, Guilin and Dihua (Ürümqi) were called Eighth Route Army Offices.

Ethnic Koreans who fought in the Eighth Route Army later joined the Korean People's Army.

In the Yan'an base area in September 1938, the Eighth Route Army established its first film group.

The Eighth Route Army was also responsible for the reeducation of Japanese POWs, and defectors during the Second Sino-Japanese War. In November 1940, the General Political Department of the Eighth Route Army established the Yan'an Japanese Worker and Peasant School. On May 15, 1941, the school was officially opened at Baota Mountain, Yan'an.

Several notable Japanese soldiers joined the Eighth Route Army during the Second Sino-Japanese War. Including Hideo Miyagawa, Kobayashi Kancho, and Maeda Mitsushige, the first Japanese to join the Eighth Route Army during the war.

In October 1941, 35 Japanese in Yenan, including Oyama Mitsuyoshi, took an oath to officially join the Eighth Route Army.

At the start of the war in 1937, the Eighth Route Army consisted of 80,000 troops. By 1945, its ranks had swelled to 1,028,893 troops.

From September 1937 to 10 October 1945, the Eighth Route Army engaged with Japanese and Chinese collaborationist troops in 99,847 battles, claiming to have killed or wounded 713,930 (401,648 Japanese and 312,282 collaborationist), captured 407,208 (5,096 Japanese and 402,112 collaborationist), and accepted the surrender and defection of 137,565 (710 Japanese and 136,855 collaborationist). In the same period, the Eighth Route Army suffered 121,444 killed and 225,687 wounded.

== Organization ==
=== 1937 ===
In August 1937, the Eighth Route Army had three divisions.

Division	Commander	Order of battle	Commander	Troop strength
115th Division	Lin Biao	343rd Brigade	Chen Guang	15,000
115th Division	Lin Biao	344th Brigade	Xu Haidong	15,000
115th Division	Lin Biao	Independent Regiment	Yang Chengwu	15,000
120th Division	He Long	358th Brigade	Lu Dongsheng	14,000
120th Division	He Long	359th Brigade	Chen Bojun	14,000
120th Division	He Long	Teaching Regiment	Peng Shaohui	14,000
129th Division	Liu Bocheng	385th Brigade	Wang Hongkun	13,000
129th Division	Liu Bocheng	386th Brigade	Chen Geng	13,000
129th Division	Liu Bocheng	Teaching Regiment	Zhang Xian (张贤)	13,000

=== 1940 ===
In Winter 1940 the Eighth Route Army had increased to 400,000 soldiers.

Division	Commander	Order of battle	Commander	Troop strength
115th Division	Chen Guang	1st Teaching Brigade	Peng Mingzhi	70,000
115th Division	Chen Guang	2nd Teaching Brigade	Zeng Guohua	70,000
115th Division	Chen Guang	3rd Teaching Brigade; Western Shandong Military Region	Yang Yong	70,000
115th Division	Chen Guang	4th Teaching Brigade; Western Lake Military Region	Deng Keming	70,000
115th Division	Chen Guang	5th Teaching Brigade	Liang Xingchu	70,000
115th Division	Chen Guang	6th Teaching Brigade; Shandong and Hebei Military Region	Xing Renfu	70,000
115th Division	Chen Guang	Southern Shandong Military Region	Zhang Guangzhong	70,000
Shandong Column	Zhang Jingwu	1st Brigade	Wang Jian'an	51,000
Shandong Column	Zhang Jingwu	2nd Brigade	Sun Jixian	51,000
Shandong Column	Zhang Jingwu	3rd Brigade	Xu Shiyou	51,000
Shandong Column	Zhang Jingwu	5th Brigade	Wu Kehua	51,000
Shandong Column	Zhang Jingwu	1st Detachment	Hu Qicai	51,000
Shandong Column	Zhang Jingwu	4th Detachment	Zhao Jie	51,000
Shandong Column	Zhang Jingwu	5th Detachment	Wang Bin (王彬)	51,000
120th Division; Western and Northern Shanxi Military Region	He Long	1st Independent Brigade; 4th Military Subarea	Gao Shiyi (高士一)	51,000
120th Division; Western and Northern Shanxi Military Region	He Long	2nd Independent Brigade; 2nd Military Subarea	Peng Shaohui	51,000
120th Division; Western and Northern Shanxi Military Region	He Long	358th Brigade; 3rd Military Subarea	Zhang Zongxun	51,000
120th Division; Western and Northern Shanxi Military Region	He Long	2nd Shanxi Youth Column; 8th Military Subarea	Han Jun	51,000
120th Division; Western and Northern Shanxi Military Region	He Long	Cavalry Detachment	Yao Zhe	51,000
129th Division	Liu Bocheng	Taihang Mountain Military Subarea	Liu Bocheng	56,000
129th Division	Liu Bocheng	386th Brigade; Taiyue Mountain Military Subarea	Chen Geng	56,000
129th Division	Liu Bocheng	Southern Hebei Military Subarea	Chen Zaidao	56,000
Shanxi, Hebei and Chahaer Military Region	Nie Rongzhen	1st Military Subarea	Yang Chengwu	100,000
Shanxi, Hebei and Chahaer Military Region	Nie Rongzhen	2nd Military Subarea	Guo Tianmin	100,000
Shanxi, Hebei and Chahaer Military Region	Nie Rongzhen	3rd Military Subarea	Huang Yongsheng	100,000
Shanxi, Hebei and Chahaer Military Region	Nie Rongzhen	4th Military Subarea	Xiong Botao	100,000
Shanxi, Hebei and Chahaer Military Region	Nie Rongzhen	5th Military Subarea	Deng Hua	100,000
Shanxi, Hebei and Chahaer Military Region	Nie Rongzhen	3rd Column; Middle Hebei Military Region	Lü Zhengcao	100,000
Shanxi, Hebei and Chahaer Military Region	Nie Rongzhen	Advanced Detachment	Xiao Ke	100,000
Shaanxi Left Behind Corps	Xiao Jinguang	385th Brigade	Wang Weizhou	22,600
Shaanxi Left Behind Corps	Xiao Jinguang	359th Brigade	Wang Zhen	22,600
Shaanxi Left Behind Corps	Xiao Jinguang	1st Security Brigade	Wen Niansheng	22,600
Shaanxi Left Behind Corps	Xiao Jinguang	Security Command	Gao Gang	22,600
Others		2nd Column; Hebei, Shandong and Henan Military Region	Yang Dezhi	50,000
Others		4th Column	Peng Xuefeng	50,000
Others		5th Column	Huang Kecheng	50,000

== See also ==
- Guerrilla
- National Revolutionary Army
- People's Liberation Army
- Peng Dehuai
- Zhu De

Preceded by Chinese Red Army	Armed Wing of the Chinese Communist Party; 25 August 1937 – 1 November 1948 with New Fourth Army; 12 October 1937 – 1 November 1948	Succeeded by People's Liberation Army
