= Order of Liberation (China) =

- Order of Liberation (Third Class) and Medal of Liberation
- Type: Chinese military medal
- Country: People's Republic of China
- Presented by: Standing Committee of the National People's Congress
- Eligibility: Military personnel only
- Established: 1955
- First award: 1955
- Final award: 1955

Highlights
- Total: 421 (First Class); 4,932 (Second Class); 54,879 (Third Class)

Order of Liberation
- Traditional Chinese: 解放勳章
- Simplified Chinese: 解放勋章
Transcriptions
Standard Mandarin
- Hanyu Pinyin: Jiěfàng Xūnzhāng

Order of Liberation (Chinese: 解放勋章; pinyin: Jiěfàng Xūnzhāng) was a Chinese military award awarded to heroes of the Liberation of mainland China during the later phases of the Chinese Civil War between 3 September 1945 and 30 June 1950. There are three grades: First Class Medal, Second Class Medal, and Third Class Medal, as well as the Medal of Liberation.

== Pattern ==
=== Service Ribbon ===
1st Class

2nd Class

3rd Class

Medal of Liberation

== Notable recipients ==
- Ten Marshals: Zhu De, Peng Dehuai, Lin Biao, Liu Bocheng, He Long, Chen Yi, Luo Ronghuan, Xu Xiangqian, Nie Rongzhen, Ye Jianying.
- Ten Senior Generals: Su Yu, Xu Haidong, Huang Kecheng, Chen Geng, Tan Zheng, Xiao Jinguang, Zhang Yunyi, Luo Ruiqing, Wang Shusheng, Xu Guangda.
- General officer: Tao Zhiyue, Huang Yongsheng, Dong Qiwu, etc.
- Lieutenant general: Ding Qiusheng, Wang Jinshan, Wang Enmao, etc.
- Major general: Ye Changgen, Li Zhen, Liu Ziqi, Sun Chaoqun, Yang Yongsong, etc.
