= August 1 Medal (1955) =

Chinese military award

August 1 Medal Order of Bayi
- Type: Chinese military medal
- Country: People's Republic of China
- Presented by: Standing Committee of the National People's Congress
- Eligibility: Military personnel only
- Established: 1955
- First award: September 27, 1955
- Final award: June 18, 1957

Highlights
- Total: 47 (First Class); 1,467 (Second Class); 5,339 (Third Class)

August 1 Medal
- Traditional Chinese: 八一勳章
- Simplified Chinese: 八一勋章
Transcriptions
Standard Mandarin
- Hanyu Pinyin: Bāyī Xūnzhāng

The August 1 Medal (Chinese: 八一勋章; pinyin: Bā Yī Xūn Zhāng), sometimes known as the Order of Bayi, was a Chinese military award awarded to heroes of the Liberation of China during the Chinese Civil War, that started on August 1, 1927. There are three grades: First Class, Second Class, and Third Class.

== Pattern ==
=== Service Ribbon ===
1st Class

2nd Class

3rd Class

== Notable recipients ==
- Ten Marshals: Zhu De, Peng Dehuai, Lin Biao, Liu Bocheng, He Long, Chen Yi, Luo Ronghuan, Xu Xiangqian, Nie Rongzhen, Ye Jianying.
- Ten Senior Generals: Su Yu, Xu Haidong, Huang Kecheng, Chen Geng, Tan Zheng, Xiao Jinguang, Zhang Yunyi, Luo Ruiqing, Wang Shusheng, Xu Guangda.
- General officer: Song Renqiong, Wang Zhen, Xu Shiyou, etc.
- Lieutenant general: Kong Qingde, Wang Jinshan, Wang Shangrong, etc.
- Major general: Han Dongshan, Jin Rubai, Sun Chaoqun, Yang Yongsong, etc.
- Senior colonel: Zhou Shiyuan, Luo Houfu, and Xing Shixiu.
- Soldiers: Feng Baiju, Feng Zhongyun, Li Yanlu, and Zhou Baozhong.
