= Order of Independence and Freedom =

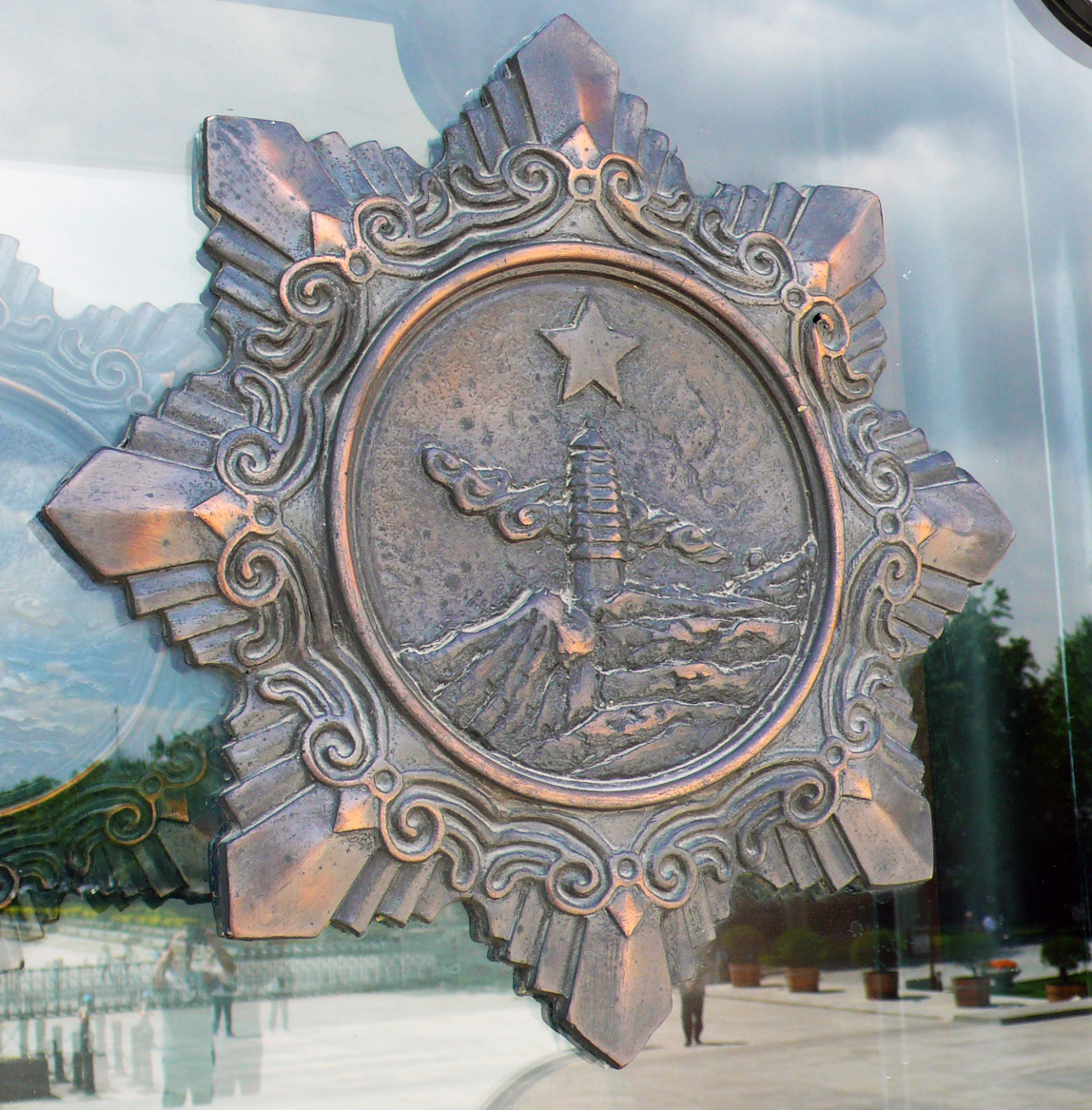
- Order of Independence and Freedom (First Class Medal)
- Type: Chinese military medal
- Country: People's Republic of China
- Presented by: Standing Committee of the National People's Congress
- Eligibility: Military personnel only
- Established: 1955
- First award: 1955
- Final award: 1955

Highlights
- Total: 196 (First Class Medal); 4,152 (Second Class Medal); 31,098 (Third Class Medal)

Order of Independence and Freedom
- Traditional Chinese: 獨立自由勳章
- Simplified Chinese: 独立自由勋章
Transcriptions
Standard Mandarin
- Hanyu Pinyin: Dúlì Zìyóu Xūnzhāng

Order of Independence and Freedom (Chinese: 独立自由勋章; pinyin: Dúlì Zìyóu Xūnzhāng) was a military award from the People's Republic of China. It was created in 1955, to give recognition to men who distinguished themselves "conspicuously by gallantry and intrepidity" in combat with an enemy of China in the Second Sino-Japanese War. There are three grades: First Class, Second Class, and Third Class.

== Pattern ==
=== Service Ribbon ===
1st Class

2nd Class

3rd Class

== Notable recipients ==
- Ten Marshals: Zhu De, Peng Dehuai, Lin Biao, Liu Bocheng, He Long, Chen Yi, Luo Ronghuan, Xu Xiangqian, Nie Rongzhen, Ye Jianying.
- Ten Senior Generals: Su Yu, Xu Haidong, Huang Kecheng, Chen Geng, Tan Zheng, Xiao Jinguang, Zhang Yunyi, Luo Ruiqing, Wang Shusheng, Xu Guangda.
- General officer: Song Renqiong, Xiao Ke, Xu Shiyou, Li Kenong, Huang Yongsheng, etc.
- Lieutenant general: Ding Qiusheng, Wang Jinshan, Wang Enmao, etc.
- Major general: Han Dongshan, Sun Chaoqun, Yang Yongsong, Yuan Kefu, etc.
