= Decisive Engagement: The Liaoxi-Shenyang Campaign =

- DVD cover
- Traditional Chinese: 大決戰之遼沈戰役
- Simplified Chinese: 大决战之辽沈战役
- Literal meaning: Great Decisive Battle: Liaoxi–Shenyang Campaign
- Hanyu Pinyin: dà juézhàn zhī Liáo Shěn zhànyì
- Directed by: Li Jun; Yang Guangyuan; Wei Lian; Cai Jiwei; Zhao Jilie; Zhai Junjie; Jing Mukui
- Written by: Li Pingfen; Shi Chao; Wang Jun
- Produced by: Yang Qingwei
- Starring: Gu Yue; Su Lin; Ma Shaoxin; Lu Jixian; Zhao Hengduo; Wu Zhiyuan
- Cinematography: Qu Peiming; Sang Hua; Zhu Lutong; Yin Qiaofang
- Edited by: Kou Honglie
- Music by: Sun Juzhen; Fei Lanxin; Cui Denggao; Zhao Changsheng
- Production company: August First Film Studio
- Distributed by: August First Film Studio
- Release date: 1 January 1992
- Running time: 220 minutes
- Country: China
- Language: Mandarin

Decisive Engagement: The Liaoxi-Shenyang Campaign (Chinese: 大决战之辽沈战役) is a 1991 Chinese epic war film directed by Li Jun, Yang Guangyuan, Wei Lian, Cai Jiwei, Zhao Jilie, Zhai Junjie and Jing Mukui, written by Li Pingfen, Shi Chao and Wang Jun, and starring Gu Yue, Su Lin, Ma Shaoxin, Lu Jixian, Zhao Hengduo, and Wu Zhiyuan. The film premiered in China on January 1, 1992. The film is about the Liaoshen Campaign of the Chinese Civil War.

== Plot ==
In the spring of 1948, during the Chinese Civil War, the Central Military Commission commands the Fourth Field Army control Jinzhou, a communication hub in northeast China and a city of vital importance to military strategists. The Liaoshen campaign broke out, the People's Liberation Army fight the Nationalist forces in northeastern China, then the land is occupied by the Chinese Communist Party.

== Cast ==
=== Main ===
- Gu Yue as Mao Zedong
- Su Lin as Zhou Enlai
- Ma Shaoxin as Lin Biao
- Lu Jixian as Luo Ronghuan
- Zhao Hengduo as Chiang Kai-shek
- Wu Zhiyuan as Soong May-ling

=== Supporting ===
==== Chinese Communist Party characters ====
- Guo Fazeng as Liu Shaoqi
- Liu Huaizheng as Zhu De
- Zong Liqun as Peng Dehuai
- Lu Qi as Deng Xiaoping
- Zhang Weiguo as Liu Yalou
- Gao Huibin as Tan Zheng
- Yao Jude as Su Jing
- Lu Xi as Ren Bishi
- Zhang Yonghan as He Long
- Zhao Xiaoming as Xu Xiangqian
- Qiao Hong as Ye Jianying
- Feng Enhe as Duan Suquan
- Wu Honghou as Han Xianchu
- Chen Gang as Li Xiannian
- Gao Qiang as Battalion commander Gao
- Zhang Yongxiang as Company commander Zhang
- Chen Xiaolei as a soldier.

==== Kuomintang characters ====
- Yang Ciyu as Li Zongren
- Lu Xuegong as Wei Lihuang
- Xu Zhengyun as Du Yuming
- Yan Yusheng as Fan Hanjie
- Shi Jing as Zheng Dongguo
- Zhou Zhiyu as Liao Yaoxiang
- Chen Xuegang as He Yingqin
- Qin Zhao as Chiang Ching-kuo
- Xie Gang as Chiang Wei-kuo
- Lu Fei as Gu Zhutong
- Ma Dalong as Zhao Jiaxiang
- Song Chunli as Han Quanhua, wife of Wei Lihuang.
- Cui Kefa as Yu Jishi
- Qu Yuan as Chen Bulei
- Huang Gang as Liao Yaoxiang
- Zhao Xiaochuan as Zheng Dongguo
- Sun Haiying as a lieutenant commander

== Production ==
=== Development ===
In 1950s, the August First Film Studio was planning films about the three major campaigns: Liaoshen campaign, Huaihai campaign and Pingjin campaign. But because of the limits of conditions, the project had been put on hold. In January 1986, the then General Secretary of the Chinese Communist Party Hu Yaobang ordered the relevant organizations to turn the three major campaigns into a feature. The Central Military Commission began to negotiate with the August First Film Studio to produce a film. In February 1986, Li Pingfen (李平分), Shi Chao (史超) and Wang Jun (王军) signed on to write the script for the film. They consulted a lot of data, including the memoirs of veterans, interviewed more than 300 campaign participants, and also surveyed the old battlefields. The then vice-chairman of Central Military Commission Yang Shangkun and the then director of the General Political Department Yang Baibing had repeatedly summoned the producers to discuss the film. At the end of 1987, the film finally finished writing. Li Jun (李俊) was signed to direct the film and Yang Qingwei (杨庆卫) served as general producer. At the end of 1989, the directors visited Nie Rongzhen, a commander in the Pingjin Campaign. The title of the film was written by Jiang Zemin, General Secretary of the Chinese Communist Party. After seeing the film, Deng Xiaoping said, "The film is very good. I watch it every year."

=== Casting ===
Gu Yue, Lu Qi and Ma Shaoxin (马绍信) were cast in respective lead roles of Mao Zedong, Deng Xiaoping and Lin Biao for the film. Zhao Hengduo (赵恒多) was selected to cast as Chiang Kai-shek and Su Lin (苏林) was selected to cast as Zhou Enlai.

=== Filming ===
Filming took place in Heilongjiang, Zhejiang, Ningxia, and Shandong. Nearly 800 of the 1000 workers in the August First Film Studio participated in the shooting. PLA soldiers from Shenyang Military Region, Beijing Military Region, Jinan Military Region, Nanjing Military Region and Lanzhou Military Region participated in the film. The scenes of Mao Zedong labours up the hillside and the ice thawing on the Yellow River were filmed in northern Shaanxi. It took the camera crew two years to film all the Yellow River scenes.

== Release ==
Decisive Engagement: The Liaoxi-Shenyang Campaign premiered in the Great Hall of the People on August 1, 1991, with wide-release in China on January 1, 1992.

== Accolades ==
| Date | Award | Category | Recipient(s) and nominee(s) | Result | Notes |
|---|---|---|---|---|---|
| 1992 | Golden Rooster Awards | Best Picture | Decisive Engagement: The Liaoxi-Shenyang Campaign | Won | |
| 1992 | Golden Rooster Awards | Best Director | Director Group | Won | |
| 1992 | Golden Rooster Awards | Best Fireworks | Decisive Engagement: The Liaoxi-Shenyang Campaign | Won | |
| 1992 | Golden Rooster Awards | Best Art Direction | Decisive Engagement: The Liaoxi-Shenyang Campaign | Won | |
| 1992 | Golden Rooster Awards | Best Editing | Kou Honglie | Won | |
| 1992 | Golden Rooster Awards | Best Props | Decisive Engagement: The Liaoxi-Shenyang Campaign | Won | |
| 1992 | Golden Rooster Awards | Best Writing | Li Pingfen, Shi Chao and Wang Jun | Nominated | |
| 1992 | Hundred Flowers Awards | Best Picture | Decisive Engagement: The Liaoxi-Shenyang Campaign | Won | |
