= Zheng Dongguo =

Chinese general (1903–1991)

Zheng Dongguo 鄭洞國
- General Zheng Dongguo

Chairman of Jilin Provincial Government
- In office March 1948 – 19 October 1948
- Preceded by: Liang Huasheng
- Succeeded by: Position abolished

Personal details
- Born: 13 January 1903 Shimen County, Hunan, China
- Died: 27 January 1991 (aged 88) Beijing, People's Republic of China

Military service
- Allegiance: Republic of China
- Years of service: 1924–1948
- Rank: Lieutenant General
- Commands: Second Division; 98th Army; 11th Army; 21st Army; 8th Army; 200th Division; New 1st Army; Northeast Security Command; First Corps of the Northeastern Bandit Suppression Headquarters
- Battles/wars: Northern Expedition; World War II; Second Sino-Japanese War; Defense of the Great Wall; Battle of Taierzhuang; Battle of Wuhan; Battle of South Guangxi; Battle of Kunlun Pass; Burma Campaign; Chinese Civil War; Fifth encirclement campaign against the Jiangxi Soviet; Liaoshen Campaign; Siege of Changchun (surrendered)

Zheng Dongguo (simplified Chinese: 郑洞国; traditional Chinese: 鄭洞國; pinyin: Zhèng Dòngguó; Wade–Giles: Cheng Tung-kuo; 13 January 1903 – 27 January 1991) was a field commander in the Republic of China National Revolutionary Army. He took part in the Second Sino-Japanese War, and was active in southern China and in the Burma theatre of the war, drawing troops from Yunnan. After the Japanese surrender in 1945, he was an important commander in the Chinese Civil War serving under Du Yuming and Chen Cheng in Manchuria.

== Early life and education ==
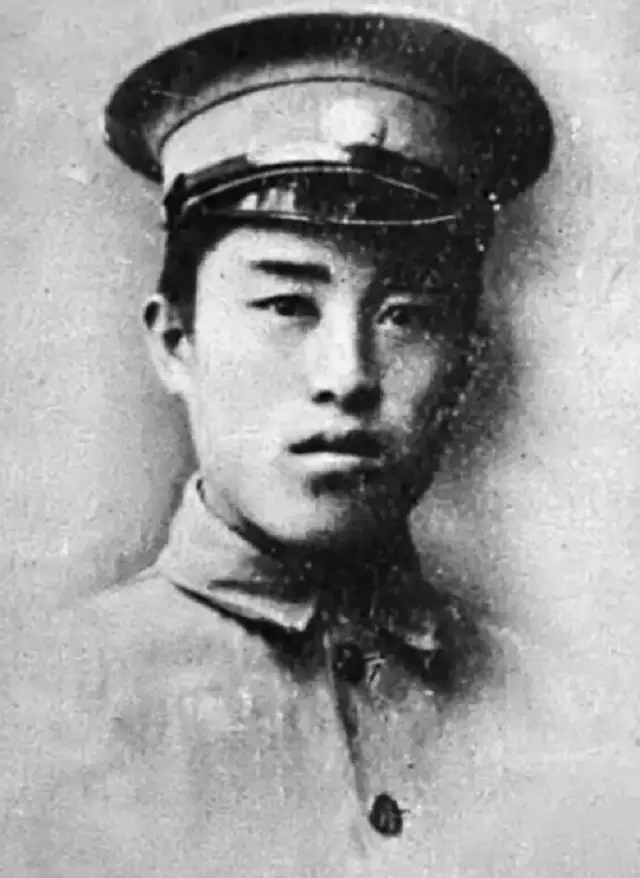
Zheng as a cadet in Whampoa Military Academy (1924)

Born in 1903 in Shimen County, Hunan, Zheng began reading the Analects by Confucius under the guidance of his father at the age of seven and following his entry into private school, he began to study the Four Books and Five Classics. Zheng was conservative with respect to Chinese cultural traditions of filial piety, which was recognized by other Neo-Confucians like Chiang Kai-shek. In 1917, he entered the primary school affiliated to Shimen Middle School and two years later, he began studying at Shimen Middle School. While in middle school, he participated in the May Fourth Movement by spreading propaganda about the movement in the streets with his classmates. After graduating from Shimen Middle School in 1922, he taught at the primary school in Shimen. A year later, he went to Changsha and was admitted to the Hunan Provincial Commercial School. In 1924, he was admitted to Whampoa Military Academy and graduated in November of the same year. During his time in Whampoa, he served as the party representative of the Fourth Company of the Second Battalion within First Regiment of the National Revolutionary Army.

== Military career ==
In February 1925, he participated in the Eastern Expedition of the National Revolutionary Army. In the battle near Guangdong, he assumed the position of the battalion party representative of the third battalion after its earlier holder was killed in action and then led the unit in defeating the enemy. In March of the following year, he served as the battalion commander of the First Battalion of the Eighth Regiment of the Third Division of the First Army.

In October 1926, he took part in the Northern Expedition and entered Fujian under the command of General He Yingqin. At a battle in Yongding, he led the First Battalion for which he was commended for leading decisively and bravely. In November of the same year, he was promoted as commander of the Eighth Regiment and advanced towards Chinese coastal provinces of Zhejiang and Jiangsu. In August 1927, he served as the chief of staff of the Xuzhou Garrison Command and was later transferred to as head of the Ninth Army Training Corps. After the end of the Northern Expedition in 1928, he was transferred to command the Tenth Regiment of the Fifth Brigade of the Second Division. After that, he successively participated in the Chiang-Gui War, the Chiang-Tang War and the Central Plains War.

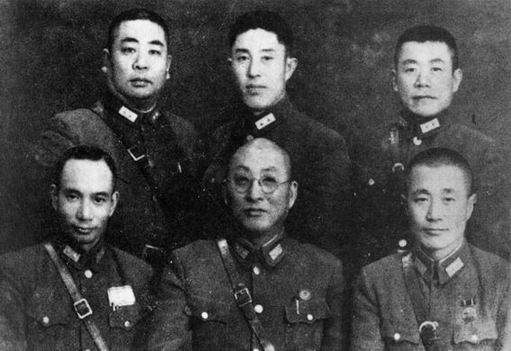
NRA Generals who took part in the Defense of the Great Wall, in a group photo in Chongqing. Zheng is standing, second from left (1942)

At the end of 1931, he served as the commander of the 4th Regiment of the 2nd Brigade of the 1st Nanjing Guard Division, and later served as the commander of the 2nd Independent Brigade, participating in the encirclement and suppression of the Eyuwan Soviet area. After that, he was assigned as commander of the 4th Brigade of the 2nd Division, stationed in Luoyang.

Zheng was an outspoken critic of the Japanese presence in Manchuria and especially of the Japanese efforts to build up the state of Manchukuo. In 1933, Zheng led his troops north to participate in the Defense of the Great Wall against the Empire of Japan, fighting the Imperial Japanese Army for nearly two months in Gubeikou and inflicted heavy losses on the Japanese army in fierce battle on the Nantianmen front. In 1934, he participated in the fifth encirclement campaign against the Jiangxi Soviet and pursued the Chinese Red Army to Zhijiang County during the Chinese Civil War. The following year, he was promoted to the commander of the 2nd Division and stationed in Xuzhou and Bengbu.

=== Second Sino-Japanese War & World War II ===
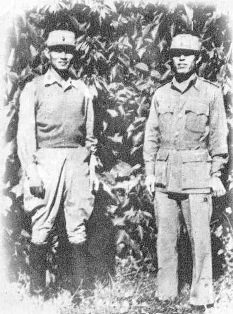
Generals Zheng and Sun Liren in Burma during World War II

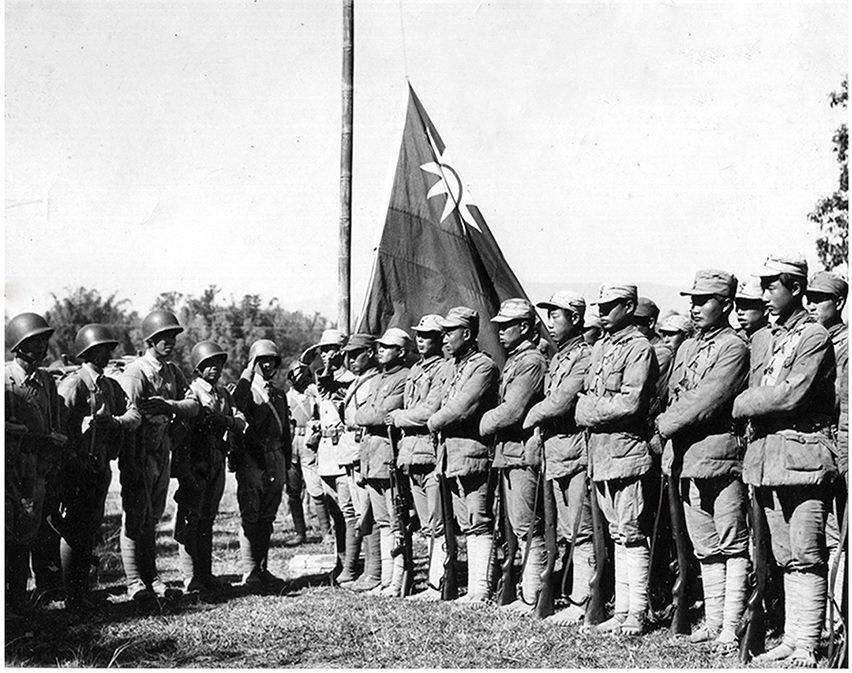
Elements of the Chinese Expeditionary Force in Burma (1945)

Following the start of the Second Sino-Japanese War, Zheng led his troops to participate in the Battle of Baoding. Afterwards, he moved to Lin County, Henan to engage in guerrilla warfare against the Japanese army, and attacked Anyang city and the airport in the city. In March 1938, he led his troops to participate in the Battle of Taierzhuang, and together with friendly forces, he defeated the Seya Detachment of the 10th Division of the Imperial Japanese Army. Later, he participated in the Battle of Wuhan and was promoted to deputy commander of the 17th Army. Zheng was appointed as deputy commander of the 37th Army. At the end of 1938, he was promoted to commander of the 98th Army and was later transferred as deputy commander of the newly formed 11th Army (later renamed the 5th Army) and commander of the Honor 1st Division. During his command, Zheng strengthened training and strict discipline, which improved the combat effectiveness of the troops. In December 1939, the 5th Army was transferred to southern Guangxi to participate in the Battle of Kunlun Pass. During the battle, Zheng personally commanded the front line and successively captured important strongholds. He also led his army group in attacking Kunlun Pass twice resulting in the death of Major General Masao Nakamura, the commander of the 21st Brigade of the Imperial Japanese Army, during the Battle of South Guangxi. Later, he was promoted as commander of the newly formed 11th Army and after participating in the Battle of Zaoyang–Yichang, he took on the defense mission of the area west of Yichang and north of Yidu in Hubei.

In the autumn of 1943, Zheng was transferred to become the commander of the New 1st Army of the Chinese Expeditionary Force in India. He was later promoted to deputy commander-in-chief of the Chinese Expeditionary Force but the command of the force mainly remained under the hands of US Army General Joseph Stilwell. In the late October, the main forces of the New 22nd and 38th Divisions in Ledo Road arrived at the edge of the Hukawng Valley and the counter-offensive of the Chinese Expeditionary Force against Japanese forces in northern Burma began. After a bloody battle, the 38th Division captured Yubang in Kachin State on December 29. Subsequently, with the cooperation of the New 38th Division, the New 22nd Division captured Maingkwan. Later, the two divisions cooperated to capture town of Walawbum. In April 1944, the reinforced Chinese Expeditionary Force along with US Army's Merrill's Marauders began to attack Myitkyina. After three months of attack, Myitkyina was captured by Allied forces. In August, the New 1st Army was expanded into the New 1st Army and the New 6th Army, and Zheng was promoted to deputy commander-in-chief of the Chinese Expeditionary Force in India, and a deputy general command was established. On October 16, the Chinese Expeditionary Force in India continued its offensive and captured Bhamo in northern Burma on December 15. On 15 January 1945, the New First Army captured Namhkam in Shan State and continued their advance. After that, the New 1st Army continued to capture towns such as Hsipaw, Lashio and Theinni. During his time with the Chinese Expeditionary Force, he established the Ramgarh Chinese War Cemetery in Jharkhand, India, where Chinese soldiers who died while serving in the expeditionary force are buried at. In Yunnan, Zheng was considered popular with his troops, and many of the soldiers recruited and trained there would remain with him throughout the remainder of his campaigns with the Kuomintang. It is during this time that Zheng came under the command of General Du Yuming, and himself gained a degree of notoriety inside China.

At the Sixth National Congress of the Kuomintang in June 1945, Zheng was elected as an alternate member of the Central Executive Committee. In August, Zheng was appointed deputy commander of the 3rd Front Army and on September 9, Zheng participated in the surrender signing ceremony of the Japanese army in China.

=== Chinese Civil War ===
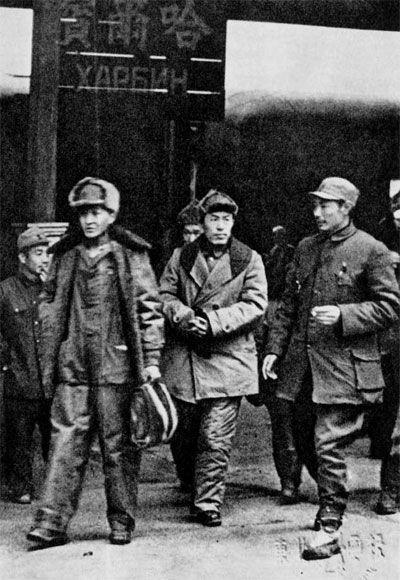
Zheng (center) in Harbin following the end of the siege (1948)

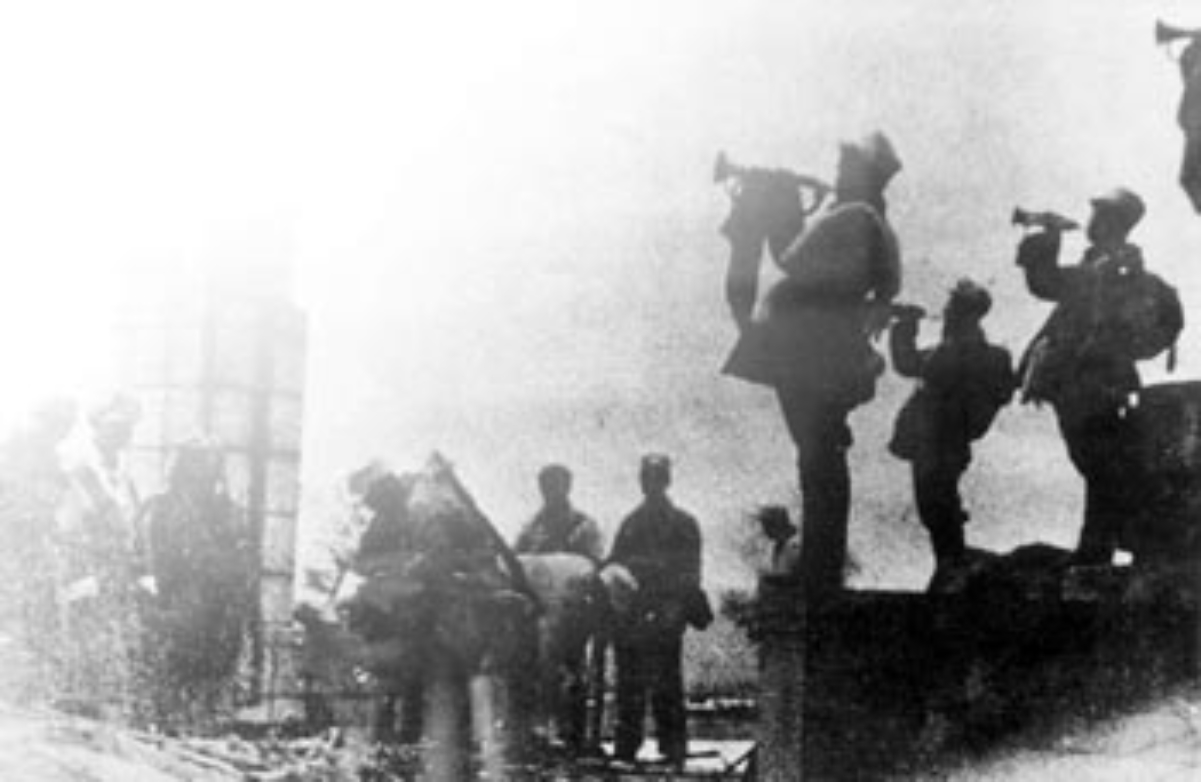
PLA troops in Changchun after the end of the siege (1948)

In January 1946, Zheng arrived in Northeast China at the invitation of Du Yuming and served as the acting deputy commander-in-chief of the Northeast Security Command, as Du Yuming, at that time, was seeking medical treatment in Beijing. Following Zheng's arrival, he commanded the National Revolutionary Army to advance rapidly along the Peking–Mukden Railway, first entering Shenyang where the Soviet Red Army, following the Soviet invasion of Manchuria, had withdrawn, and captured Anshan, Yingkou, Liaoyang, Fushun and other major cities in the Northeast.

In May, he served as the commander-in-chief of the front line, and led the New 6th Army and parts of the 71st Army and the 52nd Army to the Northeast to participate in the Siping Campaign, and then occupied Changchun and other cities, confronting the communist-led Northeast Democratic United Army across the Songhua River. In August, he commanded the troops to attack Rehe and captured most of the towns in the province. On 13 July 1947, Zheng Dongguo was appointed as commander-in-chief of the Northeast Security Command after the former commander Du Yuming resigned due to illness on 8 July. In August, he was appointed deputy director of the Northeast Headquarters. On December 21, he flew to Nanjing to report to Chiang Kai-shek on military updates in the Northeast and to ask for instructions. On December 24, he flew back to Shenyang and in January 1948, he served as deputy commander-in-chief of the newly established 'Northeastern Bandit Suppression Headquarters'. In March, he concurrently served as commander of the First Corps and chairman of the Jilin Provincial Government, and led his troops to defend Changchun.

As part of the much greater Liaoshen Campaign, the People's Liberation Army forces led by Lin Biao, in the areas surrounding Changchun, cut off roads, railways, and other routes of entry and egress to the Northeast, and cordoned off the city of Changchun itself. Though not surrounded by an ancient city wall, owing to the modernity of the city, the garrison had constructed, with the help of conscripted civilian labor a large moat, eight feet deep and twelve feet wide in 1947. The defenders, veterans of many campaigns against communist and Japanese forces, were considered crack-troops. Lin Biao deemed an assault on the city was deemed too costly and dangerous. Instead, communist forces decided to conduct a siege of the city, while preparing ambushes and traps for any Nationalist relief columns, using the city as bait. On May 24, the People's Liberation Army captured Changchun Dafangshen Airport thereby cutting off the air connection between Changchun and Shenyang. At the end of June, Zheng organized a wartime food control committee and promulgated interim measures for food control in the city during wartime which stipulated that the amount of food that citizens can keep for themselves can only last for three months, and the rest should be sold to the municipal government at a fixed price to ensure the needs of the defenders. If the measures were to be violated by the citizens, the food will be confiscated from the citizens if they are found with them and severe punishment will be imposed.

On October 2, Chiang Kai-shek flew to Shenyang to hold a military meeting. Chiang did not order Zheng to break out of Changchun, knowing that friendly lines were too far away. Chiang instead attempted to order other forces to relieve the city, but this was ineffective. Chiang also attempted to keep the city supplied by air-drops, but the Nationalist air force was unable to fulfill this role due to its small size and lack of experience. A small quantity of the supplies intended for the garrison actually landed inside communist lines, and the communist troops sometimes used these items for propaganda effect. After destroying or thwarting several Nationalist relief columns, communist troops made overtures to the defenders, enticing them to surrender, but these were unsuccessful. On 15 October, the People's Liberation Army captured Jinzhou and the Nationalists suffered over 100,000 casualties. On the same day, Chiang Kai-shek personally arrived in Shenyang and airdropped a handwritten order to Zheng, ordering him to lead the 60th Army and the New 7th Army to break out immediately. Mao Zedong decided that Changchun would fall once the defenders had been weakened sufficiently. Famine was used by the communists during the siege in order to force the defending nationalist troops to capitulate; estimates range as high as 330,000. Communist forces allowed Nationalist soldiers to leave, but prevented civilians from doing so, going so far as to force them back into the city at gun-point. Many civilians starved to death at the city limits in front of communist forces as a result.

Under military pressure and the PLA's efforts, on the night of October 17, General Zeng Zesheng led three divisions of the 60th Army, totaling more than 26,000 soldiers, to defect towards the People's Liberation Army controlled eastern part of Changchun. On the morning of October 19, the New 7th Army laid down its arms and Changchun was completely occupied by the People's Liberation Army. Only Zheng Dongguo's Corps Headquarters and the Special Forces Regiment held on to the Central Bank Building in the city. The Corps' Deputy Chief of Staff General Yang Youmei contacted the People's Liberation Army and proposed resistance for one or two days before surrendering. At 11 pm on 20 October, Zheng Dongguo sent a farewell telegram to Chiang Kai-shek. At 4 am on 21 October, after a burst of gunfire into the air, the Corps Headquarters raised the white flag and surrendered. Zheng wanted to commit suicide, but his pistol had been taken away. He was surrounded by his subordinates and went to the first floor lobby of the bank building to meet representatives from the People's Liberation Army. Zheng finally agreed to lay down his arms and surrender, and await processing. The siege lasted for 150 days, and resulted in the deaths from starvation of approximately 80 percent of the civilian population. When the 60th Army and New 7th Army surrendered, only 40,000 survivors remained by the time Zheng gave the order.

== Later life ==
Following the founding of the People's Republic of China, Zheng moved from Shanghai to Beijing, and served as a counselor of the Ministry of Water Resources of the Central People's Government and a cultural and historical commissioner of the National Committee of the Chinese People's Political Consultative Conference. In September 1954, at the first session of the 1st National People's Congress, Chairman of the Chinese Communist Party Mao Zedong personally proposed that Zheng be made a member of the National Defense Council of the People's Republic of China. Zheng later served as a member of the 3rd and 4th National Committee of the Chinese People's Political Consultative Conferences, and a member of the Standing Committee of the 5th, 6th and 7th National Committees of the Chinese People's Political Consultative Conference. He also served as vice chairman of the 5th, 6th and 7th Central Committees of the Revolutionary Committee of the Chinese Kuomintang, and vice chairman of the Whampoa Military Academy Alumni Association. Following the 1972 visit of the President of the United States Richard Nixon to China, Zheng met and toasted with Nixon at a banquet during his visit.

In his later years, Zheng stated in several interviews that he regretted holding out for so long in Changchun, believing that it only caused further suffering and death. Zheng died on 27 January 1991 at 3:30 am in Beijing at the age of 88 due to illness. His death was mourned both in mainland China and Taiwan. On 26 February, his funeral was held at Babaoshan Revolutionary Cemetery in Beijing, after which his ashes were interred at the cemetery. In 2006, during the Qingming Festival, Zheng's relatives moved his ashes from Babaoshan and placed it in a tomb at the southern foot of Jiashan Mountain in Shimen County.

== Family ==
In 1918, at the age of 15, Zheng's father arranged for him to marry Tan La'e, a family girl from same village who was eight years older than him. In 1921, the couple had a daughter named Zheng Fengyun and two years later, son Zheng Anfei was born. After his return from Eastern Expedition, Zheng's wife gave birth to another son named Zheng Anteng. In 1928, Tan died of illness and Zheng's father was killed in the next year by bandits while escorting Tan's coffin back to Shimen County. In 1933, Zheng remarried to 17-year-old Chen Bilian. The couple did not have any children and divorced in the early 1950s. Zheng married for the third time to 35-year-old Gu Xianjuan and the couple had a daughter named Zheng Anyu. Gu died in 1972 due to illness and Zheng referred to her death as "another biggest blow in my life".

During the Siege of Changchun, both of Zheng's sons were invited by Chiang Kai-shek to study in Taiwan during the retreat of the government of Republic of China to Taiwan. After two months of stay in Taiwan, Zheng Anfei returned to mainland China while whereabouts of Zheng Anteng in Taiwan continue to remain unknown despite resumptions of exchanges between mainland China and Taiwan in the 1980s.

Zheng's grandson Zheng Jianbang is a politician who is currently a vice chairperson of the Standing Committee of the National People's Congress, and the chairperson of the Revolutionary Committee of the Chinese Kuomintang.

== Military decorations ==
- Order of Blue Sky and White Sun (30 January 1945)
- Order of the Sacred Tripod (degree unknown)
- Order of the Cloud and Banner (degree unknown)

== In popular culture ==
In the 1991 Chinese epic war film Decisive Engagement: The Liaoxi-Shenyang Campaign, he was portrayed by actor Shi Jing.

== See also ==
- Siege of Changchun
- White Snow, Red Blood

== Bibliography ==
- Zheng, Dongguo (1992). Wǒde róngmǎ shengyá : Zhèng dòngguó huíyì lù 我的戎马生涯: 郑洞国回忆录 [My Military Life: Memoirs of Zheng Dongguo] (in Chinese). Beijing: Tuánjié chū bǎnshè. ISBN 7800616258.
- Li, Xin; Han, Xinfu; Jiang, Kefu (2011). Zhōnghuá mínguó shǐ dàshì jì 中華民國史大事記 [Chronicle of the History of the Republic of China] (in Chinese). Beijing: Zhōnghuá shūjú yǒuxiàn gōng sī. ISBN 9787101079982.
