= Liaoshen campaign =

1948 Communist offensive of the Chinese Civil War

- Part of the Chinese Civil War
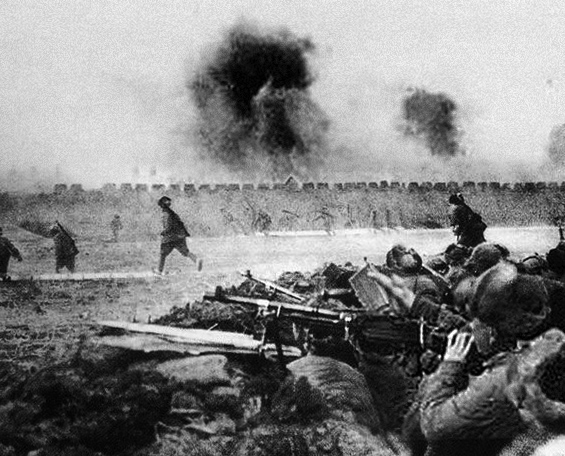
- Battle of Jinzhou
Date	12 September 1948 – 2 November 1948 (1 month and 3 weeks)
Location	Northeast China
Result	Communist victory
Territorial changes	Capture of Northeast China by the Communists

Belligerents
(Republic of China (1912–1949)) Republic of China: Republic of China Army	Communist Party: Northeast Field Army

Commanders and leaders
(Republic of China (1912–1949)) Wei Lihuang (Republic of China (1912–1949)) Fan Hanjie (POW) (Republic of China (1912–1949)) Zheng Dongguo (surrendered) (Republic of China (1912–1949)) Du Yuming (Republic of China (1912–1949)) Liao Yaoxiang (POW) (Republic of China (1912–1949)) Lu Junquan (POW) (Republic of China (1912–1949)) Zhou Fucheng (POW) (Republic of China (1912–1949)) Hou Jingru	Lin Biao; Luo Ronghuan; Liu Yalou; Xiao Jinguang; Cheng Zihua

Strength
580,000	700,000

Casualties and losses
~472,000	69,000

Liaoshen campaign
- Traditional Chinese: 遼瀋戰役
- Simplified Chinese: 辽沈战役
Transcriptions
Standard Mandarin
- Hanyu Pinyin: Líaoshên Zhànyì

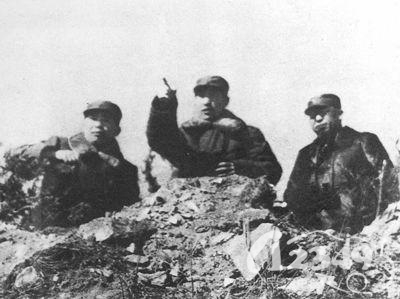
The chief of staff, commander and political commissar of the PLA Northeastern Field Army (respectively from left to right): Liu Yalou, Lin Biao and Luo Ronghuan

The Liaoshen campaign (Chinese: 辽沈会战; pinyin: Liáoshěn huìzhàn), an abbreviation of Liaoning–Shenyang campaign after the province of Liaoning and its Yuan directly administered capital city Shenyang, was the first of the three major military campaigns (along with Huaihai campaign and Pingjin campaign) launched by the Chinese Communist Party's People's Liberation Army (PLA) against the Kuomintang Nationalist government during the late stage of the Chinese Civil War. This engagement is also known to the Kuomintang as the Liaohsi campaign (Chinese: 遼西會戰; pinyin: Liáoxī huìzhàn), and took place between September and November 1948, lasting a total of 52 days. The campaign ended after the Nationalist forces suffered sweeping defeats across Manchuria, losing the major cities of Jinzhou, Changchun, and eventually Shenyang in the process, leading to the capture of the whole of Manchuria by the Communist forces. The victory of the campaign resulted in the Communists achieving a strategic numerical advantage over the Nationalists for the first time in its history.

== Background ==
=== Race for Manchuria ===
Manchuria, alternatively known as Northeast China in contemporary accounts, was the most industrialized region in China. In the immediate aftermath of the Second Sino-Japanese War, Manchuria was placed under Soviet occupation. Both the Nationalists and the Communists began their expansion in the region after the Soviet withdrawal in March 1946. After the Communist Winter Offensive of 1947 in Northeast China, the PLA had expanded considerably in the Northeast, surpassing the Nationalists in total operational strength in Northeast China for the first time since the beginning of the civil war. In response to the deteriorating situation for the Nationalists, Chiang Kai-shek decided to replace Chen Cheng with Wei Lihuang as the commander of the Nationalist forces in the Northeast.

== Prelude ==
In January 1948, the Communist forces in the Northeast were renamed as the Northeast Field Army with Lin Biao as the commander. The Nationalist forces were indecisive in responding to Communist expansion, as Wei Lihuang directly clashed with Chiang over Nationalist strategies in the Northeast. Wei believed that it was better to "preserve the status quo" and concentrate on defending Shenyang and Changchun, while Chiang insisted that Wei withdraw from those two cities and concentrate Nationalist forces in the Jinzhou-Huludao area to prevent the PLA from entering the North China Plain through the Shanhai Pass.

By spring 1948, the Communist forces were in control of the countryside across Northeast China, isolating the Nationalist forces in Shenyang, Changchun and Jinzhou from each other. In addition, the PLA had seized control of the Jingha Railway, cutting off the Nationalist land route supply lines to Shenyang and Changchun. Consequently, supplies for the Nationalist forces in the Northeast had to be airlifted, which were largely ineffective and unsustainable.

== Order of Battle ==
=== People's Liberation Army ===
The battle was conducted by the Northeast Field Army of the People's Liberation Army. The Northeast Field Army commanded all Communist forces in Manchuria and was led by Lin Biao with Luo Ronghuan as commissar.

=== Deployments ===
- Northeast Field Army – Lin Biao, Luo Ronghuan (commissar)
  - 1st Army – Xiao Jinguang
    - 6th Column – Hong Xuezhi, Huang Yongsheng (acting)
    - 12th Column – Zhong Wei
    - 6th Independent Division – Deng Keming
    - 7th Independent Division – Luo Huasheng
    - 8th Independent Division – Wang Rengui
    - 9th Independent Division – Liao Zhongfu
    - 10th Independent Division – Zhao Donghuan
    - 11th Independent Division – Wang Xiaoming
  - 2nd Army – Cheng Zihua
    - 4th Column – Wu Kehua
    - 11th Column – He Jinnian
    - 4th Rehe Independent Division – Li Daozhi
    - 6th Rehe Independent Division – Han Meicun
  - 1st Column – Li Tianyou
  - 2nd Column – Liu Zhen
  - 3rd Column – Han Xianchu
  - 5th Column – Wan Yi
  - 7th Column – Deng Hua
  - 8th Column – Duan Suquan
  - 9th Column – Zhan Caifang
  - 10th Column – Liang Xingchu
  - 7th Rehe Independent Division – Chen Zongkun
  - 8th Rehe Independent Division – Zhu Jun
  - Rehe Independent Cavalry Division – He Nengbin
  - 1st Independent Division – Guan Songtao
  - 2nd Independent Division – Zuo Ye
  - 3rd Independent Division – Chen Jinyu
  - 4th Independent Division – Wang Ziren
  - 5th Independent Division – Wang Jiashan
  - Field Army Artillery Column – Zhu Rui
  - Field Army Railway Column – Huang Yifeng

=== Republic of China Army ===
All Nationalist forces involved in the battle were under the command of the General Suppression Headquarters of Northeast Garrison, the Nationalist forward supreme command.

=== Deployments ===
- General Suppression Headquarters of Northeast Garrison – Wei Lihuang
  - Hebei-Rehe-Liaoning Command – Du Yuming
    - 8th Army – Zhou Fucheng
      - 53rd Corps – Zhou Fucheng (acting)
      - 207th Division – Dai Pu
      - 53rd Division – Xu Gengyang
      - 2nd Northeast Reserve Column – Mao Zhiquan
    - 9th Army – Liao Yaoxiang
      - 1st Corps – Pan Yukun
      - 3rd Corps – Long Tianwu
      - 6th Corps – Li Tao
      - 49th Corps – Zheng Tingji
      - 71st Corps – Xiang Fengwu
      - 52nd Corps – Liu Yuzhang
      - GHQ Northeast Cavalry Headquarters – Xu Liang
    - 1st Army – Zheng Dongguo
      - 7th Corps – Li Hong
      - 60th Corps – Zeng Zesheng
  - Jinzhou Command – Fan Hanjie
    - 6th Army – Lu Junquan
      - 93rd Corps – Shen Xiangkui
      - 8th Corps – Sheng Jiaxing
      - 184th Division – Yang Chaolun
      - 79th Division – Chen Heng
      - 62nd Division – Liu Zigao
    - 5th Corps – Liu Yunhan
    - 54th Corps – Que Hanqian
  - Huludao Command – Chen Tie
    - 17th Army – Hou Jingru
      - 62nd Corps – Lin Weitao
      - 92nd Corps – Huang Xiang
      - 39th Corps – Wang Boxun
      - 95th Independent Division – Zhu Zhiyi

== Communist advance (12 September – 20 October) ==
=== Jinzhou ===
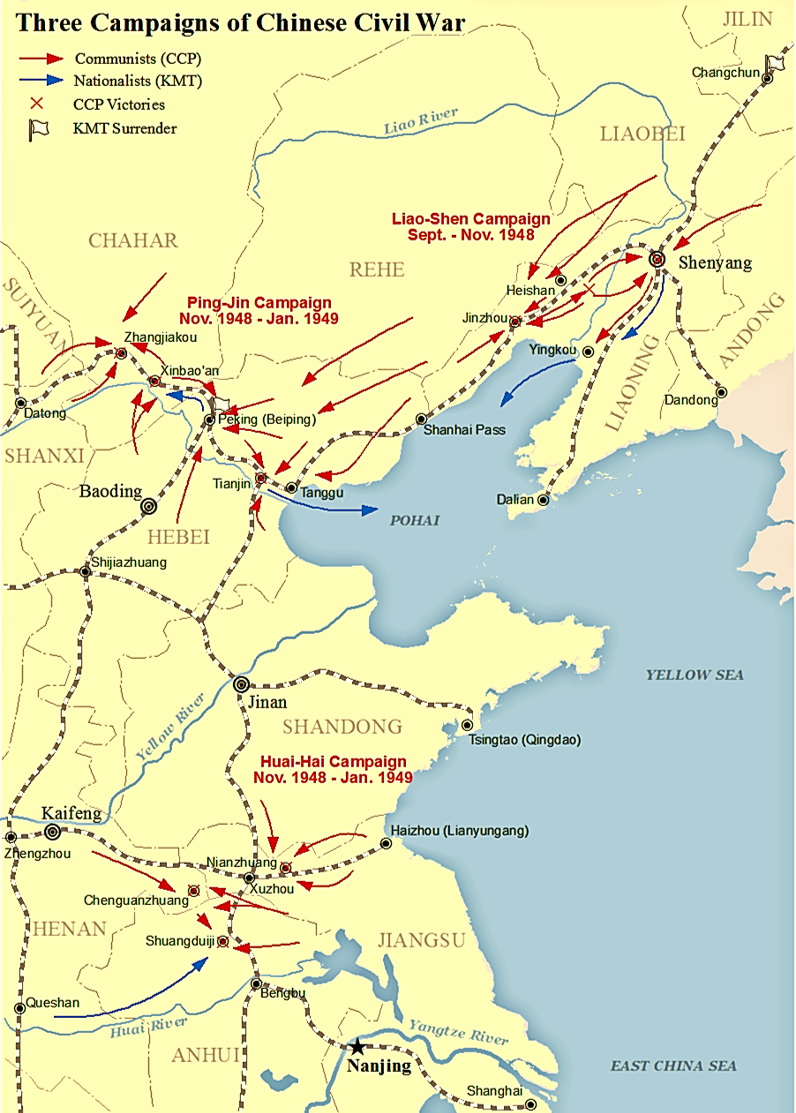
Map showing the Liaoshen campaign as one of the three campaigns during the Chinese civil war

Jinzhou was a "key point" in the Liaoxi Corridor, the principal land passage from Manchuria to North China Plain. On 12 September 1948, the Northeast Field Army headed south and launched a series of attacks along the Beijing Railway. Between 12 September to 28 September, the Communist forces maneuvered to cut off Nationalist supply line from Qinhuangdao to Jinzhou. By 28 September, they had captured Suizhong, Changli, Tashan and Yixian, controlling the area between Jinzhou and Qinhuangdao, effectively isolating Jinzhou.

Chiang Kai-shek arrived in Beiping on 30 September and held a military conference with Fu Zuoyi. The Nationalists assembled the 39th, 62nd and 92nd Army led by Hou Jingru to reinforce Jinzhou as part of the "East-Advancing Army Corps", with the objective to fortify Nationalist positions in Huludao. On 2 October, Chiang flew to Shenyang to discuss the formation of the "West-Advancing Army Corps" with Wei Lihuang, and ordered Liao Yaoxiang to reinforce Jinzhou with the 9th Army from the west to break the encirclement attempt of Jinzhou by the CCP. With the new developments in Nationalist strategies, Lin Biao was initially hesitant to continue with Communist offensive against Jinzhou, but he was convinced to carry on with the assault by Mao Zedong.

By 8 October, the Northeast Field Army have amassed 250,000 troops and completed the encirclement of Jinzhou. Between 10 and 15 October, the Nationalist reinforcements for Jinzhou from both the west and the east were closing in on the Communists, but they were decisively stopped in Tashan. The final assault on Jinzhou began on 14 October. The city was captured in the next evening, along with the Nationalist commander Fan Hanjie and 80,000 Nationalist troops.

=== Changchun ===
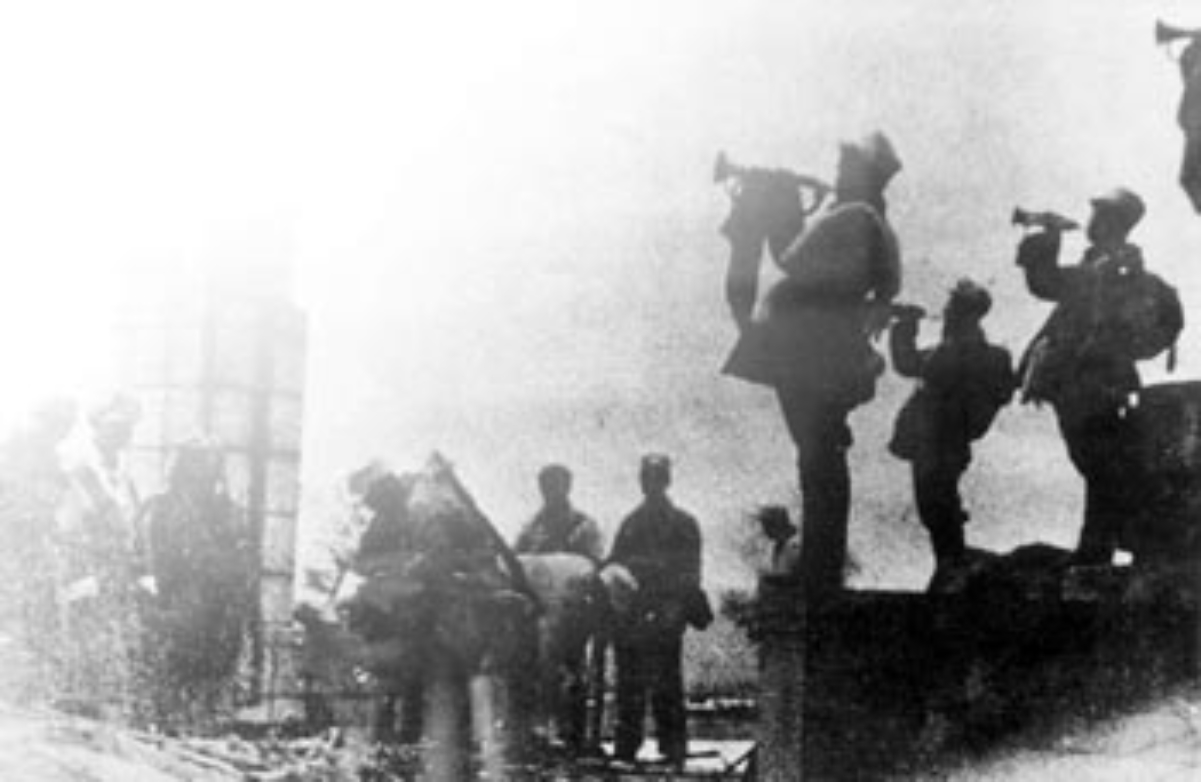
Communist troops after the capture of Changchun

Changchun had been encircled for more than five months prior to the campaign. Already weakened by starvation since February 1948, civilians were fleeing Changchun in large numbers on daily basis by June 1948. Many refugees were unable to pass through the Communist blockade, and unable to return as the Nationalist defenders blocks refugees from returning to the city. The Nationalist garrison were unable to break out of the city despite the order from Chiang. Following the fall of Jinzhou, the Nationalist 60th Army stationed in the east side of the city defected to the Communist side on 17 October. Following their defection, the Nationalist New 7th Army agreed to the terms of surrender on 19 October. The remaining Nationalist forces in Changchun surrendered the city to the PLA on 23 October, and Nationalist commander Zheng Dongguo became a prisoner of war.

== Nationalist counter-offensive (21–28 October) ==
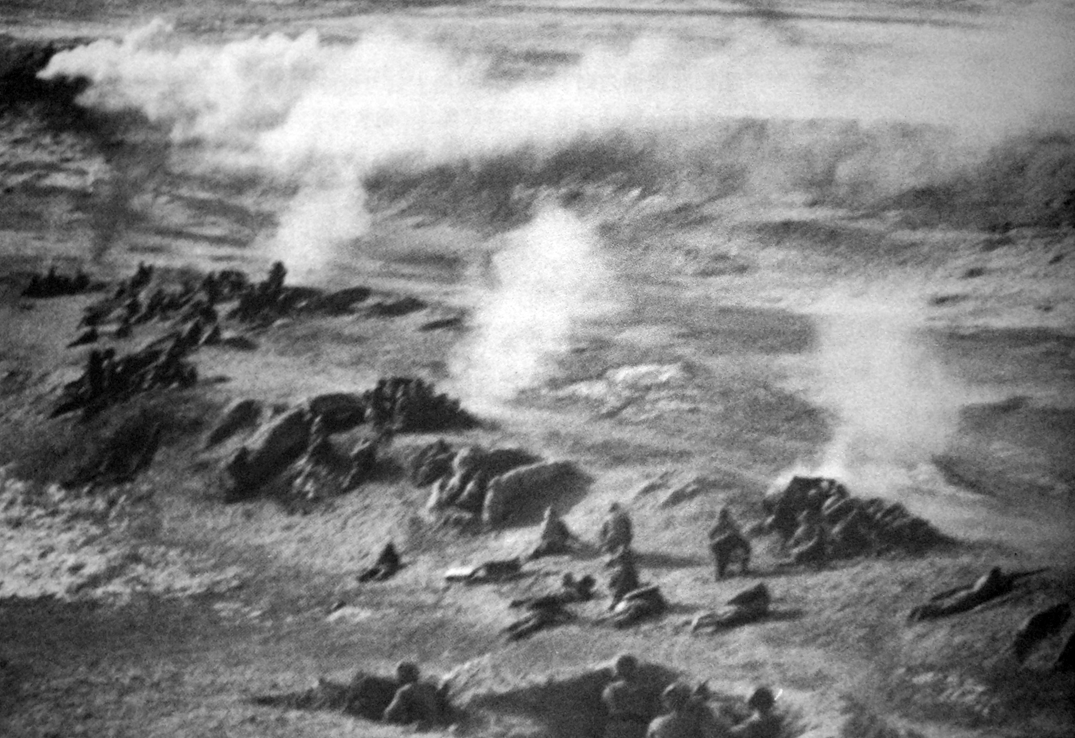
Battle of Heishan

=== Heishan ===
After the Nationalist forces suffered heavy losses in Jinzhou and Changchun, Chiang Kai-shek intended to stage a counteroffensive and quickly recapture Jinzhou. He ordered Liao Yaoxiang and the Ninth Army Group which had been advancing from Shenyang to continue marching west and attack Jinzhou. However, Liao and other senior Nationalist officers contested this decision. On 16 October, the Nationalist high command reached a consensus and decided to attack Heishan and Dahushan instead, covering their withdrawal to Yingkou in the process. The decision was approved by Chiang, and on 21 October the Ninth Army Group launched an attack on Heishan.

The Communist forces successfully defended Heishan and Dahushan, and the Nationalist forces were unable to make any progress. The Ninth Army Group was subsequently encircled by the main forces of the PLA and decisively defeated. Over 25,000 Nationalist soldiers had been killed in action, and Liao Yaoxiang was captured by the PLA.

== Fall of Shenyang (29 October – 2 November) ==
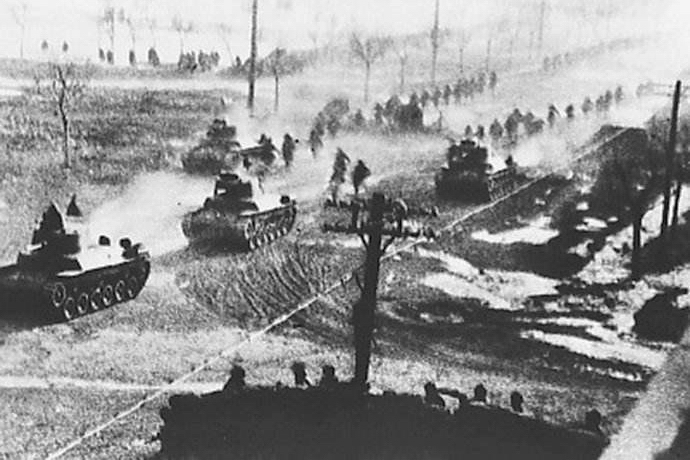
People's Liberation Army troops and Type 97 Chi-Ha tanks advance into Shenyang.

After the Ninth Army Group was destroyed, the Northeast Field Army began to encircle Shenyang on 29 October. As the city fell into disarray, the Nationalist's Eighth Army Group collapsed as the commander Wei Lihuang fled from Shenyang by plane on 30 October. The Communist forces launched the final assault on Shenyang the next morning on 1 November against the Nationalist garrison of 140,000 men, which quickly surrendered soon after. On 2 November, Yingkou was also captured by the Communist forces, with the Nationalist 52nd Army narrowly retreating by ship. The remainder of the Nationalist forces, mostly from the West Army, managed to preserve some of their strength as they withdrew from Huludao to Tianjin. With the Northeast being completely clear of the Nationalist forces, the Liaoshen campaign effectively came to its conclusion.

== Aftermath ==
According to Lew, the Liaoshen campaign was both a major "strategic and tactical defeat" for Chiang Kai-shek and the Nationalist government, as the initial objective of containing the Communists in the Northeast failed after the fall of Jinzhou. Between 1945 and 1948, Chiang committed some of his best troops from the Chinese Expeditionary Force in the Northeast against the CCP, and many of these troops were lost in the subsequent campaigns. The role of Mao Zedong in pushing Lin Biao to fully commit in the final attack of Jinzhou elevated the reputation of Mao in the CCP. With the CCP fully in control of the Northeast, Nationalist garrisons in Beiping and Tianjin led by Fu Zuoyi were now exposed to Communist attacks.

== See also ==
- Outline of the Chinese Civil War
- History of the People's Liberation Army
