= Liang Huasheng =

Chinese general (1904–1999)

- 梁華盛
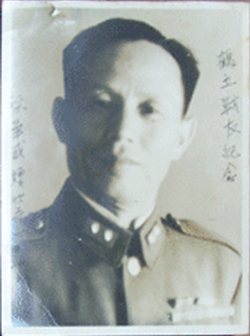
- Liang Huasheng during the Chinese Civil War

Chairman of Jilin Provincial Government
- In office 2 October 1946 – 24 March 1948
- Preceded by: Zheng Daoru
- Succeeded by: Zheng Dongguo

Personal details
- Born: Liang Wenyan; 25 September 1904 Maoming, Guangdong, Qing dynasty
- Died: 2 March 1999 (aged 94) Taipei, Taiwan
- Political party: Kuomintang

Military service
- Allegiance: Republic of China
- Branch/service: (Republic of China (1912–1949)) National Revolutionary Army
- Rank: Lieutenant General
- Battles/wars: Northern Expedition; Central Plains War; Second Sino-Japanese War; Chinese Civil War

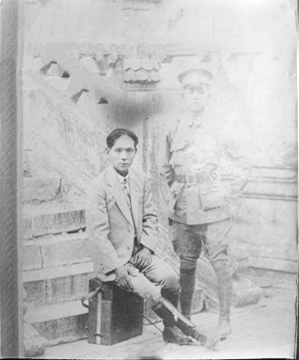
General Liang Huasheng (right) and his father in the 1920s

Liang Huasheng (Chinese: 梁華盛; pinyin: Liáng Huáshèng; Wade–Giles: Liang Hua-sheng; 25 September 1904 – 2 March 1999), formerly known as Liang Wenyan, was a lieutenant general in the Republic of China Army. He served as Chairman of the Jilin Provincial Government and was known as Hua Gong.

== Biography ==
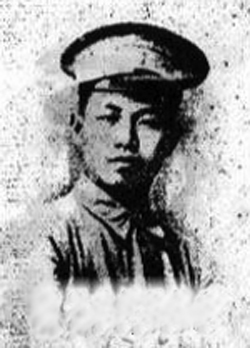
Liang Huasheng during his time at the Whampoa Military Academy

Born in Lidaokeng Village, Yangzhe Township, Maoming, Guangdong Province (now Sishui Town, Gaozhou City). In May 1924, he was admitted to the first batch of Huangpu Army Officer School. In 1925, he joined the National Revolutionary Army and participated in the Eastern Expedition (the crusade against Chen Jiongming). During the Northern Expedition, he was promoted from platoon commander and company commander to regimental commander. In 1930, he served as deputy brigade commander of the 2nd Brigade of the 2nd Division of the National Revolutionary Army and commander of the 4th Regiment, and participated in the Central Plains War. In 1932, he was promoted to commander of the 247th Brigade of the 83rd Division. The following year, he participated in the Defense of the Great Wall of the Inner Mongolian Campaign and faced the Japanese army at Gubeikou and Nantianmen. In September 1933, he was promoted to commander of the 92nd Division of the National Revolutionary Army and participated in the fifth encirclement and suppression of the Chinese Communist Party and the Chinese Workers' and Peasants' Red Army. During the pursuit, he was stationed in Guiyang. In April 1935, he was awarded the rank of Army Major General. In September 1936, he was appointed attached to the Ministry of Military Affairs and entered the third phase of the Army University to study. In the same year, he was appointed as the staff officer of the Chairman's Attendant's Office of the Military Commission.

With the outbreak of the Second Sino-Japanese War, Liang Huasheng served as lieutenant general commander of the 4th Reserve Division (later renamed the 190th Division) and participated in the Battle of Wuhan. In January 1939, he was appointed deputy commander of the 25th Army of the National Revolutionary Army. In July of the same year, he was transferred to the 190th Division as lieutenant general of the 10th Army of the National Revolutionary Army, commander of the 190th Division and commander-in-chief of the South Bank of the Qiantang River. Due to the reorganization of the Ninth Theater, the Tenth Army was replaced by the Eighth Army of the National Revolutionary Army. The commander of the 190th Division was promoted to Yu Jinyuan. Liang Huasheng was transferred to the director of the Political Department of the Fourth Theater on October 14, 1940. In 1942, he returned to his hometown to attend his father's funeral and established Haishan Middle School in his hometown. In 1942, Liang Huasheng was transferred to the captain of the Central Training Corps. He went to Liuzhou to guide the work of the Vietnamese Revolutionary Alliance. More than 800 young people from Vietnam, including Ho Chi Minh, received training in Liang Huasheng's Sino-Vietnamese training class. In the same year, Liang Huasheng was appointed deputy commander-in-chief of the 1st Group Army and became a member of the Chinese Expeditionary Force to fight in Myanmar. In April 1943, he was promoted to deputy commander-in-chief of the 11th Group Army, and concurrently served as the education director of the Cadre Training Group of the Nationalist Government Military Commission in Yunnan, responsible for training the Chinese Expeditionary Force and non-commissioned officers at all levels under the Chinese Army General Headquarters. The training regiment has general classes, combat training classes, automobile and combat vehicle training classes, communications infantry artillery medics and other brigades. It employs American instructors, uses the latest teaching materials, and uses new equipment. The total number of graduated officers and soldiers has reached 50,000. He made great contributions to the reunification of Yunnan and Burma, the opening of international routes, and the successful counterattack of Hunan and Guangxi. In February 1944, Liang Huasheng was transferred to the position of deputy commander-in-chief of the 20th Group Army.

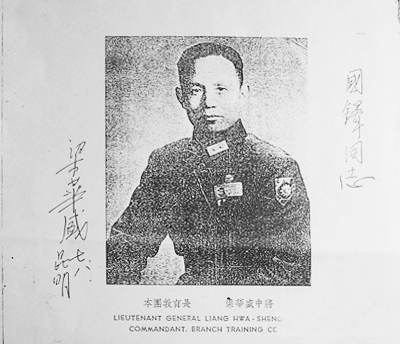
Liang Huasheng at the end of the Second Sino-Japanese War

After the end of the Second Sino-Japanese War, in December 1945, Liang Huasheng went to Northeast China to serve as deputy commander-in-chief of the Northeast Security Command. In June 1946 (the 35th year of the Republic of China), he acted as the chairman of the Jilin Provincial Government and officially took office as the chairman of the Jilin Provincial Government in October of the same year.

In May 1947, he concurrently served as the commander of the Jidong Corps. On July 19, the National Government appointed Liang Huasheng as the chairman of the Jilin Election Office; the National Government also appointed him as a representative of the National Assembly and a legislator of the Legislative Yuan.

In January 1948, he served as deputy commander-in-chief of the Northeast Bandit Suppression Headquarters, director of the Changchun Appeasement Office, and Shenyang Defense Commander. In the Liaoshen campaign, the People's Liberation Army won, and Liang Huasheng escaped from Shenyang and returned south before losing the city. In 1949, he served as deputy director of the Guangdong Provincial Appeasement Office. The Kuomintang was finally defeated in the second civil war between the Kuomintang and the Communist Party, and Liang Huasheng transferred to Taiwan. He successively served as national policy adviser to the Presidential Office and founding president of the Guangdong Province Taiwanese Association and Gaolei Association. In 1969, he retired from service. He served as the Honorary Director of Lu Baoyao Guoqiang Martial Arts Center. Liang Huasheng died on March 2, 1999, at the age of 96.

== Sources ==
- 徐友春主編 (2007). 民国人物大辞典 増訂版 (in Chinese). 河北人民出版社. ISBN 978-7-202-03014-1.徐友春主編 (2007). 民国人物大辞典 増訂版 (in Chinese). 河北人民出版社. ISBN 978-7-202-03014-1.
- 劉国銘主編 (2005). 中国国民党百年人物全書 (in Chinese). 团結出版社. ISBN 7-80214-039-0.劉国銘主編 (2005). 中国国民党百年人物全書 (in Chinese). 团結出版社. ISBN 7-80214-039-0.
- 劉寿林等編 (1995). 民国職官年表 (in Chinese). 中華書局. ISBN 7-101-01320-1.劉寿林等編 (1995). 民国職官年表. 中華書局. ISBN 7-101-01320-1.
- 張發奎口述自傳 中華民國第四任陸軍總司令回憶錄
