= Battle of Tashan =

1948 battle

- Part of the Chinese Civil War
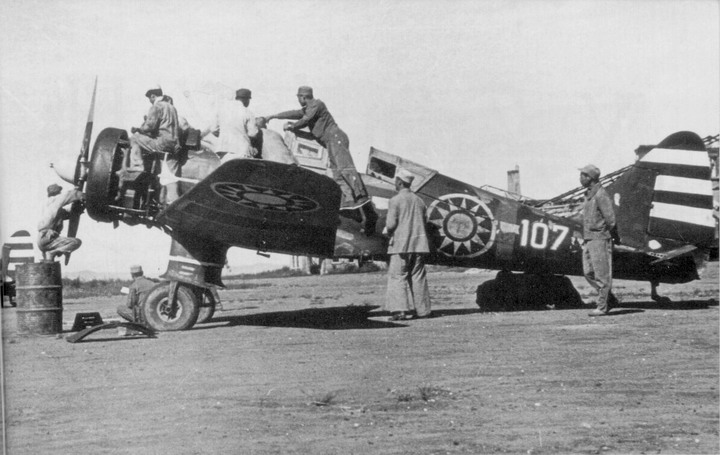
Date	October 10–15, 1948
Location	Liaoning, China
Result	Communist victory

Belligerents
National Revolutionary Army	People's Liberation Army

Commanders and leaders
Que Hanqian (阙汉骞); Luo Qi (罗奇)	Cheng Zihua (程子华)

Strength
95,000	55,000

Casualties and losses
9,549 killed	23,774 (7,878 killed)

The Battle of Tashan (Chinese: 塔山爭奪戰) took place during the Chinese Civil War fought in the western part of Northeast China, between forces of the Kuomintang National Revolutionary Army (NRA) and the communist People's Liberation Army (PLA), and resulted in a PLA victory. The battle was critical in determining the outcome of the Battle of Jinzhou and, consequently, that of the entire Liaoshen Campaign. The battle is more commonly known as the blocking battle at Tashan (Chinese: 塔山阻击战), and is widely regarded by the communists as the first of the three most crucial blocking operations (along with the Battle of Heishan a week later and the Battle of Xudong from the Huaihai Campaign) during the Chinese Civil War.

The name "Tashan" (塔山), literally translated to "Pagoda Mountain", was short for Tashanbao (塔山堡, meaning "Pagoda Mountain fort"). Contrary to its name, there were neither pagoda nor mountains and the only defensive bunkers were the ones hastily built by the communists temporarily for the upcoming battle. The place was actually a village of 100 or so households, some 30 km away from Jinzhou, with the main road to Jinzhou passing directly through the center of the village.

== Prelude ==
After encircling Jinzhou, the communists were facing an incoming Nationalist reinforcement of a total of 11 divisions (not counting the Nationalist air and naval assets), and were well aware of the importance of stopping Nationalist reinforcements from reaching Jinzhou. The PLA deployed a total of eight divisions and an artillery brigade at Tashan, with Cheng Zihua (程子华), the commander of the Northeast Field Army's 2nd Corps, in charge. In order to better assist local commanders, Luo Ronghuan got approval from Lin Biao to send Su Jing (苏静), a senior staff officer at general headquarters of the communist force in Northeast China, to Tashan.

However, the local communist commanders, especially those of 4th Column, resented Luo Ronghuan’s decision to send Su Jing. After he arrived at the headquarters of 4th Column, they jokingly referred to him as the equivalent of an ancient Chinese imperial army overseer, feeling that Luo Ronghuan and Lin Biao were doubtful they were competent enough to accomplish their assigned mission. Eventually, the political commissar of the 4th Column, Mo Wenhua (莫文骅), was able to resolve the issue and the communists avoided the kind of factional disputes that the nationalists had.

== Order of battle ==
Attackers: National Revolutionary Army (Nationalist) order of battle:

- The 54th Army (3 divisions)
- The 62nd Army (3 divisions)
- 2 divisions from the 39th Army
- 21st Division of the 92nd Army
- The 62nd Division
- The Independent 95th Division
- Naval and air assets

Defenders: People's Liberation Army (Communist) order of battle:

- The 4th Column (3 divisions)
- The 11th Column (3 divisions)
- Rehe Independent 4th Division
- Rehe Independent 6th Division
- An artillery brigade

== Battle ==
The battle started before dawn on October 10, 1948, at 3:00 AM, with the Nationalists successfully launching a surprise attack with numerical and technical superiority, taking the Fishing Mountain (Da Yu Shan,打鱼山)Island at low tide. Da Yu Shan Island was a critical position, in that whoever controlled the islands would threaten the flank of Tashan. The grave danger was realized by the commander of the communist 4th Column, Wu Kehua (吴克华), who immediately ordered a counterattack to retake the island. The mission was successfully accomplished, and the island remained firmly in communist hands for the remainder of the battle.

Although Nationalist aircraft dropped over 5,000 heavy bombs on communist positions—which were also pounded by Nationalist naval shelling—the attack was not well coordinated because Nationalist commanders on the ground lacked the authority to command air and naval assets, which were under the direct control of Chiang Kai-shek and his high command. As a result, the communists were able to dig in underground without suffering significant casualties, despite most of their fortifications above the ground being demolished by Nationalist attacks from air and sea. Despite Nationalist encouragements including a half-million-dollar incentive reward for each troop, repeated Nationalist charges against communist positions were beaten back—the communists even at one point used Nationalist corpses to improvise temporary fortifications, which proved to be a psychological shock to the attacking Nationalist troops. As a result, the Nationalists were unable to advance any further towards Jinzhou.

On October 15 the news of the fall of Jinzhou had reached Nationalist reinforcements at Tashan. Realizing there was no longer any reason for further attack, and fearful of an all-out counterattack by the communists—who now had additional troops freed up from the conquest of Jinzhou to reinforce Tashan—the Nationalists made a hasty retreat at noon, leaving behind a total of 6,549 killed. The battle concluded with a victory for the communists, whose casualties included 7,827 killed, 15,922 wounded, three captured and 22 missing.

== Outcome ==
The communists' successful repelling of Nationalist forces at Tashan was one of the most important factors contributing to the Nationalist loss in the Battle of Jinzhou, and consequently the nationalist defeat in the Liaoshen Campaign. It could be argued that the Nationalist failure had much more to do with internal power struggles and factional problems among themselves, and Chiang Kai-shek, the Nationalist generalissimo, came in for some blame. The communists would have had little chance of stopping Nationalist reinforcements if Wei Lihuang’s original battle plan had been carried out by the capable commander, Chen Tie (陈铁), Wei Lihuang’s deputy. Putting the deputy commander-in-chief in command illustrated that the local Nationalists realized the importance of this battle, but such moves were completely negated by the Nationalist supreme commander himself. Chiang Kai-shek selected Que Hanqian (阙汉骞) to replace Chen Tie, and Que Hanqian was directly commanded by Chiang, not taking orders from Wei Lihuang; because of this, the original Nationalist plan was ruined. Chiang’s move also alienated other Nationalists in Northeast China, who felt that he did not trust them and judged them incompetent. As a result, they lost the incentive to work with Que Hanqian, because if he achieved success in defeating the communists, it would only strengthen Chiang’s original negative opinion of them. The commander of the Nationalist 62nd Army, Lin Weichou (林伟俦), had openly clashed with Que Hanqian and refused to take orders from him.

It wasn't only the commanders sent by Chiang Kai-shek who could not get along with the local commanders; they also could not get along with each other. Que Hanqian was constantly interfered with by Luo Qi (罗奇), the other senior commander was also sent by Chiang, and Luo Qi constantly filed secret reports to Chiang informing on other commanders’ behavior, including Que Hanqian, who was accused by Luo Qi of not being enthusiastic about his mission. It was obvious that Nationalist commanders were not able to effectively conduct operations under such conditions. Not only were the Nationalist frontline commanders unable to effectively command their army units, they were also completely incapable of directing any air and naval assets. Chiang had ordered the Nationalist air force and navy to provide support, but without giving any authority to commanders on the ground to use them directly; even Que Hanqian and Luo Qi could not direct air and naval assets without going through Chiang first. As a result, Nationalist naval shelling and air strikes were not coordinated with ground offensives to any great effect. Another reason for ineffective Nationalist air and naval operations was that all Nationalist officers, including Chiang himself, had doubts as to the success of the mission, and the Nationalists were faced with a dilemma: should they risk the few valuable air and naval assets they had to a plausible lost cause (especially when the overall situation in Northeast China would not change for the better even if the battle was won), or should they preserve these resources to be used elsewhere where the Nationalists had brighter prospect? The decision was difficult and certainly limited the usage of these assets.

The personality of the Nationalist commanders was also a contributor factor to their defeat. Hou Jingru (侯镜如) and Hui De’an (惠德安), the commander and deputy commander of the Qinhuangdao-Jinxi garrison, were capable commanders originally tasked to assist Chen Tie. However, despite their excellence, Hou and Hui were extremely loyal and blindly obedient to Chiang Kai-shek and would not voice any complaints regarding their superior's mistakes. This was evidenced by the fact that, after the 21st Division of the NRA 92nd Army under the command of Hou Jingru was annihilated in the Autumn Offensive of 1947 in Northeast China (which was not his fault), Hou did not voice any complaints to his superior Chen Cheng and Chiang. As a capable military commander, Hou Jingru had reached the same conclusion as his superior Chen Cheng: Northeast China was a lost cause for the Nationalists, who would be much better off if they had given up the region and use the freed troops elsewhere where they were in better positions, and recapture the region when things had turned better. However, unlike his outspoken superior Chen Cheng, who openly advocated this idea, Hou kept quiet and faithfully carried on to the end the impossible tasks set by Chiang. Hou had earned Chiang's deep trust, but this would come at a heavy price: when Chiang personally sent two of his senior officers to replace the much more capable Chen Tie, Hou and Hui did not voice their concern regarding two new commanders' incompetence. At the same time, Hou and Hui were also aware of the Nationalist problems they could not solve, and not wanting to be scapegoats for failure, the two chose to wait by not going to help the two new senior commanders, who out of jealousy did not want them to be involved anyway.

The primary reason Chiang Kai-shek decided to intrude on the chain of command by sending two of his own senior officers to take over command of the battle was the result of difference in strategic vision between him and Wei Lihuang, the commander-in-chief of the Nationalist forces in Northeast China. Chiang was still obsessed with holding as much land as long as he possibly could, while Wei Lihuang believed that Nationalists should conserve manpower even if that meant ceding lands temporarily. However, for Chiang and most of the Nationalist high command, surrendering lands was politically unacceptable.

== See also ==
- Outline of the Chinese Civil War
- National Revolutionary Army
- History of the People's Liberation Army
