= Hou Jingru =

Chinese politician (1902–1994)

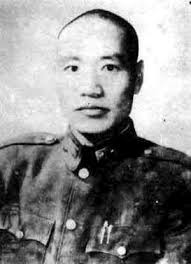
- Born: 17 October 1902; Yongcheng, Henan, Qing China
- Died: 25 October 1994 (aged 92); Beijing, People's Republic of China
- Education: Whampoa Military Academy; Zhengzhou University
- Occupations: Army officer, politician

Hou Jingru (Chinese: 侯镜如; October 17, 1902 – October 25, 1994) was a Chinese army officer and politician, prominent member of the Revolutionary Committee of the Chinese Kuomintang. He notably served as Vice Chairman of the Chinese People's Political Consultative Conference, Counsellor of the State Council, member of the Central Military Commission and President of the China Association for the Promotion of Peaceful Reunification.

Hou is famous as one of the most successful Communist spies lurking in the Nationalist Army. His greatest service to the Communists came in the Battle of Jinzhou, when, as the Nationalist general commanding the 17th Army Group (which included four armies), he deliberately delayed his arrival to Jinzhou by 11 days, leading to the envelopment and destruction of the Nationalist forces.

== Life ==
=== Early years ===
Hou Jingru was born in Yongcheng, Henan, in 1902. In 1924 he graduated from Zhengzhou University (where he studied physics and mathematics) and in 1925 from the Whampoa Military Academy. He fought in the Northern Expedition and sided with the Wuhan Nationalist Government, for which he was arrested and briefly imprisoned, but was eventually released. His contacts with the Chinese Communist Party date to 1925, when he met Zhou Enlai.

Beginning in 1932, he served as chief of staff of the 30th Division of the 30th Army of the National Revolutionary Army, and then commander of the 89th Brigade of the 30th Division. In April 1935, the Nationalist Government of Chiang Kai-shek awarded Hou Jingru the rank of major general in the army, and he was given command of the 30th Division of the 30th Army of the National Revolutionary Army.

=== War against Japan ===
In 1937, the Second Sino-Japanese War broke out. Because of his outstanding performance in the Battle of Xinkou, Hou Jingru was promoted to Chief of Staff of the 91st Army . At the beginning of 1938, he was transferred to command the 21st Division and fought in the battles of Taierzhuang, Wuhan and Zaoyi. In 1943, he was promoted to commander of the 92nd Army, and awarded the rank of lieutenant general, leading his troops to participate in the Battle of West Hunan.

=== The Civil War ===
During the Chinese Civil War, Hou Jingru notably served as the commander of the Peking Garrison, from 1946 to 1948. In 1948, he was promoted to commander of the 17th Army Group. During the Battle of Jinzhou, when the defenders of Jinzhou were in desperate situation, and Chiang Kai-shek ordered the four armies under the command of Hou Jingru to immediately rush to Jinzhou, Hou Jingru deliberately slowed down and delayed 11 days before leading the troops to arrive. As a result, the Nationalists were decisively defeated in the Battle of Jinzhou.

=== People's Republic of China ===
In 1949, Hou Jingru went to Hong Kong, supposedly to visit his mother who was living there, although probably he was involved in United Front work and instigating defections to the Communists among Nationalists in the city whose loyalty wavered. In July 1952, Hou returned to China and was appointed by Mao Zedong as Counsellor of the State Council and a member of the Central Military Commission. In May 1955, Hou Jingru joined the Central Committee of the Revolutionary Committee of the Chinese Kuomintang (RCCK), later becoming Vice Chairman of RCCK. He also served as the President of the China Association for the Promotion of Peaceful Reunification.

From March 1989 until his death five years later, he was Vice Chairman of the Chinese People's Political Consultative Conference.
