= Siege of Changchun =

Siege during the Chinese Civil War (1948)

- Part of the Liaoshen Campaign of the Chinese Civil War
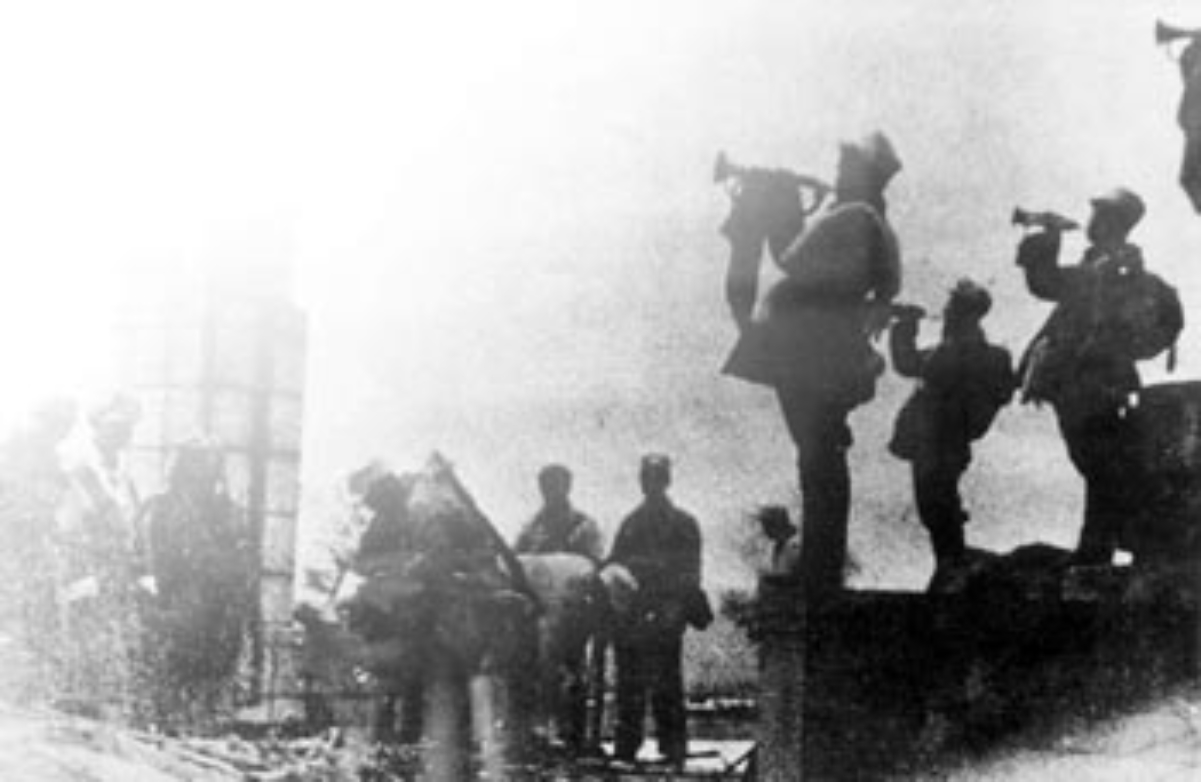
- Changchun after the siege
Date	23 May – 19 October 1948 (4 months, 3 weeks and 5 days)
Location	Changchun and proximity, China 43.8171°N 125.3235°E
Result	Communist victory
Territorial changes	People's Liberation Army captures Changchun

Belligerents
Republic of China Army: 60th Army; New Seventh Army	People's Liberation Army: Northeast Field Army; North China Field Army

Commanders and leaders
Zheng Dongguo (surrendered)	Lin Biao; Xiao Jinguang

Strength
~100,000	100,000

Casualties and losses
15,000	16,078
- ~150,000–200,000 civilian deaths due to starvation
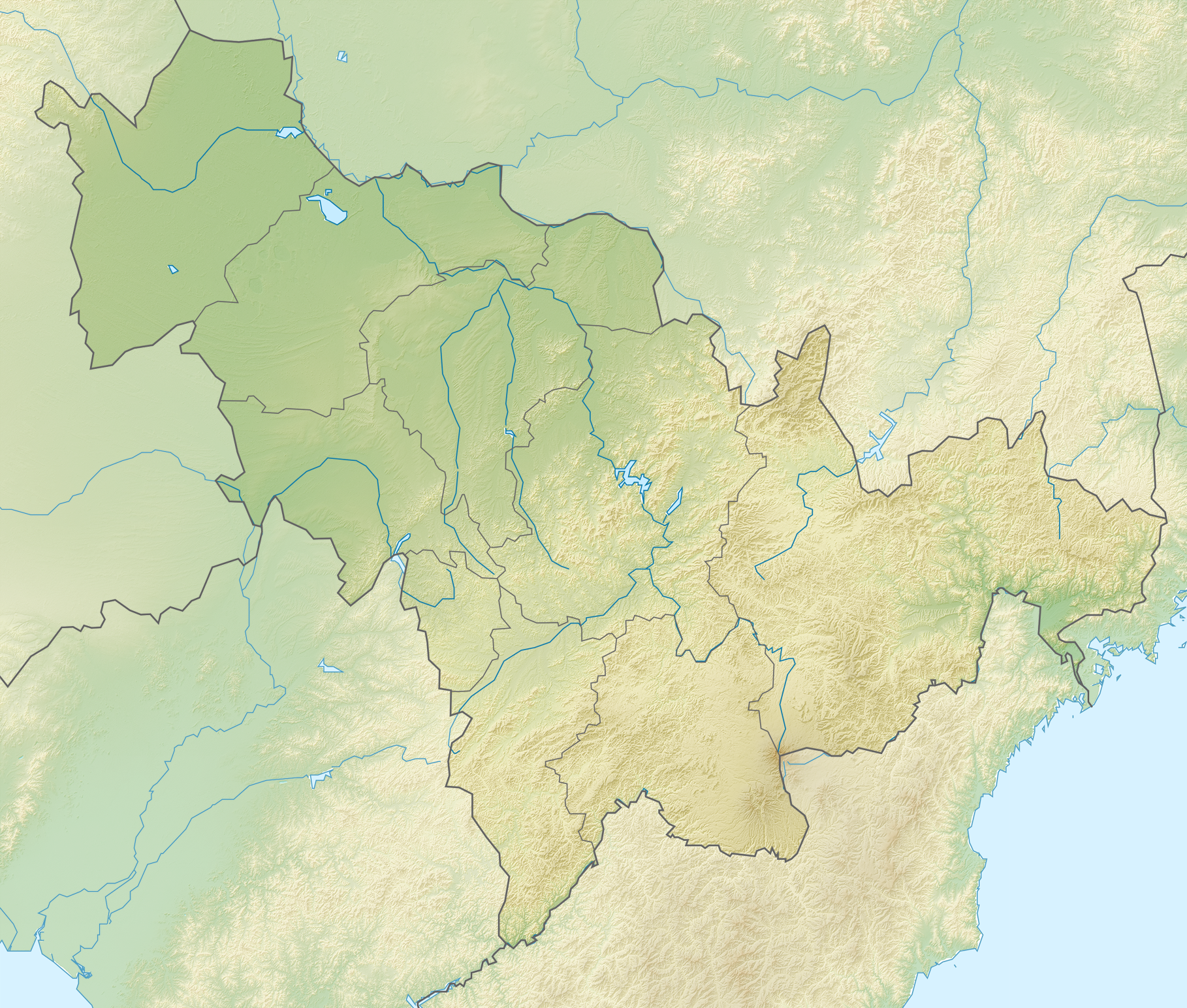
- Location within Jilin Siege of Changchun (China)

Siege of Changchun
- Traditional Chinese: 長春圍困戰
- Simplified Chinese: 长春围困战
Transcriptions
Standard Mandarin
- Hanyu Pinyin: Chángchūn Wéikùnzhàn

The siege of Changchun was a military blockade undertaken by the People's Liberation Army against Changchun between May and October 1948, the largest city in Manchuria at the time, and one of the headquarters of the Republic of China Army in Northeast China. It was one of the longest campaigns in the Liaoshen Campaign of the Chinese Civil War.

== Background ==
Immediately after the end of the Second Sino-Japanese War, the civil war between the ruling Kuomintang (KMT) and the Chinese Communist Party (CCP) resumed. Manchuria became a focus of the conflict, as both sides tried to gain control of the region. Changchun in particular was of strategic importance as it was the provincial capital of Jilin, and was previously the capital of Manchukuo and the headquarters for the Japanese Kwantung Army during the Second Sino-Japanese War. The city was developed by the Japanese as an "ideal modern city" during their occupation.

After the end of the Second Sino-Japanese War, the Soviet Union invaded and took control of Manchuria. After the Soviet withdrawal, both the KMT and the CCP began to move toward the northeast to expand their sphere of influence. The KMT Nationalist government secured a series of victories against the Communists in the early stages of their campaigns in Manchuria, regaining control of Changchun by 23 May 1946. The KMT momentum was stopped, however, as Chiang Kai-shek declared a ceasefire with the CCP on 6 June. The ceasefire allowed the CCP to recover from their losses. By mid-March 1948, the CCP managed to capture most parts of Manchuria, isolating the KMT forces in small pockets concentrated in the cities of Shenyang, Changchun and Jinzhou.

== Preparations ==
During the winter offensive of 1947, the Communist commander in the Northeast, Lin Biao, was presented with three options to attack first for the general offensives against Nationalist forces in Manchuria. The three options were Changchun, Shenyang or Jinzhou. After discussing with other CCP officers, Changchun was chosen as the first target. The city of Siping was captured by the Northeast Field Army in March 1948, which cleared the path for the Communist forces to march toward Changchun. As the city defense network was well established in Changchun, the siege of the city by the Northeast Field Army was personally called off by Lin Biao several times. As Lin was a "perfectionist with regards to logistics", he was concerned that by concentrating Communist forces in encircling Nationalist defenders in Changchun and Shenyang, these maneuvers would "hold up" forces and would negatively influence the overall Communist campaign in the Northeast.

== Establishment ==
The Nationalist defenders in Changchun, which consisted of the 60th Army and the New Seventh Army, had been suffering from poor morale since the winter of 1947. Beginning on 23 May 1948, the Northeast Field Army under the command of Lin Biao reached the outskirts of Changchun and began encircling the city. Soon after, Changchun was cut off from the rest of the Nationalist-held areas in the Northeast. The closest Nationalist military strength nearby was the Sixth Army led by Fan Hanjie, which were located in Jinzhou. To prevent supplies being airlifted to Changchun, siege commander Xiao Jinguang captured Dafangshen Airport, blasted craters in its runway, and heavily defended the airport. The Nationalist government attempted to airdrop supplies to the city, which was only successful to a limited extent due to increasing Communist anti-aircraft presence in the proximity. The military blockade would last for 150 days, with a large percentage of civilian population having perished in the process.

Inside the city of Changchun, the increasingly-difficult food ration led to conflicts between the Nationalist 60th Army and the New Seventh Army, as the latter was accused of receiving favored status over airdrop of supplies. The Communist forces utilized the situation to encourage Nationalist soldiers to defect to the Communists, and 13,700 Nationalist soldiers had done so by mid-September. After the fall of Jinzhou to the Communists on 14 October, the Communists' siege of Changchun quickly intensified. On the evening of 16 October, the Nationalist 60th Army officially switched side to the Communists and began attacking the New Seventh Army from their position in the city. Zheng Dongguo was reluctant to surrender, but the officers of the New Seventh Army had already reached an agreement with the Communists, and the New Seventh Army eventually laid down their weapons on 20 October.

== Aftermath ==
For the Nationalist government, the fall of Changchun made it clear that the KMT was no longer able to hold on to Manchuria. The city of Shenyang and the rest of Manchuria were quickly defeated by the PLA. The siege warfare employed by the PLA throughout the campaigns in the Northeast was highly successful, which reduced a significant number of ROCA troops and altered the balance of power.

The number of civilian deaths has been estimated at 150,000. The PLA prevented civilians from leaving the city to exhaust the food supply of the ROCA defenders, which resulted in "tens of thousands people starv[ing] to death". The PLA continued to prevent civilian refugees from leaving the city until early August. In the end, around 150,000 refugees successfully left Changchun, although some of these were sent back into the city as agents or spies to counter the claim that the Communists were deliberately starving the civilian population. Changchun being not politically connected to either the KMT or the CCP was arguably one of the reasons behind the poor treatment of civilians. According to Harold M. Tanner, the high civilian casualties from the Siege of Changchun "casts a shadow" over the legitimacy of the Chinese Communist Party. The civilian casualties were widely unknown to the Chinese public until the release of the book White Snow, Red Blood in 1989, which has since been censored by the Chinese government.

== See also ==
- Outline of the Chinese Civil War
