= Zeng Zesheng =

Chinese military officer who fought in Korea

Lieutenant General Zeng Zesheng
- 曾泽生
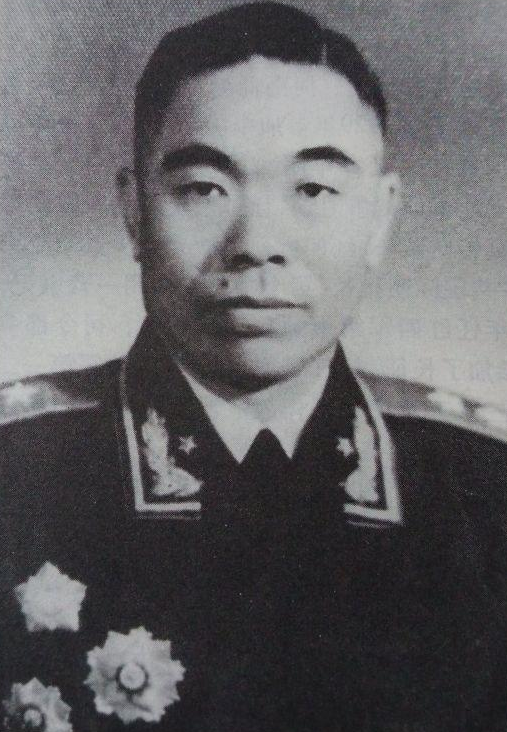
- Zeng in 1955

Personal details
- Born: October 1902 Yongshan County, Yunnan, Qing China
- Died: 22 February 1973 (aged 70) Beijing, China

Military service
- Allegiance: Republic of China; People's Republic of China
- Branch/service: People's Liberation Army (1948–1968); National Revolutionary Army (1922–1948)
- Years of service: 1922–1968
- Rank: Lieutenant General (ROC); Lieutenant General (PRC)
- Commands: People's Liberation Army / People's Volunteer Army; 50th Army; National Revolutionary Army; 60th Army; 184th Division; 1085th Regiment of the 184th Division
- Battles/wars: World War II; Second Sino-Japanese War; Battle of Taierzhuang; Chinese Civil War; Siege of Changchun (surrendered); Korean War; First Phase Offensive; Second Phase Offensive

Zeng Zesheng (October 1902 – 22 February 1973) was a Chinese military officer. A graduate of the Whampoa Military Academy, he served in the National Revolutionary Army during the Second Sino-Japanese War. In 1948, as commander of the 60th Corps, he defected to the People's Liberation Army during the Chinese Civil War. After the founding of the People's Republic of China, he led the 50th Corps during the Korean War and was later awarded the rank of Lieutenant General in 1955.

== Early life ==
Zeng was born in October 1902 in Daxing Town in Yongshan County, Yunnan. He graduated from the Yunnan Provincial Middle School in Kunming. In 1922, he joined the machine gun unit of the army of warlord Tang Jiyao. He later entered the Yunnan Military Academy in 1924 and in 1925, he became a squad leader at the Whampoa Military Academy and joined the Kuomintang (KMT). He later served as a company commander in the Guangdong 20th Division and entered the advanced class at Whampoa in 1927.

== Military career ==
After returning to Yunnan in 1929 at the invitation of then governor Long Yun, Zeng helped establish a reserve officer training unit in Kunming and served as its deputy commander. He later held positions including battalion and regimental commander in the Yunnan clique.

=== World War II ===
In 1937, following the outbreak of the Second Sino-Japanese War, Zeng was appointed commander of the 1085th Regiment within the 184th Division of 60th Army of the National Revolutionary Army. He led his troops in the Battle of Taierzhuang and later took part in major campaigns such as the Battles of Wuhan, Xuzhou and Changsha. In 1944, he was promoted to commander of the 60th Army in Yunnan. From July 1945, to support the counter-offensive of Y Force, Zeng Zesheng, while holding his positions, repeatedly dispatched troops to conduct diversionary attacks against the Japanese army in northern Vietnam, and took Menghong (Yunnan), Bát Xát, and Sa Pa. After Japan's surrender, he led his forces to Vietnam to accept the Japanese surrender on behalf of China.

=== Chinese civil war ===
In 1946, Zeng's 60th Army was transferred to Northeast China, where he served successively as deputy commander of the 4th Pacification Zone, commander of the Jilin Garrison and deputy commander of the First Army Corps under the Nationalist Government. On 16 October 1948, during the Siege of Changchun, he sent Li Zuo as an official representative to carry military plans of the Kuomintang over to the People's Liberation Army (PLA). At 1 a.m. on October 17, Zeng led three divisions of the 60th Army, totaling more than 26,000 soldiers, to defect towards the Communist-controlled eastern areas of Changchun. Following the Communist victory in the aftermath of the siege, the 60th Army was reorganized as the 50th Army of the PLA Fourth Field Army, with Zeng continuing as its commander. Following the establishment of the People's Republic of China in 1949, Zeng participated in the battles in capturing of western Hubei and Sichuan. In March 1950, he became a member of the Central-South Military and Political Committee. The CIA, quoting the Wenhui in late May 1950, classified Zeng Zesheng as a "minor official" of the Committee.

On 9 October 1950, the Agency noted the presence of Zhang Zhen's 51st Army "somewhere north of the Yangtze River", of the 55th, 56th, 57th Armies on the Korean border and of general Zeng Zesheng's 50th Army in Manchuria.

=== Korean War ===
In October 1950, Zeng led the 50th Army into Korea as part of the Chinese People's Volunteer Army following Chinese intervention into the war. The 50th Army advanced southward along the western flank of the Chinese Communist Forces (CCF) and served as a reserve unit during the CCF's First Phase Offensive. It played a key role in the destruction of the British 1st Battalion of the Royal Ulster Rifles during the Third Battle of Seoul.

In February 1951, the army was virtually annihilated during Operation Thunderbolt, which led to controversy regarding the treatment of former Nationalist POWs who had been conscripted into Communist ranks. The unit was subsequently withdrawn to Manchuria in March 1951 (around March 15) for rest and reorganization.

On 4 July 1951, he led the 50th Army into North Korea for the second time. From October to November 1951, he commanded the army in amphibious operation along the west coast of Korea, capturing Ka-do and Tan-do islands. At the end of 1951, he returned to China to recover from illness. In January 1953, he rejoined the 50th Army upon returning to North Korea. In 1955, following the signing of the Korean Armistice Agreement in 1953, he oversaw the withdrawal of the 50th Army back to China and stationed it in Dandong, China.

In 1955, Zeng was awarded the rank of Lieutenant General.

== Later life ==
During a meeting with Chinese leader Mao Zedong, Zeng expressed his desire to join the Chinese Communist Party. Mao acknowledged Zeng's achievements but advised him not to join the Party. Mao explained that, as a non-Party figure, Zeng would be better placed to communicate with people in Taiwan and the international community, helping them understand "the socialist transformation of China and encouraging support for national reunification." Zeng was elected as a representative to the 1st, 2nd and 3rd National People's Congresses, and member of the Standing Committee of the 3rd and 4th National Committees of the Chinese People's Political Consultative Conference.

Zeng retired from active duty in 1968 due to illness. On 22 February 1973, he died in Beijing at the age of 71. Senior Chinese politicians including Ye Jianying and Hu Yaobang, attended his funeral. Vice Minister of National Defense Xiao Jinguang delivered the eulogy on behalf of the Central Committee of the Communist Party, the State Council and the Central Military Commission, praising Zeng's life.

== Personal life ==
Zeng married Li Lusheng in 1930. The couple had four sons and two daughters. Zeng's son, Zeng Daren, served as a senior engineer with the People's Liberation Army Navy where he led the development of China's first deep-sea tracked cable laying machine.

== Awards and decorations ==
- Order of Liberation, 1st class (China)
- Order of the National Flag, 1st class (North Korea)

== Bibliography ==
- Appleman, Roy (1990b), Ridgway Duels for Korea, vol. 18, College Station, TX: Texas A and M University Military History Series, ISBN 0-89096-432-7
- Chinese Military Science Academy (2000), History of War to Resist America and Aid Korea (抗美援朝战争史) (in Chinese), vol. II, Beijing: Chinese Military Science Academy Publishing House, ISBN 7-80137-392-8
- Millett, Allan R. (2010), The War for Korea, 1950–1951: They Came From the North, Lawrence, KS: University Press of Kansas, ISBN 978-0-7006-1709-8
- Spurr, Russell (1988), Enter the Dragon: China's Undeclared War Against the U.S. in Korea 1950–51, New York, NY: Newmarket Press, ISBN 1-55704-008-7
