= Luo Dongjin =

Chinese general

- 罗东进

Deputy Political Commissar of the PLA Second Artillery Corps
- In office November 1997 – November 2002
- Political Commissar: Zhang Haiyang

Personal details
- Born: February 12, 1939 (age 87) Hengdong County, Hunan, China
- Party: Chinese Communist Party
- Spouse: Pan Zhongwen
- Children: 2
- Parent(s): Luo Ronghuan; Lin Yueqin
- Education: National University of Defense Technology

Military service
- Allegiance: People's Republic of China
- Branch/service: People's Liberation Army Ground Force
- Years of service: 1959-2000
- Rank: Lieutenant general

Chinese name
- Traditional Chinese: 羅東進
- Simplified Chinese: 罗东进
Transcriptions
Standard Mandarin
- Hanyu Pinyin: Luó Dōngjìn

Luo Dongjin (Chinese: 罗东进; born February 12, 1939) is a lieutenant general (zhongjiang) in the People's Liberation Army. He was Deputy Political Commissar of the PLA Second Artillery Corps between November 1997 and November 2002. He was promoted to the rank of major general (shaojiang) in September 1998 and lieutenant general (zhongjiang) in July 1999.

== Early life and education ==
Luo was born in Hengdong County, Hunan, on February 12, 1939, to Luo Ronghuan, a Communist military leader, and Lin Yueqin, an educator. He is the third of six children, the others being: Luo Beitun, Luo Lin, Luo Nanxia, Luo Beijie, and Luo Ning. In 1959 he entered the Harbin Institute of Military Engineering (now National University of Defense Technology), majoring in missile engineering, where he graduated in 1965.

== Career ==
He enlisted in the People's Liberation Army (PLA) in 1959. After university, he was assigned to the Seventh Ministry of Machinery Industry as a researcher. He served in the PLA Second Artillery Corps since 1976, what he was promoted to Political Commissar of its Logistics Department in June 1990 and to Deputy Political Commissar in November 1997.

He was a delegate to the 6th National People's Congress. He was a member of the 11th National Committee of the Chinese People's Political Consultative Conference.

== Personal life ==
He married Pan Zhongwen (潘仲文), a military officer in the General Political Department of the People's Liberation Army. The couple has a son and a daughter.

== Book ==
- Luo Dongjin (2003). 我的父亲罗荣桓 [My Father Luo Ronghuan] (in Chinese). Shenyang, Liaoning: Liaoning People's Publishing House. ISBN 7205054001.
