= Li Zuo (born 1913) =

Chinese military officer who fought in Korea

Senior Colonel Li Zuo
- 李佐
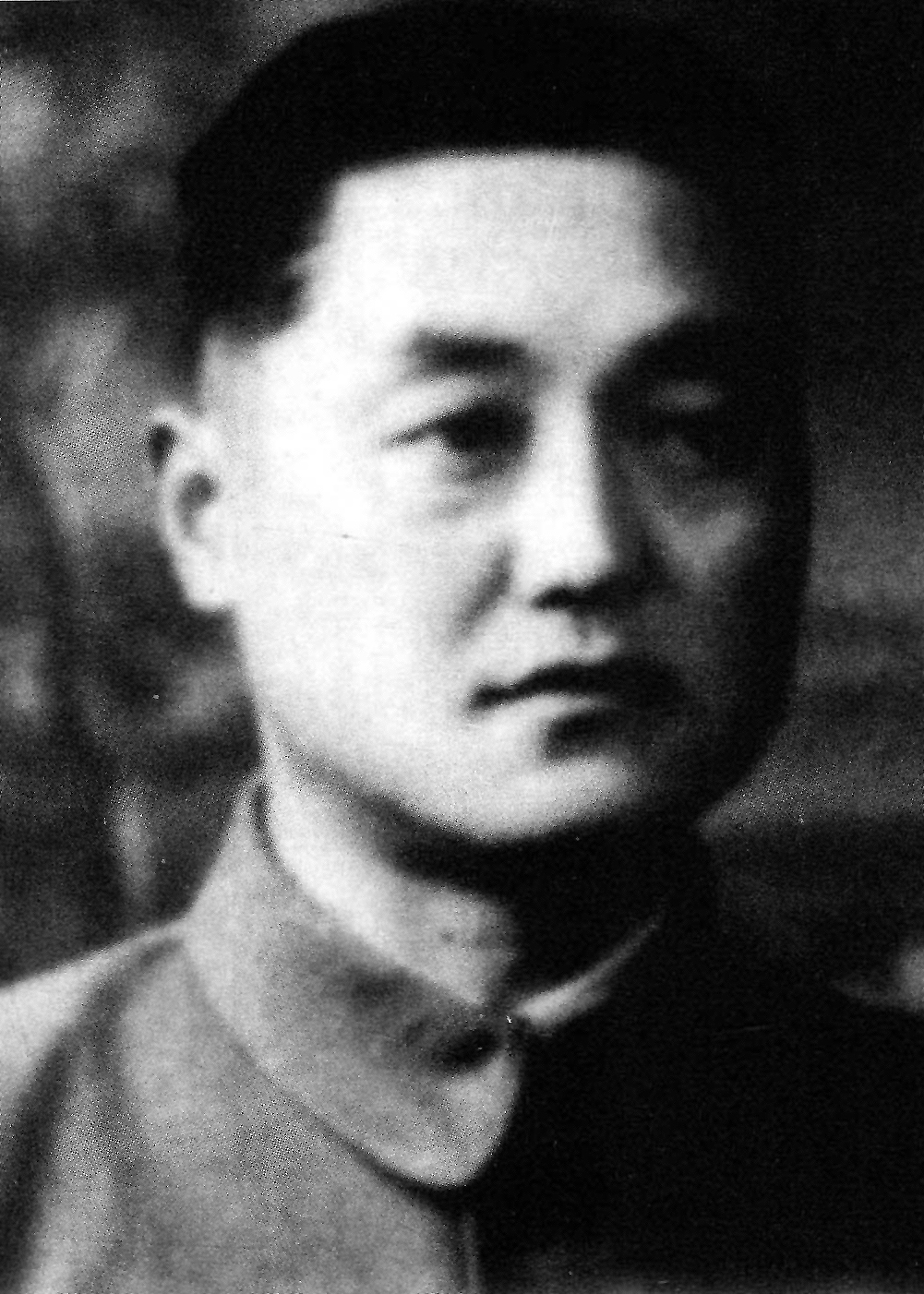
- Li Zuo in the 1950s

Personal details
- Born: January 1913 Yinqiao, Dali, Yunnan, Republic of China
- Died: 21 September 2009 (aged 96) Chengdu, Sichuan, China
- Education: Yunnan Military Academy

Military service
- Allegiance: Republic of China; People's Republic of China
- Branch/service: People's Liberation Army (1948–1981); National Revolutionary Army (1929–1948)
- Years of service: 1929–1981
- Rank: Colonel (ROC); Senior Colonel (PRC)
- Commands: 150th Division (50th Army)
- Battles/wars: World War II; Second Sino-Japanese War; Chinese Civil War; Korean War

Li Zuo (January 1913 – 21 September 2009), also known as Yitan, was a Chinese military officer of Bai ethnicity from Dali, Yunnan Province, who successively participated in the Second Sino-Japanese War, Chinese Civil War and the Korean War. He served as a member of the 5th, 6th, and 7th National Committee of the Chinese People's Political Consultative Conference.

== Biography ==
Li Zuo's ancestral home was Eryuan, but he was born in Yinqiao, Dali. In May 1931, he graduated from the 20th class of the Infantry Department of the Yunnan Military Academy. He served successively as platoon leader and deputy company commander of the 18th Regiment, 9th Brigade, 38th Army of the National Revolutionary Army; company commander of the 3rd Infantry Regiment, 3rd Column, 10th Route Army of the Anti-Japanese Army; and company commander of the Heli Independent Battalion. After the outbreak of the Second Sino-Japanese War, he followed his unit out of Yunnan to fight against the Japanese, serving successively as company commander, battalion commander, regimental commander, and deputy division commander of the 60th Army, participating in the Battle of Xuzhou and the Battle of Wuhan. On October 17, 1948, Li Zuo led his troops in an uprising in Changchun, and after the reorganization, he became the commander of the 150th Division of the 50th Army. In June 1950, he participated in the Korean War, serving as deputy chief of staff of the 50th Army of the Chinese People's Volunteer Army. After returning to China in 1953, he served as deputy commander of the tank division and director of the tank department of the 50th Army, and later as deputy commander of the 50th Army. In September 1955, Li was awarded the rank of Senior Colonel in the Chinese People's Liberation Army. He joined the Chinese Communist Party in March 1956. Li Zuo graduated from the Operations Department of the Nanjing Higher Military Academy in 1962. He subsequently served as deputy director of the Logistics Department of the Chengdu Military Region, Deputy Chief of Staff of the Sichuan Provincial Military Region Headquarters, and deputy director of the Sichuan Provincial People's Government Military Service Bureau. Li retired in November 1981, enjoying the benefits of a deputy corps level officer. In December 1983, he was recognized by the military region as an advanced individual among retired cadres. He passed away on September 21, 2009, at the Chengdu Military Region General Hospital.
