= Ma Shaoxin =

Chinese actor (1936–2022)

- 马绍信
- Born: 1936; Harbin, Japan-occupied Manchukuo, China
- Died: 15 March 2022 (aged 86)
- Occupation: Actor

Ma Shaoxin (Chinese: 马绍信; 1936 – 15 March 2022) was a Chinese actor.

== Biography ==
In 1956, Ma Shaoxin was admitted to the Jixi Mining District Cultural and Art Troupe, and has successively performed in many classic stage plays. In 1991 Ma appeared in the film Decisive Engagement: The Liaoxi-Shenyang Campaign and became the most successful actor playing Lin Biao, causing a huge sensation in the country.

== Selected filmography ==
- Coming Home (归乡) (1983) as Uncle Ba-Liang
- Decisive Engagement: The Liaoxi-Shenyang Campaign (大决战之辽沈战役) (1991) as Lin Biao
- Battle of Kunlun Pass (铁血昆仑关) (1994)
- The Great Military March Forward: Pursue and Wipe Out in the South (人民的巨掌) (1997) as Lin Biao
