= Battle of Jinzhou =

1948 battle of the Chinese Civil War

Battle of Chinchow
- Part of the Liaoshen Campaign of the Chinese Civil War
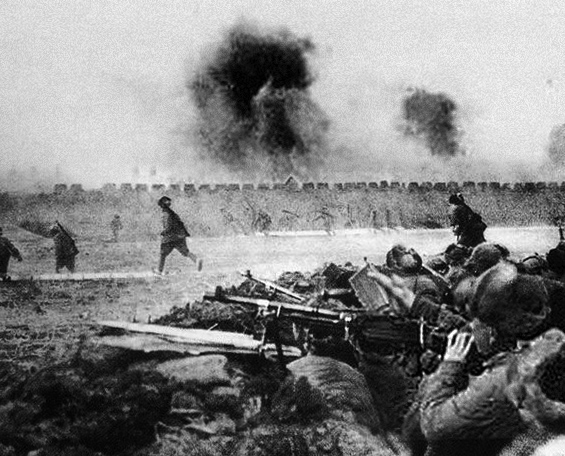
- People's Liberation Army launches final assault on Jinzhou
Date	7–15 October 1948
Location	Chinchow, Liaoning 41.0957°N 121.1258°E
Result	Communist victory

Belligerents
Republic of China Army	People's Liberation Army: Northeast Field Army

Commanders and leaders
Liao Yaoxiang; Fan Hanjie (POW)	Lin Biao; Luo Ronghuan; Liu Yalou

Strength
~150,000	250,000

Casualties and losses
20,000 deaths, 80,000 captured	24,000

Battle of Chinchow (simplified Chinese: 锦州之战; traditional Chinese: 錦州之戰; pinyin: Jǐnzhou Zhīzhàn) took place between the People's Liberation Army and the National Revolutionary Army during the Liaoshen Campaign in the Chinese Civil War. The battle was a turning point in the campaign, which eventually led to capture of Northeast China by the Communist Party.

== Background ==
Chinchow is a key strategic point where the main route from central China through Shanhai Pass enters Manchuria. The fall of Jinzhou to the Communists would allow the Communist to drive into the North China Plain. Mao Zedong addressed the importance of capturing Jinzhou in a telegram to the Communist commanders in the Northeast, saying that the key to the success of the entire Liaoshen Campaign is "to strive to capture Jinzhou in one week."

== Outside the city ==
To attack Chinchow, it was necessary for the PLA to clear away the Nationalist positions in the outskirts of Jinzhou. Between 8 and 13 October, the Communists captured all the Nationalist strongholds outside Jinzhou, which set up the final assault on 14 October. In the meantime, in the Battle of Tashan nine PLA divisions defeated eleven NRA divisions attempting to reinforce Jinzhou.

== Final assault ==
The PLA massed 900 artillery pieces, and launched the final assault on Chinchow on 14 October 1948. The entire defensive line of Jinzhou was broken through soon after. Nationalist resistance ended the next day on 15 October.

== See also ==
- Outline of the Chinese Civil War
- History of the People's Liberation Army
