= Counsellors' Office =

Government think tank of China

Counsellors' Office of the State Council
- 国务院参事室
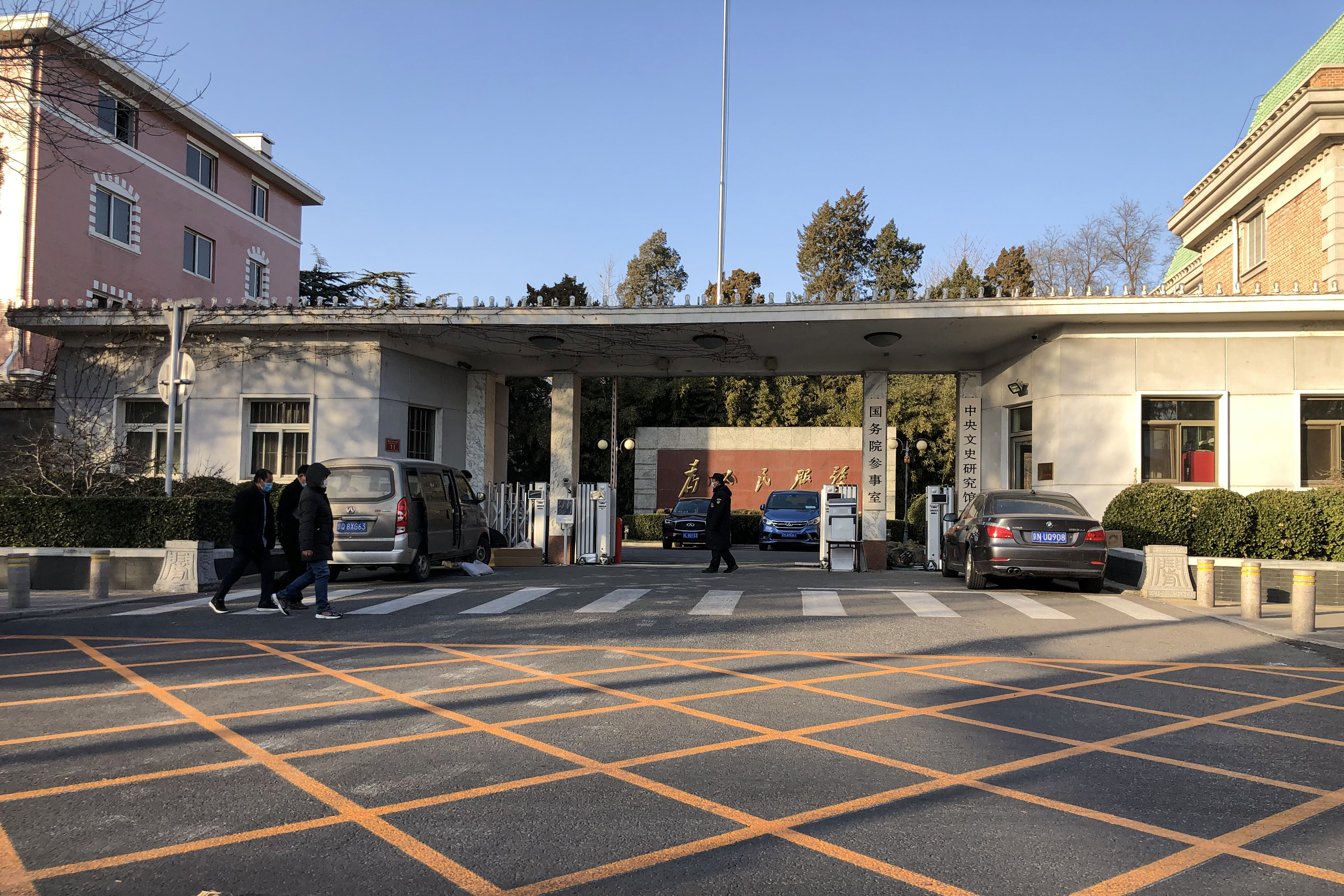
- Counsellors' Office

Agency overview
- Formed: September 1954; 71 years ago
- Jurisdiction: China
- Headquarters: 11 Qianmen East Street, Dongcheng District, Beijing
- Agency executive: Gao Yu, Director
- Parent agency: State Council
- Website: english.counsellor.gov.cn

The Counsellors' Office of the State Council (Chinese: 国务院参事室) is an advisory agency directly under the State Council of People's Republic of China. The Central Institute of Culture and History (Chinese: 中央文史研究所) is a research institute led by the same leadership and located in the same building. They are regarded as the official government think tanks.

== Members ==
The counsellors and the researchers are appointed by the Premier of the State Council.

=== Leadership ===
The Office is led by a Chairman Wang Zhongwei, joined by three Vice Chairmen: Wang Weimin, Zhao Bing, Zhang Yantong. The institute is led by a President: Yuan Xingpei, with a Vice President: Feng Yuan

=== Directors ===
Name	Chinese name	Took office	Left office	Ref.
Guo Chuntao	郭春涛	16 December 1949	30 June 1950	
Liao Luyan	廖鲁言	September 1950	December 1952	
Sun Zhiyuan	孙志远	December 1952	November 1954	
Tao Xijin	陶希晋	November 1954	August 1959	
Zeng Yifan	曾一凡	August 1959	May 1967	
Liu Yi	刘毅	July 1977	July 1982	
Zheng Siyuan	郑思远	February 1983	November 1985	
Wu Qingtong	吴庆彤	November 1985	September 1990	
Chang Jie	常捷	September 1990	December 1996	
Xu Zhijian	徐志坚	December 1996	January 2003	
Cui Zhanfu	崔占福	January 2003	March 2008	
Chen Jinyu	陈进玉	March 2008	June 2015	
Wang Zhongwei	王仲伟	June 2015	May 2021	
Gao Yu	高雨	May 2021	Incumbent	

=== Counsellors ===
Counsellors receive the title of Counsellor of the State Council. There are 56 counsellors:

- Liu Zhiren
- Huang Dangshi
- Xu Songling
- Liu Xiuchen
- Zhu Weijiu
- Zhang Yuanfang
- Zhang Hongtao
- Chen Quansheng
- Wang Guohua
- Cai Keqin
- Li Qingyun
- Liu Yanhua
- Zhang Kangkang
- Xia Bin
- Xu Lin
- Ma Li
- Tang Min
- Liu Huan
- Shi Yinhong
- Xu Yifan
- Deng Xiaohong
- He Xingliang
- Du Xuefang
- Deng Xiaonan
- Lin Yifu
- Du Ying
- Xie Boyang
- Li Yuguang
- Zhang Yuping
- Lin Yongjun
- Qian Yingyi
- Qiu Baoxing
- Fang Ning
- Wang Jingsheng
- Zhen Zhen
- Wang Huiyao
- Zhang Hongwu
- Yang Zhongqi
- Fan Xi’an
- Li Wu
- He Xiurong
- Shi Yong
- He Maochun
- Ke Jinhua
- Xu Shuyu
- Hu Peiyuan

=== Research Fellows ===
Research Fellows are members of the Counsellors' Office. There are 23 fellows:

- Tan Xiaoying
- Xu Xiaodong
- Wang Zhan
- Cai Laixing
- Cai Wanghuai
- Yao Jingyuan
- Li Kenong
- Feng Zhijun
- Wang Jingxia
- Yu Liang
- Yu Dan
- He Jiankun
- Li Chunyou
- Wang Dongjin
- Che Shujian
- Zhang Xinsheng
- Hu Heli
- Yang Limin
- Yin Chengjie
- Zhang Yuxiang
- Wu Yin
- Bao Hong
- Xi Jieying
- Yao Hong
- Tao Dawei
- Cao Erbao
- Bian Zhenjia
- Huang Yi
- Xie Weihe
- Xu Dingming
- Qin Xiaoming
- Huang Yao

=== Researchers ===
Researchers are members of the Central Institute of Culture and History. There are 59 researchers:

- Sun Ji
- Cheng Yizhong
- Chen Yaoguang
- Hou Dechang
- Yang Tianshi
- Du Naisong
- Cheng Xi
- Bai Shaofan
- Huo Da
- Ouyang Zhongshi
- Fu Xinian
- Zhao Rengui
- Shen Peng
- Li Xueqin
- Jin Shangyi
- Shu Yi
- Han Meilin
- Jin Hongjun
- Chen Gaohua
- Jin Moru
- Fan Jinshi
- Yang Yanwen
- Zhang Lichen
- Guo Yizong
- Song Yugui
- Wang Liping
- Xue Yongnian
- Yang Lizhou
- Long Rui
- Pan Gongkai
- Rao Zongyi
- Zi Zhongyun
- Wang Meng
- Li Binghua
- Chen Zuwu
- Nima Zeren
- Zhao Derun
- Cheng Dali
- Dai Yi
- Ma Zhensheng
- Liu Mengxi
- Tao Siyan
- Yang Fujia
- Liang Xiaosheng
- Ye Jiaying
- Wang Yongyan
- Liu Dajun
- Chen Lai
- Wu Jingshan
- Li Yan
- Li Xiaoke
- Li Qiankuan
- Zhang Daning
- Zhong Chengxiang
- An Jiayao
- Tian Qing
- Chen Xiaoguang
- Wu Jiang
- Fan Di’an
- Chen Pingyuan

== See also ==
- Official website
- Official website(in Chinese)
