= Luo Ronghuan =

Chinese military officer (1902–1963)

Yuanshuai Luo Ronghuan
- 罗荣桓
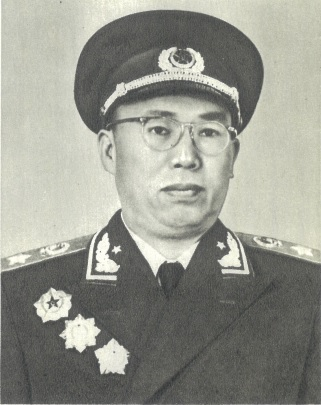
- Luo in 1955

Vice Chairman of the Standing Committee of the National People's Congress
- In office 27 September 1954 – 16 December 1963
- Chairman: Liu Shaoqi; Zhu De

Director of the General Political Department of the People's Liberation Army
- In office January 1961 – December 1963
- Preceded by: Tan Zheng
- Succeeded by: Xiao Hua
- In office September 1954 – December 1956
- Preceded by: Office Established
- Succeeded by: Tan Zheng

Vice Chairman of the National Defense Council (Note: Office was known as the "Vice Chairman of the People's Revolutionary Military Commission" before 29 September 1954.)
- In office 19 June 1954 – 4 January 1965
- Chairman: Mao Zedong

Secretary of the Commission for Discipline Inspection of the Central Military Commission
- In office March 1961 – December 1963
- Preceded by: Office established
- Succeeded by: Tan Zheng
- In office 17 September 1955 – 27 September 1956
- Preceded by: Tan Zheng
- Succeeded by: Xiao Hua

Procurator-General of the Supreme People's Procuratorate
- In office 1 October 1949 – 27 September 1954
- Preceded by: Office established
- Succeeded by: Zhang Dingcheng

Personal details
- Born: 26 November 1902 Hengshan County, Hunan Province, Qing dynasty
- Died: 16 December 1963 (aged 61) Beijing, China
- Occupation: General, politician, writer
- Nickname: 102 (military call sign)

Military service
- Allegiance: Chinese Communist Party
- Branch/service: People's Liberation Army Ground Force
- Years of service: 1927–1963
- Rank: Marshal of the People's Republic of China
- Commands: Political Commissar of the Northeast Field Army, PLA
- Battles/wars: Northern Expedition; Chinese Civil War; Long March; Sino-Japanese War; Hundred Regiments Offensive
- Awards: Order of Bayi (First Class Medal); Order of Independence and Freedom (First Class Medal); Order of Liberation (China) (First Class Medal)

Luo Ronghuan (simplified Chinese: 罗荣桓; traditional Chinese: 羅榮桓; pinyin: Luó Rónghuán; Wade–Giles: Lo Jung-huan; November 26, 1902 – December 16, 1963) was a Marshal of the People's Republic of China. He served as a Vice Chair of the Standing Committee of the National People's Congress.

== Early life ==
Luo, originally named Luo Shenzhen, was born on 26 November 1902 in Nanwan, a village in Hengshan County, Hunan (now part of Hengdong County, Hengyang). While at middle school in Changsha in 1919, he joined protests against the warlord Zhang Jingyao and a boycott of Japanese goods. From 1924 to 1926 he studied commerce in the preparatory course of the private Qingdao University, where he was a leader of the student movement.

In April 1927, Luo enrolled at National Wuchang Sun Yat-sen University and joined the Communist Youth League, soon becoming a member of the CCP. The party sent him to organize peasants in Tongcheng County, Hubei, where in August he led a local uprising. At the end of the month he took about 100 armed peasants to Xiushui, Jiangxi, where they joined the forces of the Autumn Harvest Uprising. After the Sanwan reorganization of the uprising's troops in September 1927, he became party representative of a special-duties company.

== Military career ==
=== Red Army (1927–1937) ===
In 1928, Luo served as a company and then battalion party representative in the Fourth Red Army, and helped to establish the Jinggangshan base area. In 1929 he moved with the army into southern Jiangxi and western Fujian, and he was wounded during an attack on Meixian in October. At the Gutian Conference in December 1929, he was elected to the army's Front Committee. Mao is reported to have said at the conference that Luo was "a talent" and that the party had "discovered this comrade late".

In August 1930 Luo became political commissar and party secretary of the Fourth Red Army, and with its commander, Lin Biao, took part in the unsuccessful attack on Changsha. At the Luofang meeting in November, he supported Mao's strategy of luring Nationalist forces deep into the base area rather than attacking Nanchang. He took part in the first three counter-encirclement campaigns, but after losses of wounded soldiers, prisoners and captured weapons during a withdrawal in 1931, he was removed as party secretary of the army and replaced by Lin.

In March 1932, Luo became director of the political department of the 1st Red Army Group and took part in the Zhangzhou campaign. In 1933 he held political posts in the Jiangxi Military Region and the Red Army's General Political Department, where he directed recruitment. In January 1934 he was elected an alternate member of the Central Executive Committee of the Chinese Soviet Republic.

Luo began the Long March in October 1934 as director of the political department of the 8th Red Army Group. When that unit was disbanded after heavy losses in December, he became an inspector in the General Political Department. He reached northern Shaanxi in 1935 as deputy director of the 1st Army Group's political department. In 1936, he studied at the Red Army University, and in 1937 he became director of the 1st Army Group's political department.

=== Second Sino-Japanese War (1937–1945) ===
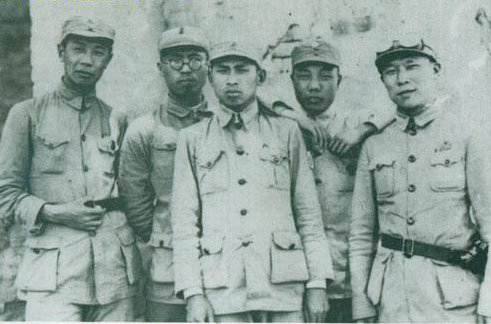
From left: Chen Shiju, Luo, Li Tianyou and Xiao Hua at Xiaoyi, Shanxi, in 1938

When the Red Army was reorganized as the Eighth Route Army in August 1937, Luo became director of the 115th Division's political department. In March 1938 he became the division's political commissar. With its acting commander, Chen Guang, he fought the Japanese at Wucheng and Jinggou and established a base area in the Lüliang Mountains. In December 1938 he and Chen led the division's headquarters and part of its troops east into Shandong. There they fought a series of engagements against Japanese and collaborationist forces in 1939 and 1940. In late 1939 he intervened to stop an "anti-Trotskyist" purge in the Huxi area west of Weishan Lake.

During the Second Sino-Japanese War he served as political commissar of the 115th Division of the Eighth Route Army. The Shaan-Gan-Ning Border Region anti-troskyites campaign extended to other base areas, including Shandong, leading to a frenzied campaign of mass execution of party cadres. This was put to a halt thanks to Luo's intervention in November 1939. This incident reached Yan'an in early 1940, which lead to a reexamination of the anti-trotskyite campaign in Shandong on a meeting convened by Chen Yun. Here, the campaign was criticized as too extremist, although it was maintained that it was correct, which was not enough to stop the deadly campaign, despite Luo's efforts, which saved more than 100 lives, the campaign did not fully end until April 1942, after an inspection by Liu Shaoqi. After Zhu Rui dismissal as political commissar of the Eighth Route Army in Shandong in 1942, he held unified leadership over the government, Party and military in the Shandong area during the war against Japan. He chaired the General Study Committee, where he tried to oppose the Rectification Campaign excesses in Shandong. During his leadership of Shandong the communist forces and territory grew, at the time of China's victory on the war against Japan the CCP controlled most of Shandong strongholds and communication lines, which were vital for communist victory during the Chinese civil war.

In November 1941, when about 50,000 Japanese and collaborationist troops attacked the Communist base in the Yimeng Mountains, Luo led the Shandong party, government and military organs out of the encirclement and then returned to wage guerrilla war in the area. In late 1942 he directed the Jiazishan campaign against the Nationalist 111th Division, after which overwork brought on an illness that caused blood in his urine. In March 1943 he became commander and political commissar of the Shandong Military Region, as well as political commissar and acting commander of the 115th Division. He directed offensives in 1944 and 1945 that expanded the Communist-held areas of Shandong and won over several collaborationist units. After the Japanese surrender in August 1945, his forces took control of most of Shandong, apart from the railway lines and a few county towns in the west. He was also a member of the CCP's 7th Central Committee, elected in 1945.

=== Chinese Civil War (1945–1949) ===
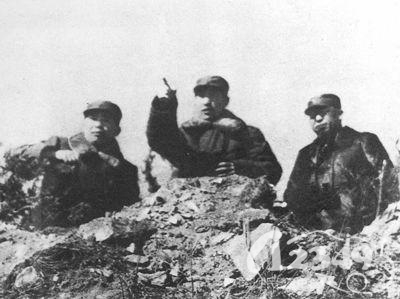
Lin Biao, Luo and Liu Yalou directing operations during the Liaoshen campaign

In October 1945, Luo organized the movement of more than 60,000 Communist troops from Shandong to Northeast China, where he became second political commissar of the Northeast People's Autonomous Army. In early 1946 he was diagnosed with kidney cancer. In June he became deputy secretary of the CCP's Northeast Bureau and deputy political commissar of the Northeast Democratic United Army. In August 1946 he had his right kidney removed in the Soviet Union.

After returning in June 1947, Luo organized second-line forces to supply reserves to the Communist field armies, and with Lin Biao he directed the autumn and winter offensives of 1947–1948. He was also involved in directing the siege of Changchun. In June 1948, he drew up measures for the blockade of the city, and on 9 September he drafted a report to Mao that described starving civilians pleading with Communist sentries to let them through the lines and soldiers weeping with them after being ordered to turn them back. The blockade caused mass starvation among the city's civilians. A 1989 book by PLA officer Zhang Zhenglong estimated that about 150,000 died in the siege.

In August 1948, Luo became political commissar of the Northeast Field Army. With Lin Biao he directed the Liaoshen campaign, which began in September. According to the historian Liu Tong, Lin hesitated early in the campaign when Nationalist reinforcements arrived, and considered turning back to attack Changchun instead. Luo's official biography credits him with persuading Lin to continue the attack on Jinzhou. The army then moved south of the Great Wall for the Pingjin campaign. In January 1949, Luo, Lin and Nie Rongzhen formed its General Front Committee, which negotiated the peaceful surrender of Fu Zuoyi's forces in Beijing. In 1949, he was appointed second secretary of the CCP's Central China Bureau and first political commissar of the Fourth Field Army, but illness kept him in Tianjin and Beijing rather than with the army.

== People's Republic of China ==
When the People's Republic was founded in October 1949, Luo became a member of the Central People's Government Council and Procurator-General of the Supreme People's Procuratorate, and he oversaw the creation of the national procuratorial system. In April 1950, he became director of the PLA's General Political Department, and later also head of its General Cadre Department. In that post he oversaw the PLA's system of military ranks, and in 1954 he directed the drafting of the PLA's political work regulations. Because of Luo's poor health, Mao wrote to him in September 1950 advising him to hold fewer meetings. Information declassified by the CIA revealed that Luo headed an espionage training center in Beijing with "300 trainees... and 20 Soviet instructors" in late June 1951.

In September 1954, Luo became a vice-chairman of the NPC Standing Committee and of the National Defence Council. He was made a marshal in September 1955, and in 1956 he also became president of the PLA Political Academy. Later that year he stepped down from the General Political Department and the General Cadre Department because of ill health, and he was elected to the Politburo at the 8th Party Congress.

From 1959, Luo was a member of the Central Military Commission in charge of the militia. In January 1961, after Tan Zheng was demoted, he returned as director of the General Political Department. He objected several times to Lin Biao's simplified approach to the study of Mao's writings. At a Military Commission meeting in April 1961, he criticized Lin's slogan of studying Mao's works "with problems in mind" in Lin's presence. Later that year he told an army political work conference that political reliability had to be matched by professional skill.

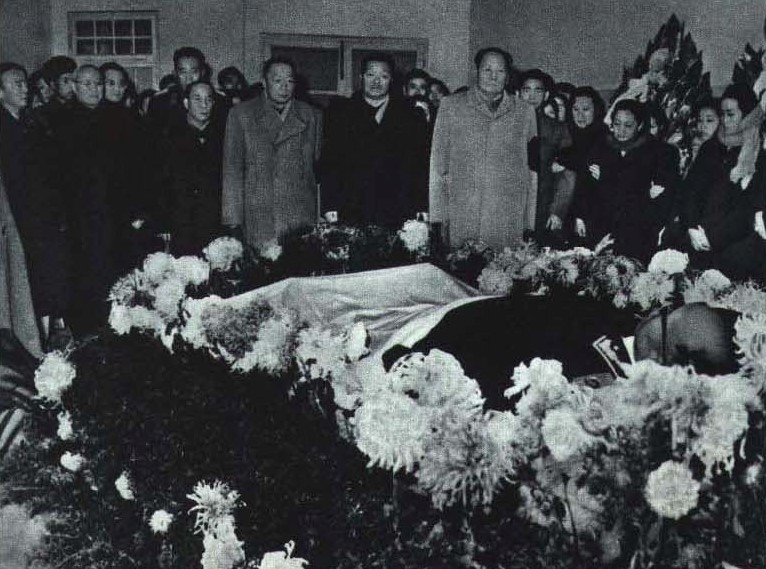
Mao Zedong at Luo's memorial service, December 1963

In September 1963, Luo was admitted to Beijing Hospital with uremia caused by kidney failure. He died in Beijing on 16 December 1963. His funeral was attended by Mao and Lin Biao; the only other funeral attended by Lin Biao was for PLA Air Force General Liu Yalou.

== Legacy ==
Luo is regarded in China as the founder of the PLA's system of political work. More than 20,000 people attended his public memorial service at the Great Hall of the People on 22 December 1963. Liu Shaoqi presided, and Deng Xiaoping gave the eulogy, which praised Luo as being "most skilled at mobilizing, organizing and relying on the masses, and most skilled at uniting cadres". Mao wrote a poem in his memory, "Lament for Comrade Luo Ronghuan" (吊罗荣桓同志).

When military ranks were conferred in 1955, Luo asked not to be made a marshal, saying that he had few military achievements. Mao insisted on including him because of his contribution to the army's political work. In 1989 the Central Military Commission named him one of the PLA's military strategists. At the commemoration of his centenary in 2002, General Secretary Jiang Zemin described him as "one of the founders of the Chinese People's Liberation Army".

Luo's former residence in Hengdong County has been a provincial protected heritage site since 1983 and opened to the public in 1985. Its memorial hall was rated a national AAAA tourist attraction in 2011.

== Personal life ==
In 1919, Luo married Yan Yue'e, who was two years older than him. Their daughter, Luo Yuying, was born in 1926. The couple lost contact after Luo left home to study in 1927. After 1949, he sent Yan money for living expenses, and she lived alone until her death in 1984.

In May 1937, Luo married Lin Yueqin. She was given the rank of senior colonel in 1955 and later served as an adviser in the cadre department of the PLA General Political Department. Three of their children died young. Their son Luo Dongjin became a lieutenant general and deputy political commissar of the Second Artillery Corps, and their daughter Luo Beijie became a professor at the PLA No. 304 Hospital.

== In popular culture ==
Luo has been portrayed on screen by Lu Jixian in the Decisive Engagement films (1991), by Sun Jitang in The Founding of a Republic and the television series Liberation (both 2009), and by He Zhengjun in the television series Decisive Battle (2021).

== Works ==
- Selected Military Writings of Luo Ronghuan (罗荣桓军事文选). PLA Publishing House, 1997.
- Luo Ronghuan: Oral Account and Autobiography (罗荣桓口述、自传). Contemporary China Publishing House, 2007.

== See also ==
- List of generals of the People's Republic of China

== Notes ==
Political offices
Preceded by none	Procurator-General of the Supreme People's Procuratorate; 1949–1954	Succeeded by Zhang Dingcheng
