= Zhu Rui =

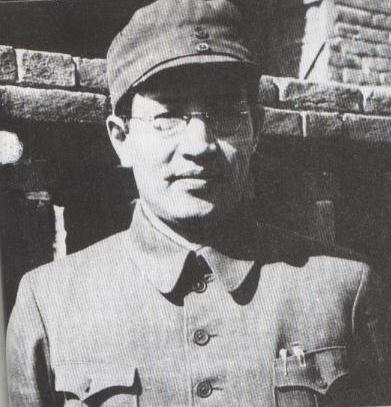
Zhu Rui

Zhu Rui (朱瑞, 1905 – 1 October 1948) was born in Suqian, Jiangsu province. He was an artillery commander of the Chinese People's Liberation Army (PLA) from October 1946 to October 1948.

== Early life ==
When he studied at Xuzhou Peixin Middle School, he was expelled from academic status. After that, he went to study in Nanjing. In the summer of 1924, he joined the Socialist Youth League. In the same year, he was admitted into Guangdong University. In 1925, he passed an entrance examination of Zhongshan University in Moscow. After his graduation from Zhongshan University in 1927, he furthered his studies in artillery barracks in the Soviet Union. In 1928, he joined the Communist Party of Soviet Union, and then switched to Chinese Communist Party.

In 1929, Zhu came back to China. He was once Chinese special correspondent, the chief of Red Army's general headquarters, a teacher of Red Army's schools, a member of the Standing Committee of the CPC Central Committee Political Bureau so on. At the end of the year 1932, he was appointed as Red Army Committee. In August, 1934, he was appointed as head of the Political Department of the first Red Army Group.

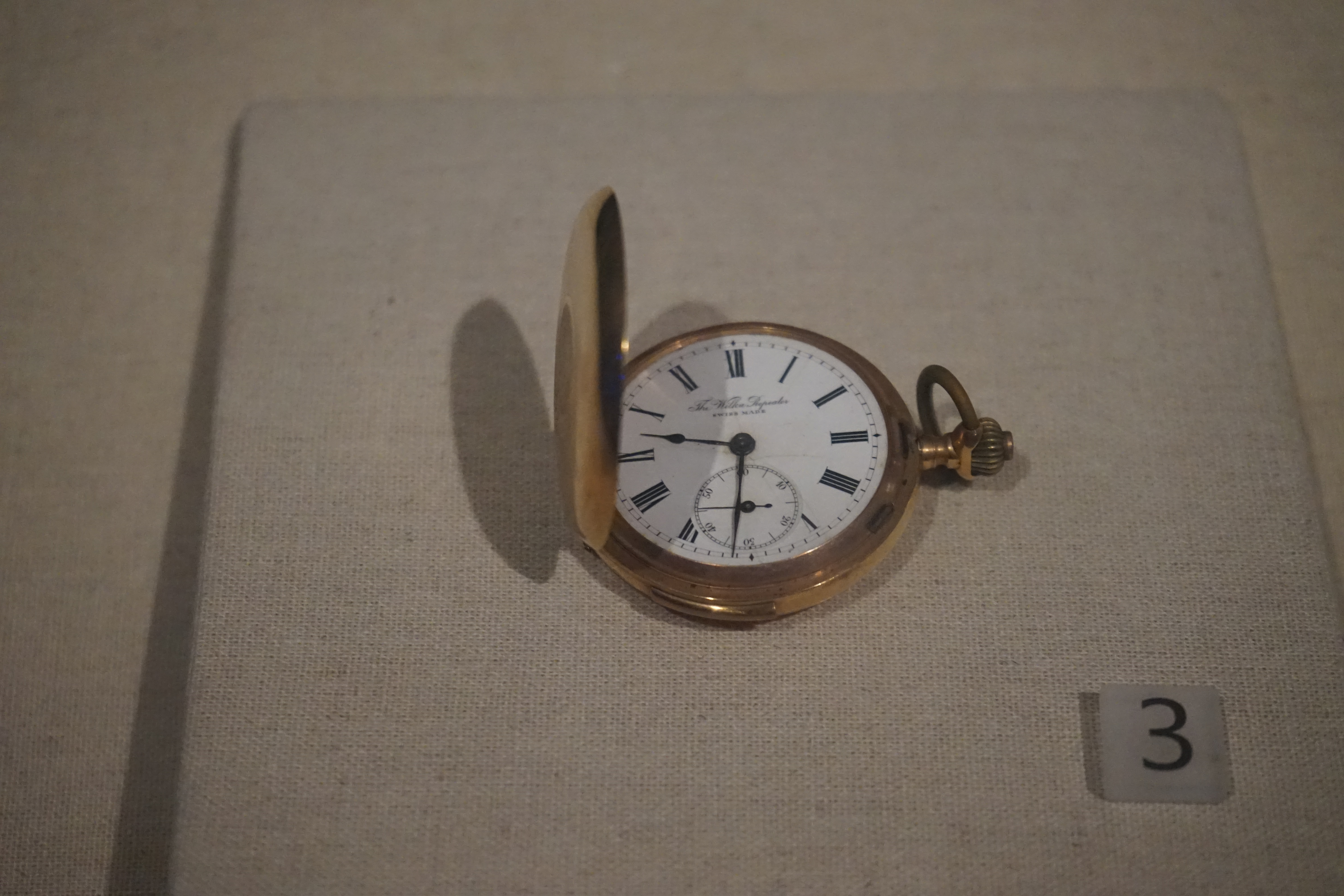
A pocket watch Zhu Rui used.

From 1937 he started serving as secretary for the Military Commission of the North China Bureau, and other positions out of the army mainly involving United Front work. He returned to the military in 1939 when he was transferred to Shandong to become political commissar of the Eighth Route Army First Column. His wife, Chen Ruoke, and their newborn son were killed in 1941 by the Japanese army.

In Shandong there were two communist military forces: the Eighth Route Army's 115th Division, led by Luo Ronghuan, and the Eighth Route Army's Shandong Column, led by the Shandong Party leader, Li Yu, and Zhang Jingwu. Although Zhu had nominal jurisdiction over both, the truth is that there was no integrated command and there were two military leadership centers in Shandong. This soon created conflicts between the leading organs and Luo requested Liu Shaoqi assistance to clarify the matter. Liu arrived in 1942 and criticized Zhu leadership, which caused him to be dismissed and went back to Yan'an in August 1943 for Rectification study, giving Luo effective command of military forces in Shandong.

After the Anti-Japanese War (1937-1945), Zhu led teachers and students of Yan'an artillery school to the Northeast, collecting weapons abandoned by Japanese soldiers and developing artillery (troops) actively. In 1946, he took on the position of Artillery Commander and the president of artillery school.

== Death ==
On October 1, 1948, during the fighting against the Kuomintang (KMT), Zhu went to check the damage of defensive wall, where he died on the way because of landmines. At that time, he was only 43 years old. The Central Military Commission decided to name the artillery school in Northeast as "Zhu Rui Artillery School" in memory of him.

== Contributions ==
- When he was the president of artillery school, he put special emphasis on training artillery leaders, summarizing the experience in fightings, which laid a solid foundation for the instruction of PLA Artillery Forces.
