= Meixian =

Meixian may refer to places in China:

- Meixian, Meizhou, a district in Meizhou, Guangdong
  - Meixian dialect, the local dialect of Hakka spoken there
- Mei County, also known as Meixian, a county in Shaanxi
- Meixian, Fujian (梅仙镇), town in and subdivision of Youxi County, Fujian
- Meixian, Hunan (梅仙镇), town in and subdivision of Pingjiang County, Hunan
