= White Snow, Red Blood =

1989 Chinese book by Zhāng Zhènglóng

White Snow, Red Blood (雪白血紅) is a book by Zhāng Zhènglóng (張正隆), a colonel in the People's Liberation Army, that was published in August, 1989 by the People's Liberation Army Publishing House. It concerns the history of the People's Liberation Army during the Chinese Communist Revolution. The book was severely criticized and suppressed in the spring of 1990, after about 100,000 copies had been sold.

Based on records of the People's Liberation Army and interviews with surviving participants in the Chinese Communist Revolution the book contains information about events that are not usually included in official accounts of the Chinese Civil War such as the Siege of Changchun in 1948. Corruption in certain units of the PLA is also discussed. Among the controversial contents of the book were that the Red Army had committed atrocities during the Siege of Changchun, that senior Party leader Wang Zhen had smuggled opium during the Chinese Civil War, and that the "official" Chinese account of the Lin Biao incident was inaccurate.

Because of its controversial content, the book and its author were attacked by conservative politicians inside China, notably Yang Shangkun and Wang Zhen. Yang, who was then President of China, claimed that the book "insulted the Communist Party". Zhang was arrested in 1990 for publishing the book, and the book was censored in mainland China.

Information about the contents of the book in the West is derived from a copy obtained by the Associated Press in Hong Kong in 1990. The book was reprinted in Hong Kong in 1991 as Xuě bái xiě hóng: Guó Gòng Dōngběi dà juézhàn lìshǐ zhēnxiàng (雪白血紅: 國共東北大決戰歷史眞相 White snow red blood: A true history of the KMT-CPC battle for the Northeast) by Tiandi Press.
