= Fan Hanjie =

Chinese general (1894–1976)

Fan Hanjie 范漢傑
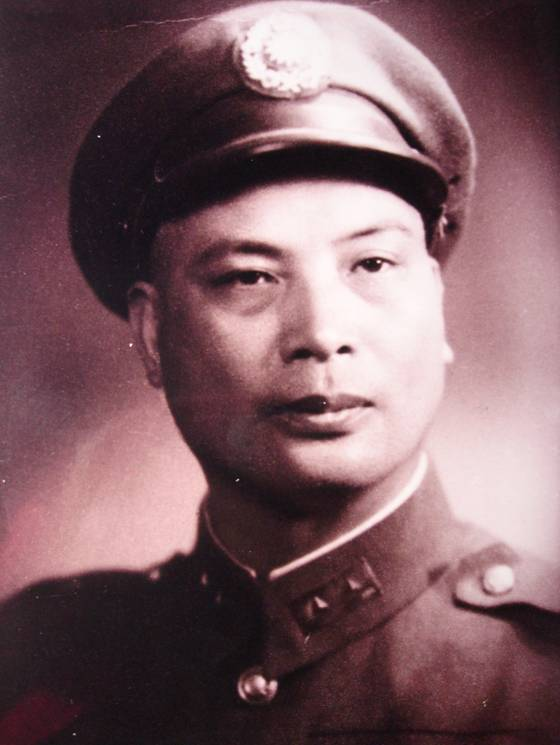
- General Fan Hanjie
- Born: 29 October 1894; Dabu County, Guangdong, China
- Died: 16 January 1976 (aged 81); Beijing, People's Republic of China
- Military career
- Allegiance: Republic of China
- Branch: (Republic of China (1912–1949)) National Revolutionary Army
- Service years: 1913–1948
- Rank: Lieutenant General
- Unit: 6th army
- Commands: Jinzhou forward command center
- Conflicts: Northern Expedition; Second Sino-Japanese War; Chinese Civil War; Liaoshen Campaign; Battle of Jinzhou
- Awards: Medal of Freedom (1945).
- Other work: writer

Fan Hanjie (simplified Chinese: 范汉杰; traditional Chinese: 范漢傑; pinyin: Fàn Hànjié; Wade–Giles: Fan Han-chieh; October 29, 1894 – January 16, 1976), courtesy name Jie-ying, was a Chinese military general who served during the Second Sino-Japanese War and Chinese Civil War. During the Liaoshen Campaign he served as the deputy commander-in-chief of Manchuria and director of the command center in Jinzhou with the rank of lieutenant general in the National Revolutionary Army.

== Early life and career ==
Fan Hanjie was born in Dabu, Guangdong. He spent his formative years at Zili College, a college his father was a founding member. In 1911, he was admitted to Guangdong Army Institute, majoring in astronomy; in 1913 after graduating he joined the military service in the Guangdong Section, as an officer of the survey bureau, in Dongjiang and the Chaoshan area. In 1920 he was transferred to the Department of Guangdong and Guangxi provinces, fighting local pirates and repress smuggling activities, and then he was promoted to the rank of captain on the Jiangping Warship. In 1923 he was again transferred to the Department of the General Staff, and promoted to the rank of colonel. In May 1924, the Whampoa Military Academy was founded in Canton, When Fan Hanjie was almost 30 years of age, and he was hesitated to enroll first, due to his mature age, most student cadets were in their early twenties. Because the successful outcome of the first KMT-CPC cooperation, Fan Hanjie had high hopes for the national revolution and he took the entrance exams and was easily admitted, is the only student who held the rank of colonel in the entire academy. After graduation from the academy, Fan Hanjie like other graduates, starting from scratch, in the army platoon, company, battalion duties to participate in the suppression of Chen Jiongming's revolt against the Nationalist Government during the Second Eastern Campaign. In the summer 1926, the National Revolutionary Army launched the Northern Expedition, and was Fan's first actual combat experience; he has been selected as commander of the 10th Regiment of the 29th Division, and was one of the first regiment commanders from the Whampoa academy. Fan led the troops to participate in the famous battle at the Ting Kau Bridge. In October the same year he was promoted to first deputy commander of 10th division. November 1927, during the KMT-CCP split, Chen Mingshu, commander of the 1st Army, and 10th Division Commander Jiang Guangnai defected to Chiang Kai-shek; Fan Hanjie also would be leaving to go to Nanjing. By Chiang Kai-sheik's orders, he was sent to the Zhejiang province as the garrison commander, as a Whampoa graduate of first class, and in August, Chiang Kai-shek stepped down, Zhejiang Guard division was abolished and Fan Hanjie was transferred to the NRA General Headquarters of the 8th Route Army. Soon Chiang Kai-shek returned to power, and sent Fan Hanjie to Japan to study the political and military strategies then he went to Germany, and studied in German military training school until the outbreak of the Manchurian incident on September 18, 1931.

== Chinese Civil War ==
In March 1945, he was formally promoted to rank of lieutenant general. On May 6 he was elected as a member of the KMT central committee, and became a confidant of Chiang Kai-shek and one of his favorite generals. In July 1948, he followed Chiang's orders to reorganize two new armies, the 5th army and the 8th army to bolster the Nationalist position in Manchuria. In September, Fan was appointed as the deputy commander-in-chief of Manchuria and director of the Jinzhou forward command. Because Wei Lihuang refused to concentrate the majority of the nationalist forces in Jinzhou and unable to disobey the orders of his superior officer, Fan fought as hard as he could, but he was outmaneuvered by the communist forces led by Lin Biao, who used massed artillery to achieve a breakthrough into the city defense, and on October 15, 1948, Jinzhou had fallen and Fan was captured by the communist Manchurian Field Army. He was imprisoned in Jinzhou Jail until his pardon by Chinese Communists years later.

== Later life ==
After his release in 1962, he was elected as a member of the CCP national committee on historical records. He had written a "Jinzhou campaign memoir," documented his war effort. In 1964 he was elected as the fourth member of the Standing Committee of the Political Consultative Conference. On January 16, 1976 he died in Beijing, at age 82.
