= Members of the 9th Central Committee of the Chinese Communist Party =

The 9th Central Committee of the Chinese Communist Party was elected by the 9th National Congress in 1969. 170 individuals served as members during this electoral term.

== Members ==
Members of the 9th Central Committee of the Chinese Communist Party
Name		8th CC	10th CC	Birth	PM	Death	Birthplace	Ethnicity	Gender	Ref.
Mao Zedong (Note: As the chairman of the Central Committee, Mao Zedong was listed first. With the exception of Vice Chairman Lin Biao, the remaining members were listed alphabetically.)	毛泽东	Member	Member	1893	1921	1976	Hunan	Han	Male	
Lin Biao (Note: As the vice chairman of the Central Committee, Lin Biao was listed second. With the exception of Chairman Mao Zedong, the remaining members were listed alphabetically. Together with certain segments of the People's Liberation Army and members of his own family, Lin Biao was accused of participating in a coup against Mao, known as Project 571. The coup was discovered and Lin died while escaping, an event known as the Lin Biao incident.)	林彪	Member	Nonmember	1907	1925	1971	Hubei	Han	Male	
Baori Ledai	宝日勒岱	Nonmember	Member	1938	1958	2020	Inner Mongolia	Mongolian	Female	
Cai Chang	蔡畅	Member	Member	1900	1923	1990	Hunan	Han	Female	
Cai Shumei	蔡树梅	Nonmember	Member	1936	1956	Alive	Hebei	Han	Female	
Cai Xiebin	蔡协斌	Nonmember	Member	1928	1958	1993	Jiangsu	Han	Male	
Cao Lihuai	曹里怀	Nonmember	Member	1909	1928	1998	Hunan	Han	Male	
Cao Yiou	曹轶欧	Nonmember	Member	1903	1926	1989	Beijing	Han	Female	
Chen Boda (Note: Chen Boda was accused of forming an alternative Party line to Mao Zedong's at the 2nd Plenary Session, held from 23 August to 6 September 1970. He was later expelled from the party in 1971.)	陈伯达	Member	Expelled	1904	1927	1989	Fujian	Han	Male	
Chen Kang	陈康	Nonmember	Nonmember	1911	1931	2002	Hubei	Han	Male	
Chen Qihan	陈奇涵	Alternate	Member	1897	1925	1981	Jiangxi	Han	Male	
Chen Shiyu	陈士榘	Nonmember	Member	1909	1927	1995	Hubei	Han	Male	
Chen Xianrui	陈先瑞	Nonmember	Member	1913	1931	1996	Anhui	Han	Male	
Chen Xilian	陈锡联	Member	Member	1915	1930	1999	Hubei	Han	Male	
Chen Yi	陈毅	Member	Nonmember	1901	1923	1972	Sichuan	Han	Male	
Chen Yonggui	陈永贵	Nonmember	Member	1914	1948	1986	Shanxi	Han	Male	
Chen Yu	陈郁	Member	Member	1901	1925	1974	Guangdong	Han	Male	
Chen Yun	陈云	Member	Member	1905	1925	1995	Shanghai	Han	Male	
Cheng Shiqing	程世清	Nonmember	Nonmember	1918	1935	2008	Henan	Han	Male	
Deng Yingchao	邓颖超	Member	Member	1904	1924	1992	Guangxi	Han	Female	
Deng Zihui	邓子恢	Member	Nonmember	1896	1925	1972	Fujian	Han	Male	
Ding Sheng	丁盛	Nonmember	Member	1913	1932	1999	Jiangxi	Han	Male	
Dong Biwu	董必武	Member	Member	1886	1921	1975	Hubei	Han	Male	
Dong Minghui	董明会	Nonmember	Member	1934	1958	1999	Hunan	Han	Male	
Du Ping	杜平	Nonmember	Member	1908	1930	1999	Jiangxi	Han	Male	
Fan Wenlan	范文澜	Nonmember	Died	1893	1926	1969	Zhejiang	Han	Male	
Gao Weisong	高维嵩	Nonmember	Nonmember	1916	1933	1985	Shaanxi	Han	Male	
Geng Biao	耿飚	Nonmember	Member	1909	1928	2000	Hunan	Han	Male	
Guo Moruo	郭沫若	Nonmember	Member	1892	1927	1978	Sichuan	Han	Male	
Han Xianchu	韩先楚	Member	Member	1913	1930	1986	Hubei	Han	Male	
Hu Jizong	胡继宗	Nonmember	Member	1920	1938	1974	Hebei	Han	Male	
Hua Guofeng	华国锋	Nonmember	Member	1921	1938	2008	Shanxi	Han	Male	
Huang Yongsheng (Note: Huang Yongsheng was criticised at the 2nd Plenary Session, held from 23 August to 6 September 1970. He was later expelled from the party in 1971.)	黄永胜	Member	Expelled	1910	1927	1983	Hubei	Han	Male	
Huang Zhen	黄镇	Nonmember	Member	1909	1932	1989	Anhui	Han	Male	
Ji Dengkui	纪登奎	Nonmember	Member	1923	1938	1988	Shanxi	Han	Male	
Jiang Liyin	江礼银	Nonmember	Member	1933	1960	1993	Fujian	Han	Male	
Jiang Qing	江青	Nonmember	Member	1915	1933	1991	Shandong	Han	Female	
Jiang Xieyuan	江燮元	Nonmember	Member	1915	1933	1990	Jiangxi	Han	Male	
Jiang Yonghui	江拥辉	Nonmember	Member	1917	1935	1991	Jiangxi	Han	Male	
Kang Sheng	康生	Member	Member	1898	1925	1975	Shandong	Han	Male	
Kong Shiquan	孔石泉	Nonmember	Member	1909	1930	2002	Hunan	Han	Male	
Kuang Rennong	邝任农	Nonmember	Nonmember	1912	1928	2003	Jiangxi	Han	Male	
Lai Jifa	赖际发	Nonmember	Nonmember	1910	1928	1982	Fujian	Han	Male	
Li Dazhang	李大章	Member	Member	1900	1924	1976	Sichuan	Han	Male	
Li Desheng	李德生	Nonmember	Member	1916	1932	2011	Henan	Han	Male	
Li Fuchun	李富春	Member	Member	1900	1923	1975	Hunan	Han	Male	
Li Qiang	李强	Nonmember	Member	1905	1925	1996	Jiangsu	Han	Male	
Li Ruishan	李瑞山	Nonmember	Member	1920	1936	1997	Shaanxi	Han	Male	
Li Shuiqing	李水清	Nonmember	Member	1918	1932	2007	Jiangxi	Han	Male	
Li Shunda	李顺达	Nonmember	Member	1915	1938	1983	Shanxi	Han	Male	
Li Siguang	李四光	Nonmember	Died	1889	1958	1971	Hubei	Han	Male	
Li Suwen	李素文	Nonmember	Member	1933	1954	2022	Hebei	Han	Female	
Li Tianyou	李天佑	Nonmember	Died	1914	1929	1970	Guangxi	Han	Male	
Li Xiannian	李先念	Member	Member	1909	1927	1992	Hubei	Han	Male	
Li Xuefeng (Note: Li Xuefeng was criticised at the 2nd Plenary Session, held from 23 August to 6 September 1970. He was later expelled from the party in 1971.)	李雪峰	Nonmember	Expelled	1907	1933	2003	Shanxi	Han	Male	
Li Zhen	李震	Nonmember	Member	1914	1937	1973	Hebei	Han	Male	
Li Zuopeng (Note: Li Zuopeng was criticised at the 2nd Plenary Session, held from 23 August to 6 September 1970. He was later expelled from the party in 1971.)	李作鹏	Nonmember	Expelled	1914	1933	2009	Jiangxi	Han	Male	
Liang Xingchu	梁兴初	Nonmember	Nonmember	1912	1930	1985	Jiangxi	Han	Male	
Liu Bocheng	刘伯承	Member	Member	1892	1926	1986	Sichuan	Han	Male	
Liu Feng	刘丰	Nonmember	Nonmember	1915	1934	1993	Henan	Han	Male	
Liu Geping	刘格平	Member	Nonmember	1904	1926	1992	Hebei	Hui	Male	
Liu Jianxun	刘建勋	Member	Member	1913	1931	1983	Hebei	Han	Male	
Liu Jieting	刘结挺	Nonmember	Nonmember	1920	1933	1993	Shandong	Han	Male	
Liu Junyi	刘均益	Nonmember	Member	1943	1964	1999	Guangdong	Han	Male	
Liu Shengtian	刘盛田	Nonmember	Member	1927	1949	Alive	Liaoning	Han	Male	
Liu Wei	刘伟	Nonmember	Member	1916	1934	1998	Jiangxi	Han	Male	
Liu Xianquan	刘贤权	Nonmember	Member	1915	1929	1992	Jiangxi	Han	Male	
Liu Xichang	刘锡昌	Nonmember	Member	1934	1958	Alive	Jiangsu	Han	Male	
Liu Xingyuan	刘兴元	Nonmember	Member	1908	1931	1990	Shandong	Han	Male	
Liu Zihou	刘子厚	Member	Member	1911	1929	2001	Hebei	Han	Male	
Long Shujin	龙书金	Nonmember	Nonmember	1910	1932	2003	Hunan	Han	Male	
Lu Ruilin	鲁瑞林	Nonmember	Member	1912	1932	1999	Gansu	Han	Male	
Lu Tianji	鹿田计	Nonmember	Member	1929	1955	Alive	Jiangsu	Han	Male	
Lü Yulan	吕玉兰	Nonmember	Member	1941	1958	1993	Hebei	Han	Female	
Ma Fuquan	马福全	Nonmember	Nonmember	1930	1956	1991	Jiangsu	Han	Male	
Mo Xianyao	莫显耀	Nonmember	Member	1919	1953	1989	Zhejiang	Han	Male	
Nan Ping	南萍	Nonmember	Nonmember	1918	1937	1989	Shandong	Han	Male	
Ni Zhifu	倪志福	Nonmember	Member	1933	1958	2013	Shanghai	Han	Male	
Nian Jirong	年继荣	Nonmember	Member	1938	1958	Alive	Gansu	Han	Male	
Nie Rongzhen	聂荣臻	Member	Member	1899	1923	1992	Sichuan	Han	Male	
Pan Fusheng	潘复生	Member	Nonmember	1908	1931	1980	Shandong	Han	Male	
Pan Shisu	潘世告	Nonmember	Nonmember	1930	1955	2007	Jiangxi	Han	Male	
Peng Shaohui	彭绍辉	Nonmember	Member	1906	1928	1978	Hunan	Han	Male	
Pi Dingjun	皮定均	Nonmember	Member	1914	1931	1976	Anhui	Han	Male	
Qian Zhiguang	钱之光	Nonmember	Member	1900	1927	1994	Zhejiang	Han	Male	
Qiu Chuangcheng	邱创成	Nonmember	Nonmember	1912	1927	1982	Hunan	Han	Male	
Qiu Guoguang	邱国光	Nonmember	Nonmember	1918	1932	2001	Fujian	Han	Male	
Qiu Huizuo (Note: Qiu Huizuo was criticised at the 2nd Plenary Session, held from 23 August to 6 September 1970. He was later expelled from the party in 1971.)	邱会作	Nonmember	Expelled	1914	1932	2002	Jiangxi	Han	Male	
Rao Xingli	饶兴礼	Nonmember	Member	1925	1951	2000	Hubei	Han	Male	
Ren Sizhong	任思忠	Nonmember	Member	1918	1936	2004	Sichuan	Han	Male	
Seypidin	赛福鼎	Alternate	Member	1915	1949	2003	Xinjiang	Uyghur	Male	
Shen Maogong	申茂功	Nonmember	Nonmember	1940	1958	Alive	Henan	Han	Male	
Su Jing	苏静	Nonmember	Member	1910	1936	1997	Fujian	Han	Male	
Su Yu	粟裕	Member	Member	1907	1927	1984	Hunan	Dong	Male	
Tan Furen (Note: Tan Furen was murdered on 17 December 1970 by disgruntled officers under investigation under the Cultural Revolution.)	谭甫仁	Nonmember	Killed	1910	1928	1970	Guangdong	Han	Male	
Tang Qishan	唐岐山	Nonmember	Member	1931	1956	1988	Henan	Han	Male	
Tang Zhongfu	唐忠富	Nonmember	Member	1934	1953	1997	Henan	Han	Male	
Teng Daiyuan	滕代远	Member	Member	1904	1925	1974	Hunan	Han	Male	
Teng Haiqing	滕海清	Nonmember	Nonmember	1909	1931	1997	Anhui	Han	Male	
Tian Bao	天宝	Alternate	Member	1917	1935	2008	Sichuan	Tibetan	Male	
Tian Huagui	田华贵	Nonmember	Member	1933	1965	Alive	Guangdong	Han	Male	
Wang Baiduan	王白旦	Nonmember	Nonmember	1934	1958	2005	Hebei	Han	Male	
Wang Bingzhang	王秉璋	Nonmember	Nonmember	1914	1935	2005	Henan	Han	Male	
Wang Chaozhu	王超柱	Nonmember	Member	1917	1959	1993	Shandong	Han	Male	
Wang Dongxing	汪东兴	Nonmember	Member	1916	1932	2015	Jiangxi	Han	Male	
Wang Guofan	王国藩	Nonmember	Member	1919	1958	2005	Hebei	Han	Male	
Wang Hongkun	王宏坤	Nonmember	Member	1909	1929	1993	Hubei	Han	Male	
Wang Hongwen	王洪文	Nonmember	Member	1935	1956	1992	Jilin	Han	Male	
Wang Huaixiang	王淮湘	Nonmember	Member	1920	1937	2013	Shandong	Han	Male	
Wang Huiqiu	王辉球	Nonmember	Nonmember	1911	1930	2003	Jiangxi	Han	Male	
Wang Jinxi	王进喜	Nonmember	Died	1923	1956	1970	Gansu	Han	Male	
Wang Shoudao	王首道	Member	Member	1906	1926	1996	Hunan	Han	Male	
Wang Shusheng	王树声	Member	Member	1905	1926	1974	Hubei	Han	Male	
Wang Xiaoyu	王效禹	Nonmember	Nonmember	1914	1938	1995	Shandong	Han	Male	
Wang Xinting	王新亭	Nonmember	Nonmember	1908	1930	1984	Hubei	Han	Male	
Wang Xiuzhen	王秀珍	Nonmember	Member	1935	1953	Alive	Liaoning	Han	Female	
Wang Zhen	王震	Member	Member	1908	1927	1993	Hunan	Han	Male	
Wei Bingkui	魏秉奎	Nonmember	Member	1928	1953	1999	Liaoning	Han	Male	
Wei Fengying	尉凤英	Nonmember	Member	1933	1954	Alive	Liaoning	Han	Female	
Wei Guoqing	韦国清	Member	Member	1913	1931	1989	Guangxi	Zhuang	Male	
Wen Yucheng	温玉成	Nonmember	Nonmember	1915	1932	1989	Jiangxi	Han	Male	
Wu Dasheng	吴大胜	Nonmember	Member	1914	1935	1994	Hubei	Han	Male	
Wu De	吴德	Member	Member	1913	1933	1995	Hebei	Han	Male	
Wu Faxian (Note: Wu Faxian was criticised at the 2nd Plenary Session, held from 23 August to 6 September 1970. He was later expelled from the party in 1971.)	吴法宪	Nonmember	Expelled	1915	1932	2004	Jiangxi	Han	Male	
Wu Guixian	吴桂贤	Nonmember	Member	1938	1958	2025	Henan	Han	Female	
Wu Ruilin	吴瑞林	Nonmember	Nonmember	1915	1932	1995	Sichuan	Han	Male	
Wu Tao	吴涛	Nonmember	Member	1912	1935	1983	Liaoning	Mongolian	Male	
Xia Bangyin	夏邦银	Nonmember	Member	1935	1960	2001	Hubei	Han	Male	
Xian Henghan	冼恒汉	Nonmember	Member	1911	1931	1991	Guangxi	Zhuang	Male	
Xiao Jinguang	肖劲光	Member	Member	1903	1922	1989	Hunan	Han	Male	
Xie Fuzhi	谢富治	Member	Died	1909	1931	1972	Hubei	Han	Male	
Xie Jiaxiang	谢家祥	Nonmember	Member	1914	1934	2010	Jiangxi	Han	Male	
Xie Xuegong	解学恭	Nonmember	Member	1916	1936	1993	Shanxi	Han	Male	
Xu Haidong	徐海东	Member	Died	1900	1925	1970	Hubei	Han	Male	
Xu Jingxian	徐景贤	Nonmember	Member	1933	1963	2007	Shanghai	Han	Male	
Xu Shiyou	许世友	Member	Member	1905	1927	1985	Henan	Han	Male	
Xu Xiangqian	徐向前	Member	Member	1901	1927	1990	Shanxi	Han	Male	
Yang Chunfu	杨春甫	Nonmember	Member	1913	1932	2011	Hebei	Han	Male	
Yang Dezhi	杨得志	Member	Member	1911	1928	1994	Hunan	Han	Male	
Yang Fuzhen	杨富珍	Nonmember	Nonmember	1932	1949	Alive	Shanghai	Han	Female	
Yao Wenyuan	姚文元	Nonmember	Member	1931	1948	2005	Zhejiang	Han	Male	
Ye Jianying	叶剑英	Member	Member	1897	1927	1986	Guangdong	Han	Male	
Ye Qun	叶群	Nonmember	Expelled	1917	1936	1971	Fujian	Han	Female	
Yu Qiuli	余秋里	Nonmember	Member	1914	1931	1999	Jiangxi	Han	Male	
Yu Sang	于桑	Nonmember	Member	1917	1936	2008	Sichuan	Han	Male	
Yuan Shengping	袁升平	Nonmember	Nonmember	1912	1930	2003	Jiangxi	Han	Male	
Zeng Guohua	曾国华	Nonmember	Nonmember	1910	1932	1978	Guangdong	Han	Male	
Zeng Shan	曾山	Member	Died	1899	1926	1972	Jiangxi	Han	Male	
Zeng Shaoshan	曾绍山	Nonmember	Member	1914	1933	1995	Anhui	Han	Male	
Zeng Siyu	曾思玉	Nonmember	Member	1911	1932	2012	Jiangxi	Han	Male	
Zhang Caiqian	张才千	Nonmember	Member	1911	1931	1994	Hubei	Han	Male	
Zhang Chiming	张池明	Nonmember	Member	1917	1935	1997	Henan	Han	Male	
Zhang Chunqiao	张春桥	Nonmember	Member	1917	1938	2005	Shandong	Han	Male	
Zhang Dazhi	张达志	Member	Member	1911	1929	1992	Shaanxi	Han	Male	
Zhang Dingcheng	张鼎丞	Member	Member	1898	1927	1981	Fujian	Han	Male	
Zhang Fugui	张富贵	Nonmember	Member	1913	1944	1994	Shandong	Han	Male	
Zhang Fuheng	张福恒	Nonmember	Member	1931	1960	Alive	Hebei	Han	Male	
Zhang Guohua	张国华	Nonmember	Nonmember	1914	1931	1972	Jiangxi	Han	Male	
Zhang Hengyun	张恒云	Nonmember	Member	1931	1959	1988	Shandong	Han	Male	
Zhang Tianyun	张天云	Nonmember	Nonmember	1913	1931	1980	Hubei	Han	Male	
Zhang Tixue	张体学	Nonmember	Member	1915	1933	1973	Henan	Han	Male	
Zhang Yixiang	张翼翔	Nonmember	Member	1914	1932	1990	Guangdong	Han	Male	
Zhang Yunyi	张云逸	Member	Member	1892	1926	1974	Guangdong	Han	Male	
Zheng Weishan	郑维山	Nonmember	Nonmember	1915	1930	2000	Hubei	Han	Male	
Zhou Chiping	周赤萍	Nonmember	Nonmember	1914	1931	1990	Jiangxi	Han	Male	
Zhou Enlai	周恩来	Member	Member	1898	1921	1976	Jiangsu	Han	Male	
Zhou Jianren	周建人	Nonmember	Member	1888	1948	1984	Zhejiang	Han	Male	
Zhou Xing	周兴	Nonmember	Member	1905	1926	1975	Jiangxi	Han	Male	
Zhu De	朱德	Member	Member	1886	1925	1976	Sichuan	Han	Male	
Zong Xiyun	宗希云	Nonmember	Member	1928	1953	Alive	Shandong	Han	Male	
