= Members of the 10th Central Committee of the Chinese Communist Party =

The 10th Central Committee of the Chinese Communist Party was elected by the 10th National Congress in 1973. 194 individuals served as members during this electoral term.

== Members ==
Members of the 10th Central Committee of the Chinese Communist Party
Name		9th CC	11th CC	Birth	PM	Death	Birthplace	Ethnicity	Gender	Ref.
An Pingsheng	安平生	Nonmember	Member	1917	1937	1999	Shaanxi	Han	Male	
Bai Rubing	白如冰	Nonmember	Member	1912	1928	1994	Shaanxi	Han	Male	
Baori Ledai	宝日勒岱	Member	Nonmember	1938	1958	2020	Inner Mongolia	Mongolian	Female	
Basang	巴桑	Nonmember	Member	1937	1959	Alive	Tibet	Tibetan	Female	
Cai Chang	蔡畅	Member	Member	1900	1923	1990	Hunan	Han	Female	
Cai Shumei	蔡树海	Member	Nonmember	1936	1956	Alive	Hebei	Han	Female	
Cai Xiao	蔡啸	Nonmember	Member	1919	1939	1990	Taiwan	Han	Male	
Cai Xiebin	蔡协斌	Member	Nonmember	1928	1958	1993	Jiangsu	Han	Male	
Cao Lihuai	曹里怀	Member	Member	1909	1928	1998	Hunan	Han	Male	
Cao Yiou	曹轶欧	Member	Nonmember	1903	1926	1989	Beijing	Han	Female	
Cen Guorong	岑国荣	Alternate	Alternate	1934	1955	2018	Guangxi	Han	Male	
Chen Kang	陈康	Nonmember	Nonmember	1910	1931	2002	Hunan	Han	Male	
Chen Muhua	陈慕华	Nonmember	Member	1921	1938	2011	Zhejiang	Han	Female	
Chen Qihan	陈奇涵	Member	Member	1897	1925	1981	Jiangxi	Han	Male	
Chen Shiyu	陈士榘	Member	Nonmember	1909	1927	1995	Hubei	Han	Male	
Chen Xianrui	陈先瑞	Member	Alternate	1913	1931	1996	Anhui	Han	Male	
Chen Xilian	陈锡联	Member	Member	1915	1930	1999	Hubei	Han	Male	
Chen Yonggui	陈永贵	Member	Member	1914	1948	1986	Shanxi	Han	Male	
Chen Yu (Note: Chen Yu died of natural causes on 21 March 1974.)	陈郁	Member	Died	1901	1925	1974	Guangdong	Han	Male	
Chen Yun	陈云	Member	Member	1905	1925	1995	Shanghai	Han	Male	
Cui Hailong	崔海龙	Alternate	Nonmember	1928	1947	1996	Jilin	Korean	Male	
Deng Xiaoping	邓小平	Comeback	Member	1904	1924	1997	Sichuan	Han	Male	
Deng Yingchao	鄧穎超	Member	Member	1904	1924	1992	Guangxi	Han	Female	
Ding Guoyu	丁国钰	Nonmember	Member	1916	1933	2015	Anhui	Han	Male	
Ding Keze	丁可则	Nonmember	Member	1933	1954	2017	Jiangsu	Han	Male	
Ding Sheng	丁盛	Member	Nonmember	1913	1932	1999	Jiangxi	Han	Male	
Dong Biwu (Note: Dong Biwu died of natural causes on 2 April 1975.)	董必武	Member	Died	1886	1921	1975	Hubei	Han	Male	
Dong Minghui	董明会	Member	Nonmember	1934	1958	1999	Hunan	Han	Male	
Du Ping	杜平	Member	Alternate	1908	1930	1999	Jiangxi	Han	Male	
Duan Junyi	段君毅	Nonmember	Member	1910	1936	2004	Henan	Han	Male	
Fan Deling	樊德玲	Alternate	Member	1933	1960	1999	Hebei	Han	Male	
Fang Yi	方毅	Alternate	Member	1916	1931	1997	Fujian	Han	Male	
Feng Xuan	冯铉	Nonmember	Member	1915	1936	1986	Jiangsu	Han	Male	
Fu Chuanzuo	傅传作	Alternate	Nonmember	1914	1931	1982	Hubei	Han	Male	
Geng Biao	耿飚	Member	Member	1909	1928	2000	Hunan	Han	Male	
Geng Qichang	耿起昌	Alternate	Member	1915	1938	1991	Shanxi	Han	Male	
Gu Mu	谷牧	Nonmember	Member	1914	1932	2009	Shandong	Han	Male	
Guo Hongjie	郭宏杰	Alternate	Nonmember	1937	1956	2008	Anhui	Han	Male	
Guo Moruo	郭开贞	Member	Member	1892	1927	1978	Sichuan	Han	Male	
Guo Yufeng	郭玉峰	Alternate	Member	1918	1938	2000	Hebei	Han	Male	
Han Xianchu	韩先楚	Member	Member	1913	1930	1986	Hubei	Han	Male	
Han Ying	韩英	Alternate	Member	1935	1956	Alive	Liaoning	Han	Male	
Hu Jizong (Note: Hu Jizong died of natural causes on 4 July 1974.)	胡继宗	Member	Died	1920	1938	1974	Hebei	Han	Male	
Hua Guofeng	华国锋	Member	Member	1921	1938	2008	Shanxi	Han	Male	
Hua Linsen	华林森	Alternate	Nonmember	1926	1956	1987	Shanghai	Han	Male	
Huang Hua	黄华	Nonmember	Member	1913	1936	2010	Hebei	Han	Male	
Huang Zhen	黄镇	Member	Member	1909	1932	1989	Anhui	Han	Male	
Ismail Amat	司马义·艾买提	Nonmember	Member	1935	1953	2018	Xinjiang	Uyghur	Male	
Ji Dengkui	纪登奎	Member	Member	1923	1938	1988	Shanxi	Han	Male	
Ji Pengfei	姬鹏飞	Nonmember	Member	1910	1933	2000	Shanxi	Han	Male	
Jiang Liyin	江礼银	Member	Member	1933	1960	1993	Fujian	Han	Male	
Jiang Qing (Note: Jiang Qing was arrested on 6 October 1976 for being a leading member of the Gang of Four, a group that was accused of formenting much of the excesses of the Cultural Revolution.)	江青	Member	Expelled	1915	1933	1991	Shandong	Han	Female	
Jiang Xieyuan	江燮元	Member	Alternate	1915	1933	1990	Jiangxi	Han	Male	
Jiang Yonghui	江拥辉	Member	Member	1917	1935	1991	Jiangxi	Han	Male	
Jiao Linyi	焦林义	Alternate	Member	1920	1937	2005	Hebei	Han	Male	
Jin Zumin	金祖敏	Alternate	Nonmember	1934	1960	1997	Zhejiang	Han	Male	
Kang Sheng (Note: Kang Sheng died of natural causes on 16 December 1975.)	康生	Member	Died	1898	1925	1975	Shandong	Han	Male	
Kong Shiquan	孔石泉	Member	Member	1909	1930	2002	Hunan	Han	Male	
Kong Zhaonian	孔照年	Nonmember	Member	1925	1942	2019	Shandong	Han	Male	
Li Baohua	李葆华	Nonmember	Member	1909	1931	2005	Hebei	Han	Male	
Li Da	李达	Nonmember	Member	1905	1932	1993	Hunan	Han	Male	
Li Dazhang (Note: Li Dazhang died of natural causes on 3 May 1976.)	李大章	Member	Died	1900	1924	1976	Sichuan	Han	Male	
Li Desheng	李德生	Member	Member	1916	1932	2011	Henan	Han	Male	
Li Fuchun (Note: Li Fuchun died of natural causes on 9 January 1975.)	李富春	Member	Died	1900	1923	1975	Hunan	Han	Male	
Li Jingquan	李井泉	Nonmember	Member	1909	1930	1989	Jiangxi	Han	Male	
Li Qiang	李强	Member	Member	1905	1925	1996	Jiangsu	Han	Male	
Li Renzhi	李任之	Nonmember	Member	1919	1938	1983	Guangdong	Han	Male	
Li Ruishan	李瑞山	Member	Member	1920	1936	1997	Shaanxi	Han	Male	
Li Shuiqing	李水清	Member	Member	1918	1932	2007	Jiangxi	Han	Male	
Li Shunda	李顺达	Member	Nonmember	1915	1938	1983	Shanxi	Han	Male	
Li Suwen	李素文	Member	Nonmember	1933	1954	2022	Hebei	Han	Female	
Li Xiannian	李先念	Member	Member	1909	1927	1992	Hubei	Han	Male	
Li Zhen (Note: Li Zhen died of natural causes on 22 October 1973.)	李震	Member	Died	1914	1937	1973	Hebei	Han	Male	
Li Zhimin	李志民	Nonmember	Member	1906	1927	1987	Hunan	Han	Male	
Liang Jintang	梁锦棠	Alternate	Nonmember	1940	1966	Alive	Guangdong	Han	Male	
Liao Chengzhi	廖承志	Nonmember	Member	1908	1928	1983	Guangdong	Han	Male	
Lin Liyun	林丽韫	Nonmember	Member	1933	1963	Alive	Taiwan	Han	Female	
Liu Bocheng	刘伯承	Member	Member	1892	1926	1986	Sichuan	Han	Male	
Liu Jianxun	刘建勋	Member	Member	1913	1931	1983	Hebei	Han	Male	
Liu Junyi (Note: Liu Junyi was suspended from all offices pending the results of an official investigation in May 1977. The investigation reached the verdict to expel Liu in August 1985.)	刘均益	Member	Review	1943	1964	1999	Guangdong	Han	Male	
Liu Shengtian	刘盛田	Member	Nonmember	1927	1949	Alive	Liaoning	Han	Male	
Liu Wei	刘伟	Member	Member	1916	1934	1998	Jiangxi	Han	Male	
Liu Xiangping (Note: Liu Xiangping was removed from all offices in October 1976 and expelled from the party in August 1985.)	刘湘屏	Nonmember	Removed	1920	1937	2017	Shanxi	Han	Male	
Liu Xianquan	刘贤权	Member	Nonmember	1915	1929	1992	Jiangxi	Han	Male	
Liu Xichang	刘锡昌	Member	Member	1934	1958	Alive	Jiangsu	Han	Male	
Liu Xingyuan	刘兴元	Member	Member	1908	1931	1990	Shandong	Han	Male	
Liu Zihou	刘子厚	Member	Member	1911	1929	2001	Hebei	Han	Male	
Lu Ruilin	鲁瑞林	Member	Nonmember	1912	1932	1999	Gansu	Han	Male	
Lu Tianji	鹿田计	Member	Member	1929	1955	Alive	Jiangsu	Han	Male	
Luo Qingchang	罗青长	Nonmember	Member	1918	1936	2014	Sichuan	Han	Male	
Luo Xikang	罗锡康	Alternate	Nonmember	1931	1960	2002	Guizhou	Han	Male	
Lü Yulan	吕玉兰	Member	Member	1941	1958	1993	Hebei	Han	Female	
Ma Ning	马宁	Nonmember	Nonmember	1922	1938	2010	Henan	Han	Male	
Ma Tianshui (Note: Ma Tianshui was placed under investigation for his affiliation with the Gang of Four. The investigation found him guilty and Wang was expelled from the party in December 1981.)	马天水	Alternate	Review	1912	1931	1988	Hebei	Han	Male	
Mao Zedong (Note: As the chairman of the Central Committee, Mao Zedong was listed first when he was alive. He died of natural causes on 9 September 1976.)	毛泽东	Member	Died	1893	1921	1976	Hunan	Han	Male	
Mo Xianyao	莫显耀	Member	Nonmember	1919	1953	1989	Zhejiang	Han	Male	
Ni Zhifu	倪志福	Member	Member	1933	1958	2013	Shanghai	Han	Male	
Nian Jirong	年继荣	Member	Nonmember	1938	1958	Alive	Gansu	Han	Male	
Nie Rongzhen	聂荣臻	Member	Member	1899	1923	1992	Sichuan	Han	Male	
Pan Shigao	潘世告	Nonmember	Nonmember	1930	1955	2007	Jiangxi	Han	Male	
Peng Shaohui	彭绍辉	Member	Member	1906	1928	1978	Hunan	Han	Male	
Pi Dingjun (Note: Pi Dingjun died of natural causes on 7 July 1976.)	皮定均	Member	Died	1914	1931	1976	Anhui	Han	Male	
Qian Zhengying	钱正英	Member	Member	1900	1927	1994	Zhejiang	Han	Male	
Qian Zhiguang	钱之光	Member	Member	1900	1927	1994	Zhejiang	Han	Male	
Qiao Guanhua	乔冠华	Nonmember	Nonmember	1913	1939	1983	Jiangsu	Han	Male	
Qin Jiwei	秦基伟	Nonmember	Member	1914	1930	1997	Hubei	Han	Male	
Rao Xingli	饶兴礼	Member	Member	1925	1951	2000	Hubei	Han	Male	
Ren Sizhong	任思忠	Member	Member	1918	1936	2004	Sichuan	Han	Male	
Seypidin	赛福鼎	Member	Member	1915	1949	2003	Xinjiang	Uyghur	Male	
Song Peizhang	宋佩璋	Nonmember	Nonmember	1919	1935	1989	Hebei	Han	Male	
Su Jing	苏静	Member	Member	1910	1936	1997	Fujian	Han	Male	
Su Yu	粟裕	Member	Member	1907	1927	1984	Hunan	Dong	Male	
Su Zhenhua	苏振华	Nonmember	Member	1912	1930	1979	Hunan	Han	Male	
Tan Qilong	谭启龙	Alternate	Member	1913	1933	2003	Jiangxi	She	Male	
Tan Zhenlin	谭震林	Nonmember	Member	1902	1926	1983	Hunan	Han	Male	
Tang Qishan	唐岐山	Member	Nonmember	1931	1956	1988	Henan	Han	Male	
Tang Zhongfu	唐忠富	Member	Nonmember	1934	1953	1997	Henan	Han	Male	
Tao Lujia	陶鲁笳	Nonmember	Nonmember	1917	1936	2011	Jiangsu	Zhuang	Male	
Teng Daiyuan (Note: Teng Daiyuan died of natural causes on 1 December 1974.)	滕代远	Member	Died	1904	1925	1974	Hunan	Han	Male	
Tian Bao	天宝	Member	Member	1917	1935	2008	Sichuan	Tibetan	Male	
Tian Huagui	田华贵	Member	Nonmember	1933	1965	Alive	Guangdong	Han	Male	
Tian Weixin	田维新	Nonmember	Nonmember	1915	1939	2002	Shandong	Han	Male	
Ulanhu	乌兰夫	Nonmember	Member	1906	1925	1988	Suiyuan	Tümed	Male	
Wang Bicheng	王必成	Nonmember	Member	1912	1930	1989	Hubei	Han	Male	
Wang Chaozhu	王超柱	Member	Member	1917	1959	1993	Shandong	Han	Male	
Wang Dongxing	汪东兴	Member	Member	1916	1932	2015	Jiangxi	Han	Male	
Wang Guofan	王国藩	Member	Member	1919	1958	2005	Hebei	Han	Male	
Wang Hongkun	王宏坤	Member	Nonmember	1909	1929	1993	Hubei	Han	Male	
Wang Hongwen (Note: Wang Hongwen was arrested on 6 October 1976 for being a leading member of the Gang of Four, a group that was accused of formenting much of the excesses of the Cultural Revolution.)	王洪文	Member	Expelled	1935	1956	1992	Jilin	Han	Male	
Wang Huaixiang	王淮湘	Member	Nonmember	1920	1937	2013	Shandong	Han	Male	
Wang Jiaxiang (Note: Teng Daiyuan died of natural causes on 25 January 1974.)	王稼祥	Nonmember	Died	1906	1928	1974	Anhui	Han	Male	
Wang Shoudao	王首道	Member	Member	1906	1926	1996	Hunan	Han	Male	
Wang Shusheng (Note: Wang Shusheng died of natural causes on 7 January 1974.)	王树声	Member	Died	1905	1926	1974	Hubei	Han	Male	
Wang Shuzhen	王淑珍	Nonmember	Nonmember	1935	1952	Alive	Tianjin	Han	Female	
Wang Xiuzhen (Note: Wang Xiuzhen was placed under investigation for his affiliation with the Gang of Four. The investigation found him guilty and Wang was expelled from the party in January 1978.)	王秀珍	Member	Review	1935	1953	Alive	Liaoning	Han	Female	
Wang Zhen	王震	Member	Member	1908	1927	1993	Hunan	Han	Male	
Wang Zheng	王诤	Nonmember	Member	1909	1934	1978	Jiangsu	Han	Male	
Wei Bingkui	魏秉奎	Member	Nonmember	1928	1953	1999	Liaoning	Han	Male	
Wei Fengying	尉凤英	Member	Alternate	1933	1954	Alive	Liaoning	Han	Female	
Wei Guoqing	韦国清	Member	Member	1913	1931	1989	Guangxi	Zhuang	Male	
Wu Dasheng	吴大胜	Member	Nonmember	1914	1935	1994	Hubei	Han	Male	
Wu De	吴德	Member	Member	1913	1933	1995	Hebei	Han	Male	
Wu Guixian	吴桂贤	Member	Member	1938	1958	2025	Henan	Han	Female	
Wu Tao	吴涛	Member	Nonmember	1912	1935	1983	Liaoning	Mongolian	Male	
Xia Bangyin	夏邦银	Member	Nonmember	1935	1960	2001	Hubei	Han	Male	
Xian Henghan	冼恒汉	Member	Nonmember	1911	1931	1991	Guangxi	Zhuang	Male	
Xiao Jinguang	肖劲光	Member	Member	1903	1922	1989	Hunan	Han	Male	
Xie Jiaxiang	谢家祥	Member	Nonmember	1914	1934	2010	Jiangxi	Han	Male	
Xie Jingyi	谢静宜	Nonmember	Nonmember	1935	1956	2017	Henan	Han	Male	
Xie Xuegong	解学恭	Member	Member	1916	1936	1993	Shanxi	Han	Male	
Xing Yanzi	邢燕子	Nonmember	Member	1940	1960	2022	Tianjin	Han	Female	
Xu Jingxian	徐景贤	Member	Nonmember	1933	1963	2007	Shanghai	Han	Male	
Xu Shiyou	许世友	Member	Member	1905	1927	1985	Henan	Han	Male	
Xu Xiangqian	徐向前	Member	Member	1901	1927	1990	Shanxi	Han	Male	
Yang Chunfu	杨春甫	Member	Nonmember	1913	1932	2011	Hebei	Han	Male	
Yang Dezhi	杨得志	Member	Member	1911	1928	1994	Hunan	Han	Male	
Yang Yong	杨勇	Nonmember	Member	1913	1930	1983	Hunan	Han	Male	
Yao Wenyuan (Note: Yao Wenyuan was arrested on 6 October 1976 for being a leading member of the Gang of Four, a group that was accused of formenting much of the excesses of the Cultural Revolution.)	姚文元	Member	Expelled	1931	1948	2005	Zhejiang	Han	Male	
Ye Jianying	叶剑英	Member	Member	1897	1927	1986	Guangdong	Han	Male	
You Taizhong	尤太忠	Alternate	Member	1918	1934	1998	Henan	Han	Male	
Yu Hongliang	于洪亮	Nonmember	Member	1935	1959	1990	Shandong	Han	Male	
Yu Huiyong	于会泳	Nonmember	Nonmember	1926	1949	1977	Shandong	Han	Male	
Yu Qiuli	余秋里	Member	Member	1914	1931	1999	Jiangxi	Han	Male	
Yu Sang	于桑	Member	Member	1917	1936	2008	Sichuan	Han	Male	
Zeng Shaoshan	曾绍山	Member	Member	1914	1933	1995	Anhui	Han	Male	
Zeng Siyu	曾思玉	Member	Member	1911	1932	2012	Jiangxi	Han	Male	
Zhang Caiqian	张才千	Member	Member	1911	1931	1994	Hubei	Han	Male	
Zhang Chiming	张池明	Member	Nonmember	1917	1935	1997	Henan	Han	Male	
Zhang Chunqiao (Note: Zhang Chunqiao was arrested on 6 October 1976 for being a leading member of the Gang of Four, a group that was accused of formenting much of the excesses of the Cultural Revolution.)	张春桥	Member	Expelled	1917	1938	2005	Shandong	Han	Male	
Zhang Dazhi	张达志	Member	Nonmember	1911	1929	1992	Shaanxi	Han	Male	
Zhang Dingcheng	张鼎丞	Member	Member	1898	1927	1981	Fujian	Han	Male	
Zhang Fugui	张富贵	Member	Member	1913	1944	1994	Shandong	Han	Male	
Zhang Fuheng	张福恒	Member	Member	1931	1960	Alive	Hebei	Han	Male	
Zhang Hengyun	张恒云	Member	Nonmember	1931	1959	1988	Shandong	Han	Male	
Zhang Hongchi	张洪池	Nonmember	Nonmember	1936	1958	Alive	Jiangsu	Han	Male	
Zhang Pinghua	张平化	Nonmember	Member	1908	1927	2001	Hunan	Han	Male	
Zhang Shuzhi	张树芝	Nonmember	Nonmember	1915	1929	2001	Hunan	Han	Male	
Zhang Tixue (Note: Zhang Tixue died of natural causes on 3 September 1973.)	张体学	Member	Died	1915	1933	1973	Henan	Han	Male	
Zhang Weimin	张维民	Nonmember	Nonmember	1930	1947	2003	Shandong	Han	Male	
Zhang Yancheng	张延成	Alternate	Nonmember	1942	1964	Alive	Shandong	Han	Male	
Zhang Yixiang	张翼翔	Member	Nonmember	1914	1932	1990	Guangdong	Han	Male	
Zhang Yunyi (Note: Zhang Yunyi died of natural causes on 19 November 1974.)	张云逸	Member	Died	1892	1926	1974	Guangdong	Han	Male	
Zhang Zongxun	张宗逊	Nonmember	Nonmember	1908	1926	1998	Shaanxi	Han	Male	
Zhao Ziyang	赵紫阳	Nonmember	Member	1919	1938	2005	Henan	Han	Male	
Zhou Chunlin	周纯麟	Nonmember	Member	1912	1932	1986	Hubei	Han	Male	
Zhou Enlai (Note: Zhou Enlai died of natural causes on 8 January 1976.)	周恩来	Member	Died	1898	1921	1976	Jiangsu	Han	Male	
Zhou Hongbao	周宏宝	Nonmember	Nonmember	1935	1959	1994	Jiangsu	Han	Male	
Zhou Jianren	周建人	Member	Member	1888	1948	1984	Zhejiang	Han	Male	
Zhou Liqin	周丽琴	Nonmember	Nonmember	1939	1966	Alive	Shanghai	Han	Female	
Zhou Xing (Note: Zhou Xing died of natural causes on 3 October 1975.)	周兴	Member	Died	1905	1926	1975	Jiangxi	Han	Male	
Zhu De (Note: Zhu De died of natural causes on 6 July 1976.)	朱德	Member	Died	1886	1925	1976	Sichuan	Han	Male	
Zhu Jiayao	祝家耀	Nonmember	Nonmember	1937	1959	Alive	Zhejiang	Han	Male	
Zhu Muzhi	朱穆之	Nonmember	Member	1916	1938	2015	Jiangsu	Han	Male	
Zhuang Zedong	庄则栋	Nonmember	Nonmember	1940	1962	2013	Zhejiang	Han	Male	
Zong Xiyun	宗希云	Member	Member	1928	1953	Alive	Shandong	Han	Male	
