= Lichen (disambiguation) =

Lichen is a type of symbiotic organism.

Lichen may also refer to:

== Arts, entertainment, and media ==
- Lichens (musician), Robert Aiki Aubrey Lowe's solo musical project
- "Lichen", the nickname for an untitled song by Aphex Twin from the album Selected Ambient Works Volume II

== Biology ==
- Asphodelus albus, a herbaceous perennial plant sometimes called white lichen

=== Skin diseases ===
See also Category:Lichenoid eruptions, List of skin conditions#Lichenoid eruptions

- Lichen aureus, a skin disease
- Lichen nitidus, a chronic inflammatory skin disease
- Lichen planus, an inflammatory disease
- Lichen ruber moniliformis, a rare skin disease
- Lichen sclerosus, a skin disease
- Lichen simplex chronicus, a skin disease
- Lichen spinulosus, a rare skin disease
- Lichen striatus, a rare skin disease, mostly in children
- Lichen verrucosus et reticularis, a cutaneous disease
- Lichenoid trikeratosis, a cutaneous disease

== Places ==
=== Antarctica ===
- Lichen Island, Antarctica
- Lichen Hills on the Rennick Glacier, East Antarctica

=== Poland ===
- Licheń Stary, a village in central Poland
  - Sanctuary of Our Lady of Licheń, a large church at Licheń Stary
- Licheń, Lubusz Voivodeship, a village in western Poland

== See also ==
- Li Chen (disambiguation)
- Lich, an undead creature
- Lichen Lake (disambiguation)
- Lycan (disambiguation)
