= Guixian =

Guixian may refer to:

- Gui County (Chinese: 贵县), former name of Guigang, prefecture-level city in Guangxi, China
- Guixian (Taoism) (Chinese: 鬼仙), type of immortal in Taoism
- Li Guixian (Chinese: 李贵鲜), Chinese politician
- Wu Guixian (Chinese: 吴桂贤), Chinese politician
