= Li Zhen =

Li Zhen (Wade–Giles: Li Chen) may refer to:

- Li Zhen (Tang dynasty) (627–688), son of Emperor Taizong of Tang
- Li Yu, Prince of De (died 905), son of Emperor Zhaozong of Tang, briefly known as Li Zhen at one point
- Li Zhen (Later Liang) (died 923), key politician of Later Liang
- Li Zhen (Taoist) (died 1456)
- Li Zhen (female general) (1908–1990), first female general of the Chinese People's Liberation Army
- Li Zhen (Minister of Public Security) (1914–1973), Chinese general and Minister of Public Security
- Li Zhen (Shandong politician) (1924–2018), chairman of Shandong People's Congress
- Li Chen (artist) (born 1963), Taiwanese sculptor
- Li Zhen (synchronised swimmer) (born 1979), Chinese synchronized swimmer
- Li Zhen (canoeist) (born 1985), Chinese sprint canoeist

== See also ==
- Li Chen (disambiguation)
