= Chongli =

Chongli may refer to:

- Chongli, Zhangjiakou, a district of China
- Zhurong or Chongli, a Chinese mythological figure

== See also ==
- Chen Li (disambiguation)
- Chun Li (disambiguation)
- Zhurong (disambiguation)
