= Li Chen =

Li Chen may refer to:

- Emperor Xuānzong of Tang (810–859), emperor of the Tang dynasty
- Li Chen (artist) (born 1963), Taiwanese sculptor
- Li Chen (actor) (born 1978), Chinese actor
- Li Chen (diplomat), Chinese diplomat
- Li Chen, a character played by Nelson Lee in the 1997–2003 HBO series Oz
- Li Chen (footballer), Chinese footballer
- Chen Li (singer) Chinese singer, song writer

== See also ==
- Lichen (disambiguation)
- Li Zhen (disambiguation), spelled "Li Chen" in Wade–Giles romanization
- Chen Li (disambiguation)
