= Teng Daiyuan =

Chinese politician

- 滕代远
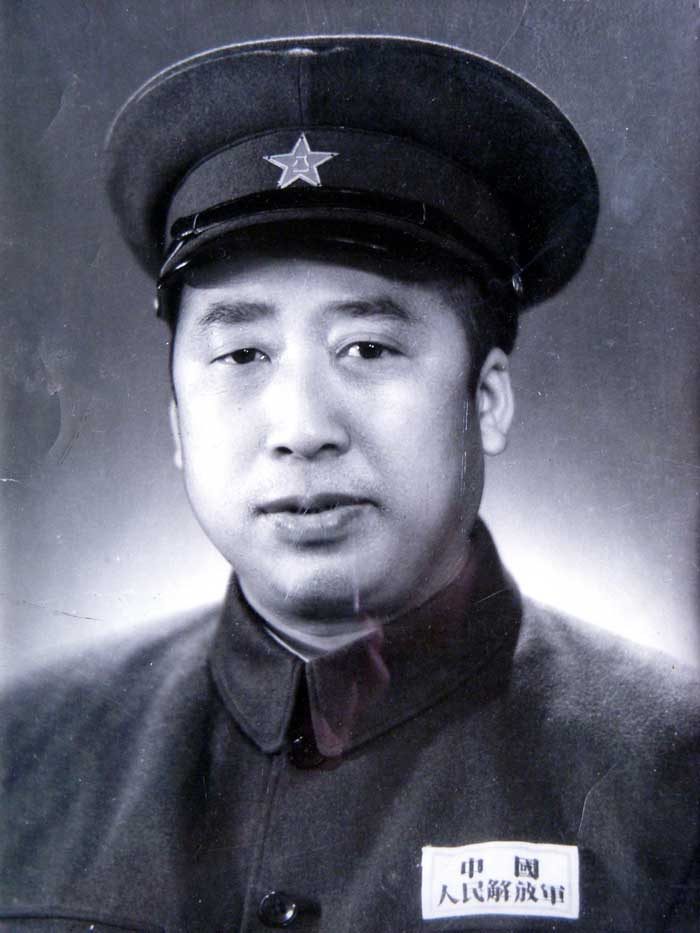

Minister of Railways of the People's Republic of China
- In office September 1954 – January 1965
- Premier: Zhou Enlai
- Preceded by: Position established
- Succeeded by: Lü Zhengcao

Personal details
- Born: November 2, 1904 Mayang, Hunan, Qing China
- Died: December 1, 1974 (aged 70) Beijing, China
- Party: Chinese Communist Party
- Education: International Lenin School

Military service
- Allegiance: China
- Branch/service: Chinese Workers' and Peasants' Red Army; Eighth Route Army; People's Liberation Army
- Years of service: 1928–1949
- Rank: Lieutenant general
- Battles/wars: Chinese Civil War; Second Sino-Japanese War

Teng Daiyuan (Chinese: 滕代远; November 2, 1904 – December 1, 1974) was a military leader of the People's Liberation Army, a senior leader of the Chinese Communist Party, and a politician of the People's Republic of China. After formation of the People's Republic of China, Teng served as the first Minister of Railways.

== Early life ==
Teng was born on 2 November 1904 in Mayang, Hunan, to a family of Miao ethnicity. In 1923, he was admitted to the Hunan Public Second Normal School in Changde, where he organized the Mayang New People Society and founded the publication Jinjiang Tide.

== Revolutionary career ==
In October 1924, he joined the Communist Youth League of China, and in the spring of 1925, he joined the Kuomintang. Later that same year, in October, he transferred to the Chinese Communist Party, where he led student movements. After 1926, he served as the Secretary of the Communist Youth League in Pingjiang County, Hunan. He was then transferred to the outskirts of Changsha, where he held positions as the Chairman of the Hunan Provincial Farmers' Association and the Secretary of the Suburban District Committee, actively promoting the peasant movement.

=== Chinese Civil War ===
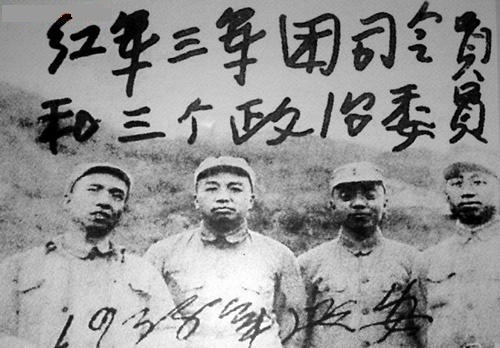
Photo taken in Yan'an of the political commissar and former commanders of the Third Red Army, which had been based in Hunan before the Long March. From left: Li Fuchun, Peng Dehuai, Yang Shangkun and Teng Daiyuan.

Following the Changsha coup in 1927, Teng went underground. In August, he was appointed as a member of the Hunan Provincial Committee and Chairman of the Provincial Farmers' Association. Shortly afterward, he took on the role of Secretary of the Xiangdong Special Committee in Jiangxi, while concurrently serving as Secretary of the Liling County Committee. In June 1928, Teng became the Secretary of the Hunan–Hubei–Jiangxi Soviet Border Special Committee, where he focused on youth movements, the peasant movement, and military organization efforts.

On 17 July 1928, following directives from the Hunan Provincial Committee, Teng arrived in Pingjiang and established contact with the party organization of the 1st Regiment of the Independent 1st Division of the 8th Army of the National Revolutionary Army. On 22 July, he, along with Regiment Commander Peng Dehuai, led the Pingjiang Uprising. Following the uprising, he led his forces in combat along the Hunan-Jiangxi border region. In early December, Peng Dehuai and Teng Daiyuan successfully joined forces with the Fourth Red Army of the Chinese Red Army, led by Zhu De and Mao Zedong, at Jinggangshan, Jiangxi. Teng was subsequently appointed Deputy Political Commissar of the Fourth Red Army and Political Commissar of the 30th Regiment.

On January 1, 1929, the Nationalist forces launched their third encirclement campaign against Jinggangshan. On January 4, Communist leaders in Jinggangshan held a four-day meeting in Bailu Village, Ninggang County, Jiangxi, where they decided that Mao Zedong and Zhu De would lead the main force of the Fourth Red Army in an offensive while leaving Peng Dehuai and Teng Daiyuan to defend Jinggangshan. Teng and Peng subsequently commanded the Fifth Red Army and Wang Zuo’s forces to repel Nationalist attacks on Jinggangshan. However, facing overwhelming enemy strength, Jinggangshan eventually fell, and Peng led a breakout with heavy losses, leaving only 283 survivors from the Red Army units.

The small remaining force successfully conducted a surprise attack on Yudu County, Jiangxi, but Teng was injured due to an accidental firearm discharge. In September, an expanded meeting of the Hunan–Hubei–Jiangxi Soviet Border Special Committee decided to restructure the Fifth Red Army, expanding it to five brigades, with Teng appointed as Political Commissar. By mid-June 1930, the Fifth Red Army was expanded into the Third Red Army Corps, with Teng as its commissar. On July 27, he and Peng Dehuai captured Changsha but had to withdraw under heavy assault from He Jian’s forces 11 days later. On August 23, the Third Red Army Corps joined with the First Red Army Corps in Yonghe in Liuyang, Hunan, establishing the First Front Army of the Chinese Workers' and Peasants' Red Army. Teng was appointed Deputy General Political Commissar and subsequently took part in the First through Fourth Encirclement Campaigns in the Central Soviet Area.

In 1932, Teng participated in the battles in the border region of Guangdong and Jiangxi. In July 1933, he became the Political Commissar of the Eastern Army, leading forces in combat in Fujian. However, by the end of 1933, Teng faced marginalization due to the influence of Wang Ming and Bo Gu and was forced to leave his position in the Third Red Army Corps, being reassigned as Director of the Armament Mobilization Department under the Central Military Commission. In July 1934, Teng traveled to the Soviet Union to attend the 7th World Congress of the Comintern and studied at the Red Army Military Academy and the International Lenin School. In the spring of 1937, he returned to Xinjiang, where he and Chen Yun organized the reception of remnants of the Western Route Army in Dihua, Xinjiang, establishing the Eighth Route Army office in Xinjiang.

=== Second Sino-Japanese War ===
In December 1937, Teng returned to Yan'an and was appointed Chief of Staff of the Central Military Commission of the Chinese Communist Party. He played a key role in strengthening the political work of the Eighth Route Army and the New Fourth Army. After the Jin-Xi Incident in the winter of 1939, he was ordered to the northwestern Shanxi to direct military operations.

In 1940, Teng was transferred to serve as vice president and Deputy Political Commissar of the Anti-Japanese Military and Political University, while also becoming a standing committee member of the CCP Northern Bureau. He dedicated his efforts to training anti-Japanese military and political cadres in the Taihang anti-Japanese base area. In August 1942, after the death of Zuo Quan, Teng became the Chief of Staff of the Eighth Route Army's forward command and also took on the role of Director of the Intelligence Department. During this period, communist bases faced dual blockades from both Japanese and Nationalist forces.

In 1944, Teng and Yang Lisan proposed the "Teng-Yang Scheme" to conserve resources and maintain logistics within Chinese communist military units. In August 1945, as Japan prepared to surrender, Teng led his troops in counteroffensive operations against the Japanese forces, successfully reclaiming vast amounts of lost territory.

=== Second part of Chinese Civil War ===
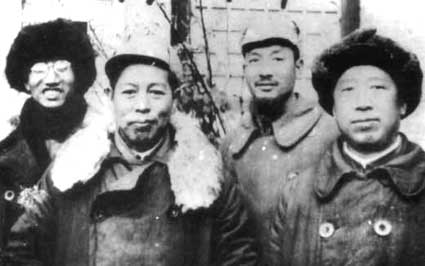
The leaders of the Shanxi-Hebei-Shandong-Henan Military Region. From left to right: Xu Xiangqian, Wang Shiying, Zhou Shidi and Teng Daiyuan (1947)

After the Second Sino-Japanese War, Teng Daiyuan was appointed Deputy Commander of the Jin-Ji-Lu-Yu (Shanxi-Hebei-Shandong-Henan) Military Region. In 1946, Teng went to Beiping as a military advisor to Ye Jianying, a representative of the CCP at the Military Mediation Executive Department. While wearing the rank of lieutenant general in the National Revolutionary Army, he assisted Ye in mediating military conflicts, overseeing the implementation of army reorganization plans, restoring transportation, disarming enemy forces, and repatriating Japanese prisoners of war.

In July 1946, to ensure that Liu Bocheng and Deng Xiaoping could lead the main forces to carry out key combat missions, Teng and Bo Yibo took charge of leadership responsibilities in the military region. By July 1947, after the Jin-Ji-Lu-Yu Field Army advanced into the Dabie Mountains, Teng and Bo began organizing the North China Field Army under the People's Liberation Army (PLA) to support Xu Xiangqian's decisive battles against Yan Xishan's forces in Shanxi.

In April 1948, Teng was appointed Deputy Commander of the North China Military Region and became a member of the Standing Committee of the CCP North China Bureau. In November 1948, he was appointed Minister of Railways for the Central Military Commission and later also served as Commander of the Railway Corps.

== Political career ==
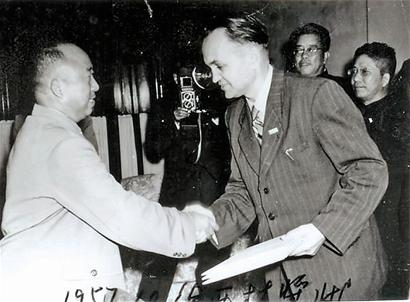
Teng (left) awards honorary certificate to Konstantin S. Silin, the team leader of Soviet engineers who took part in the construction of Wuhan Yangtze River Bridge (1957)

After the establishment of the People's Republic of China, Teng Daiyuan served as the Minister of Railways in the Central People's Government and the People's Republic of China. He was a pioneer in the development of China's railway system and the founder of the Railway Corps. Under his leadership, several major projects were completed in the first decade after the country's founding, including the construction of the Chengdu–Chongqing railway, the Tianshui-Lanzhou Railway, the Fengsha Railway, the Baotou–Lanzhou railway, the Liuzhou-Zhanjiang Railway, the Baoji–Chengdu railway, the Yingtan–Xiamen railway, and the Wuhan Yangtze River Bridge. By the end of 1958, the total length of China's railway network had reached 53,000 kilometers.

In 1958, he took a leave of absence due to illness, and Lü Zhengcao assumed responsibility for the Ministry of Railways, eventually taking over the position in 1965.

In January 1965, Teng Daiyuan was elected Vice Chairman of the Fourth National Committee of the Chinese People's Political Consultative Conference. He was also a member of the 7th, 8th, 9th, and 10th Central Committees of the Chinese Communist Party and served as a member of the National Defense Commission during the first three terms of the People's Republic of China.

During the Cultural Revolution, Teng suffered persecution and was sent to Conghua County in Guangdong with his family where he was placed under house arrest. Following the 1971 Lin Biao incident and the crushing of the 'Lin Biao counter-revolutionary group', Teng and his family were allowed to return to Beijing in 1972. Despite suffering from illness, he attended the 10th National Congress of the Chinese Communist Party where he became member of the Central Committee. Following the congress, Teng's health worsened including losing his ability to speak. He died at a hospital in Beijing on 1 December 1974, at the age of 70. Teng's memorial service was presided by then Vice Chairman of the Chinese Communist Party Ye Jianying and Deng Xiaoping delivered the eulogy.

== Family life ==
In 1938, Teng married Lin Yi, who served as an intelligence officer in the Eighth Route Army. The couple had five sons. Their youngest son, Teng Jiuxin, served as the deputy manager of the Railway Travel Agency and director of the China Railway Museum.

== Bibliography ==
- Domes, Jurgen. Peng Te-huai: The Man and the Image, London: C. Hurst & Company. 1985. ISBN 0905838998.

Government offices
New title	Minister of Railways of the People's Republic of China; 1949–1965	Succeeded by Lü Zhengcao
