= Jiang Liyin =

Jiang Liyin (Chinese: 江礼银; 1933 – September 25, 1993) is a Chinese Communist politician and revolutionary agitator, who was a prominent member of the Fujian provincial leadership during the Cultural Revolution. He was later disgraced and expelled from the Chinese Communist Party for his activities during the Cultural Revolution.

== Biography ==
Born Jiang Hui (江辉) in Minhou County, Fujian province, Jiang joined the Communist Party in March 1960, and had completed middle school education. He began working in the railways bureau in Hangzhou in 1956, then was transferred back to his native Fuzhou to work in the local railway bureau. In 1966, he participated in the Cultural Revolution and became a member of the organizing committee of the Revolutionary Committee of Fujian province. In May 1968, he became the deputy head of the Revolutionary Committee of the Fuzhou Railway Bureau. In August, he was named a member of the Fujian Revolutionary Committee and the "worker's propaganda chief" to the Fujian Medical College. In February 1975 he was named a Standing Committee member and secretary of the Party Committee of Fujian.

After the prominent leftists of the Cultural Revolution were put on trial and purged, Jiang was also disgraced and demoted; In April 1979, he was sent down to Pucheng County to serve as a mere county-level deputy head. In July 1980, he was returned to work in the railways bureau in Xiangfan. In January 1985, due to his involvement in the Cultural Revolution, Jiang was expelled from the Chinese Communist Party and removed from his posts. In March 1985, he began working as an ordinary inspection officer in the railways bureau.

Jiang was a member of the 9th, 10th, and 11th Central Committees of the Chinese Communist Party. He died in Fuzhou in 1993.
