= Li Dazhang =

Chinese politician (1900–1976)

Li Dazhang (Chinese: 李大章) (December 1900 – May 3, 1976) was a Chinese politician. He was born in Hejiang County, Luzhou, Sichuan Province.

== Biography ==
In 1920 Li went to France on the same work-study leave scheme attended by numerous high level Communist leaders. Subsequently, from 1924 to 1927 he studied at the Communist University of the Toilers of the East in Moscow, Soviet Union. From 1955 to 1965 Li was governor of his home province and then briefly Chinese Communist Party Committee Secretary of neighboring Guizhou Province.

Li's career was not significantly damaged by the ravages of the Cultural Revolution and in April 1969 he was elected to the 9th Central Committee of the Chinese Communist Party and re-elected to the 10th in August 1973. During this time he maintained leadership roles in Sichuan although not at the highest levels. His big break occurred in November 1975 when he was moved to Beijing to head up the powerful United Front Work Department of the CCP. This all proved short-lived as he died only six months later in Beijing.

| Preceded by Li Jingquan | Governor of Sichuan | Succeeded by Zhang Guohua |
| Preceded by Zhou Lin | Party Secretary of Guizhou; 1964–1965 | Succeeded by Jia Qiyun |
