= Cao Lihuai =

Chinese politician and general (1909–1998)

- 曹里怀
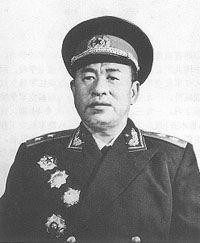
- Born: 15 November 1909; Hunan, Qing dynasty
- Died: 19 May 1998 (aged 88)
- Military career
- Allegiance: Chinese Communist Party; China
- Branch: People's Liberation Army Ground Force; People's Liberation Army Air Force
- Awards: Order of August 1 (1st Class Medal) (1955); Order of Independence and Freedom (1st Class Medal) (1955); Order of Liberation (1st Class Medal) (1955)

Cao Lihuai (Chinese: 曹里怀; pinyin: Cáo Lǐhuái; Wade–Giles: Ts'ao Li-huai; November 15, 1909 – May 19, 1998) was a founding lieutenant general of the People's Liberation Army, a Deputy to the Third National People's Congress, and a member of the Ninth, Tenth, and Eleventh Central Committees of the Chinese Communist Party.

== Life ==
Cao was born in Zixing, Hunan province on November 15, 1909. As a teenaged student Cao was an enthusiastic supporter of the Northern Expedition and attempted to join the National Revolutionary Army, although he was rejected on account of his age. In early 1928, however, Cao learned that the Communist General Zhu De was leading an army in southern Hunan. He and a friend got a letter of recommendation from the local party secretary and walked the 120 miles to find the Chinese Red Army. They were assigned to the second company of the Second Battalion. They accompanied the army when it marched north to join Mao Zedong in the Jinggang Mountains. Cao Lihuai quickly rose through the ranks, and had served as both a propaganda secretary and a staff officer by 1930. Although he was accused of being part of the Anti-Bolshevik League and tortured, he refused to confess and Zhu De intervened to have him released. His promotions continued and by 1932 he was chief of staff for the Seventh Division in the Fourth Red Army. He got an opportunity to serve as a division commander during the fourth anti-encirclement campaign when his superior officer was wounded, and proved capable in battle. Cao was then sent to the Red Army University in Ruijin to get advanced military training. His first field command was as commander of the International Division in December 1933. In June of the following year, he was transferred to the Fifth Red Army Corps as chief of staff. In the leadership struggles that took place during the Long March, Zhang Guotao had Cao purged from the Party and dismissed from his army post. He was once again spared from execution because of Zhu De's intervention. Cao would spend the next few years as an instructor at the Red Army University. His party membership was eventually restored.

After a brief stint with the Eighth Route Army at the start of the Second Sino-Japanese War, Cao would spend the next 5 years as chief of staff of the Left-behind Corps. In 1942, at the Party Congress of the Shaanxi-Gansu-Ningxia Border Region, he was elected as a representative to the Community Party's Seventh National Congress. In 1943, he enrolled in the Central Party School and participated in the Yan'an Rectification Movement. Following the policy of launching offensive operations and consolidating and expanding the anti-Japanese base areas, in the spring and summer of 1945, battles were launched in Nanle, Dongping, Yanggu, Haizi and east of Anyang, connecting the liberated areas of Hebei, Shandong and Henan into a large area.

In the aftermath of Japan's surrender, Cao Lihuai led the regiment of soldiers that escorted Lin Biao and Xiao Jinguang from Puyang to Manchuria. Peng Zhen then assigned Cao to command of Changchun's garrison. On December 14, 1945, he was forced to withdraw from the urban area of Changchun because of discipline problems with the local militias that had been recruited into the new People's Liberation Army. By April 1946 these issues had been resolved, and Cao was able to lead the recapturing of the city. For the rest of the Civil War he served as military commander of northern Jilin. For his service in the Civil War and WWII, in 1955 he was awarded the August 1 Medal, the Independence and Freedom Medal, and the Liberation Medal (all First Class).

In April 1952, he was transferred to the Air Force and became commander the Central South Military Region (later the Guangzhou Military Region). In 1955, he would be promoted to lieutenant general. In June 1956, Cao was promoted to deputy commander of the Air Force and director of the Air Force Military Training Department (he would continue to concurrently serve as the commander of the Guangzhou Military Region until September 1957). In this position, he helped develop a number of manuals, textbooks, and procurement standards for the Air Force. After the Lin Biao incident in 1971, he became the leader of the five-member Air Force Group and he presided over the work of the Air Force until May 1973.

Cao retired in November 1982, although he remained involved in party and military affairs. In January 1983, he returned to his hometown of Zixing. He died on May 19, 1998, at the age of 88.

== Memorial ==
In 2011, Cao Lihuai's former residence became a Historical or Cultural Site protected by Hunan Province.
