= Hu Jizong =

Chinese politician

Hu Jizong (Chinese: 胡继宗) (1920 – July 4, 1974) was a Chinese politician. He was born in Suning County, Hebei Province. He worked in Lingling District, Yongzhou, Hunan Province from June 1951 to September 1952 and in Xiangtan, Hunan Province from September 1952 to November 1954. He was member of the Hunan provincial party office (November 1954 – June 1956) and Hunan provincial government (May – December 1957). He was Chinese Communist Party Committee Secretary of Gansu in November 1966. He was a member of the 9th Central Committee of the Chinese Communist Party (1969–1971) and the 10th Central Committee of the Chinese Communist Party in 1973. He died in Lanzhou.

| Preceded by Wang Feng | Communist Party Chief of Gansu; 1966 | Succeeded by Xian Henghan |
