= Lai Jifa =

Chinese Minister of Building Materials Industry from 1956 to 1958 and 1965 to 1970

- 赖际发

Minister of Building Materials Industry
- In office March 1965 – February 1958
- Premier: Zhou Enlai
- Preceded by: Vacant
- Succeeded by: Song Yangchu
- In office May 1956 – February 1958
- Premier: Zhou Enlai
- Preceded by: New title
- Succeeded by: Vacant

Personal details
- Born: October 29, 1910 Yongding County, Fujian, Qing China
- Died: 24 February 1982 (aged 71) Beijing, China
- Party: Chinese Communist Party

Chinese name
- Simplified Chinese: 赖际发
- Traditional Chinese: 賴際發
Transcriptions
Standard Mandarin
- Hanyu Pinyin: Lài Jìfā

Lai Jifa (Chinese: 赖际发; 29 October 1910 – 24 February 1982) was a Chinese politician who served two separate terms as Minister of Building Materials Industry from 1956 to 1958 and 1965 to 1970.

Lai was a representative of the 7th, 8th, and 9th National Congress of the Chinese Communist Party. He was a member of the 9th Central Committee of the Chinese Communist Party. He was a delegate to the 1st, 2nd, and 4th National People's Congress. He was a member of the 3rd National Committee of the Chinese People's Political Consultative Conference and a member of the Standing Committee of the 4th and 5th Chinese People's Political Consultative Conference.

== Biography ==
Lai was born in Yongding County (now Yongding District), Fujian, on 29 October 1910, during the late Qing dynasty (1644–1911). He joined the Communist Youth League of China in the autumn of 1926 and the Chinese Communist Party (CCP) in November 1928. He took part in the Red Army in October 1929 and mainly worked in the Western Fujian Revolutionary Base Area.

In October 1934, he participated in the Long March, a forced expedition over 12,500 kilometers in the 1930s.

During the Second Sino-Japanese War, he served in the 129th Division of the Eighth Route Army in north China's Shanxi province.

After the establishment of the Communist State, in 1956, he was promoted to minister of the newly founded Ministry of Building Materials Industry.

On 24 February 1982, he died of an illness in Beijing, at the age of 71.

Government offices
New title	Minister of Building Materials Industry; 1956–1958	Succeeded by Vacant
Preceded by Vacant	Minister of Building Materials Industry; 1965–1970	Succeeded by Song Yangchu
