= Lichen Lake =

Lichen Lake may refer to:

- Lichen Lake (Opawica River), Quebec, Canada
- Lichen Lake (Minnesota), United States

== See also ==
- Lichen (disambiguation)
