= Peng Shaohui =

Chinese general (1906–1978)

- 彭绍辉
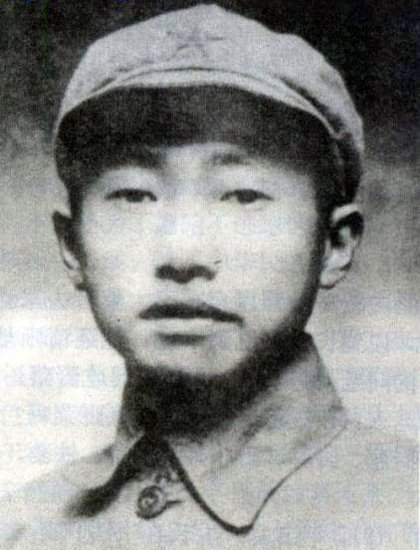
- Peng in 1936.

Deputy Commander of the People's Liberation Army
- In office August 1969 – April 1978
- In office October 1954 – August 1967

Deputy Commander of the Northwest Military Region
- In office 1952–1955

Chief of Staff of the Northwest Military Region
- In office 1952–1955

Personal details
- Born: September 6, 1906 Yanglin, Shaoshan, Hunan, Qing China
- Died: April 25, 1978 (aged 71) Beijing, China
- Party: Chinese Communist Party
- Spouse: Zhang Wei
- Children: 4
- Education: Central Party School of the Chinese Communist Party
- Nickname: One-Armed General (独臂将军)

Military service
- Allegiance: People's Republic of China
- Branch/service: People's Liberation Army Ground Force
- Years of service: 1928–1978
- Commands: Northwest Military Region
- Battles/wars: Second Sino-Japanese War; Chinese Civil War

Peng Shaohui (simplified Chinese: 彭绍辉; traditional Chinese: 彭紹輝; pinyin: Péng Shàohuī; 6 September 1906 – 25 April 1978) was a Chinese general of the People's Liberation Army (PLA). He lost his left arm in 1933 during the fourth encirclement campaign, and he was known as the One-Armed General. In 1955, he was one of ten one-armed officers given rank in the PLA's first conferment of ranks, and one of only two among them made a full general.

After 1949, Peng founded the First Advanced Infantry School and served as a deputy chief of the General Staff and as vice president of the Academy of Military Sciences. He became a member of the Central Military Commission in 1969.

== Early life ==
Peng was born on 6 September 1906 in Shaoshan, Xiangtan County, Hunan. His family was poor, and after his father died he herded cattle for a landlord, becoming a farm labourer at the age of 16. Mao Zedong, who came from the same area, affectionately called him a fellow townsman.

At the age of 20, Peng joined a peasant association, where he impressed Mao, who was then investigating the peasant movement in Hunan. In 1926, he also joined the peasant Red Guards. After the Changsha coup of May 1927, he took part in the peasant militia's attack on Changsha, and when it failed he left home to seek out Mao. In Wuhan, he enlisted as a private in the 35th Army of the National Revolutionary Army.

== Red Army ==
In the spring of 1928, Peng attended a training school run by Communists in his unit, which had by then become the Hunan Independent 5th Division. In July 1928, he took part in the Pingjiang Uprising in Pingjiang County and joined the Red Army as a squad leader in the 7th Regiment of its 5th Army, and in the autumn of that year he joined the Chinese Communist Party with Huang Gonglue as his sponsor. He was seriously wounded during a breakout in the spring of 1929, while serving as a company commander.

From 1930, Peng served in the Red 3rd Army Group as a regimental commander, as a divisional chief of staff and as commander of its 1st Division, and he took part in the attacks on Changsha and in the defence of the Central Soviet Area against the Nationalist encirclement campaigns. According to the Study Times, he was wounded six times in five years, four of them seriously, including bullet wounds to his right leg and a shattered jaw.

In the fighting at Caotaigang in March 1933, during the fourth encirclement campaign, Peng led a charge that captured Pili Mountain and seriously wounded Xiao Qian, the commander of the Nationalist 11th Division. While pursuing the retreating enemy, he was hit in the left arm by two bullets that shattered the bone. At the request of Peng Dehuai, doctors made three attempts to save the arm, but it had to be amputated. The Study Times describes him as the first one-armed general in the history of the Chinese revolution. He taught himself to tie his leg wrappings and ride a horse with one hand, and he turned down a safer post to return to the front, a decision that Zhou Enlai praised. In August 1933, he received the Red Star Medal, second class.

From September 1933, Peng commanded the 5th Division, known as the Xingguo Model Division, and then the 34th Division and the 15th Division, known as the Young Communist International Division. His jaw was wounded in the fifth encirclement campaign. In August 1934, he and Xiao Hua moved the 15th Division from Qingliu to Hongtian in Yong'an, Fujian, where it supported the eastern defences of the Red 1st Army Group, according to extracts from his diary.

== Long March ==
In October 1934, Peng set out on the Long March, serving as head of the education section of the Red 1st Army Group's headquarters and then as commander of the Red 3rd Army Group's training battalion. In 1935, he became chief of staff of the 30th Army of the Red Fourth Front Army, and he later taught at the Red Army University. He opposed Zhang Guotao's attempt to split the party and was nearly executed as a result, according to the Study Times. In June 1936, he became chief of staff of the 6th Army Group of the Red 2nd Front Army.

== Second Sino-Japanese War ==
Peng in 1939

During the Second Sino-Japanese War, Peng headed the operations section of the headquarters of the 120th Division of the Eighth Route Army and commanded its training regiment. He became commander of the New 358th Brigade in April 1939, and in 1940 he took command of the division's 2nd Independent Brigade, which fought in the Hundred Regiments Offensive. From November 1940, he also commanded the 2nd Sub-district of the Jin–Sui Military Region.

In 1942, Peng studied at the Central Party School of the Chinese Communist Party. In 1943, he became a vice president of the Counter-Japanese Military and Political University and principal of its 7th Branch.

== Chinese Civil War ==
During the Chinese Civil War, Peng served as deputy commander and later commander of the Lüliang Military Region, and as deputy commander of the 2nd Column of the Jin–Sui Field Army. He fought in the Lüliang and Fenxiao campaigns. In July 1948, he became commander of the 7th Column of the Northwest Field Army, which became the 7th Army of the First Field Army, and he took part in the Jinzhong campaign and the Taiyuan Campaign.

In the summer of 1949, Peng led the pursuit of Nationalist forces in eastern Gansu, crossed the Guan Mountains and took Tianshui. In 1950, he directed the suppression of bandits in southern Gansu and in Sichuan, and he oversaw the reorganisation of Nationalist units that had defected.

== People's Republic of China ==
Peng with He Bingyan in Lanzhou in 1952

In 1951, Peng was ordered to establish the First Advanced Infantry School in Tianshui, and he became its first principal. In 1952, he became chief of staff and then deputy commander and chief of staff of the Northwest Military Region.

In 1955, Peng became a deputy chief of the General Staff of the People's Liberation Army and deputy director of the Training Inspectorate. In the same year, he was made a general (shangjiang), and of the ten one-armed officers given rank in 1955, only he and He Bingyan were made full generals. At the end of 1957, he became a vice president of the Academy of Military Sciences, helping Ye Jianying to establish the academy. He returned to the post of deputy chief of the General Staff in 1960.

Peng with Zhou Enlai and Xiao Hua in July 1964

Peng became a member of the Central Military Commission in 1969. He was a member of the 9th, 10th and 11th Central Committees of the party, of the Standing Committee of the National People's Congress in its second to fourth terms and of the first to third National Defence Councils.

== Death ==
Peng was diagnosed with an aortic aneurysm in 1970. He died in Beijing on 25 April 1978, after the aneurysm ruptured while he was working at his desk. According to the Changsha Anti-Japanese War Culture Research Association, he collapsed during a meeting on air force operations and died at 12:35 am.

== Personal life ==
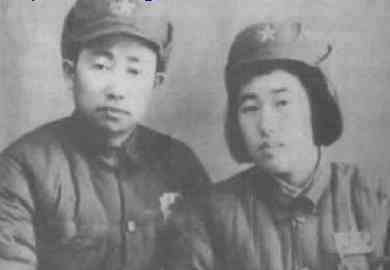
Peng and his wife Zhang Wei in Tianshui in 1949

In April 1949, after the Taiyuan campaign, Peng married Zhang Wei, who had been introduced to him by a matchmaker and later travelled to Tianshui to join him. Their son Peng Zhiqiang was born in 1951. Peng set family rules that barred his children from the headquarters and from using official cars. He was known for his frugality, refusing extra rations during the war and a nutrition allowance in 1946, mending his own socks and keeping the same quilt from the early 1950s onwards.

== Honours ==
- Chinese Soviet Republic
  - Red Star Medal, second class (1933)
- China
  - Order of Bayi, first class (1955)
  - Order of Independence and Freedom, first class (1955)
  - Order of Liberation, first class (1955)
