= Zeng Siyu =

Chinese military personnel (1911–2012)

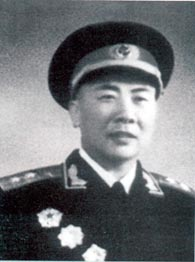
- Military career
- Allegiance: People's Republic of China
- Branch: People's Liberation Army
- Commands: 64th Army
- Conflicts: Second Sino-Japanese War; Chinese Civil War; Korean War; Battle of the Imjin River; First Battle of Maryang San

Zeng Siyu (Chinese: 曾思玉; 2 February 1911 – December 31, 2012) was a Chinese politician and People's Liberation Army lieutenant general. He was born in Xinfeng County, Jiangxi Province. He was a veteran of the Second Sino-Japanese War and the Chinese Civil War. He was Chinese Communist Party Committee Secretary and Governor of Hubei Province.

By July 1969 he was a member of the Central Military Commission, representing Wuhan, he was also deputy commander of the Shenyang military region.

He was a member of the 9th, 10th and 11th Central Committees of the Chinese Communist Party between April 1969 and September 1982.

Preceded by Zhang Tixue	Communist Party Chief and Governor of Hubei	Succeeded by Zhao Xinchu
