= Chen Li =

Chen Li may refer to:

- Chen Li (emperor) (died 1408), second and the last emperor of the Chen Han regime in the late Yuan dynasty of China
- Chen Li (scholar) (1810–1882), Cantonese scholar of the evidential research school
- Chen Li (singer) (born 1990), Chinese singer
- Chen Li (tennis) (1971), Chinese tennis player
- Chen Li (film director), Chinese film director
- Chen Li (psychologist), a Chinese psychologist.

== See also ==
- Li Chen (disambiguation)
