= Lichen verrucosus et reticularis =

- Specialty: Dermatology

Lichen verrucosus et reticularis is a cutaneous condition that may be related to keratosis lichenoides chronica.

== See also ==
- List of cutaneous conditions
