= Lichenoid trikeratosis =

- Specialty: Dermatology

Lichenoid trikeratosis is a cutaneous condition that may be related to keratosis lichenoides chronica.

== See also ==
- List of cutaneous conditions
