= Wu Guixian =

Chinese politician (1938–2025)

- 吴桂贤

Vice Premier of China
- In office 1975–1977
- Premier: Zhou Enlai→Hua Guofeng

Personal details
- Born: 16 February 1938 Gongyi, Henan, China
- Died: 25 April 2025 (aged 87)
- Party: Chinese Communist Party

Wu Guixian (Chinese: 吴桂贤; pinyin: Wú Guìxián; 16 February 1938 – 25 April 2025) was a Chinese politician who served as China's first female vice premier from January 1975 to September 1977. Originally a worker at a state-owned cotton factory in Xianyang, she was appointed by party leader Mao Zedong after becoming the factory's deputy director and a member of the Central Committee of the Chinese Communist Party.

== Early life and career ==
Wu was born in Gongyi, Henan Province on 16 February 1938, to a large peasant family of farmers consisting of nine siblings. In the wake of the Chinese famine of 1942–43 the family fled to Xianyang, Shaanxi where her father found temporary work. To earn the family more money Wu joined a cotton factory recruitment program in 1951 at the age of 13. Child labour laws at the time mandated recruits be at least 16 however Wu lied about her age and began work at a state-owned textile factory in the city. A few years later, in 1955, she joined the Chinese Communist Youth League and soon after the Chinese Communist Party at the age of 20. Eventually she was promoted to deputy director of the Northwest China cotton factory and party leaders arranged for her to study at Northwest University where she graduated in 1968.

== Political career ==
Wu rose from township-level politics to become a national leader in only seven years. In 1969 Wu attended the 9th National Party Congress and was elected a member of Central Committee of the Chinese Communist Party serving as deputy secretary of the CPC Shaanxi Provincial Committee. Around this time party leader Chairman Mao planned to promote grassroots officials to help run state affairs following the damage caused to the party during the Cultural Revolution. Wu was elected to serve as Chinese vice premier in 1975, becoming the first woman to hold this office. In 1977 Wu resigned from office and returned to Shaanxi to serve as deputy secretary of the Party committee of Northwest China Cotton Factory.

== Death ==
Wu died on 25 April 2025, at the age of 87.
