= Chen Li (singer) =

Chinese singer (born 1990)

Chen Li (traditional Chinese: 陳粒; simplified Chinese: 陈粒; pinyin: Chén Lì; born 26 July 1990) is a Chinese folk song singer, independent musician, singer-songwriter, and former lead singer of the Dreamer Band (空想家乐队). She was born in Guiyang, Guizhou and graduated from Shanghai University of International Business and Economics.

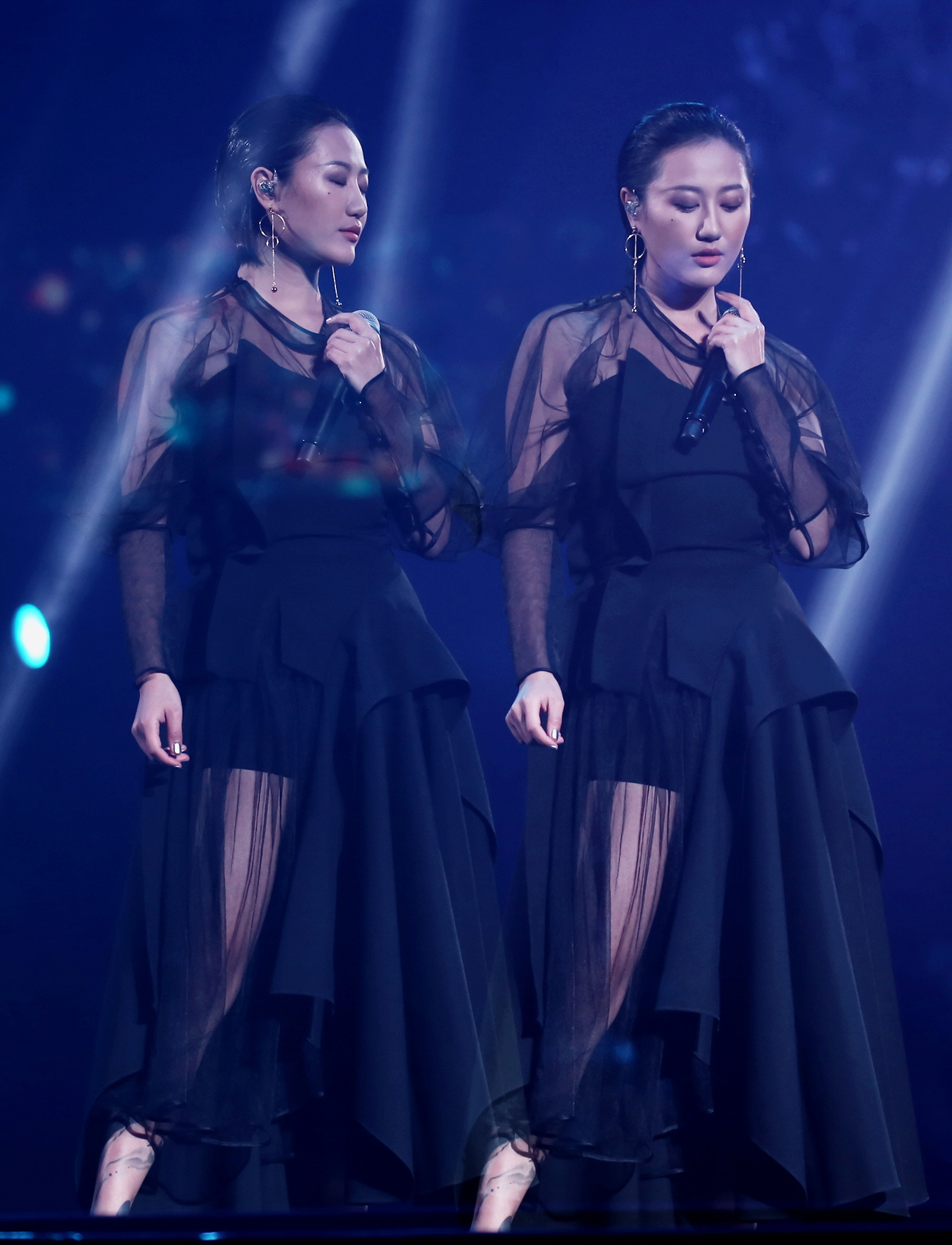
Chen Li at Migu Music Festival

== Music career ==
- In 2014, along with the Dreamer Band (空想家乐队) released the band's first EP (extended play) album "Wan Xiang" (万象); "Qi Miao Neng Li Ge" (奇妙能力歌) was shortlisted for the annual folk single of the "Abilu Music Awards 2014".
- In 2015, she released her first personal music album "Ru Ye" (如也).
- In 2016, she won the most popular musician (folk) of the "Abilu Music Awards 2015"; she also released the first single "Huan Qi Yi" (幻期颐) and a new album "Xiao Meng Da Ban" (小梦大半).
- In 2017, she composed and vocalized the theme song "My Dear Art" for the documentary "My Dear Art" (一个人的收藏).
- In 2017, she took part in the show "Happy Boys" (快乐男声) as the music instructor. On February 22, 2017, she released her solo single "Xi Tai" (戏台); on March 7, she released an original single "Hao Zai" (好在) that was used as the ending song of the Web Drama "Solaso Bistro"(问题餐厅); On March 28, she released another single "Qing Zhu" (庆祝).
- On January 5, 2018, she released the single "Yan Shan Tu" (研山图).

== Discography ==
=== Regular Albums ===
Regular Albums
| Order of Release | Title | Release date | Language | Track listing |
|---|---|---|---|---|
| 1 | Ru Ye(如也) | 2015.2.1 | Mandarin | Track: 1. Bu Mie(不灭); 2. Ru Ye(如也); 3. Qi Miao Neng Li Ge(奇妙能力歌); 4. Li Li Wan Xiang(历历万乡); 5. Guang(光); 6. Tan De(贪得); 7. Qi Lou(七楼); 8. Yi Ran Yi Bao Zha(易燃易爆炸); 9. Jue Dui Zhan You Xiang Dui Zi You(绝对占有 相对自由); 10. Tuo Jiang(脱缰); 11. Zou Ma(走马); 12. Zhu Xing(祝星); 13. Zheng Qu Guo Shang Guo(正趣果上果); 14. 20 Times You; 15. Wu Yan(五言) |
| 2 | Xiao Meng Da Ban(小梦大半) | 2016.7.26 | Mandarin | Track: 1. Fang Cao Di(芳草地); 2. Guai Bu De(怪不得); 3. Xiao Ban(小半); 4. Qiao Dou Ma Dai(桥豆麻袋); 5. Ren Zhao Mu(任朝暮); 6. Wu Sheng Wu(无生无); 7. Da Meng(大梦); 8. Zi Du(自渡); 9. Xu Ni(虚拟); 10. Shui Ba(睡吧) |
| 3 | Zai Peng Lai(在蓬莱) in Blue Note Beijing (live) | 2017.7.26 | Mandarin | Track: 1. Shadow(live) (夜神仙); 2. Gold Unfold (live) (肿胀); 3. Another Run (live) (新一轮); 4. Ocean Keeper (live)(海洋管理); 5. Secret Door (live) (消息); 6. Place of Empty (live) (有); 7. Penglai (live) (蓬莱) |
| 4 | Wan(玩) | 2018.7.26 | Mandarin | Track: 1. Qing Yuan(青原); 2. Kong Wu(空舞); 3. Wang Chuan(望穿); 4. Qing Jing Ju(情景剧); 5. Du Xing Xia(独行侠); 6. A(啊); 7. Ba Jie Mu(八节木); 8. Wo Men Cun Zai Yi Cha Na De Xi Huan(我们存在一刹那的喜欢); 9. Lang Wei Xian Di(浪味仙地); 10. You Ci Shan(有此山) |
| 5 | Hui You(洄游) | 2019.7.26 | Mandarin | Track: 1. You Wu Lai(有雾来); 2. Di Qi Ri(第七日); 3. Shan Shui Ren Wu(山水人物); 4. Lan(蓝); 5. Mei Li Hai(美丽海); 6. Ai Wan Bu Wan(爱完不完); 7. Fei Bai(飞白); 8. Xia Shi Ji Jian(下世纪见); 9. Chao Ren Zhen Xi Xi(超认真嬉戏); 10. Su Ri Zhi Si(素日之死); 11. Qun Ju Sheng Wu(群居生物); 12. Fan Ling(泛灵) |

=== Singles ===
| Release date | Title |
|---|---|
| 2015.7 | Yuan Chen(远辰) |
| 2015.12 | Ai Ruo(爱若) |
| 2016.3.8 | Huan Qi Yi(幻期颐) (released under the name of Lili(粒粒) which is another name of Chen Li) |
| 2016 | Yin Xing Shou(隐形兽) (released under the name of Lili(粒粒)) |
| 2016.10 | Number 38 Da Di Qu(38号大迪曲) [the promotional song of the movie Wai Gong Fang Ling 38 (外公芳龄38);with Good Sister Band(好妹妹乐队)] |
| 2016.11 | Dang Wo Zai Zhe Li(当我在这里) [the theme song of the documentary Masters in the Forbidden City(我在故宫修文物)] |
| 2016.12.19 | Zhou You(周游) |
| 2017.2.22 | Xi Tai(戏台) |
| 2017.3.7 | Hao Zai(好在) [the ending song of the Web Drama "Solaso Bistro"(问题餐厅)] |
| 2017.3.28 | Qing Zhu(庆祝) |
| 2017.12.20 | Happy New Year(新年快乐) [with Good Sister Band(好妹妹乐队) and Jiao Maiqi(焦迈奇)] |
| 2018.1.8 | Yan Shan Tu(研山图) |
| 2018.3.24 | Hua Kai(花开) |
| 2018.9.12 | Cong Tou(从头) |
| 2018.11.27 | Best Better Ever (the theme song of Cosmos Fashion Show) |
| 2019.1.1 | Zhi Ji Jin Zhao Xiao(只记今朝笑) [with Good Sister Band(好妹妹乐队), Jiao Maiqi(焦迈奇), Lili(粒粒), and Wang Jiayi(王加一)] |
| 2019.1.20 | Si Hai(四海) [the theme song of Alipay Wufu movie Qi Li Di(七里地)] |
| 2019.3.27 | Wu Suo Qiu Bi Man Zai Gui(无所求必满载归) |
| 2019.5.6 | Yuan Xing De Hai(圆形的海) [the Chinese promotion song of the movie Penguin Highway(企鹅公路)] |
| 2019.5.23 | Duo Duo Liu Yi(多多流意) [the theme song of the documentary It's Bread, It's Air, It's a Miracle(是面包，是空气，是奇迹啊)] |
| 2019.7.22 | Shi Jian Dou Zhi Dao(时间都知道) [the theme song of the TV drama See U Again(时间都知道)] |
| 2020.1.1 | Xiang Qin Xiang Ai(相亲相爱) [with Good Sister Band(好妹妹乐队), Qin Hao(秦昊), Zhang Xiaohou(张小厚), Jiao Maiqi(焦迈奇), Lili(粒粒), Wang Jiayi(王加一), and Chen Jingfei(陈婧霏)] |
| 2020.4.17 | Bao Qian Bao Qian(抱歉抱歉) [I'm CZR(我是唱作人) Season2 Episode1 Live] |
| 2020.4.20 | Kong Kong(空空) [I'm CZR(我是唱作人) Season2 Episode2 Live] |
| 2020.4.30 | Zi Ran Huan Jing(自然环境) [I'm CZR(我是唱作人) Season2 Episode3 Live] |
| 2020.5.8 | Ju Lie(剧烈) [I'm CZR(我是唱作人) Season2 Episode4 Live] |
| 2020.5.15 | Zou Shi(走失) [I'm CZR(我是唱作人) Season2 Episode5 Live] |
| 2020.5.22 | Yuan You(远游) [I'm CZR(我是唱作人) Season2 Episode6 Live] |
| 2020.5.29 | Qie Man(且慢) [I'm CZR(我是唱作人) Season2 Episode7 Live] |
| 2020.6.5 | Qing Tou(清透) [I'm CZR(我是唱作人) Season2 Episode8 Live] |
| 2020.6.26 | Bye-bye(拜拜) [I'm CZR(我是唱作人) Season2 Episode11 Live] |
| 2020.7.26 | Shi Jie Zheng Zhong(世界正中) |
| 2020.10.12 | Duan Ge(短歌) [the theme song of the Ye Jiaying(叶嘉莹) Literary Documentary Moon In Hand(掬水月在手)] |
| 2020.10.15 | Hippo(河马) |
| 2020.12.31 | Man Man Ren Sheng Lu [with Good Sister Band(好妹妹乐队), Qin Hao(秦昊), Zhang Xiaohou(张小厚), Lili(粒粒), Jiao Maiqi(焦迈奇), Wang Jiayi(王加一), Chen Jingfei(陈婧霏), David Wu(吴大卫), Lin Guimin(林贵敏), Wu Jingbin(伍敬彬), and Cai Decai(蔡得才)] |
| 2025.07.09 | Jin Lai Ke Hao(近来可好) [with Richie Jen(任贤齐)] |

== Awards and nominations ==
| Date | Ceremony | Award | Work | Result |
|---|---|---|---|---|
| 2014 | Abilu Music Awards 2014 | Song Of The Year(folk) | Qi Miao Neng Li Ge(奇妙能力歌) | Nominated |
| 2016.1.21 | Abilu Music Awards 2015 | Favorite Folk Musician | / | Won |
| 2016.1.21 | Abilu Music Awards 2015 | Favorite Folk Album | Ru Ye(如也) | Won |
| 2016.1.21 | Abilu Music Awards 2015 | Favorite Folk Song | Qi Miao Neng Li Ge(奇妙能力歌) | Won |
| 2016.4.9 | LiveMusic2016 | New Original Artist | / | Won |
| 2016.4.16 | Chinese Music Awards | Best Female New Artist Of The Year | / | Nominated |
| 2016.9.27 | FreshAsia Music | Best New Musician Of The Year | / | Won |
| 2016.12.28 | Tencent Entertainment White Paper | Outstanding Artist Of The Year | / | Won |
| 2017.8.11 | Chinese Music Media Awards 2017 | Most Popular Female Singer Of The Year | / | Nominated |
| 2017.8.11 | Chinese Music Media Awards 2017 | Most Popular Artist Of The Year | / | Nominated |
| 2017.12.16 | Miguhui Music Festival 2017 | Favorite Original Musician Of The Year | / | Won |
| 2017.12.18 | Cosmos Fashion Show 2017 | Most Beautiful People Of The Year | / | Won |
