= Li Suwen =

Chinese politician (1933–2022)

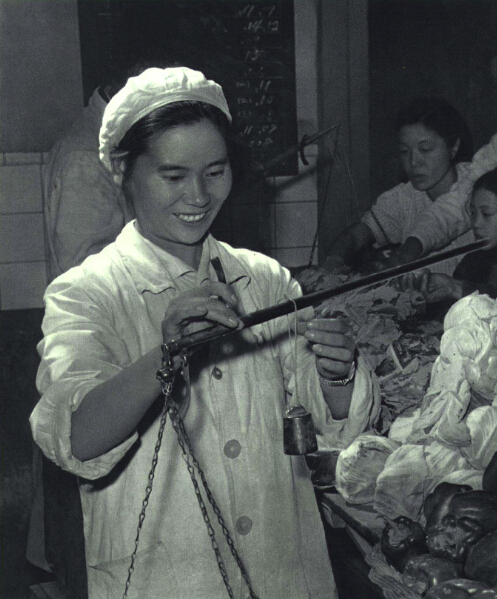
Li Suwen (1966)

Li Suwen (Chinese: 李素文; 1933 – 4 April 2022) was a Chinese politician who served as the vice chairperson of the Standing Committee of the National People's Congress. She rose in the ranks quickly during the Great Proletarian Revolution, from below the township level to a national leadership position in only seven years.
