= Hua Guofeng =

Leader of China from 1976 to 1978

- 华国锋
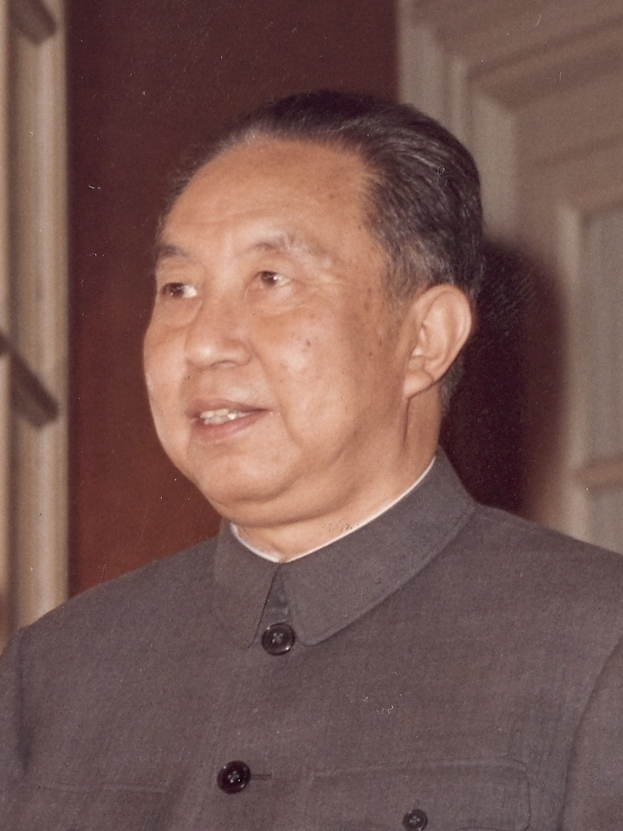
- Hua in 1979

Chairman of the Chinese Communist Party
- In office 7 October 1976 – 28 June 1981
- Deputy: Ye Jianying
- Preceded by: Mao Zedong
- Succeeded by: Hu Yaobang

Chairman of the Central Military Commission
- In office 7 October 1976 – 28 June 1981
- Preceded by: Mao Zedong
- Succeeded by: Deng Xiaoping

Premier of China
- In office 4 February 1976 – 10 September 1980
- Vice Premier: Deng Xiaoping
- Head of State: Soong Ching-ling; Ye Jianying
- Preceded by: Zhou Enlai
- Succeeded by: Zhao Ziyang

Vice Chairman of the Chinese Communist Party
- In office 28 June 1981 – 12 September 1982
- Chairman: Hu Yaobang
- In office 6 April 1976 – 6 October 1976
- Chairman: Mao Zedong
- Preceded by: Zhou Enlai
- Succeeded by: Ye Jianying

Personal details
- Born: Su Zhu; 16 February 1921 Jiaocheng County, Shanxi Province, Republic of China
- Died: 20 August 2008 (aged 87) Beijing, People's Republic of China
- Party: Chinese Communist Party (1938–2008)
- Spouse: Han Zhijun (m. 1949)
- Children: 4

Chinese name
- Simplified Chinese: 华国锋
- Traditional Chinese: 華國鋒
Transcriptions
Standard Mandarin
- Hanyu Pinyin: Huà Guófēng
- Wade–Giles: Hua^{4} Kuo^{2}-feng^{1}
- IPA: [xwâ kwǒ.fə́ŋ]
Yue: Cantonese
- Jyutping: Waa^{6} Gwok^{3}-fung^{1}
- IPA: [wa˩ kʷɔk̚˧.fʊŋ˥]
Southern Min
- Hokkien POJ: Hua Kok-hong

Su Zhu
- Simplified Chinese: 苏铸
- Traditional Chinese: 蘇鑄
Transcriptions
Standard Mandarin
- Hanyu Pinyin: Sū Zhù
- Central institution membership: 1976–1982: Member, 10th, 11th Politburo; 1969–2002: Member, 9th, 10th, 11th, 12th, 13th, 14th, 15th Central Committee; Other offices held: 1981–1982: Vice Chairman, CCP; 1977–1980: President, Central Party School; 1976: First Vice Chairman, CCP; 1975–1977: Minister, Public Security; 1970–1976: Secretary, Hunan Party Committee; 1970–1976: Chairman, Hunan Revolutionary Committee; Paramount Leader of the People's Republic of China: ← Mao Zedong; Deng Xiaoping →

Hua Guofeng (Note: /hwɑː/; 华国锋) (born Su Zhu (苏铸); 16 February 1921 – 20 August 2008; also spelled as Hua Kuo-feng) was a Chinese politician who served as chairman of the Chinese Communist Party and the premier of China. As the successor of Mao Zedong, Hua held the top offices of the government, party, and the military after the deaths of Mao and Premier Zhou Enlai, but was gradually forced out of power between December 1978 and June 1981, and subsequently retreated from the political limelight, though still remaining a member of the Central Committee until 2002.

Born and raised in Jiaocheng, Hua joined the Chinese Communist Party (CCP) in 1938, seeing action in both the Second Sino–Japanese War and the Chinese Civil War as a guerrilla fighter. In 1948, he was appointed party secretary of Xiangtan in Hunan, which included Mao's birthplace of Shaoshan. A popular local administrator, Hua rose to become Hunan's party secretary during the Cultural Revolution, and was elevated to the national stage in the early 1970s, notably assuming control of the Ministry of Public Security in 1973 and vice premier in 1975. After the death of Zhou Enlai in January 1976, Mao elevated Hua to the positions of premier and first vice chairman of the CCP, which made him Mao's designated successor.

In October 1976, a month after Mao's death, Hua arrested and removed the Gang of Four from power with the assistance of Mao's security chief Wang Dongxing, who became one of Hua's key supporters along with vice premier and chief economic planner Li Xiannian, and Luo Qingchang, head of the intelligence services. Hua also succeeded Mao as party chairman and chairman of the Central Military Commission, becoming the first to simultaneously hold the offices of party leader, premier, and commander-in-chief, as well as the only paramount leader to hold the office of premier.

While Hua ended the Cultural Revolution's most notorious policies, such as the constant ideological campaigns, he remained generally committed to a command economy and the continuation of the Maoist line. Between December 1978 and June 1981, Deng Xiaoping and his supporters forced Hua from his position of paramount leader but allowed him to retain some titles. Hua gradually faded into political obscurity, but continued to insist on the correctness of Maoist principles.

== Early life ==
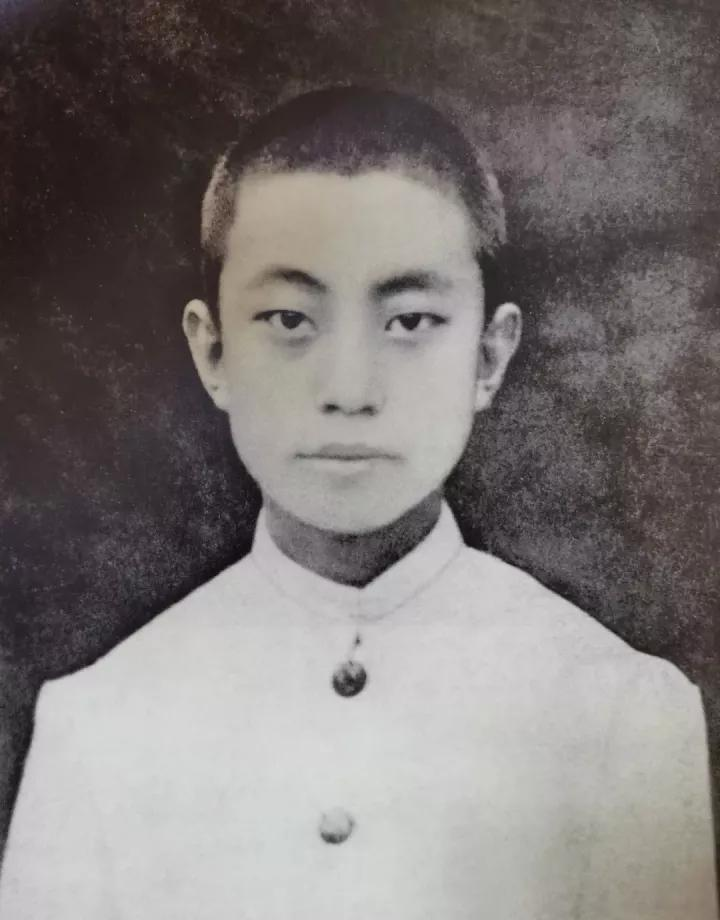
Hua Guofeng in 1935

Born in Jiaocheng, Shanxi, the fourth son of a family originally from Fan County, Henan, Hua lost his father at the age of seven. He studied at the Jiaocheng County Commercial School and joined the CCP in 1938, during the Second Sino–Japanese War. Like many Communists of the era who took on revolutionary names, he changed his name to Huá Guófēng as an abbreviation of "中華抗日救國先鋒隊" (Zhōnghuá kàngrì jiùguó xiānfēng duì; 'Chinese Anti-Japanese Aggression National Salvation Vanguard'). After having served as a soldier in the 8th Route Army for 12 years under the command of Marshal Zhu De, he was appointed propaganda chief for the Jiaocheng County Party Committee in 1947, during the Chinese Civil War.

Hua moved with the victorious PLA to Hunan in 1948, where he married Han Zhijun, and would remain in that province until 1971. He was appointed Party Secretary for Xiangyin County in August 1949, just before the establishment of the People's Republic of China in October of that year. In 1952, he was appointed secretary of Xiangtan Special District, which included Mao's hometown, Shaoshan. In this role, he built a memorial hall dedicated to Mao. When Mao visited the site, in June 1959, he was favorably impressed. Mao Zedong first met Hua in 1955, and was impressed by his simplicity.

Because the Governor of Hunan, General Cheng Qian, was not a communist (he belonged to the Revolutionary Committee of the Chinese Kuomintang, a left-wing nationalist faction of the KMT that collaborated with the CCP), Hua gradually came to exercise more and more power within the province, being named Vice Governor in 1958.

Hua participated in the 1959 Lushan Conference (an enlarged plenary session of the CCP Central Committee) as a member of the Hunan Provincial Party delegation, and wrote two investigative reports fully defending all of Mao's policies. Hua's influence increased with the Cultural Revolution, as he supported it and led the movement in Hunan. He organized the preparation for the establishment of the local Revolutionary Committee in 1967, of which he was a deputy chairman. In December 1970, he was elected Chairman of the Revolutionary Committee as well as First Secretary of the CCP Hunan Committee.

He was elected a full member of the 9th Central Committee in 1969.

== At the center of power ==
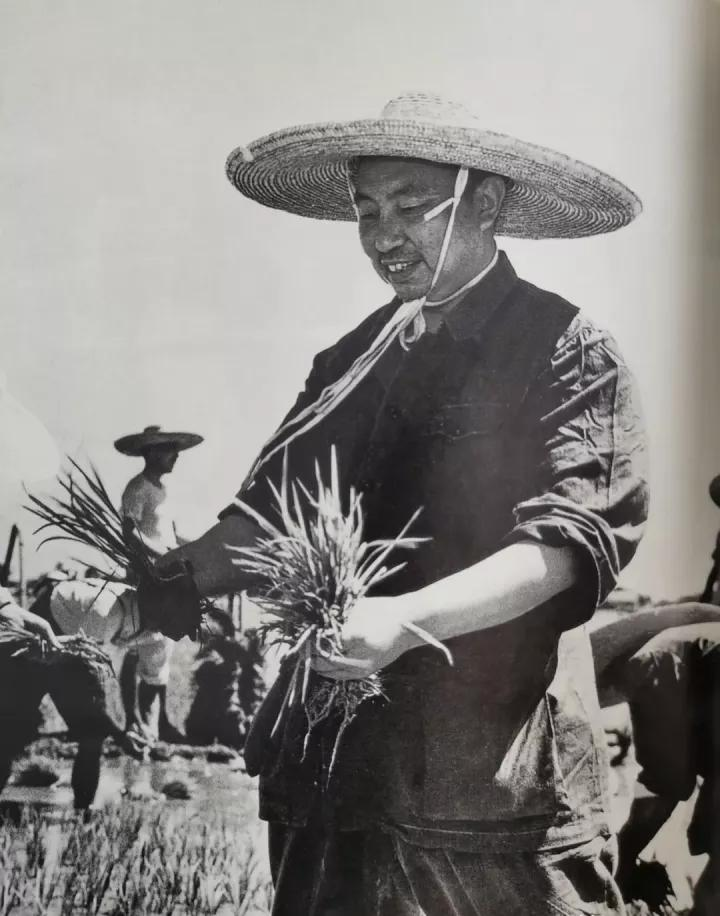
In July 1970, Hua Guofeng participated in the agriculture of the Dongtundu Subdistrict in the suburbs of Changsha.

Hua was called to Beijing to direct Zhou Enlai's State Council staff office in 1971, but only stayed for a few months before returning to his previous post in Hunan. Later that year, he was appointed as the most junior of the seven-member committee investigating the Lin Biao Affair, a sign of the strong trust Mao had in him. Hua was re-elected as a full member of the 10th Central Committee in 1973 and elevated to membership in the Politburo; in the same year, he was put in charge of agricultural development by Zhou Enlai.

In 1973, Mao named Hua Minister of Public Security and Vice Premier, thus giving him control of police and security forces. Hua's rising influence was confirmed by his being chosen to deliver a speech on modernizing agriculture in October of that year, which echoed the views of Zhou Enlai.

Zhou Enlai died on 8 January 1976, at a time when Deng Xiaoping's reformist alliance was not yet strong enough to stand up to both the ailing Mao Zedong and his Cultural Revolution allies, the Gang of Four (Jiang Qing, Zhang Chunqiao, Wang Hongwen, and Yao Wenyuan). A week after reading the late premier's eulogy, Deng left Beijing along with several close allies for the relative safety of Guangzhou.

Although Mao Zedong had reportedly wanted to appoint Zhang Chunqiao as Zhou Enlai's successor, he ended up naming Hua as acting Premier, who was appointed without authorization from the National People's Congress. At the same time, the media controlled by the Gang of Four began denouncing Deng once again (he had been purged during the Cultural Revolution, and was only returned to power in 1973). Popular affection for Zhou was underestimated, however, leading to the Tiananmen Incident, a confrontation between the radicals' militia allies and Beijing citizens seeking to honor Zhou during the traditional Qingming festival. At the same time, Hua delivered speeches on the "official line for criticizing Deng Xiaoping", which were approved by Mao and the Party Central Committee.

During the Tiananmen Incident of 1976, thousands of people protested at the militia's removal of wreaths honoring Zhou in front of the Monument to the People's Heroes. Vehicles were burned, offices ransacked and there were reports of many injuries and deaths. In the aftermath, Deng Xiaoping was blamed for inciting the protests and stripped of all his party and government posts, though his party membership was retained at Mao's behest. Shortly thereafter, Hua was elevated to First Vice Chairman of the CCP Central Committee and Premier of the State Council.

Following the 1976 Tangshan earthquake in July, Hua visited the devastated area and helped direct relief efforts there, while the Gang of Four was absent.

== Removing the Gang of Four ==
Mao died on 9 September 1976 and Hua, as both the second highest-ranking member of the CCP and premier, led the national commemorations in Beijing in his honor in the days that followed, and was the keynote speaker during the national memorial observance in the capital's Tiananmen Square. At the time, the highest power organ of the country, the Politburo Standing Committee, consisted of Hua, Marshal Ye Jianying, Zhang Chunqiao, and Wang Hongwen; Ye was in semi-retirement, and Zhang and Wang were part of the Gang of Four.

Hua knew that in the post-Mao power vacuum, his position vis-a-vis the Gang of Four's would be a zero-sum game. That is, if the Gang of Four were not removed through use of force, the Gang might attempt to oust him pre-emptively. Hua made contact with Ye days after Mao's death to discuss plans about the Gang of Four. Ye had grown disillusioned with the Gang before Mao's death, so he and Hua came to a quick agreement to act against the Gang.

Hua crucially enjoyed the support of Mao's loyal security chief, Wang Dongxing, who had command of the elite 8341 Special Regiment, as well as other leading figures on the Politburo, including Vice Premier Li Xiannian and General Chen Xilian, Commander of the Beijing Military Region, as well as Luo Qingchang, chief of the intelligence services. The group discussed ways to remove the Gang, including holding a Politburo or Central Committee meeting to oust them through established party procedure, but the idea was shot down because the Central Committee was, at the time, composed of many of the Gang's supporters. Eventually, the group decided to use force.

The members of the Gang were arrested on 6 October, soon after midnight. Hua had summoned Zhang Chunqiao, Wang Hongwen, and Yao Wenyuan to a meeting at Zhongnanhai, ostensibly to discuss the fifth volume of Mao's "Selected Works". They were arrested while walking into the meeting at Huairen Hall. According to Hua's own recollection of events, he and Marshal Ye Jianying were the only two leaders present at the "meeting", awaiting the arrival of the members of the Gang. Upon the arrest of each of the three, Hua personally announced to them the reasons for their detention. Hua said that they had engaged in "anti-party and anti-socialist" acts and "conspired to usurp power". Jiang Qing and Mao Yuanxin were arrested at their respective residences.

A task force led by Geng Biao occupied the headquarters of the party's main propaganda organs, which were considered a part of the Gang's turf at the time. Another group was dispatched to stabilize Shanghai, the Gang's main regional power base. At an emergency Politburo meeting the next day, Hua Guofeng was appointed as chairman of the CCP and the chairman of the Central Military Commission (CMC), the governing body of People's Liberation Army (PLA). Hua's accession to the top leadership was legitimized by a quote from Mao saying "With you in charge, I am at ease", published afterwards of the purge of the Gang, used as an evidence of Mao's "boundless trust" on Hua. The PLA had been critical to Hua's appointment.

== Party Chairman and Premier ==
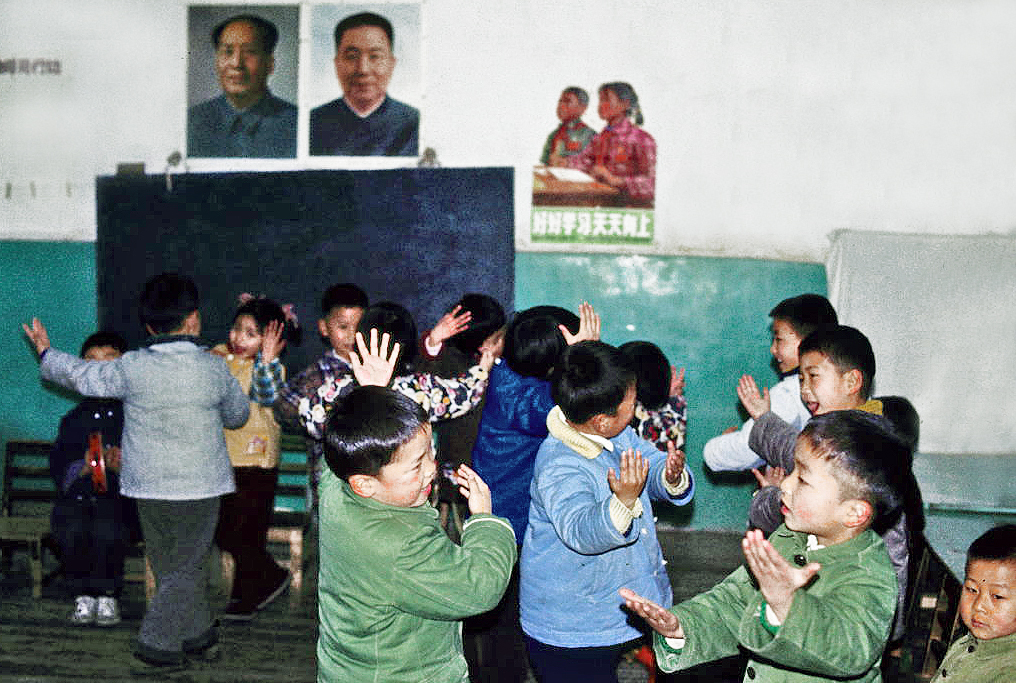
In 1978, the classroom of a kindergarten in Shanghai in which is displayed portraits of then-Chairman Hua Guofeng and former Chairman Mao Zedong

Following the ouster of the Gang of Four a new ruling triumvirate was established consisting of Hua, Marshal Ye Jianying, and chief economic planner Li Xiannian. The Cultural Revolution had ended, although Hua did not repudiate Mao and attributed all of the failures of the Cultural Revolution solely to the Gang of Four.

Almost immediately, a new power struggle began between Hua and Deng Xiaoping. This struggle was decisively resolved in Deng's favor in December 1978, which is generally taken as the start of the reform and opening up.

=== Domestic politics ===
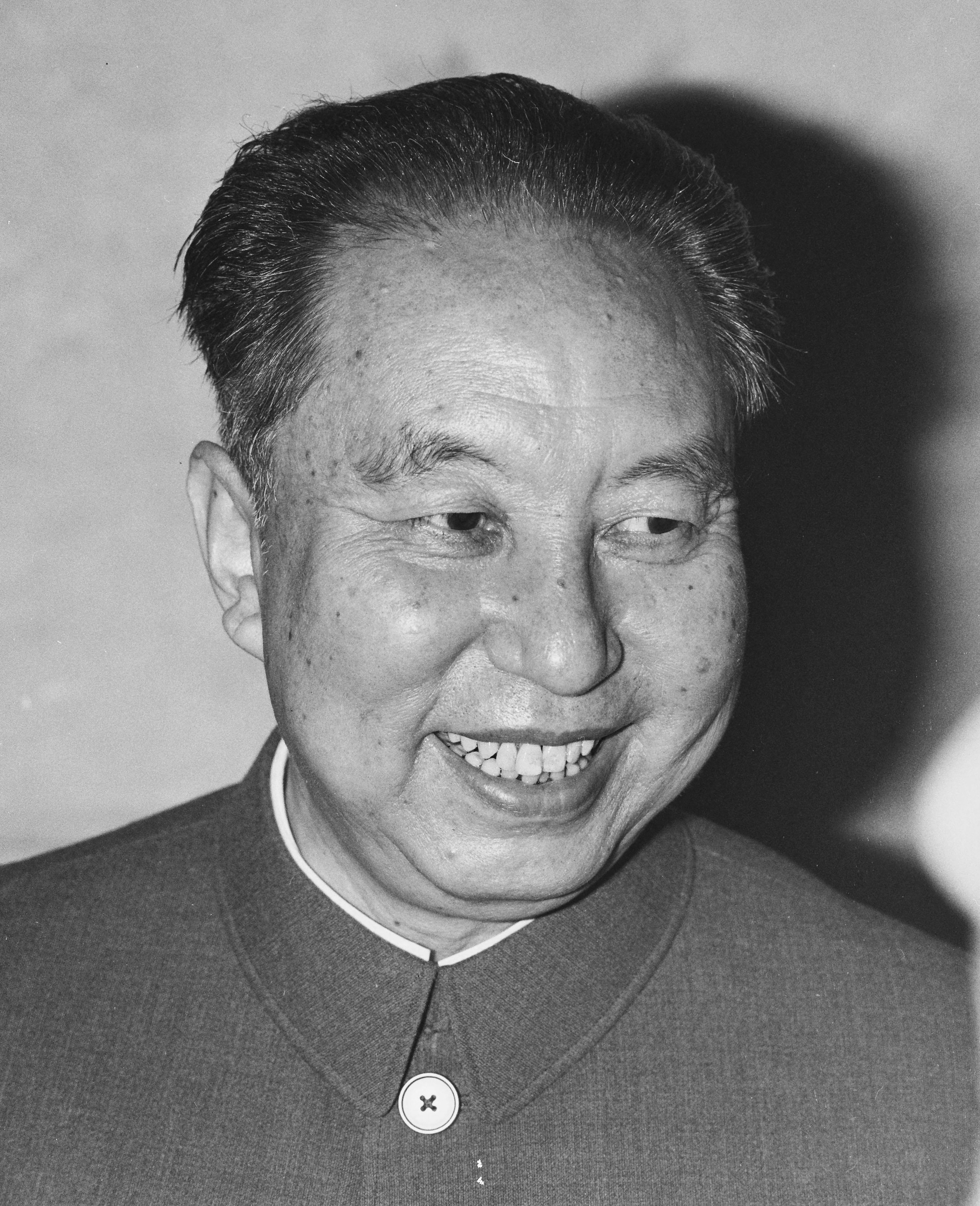
Hua in 1979

Hua was not broadly known to the Chinese public at the time of his appointment.

Starting in late 1976, Hua started a nationwide campaign to criticize the Gang of Four, together with a process of "reversing the verdicts" for people who criticized the Gang. People punished after the 1976 Tiananmen incident were released, and the incident was re-assessed during a Central Work Conference held in 1977. From October 1976 to December 1978, more than 4600 cadres disgraced during the Cultural Revolution were rehabilitated.

In July 1977, at the 1st Plenary Session of the 11th Central Committee, Deng was rehabilitated with the approval of Hua. The Plenum also marked a large change in the Central Committee's composition, with 68 newly elected members, of which more than 20 were rehabilitated officials. Despite his wishes to be cremated, Mao's body was also placed in a mausoleum, while Hua was in charge of editing the fifth volume of Selected Works of Mao Zedong, later subject to significant propaganda efforts.

In February 1977, the central leadership under Hua released a new slogan: "We will resolutely uphold whatever policy decisions Chairman Mao made, and unswervingly follow whatever instructions Chairman Mao gave". Satirically referred to as the "Two Whatevers", this slogan was used to criticize Hua due to the perception that he obeyed Mao's orders too blindly.

In 1977 the leadership authorized the first National College Entrance Examination since the Cultural Revolution began.

Hua also attempted reforming state protocol as a method of elevating his prestige. In 1978 all party meetings were to hang portraits of Mao and Hua side-by-side, including at the National People's Congress and CCP Party Congress meetings. All schools were required to hang Hua's picture next to Mao's. Hua also changed the Chinese national anthem to incorporate Mao Zedong and the Chinese Communist Party, switching the tone from being war-rallying to purely Communist ideology; these lyrics were eventually rejected. Hua Guofeng continued to use the terminology of the Cultural Revolution, but he criticized certain aspects of it, including the education reform, the revolutionary committees' activity and other excesses, blaming the Gang of Four. State media referred to him as "the wise leader".

In February 1978, the first session of the 5th National People's Congress approved a new state constitution, which Hua was heavily involved in drafting. This document attempted to restore some rule of law and planning mechanisms from the PRC's original 1956 constitution, though it still contained references to continuous revolution and proletarian internationalism; it was replaced only four years later with a different constitution.

Hua sought to invigorate China's science and technology institutions, which the Cultural Revolution had disrupted. In March 1978, he convened a national science conference.

=== Economy ===
During his tenure, Hua was concerned at the state of China's economy, stating that he feared it was on the brink of collapse. Hua worked with Li Xiannian to boost the economy, endorsing a plan to accelerate economic growth by boosting enterprises budgets and importing massive amounts of foreign technology. He introduced an ambitious ten-year economic plan which sought to create a Soviet-style economy by increasing investments in heavy industry and energy, mechanizing agriculture and using imported technology to build new manufacturing plants. Starting from 1977, Hua also spoke about the "Four Modernizations". Though the idea of importing technology was not new, Hua's approach was differentiated by its scale, with planned imports of $80 billion by the summer of 1978.

His proposal to purchase foreign equipment, services, and infrastructure through massive loans, which were viewed as reckless, impractical, and later derided as "the Western-Led Leap Forward". Although his industrial proposals proved unrealistic, Hua's efforts removed the political stigma from the idea of importing technology. The technology import plans were quickly scrapped in favor of a cheaper and more doable five-year plan which prioritized light industry and consumer goods. Hua's economic and political programs involved the restoration of Soviet-style industrial planning and party control similar to that followed by China before the Great Leap Forward. However, this model was rejected by supporters of Deng Xiaoping, who argued for a more private-based economic system.

=== Foreign policy ===
In 1978, Hua visited Yugoslavia and Romania to study their socialist economic experiences and advanced production techniques.

In October 1979, Hua went on a European tour, the first of its kind for a Chinese leader after 1949. He traveled to West Germany and France. On 28 October Hua visited the United Kingdom and met with British Prime Minister Margaret Thatcher. The two engaged in friendly talks and discussed the future of Hong Kong, which was a British Overseas Territory at the time. Chairman Hua visited Derby's British Rail Railway Technical Centre to observe the development of the Advanced Passenger Train. His visit coincided with the donation of the Chinese Government Railways Steam Locomotive 4-8-4 KF Class No 7 to the National Railway Museum in York. Chairman Hua also went to a farm in Oxfordshire and visited Oxford University.

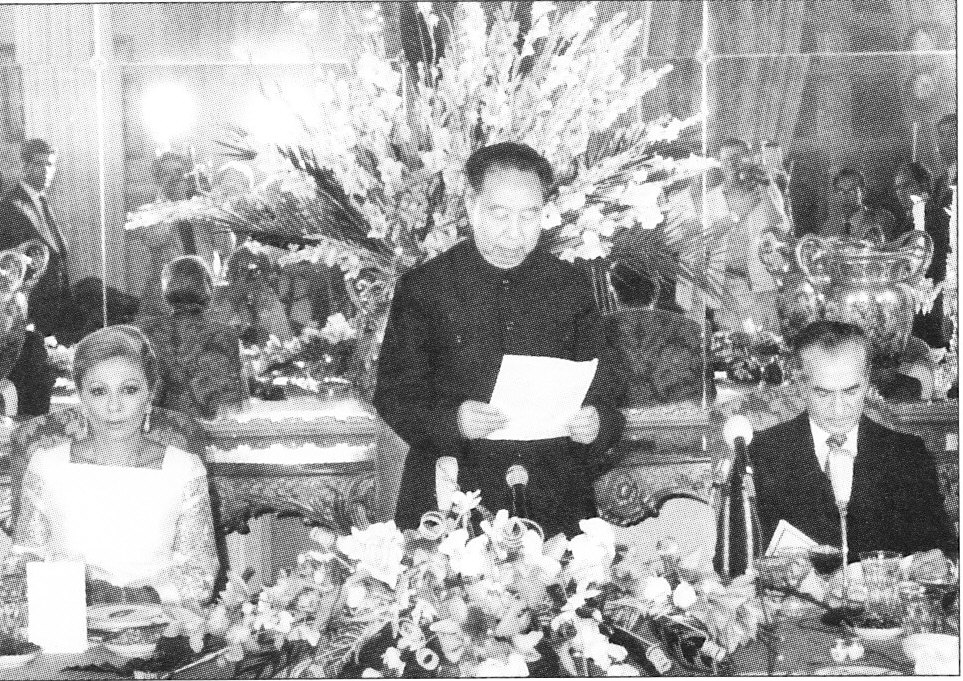
Hua Guofeng with Shah Mohammad Reza Pahlavi during a state visit in Iran, 1978

Hua was one of the last foreigners to visit Mohammad Reza Pahlavi, the Shah of Iran, before he was overthrown in 1979.

== Power struggle and ousting ==
Though Deng consistently supported Hua's policies, he later started to subtly criticize Hua, aiming to increase his own power. He was supported by Hu Yaobang, head of the CCP Organization Department starting from 1977, who criticized Hua as too dogmatic and contrasted him with Deng. This eventually led to the major editorial titled "Practice Is the Sole Criterion for Testing Truth", drafted by philosopher Hu Fuming and published in May 1978, which argued that significant errors were committed in CCP history because there was insufficient focus on "testing truth" through "practice". Though criticized by some Party members, the article was soon endorsed by Deng.

On 10 November, the Central Work Conference was held, in which Hua attempted to move away from the CCP's emphasis on class struggle towards economic and technological development. Though succeeding, he was reprimanded by elderly CCP members for not focusing enough on reckoning with the Cultural Revolution as well as the 1976 Tiananmen incident. Hua, encouraged by Ye Jianying and Party elders Chen Yun to accept the demands, gave a speech at the conference on 25 November, where he stated that the Tiananmen incident was an "entirely a revolutionary mass movement, and it is necessary to reevaluate it openly and thoroughly." Significantly boosting Deng, this led to posthumous rehabilitations as well as reinstating of leaders including Bo Yibo and Yang Shangkun. Many elderly Party members talked about their suffering during the Cultural Revolution, criticizing Hua for not clearly breaking with Maoism. Hua gave self-criticism on 13 September for siding too closely with Mao's positions.

Hua effectively lost power at the 3rd plenary session of the 11th Central Committee, after which Deng Xiaoping became the de facto leader of China with his idea for economic reform being adopted by the Party. He continued to hold some power, notably blocking additions critical of him to the "Historical Resolution" drafted by the CCP leadership to evaluate the Cultural Revolution. He was replaced as Premier by Zhao Ziyang in September 1980, while the Politburo issued a formal criticism of Hua in December, casting him as a figure that opposed modernization and sought simply to parrot Mao. This was further reinforced by the Historical Resolution adopted by the 6th plenary session of the 11th Central Committee on 27 June 1981, which said that Hua did too little to change things after Mao's death. It also stated that he had done good work by removing the Gang of Four, but afterwards, he committed "serious errors".

As Deng gradually gained control of the CCP, Hua was denounced for promoting the Two Whatevers policy. As early as January 1979, state media had stopped referring to him as "the wise leader" and he was replaced as Premier by Zhao Ziyang in September 1980, was replaced as Party Chairman by Hu Yaobang and was replaced as chairman of the Central Military Commission by Deng himself in 1981. Hua Guofeng was demoted to the position of junior Vice Chairman; and when this post was abolished in 1982, he continued to serve as an ordinary member of the Central Committee, a position which he held until the 16th Party Congress of November 2002, despite having passed the unofficial mandatory retirement age of 70 in 1991.

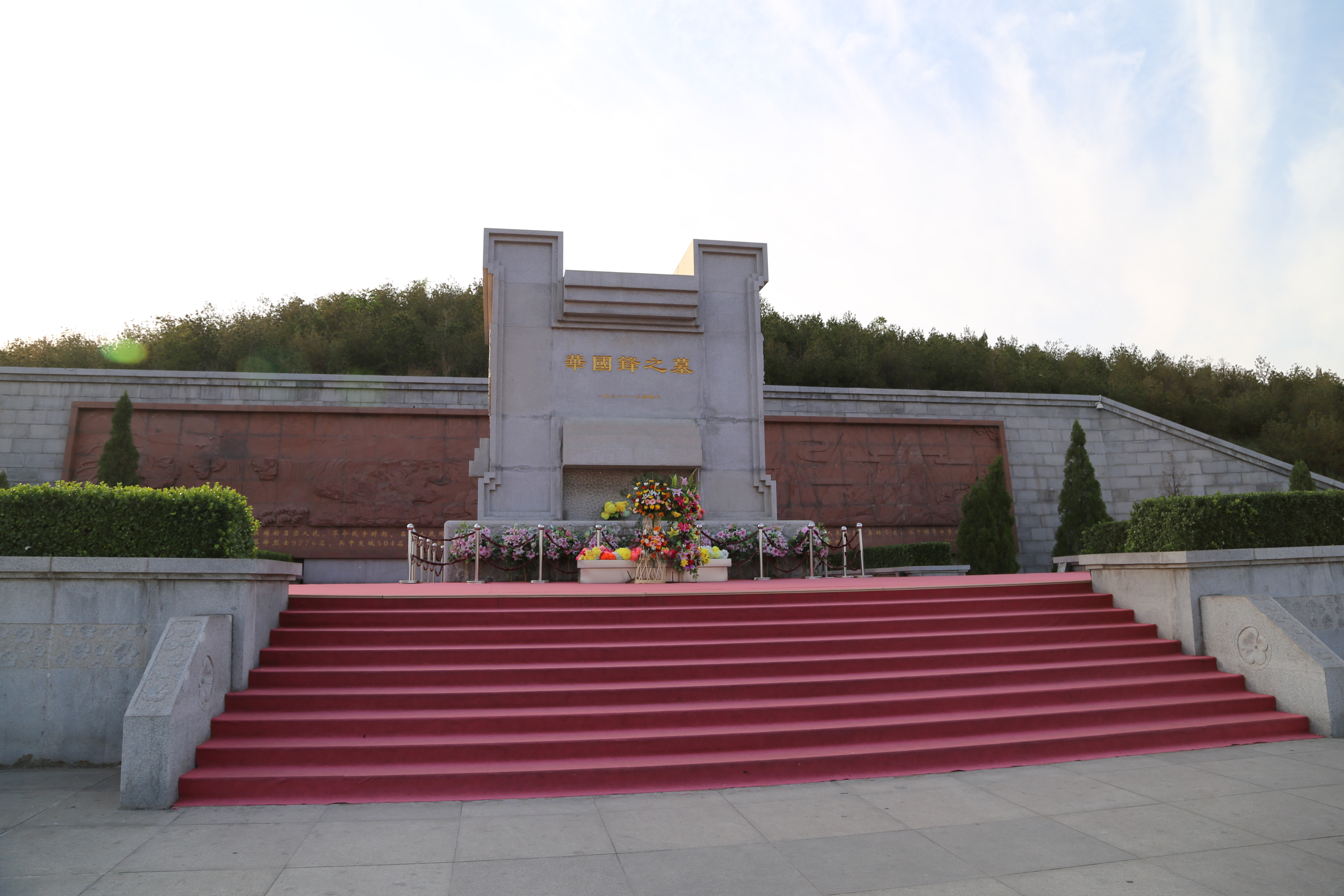
Tomb of Hua Guofeng at Jiaocheng County

== Retirement and death ==
After 16th Party Congress in November 2002, Hua officially lost his seat on the Central Committee of the CCP. It was reported that he voluntarily retired for age and health reasons, but that was not officially confirmed by the party. He was, however, invited to the 17th Party Congress in 2007 as a special delegate, and he appeared at a ceremony which was held in December 2007 in order to commemorate the 115th anniversary of Mao Zedong's birth. Despite his retention of formal party positions, Hua distanced himself from active participation in politics. His main hobby was grape cultivation, and he kept up with current affairs by subscribing to a host of newspapers.

Hua's health deteriorated in 2008, and he was hospitalized for kidney and heart complications. He died in Beijing on 20 August 2008. A cause of death was not given and, because his death occurred during the 2008 Summer Olympics in Beijing, it was not given much attention by state media. There was a 30-second broadcast on the national news program Xinwen Lianbo and a short paragraph in the corner of the front page of the People's Daily. His funeral, which was held at the Babaoshan Revolutionary Cemetery on 30 August, was attended by all the members of the Politburo Standing Committee, as well as former President Jiang Zemin and former Premier Zhu Rongji.

== Legacy ==
Hua's legacy is often reduced to the Two Whatevers: "uphold whatever policy decisions Chairman Mao made, and unswervingly follow whatever instructions Chairman Mao gave."

Economic historian Isabella Weber argues that Hua's upholding of the Two Whatevers policy is an overemphasized aspect of Hua's legacy. Weber argues that "Paying tribute to Mao in the year after his passing was hardly unique to Hua" and that the Two Whatevers slogan was also upheld by Chen Yun, who along with Deng Xiaoping superseded Hua. Academic Andrew B. Kennedy writes that despite Hua's association with the Two Whatevers, "Hua was essentially a pragmatic problem solver".

Hua's break with Cultural Revolution era economic policies were consistent with the 1975 reform agenda of Deng. Hua made national economic development a matter of the highest priority and emphasized the need to achieve "liberation of productive forces". He "combined Soviet-style big push industrialization with an opening up to the capitalist world" and under his leadership, China opened its first Special Economic Zone and launched major efforts to attract foreign direct investment. Hua encouraged a local economy policy that included both planned elements and limited market freedom of the sort that Mao had previously derided as economism. Additionally, Hua also encouraged free debates within the CCP, which aimed to promote a more reformist form of Maoism. His political and economic reforms contributed to the early de facto de-Maoification in China, therefore paved the way for the reform and opening up led by Deng.

Hua removed the controls that the Gang of Four had established over cultural and educational policy. The relaxation of controls over cultural content resulted in a transition from revolutionary art to more market-oriented and individualist works like scar literature. Hua regained the loyalty of party cadre and intellectuals, who had generally been marginalized during the Cultural Revolution. This strengthened the party apparatus and contributed to national stability.

The ousting of Hua was significant in at least two respects. First, it demonstrated the unimportance of official titles in the Chinese Communist Party during the late 1970s and early 1980s. Despite being the official leader of the party, the state, and the army, Hua was unable to defeat a leadership challenge by Deng Xiaoping. Secondly, Hua's ousting reflected a change of policies which were initiated by Deng Xiaoping according to which disgraced party members would merely be stripped of their positions, they would not be jailed or physically harmed.

On 20 February 2021, a symposium to commemorate the 100th birth anniversary of Hua was held, attended by Politburo Standing Committee members Wang Huning and Han Zheng. Wang gave a speech, where he said:

We commemorate Comrade Hua Guofeng to learn his political character of being firm and loyal to the Party, his deep conviction of sticking to his original mission and caring for the people, his fine style of being practical and realistic, and his noble quality of being open and honest and self-disciplined. In the new journey of building a modern socialist country, we must adhere to Xi Jinping Thought of Socialism with Chinese Characteristics for a New Era as a guide…unite closely around the Party Central Committee with Comrade Xi Jinping at the core, overcome difficulties, pioneer and innovate, dare to fight and be good at fighting, and strive to create new performance worthy of the times, the people and our forefathers, so as to celebrate the 100th anniversary of the founding of the CCP with outstanding achievements.

== Family ==
Hua married Han Zhijun in January 1949. They had four children, all of whom are surnamed "Su" (苏), in accordance with Hua's birth name. Their first son, Su Hua, is a retired Air Force officer. Their second son, Su Bin, is a retired army officer. Their older daughter, Su Ling, is a party and union official at the Civil Aviation Administration of China. Their younger daughter, Su Li, works for the State Council.

== See also ==
- Hua Guofeng's cult of personality
- Politics of China
- History of the People's Republic of China (1976–89)
- History of the Chinese Communist Party

== Notes ==
Military offices
Preceded by Bu Zhanya	Political commissar of the PLA Hunan Military District; 1971–1977	Succeeded by Mao Zhiyong
Party political offices
Chinese Communist Party
Preceded by Wang Yanchun; Vacant since 1967	Secretary of the CCP Hunan Committee; 1970–1976	Succeeded by Mao Zhiyong; Vacant until 1977
Preceded by Zhou Enlai; Wang Hongwen; Ye Jianying; Deng Xiaoping	First Vice Chairman of the Chinese Communist Party; 1976	Succeeded by Ye Jianying
Preceded by Mao Zedong	Chairman of the Chinese Communist Party; 1976–1981	Succeeded by Hu Yaobang
Preceded by Mao Zedong	Chairman of the Central Military Commission; 1976–1981	Succeeded by Deng Xiaoping
Preceded by Lin Feng; Abolished since 1966	President of the Central Party School; 1977–1982	Succeeded by Wang Zhen
Preceded by Hu Yaobang; Li Xiannian; Ye Jianying; Deng Xiaoping; Chen Yun; Wang Dongxing	Vice Chairman of the Chinese Communist Party; Served alongside: Li Xiannian, Ye Jianying, Deng Xiaoping, Chen Yun, Wang Dongxing, Zhao Ziyang; 1981–1982	Post abolished
Political offices
People's Republic of China
Preceded by Li Yuan	Chairman of the Hunan Revolutionary Committee; 1970–1976	Succeeded by Mao Zhiyong; Vacant until 1977
Preceded by Li Zhen	Minister of Public Security; 1973–1977	Succeeded by Zhao Cangbi
Preceded by Zhou Enlai	Premier of China; Acting from 4 February to 7 April 1976; 1976–1980	Succeeded by Zhao Ziyang
