= Zhang Tixue =

Chinese politician

Zhang Tixue (Chinese: 张体学) (1915–1973, born Zhang Tizhao) (Chinese: 张体照) was a Chinese politician. He was born in Xin County, Henan Province. He was Chinese Communist Party Committee Secretary and Governor of Hubei (1956).

Preceded by Liu Zihou	Governor of Hubei; 1956	Succeeded by Zeng Siyu
