= Li Zhen (Minister of Public Security) =

Chinese general and official (1914–1973)

- 李震
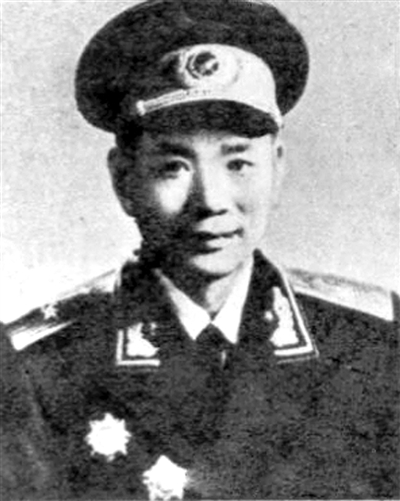

Minister of Public Security
- In office 22 June 1970 – 21 October 1973
- Premier: Zhou Enlai
- Preceded by: Xie Fuzhi
- Succeeded by: Hua Guofeng

Personal details
- Born: December 1914 Gaocheng, Hebei, China
- Died: October 22, 1973 (aged 58)
- Party: Chinese Communist Party

Li Zhen (Chinese: 李震; pinyin: Lǐ Zhèn; December 1914 – October 22, 1973) was a military general and government official of the People's Republic of China.

== Biography ==
Li Zhen was born in Gaocheng, Hebei in 1914. He graduated from Tsinghua University with a degree in journalism. He joined the Chinese Communist Party in August 1937 and fought in the Second Sino-Japanese War and Chinese Civil War. He was awarded the rank of major general, in 1955.

During the Cultural Revolution, Li was promoted by his long-time superior, Xie Fuzhi. In September 1966, Li was appointed vice minister of the Ministry of Public Security, working closely with Xie.

He was promoted to Minister of Public Security in 1972, but committed suicide on October 22, 1973. The precise motive is unknown.

Government offices
Preceded by Xie Fuzhi	Minister of Public Security; 1972–1973	Succeeded by Hua Guofeng
