= 10th Central Committee of the Chinese Communist Party =

The 10th Central Committee of the Chinese Communist Party was in session from 1973 to 1977. It was preceded by the 9th Central Committee of the Chinese Communist Party. It held three plenary sessions in the four-year period. It was formally succeeded by the 11th Central Committee of the Chinese Communist Party.

It elected the 10th Politburo of the Chinese Communist Party in 1973.

194 individuals served as members and 124 as alternates in the 10th Central Committee.

== Chronology ==
1. 1st Plenary Session
  - Date: August 30, 1973
  - Location: Beijing
  - Significance: Mao Zedong was appointed Chairman of the CCP Central Committee, with Zhou Enlai, Wang Hongwen, Kang Sheng, Ye Jianying and Li Desheng as vice-chairmen. 25-member Politburo, 9-member Politburo Standing Committee and other central organs were elected.
2. 2nd Plenary Session
  - Date: January 8–10, 1975
  - Location: Beijing
  - Significance: The only point in agenda was the preparation of the 4th National People's Congress, which was to open on January 13. The 1975 Constitution of the People's Republic of China as well as reports and lists of nominees for top State posts to be submitted to the Congress were approved. Deng Xiaoping was elected vice-chairman and Standing Committee member, replacing Li Desheng who resigned and disappeared from the public eye until mid-1977.
3. 3rd Plenary Session
  - Date: July 16–21, 1977
  - Location: Beijing
  - Significance: Hua Guofeng was ratified as Chairman of the CCP Central Committee with the formal approval of the October 6, 1976 Politburo resolution. The Gang of Four was furtherly denounced and its members expelled from the Party. Deng Xiaoping was restored to all his posts after the Politburo had removed him from the core leadership in April 1976. The decision to convene the Party's 11th National Congress ahead of schedule was taken.
