= 9th Central Committee of the Chinese Communist Party =

The 9th Central Committee of the Chinese Communist Party was in session from 1969 to 1973. It was preceded by the 8th Central Committee of the Chinese Communist Party. It was the second central committee in session during the Chinese Cultural Revolution. Even amidst partial cultural disintegration, it was succeeded by the 10th Central Committee of the Chinese Communist Party. It held two plenary sessions in the 4-year period.

It elected the 9th Politburo of the Chinese Communist Party in 1969.

170 individuals served as members and 109 as alternates in the 9th Central Committee.

== Chronology ==
1. 1st Plenary Session
  - Date: April 28, 1969
  - Location: Beijing
  - Significance: Mao Zedong and Lin Biao were respectively appointed chairman and vice-chairman of the CCP Central Committee. 25-member Politburo, 5-member Politburo Standing Committee and other central organs were elected. Mao Zedong made a speech emphasizing the need to unite after the early turbulent years of the Cultural Revolution.
2. 2nd Plenary Session
  - Date: August 23–September 6, 1970
  - Location: Lushan
  - Significance: The necessity to establish new Party committees after they were disbanded at the beginning of the Cultural Revolution was pointed out. It was decided to convene the 4th National People's Congress "at an appropriate time". A "1970 Plan for National Economy" by the State Council and a report to intensify "preparedness against war" by the Central Military Commission were adopted. Chen Boda proposed to appoint a State President, but Mao Zedong opposed. According to the official CCP historiography, Lin Biao attempted a later aborted "coup" during this meeting.
