= Siping Campaign =

Battle of the Chinese Civil War

- Part of the Chinese Civil War
Date	June 11, 1947 – March 13, 1948
Location	Siping, Jilin, China
Result	Communist victory

Belligerents
Flag of the National Revolutionary Army National Revolutionary Army	PLA People's Liberation Army

Commanders and leaders
Chen Mingren; Chen Cheng	Li Tianyou; Lin Biao

Strength
55,000	60,000

Casualties and losses
35,000	20,000

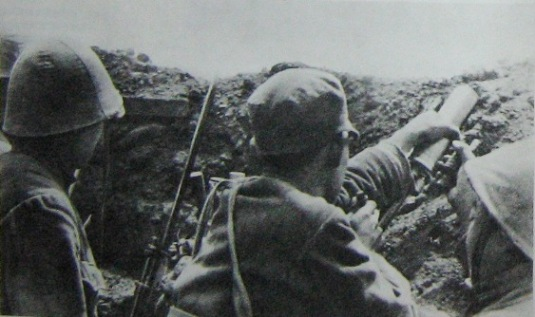
Communist troops in the Battle of Siping

The Siping Campaign (四平战役) was a nine-month struggle between the communist and the Nationalists for Siping in Jilin, China during the Chinese Civil War in the post World War II era, and resulted in communist victory.

== Prelude ==
By the early June 1947, the communists had successfully isolated Siping (city) in their Summer Offensive of 1947 in Northeast China, the communists decided to take the city despite the fact that they had totally lacked the experience of taking strongly defended cities that are heavily fortified, and it was obvious to both sides that the isolated city would be the next battlefield. Siping (city) was defended by three divisions belong to two separate armies and the commander of the nationalist 71st Army, Chen Mingren (陈明仁) was named as the nationalist commander-in-chief of the urban defense. All three nationalist divisions suffered greatly in earlier battles and none of them was fully manned. However, the communists had eradicated nationalists in the region from Tieling in the south and Changchun in the north, and most of these nationalist forces had retreated to Siping (city). Chen Mingren (陈明仁) successfully recruited and incorporated these forces into his force, and every able bodied-man who had a governmental job was also recruited into the local garrison. Construction for additional fortifications and strengthening the current ones was also completed in very short span of time, and in a devoted effort, many bunkers were built by sacks full of wheat and starch of American aid. On June 3, 1947, Chiang Kai-shek flew to Shenyang and personally wrote to Chen Mingren (陈明仁) stating that Siping (city) was a very important location in Northeast China and if lost, the nationalists would not only lose Northeast China, but also endangering the rest of China, so the city must be defended at all cost, and Chen Mingren (陈明仁) was determined to hold the city, and the nationalist reporters claimed the city as Chen Mingren (陈明仁)'s fortress after witnessing the extensive defensive complex built.

On June 9, 1947, the enemy had completed its regroup outside the city for the upcoming attack. However, the communist made a serious intelligence blunder in underestimating the defenders' strength by only assessing the total nationalist strength as 18,000, and even Lin Biao had erroneously believed that there were only four fully combat capable nationalist regiments with full strength in the city. The enemy had missed the significant intelligence including the defenders receiving airdrop of 400 tons of supplies and weaponry in more than 200 sorties from Shenyang, and the rapid new construction of the fortifications. The defenders' recruitment of previously defeated nationalist forces into the local garrison was completely undetected by the enemy, and enemy did not expect the nationalist air force would actively participate in the first stage in support of the ground troops defending the city either. This serious intelligence blunder would have to be paid with an extremely heavy price later in the first stage of the campaign.

== Order of battle ==
Defenders: Nationalist order of battle:

- First stage (more than 35,000 troops total):
  - The 87th Division of the 71st Army
  - The 88th Division of the 71st Army
  - The 54th Division of the 13th Army
- Second stage:

Nationalist units with more than 19,000 troops

Attackers: communist order of battle:

- The 1st Column
- The 7th Column
- The 6th Column (First stage)
- The 3rd Column (Second Stage)

== First stage ==
On June 11, 1947, the communists begun their assault on the nationalist positions outside the city, and on the same night, the airport at the western suburb of the city was taken by the communist 7th Column. On June 13, 1947, the communist 1st Column took Xinlitun, and the nationalist air force begun to attack enemy ground positions at a rate of near twenty sorties per day in order to support the defenders of the city. On June 14, 1947, Lin Biao ordered the 11th Division and the 12th Division of the communist 4th Column to strike south toward Shenyang and Fushun to distract nationalist forces stationed in those cities from reinforcing Siping (city), and to take Fushun if possible. At 8:00 PM on June 14, 1947, the assault on the city itself had begun with five communist artillery battalions with near a hundred large caliber artillery pieces starting to bombard the city, even the 12 anti-aircraft artilleries in the communist inventory were deployed to shell the city. The shelling shocked the nationalist defenders since merely a year ago, artillery was still an extremely rare commodity for the communists, yet a year later the communist artillery firepower was greater than that of Japanese during World War II. Under the cover of intense artillery shelling, the communist 1st Column and 7th Column attacked the defenders from multiple directions.

Forty minutes after the assault begun, the 2nd Division of the communist 1st Column breached the defense in the southwest, and by 2:00 AM on June 15, 1947, the 1st Division of the communist 1st Column also penetrated into the city from Haifeng Village (Haifeng Tun, 海丰屯). However, the communist 7th Column and the 3rd Division of the communist 1st Column failed to breach the defense, and nationalist reserve launched multiple counterattacks on the enemy under the air cover, which had increased into more than twenty sorties per day. By June 16, 1947, the communists 1st Division and the 2nd Division inside the city had beaten back defenders' counterattacks for more than a dozen times, but in doing so, each suffered more than 1,500 casualties. The regions inside the city taken by the enemy was relatively small and only a thousand or so defenders were captured alive by the enemy, but situation for the defenders worsened on June 18, 1947, when the communist 7th Column breached the defense in northwest. The nationalists had underestimated the enemy's resolution to take the city, and defenders' stubborn resistance was equally out of expectation of the attacking communists as battle raged on with heavy casualties on both sides. By June 19, 1947, Lin Biao was forced to send the 17th Division and the 18th Division of the communist 6th Column to reinforce the communists fighting inside the city. With the newly arrived help, the enemy was able to take nationalist strongholds at the Telecommunication Building, the Municipal Building, and the Central Bank Building, and the nationalist headquarters of the 71st Army that was also the headquarters of the urban defense was besieged.

There were many brick buildings in Siping (city) and bricks made from black earth were extremely tough that when hit by 60 mm mortar rounds, there was only a dent left. The defenders capitalized on these strong buildings and turned them into formidable fortifications, and the nationalist 71st Army headquarters was located in one of such bunkers, with the entrance sealed by a jeep. In addition to wide field of view, there were also dozens bunkers and pillboxes protected by minefields around the buildings to strengthen the defense. On June 20, 1947, the 17th Division of the communist 6th Column unleashed its assault on the nationalist headquarters, and by the evening, the enemy was dangerously close. Chen Mingren (陈明仁), the nationalist commander-in-chief inside the headquarters was forced to evacuate into another alternate headquarters in a different bunker in the eastern half of the city, while his brother, Chen Mingxin (陈明信), the regimental commander of the Specialized Duties Regiment of the nationalist 71st Army, was left to defend the original headquarters. After three hours of fierce fighting, the headquarters fell and its defenders were annihilated. Chen Mingxin (陈明信), the regimental commander of the Specialized Duties Regiment of the nationalist 71st Army, was captured alive by the enemy, and the stronghold that the nationalists claimed to withstand enemy attack for more than a month fell in just three short hours. The fall of the nationalist 71st Army headquarters had signaled the fall of the western half of the city into the enemy hands, but the enemy had paid a very heavy price: the 1st Division and the 2nd Division of the communist 1st Column, and the Independent 1st Division and the Independent 2nd Division of the communist 7th Column suffered heavy casualties that they were forced out of action, and Ma Renxing (马仁兴), the divisional commander of the 1st Independent Division of the communist 7th Column, became the highest ranked communist officer killed in the campaign.

After more than a week of fierce fighting, the enemy finally took western half of the city with heavy loss. Only then did the enemy realize the serious blunder of the underestimation of the defenders: the nationalists defending the city was not 18,000 like previously thought, but almost twice, totaling more than 35,000. On June 21, 1947, the enemy was forced to send their reserves to join the fight: the 16th Division of the communist 6th Column and the Independent 3rd Division of the communist 7th Column join the assault on the eastern half of city, and Hong Xuezhi, (洪学智), the commander-in-chief of the communist 6th Column succeeded Li Tianyou (李天佑), the commander-in-chief of the communist 1st Column in the last part of the fighting as the communist commander in charge of taking the city. Chen Mingren (陈明仁), the nationalist commander-in-chief of the urban defense, concentrated his remaining 20,000 strong force in the eastern half of the city, and by the evening of June 21, 1947, had successfully beaten back all enemy attacks. For the communists, it was impossible to achieve numerical superiority after sending in two divisions following the withdraw of four divisions, and the Independent 1st Division of the communist 7th Column withdrawn earlier was forced to be back in action again. The highest point in the Siping (city) was a water tower, and the nationalists turned it into a formidable bunker manned by tough veterans of the Chinese Expeditionary Force in Burma and India during World War II, and these sharpshooters armed with light machine guns had successfully beaten back attacks by an entire enemy regiment for four times. After concentrating over a dozen machine guns suppressing the nationalist fire from the loopholes of the bunker to cover sappers setting up the explosives, the enemy finally neutralized the bunker in its fifth attempt.

At the railroad crossing bridge, the defenders used an ingenious tactic by deploying beans: as three attacks by the communist 8th Regiment of the 1st Column were beaten back, the enemy launched their fourth attack personally led by the regimental political commissar Jin Ke (金可), and it appeared that the fourth attack might be successful. However, the defenders unleashed their secret weapon by opening two large sacks of beans which suddenly filled the ground. Everyone in the unsuspecting enemy assault team slid down and had very difficult time of getting up, and with beans on the ground, it was impossible to advance, retreat or reinforce, thus the enemy assault team was completely wiped out. Jin Ke (金可), the regimental political commissar of the communist 8th Regiment of the 1st Column leading the fourth charge, was cut in half at the chest by a string of defenders' machine gun fire in front of the regimental commander of the communist 8th Regiment of the 1st Column, Guan Shanlin (关山林), and thus became the second highest ranked communist officer killed in action during the campaign. The streets of Siping (city) was covered with blood and soldiers of both sides frequently slid down, and the situation became desperate for the defenders that Chen Mingren (陈明仁), the nationalist commander-in-chief of the urban defense, was preparing to commit suicide and had his Browning pistol ready. Chen Mingren (陈明仁) also ordered the defenders to burn every building after it was abandoned so that the attacking enemy would not be able to use it. After fierce battles, the last counterattack of the nationalist 71st Army was beaten back with heavy loss in the morning of June 23, 1947, but the communist 1st Independent Division of the 7th Column suffered equally and was forced out of action once again for the second time. Although the defenders could no longer launch anymore counterattacks to the smallest scale, they were still able to put up a good defensive fight in their fortifications, but as time dragged on, even the defenders themselves begun to have serious doubts how long before the city would fall into the enemy hands.

The communists were overconfident that the city would fall for sure, and their New China News Agency had already issued a press release at the time, claiming that "…After 12 days of fierce fighting, the enemy (nationalists) had suffered over 16,000 casualties and remaining survivors had nowhere to flee. The majority of the Siping had been under our (communist) control, and Chiang's army had been annihilated, and our troops (communists) were expanding the military success…". On June 28, 1947, the communist commander Chen Yi (communist) even sent a telegraph congratulating Lin Biao for taking the city. Nothing could be further from the truth as the situation suddenly turned drastically in nationalist favor: on June 29, 1947, the nationalist reinforcement rapidly approached the city thanks to their mechanization, the nationalist 93rd Army approached the city on the same day Lin Biao received the telegraph from Chen Yi (communist), while on June 29, 1947, the nationalist New 6th Army took Benxi and from there pushed toward Siping (city), while the nationalist 53rd Army on the left of the New 6th Army also pushed toward Siping (city) in unison. The highly mechanized nationalist armies was able to bypass the enemy and thus not only the nationalist reinforcement had avoided been ambushed by the enemy, now the enemy force attacking the city was threatened. The table had turned for the enemy.

Lin Biao's choice was clear, on June 30, 1947, he ordered a general withdraw that concluded the first stage of Siping Campaign. The exhausted defenders had no strength left to give any chase and the nationalist reinforcement did not pursuit the enemy either after reaching the city, and thus did not see any action, just like the five enemy armies to the south of the city originally planned to ambush them. The nationalists suffered over 19,000 casualties while the communist suffered over 13,000 casualties. The nationalists had successfully beaten back the enemy and held the city. In addition to the enemy's grave underestimation of the defenders' strength, the associating indecisiveness of Lin Biao also contributed to the nationalist success at the first stage of the campaign: Lin Biao was trying to increase the gain of the communist Summer Offensive of 1947 in Northeast China by deploying seventeen divisions to the south of Siping (city) in the hope of ambush nationalist reinforcement, but this had not materialized. The seven remaining communist divisions were simply not enough to take on the five technically superior nationalist Divisions defending the city. Furthermore, only after suffering heavy losses, did the two more divisions were redeployed to join the fight, but by then the communists were unable to achieve any numerical superiority at all, following the withdraw of four divisions and earlier heavy losses. However, the communists would not forget their goal and they would be back with vengeance, as well as the valuable experience learned from this first attempt. For the nationalists, the city was still in their hands, but the nationalist original plan to fight a decisive battle to annihilate the enemy at the gate of Siping (city) was equally spoiled by Lin Biao's wise and timely retreat, and thus the first stage of the campaign ended in a stalemate.

== Second stage ==
After their victory of the Autumn Offensive of 1947 in Northeast China, the communists set their sights on the Siping (city) again in their Winter Offensive of 1947 in Northeast China, and this time they were ready and much better prepared. By this time, the nationalists in Northeast China had suffered greatly and Siping (city) was only garrisoned by a mere 19,000 troops, without any hope of reinforcement. The first sign of trouble appeared when a transportation battalion of the nationalist 88th Division was ambushed on January 26, 1948, at Guo Family's Hotel (Guo Jia Dian, 郭家店) as the 500-men strong battalion attempted to transport grains to the city. Though the enemy attack was considered unlikely, the nationalists nonetheless doubled the strength of the battalion and assigned over a dozen trucks and over 100 horse-drawn carts to ensure the safe completion of the job. Learning the news, Luo Jie (罗杰), the deputy commander-in-chief of the communist base at the border area of Liaoning and Jilin, personally lead the units of the communist 18th Regiment and the Mongolian Cavalry Regiment launched a long distance surprise attack before dawn on the unsuspecting nationalist transportation battalion. In a short period of 40 minutes, over 70 nationalist soldiers were killed and more than 200 were captured alive by the enemy. The rest of the nationalists were able to successfully escape by trucks, but a truck and all of the 100+ horse-drawn carts full of grains had to be abandoned and left intact for the enemy in the hasty retreat. On February 27, 1948, the order was formally given to take the city and the commander-in-chief of the communist 1st Column, Li Tianyou (李天佑), the communist commander in charge of last assault on the city nearly nine months ago, was put in charge again for the second time. Similarly, two communist columns participated in the assault on the city nearly nine months ago, the 1st Column and the 7th Column, were tasked to take the city, with the help of the communist 3rd Column, while the communist 2nd Column, 6th Column, 8th Column, and 10th Column were deployed to stop any possible nationalist reinforcement that never came, because the nationalist strength was greatly reduced by this time.

On March 4, 1948, the enemy assault on the nationalist positions outside the city begun, and the communist 1st Division of the 1st Column took Haifeng Village (Hai Feng Tun, 海丰屯) and Xu Family's Yaodong (Xu Jia Yao, 徐家窑), while the 3rd Division of the communist 1st Column took Xinlitun. The enemy had made significant gains on March 8, 1948, when most of the nationalist positions outside the city wall fell in a domino effect: the 7th Division of the communist 3rd Column took the bunkers outside the eastern gate, while the 8th Division of the communist 3rd Column took the region of Red Mouth (Hong Zui Zi, 红嘴子). Meanwhile, the 19th Division of the communist 7th Column took the Third Line of Grove (San Dao Lin Zi, 三道林子). In order to find better positions for the artilleries to shell the defenders, the enemy took Shidao (师道) School, the airport and the Liu Family's Village (Liu Jia Tun, 刘家屯). At 7:40 PM on March 12, 1948, the final assault on the city begun. The nationalist defense was soon breached in five fronts in the north, the east, and the west, and defenders had to resort to street fights for their last stand. By the next day, the nationalist defeat was complete when the entire nationalist garrison of more than 19,000 was totally annihilated by the attacking enemy, who declared the victory on 7:00 PM on March 13, 1948, after the mopping up operation was completed.

== Outcome ==
The important strategic stronghold had fallen into the enemy hands with the nationalist defeat, and the defenders lost over 35,000 troops, with more than 16,000 in the first major battle, and over 19,000 in the second battle. In addition to capturing the city, the enemy also captured enormous supplies from the nationalists, including 491 machine guns, over 9,000 repeating rifles, over 779,000 rounds of ammunition, over 200 artillery pieces, and over 11,000 rounds of artillery ammunition.

== See also ==
- Outline of the Chinese Civil War
- National Revolutionary Army
- History of the People's Liberation Army
