= Chen Mingren =

Founding PLA and former NRA general (1903–1974)

Colonel General Chen Mingren
- 陈明仁
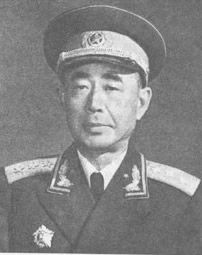

Acting Provincial Chairman of Hunan Province
- In office July 1949 – August 1949
- Chairman: Mao Zedong

Personal details
- Born: 7 April 1903 Liling, Hunan, Qing Empire
- Died: May 21, 1974 (aged 71) Beijing
- Party: Chinese Communist Party
- Education: Whampoa Military Academy; Lushan Officer Training Corps
- Awards: Order of Blue Sky and White Sun; Order of Liberation (First Class Medal)

Military service
- Allegiance: Republic of China; People's Republic of China
- Branch/service: National Revolutionary Army (1924–47); Republic of China Army (1947–49); People's Liberation Army Ground Force (1949–74)
- Years of service: 1924–1974
- Rank: Colonel General of the PLA (awarded 1955); General (2nd Class) of the ROCA
- Commands: NRA 71st Army; PLA 55th Army
- Battles/wars: Central Plains War; Encirclement Campaigns; Sino-Japanese War; Chinese Civil War

Chen Mingren (simplified Chinese: 陈明仁; traditional Chinese: 陳明仁; pinyin: Chén Míngrén; 7 April 1903 – 21 May 1974) was a prominent military figure from Liling, Hunan Province, and one of the founding members of the People's Liberation Army. He was a top-level military commander in the Republic of China. He then joined the forces of the Chinese Communist Party in 1949. Chen was awarded the rank of Colonel General in 1955.

== Biography ==
=== Early years ===
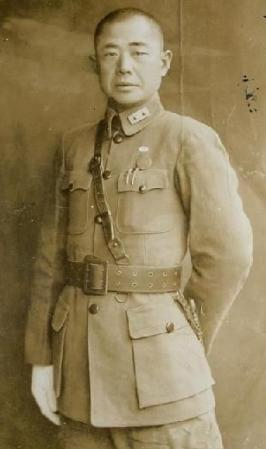
Chen as a Republic of China military officer in the 1920s

Chen was born into family of farmers in Hunan on 7 April 1903. He went through his education in private institutions and underwent military training in 1924. On 19 November 1924, he was transferred to the Whampoa Military Academy. Upon his graduation and stellar military performance during the Northern Expedition, he rose through the ranks quickly. By 1928, he was a Colonel in the National Revolutionary Army.

He was the general of the 24th Revolutionary Army (ROC) during the Central Plains War whom led a Pyrrhic victory against Shi Yousan. He was appointed as the 88th Division commander in 1932 and led the Republican Armies against the Chinese Communist Party's Red Army in Jiangxi and Fujian during the encirclement campaigns. Following his defeat to the Communists in 1934 at Shaxian County, Chen was transferred to the Lushan Military Academy. Upon his graduation and the trust he had over Chiang Kai-shek, he was appointed into the Republican Senate for military affairs and became the Director of the Kuomintang Military Department.

=== Sino-Japanese and Chinese Civil War ===
After the outbreak of the Second Sino-Japanese War in 1937, Chen was appointed as a lieutenant-general in the 2nd Army Division (reserve division). Between 1937 and 1939, he held key positions such as being the commander of the Changsha, Hengyang, Hengyang, Leiyang garrisons. In the winter of 1941, he was appointed as the deputy commander of the 71st ROC Army. In January 1945, the Chinese Expeditionary Force mobilized its main force to besiege Huilong Mountain in Wanding, a key town on the Burma Road, but failed to capture it after a prolonged siege. Chen Mingren decided to employ a feint attack, drawing away the defending Japanese troops while the main attacking force used encirclement and division tactics to defeat them piecemeal. A division would then be used to outflank and cut off the Japanese retreat to Burma, annihilating the entire Japanese force. Simultaneously, he requested air support from the Allied forces, emphasizing that coordinated infantry, artillery, and air power was essential for victory.

In 1946, the 71st Army was transported by US warships to the Northeast in preparation for the anticipated Chinese Civil War. With the start of the Summer Offensive of 1947 in Northeast China by Communist general Lin Biao, Chen's 71st Army was forced to retreat to and rendezvous at Siping, Jilin. Mustering local forces and his own army, he had around 30 thousand man waiting from reinforcements.

Between 22 May and 30 June 1947, Chen was able to repel the Chinese Red Army in Northeast China that was led by Li Tianyou. In June, he was able to resist the overwhelming forces under the command of Lin Biao at Siping Street for more than 40 days. For his gallant efforts, he was awarded with the Order of Blue Sky and White Sun and was promoted to the 7th Corps Commander. Although successful in the initial stages of the Siping Campaign, the Communist forces who surrounded the stronghold managed to break the Nationalist defenses following a nine-month long assault.

At the eve of the Huaihai Campaign, Bai Chongxi recommended Chen Mingren to Chiang Kai-shek as the garrison commander of Wuhan. Chen transferred to his Wuhan office in October 1948 was concurrently the commander of the 29th Nationalist Army. He became the First Corps Commander and the provincial chairman of the Hunan Provincial Government.

=== After the establishment of the People's Republic of China ===
On 4 August 1949, Chen and Cheng Qian launched an uprising and joined the Communists at Changsha. Within a year, he became a Deputy Director of the Changsha Military Control Commission, a Deputy Commander of the Hunan Military Region and a member of the Hunan People's Military and Political Committee. After being encouraged by Mao Zedong and Zhou Enlai to continue his military service, he joined the People's Liberation Army. He was made a three-star general in 1955 and died in 1974.

== In popular culture ==
It is said that the main character of the 2010 TV series The Insider, General Chen Huaiyuan, played by actor Sun Chun, was inspired by Chen Mingren and his famous defection in 1949.
