= Autumn Offensive of 1947 in Northeast China =

Part of the Chinese Civil War

- Part of the Chinese Civil War
Date	September 14 – November 5, 1947
Location	Northeast China
Result	Communist victory

Belligerents
Flag of the National Revolutionary Army National Revolutionary Army	PLA People's Liberation Army

Commanders and leaders
Chen Cheng; Chiang Kai-shek	(China) Lin Biao (China) Luo Ronghuan

Strength
500,000	510,000

Casualties and losses
Nationalist claim : 37,560 killed, wounded, missing, or captured Communist claim : 69,000	Unknown

The Autumn Offensive of 1947 in Northeast China (Chinese: 東北1947年秋季戰役) was a series of battles initiated by the communists against the nationalists during the Chinese Civil War after World War II.

== Prelude ==
After the defeats of the Summer Offensive of 1947 in Northeast China, Chiang Kai-shek removed Xiong Shihui, the political leader, and Du Yuming, the military commander, of the northeast China and replaced them with Chief of the General Staff Chen Cheng. With the arrival of the 49th Army from China proper, the total nationalist strength in northeast China numbered half a million, numbering forty-five divisions belonging to ten armies, which in turn, belonged to four corps. Chen Cheng deployed his troops in major cities such as Changchun, Siping, Shenyang, Jinzhou and along the railways linking these cities, and planned to attack the communists when more troops arrived from China proper.

In northeast China, meanwhile, the communists had twenty-seven Divisions that belonged to nine columns, and twelve independent divisions (including two cavalry divisions), and local garrisons. This totaled 510,000 troops, slightly more than its nationalist opponent. The communists mainly occupied regions in western Liaoning, and regions along the railways from Changchun to Greater Stone Bridge (Dashiqiao), and from Shenyang to Jilin. The communists planned to launch an offensive in late September by first attacking the southern front of the nationalists where the defense was the weakest, and then annihilate large amount of the nationalist force by ambushing the nationalist reinforcement from north. However, on September 6, 1947, to secure the railway communication line, three nationalist Divisions begun their push toward Jianchang from Xingcheng, Suizhong and Jinxi, and the communists consequently adjusted their schedule accordingly by launching the offensive early on September 14, 1947.

== Nationalist order of battle ==
- The Newly Organized 1st Army
- The Newly Organized 6th Army
- The 3rd Cavalry Army
- The 49th Army
- The 52nd Army
- The 53rd Army
- The 60th Army
- The 71st Army
- The 207th Division of the Youth Army
- Six divisions from China proper in the latter stage of the offensive

== Communist order of battle ==
To achieve their objective, the communists established three commands:

- The 1st frontline command headed by commander Xiao Jinguang and political commissar Xiao Hua, which was assigned to attack nationalist troops in the region between Liaoyang and Greater Stone Bridge (Dashiqiao), and the region between Tieling and Changtu. This command included:
  - The 3rd Column
  - The 4th Column
  - Three independent divisions
- The 2nd frontline command headed by commander and political commissar Cheng Zihua, which was tasked to fight the nationalists defending the railways from Shanhai Pass to Jinzhou and from Chengde to Jinzhou. This command included:
  - The 8th Column
  - The 9th Column
  - Four independent Divisions
- The high command headed by commander Lin Biao and political commissar Luo Ronghuan, which was assigned to annihilate enemy in the regions between Siping (city) and Changchun. This command included:
  - The 1st Column
  - The 2nd Column
  - The 6th Column
  - The 7th Column
  - The 10th Column
  - Three independent divisions

== First stage ==
On September 14, 1947, the nationalist westward push was met head on with stiff communist resistance. At dawn, the nationalist 50th Division at the left front was badly mauled by the communist 8th Column and the 1st Independent Division at the Pear Tree Ditch Gate (Lishu Gou Men) region, and was forced to turn back. The communist force did not pursuit the retreating remnant of 50th Division, but instead, turned to the nationalist 22nd Division at the central front, wiping out the enemy at the region between Yang's Family's Pole (Yangjia Zhangzi) and Old Gate (Jiu Men). The nationalist 60th Division at the right front immediately withdrew after learning the news of the annihilation of forces at the other two fronts and after failing to catch up with the retreating enemy, the communists withdrew to the west for rest and regroup. In the meantime, the communist 9th Column were order to the Jinxi and Yang's Family's Pole (Yangjia Zhangzi) for reinforcement to face the renewed nationalist attack that was certain to come.

Three days later on September 17, 1947, the expected renewed nationalist attack resumed as the nationalist 49th Army begun its push toward Jianchang from Jinzhou. When the nationalist 49th Army reached Yang's Family's Pole (Yangjia Zhangzi), it was surrounded by the waiting communist 8th Column and the 1st Independent Division. The nationalists sent out two brigades totaling six regiments to reinforce their besieged 49th Army, but they were stopped by the communist 24th Division of the 8th Column and the communist 26th Division of the 9th Column at the region of Hongluojian, west of Jinxi and the region of Senior Border (Lao Bian), northwest of Jinxi. On September 22, 1947, the nationalist 49th Army attempted to breakout and flee south, but was completely annihilated at the region of Senior Border (Lao Bian). The communist 2nd frontline command then directed all of its resources to destruct the railway from Jinzhou to Shanhai Pass, which was completed successfully, thus greatly reduced the nationalist transportation capacity.

== Second stage ==
The continuous defeats forced Chen Cheng to send the newly organized 6th Army from Tieling to reinforce Jinzhou, leaving the region between Siping and Tieling vulnerable. The communists decided to take this advantage by concentrating three columns totaling eight divisions to attack Xifeng, Changtu, Kaiyuan, and annihilate the nationalist 53rd Army in the process. However, as communists were massing their troops on September 29, those regrouped at Xifeng were revealed by the nationalist aerial reconnaissance and the nationalist garrisons at Xifeng and adjacent regions immediately withdrew to safety, thus avoiding being surrounded by the enemy. communists then changed their strategy by ordering the 1st Column, 2nd Column, 6th Column, and 10th Column to be deployed to the regions to the north and south of Siping (city), and to Jiangmi Peak (Jiangmi Feng) located to the northeast of Jilin City, so that the nationalist Newly Organized 1st Army, the 60th Army and the 71st Army would be tied up. In the morning of October 1, 1947, the communist 1st Division of the 1st Column and the communist 3rd Column had succeeded in surrounding the 116th Division of the nationalist 53rd Army at Weiyuan Bunker (Weiyuan Bao) southwest of Xifeng, and after nineteen hours of fierce battle, the 116th Division was completely annihilated.

To the south of Xifeng, the nationalist 130th Division of the 53rd Army was defeated by the communist 10th Division and the 12th Division of the 4th Column, losing an entire regiment at regions between Sable Skin Village (Diaopi Tun) and Eight Trees (Bakeshu). Meanwhile, with the help of the communist 1st Independent Division, the communist 11th Division of the 4th Column penetrated into the region between Liaoyang and Greater Stone Bridge (Dashiqiao), taking Greater Stone Bridge (Dashiqiao), and Haicheng, threatening Anshan and Liaoyang. The nationalist 25th Division of the 52nd Army was defeated by the communist 1st Independent Division at regions between Ox Village (Niuzhuang) and Haicheng, and was forced to retreat after losing an entire regiment. After marching 80 km by foot in one day, the communist 21st Division of the 7th Column suddenly besieged Faku, and completely annihilated local garrison outside the city, the nationalist 7th Security Regiment after two hours of fierce fighting on October 1, 1947. The 19th Division of the communist 7th Column, in the meantime, took Zhangwu after completely annihilated the local garrison, a regiment of the nationalist 57th Division.

The continuous communist offensives in the regions to the east and west of Kaiyuan had forced the Newly Organized 1st Army to divert from its original objective to reinforce Kaiyuan instead, and the Newly Organized 6th Army had to return to Tieling, while the nationalist main forces of Gongzhuling and Village of the Fan Family (Fanjia Tun) were ordered to Siping (city) to strengthen the defense of the city. Well aware that the fortified strongholds were difficult to take, the communists turned their attention to destroying the railways to further hamper the nationalist transportation capacity.

== Third Stage ==
To reverse the nationalist situation in northeast China, Chiang Kai-shek personally flew to Shenyang on October 8, to provide guidelines for the new strategy. In addition, new nationalist reinforcement totaling six divisions were drawn from China proper, including:

- The 21st Division of the 92nd Army
- The 43rd Division of the 94th Army
- The 10th Division of the 3rd Army
- The 11th Division of the 3rd Army
- The 4th Cavalry Division
- The 54th Division of the 13th Army

The communists, in turn, planned to deploy six columns to lure out the enemy from their fortified positions and then annihilate them in the open field where they are most vulnerable by faking the assaults on Jilin City and Kaiyuan, while another three columns were deployed to stop the nationalist reinforcement from China proper.

On October 9, 1947, the communist 7th Column attacked Xinlitun, badly mauling the local nationalist garrison, the 57th Division. From October 10–12, the communist 8th Column and the 9th Column secured most of the regions between Jinzhou and Xingcheng (with a few exception of strongholds to the west of Jinzhou ), killing more than 1,200 nationalist troops in the process. On October 15, 1947, Yi County (Yi Xian, 义县) was besieged by the communists. By October 17, Fuxin had fallen into the communist hands after the attacking communist 7th Column had completely annihilated the local nationalist garrison, a brigade and a regiment of the nationalist 51st Division. The success of the communist 7th Column, 8th Column and the 9th Column had prevented any nationalist reinforcement from reaching north of Shenyang.

With the newly arrived reinforcement, the nationalists launched a counteroffensive headed by the 21st Division from Haizhou (海州), the 43rd Division from Heishan (黑山), and the 195th Division and 22nd Division from Xinmin, which resulted in retaking Fuxin, Zhangwu, and Xinlitun by October 22. Unbeknown to the nationalists, the communists set a trap by giving up more land to spread the nationalist thin. The primary objective of the communists was to annihilate the nationalist 21st Division and the 43rd Division. To draw the nationalist farther to the west, the communist 9th Column took Chaoyang on October 23 after wiping out the local nationalist garrison, a regiment of the 53rd Division and a detachment of the 3rd Cavalry Army. The nationalist 21st Division and the 43rd Division were therefore lured westward to reinforce the local nationalist garrison, and on October 29, 1947, both divisions were surrounded by the enemy four times of their size at regions bordered by Chaoyang Temple (Chaoyang Si), Nine Pass Stage Gate (Jiu Guan Tai Men), and Daiguan Bunker (Daiguan Bao). By November 2, the eight communist divisions succeeded in badly mauling the two nationalist divisions and on November 4, the nationalist local garrison of Yi County (Yi Xian), the 4th Security Regiment, abandoned the town and retreated, but was completely annihilated on the way.

In western Liaoning, the communist launched another round of offensive, taking Huapichang, Jiuzhan, Kouqian, Wulajie, Jiutai, Nong’an, and Dehui, after wiping out a regiment of the nationalist 53rd Division, two regiments of the Newly Organized 1st Army, a security regiment, and badly mauling the 182nd Division of the 60th Army. In addition, an entire regiment of the nationalist 207th Division of the Youth Army was also lost to the enemy east of Fushun. The communist victories threatened Jilin (city) and Changchun.

To strengthen the defense of Changchun and Jilin City, Chen Cheng ordered part of the nationalist force to be airlifted to Changchun from Shenyang, and the Newly Organized 1st Army also turned to Changchun to reinforce the defense of the city. Knowing that it was nearly impossible to take the fortified strongholds with huge defending forces, the communist wisely concluded the autumn offensive on November 5, 1947.

== Outcome ==
The communist offensive succeeded in taking fifteen cities and towns from the nationalists and inflicting more than 69,000 casualties on the enemy. The nationalist redeployment of six divisions from China proper to northeast China weakened the nationalist strength in the battlefront in other part of China so thus the communists offensive in northeast China had succeeded in reducing the nationalist pressure on communists in China proper. The communists victory also provided the foundation of their next offensive, the Winter Offensive of 1947 in Northeast China. The nationalist commander Chen Cheng had already suggested to abandon northeast China a year ago in 1946, so troops could be freed to fight in the other regions in China proper where nationalists would have better chance for victories, and when the situation had improved, the nationalist would then be able to retake northeast China. However, this correct suggestion was ignored because the political fallout of abandoning the resource rich and industrial northeast China was simply perceived as too great to be carried out. As a result, Chen Cheng was tasked with an impossible job and therefore should not be blamed for nationalist failure in northeast China, because probably nobody else could perform any better under the same uncompromising belief, including the communist commanders, had their positions had been exchanged with the nationalists.

== See also ==
- Outline of the Chinese Civil War
- List of Battles of Chinese Civil War
- National Revolutionary Army
- History of the People's Liberation Army
