= Deng Hua =

Chinese general

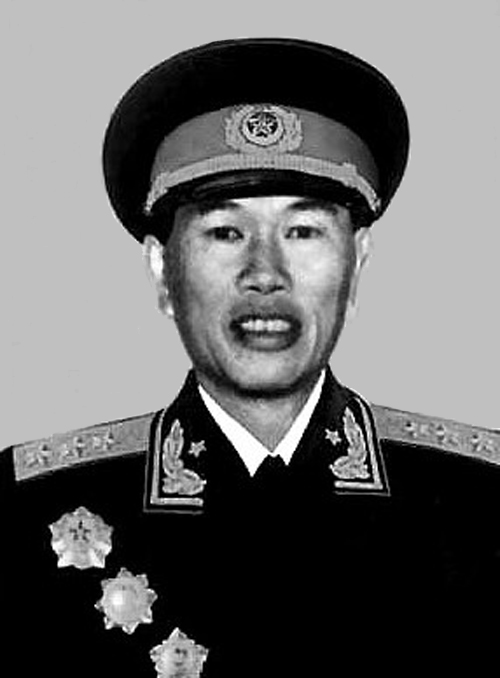
- Native name: 邓华
- Born: Deng Duohua; April 28, 1910; Chenzhou, Hunan, Qing China
- Died: July 3, 1980 (aged 70) Shanghai, China
- Allegiance: China
- Branch: People's Liberation Army
- Rank: General
- Commands: People's Volunteer Army; Shenyang Military Region
- Conflicts: Chinese Civil War; Second Sino-Japanese War; Korean War

Deng Hua (simplified Chinese: 邓华; traditional Chinese: 鄧華; pinyin: Dèng Huá; 28 April 1910 – 3 July 1980) was a Chinese military leader and general of the People's Liberation Army. He fought in the Chinese Civil War and was one of the principal commanders of the Chinese People's Volunteers during the Korean War, serving as First Deputy Commander under Peng Dehuai before becoming Acting Commander and Political Commissar in 1952. He later commanded the Chinese People's Volunteers until 1954 and played a leading role in the armistice negotiations that ended the war.

== Early life ==
Deng Hua was born on 28 April 1910 in Yongning Township, Chenzhou Prefecture, Hunan (now Beihu District in Chenzhou), into a scholarly family. His father, Deng Yangyuan, was a linsheng (廩生), a holder of a lower-level degree in the imperial examination system who received a government stipend, and worked as a private tutor in the local community. Deng received a traditional private education in his early childhood before attending Xinhua School in Chenzhou. In 1925, he enrolled at Yuyun Middle School in Changsha, where he became involved in the growing revolutionary movement, before later continuing his education at the Nanhua School of Law and Politics. Influenced by the political climate of the period, Deng joined the Chinese Communist Party in March 1927 on the recommendation of Yi Yun and Zha Yiping.

== Military career ==
Following the Changsha coup in 1927, Deng returned to his native Hunan, where he participated in the Southern Hunan Uprising the following year as an organizational officer in the Political Department of the 7th Division of the Chinese Red Army. In April 1928, he accompanied Zhu De and Chen Yi to the Jinggang Mountains, where their forces united with those of Mao Zedong. Deng subsequently held a series of political appointments within the Fourth Red Army, serving as Party representative of the 6th Company, 2nd Battalion, 33rd Regiment, later as an organizational officer of the 31st Regiment, and eventually as head of the Organization Section of the Political Department of the 3rd Column. He also attended the Gutian Conference, which established the Communist Party's principle of political control over the Red Army. During the Red Army's 1930 campaign against Changsha, Deng accompanied his unit from Changting in Fujian. Although the offensive against Changsha failed, the Red Army subsequently captured Ji'an in Jiangxi. Following the campaign, the unit was expanded into the 36th Division, with Deng appointed political commissar and Zhang Zongxun serving as division commander. In 1932, the division was redesignated as the 66th Division, with Deng remaining political commissar while Huang Yongsheng assumed command. Under their leadership, the division took part in the siege of Nanfeng, contributing to the Communist victory in the Fourth encirclement campaign against the Jiangxi Soviet.

Following further reorganizations of the Red Army, Deng entered the Advanced Command Course at the Red Army University in June 1934. He joined the Long March with the main force in October and, in September 1935, was appointed political commissar of the 2nd Battalion, 1st Column of the Shaanxi–Gansu Detachment. After the Red Army reached northern Shaanxi, he became director of the Political Department of the 2nd Division of the First Red Army Corps and participated in the Zhiluozhen Campaign. In 1936, he was appointed political commissar of the 1st Red Division before being transferred to the same post in the 2nd Red Division. During that year, he helped lead the Eastern Expedition into Shanxi, aimed at expanding Communist-controlled territory, and, after returning to northern Shaanxi in May, commanded forces against the Nationalists in the Battle of Shanchengbao in Gansu.

=== Second Sino-Japanese War ===
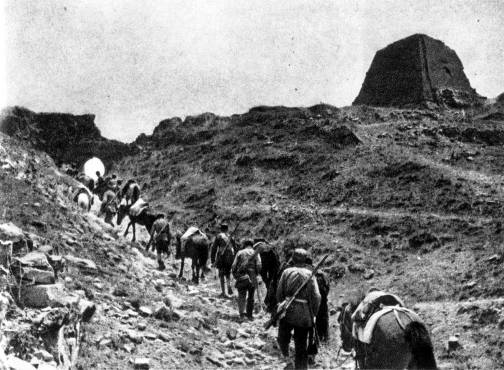
In June 1938, Deng Hua's detachment advanced into eastern Hebei and organized participation in the Jidong anti-Japanese armed uprising.

Following the outbreak of the Second Sino-Japanese War in 1937, Deng was appointed director of the Political Department and subsequently political commissar of the 685th Regiment of the Eighth Route Army's 115th Division. Serving alongside regimental commander Yang Dezhi, he participated in the Battle of Pingxingguan, where the regiment helped ambush Japanese forces in Shanxi in one of the Chinese Communist forces' first major victories of the war. Later that year, Deng became political commissar of the 115th Division's Independent Regiment under Yang Chengwu. As Communist forces expanded behind Japanese lines, the regiment was enlarged into the Independent Division and, following the establishment of the Jin-Cha-Ji Military Region in November 1937, was reorganized as the First Military Sub-district, with Yang serving as commander and Deng as political commissar. Deng later assumed command of the Pingxi Detachment, serving concurrently as commander and political commissar. He directed operations against Japanese encirclement campaigns in the Jin-Cha-Ji border region and helped establish the Pingxi Anti-Japanese Base Area.

In 1938, the Yanbei Detachment of the 120th Division under Song Shilun merged with Deng's First Detachment of the Jin-Cha-Ji Military Region—widely known as the "Deng Hua Detachment"—to form the Fourth Column of the Eighth Route Army. Song was appointed commander and Deng political commissar of the new force, which comprised approximately 5,300 troops. During the subsequent Eastern Hebei Advance, the column captured Yanqing, Yongning, Sihai, and Xinglong. Working with the CCP Ji-Re (Hebei–Jehol) Border Special Committee, it also helped launch the Eastern Hebei Uprising, which mobilized an anti-Japanese force of around 100,000 personnel and established the Eastern Hebei Anti-Japanese Base Area. The campaign ultimately ended in defeat after the force was encircled by Japanese and collaborationist troops and forced to withdraw to Pingxi. Following another ambush during the retreat, Deng accepted responsibility for the setback and requested disciplinary action and demotion. Following the establishment of the Ji-Re-Cha (Hebei–Jehol–Chahar) Advance Army in November 1938, Xiao Ke was appointed its commander and political commissar, while Deng became a member of its Military and Political Committee. In March 1940, Deng was appointed commander and political commissar of the Fifth Military Sub-district of the Jin-Cha-Ji Military Region. During this period, he participated in the Laiyuan–Lingqiu Campaign, one of the operations comprising the second phase of the Hundred Regiments Offensive. In 1941, Deng became commander and political commissar of the Fourth Military Sub-district of the Jin-Cha-Ji Military Region, while also serving as secretary of the local CCP prefectural committee. In February 1944, he was appointed political commissar of the Mobile Brigade of the Jin-Cha-Ji Military Region. Together with brigade commander Huang Yongsheng, he led the brigade to Yan'an, where he assumed the post of political commissar of the 2nd Teaching Brigade of the Shaanxi–Gansu–Ningxia–Jin-Sui Joint Defence Force. In November 1944, he entered the Central Party School of the Chinese Communist Party for further study.

=== Second-half of the Chinese Civil War ===
Following the end of the Second Sino-Japanese War in 1945, Deng was sent to Northeast China, where he arrived in Shenyang and was appointed deputy commander of the Northeast Security Command and commander of the Shenyang Garrison. In December, he became commander of the Liaoxi Military District. After participating in the Battle of Xiushuihezi in Liaoning, he led Communist forces in the first assault on Siping in March 1946, capturing the city. During the Second Battle of Siping the following month, however, Communist forces were compelled to withdraw. In June 1946, the Liaoxi Military District was reorganized as the Liaoji Military District, with Deng remaining as its commander. In 1947, Deng took part in the Third Battle of Siping before being appointed commander of the Liaoji Column of the Northeast Democratic Allied Army. The formation was subsequently redesignated as the 7th Column of the Fourth Field Army, with Deng as commander, He Jinnian as deputy commander and Tao Zhu as political commissar. During the Northeast Autumn Offensive, Deng captured Faku without prior authorization from higher command, surprising the defending Nationalist 177th Division and destroying it. Over the following seventeen days, the 7th Column captured Zhangwu, Xinlitun, Fuxin and Xinqiu, defeating the Nationalist Temporary 51st and 57th Divisions.

In March 1948, Deng again led Communist forces in an assault on Siping, which was finally captured after repeated campaigns. During the Liaoshen Campaign, he commanded the 7th and 9th Columns in the main assault on Jinzhou. After intense urban fighting, the two columns captured the city along with the Nationalist commander Fan Hanjie and several senior officers. The following month, Deng led the 7th Column in the encirclement of Liao Yaoxiang's corps, during which the commander of the Nationalist 49th Army, Zheng Tingji, was captured. Following the Liaoshen Campaign, Deng advanced through Shanhaiguan with the main force of the Northeast People's Liberation Army during the Pingjin Campaign. The Central Military Commission initially planned to seize Tanggu, but after the offensive stalled Deng proposed redirecting the main effort against Tianjin, a recommendation that was accepted. During the subsequent Tianjin Campaign, he commanded the Eastern Group, leading the 7th and 8th Columns in the capture of the city and the Nationalist commanders Chen Changjie and Liu Yunhan. In April 1949, Deng was appointed commander of the 15th Corps of the Fourth Field Army. He subsequently led the corps during the Hunan–Jiangxi and Guangdong campaigns, capturing Guangzhou on 14 October 1949. The following month, he was concurrently appointed first deputy commander of the Guangdong Military District.

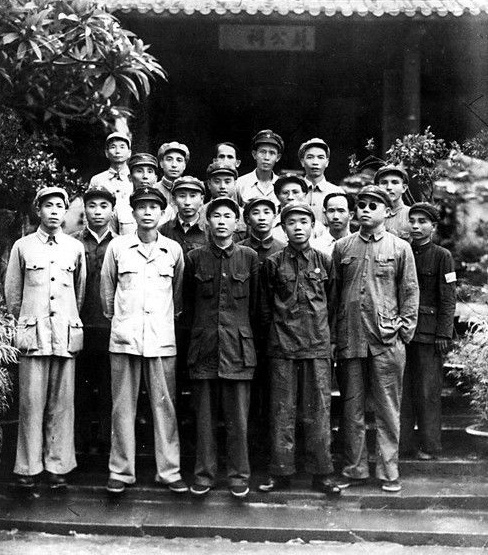
PLA generals who took part in the Battle of Hainan Island at Su Gong shrine in Qiongshan, Hainan. Deng is in front row; third from left (10 May 1950)

In December 1949, Deng was formally entrusted with command of the Battle of Hainan Island. Leading the 15th Corps together with the 40th and 43rd Armies, supporting artillery units and the Communist Hainan Independent Column, he launched an amphibious assault on Hainan Island in April 1950. Despite lacking naval and air support, Deng conducted a large-scale landing using wooden sailing vessels in successive waves. His forces outflanked and defeated the Nationalist troops under Xue Yue, captured Haikou, and secured the island after Xue withdrew to Taiwan. The operation was the People's Liberation Army's first successful large-scale amphibious landing campaign.

=== Korean War ===
In July 1950, Deng was appointed first deputy commander of the Chinese People's Volunteer Army (CPV), becoming Marshal Peng Dehuai's principal deputy in preparation for China's intervention in the Korean War. According to political scientist Suisheng Zhao, Deng and Hong Xuezhi were among the senior commanders who concluded that the advance of United Nations forces towards the Yalu River posed a direct threat to China and advocated military intervention. Following the CPV's entry into Korea in October 1950, Deng served as first deputy commander and first deputy political commissar, assisting Peng in directing the first through fifth campaigns against United Nations forces. In July 1951, he represented the CPV during the armistice negotiations. As the negotiations reached an impasse, Deng proposed revisions to the planned Sixth Campaign, which were subsequently approved by Mao Zedong. During the subsequent United Nations autumn offensive, he directed CPV operations that halted the offensive and stabilized the front.

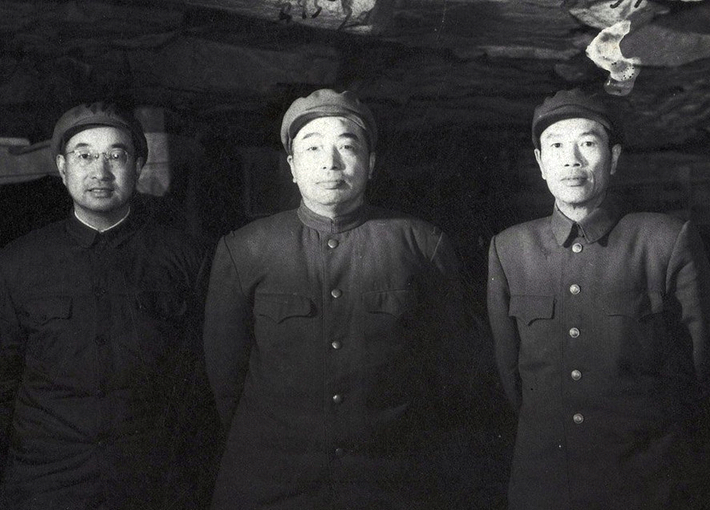
Deng (right) with Peng Dehuai (center) and Chen Geng at the Chinese People's Volunteer Army's headquarters in North Korea (1954)

While inspecting front-line positions in February 1952, Deng was injured during a United States air attack after his vehicle plunged into a ravine and was evacuated to Shenyang for medical treatment. After Peng returned to China in June 1952, Deng assumed the posts of acting commander and acting political commissar of the CPV, overseeing major operations including the Battle of Triangle Hill and the 1953 Summer Offensive. Following the signing of the Korean Armistice Agreement, he was formally appointed commander and political commissar of the CPV on 5 September 1954. During the armistice negotiations during the Korean War, Deng proposed using the existing line of contact, rather than the 38th parallel, as the military demarcation line to resolve a deadlock over the border. After receiving the approval of Mao Zedong and Kim Il-sung, the proposal was adopted by the Chinese and North Korean delegation and was subsequently accepted by the United Nations Command. According to Chinese sources, the proposal helped break the impasse in the negotiations and contributed to the conclusion of the armistice.

== Later years ==
After returning to China in 1954, Deng served as first deputy commander and acting commander of the Northeast Military Region, deputy chief of the General Staff of the People's Liberation Army and commander of the Shenyang Military Region. He was awarded the rank of shangjiang (general) in 1955 and was elected to the Central Committee at the Eighth National Congress of the Chinese Communist Party in 1956. Later that year, he led a Chinese military delegation on official visits to Yugoslavia and Bulgaria. In 1959, Deng was removed from his military posts because of his association with Peng Dehuai following the Lushan Conference. He was transferred to Sichuan as vice governor, where he remained under political surveillance despite attempts to seek a formal review of his case. During the Cultural Revolution, Deng was repeatedly detained, subjected to struggle sessions, and persecuted by factions associated with Lin Biao and the Gang of Four. In 1968, after Jiang Qing and Kang Sheng publicly denounced him, his persecution intensified. Despite this, he remained an alternate member of the Party's Central Committee and returned to military service in 1977 as deputy director of the People's Liberation Army Academy of Military Sciences. He was fully rehabilitated by the Chinese Communist Party in May 1980.

Deng died in Shanghai due to illness on 3 July 1980, aged 70. Following his death, the Chinese Communist Party Central Committee issued an official assessment describing Deng as "loyal to the Party and the people" who had upheld the Party's line and served as an outstanding Party member, political worker and military commander. On 10 July 1980, Deng's high-profile memorial service was held at the Babaoshan Revolutionary Cemetery in Beijing and the ceremony was hosted by Defense Minister Geng Biao, with the official eulogy delivered by Wei Guoqing. The service was attended in person by key leaders including Li Xiannian, Hu Yaobang and Zhao Ziyang, while top figures like Deng Xiaoping, Hua Guofeng and Ye Jianying sent wreaths.

== Personal life ==
In December 1937, Deng married Li Yuzhi, who was then serving as a soldier in the Eighth Route Army. The couple had two sons and four daughters.

== Awards and honors ==
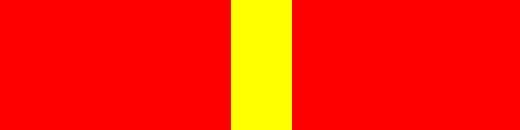
- Order of August 1 (1st Class Medal) (1955)
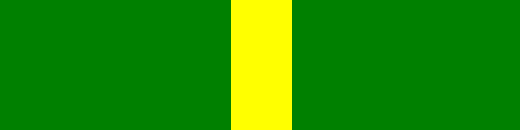
- Order of Independence and Freedom (1st Class Medal) (1955)
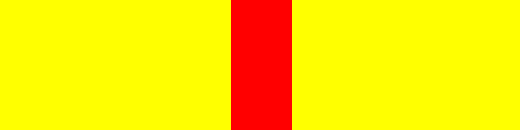
- Order of Liberation (1st Class Medal) (1955)
- Order of the National Flag (1st Class Medal) (North Korea)

Deng Hua's legacy is commemorated in his native Beihu District in Chenzhou, which hosts his former residence and a dedicated memorial hall.
