= Yingcheng (disambiguation) =

Yingcheng may refer to these places in China:

- Yingcheng, a county-level city in Xiaogan, Hubei
- Yingcheng, Jingzhou, a town in Jingzhou District, Jingzhou, Hubei
- Yingcheng Subdistrict, Changchun, Jilin
- Yingcheng Subdistrict, Yingde, Guangdong
