= Songhuajiang =

Songhuajiang (松花江) could refer to the following locations in China:

- Songhua River, sometimes rendered by its pinyin name as "Songhuajiang"; major river in the Northeast
- Harbin Railway Station, formerly known as Songhuajiang Railway Station
- Songhuajiang Subdistrict (松花江街道), Nangang District, Harbin
- Songhuajiang, Dehui (松花江镇), town in Jilin
- Songhuajiang Township (松花江乡), Bayan County, Heilongjiang
