= Daxing Township, Heishan County =

Daxing Township 大兴乡
- Township
- Location in Liaoning
- Coordinates: 41°38′50″N 122°20′32″E
- Country: People's Republic of China
- Province: Liaoning
- Prefecture-level city: Jinzhou
- County: Heishan County
- Time zone: UTC+8 (China Standard)

Daxing Township (simplified Chinese: 大兴乡; traditional Chinese: 大興鄉; pinyin: Dàxīng Xiāng) is a township under the administration of Heishan County, Liaoning, China. As of 2018, it has eight villages under its administration.
