= Lijia, Heishan County =

Lijia 励家镇
- Town
- Location in Liaoning
- Coordinates: 41°43′56″N 122°21′5″E
- Country: People's Republic of China
- Province: Liaoning
- Prefecture-level city: Jinzhou
- County: Heishan County
- Time zone: UTC+8 (China Standard)

Lijia (Chinese: 励家; pinyin: Lìjiā) is a town in Heishan County, Liaoning province, China. As of 2020, it administers the following 13 villages:

- Lijia Village (励家村)
- Lijia Village (李家村)
- Jiajia Village (贾家村)
- Loujia Village (娄家村)
- Pingfang Village (平房村)
- Guangsheng Village (广盛村)
- Shuanggangzi Village (双岗子村)
- Yanjia Village (晏家村)
- Cuigangzi Village (崔岗子村)
- Qianxing Village (前邢村)
- Dasunjia Village (大孙家村)
- Heiyutou Village (黑鱼头村)
- Zhaijia Village (翟家村)
