= Heishan County =

Heishan 黑山县
- County
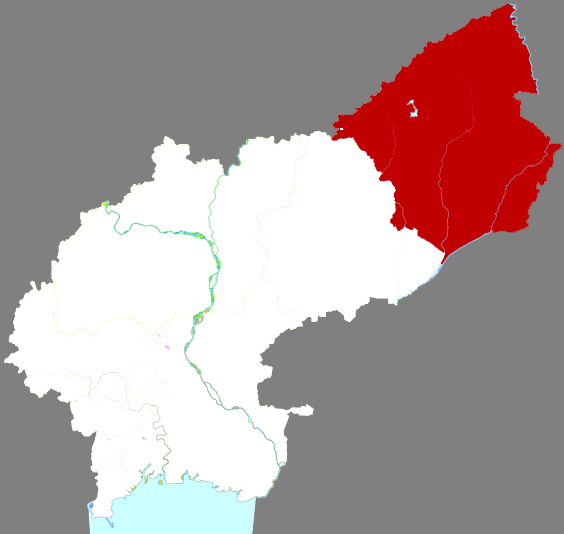
- Location in Jinzhou City

- Location of the seat in Liaoning
- Coordinates: 41°42′N 122°07′E
- Country: People's Republic of China
- Province: Liaoning
- Prefecture-level city: Jinzhou

Area
  - Total: 2,515 km^{2} (971 sq mi)
- Elevation: 23 m (75 ft)

Population (2020 census)
  - Total: 451,206
  - Density: 179.4/km^{2} (464.7/sq mi)
- Time zone: UTC+8 (China Standard)
- Postal code: 121400
- Area code: 0416

Heishan (Chinese: 黑山; pinyin: Hēishān; lit. 'black mountain') is a county of north-central Liaoning, People's Republic of China. It is under the administration and occupies the northeastern corner of Jinzhou City.

== Administrative divisions ==
There are 17 towns, six townships, and two ethnic townships in the county.

Towns:

- Xinlitun, Heishan (黑山镇), Badaohao (八道壕镇), Xiaodong (小东镇), Dahushan (大虎山镇), Wuliangdian (无梁殿镇), Baichangmen (白厂门镇), Banlamen (半拉门镇), Sijiazi (四家子镇), Fangshan (芳山镇), Lijia (励家镇), Hujia (胡家镇), Jiangtun (姜屯镇), Raoyanghe (绕阳河镇), Changxing (常兴镇), Xinxing (新兴镇)

Townships:

- Daxing Township (大兴乡), LIuhe Township (六合乡), Taihe Township (太和乡), Yingchengzi Township (英城子乡), Duanjia Township (段家乡), Xuetun Township (薛屯乡), Situn Manchu Ethnic Township (司屯满族乡), Zhen'an Manchu Ethnic Township (镇安满族乡)

== Climate ==
Heishan has a monsoon-influenced humid continental climate (Köppen Dwa), characterised by hot, humid summers and long, cold and windy, but dry winters. The four seasons here are distinctive. A majority of the annual rainfall of 571 mm (22.5 in) occurs in July and August alone. The monthly 24-hour average temperature ranges from −10.0 °C (14.0 °F) in January to 24.0 °C (75.2 °F) in July, and the annual mean is 8.32 °C (47.0 °F). The frost-free period lasts an average 160 days.

Climate data for Heishan, elevation 38 m (125 ft), (1991–2020 normals, extremes 1971–present)
Month	Jan	Feb	Mar	Apr	May	Jun	Jul	Aug	Sep	Oct	Nov	Dec	Year
Record high °C (°F)	8.3 (46.9)	14.7 (58.5)	19.6 (67.3)	29.6 (85.3)	36.2 (97.2)	37.4 (99.3)	37.5 (99.5)	35.7 (96.3)	33.5 (92.3)	30.6 (87.1)	19.8 (67.6)	12.0 (53.6)	37.5 (99.5)
Mean daily maximum °C (°F)	−3.5 (25.7)	1.0 (33.8)	8.0 (46.4)	16.8 (62.2)	23.8 (74.8)	27.1 (80.8)	28.9 (84.0)	28.6 (83.5)	24.8 (76.6)	16.8 (62.2)	6.1 (43.0)	−1.7 (28.9)	14.7 (58.5)
Daily mean °C (°F)	−9.8 (14.4)	−5.3 (22.5)	1.7 (35.1)	10.3 (50.5)	17.6 (63.7)	21.9 (71.4)	24.4 (75.9)	23.4 (74.1)	18.0 (64.4)	10.2 (50.4)	0.4 (32.7)	−7.4 (18.7)	8.8 (47.8)
Mean daily minimum °C (°F)	−14.8 (5.4)	−10.7 (12.7)	−3.9 (25.0)	4.2 (39.6)	11.6 (52.9)	17.0 (62.6)	20.4 (68.7)	19.1 (66.4)	12.1 (53.8)	4.4 (39.9)	−4.6 (23.7)	−12.2 (10.0)	3.5 (38.4)
Record low °C (°F)	−27.0 (−16.6)	−24.7 (−12.5)	−21.5 (−6.7)	−8.5 (16.7)	0.3 (32.5)	6.8 (44.2)	12.2 (54.0)	5.5 (41.9)	−0.6 (30.9)	−7.9 (17.8)	−19.0 (−2.2)	−25.1 (−13.2)	−27.0 (−16.6)
Average precipitation mm (inches)	2.9 (0.11)	3.3 (0.13)	9.1 (0.36)	27.3 (1.07)	46.3 (1.82)	78.0 (3.07)	151.1 (5.95)	138.8 (5.46)	46.3 (1.82)	32.0 (1.26)	14.8 (0.58)	3.4 (0.13)	553.3 (21.76)
Average precipitation days (≥ 0.1 mm)	2.0	1.7	3.1	5.1	7.9	10.5	10.3	9.4	6.0	5.1	3.4	2.2	66.7
Average snowy days	2.9	3.1	2.9	0.9	0	0	0	0	0	0.4	2.9	3.0	16.1
Average relative humidity (%)	54	50	48	50	55	71	82	82	72	63	59	57	62
Mean monthly sunshine hours	204.0	205.7	246.5	243.3	267.4	230.2	203.3	222.4	234.2	216.5	181.8	184.0	2,639.3
Percentage possible sunshine	69	68	66	61	59	51	44	52	63	64	62	65	60
Source 1: China Meteorological Administration October all-time Record
Source 2: Weather China
