= Battle of Siping =

1946 battle of the Chinese Civil War

- Part of the Chinese Civil War
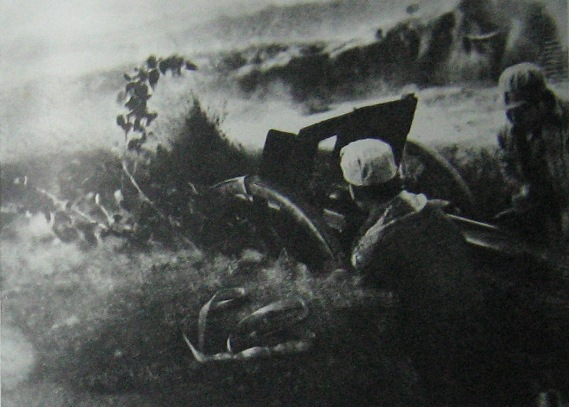
- Communist troops bombard Nationalist positions with artillery
Date	March 15–17, 1946
Location	Siping, Jilin, China
Result	Communist victory

Belligerents
China	Chinese Communist Party

Commanders and leaders
Liu Handong	Li Tianyou; Wan Yi

Strength
3,000	6,000

Casualties and losses
3,000	235

The Battle of Siping (四平战斗), also known as the Battle to Liberate Siping (四平解放战), was fought between the Communist forces and the Nationalist forces in the northern province of Jilin, China for the control of the city of Siping during the Chinese Civil War. It took place immediately after the Soviet Red Army withdrew from Siping in March 1946, and resulted in a Communist victory.

== Prelude ==
On January 8, 1946, Liu Handong (刘瀚东), the commander of the Nationalist 107th Division, arrived at Siping with over a hundred associates to discuss the city's transfer from the Soviet Red Army to the Chinese administration. The Red Army still occupied the city at the time. Subsequently, on January 10, the Nationalists created the Liaobei province, with Liu Handong named the chairman of the province, and Nationalist provincial governmental member Li Chongguo (李充国) named the mayor of Siping.

The Nationalists had neither sufficient troops nor enough transportation assets to effectively assume control of the previously Japanese-occupied region of China, and they could not spare enough forces to hold the city long enough for reinforcements to arrive. The Nationalists at Siping recruited bandits in the region, including members from the Good Under the Heaven (天下好) and Flying Over the Grass (草上飞) gangs, to secure the local garrison.

Enlisting the gangs angered the local populace, which already blamed the Nationalists for losing the region to the Japanese invaders. As a result, the Nationalists lost popular support in the region, a problem exacerbated by the fact that the hired bandits had fought the Nationalists both prior to and during the war and had cooperated with the Japanese invaders. The Nationalists recruited forces from the former Japanese puppet regime Manchukuo, such as the Iron Stone Units (Tie Shi Bu Dui, 铁石部队), to be part of the local garrison, which only increased the hatred from the local populace, which had suffered under the Japanese puppet regime.

== First Nationalist offensive and counterattack ==
On January 25, 1946, Lü Zhengcao, the commander-in-chief of the communist Western Manchurian Military District, and Li Fuchun, the political commissar of the communist Western Manchurian Military District, redeployed the communist 10th Brigade and the 24th Brigade to the Pear Tree (Li Shu, 梨树), Changtu, and Gongzhuling regions surrounding Siping.

In an attempt to eradicate the enemy and secure the city, the Nationalists launched an offensive against the Communists in late February. However, the former bandits proved no match for combat-hardened Communists who were veterans of the Second Sino-Japanese War. The Nationalist force, consisting of former bandits from the Pressuring Nine Dragons (Ya Jiu Long, 压九龙) gang, attacked the communist Siping Group and inflicted more than a dozen fatalities and injured a Communist squadron commander, Cheng Bizhen (程秉贞). The Communists quickly counterattacked, completely annihilating the attacking Nationalists.

The failed attempt by the Nationalists provided an excellent excuse for the Communists to counterattack, and, in a short period of several days, the Nationalist strongholds at Crouching Tiger Village (Wo Hu Tun, 卧虎屯), Maolin (茂林), Baokang (保康), and Twin Mountains (Shuang Shan, 双山) fell into Communist hands. All the Nationalist garrisons guarding these strongholds were former bandits from various gangs, including the Old Second Brother (Lao Er Ge, 老二哥), Seven Stars (Qi Xing Zi, 七星子), Old Man Smile (Lao Tou Le, 老头乐) and Nine Provinces (Jiu Sheng, 九省) gangs. The Nationalists were forced back on the defensive after their failure in the rural regions and the fighting temporarily stopped.

== Communist capture of Siping ==
The clash resumed after the Soviet Red Army withdrew from Siping on March 13, 1946. On March 15, the airport in the western suburb of the city had fallen into Communist hands, and by the next day, the 6,000-strong Communist force had completed their siege of the city. At 4:00 a.m. on March 17, the assault on the city began. After ten hours of fierce battle, the city succumbed, with its entire garrison defeated.

The Nationalist commander Liu Handong and his deputies, the former bandit chieftains Wang Dahua (王大化) and Wang Yaodong (王耀东) were captured alive. However, a few of the defenders, including the Nationalist chief of security Zhang Dongkai (张东凯) and deputy chief of security Wang Yongqing (王永清), were able to escape by disguising themselves as beggars. The Communists had also captured 69 machine guns, 32 artillery pieces, over two thousand firearms, nearly two dozen automobiles, over 300 military horses and large amount of supplies from the Nationalist defenders. The Nationalists lost support from the local populace as a result of the defeat.

== Nationalist counter-offensive ==
Chiang Kai-shek was furious that the city had fallen and sent out a force to retake the city. By March 21, 1946, the Nationalists had taken nearby Liaoyang, and by March 22, the Nationalists took Fushun and Tieling. On March 22, Chiang Kai-shek ordered Xiong Shihui (熊式辉), the chief Nationalist administrator in Northeast China and Zheng Dongguo, the commander-in-chief of the Nationalist force in Northeast China, to launch a counter-offensive targeting Siping from the provincial capital of Shenyang. The goal was to take Siping before April 2. The Nationalist offensive was spearheaded by the New 1st Army and the 71st Army, and the Nationalist deputy commander-in-chief Liang Huasheng (梁华盛) was named as the frontline commander to set up headquarters at Tieling.

Chiang's plan collapsed when melting snow turned the roads to mud, bogging down the highly mechanized Nationalist force, making it unable to reach Siping. The Nationalists would also suffer another defeat in the Jinjiatun Campaign due to the harsh terrain which was hostile to the highly mechanized force.

== See also ==
- Outline of the Chinese Civil War
- National Revolutionary Army
- History of the People's Liberation Army
