= Summer Offensive of 1947 in Northeast China =

Part of the Chinese Civil War

- Part of Chinese Civil War
Date	May 13, 1947 – July 1, 1947
Location	Northeast China
Result	Communist victory

Belligerents
National Revolutionary Army	Eighth Route Army

Commanders and leaders
Du Yuming; Xiong Shihui; Chen Cheng	Lin Biao; Luo Ronghuan

Strength
480,000	460,000

Casualties and losses
82,000	Unknown

The Summer Offensive of 1947 in Northeast China (东北1947年夏季攻势) is a series of battles initiated by the communists against the nationalists during the Chinese Civil War after World War II.

== Prelude ==
In the spring of 1947, the nationalist tried and failed to eliminate communist bases south of Songhua River in the Linjiang Campaign, and both side temporarily stopped military actions for a brief period of rest before resuming the fight. The total strength of the nationalists in northeast China by then had numbered 480,000, including eight armies totaling twenty-three divisions, along with independent divisions totaling 360,000 troops, and security forces of a further 120,000. In contrast, the total strength of the communists in northeast China numbered 460,000, including five columns with fifteen divisions, and another eleven independent divisions, totaling 240,000 troops, and these units of the communist field army were supplemented by other local garrison units which numbered 220,000 troops.

== Strategies ==
Nationalist Strategy: The nationalist strategy was to consolidate its area of control by continuing the separation of the different communist bases in the north, east, west and south, and when there was enough reinforcement arrived from China proper, launching another renewed offensive against the enemy. The Newly Organized 1st Army, the 71st Army and the 54th Division of the 13th Army were tasked to man the defensive line along the Jilin City, Dehui (德惠), Nong’an (农安), Shuangshan (双山), and Tongliao, 4th Division of the 13th Army and the 93rd Army (without its 20th Division) were tasked to protect the communication line between Rehe and northeast China, the 52nd Army, the 60th Army, the 20th Division of the 93rd Army, and the 207th Division of the Youth Army were deployed at Shenyang and its regions to east and south of the city, later boosted by the newly arrived 53rd Army. The Newly Organized 6th Army deployed between Benxi and Anshan would act as mobile strike force.

Communist Strategy: The communists planned their offensives at two fronts. In the north, the 1st Column and the 2nd Column would attempt to control the regions between Changchun and Siping (city) with the help of the 1st and the 2nd Independent Divisions, and then would strike south of Siping (city). In the south, the 3rd Column, the 10th Division of the 4th Column and the Southern Manchurian 2nd Independent Division would attack Mountain City (Shancheng Zhen, 山城镇), and Grass City (Cao Shi, 草市), and then push toward Siping (city) from Meihekou (梅河口). The Western and Eastern Manchurian Independent Divisions would strike toward Village of the Zheng Family (Zhengjia Tun, 郑家屯) and regions east of Jilin City, and the goal was to take more urban centers from the enemy.

== Order of battle ==
Nationalist order of battle:

- The Newly Organized 1st Army
- The Newly Organized 6th Army
- The 13th Army
- The 52nd Army
- The 53rd Army
- The 60th Army
- The 71st Army
- The 93rd Army
- The 38th Division
- The 2nd Division of the Youth Army
- The 207th Division of the Youth Army

Communist order of battle:

- The 1st Column
- The 2nd Column
- The 3rd Column
- The 4th Column
- The 6th Column
- The Independent 1st Division
- The Independent 2nd Division
- The Independent 3rd Division
- The Eastern Manchurian Independent Division
- The Southern Manchurian 2nd Independent Division
- The Western Manchurian 3rd Independent Division
- The Two cavalry divisions

== First stage ==
From their base in Fuyu (扶余) and Dalai (大赉), the communist 1st Column, 2nd Column, Independent 1st Division, Independent 2nd Division struck south to the west of Changchun. On May 13, 1947, the communist 4th Division of the 2nd Column suddenly besieged Huaide (怀德), while the communist 5th Division of the 2nd Column was deployed to the south of the besieged town to stop any nationalist reinforcement from Siping (city). In the meantime, the communist 1st Column and the Independent 1st Division ambushed the nationalist reinforcement from Changchun on the eastern bank of Xinkai River (新开河), while the communist Western Manchurian Independent 3rd Division launched its offensives on Glass Mountain (Boli Shan, 玻璃山) and Twin Mountain (Shuang Shan, 双山) to the north of Village of the Zheng Family (Zhengjia Tun, 郑家屯), thus tying up the local nationalist garrison, the 87th Division of the 71st Army.

On May 17, 1947, the communist 4th Division and the 6th Division of the 2nd Column succeeded in taking Huaide (怀德) after completely annihilating the local nationalist garrison, the 90th Regiment of the 30th Division of the Newly Organized 1st Army and the 17th Security Regiment. Learning the news of the fall of Huaide (怀德), the two nationalist forces sent out for reinforcement attempted to withdraw, and the communists took this opportunity to further expand their victory by attempting to destroy more enemy units and the main force of the nationalist 71st Army became the unfortunate victim. The 88th Division and the 91st Division of the nationalist 71st Army sent out from Siping (city) for reinforcement managed to successfully retreated to Greater Black Forest (Daheilinzi, 大黑林子) region, where they were caught up by the communist 1st Column and the 2nd Column that were sent out to chase them. After twelve hours of fierce battle, the 88th Division was completely wiped out and so was the majority part of the 91st Division.

Capitalizing on their victories, the communist 1st Column took several towns abandoned by the nationalists, including Princess Ridge (公主岭), Motel of the Guo Family (Guojia Dian, 郭家店), Village of the Tao Family (Taojia Tun, 陶家屯), while the communist 2nd Column took Changtu (昌图) after completely wiping out the two nationalist regiments that defended the city. On the other front in the south, with the help of the communist Southern Manchurian 2nd Independent Division, the communist 3rd Column took two towns on May 14, 1947: Mountain City (Shancheng Zhen, 山城镇), and Grass City (Cao Shi, 草市), after annihilating the local nationalist defenders consisted of a regiment of the 184th Division of the 60th Army and units of the 20th Army, thus succeeded in cutting off the railway link between Shenyang and Jilin. In the east, the 18th Division of the communist 6th Column and the communist Independent 3rd Division took the strategic locations of Sky Mountain (Tian Gang, 天岗) and Jiangmi Peak (江密峰) in the east of Jilin City, after annihilating the nationalist 7th Security Regiment defending the regions.

After the railway link had been cut, the nationalists hastily launched a counterattack in attempt to reopen the link by sending out six regiments and the Newly Organized 22nd Division. However, the hastily organized counteroffensive was disorganized and was not launched in unison, but in separate phases and thus could not achieve the concentration of force, providing the enemy with the opportunity to attack one at a time. The first of these nationalist forces, the six regiments belonged to two different brigades and regiment of one brigade had difficult time taking orders from the headquarters of the other brigade, and as a result, the communist 3rd Column and the 10th Division of the communist 4th Column were able to completely wipe out all of the six nationalist regiments in two days period, from May 16, 1947, thru May 17, 1947. After destroying the six nationalist regiments, the communist force then turned around and badly mauled the nationalist Newly Organized 22nd Division. The failure of the nationalist counterattack resulted in complete isolation of the strategic stronghold of Meihekou (梅河口).

== Second stage ==
After regrouping, the communists deployed a regiment from the 9th Division of the 3rd Column, a regiment of the 7th Division of the 3rd Column, and the 10th Division of the 4th Column to besiege Meihekou (梅河口) on May 22, 1947. After fierce fighting of 5 days, the stronghold fell into the communist hands. The defender of Meihekou (梅河口), the nationalist 184th Division, was completely annihilated, with the commander of the Division captured alive by the communists, along with more than 6,000 of his troops. Capitalizing on the victory, the communist 3rd Column begun its westward push along the railway of Siping (city), badly mauling the 2nd Division of the Youth Army, the local nationalist defender on the way.

In the east, the communist Eastern Manchurian Independent Division and the communist 6th Column annihilated a regiment of the Newly Organized 38th Division at Old Master Ridge (Laoye Lin, 老爷岭) and Little Plentiful (Xiaofengman, 小丰满) regions, and thus forced the nationalist 21st Division of the 60th Army, the local garrison at Sea Dragon (Hailong, 海龙) to abandon the town and fled north. However, the fleeing nationalists were intercepted by the communist 6th Column, Eastern Manchurian Independent Division, the 1st Independent Division and 2nd Independent Division at the Peaceful River (Taipingchuan, 太平川) region. By June 3, 1947, the last remnant of the nationalist 21st Division of the 60th Army was annihilated at the town of Jichang (吉昌). By this time, the communists had managed to successfully eradicate nationalist from regions south of Jilin City and Changchun, and east of Siping (city), controlling the region between Changchun and Shenyang. The communists also gained control of important railway sections including the central section of the railway between Shenyang and Jilin, and the eastern part of the railway between Meihekou (梅河口) and Siping (city).

In the south, the communist 11th Division and 12th Division of the 4th Column opened another front along with the communist Southern Manchurian 1st Independent Division, succeeded in taking cities/towns including Tonghua (通化), (Xinbin) 新宾, Kuandian (宽甸), Zhuanghe (庄河), Fu County (复县), Gaiping (盖平), Greater Stone Bridge (Dashiqiao, 大石桥), joining the two separate communist bases in the south and east into one. In conjunctions with the main battle in the south, seven communist brigades further down south in Chahar and Rehe regions struck toward the central sections of Jinzhou and Chengde, cutting off the important railway communication line, and taking Weichang (围场), Chifeng, Beipiao, Changli (昌黎), Funing (抚宁) and other areas.

== Third Stage ==
After a series of earlier defeats, the nationalists changed their strategy by focusing on defending the strategic major cities such as Changchun, Shenyang and Siping, and both sides set their sights on Siping, the traffic hub of northeast China. The nationalist divided the city into five defensive zones, tasking the 71st Army and the 54th Division of the 13th Army as the main defenders. The communists massed the 1st Column, the 17th Division of the 6th Column, and the Western Manchurian 3rd Independent Division to assault the city, while four columns totaling 10 Division, 5 independent Divisions, and 2 cavalry Divisions were deployed to the north and south of the city to stop any enemy reinforcement.

On June 14, 1947, the communist assault begun and the communist 1st Column and the Western Manchurian 3rd Independent Division penetrated into the city. On June 19, 1947, the communist 17th Division of the 6th Column joined the fight and only the Iron East (Tiedong, 铁东) Precinct remained in the nationalist hands. The nationalist commanders realized the token force sent to reinforce Siping (city) was not enough so he changed his tactic by sending additional forces, totaling ten divisions from Changchun and Shenyang, including 2 divisions from the nationalist 52nd Division newly arrived Shenyang from China proper. On June 24, 1947, two nationalist Divisions sent from Changchun were stopped at the Village of the Tao Family (Taojia Tun, 陶家屯).

When the communists learned that another eight nationalist divisions sent from Shenyang were pushing toward Siping (city) in three fronts parallel to the railway, the communists changed their strategy. Instead of attempting to gain the control of the city, it was decided to kill as many enemy troops as possible so the attack on Siping was stopped and a total of nine communist divisions were gathered to face the nationalist Newly Organized 6th Army at the right. On June 29, 1947, the communist force managed to inflict heavy damage on its target, with the 169th Division and the 22nd Division of the nationalist Newly Organized 6th Army were completely wiped out at the Sable Skin Village (Diaopi Tun, 貂皮屯) and Weiyuan Bunker (Weiyuan Bao, 威远堡) regions, while the 14th Division of the Newly Organized 6th Army lost an entire regiment at Lotus Street (Lianhua Jie, 莲花街) region. After achieving these successes, the communists realized that it was impossible to further expand their victories against the technologically and numerically superior opponent, and ended the campaign on July 1, 1947.

== Outcome ==
During the fifty-day long campaign, communist succeeded in taking forty-two cities and towns from its opponent, and annihilated over 82,000 enemy troops in the process. The previously separated communist bases in the north and south have been successfully linked up as a result, and the offensive helped the communist campaigns in China proper. The communist victory also provided the foundation for the next communist offensive, the Autumn Offensive of 1947 in Northeast China. The nationalists were forced to be on the defensive along the railways from Shenyang to Greater Stone Bridge (Dashiqiao, 大石桥), and from Shenyang to Shanhai Pass, but still managed to hold on to some strategic cities.

== See also ==
- Outline of the Chinese Civil War
- National Revolutionary Army
- History of the People's Liberation Army
