= Jiutai, Changchun =

Jiutai 九台区
- District
- Location in Jilin Jiutai (China)
- Coordinates: 44°09′04″N 125°50′38″E
- Country: People's Republic of China
- Province: Jilin
- Sub-provincial city: Changchun

Area
  - Total: 2,857 km^{2} (1,103 sq mi)

Population (2010)
  - Total: 611,670
  - Density: 214.1/km^{2} (554.5/sq mi)
- Time zone: UTC+8 (China Standard)
- Postal code: 1305XX

Jiutai (Chinese: 九台; pinyin: Jiǔtái; lit. 'nine platforms') is one of seven districts of the prefecture-level city of Changchun, the capital of Jilin Province, Northeast China. The district is surrounded by agricultural areas and is located around 50 kilometres (31 mi) northeast of downtown Changchun. Coal mining also is present in Jiutai. It borders Dehui to the north, Erdao District to the southwest, Kuancheng District to the west, as well as the prefecture-level city of Jilin to the south and east.

== Administrative divisions ==
There are five subdistricts, nine towns, and two ethnic townships.

Subdistricts:

- Tuanjie Subdistrict (团结街道), Gongnong Subdistrict (工农街道), Nanshan Subdistrict (南山街道), Yingcheng Subdistrict (营城街道), Huoshiling Subdistrict (火石岭街道)

Towns:

- Tumenling (土们岭镇), Xiyingcheng (西营城镇), Mushihe (沐石河镇), Qitamu (其塔木镇), Shanghewan (上河湾镇), Yinmahe (饮马河镇), Chengzijie (城子街镇), Xinglong (兴隆镇), Weizigou (苇子沟镇)

Townships:

- Hujia Hui Ethnic Township (胡家回族乡), Mangka Manchu Ethnic Township (莽卡满族乡)

== Climate ==
Climate data for Jiutai, elevation 174 m (571 ft), (1991–2020 normals, extremes 1981–present)
Month	Jan	Feb	Mar	Apr	May	Jun	Jul	Aug	Sep	Oct	Nov	Dec	Year
Record high °C (°F)	4.5 (40.1)	13.5 (56.3)	21.4 (70.5)	29.7 (85.5)	34.4 (93.9)	37.8 (100.0)	36.2 (97.2)	34.9 (94.8)	30.9 (87.6)	28.3 (82.9)	21.7 (71.1)	11.6 (52.9)	37.8 (100.0)
Mean daily maximum °C (°F)	−9.5 (14.9)	−4.0 (24.8)	4.5 (40.1)	14.9 (58.8)	22.1 (71.8)	26.8 (80.2)	28.3 (82.9)	27.1 (80.8)	22.4 (72.3)	13.7 (56.7)	2.0 (35.6)	−7.3 (18.9)	11.7 (53.2)
Daily mean °C (°F)	−15.6 (3.9)	−10.4 (13.3)	−1.4 (29.5)	8.5 (47.3)	16.0 (60.8)	21.4 (70.5)	23.7 (74.7)	22.1 (71.8)	16.0 (60.8)	7.5 (45.5)	−3.3 (26.1)	−12.7 (9.1)	6.0 (42.8)
Mean daily minimum °C (°F)	−20.7 (−5.3)	−16.2 (2.8)	−7.0 (19.4)	2.2 (36.0)	10.1 (50.2)	16.4 (61.5)	19.5 (67.1)	17.8 (64.0)	10.3 (50.5)	2.0 (35.6)	−7.9 (17.8)	−17.4 (0.7)	0.8 (33.4)
Record low °C (°F)	−37.9 (−36.2)	−37.4 (−35.3)	−24.5 (−12.1)	−11.9 (10.6)	−2.2 (28.0)	5.6 (42.1)	10.5 (50.9)	7.8 (46.0)	−2.0 (28.4)	−14.2 (6.4)	−24.5 (−12.1)	−35.1 (−31.2)	−37.9 (−36.2)
Average precipitation mm (inches)	4.5 (0.18)	4.8 (0.19)	11.8 (0.46)	22.9 (0.90)	60.0 (2.36)	97.1 (3.82)	144.7 (5.70)	122.5 (4.82)	50.6 (1.99)	24.3 (0.96)	16.1 (0.63)	7.2 (0.28)	566.5 (22.29)
Average precipitation days (≥ 0.1 mm)	4.4	4.2	5.2	6.4	11.5	13.6	13.9	12.7	8.0	7.2	5.9	6.1	99.1
Average snowy days	6.9	5.7	6.4	2.1	0.1	0	0	0	0.1	1.6	6.2	8.3	37.4
Average relative humidity (%)	67	61	54	48	54	65	77	79	71	62	64	68	64
Mean monthly sunshine hours	159.2	185.4	219.6	218.5	239.9	238.2	226.2	224.9	226.5	194.8	155.1	143.0	2,431.3
Percentage possible sunshine	55	62	59	54	52	52	49	52	61	58	54	52	55
Source: China Meteorological Administration All-time Oct extreme
