= Songhuajiang, Jilin =

Songhuajiang 松花江
- Town
- Location within Jilin province
- Coordinates: 44°42′57″N 125°57′16″E
- Country: China
- Province (China): Jilin
- Prefecture: Changchun
- County-level city: Dehui

Area
  - Total: 165 km^{2} (64 sq mi)

Population (2011)
  - Total: 42,000
  - Density: 250/km^{2} (660/sq mi)
- Time zone: UTC+8 (China Standard Time)

Songhuajiang (Chinese: 松花江; pinyin: Sōnghuājiāng) is a town in the city of Dehui, in the north of Jilin Province in Northeast China. The town lies on the southern bank of the Songhua River and is located 28 kilometres (17 mi) north-northeast of Dehui. With a population of 42,000 (as of 2011) and an area of 165 square kilometres (64 sq mi), it borders the towns of Caiyuanzi (菜园子镇) to the north, Chalukou (岔路口镇) to the south, Yangshu (杨树镇) to the east, and Dajiagou (达家沟镇) to the west. The town seat is in Songhuajiang Village (松花江村).

The area has good transportation links, with the Hada Railway (Harbin–Dalian) and the Jingha Expressway (Beijing–Harbin) nearby.
