= Jinxi County =

Jinxi County 金溪县 Kinki; Chinchi
- County
- Jinxi County
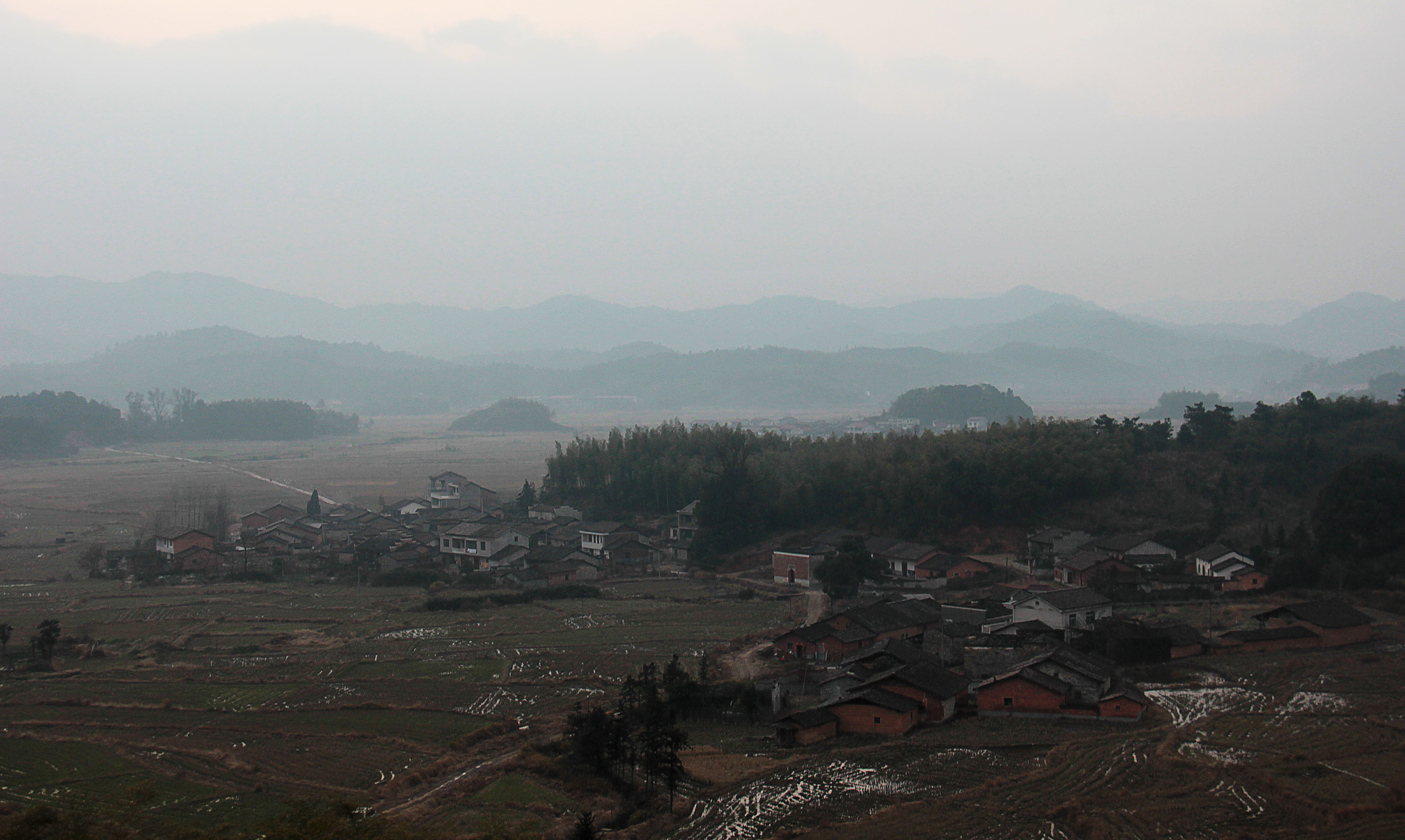

- Coordinates: 27°54′N 116°45′E
- Country: People's Republic of China
- Province: Jiangxi
- Prefecture-level city: Fuzhou

Area
  - Total: 1,353 km^{2} (522 sq mi)

Population (2019)
  - Total: 306,700
  - Density: 226.7/km^{2} (587.1/sq mi)
- Time zone: UTC+8 (China Standard)
- Postal Code: 344800

Jinxi County (simplified Chinese: 金溪县; traditional Chinese: 金溪縣; pinyin: Jīnxī Xiàn) is a county of Jiangxi in the People's Republic of China. It is under the jurisdiction of the prefecture-level city of Fuzhou.

Jinxi is the hometown of Lu Xiangshan (陆象山), a famous educator and thinker in the Southern Song Dynasty. He was highly honored in Chinese history as well as one of China's top ten thinkers. Jinxi has nurtured many famous figures, including Wei Su (危素), a famous historian in the Yuan Dynasty, Gong Tingxian (龚廷贤), a great medical scientist in the Ming Dynasty and Cai Shangxiang (蔡上翔), an outstanding scholar in the Qing Dynasty. Zhou Jianping (周建屏), the commander of the Red Tenth Army and one of the founders of Mingzhegan Revolution Base. It has boasted two zhuangyuan, three bangyan and 242 jinshi since Jinxi County was founded.

Jinxi is the core zone of Linchuan culture as well as a fundamental part of Gan culture. Jinxi County was founded in the fifth year of Chunhua of the Northern Song Dynasty (994 CE). Renowned for its silver smelting site in the Tang Dynasty, the output of gold and silver in the ancient time and the golden streams running through the mountains, it was named the "golden stream." Some silver smelting relic sites and relevant inscriptions which were the earliest physically written record in ancient China's mining and metallurgy have still remained in the county. It used to be an important pottery and porcelain production base in the Song Dynasty, so a folk saying goes, "First Xiaopi Kiln, then Jingdezhen."

== Administrative divisions ==
In the present, Jinxi County has 7 towns and 6 townships.

7 towns

- Xiugu (秀谷镇)
- Huwan (浒湾镇)
- Shuangtang (双塘镇)
- Heyuan (何源镇)
- Heshi (合市镇)
- Langju (琅琚镇)
- Zuofang (左坊镇)

6 townships

- Huangtong (黄通乡)
- Duiqiao (对桥乡)
- Lufang (陆坊乡)
- Chenfangji (陈坊积乡)
- Liuli (琉璃乡)
- Shimen (石门乡)

== Demographics ==
The population of the district was 605,100 as of 2010.

== Climate ==
Climate data for Jinxi, elevation 130 m (430 ft), (1991–2020 normals, extremes 1981–2010)
Month	Jan	Feb	Mar	Apr	May	Jun	Jul	Aug	Sep	Oct	Nov	Dec	Year
Record high °C (°F)	27.2 (81.0)	29.2 (84.6)	33.4 (92.1)	35.1 (95.2)	36.0 (96.8)	37.5 (99.5)	41.7 (107.1)	42.0 (107.6)	39.5 (103.1)	36.7 (98.1)	32.9 (91.2)	26.9 (80.4)	42.0 (107.6)
Mean daily maximum °C (°F)	10.1 (50.2)	13.5 (56.3)	17.4 (63.3)	23.8 (74.8)	28.1 (82.6)	30.5 (86.9)	34.4 (93.9)	33.9 (93.0)	30.1 (86.2)	25.0 (77.0)	19.0 (66.2)	12.8 (55.0)	23.2 (73.8)
Daily mean °C (°F)	6.1 (43.0)	8.9 (48.0)	12.7 (54.9)	18.7 (65.7)	23.2 (73.8)	26.2 (79.2)	29.5 (85.1)	28.7 (83.7)	25.0 (77.0)	19.8 (67.6)	14.0 (57.2)	8.1 (46.6)	18.4 (65.2)
Mean daily minimum °C (°F)	3.2 (37.8)	5.6 (42.1)	9.2 (48.6)	14.9 (58.8)	19.4 (66.9)	22.9 (73.2)	25.8 (78.4)	24.9 (76.8)	21.3 (70.3)	15.8 (60.4)	10.2 (50.4)	4.6 (40.3)	14.8 (58.7)
Record low °C (°F)	−6.0 (21.2)	−7.0 (19.4)	−2.4 (27.7)	3.1 (37.6)	9.4 (48.9)	14.0 (57.2)	19.2 (66.6)	19.4 (66.9)	13.5 (56.3)	3.0 (37.4)	−2.0 (28.4)	−11.1 (12.0)	−11.1 (12.0)
Average precipitation mm (inches)	101.9 (4.01)	112.1 (4.41)	228.4 (8.99)	221.4 (8.72)	268.2 (10.56)	355.7 (14.00)	176.0 (6.93)	140.5 (5.53)	85.9 (3.38)	58.2 (2.29)	104.4 (4.11)	77.9 (3.07)	1,930.6 (76)
Average precipitation days (≥ 0.1 mm)	14.9	14.2	19.2	17.6	17.1	16.7	11.1	13.0	9.9	8.6	11.1	11.7	165.1
Average snowy days	2.5	1.6	0.3	0	0	0	0	0	0	0	0	0.9	5.3
Average relative humidity (%)	82	80	81	78	78	80	72	76	79	77	79	79	78
Mean monthly sunshine hours	77.3	77.8	86.7	115.8	139.1	140.1	238.8	207.2	166.2	154.5	124.0	115.5	1,643
Percentage possible sunshine	24	24	23	30	33	34	57	51	46	44	39	36	37
Source: China Meteorological Administration
