= Yingcheng Subdistrict, Yingde =

Yingcheng Subdistrict 英城街道
- Subdistrict
- Interactive map of Yingcheng Subdistrict
- Location in Guangdong
- Coordinates: 24°11′8″N 113°23′52″E
- Country: People's Republic of China
- Province: Guangdong
- Prefecture-level city: Qingyuan
- County-level city: Yingde
- Established: 2nd Century B.C.

Government
  - Type: Subdistrict Office

Area
  - Total: 164.5 km^{2} (63.5 sq mi)

Dimensions
  - Length: 16.5 km (10.3 mi)
  - Width: 11 km (6.8 mi)

Population
  - Total: 169,318
  - Density: 1,029/km^{2} (2,666/sq mi)
- Time zone: UTC+8 (China Standard)
- Postal code: 513035
- Telephone Code: +86 (0)763

Yingcheng Subdistrict (Chinese: 英城街道; pinyin: Yīngchéng Jiēdào) is the main subdistrict of Yingde, Guangdong, China.As of 2020, it administers the following five residential neighborhoods and six villages:

- Chengzhong (城中)
- Chengnan (城南)
- Chengbei (城北)
- Chengxi (城西)
- Nanshan (南山)
- Baisha Village (白沙村)
- Aishanping Village (矮山坪村)
- Jiangwan Village (江湾村)
- Changling Village (长岭村)
- Yanqian Village (岩前村)
- Langbu Village (廊步村)

== See also ==
- List of township-level divisions of Guangdong
