= Yingcheng Subdistrict, Changchun =

Yingcheng Subdistrict 营城街道
- Subdistrict
- Location in Jilin
- Coordinates: 44°9′19″N 125°51′57″E
- Country: People's Republic of China
- Province: Jilin
- Prefecture-level city: Changchun
- District: Jiutai District
- Time zone: UTC+8 (China Standard)

Yingcheng Subdistrict (simplified Chinese: 营城街道; traditional Chinese: 營城街道; pinyin: Yíngchéng Jiēdào) is a subdistrict in Jiutai District, Changchun, Jilin, China. As of 2020, it administers Yingcheng Community, Limin Community (利民社区), Xinghua Community (兴华社区), Huoshiling Village (火石岭村), and Yingcheng Village.

== See also ==
- List of township-level divisions of Jilin
