= Li Tianyou =

Chinese general (1914–1970)

Li Tianyu
- 李天佑
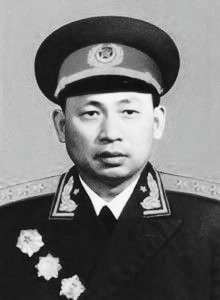
- Li Tianyu in 1955
- Born: January 8, 1914; Lingui, Guangxi, Republic of China
- Died: September 27, 1970 (aged 56); Beijing, China
- Military career
- Allegiance: People's Republic of China
- Branch: People's Liberation Army Ground Force
- Service years: 1928–1970
- Rank: General
- Commands: PLA Deputy Chief of Staff
- Conflicts: Northern Expedition; Second Sino-Japanese War; Chinese Civil War; Baise Uprising; Long March; Battle of Siping; Korean War; Battle of the Ch'ongch'on River
- Awards: Order of the Red Star (Third Class Medal); Order of Bayi (First Class Medal); Order of Independence and Freedom (First Class Medal); Order of Liberation (First Class Medal)

Li Tianyou (Chinese: 李天佑; pinyin: Lǐ Tiānyòu; Wade–Giles: Li T'ien-yu; 1914–1970) was a Chinese general in the People's Liberation Army.

== Early life ==
Born to a poor peasant family in Lingui, Guangxi, Li joined the Chinese Communist Party in 1929, at the age of 15, and in November of that year participated in the Baise Uprising.

== Military career ==
He took part in the Long March (where he earned a reputation as a reckless military leader due to his intentional sacrifice of his entire division, even though that bought more time for the Communist forces to retreat from the pursuing KMT forces) and then fought in both the Second Sino-Japanese War and the Chinese Civil War. In the meantime, from 1938 to 1944 he lived in the Soviet Union, and graduated from the Soviet Frunze Military Academy.

He was Lin Biao's chief of staff during the Chinese Civil War, and, among other actions, led Communist forces to victory in the Battle of Siping.

During the Korean War, he commanded the PVA 13th Army which defeated the UN forces at the Battle of the Ch'ongch'on River.

From 1962 until his death in 1970, he served as Deputy Chief of the PLA General Staff, with overall responsibility for Operations.

== Death ==
He died in 1970, at the age of 56, due to chronic illness.

Military offices
New title	Commander of the 38th Group Army; 1947–1949	Succeeded by Liang Xingchu
