= Dehui =

Dehui 德惠市
- County-level city
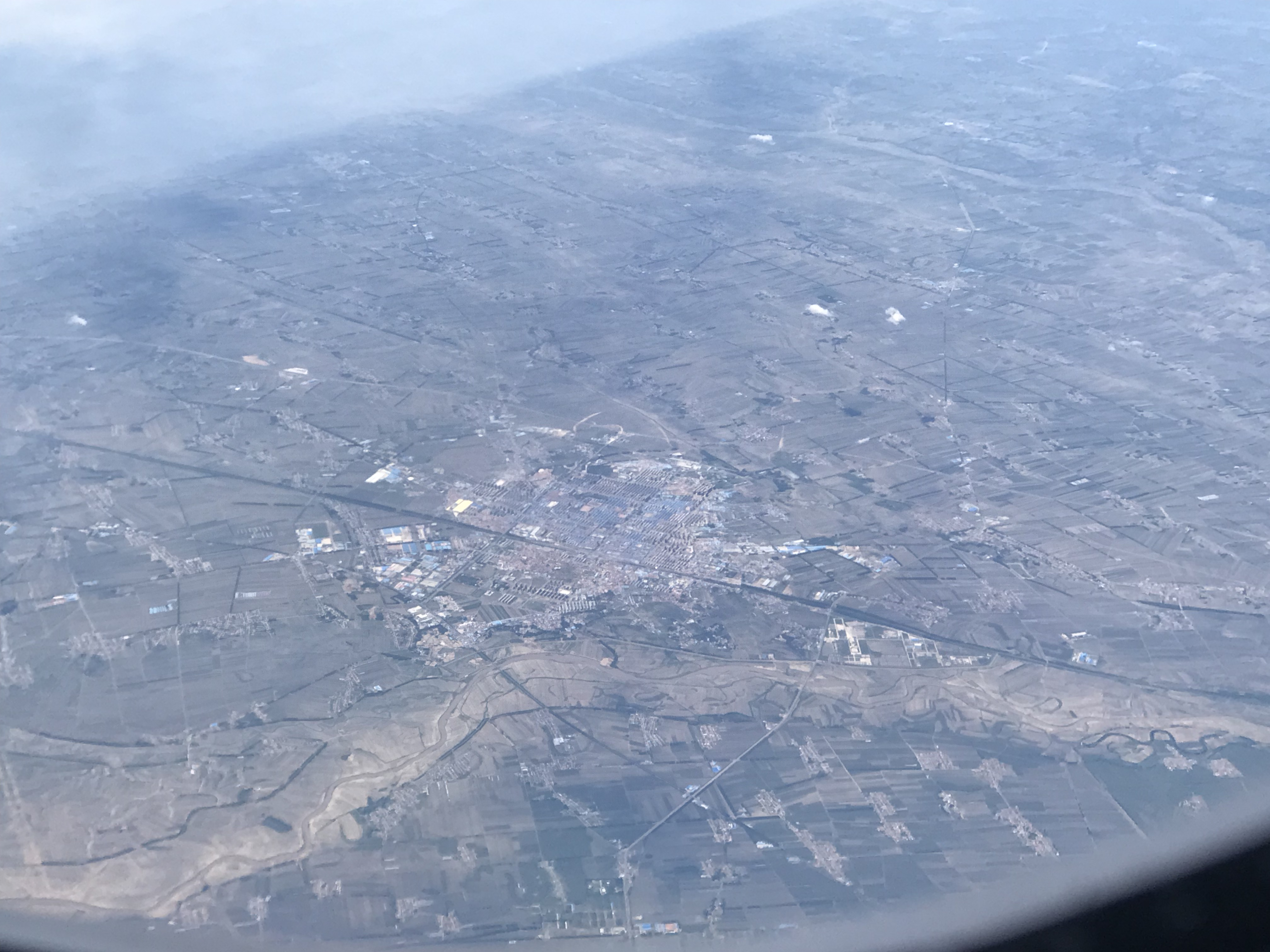

- Location in Jilin
- Coordinates: 44°32′06″N 125°42′11″E
- Country: People's Republic of China
- Province: Jilin
- Sub-provincial city: Changchun
- Divisions: 4 subdistricts 10 towns 4 townships
- Seat: Shengli Subdistrict (胜利街道)

Area
  - County-level city: 3,439.2 km^{2} (1,327.9 sq mi)
  - Urban: 124.83 km^{2} (48.20 sq mi)

Population (2010)
  - County-level city: 748,369
  - Estimate (2017): 932,000
  - Density: 217.60/km^{2} (563.58/sq mi)
  - Urban: 250,000
- Time zone: UTC+8 (China Standard)
- Postal code: 1303XX

Dehui (Chinese: 德惠; pinyin: Déhuì) is a county-level city of Jilin Province, Northeast China. It is under the administration of the prefecture-level city of Changchun, located in the middle of the Songliao Plain. It has a total population of 906,000 and a rural population of 753,000. Composed of 10 towns, four townships and four subdistricts, under which there are 308 villages, it is around 80 kilometres (50 mi) north-northeast of central Changchun. It borders Yushu to the northeast, Jiutai to the south, Kuancheng District to the southwest, Nong'an County to the west, as well as the prefecture-level cities of Jilin to the southeast and Songyuan to the northwest.

== Administrative divisions ==
Subdistricts:

- Shengli Subdistrict (胜利街道), Jianshe Subdistrict (建设街道), Huifa Subdistrict (惠发街道), Xiajiadian Subdistrict (夏家店街道)

Towns:

- Daqingzui (大青嘴镇), Guojia (郭家镇), Songhuajiang (松花江镇), Dajiagou (达家沟镇), Dafangshen (大房身镇), Chalukou (岔路口镇), Zhuchengzi (朱城子镇), Buhai (布海镇), Tiantai (天台镇), Caiyuanzi (菜园子镇)

Townships:

- Tongtai Township (同太乡), Biangang Township (边岗乡), Wutai Township (五台乡), Chaoyang Township (朝阳乡)

== Climate ==
Climate data for Dehui, elevation 169 m (554 ft), (1991–2020 normals, extremes 1981–2010)
Month	Jan	Feb	Mar	Apr	May	Jun	Jul	Aug	Sep	Oct	Nov	Dec	Year
Record high °C (°F)	4.6 (40.3)	13.5 (56.3)	21.6 (70.9)	30.1 (86.2)	34.6 (94.3)	39.8 (103.6)	36.1 (97.0)	34.6 (94.3)	30.6 (87.1)	28.5 (83.3)	20.2 (68.4)	11.3 (52.3)	39.8 (103.6)
Mean daily maximum °C (°F)	−10.2 (13.6)	−4.5 (23.9)	4.3 (39.7)	14.8 (58.6)	22.2 (72.0)	26.9 (80.4)	28.1 (82.6)	27.0 (80.6)	22.2 (72.0)	13.5 (56.3)	1.4 (34.5)	−8.1 (17.4)	11.5 (52.6)
Daily mean °C (°F)	−16.7 (1.9)	−11.3 (11.7)	−2.0 (28.4)	8.3 (46.9)	15.9 (60.6)	21.4 (70.5)	23.5 (74.3)	21.8 (71.2)	15.6 (60.1)	6.9 (44.4)	−4.1 (24.6)	−13.8 (7.2)	5.5 (41.8)
Mean daily minimum °C (°F)	−22.3 (−8.1)	−17.5 (0.5)	−8.0 (17.6)	1.6 (34.9)	9.6 (49.3)	15.9 (60.6)	19.0 (66.2)	17.1 (62.8)	9.5 (49.1)	1.1 (34.0)	−9.2 (15.4)	−18.9 (−2.0)	−0.2 (31.7)
Record low °C (°F)	−39.9 (−39.8)	−37.8 (−36.0)	−28.3 (−18.9)	−12.1 (10.2)	−3.8 (25.2)	3.7 (38.7)	8.5 (47.3)	6.3 (43.3)	−2.8 (27.0)	−14.4 (6.1)	−27.0 (−16.6)	−37.5 (−35.5)	−39.9 (−39.8)
Average precipitation mm (inches)	2.6 (0.10)	4.1 (0.16)	8.9 (0.35)	18.9 (0.74)	54.8 (2.16)	96.8 (3.81)	134.8 (5.31)	113.7 (4.48)	45.7 (1.80)	22.6 (0.89)	12.9 (0.51)	5.9 (0.23)	521.7 (20.54)
Average precipitation days (≥ 0.1 mm)	3.4	2.7	4.4	5.8	10.6	13.0	13.5	11.4	8.2	6.4	5.0	4.7	89.1
Average snowy days	6.4	5.1	6.5	2.1	0.1	0	0	0	0	1.6	6.2	8.1	36.1
Average relative humidity (%)	70	63	55	47	52	63	77	79	71	63	66	70	65
Mean monthly sunshine hours	169.5	192.5	219.9	219.3	241.5	235.4	221.4	216.0	227.0	198.9	160.1	150.7	2,452.2
Percentage possible sunshine	59	65	59	54	53	51	47	50	61	59	56	55	56
Source: China Meteorological Administration
