= Xinlitun =

Xinlitun 新立屯镇
- Town
- Location in Liaoning
- Coordinates: 42°00′29″N 122°09′59″E
- Country: People's Republic of China
- Province: Liaoning
- Prefecture-level city: Jinzhou
- County: Heishan County
- Time zone: UTC+8 (China Standard)

Xinlitun (Chinese: 新立屯; Wade–Giles: Hsin-li-t’un), is a town within Heishan County in Jinzhou prefecture, Liaoning, China. It is in the north east of the prefecture about 100 km west of Shenyang city.

During the Chinese Civil war, Xinlitun and other peripheral towns of Shenyang were captured under command of Lin Biao in January 1948.
