= Siping, Jilin =

Prefecture-level city in Jilin, People's Republic of China

Siping 四平市
- Prefecture-level city
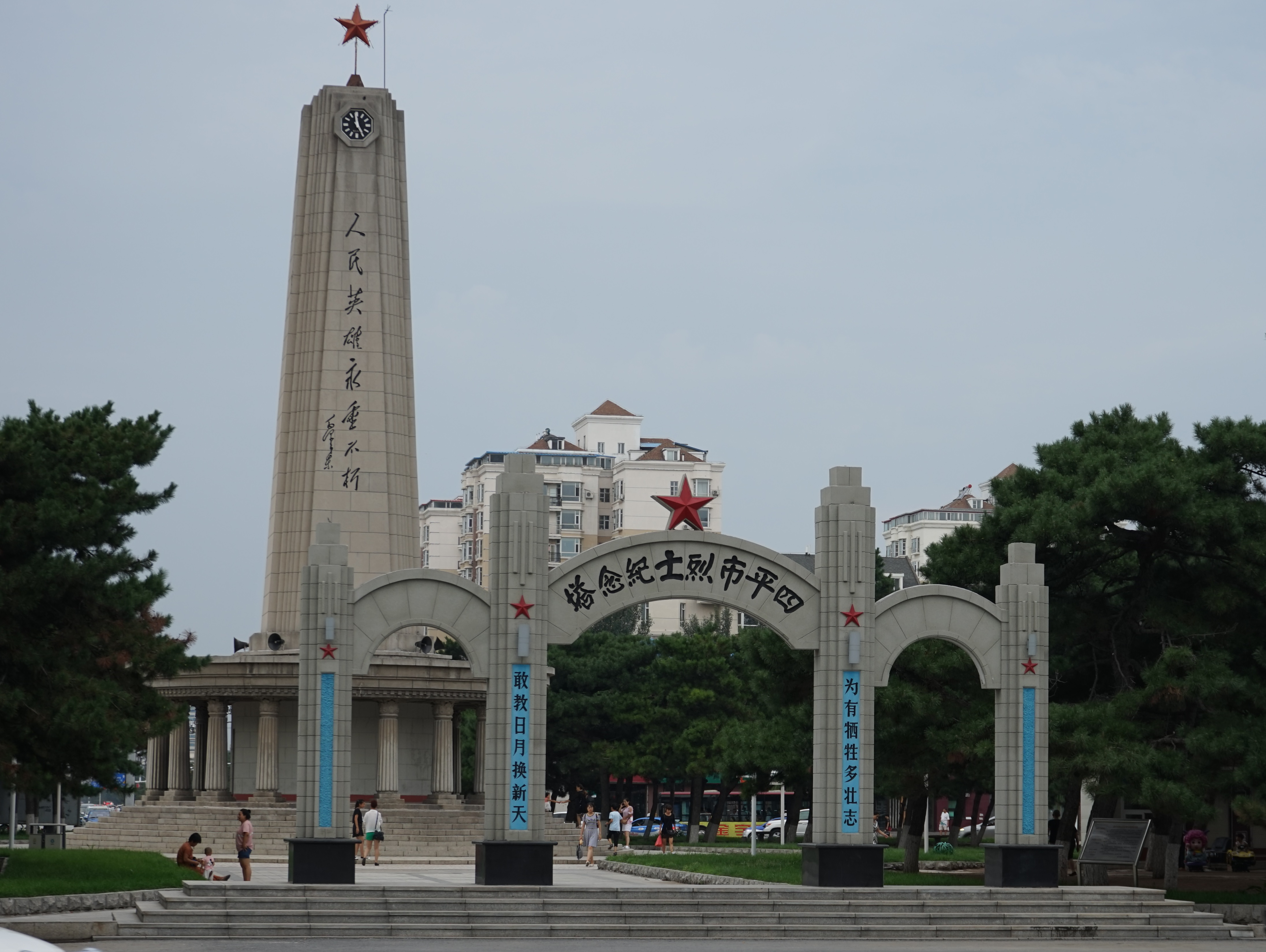
- Siping martyr cenotaph, in Siping

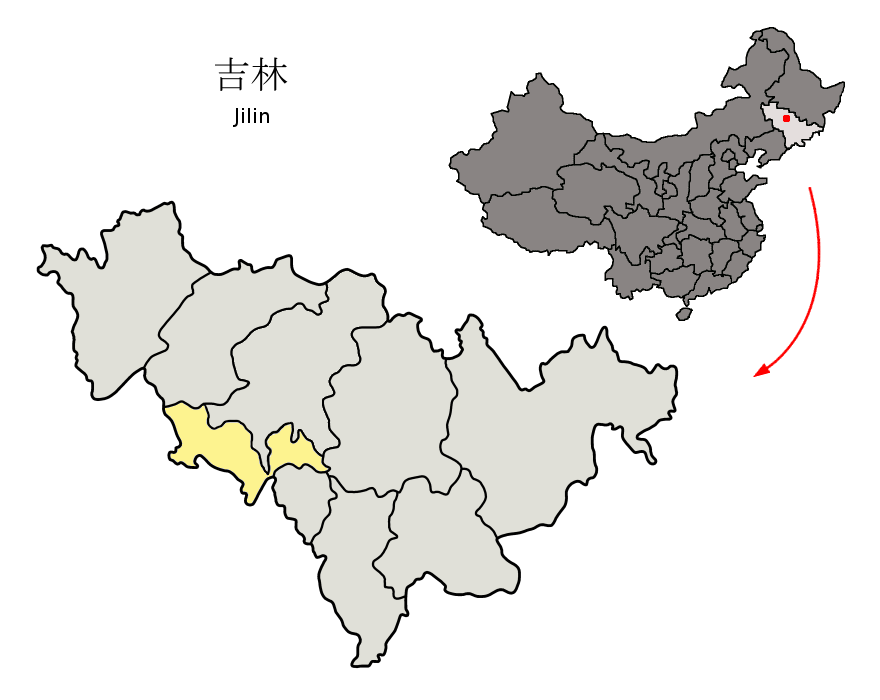
- Location of Siping City (yellow) in Jilin (light grey) and China

- Location of the city centre in Jilin
- Coordinates (Siping municipal government): 43°10′00″N 124°21′02″E
- Country: People's Republic of China
- Province: Jilin
- County-level divisions: 7

Government
  - Type: Prefecture-level city
  - CPC Siping Secretary: Han Fuchun
  - Mayor: Guo Lingji

Area
  - Prefecture-level city: 14,323 km^{2} (5,530 sq mi)
  - Urban (2017): 118.11 km^{2} (45.60 sq mi)
- Elevation: 164 m (538 ft)

Population (2020 census)
  - Prefecture-level city: 1,814,733
  - Density: 126.70/km^{2} (328.15/sq mi)
  - Urban: 627,957
  - Urban density: 5,316.7/km^{2} (13,770/sq mi)
  - Metro: 627,957

GDP
  - Prefecture-level city: CN¥ 123.3 billion US$ 19.8 billion
  - Per capita: CN¥ 37,685; US$ 6,051
- Time zone: UTC+8 (China Standard)
- Postal code: 136000
- Area code: 0434
- ISO 3166 code: CN-JL-03
- License Plate Prefix: 吉C
- Major Nationalities: Han: 91.6%
- Website: siping.gov.cn

Siping (Chinese: 四平; pinyin: Sìpíng), formerly Sipingjie (Chinese: 四平街; pinyin: Sìpíngjiē; Wade–Giles: Ssupingchieh), is a prefecture-level city in the west of Jilin province, People's Republic of China. It has a total population of 1,814,733 inhabitants, as of the 2020 census. Siping covers an area of 14,323 km^{2} (5,530 sq mi) and is located in the middle of the Songliao Plain, near the border with Liaoning and Inner Mongolia provinces.

== History ==
Siping's history can be stretched to 3,000 years ago during the Shang dynasty. The Kingdom of Yan Ruins indicate that the Han Chinese People started moving into Northeast region of China during the Spring and Autumn period. Ancient ethnic tribes such as the Fuyu, the Goguryeo, the Khitans, the Jurchen, the Mongols, the Manchus, and Koreans have left behind cultural artifacts, including Hanzhou, Xinzhou, and the Yehe Tribe Cultural Artifacts.

Yehe Town in Siping is also the hometown of two empresses of the Qing dynasty, Empress Dowager Cixi and Empress Dowager Longyu.

However, Siping was a place of little importance until the completion of the railway between Changchun and the port of Dalian in 1902. With a rapidly growing population, Siping became a regional commercial center. After 1907, Siping's economy experienced steady growth under the administration of the South Manchuria Railway Company. The construction of a railway linked to Baicheng in northwestern Jilin Province was completed in 1923, while a railway running south to Tonghua and to Korean Peninsula was built in 1939. A new town was built after 1921, going by the name Ssupingkai. After 1932, under the Japanese invasion of Manchuria, some agriculture-based industry including brewing, oil pressing and flour milling grew up. In the latter part of World War II, the Japanese completed a project in the construction of a refinery for the production of synthetic petroleum from coal.

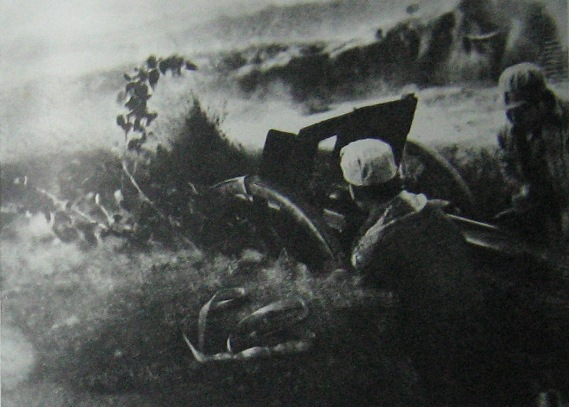
Communist troops in the Battle of Siping.

Siping was the site of several major battles during the Chinese Civil War between the Chinese Communist and Nationalist forces from 1945 to 1949. After the war, Siping was virtually destroyed.

- Battle of Siping, March 15, 1946 − March 17, 1946
- Campaign to Defend Siping, April 17, 1946 − May 19, 1946
- Siping Campaign, June 11, 1947 − March 13, 1948

Siping grew rapidly after the Communist government was established in 1949, being the third largest city in Jilin Province.

== Geography and climate ==
Siping is located in the transition between plains and hilly terrain, with hills to the southeast and the Songliao Plain to the northwest. The city has a four-season, monsoon-influenced, humid continental climate (Köppen Dwa). Winters are long (lasting from November to March), cold, and windy, but dry, due to the influence of the Siberian anticyclone, with a January mean temperature of −13.2 °C (8.2 °F). Spring and fall are somewhat short transitional periods, with some precipitation, but are usually dry and windy. Summers are hot and humid, with a prevailing southeasterly wind due to the East Asian monsoon; July averages 23.7 °C (74.7 °F). Snow is usually light during the winter, and annual rainfall is heavily concentrated from June to August. The annual mean temperature is 7.12 °C (44.8 °F). With monthly percent possible sunshine ranging from 46% in July to 71% in January and February, there are 2,684 hours of bright sunshine annually, with autumn and winter being especially sunny.

Climate data for Siping, elevation 180 m (590 ft), (1991–2020 normals, extremes 1951–present)
Month	Jan	Feb	Mar	Apr	May	Jun	Jul	Aug	Sep	Oct	Nov	Dec	Year
Record high °C (°F)	5.8 (42.4)	16.1 (61.0)	23.3 (73.9)	31.2 (88.2)	36.2 (97.2)	37.3 (99.1)	36.2 (97.2)	36.1 (97.0)	33.3 (91.9)	28.6 (83.5)	20.6 (69.1)	12.2 (54.0)	37.3 (99.1)
Mean daily maximum °C (°F)	−7.6 (18.3)	−2.3 (27.9)	5.3 (41.5)	15.6 (60.1)	22.7 (72.9)	27.1 (80.8)	28.4 (83.1)	27.6 (81.7)	23.2 (73.8)	14.7 (58.5)	3.5 (38.3)	−5.3 (22.5)	12.7 (55.0)
Daily mean °C (°F)	−13.2 (8.2)	−8.0 (17.6)	−0.1 (31.8)	9.7 (49.5)	16.9 (62.4)	21.8 (71.2)	24.0 (75.2)	22.8 (73.0)	17.0 (62.6)	8.6 (47.5)	−1.5 (29.3)	−10.4 (13.3)	7.3 (45.1)
Mean daily minimum °C (°F)	−17.8 (0.0)	−13.2 (8.2)	−5.3 (22.5)	3.7 (38.7)	11.1 (52.0)	16.7 (62.1)	19.9 (67.8)	18.4 (65.1)	11.2 (52.2)	3.1 (37.6)	−6.0 (21.2)	−14.8 (5.4)	2.3 (36.1)
Record low °C (°F)	−33.3 (−27.9)	−34.6 (−30.3)	−29.9 (−21.8)	−19.5 (−3.1)	−3.0 (26.6)	3.8 (38.8)	11.5 (52.7)	5.2 (41.4)	−2.9 (26.8)	−13.2 (8.2)	−24.4 (−11.9)	−31.6 (−24.9)	−34.6 (−30.3)
Average precipitation mm (inches)	5.2 (0.20)	6.3 (0.25)	14.1 (0.56)	24.5 (0.96)	58.9 (2.32)	90.8 (3.57)	140.1 (5.52)	163.1 (6.42)	47.7 (1.88)	29.2 (1.15)	17.8 (0.70)	8.1 (0.32)	605.8 (23.85)
Average precipitation days (≥ 0.1 mm)	4.6	3.6	4.9	6.0	9.9	12.5	13.1	12.3	7.6	6.6	5.5	5.2	91.8
Average snowy days	6.1	4.9	5.2	2.0	0.1	0	0	0	0	1.1	4.9	7.0	31.3
Average relative humidity (%)	66	58	52	46	51	64	77	79	69	63	63	66	63
Mean monthly sunshine hours	197.8	210.8	244.8	235.7	253.3	219.8	193.0	202.4	234.3	213.3	176.3	175.6	2,557.1
Percentage possible sunshine	68	70	66	58	56	48	42	47	63	63	61	63	59
Source: China Meteorological Administrationextremes

== Administrative divisions ==
Siping prefecture includes two districts, two counties and two county-level cities. Four commodity grain bases in Jinlin Province, namely Lishu County, Yitong Manchu Autonomous County, and Shuangliao City, are under the administration of Siping. Gongzhuling City is under the administration of Jilin Province. Siping recorded a population of 1,814,733 in the 2020 census.

Map
Name	Hanzi	Hanyu Pinyin	Population (2013 est.)	Area (km^{2})	Density (/km^{2})
Tiexi District	铁西区	Tiěxī Qū	270,000	162	1,721
Tiedong District	铁东区	Tiědōng Qū	370,000	945	354
Shuangliao City	双辽市	Shuāngliáo Shì	410,000	3,121	135
Lishu County	梨树县	Líshù Xiàn	790,000	3,545	221
Yitong Manchu Autonomous County	伊通满族自治县	Yītōng Mǎnzú Zìzhìxiàn	470,000	2,523	188

== Economy ==
Siping has GDP of RMB 1266.3 billion Yuan in 2015, representing a rise of 6.4% year on year. The city's GDP ranked fourth in Jilin Province (2010). Agricultural products processing, electricity and thermal power, pharmaceutical, and chemicals are the pillar industries. Private economy is also a major contributor of the industrial sector.

== Transport ==
Siping is a transportation hub in Jilin Province. The Qiqihar-Siping, Siping-Meihekou and Beijing–Harbin railways The city is served by both the Siping Railway Station and Siping East Railway Station (IATA: OSQ). The Harbin-Beijing Highspeed Railway also run through the Siping East Railway Station. The new airport will be completed in 2030.

With the Highway, the city run through Beijing-Harbin highway, JiTong highway, Daqiang-Guangzhou Highway, Changchun-Shenzhen Expressway, ChangYing highway, TieChao highway (Beijing-Siping highway), Yi Liao Expressway and Changchun-Liaoyuan highway. The city of Siping also has a ring first grade highway, which is connected to the 102 National Road and 303 National Road in the four directions.

Siping is 550 kilometers away from Dalian international shipping center. It is one hour away from Changchun Longjia Airport and Shenyang Taoxian International Airport. The Siping local dual-use airport is about to open domestic flights.

== Notable people ==
- Jia Hongsheng (1967−2010), actor
- John Derbyshire, American writer, lived in Siping 1982−83. The city is mentioned in his 1996 novel Seeing Calvin Coolidge in a Dream, Chapter 9, the city's name translated there as "Fourfold Peace."
- Chen Jining (1964−), politician and Communist Party Secretary of Shanghai. (Lishu County, Siping, Jilin is Chen's ancestral home)

== Sister cities ==
- Makhachkala, Dagestan, Russia
- Tecate, Baja California, Mexico
