= Officials implicated by the anti-corruption campaign in China (2017–2022) =

List of implicated Chinese officials

This is a list of officials implicated by the anti-corruption campaign in China between 2017 and 2022. The tables include only officials for whom a case was initiated by the Central Commission for Discipline Inspection (CCDI) of the Chinese Communist Party (CCP).

== List ==
Officials implicated by the anti-corruption campaign in China, 2017–2022
Name	Position/Former Position	Announcement date	Status
Deputy National Level
Yang Jing	Secretary of the Secretariat of the 18th CCP Central Committee, State Councilor and Secretary-General of the State Council	February 24, 2018	Placed on probation for one year in the Party, removed from administrative position, and demoted to the rank of minister.
Provincial and Ministerial Level
Lu Wei	Former Deputy Minister of the Publicity Department of the CCP Central Committee and former Director of the Cyberspace Administration of China	November 21, 2017	Expelled from the Party and removed from public office, sentenced to 14 years in prison.
Nur Bekri	Member of the Party Leadership Group and deputy director of the National Development and Reform Commission, Secretary of the Party Leadership Group and Director of the National Energy Administration	September 21, 2018	Expelled from the Party, removed from public office, and sentenced to life imprisonment.
Meng Hongwei	Deputy Minister of Public Security	October 7, 2018	Expelled from the Party and removed from public office, sentenced to 13 years and 6 months in prison.
Zhao Zhengyong	Former Vice Chairman of the Internal Affairs and Judicial Committee of the National People's Congress, former Secretary of the Shaanxi Provincial Committee of the Chinese Communist Party, and former Chairman of the Standing Committee of the Provincial People's Congress	January 15, 2019	Expelled from the Party, revoked of benefits, sentenced to death with a two-year reprieve.
Qin Guangrong	Former Vice Chairman of the Internal Affairs and Judicial Committee of the National People's Congress, former Secretary of the Yunnan Provincial Committee of the Chinese Communist Party, and former Chairman of the Standing Committee of the Provincial People's Congress	May 9, 2019	Expelled from the Party, his benefits cancelled, and sentenced to seven years in prison.
Liu Shiyu	Deputy Secretary of the Party Leadership Group and Director of the Board of Directors of the All-China Federation of Supply and Marketing Cooperatives	May 19, 2019	Placed on probation for two years, removed from government post, and demoted to first-level researcher.
Wang Fuyu	Former Chairman and Party Secretary of the Guizhou Provincial CPPCC	February 21, 2021	Expelled from the Party, revoked of benefits, sentenced to death with a two-year reprieve.
Fu Zhenghua	Deputy Director of the Social and Legal Affairs Committee of the National Committee of the Chinese People's Political Consultative Conference, former Minister of Justice	October 2, 2021	Expelled from the Party, removed from public office, sentenced to death with a two-year reprieve.
Shen Deyong	Chairman of the Social and Legal Affairs Committee of the National Committee of the Chinese People's Political Consultative Conference, former Executive Vice President of the Supreme People's Court	March 21, 2022	Expelled from the Party and removed from public office, sentenced to 15 years in prison.
Sheng Guangzu	Former General Manager and Party Secretary of China Railway Corporation, Former Vice Chairman of the Financial and Economic Committee of the National People's Congress	March 25, 2022	Expelled from the party, deprived of his benefits, sentenced to 15 years in prison.
Xiao Yaqing	Secretary of the Party Leadership Group and Minister of the Ministry of Industry and Information Technology	July 28, 2022	Expelled from the Party, removed from government post, demoted to first-level section chief, and retired.
Li Jia	Former Chairman and Party Secretary of Shanxi Provincial CPPCC	August 26, 2022	Removed from Party and government posts, demoted to vice-ministerial level.
Deputy-Provincial (Deputy-Ministerial) Level
Liu Qiang	Vice Governor of Liaoning Province	November 23, 2017	Expelled from the Party and removed from public office, sentenced to 12 years in prison.
Zhang Jiehui	Vice Chairman of the Standing Committee of Hebei Provincial People's Congress	December 12, 2017	Expelled from the Party and removed from public office, sentenced to 15 years' imprisonment.
Feng Xinzhu	Vice Governor of Shaanxi Province	January 3, 2018	Expelled from the Party and removed from public office, sentenced to 15 years in prison.
Ji Xiangqi	Vice Governor of Shandong Province	January 4, 2018	Expelled from the Party and removed from public office, sentenced to 14 years in prison.
Li Yihuang	Vice Governor of Jiangxi Province	January 17, 2018	Expelled from the Party and removed from public office, sentenced to 18 years in prison.
Liu Jun	Former member of the Party Leadership Group and Vice Chairman of the Guangxi Zhuang Autonomous Region CPPCC	February 12, 2018	Expelled from the Party, dismissed from administrative post, demoted to deputy director level non-leadership position.
Wang Xiaoguang	Former member of the Standing Committee of the CCP Guizhou Provincial Committee and Vice Governor	April 1, 2018	Expelled from the Party and removed from public office, sentenced to 20 years' imprisonment.
Bai Xiangqun	Vice Chairman of the Inner Mongolia Autonomous Region Government	April 25, 2018	Expelled from the Party and removed from public office, sentenced to 16 years in prison.
Pu Bo	Vice Governor of Guizhou Province	May 4, 2018	Expelled from the Party and removed from public office, sentenced to life imprisonment.
Zhang Shaochun	Former Deputy Secretary of the Party Committee and Deputy Minister of the Ministry of Finance	May 7, 2018	Expelled from the Party and removed from public office, sentenced to 15 years' imprisonment.
Sun Bo	Deputy Secretary of the Party Committee and General Manager of China Shipbuilding Industry Corporation	June 16, 2018	Expelled from the Party and removed from public office, sentenced to 12 years in prison.
Zeng Zhiquan	Member of the Standing Committee of the CCP Guangdong Provincial Committee and Minister of the United Front Work Department	July 11, 2018	Expelled from the Party and removed from public office, sentenced to life imprisonment.
Ai Wenli	Former Vice Chairman of Hebei Provincial CPPCC	July 31, 2018	Expelled from the Party and sentenced to eight years in prison.
Chen Zhifeng	Former Vice Mayor of Tianjin	August 7, 2018	Given a two-year probationary period within the Party and his retirement benefits were determined according to the level of deputy department head.
Wu Zhen	Former Deputy Director of the State Food and Drug Administration	August 16, 2018	Expelled from the Party and removed from public office, sentenced to 16 years in prison.
Wang Tie	Deputy Secretary and deputy director of the Party Leadership Group of the Standing Committee of the Henan Provincial People's Congress	August 17, 2018	Expelled from the Party, dismissed from government post, demoted to a deputy director-level non-leadership position, and put through retirement procedures.
Wang Erzhi	Former Vice Chairman and Deputy Secretary of the Party Group of the Jilin Provincial Committee of the Chinese People's Political Consultative Conference	August 25, 2018	Expelled from the Party and removed from public office, sentenced to 14 years in prison.
Li Shixiang	Former Vice Chairman and Deputy Secretary of the Party Leadership Group of Beijing CPPCC	September 15, 2018	Expelled from the Party, deprived of his benefits, and sentenced to 10 years in prison.
Jin Suidong	Former Vice Chairman and Deputy Secretary of the Party Group of the Henan Provincial Committee of the Chinese People's Political Consultative Conference	September 18, 2018	Expelled from the Party, deprived of his benefits, sentenced to 15 years in prison.
Xing Yun	Former Vice Chairman of the Standing Committee of the Inner Mongolia Autonomous Region People's Congress	October 25, 2018	Expelled from the Party, revoked of benefits, sentenced to death with a two-year reprieve.
Qian Yin'an	Member of the Standing Committee and Secretary-General of Shaanxi Provincial Committee of the Chinese Communist Party	November 1, 2018	Expelled from the Party and removed from public office, sentenced to 14 years in prison.
Mu Ruilin	Vice Governor of Jiangsu Province	November 15, 2018	Expelled from the Party and removed from public office, sentenced to 10 years and 6 months in prison.
Li Jianhua	Former Deputy Secretary and deputy director of the Party Group of the Standing Committee of the Gansu Provincial People's Congress	December 18, 2018	Expelled from the Party, dismissed from government post, demoted to a deputy director-level non-leadership position, and put through retirement procedures.
Chen Gang	Member of the Party Leadership Group and Secretary of the Secretariat of the China Association for Science and Technology	January 6, 2019	Expelled from the Party and removed from public office, sentenced to 15 years' imprisonment.
Zhang Maocai	Former Vice Chairman of the Standing Committee of Shanxi Provincial People's Congress	March 2, 2019	Expelled from the Party and removed from public office, sentenced to 15 years in prison.
Wei Chuanzhong	Former member of the Party Leadership Group and deputy director of the General Administration of Quality Supervision, Inspection and Quarantine	March 15, 2019	Expelled from the Party, deprived of his benefits, sentenced to life imprisonment.
Peng Yuxing	Vice Governor of Sichuan Province	April 28, 2019	Expelled from the Party, removed from government post, demoted to Level 4 researcher.
Xiang Lili	Vice Chairman of the Standing Committee of Hunan Provincial People's Congress	May 17, 2019	Expelled from the Party and removed from public office, sentenced to 15 years' imprisonment.
Yun Guangzhong	Member of the Standing Committee of the CCP Inner Mongolia Autonomous Region Party Committee and Secretary of the Hohhot Municipal Party Committee	June 11, 2019	Expelled from the Party and removed from public office, sentenced to 14 years in prison.
Yang Keqin	Party Secretary and Chief Prosecutor of the People's Procuratorate of Jilin Province	July 17, 2019	Expelled from the Party and removed from public office, sentenced to 13 years in prison.
Hu Huaibang	Former Party Secretary and Chairman of China Development Bank	July 31, 2019	Expelled from the Party, deprived of his benefits, sentenced to life imprisonment.
Xu Guang	Member of the Party Leadership Group and Vice Governor of Henan Provincial People's Government	August 24, 2019	Expelled from the Party and removed from public office, sentenced to 11 years in prison.
Zhang Jian	Former Party Secretary and President of Anhui Provincial High People's Court	August 25, 2019	Expelled from the Party, deprived of his benefits, and sentenced to 15 years in prison.
Li Qian	Member of the Party Leadership Group and Vice Governor of Hebei Provincial People's Government	August 27, 2019	Expelled from the Party and removed from public office, sentenced to 13 years in prison.
Zhang Qi	Member of the Standing Committee of the Hainan Provincial Committee of the Chinese Communist Party, Secretary of the Haikou Municipal Committee	September 6, 2019	Expelled from the Party and removed from public office, sentenced to life imprisonment.
Jiang Guowen	Chairman and Party Secretary of Harbin CPPCC	September 24, 2019	Expelled from the Party and removed from public office, sentenced to life imprisonment.
Li Qingkui	Former Party Secretary and Chairman of China Southern Power Grid Co., Ltd.	October 22, 2019	The Party has been given a two-year probationary period, and the retirement benefits of the deputy head of the headquarters department of China Southern Power Grid Co., Ltd. have been determined.
Cloud Citizen	Former Deputy Secretary of the Party Committee and General Manager of China Huadian	October 24, 2019	Expelled from the Party and removed from public office, sentenced to death with a two-year reprieve.
Ma Ming	Member of the Party Leadership Group and Vice Chairman of the Inner Mongolia Autonomous Region CPPCC	December 1, 2019	Expelled from the Party and removed from public office, sentenced to life imprisonment.
Zhao Shijie	Former Party Secretary and President of Yunnan Provincial High People's Court	December 14, 2019	One year of probation within the Party, with retirement benefits determined according to the level 2 inspector.
Chen Guoqiang	Former Secretary General and Vice Governor of Shaanxi Provincial People's Government	January 4, 2020	Expelled from the Party and removed from public office, sentenced to 13 years in prison.
Zhang Zhinan	Member of the Standing Committee of the Fujian Provincial Committee of the Chinese Communist Party, Vice Governor of the Fujian Provincial People's Government	April 12, 2020	Expelled from the Party and removed from public office, sentenced to 14 years in prison.
Sun Lijun	Member of the Party Committee and Vice Minister of the Ministry of Public Security	April 19, 2020	Expelled from the Party, removed from public office, sentenced to death with a two-year reprieve.
Zhang He	Former member of the Standing Committee of the Hebei Provincial Committee of the Chinese Communist Party and former vice governor of the Hebei Provincial People's Government	April 29, 2020	Expelled from the Party and his retirement benefits determined according to the level of a fourth-level researcher.
Hu Wenming	Former Party Secretary and Chairman of China Shipbuilding Industry Corporation	May 12, 2020	Expelled from the Party, his benefits revoked, and sentenced to 13 years in prison.
Ren Hua	Vice Chairman of the People's Government of Xinjiang Uygur Autonomous Region	June 1, 2020	Expelled from the Party and removed from public office, sentenced to 14 years in prison.
Deng Huilin	Deputy Mayor of Chongqing Municipal People's Government and Director of Chongqing Municipal Public Security Bureau	June 14, 2020	Expelled from the Party and removed from public office, sentenced to 15 years in prison.
Wang Yong	Vice Chairman of Hainan Provincial CPPCC	July 13, 2020	Expelled from the Party and removed from public office, sentenced to life imprisonment.
Liu Guoqiang	Former Vice Chairman of Liaoning Provincial CPPCC	July 13, 2020	Expelled from the Party, revoked of benefits, sentenced to death with a two-year reprieve.
Li Jinzao	Deputy Secretary of the Party Leadership Group and Vice Minister of the Ministry of Culture and Tourism	July 29, 2020	Expelled from the Party and removed from public office, sentenced to 15 years in prison.
Gong Daoan	Deputy Mayor of Shanghai Municipal People's Government, Director of Shanghai Municipal Public Security Bureau	August 18, 2020	Expelled from the Party and removed from public office, sentenced to life imprisonment.
Li Wei	Vice Chairman of Beijing CPPCC	August 25, 2020	Expelled from the Party and removed from public office, sentenced to nine years in prison.
Wen Guodong	Vice Governor of Qinghai Provincial People's Government, Secretary of CCP Haixi Prefecture Committee, Secretary of Party Working Committee of Qaidam Circular Economy Experimental Zone	September 6, 2020	Expelled from the Party and removed from public office, sentenced to 11 years in prison.
Shi Wenqing	Former Vice Chairman of the Standing Committee of Jiangxi Provincial People's Congress	September 21, 2020	Expelled from the Party, revoked of benefits, sentenced to death with a two-year reprieve.
Dong Hong	Former Deputy Ministerial Inspection Specialist of the Central Inspection Team	October 2, 2020	Expelled from the Party, revoked of benefits, sentenced to death with a two-year reprieve.
Wang Like	Member of the Standing Committee of the Jiangsu Provincial Committee of the Chinese Communist Party and Secretary of the Political and Legal Affairs Commission	October 24, 2020	Expelled from the Party, removed from public office, sentenced to death with a two-year reprieve.
Tong Daochi	Member of the Standing Committee of the Hainan Provincial Committee of the Chinese Communist Party, Secretary of Sanya Municipal Committee	November 1, 2020	Expelled from the Party, removed from public office, sentenced to death with a two-year reprieve.
Li Wenxi	Former Vice Chairman of Liaoning Provincial CPPCC	January 25, 2021	Expelled from the Party, removed from public office, sentenced to death with a two-year reprieve.
Song Liang	Member of the Standing Committee of the CCP Gansu Provincial Committee and Executive Vice Governor	February 1, 2021	Expelled from the Party, removed from public office, and sentenced to life imprisonment.
Zhang Xinqi	Former Vice Chairman of the Standing Committee of Shandong Provincial People's Congress	February 23, 2021	Expelled from the Party, deprived of his benefits, sentenced to life imprisonment.
Peng Bo	Former Deputy Director of the Office of the Central Leading Group for Preventing and Handling Cults	March 13, 2021	Expelled from the Party, deprived of his benefits, and sentenced to 14 years in prison.
Yin Jiaxu	Former Party Secretary and Chairman of China North Industries Group Corporation	April 4, 2021	Expel from the Party, cancel benefits, and transfer to judicial organs for review and prosecution in accordance with the law.
Liu Xinyun	Vice Governor of Shanxi Provincial People's Government and Director of the Provincial Public Security Department	April 4, 2021	Expelled from the Party and removed from public office, sentenced to 14 years in prison.
Xiao Yi	Vice Chairman of Jiangxi Provincial CPPCC	May 10, 2021	Expelled from the Party and removed from public office, sentenced to life imprisonment.
Gan Rongkun	Member of the Standing Committee of the Henan Provincial Committee of the Chinese Communist Party and Secretary of the Political and Legal Affairs Commission	June 1, 2021	Expelled from the Party, removed from public office, sentenced to life imprisonment
Meng Yongshan	Chief Prosecutor and Party Secretary of the People's Procuratorate of Qinghai Province	June 2, 2021	He was expelled from the Party and removed from public office and sentenced to 11 years' imprisonment .
Liu Chuansheng	Former Secretary of the Party Committee of Beijing Normal University	July 8, 2021	Expelled from the Party, retirement benefits adjusted to level 6 staff
Xu Ming	Former member of the Party Leadership Group and deputy director of the State Grain Administration	July 13, 2021	Expelled from the Party, deprived of his benefits, and sentenced to 15 years in prison.
Song Taiping	Former Vice Chairman of the Standing Committee of Hebei Provincial People's Congress	July 25, 2021	Expelled from the Party, deprived of his benefits, sentenced to 14 years in prison.
Cai Esheng	Former Vice Chairman of China Banking Regulatory Commission	July 30, 2021	Expelled from the Party, revoked of benefits, sentenced to death with a two-year reprieve.
Zhou Jiangyong	Member of the Standing Committee of the CCP Zhejiang Provincial Committee and Secretary of the Hangzhou Municipal Committee	August 21, 2021	Expelled from the Party and removed from public office, sentenced to death with a two-year reprieve.
Xue Heng	Former Vice Chairman and Party Group Member of Liaoning Provincial CPPCC	August 23, 2021	Expelled from the Party, deprived of his benefits, sentenced to 17 years in prison.
Gong Jianhua	Vice Chairman of the Standing Committee of Jiangxi Provincial People's Congress	November 29, 2021	Expelled from the Party and removed from public office, sentenced to 15 years in prison.
Zhang Jinghua	Former Deputy Secretary of Jiangsu Provincial Committee of the Chinese Communist Party and Deputy Secretary of the Party Leadership Group of Jiangsu Provincial Committee of the Chinese People's Political Consultative Conference	December 1, 2021	Expelled from the Party, removed from public office, and sentenced to 14 years in prison.
Zhang Yongze	Vice Chairman of the Tibet Autonomous Region Government	January 8, 2022	Expelled from the Party, removed from public office, and sentenced to 14 years in prison.
Wang Bin	Party Secretary and Chairman of China Life Insurance (Group) Company	January 8, 2022	Expelled from the Party and removed from public office, sentenced to death with a two-year reprieve.
Liu Hongwu	Vice Chairman of the Guangxi Zhuang Autonomous Region Government	January 14, 2022	Expelled from the Party, removed from public office, and sentenced to 15 years in prison.
Wang Minghui	Vice Chairman of the Standing Committee of Sichuan Provincial People's Congress	January 22, 2022	Expelled from the Party, removed from public office, and sentenced to 16 years in prison.
Xie Jilai	Former Vice Chairman of the Standing Committee of Hebei Provincial People's Congress	January 26, 2022	Expelled from the Party, deprived of benefits, sentenced to 15 years in prison.
Song Xibin	Vice Chairman of the Standing Committee of the Heilongjiang Provincial People's Congress	January 26, 2022	Expelled from the Party, removed from public office, and sentenced to 14 years in prison.
Li Guohua	Former Deputy Secretary of the Party Committee and General Manager of China Unicom	February 18, 2022	Expelled from the Party, deprived of his benefits, sentenced to 16 years in prison.
Cao Guangjing	Vice Governor of Hubei Provincial People's Government	February 24, 2022	Expelled from the Party, removed from public office, sentenced to life imprisonment.
Chen Jiadong	Former Chairman and Party Secretary of the Standing Committee of Xiamen Municipal People's Congress	February 25, 2022	Expelled from the Party and removed from public office, sentenced to life imprisonment.
Wang Dawei	Vice Governor of Liaoning Provincial People's Government and Director of Liaoning Provincial Public Security Department	March 1, 2022	Expelled from the Party, removed from public office, sentenced to death with a two-year reprieve.
Liu Yanping	Former head of the Central Commission for Discipline Inspection and the National Supervisory Commission 's Discipline Inspection and Supervision Group in the Ministry of State Security	March 12, 2022	Expelled from the Party, removed from public office, sentenced to death with a two-year reprieve.
Huang Yi	Former member of the Party Leadership Group and Vice Chairman of the Yunnan Provincial CPPCC	March 24, 2022	Expelled from the Party, deprived of his benefits, and sentenced to 13 years in prison.
Hao Chunrong	Vice Governor of Liaoning Provincial People's Government	March 29, 2022	Expelled from the Party and removed from public office, sentenced to 12 years in prison.
Li Jiexiang	Member of the Standing Committee of the Qinghai Provincial Committee of the Chinese Communist Party, Vice Chairman and Party Secretary of the Standing Committee of the Qinghai Provincial People's Congress	April 7, 2022	Expelled from the Party, removed from public office, sentenced to life imprisonment.
Sun Yuanliang	Former Vice Chairman of Liaoning Provincial CPPCC	April 9, 2022	Expelled from the Party, revoked of benefits, sentenced to death with a two-year reprieve.
Yu Luming	Vice Chairman of Beijing CPPCC	April 16, 2022	Expelled from the Party and removed from public office, sentenced to 11 years in prison.
Hu Yifeng	Former Party Secretary and President of the Higher People's Court of Inner Mongolia Autonomous Region	April 22, 2022	Expelled from the Party, removed from public office, and sentenced to 14 years in prison.
Li Zefeng	Former member of the Party Leadership Group and Vice Chairman of the Ningxia Hui Autonomous Region CPPCC	May 30, 2022	He was placed on probation for one year in the Party, removed from his government post, and demoted to a second-level inspector.
Chen Rugui	Member of the Party Leadership Group and Vice Chairman of the Standing Committee of the Guangdong Provincial People's Congress	June 1, 2022	Expelled from the Party, removed from public office, sentenced to life imprisonment.
Zhang Bencai	Chief Prosecutor of Shanghai Municipal People's Procuratorate	June 1, 2022	Expelled from the Party, removed from public office, and sentenced to 14 years in prison.
Sun Guoxiang	Vice Chairman of Liaoning Provincial People's Congress Standing Committee	June 2, 2022	Expelled from the Party, removed from public office, sentenced to life imprisonment.
Zhang Wufeng	Former Party Secretary and Director of the State Administration of Grain and Material Reserves	June 15, 2022	Expelled from the Party, removed from public office, and sentenced to ten years in prison.
