= Inner Mongolia Autonomous Regional Committee of the Chinese Communist Party =

Inner Mongolia Autonomous Regional Committee of the Chinese Communist Party 中国共产党内蒙古自治区委员会 ᠳᠤᠮᠳᠠᠳᠤ ᠤᠯᠤᠰ ᠤᠨ ᠡᠪ ᠬᠠᠮᠲᠤ ᠨᠠᠮ ᠤᠨ ᠥᠪᠥᠷ ᠮᠣᠩᠭᠣᠯ ᠤᠨ ᠥᠪᠡᠷᠲᠡᠭᠡᠨ ᠵᠠᠰᠠᠬᠤ ᠣᠷᠣᠨ ᠤ ᠬᠣᠷᠢᠶ᠎ᠠ

Overview
- Type: Highest decision-making organ when Inner Mongolia Autonomous Regional Congress is not in session.
- Elected by: Inner Mongolia Autonomous Regional Congress
- Length of term: Five years
- Term limits: None
- First convocation: July 1947

Leadership
- Secretary: Wang Weizhong
- Deputy Secretary: Bao Gang (Government Chairman); Shi Guanghui (Political and Legal Affairs Commission Secretary)
- Secretary-General: Yu Lixin
- Executive organ: Standing Committee
- Inspection organ: Commission for Discipline Inspection

Inner Mongolia Autonomous Regional Committee of the Chinese Communist Party
- Simplified Chinese: 中国共产党内蒙古自治区委员会
- Traditional Chinese: 中國共產黨內蒙古自治區委員會
Transcriptions
Standard Mandarin
- Hanyu Pinyin: Zhōngguó Gòngchǎndǎng Nèiměnggǔ Zìzhìqū Wěiyuánhuì

Abbreviation
- Simplified Chinese: 中共内蒙古自治区委
- Traditional Chinese: 中共內蒙古自治區委
- Literal meaning: CCP Inner Mongolia Autonomous Regional Committee
Transcriptions
Standard Mandarin
- Hanyu Pinyin: Zhōnggòng Nèiměnggǔ Zìzhìqū Wěi

The Inner Mongolia Autonomous Regional Committee of the Chinese Communist Party is the regional committee of the Chinese Communist Party (CCP) in the Inner Mongolia Autonomous Region. The CCP committee secretary is the highest ranking post in the region. The current secretary is Sun Shaocheng, who succeeded Shi Taifeng on 30 April 2022.

== History ==
In July 1947, the CCP Central Committee approved the establishment of the CCP Central Committee Inner Mongolia Autonomous Region Committee.

== Organization ==
The organization of the CCP Inner Mongolia Committee includes:

- General Office

=== Functional Departments ===
- Organization Department
- Publicity Department
- United Front Work Department
- Political and Legal Affairs Commission

=== Offices ===
- Policy Research Office
- Office of the National Security Commission
- Office of the Cyberspace Affairs Commission
- Office of the Foreign Affairs Commission
- Office of the Institutional Organization Commission
- Office of the Military-civilian Fusion Development Committee
- Office of the Leading Group for Inspection Work
- Bureau of Veteran Cadres

=== Dispatched institutions ===
- Working Committee of the Organs Directly Affiliated to the Inner Mongolia Regional Committee

=== Organizations directly under the Committee ===
- Inner Mongolia Party School
- Inner Mongolia Daily
- Inner Mongolia Institute of Socialism
- Party History Research Office
- Inner Mongolia Regional Archives

== Leadership ==
=== Party Committees ===
10th Regional Party Committee (November 2016–November 2021)

- Secretary: Li Jiheng (until 25 October 2019), Shi Taifeng (from 25 October 2019)
- Deputy Secretaries: Bu Xiaolin (until July 2021), Li Jia (until March 2018), Lin Shaochun (from March 2019), Wang Lixia (from July 2021)
- Other Standing Committee members: Zhang Jianmin (until July 2018), Wang Lixia, Zeng Yichun (until February 2019), Liu Qifan (until November 2021), Zhang Yuanzhong (until January 2020), Yun Guangzhong (until June 2019, put under investigation), Song Liang (until March 2017), Bai Yugang (until July 2021), Luo Yonggang (until April 2019), Li Jiexiang (May 2017–September 2019), Leng Jiesong (January 2018–July 2019), Ma Xuejun (July 2018–July 2020), Lin Shaochun (from March 2019), Yang Weidong (from March 2019), Zhang Shaochun (from May 2019), Duan Zhiqiang (from December 2019), Zhang Enhui (March 2020–March 2021), Meng Fanli (from September 2020), Ma Qinglei (from January 2021), Meng Xiandong (from May 2021), Zheng Hongfan (from August 2021), Ding Xiufeng (from August 2021), Bao Gang (from September 2021), Liu Shuang (from November 2021)

11th Regional Party Committee (November 2021–)

- Secretary: Shi Taifeng (until 30 April 2022), Sun Shaocheng (from 30 April 2022)
- Deputy Secretaries: Wang Lixia, Meng Fanli (until April 2022), Yang Weidong (from July 2022)
- Other Standing Committee members: Liu Shuang, Yang Weidong, Bao Gang, Zheng Hongfan, Ding Xiufeng, Meng Xiandong, Yang Xiaokang, Huang Zhiqiang, Khokheuul, Yu Lixin, Li Yugang (from September 2022)
