= Du Zi =

Chinese politician

- 杜梓

Vice Chairman of the Inner Mongolia Regional People's Congress
- In office January 2015 – January 2018
- Chairman: Wang Jun; Li Jiheng

Communist Party Secretary of Tongliao
- In office February 2011 – January 2015
- Preceded by: Fu Tiegang
- Succeeded by: Song Liang

Chairman of the Ordos Municipal People's Congress
- In office December 2008 – February 2011
- Preceded by: Yun Feng
- Succeeded by: Yun Guangzhong

Communist Party Secretary of Ordos
- In office November 2008 – February 2011
- Deputy: Yun Guangzhong
- Preceded by: Yun Feng
- Succeeded by: Yun Guangzhong

Mayor of Ordos
- In office January 2007 – November 2008
- Party Secretary: Yun Feng
- Preceded by: Liu Jin
- Succeeded by: Yun Guangzhong

Personal details
- Born: June 1955 (age 71) Togtoh County, Inner Mongolia, China
- Party: Chinese Communist Party (1974–2024; expelled)
- Education: Inner Mongolia Normal University

Du Zi (Chinese: 杜梓; pinyin: Dù Zǐ; born June 1955) is a retired Chinese politician who spent his entire career in north China's Inner Mongolia Autonomous Region. He was investigated by China's top anti-graft agency in April 2024. He has been retired for 6 years. Previously he served as vice chairman of the Inner Mongolia Regional People's Congress.

== Early life and education ==
Du was born in Togtoh County, Inner Mongolia, in June 1955. He was a sent-down youth in Helin County between April 1973 and October 1975 during the Cultural Revolution. He joined the Chinese Communist Party (CCP) in October 1974. In 1975, he enrolled at Inner Mongolia Normal University, where he majored in Chinese language and literature.

== Career ==
After graduation in 1978, Du taught at Inner Mongolia Mongolian Language School.

He was an editor of the Urban Edition of the Education Magazine of the CCP in March 1980, becoming deputy director in June 1984 and director in December 1989.

He was director of the Publicity Division of Publicity Department of the CCP Inner Mongolia Regional Committee in April 1991 and subsequently director of the Office in March 1996. He was appointed head of the Publicity Department of the CCP Ikzhao League Committee in May 1997 and was admitted to member of the CCP Ikzhao League Committee, the league's top authority.

He was transferred to Ordos in September 2001 and appointed deputy party secretary. In September 2006, he was named acting mayor, confirmed in January 2007. He rose to become party secretary, the top political position in the city, in November 2008. He concurrently served as chairman of the People's Congress since the following month.

He was appointed party secretary of Tongliao in February 2011 and nine months later was admitted to member of the CCP Tongliao Municipal Committee, the city's top authority.

In January 2015, he was chosen as vice chairman of the Inner Mongolia Regional People's Congress, the top legislative body of Inner Mongolia Autonomous Region. He retired in January 2018.

== Downfall ==
On 15 April 2024, he was suspected of "serious violations of laws and regulations" by the Central Commission for Discipline Inspection (CCDI), the party's internal disciplinary body, and the National Supervisory Commission, the highest anti-corruption agency of China. Including Du Zi, five party secretaries of the Tongliao were investigated. The other four are: Mo Jiancheng, Fu Tiegang, Song Liang, and Li Jiexiang. Yun Guangzhong, his successor in Ordos, was sacked for graft in June 2019. His colleague Xing Yun, vice chairman of the Inner Mongolia Regional People's Congress from 2012 to 2016, was put under investigation in October 2018. Du has been expelled from the Communist Party on 7 October 2024. On October 17, he was arrested on suspicion of taking bribes as per a decision made by the Supreme People's Procuratorate.

On 22 January 2025, Du was indicted on suspicion of accepting bribes. On May 16, he stood trial at the Intermediate People's Court of Shenyang on charges of taking bribes. According to the indictment, he used his various positions between 2002 and 2015 in Inner Mongolia to help individuals and entities with business operations and project contracting and in return, he illegally accepted money and goods worth over 81.91 million yuan ($12 million), directly or through his relatives. On July 29, he received a sentence of 15 years in prison and fine of 8 million yuan for taking bribes, all property gained from the bribery would be turned over to the national treasury.

Government offices
Preceded by Liu Jin	Mayor of Ordos; 2007–2008	Succeeded by Yun Guangzhong
Party political offices
Preceded by Yun Feng	Communist Party Secretary of Ordos; 2008–2011	Succeeded by Yun Guangzhong
Preceded by Fu Tiegang	Communist Party Secretary of Tongliao; 2011–2015	Succeeded by Song Liang
Assembly seats
Preceded by Yun Feng	Chairman of the Ordos Municipal People's Congress; 2008–2011	Succeeded by Yun Guangzhong
