= Chen Xu (disambiguation) =

Chen Xu is the personal name of Emperor Xuan of Chen (陳宣帝)

Other people with this name:

- Chen Xu (diplomat), Chinese diplomat, former Chinese Ambassador to the Netherlands.
- Chen Xu (geologist), Chinese geologist, member of the Chinese Academy of Sciences.
- Chen Xu (prosecutor) (陈旭) (born 1952), former Chinese prosecutor who served as the Prosecutor General of Shanghai People's Procuratorate from 2008 to 2016.
- Chen Xu (politician) (陈旭) (born 1963), Chinese politician, deputy head of the United Front Work Department, former communist party secretary of Tsinghua University.
- Chen Xu (footballer) (陈旭) (born 1985), Chinese retired association footballer

== See also ==
- Xu Chen (disambiguation)
