= Song Liang =

Chinese politician

- 宋亮

Executive Vice Governor of Gansu
- In office June 2018 – 1 February 2021
- Governor: Tang Renjian; Ren Zhenhe
- Preceded by: Huang Qiang
- Succeeded by: Shi Moujun

Communist Party Secretary of Tongliao
- In office November 2016 – March 2017
- Preceded by: Luo Yonggang
- Succeeded by: Li Jiexiang

Communist Party Secretary of Wuhai
- In office November 2015 – November 2016
- Preceded by: Hou Fengqi
- Succeeded by: Shi Wanjun

Head of the Department of Transportation of Inner Mongolia Autonomous Region
- In office May 2014 – November 2015
- Preceded by: Jiang Wei
- Succeeded by: Lian Su

Personal details
- Born: December 1963 (age 62) Shangdu County, Inner Mongolia, China
- Party: Chinese Communist Party (1990–2021; expelled)
- Education: Inner Mongolia University; Nankai University

Song Liang (Chinese: 宋亮; pinyin: Sòng Liàng; born December 1963) is a former Chinese politician who spent most of his career in north China's Inner Mongolia. As of February 2021 he was under investigation by Central Commission for Discipline Inspection. Previously he served as the Executive Vice Governor of Gansu. Song was the second leader of provincial-ministerial level to be targeted in 2021, after Li Wenxi, former vice chairman of the Liaoning Provincial Committee of the Chinese People's Political Consultative Conference.

== Early life and education ==
Song was born in Shangdu County, Inner Mongolia, in December 1963. In September 1981, he was admitted to Inner Mongolia University, where he majored in plan statistics.

== Career in Inner Mongolia ==
After graduating in July 1985, he was dispatched to the Planning Committee of Inner Mongolia Autonomous Region as an official. Nine years later, he was transferred to the General Office of the Government of Inner Mongolia Autonomous Region, where he eventually became its deputy director in June 2000. He concurrently held the deputy director of Financial Work Office in June 2003, rising to director in one year later. In August 2011, he was transferred to Chifeng, a prefecture-level city rich in mineral resources, and appointed Chinese Communist Party Deputy Committee Secretary. More than two years later, he was appointed head of the Department of Transportation of Inner Mongolia Autonomous Region, concurrently holding the Chinese Communist Party Committee Secretary position. In November 2005, he was transferred to Wuhai, which has an abundance of coal, and appointed CCP Committee Secretary. His predecessor, Hou Fengqi, was sacked for graft in the same month. In November 2016, he was transferred again to Tongliao and appointed party chief, and promoted to member of the standing committee of the Inner Mongolia Autonomous Regional Committee of the Chinese Communist Party, the region's top authority.

== Career in Gansu ==
In March 2017, he rose to become vice governor of Gansu, an economically backward province in northwest China. He was also a member of the standing committee of the Gansu Chinese Communist Party (CCP) committee, the province's top authority. In June 2018, he was promoted again to become executive vice governor of Gansu, a position he held until January 2021. As executive vice governor, he was responsible for forestry, grassland and natural resources. He was involved in the massive shelterbelt destruction at the state owned Dunhuang Yangguan Forest Farm (敦煌阳关林场) or cases of cutting down thriving forests for grape planting, which made headlines nationwide for the severe damage caused to the Protection Forest in northwest China.

== Downfall ==
On February 1, 2021, he was put under investigation for alleged "serious violations of discipline and laws" by the Central Commission for Discipline Inspection (CCDI), the CCP's internal disciplinary body, and the National Supervisory Commission, the highest anti-corruption agency of China. On August 15, he was expelled from the CCP and dismissed from public office. On October 7, he was indicted on suspicion of accepting bribes.

On August 30, 2022, he was sentenced by the Intermediate People's Court of Leshan to life in prison on charges of taking bribes. He was also deprived of his political rights for life and ordered by the court to have all his personal assets confiscated and turn over all illicit gains and their interests to the state. He took advantage of his former positions in Inner Mongolia and Gansu between 2000 and 2020 to assist others in the establishment of village banks, obtaining loans, job adjustment, business operations and other matters, in return, he illegally accepted cash, equity and real estate worth approximately 79.68 million yuan (11.6 million U.S. dollars) in total.

Government offices
Preceded by Jiang Wei (江维)	Head of the Department of Transportation of Inner Mongolia Autonomous Region; 2014–2015	Succeeded by Lian Su
Preceded by Huang Qiang	Executive Vice Governor of Gansu; 2018–2021	Succeeded by Shi Moujun
Party political offices
Preceded by Hou Fengqi	Communist Party Secretary of Wuhai; 2015–2016	Succeeded by Shi Wanjun
Preceded by Luo Yonggang	Communist Party Secretary of Tongliao; 2016–2017	Succeeded by Li Jiexiang
