= Officials implicated by the anti-corruption campaign in China =

In 2012, the Central Commission for Discipline Inspection of China began to implicate officials in an anti-corruption campaign, the articles about these have been split by year:

- Officials implicated by the anti-corruption campaign in China (2012–2017)
- Officials implicated by the anti-corruption campaign in China (2017–2022)
- Officials implicated by the anti-corruption campaign in China (2022–)
