= Shelterbelt destruction at Yangguan Forest Farm =

Environmental controversy in China

On January 20, 2021, Economic Information Daily, a publication under China’s state-run Xinhua News Agency, reported on the shelterbelt destruction at Yangguan Forest Farm. Located in Dunhuang, Gansu Province, the Yangguan Forest Farm is part of the Great Green Wall. Given the public’s growing attention in recent years to afforestation and desertification prevention efforts, the report sparked intense public discussion.

Prior to this, as early as 2001, China’s official media had already reported on the destruction of the forest farm. The Central Environmental Protection Inspection Team had received complaints regarding the situation, and environmental protection organizations had also filed lawsuits. However, these efforts failed to resolve the issue.

Following the publication of the report, the Gansu Provincial People's Government established an investigation team on January 20 and released its findings on January 26, stating that only isolated instances of illegal logging had occurred. However, the very next day, Economic Information Daily published a follow-up article revealing three relevant documents, questioning the credibility of the forest farm and the provincial authorities.

On January 28, the Central Ecological and Environmental Protection Inspection Office dispatched a team to Dunhuang to conduct an on-site investigation. Subsequently, on March 19, a joint investigation team composed of central government ministries released its final report. The report confirmed management issues at the forest farm while also overturning the data presented in the documents published earlier by Economic Information Daily. (Note: Jing Daily is an English language online publication based in New York City which focuses on luxury consumer trends in China and Asia.)

== Background ==
=== Grape industry in Dunhuang ===
See also: Red Globe grape

The history of grape production and transportation in Dunhuang dates back to the Western Han dynasty, when Zhang Qianopened up the Western Regions. Grapes were gradually introduced into the zhongyuan through Dunhuang. By the Northern Wei Dynasty, records show that large-scale grape cultivation had already taken place in the region. In 1998, Dunhuang Grape Wine Co., Ltd. was established. From September 6 to 8, 2008, the local government of Dunhuang held the "First China·Dunhuang Grape Culture Festival" to promote the development of the grape industry through the event. At the same time, Dunhuang proposed to establish a grape production base in Northwest China and registered the "Yangguan" and "Dunhuang" grape brands. Its seedless white grapes and Red Globe grapes were recognized as "Famous Chinese Fruits" by the Grape Branch of the Chinese Society of Agriculture. In 2009, the total area under grape cultivation in Dunhuang reached 0.438 million hectares, of which 0.425 million hectares were primarily planted with seedless white and Red Globe varieties. The total grape output was 67.03 million kilograms, generating an output value of 151.86 million yuan. By 2010, the total grape cultivation area in the city had increased to 0.54 million hectares, with a total production of 70.89 million kilograms.

In 2020, the Dunhuang Municipal People’s Government stepped up efforts to promote the local grape industry. The official Weibo account "@Dunhuang Release" published a total of 20 posts related to Dunhuang grapes that year.

=== Previous reports ===
In 2001, People’s Daily Online reprinted an article titled "Thousands of Acres of Shelter Forest in Dunhuang Felled by Axes", reporting that over 3,000 shelter trees were cut down without felling permits, and the cleared land was subsequently converted into vineyards. In 2006, China Economic Times published an article titled "Dunhuang, Do Not Repeat the Tragedy of Loulan", warning against ecological mismanagement. In 2011, Gansu Forestry magazine featured an article titled "Desert Becomes Oasis: A Record of Yangguan Forest Farm in Dunhuang Preventing Eastward Desertification", highlighting afforestation efforts in the region.n March 2017, in response to media coverage, the Jiuquan Municipal Forestry Bureau issued a report titled "Investigation on Media-Reported Deforestation and Land Reclamation within the Yangguan Forest Farm in Dunhuang", addressing concerns over deforestation and land use changes.

=== Previous complaints ===
Between 2016 and 2017, the Seventh Central Environmental Protection Inspection Team received ten complaints concerning the Yangguan Forest Farm.

In 2019, the China Biodiversity Conservation and Green Development Foundation (CBCGDF) filed a lawsuit against the Dunhuang Yangguan Forest Farm and Dunhuang Wine Company at the Gansu Mining District. The court proposed mediation between the parties; however, CBCGDF believed that mediation would not lead to effective ecological restoration.

== Timeline ==
Date	Progress
January 20	The Economic Information Daily published an article titled "Ten Thousand Acres of Desert Shelter Forest Destroyed: Dunhuang’s Last Barrier Against Desertification on the Verge of Collapse."
January 20	The People's Government of Gansu Province announced that the city of Dunhuang had established a special task force to investigate the issue.
January 20	The provincial government of Gansu formed an investigation team led by Vice Governor Liu Changgen, which departed for the Yangguan Forest Farm that same afternoon.
January 21	The Office of the Central Ecological and Environmental Protection Inspectorate dispatched personnel to Dunhuang to conduct an on-site investigation.
January 26	The People's Government of Gansu Province held a press conference to announce the findings of the provincial investigation team.
January 27	Xinhua News Agency published a follow-up article disclosing related official documents.
January 28	The Ministry of Ecology and Environment announced that the investigation conducted by the Central Environmental Inspectorate was largely complete.
March 19	A joint investigation team released the final results of the inquiry.

== First report ==
On January 20, 2021, Economic Information Daily, a publication affiliated with Xinhua News Agency, published an article titled “Ten Thousand Acres of Desert Shelter Forest Destroyed—Dunhuang’s Final Defense Against Desertification Near Collapse.” The article sparked widespread public concern and intense debate. According to the report, Yangguan Forest Farm in Dunhuang—part of the “Three-North Shelter Forest Program”—had undergone extensive clear-cutting described as a “scalping” operation. Over 10,000 mu of protective forest had been reduced to almost nothing, forming a corridor approximately 5 kilometers wide, which allowed sand and dust from the Kumtag Desert to blow directly into Dunhuang. Based on on-site investigations by the newspaper’s journalists, the cleared land had been converted into vineyards, “with even the potential to fully replace the forest.” Since grape cultivation requires large amounts of irrigation and thrives in soil conditions similar to those of deserts, the report warned that the Yangguan Forest Farm might “be buried by desert sands,” thereby exacerbating the risk of desertification. The journalists also discovered that, although the forest farm contained extensive areas of nationally and provincially designated public welfare forests, the signs indicating such status were “systematically smashed or removed,” appearing to be a deliberate attempt to erase the memory of the land’s protected nature. Furthermore, the article revealed that both the forest farm and local government had been covering up the large-scale tree cutting. The felled trees were “in the vast majority healthy and vigorously growing.” Some desert poplars were found “with their bark stripped” or even “charred,” seemingly to fabricate the appearance of natural death. Despite this, both the Dunhuang Forestry Bureau and the forest farm insisted that “no illegal logging had occurred,” claiming instead that the tree removal was merely part of a “low-quality forest transformation” project.

== Escalation of the incident ==
As of January 25, the number of online posts related to the public outcry surrounding the incident had reached 678,900 entries across the internet, with a peak volume of 415,800 entries recorded on January 23.

On January 21, People’s Daily Online published a commentary titled “Ten Thousand Acres of Desert Shelter Forest Destroyed—This Must Be Thoroughly Investigated!” The article emphasized that Yangguan Forest Farm serves as a critical ecological barrier and reported that the Gansu Provincial Party Committee and Provincial Government had dispatched an investigation team to Dunhuang. It also noted that media attention had already been drawn to Yangguan Forest Farm as early as 2017, and the recurrence of such attention now demands a deeper inquiry by relevant authorities.

On January 23, the official Weibo account of People’s Daily posted a commentary stating: “To protect Dunhuang, one must first protect Yangguan.” The post immediately resonated with the emotions of netizens. As of January 30, the post had been reposted 49,317 times. Most of the reposts and comments expressed emotions of anger and sorrow, with many netizens calling for "severe punishment" and a "thorough investigation." The post triggered a “minor peak” in public opinion on January 24, generating 127,500 related posts on that day alone.

The proportion of sensitive information across the web surged to 94.99% on the day Economic Information Dailypublished its article. It stood at 83.31% on January 21, dropped to 61.04% on the 22nd, rose again to 73.38% on the 23rd, and was 70.98% and 63.39% on the 24th and 25th respectively. Following the official announcement from the Gansu Provincial Government on January 26, the proportion of sensitive content fell to 48.24%, and further decreased to 45.76% on January 27.

== Gansu province investigation report ==
External images
- Satellite image provided by the Dunhuang Municipal Government to Legal Daily reporters
- "The current land type distribution map of Yangguan Forest Farm in Dunhuang in 2009". Ministry of Ecology and Environment of the People's Republic of ChinaSatellite Center. "Current land type distribution map of Yangguan Forest Farm in Dunhuang in 2020". Ministry of Ecology and Environment of the People's Republic of ChinaSatellite Center.

On January 20, 2021, the Gansu Provincial Government established an investigation team led by Vice Governor Liu Changgen, which departed that afternoon to conduct an on-site investigation at the Yangguan Forest Farm.

=== Issues related to Yangguan Forest Farm ===
On the morning of January 26, the investigation team held a press conference regarding the “Yangguan Deforestation Incident.” It acknowledged that management of the forest farm had been extensive and lacking in precision but affirmed that the two oases in Dunhuang had not been threatened. After analyzing historical satellite remote sensing data and reviewing national land survey data from 1999, 2009, and 2019, the team found no evidence of large-scale deforestation since the year 2000.

Remote sensing imagery from 2018 to 2019 indicated three suspicious areas of potential forest damage totaling approximately 42.98 mu (approx. 2.87 hectares). Upon on-site verification, the team concluded that these changes were primarily due to infrastructure upgrades at the forest farm, such as the construction of gravel roads, U-shaped irrigation ditches, and the installation of irrigation pipelines. No evidence was found of tree felling for vineyard expansion.

Regarding the vineyard issue, the team reported that satellite imagery showed an expansion of 400 mu of vineyard land in 2012 as part of low-quality forest conversion. No further expansion was detected thereafter. These findings are consistent with national land survey data from 1999, 2009, and 2019.

As for the change in public welfare forest classification, the investigation team explained that approximately 5,500 mu of forest in Yangguan had exceeded 50 years of age and showed signs of significant aging. According to the Implementation Rules for Forest Land Demarcation in Gansu Province (2012), these were reclassified in 2013 as local public welfare forests and thus no longer eligible for national subsidies. From 2012 to 2020, Yangguan Forest Farm carried out forest renovation in accordance with the Forestry Law and technical standards such as the Technical Regulations for the Transformation of Low-Efficiency Forests. During this period, the farm applied for 29 timber harvesting permits from the former Dunhuang Forestry Bureau and harvested a total of 8,827 trees, covering an area of 105 mu.

In response to media reports claiming that Dunhuang is once again under threat from sandstorms, the investigation team cited satellite data to confirm that there has been no significant change in the area or vegetation coverage of the Yangguan Oasis since 2009.

On the other hand, the investigation team stated that there were several management issues at the Yangguan Forest Farm. These included irregularities in tree tending practices, inadequate oversight of forest renewal and logging activities, insufficient efforts in water conservation, as well as problems with unauthorized leasing and poor internal coordination. The team cited specific instances, such as the unauthorized actions of certain workers who cut down more than ten roadside trees (with an estimated standing timber volume of about 3 cubic meters) that were not completely dead. The cut surfaces clearly showed signs of living tissue. In addition, the team discovered two charred tree trunk remnants, and this matter is currently under investigation by the municipal authorities in Dunhuang.

=== Issues related to Feitian company ===
The investigation team also noted that the development interests of Dunhuang Feitian Company conflicted with the interests of local communities and the requirements of ecological conservation. Despite multiple attempts by provincial and municipal task forces to guide the company in correcting its issues and resolving conflicts, Feitian Company failed to make adequate rectifications or fully resolve the disputes.

The investigation revealed that, in order to develop its fish farming industry, Feitian Company constructed projects in the upper reaches of the Xitugou area above the Yangguan Forest Farm, including flood control dams, Moon Lake, Jiulian Lake, and thirteen flood prevention embankments. These works diverted and blocked the Xitugou River, resulting in the burial of downstream overflow springs by wind-blown sand, thereby affecting the water supply to the Yangguan Forest Farm. The investigation team stated that some of these projects were located within the Yangguan Nature Reserve and at the site of the Yangguan ruins, in violation of regulations related to the management of nature reserves and cultural heritage, and thus constituted illegal and non-compliant construction activities. These issues were also raised in feedback from the Ministry of Ecology and Environment-led Central Ecological and Environmental Protection Inspections, as well as in audits conducted by the National Audit Office under the programs for assessing the economic responsibilities of provincial leadership and the audit of natural resource asset management. During both the first round of central environmental inspections in 2016 and the second round in 2019 in Gansu Province, the inspection teams received multiple complaints about Feitian Company and referred them to local authorities for investigation.However, no substantive follow-up action has been taken to date.

In addition, an official from the Dunhuang municipal government told a reporter from Legal Daily that the media storm triggered by the recent report was orchestrated behind the scenes by Feitian Company, with the aim of pressuring the government to secure higher compensation.

== Renewed controversy ==
=== Xinhua issues a follow-up report ===
On January 27, 2021, Xinhua News Agency republished an article from Economic Information Daily titled “The Dunhuang Deforestation Case: 13,300 Mu or 6,000 Mu? Images Reveal the Truth.”In this report, Economic Information Daily presented three key documents: a 1997 feasibility report for vineyard development submitted by the forest farm, a 2004 restructuring proposal, and a 2016 explanatory document issued in response to the Central Environmental Protection Inspection team (which cited the 2004 proposal). These documents indicated that the area of the protective forest was 14,000 mu, 13,300 mu, and 13,300 mu respectively—casting doubt on the accuracy of the figures provided by the forest farm and Gansu provincial authorities.As a result, the controversy took on the characteristics of a “Rashomon” situation—multiple conflicting accounts with no clear truth.

=== Public reaction intensifies ===
The second report by Economic Information Daily reignited public debate, with many internet users asserting that one party must be lying and should be publicly exposed. Some voices noted that terms like “protective forest” and “ecological forest” have never been clearly defined. Others speculated that the forest farm might have exaggerated the forest area in order to obtain state subsidies designated for public welfare forests, or that the discrepancies were the result of disorganized local land management and poor interdepartmental coordination. In addition, as the report revealed that forested land had been converted into vineyards—despite grapes not being listed as a recommended species in the Technical Specifications for the Construction of Ecological Public Welfare Forests—some internet users began to question whether Dunhuang was suitable for grape cultivation at all. There were even calls to “boycott grapes from Gansu.”

On January 29, 2021, the Public Opinion Channel of People’s Daily Online published a commentary titled “To Move Beyond the Rashomon of the Dunhuang Deforestation Incident, Two Key Issues Must Be Addressed.” The article argued that the controversy had evolved beyond the simple question of whether the forest had been destroyed. It now encompassed broader issues such as long-term local ecological governance, land management practices, environmental public interest litigation, and external oversight.

== Investigation by central government authorities ==
On January 28, 2021, under the leadership of Vice Minister Zhai Qing, the Central Office for Ecological and Environmental Protection Inspection dispatched a team to Dunhuang for an on-site investigation. On March 19, 2021, a joint investigation team composed of the Ministry of Natural Resources, the Ministry of Ecology and Environment, and the National Forestry and Grassland Administration released its findings. The investigation concluded that the legitimate jurisdiction of Yangguan Forest Farm covered only 11,600 mu in the southwestern area, overturning previously reported figures. The team determined that compared with data from 1990, over the past 30 years, arbor forest land in the southwestern section had decreased by 3,850.59 mu, shrubland increased by 518.93 mu, and orchard-type land such as vineyards increased by 3,547.5 mu. The investigation team also identified the following issues at Yangguan Forest Farm:

- The forest farm was found to have engaged in illegal activities such as deforestation and logging without permits.
  - Between 2004 and 2012, the Dunhuang municipal government and forestry bureau unlawfully approved projects by Dunhuang Winery Co., Ltd. (hereafter referred to as "Dunhuang Winery") within Yangguan Forest Farm, including the construction of a desert forest park and the cultivation of jujube trees and grape varietal gardens. (Note: "Reply on the Issues Concerning the Investment and Construction of Dunhuang Yangguan Desert Forest Park by Gansu Dunhuang Wine Industry Co., Ltd." (Dunzhengbanfa [2014] No. 50))Between 2013 and 2014, the company cleared 567 mu of forest for the cultivation of grapes (400 mu) and jujubes (167 mu).
  - Since 2013, construction of gravel roads and other infrastructure within the forest farm resulted in the unauthorized occupation of 99.85 mu of forest land. (Note: This behavior does not comply with the provisions of the 2009 version of the Forest Law, but complies with the provisions of the current Forest Law.)
  - On-site inspections revealed seven roadside shelterbelts had been illegally logged without permits. The replanting and restoration efforts were inadequate, resulting in sparse vegetation and visible gaps. Since 2010, 604 trees had been illegally felled by villagers and cases had been filed for investigation.
- Decline in the Quality of Shelter Forests；pproximately 600 mu of poplar shelter forests located in the southern part of the forest farm suffered significant degradation due to water shortages, with around 200 mu of trees having died from drought.
- Improper Reclassification of National Public Welfare Forests；Between 2012 and 2013, the Dunhuang Municipal Forestry Bureau and other relevant forestry authorities failed to perform rigorous review and oversight, resulting in the entire 5,500 mu of national public welfare forest within the forest farm being reclassified as local public welfare forest, in violation of regulatory procedures.
- Misappropriation of National Forest Ecological Benefit Compensation Funds；From 2013 to 2018, despite the forest farm no longer holding any national public welfare forests, the Dunhuang Forestry Bureau and the Finance Bureau unlawfully allocated ¥260,000 in national forest ecological benefit compensation funds to Yangguan Forest Farm.
- Illegal Contracting of Forest Land to Enterprises；From 2007 to 2011, the forest farm contracted out 5,000 mu of land to three private companies. However, due to the companies’ failure to comply with contract terms, Dunhuang authorities terminated the agreements between 2014 and 2017 and reclaimed 4,433 mu of the land. Nevertheless, the land-use rights for the remaining 567 mu were not officially reclaimed until February 22, 2021, following the conclusion of this investigation.

== Follow-up actions ==
On March 17,2021, the National Forestry and Grassland Administration launched a nationwide special campaign to combat deforestation. The campaign was scheduled to be carried out intensively from March through December.

In response, the Office of the Leading Group for the Reform of State-Owned Forest Farms in Gansu Province issued the "Notice on Carrying Out the Inspection and Rectification of State-Owned Forest Farms," calling for lessons to be drawn from the issues exposed during the recent incident and urging comprehensive rectification efforts across the province. The initiative officially commenced in Zhangye City on April 9.
