= Xu Chen (disambiguation) =

Xu Chen (徐晨) is Chinese badminton player

Xu Chen may also refer to:

- Xu Chen (footballer) (徐辰), Chinese association footballer

== See also ==
- Chen Xu (disambiguation)
