= Hou Fengqi =

Chinese politician

- 侯凤岐

Communist Party Secretary of Wuhai
- In office May 2013 – November 2015
- Preceded by: Bao Changqing
- Succeeded by: Song Liang

Mayor of Wuhai
- In office January 2009 – May 2013
- Preceded by: Bai Xiangqun
- Succeeded by: Bao Gang

Personal details
- Born: March 1962 (age 64) Fugu County, Shaanxi, China
- Party: Chinese Communist Party
- Spouse: Yang Xiu'e
- Education: Baotou Junior Normal College; Huazhong University of Science and Technology

Hou Fengqi (simplified Chinese: 侯凤岐; traditional Chinese: 侯鳳岐; pinyin: Hòu Fèngqí; born March 1962) is a former Chinese politician who spent most of his career in the cities of Bayannur and Wuhai, in north China's Inner Mongolia. He was investigated by the Central Commission for Discipline Inspection in November 2015. Previously he served as Chinese Communist Party Committee Secretary of Wuhai. In October 2017, he was sentenced to 17 years for accepting bribes and holding a huge amount of property from an unidentified source.

== Career ==
Born in March 1962, he studied and then worked as Secretary of Youth League Branch at Baotou Junior Normal College. From August 1983 to September 1989 he worked in the 208 geological prospecting brigade of Baotou Nuclear Industry. In September 1989 he was accepted to Huazhong University of Science and Technology and graduated in July 1991. After graduation, he was assigned to the Propaganda Department of CHINADA Inner Mongolia Committee, where he worked there until June 1996. In June 1996 he was vice-mayor of Linhe, two years later he was promoted to become deputy secretary-general of Bayannur. He was a member of the CHINADA Bayannur Standing Committee and Chinese Communist Party Committee Secretary of Linhe District from July 2004 to November 2006. Then he was promoted to become executive vice-mayor, a position he held until February 2008, when he was transferred to Wuhai and appointed Chinese Communist Party Deputy Committee Secretary. In May 2013 he became the CCP Committee Secretary, and served until November 2015.

== Downfall ==
On November 20, 2015, he was suspected of "serious violations of discipline", said one-sentence statement issued by the ruling Chinese Communist Party's internal control body, the Central Commission for Discipline Inspection (CCDI). On November 26, he was removed from his posts for involvement in corruption.

In October 2017, he was sentenced to 17 years for accepting bribes and holding a huge amount of property from an unidentified source. Hou's wife Yang Xiu'e (杨秀娥) was also sentenced to 3 years. His superior Bai Xiangqun was put under investigation in April 2018.

Government offices
Preceded by Bai Xiangqun	Mayor of Wuhai; 2009–2013	Succeeded by Bao Gang
Party political offices
Preceded by Bao Changqing (鲍常青)	Communist Party Secretary of Wuhai; 2013–2015	Succeeded by Song Liang (宋亮)
