= Feng Xinzhu =

Chinese politician (born 1960)

- 冯新柱

Director of Management Committee of Yangling Agricultural Hi-tech Industries Demonstration Zone
- In office July 2016 – January 2018
- Preceded by: Zhu Lieke
- Succeeded by: Wei Zengjun

Vice Governor of Shaanxi
- In office April 2015 – January 2018
- Governor: Lou Qinjian→Hu Heping

Chairman of the Standing Committee of the Tongchuan People's Congress
- In office April 2011 – April 2015
- Preceded by: Wu Qianjin
- Succeeded by: Guo Dawei

Communist Party Secretary of Tongchuan
- In office January 2011 – April 2015
- Preceded by: Wu Qianjin
- Succeeded by: Guo Dawei

Mayor of Tongchuan
- In office September 2004 – January 2011
- Preceded by: Wu Qianjin
- Succeeded by: Wang Lixia

Personal details
- Born: July 1960 (age 66) Yang County, Shaanxi
- Party: Chinese Communist Party (1985-2018, expelled)
- Education: Central Party School of the Chinese Communist Party; Northwest University

Feng Xinzhu (simplified Chinese: 冯新柱; traditional Chinese: 馮新柱; pinyin: Féng Xīnzhù; born July 1960) is a Chinese former politician who served as Vice Governor of Shaanxi. He was dismissed from his position in January 2018 and placed under investigation by the Chinese Communist Party's Central Commission for Discipline Inspection. He became the first high-ranking official ("tiger") taken down in the year of 2018.

== Career ==
Feng Xinzhu was born in July 1960, and he was entered to Xi'an Statistics School in 1979. In 1981, he started to work at Shaanxi Township Enterprises Supply And Marketing Company (陕西省乡镇企业供销公司), then he moved to Shaanxi Rural Electricity Administration since 1989, and he promoted to deputy director in 1996.

In 2001, Feng was appointed as the Deputy Mayor of Tongchuan, then he promoted to Mayor in 2004. He was appointed as the Chinese Communist Party Committee Secretary of Tongchuan in 2011.

In 2015, Feng was appointed as the Vice Governor of Shaanxi.

== Investigation ==
On January 3, 2018, Feng was placed under investigation by the Central Commission for Discipline Inspection, the party's internal disciplinary body, for "serious violations of regulations". On January 21, his qualification for delegate to the 12th Shaanxi People's Congress was terminated. He is expelled from the Chinese Communist Party and removed from public office on March 31, 2018. "Feng had accumulated a huge amount of assets which it suspected were bribes and promoted officials at the request of private companies", the Central Commission for Discipline Inspection said in a statement on its website.

On January 17, his trial was held at the Intermediate People's Court in the Intermediate People's Court of Hangzhou. Prosecutors accused Feng of taking advantage of his former positions in Shaanxi between 1999 and 2017 to seek profits for certain organizations and individuals in project investment, mineral development, capital lending, project contracting and job adjustment. In return, he accepted money and property worth more than 70.47 million yuan (about 10.41 million U.S. dollars). On May 14, Feng was sentenced on 15 years in prison and fined 7 million yuan ($1.02 million). Feng was charged with accepting bribes worth 70.47 million yuan (about 10.41 million U.S. dollars), by the Intermediate People's Court of Hangzhou.

Government offices
Preceded by Wu Qianjin	Mayor of Tongchuan; 2004–2011	Succeeded by Wang Lixia
Preceded by Zhu Lieke	Director of Management Committee of Yangling Agricultural Hi-tech Industries Demonstration Zone; 2016–2018	Succeeded by Wei Zengjun
Party political offices
Preceded by Wu Qianjin	Communist Party Secretary of Tongchuan; 2011–2015	Succeeded by Guo Dawei
Assembly seats
Preceded by Wu Qianjin	Chairman of the Standing Committee of the Tongchuan People's Congress; 2011–2015	Succeeded by Guo Dawei
