= Yangling District =

Yangling 杨陵区
- District
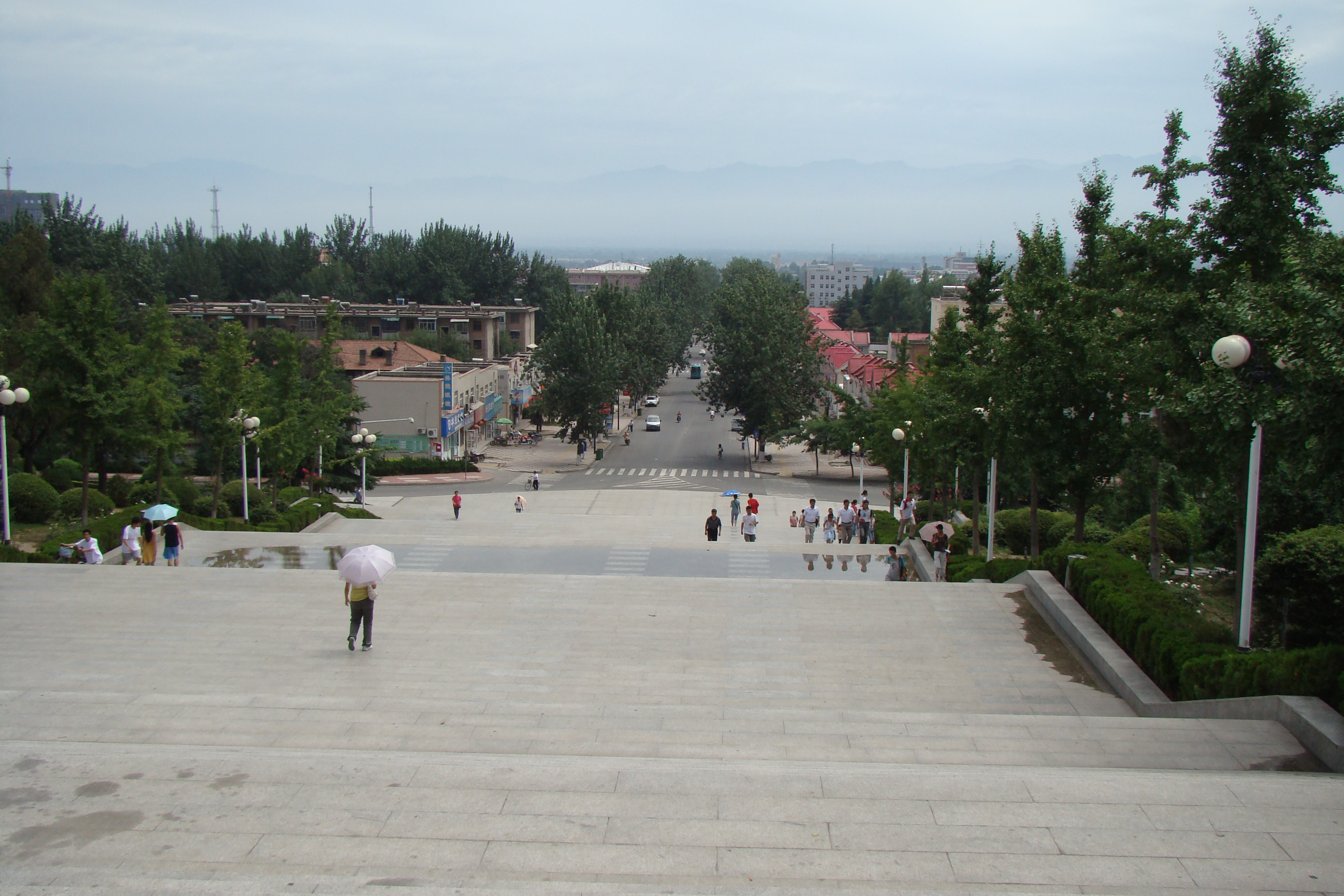

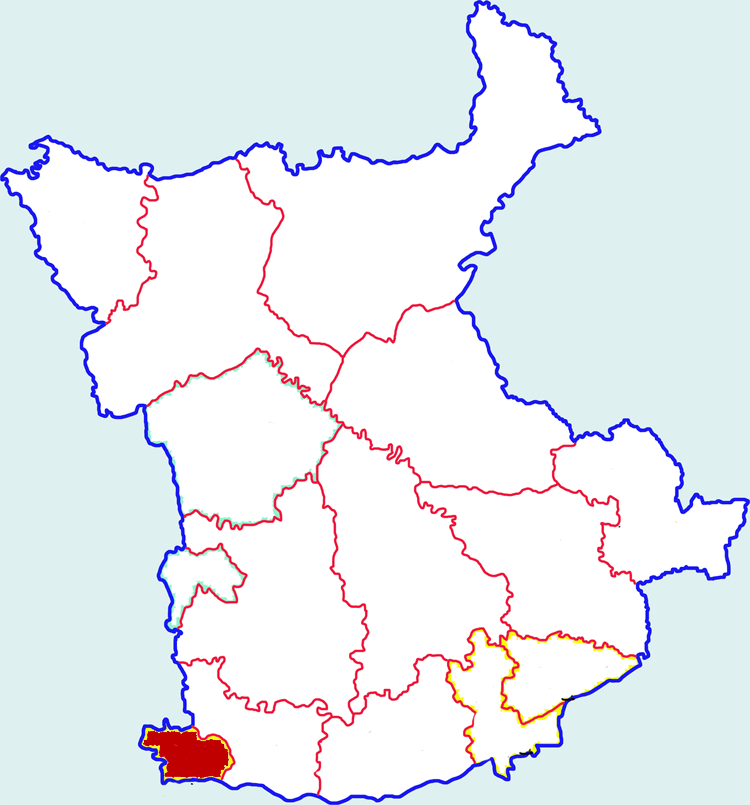
- Yangling in Xianyang

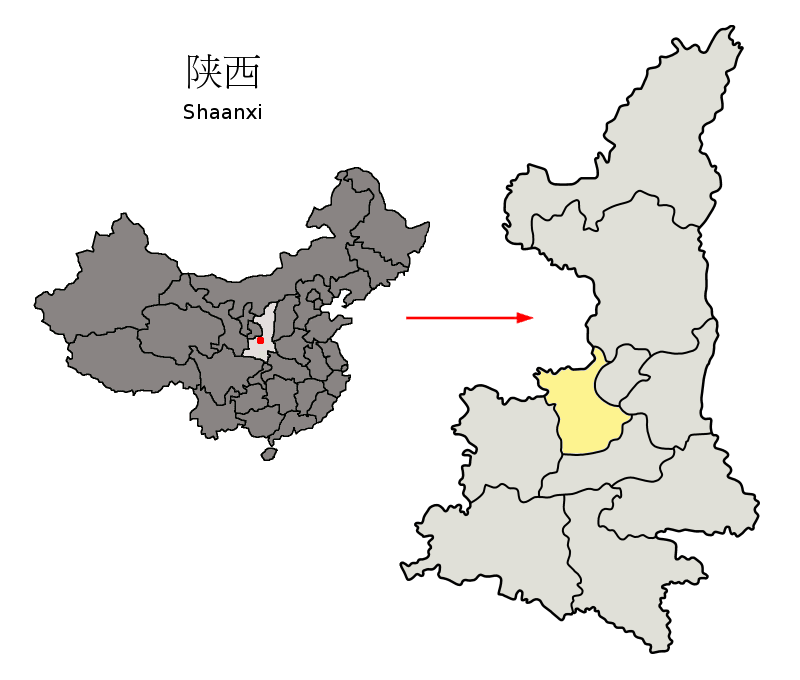
- Xianyang in Shaanxi
- Coordinates: 34°17′00″N 108°03′42″E
- Country: People's Republic of China
- Province: Shaanxi
- Prefecture-level city: Xianyang
- Township-level divisions: 2 subdistricts 3 towns
- District seat: Yangling Subdistrict (杨陵街道)

Area
  - Total: 135 km^{2} (52 sq mi)

Population (2017)
  - Total: 206,400
  - Density: 1,530/km^{2} (3,960/sq mi)
- Time zone: UTC+8 (China Standard)
- Postal code: 712100
- Area code: 0029
- Website: www.ylq.gov.cn

Yangling District (simplified Chinese: 杨陵区; traditional Chinese: 楊陵區; pinyin: Yánglíng Qū) is a district of the city of Xianyang, Shaanxi province, People's Republic of China, located on the plains of Wei River (Guanzhong). It has an area of 94 square kilometres (36 sq mi) and a population of 155,000. The district is roughly 80 kilometres (50 mi) to the west of the provincial capital Xi'an.

== History ==
Yangling received its name as the family burial site of founding emperor Yang Jian (楊堅) of the Sui dynasty.

Starting in 1979, Yangling went through several administrative region changes until it became a district to the City of Xianyang in 1983. In 1997 the Yangling High Tech Agriculture Sector Demonstration District was established in Yangling District as a testing ground for new agriculture technology and techniques.

== Administrative divisions ==
As of 2016, this District is divided to 2 subdistricts and 3 towns.

Subdistricts

- Yangling Subdistrict (杨陵街道)
- Litai Subdistrict (李台街道)

Towns

- Wuquan (五泉镇)
- Dazhai (大寨镇)
- Rougu (揉谷镇)

== Climate ==
Climate data for Yangling District, elevation 506 m (1,660 ft), (1991–2020 normals, extremes 1991–present)
Month	Jan	Feb	Mar	Apr	May	Jun	Jul	Aug	Sep	Oct	Nov	Dec	Year
Record high °C (°F)	15.6 (60.1)	22.5 (72.5)	29.8 (85.6)	33.2 (91.8)	36.1 (97.0)	38.7 (101.7)	41.9 (107.4)	38.1 (100.6)	35.2 (95.4)	30.4 (86.7)	23.7 (74.7)	18.8 (65.8)	41.9 (107.4)
Mean daily maximum °C (°F)	4.9 (40.8)	8.6 (47.5)	15.8 (60.4)	21.7 (71.1)	26.1 (79.0)	30.7 (87.3)	31.9 (89.4)	29.8 (85.6)	24.4 (75.9)	19.0 (66.2)	12.3 (54.1)	6.9 (44.4)	19.3 (66.8)
Daily mean °C (°F)	−0.6 (30.9)	3.0 (37.4)	9.5 (49.1)	15.1 (59.2)	19.5 (67.1)	24.4 (75.9)	26.4 (79.5)	24.6 (76.3)	19.4 (66.9)	13.8 (56.8)	7.0 (44.6)	1.1 (34.0)	13.6 (56.5)
Mean daily minimum °C (°F)	−4.5 (23.9)	−1.1 (30.0)	4.5 (40.1)	9.6 (49.3)	14.0 (57.2)	18.8 (65.8)	21.7 (71.1)	20.6 (69.1)	15.9 (60.6)	10.1 (50.2)	3.2 (37.8)	−3.0 (26.6)	9.2 (48.5)
Record low °C (°F)	−14.2 (6.4)	−12.0 (10.4)	−5.8 (21.6)	−0.5 (31.1)	5.6 (42.1)	11.9 (53.4)	15.5 (59.9)	13.4 (56.1)	7.5 (45.5)	1.8 (35.2)	−7.2 (19.0)	−11.3 (11.7)	−14.2 (6.4)
Average precipitation mm (inches)	7.1 (0.28)	10.4 (0.41)	24.5 (0.96)	46.4 (1.83)	66.9 (2.63)	75.3 (2.96)	94.6 (3.72)	114.9 (4.52)	131.8 (5.19)	53.3 (2.10)	22.1 (0.87)	2.9 (0.11)	650.2 (25.58)
Average precipitation days (≥ 0.1 mm)	4.4	4.8	6.0	7.4	9.5	8.7	9.8	10.2	12.9	9.7	6.7	2.0	92.1
Average snowy days	3.6	3.3	0.8	0.1	0	0	0	0	0	0	0.8	1.4	10
Average relative humidity (%)	62	64	61	65	66	64	71	77	83	79	74	62	69
Mean monthly sunshine hours	136.8	126.3	180.7	180.9	197.2	192.1	200.6	162.6	109.6	107.4	121.7	162.6	1,878.5
Percentage possible sunshine	43	40	48	46	45	45	46	39	30	31	39	53	42
Source: China Meteorological Administration

== Economy ==
- Industrial Zone
  - Yangling Agriculture Hi-Tech Industrial Zone

Yangling Agriculture Hi-Tech Industrial Zone was approved as a national-level hi-tech development zone by State Council in 1997. It is only 82 kilometres (51 mi) away from Xi'an to the east and 70 kilometres (43 mi) away from Xi'an Xianyang International Airport.

== Tourism ==
Tai Bai Mountains (太白山) are located nearby Yangling district (35–40 km).

== Education ==
Yangling is home to the main campus of Northwest A&F University (NWAFU), established in 1934 by Yang Hucheng (楊虎城) who was the general of the Northwest Army under the Kuomintang.
