= Fu Tiegang =

Chinese politician

- 傅铁钢

Communist Party Secretary of Tongliao
- In office May 2010 – February 2011
- Preceded by: Nashun Menghe
- Succeeded by: Du Zi

Mayor of Tongliao
- In office October 2006 – May 2010
- Preceded by: Nashun Menghe
- Succeeded by: Hudagura

Mayor of Ulanqab
- In office March 2003 – October 2006
- Preceded by: ?
- Succeeded by: Li Wanzhong

Personal details
- Born: 13 April 1953 (age 73) Nehe, Heilongjiang, China
- Party: Chinese Communist Party (1977–2020; expelled)
- Education: Heilongjiang University

Chinese name
- Simplified Chinese: 傅铁钢
- Traditional Chinese: 傅鐵鋼
Transcriptions
Standard Mandarin
- Hanyu Pinyin: Fù Tiěgāng

Fu Tiegang (Chinese: 傅铁钢; born 13 April 1953) is a Chinese former politician who spent his entire career in north China's Inner Mongolia Autonomous Region. As of October 2019, he was under investigation by China's top anti-corruption agency. Previously he served as mayor and Chinese Communist Party Committee Secretary of Tongliao. He was a delegate to the 11th National People's Congress.

== Biography ==
Fu was born in Nehe, Heilongjiang, on 13 April 1953. During the Cultural Revolution, he was a worker at a repair factory in Morin Dawa Daur Autonomous Banner. After resuming the college entrance examination in 1977, he was admitted to Heilongjiang University, majoring in Chinese language and literature. He joined the Chinese Communist Party (CCP) in January 1977.

After university in February 1980, he served in the Organization Department of Morin Dawa Daur Autonomous Banner for a short while before being assigned to the similar position in Hinggan League in November of that same year. He was promoted to be head of the Organization Department of CCP Ulanhot Municipal Committee in November 1984, concurrently holding the deputy party chief position since September 1990. In November 1993, he was appointed party secretary of Jalaid Banner, he remained in that position until May 1997, when he was transferred to Jirim League (now Tongliao) and appointed head of the Organization Department. He was head of the Organization Department of CCP Hulunbuir Municipal Committee in March 2000, and held that office until March 2003, when he despatched to Ulanqab as deputy party secretary and mayor. He served as mayor of Tongliao from October 2006 to May 2010, and party secretary, the top political position in the city, from May 2010 to February 2011. He retired in December 2016.

=== Downfall ===
On 16 October 2019, he has been placed under investigation for "serious violations of discipline and laws" by the Central Commission for Discipline Inspection (CCDI), the party's internal disciplinary body, and the National Supervisory Commission, the highest anti-corruption agency of China.

On 27 February 2020, he was expelled from the Communist Party and later prosecutors signed an arrest order for him. In March, he was indicted on suspicion of accepting bribes. On July 30, he stood trial at the Intermediate People's Court of Baotou on charges of taking bribes. He was charged with accepting 30.84 million yuan, 130,000 US dollars, 140,000 euros and 100,000 Hong Kong dollars, either himself or via his family members. According to the indictment, he allegedly took advantage of his positions to seek benefits for others in business restructuring, project contracting and personnel promotions between 2001 and 2017.

Government offices
Preceded by ?	Mayor of Ulanqab; 2003–2006	Succeeded by Li Wanzhong
Preceded by Nashun Menghe	Mayor of Tongliao; 2007–2010	Succeeded by Hudagura
Party political offices
Preceded by Nashun Menghe	Communist Party Secretary of Tongliao; 2010–2011	Succeeded by Du Zi
