= Zhang Bencai =

Chinese politician

- 张本才

Procurator-General of Shanghai Municipal People's Procuratorate
- In office 29 January 2016 – 1 June 2022
- Preceded by: Chen Xu
- Succeeded by: Chen Yong

Personal details
- Born: May 1967 (age 59) Linyi Prefecture, Shandong, China
- Party: Chinese Communist Party
- Education: Shandong University

Chinese name
- Simplified Chinese: 张本才
- Traditional Chinese: 張本才
Transcriptions
Standard Mandarin
- Hanyu Pinyin: Zhāng Běncái

Zhang Bencai (Chinese: 张本才; born May 1967) is a former Chinese editor and procurator. As of June 2022 he was under investigation by China's top anti-corruption agency. Previously he served as procurator-general of Shanghai Municipal People's Procuratorate.

He is a delegate to 13th National People's Congress.

== Biography ==
Zhang was born in Linyi Prefecture (now Linyi City), Shandong, in May 1967. In 1986, he was accepted to Shandong University, majoring in Chinese language and literature. He joined the Chinese Communist Party (CCP) in October 1992.

After university in 1990, he was despatched to the Supreme People's Procuratorate as an official. But just six months later, he became an editor of Procuratorate Daily, the official organ of the Supreme People's Procuratorate, where he was deputy director of Literature and Art Department in March 1994 and dean and director of Editor-in-Chief Office in December 1995. In April 1999, he was appointed head of Publicity Division of the Political Department of the Supreme People's Procuratorate. He was chosen as editor-in-chief of Procuratorate Daily eight months later. In March 2005, he was appointed president and editor-in-chief of Procuratorate Daily, concurrently serving as director of Film and Television Center of the Supreme People's Procuratorate. He was director of Planning, Finance and Equipment Bureau of the Supreme People's Procuratorate in September 2011 and director of the General Office and director of the Information Office of the Supreme People's Procuratorate in January 2013. In January 2016, he rose to become procurator-general of Shanghai Municipal People's Procuratorate, a position at vice-ministerial level.

=== Downfall ===
On June 1, 2022, he was put under investigation for alleged "serious violations of discipline and laws" by the Central Commission for Discipline Inspection (CCDI), the party's internal disciplinary body, and the National Supervisory Commission, the highest anti-corruption agency of China. His predecessor Chen Xu was sacked for graft in March 2017. On November 4, he was arrested for suspected bribe taking by the Supreme People's Procuratorate.

Legal offices
Preceded by Chen Xu	Procurator-General of Shanghai Municipal People's Procuratorate; 2016–2022	Succeeded by Chen Yong
