= Yangling Agricultural Hi-tech Industries Demonstration Zone =

Coordinates: 34°16′20″N 108°05′05″E

- Simplified Chinese: 杨凌农业高新技术产业示范区
- Traditional Chinese: 楊淩農業高新技術產業示範區
Transcriptions
Standard Mandarin
- Hanyu Pinyin: Yánglíng Nóngyè Gāoxīn-jìshù Chǎnyè Shìfàn Qū

Yangling Agricultural Hi-tech Industries Demonstration Zone is a demonstration zone located in Yangling District, Xianyang, Shaanxi, People's Republic of China. It is under the direct governance of Shaanxi Province, and is the only such zone within all of the People's Republic of China. It was created on 29 July 1997.

The Northwest A&F University, a member of 985 project club, is in the zone.
