= Pu Bo =

Chinese politician

- 蒲波

Vice Governor of Guizhou
- In office January 2018 – May 2018
- Governor: Shen Yiqin

Communist Party Secretary of Deyang
- In office June 2015 – January 2018
- Preceded by: Li Xiangzhi
- Succeeded by: Zhao Shiyong

Mayor of Bazhong
- In office August 2008 – May 2010
- Preceded by: Lei Hongjin
- Succeeded by: Zhou Xi'an

Personal details
- Born: November 1963 (age 62) Nanchong, Sichuan, China
- Party: Chinese Communist Party (1990-2018, expelled)
- Education: Sichuan Agricultural University; Nanchong Normal College; Central Party School of the Chinese Communist Party

Pu Bo (Chinese: 蒲波; pinyin: Pǔ Bō; born November 1963) is a former Chinese politician who served as Vice Governor of Guizhou. He was dismissed from his position in May 2018 and placed under investigation by the Central Commission for Discipline Inspection and the National Supervisory Commission.

== Career ==
Pu Bo was born in November 1963, and he was entered to Sichuan Forestry School (四川省林业学校; now Sichuan Agricultural University) in 1978. After he graduated from Sichuan Forestry School, he became an officer of Forestry Research Institute and Agricultural Trading Office in Nanchong Prefecture. In September 1987, he was accepted to Nanchong Normal College, where he majored in Chinese. After college, he worked in the Agricultural Commission. Later, he worked in the governments of Guang'an Prefecture and Wusheng County.

In 1999, Pu was appointed as the Deputy Mayor of Guang'an, then he promoted to the Director of Publicity Department in 2003.

In 2006, Pu was moved to Liangshan Yi Autonomous Prefecture, and appointed as the Vice Governor, then he was appointed as the Deputy Party Secretary and Mayor of Bazhong in 2008.

In 2010, he was appointed as the deputy director of the Organization Department of the CCP Sichuan Committee. In 2015, he was appointed as the Party Secretary of Deyang. During his tenure, he invited Arnold Schwarzenegger to serve as Global Publicity Ambassador of the Sanxingdui culture.

On January 22, 2018, he was transferred to Guiyang, capital of Guizhou province, he was elevated to vice-governor of Guizhou, with responsibility for environmental protection, land and resources, housing and town and country construction, industry and commerce, and quality and technical supervision.

== Downfall ==
On May 4, 2018, four months after being named vice-governor, Pu Bo was placed under investigation by the Central Commission for Discipline Inspection, the party's internal disciplinary body, and the National Supervisory Commission, the highest anti-corruption agency of the People's Republic of China, for "serious violations of regulations and laws". He was expelled from the Communist Party on and removed from his post November 2. On November 28, he was arrested for suspected bribe taking.

On March 21, 2019, he stood trial at the Nanjing Intermediate Peoples Court on charges of taking bribes. Prosecutors accused Pu of taking advantage of his different positions in Sichuan between 1999 and 2017 to seek profits for various companies and individuals in corporate restructuring, construction project contracting, project development and personal promotions. In return, he received money and property worth over 71.26 million yuan ($10.6 million) either personally or through others. On July 18, Pu was sentenced to life in prison for taking bribes worth 71.26 million yuan ($10.6 million) by the Nanjing Intermediate People's Court.

Government offices
Preceded by Lei Hongjin (雷洪金)	Mayor of Bazhong; 2008–2010	Succeeded by Zhou Xi'an (周喜安)
Party political offices
Preceded by Li Xiangzhi (李向志)	Communist Party Secretary of Deyang; 2015–2018	Succeeded by Zhao Shiyong (赵世勇)
