= Wang Tie =

Chinese politician

- 王铁

Vice Chairman of Henan People's Congress
- In office January 2018 – August 2018
- Chairman: Xie Fuzhan

Vice Governor of Henan
- In office January 2012 – January 2018
- Governor: Guo Gengmao→Xie Fuzhan→Chen Run'er

Communist Party Secretary of Xinyang
- In office November 2006 – January 2012
- Preceded by: Liu Huailian
- Succeeded by: Guo Ruimin

Mayor of Xinyang
- In office February 2003 – December 2006
- Preceded by: Liu Huailian
- Succeeded by: Guo Ruimin

Communist Party Secretary of Jiyuan
- In office December 2001 – February 2003
- Preceded by: Tie Daisheng
- Succeeded by: Zhou Chunyan

Mayor of Jiyuan
- In office February 2000 – December 2001
- Preceded by: Geng Jianguo
- Succeeded by: Zhou Chunyan

Personal details
- Born: October 1957 (age 68–69) Biyang County, Henan, China
- Party: Chinese Communist Party (1986-2018; expelled)
- Education: Zhengzhou University; China University of Political Science and Law; Huazhong University of Science and Technology

Chinese name
- Traditional Chinese: 王鐵
- Simplified Chinese: 王铁
Transcriptions
Standard Mandarin
- Hanyu Pinyin: Wáng Tiě

Wang Tie (Chinese: 王铁; born October 1957) is a former Chinese politician who served as the Vice Director of Henan People's Congress. He was dismissed from his position in August 2018 and placed under investigation by the Central Commission for Discipline Inspection and the National Supervisory Commission.

== Career ==
Wang was born in October 1957, and he was graduated from Zhengzhou University, China University of Political Science and Law and Huazhong University of Science and Technology. He served as the teacher of Henan Business School, the officer of the Business Department of Henan, the deputy director of Henan Salt Administration, the manager of Henan Deputy Food Company, the deputy director of the Trade Department of Henan, the Chinese Communist Party Committee Secretary and mayor of Jiyuan.

In 2003, Wang was appointed as the mayor of Xinyang, and promoted to the post of the Chinese Communist Party Committee Secretary in 2006. He was appointed as the Vice Governor of Henan, then he was appointed as the Vice Director of Henan People's Congress in 2018.

== Downfall ==
On August 17, 2018, Wang Tie was placed under investigation by the Central Commission for Discipline Inspection, the Chinese Communist Party's internal disciplinary body, and the National Supervisory Commission, the highest anti-corruption agency of the People's Republic of China, for "serious violations of regulations and laws". According to the report, he turned himself in, gave back his illicit gains and showed sincere remorse. On November 19, 2018, Wang was expelled from the Chinese Communist Party and demoted to a "deputy department director level" (副处级) position. The Central Commission for Discipline Inspection said in a statement that Wang was found to have severely violated political discipline and political rules, conducted vote buying and canvassing in elections, refused to report personal matters to authorities, took advantage of his posts to assist relatives in business and illegally accepted gifts and money, and violated the life discipline.

On 16 June 2026, Wang was placed under investigation again by Henan Provincial Supervisory Commission for suspected of "serious violations of laws".

Government offices
Preceded by Geng Jianguo	Mayor of Jiyuan; 2000–2001	Succeeded by Zhou Chunyan
Preceded by Liu Huailian	Mayor of Xinyang; 2003–2006	Succeeded by Guo Ruimin
Party political offices
Preceded by Tie Daisheng	Communist Party Secretary of Jiyuan; 2001–2003	Succeeded by Zhou Chunyan
Preceded by Liu Huailian	Communist Party Secretary of Xinyang; 2006–2012	Succeeded by Guo Ruimin
