= Zhang Maocai =

Chinese politician

- 张茂才

Vice-Chairman of the Standing Committee of Shanxi Provincial People's Congress
- In office January 2013 – January 2018
- Chairman: Yuan Chunqing→Wang Rulin→Luo Huining

Vice-Chairman of the Shanxi Provincial Committee of the Chinese People's Political Consultative Conference
- In office January 2012 – January 2013
- Chairman: Xue Yanzhong

Communist Party Secretary of Jincheng
- In office February 2008 – January 2012
- Preceded by: Li Yanhong
- Succeeded by: Zhang Jiuping

Communist Party Secretary of Yuncheng
- In office February 2006 – February 2008
- Preceded by: Huang Youquan
- Succeeded by: Gao Weidong

Communist Party Secretary of Linfen
- In office February 2003 – February 2006
- Preceded by: Fan Jiheng
- Succeeded by: Wang Guozheng

Mayor of Linfen
- In office January 2001 – February 2003
- Preceded by: Fan Jiheng
- Succeeded by: Wang Guozheng

Personal details
- Born: September 1954 (age 72) Baode County, Shanxi, China
- Party: Chinese Communist Party (expelled; October 1974- June 2020)
- Education: Shanxi Normal University; Central Party School of the Chinese Communist Party

Chinese name
- Traditional Chinese: 張茂才
- Simplified Chinese: 张茂才
Transcriptions
Standard Mandarin
- Hanyu Pinyin: Zhāng Màocái

Zhang Maocai (Chinese: 张茂才; born September 1954) is a retired Chinese politician who spent most of his entire career in north China's Shanxi province. He was investigated by China's top anti-graft agency in March 2019. He has retired for more than a year. Previously he served as vice-chairman of the Standing Committee of Shanxi Provincial People's Congress. He was a delegate to the 17th National Congress of the Chinese Communist Party.

== Career ==
Zhang was born in Baode County, Shanxi, in September 1954. During the late Cultural Revolution, he was an official in his home-county. In September 1974, he entered Shanxi Normal University, where he majored in politics. After graduating in September 1977, he was dispatched to the government of Xinzhou. In August 1985, he was transferred to the government of Shanxi and where he was deputy director of Shanxi Press and Publication Bureau from June 1992 to February 1999. He served as deputy party chief of Linfen in February 2000, and three years later promoted to the party chief position. He was party chief of Yuncheng in February 2006, and held that office until February 2008. He became the party chief of Jincheng in February 2008, and served until January 2012. In January 2012 he was promoted to become vice-chairman of the Shanxi Provincial Committee of the Chinese People's Political Consultative Conference (CPPCC), a position he held for only one year, then he was appointed vice-chairman of the Standing Committee of Shanxi Provincial People's Congress. He retired in January 2018.

== Investigation ==
On March 2, 2019, he has been placed under investigation for "serious violations of laws and regulations", said one-sentence statement issued by the Central Commission for Discipline Inspection (CCDI), the party's internal disciplinary body, and the National Supervisory Commission, the highest anti-corruption agency of China. He was expelled from the Chinese Communist Party and was abolished retirement benefits on 20 June. He was detained on 12 July. On October 17, his trial was held at the Intermediate People's Court of Zibo. The public prosecutors accused him of abusing his multiple positions between 2002 and 2018 in Shanxi to seek benefits for certain organizations and individuals in business operation, project contracting and job promotions. In return, he received 72.44 million yuan (about 10.23 million U.S. dollars) worth of money and valuables either by himself or through his family members.

On June 24, 2020, Zibo Intermediate People's Court held a court session to try his case, the court confiscated six million yuan of his personal assets and ordered him to hand in money gained from bribes. He was sentenced to 15 years for taking advantages of his posts to benefit others in personnel promotion and arrangement and receiving a huge amount of money and gifts in return.

Government offices
| Preceded by Fan Jiheng (樊纪亨) | Mayor of Linfen; 2001–2003 | Succeeded by Wang Guozheng (王国正) |
Party political offices
| Preceded by Fan Jiheng (樊纪亨) | Communist Party Secretary of Linfen; 2003–2006 | Succeeded by Wang Guozheng (王国正) |
| Preceded by Huang Youquan (黄有泉) | Communist Party Secretary of Yuncheng; 2006–2008 | Succeeded by Gao Weidong (高卫东) |
| Preceded by Li Yanhong (李雁红) | Communist Party Secretary of Jincheng; 2008–2012 | Succeeded by Zhang Jiuping (张九萍) |
