= Ji Xiangqi =

Chinese politician (born 1960)

- 季缃绮

Vice Governor of Shandong
- In office January 2013 – January 2018
- Governor: Guo Shuqing→Gong Zheng

Personal details
- Born: October 1960 (age 65–66) Fei County, Shandong
- Party: Chinese Communist Party (expelled)
- Education: Qingdao Vocational and Technical College of Hotel Management; Nankai University

Chinese name
- Traditional Chinese: 季緗綺
- Simplified Chinese: 季缃绮
Transcriptions
Standard Mandarin
- Hanyu Pinyin: Jì Xiāngqĭ

Ji Xiangqi (Chinese: 季缃绮; pinyin: Jì Xiāngqǐ; born October 1960) is a former Chinese politician and business executive. He was the Vice Governor of Shandong and the President of Shandong Commercial Group (d.b.a. Lushang Group). On January 4, 2018, Ji Xiangqi was placed under investigation by the Central Commission for Discipline Inspection.

== Early life and education ==
Ji Xiangqi was born in October 1960. He graduated from Qingdao Vocational and Technical College of Hotel Management, and obtained the Executive Master of Business Administration (EMBA) degree of Nankai University.

== Career ==
In 1992, he was appointed as deputy manager of Shandong World Trade Center, and later promoted to Manager. He was named as President of Shandong Commercial Group (d.b.a. Lushang Group) from 2002 to 2010.

In 2013, Ji was appointed as the Vice Governor of Shandong.

=== Investigation ===
On January 4, 2018, Ji Xiangqi was placed under investigation by the Central Commission for Discipline Inspection, the Chinese Communist Party's internal disciplinary body, for "serious violations of regulations". He was expelled from the CCP on February 13.

On November 1, 2018, Ji Xiangqi stood trial for taking bribes and embezzlement at the Intermediate People's Court of Jinzhong in Shanxi. Ji Xiangqi took advantage of his position to benefit organizations on matters related to business cooperation and project contracting between 2003 and 2017, when he successively held different posts. He was charged with accepting money and property worth more than 25.71 million yuan (about 3.7 million U.S. dollars). He later pleaded guilty. On March 19, 2019, Ji was sentenced to 14 years for taking bribes and embezzlement and fined 3 million yuan.

Business positions
Preceded by Liu Hengshan	General Manager of Shandong Commercial Group Co., Ltd. 2002–2005	Succeeded by Wang Renquan
Preceded by Liu Hengshan	Chairman of Shandong Commercial Group Co., Ltd. 2002–2013	Succeeded by Wang Renquan
