= Hao Chunrong =

Chinese politician

- 郝春荣

Vice Governor of Liaoning
- In office January 2018 – March 2022
- Governor: Tang Yijun; Liu Ning; Li Lecheng

Mayor of Panjin
- In office October 2016 – January 2018
- Preceded by: Gao Ke
- Succeeded by: Tang Fangdong

Personal details
- Born: April 1963 (age 63) Yantai, Shandong, China
- Party: Chinese Communist Party (1985–2022; expelled)
- Education: Liaoyang Health School; Central Party School of the Chinese Communist Party

Hao Chunrong (Chinese: 郝春荣; pinyin: Hǎo Chūnróng; born April 1963) is a former Chinese politician who spent her entire career in northeast China's Liaoning province. Previously she served as vice governor of Liaoning. She is a delegate to the 13th National People's Congress. In March 2022, she was investigated by China's top anti-corruption agency.

In May 2023, Hao was sentenced to 12 years in prison for taking nearly 19 million yuan in bribes and abuse of power.

== Early life and education ==
Hao was born in Yantai, Shandong, in April 1963. In 1980, she entered Liaoyang Health School, and worked there after graduation.

== Career ==
Hao joined the Chinese Communist Party (CCP) in January 1985. In September 1985, she became deputy secretary of Liaoyang Health Bureau Committee of the Communist Youth League of China, rising to secretary in April 1989. She served as deputy secretary of Liaoyang Committee of the Communist Youth League of China in February 1990, and nine months later promoted to the secretary position. In February 1996, she became vice governor of Taizihe District, rising to become governor in December 1999. In November 2000, she was admitted to member of the standing committee of the CCP Liaoyang Municipal Committee, the city's top authority. She concurrently served as vice mayor since January 2003. He was deputy party secretary of Chaoyang in April 2012, and held that office until March 2014, when she was appointed director of Liaoning Provincial Tourism Administration. In September 2016, she was promoted to acting mayor of Panjin, confirmed in October. In January 2018, she was elevated to vice governor of Liaoning, a position at vice-ministerial level.

== Corruption ==
On 30 March 2022, she was put under investigation for alleged "serious violations of discipline and laws" by the Central Commission for Discipline Inspection (CCDI), the party's internal disciplinary body, and the National Supervisory Commission, the highest anti-corruption agency of China. She was expelled from the party for corruption and bribery. She has been referred to the Procuratorate for criminal investigation and prosecution. Her colleague Wang Dawei was sacked for corruption on March 1. On September 1, she was expelled from the CCP and removed from public office.

=== Sentence ===
On May 30, 2023, the Intermediate People's Court of Dalian, Liaoning sentenced Hao to 12 years in prison for bribery. Moreover, Hao was fined 2 million yuan ($282,646). Hao's embezzled funds and assets were confiscated and turned over to the state treasury.

Hao had taken illegal bribes worth 18.83 million yuan ($2.66 million) in property. From 1999 to 2021, she abused her power in land allocation, project contracts, undue favoritism to companies and individuals, and job promotions and adjustments.

Given that Hao admitted her crimes, disclosed unknown details to help investigators, pleaded guilty, fully returned her illegally gained assets, the court showed leniency and gave Hao a lighter punishment than what she could have received.

Government offices
Preceded by Gao Ke	Mayor of Panjin; 2016–2018	Succeeded by Tang Fangdong
