= Bai Xiangqun =

Chinese politician

- 白向群

Vice Chairman of the Inner Mongolia Autonomous Region People's Government
- In office May 2012 – May 2018
- Chairwoman: Bu Xiaolin

Communist Party Secretary of Xilingol League
- In office February 2011 – May 2012
- Preceded by: Rong Tianhou
- Succeeded by: Yu Yongquan

Communist Party Secretary of Wuhai
- In office February 2008 – February 2011
- Preceded by: Zhao Zhong
- Succeeded by: Bao Changqing

Mayor of Wuhai
- In office March 2003 – February 2008
- Preceded by: Zhao Zhong
- Succeeded by: Hou Fengqi

Personal details
- Born: September 1962 (age 63–64) Beipiao, Liaoning, China
- Party: Chinese Communist Party (expelled; 1984-2018)
- Education: Inner Mongolia University for Nationalities; Chinese Academy of Social Sciences; Renmin University of China

Bai Xiangqun (Chinese: 白向群; pinyin: Baí Xiàngqún; born September 1962) is a former Chinese politician who spent his entire career in north China's Inner Mongolia Autonomous Region. As of April 2018 he was under investigation by the Communist Party's anti-corruption agency and the National Supervisory Commission. Previously he served as vice-chairman of the Inner Mongolia Autonomous Region People's Government. Bai was the second high-ranking official probed since the National Supervisory Commission was established in March 2018, behind Wang Xiaoguang, former vice-governor of Guizhou.

Born in Beipiao, Liaoning in 1962, Bai graduated from the Inner Mongolia University for Nationalities. He joined the Chinese Communist Party in January 1984, when he was about to graduate. After university he entered the workforce in Chifeng, Inner Mongolia, and then Wuhai, where he was mayor for 5 years and party chief for 3 years. He rose to become party chief of Xilingol League in 2011, but having held the position for only one year, and soon he was promoted again to become vice-chairman of the Inner Mongolia Autonomous Region People's Government. Before he stepped down, his subordinates Hou Fengqi, Bo Liangen (薄连根), He Yonglin (何永林) and Wu Wenyuan (武文元) were sacked in Communist Party General Secretary Xi Jinping's continues a campaign against corruption at all levels of government.

== Education ==
Bai was born in Beipiao, Liaoning in September 1962. He is of Mongol ethnicity. In September 1980, he entered the Inner Mongolia Nationality Normal College (now Inner Mongolia University for Nationalities), majoring in physics, where he graduated in July 1984. He was a part-time student of the Chinese Academy of Social Sciences and the Renmin University of China.

== Career ==
After graduation, he was assigned to the Education Bureau of Chifeng Municipal Government as an official. He served as deputy secretary of Youth League Committee of Chifeng in February 1993, and two years later promoted to the secretary position. In August 1996 he was promoted to become deputy secretary of Youth League Committee of Inner Mongolia Autonomous Region, rising to secretary in September 2000. In March 2003, he was transferred to Wuhai, serving as mayor and deputy party chief, and then party chief, the top political position in the city, beginning in February 2008. In February 2011, he was appointed party chief of Xilingol League, a position he held until May 2012, when he was promoted again to become vice-chairman of the Inner Mongolia Autonomous Region People's Government.

== Investigation ==
On April 25, 2018, the Central Commission for Discipline Inspection and National Supervisory Commission said in a statement on their website that Bai Xiangqun was put under investigation for alleged "serious violations of discipline and laws." He is expelled from the Communist Party on October 19, 2018. On October 30, 2018, the National Supervisory Commission finished an investigation of Bai's case and handed it to the procuratorial organ for review and prosecution.

On January 31, 2019, Bai Xiangqun stood trial for bribery, embezzlement, insider trading and leaking insider information at the Intermediate People's Court of Dalian in northeast China's Liaoning province. He was charged of taking advantage of his various positions in the region between 1998 and 2018 to help departments and individuals in coal resource allocation, real estate projects, construction contracting and personnel promotions and received and property worth more than 85.2 million yuan ($13.18 million) in return. He used his position as party chief of Wuhai and Xilin Gol League between 2008 and 2012 to illegally transfer public properties valued at more than 7.1 million yuan ($1.1 million) to himself on five occasions. He illegally acquired insider information and ordered others to buy stocks, earning more than 17.17 million yuan ($2.65 million) in profits between 2010 and 2015. He also leaked the insider information to others, who used his information for stocks trading, illegally gaining a profit of 40.52 million yuan ($6.27 million). On October 24, 2019, he was jailed for 16 years for taking bribes, corruption, insider trading and leaking insider information by the Intermediate People's Court of Dalian. He pleaded guilty in court and said he would not appeal to a higher court.

Civic offices
Preceded by Wu Lan	Secretary of the Inner Mongolia Autonomous Region Committee of the Communist Youth League of China; 2000–2003	Succeeded by Luo Zhihu
Government offices
Preceded by Zhao Zhong	Mayor of Wuhai; 2003–2008	Succeeded by Hou Fengqi
Party political offices
Preceded by Zhao Zhong	Communist Party Secretary of Wuhai; 2008–2011	Succeeded by Bao Changqing
Preceded by Rong Tianhou	Communist Party Secretary of Xilingol League; 2011–2012	Succeeded by Yu Yongquan
