= Wu Zhen (politician) =

Chinese politician

- 吴浈

Deputy Commissioner of the National Health and Family Planning Commission
- In office August 2015 – March 2018
- Commissioner: Li Bin

Deputy Director of the China Food and Drug Administration
- In office July 2013 – March 2018
- Director: Zhang Yong

Personal details
- Born: May 1958 (age 68) Nanfeng County, Jiangxi, China
- Party: Chinese Communist Party (expelled)
- Education: Jiangxi University of Traditional Chinese Medicine

Chinese name
- Traditional Chinese: 吳湞
- Simplified Chinese: 吴浈
Transcriptions
Standard Mandarin
- Hanyu Pinyin: Wú Zhēn

Wu Zhen (Chinese: 吴浈; born May 1958) is a former Chinese politician who served as the Deputy Commissioner of the National Health and Family Planning Commission and the deputy director of the China Food and Drug Administration. He was dismissed from his position in August 2018 and placed under investigation by the Central Commission for Discipline Inspection and the National Supervisory Commission.

== Career ==
Wu was born in May 1958, and he was graduated from Jiangxi University of Traditional Chinese Medicine in 1983. He served as the officer of the Medical Education Science and Technology Department of the Health Department of Jiangxi, the director of the Drug Administration of the Health Department of Jiangxi, and the director of the Jiangxi Food and Drug Administration.

In 2006, Wu was appointed as the deputy director of the State Food and Drug Administration, who was responsible for drug registration, supervision and review. He was appointed as the Director of Food and Drug Safety of the China Food and Drug Administration in April 2013, then he appointed as the deputy director in July. Wu also served as the Deputy Commissioner of the National Health and Family Planning Commission since 2015, and he retired in March 2018.

Wu was dubbed a "vaccine tsar", which he was responsible for vaccine supervision for long time.

== Investigation ==
On August 16, 2018, Wu Zhen was placed under investigation by the Central Commission for Discipline Inspection, the Chinese Communist Party (CCP)'s internal disciplinary body, and the National Supervisory Commission, the highest anti-corruption agency of the People's Republic of China. According to the report, this announcement was decided by the meeting of the Politburo Standing Committee of the Chinese Communist Party.

Wu was expelled from the CCP on February 2, 2019. On February 26, he was arrested for suspected bribe taking and abuse of power. On April 1, he was indicted. On May 30, he stood trial at the Chengdu Intermediate People's Court on charges of taking bribes and abuse of power. Prosecutors accused Wu of taking advantage of his different positions between 1996 and 2018 to provide assistance to relevant organizations and individuals in getting approval for drugs or finding employment. In return, he illegally received money and goods worth more than 21.71 million yuan (about 3.14 million U.S. dollars) directly or through his relatives. He was also charged with fraud in his work for personal purposes and abusing his power when he was deputy director of the China Food and Drug Administration and National Health and Family Planning Commission, causing "huge losses" to the interests of the country and the people.

On November 15, 2019, Wu was sentenced to 16 years in prison for taking bribes of 21.71 million yuan and abuse of power by Chengdu Intermediate People's Court.
