= Wang Erzhi =

Chinese politician

- 王尔智

Vice Chairman of the Jilin Provincial Committee of the Chinese People's Political Consultative Conference
- In office February 2012 – January 2018
- Chairman: Bayanqolu→Huang Yanming

Personal details
- Born: August 1954 (age 72) Yitong Manchu Autonomous County, Jilin, China
- Party: Chinese Communist Party (expelled)
- Education

Chinese name
- Traditional Chinese: 王爾智
- Simplified Chinese: 王尔智
Transcriptions
Standard Mandarin
- Hanyu Pinyin: Wáng Ěrzhì

Wang Erzhi (Chinese: 王尔智; born August 1954) is a Chinese politician who spent most of his career in northeast China's Jilin province. As of August 2018 he was under investigation by the Chinese Communist Party Central Commission for Discipline Inspection and the National Supervisory Commission. Previously he served as vice chairman of the Jilin Provincial Committee of the Chinese People's Political Consultative Conference (CPPCC).

== Career ==
Wang was born in Yitong Manchu Autonomous County, Jilin, in August 1954.

He was secretary general of the Jilin Provincial Committee of the Chinese People's Political Consultative Conference (CPPCC) in January 2008, and held that office until February 2012. In February 2012 he was promoted to become the vice chairman of that government institution, a position he held until his retirement in January 2018.

== Downfall ==
On August 25, 2018, he was placed under investigation by the Central Commission for Discipline Inspection (CCDI), the party's internal disciplinary body, and the National Supervisory Commission, the highest anti-corruption agency of China.

He was expelled from the Party and dismissed from public office on January 19, 2019. On January 29, he was arrested for suspected bribe taking. On March 17, he has been indicted on suspicion of accepting bribes. On May 16, he pleaded guilty to bribery during his first trial at Harbin Intermediate People's Court in Heilongjiang province. Prosecutors accused him of taking advantage of his different positions in Jilin between 2001 and 2018 to offer preferential treatment to people and departments in project construction, land leasing, and the refund of urban infrastructure supporting fees, and then accepted bribes of more than 50.72 million yuan ($7.86 million) in return.

On August 9, 2019, Wang was sentenced on 14 years in prison and fined 4 million yuan. Wang was charged with accepting bribes worth 50.72 million yuan, by the Intermediate People's Court of Harbin.
