= Wang Lixia =

Chinese politician

Wang Lixia 王莉霞 ᠸᠠᠩ ᠯᠢ ᠰᠢᠶᠠ
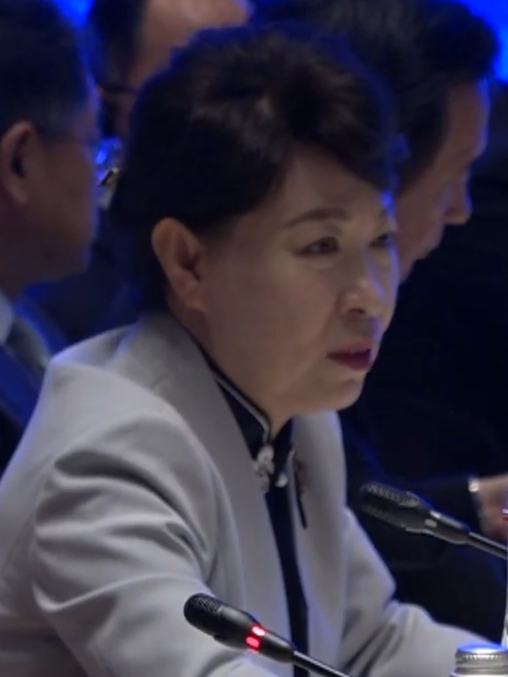
- Wang in Beijing, October 2023

Chairwoman of Inner Mongolia
- In office August 5, 2021 – September 4, 2025
- Party Secretary: Shi Taifeng; Sun Shaocheng
- Preceded by: Bu Xiaolin
- Succeeded by: Bao Gang

Party Secretary of Hohhot
- In office August 31, 2019 – August 2, 2021
- Deputy: Zhang Baicheng; He Haidong (mayor)
- Preceded by: Yun Guangzhong
- Succeeded by: Bao Gang

Vice Governor of Shaanxi
- In office January 31, 2013 – November 24, 2016
- Governor: Lou Qinjian; Hu Heping

Mayor of Tongchuan
- In office January 25, 2011 – February 4, 2013
- Party Secretary: Feng Xinzhu
- Preceded by: Feng Xinzhu
- Succeeded by: Guo Dawei

Director of the Shaanxi Provincial Bureau of Statistics
- In office December 31, 2005 – February 28, 2011
- Governor: Chen Deming; Yuan Chunqing; Zhao Zhengyong
- Preceded by: Hu Shouxian
- Succeeded by: Ding Yunxiang

Personal details
- Born: June 1964 (age 62) Jianping County, Liaoning Province, China
- Party: Chinese Communist Party (1992-2026, expelled)
- Spouse: Wang Zhenlong
- Children: 1
- Education: Liaoning University; Shaanxi Institute of Finance and Economics; Xiamen University

Wang Lixia (Chinese: 王莉霞; pinyin: Wáng Lìxiá; Mongolian: ᠸᠠᠩ
ᠯᠢ
ᠰᠢᠶᠠ; born June 1964) is a Chinese politician of Mongol ethnicity born in Jianping County, Liaoning Province. Joining the Chinese Communist Party (CCP) in 1992, she graduated from Liaoning University with a degree in Economics and Statistics, earned a master's degree in economics from the Shaanxi Institute of Finance and Economics (now the School of Economics and Finance, Xi'an Jiaotong University), and obtained a Ph.D. in Economics from Xiamen University.

She came from academic field and later went through a series of political offices, including Director of the Shaanxi Provincial Bureau of Statistics, Mayor of Tongchuan, Vice Governor of Shaanxi Province, Standing Committee Member of the CCP Inner Mongolia Committee, Head of its United Front Work Department, and CCP Committee Secretary of Hohhot. She later served as Deputy Party Secretary of Inner Mongolia and Chairwoman of the People's Government of Inner Mongolia Autonomous Region. Wang was also a member of the 20th Central Committee of the Chinese Communist Party.

In August 2025, the Central Commission for Discipline Inspection (CCDI) and the National Supervisory Commission announced that she was under investigation for alleged serious violations of discipline and law, which marked her political downfall. She was expelled from the CCP in February 2026, a decision confirmed by the CCP Central Committee in October 2026.

== Biography ==
=== Early Years and Shaanxi Province ===
Wang Lixia was born in Jianping, Liaoning Province. She graduated from the Department of Economics at Liaoning University in 1985, majoring in Planning and Statistics, and began her professional career. She later entered the Department of Statistics at the Shaanxi Institute of Finance and Economics (now the School of Economics and Finance, Xi'an Jiaotong University) to pursue a master's degree. After graduating in July 1988, she joined the Xi'an Institute of Statistics as a lecturer. She became a member of the Chinese Communist Party in December 1992. At the university, she served successively as a lecturer and associate professor in the Department of Economic Statistics. During this period, from September 1997 to July 2000, she studied at the School of Economics of Xiamen University and earned a Ph.D. in Economics.

Wang began her political career in July 2000, when she was appointed Deputy Director of the Shaanxi Provincial Bureau of Statistics. In December of the same year, she was awarded the title of Professor. She took the office as Director of the Bureau at the end of 2005.

At the beginning of 2011, Wang went to Tongchuan, a city located north of Xi'an in Shaanxi Province, to serve as its acting mayor. In February, she left her position in the Provincial Statistics Bureau, and in April she formally engaged in the position of Tongchuan's mayor.

In January 2013, Wang was elected Vice Governor of Shaanxi Province, overseeing commerce and trade, health and family planning, foreign affairs, and Taiwan-related affairs.

=== Inner Mongolia Autonomous Region ===
Wang was transferred to Inner Mongolia in October 2016. There, she entered the regional leadership as a standing member of the Party Committee and was also appointed Head of the United Front Work Department. A year later, in October 2017, she rose onto the national political stage when she was elected as an alternate member of the 19th Central Committee of the Chinese Communist Party at the CCP's 19th National Congress. Her responsibilities in Inner Mongolia deepened in August 2019, when she became CCP Committee Secretary of Hohhot, the capital city of the region.

Two years later, in August 2021, she was elevated again — this time to Deputy Party Secretary of the autonomous region, while simultaneously assuming the role of acting Chairwoman of the Inner Mongolia Regional Government. She officially got into the position the following month, being the third woman who owns this job.

By October 2022, she was elected as a full member of the 20th Central Committee of the Chinese Communist Party. The following year, in February 2023, she was elected as a delegate to the 14th National People's Congress, representing Inner Mongolia.

== Downfall ==
On August 22, 2025, the Central Commission for Discipline Inspection of CCP and the National Supervisory Commission announced that Wang Lixia was under investigation for serious violations of discipline and law. She became the third sitting provincial-level administrative chief in China to fall from power that year, after Jin Xiangjun, Governor of Shanxi Province, and Lan Tianli, Chairman of the Guangxi Zhuang Autonomous Region. In September, she stepped down as Chairwoman of the People's Government of Inner Mongolia Autonomous Region, and her position as a delegate to the regional People's Congress was also revoked. Wang was expelled from the party and dismissed from the posts on February 12, 2026. On October 29, 2026, the fifth plenary session of the 20th CCP Central Committee reviewed and approved the report of the CCDI on the "serious violations of discipline and law" by Wang and confirmed the Politburo decision to expel her from the CCP.

Government offices
Preceded by Bu Xiaolin	Chairwoman of the Inner Mongolia; 2021–2025	Succeeded by Bao Gang
Preceded by Feng Xinzhu	Mayor of Tongchuan; 2011–2013	Succeeded by Guo Dawei
Party political offices
Preceded by Yun Guangzhong	Party Secretary of Hohhot; 2019–2021	Succeeded by Bao Gang
Preceded by Bu Xiaolin	Head of the CCP Inner Mongolia United Front Department; 2016–2019	Succeeded by Duan Zhiqiang
