= Peng Yuxing =

Chinese chemist and politician

- 彭宇行

Vice Governor of Sichuan
- In office September 2017 – April 2019
- Governor: Yin Li

Communist Party Secretary of Mianyang
- In office June 2015 – December 2017
- Preceded by: Luo Qiang
- Succeeded by: Liu Chao

Communist Party Secretary of Neijiang
- In office November 2013 – June 2015
- Preceded by: Zeng Wanming
- Succeeded by: Yang Songbai

Personal details
- Born: November 1962 (age 63) Qianwei County, Sichuan, China
- Party: Chinese Communist Party (expelled)
- Education: Sichuan University; Pierre and Marie Curie University

Chinese name
- Chinese: 彭宇行
Transcriptions
Standard Mandarin
- Hanyu Pinyin: Péng Yǔxíng
- Wade–Giles: Pʻêng^{2} Yü^{3}-hsing^{2}
- IPA: [pʰə̌ŋ ỳ.ɕǐŋ]

Peng Yuxing (Chinese: 彭宇行; born November 1962) is a Chinese chemist and former politician. He served as President of the Chengdu Institute of Organic Chemistry and Vice President of the Chengdu branch of the Chinese Academy of Sciences. After entering politics, he served as Party Secretary of the cities Neijiang and Mianyang, and became Vice Governor of Sichuan province in 2017. In April 2019, he came under investigation by China's anti-graft agencies and was stripped of his government posts. He was expelled from the Chinese Communist Party in October 2019.

== Early life and education ==
Peng was born in Qianwei County, Sichuan, in November 1962. He entered Sichuan University in September 1978 and graduated four years later with a bachelor's degree in chemistry. He earned his master's degree in polymer chemistry from the same university in 1985.

In July 1985, he was assigned to the Chengdu Institute of Organic Chemistry, Chinese Academy of Sciences, as an assistant research fellow. In 1990, he went to France to study at Pierre and Marie Curie University in Paris, and earned his PhD in polymer materials two years later. He subsequently spent more than a year conducting postdoctoral research at Exxon in France.

== Career ==
In December 1993, Peng returned to the Chengdu Institute of Organic Chemistry as a research professor. He became vice president of the institute in February 1997, and President in June 1999. He joined the Chinese Communist Party in June 1995. In April 2001, he was appointed Vice President of the Chengdu branch of the Chinese Academy of Sciences.

In December 2009, Peng became party branch secretary of Sichuan Provincial Science and Technology Department, and concurrently served as its head in January 2010. In November 2013 he was appointed Party Secretary of Neijiang City.

In June 2015, Peng was appointed Party Secretary of Mianyang, a city that serves as an important research and production base for the defence industry. He was also the chief of the party's working committee for the Mianyang Sciences and Technology City project, responsible for working with researchers to convert military technology into civilian products. In September 2017, he was promoted to Vice Governor of Sichuan and headed the provincial commission for integrated military and civilian development, and was described as a "czar" of China's military-industrial complex. He was also elected a delegate to the 19th National Congress of the Chinese Communist Party.

== Investigation ==
On 28 April 2019, Peng was put under investigation for alleged "serious violations of discipline and laws" by the Central Commission for Discipline Inspection (CCDI), the party's internal disciplinary body, and the National Supervisory Commission, the highest anti-corruption agency of China. According to The Nikkei, citing overseas Chinese media, Peng was suspected of leaking information on military technology to foreign intelligence agencies. He was formally stripped of his government posts on 12 May 2019.

On 10 October, the CCDI announced its investigation results. It found that Peng had accepted bribes, misspent public funds on excessive travel and dining expenses, and traded power for sex and money unscrupulously. He was expelled from the Communist Party and demoted by several official ranks. According to the announcement, he was given reduced punishment because he confessed to his wrongdoings and returned his illegal gains. He was downgraded to 4th-class investigator (4级调研员). His qualification for delegates to the 11th CPC Sichuan Provincial Congress and the 19th National Congress of the Chinese Communist Party were terminated.

Party political offices
Preceded by Zeng Wanming (曾万明)	Communist Party Secretary of Neijiang; 2013–2015	Succeeded by Yang Songbai (杨松柏)
Preceded by Luo Qiang (罗强)	Communist Party Secretary of Mianyang; 2015–2017	Succeeded by Liu Chao (刘超)
