= Economic Information Daily =

- Native name: 经济参考报
- Format: Broadsheet
- Owner: Xinhua News Agency
- Founded: 1 July 1981
- Language: Chinese
- Headquarters: Beijing, China
- Website: jjckb.xinhuanet.com

The Economic Information Daily (simplified Chinese: 经济参考报; traditional Chinese: 經濟參考報; pinyin: Jīngjì Cānkǎo Bào), also translated into English as Economic Reference Paper or Economic Reference Daily, is a Chinese state-run newspaper specializing in economics, based in Beijing.

Economic Information Daily is sponsored and supervised by Xinhua News Agency, and is directly contacted and directed by the Central Policy Research Office of China.

Inaugurated in Beijing on 1 July 1981, Economic Information Daily is the first national economic professional newspaper born during China's Reform and opening up. On 7 December 1990, Deng Xiaoping wrote the name of the Economic Information Daily in his own handwriting.

On July 17, 2013, Wang Wenzhi (王文志), the principal reporter of the Economic Information Daily, reported in his Sina Weibo that the chairman of China Resources Group, Song Lin, was suspected of huge corruption. Wang accused Song Lin of intentionally overpaying for a coal-industry acquisition, resulting in the loss of billions of state property.
