= Chen Xu (prosecutor) =

Chinese prosecutor (born 1952)

- 陈旭

Prosecutor General of Shanghai People's Procuratorate
- In office February 2008 – January 2016
- Succeeded by: Zhang Bencai

Personal details
- Born: November 1952 (age 73) Shanghai, China
- Party: Chinese Communist Party (1974–2017; expelled)

Chen Xu (simplified Chinese: 陈旭; traditional Chinese: 陳旭; pinyin: Chén Xù; born November 1952) is a former Chinese prosecutor who served as the Prosecutor General of Shanghai People's Procuratorate from 2008 to 2016. He was investigated in March 2017 by the Communist Party's anti-graft agency, suspected of corruption.

== Career ==
Chen was born in Shanghai in November 1952. In 1979, he became the Clerk of Shanghai Intermediate People's Court, then promoted to vice president. He became the Vice President of Shanghai Supreme People's Court in 1995, then became the President of Shanghai 1st Intermediate People's Court in 1998. In 2002, Chen became the Deputy Secretary of the Political and Legal Affairs Commission of Shanghai, and the Prosecutor General of Shanghai People's Procuratorate in 2008.

In 2016, he is no longer served as the Prosecutor General of Shanghai People's Procuratorate for retirement, and he became the President of Shanghai Law Society.

== Downfall ==
On March 1, 2017, Chen Xu was suspected of "serious violations of party discipline", and placed under investigation by the Central Commission for Discipline Inspection (CCDI). Chen was expelled from the Communist Party on May 25, 2017.

On October 25, 2018, Chen was sentenced to life in prison for taking bribes worth 74.23 million yuan in Nanning.

In June 2022, his successor Zhang Bencai was also put under investigation for alleged "serious violations of discipline and laws".

Legal offices
Preceded by ?	Procurator-General of Shanghai Municipal People's Procuratorate; 2008–2016	Succeeded by Zhang Bencai
