= Jin Suidong =

Chinese politician

- 靳绥东

Vice-Chairman of the Henan Provincial Committee of the Chinese People's Political Consultative Conference
- In office January 2008 – January 2018
- Chairman: Liu Wei
- Succeeded by: Zhang Guangzhi

Communist Party Secretary of Anyang
- In office January 2004 – January 2008
- Preceded by: Fang Xiaoyu
- Succeeded by: Zhang Guangzhi

Mayor of Anyang
- In office January 2001 – January 2004
- Preceded by: Fang Xiaoyu
- Succeeded by: Dong Yong'an

Personal details
- Born: January 1954 (age 72) Qufu, Shandong, China
- Party: Chinese Communist Party (expelled)
- Education: Henan University
- Occupation: Politician, calligrapher

Chinese name
- Traditional Chinese: 靳綏東
- Simplified Chinese: 靳绥东
Transcriptions
Standard Mandarin
- Hanyu Pinyin: Jìn Suídōng

Jin Suidong (Chinese: 靳绥东; born January 1954) is a former Chinese politician who spent most of his entire career in north China's Henan province. On September 18, 2018, he has been placed under investigation as Chinese Communist Party general secretary Xi Jinping's continues an anti-graft dragnet at all levels of government, military and ruling Communist Party.

Jin is also a calligrapher, especially the semi-cursive script and oracle bone script. He is a member of the Chinese Calligraphers Association.

He was a member of the 17th National Congress of the Chinese Communist Party and a delegate to the 10th National People's Congress.

== Education ==
Jin was born in Qufu, Shandong in January 1954. He entered the workforce in May 1972 and joined the Chinese Communist Party in June 1982. After resuming the college entrance examination in 1978, he entered Henan University, majoring in political and legal science.

== Career ==
After university in 1982, he was assigned to the Henan Provincial Government as a civil servant. He served as Deputy Communist Party Secretary and magistrate of Changge County from 1990 to 1992, and Communist Party Secretary, the top political position in the county, from 1992 to 1995. In May 1995 he was transferred to Anyang, where he served as secretary-general, and held that office until December 1998. He became Mayor of Anyang in January 2001, and then Communist Party Secretary, the top political position in the city, beginning in January 2004.

In January 2008 he was promoted to become vice-chairman of the Henan Provincial Committee of the Chinese People's Political Consultative Conference (CPPCC), a position he held until January 2017.

== Downfall ==
On September 18, 2018, he has been placed under investigation for serious violations of laws and regulations by the Central Commission for Discipline Inspection (CCDI), the party's internal disciplinary body, and the National Supervisory Commission, the highest anti-corruption agency of China.

In February 2019, he was expelled from the Chinese Communist Party for multiple violations. On February 6, he was arrested. On May 23, he stood trial at the Intermediate People's Court of Jinan on charges of taking bribes. He was accused of abusing his powers in former positions he held between 1999 and 2018 in Henan to benefit organizations and individuals on matters related to real estate projects and arranging jobs. In return, he accepted money and valuables worth over 44.34 million yuan (about 6.42 million U.S. dollars). On September 26, Jin was sentenced on 15 years in prison and fined 4 million yuan. Jin was charged with accepting bribes worth 44.34 million yuan (about 6.27 million U.S. dollars), by the Intermediate People's Court of Jinan.

Government offices
Preceded by Fang Xiaoyu (方晓宇)	Mayor of Anyang; 2001–2004	Succeeded by Dong Yong'an (董永安)
Party political offices
Preceded by Fang Xiaoyu (方晓宇)	Communist Party Secretary of Anyang; 2004–2008	Succeeded by Zhang Guangzhi (张广智)
Assembly seats
Preceded by ?	Vice-Chairman of the Henan Provincial Committee of the Chinese People's Political Consultative Conference; 2008–2017	Succeeded by Zhang Guangzhi (张广智)
