= Red Globe =

Variety of table grape

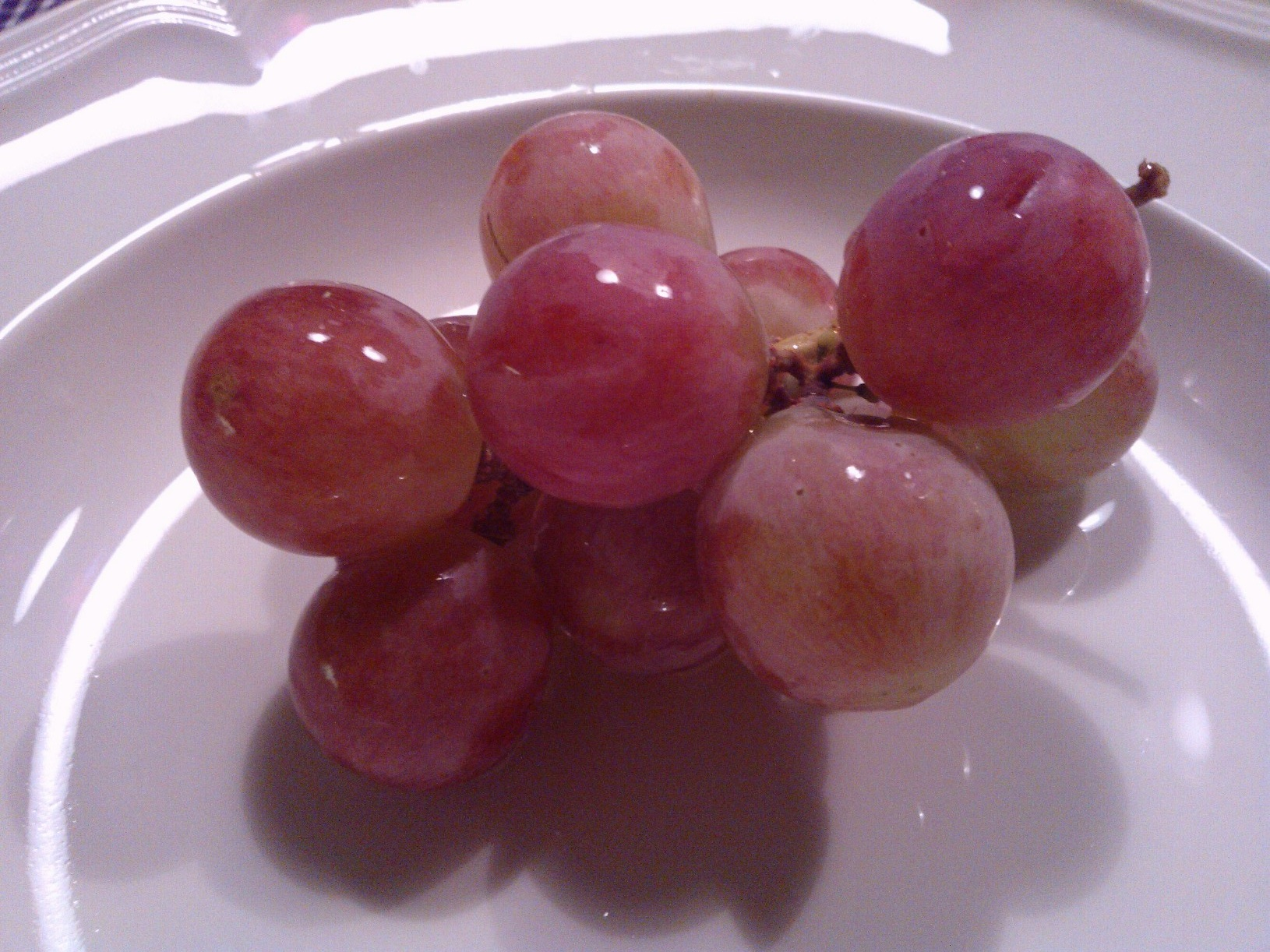

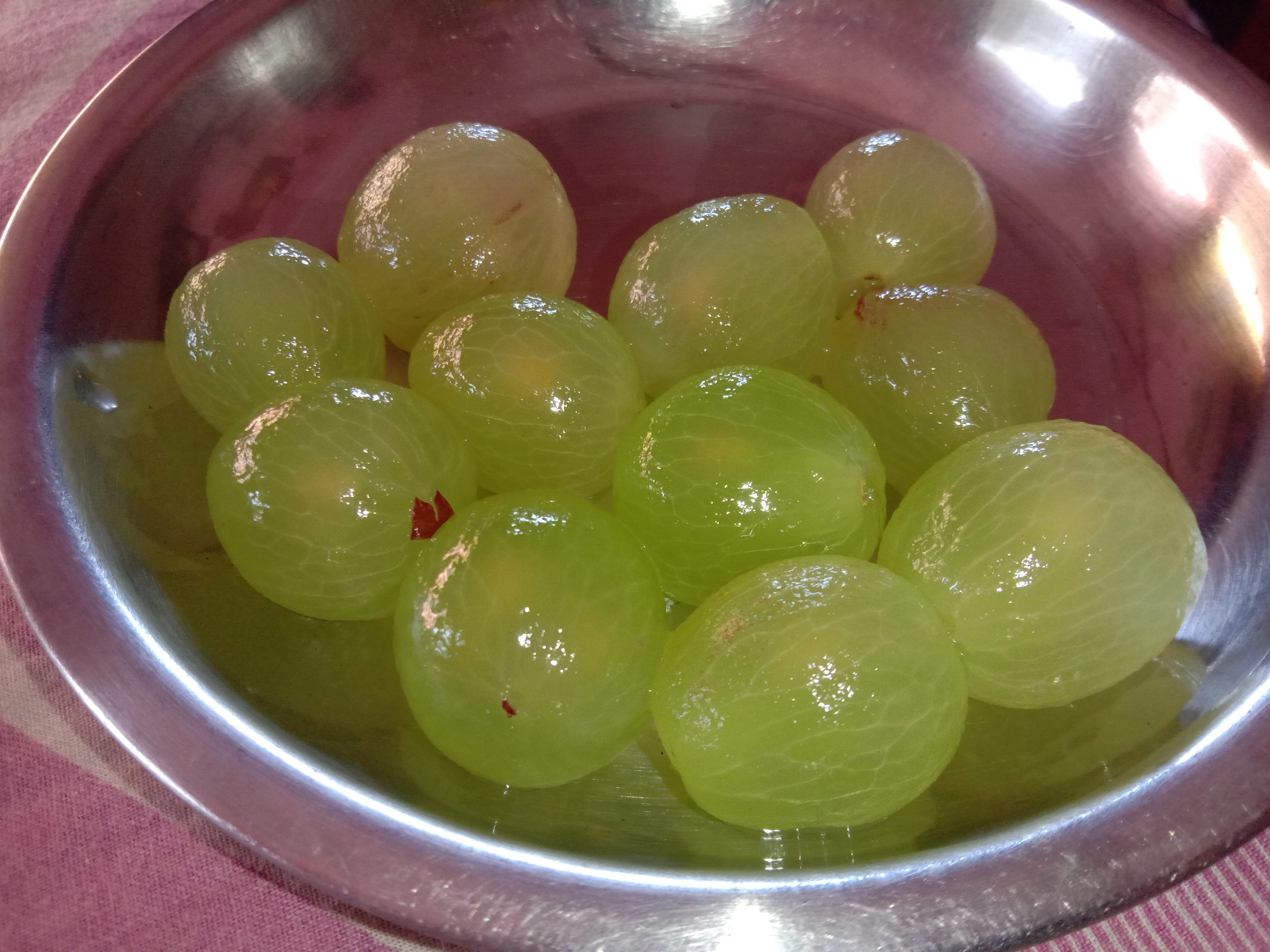
Freshly peeled Red Globe grapes in West Bengal, India.

The Red Globe is a variety of very large, seeded red grapes with firm flesh used mainly as a table grape. It can be grown outdoors in very warm areas with long growing seasons such as California, Chile or Australia, but in most of the world it is strictly a greenhouse grape.

Red Globe grapes can be consumed fresh, dried for raisins, and also used for various grape juices. Because of their large size, they can be used as ice cubes in beverages when frozen.
