= Chen Xu (geologist) =

Chinese geologist

- 陈旭
- Born: 17 September 1936 (age 89); Nanjing, Jiangsu, China
- Education: China University of Geosciences
- Scientific career
- Fields: Paleontology; Stratigraphy
- Workplaces: Nanjing Institute of Geology and Paleontology, Chinese Academy of Sciences

Chinese name
- Simplified Chinese: 陈旭
- Traditional Chinese: 陳旭
Transcriptions
Standard Mandarin
- Hanyu Pinyin: Chén Xù

Chen Xu (born 17 September 1936) is a Chinese geologist who is a researcher at the Nanjing Institute of Geology and Paleontology, and an academician of the Chinese Academy of Sciences.

== Biography ==
Chen was born in Nanjing, Jiangsu, on 17 September 1936, while his ancestral home in Huzhou, Zhejiang. After graduating from Beijing Institute of Geology (now China University of Geosciences) in 1959, he was despatched to the Nanjing Institute of Geology and Paleontology, where he was promoted to associate research fellow in January 1983 and to research fellow in January 1988. He was a visiting scholar at the University of Western Ontario from 1981 to 1983.

== Honours and awards ==
- 2003 Member of the Chinese Academy of Sciences
- 2008 State Natural Science Award (Second Class) for studying on Cambrian and Ordovician global stratotype sections and points (Golden nails) and chronostratigraphic Division
