= Bao Gang =

Chinese politician

Bao Gang 包钢 ᠪᠠᠣ ᠭᠠᠩ

Chairman of the Inner Mongolia Autonomous Region
- Incumbent
- Assumed office 13 October 2025
- Party Secretary: Wang Weizhong
- Preceded by: Wang Lixia

Party Secretary of Hohhot
- In office 24 September 2021 – 20 December 2025
- Deputy: He Haidong (Mayor)
- Preceded by: Wang Lixia
- Succeeded by: Yu Huiwen

Vice Chairman of the Inner Mongolia Autonomous Region
- In office 26 July 2018 – 30 September 2021
- Chairwoman: Bu Xiaolin → Wang Lixia

Party Secretary of Alxa League
- In office 22 September 2015 – 25 October 2018
- Deputy: Yang Bo (League Chief)
- Preceded by: Yun Xishun
- Succeeded by: Yang Bo

Mayor of Baotou
- In office 16 December 2013 – 30 October 2015
- Party Secretary: Wang Zhonghe
- Preceded by: Sun Weidong
- Succeeded by: Du Xuejun

Mayor of Wuhai
- In office 8 July 2013 – 10 December 2013
- Party Secretary: Hou Fengqi
- Preceded by: Hou Fengqi
- Succeeded by: Bi Lifu

Personal details
- Born: May 1969 (age 57) Fuxin, Liaoning, China
- Party: China Communist Party
- Website: Chairman of the Inner Mongolia Autonomous Region

Chinese name
- Simplified Chinese: 包钢
- Traditional Chinese: 包鋼
Transcriptions
Standard Mandarin
- Hanyu Pinyin: Bāo Gāng

Bao Gang (Chinese: 包钢; Mongolian: ᠪᠠᠣ
ᠭᠠᠩ; born May 1969) is a Chinese politician of Mongolian ethnicity from Fuxin, Liaoning Province, currently serving as Deputy CCP Party Secretary and Government Chairman of the Inner Mongolia Autonomous Region, as well as the Party Secretary of Hohhot. He graduated from the Department of Economics at Inner Mongolia University and has held several key positions including Mayor of Wuhai and Baotou, Party Secretary of Alxa League, and Vice Chairman of the Inner Mongolia Autonomous Region. He is a member of the 20th Central Committee of the Chinese Communist Party.

== Biography ==
From 1987 to 1991, Bao studied in the Department of Economics at Inner Mongolia University, majoring in National Economic Management.

In July 1991, Bao began his career as a staff member in the Information Division of the General Office of the People's Government of Inner Mongolia Autonomous Region. During this period, from February to December 1992, he took part in a social education campaign in Taolisu Sumu, Uxin Banner, Inner Mongolia.

In April 1994, he became an assistant principal staff member in the Party Committee Office of the General Office of the People's Government of Inner Mongolia. In December 1996, he was appointed Secretary of the Communist Youth League Committee and principal staff member of the Personnel Division of the same office.

In May 1998, he was promoted to Deputy Director of the Personnel Division of the General Office of the People's Government of Inner Mongolia. During this time, from July to December 1999, he was seconded to the Inner Mongolia "Three Emphases" Office (an ideological education campaign unit).

In June 2000, he was appointed Director of the Administrative Service Center of the General Office of the People's Government of Inner Mongolia. From September 2001 to January 2002, he attended the second training program for young and middle-aged cadres at the Party School of the Inner Mongolia Autonomous Region Committee.

In March 2002, he became Deputy Director of the Bureau of Administrative Affairs for Government Offices of the People's Government of Inner Mongolia.

In December 2004, he was appointed Member of the Party Committee and Secretary of the Discipline Inspection Commission of the Inner Mongolia State-owned Assets Supervision and Administration Commission (SASAC). During this time, he studied in the 19th Advanced Training Class for League, City, and Department-Level Cadres (from November 2005 to January 2006), and pursued graduate studies in Public Administration at the Party School of the Inner Mongolia Autonomous Region (from August 2003 to December 2005).

In September 2006, Bao became a Member of the Standing Committee of the CPC Hohhot Municipal Committee and Secretary of the Hohhot Municipal Commission for Discipline Inspection.

In January 2008, he was elected Vice Mayor of Hohhot. Between September 2007 and July 2009, he studied at the School of Economics and Management of Tsinghua University, earning a Master of Business Administration (MBA) degree.

In September 2010, Bao was transferred to Wuhai, where he served as Deputy Party Secretary of its Committee and the Secretary of Municipal Commission for Discipline Inspection.

In June 2013, he became Acting Mayor of Wuhai, and was formally elected Mayor in October 2013.

In December 2013, he was appointed Deputy Party Secretary and Acting Mayor of Baotou, and was officially elected Mayor in January 2014.

In September 2015, Bao was promoted to Party Secretary of Alxa League.

In July 2018, he became Vice Chairman and Member of the Party Leadership Group of the People's Government of Inner Mongolia Autonomous Region.

In September 2021, he was appointed a Standing Member of the Inner Mongolia Autonomous Regional Party Committee and Party Secretary of Hohhot.

In September 2025, Bao was named Deputy Party Secretary of the CPC Inner Mongolia Autonomous Regional Committee and Secretary of the Party Leadership Group of the Regional Government.

In October 2025, he was appointed Vice and Acting Chairman of the People's Government of Inner Mongolia Autonomous Region. He officially took the Chairman position in the same month.

Government offices
Preceded by Wang Lixia	Chairman of the Inner Mongolia Region; 2025–	Incumbent
Preceded by Hou Fengqi	Mayor of Wuhai; 2013	Succeeded by Bi Lifu
Preceded by Sun Weidong	Mayor of Baotou; 2013–2015	Succeeded by Du Xuejun
Party political offices
Preceded by Wang Lixia	Party Secretary of Hohhot; 2021–2025	Succeeded by Yu Huiwen
Preceded by Yun Xishun	Party Secretary of Alxa League; 2015–2018	Succeeded by Yang Bo
