= Yun Guangzhong =

Chinese politician

- 云光中

Communist Party Secretary of Hohhot
- In office November 2016 – August 2019
- Preceded by: Nashun Menghe
- Succeeded by: Wang Lixia

Vice-Chairman of the Inner Mongolia
- In office January 2014 – January 2017
- Chairman: Bagatur→Bu Xiaolin
- Preceded by: Bu Xiaolin

Communist Party Secretary of Ordos City
- In office February 2011 – January 2014
- Preceded by: Du Zi
- Succeeded by: Bai Yugang

Mayor of Ordos City
- In office November 2008 – February 2011
- Preceded by: Du Zi
- Succeeded by: Lian Su

Communist Party Secretary of Manzhouli
- In office October 2006 – February 2008
- Succeeded by: Han Xianjun

Mayor of Manzhouli
- In office January 2004 – October 2006
- Succeeded by: Yang Bo

Personal details
- Born: June 1960 (age 66) Tumed Left Banner, Hohhot, Inner Mongolia, China
- Party: Chinese Communist Party (expelled; November 1979-December 2019)
- Education: China University of Political Science and Law; Inner Mongolia Agricultural University

Chinese name
- Traditional Chinese: 雲光中
- Simplified Chinese: 云光中
Transcriptions
Standard Mandarin
- Hanyu Pinyin: Yún Guāngzhōng

Yun Guangzhong (Chinese: 云光中; born June 1960) is a former Chinese politician who spent his entire career in north China's Inner Mongolia. He is of Mongol descent. As of June 2019 he was under investigation by China's top anti-corruption agency. Previously he served as party chief of the capital city Hohhot. Prior to that, he was vice-chairman of the Inner Mongolia between 2014 and 2017, party chief of Ordos City between 2011 and 2014, mayor of Ordos between 2008 and 2011, party chief of Manzhouli between 2006 and 2008, and mayor of Manzhouli between 2004 and 2006.

He was a delegate to the 18th and 19th National Congress of the Chinese Communist Party.

== Education ==
Yun was born in Tumed Left Banner, Hohhot, Inner Mongolia, in June 1960. In September 1989, he entered China University of Political Science and Law, where he majored in law. He earned his master's degree in agricultural economy from Inner Mongolia Agricultural University in January 2001. He also received his master's degree in management from the technology and innovation courses jointly organized by Tsinghua University and Australian National University in December 2007.

== Career ==
After the Cultural Revolution, he entered politics in October 1977. He served in various posts in the Public Security Bureau and then Procuratorate of Tumed Left Banner before serving as its executive deputy head in December 1993. He served as magistrate of Helin County from April 1997 to November 1998, and party chief, the top political position in the county, from November 1998 to January 2001. He was head of the Organization Department of Wuhai in January 2001, and held that office until November 2003. He became the deputy party chief and mayor of Manzhouli, a county-level city under the jurisdiction of Hulunbuir, in November 2003, and then party chief, the top political position in the city, beginning in October 2006. In February 2008, he was transferred to Ordos City and appointed deputy party chief, rising to party chief in February 2011. He was promoted to vice-chairman of the Inner Mongolia Autonomous Region People's Government in January 2014, a position he held until January 2017. He was appointed party chief of the capital city Hohhot in November 2016, and held the position for almost three years until he was sacked for graft.

== Investigation ==
On June 11, 2019, he was put under investigation for alleged "serious violations of discipline and laws" by the Central Commission for Discipline Inspection (CCDI), the party's internal disciplinary body, and the National Supervisory Commission, the highest anti-corruption agency of China. On 1 December, he had been expelled from the Chinese Communist Party and removed from public office. He was taken away on 31 December. On July 16, 2020, the Dalian Intermediate People's Court held a public hearing on the case of Yun Guangzhong. Prosecutors accused Yun of taking advantage of his various positions, accepting money and gifts worth 94.32 million yuan (about $13.48 million). On November 3, he was sentenced to 14 years in prison for taking bribes and was also fined 5.5 million yuan ($822,220).

Government offices
Preceded by ?	Mayor of Manzhouli; 2003-2006	Succeeded by Yang Bo (杨博)
Preceded by Du Zi (杜梓)	Mayor of Ordos City; 2008-2011	Succeeded by Lian Su (廉素)
Party political offices
Preceded by ?	Communist Party Secretary of Manzhouli; 2006-2008	Succeeded by Han Xianjun (韩宪军)
Preceded by Du Zi (杜梓)	Communist Party Secretary of Ordos City; 2011-2014	Succeeded by Bai Yugang (白玉刚)
Preceded by Nashun Menghe (那顺孟和)	Communist Party Secretary of Hohhot; 2016-2019	Succeeded by Wang Lixia
