= Li Jiexiang =

Chinese politician

- 李杰翔

Vice Chairman of Qinghai Provincial People's Congress
- In office 25 January 2022 – 7 April 2022
- Chairman: Wang Jianjun

Executive Vice Governor of Qinghai
- In office September 2019 – January 2022
- Governor: Wang Jianjun; Wu Xiaojun

Personal details
- Born: March 1964 (age 62) Jungar Banner, Inner Mongolia, China
- Party: Chinese Communist Party (1985–2022; expelled)
- Education: Baotou Normal School; Central Party School of the Chinese Communist Party; Cheung Kong Graduate School of Business

Chinese name
- Simplified Chinese: 李杰翔
- Traditional Chinese: 李傑翔
Transcriptions
Standard Mandarin
- Hanyu Pinyin: Lǐ Jiéxiáng

Li Jiexiang (Chinese: 李杰翔; born March 1964) is a former Chinese politician. He was investigated by China's top anti-graft agency in April 2022. Previously he served as vice chairman of Qinghai Provincial People's Congress and before that, executive vice governor of Qinghai. He is a representative of the 19th National Congress of the Chinese Communist Party.

== Biography ==
Li was born in Jungar Banner, Inner Mongolia, in March 1964. In 1982, he entered Baotou Normal School, majoring in Chinese language and literature. After graduation in 1985, he stayed and worked at the school.

He joined the Chinese Communist Party (CCP) in January 1985, and got involved in politics in June 1986. He was vice mayor of Holingol in November 1994 and vice governor of Qingshan District in November 1997. He served as governor of Shiguai District from October 2000 to December 2002, and party secretary, the top political position in the district, from December 2002 to November 2003. Then he served as party secretary of Tumd Right Banner and chairman of its People's Congress. He became vice mayor and a member of the Standing Committee of the CCP Baotou Committee in September 2010 before being assigned to the similar position in Tongliao in August 2011. He was deputy director of the Development and Reform Commission of Inner Mongolia Autonomous Region and director of the Energy Development Bureau of Inner Mongolia Autonomous Region in May 2013, and held that office until April 2015. In April 2015, he was promoted to acting mayor of the capital city Hohhot, confirmed in January 2017. In May 2017, he was promoted again to become party secretary of Tongliao, and served until September 2019.

In September 2019, he was transferred to northwest China's Qinghai province, where he was appointed executive vice governor and was admitted to member of the standing committee of the CCP Qinghai Provincial Committee, the province's top authority. In January 2022, he was made vice chairman of Qinghai Provincial People's Congress.

== Downfall ==
On 7 April 2022, he was put under investigation for alleged "serious violations of discipline and laws" by the Central Commission for Discipline Inspection (CCDI), the party's internal disciplinary body, and the National Supervisory Commission, the highest anti-corruption agency of China. On 19 September 2022, Li was expelled from the party over violations of Party discipline and laws.

Government offices
Preceded by Qin Yi	Mayor of Hohhot; 2015–2017	Succeeded by Feng Yuzhen
Preceded by Wang Yubo	Executive Vice Governor of Qinghai; 2019–2022	Succeeded by Wang Weidong
Party political offices
Preceded by Song Liang	Communist Party Secretary of Tongliao; 2017–2019	Succeeded by Feng Yuzhen
