= 2020 Inner Mongolia protests =

- Part of racism in China and protest and dissent in China
- Date: 31 August – 2 September 2020
- Location: Inner Mongolia, China
- Caused by: A two-part curriculum reform that (1) replaced Mongolian as the medium of instruction with Standard Chinese in three particular subjects, and (2) replaced three regional textbooks, printed in Mongolian script, by the nationally-unified textbook series
- Goals: Rescind the curriculum reform
- Methods: Student strikes, demonstrations
- Result: Government crackdown and the implementation of the curriculum reform

Parties
Parents and students opposing the curriculum reform, most of which are Chinese Mongols	Inner Mongolia Department of Education; People's Police

2020 Inner Mongolia protests
- Traditional Chinese: 2020年內蒙古抗議
- Literal meaning: 2020 Inner Mongolia protest
Transcriptions
Standard Mandarin
- Hanyu Pinyin: 2020 Nián nèiménggǔ kàngyì

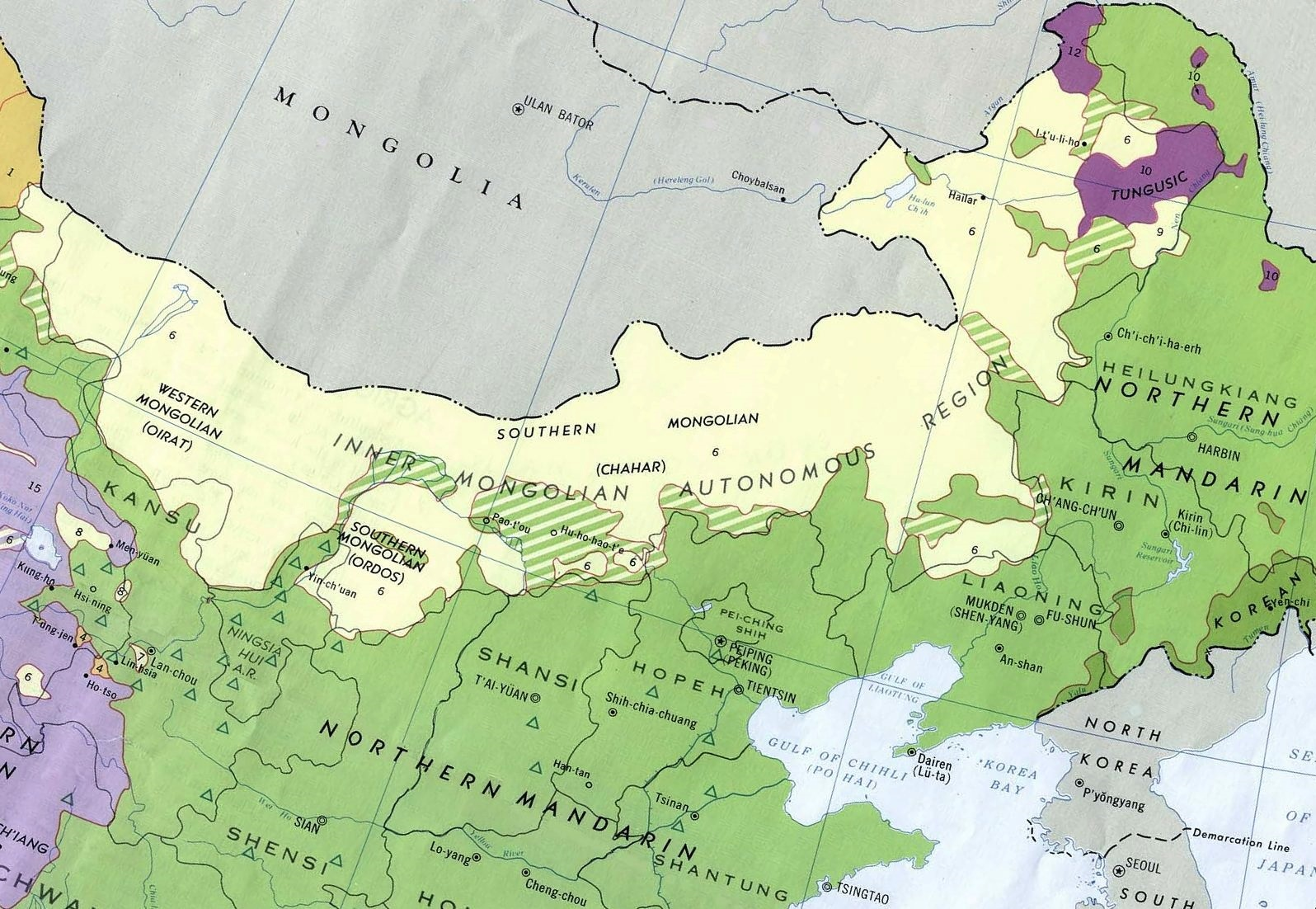
CIA's depiction of the language distribution in Inner Mongolia in 1967, Mongolian and "Northern Mandarin" (a term phased out after 1987, now referred separately as the Jin language, Northeastern Mandarin, and Lanzhou-Ningxia Mandarin)

The 2020 Inner Mongolia protests were a series of protests caused by a curriculum reform imposed on ethnic schools by China's Inner Mongolia Department of Education. The two-part reform replaces Mongolian with Standard Chinese as the medium of instruction in three particular subjects and replaces three regional textbooks, printed in Mongolian script, by the nationally-unified textbook series edited by the Ministry of Education, written in Chinese characters. On a broader scale, the opposition to the curriculum change reflects racism in China and the decline of regional language education in China.

The three subjects in concern are Language and Literature (referring Standard Chinese) from first grade, Morality and Rule of law from first grade (a variant of civic education), and History from seventh grade. The reform was part of the national textbook reform rolled out elsewhere in China from Autumn 2017 to eliminate various provincial textbooks by the nationally unified textbook series, which has been criticized elsewhere in China.

The parents and students of the ethnic schools strongly opposed the curriculum reform. The sentiment spread to other Chinese Mongols not attending those schools, leading to protests. While seen as an attempt to assimilate ethnic minority, observers also note it exemplifies the "second generation's ethnic policy" under Chinese Communist Party (CCP) general secretary and President Xi Jinping, who "envisioned the melting pot formula, as the ultimate solution to the ethnic problems".

== Background ==
=== Political history of Inner Mongolia ===
Inner Mongolia has, for a long time, experienced less violent ethnic strife than Xinjiang and Tibet. The region "was seen to have been largely pacified over many decades of Han migration, intermarriage, and repression". Large-scale Han migration began from 1912 during the Beiyang government period, when land became freely traded. By 1937, the aggregated figure of the census of the Nanking Nationalist government-ruled Suiyuan Province and Chahar Province and the census of Japanese-puppet Manchukuo and Mongol United Autonomous Government, reported 3,720,000 Hans and 860,000 Mongols (roughly 8:2 ratio) within the modern Inner Mongolian boundary. That ratio continues today.

The 1981 Inner Mongolia student protest opposed a package of new policies which worsened steppe degradation and the political representation of Chinese Mongols. The policies included; increasing 100 million cattle in the province, settling, instead of repatriating, the rural-to-urban migrants (盲流) from neighboring provinces, and putting Mongol officials in place in Mongols-majority settlements, while putting Han officials in place in Han-majority settlements. In May 2011, unrest erupted when a coal truck collided and killed a Chinese Mongol herdman, and was later followed with unrests, which complained of the environmental impact of mining and unfair development policies.

=== Pan-Mongolism concerns ===
In 2019, it was revealed that students at a middle school at Chifeng, China's Inner Mongolia, sang and danced in a classroom with the national flag and the national emblem of Mongolia, an independent nation, hung on the wall. This has sparked concerns related to ethnic nationalism and separatism.

In 2022, an ethnic Mongol pilot at Sichuan Airlines was revealed to have published pan-Mongolism and anti-Han comments regarding the Nanjing Massacre in 2015, sparking concerns about ethnic hate and tensions.

=== Origin of protest: Curriculum reform, 2020 ===
The top four languages native to Inner Mongolia are the Jin language, Northeastern Mandarin, varieties of Mongolian dialects, and Lanzhou-Ningxia Mandarin. The majority of Mongols, and almost all Hans, opt to send their children to schools taught in Standard Mandarin, in recognition of the economic opportunities that would reap. Yet, a sizable minority among the Mongols attend ethnic schools, taught primarily in Mongolian.

On 26 August 2020, Inner Mongolia's Department of Education officially published a two-part curriculum reform for ethnic schools. Mongolian as the medium of instruction will be replaced by Standard Mandarin in the three subjects of Language and Literature (referring to Standard Mandarin) from first grade, Morality and Rule of law from first grade (a variant of civic education), and History from seventh grade. The reform was part of the national textbook reform rolled out in China in 2017 to eliminate various provincial textbooks by the nationally-unified textbook series, which has attracted repeated criticism elsewhere in China. This policy has been applied in every province, including Tibet and Xinjiang, and is now making inroads into Inner Mongolia. This policy does not change the education of the Mongolian Language Art itself.

While seen as an attempt to assimilate an ethnic minority, observers also note that it exemplifies the "second-generation's ethnic policy" under paramount leader Xi Jinping, who "envisioned the melting pot formula of the West, in particular the U.S.A., as the ultimate solution to the ethnic problems". Xi Jinping "rejects the old Soviet-based system, which allowed relative autonomy and preservation of language and culture in designated regions, in favor of the new approach".

Using the nationally unified textbooks on those three affected subjects would also mean the application of standard exams, thus would have direct impacts on the student exam grades in important exams, such as the National College Entrance Exams. This could also be a factor causing some parents to protest.

== Protests ==
=== Timeline ===
Signs of public defiance began on 30 August, when students in Inner Mongolia began protesting against the new Mandarin Chinese language program. However, it remained local until 31 August 2020, when the Inner Mongolian education department announced that the Mongolian language would be removed in history, politics, language, and literature subjects, starting from 1 September, and will become official, with other subjects to be added.

Following the announcement, thousands of ethnic Mongols protested what they saw as an attempt to turn the Mongolian language into a foreign language in their homeland. The protesters considered this as an attempt by the Chinese government to curb them from learning the Mongolian language and to disconnect them from their nomadic background. Many Mongol families announced they would not send their children to schools until the Mongolian language is reinstated as an education language in Inner Mongolia.

In a similar case in Tongliao, a prefecture of Inner Mongolia, parents found out about the announcement only after sending their kids to a boarding school, which led to the protests. The parents besieged the school before being repelled by the police. The authorities released their children from the school despite rampant pressure. Resentment against forced Mandarin-based education was also reflected on Chinese social media by Mongol users. However, it was removed by the authorities.

On 1 September, staff at a school in Naiman Banner told the BBC that only around 40 students had registered for the semester, in place of the usual 1,000. Some subsequently changed their minds, and only some 10 remained. At the same time, 300,000 ethnic Mongol students went on strike against the policy imposed by Beijing. Even among those ethnic Mongols who support Chinese government, many Mongols objected at the plan, with one Mongol, using the short video app Kuaishou, saying, "I am Chinese, I am Mongolian, you can take anything from me except my mother language. Without language, I cannot say that I am Mongolian," in a following demonstration against the policy.

On 2 September, several ethnic Mongols participated in the raising of the khar suld (Black Banner in Mongolian). The khar suld has an implied connotation used only when Mongols fought against an enemy.

== Reactions ==
=== Mainland China ===
Chinese state media, like Xinhua News Agency and China Daily, largely ignored the protests and its demands at first, instead focusing on the planned festivals held in Inner Mongolia, to the social life of ethnic Mongols. However, at the same time, Chinese officials traveled to Inner Mongolia and tried to persuade families to send their children back to school, although there was a strong objection from Mongol families.

In early September, State Councilor and police minister Zhao Kezhi visited the region to strengthen the fight against "terrorism and separatism" during a tour to parts of the province. Chinese police of the region offered a 1,000 yuan bounty for anyone who could identify people participating in anti-government protests.

At the same time, the Chinese police force had been deployed and increased its activities across Inner Mongolia, with a number of people arrested for supporting the protests. Families that refused to send children to schools may be stripped of social benefits by the government.

On 4 September, a journalist for the Los Angeles Times was allegedly detained for four hours before being expelled by the Chinese authorities for her coverage.

On 13 September, some counties' governments required guardians to send their children to school or they would be fined for up to 5000 yuan in response to the student strike.

On 1 December, reports said that the Chinese government is mass recruiting secondary school teachers to work in the northern region of Inner Mongolia. Online government documents issued in the weeks since the protests rocked the region in early September revealed government plans to hire more than 1,000 teachers across the region.

Local banner and league governments across the region have also posted recruitment ads for hundreds of teachers from elsewhere in China to relocate to the region and teach Mandarin.

=== International ===
In Taipei, Former Council of Indigenous Peoples minister Yohani Isqaqavut, who is a Presbyterian pastor, and other members of the church's Indigenous Ministry Committee, held placards at a rally outside the Legislative Yuan in Taipei to express support for people in China's Inner Mongolia.

Many Mongolians were outraged following the reports, although economic dependence on China largely undermines the opportunity to help. Dozens of Mongolian protesters marched to the Ministry of Foreign Affairs headquarters in Ulaanbaatar and demanded a reaction against ongoing repression of Mongol rights in China. The leader of the IMPP, Temtsiltu Shobtsood, who lives in exile in Germany, accused China of "trying to suppress" the Mongolian language.

In September 2020, the Congressional-Executive Commission on China issued a statement condemning the suppression of the protests and an assault on a U.S. journalist covering the protests. The same month, an international petition and movement by ethnic Mongols, "Save the Mongolian Language in Southern \Inner\ Mongolia," was started.

On 24 and 25 November, hundreds of Mongolians living in Japan protested outside the National Assembly in Tokyo, calling on the Chinese Communist Party not to end Mongolian-medium education in Inner Mongolia. The protesters held up banners and placards in Mongolian, Chinese, Japanese, and English, such as "Withdraw the sinicization policy!", "Stop oppressing Mongolians!", and "Give Mongolians back their mother tongue!"

== See also ==
- 1981 Inner Mongolia student protest on steppe degradation
- Soviet-era Korenizatsiya
- Melting pot
- Racism in China
- Ethnic groups in Chinese history
- Mongols in China
