= 1981 Inner Mongolia student protest =

Student-led protest against cultural and political policies

The 1981 Inner Mongolia student protest, was a student-led protest which took place in Inner Mongolia from 22 August to 15 November 1981, opposing a package of new policies that would worsen steppe degradation in the Inner Mongolia steppe and worsen the political representation of Chinese Mongols. The new policies included "we shall have 100 million cattle within the next decade", "the influx of rural-to-urban migrants from neighboring provinces shall be settled rather than be blocked" and "placing Mongol officials in place in Mongol-majority settlements and Han officials in place in Han-majority settlements". The protest were mostly organized by the students of Inner Mongolia University. The policies were proposed by then Inner Mongolia Chief party secretary Zhou Hui and sanctioned by the Secretariat of the Chinese Communist Party at its meeting on 16 July 1981, chaired by then top party secretary Hu Yaobang.

Hu, known for his restrained approach towards students, ordered Zhou Hui to not arrest any students. As promised, the students were left unscathed, but many bureaucrats, school headmasters and teachers were demoted.

== See also ==
  - 1989 Tiananmen Square protests and massacre, also handled by Hu Yaobang
  - 2020 Inner Mongolia protests, on bilingual education policy
  - Migration in China
  - Grassland degradation
  - Racism in China
