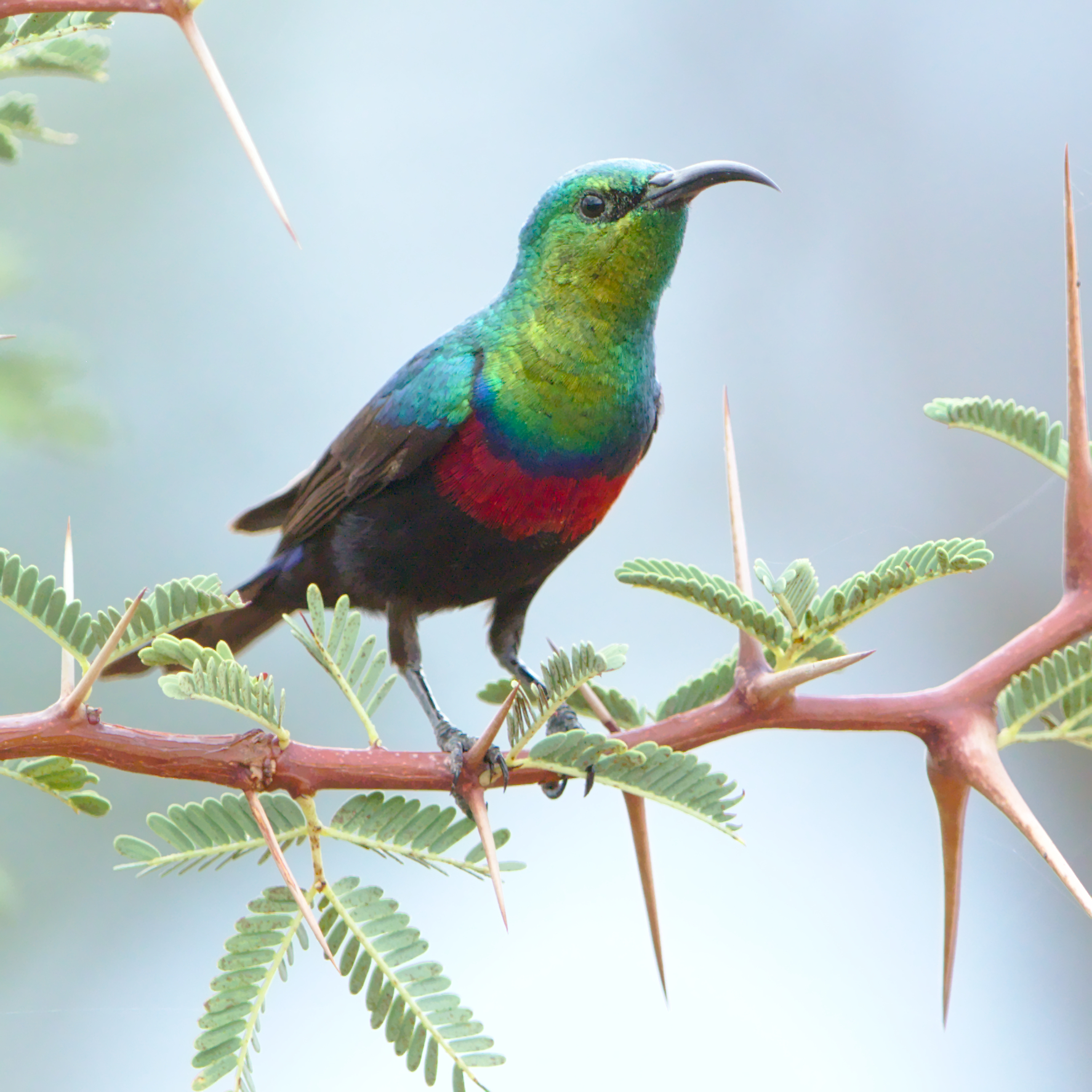

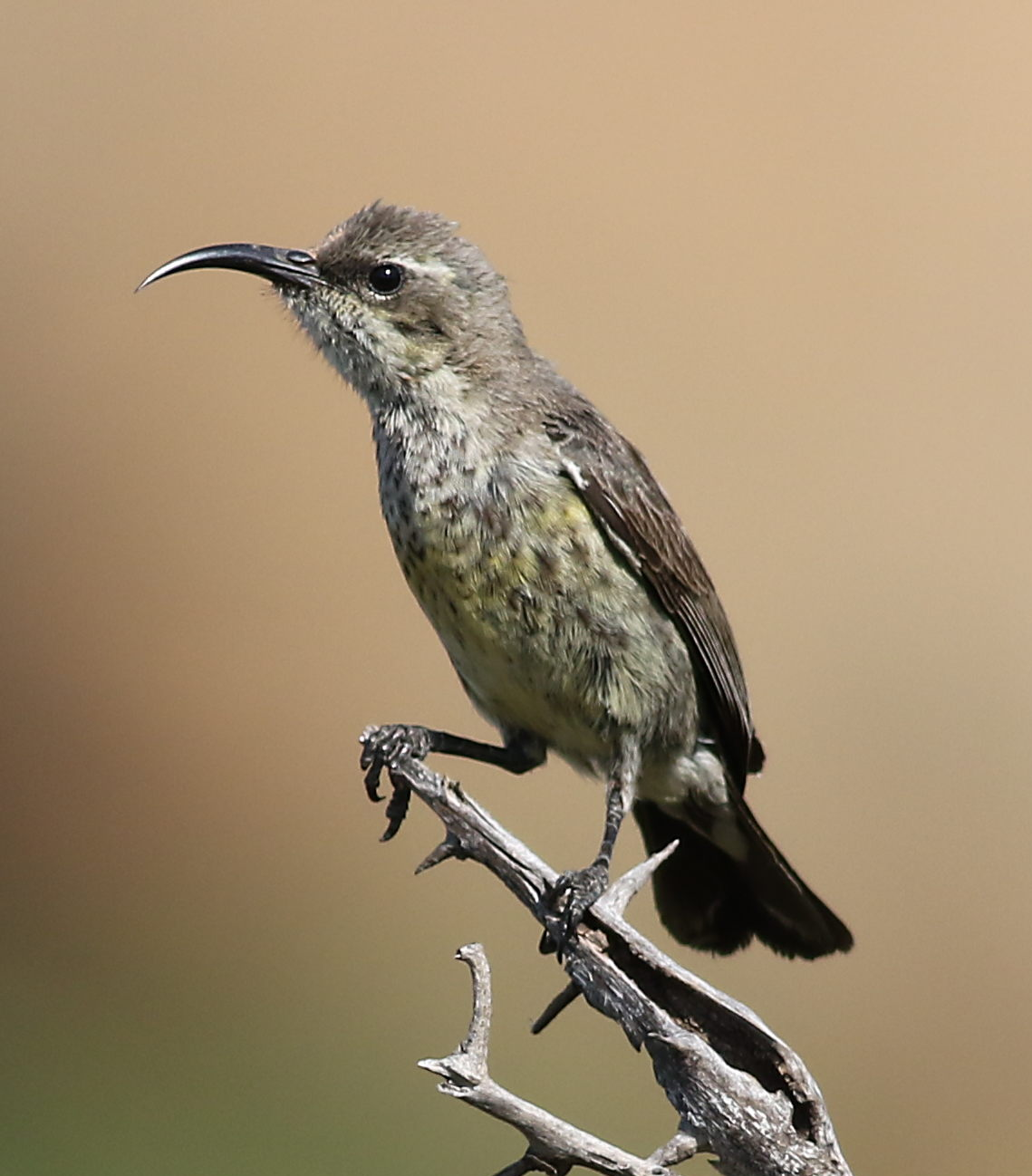
- The male and female at Marakele and Mapungubwe National Parks respectively Song recorded in Kruger National Park, South Africa

Conservation status
- Least Concern (IUCN 3.1)

Scientific classification
- Kingdom: Animalia
- Phylum: Chordata
- Class: Aves
- Order: Passeriformes
- Family: Nectariniidae
- Genus: Cinnyris
- Species: C. mariquensis

Binomial name
- Cinnyris mariquensis Smith, 1836

Synonyms
- Nectarinia mariquensis

= Marico sunbird =

Species of bird

The Marico sunbird (Cinnyris mariquensis) is a species of bird in the family Nectariniidae, which is native to woodlands of the eastern and southern Afrotropics.The bird is typically found in the southeast of the continent of Africa. It is of least concern on the IUCN Red List and has an unknown population size that has yet to be quantified. The Marico sunbird has conservation regions located all over its range, so it is unlikely to go extinct.

== Range ==
It is found in Angola, Botswana, Burundi, Eritrea, Eswatini, Ethiopia, Kenya, Mozambique, Namibia, Rwanda, Somalia, South Africa, South Sudan, Tanzania, Uganda, Zambia, and Zimbabwe.

=== Range expansion ===
The African population of Marico sunbird was spotted on various occasions in between July and August 2016 in locations southwest of where its previously believed range ended. These records raised a red flag of a southward range expansion and therefore a more detailed investigation of the range expansion of the species was needed. The range of these birds is expanding into the Northern Cape and Free state provinces in central South Africa.

There are several theories as to why these birds are expanding or changing their range. It is believed that drought or floods can cause the species to search for a more favourable environment in the nearby vicinity. Since 2014, a severe drought has ravaged large parts of western and central South Africa, serving as a potential explanation for the southward movements of the Marico sunbird.

The current range change map was made by comparing the results of the first and second South African Birds Atlas Project's that were undertaken about 20 years apart.

It is interesting that they are expanding into the southwest of Africa with drier spaces and fewer trees than is usual for woodlands species. This signifies that it is also possible that physiology and behaviour are playing a role in the southwestern migration of the species.

== Population surveys in South Africa ==
The Marico sunbird increased in population from 5 to 23 in a South African study between 1998 and 2008 according to the data presented of the 109 species in a study of bird communities in Eswatini savannas and how changes in those bird communities have occurred due to shrub encroachment. This shrub encroachment has created more habitats for the Marico sunbird as it is primarily a woodlands species, but can also survive in dry, arid savanna type environments. The Marico sunbird population hasn't been quantified, however it is believed that it is not any lower than the vulnerable population threshold (<10,000 with a >10% continuing decline over 10 years or 3 generations). The Marico sunbird also occurs over a very large range and cannot be considered vulnerable in terms of its range.

=== Recordings ===
The Marico sunbird was recorded in the Kutse Game Reserve in a study of the birds of the Kutse Game Reserve located just south of the Central Kalahari Game Reserve. In general terms, the reserve is representative of the rest of the Kalahari. The Marico sunbird is considered a local migrant to the area, although it is uncommon from October to March.

== Flight patterns ==
The Marico sunbird flies favourably through natural landscapes such as rivers and valleys, like other sunbirds because these landscapes carve a natural flight path within which the bird has ample foraging opportunities while travelling. The same goes for towns or suburbs with landscaped areas which can act as a secondary habitat and resource for migrating birds.

== Effect of shrub encroachment ==
The results of an Eswatini study suggest that shrub encroachment is the primary reason why species frequencies are changing. Shrub encroachment occurs as a result of unmanaged desert land becoming overgrown with vegetation. Woody plants take over the savanna and create more habitat for woodlands species while simultaneously taking liveable habitats away from the open savanna species.

== Gallery ==
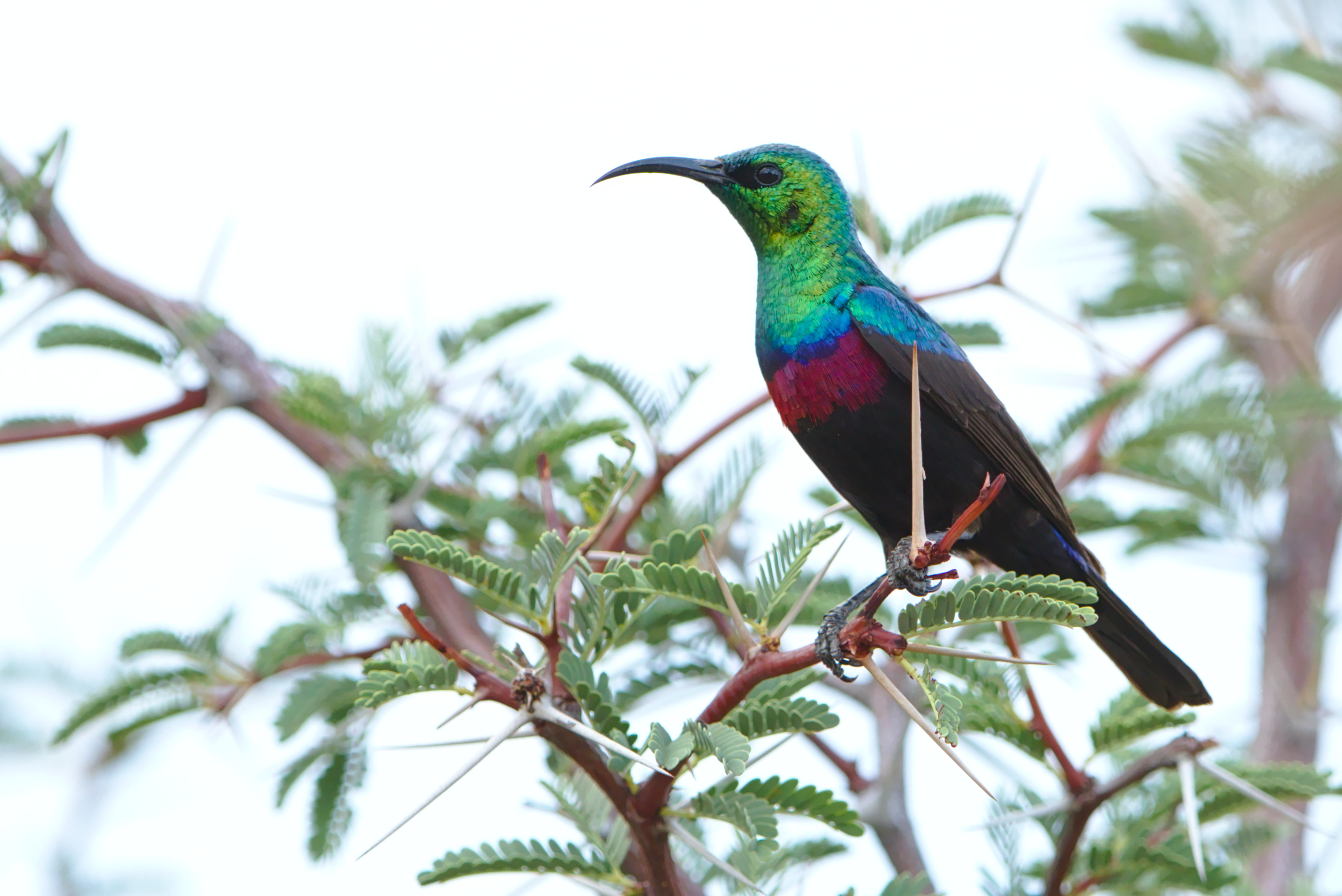
Adult male in thornveld, South Africa

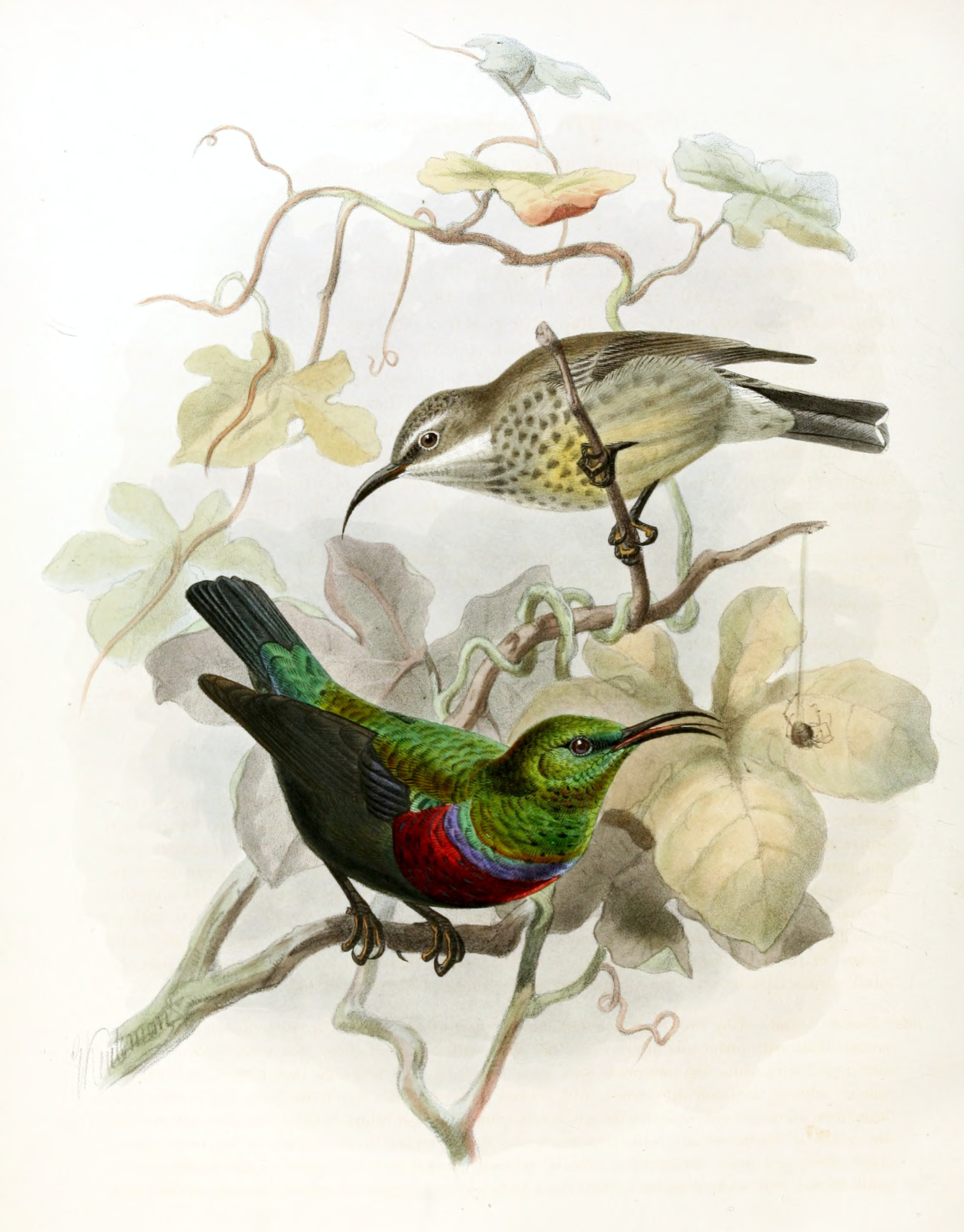
A pair by Keulemans

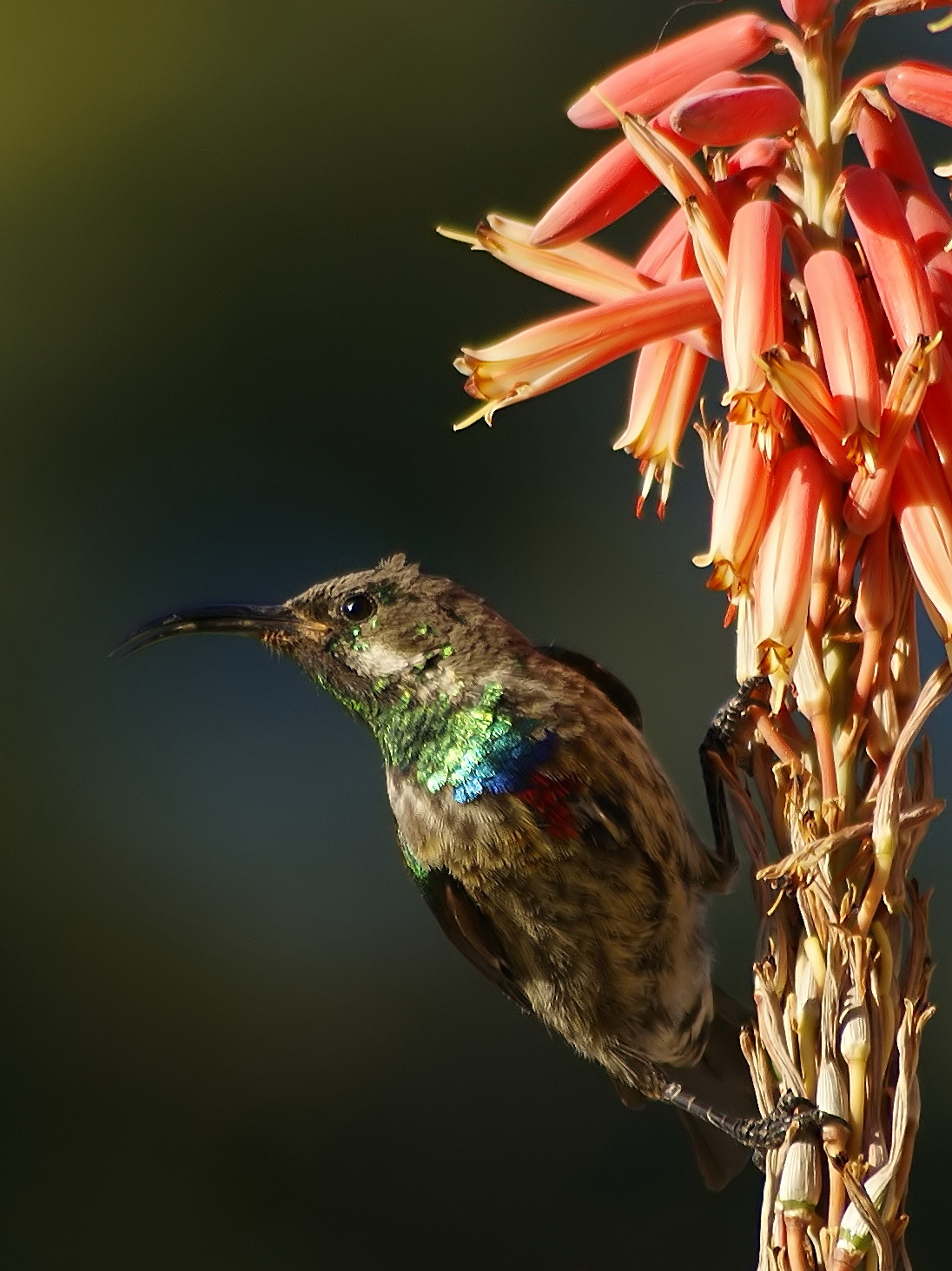
Juvenile male, Namibia

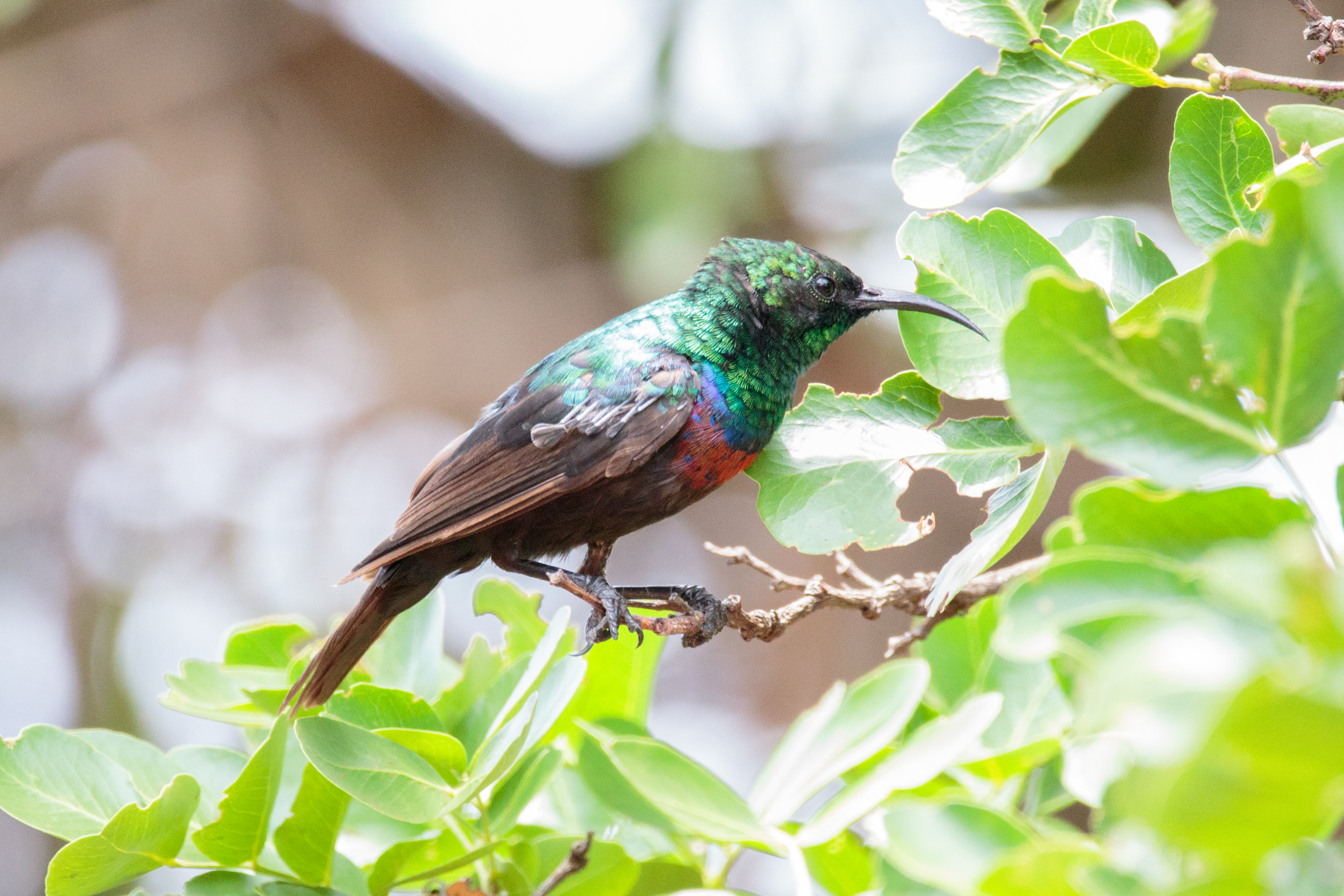
Moulting male in a Schotia tree, South Africa

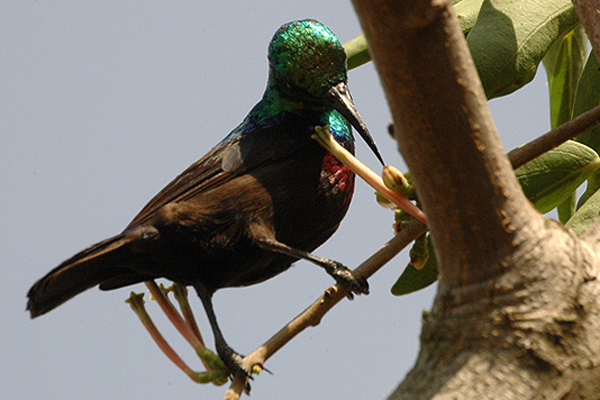
Adult male at mistletoe flowers, Uganda
