= Zhou Hui =

Chinese politician

Zhou Hui (Chinese: 周惠; 1918 – November 18, 2004) was a People's Republic of China politician. He was born in Guannan County, Jiangsu Province. His birth name was Hui Jue (Chinese: 惠珏). He was the younger brother of Hui Yuyu, two-time governor of Jiangsu Province. He changed his name in 1938, when he joined the Chinese Communist Party and went to Yan'an, using his mother's surname as his own. He was Chinese Communist Party Committee Secretary of Hunan Province and Inner Mongolia from 1981 to 1982. At the Mountain Lu Conference in Jiujiang in 1959, Zhou Hui and his predecessor in Hunan, Zhou Xiaozhou, along with Huang Kecheng and Zhang Wentian, gave their support to Peng Dehuai. Unlike Zhou Xiaozhou, Huang and Zhang, Mao did not punish Zhou Hui for his support of Peng. Policies proposed by Zhou resulted in the 1981 Inner Mongolia student protest.
