= Woody plant encroachment =

Vegetation cover change

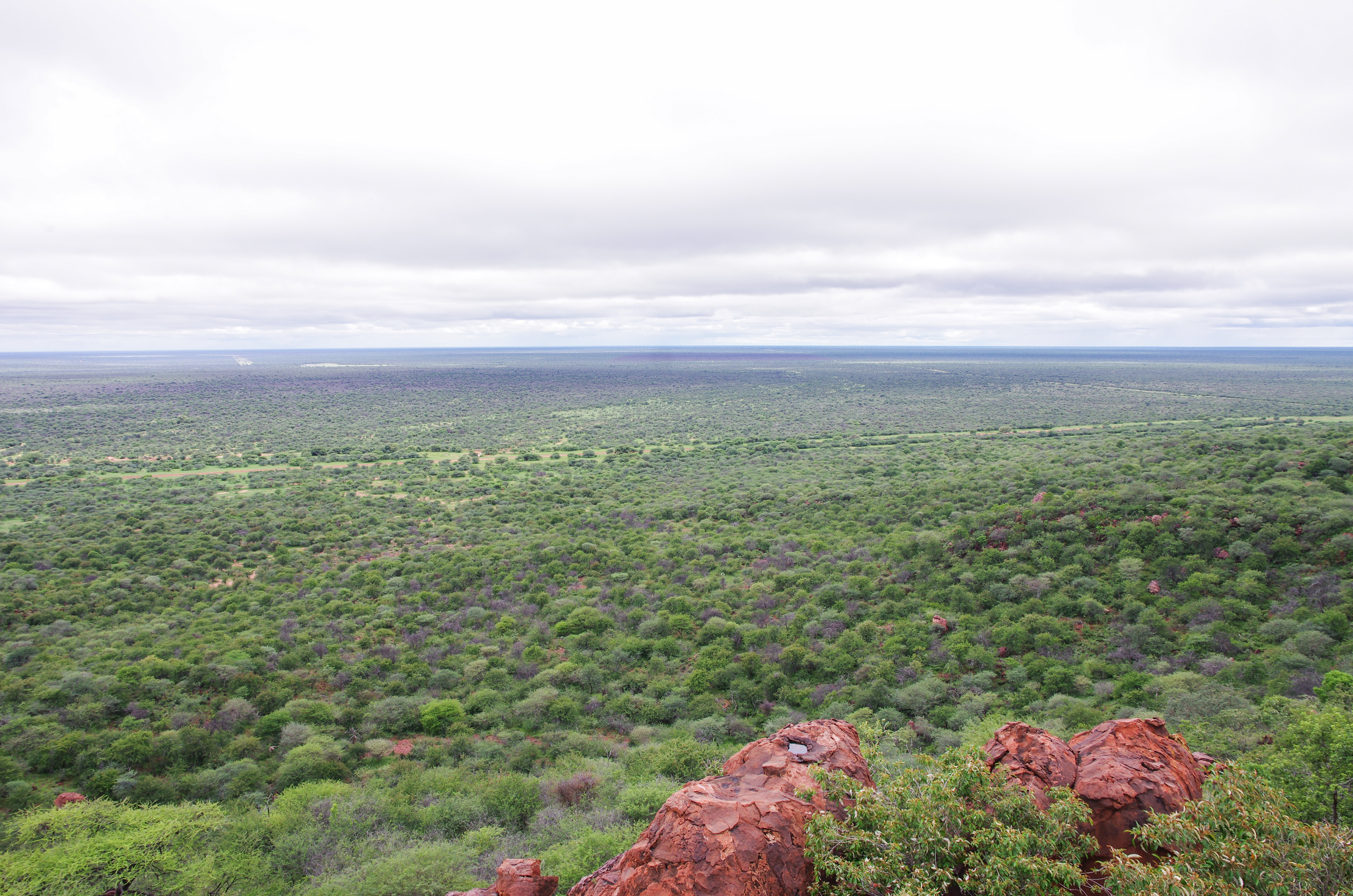
View of bush encroached land at the Waterberg Plateau Park in Otjozondjupa Region, Namibia

Woody plant encroachment (Note: also called woody encroachment, bush encroachment, shrub encroachment, shrubification, woody plant proliferation, or bush thickening) is a natural phenomenon characterised by the area expansion and density increase of woody plants, bushes and shrubs, at the expense of the herbaceous layer, grasses and forbs. It refers to the expansion of native plants and not the spread of alien invasive species. Woody encroachment is observed across different ecosystems and with different characteristics and intensities globally. It predominantly occurs in grasslands, savannas and woodlands and can cause regime shifts from open grasslands and savannas to closed woodlands.

Causes include land-use intensification, such as overgrazing, as well as the suppression of wildfires and the reduction in numbers of wild herbivores. Elevated atmospheric CO_{2} and global warming are found to be accelerating factors. Conversely, land abandonment can likewise lead to woody encroachment.

The impact of woody plant encroachment is highly context specific. It can have severe negative impact on key ecosystem services, especially biodiversity, animal habitat, land productivity and groundwater recharge. Across rangelands, woody encroachment has led to significant declines in productivity, threatening the livelihoods of affected land users. Woody encroachment is often interpreted as a symptom of land degradation due to its negative impacts on key ecosystem services, but is also argued to be a form of natural succession.

Various countries actively counter woody encroachment, through adapted grassland management practices, controlled fire and mechanical bush thinning. Such control measures can lead to trade-offs between climate change mitigation, biodiversity, combatting desertification and strengthening rural incomes. The carbon sequestration effects of woody encroachment are highly context specific; the IPCC states that it may lead to slight increases in carbon, but can simultaneously mask underlying land degradation processes.

== Definition ==
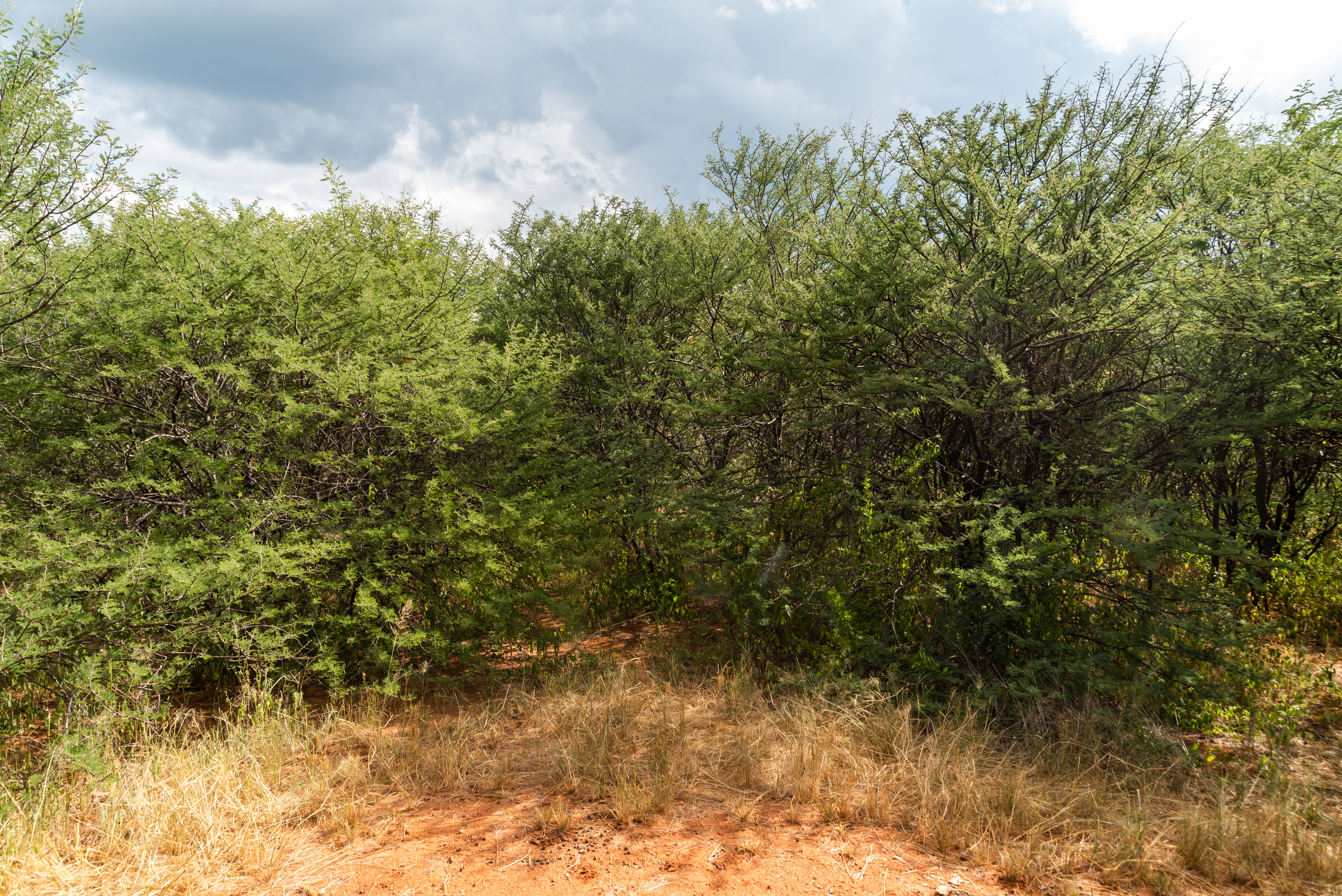
Dense stand of bush on encroached rangeland

Woody plant encroachment is the increase in abundance of indigenous woody plants, such as shrubs and bushes, at the expense of herbaceous plants, grasses and forbs, in grasslands and shrublands. The term encroachment is thus used to describe how woody plants outcompete grasses during a given time, typically years or decades. Although such differentiation is not always applied, encroachment refers to the expansion of woody plants into open areas and thickening refers to the increasing density in a given area, including sub-canopy cover plants. Among earliest published notions of woody plant encroachment are publications of R. Staples in 1945, O. West in 1947 and Heinrich Walter in 1954.

While the terms are used interchangeably in some literature, woody plant encroachment is different from the spread of invasive species. As opposed to invasive species, which are deliberately or accidentally introduced species, encroacher species are indigenous to the respective ecosystem and their classification as encroachers depends on whether they outcompete other indigenous species in the same ecosystem over time. As opposed to alien plant invasion, woody plant encroachment is thus not defined by the mere presence of specific plant species, but by their ecological dynamics and changing dominance.

In some instances, woody plant encroachment is a form of secondary succession or forest regrowth. This applies to cases of land abandonment, for example when previous agricultural land is abandoned and woody plants re-establish. This is distinctly different from woody plant encroachment that occurs due to global drivers, e.g. increased carbon dioxide in Earth's atmosphere, and unsustainable forms of land use intensification, such as overgrazing and fire suppression. Such drivers disrupt the ecological succession in a given grassland, specifically the balance between woody and herbaceous plants, and provide a competitive advantage to woody plants.

By definition, woody plant encroachment occurs in grasslands. It is thus distinctly different from reforestation and afforestation.

== Global extent ==
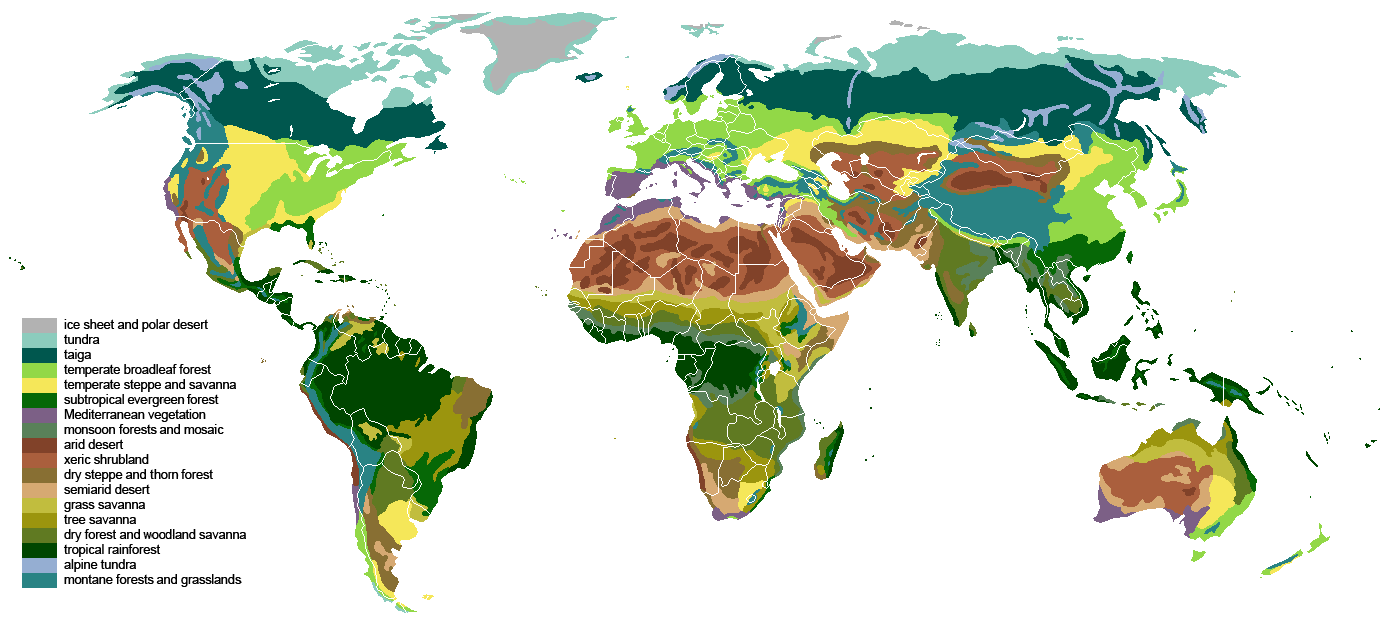
Depiction of terrestrial biomes around the world

The UNCCD identifies woody encroachment as a key contributor to rangeland loss globally. Woody encroachment occurs on all continents, affecting an estimated total area of 500 million hectares (5 million square kilometres). Its causes, extent and response measures differ and are highly context specific. Ecosystems affected by woody encroachment include closed shrublands, open shrublands, woody savannas, savannas, and grasslands. It can occur not only in tropical and subtropical climates, but also in temperate areas. Woody encroachment occurs at 1 percent per decade in the Eurasian steppes, 10–20 percent in North America, 8 percent in South America, 2.4 percent in Africa and 1 percent in Australia. In the European Alps, recorded expansion rates range from 0.6 percent to 16 percent per year.

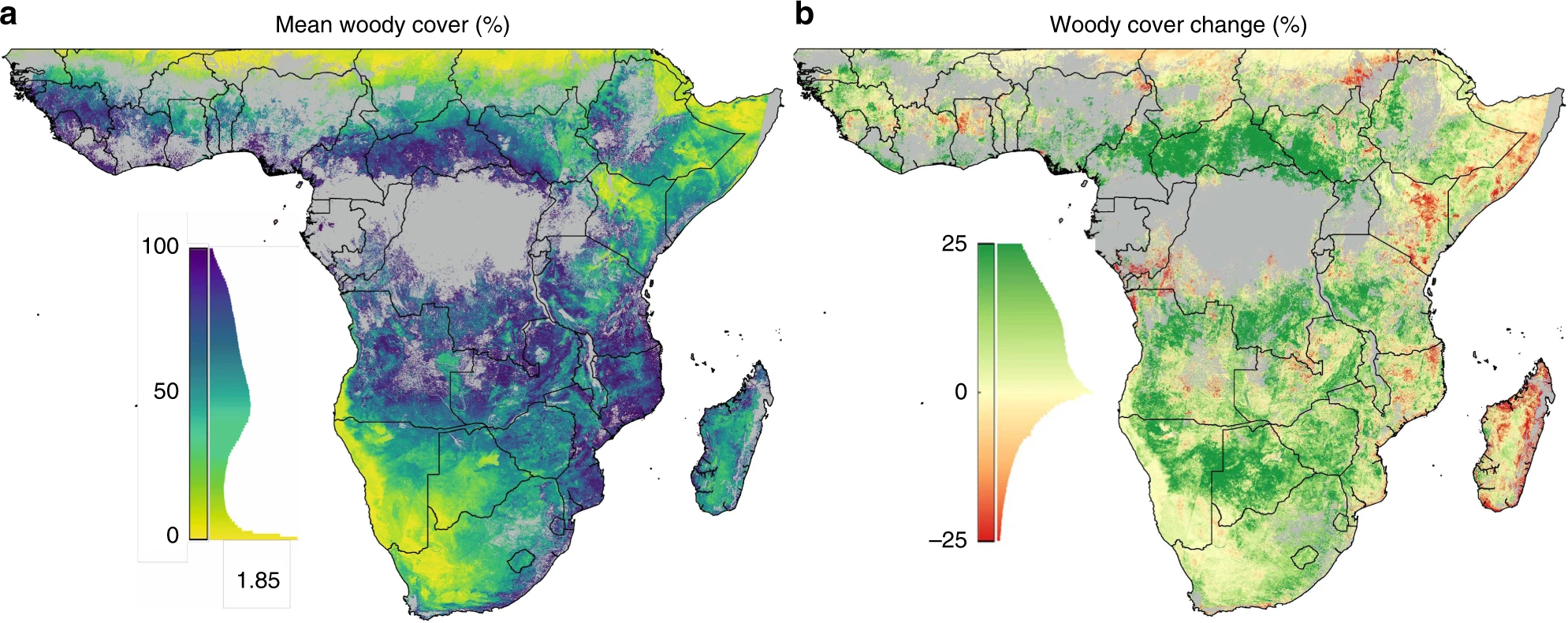
Woody plant cover dynamics over sub-Saharan Africa 1986-2016

In Sub-Saharan Africa, woody vegetation cover has increased by 8% during the past three decades, mainly through woody plant encroachment. Overall, 750 million hectares of non-forest biomes experienced significant net gains in woody plant cover, which is more than three times the area that experienced net losses of woody vegetation. In around 249 million hectares of African rangelands, long-term climate change was found to be the key driver of vegetation change. Across Africa, 29 percent of all trees are found outside classified forests. In some countries, such as Namibia and Botswana, this percentage is above 80 percent and likely linked to woody encroachment. In Southern Africa, woody encroachment has been identified as the main factor of greening, i.e. of the increase in vegetation cover detected through remote sensing. Radar-based mapping of the dry tropics for 2015–2024 found expansion of woody plants into previously grass-dominated land on 16% of non-woody land, including an arc of expansion across the southernmost extent of Africa's dry forests and savannas, with proportional aboveground carbon gains of 1–1.5% per year in the Kalahari woodland and savanna ecoregions. The future trend of biome change through woody encroachment in Africa bears great uncertainty. A global counterfactual assessment of natural vegetation cover suggests that, absent human influence, 43% of land could support trees, 39% shrubs and grasses, and 18% bare ground, and finds that adjustments in fire frequency and wildlife herbivory could have a greater impact on natural vegetation cover than expected climate change by 2050.

In Southern Europe an estimated 8 percent of land area has transitioned from grazing land to woody vegetation between 1950 and 2010.

In the Eurasian Steppe, the largest grassland globally, climate change linked woody plant encroachment has been found to occur at around 1% per decade.

In the Arctic Tundra, shrub plant cover has increased by 20 percent during the past 50 years. During the same time period, shrub and tree cover increased by 30 percent in the savannas of Latin America, Africa and Australia.

== Causes ==
Woody encroachment has a long history: with the warming at the onset of the Holocene, tropical woody species expanded their ranges away from the equator into more temperate regions. However, it has occurred at unparalleled rates since the mid-19th century. As such, it is classified as a type of grassland degradation, which occurs through direct and indirect human impact during the Anthropocene.

There is evidence that some characteristics of ecosystems render them more susceptible to woody encroachment than others. For example, coarse-textured soils promote woody plant growth, while fine-textured soils limit it. Moreover, the likelihood of woody encroachment is influenced by soil moisture and soil nutrient availability, which is why it often occurs on downslope locations and cooler slopes. The causes of woody encroachment differ significantly under different climatic conditions, e.g. between wet and dry savanna.

Various factors have been found to contribute to the process of woody plant encroachment. Both local drivers (i.e. related to land use practices) as well as global drivers can cause woody plant encroachment. Due to its strong link to human induced causes, woody plant encroachment has been termed a social-ecological regime shift. Research shows that both legacy effects of specific events, as well as plant traits can contribute to encroachment. However, encroachment is not necessarily explained by a single set of conserved traits; widespread species may become encroachers where environmental and disturbance conditions allow their recruitment, survival and population increase. There is still insufficient research on the interplay between the various positive and negative feedback loops in encroaching ecosystems.

=== Land use ===
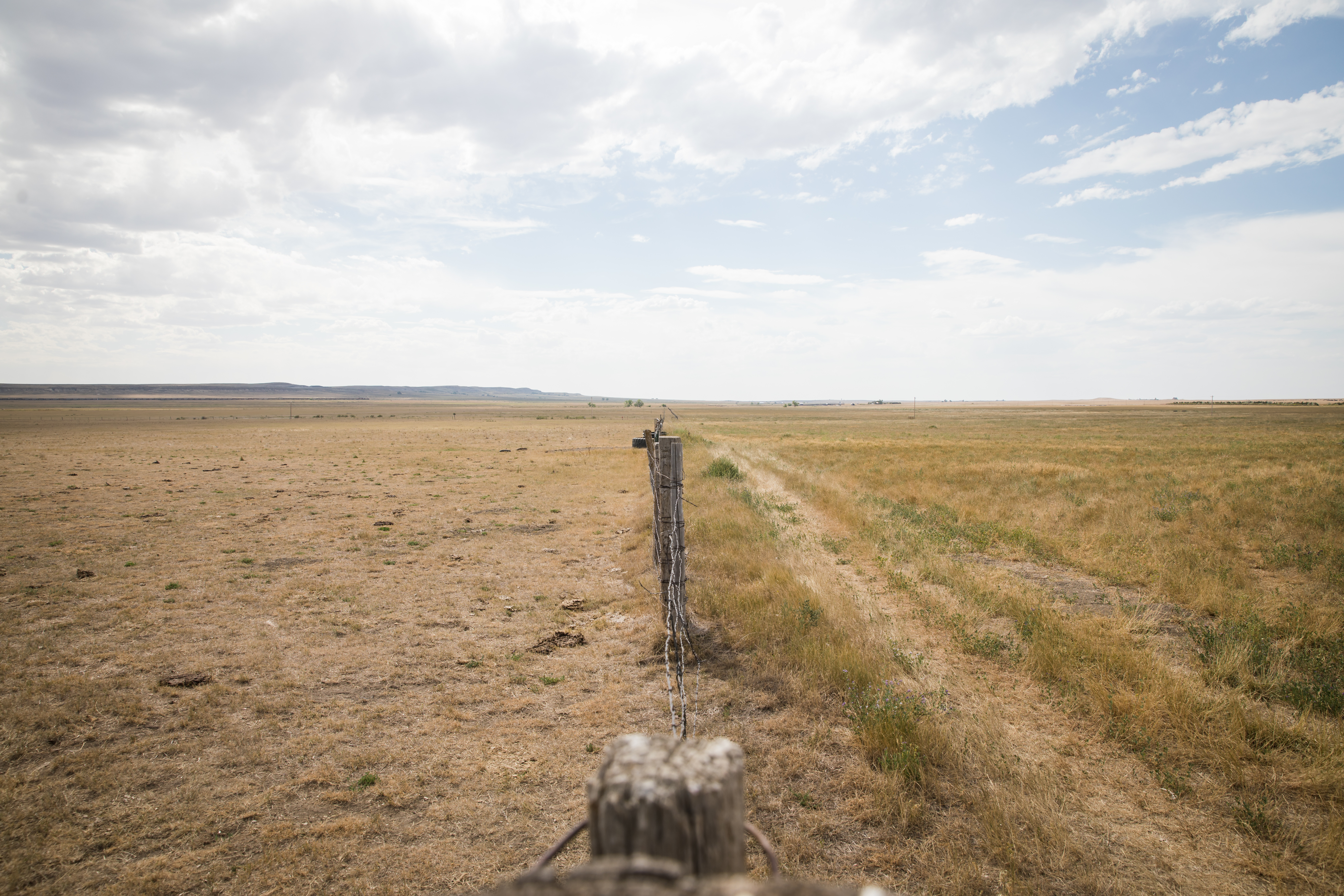
An overgrazed pasture (left) next to land that has not been grazed on.

Where land is abandoned, and respective anthropogenic pressures cease, a rapid spread of native bush plants is often observed. This is for example the case in former forest areas in the Alps that had been converted to agricultural land and later abandoned. In Southern Europe encroachment is thus linked to rural exodus. In such instances, land use intensification, e.g. increased grazing pressure, is found to be effective against woody encroachment. More recently, it is observed that land use cessation is not the only driver of woody encroachment in aforementioned regions, since the phenomenon occurs also where land continued to be used for agricultural purposes.

In other regions land use intensification is the main cause of woody plant encroachment. This is due to the interrelated fragmentation of landscapes and the loss of historical disturbance regimes, mainly in the following forms:

- Overgrazing: In the context of land intensification, a frequently cited cause of woody plant encroachment is overgrazing, commonly a result of overstocking and fencing of farms, as well as the lack of animal rotation and land resting periods. Overgrazing plays an especially strong role in mesic grasslands, where bushes can expand easily when gaining a competitive advantage over grasses, while woody encroachment is less predictable in xeric shrublands. Seed dispersal through animals is found to be a contributing factor to woody encroachment. While overgrazing has in the past frequently been found to be a main driver of woody encroachment, it is observed that woody encroachment continues in the respective areas even after grazing is reduced or ceases.
- Absence of large mammals: linked to the introduction of rangeland agriculture as well as unsustainable hunting practices, the reduction of large mammals such as elephant and rhino (in Africa) or elk (in North America) is a contributing factor to woody encroachment. A continent-wide energetics analysis found that total food energy consumption by birds and mammals across sub-Saharan Africa has declined by over one third since around 1700, including an approximately 75% decrease in the ecosystem functions performed by megafauna, reducing a key historical check on woody plant expansion. A continent-wide synthesis of historical tree-toppling rates found that elephants knock down on average 5.4% of the trees in an ecosystem per year, but that their impacts are now spatially constrained, so that most African landscapes lack this agent of tree mortality; historically, elephant tree toppling would have removed on average about one third of woody biomass production, and locally more than was produced. Landscape-scale research in Hluhluwe-iMfolozi Park, South Africa, similarly found that the poaching-driven loss of white rhinoceros (Ceratotherium simum), the world's largest grass-eating megaherbivore, was associated with changes in vegetation structure and fire regimes, with indirect implications for soil carbon dynamics.
- Fire suppression: A connected cause for woody plant encroachment is the reduction in the frequency of wildfires that would occur naturally, but are suppressed in frequency and intensity by land owners due to the associated risks and the fragmentation of landscapes. When the lack of fire reduces tree mortality and consequently the grass fuel load for fire decreases, a negative feedback loop occurs. It has been estimated that from a threshold of 40% canopy cover, surface grass fires are rare. At intermediate rainfall, fire can be the main determinant between the development of savannas and forests. In experiments in the United States it was determined that annual fires lead to the maintenance of grasslands, 4-year burn intervals lead to the establishment of shrubby habitats and 20-year burn intervals lead to severe woody plant encroachment. Moreover, the reduction of browsing by herbivores, e.g. when natural habitats are transformed into agricultural land, fosters woody plant encroachment, as bushes grow undisturbed and with increasing size also become less susceptible to fire. Already one decade of land management change, such as the exclusion of fires and overgrazing, can lead to severe woody plant encroachment. The global increase in atmospheric CO_{2} contributes to the reduction of wildfires, as it decreases flammability of grass.
- Competition for water: a positive feedback loop occurs when encroaching woody species reduce the plant available water, providing a disadvantage for grasses, promoting further woody encroachment. According to the two-layer theory, grasses use topsoil moisture, while woody plants predominantly use subsoil moisture. If grasses are reduced by overgrazing, this reduces their water intake and allows more water to penetrate into the subsoil for the use by woody plants. Moreover, research suggests that bush roots are less vulnerable to water stress than grass roots during droughts.
- Population pressure: population pressure can be the cause for woody plant encroachment, when large trees are cut as building material or fuel. This stimulates coppice growth and results in an increase of the shrub vegetation.
- Ecosystem restoration: active interventions and changes of ecosystem, such as the creation of wetlands, can trigger woody encroachment.

=== Climate change ===
While changes in land management are often seen as the main driver of woody encroachment, some studies suggest that global drivers increase woody vegetation regardless of land management practices. For example, in a representative sampling of South African grasslands, woody plant encroachment was found to be the same under different land uses and different rainfall amounts, suggesting that climate change may be the primary driver of the encroachment. Once established, shrubs suppress grass growth, perpetuating woody plant encroachment. Suitable habitat for key encroacher species is expected to increase under climate change.

Predominant global drivers include the following:

- Atmospheric CO_{2}: climate change has been found to be a cause or accelerating factor for woody plant encroachment. This is because increased atmospheric CO_{2} concentrations foster the growth of woody plants. Woody plants with C_{3} photosynthetic pathway thrive under high CO_{2} concentrations, as opposed to grasses with C_{4} photosynthetic pathway. The ability to increase nitrogen availability through N₂ fixation helps encroaching trees thrive as CO₂ levels rise. Moreover, tolerance to herbivory is found to be enhanced during the plants' recruitment stage under increased CO_{2} concentrations. Physiological acclimation to elevated CO_{2} is found to vary considerably between species: some savanna trees show clear photosynthetic upregulation under elevated CO_{2}, particularly under well-watered conditions, while others downregulate, indicating that CO_{2}-driven encroachment potential differs markedly among species.
- Rainfall patterns: a frequently cited theory is the state-and-transition model. The approach has for example been applied to describe transitions between grassy and bushy vegetation states in the Highland savanna of Namibia, driven by rainfall variability, competition and browsing pressure on Acacia mellifera seedlings. This model outlines how rainfall and its variability is the key driver of vegetation growth and its composition, bringing about woody plant encroachment under certain rainfall patterns. For example, if rainfall intensity increases, deep soil water typically increases, which in turn benefits bushes more than grasses. Both the amount of rainfall and its timing are important and distinct factors. Changes in precipitation can foster woody encroachment. Increased precipitation can foster the establishment, growth and density of woody plants. Decreased precipitation can also promote woody plant encroachment, as it fosters the shift from mesophytic grasses to xerophytic shrubs.
- Global warming: woody encroachment correlates to warming in the tundra, while it is linked to increased rainfall in the savanna. Species such as Vachellia sieberiana thrive under warming irrespective of the competition with grasses. The Intergovernmental Panel on Climate Change (IPCC) in its report "Global warming of 1.5°C" states that high-latitude tundra and boreal forests are at particular risk of climate change-induced degradation, with a high likelihood of shrub encroachment under continued warming. In other ecosystems, such as sub-Sahara grasslands, rising aridity may cause woody plants to be more prone to hydraulic failure.
- Droughts: droughts contribute to woody plant encroachment, if they reduce the perennial grass cover and the latter recovers slowly, providing shrubs with a competitive advantage with regard to the acquisition of deep-soil water. Drought, in combination with high levels of grazing pressure, can function as the tipping point for an ecosystem, causing woody encroachment.

== Ecological and socio-economic impacts ==
Woody encroachment constitutes a major global shift in plant composition, structure and function, with far-reaching impact on the affected ecosystems. The accelerating rate of woody encroachment across grasslands globally may lead to an abrupt decline of this biome type, owing to human impact. For example, the Great Plains biome is considered to be at the brink of collapse, with woody encroachment a major driver; 62% of North American grassland has been lost to date to all causes combined.

Encroachment is commonly identified as a form of land degradation, with severe negative consequences for various ecosystem services, such as biodiversity, groundwater recharge, carbon storage capacity and herbivore carrying capacity. Nevertheless, negative impact is not universal. Impacts are dependent on species, scale and environmental context factors. Woody encroachment can have significant positive impacts on ecosystem services as well. Research suggests that ecosystem multifunctionality increases under woody encroachment.

Affected ecosystem services fall into the category of provisioning (e.g. forage value), regulating (e.g. hydrological regulation, soil stability) and supporting (nutrient cycling, carbon sequestration, biodiversity, primary production). A systematic review of woody encroachment's impacts on nature's contributions to people in Africa and North America found that reductions in herbaceous forage availability were the most consistently reported material impact on both continents, while negative effects on non-material contributions such as recreation and tourism were reported mainly for Africa. There is a need for ecosystem-specific assessments and responses to woody encroachment. Generally, the following context factors determine the ecological impact of woody encroachment:

- Prevailing land use: While positive ecological effects can occur in unmanaged landscapes or certain land-uses, negative ecological effects are observed especially in landscapes used for livestock grazing.
- Density of woody plants: Plant diversity and ecosystem multifunctionality typically peak at intermediate levels of woody cover and high woody covers generally have negative impacts. The magnitude of these structural changes scales with the degree of encroachment, with impacts on ecosystem structure intensifying as shrub cover increases relative to grassland baselines.
- Environmental conditions: Arid ecosystems show more negative responses to woody encroachment than non-arid ecosystems. In arid ecosystems woody encroachment is sometimes regarded as a form of land degradation and an expression of desertification Due to its ambiguous role in these dry ecosystems, it has been termed "green desertification". Conversely, in ecosystems of the Mediterranean region and in Alpine grasslands, encroachment can enhance ecosystem functionality and reverse desertification trends. A key difference is that during woody encroachment the herbaceous cover in the inter-canopy zones can remain intact, while during desertification these zones degrade and turn into bare soil devoid of organic matter.

=== Biodiversity ===
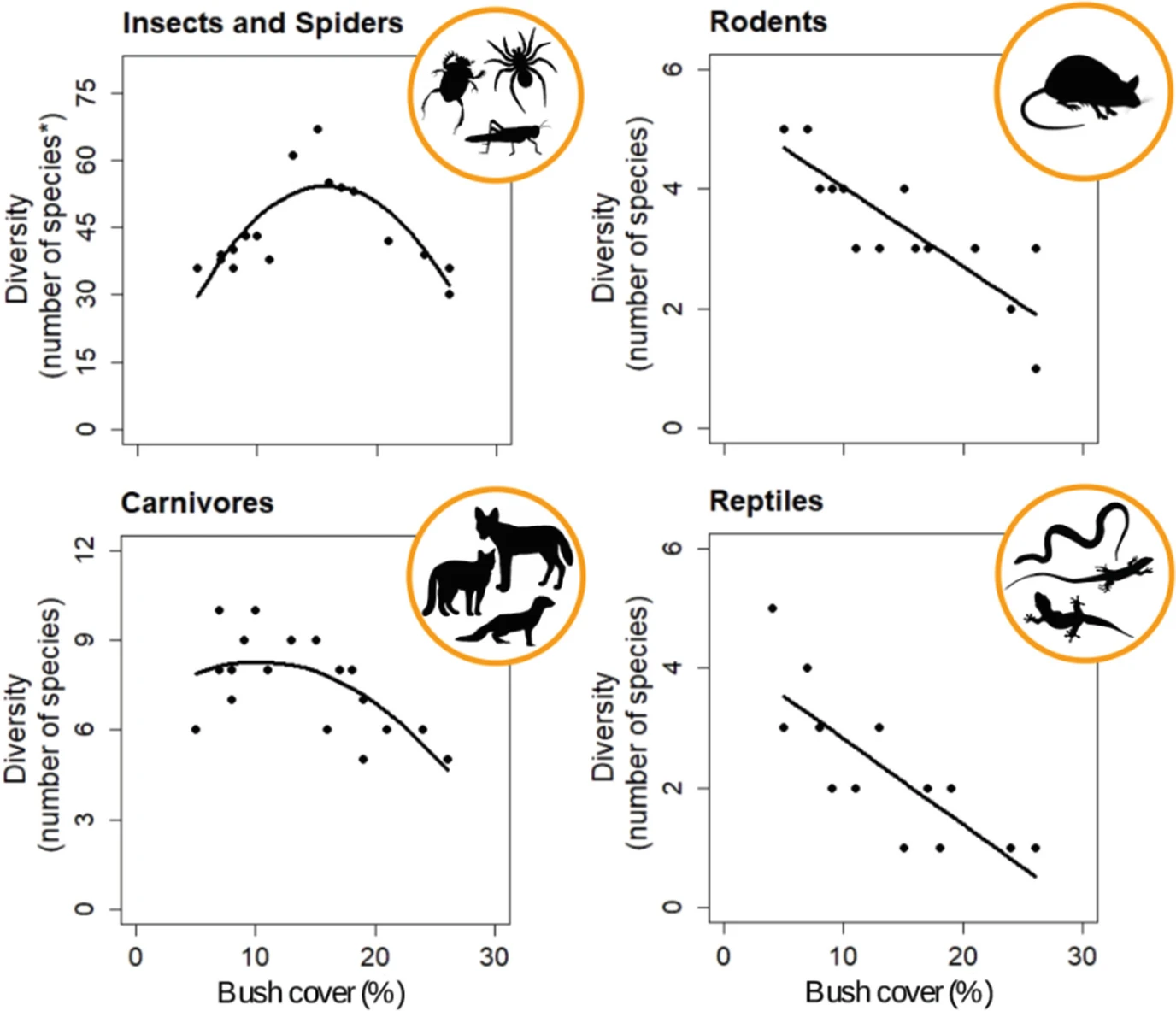
Relationship between bush cover and animal diversity in Kalahari savanna rangelands in South Africa

Woody encroachment causes widespread declines in the diversity of herbaceous vegetation through competition for water, light, and nutrients. Bush expands at the direct expense of other plant species, potentially reducing plant diversity and animal habitats.

Woody encroachment impacts animal diversity by altering the structural diversity of vegetation, which affects habitat quality and species interactions. While moderate bush cover increases diversity, excessive encroachment leads to habitat loss and reduced niches, negatively impacting species such as insects, spiders, mammals, birds, and reptiles. These changes can cascade through ecosystems, affecting herbivores and top predators, altering behaviors like hunting efficiency and foraging strategies. For example, maintaining open savannas can benefit diurnal avian scavengers (e.g. vultures), while the same ecosystem in an encroached state may favour nocturnal mammalian scavengers.

These effects are context specific, a meta-analysis of 43 publications of the time period 1978 to 2016 found that woody plant encroachment has distinct negative effects on species richness and total abundance in Africa, especially on mammals and herpetofauna, but positive effects in North America. However, in context specific analyses also in North America negative effects are observed. For example, piñon-juniper encroachment threatens up to 350 sagebrush-associated plant and animal species in the US. A study of 30 years of woody encroachment in Brazil found a significant decline of species richness by 27%.

Shrub encroachment may result in increased vertebrate species abundance and richness. However, these encroached habitats and their species assemblages may become more sensitive to droughts. As encroachment is not a stable state, but characterised by changing bush densities, it is important to identify how different density thresholds affect plant and animal species.

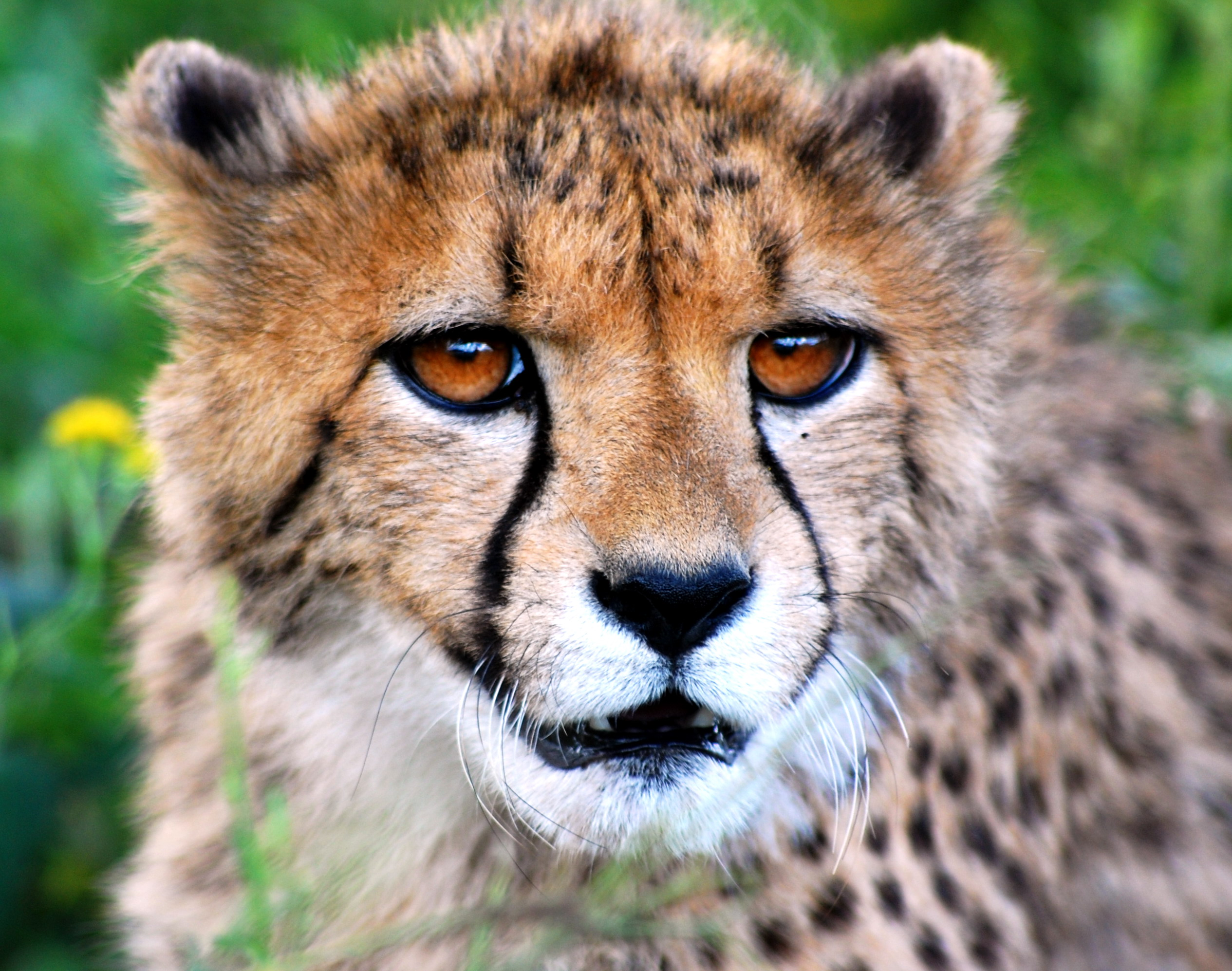
Cheetah habitat can be reduced by woody plant encroachment

Evidence of biodiversity losses includes the following:

- Grasses: encroachment results in substantial loss of herbaceous diversity, with a loss of richness that is not replaced. Research on Mediterranean grassland-shrubland mosaics similarly found that woody plant encroachment drives biotic homogenisation and species turnover in herbaceous plant communities, with the strength of these effects depending on local environmental context. Studies in South Africa have found that grass richness reduces by more than 50% under intense woody plant encroachment. In North America, a meta-analysis of 29 studies from 13 different grassland communities found that species richness declined by an average of 45% under woody plant encroachment. Rare species and those with lower stature are at risk of going extinct. Among the severely affected flora is the small white lady's slipper. Generally, large bushes are found to coexist with the herbaceous layer, while smaller shrubs compete with it. Increased shade is a contributing factor to the reduction of grass abundance and diversity.
- Mammals: woody plant encroachment has a significant impact on herbivore assemblage structure and can lead to the displacement of herbivores and other mammal types that prefer open areas. Among other factors, predation success of various mammals is negatively impacted by bush encroachment. Among the species found to lose habitat in areas affected by woody plant encroachment are cats such as cheetah, white-footed fox, as well as ungulates such as the Common tsessebe, Hirola and plains zebra. In Latin America the habitat of the almost extinct Guanaco is threatened by woody encroachment. In some rangelands, woody plant encroachment is associated with a decline in wildlife grazing capacity of up to 80%. Among rodent species, those specialists on grasslands typically decline in abundance under woody encroachment, while those specialised on forests might increase in abundance. Burrowing mammals can also lose habitat when woody encroachment occurs.
- Birds: the impact of woody encroachment on bird species must be differentiated between shrub-associated species and grassland specialists. Studies find that shrub-associated species benefit from woody encroachment up to a certain threshold of woody cover (e.g. 22 percent in a study conducted in North America), while grassland specialist populations decline. Experiments in Namibia have shown that foraging birds, such as the endangered Cape vulture, avoid encroachment levels above 2,600 woody plants per hectare. In Southern Africa, woody encroachment drives population decline of 20% of the common open ecosystem bird species, on average at a rate of 50% population decline over fifty years. In North American grasslands, bird population decline as a result of woody encroachment has been identified as a critical conservation concern. Among the birds negatively affected by woody plant encroachment are the Secretarybird, Grey go-away-bird, Marico sunbird, lesser prairie chicken, Greater sage-grouse, Archer's lark, Northern bobwhite, Kori bustard, and Yellow cardinal.
- Insects: woody plant encroachment is linked to species loss or reduction in species richness of insects with preference for open habitats. A multi-year study of arthropod communities in Namibia similarly found that shrub encroachment altered invertebrate diversity and abundance, with responses to encroachment-control interventions such as shrub thinning varying by taxon. Within the same research programme, different encroaching shrub species were found to support distinct arthropod communities—differences driven mainly by canopy-dwelling taxa—with arthropod abundance increasing with ground cover but decreasing with woody plant density. Affected species include butterfly, ant and beetle.

Encroachment often creates connected bare plant interspaces where water and wind erosion can occur.

=== Soil and vegetation structure ===
Soil quality under woody encroachment in dryland ecosystems is determined by a combination of plant cover, precipitation, soil physiochemical characteristics, and topographic variables. Encroachment has a significant impact on soil bacterial communities.

Soil quality can decline significantly in arid and semi-arid regions under woody encroachment, manifesting through reduced soil moisture levels, nutrient availability and microbial activity. This drives soil drought conditions and decreases perennial herbaceous plants, while increasing bare ground. A global meta-analysis of 117 studies encompassing 635 paired invaded-uninvaded comparisons found that, in contrast to these arid-region moisture losses, woody plant invasions were on average associated with increases in soil nitrogen (~50%), phosphorus (~34%) and organic carbon (~29%), with effects most pronounced in tropical, Mediterranean and semi-arid regions and shaped by traits such as nitrogen fixation, rooting depth and mycorrhizal association. Encroachment leads to plant communities developing tougher, nutrient-poor tissues, which makes the soil more acidic, causes organic matter to build up, and reduces phosphorus levels.

Conversely, in Mediterranean and very humid climates, woody encroachment often leads to enhanced soil quality by increasing concentrations of carbon, nitrogen and phosphorus, especially in the topsoil.

=== Groundwater recharge and soil moisture ===
Water balance

Woody plant encroachment is frequently linked to reduced groundwater recharge, based on evidence that bushes consume significantly more rainwater than grasses and encroachment alters water streamflow. Woody encroachment generally leads to root elongation in the soil and the downward movement of water is hindered by increased root density and depth. The impact on groundwater recharge differs between sandstone bedrocks and karst regions as well as between deep and shallow soils. Woody plant encroachment can accelerate soil drought through enhanced soil porosity. In the desert steppes of northern China, shrub encroachment has been found to suppress soil preferential flow by inhibiting herbaceous root growth and enriching soil mineral particles, which lowers the soil infiltration rate and increases the risk of soil aridity; natural shrubs exerted a stronger inhibitory effect than planted shrubs despite their lower cover.

While water loss is common in closed canopy woodlands (i.e. sub-humid conditions with increased evapotranspiration), in semi-arid and arid ecosystems recharge can improve under encroachment, provided there is good ecohydrological connectivity of the respective landscape. Ecohydrological connectivity is suggested as a unifying framework for the understanding of different groundwater impacts under encroachment.

Besides groundwater recharge, woody encroachment increases tree transpiration and evaporation of soil moisture, due to increased canopy cover. In arid and semi-arid environments, woody encroachment has been shown to reduce stream flows. Further, woody plant control can effectively improve the connectivity of water resources. Although this is strongly context dependent, bush control can be an effective method for the improvement of groundwater recharge.

Studies in South Africa have shown that approximately 44% of rainfall is captured by woody canopies and evaporated back into the atmosphere under woody encroachment. This effect is strongest with fine-leaved species and in events of lower rainfall sizes and intensities. It was found that up to 10% less rain enters the soil overall under woody encroachment. A meta-analysis of studies in South Africa further finds that woody encroachment has low water loss effect in areas with limited rainfall. Streamflow can increase after targeted removal of invasive and encroaching species, as showcased in South Africa.

=== Carbon sequestration ===
The impact of bush control on the carbon sequestration and storage capacity of the respective ecosystems is an important management consideration. Against the background of global efforts to mitigate climate change, the carbon sequestration and storage capacity of natural ecosystems receives increasing attention. Grasslands constitute 40% of Earth's natural vegetation and hold a considerable amount of the global Soil Organic Carbon. Shifts in plant species composition and ecosystem structure, especially through woody encroachment, lead to significant uncertainty in predicting carbon cycling in grasslands. Research on the changes to carbon sequestration under woody plant encroachment and its control is still insufficient. The Intergovernmental Panel on Climate Change (IPCC) states that woody plant encroachment generally leads to increased aboveground woody carbon, while below-ground carbon changes depend on annual rainfall and soil type. The IPCC points out that carbon stock changes under bush encroachment have been studied in Australia, Southern Africa and North America, but no global assessment has been done to date. A satellite radar assessment of tropical dry forests and savannas estimated that their aboveground woody carbon increased by 0.43 ± 0.07 petagrams of carbon (billion tonnes) per year between 2015 and 2024, about 20% of the global net land sink, with gross gains split roughly 2:1 between densification of existing woody vegetation and expansion of woody plants into previously grass-dominated areas; the assessment did not cover below-ground carbon.

Considering above-ground biomass alone, woody plant encroachment may appear to function as a carbon sink. However, when accounting for losses in the herbaceous layer and changes in soil organic carbon (SOC), the quantification of terrestrial carbon pools and associated fluxes becomes significantly more complex and highly context-dependent. Accurate assessments of changes in carbon sequestration and storage therefore require a holistic approach, considering both above-ground and below-ground carbon stocks, and must be tailored to each specific ecosystem.

Elevated atmospheric CO_{2} levels generally promote woody plant growth, which increases nutrient uptake from the soil and can in turn reduce the soil's capacity to store carbon. In contrast, grasses contribute less biomass above ground but play a significant role in below-ground carbon sequestration. Several studies have found that gains in above-ground carbon during encroachment can be entirely offset by losses in below-ground carbon.

Empirical evidence shows that while woody encroachment may lead to overall carbon increases in wetter ecosystems, it can result in carbon losses in arid environments. Some studies indicate that carbon sequestration may increase for a number of years following encroachment, but the extent of this increase is strongly influenced by annual rainfall. In dry regions with less than 400 mm of precipitation, woody encroachment appears to have minimal impact on carbon sequestration potential.

This suggests that the carbon benefits of woody plant encroachment may decline with future climate change, particularly in ecosystems projected to experience reduced rainfall and increased temperatures. Moreover, woody encroachment has been linked to increased fluvial erosion, which can lead to the release of previously stabilised organic carbon from legacy grasslands. Encroached systems are also more vulnerable than open grasslands to carbon loss during periods of drought. Among the ecosystems anticipated to lose carbon storage under advancing woody encroachment is the tundra.

Factors relevant for comparisons of carbon sequestration potentials between encroached and non-encroached grasslands include the following: above-ground net primary production (ANPP), below-ground net primary production (BNPP), photosynthesis rates, plant respiration rates, plant litter decomposition rates, soil microbacterial activity. Plant biodiversity is also an important indicator, as plant diversity contributes more to soil organic carbon than the quantity of organic matter.

Woody plant encroachment implies an increase in woody plants, in most cases at the expense of grasses. Considering that woody plants have a longer lifespan and generally also more mass, woody plant encroachment typically implies an increase in above-ground carbon storage through biosequestration. Studies however find that this is dependent on climatic conditions, with above-ground carbon pools decreasing under woody encroachment where mean annual precipitation is less than 330 mm and increasing where precipitation is higher. A contributing factor is that woody encroachment decreases above-ground plant primary production in mesic ecosystems.

Globally, the soil organic carbon pool is twice as large as the plant carbon pool, making its quantification essential. Soil organic carbon makes up two-thirds of total soil carbon. Comparisons of grasslands, shrublands and forests show that forest and shrubland hold more above-ground carbon, while grasslands boast more soil carbon. Generally, herbaceous plants allocate more biomass below-ground than woody plants. The impact of woody encroachment on soil organic carbon is found to be dependent on rainfall, with soil organic carbon increasing in dry ecosystems and decreasing in mesic ecosystems under encroachment. Degradation of grasslands has in some areas led to the loss of up to 40% of the ecosystem's soil organic carbon. An important factor is that under woody plant encroachment the increased photosynthetic potential is largely offset by increased plant respiration and respective carbon losses. Moreover, woody encroachment can decrease the water holding capacity of soils, which in turn also implies that CO_{2} runs out more quickly and isn't replaced. In tropical savanna soils, most soil organic carbon is derived from grass, not woody plants. For example, research in South Africa found that soil organic carbon from tree input matched grass-derived soil organic carbon only after 70 years of fire exclusion, challenging the view that increased tree density leads to SOC improvements. Contributing factors vary broadly in different settings, as is also evident in the role of litter. Generally, organic carbon in the topsoil can benefit from increased litter under encroachment. However, in South Africa woody plant encroachment was found to slow decomposition rates of litter, which took twice the time to decay under woody plant encroachment compared to open savannas.

Soil organic carbon changes need to be viewed at the landscape level, as there are differences between under canopy and inter canopy processes. When a landscape becomes increasingly encroached and the remaining open grassland patches are overgrazed as a result, soil organic carbon may decrease. In pastoral lands of Ethiopia, woody plant encroachment was found to have little to no positive effect on soil organic carbon and woody encroachment restriction was the most effective way to maintain soil organic carbon. In the United States, substantial soil organic carbon sequestration was observed in deeper portions of the soil, following woody encroachment.

An important factor is that rooting depth increases with woody encroachment, on average by 38 cm and up to 65 cm. Deeper rooting may promote the accumulation of organic carbon in the deep soil layers, but at the same time also lead to a positive priming effect, i.e. the stimulation of microbial activity and decomposition of organic matter. The trajectory of deep soil carbon under woody encroachment will depend on the balance of increased SOC accumulation and priming losses. A meta-analysis of 142 studies found that shrub encroachment alters soil organic carbon (0–50 cm), with changes ranging between -50 and 300 percent. Soil organic carbon increased under the following conditions: semi-arid and humid regions, encroachment by leguminous shrubs as opposed to non-legumes, sandy soils as opposed to clay soils. The study further concludes that shrub encroachment has a mainly positive effect on top-soil organic carbon content, with significant variations among climate, soil and shrub types. There is a lack of standardised methodologies to assess the effect of woody encroachment on soil organic carbon.

=== Land productivity and rural livelihoods ===
Woody plant encroachment directly impacts land productivity, as widely documented in the context of animal carrying capacity. In the western United States, 25% of rangelands experience sustained tree cover expansion, with estimated losses for agricultural producers of $5 billion since 1990. The forage lost annually is estimated to be equal to the consumption of 1.5 million bison or 1.9 million cattle. In North America, each 1 percent increase in woody cover implies a reduction of 0.6 to 1.6 cattle per 100 hectares. In the Southern African country Namibia it is assumed that agricultural carrying capacity of rangelands has declined by two-thirds due to woody plant encroachment. In East Africa there is evidence that an increase of bush cover of 10 percent reduced grazing by 7 percent, with land becoming unusable as rangeland when the bush cover reaches 90 percent. The relationship between shrub cover and productivity is not necessarily linear. A study across 102 sites along a shrub-cover gradient found that grassland productivity responded non-linearly to encroachment, declining sharply between 0% and 3% shrub cover (grass-dominant stage), stabilising between roughly 3% and 25% cover (grass–shrub transitional stage), and declining substantially again beyond 25% cover (shrub-dominant stage).

Woody encroachment is often considered to have a negative impact on rural livelihoods. In Africa, 21% of the population depend on rangeland resources. Woody encroachment typically leads to an increase in less palatable woody species at the expense of palatable grasses. This reduces the resources available to pastoral communities and rangeland based agriculture at large. Woody encroachment has negative consequences on livelihoods, especially in arid areas, which support a third of the world population's livelihoods. Woody plant encroachment is expected to lead to large scale biome changes in Africa and experts argue that climate change adaptation strategies need to be flexible to adjust to this process. In South Africa, the shrub Seriphium plumosum is commonly referred to as "bankrupt bush" due to its association with farm productivity reductions of up to 80%. Studies suggest a link between woody plant encroachment and outmigration from rural areas.

Touristic potential of land is found to decline in areas with heavy woody plant encroachment, with visitors shifting to less encroached areas and better visibility of wildlife.

=== Human health and climate feedbacks ===
In the United States, woody encroachment has been linked to the spread of tick-borne pathogens and respective disease risk for humans and animals. In the Arctic tundra, shrub encroachment can reduce cloudiness and contribute to a raise in temperature. In North America, significant increases in temperature and rainfall were linked to woody encroachment, amounting to values up to 214 mm and 0.68 °C respectively. This is caused by a decrease in surface albedo.

Targeted bush control in combination with the protection of larger trees is found to improve scavenging that regulates disease processes, alters species distributions, and influences nutrient cycling.

== Quantification and monitoring ==
There is no static definition of what is considered woody encroachment, especially when encroachment of indigenous plants occurs. While it is simple to determine vegetation trends, e.g. an increase in woody plants over time, it is more complex to determine thresholds beyond which an area is to be considered as encroached. Various definitions as well as quantification and mapping methods have been developed.

Data collection can typically involve mapping and morphological characterisation of trees and shrubs, phytosociological survey of permanent plots, grid-point intercept survey of permanent plots, line-intercept surveys along transects as well as allometric shrub measurements along transects. In Southern Africa, the BECVOL method (Biomass Estimates from Canopy Volume) finds frequent application. It determines Evapotranspiration Tree Equivalents (ETTE) per selected area. This data is used for comparison against climatic factors, especially annual rainfall, to determine whether the respective area has a higher number of woody plants than is considered sustainable.

Remote sensing imagery is increasingly used to determine the extent of woody encroachment. Reviews of remote-sensing approaches highlight a wide range of sensors and methods applied to quantify woody plant encroachment over time, while noting persistent challenges in distinguishing encroachment from other land-cover change. New spectral indices, such as one combining optical and radar features to separate shrub cover from co-occurring herbaceous vegetation in typical steppe grasslands, have also been developed to improve the accuracy of shrub cover estimation. Limitations of this methodology include difficulties in distinguishing species and the inability to detect small shrubs. Moreover, UAV (drone) based multispectral data and Lidar data are frequently used to quantify woody encroachment. The combination of colour-infrared aerial imagery and support-vector machines classification can lead to high accuracy in identifying shrubs. The probability of woody plant encroachment for the African continent has been mapped using GIS data and the variables precipitation, soil moisture and cattle density. An exclusive reliance on remote sensing data bears the risk of wrongly interpreting woody plant encroachment, e.g. as beneficial vegetation greening. Hyperspectral vegetation indices (HVIs) can be developed to accurately separate shrub cover from green vegetation. For the Canadian Prairies, a multi-scale monitoring framework has been developed that combines Sentinel-2 time series to separate native from tame grassland, field hyperspectral data to characterise the spectral signatures of shrubs, high-resolution UAV imagery with Transformer-based deep learning to detect individual woody plants by species at early encroachment stages, and Sentinel-1 and Sentinel-2 data with stacking ensemble models to map fractional shrub and tree cover; the tree cover models could be transferred between sites, whereas shrub cover models required site-specific recalibration. Google Earth images have been successfully used to analyse woody encroachment in South Africa. In Namibia, the so-called Bush Information System is based on synthetic-aperture radar satellite data. Satellite remote sensing is used to determine the effect of targeted plant removal in encroached areas.

A number of spatially explicit models for the assessment of woody encroachment have been developed.

Increasingly, machine-learning techniques and applications based on artificial intelligence are used to investigate woody plant encroachment. In addition to using satellite imagery, also the computer aided analysis of visual images taken from a driving vehicle has been trialed. A comparison of k-nearest neighbour, random forest and support vector machine algorithms applied to Landsat imagery from 1988 to 2023 in Mokala National Park, South Africa, found machine-learning classification to provide a reliable baseline for monitoring bush encroachment and rangeland degradation in protected semi-arid areas. In the Edwards Plateau of Texas, a random forest model combining ICESat-2 canopy height data with multispectral imagery and environmental predictors has been used to map aboveground woody biomass at 30 m resolution, using training data derived from post-fire vegetation productivity rather than field measurements; when evaluated against forest inventory plots, the estimates were more accurate than the GEDI biomass products, although the authors caution that such maps should not be used directly for carbon accounting without further validation.

Rephotography is found to be an effective tool for the monitoring of vegetation change, including woody encroachment and forms the basis of various encroachment assessments.

Methods to overcome the limited availability of photographic evidence or written records include the assessment of pollen records. In a recent application, vegetation cover of the past 130 years in a woody plant encroachment area in Namibia was established.

Vegetation mapping tools developed for the use by individual land users and support organisations include the American Rangeland Analysis Platform, and the Namibian Biomass Quantification Tool.

== Restoration ==
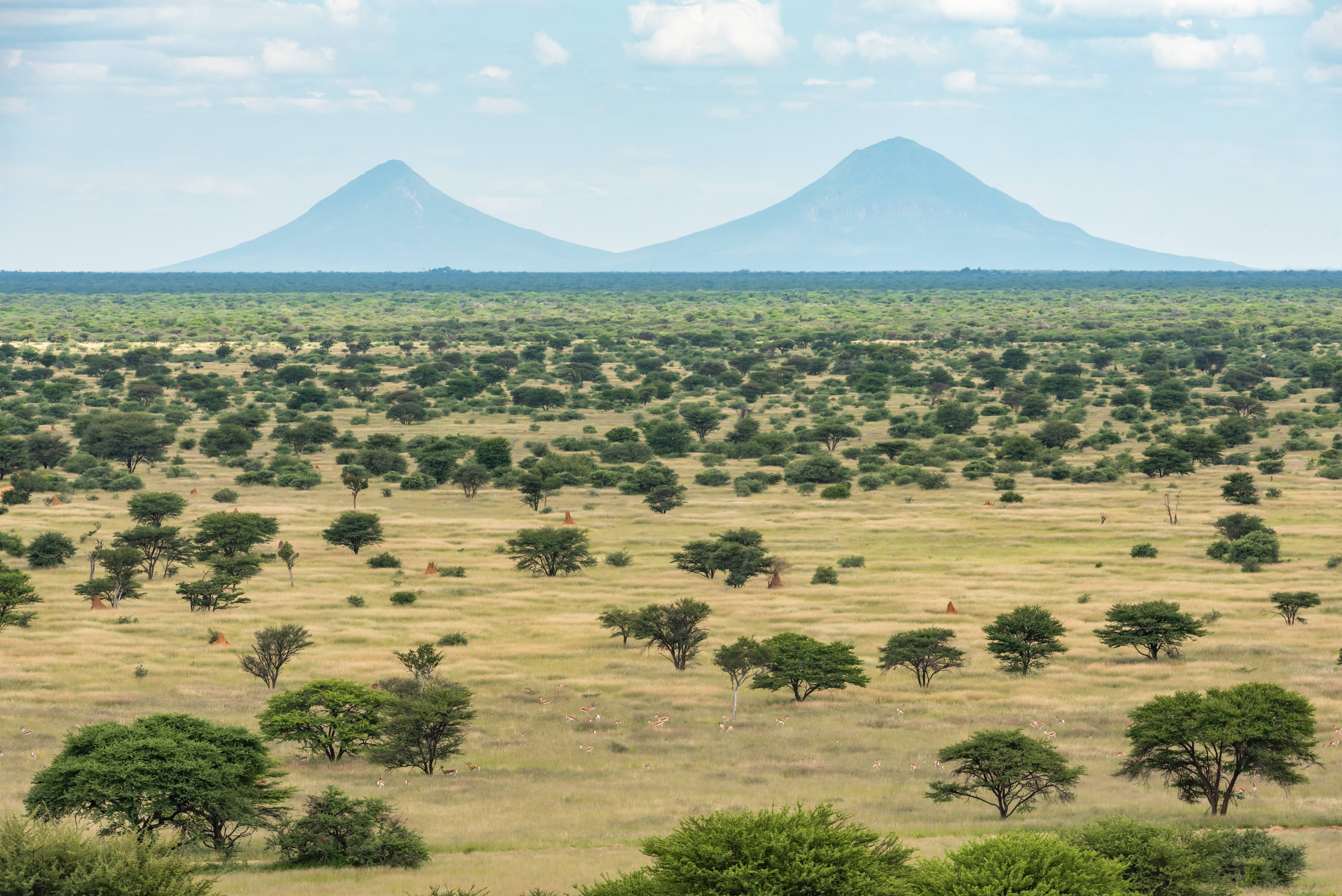
Landscape in Namibia with land after selective bush thinning (foreground) and severe bush encroachment (background)

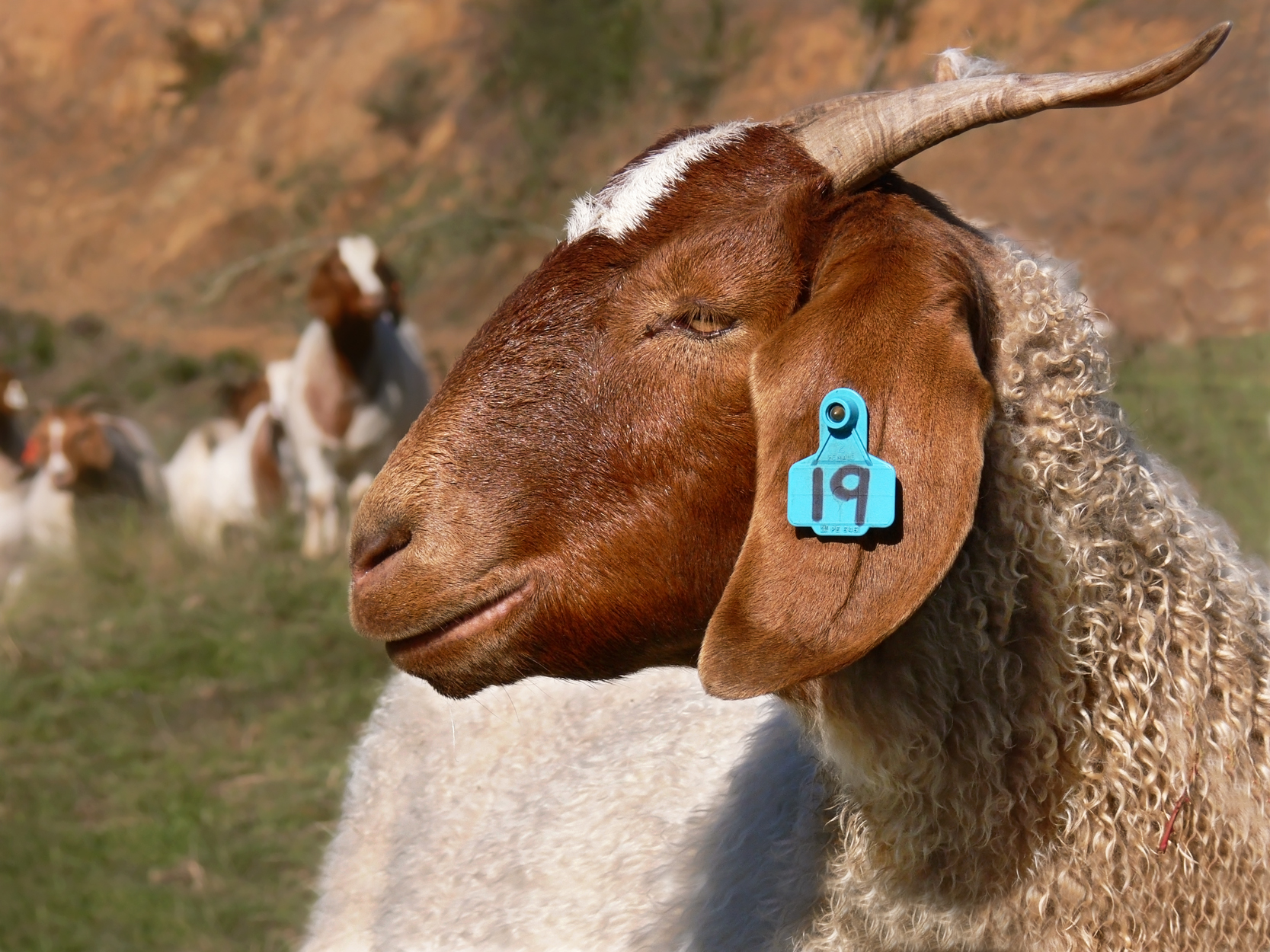
Goats can function as a natural measure against woody plant encroachment or the re-establishment of seedlings after bush thinning.

Brush control is the active management of the density of woody species in grasslands. Although woody encroachment in many instances is a direct consequence of unsustainable management practices, it is unlikely that the introduction of more sustainable practices alone (e.g. the management of fire and grazing regimes) will be enough to restore already degraded areas. Encroached grasslands can constitute a stable state, meaning that without intervention the vegetation will not return to its previous composition.

For decisions on appropriate control measures, it is essential that both local and global drivers of woody encroachment, as well as their interaction, are understood. Restoration must be approached as a set of interventions that iteratively move a degraded ecosystem to a new system state. Responsive measures, such as mechanical removal, are needed to restore a different balance between woody and herbaceous plants. Once a high woody plant density is established, woody plants contribute to the soil seed bank more than grasses and the lack of grasses presents less fuel for fires, reducing their intensity. This perpetuates woody encroachment and necessitates intervention, if the encroached state is undesirable for the functions and use of the respective ecosystems.

Most interventions constitute a selective thinning of bush densities, although in some contexts also repeat clear-cutting has been shown to effectively restore diversity of typical savanna species. In decision making on which woody species to thin out and which to retain, structural and functional traits of the species play a key role. Research in Namibia has shown that the intensity of thinning is critical: complete shrub removal reduced overall arthropod abundance by up to 30%, while moderate manual thinning maintained diversity comparable to untreated controls, supporting mosaic debushing strategies that preserve habitat heterogeneity. Bush control measures must go hand in hand with grazing management, as both are crucial factors influencing the future state of the respective ecosystems. State and Transition Models have been developed to provide management support to land users, capturing ecosystem complexities beyond succession, but their applicability is still limited. Since rehabilitation may only be achieved in the long term, it should be combined with adaptive management. More broadly, it has been argued that management goals should not be framed as a binary choice between fully encroached and pristine grassland: under shifting climate and disturbance baselines, historic restoration targets may become unattainable, and deliberately maintaining managed mosaics of grassland and woody cover can retain valued ecosystem services.

The restoration of degraded grasslands can bring about a wide range of ecosystem service improvements. In doing so, it can also strengthen the drought resilience of affected ecosystems. Bush control can lead to biodiversity improvements regardless of the predominant land use.

=== Control measures ===
The term bush control, or brush management, refers to actions that are targeted at controlling the density and composition of bushes and shrubs in a given area. Such measures either serve to reduce risks associated with woody plant encroachment, such as wildfires, or to rehabilitate the affected ecosystems. It is widely accepted that encroaching indigenous woody plants are to be reduced in numbers, but not eradicated. This is critical as these plants provide important functions in the respective ecosystems, e.g. they serve as habitat for animals. Efforts to counter woody plant encroachment fall into the scientific field of restoration ecology and are primarily guided by ecological parameters, followed by economic indicators.

Three different categories of control measures can be distinguished:

- Preventive measures: application of proven good management practices to prevent the excessive growth of woody species, e.g. through appropriate stocking rates and rotational grazing in the case of rangeland agriculture. It is generally assumed that preventative measures are a more cost-effective method to combat woody encroachment than treating ecosystems once degradation has occurred. Certain land uses and animal species can aid in preventing woody plant encroachment, for example elephants. Research on degradation tipping points suggests soil organic carbon and carbon isotopes as early-warning indicators in potentially encroached areas. Evidence from a shrub-cover gradient likewise suggests that bush control is most effective when initiated at the early stages of encroachment (around 3% shrub cover), the stage at which trade-offs among ecosystem functions are strongest and below-ground species richness still sustains grassland productivity.
- Responsive measures: the reduction of bush densities through targeted bush harvesting or other forms of removal (bush thinning).
- Maintenance measures: repeated or continuous measures of maintaining the bush density and composition that has been established through bush thinning.

There is an increasing focus on the carbon sequestration impact, which differs among control measures. The application of chemicals, for example, can lead to higher carbon losses than mechanical shrub thinning.

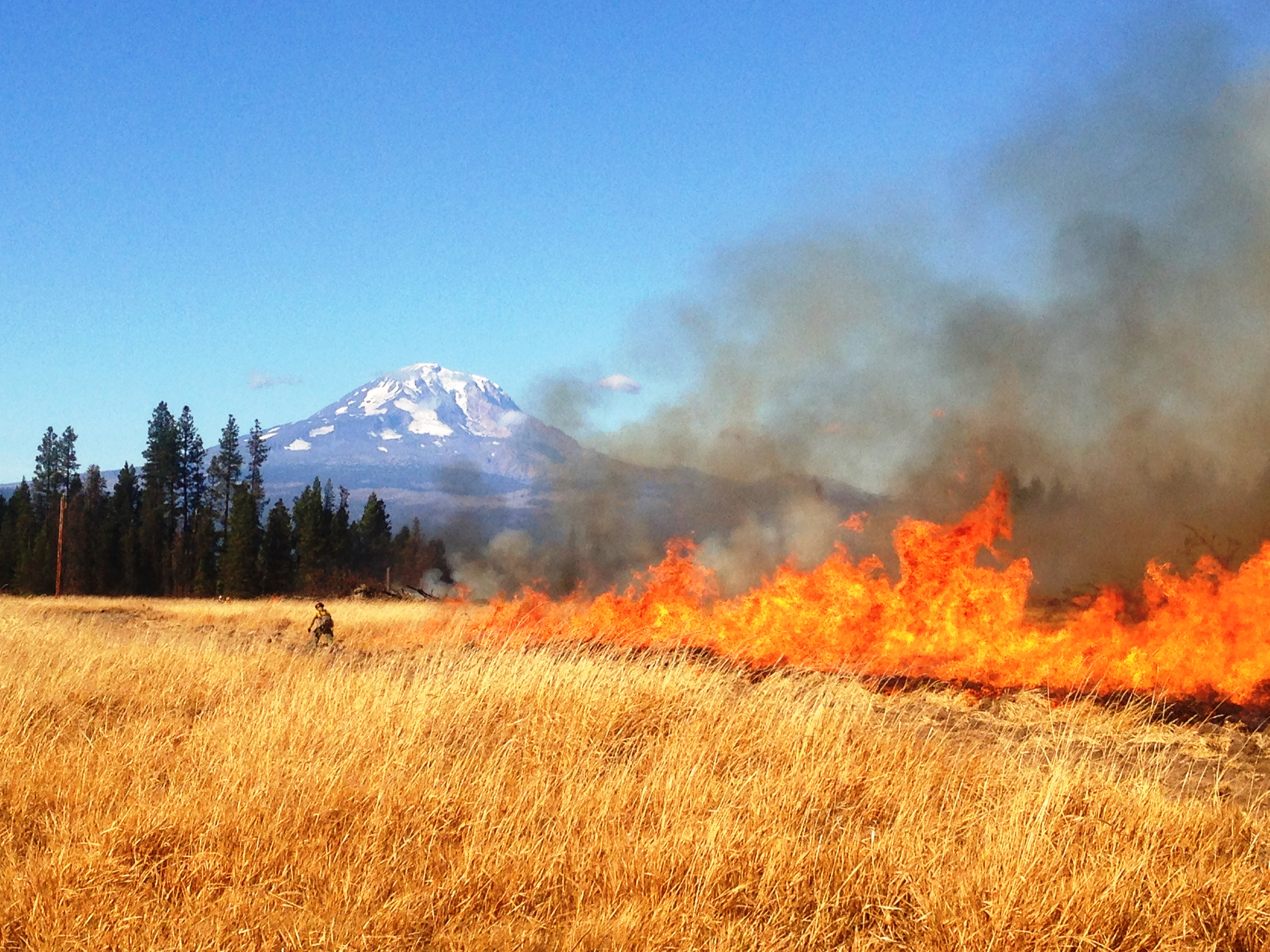
Fire fighter administering prescribed fire as management tool to remove woody encroachment near Mt. Adams, Washington, US

==== Natural bush control ====
Controlled fires are a commonly applied method of bush control. The relation between prescribed fire and tree mortality is the subject of ongoing research. The success rate of prescribed fires differs depending on the season during which it is applied. In some cases, fire treatment slows down woody encroachment, but is unsuccessful in reversing it. Even high-intensity fires that top-kill most shrubs may fail to reverse encroachment where resprouting shrubs dominate.

Optimal fire management may vary depending on vegetation community, land use as well as frequency and timing of fires. Controlled fires are not only a tool to manage biodiversity, but can also be used to reduce greenhouse gas (GHG) emissions by shifting fire seasonality and reducing fire intensity. Fire was found to be especially effective in reducing bush densities, when coupled with the natural event of droughts. The combination of fire and browsing, termed pyric herbivory, has also been shown to have positive restoration effects. Cattle can in part substitute for large herbivores. Pyric herbivory has been applied to restore shrub-encroached grasslands in the Great Plains and in Mediterranean Europe.

Moreover, fires have the advantage that they consume the seeds of woody plants in the grass layer before germination, therefore reducing the grassland's sensitivity to encroachment.

Prerequisite for successful bush control through fire is sufficient fuel load, thus fires have a higher effectiveness in areas where sufficient grass is available. Furthermore, fires must be administered regularly to address re-growth. Bush control through fire is found to be more effective when applying a range of fire intensities over time. Fire primarily affects shrubs at early growth stages, causing less damage to plants of larger height and crown diameter. Fuel load, and thus the efficacy of fires for bush control, can be reduced due to the presence of herbivores.

Long-term research in the South African savanna found that high-intensity fire did reduce encroachment in the short-term, but not in the mid-term. In a cross-continental collaboration between South Africa and the US, a synthesis on the experience with fire as a bush control method was published.

Rewilding ecosystems with historic herbivores can further contribute to bush control. The presence of herbivores contributes to woody suppression, especially at the early demographic stages.

Variable livestock grazing can be used to reduce woody encroachment as well as re-growth after bush thinning. A well-documented approach is the introduction of larger herds of goats that feed on the woody plants and thereby limit their growth.

There is evidence that some rural farming communities have used small ruminants, like goats, to prevent woody plant encroachment for decades. Further, intensive rotational grazing, with resting periods for pasture recovery, can be a tool to limit woody encroachment. Overall, the role of targeted grazing systems as biodiversity conservation tool is subject of ongoing research.

==== Chemical bush control ====
Woody plant densities are frequently controlled through the application of herbicides, in particular arboricides. Commonly applied herbicides are based on the active ingredients tebuthiuron, ethidimuron, bromacil and picloram. In East Africa, first comprehensive experiments on the effectiveness of such bush control date back to 1958–1960. There is however evidence that applied chemicals can have negative long-term effects and effectively prevent the recruitment of desired grasses and other plants. The application of non-species-specific herbicides is found to result in lower species richness than the application of species-specific herbicides. Further, arboricide application can negatively affect insect populations and arthropods, which in turn is a threat for bird populations. Scientific trials in South Africa showed that the application of herbicides has the highest success rate when coupled with mechanical bush thinning.

==== Mechanical bush control ====
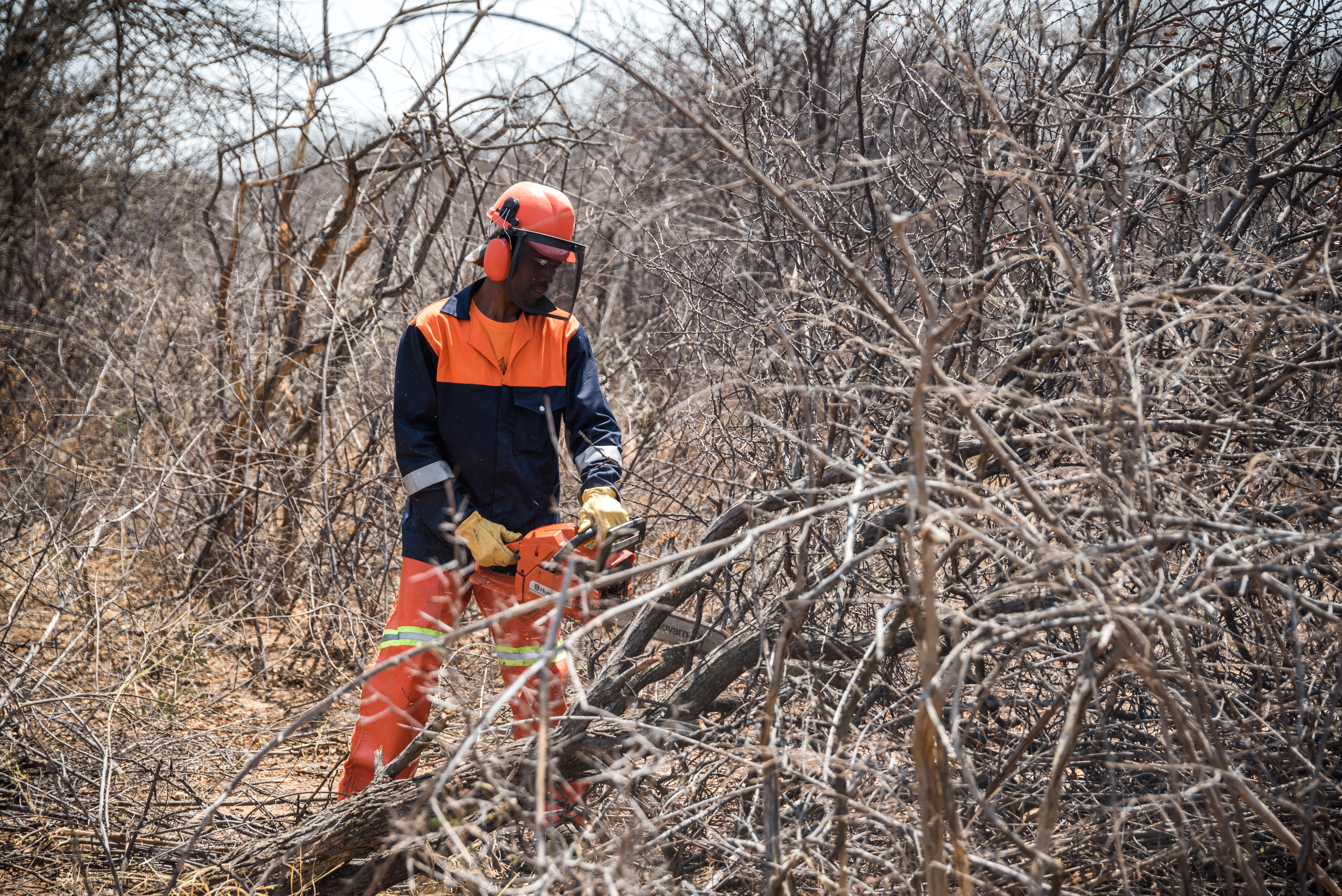
Bush thinning in Namibia

Cutting or harvesting of bushes and shrubs with manual or mechanised equipment. Mechanical cutting of woody plants is followed by stem-burning, fire or browsing to suppress re-growth. Some studies find that mechanical bush control is more sustainable than controlled fires, because burning leads to deeper soil degradation and faster recovery of shrubs. Bush that is mechanically harvested is often burnt on piles, but can also serve as feedstock for value addition, including firewood, charcoal, animal feed, energy and construction material. Mechanical cutting is found to be effective, but requires repeat application. When woody branches are left to cover the degraded soil, this method is called brush packing. Some forms of mechanical woody plant removal involve uprooting, which tends to lead to better results in terms of the restoration of the grass layer, but can have disadvantages for chemical and microbiological soil properties.

=== Economics ===
As woody encroachment is often widespread and most rehabilitation efforts costly, funding is a key constraint. In the case of mechanical woody plant thinning, i.e. the selective harvesting, the income from downstream value chains can fund the restoration activities.

An example of highly commercialised encroacher biomass use is charcoal production in Namibia. Encroacher bush biomass has also been trialled as a growth substrate for cultivating Ganoderma mushrooms in Namibia's Otjozondjupa region, offering a further potential value-addition pathway for encroacher species such as Senegalia mellifera and Terminalia sericea. There are also efforts to use encroaching woody species as a source of alternative animal fodder, which involves either making use of the leaf material of encroaching species, or milling the entire plant. A seasonal feed-evaluation study of the predominant Namibian encroacher species (Senegalia mellifera, Dichrostachys cinerea, Terminalia sericea and Rhigozum trichotomum) found their leaves and twigs to have low organic matter digestibility and high indigestible fibre content, and to produce more methane per unit of dry matter in the late dry season than in the early rainy season, indicating that such browse requires further processing to improve its feeding value. In the form of woody chips, encroaching species are used for thermal energy applications, such as various industrial processes.

In both Namibia and South Africa, invasive and encroaching plant species have been explored as a possible feedstock for synthetic fuels, such as sustainable aviation fuel and sustainable marine fuels.

Payment for Ecosystem Services, and specifically carbon credits, are also increasingly explored as a funding mechanism for the control of woody encroachment. Savanna fire management is found to have potential to generate carbon revenue, with which rangeland restoration in Africa can be funded. A critical review of leading carbon-crediting protocols for avoided grassland and shrubland conversion identified methodological flaws, including inadequate field-data guidance and the exclusion of grazing from baseline scenarios, that limit the reliability of such protocols in accounting for carbon fluxes relevant to woody encroachment.

=== Challenges ===
Grassland restoration has generally received less attention than forest restoration during recent decades. This is partially explained by widespread opinions, such as grasslands being biodiversity-poor and providing few ecosystem services or that grasslands are a transitional biome.

Literature emphasises that a restoration of woody plant encroachment areas to a desired previous non-encroached state is difficult to achieve and the recovery of key ecosystem services may be short-lived or not occur. Intervention methods and technologies must be context-specific to achieve their intended outcome. No single grass-bush ratio will maximise all ecosystem services.

Current efforts of selective plant removal are found to have slowed or halted woody encroachment in respective areas, but are sometimes found to be outpaced by continuing encroachment. A meta-analysis of 524 studies on ecosystem responses to both encroachment and the removal of woody plants finds that most efforts to restore the respective ecosystems fail, while the success rate predominantly depends on encroachment stage and plant traits. It was further found that different control methods have different effects on specific ecosystem services. For example, mechanical removal of woody plants can enhance forage value, while reducing hydrological regulation. In contrast, chemical removal can enhance hydrological regulations at the expense of plant diversity. This implies that there are trade-offs to be considered for each set of control measures.

When bush thinning is implemented in isolation, without follow-up measures, grassland may not be rehabilitated. This is because such once-off treatments typically target small areas at a time and they leave plant seeds behind enabling rapid re-establishment of bushes. A combination of preventative measures, addressing the causes of woody plant encroachment, and responsive measures, rehabilitating affected ecosystems, can overcome woody plant encroachment in the long-run. The need for follow-up treatment and maintenance of the land may increase over time to preserve restored land.

In grassland conservation efforts, the implementation of measures across networks of private lands, instead of individual farms, remains a key challenge. Due to the high cost of chemical or mechanical removal of woody species, such interventions are often implemented on a small scale, i.e. a few hectares at a time. This differs from natural control processes before human land use, e.g. widespread fires and vegetation pressure by free roaming wildlife. As a result, the interventions often have limited impact on the continued dispersal and spread of woody plants. For this reason, a key strategy developed in North America is termed "defending the core". It involves the systematic expansion of healthy areas of grasslands to the outside, i.e. thinning of bush stands at the perimeter.

Countering woody encroachment can be costly and largely depends on the financial capacity of land users. Linking bush control to the concept of Payment for ecosystem services (PES) has been explored in some countries.

The perceptions and priorities of land users, in terms of ecosystem services to be restored, are often not sufficiently known or taken into consideration when undertaking or promoting restoration measures.

Managing the woody cover alone does not guarantee productive ecosystems, as also the cover and diversity of desired grass species must form part of the management considerations.

Existing subsidy regimes can lead to encroachment as an unintended consequence.

== Relation to climate change mitigation and adaptation ==
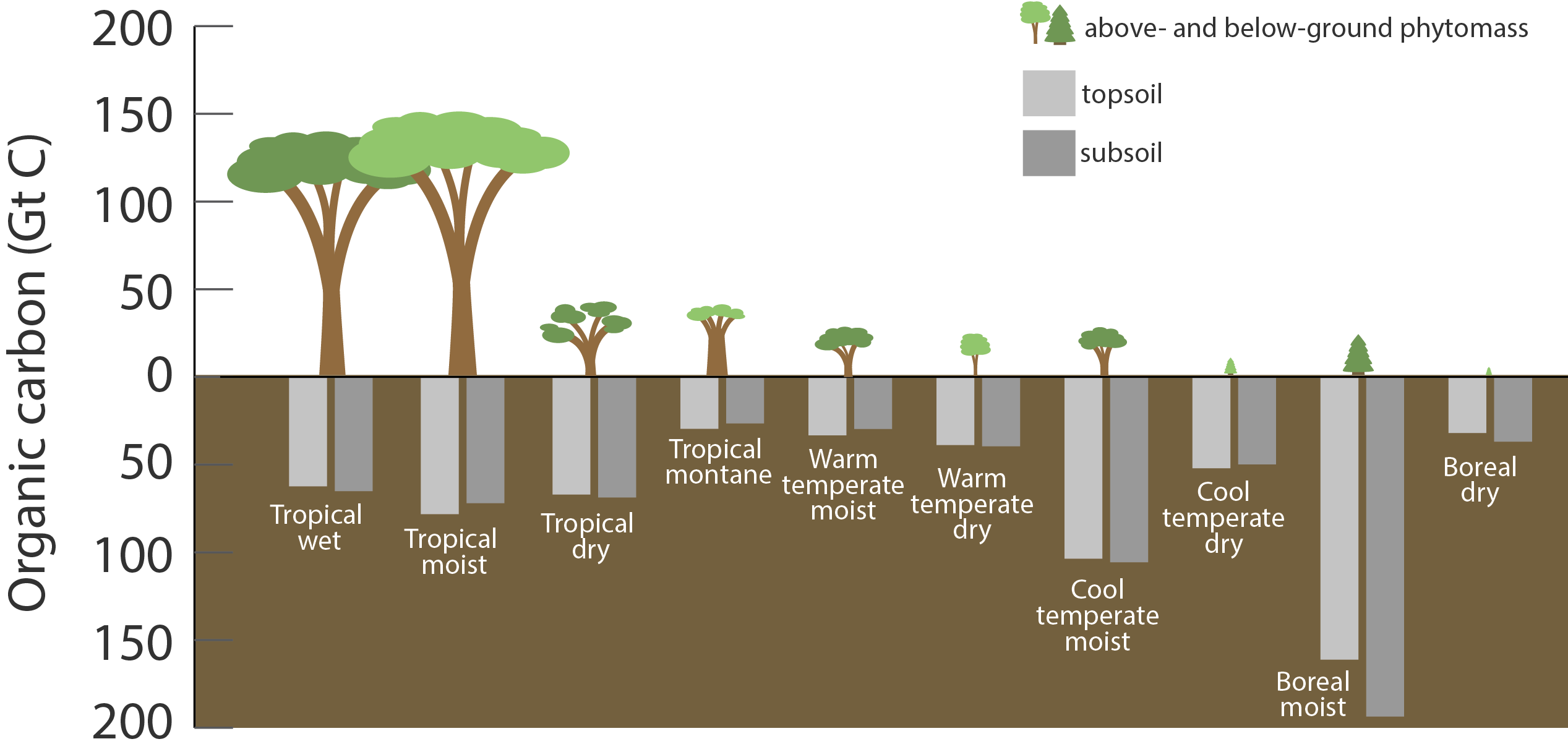
Amount of carbon stored in Earth's various terrestrial ecosystems, in gigatonnes

=== National carbon accounting and related trade-offs ===
Grassland conservation can make a significant contribution to global carbon sequestration targets, but compared to sequestration potential in forestry and agriculture, this is still insufficiently explored and implemented. Detailed accounting for the effect of woody encroachment on global carbon pools and fluxes is unclear. Given scientific uncertainties, it varies widely how countries factor woody encroachment and the control thereof into their national Greenhouse Gas Inventories.

In early carbon sink quantifications, woody encroachment was found to account for as much as 22% to 40% of the regional carbon sink in the USA. In the US, woody encroachment is however seen as a key uncertainty in the US carbon balance. The sink capacity is found to decrease when encroachment has reached its maximum extent. In Australia too, woody encroachment constitutes a high proportion of the national carbon account. Australia's carbon plan is however criticised for ignoring the carbon potential of the soil, which in drylands is found to be seven to one hundred times larger than that of vegetation. In South Africa, woody encroachment was estimated to have added around 21,000 Gg CO_{2} to the national carbon sink, while it has been highlighted that especially the loss of grass roots leads to losses of below-ground carbon, which is not fully compensated by gains of above-ground carbon.

Several trade-offs must be considered in land management decisions, such as a possible carbon-biodiversity trade-off. It can have severe negative consequences if woody encroachment or the invasion of alien woody species is accepted and seen as a way to increase ecosystem CO_{2} sink capacities. In its 2022 Sixth Assessment Report, the Intergovernmental Panel on Climate Change (IPCC) identifies woody encroachment as a contribution to land degradation, through the loss of open ecosystems and their services. The report further stipulates that while there may be slight increases in carbon, woody encroachment at the same time masks negative impacts on biodiversity and water cycles and, consequently, livelihoods. Carbon-focused land management policies that reward carbon accumulation without distinguishing between forest recovery and the conversion of fire-adapted grasslands have been found to promote ecologically damaging land-cover transitions.

Carbon-focused restoration approaches remain vital and can be balanced with the need to enhance other ecosystem services through spatially mixed management strategies, leaving encroached patches and in thinned areas.

=== Conflicting climate change mitigation measures ===
Woody encroachment can be exacerbated when affected ecosystems become the target of misguided afforestation. It is found that grasslands are frequently misidentified as degraded forests and targeted by afforestation efforts. According to an analysis of areas identified to have forest restoration potential by the World Resources Institute, this includes up to 900 million hectares of grasslands. In Africa alone, 100 million hectares of grasslands are found to be at risk by misdirected afforestation efforts. Among the areas mapped as degraded forests are the Serengeti and Kruger National Parks, which have not been forested for several million years. Over half of all tree-planting projects in Africa are implemented in savannah grasslands.

Research in Southern Africa suggests that tree planting in such ecosystems does not lead to increased soil organic carbon, as the latter is predominantly grass-derived. The Intergovernmental Panel on Climate Change (IPCC) also states that mitigation action, such as reforestation or afforestation, can encroach on land needed for agricultural adaptation and thereby threaten food security, livelihoods and ecosystem functions.

=== Encroachment control as adaptation measure ===
Some countries, for example South Africa, acknowledge inconclusive evidence on the emissions effect of bush thinning, but strongly promote it as a means of climate change adaptation. Geographic selection of intervention areas, targeting areas that are at an early stage of encroachment, can minimise above-ground carbon losses and thus minimise the possible trade-off between mitigation and adaptation. The Intergovernmental Panel on Climate Change (IPCC) reflects on this trade-off: "This variable relationship between the level of encroachment, carbon stocks, biodiversity, provision of water and pastoral value can present a conundrum to policymakers, especially when considering the goals of three Rio Conventions: UNFCCC, UNCCD and UNCBD. Clearing intense woody plant encroachment may improve species diversity, rangeland productivity, the provision of water and decrease desertification, thereby contributing to the goals of the UNCBD and UNCCD as well as the adaptation aims of the UNFCCC. However, it would lead to the release of biomass carbon stocks into the atmosphere and potentially conflict with the mitigation aims of the UNFCCC." The IPCC further lists bush control as a relevant measure under ecosystem-based adaptation and community-based adaptation. A modelling study for the Ganale Dawa River Basin in Ethiopia, combining remote sensing data, CMIP6 climate projections and a random forest model, found that bush clearing reduced agricultural and hydrological drought severity under both historical and projected climate conditions to 2100, with intensive clearing reducing agricultural drought severity by up to 26% and hydrological drought severity by up to 8%, whereas unmanaged bush encroachment increased drought severity.

== See also ==
- Convention on Biological Diversity
- Effects of climate change on plant biodiversity
- Environmental restoration
- Farmer-managed natural regeneration
- Grassland degradation
- Land rehabilitation
- Land restoration
- Rangeland management
- United Nations Convention to Combat Desertification

== Sources ==
=== International Reports ===
- UNCCD – "Silent demise" of vast rangelands threatens climate, food, wellbeing of billions (2024)
- UNCCD – "Thematic Report on Ecological Connectivity and Land Restoration (2025)
- IPCC – Chapter 2: Terrestrial and Freshwater Ecosystems and Their Services (2022)
- IPCC – Cross-Chapter Paper 3: Deserts, Semiarid Areas and Desertification (2022)
- IPCC Special Report – Climate Change and Land (2019)

=== Regional and National Publications ===
- De Klerk, J. N. (2004) Bush Encroachment in Namibia Archived 19 October 2023 at the Wayback Machine
- Department of Environmental Affairs (2019) Towards a Policy on Indigenous Bush Encroachment in South Africa Archived 24 November 2020 at the Wayback Machine
- Brush management as a rangeland conservation strategy: A critical evaluation, U.S. Department of Agriculture (2011)

=== Technical Guides / Grey Literature ===
- Twidwell, Dirac; Fogarty, Dillon T. (2021). A guide to reducing risk and vulnerability to woody encroachment in rangelands. University of Nebraska–Lincoln.
