= Grassland degradation =

Environmental process

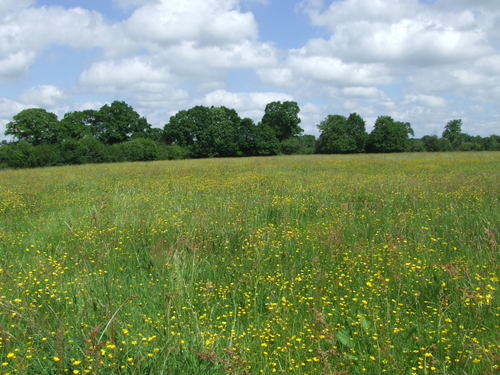
Grassland in Europe

Grassland degradation, also called vegetation or steppe degradation, is a biotic disturbance in which grass struggles to grow or can no longer exist on a piece of land due to causes such as overgrazing, burrowing of small mammals, and climate change. Since the 1970s, it has been observed to affect plains and plateaus of alpine meadows or grasslands, most notably being in the Philippines and in the Tibetan and Inner Mongolian region of China, where 2,460 km^{2} (950 sq mi) of grassland is degraded each year. Across the globe it is estimated that 23% of the land is degraded. It takes years and sometimes even decades, depending on what is happening to that piece of land, for a grassland to become degraded. The process is slow and gradual, but so is restoring degraded grassland. Initially, only patches of grass appear to die and appear brown; but the degradation process, if not addressed, can spread to many acres of land. As a result, the frequency of landslides and dust storms may increase. The degraded land's less fertile ground cannot yield crops, or animals graze in these fields. With a dramatic decrease in plant diversity in this ecosystem, more carbon and nitrogen may be released into the atmosphere. These results can have serious effects on humans such as displacing herders from their community; a decrease in vegetables, fruit, and meat that are regularly acquired from these fields; and a catalyzing effect on global warming.

== Causes ==
=== Overgrazing ===
It is thought that grassland degradation is principally attributed to overgrazing. This occurs when animals consume grass at a faster rate than it can grow back. Lately, overgrazing has become more apparent, partially because of the increase in urbanization, which makes less room for available farmland. With these smaller plots, farmers try to maximize their space and profits by densely packing their land with animals. Another point that comes with the high density of owned animals is that farmers need to be able to provide for them in the winter months, so they must gather much grass since the winter is often harsh and long in alpine meadows. As a result, the grass is given less chance to grow back due to either the rapid consumption of grass or the continual stomping of the feet of these animals. This latter suppression also encourages rats and insects to subsist here, both of which further inhibit grass growth. Overgrazing is a main cause of shrub and bush encroachment in grasslands and savanna ecosystems.

=== Small mammals ===
An increase in small animal populations has led to some grassland being degraded. These animals include the Himalayan marmots, the Brandt's and plateau vole, and the plateau pika and zokor. They damage this environment mainly through their burrowing into the ground and gnawing at the grass and other plants. Both of these actions encourage soil erosion and make it more difficult for plants to firmly ground themselves to this poor terrain. Hence, grass has a tougher time growing, and the terrain becomes spottily doused with grass. However, some do not think these animals contribute to grassland degradation. They claim that such burrowing aids in the recycling of nutrients in the soil and that the rise in population is only normal since grazing levels in these areas have also risen.

=== Climate change ===
Climate change has had a noticeable role in grassland degradation, for its characteristics are not suitable for the growth of grass. The increase in average temperatures of regions makes them less suitable for grass to grow due to the more rapid evaporation of water that was formerly utilized by the grass. Furthermore, neither periods of much rain nor stretches of drought, both of which become more prevalent with climate change, encourage the growing of grass. It is especially harmful when the times of drought are during the growing season, as is the case near the Yangtze and Yellow Rivers in China. Additionally, since alpine regions, where degradation typically occurs, are commonly of high elevation, they are more easily affected by climate and its changes. Some scientists, however, write off climate change as an insignificant cause of degradation. Climate change, particularly warmer and drier conditions, bring about suitable conditions for invading non-native grass species.

=== Human interference ===
Anthropogenic factors also play a role in the disturbance of grasslands. Degradation has been shown to appear when humans move into such areas to build, for example, roads or settlements. Roads reduce the area where grass can grow successfully; the settlements constructed by herdsmen have proven to be the most damaging to grassland since they are accompanied by their animals, which further harm the region. Also when humans convert natural grassland into farmland, they often harshly farm it by repeatedly planting the same crops year after year, and by having to do this, the soil quality is lowered when these crops suck the nutrients out of the ground. When the farmer is finally done with the land, it is in extremely poor condition for grass to grow. Another cause of degradation by man is deforestation. When these trees are demolished and taken away, the soil lacks the strong root system formerly contributed by trees; therefore, the soil is upturned, cannot support plant life as well, and is more susceptible to landslides. The gathering of medicinal plants, particularly in China, also contributed to a certain extent to degraded grasslands. Still, this practice is not done as frequently anymore.

== Degrees of severity ==
There are three main degrees of degraded grassland: light, moderate, and high. These stages are sequential so no grassland can be highly degraded without first being lightly and moderately degraded and so forth. Lightly degraded grassland is the least potent of the three and is characterized by patches of dead or no grass, spottily dispersed throughout the land. Plant and animal diversity starts to lessen but becomes really apparent in moderately degraded grasslands, in which patches of dead grass increase in size and number. Also during this stage, pests, be they rats, insects, or other grassland animals, start to disturb the environment by damaging the soil through, for instance, extracting from the soil nutrients vital to a plant's well-being or by just damaging to plants themselves. The grasslands that are affected the worst are highly degraded, which can be recognized by the vast expanse of dead grass. This quality makes this land neither arable nor suitable for livestock. Hence, it makes sense that the animal and plant diversity is extremely low. The few plants that do inhabit this area are quite poisonous and ward off any animals or plants potentially trying to move back in.

Some specific names are given to highly degraded grasslands that are particularly damaged. Heitutan is a term that signifies severely degraded grasslands. A more common and more extreme term to describe degraded grassland is "black beach" or "black-soil-land", which is exactly what it sounds like: land with nothing but black, unusable soil that extends 10–15 cm below the ground level. In the winter and autumn seasons, this land is naked of any vegetation whatsoever; but in the summer and spring, it is at least populated by toxic herbage.

== Consequences ==
There are many results stemming from grassland degradation. Two of the more logical outcomes are the decrease in arable land and a drop off in the amount of crops harvested. These two similar outcomes in some way only lead to more degradation in that farmers, who now see their land as useless, just move on to perhaps a smaller plot of land, since that is all their money can afford, after having to surrender their prior property. Hence, smaller plots are easier to be overgrazed and worked to exhaustion. Also, the numbers of livestock tend to decrease with grassland degradation, mainly because there is less grass to be eaten.

Besides anthropogenic productivity of the land, the biodiversity of degraded land also declines, as previously mentioned. With less biodiversity, this ecosystem is less adaptable to when disasters strike it It has a smaller available food supply, in terms of plants, for animals, who then may die out or more likely may relocate. Proof of this decline is that presently 15–20% of Tibetan Plateau species are now considered endangered, and now because of this animal and plant absence, the soil quality of these degraded lands is very poor. It does not hold the necessary nutrients, such as water, nitrogen, and carbon, essential to either supporting life or inviting life back to that land. As a result of such carbon and nitrogen loss in the Tibetan Plateau, $8,033/ha and $13,315/ha were respectively lost in economic terms. Soils are further weakened by dust storms whose frequency increases because of degradation. Erosion of soil becomes a bigger problem, since no longer are there as many plants to anchor in the soil. In the northern Chinese province alone, 400 million are affected every year with an associated 54 billion yuan of annual economic loss due to grassland degradation.

== Grassland restoration ==
Successful grassland restoration has several dimensions, including recognition in policy, standardisation of indicators of degradation, scientific innovation, knowledge transfer and data sharing.

Having significantly impacted many areas, some attempts at restoration have been made. In general, it takes time for implanted methods to restore degraded grassland fully. Also, there are certain ways that degraded land should be counteracted, depending upon its severity. For an area that is lightly degraded, fencing, fertilizing, or weeding. Fencing an area off allows for that plot of land to be reprieved from grazing until it reaches its normal, healthy state, in which no more patches of dead grass exist. Active brush control can serve to restore areas affected by woody plant encroachment.

The earlier the problem is addressed, the easier it is to restore that plot of land. In some cases, grazing can even be continued as long as its intensity is decreased and the situation is monitored. For instance, a method as simple as seasonally rotating fields in which animals graze have been see as effective. More structured efforts must be put into place to combat moderately degraded grasslands. These actions include reseeding and rodent control, whose goal is not to extinguish that population but rather to manage it so that it does not further degrade the land. Rodent control can be in the form of either shooting, sterilizing, or poisoning the rodents. The administered poison must have a low toxicity so that it does not cause further damage to other animals or plants; a popular toxin that has worked well is Botulin toxin C.

As for highly degraded plots of land, planting semi-artificial grassland is the umbrella term that is used to address this type of restoration. It includes weed control, fertilizing, reseeding, rodent control, and scarification. Since weeds are so numerous in highly degraded grasslands and since they suck so many nutrients from the soil, it is important to eradicate them as much as possible; and this is done so quite successfully by herbicide solutions. Semi-artificial grassland works best when the highly degraded land has 30% or more plant coverage. For degraded plots that are worse off, and hence typically fall under the category of black soil or severely degraded Heitutan grassland, artificial grassland is required and entails weed and rodent control, plowing, seeding, and fertilizing. These two methods are successful at restoring plant life to a certain extent but are also somewhat expensive. For this reason research must be done to foretell if this method would be successful by, for instance, determining whether such seeds would thrive in that environment. Once an area of land is reduced from, for instance, heavily degraded to moderately degraded, the methods of restoring it must also change.

== See also ==
- Soil degradation
- Land degradation
- Woody plant encroachment
