= List of leaders of Inner Mongolia =

List of leaders of Inner Mongolia.

== List of Chinese Communist Party secretaries ==
No.	Image	Name	Term start	Term end	Ref.
1		Ulanhu (乌兰夫) (1907–1988)	July 1947	August 1966	
2		Xie Xuegong (解学恭) (1916–1993)	August 1966	1967	
3		Teng Haiqing (滕海清) (1909–1997)	1968	1969	
4		Zheng Weishan (郑维山) (1915–2000)	1969	May 1971	
5		You Taizhong (尤太忠) (1918–1998)	May 1971	October 1978	
6		Zhou Hui (周惠) (1918–2004)	October 1978	March 1986	
7		Zhang Shuguang (张曙光) (1920–2002)	March 1986	August 1987	
8		Wang Qun (王群) (1926–2017)	August 1987	August 1994	
9		Liu Mingzu (刘明祖) (1936–2022)	August 1994	15 August 2001	
10		Chu Bo (储波) (born 1944)	15 August 2001	30 November 2009	
11		Hu Chunhua (胡春华) (born 1963)	30 November 2009	18 December 2012	
12		Wang Jun (王君) (born 1952)	18 December 2012	29 August 2016	
13		Li Jiheng (李纪恒) (born 1957)	29 August 2016	25 October 2019	
14		Shi Taifeng (石泰峰) (born 1956)	25 October 2019	30 April 2022	
15		Sun Shaocheng (孙绍骋) (born 1960)	30 April 2022	30 September 2025	
16		Wang Weizhong (王伟中) (born 1962)	30 September 2025	Incumbent	

== List of chairmen of government ==
1. Ulanhu (乌兰夫): 1947–1966
2. Teng Haiqing (滕海清): 1967–1971
3. You Taizhong (尤太忠): 1971–1978
4. Kong Fei (孔飞): 1978–1982
5. Buhe (布赫): 1982–1993
6. Uliji (乌力吉): 1993–1998
7. Yun Bulong (云布龙): 1998–2000
8. Uyunqimg (乌云其木格): 2000–2003
9. Yang Jing (杨晶): 2003–2008
10. Bagatur (巴特尔): 2008–2016
11. Bu Xiaolin (布小林): 2016–2021
12. Wang Lixia (王莉霞): 2021–2025
13. Bao Gang (包钢): 2025–
