= Inner Mongolia Autonomous Regional People's Congress =

- 14th Inner Mongolia Autonomous Regional People's Congress

Type
- Type: Unicameral; Province-level people's congress
- Established: 1954

Leadership
- Director of the Standing Committee: Sun Shaocheng
- Vice Director of the Standing Committee: Lin Shaochun; Zhang Shaochun; Duan Zhiqiang; Ai Lihua; Li Bingrong; Wu Yangang
- Secretary-General of the Standing Committee: Lin Shaochun

Structure
- Committees: Standing Committee of the Inner Mongolia Regional People's Congress
- Length of term: 5 years

Website
- www.nmgrd.gov.cn

Constitution
- Constitution of the People's Republic of China

Inner Mongolia Autonomous Regional People's Congress

Chinese name
- Simplified Chinese: 内蒙古自治区人民代表大会
Transcriptions

Mongolian name
- Mongolian script: ᠥᠪᠥᠷ ᠮᠣᠩᠭᠣᠯ ᠤᠨ; ᠥᠪᠡᠷᠲᠡᠭᠡᠨ ᠵᠠᠰᠠᠬᠤ; ᠣᠷᠣᠨ ᠤ ᠠᠷᠠᠳ ᠤᠨ; ᠲᠥᠯᠥᠭᠡᠯᠡᠭᠴᠢᠳ; ᠦᠨ ᠶᠡᠬᠡ ᠬᠤᠷᠠᠯ

The People's Congress of the Inner Mongolia Autonomous Region is the local people's congress of the Inner Mongolia Autonomous Region, China.

== History ==
On May 3, 1947, the Inner Mongolia People's Congress (内蒙古人民代表会议) officially announced the founding of the Inner Mongolia Autonomous Region and the Inner Mongolia Autonomous Government (内蒙古自治政府). On November 23, 1949, the Inner Mongolia Autonomous Government was renamed the Inner Mongolia People's Government (内蒙古人民政府).

From July 27 to August 4, 1954, the inaugural People's Congress of the Inner Mongolia Autonomous Region was convened.

== Leaderships of the Standing Committee ==
1st–4th Congress
no standing committee

5th Congress

- Term: December 1979–April 1983
- Director: Ting Mao
- Vice-director: Wang Yilun, Gao Zengpei, Shen Xinfa, Khergem, Liu Chang, Sun Lanfeng, Zhang Rugang, Han Feng, Qi Junshan, Sainbayar, Boroldai, Ochirkhuyagtu, Zhang Rongzhen (resigned April 1982)
- Secretary-General: Ning Yuncheng

6th Congress

- Term: April 1983–May 1988
- Director: Batu Bagan
- Vice-director: Li Wen (resigned May 1986), Hao Xiushan (resigned May 1986), Sun Lanfeng, Zhou Beifeng, He Yao (resigned May 1986), Sainbayar, Ochirkhuyagtu, Chao Luomeng, Bütügegči, Altanochir (resigned January 1988), Hu Zhongda (resigned January 1988)
- Secretary-General:

7th Congress

- Term: May 1988–May 1993
- Director: Batu Bagan
- Vice-director: Bütügegči, Zhang Cangong, Sainbayar, Xu Lingren, Bai Junqing, Luo Zhenyi, Sha Tuo, Zhou Rongchang (elected April 1990), Cui Weiyue (elected April 1990), Yu Xinglong (elected April 1992)
- Secretary-General: Badarakhu

8th Congress

- Term: May 1993–January 1998
- Director: Wang Qun (resigned January 1997)→Liu Mingzu (elected January 1997)
- Vice-director: Yu Xinglong, Liu Zuohui (resigned January 1997), Yi Junhua, Liu Zhenyi, Cui Weiyue, Jia Cai, Liu Zhen, Wang Xiumei, Shelebatu, Liu Xiaowang, Song Zhimin (elected January 1997)
- Secretary-General: Zhao Qingshan

9th Congress

- Term: April 1998–January 2003
- Director: Liu Mingzu
- Vice-director: Bayin, Song Zhimin (resigned January 2002), Zhang Tingwu, Bao Wenfa, Jia Cai (resigned January 2002), Wang Xiumei, Shelebatu, Zhang Hesong (resigned January 2002), Chen Ruiqing, Wan Jisheng (resigned January 2002), You Ren (elected January 2002), Wang Fengqi (elected January 2002)
- Secretary-General: Xing Baoyu

10th Congress

- Term: January 2003–January 2008
- Director: Chu Bo
- Vice-director: You Ren, Wan Jisheng, Zhou Dehai (resigned January 2004), Zhou Weide, Wang Fengqi, Sain Delger, Chen Ruiqing, Yun Xiumei, Hu Zhong (elected January 2004), Khas Bagan (elected January 2004), Zhang Guomin (elected January 2005), Liu Xiu (elected January 2007)
- Secretary-General: Khas Bagan (resigned January 2005), Liu Xiu (elected January 2005)

11th Congress

- Term: January 2008–January 2013
- Director: Chu Bo (resigned January 2010)→Hu Chunhua (elected January 2010)
- Vice-director: Lei Erdene, Luo Xiaotian (resigned February 2012), Hao Yidong, Yun Xiumei (resigned February 2012), Liu Xiu (resigned February 2012), Zhao Zhong, Khurtsa (elected January 2011), Xing Yun (elected February 2012), Hang Guilin (elected February 2012), Wu Tuanying (elected February 2012)
- Secretary-General: Hu Yifeng (resigned January 2011), Hang Guilin (elected January 2011)

12th Congress

- Term: January 2013–January 2018
- Director: Wang Jun (resigned January 2017)→Li Jiheng (elected January 2017)
- Vice-director: Khurtsa, Xing Yun (resigned January 2016), Zhao Zhong (resigned January 2016), Du Xin (resigned January 2015), Nasny Mönkh (elected January 2017), Wang Yuming (elected January 2017), Hang Guilin, Wu Tuanying, Li Rongxi, Lian Su (elected January 2016)
- Secretary-General: Bao Changqing (resigned July 2015), Sun Huimin (elected January 2016)

13th Congress

- Term: January 2018–January 2023
- Director: Li Jiheng (resigned November 2019)→Shi Taifeng (January 2020–July 2022)→Sun Shaocheng
- Vice-director: Nasny Mönkh, Wu Tuanying (resigned January 2021), Li Rongxi, Lian Su, Wang Bo, Zhang Yuanzhong (elected January 2020), He Yanlin
- Secretary-General: Shi Wenxue

14th Congress

- Term: January 2023–present
- Director: Sun Shaocheng
- Vice-director: Lin Shaochun, Zhang Shaochun, Duan Zhiqiang, Ai Lihua, Li Bingrong, Wu Yangang
- Secretary-General: Lin Shaochun

== See also ==
- System of people's congress
