= Wang Suyi =

Chinese politician (born 1961)

Wang Suyi 王素毅

Head of Inner Mongolia United Front Work Department
- In office May 2010 – July 2013
- Party Secretary: Wang Jun
- Preceded by: Fu Laiwang (伏来旺)
- Succeeded by: Bu Xiaolin

Party Secretary of Bayannur
- In office February 2008 – May 2010

Mayor of Bayannur
- In office July 2004 – February 2008

Personal details
- Born: June 1961 (age 65) Tumed Left Banner, Inner Mongolia
- Party: Chinese Communist Party (expelled)
- Education: Taiyuan University of Technology; Central Party School of the Chinese Communist Party; Cheung Kong Graduate School of Business
- Occupation: Politician
- Profession: Coal mining engineering

Wang Suyi (Chinese: 王素毅; pinyin: Wāng Sùyì; born June 1961) is a Chinese politician of Mongol ethnic ancestry. Wang was part of the senior political ranks of the Inner Mongolia Autonomous Region until 2013. During his career, he served as the Mayor and Party Secretary of Bayannur, and later the head of the Inner Mongolia United Front Work Department. He was sentenced to life imprisonment on corruption-related charges in 2014; his sentence was later reduced to twenty years and one month in prison.

== Career ==
Wang was born in Tumed Left Banner, near the city of Hohhot, in Inner Mongolia in June 1961, he is of Mongol ethnic background.

Following the resumption of the University Entrance Examination in 1977, Wang entered Taiyuan University of Technology in October 1978, majoring in coal mining engineering, where he graduated in August 1982.

Wang became involved in politics in August 1982 and he joined the Chinese Communist Party in June 1986.

In September 2001 he was promoted to become a member of the Hohhot Communist Party Standing Committee and Vice-Mayor of Hohhot, a position he held until March 2003.

Wang served as the vice-chairman of Inner Mongolia Development and Reform Commission between March 2003 to December 2003.

In December 2003, he was appointed the Party Vice-Secretary and Chairman of Bayannur League (position equivalent of a Mayor); he remained in that position until 2008, when he was promoted to become Party Secretary of Bayannur.

In May 2010, Wang was elevated to become the Head of Inner Mongolia United Front Work Department, a sub-provincial-level position due to holding a concurrent seat on the Inner Mongolia Party Standing Committee.

On June 30, 2013, it was announced that Wang would be investigated by the Central Commission for Discipline Inspection of the Chinese Communist Party for "serious violations of laws and regulations". On July 3, 2013, Wang was dismissed from his position for corruption. He was one of the first senior officials sacked for corruption after the 18th Party Congress.

== Corruption case ==
On July 31, 2014, Wang was sentenced to life imprisonment for corruption by the No. 1 Intermediate People's Court in Beijing. He was convicted of taking bribes equivalent to some 10.73 million yuan (~$1.74 million) during his time in office, in exchange for business-related favours or promotions of officials; prosecutors stated that some of these bribes were received in gold bars, Euros, and U.S. Dollars. The prosecution presented evidence that some of the bribes were accepted by his wife, and that many bribes were accepted in the form of "gifts" during wedding receptions or around holidays. Wang's legal team did not appeal the decision.

Due to his assistance in other ongoing cases, as well as general signs of repentance and voluntarily taking part in "re-education" and "cultural education", in addition to completing "labour activities" with distinction, Wang was given an award by Qincheng Prison for being "enthusiastic individual" in remolding himself. In November 2016, Wang petitioned for a reduction in his sentence. On August 22, 2017, it was announced that Wang's sentence would be reduced from life in prison to twenty years and one month, by the Beijing People's High Court.
