= Party Secretary of Inner Mongolia =

Regional government position in China

Secretary of the Inner Mongolia Autonomous Regional Committee of the Chinese Communist Party
- 中国共产党内蒙古自治区委员会书记
- Emblem of the Chinese Communist Party

- Flag of the Chinese Communist Party

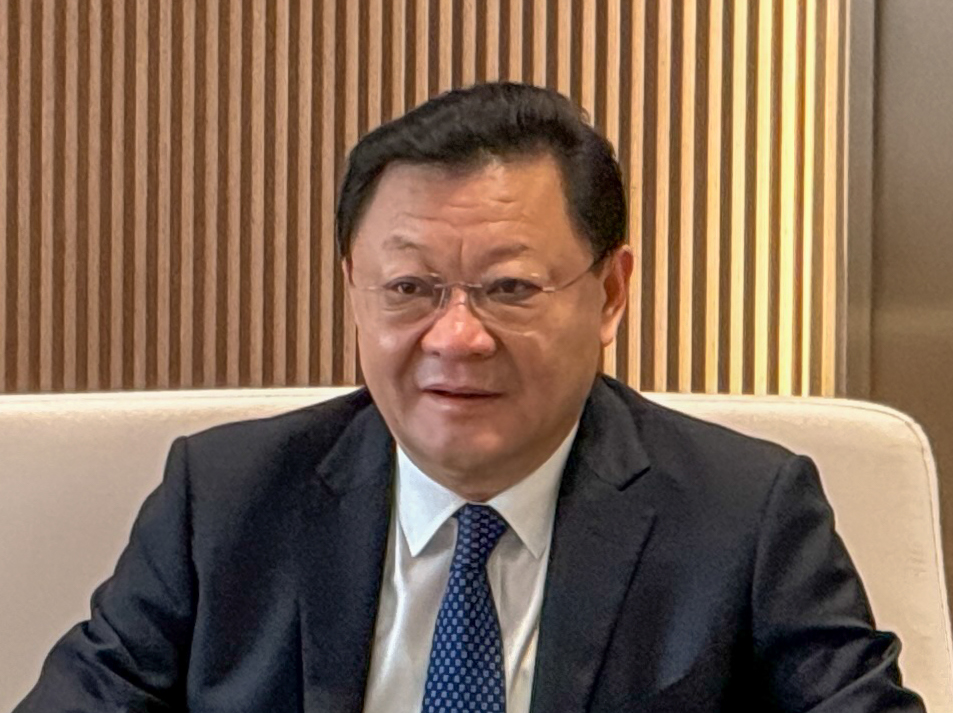
- Incumbent; Wang Weizhong since 30 September 2025
- Inner Mongolia Autonomous Regional Committee of the Chinese Communist Party
- Type: Party Committee Secretary
- Status: Provincial and ministerial-level official
- Member of: Inner Mongolia Autonomous Regional Standing Committee
- Nominator: Central Committee
- Appointer: Inner Mongolia Autonomous Regional Committee; Central Committee
- Inaugural holder: Ulanhu
- Formation: July 1947
- Deputy: Deputy Secretary; Secretary-General

The secretary of the Inner Mongolia Autonomous Regional Committee of the Chinese Communist Party is the leader of the Inner Mongolia Autonomous Regional Committee of the Chinese Communist Party (CCP). As the CCP is the sole ruling party of the People's Republic of China (PRC), the secretary is the highest ranking post in Inner Mongolia.

The secretary is officially appointed by the CCP Central Committee based on the recommendation of the CCP Organization Department, which is then approved by the Politburo and its Standing Committee. The secretary can be also appointed by a plenary meeting of the Inner Mongolia Regional Committee, but the candidate must be the same as the one approved by the central government. The secretary leads the Standing Committee of the Inner Mongolia Regional Committee, and is usually a member of the CCP Central Committee. The secretary leads the work of the Regional Committee and its Standing Committee. The secretary is outranks the chairperson, who is generally the deputy secretary of the committee.

The current secretary is Wang Weizhong, who took office on 30 September 2025.

== List of party secretaries ==
No.	Image	Name	Term start	Term end	Ref.
1		Ulanhu (乌兰夫) (1907–1988)	July 1947	August 1966	
2		Xie Xuegong (解学恭) (1916–1993)	August 1966	1967	
3		Teng Haiqing (滕海清) (1909–1997)	1968	1969	
4		Zheng Weishan (郑维山) (1915–2000)	1969	May 1971	
5		You Taizhong (尤太忠) (1918–1998)	May 1971	October 1978	
6		Zhou Hui (周惠) (1918–2004)	October 1978	March 1986	
7		Zhang Shuguang (张曙光) (1920–2002)	March 1986	August 1987	
8		Wang Qun (王群) (1926–2017)	August 1987	August 1994	
9		Liu Mingzu (刘明祖) (1936–2022)	August 1994	15 August 2001	
10		Chu Bo (储波) (born 1944)	15 August 2001	30 November 2009	
11		Hu Chunhua (胡春华) (born 1963)	30 November 2009	18 December 2012	
12		Wang Jun (王君) (born 1952)	18 December 2012	29 August 2016	
13		Li Jiheng (李纪恒) (born 1957)	29 August 2016	25 October 2019	
14		Shi Taifeng (石泰峰) (born 1956)	25 October 2019	30 April 2022	
15		Sun Shaocheng (孙绍骋) (born 1960)	30 April 2022	30 September 2025	
16		Wang Weizhong (王伟中) (born 1962)	30 September 2025	Incumbent	
