= Chairperson of Inner Mongolia =

Chairperson of the Inner Mongolia Autonomous Region People's Government
- 内蒙古自治区人民政府主席
- National Emblem of China

- Flag of China
- Incumbent; Bao Gang since 13 October 2025
- People's Government of the Inner Mongolia Autonomous Region
- Type: Head of government
- Status: Provincial and ministerial-level official
- Reports to: Inner Mongolia Autonomous Region People's Congress and its Standing Committee
- Nominator: Presidium of the Inner Mongolia Autonomous Region People's Congress
- Appointer: Inner Mongolia Autonomous Region People's Congress
- Term length: Five years, renewable
- Inaugural holder: Ulanhu
- Formation: December 1949
- Deputy: Deputy Chairperson; Secretary-General

The Chairperson of the Inner Mongolia Autonomous Region People's Government is the head of the Inner Mongolia Autonomous Region and leader of the People's Government of the Inner Mongolia Autonomous Region.

The chairperson is elected by the People's Congress of the Inner Mongolia Autonomous Region, and responsible to it and its Standing Committee. The chairperson is a provincial level official and is responsible for the overall decision-making of the regional government. The chairperson is assisted by an executive vice chairperson as well as several vice chairpersons. The chairperson generally serves as the deputy secretary of the Inner Mongolia Autonomous Regional Committee of the Chinese Communist Party and as a member of the CCP Central Committee. The chairperson is the second-highest-ranking official in the autonomous region after the secretary of the CCP Inner Mongolia Committee. The government chairman is always a Mongol. The current chairperson is Wang Lixia, who took office on 5 August 2021.

== List ==
=== People's Republic of China ===
No.	Officeholder	Term of office		Party	Ref.
No.	Officeholder	Took office	Left office	Party	Ref.
Chairman of the Inner Mongolia Autonomous Region People's Government
1	Ulanhu (1907–1988)	December 1949	April 1955	Chinese Communist Party	
Chairman of the Inner Mongolia Autonomous Region People's Committee
(1)	Ulanhu (1907–1988)	April 1955	November 1967	Chinese Communist Party	
Chairman of the Inner Mongolia Autonomous Region Revolutionary Committee
2	Teng Haiqing (1909–1997)	April 1967	May 1971	Chinese Communist Party	
3	You Taizhong (1918–1998)	May 1971	October 1978	Chinese Communist Party	
4	Kong Fei (1911–1993)	1978	1979	Chinese Communist Party	
Chairman of the Inner Mongolia Autonomous Region People's Government
(4)	Kong Fei (1911–1993)	1979	December 1982	Chinese Communist Party	
5	Buhe (1927–2017)	December 1982	May 1993	Chinese Communist Party	
6	Uliji (1933–2001)	May 1993	January 1998	Chinese Communist Party	
7	Yun Bulong (1937–2000)	January 1998	June 2000	Chinese Communist Party	
8	Uyunqimg (1942–2024)	August 2000	April 2003	Chinese Communist Party	
9	Yang Jing (born 1953)	3 April 2003	3 April 2008	Chinese Communist Party	
10	Bagatur (born 1955)	12 January 2009	30 March 2016	Chinese Communist Party	
11	Bu Xiaolin (born 1958)	30 March 2016	5 August 2021	Chinese Communist Party	
12	Wang Lixia (born 1964)	5 August 2021	4 September 2025 (Note: Suspended since 22 August 2025. Resignation accepted by Standing Committee of Inner Mongolia Regional People's Congress on 4 September 2025)	Chinese Communist Party	
—	Vacant (Note: Executive Vice Chairman Huang Zhiqiang presided over government work since 22 August 2025)				
13	Bao Gang (born 1969)	13 October 2025	Incumbent	Chinese Communist Party	
