= You Taizhong =

- 尤太忠
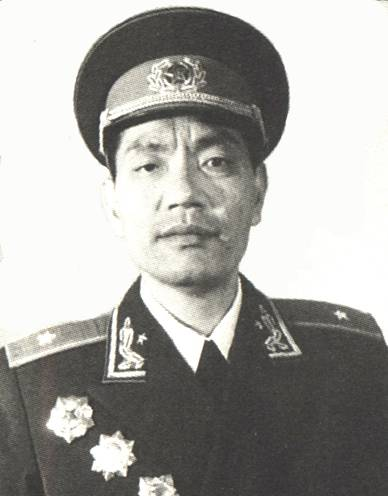
- You in 1955

Commander of the Guangzhou Military Region
- In office October 1982 – December 1987
- Preceded by: Wu Kehua
- Succeeded by: Zhang Wannian

Commander of the Chengdu Military Region
- In office January 1980 – October 1982
- Preceded by: Wu Kehua
- Succeeded by: Wang Chenghan

Chairman of the Inner Mongolia Regional Committee of the Chinese People's Political Consultative Conference
- In office December 1977 – December 1979
- Preceded by: Ulanhu
- Succeeded by: Kui Bi

First Party Secretary of Inner Mongolia
- In office May 1971 – October 1978
- Preceded by: Zheng Weishan
- Succeeded by: Zhou Hui

3rd Chairman of Inner Mongolia
- In office May 1971 – October 1978
- Preceded by: Teng Haiqing
- Succeeded by: Kong Fei

Personal details
- Born: December 1918 Guangshan County, Henan, China
- Died: 24 July 1998 (aged 79) Beijing, China
- Party: Chinese Communist Party
- Education: PLA Military Academy

Military service
- Allegiance: People's Republic of China
- Branch/service: Chinese Workers' and Peasants' Red Army; Eighth Route Army; People's Liberation Army Ground Force
- Years of service: 1931–1988
- Rank: General
- Battles/wars: Second Sino-Japanese War; Chinese Civil War; Korean War
- Awards: Order of August 1 (2nd Class Medal; 1955); Order of Independence and Freedom (2nd Class Medal; 1955); Order of Liberation (2nd Class Medal; 1955)

You Taizhong (Chinese: 尤太忠; pinyin: Yóu Tàizhōng; Wade–Giles: Yu T'ai-chung; 1918–1998) was a general of the Chinese People's Liberation Army.

== Biography ==
He was born in Guangshan County, Henan, in December 1918. He joined the Chinese Workers' and Peasants' Red Army in January 1931, the Communist Youth League of China in November 1933 and the Chinese Communist Party in June 1934. During the Second Sino-Japanese War, he was a brigade commander in the Eighth Route Army.

He was later a division commander in the People's Volunteer Army. He was promoted to major general in 1955. He served in the Nanjing, Beijing, Chengdu and Guangzhou Military Regions. During the Cultural Revolution he was Director of the Revolutionary Committee of Inner Mongolia. He retired on September 14, 1988.

He was a member of the 10th, 11th and 12th Central Committees of the CPC. He was a delegate to the 5th National People's Congress.

Government offices
Preceded by Teng Haiqing	Chairman of Inner Mongolia; 1971–1978	Succeeded by Kong Fei
Party political offices
Preceded by Zheng Weishan	First Communist Party Secretary of Inner Mongolia; 1971–1978	Succeeded by Zhou Hui
Military offices
Preceded by Teng Haiqing	Political Commissar of the Inner Mongolia Military District; 1971–1972	Succeeded by Wu Tao
Preceded by Teng Haiqing	Commander of the Inner Mongolia Military District; 1971–1978	Succeeded by Huang Hou
Preceded by Wu Kehua	Commander of the Chengdu Military Region; 1980–1982	Succeeded by Wang Chenghan
Preceded by Wu Kehua	Commander of the Guangzhou Military Region; 1982–1987	Succeeded by Zhang Wannian
Assembly seats
Preceded by Ulanhu	Chairman of the Inner Mongolia Regional Committee of the Chinese People's Political Consultative Conference; 1977–1979	Succeeded by Kui Bi
