= People's Government of the Inner Mongolia Autonomous Region =

Inner Mongolia Autonomous Region People's Government 内蒙古自治区人民政府

Leadership
- Chairperson: Bao Gang (Acting); 13 October 2025
- Parent body: Central People's Government; People's Congress of the Inner Mongolia Autonomous Region
- Elected by: People's Congress of the Inner Mongolia Autonomous Region

Website
- www.nmg.gov.cn

The People's Government of the Inner Mongolia Autonomous Region is the local administrative agency of Inner Mongolia. It is officially elected by the People's Congress of the Inner Mongolia Autonomous Region and is formally responsible to the People's Congress and its Standing Committee of the Inner Mongolia Autonomous Region People's Congress. Under the country's one-party system, the chairman is subordinate to the secretary of the Inner Mongolia Autonomous Regional Committee of the Chinese Communist Party. The government is currently headed by an acting chairperson, Bao Gang.

== History ==
On November 23, 1949, Ulanfu, Chairman of the Inner Mongolia Autonomous Government, petitioned Premier Zhou Enlai of the State Council of the Central People's Government to relocate the Inner Mongolia Autonomous Government from Ulanhot to Zhangjiakou in order to facilitate the leadership of the western region of Inner Mongolia. On November 24, Premier Zhou Enlai approved the relocation of the Inner Mongolia Autonomous Government to Zhangjiakou. After that, the Inner Mongolia Autonomous Government gradually moved to Zhangjiakou. It began to work on December 23. The relocation was completed on June 25, 1950.

The Eastern District Administrative Office of Inner Mongolia Autonomous Region was established on April 1, 1953, by merging Huna League, Xing'an League and Jirim League in Inner Mongolia Autonomous Region. The administrative office is located in Ulanhot City. On May 21, 1954, the Eastern District Administrative Office was abolished, Jirim League was restored according to the original jurisdiction, and the original Xing'an League and Huna League were merged to form Hulunbuir League.

In 1954, the People's Government of Inner Mongolia Autonomous Region moved to Guisui City and changed its name to Hohot City, which was designated as the capital of Inner Mongolia Autonomous Region.

== Organization ==
The organization of the People's Government of the Inner Mongolia Autonomous Region includes:

- General Office of the People's Government of the Inner Mongolia Autonomous Region

=== Component Departments ===
- Inner Mongolia Autonomous Region Development and Reform Commission
- Inner Mongolia Autonomous Region Education Department
- Inner Mongolia Autonomous Region Science and Technology Department
- Department of Industry and Information Technology of Inner Mongolia Autonomous Region
- Inner Mongolia Autonomous Region Ethnic Affairs Committee
- Inner Mongolia Autonomous Region Public Security Department
- Civil Affairs Department of Inner Mongolia Autonomous Region
- Inner Mongolia Autonomous Region Justice Department
- Inner Mongolia Autonomous Region Finance Department
- Inner Mongolia Autonomous Region Human Resources and Social Security Department
- Inner Mongolia Autonomous Region Natural Resources Department
- Inner Mongolia Autonomous Region Ecology and Environment Department
- Department of Housing and Urban-Rural Development of Inner Mongolia Autonomous Region
- Inner Mongolia Autonomous Region Transportation Department
- Inner Mongolia Autonomous Region Water Resources Department
- Inner Mongolia Autonomous Region Agriculture and Animal Husbandry Department
- Department of Commerce of Inner Mongolia Autonomous Region
- Department of Culture and Tourism of Inner Mongolia Autonomous Region
- Inner Mongolia Autonomous Region Health Commission
- Inner Mongolia Autonomous Region Veterans Affairs Department
- Inner Mongolia Autonomous Region Emergency Management Department
- Audit Office of Inner Mongolia Autonomous Region

=== Directly affiliated special institution ===
- State-owned Assets Supervision and Administration Commission of the People's Government of the Inner Mongolia Autonomous Region

=== Organizations under the government ===
- Inner Mongolia Autonomous Region Market Supervision Administration
- Inner Mongolia Autonomous Region Radio and Television Bureau
- Inner Mongolia Autonomous Region Sports Bureau
- Inner Mongolia Autonomous Region Statistics Bureau
- Inner Mongolia Autonomous Region Energy Bureau
- Inner Mongolia Autonomous Region Government Research Office
- Inner Mongolia Autonomous Region Forestry and Grassland Bureau
- Inner Mongolia Autonomous Region National Defense Mobilization Office
- Inner Mongolia Autonomous Region Medical Insurance Bureau (Deputy Department Level)
- Inner Mongolia Autonomous Region Petition Bureau
- Inner Mongolia Autonomous Region Government Services and Data Management Bureau

=== Departmental management organization ===
- The Inner Mongolia Autonomous Region Prison Administration Bureau is managed by the Autonomous Region Justice Department.
- The Inner Mongolia Autonomous Region Grain and Material Reserves Bureau is managed by the Autonomous Region Development and Reform Commission.
- The Inner Mongolia Autonomous Region Port Management Office is managed by the Autonomous Region Department of Commerce.
- The Inner Mongolia Autonomous Region Drug Supervision and Administration Bureau is managed by the Autonomous Region Market Supervision Bureau.
- The Cultural Heritage Bureau of Inner Mongolia Autonomous Region is managed by the Autonomous Region's Department of Culture and Tourism.
- The Inner Mongolia Autonomous Region Mine Safety Supervision Bureau is managed by the Autonomous Region Development and Reform Commission.

=== Directly affiliated institutions ===
- Inner Mongolia Autonomous Region Supply and Marketing Cooperatives Federation
- Inner Mongolia Autonomous Region Housing Fund Management Center
- Inner Mongolia Autonomous Region Literature and History Research Institute
- Inner Mongolia Autonomous Region Big Data Center
- Practice Magazine
- Inner Mongolia Autonomous Region Public Resources Transaction Management Service Center
- Inner Mongolia Radio and Television
- Inner Mongolia Radio and Television University
- Inner Mongolia Academy of Agricultural and Animal Husbandry Sciences

=== Dispatching Agency ===
- Inner Mongolia Daxinganling Key State-owned Forest Management Bureau

== See also ==
- Politics of Inner Mongolia
  - People's Congress of the Inner Mongolia Autonomous Region
  - People's Government of the Inner Mongolia Autonomous Region
    - Chairperson of Inner Mongolia
  - Inner Mongolia Autonomous Regional Committee of the Chinese Communist Party
    - Party Secretary of Inner Mongolia
  - Inner Mongolia Regional Committee of the Chinese People's Political Consultative Conference
