= Yue Puyu =

Chinese politician (born 1959)

- 岳普煜

Vice Chairperson of the Standing Committee of the Shanxi Provincial People's Congress
- In office January 2018 – January 2023

Party Secretary of Linfen
- In office May 2016 – January 2020
- Preceded by: Luo Qingyu
- Succeeded by: Dong Yibing

Mayor of Linfen
- In office January 2012 – May 2016
- Preceded by: Luo Qingyu
- Succeeded by: Liu Yuqiang

Personal details
- Born: October 1959 (age 66–67) Taiyuan, Shanxi, China
- Party: Chinese Communist Party (1985-)
- Education: Taiyuan University of Technology

Yue Puyu (Chinese: 岳普煜; born October 1959) is a former Chinese politician, who was served as the head of the vice chairperson of the Standing Committee of the Shanxi Provincial People's Congress from 2018 to 2023. He was a delegate to the 12th National People's Congress.

== Career ==
Yue was born in Taiyuan, Shanxi. He was graduated from the mechanical design and theory major of Taiyuan University of Technology in 1982. After graduating, he was enrolled to Taiyuan Heavy and served some positions. In 2000, he was served as the deputy manager, and promoted to the president in 2009.

In January 2012, Yue was appointed as the mayor of Linfen. He was appointed as the party secretary of Linfen in May 2016.

In January 2018, Yue was appointed as the vice chairperson of the Standing Committee of the Shanxi Provincial People's Congress. He was concurrently served as the party secretary of Linfen until 2020. Yue was resigned the post in January 2023.

== Investigation ==
On 30 March 2026, Yue was suspected of "serious violations of laws and regulations" by the Central Commission for Discipline Inspection (CCDI), the party's internal disciplinary body, and the National Supervisory Commission, the highest anti-corruption agency of China. Yu was expelled from the party on 2 September.

Government offices
Preceded by Luo Qingyu	Mayor of Linfen; 2012－2016	Succeeded by Liu Yuqiang
Party political offices
Preceded by Luo Qingyu	Party Secretary of Linfen; 2016－2020	Succeeded by Dong Yibing
