= Yun Bulong =

Chinese politician (1937–2000)

- 云布龙

7th Chairman of Inner Mongolia
- In office January 1998 – 12 June 2000
- Preceded by: Uliji
- Succeeded by: Uyunqimg

Personal details
- Born: December 1937 Tumed Left Banner, Inner Mongolia, China
- Died: 12 June 2000 (aged 62) Xilingol League, Inner Mongolia, China
- Party: Chinese Communist Party
- Education: Taiyuan Institute of Technology

Yun Bulong (Chinese: 云布龙; December 1937 – 12 June 2000) was a Chinese politician of Tumed Mongol ethnicity. He served as Chairman (Governor) of Inner Mongolia Autonomous Region from 1998 until his accidental death in June 2000, when his car was hit by a train at a railway crossing.

== Life and career ==
Yun Bulong was born in December 1937 in Tumed Left Banner, Inner Mongolia. As a member of the Tumed tribe, he was considered a "western" Mongol.

In September 1957, he entered the Department of Mechanical Engineering of Taiyuan Institute of Technology (now Taiyuan University of Technology), and graduated in 1962. He joined the Chinese Communist Party in December 1958.

After university, Yun worked as an engineer at Taiyuan Heavy Machinery Plant from 1962 to 1973. He then taught at Inner Mongolia University of Technology from 1973 until 1980, when he became an official at the Inner Mongolia Bureau of Standards. In December 1981 he was appointed Vice President of Inner Mongolia University, and served as Communist Party Secretary of the university from 1985 to 1990. He became Vice President of the Inner Mongolia High People's Court in August 1990.

In May 1992, Yun was appointed Vice Chairman of Inner Mongolia Autonomous Region. In December 1994, he became Deputy Communist Party Secretary, Secretary of the Commission for Discipline Inspection, and a member of the regional party standing committee of Inner Mongolia.

In September 1997, Yun was elected a member of the 15th Central Committee of the Chinese Communist Party. He was promoted to Chairman (Governor) of Inner Mongolia in January 1998, succeeding Uliji, an "eastern" Mongol.

== Death and aftermath ==
On 12 June 2000, Yun Bulong was in Inner Mongolia's Xilingol League to inspect the area's sandstorm prevention work. Deng Nan, the daughter of Deng Xiaoping, was visiting Xilingol with funds allocated for combating desertification, and Yun planned to meet her. On his way, his car was hit by a train at 7:50 pm at an unguarded railway crossing in Sengedrai, Zhenglan (Xulun Hoh) Banner. Yun was killed, together with his secretary and bodyguard, and his driver was badly injured. Yun's body was cremated a few days later, and more than 1,000 people attended his funeral.

Yun Bulong's untimely death caught the Chinese national leaders unprepared, as he had only served half of his five-year term. Premier Zhu Rongji was reportedly angered and alarmed by the poor protection afforded to such a high-ranking leader. It took two months before Yun's successor was chosen. In August 2000, Uyunqimg, a Khorchin Mongol from Liaoning province (just east of the Inner Mongolia border) who was one of the vice regional chairs, was appointed Chairwoman of Inner Mongolia.
