= 2nd Garrison Division of Beijing Military Region =

5th Cavalry Division (1952–57,1964-69) 34th Garrison Division (1969) 2nd Garrison Division of Beijing Military Region (1969-85) 2nd Garrison Brigade of Beijing Military Region (1985-92)
- Active: 1952.5 - 1957.7, 1964.10 - 1992.5
- Country: People's Republic of China
- Branch: People's Liberation Army
- Type: Division
- Role: Cavalry, Garrison
- Garrison/HQ: Baotou

5th Cavalry Division of the National Defense Force was formed in May 1952 from the 1st, 2nd, 3rd, 4th, and 5th Inner Mongolian cavalry divisions in Inner Mongolia.

As its formation the division was composed of 3 regiments:

- 13th Cavalry Regiment;
- 14th Cavalry Regiment;
- 15th Cavalry Regiment.

The division took part in the 1953 National Day's military parade in Beijing.

In July 1957 the division was inactivated, and all regiments were returned to military sub-districts control.

The division was basically composed of ethnic Mongols before 1969. From August 1958 to October 1961, the 13th and 14th Cavalry Regiment of the division took part in the counter-insurgency operations during the 1959 Tibetan uprising.

In October 1964 the division was reactivated. All three former cavalry regiments returned to the division.

The division was heavily purged in 1967-1969 during the Inner Mongolia incident, with a total of 286 officers either imprisoned or executed for allegedly being "members of the Inner Mongolia People's Revolutionary Party".

In 1969 the division was converted to a garrison unit and renamed as 34th Garrison Division. Soon after the division was further renamed as 2nd Garrison Division of Beijing Military Region in December. All cavalry regiments were converted to garrison regiments:

- 5th Garrison Regiment (former 13th Cavalry);
- 6th Garrison Regiment (former 14th Cavalry);
- 7th Garrison Regiment (former 15th Cavalry).

In 1976 Artillery Regiment of the division was activated.

In 1981 8th Garrison Regiment was activated. By then the division was composed of 4 garrison regiments, an artillery regiment, a tank battalion, and an antiaircraft artillery battalion.

In December 1985 the division was reduced and renamed as 2nd Garrison Brigade of Beijing Military Region, which consisted of 4 garrison battalions and an artillery battalion.

In May 1992 the brigade was disbanded.
