= Coal Conversion =

- Journal Cover (Volume 49, Issue 03, 2026)
- Discipline: Fuel Chemistry and Chemical Engineering
- Language: Chinese and English
- Edited by: Li Jinping (李晋平)

Publication details
- Former name: Coal Comprehensive Utilization Translations
- History: Since 1978
- Publisher: Editorial Office of Coal Conversion (China)
- Frequency: Bimonthly
- Open access: Yes
- License: Creative Commons Attribution-NonCommercial-NoDerivs (CC BY-NC-ND)

Standard abbreviations
- ISO 4: Coal Convers.

Indexing
- ISSN: 1004-4248

Links
- Journal homepage; Online access

Coal Conversion (煤炭转化, Pinyin: Meitan Zhuanhua) is a peer-reviewed, bimonthly academic journal sponsored by Taiyuan University of Technology, with academic support from the State Key Laboratory of Coal Conversion at the Institute of Coal Chemistry, Chinese Academy of Sciences. The journal covers research on coal science, coal processing and conversion technologies, and clean and efficient utilization of coal resources. The current editor-in-chief is Li Jinping (李晋平), professor at Taiyuan University of Technology.

== Overview and history ==
Coal Conversion was founded in 1978 by Luan Fu (栾茀) as Coal Comprehensive Utilization Translations (煤炭综合利用译丛, Pinyin: Meitan Zonghe Liyong Yicong) and was sponsored by the Institute of Science & Technology Information of Shanxi. During its early years, the journal mainly published translated articles and secondary literature introducing international research progress in coal comprehensive utilization. In early 1979, the journal was approved by the State Scientific and Technological Commission of the People’s Republic of China (now renamed the Ministry of Science and Technology), as a publicly distributed scientific and technological information journal. In 1987, Taiyuan University of Technology became the journal’s sponsoring institution.

In 1991, it was renamed Coal Conversion, with its focus gradually shifting to original research on coal conversion science and technology. The State Key Laboratory of Coal Conversion at the Institute of Coal Chemistry, Chinese Academy of Sciences, was subsequently added as a sponsor, alongside Taiyuan University of Technology and the Institute of Science & Technology Information of Shanxi.

In December 2014, it was included in the first list of officially recognized academic journals among 5,737 journals released by the National Press and Publication Administration of China. In 2017, the journal changed its publication frequency to bimonthly. In 2026, following approval from the National Press and Publication Administration of China, the journal was authorized to change from a Chinese-language publication to a Chinese–English bilingual publication. The first issue of the bilingual edition of Coal Conversion is scheduled for publication in January 2027.

== Publishing Scopes ==
Coal Conversion publishes research articles covering various aspects of coal science and coal transformation technologies. Its main topics include:

- coal science;
- directional hydrogenation conversion of organic matter in coal;
- coal purification and combustion;
- coal pyrolysis and coking;
- coal gasification and coal gas purification;
- coal liquefaction and product upgrading;
- catalysis in coal conversion processes;
- coal-based carbon materials;
- comprehensive utilization of coal-associated resources;
- carbon capture, utilization and storage (CCUS).

Under the climate policy of China in achieving carbon emission reduction goals of peaking greenhouse gas emissions before 2030 and carbon neutrality before 2060, the journal has also expanded its coverage to emerging topics including low-carbon utilization of coal resources, coal-based advanced materials, co-conversion of coal with biomass and organic solid wastes, and applications of artificial intelligence in coal conversion processes.

== Abstracting and indexing ==
- Scopus
- Chemical Abstracts (CA)
- Japan Science and Technology Agency database (JST)
- Index Copernicus (ICI)
- ProQuest
- Chinese Science Citation Database (CSCD)

According to Scopus, the journal has a CiteScore of 1.8 in 2025.

== Recognition ==
The journal has received multiple journal evaluation awards and publishing recognitions in China. In 2025, it received the Outstanding Journal Award of the Fourth Publishing Award by Shanxi Province, China. In 2024, it was listed in the Top 100 Science and Technology Journals by the Society of China University Journals. It is included in the World Journal Clout Index (WJCI) of Scientific and Technological Periodicals (2025), developed and released by the China Association for Science and Technology annually.

== Notable articles ==
Based on the China National Knowledge Infrastructure (CNKI), the following articles have been cited at least 200 times:

- Fan, Yanzhen; Wang, Baozhen (2000-11-25). "Surface Chemistry of Activated Carbon". Coal Conversion (4): 26–30.
- Wang, Peng; Wen, Fang; Bu, Xuepeng; Liu, Yuhua; Bian, Wen; Deng, Yiying (2005-02-25). "Study on the Pyrolysis Characteristics of Coal". Coal Conversion (1): 8–13.
- Lyu, Tai; Zhang, Cuizhen; Wu, Chao (2005-02-25). "Study on the effect of coal diameter and heating rate on the coal pyrolysis". Coal Conversion (1): 17–20.
- Xuan, Xiaoping; Yao, Qiang; Yue, Changtao; Li, Shuyuan (2002-08-25). "Progress in study of the selective catalytic reduction of NOx". Coal Conversion (3): 26–31.
- Chen, Changguo; Xian, Xuefu (1998-04-15). "Progress on the research of Coal Structure". Coal Conversion (2): 7–13.

== See also ==
- International Journal of Coal Preparation and Utilization
- Progress in Energy and Combustion Science
- Taiyuan University of Technology
