= Buhe (politician) =

Chinese politician (1927–2017)

- 布赫

5th Chairman of Inner Mongolia
- In office December 1982 – May 1993
- Preceded by: Kong Fei
- Succeeded by: Uliji

Personal details
- Born: March 1927 Tumed Left Banner, Suiyuan, China (now Inner Mongolia, China)
- Died: 5 May 2017 (aged 89–90) Beijing, China
- Party: Chinese Communist Party
- Spouse: Zhulan Qiqike
- Children: Bu Xiaolin
- Parent: Ulanhu
- Education: Yan'an Nationalities College

Buhe or Bu He (Chinese: 布赫, Mongolian: ᠪᠥᠭᠡ; Бөх; March 1927 – May 5, 2017), also known as Yun Shuguang, was a Chinese politician of Mongol descent. The eldest son of the powerful Inner Mongolia leader Ulanhu, Buhe served as the Chairman of Inner Mongolia between 1982 and 1993. Between 1993 and 2003 he was Vice Chairman of the National People's Congress.

== Biography ==
Buhe (lit., "sturdy") was born in March 1927 in Tumed Left Banner, Inner Mongolia, the eldest son of the Communist Mongol leader, former Vice President Ulanhu. His Chinese name was Yun Shuguang (Chinese: 云曙光).

During the Second Sino-Japanese War, when his father was leading the Inner Mongolian resistance against Japanese invasion, Buhe lived in the Communist base area of Yan'an, where he studied at Northern Shaanxi Public School and then Yan'an Nationalities College from 1939 to 1946. He joined the Chinese Communist Party (CCP) in 1942. After the surrender of Japan, the Communists took control of north China and Ulanhu became the founding chairman of Inner Mongolia Autonomous Region in 1947. Buhe worked as a cadre in the Cultural Bureau of Inner Mongolia.

During the Cultural Revolution, Ulanhu was overthrown and Buhe was also persecuted along with his father. He was politically rehabilitated in 1974, and was appointed Communist Party Secretary of Baotou, Inner Mongolia's main industrial city. He became Head of the CCP Publicity Department of Inner Mongolia in 1978, and then Party Chief and Mayor of Hohhot, the capital of Inner Mongolia. In December 1982, he became Chairman of Inner Mongolia, a position his father had held decades ago, and served for more than a decade until May 1993. From March 1993 to March 2003 he served two terms as Vice Chairperson of the Standing Committee of the National People's Congress.

Buhe was a member of the 12th and the 13th Central Committees of the CCP.

Buhe was also a writer and a poet, and was elected a member of the China Federation of Literary and Art Circles in 1982. He published several collections of his poems, essays, and other works.

Buhe was married to the film director Zhulan Qiqike, who died in 2011. Their daughter, Bu Xiaolin, is also a politician. She was appointed Chairwoman of Inner Mongolia in March 2016, making her the third generation of the Ulanhu family to hold that position.

Buhe died on 5 May 2017 at the age of 90. He was eulogized with the standard line of "long-tested and loyal fighter of the Communist cause, proletarian revolutionary" by the authorities, and was also designated "an outstanding leader in the realm of ethnic affairs." His memorial ceremony was held on 11 May, and was attended by CCP General Secretary Xi Jinping, Premier Li Keqiang, former paramount leader Hu Jintao, and other sitting members of the Politburo Standing Committee.
