= Bu Xiaolin =

Chinese politician

- 布小林 ᠪᠦ᠋ ᠰᠢᠶᠣ᠋ ᠯᠢᠨ

11th Chairwoman of Inner Mongolia
- In office 30 March 2016 – 5 August 2021
- Preceded by: Bagatur
- Succeeded by: Wang Lixia

Personal details
- Born: August 1958 (age 68) Tumed Left Banner, Inner Mongolia, China
- Party: Chinese Communist Party
- Parent(s): Buhe; Zhulan Qiqike
- Education: Peking University, Jilin University

Bu Xiaolin (Chinese: 布小林; pinyin: Bù Xiǎolín; Mongolian: ᠪᠦ᠋
ᠰᠢᠶᠣ᠋
ᠯᠢᠨ; born August 1958) is a Chinese politician of Mongol descent. She had served as chairwoman of the Inner Mongolia Autonomous Region People's Government (equivalent of a provincial governor) from 2016 to 2021. She is the daughter of Buhe, a former chairman of Inner Mongolia, and the granddaughter of Ulanhu, the founding chairman of Inner Mongolia Autonomous Region and a Vice President of China.

== Biography ==
Bu Xiaolin was born in August 1958 in Tumed Left Banner, Inner Mongolia. She briefly worked as a sent-down youth at the end of the Cultural Revolution, before enlisting in the People's Liberation Army. She served as a medic in No. 291 Hospital of the Inner Mongolia Military District from 1977 to 1980.

In September 1980 she entered Peking University and graduated with a degree in economic law four years later. After graduation she briefly taught law at Inner Mongolia University, before joining the regional government of Inner Mongolia in 1985. From 1998 to 2001 she enrolled in the law school of Jilin University on a part-time basis, earning a doctoral degree in law in 2001. From 2003 to 2006 she conducted post-doctoral research at the Institute of Sociology of the Chinese Academy of Social Sciences.

She was appointed Chief of Alxa League in September 2004, and Chinese Communist Party Committee Secretary two years later. In January 2008 she was promoted to Vice-Chairwoman of Inner Mongolia. In January 2014, she became Head of the United Front Work Department of Inner Mongolia, as well as a member of the Regional Party Standing Committee. She succeeded the position left vacant by Wang Suyi, who was investigated for corruption and later sentenced to life in prison.

On 30 March 2016, Bu Xiaolin was appointed acting chairwoman of Inner Mongolia, succeeding Bagatur, who had resigned. Bu Xiaolin was the second woman to serve as leader of the Inner Mongolia government, and the sixth woman in the history of the People's Republic of China (after Gu Xiulian, Uyunqimg, Song Xiuyan, Li Bin and Liu Hui) to serve as the head of a provincial-level government. She was confirmed as chairwoman on June 23.

On 20 August 2021, she was appointed vice chairperson of the National People's Congress Environment Protection and Resources Conservation Committee.

== Family ==
Bu Xiaolin is the daughter of Buhe and the granddaughter of Ulanhu, who both served as chairman of Inner Mongolia. Ulanhu was a founding general and Vice President of the People's Republic of China.

Government offices
Preceded by An Fu	Director of the Legislative Affairs Office of Inner Mongolia Autonomous Region; 1997–2003	Succeeded by Wu Zhizhong
Preceded by Wu Jinliang	Mayor of Alxa League; 2004–2006	Succeeded by Tao Jian
Preceded by Bagatur	Vice Chairperperson of Inner Mongolia Autonomous Region; 2008–2014	Succeeded by Yun Guangzhong
Preceded by Bagatur	Chairwoman of Inner Mongolia; 2016–2021	Succeeded by Wang Lixia
Party political offices
Preceded by Wu Jinliang	Communist Party Secretary of Alxa League; 2006–2008	Succeeded by Wang Yuming
Preceded by Wang Suyi	Head of the Inner Mongolia CPC United Front Department; 2014–2016	Succeeded by Wang Lixia
