= Yatai =

Yatai may refer to:

- Yatai (food cart), food stall in Japan
- Changchun Yatai, Chinese football club
- Ji Yatai (1901–1968), Chinese diplomat
- Yatai Group, a private conglomerate enterprise in China
- Yatai-bayashi, a 1972 traditional taiko piece
