= Wang Chenghan =

Chinese General

- 王诚汉
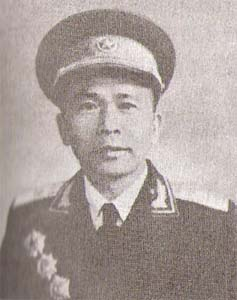
- Wang in 1955

Political Commissar of the PLA Academy of Military Sciences
- In office November 1985 – April 1990
- Preceded by: Liang Biye
- Succeeded by: Yang Yongbin

Commander of the Chengdu Military Region
- In office October 1982 – June 1985
- Preceded by: You Taizhong
- Succeeded by: Fu Quanyou

Personal details
- Born: December 1917 Hong'an County, Hubei, China
- Died: 20 November 2009 (aged 91) Beijing, China
- Party: Chinese Communist Party
- Education: Counter-Japanese Military and Political University; PLA Military Academy

Military service
- Allegiance: People's Republic of China
- Branch/service: Chinese Workers' and Peasants' Red Army; National Revolutionary Army; People's Liberation Army Ground Force
- Years of service: 1930–1990
- Rank: General
- Battles/wars: Chinese Civil War; Sino-Japanese War; Korean War
- Awards: Order of August 1 (2nd Class Medal) (1955); Order of Independence and Freedom (2nd Class Medal) (1955); Order of Liberation (1st Class Medal) (1955)

Chinese name
- Simplified Chinese: 王诚汉
- Traditional Chinese: 王誠漢
Transcriptions
Standard Mandarin
- Hanyu Pinyin: Wáng Chénghàn

Wang Chenghan (Chinese: 王诚汉; December 1917 – 20 November 2009) was a general in the People's Liberation Army of China who served as political commissar of the PLA Academy of Military Sciences from 1985 to 1990.

He was a delegate to the 5th National People's Congress. He was a member of the 12th Central Committee of the Chinese Communist Party and a member of the 13th Central Advisory Commission of the Chinese Communist Party.

== Biography ==
Wang was born in Hong'an County, Hubei, in December 1917. He enlisted in the Red Army in December 1930, and joined the Chinese Communist Party (CCP) in 1933. At the age of 17, he served as a company commander of the 25th Red Army. Together with Xu Haidong and Cheng Zihua, he broke through the tight encirclement and entered northern Shaanxi. At the age of 19, he was promoted to head of the 262nd Regiment of the 30th Red Army.

During the Second Sino-Japanese War, he served in the North China Field Army.

During the Chinese Civil War, he participated in a series of battles, such as the Campaign of the North China Plain Pocket, Menglianggu campaign, Linfen Campaign, Central Shanxi campaign, Taiyuan campaign, Xi'an campaign, Xianyang campaign, and South China campaign.

After establishment of the Communist State, in 1951, he took part in the Korean War led by Peng Dehuai. In 1955 he was awarded the military rank of major general (shaojiang) by Chairman Mao Zedong. In 1957, he became first deputy commander and chief of staff of the 60th Army, rising to commander in 1960. He was deputy commander of the Tibet Military District in 1964, and held that office until December 1968. He served as deputy commander of the Chengdu Military Region in March 1969, and thirteen years later promoted to the commander position. In December 1982 he was admitted to member of the Standing Committee of the CCP Sichuan Provincial Committee, the province's top authority. In November 1985, he was appointed political commissar of the PLA Academy of Military Sciences, serving in the post until his retirement in April 1990. He was promoted to the rank of general (shangjiang) in 1988.

On 20 November 2009, he died of an illness in Beijing, at the age of 92.

== Autobiography ==
- 王诚汉回忆录 [Memoirs of Wang Chenghan] (in Chinese). Beijing: PLA Publishing House. 2004. ISBN 9787506546263.

Military offices
Preceded by You Taizhong	Commander of the Chengdu Military Region; 1982–1985	Succeeded by Fu Quanyou
Preceded by Liang Biye	Political Commissar of the PLA Academy of Military Sciences; 1985–1990	Succeeded by Yang Yongbin
