= Xie Feng (politician) =

Chinese politician

Xie Feng (Chinese: 解峰) (1922 – August 21, 2004) was a People's Republic of China politician. He was born in Yi County, Hebei Province. He joined the Chinese Communist Party in 1939. He was governor of his home province.

Preceded by Zhang Shuguang	Governor of Hebei	Succeeded by Yue Qifeng
