= Hanggai (village) =

Hanggai 杭盖村 • ᠬᠠᠩᠭᠠᠢ
- Village
- Location in Inner Mongolia
- Coordinates: 40°32′50″N 111°11′45″E
- Country: China
- Autonomous Region: Inner Mongolia
- Prefecture-level city: Hohhot
- Banner: Tumed Left Banner
- Township: Taban Sain

Hanggai (Mongolian: ᠬᠠᠩᠭᠠᠢ, Хангай; Chinese: 杭盖村; pinyin: Hánggàicūn) is a village in Taban Sain Township, Tumot Left Banner, Hohhot, Inner Mongolia Autonomous Region, China. Its population is about 1500, mostly Han Chinese, with some Mongol families.
