= Inner Mongolia incident =

Political purge in Inner Mongolia, China, during the Cultural Revolution

Inner Mongolia Incident
- Part of Cultural Revolution in China
- Native name: 内人党事件
- Location: Inner Mongolia, China
- Date: 1967; 1967 – 1969
- Target: Ethnic Mongols, alleged former members of the Inner Mongolian People's Revolutionary Party (PRP), "separatists" and Enemies of the Chinese Communist Party
- Attack type: Political repression, ethnic cleansing, mass murder, mass arrests and abuse
- Deaths: 16,222-100,000
- Injuries: 81,000
- Victim: 1,000,000+ (accused or persecuted)
- Perpetrators: Chinese Communist Party, People's Liberation Army, Teng Haiqing
- Motive: Cultural Revolution instigated by Mao Zedong, elimination of political enemies, persecution of ethnic minorities, prevention of political independence

Inner Mongolia incident
- Simplified Chinese: 内人党事件
- Traditional Chinese: 內人黨事件
Transcriptions
Standard Mandarin
- Hanyu Pinyin: nèiréndǎng shìjiàn

Inner Mongolia People's Revolution Party purge incident
- Simplified Chinese: 内蒙古人民革命党肃清事件
- Traditional Chinese: 內蒙古人民革命黨肅清事件
Transcriptions
Standard Mandarin
- Hanyu Pinyin: Nèiměnggǔ rénmín gémìngdǎng sùqīng shìjiàn

The Inner Mongolia incident, or the Inner Mongolia People's Revolutionary Party purge incident (Chinese: 内人党事件; pinyin: Nèi rén dǎng shìjiàn), was a massive political purge which occurred during the Cultural Revolution in Inner Mongolia. The purge was supported by the Central Committee of the Chinese Communist Party and was led by Teng Haiqing, a lieutenant general (zhong jiang) of the People's Liberation Army. It took place from 1967 to 1969, during which over a million people were categorized as members of the already-dissolved Inner Mongolian People's Revolutionary Party (PRP), and tens of thousands of people, most of whom were Mongols, were lynched and massacred.

According to the official complaint from the Supreme People's Procuratorate in 1980 after the Cultural Revolution, during the purge, 346,000 people were arrested, 16,222 people were persecuted to death or killed directly, and over 81,000 were permanently injured and disabled. Other estimates have put a death toll between 20,000 and 100,000, while hundreds of thousands were arrested and persecuted, and over a million people were affected.

After the Cultural Revolution, the purge was regarded as a "mistake" and its victims were rehabilitated by the Chinese Communist Party (CCP) during the "Boluan Fanzheng" period. The commander of the purge, Teng Haiqing, received no trial because the Central Committee of CCP thought he had made achievements during the wars in the past. On the other hand, some of Teng's affiliates received various terms of imprisonment, with a main Mongol affiliate sentenced to 15 years in prison. Teng Haiqing himself was made to apologize in public sessions and sent for re-education at the end of 1969.

== Historical background ==
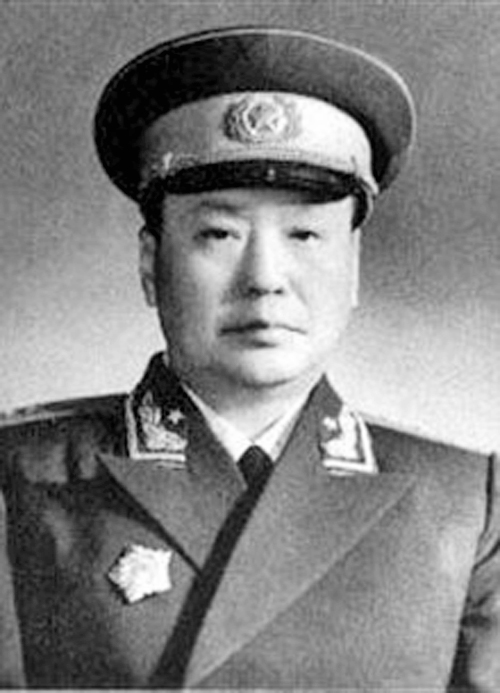
Ulanhu, the founding Chairman of Inner Mongolia Autonomous Region.

On 16 May 1966, the Cultural Revolution was officially launched in mainland China by Mao Zedong with the help of Cultural Revolution Group. From 7 June to 20 July 1966, Ulanhu, then Chairman of China's Inner Mongolia Autonomous Region, was accused of being an "anti-Party activist" and was persecuted. At the time, Ulanhu was also criticized by top leaders such as Liu Shaoqi and Deng Xiaoping, whom themselves were soon to be persecuted as well in the Cultural Revolution. On 16 August 1966, Ulanhu was dismissed from his official positions and was placed under house arrest in Beijing. Some of his close affiliates such as Ji Yatai were also persecuted.

In May 1967, Teng Haiqing was appointed the top leader of the Inner Mongolia Military Region. On 27 July 1967, the northern branch of the Central Committee of the Chinese Communist Party announced that Ulanhu had conducted five crimes, including anti-Maoism, anti-socialism, separatism, and so on. Supported by Marshal Lin Biao, Jiang Qing (Mao's wife) and Kang Sheng (head of the internal intelligence agency of the Central Social Affairs Department), Teng began to initiate a massive purge which was intended to "dig out" the "poison of Ulanhu" in the Inner Mongolia region.

During the purge, the already-dissolved Inner Mongolian People's Revolutionary Party (PRP) was claimed to have re-established itself and have grown into power since 1960. And, Ulanhu was accused of being the leader of this Party. At least hundreds of thousands of people in Inner Mongolia were "categorized" as members of the PRP, whom were regarded as separatists and were subsequently persecuted. During the purge, the Mongolian language was banned from publications and Mongols were accused of being "the sons and heirs of Genghis Khan".

== Lynching and massacre ==
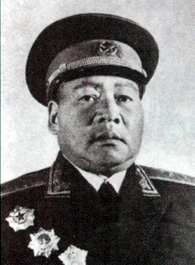
Lieutenant general Teng Haiqing was the commander of the Inner Mongolia purge.

=== Methods of torturing and killing ===
The methods used in lynching and killing during the purge included branding with hot irons, feeding furnace wastes, removing livers, hanging, cutting tongues and noses, piercing nails, piercing vaginas, pouring hot saline water into wounds, and more.

=== Death toll ===
According to the official complaint from the Supreme People's Procuratorate in 1980 after the Cultural Revolution, during the purge, 346,000 people were arrested (75 percent were Mongols), over 16,000 were persecuted to death, and over 81,000 were permanently injured and disabled.

Other estimates include:

- According to scholar Ba He (巴赫): close to 100 thousand people were killed, 700–800 thousand were arrested and persecuted, and over a million were affected.
- According to Chinese historian Song Yongyi (宋永毅) of the California State University, Los Angeles: an unofficial source points out that the death toll was at least 40,000; 140,000 reached the point of permanent deformity, and nearly 700,000 were persecuted.
- According to historian Lhamjab A. Borjigin (拉幕札部), who was arrested and prosecuted by the Chinese government in 2019 for his research: at least 27,900 were killed and 346,000 were imprisoned and tortured.

=== Notable figures killed ===
- Ji Yatai, 1st Ambassador of the People's Republic of China to Mongolia (1950–1953) and vice-chairman of Inner Mongolia Autonomous Region.
- Ha Fenge, Vice-chairman of Inner Mongolia Autonomous Region.
- Darijaya, Vice-chairman of the Government of Inner Mongolia.

== Rehabilitation ==
After the Cultural Revolution, China's new paramount leader Deng Xiaoping came to power in December 1978 and, together with Hu Yaobang and others, launched a large-scale campaign to rehabilitate victims in the so-called "unjust, false, and incorrect cases (冤假错案)" made during the Cultural Revolution.

The Inner Mongolia incident was regarded as a "mistake" and its victims were rehabilitated by the Chinese Communist Party (CCP) in 1979 during the "Boluan Fanzheng" period, blaming the entire purge on "the Gang of Four and the Lin Biao Clique". Trials for the Gang of Four began in 1980.

In the 1980s, there were calls for trial of Teng Haiqing, the commander of the purge in Inner Mongolia, but the Central Committee of the CCP thought Teng had made achievement during past wars and therefore he would not be further punished for leading the purge. On the other hand, some of Teng's affiliates received various terms of imprisonment, with a main Mongol affiliate, Wulan Bagan (乌兰巴干), sentenced to 15 years in prison.

== See also ==
- Mass killings under communist regimes
- List of massacres in China
- Cultural Revolution
- Boluan Fanzheng
- Cleansing the Class Ranks
- Jindandao incident
