= List of ambassadors of China to Mongolia =

Coordinates: 47.923460°N 106.924259°E

Chinese Ambassador to Mongolia
- National emblem of China
- Incumbent; Vacant
- Inaugural holder: Ji Yatai
- Formation: 6 July 1950; 76 years ago

The Chinese ambassador to Mongolia is the official representative of the People's Republic of China to Mongolia

== List of representatives ==
Diplomatic agrément/Diplomatic accreditation	ambassador	Chinese language zh:中国驻蒙古大使列表	Observations	Premier of the People's Republic of China	List of heads of state of Mongolia	Term end
October 16, 1949			The governments in Ulaanbaatar and Beijing established diplomatic relations.	Zhou Enlai	Gonchigiin Bumtsend	
July 6, 1950	Ji Yatai	zh:吉雅泰		Zhou Enlai	Gonchigiin Bumtsend	July 1953
September 1954	He Ying (PRC diplomat)	zh:何英 (外交官)	(*November 1914 - October 3, 1993): From September 1954 to August 1958 he was ambassador to Mongolia.; From April 1963 to April 1964 he was ambassador in Kampala (Uganda).; From July 1964 to May 1969 he was ambassador in Daressalam (Tanzania).	Zhou Enlai	Jamsrangiin Sambuu	August 1958
September 1958	Xie Fusheng	zh:谢甫生		Zhou Enlai	Jamsrangiin Sambuu	August 1963
September 1963	Zhang Canming	zh:张灿明	From June 1957 to August 1962 he was ambassador in Colombo (Ceylon).; From September 1963 - January 1967 Ambassador of the People's Republic of China to Mongolia.; From March 1973 to July 1975 he was ambassador in Sana'a (North Yemen); From September 1975 to November 1978 he was ambassador in Helsinki (Finland).	Zhou Enlai	Jamsrangiin Sambuu	January 1967
August 1971	Xu Wenyi	zh:许文益	From August 1971 to February 1974 he was ambassador in Ulan Bator (Mongolia).; From April 1979 to April 1981 he was ambassador in Beirut (Lebanon).	Zhou Enlai	Jamsrangiin Sambuu	February 1974
October 1974	Zhang Weilie	zh:张伟烈	From September 1960 to November 1965 he was ambassador in Baghdad (Iraq).; From February 1971 to May 1974 he was Chinese Ambassador to Morocco.; From October 1974 to April 1978 he was ambassador in Ulan Bator (Mongolia).; From July 1978 to June 1981 he was ambassador in Bangkok (Thailand).	Zhou Enlai	Yumjaagiin Tsedenbal	April 1978
August 1978	Meng Ying	zh:孟英	(1921): From January 1965 to January 1966 he was Ambassador in Central Africa.; From August 1978 to July 1983 he was ambassador in Ulanbator Mongolia.	Hua Guofeng	Yumjaagiin Tsedenbal	July 1983
November 1983	Li Juqinh	zh:李举卿		Zhao Ziyang	Yumjaagiin Tsedenbal	June 1989
August 1989	Zhang Delin	zh:张德麟		Li Peng	Jambyn Batmönkh	February 1993
March 1993	Pei Jiayi	zh:裴家义		Li Peng	Punsalmaagiin Ochirbat	August 1996
September 1996	Qi Zhijia	zh:齐治家		Li Peng	Punsalmaagiin Ochirbat	August 1999
August 1999	Huang Jiakui	zh:黄家骙		Zhu Rongji	Natsagiin Bagabandi	October 2003
November 2003	Gao Shumao	zh:高树茂		Wen Jiabao	Tsakhiagiin Elbegdorj	July 2007
August 2007	Yu Hongyao	zh:余洪耀	From August 2007 to January 2011 he was ambassador in Ulaanbaatar.; From October 2011 to December 2013 he was ambassador to the Maldives.	Wen Jiabao	Nambaryn Enkhbayar	January 2011
February 2011	Wang Xiaolong	zh:王小龙	(* June 1965 in Hebei )	Wen Jiabao	Tsakhiagiin Elbegdorj	June 2015
August 2015	Xing Haiming	zh:邢海明		Li Keqiang	Tsakhiagiin Elbegdorj	December 2019
January 2020	Chai Wenrui	zh:柴文睿	* This appears to be Amb Chai's sixth posting to Mongolia, the only foreign country he has been posted to	Li Keqiang	Khaltmaagiin Battulga	September 2023
September 2023	Shen Minjuan	zh:沈敏娟		Li Qiang	Ukhnaagiin Khürelsükh	
