= High School Affiliated to Minzu University of China =

The High School Affiliated to Minzu University of China
- 中央民族大学附属中学
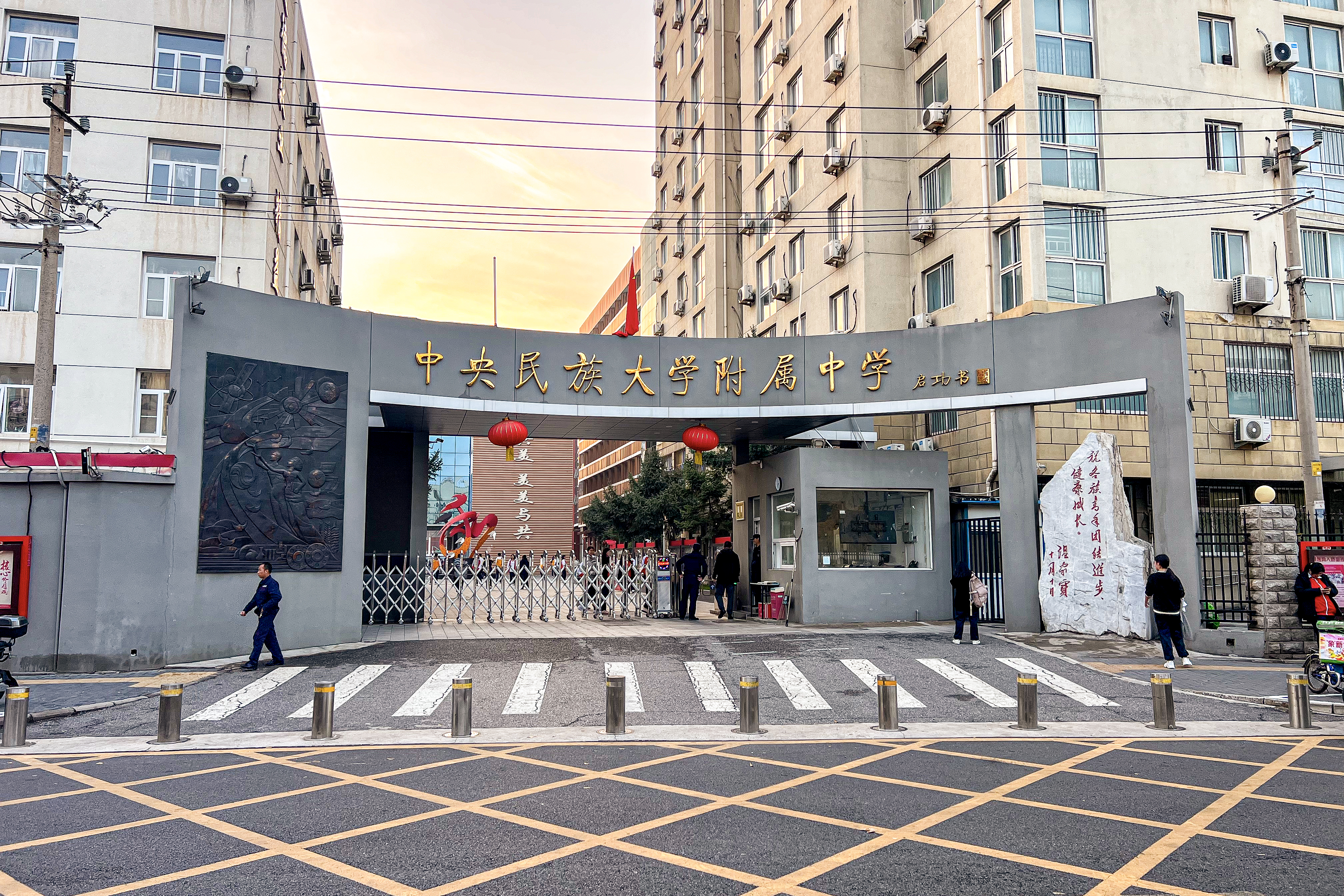
- Haidian campus

Location
- No.5 Fahuasi Jie, Haidian District (100081); Beijing; China

Information
- Type: Public
- Motto: Perfection and Unity 各美其美，美美与共
- Established: 1913
- Principal: Tang Hongbo (唐洪波)
- Enrollment: 1,800
- Campus: Urban, 1.7 acres
- Colors: Red and Green
- Nickname: MDFZ
- Affiliations: Minzu University of China
- Website: https://mdfz.muc.edu.cn

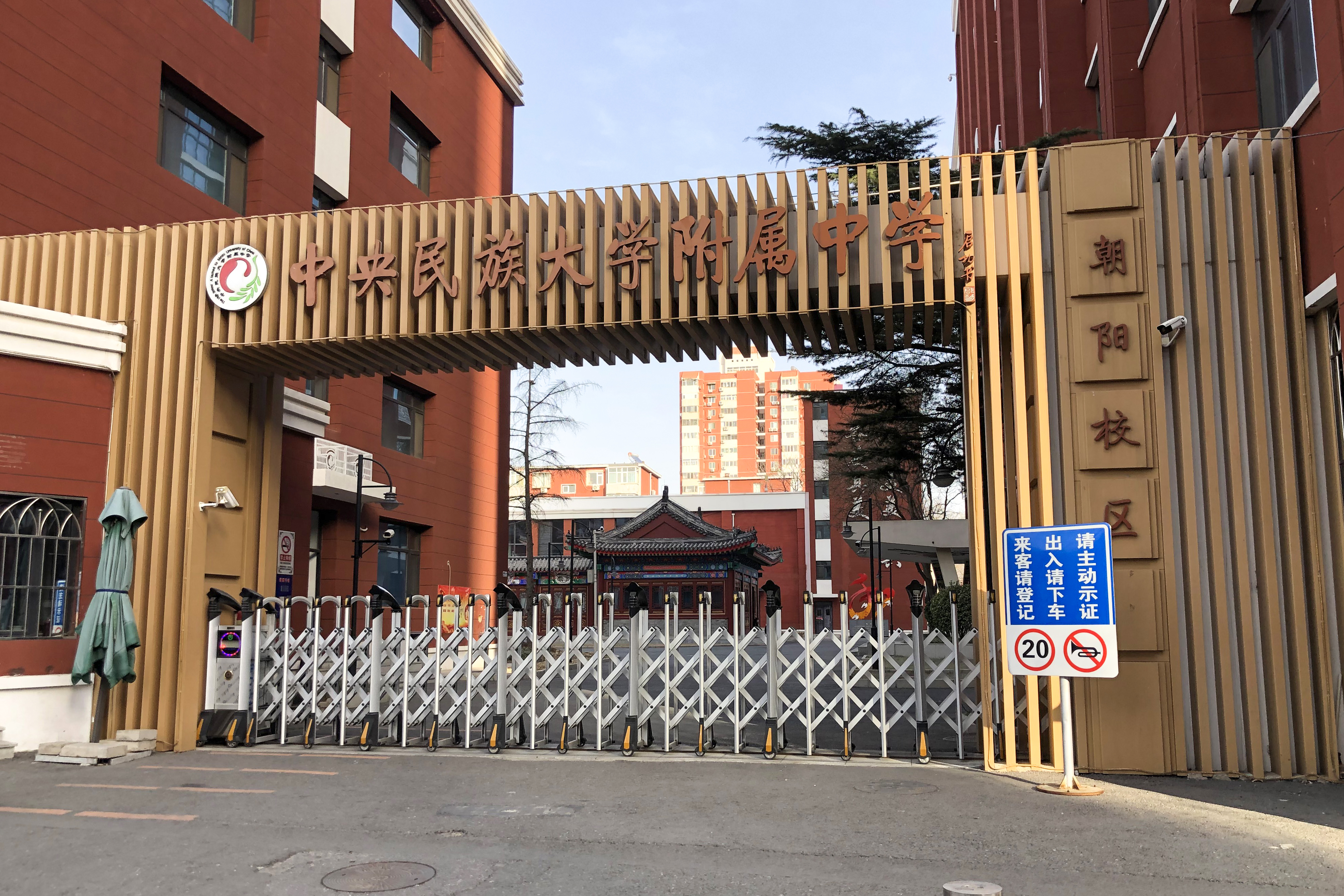
Chaoyang Campus

The High School Affiliated to Minzu University Of China (Chinese: 中央民族大学附属中学), colloquially Mindafuzhong abbreviated to MDFZ (Chinese: 民大附中), is the affiliated high school of Minzu University of China, and is one of the prestigious high schools in Beijing.

The school is a public, fully accredited secondary school directly affiliated with the National Ethnic Affairs Commission and managed by the Minzu University of China. It operates independently as a legal entity. The school has two campuses: the Haidian Campus located at No. 5 Jia, Fahuasi, Haidian District, Beijing, and the Chaoyang Campus at No. 1 Jia, Tianshuiyuan, Jintai Road, Chaoyang District, Beijing.

== History ==
The High School Affiliated to Minzu University of China traces its origins back to the Mongolian and Tibetan School, established in 1913. The school has produced many prominent figures, including former Vice President Ulanhu and renowned poet Guo Xiaochuan. Chairman of the Chinese Communist Party Mao Zedong and Premier Zhou Enlai showed significant care for the school, personally meeting with student representatives. Former Premier Wen Jiabao wrote a dedication for the school's 95th anniversary. Various Party and state leaders have supported and visited the school. On the occasion of its centenary, General Secretary of the Chinese Communist Party Xi Jinping acknowledged the school's contribution to nurturing numerous outstanding talents from ethnic minorities.

The predecessor of the High School Affiliated to Minzu University of China was the Mongolian and Tibetan School, established in 1913. It was renamed the Mongolian and Tibetan Specialized School in 1918, and in 1929, it was renamed the Mongolian and Tibetan School of the Mongolian and Tibetan Commission in Beiping. From 1937 to 1949, before the founding of the People's Republic of China, it was renamed the National Beiping Mongolian and Tibetan School. In 1950, it was renamed the Mongolian and Tibetan School. In 1951, the school was named the High School Affiliated to the Central University for Nationalities. During the Cultural Revolution, the school was renamed Beijing No. 160 High School. In 1978, it was restored to its original name. In 1993, it was renamed the High School Affiliated to Minzu University of China.

== Faculty and staff ==
The school currently employs 346 staff members, including 303 full-time teachers. Among them are 2 special-grade teachers, 5 senior-grade teachers, and 70 senior teachers. The faculty includes 11 Ph.D. holders and 191 master's degree holders, with 43 teachers recognized as district-level or higher key teachers and subject leaders.

== Achievements and recognition ==
Since its establishment in 1913, the school has been given awards by the National Ethnic Affairs Commission and Beijing Municipality Education Commission.

The school has received several honors and recognitions, including:

- Designation as a National Characteristic High School in 2011.
- Awarded the title of "Century-old School" in the capital in 2013.
- Honored as a "National Model Collective for Ethnic Unity and Progress" in 2014.
- Became one of the high-quality high schools in Beijing in 2015, and recognized as a Haidian District Campus Football Experimental School.
- Named a "Beijing Model School for Ethnic Unity Education" in 2017.
- Included in the third batch of Civilized Campuses for Primary and Secondary Schools in Beijing in 2018.
- Selected as a Beijing Youth Taiwan Education Base, Beijing-Taiwan Primary and Secondary School Exchange Base, and China Study and Practice Education Model School in 2019.
- Rated as a "New Brand School" in Haidian District in 2020.
- Selected as a "Boyar Talent Joint Training Base" by Peking University in 2021.

== Expansion and community involvement ==
Minzu High School continues to expand its educational resources through its educational group model, which now includes two campuses (Haidian and Chaoyang), two branch schools in Beijing (Changping and Fengtai), and ten branch schools outside Beijing (in locations such as Lingshui and Sanya in Hainan, Kunming and Honghe in Yunnan, Guiyang, Yushu, Hohhot, Qingdao, and Xiongan). The school also undertakes the “2+3+2” joint education program with Beijing College of Finance and Commerce, annually educating 800 high school students. Additionally, the school’s staff and students actively engage in teaching assistance, poverty alleviation, professional development, and training programs, providing support to schools and students in regions such as Guangxi, Guizhou, Yunnan, Gansu, Ningxia, Qinghai, Hunan, Jilin, and Inner Mongolia.

== Organization ==
=== Leadership ===
Headmaster: Tang Hongbo (唐洪波)

Secretary of the Party Committee: （Vacancy）

Deputy Secretary of the Party Committee: Tang Hongbo (唐洪波), Li Pin (李品)

Deputy Executive Secretary of the Party Committee: Tong Lijuan (佟丽娟)

Vice Headmaster: Wang Guode (王国德), Wei Ligong (魏立功), Yang Ling (杨岭)

=== School Office and Party Committee Office ===
Director: Ni Le (妮乐)

Deputy Director: Yang Na (杨娜), Zhang Pengfei (张鹏飞)

=== Moral Education Department ===
Director: Gao Yuan (高原)

Deputy Director: Zhao Bin (赵彬), Wang Liusi (王柳丝), Yang Duo (杨夺)

=== Youth League Committee ===
Secretary of the Communist Youth League: Yang Duo (杨夺)

== Notable alumni ==
=== Law and Politics ===
- Ulanhu (乌兰夫) - Vice President of the People's Republic of China (1983-1988).
