= Zhulan Qiqike =

- 珠兰齐齐柯
- Born: 1928; Fuxin Mongol Autonomous County, Liaoning, China
- Died: 26 September 2011 (aged 82–83); Beijing, China
- Education: Lu Xun Academy of Fine Arts
- Occupation: Director
- Years active: 1956–1991
- Spouse: Buhe (m. 1985; div. 1989)
- Children: 3, including Bu Xiaolin

Zhulan Qiqike (Chinese: 珠兰齐齐柯, 1928 – September 26, 2011) was a Chinese film director.

== Biography ==
Zhulan Qiqike was born in 1928 in rural Fuxin Mongol Autonomous County, Liaoning.

=== Artistic work ===
In 1946, Zhulan Qiqike joined the Chinese Communist Party, devoting herself to the literary and artistic propaganda work of the party. During the Kuomintang Islamic insurgency, she accompanied the Inner Mongolia Art Troupe to the frontline to perform for the People's Liberation Army. In 1953, during the Korean War, she accompanied the Motherland Condolence Corps to North Korea and performed for the officers and soldiers of the People's Volunteer Army and their wounded and sick.

In the early 1950s, she enrolled in the Northeast Lu Xun Academy of Fine Arts and the Central Academy of Drama's director class, which included Soviet lecturers. She graduated in July 1956, and returned to Inner Mongolia. There she served as deputy head and director of the Inner Mongolia Repertory Theater, deputy director of Inner Mongolia Film Studio, and director of the Federation of Inner Mongolia. During this period, she choreographed and directed films such as Prairie Morning Music and Li Wuhai, as well as news film documentaries such as Baogang Album and Red Flag in Inner Mongolia. She also directed the Soviet drama Pradon Klecheko, Young Guards, the Mongolian multi-act drama Golden Eagle, and the large-scale opera Oroqen New Song.

=== Political life ===
Zhulan Qiqike was a member of the First Committee of the Inner Mongolia Autonomous Region Chinese People's Political Consultative Conference. From 1983 to 1991, she served successively as Secretary of the Party Leadership Group, Deputy Director (in charge of work), Director, and Editor-in-Chief of the Broadcasting Administration Bureau of Inner Mongolia Autonomous Region. During this period, and a 77-meter-high TV complex was built on the 40th anniversary of the founding of the Inner Mongolia Autonomous Region. The CPPCC also built 3500 km of microwave trunk throughout the Inner Mongolia Autonomous Region.

=== Retirement ===
After retiring in 1991, she worked to promote and preserve Mongolian long song. Through her efforts, the first Mongolian long song seminar was held in Hohhot on May 23, 1997. In June 2000, she presided over the Second Mongolian Long Song Seminar. She edited and published "Inner Mongolia Long Song Symposium Collection". She successfully lobbied for the Mongol Clan Chang Tune to be declared as one of the Masterpieces of the Oral and Intangible Heritage of Humanity. For this she received the Outstanding Contributor Award for National Literature and Art by the Ulanhu Foundation. In her later years, she also served as the vice chairman of the Chinese Television Artists Association and the chairman of the Chinese Minority Film Art Research Association.

=== Death ===
On September 26, 2011, Zhulan Qiqike died of illness in Beijing.
