= Ji Yatai =

Chinese diplomat

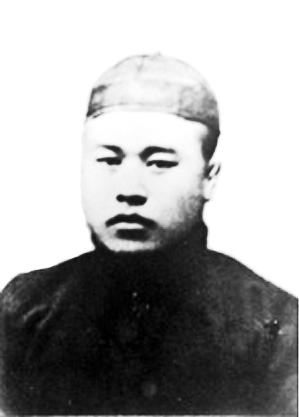
Ji Yatai

Zayaatai (Mongolian: ᠵᠠᠶᠠᠭᠠᠲᠠᠢ, Заяатай) or Ji Yatai (Chinese: 吉雅泰) (October 1901 – March 12, 1968) was a Chinese diplomat. He was the 1st Ambassador of the People's Republic of China to Mongolia (1950–1953). He was born in Tumed Left Banner, Inner Mongolia and educated in Moscow, Soviet Union.

Preceded by New office	Ambassador of China to Mongolia; 1950–1953	Succeeded by He Ying
