= Taiyuan Heavy =

Chinese construction equipment manufacturer

Taiyuan Heavy Industry Co., Ltd.
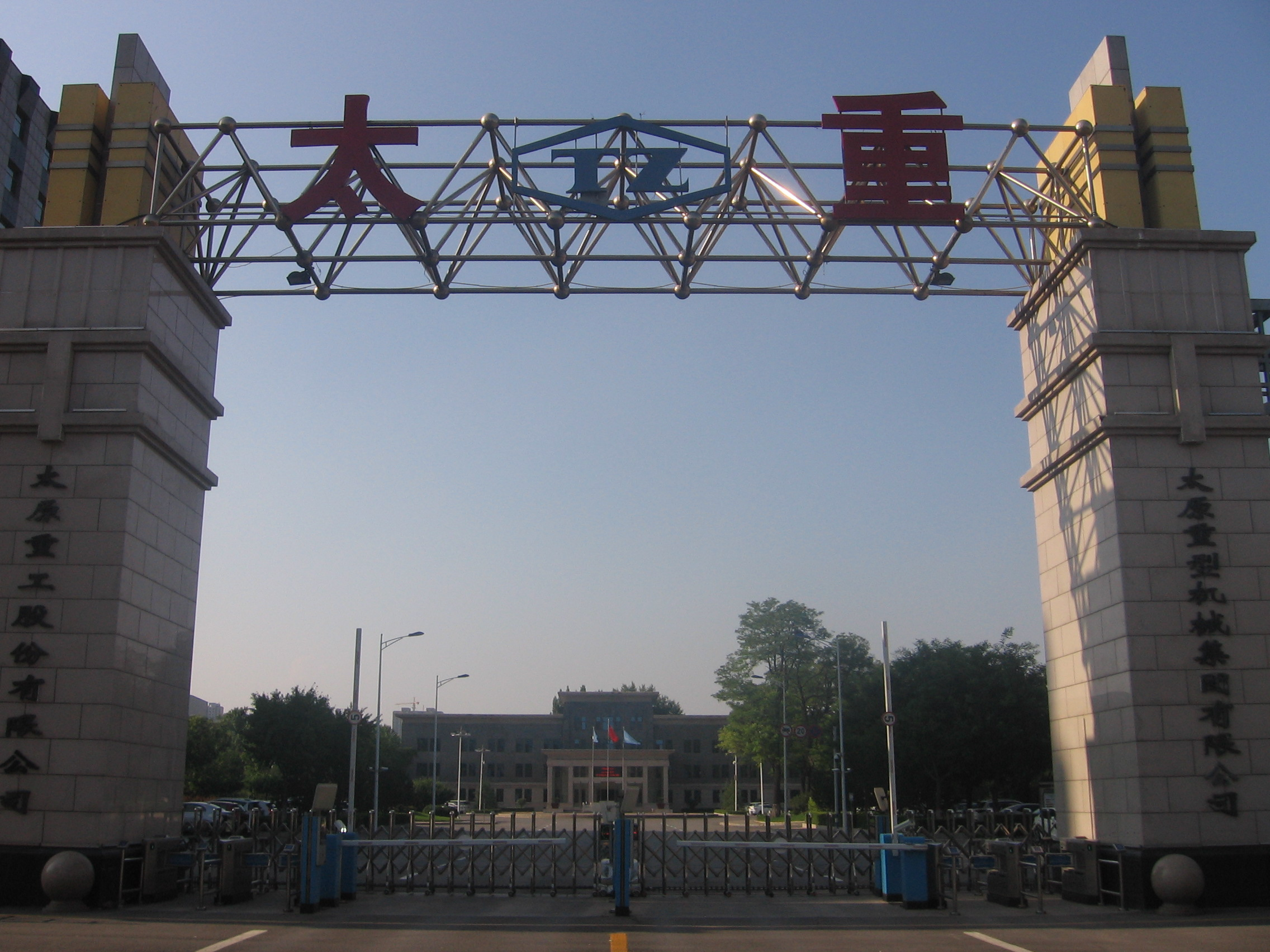
- Industry: Machinery
- Founded: 1950
- Headquarters: Taiyuan, Shanxi
- Products: Cranes, train wheels, mining equipment, wind turbines, coal chemical equipment, gearboxes, forgings & castings
- Website: tyhi.com

Taiyuan Heavy Industry Co., Ltd. is a Chinese manufacturer of industrial machinery including products ranging from construction equipment to train wheels. It is one of the biggest makers of heavy machinery in China and competes with CITIC Heavy Industries and China First Heavy Industries.

It is known for producing construction equipment with powerful specifications. The company along with partners Sinochem and Synfuels Technology developed a 6,400 ton capacity super heavy lifting gantry with hydraulic hoisting, which was built to erect refinery vessels in the petrochemical industry. The company also produces an 1800-ton excavator which it calls the world's largest such kind of machinery.
