= Zheng Weishan =

Chinese lieutenant general

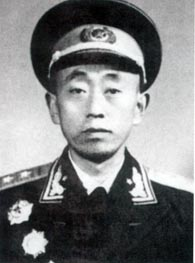
- Weishan in 1955
- Native name: 郑维山
- Born: August 5, 1915; Macheng, Republic of China
- Died: 9 May 2000 (aged 84) Beijing, People's Republic of China
- Allegiance: Communist China; Republic of China; China
- Rank: lieutenant general
- Conflicts: Chinese Civil War; Second Sino-Japanese War

Zheng Weishan (Chinese: 郑维山; August 5, 1915 – May 9, 2000) was a People's Liberation Army lieutenant general and People's Republic of China politician. He was born in Macheng, Hubei Province (his birthplace is now part of Xin County, Henan Province). He was Chinese Communist Party Committee Secretary of Inner Mongolia.

Zheng was a general in the North China Field Army.

Zheng was deputy commander of the Beijing Military region. On May 27, 1967, he was dispatched to Inner Mongolia at the head of the Sixty-Ninth army. He moved to the city of Hohhot and took control of railroad, radio stations, newspapers, and public security. On December 19, 1969, the local Inner Mongolian Teng leadership was deposed, and military rule was declared. Zheng took power as the head of that military regime, placing Inner Mongolia directly under the control of the Beijing Military Region.

In January 1971 Zheng was purged by Mao in order to weaken his factional allies Lin Biao and Chen Boda.

Party political offices
Preceded by Teng Haiqing	Communist Party Chief of Inner Mongolia	Succeeded by You Taizhong
