= Zhang Shuguang (governor) =

- 张曙光

Party Secretary of Inner Mongolia
- In office March 1986 – August 1987
- Preceded by: Zhou Hui
- Succeeded by: Wang Qun

Governor of Hebei
- In office 28 April 1983 – 4 May 1986
- Preceded by: Liu Bingyan
- Succeeded by: Xie Feng

Personal details
- Born: 1920 Raoyang County, Hebei, China
- Died: 20 November 2002 (aged 82) Shijiazhuang, Hebei, China
- Party: Chinese Communist Party

Zhang Shuguang (Chinese: 张曙光; 1920 – 20 November 2002), born Han Zhihong (韩志洪), also known as Han Jianxun (韩建勋), was a politician of the People's Republic of China. He was the Party Secretary of Inner Mongolia from 1986 to 1987, and the Governor of Hebei from 1982 to 1986.

Zhang was born in Raoyang County, Hebei province. He joined the Chinese Communist Party in February 1938. He also served in Zhaotong prefecture and Wenshan Zhuang and Miao Autonomous Prefecture of Yunnan Province. Zhang died in November 2002 in Shijiazhuang, capital of Hebei.
