= Uliji =

- ᠥᠯᠵᠡᠢ

Chairperson of the Ethnic and Religious Affairs Committee of the Chinese People's Political Consultative Conference
- In office March 1998 – March 2001
- Preceded by: Zhao Puchu
- Succeeded by: Niu Maosheng

Chairman of Inner Mongolia
- In office 1993–1998
- Preceded by: Buhe
- Succeeded by: Yun Bulong

Personal details
- Born: August 1933 Horqin Right Middle Banner, Inner Mongolia, China
- Died: 2 February 2001 (aged 67) Beijing, China
- Party: Chinese Communist Party
- Education: Central Military Commission Engineering School

Chinese name
- Simplified Chinese: 乌力吉
- Traditional Chinese: 烏力吉
Transcriptions
Standard Mandarin
- Hanyu Pinyin: Wūlìjí

Uliji (Mongolian: ᠥᠯᠵᠡᠢ; Өлзий, Ölzí; Chinese: 乌力吉; pinyin: Wūlìjí; August 1933 – February 2, 2001) was an ethnic Mongol politician in the People's Republic of China. He was born in Horqin Right Middle Banner, Inner Mongolia. He was Chairman of Inner Mongolia between 1993 and 1998.

Government offices
Preceded by Buhe	Chairman of Inner Mongolia; 1993–1998	Succeeded by Yun Bulong
Assembly seats
Preceded by Zhao Puchu	Chairperson of the Ethnic and Religious Affairs Committee of the Chinese People's Political Consultative Conference; 1998–2001	Succeeded by Niu Maosheng
