= Chu Bo =

Chinese politician

- 储波

Party Secretary of Inner Mongolia
- In office 15 August 2001 – 30 November 2009
- Deputy: Yang Jing; Uyunqimg
- Preceded by: Liu Mingzu
- Succeeded by: Hu Chunhua

Governor of Hunan
- In office September 1998 – August 2001
- Preceded by: Yang Zhengwu
- Succeeded by: Zhang Yunchuan

Personal details
- Born: October 1944 (age 81) Tongcheng County, Anhui, China
- Party: Chinese Communist Party (since 1969)
- Spouse: Xie Ru
- Education: Peking University

Chu Bo (simplified Chinese: 储波; traditional Chinese: 儲波; pinyin: Chǔ Bō; born October 1944) is a retired Chinese politician. He served as the Party Secretary of Inner Mongolia Region, the top leader of the region, holding position from 2001 to 2009. He also served as Governor of Hunan between 1998 and 2001.

== Biography ==
Chu is a native of Tongcheng, Anhui where he attended the Anhui Province Tongcheng Secondary School. He graduated from the department of hydraulics at Tianjin University in 1967, then joined the Communist Party in 1969. He began work at a chemical factory in Yueyang, Hunan. He rose through the administrative ranks, eventually entering politics, first as vice mayor and deputy party chief of Yueyang, then party chief. In October 1990 he was named a member of the provincial Party Standing Committee of Hunan. In January 1993 he became executive vice governor of Hunan. In 1994, he was named deputy party chief of Hunan province. In October 1998, he was named acting governor of Fujian, confirmed as governor in February 1999.

Chu became the top official of Inner Mongolia in August 2001, taking office as its party secretary, and took on a unique approach to policy. During his tenure, Inner Mongolia's GDP increased at a much higher rate compared to the rest of the country. At its height real GDP growth was measured at 17%. Chu's obsession with GDP growth, however, cost some essential benefits for most of the region's poor. Although his administration gave rise to the slogan, "for economic development, China leads the world, Inner Mongolia leads China", his policies were said to have created a gross wealth imbalance within the region.

In November 2009, Chu, having reached the customary retirement age of 65 for provincial level officials, left his post as party secretary of Inner Mongolia. On December 26, 2009, Chu was named a deputy chair of the National People's Congress Financial and Economic Affairs Committee. He served out one term before retiring from politics.

Chu was an alternate member of the 15th Central Committee of the Chinese Communist Party, and a full member of the 16th and 17th Central Committees.

Government offices
Preceded by Yang Zhengwu	Governor of Hunan; 1998–2001	Succeeded by Zhang Yunchuan
Party political offices
Preceded by Liu Mingzu	Party Secretary of Inner Mongolia; 2001–2009	Succeeded by Hu Chunhua
