= International Journal of Coal Preparation and Utilization =

- Discipline: Energy and Fuels, Geological engineering, Mechanical engineering, Chemical engineering
- Language: English
- Edited by: Barbara J. Arnold

Publication details
- Former name: Coal Preparation
- History: 1984-present
- Publisher: Taylor & Francis, Ltd.
- Frequency: 12/year
- Open access: Hybrid
- Impact factor: 2.0 (2023)

Standard abbreviations
- ISO 4: Int. J. Coal Prep. Util.

Indexing
- ISSN: 1939-2699 (print); 1939-2702 (web)
- LCCN: 2007215041
- OCLC no.: 156915382

Links
- Journal homepage; Online access

The International Journal of Coal Preparation and Utilization is a peer-reviewed scientific journal publishing twelve issues per year. The journal covers coal preparation. The journal was founded in 1984, by Janusz S. Laskowski, who served as editor-in-chief until 2004. The journal was known as Coal Preparation from 1984 to 2007, and the International Journal of Coal Preparation and Utilization from 2008 to the present. The current editor-in-chief is Barbara J. Arnold, a professor of practice in mining engineering from Pennsylvania State University.

== Abstracting and indexing ==
The journal is abstracted and indexed in:

- Science Citation Index Expanded
- Current Contents/Engineering, Computing & Technology
- Ei Compendex
- EBSCO databases
- ProQuest databases
- Scopus
- Inspec
