= Hu Yifeng =

Chinese politician

- 胡毅峰

President of Inner Mongolia Autonomous Region Higher People's Court
- In office January 2011 – January 2018
- Preceded by: Wang Weishan
- Succeeded by: Yang Zongren

Personal details
- Born: May 1954 (age 72) Harqin Banner, Inner Mongolia, China
- Party: Chinese Communist Party
- Education: Baotou Railway Technical School; Inner Mongolia University; Central Party School of the Chinese Communist Party

Hu Yifeng (Chinese: 胡毅峰; pinyin: Hú Yìfēng; born May 1954) is a retired Chinese politician. He was investigated by China's top anti-graft agency in April 2022. Previously he served as president of Inner Mongolia Autonomous Region Higher People's Court. He was a delegate to the 10th and 12th National People's Congress.

== Biography ==
Hu was born in Harqin Banner, Inner Mongolia, in May 1954. During the Cultural Revolution, he worked as a sent-down youth at Yulin People's Commune in the suburb of Hohhot between 1971 and 1973. In October 1973, he entered Baotou Railway Technical School and worked at Hohhot Railway Bureau after graduation in October 1975.

He joined the Chinese Communist Party (CCP) in July 1976. In April 1984, he was assigned to the Organization Department of CCP Inner Mongolia Autonomous Region Committee. He became deputy party secretary of Ulanqab League (now Ulanqab) in June 1992 before being assigned to the similar position in Bayannur League (now Bayannur) in July 1995. He concurrently served as mayor of Bayannur League since April 1998. He was executive deputy secretary of the Inner Mongolia Autonomous Regional Political and Legal Affairs Commission in January 2003, and held that office until January 2008. He became secretary-general of the Standing Committee of the People's Congress of Inner Mongolia Autonomous Region in January 2008, and served until January 2011. In January 2011, he was promoted to be president and party branch secretary of Inner Mongolia Autonomous Region Higher People's Court, concurrently serving as deputy secretary of the Inner Mongolia Autonomous Regional Political and Legal Affairs Commission. He retired in January 2018.

=== Downfall ===
On 22 April 2022, he was put under investigation for alleged "serious violations of discipline and laws" by the Central Commission for Discipline Inspection (CCDI), the party's internal disciplinary body, and the National Supervisory Commission, the highest anti-corruption agency of China. His deputy Jin Zhu (金柱) surrendered himself to the anti-corruption agency of China in October 2021. On November 7, 2022, the Supreme People's Procuratorate signed an arrest order for him for taking bribes. On 24 February 2023, Hu was indicted for bribery.

On 9 January 2024, Hu was sentenced to 14 years in prison for bribery.

Legal offices
Preceded by Wang Weishan (王维山)	President of Inner Mongolia Autonomous Region Higher People's Court; 2011–2018	Succeeded by Yang Zongren
