= Ulanhu =

3rd Vice President of the People's Republic of China

- ᠤᠯᠠᠭᠠᠨᠬᠦᠦ 乌兰夫
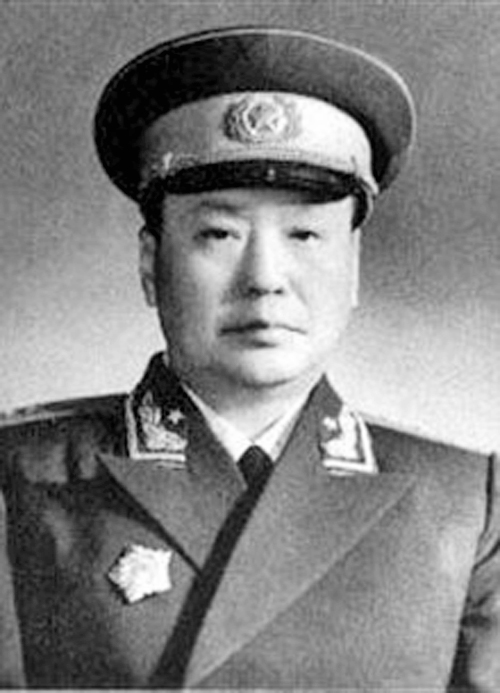
- Ulanhu in 1955

Vice President of China
- In office 15 March 1983 – 15 March 1988
- President: Li Xiannian
- Leader: Deng Xiaoping
- Preceded by: Soong Ching-ling and Dong Biwu (until 1972)
- Succeeded by: Wang Zhen

Head of the United Front Work Department
- In office 2 June 1977 – 26 April 1982
- Preceded by: Li Dazhang
- Succeeded by: Yang Jingren

Personal details
- Born: Yun Ze (云泽); 23 December 1906 Tumed Left Banner, Suiyuan, Qing China (present-day Hohhot, Inner Mongolia, China)
- Died: 8 December 1988 (aged 81) Beijing, China
- Party: Chinese Communist Party
- Spouse: Yun Liren
- Education: Moscow Sun Yat-sen University

Ulanhu

Chinese name
- Traditional Chinese: 烏蘭夫
- Simplified Chinese: 乌兰夫
- Literal meaning: Red son (in Mongolian)
Transcriptions
Standard Mandarin
- Hanyu Pinyin: Wūlánfū

Chinese name
- Traditional Chinese: 雲澤
- Simplified Chinese: 云泽
Transcriptions
Standard Mandarin
- Hanyu Pinyin: Yún Zé

Mongolian name
- Mongolian Cyrillic: Улаанхүү
- Mongolian script: ᠤᠯᠠᠭᠠᠨᠬᠦᠦ
Transcriptions
- SASM/GNC: Ulaγan Hüü

Ulanhu or Ulanfu (Chinese: 乌兰夫; pinyin: Wūlánfū, 23 December 1906 – 8 December 1988), born Yun Ze (Chinese: 云泽), was a Chinese communist politician who was the founding Chairman of China's Inner Mongolia Autonomous Region from 1947 to 1966. An ethnic Tumed Mongol, he took the nom de guerre Ulanhu (lit. 'Red son'). He joined the Chinese Communist Party (CCP) in 1925, studied in the Soviet Union, and played a leading role in bringing Inner Mongolia under communist control after 1945. He was the region's most important leader for two decades and also served as a vice premier. During the Cultural Revolution, he was purged and accused of ruling Inner Mongolia as an "independent kingdom", and the campaign against his alleged followers became part of a pogrom against Mongols in the region. He was rehabilitated in 1973, and he later headed the CCP's United Front Work Department and served as Vice President of China from 1983 to 1988.

Ulanhu was the highest-ranking minority official in the history of the People's Republic of China, and he became an icon of loyalty both to the Mongolian people and to the state. Except for the period of the Cultural Revolution, his family dominated the politics of Inner Mongolia. His son Buhe served as Chairman of Inner Mongolia for a decade, and his granddaughter Bu Xiaolin was appointed to the same position in 2016.

== Early life ==
Ulanhu was born Yun Ze on 23 December 1906 near present-day Hohhot, in what was then Suiyuan. He belonged to the Tumed Mongols and was born into a rich peasant family. Anthropologist Uradyn Bulag has described his identity as a "sinicized 'Mongolness'", and a 1991 report by Asia Watch described him as "a sinicized Mongol who spoke no Mongolian". He was educated at the Mongolian and Tibetan School in Beijing.

== Revolutionary career ==
In 1925, mentored by Li Dazhao, Ulanhu joined the Chinese Communist Party. He then studied at the Moscow Sun Yat-sen University in the Soviet Union. According to the historian Lin Hsiao-ting, his fellow students there included Chiang Ching-kuo, the son of Chiang Kai-shek, and Deng Xiaoping. According to the Encyclopædia Britannica, he was at first committed to the independence of Inner Mongolia from Nationalist-ruled China. After returning to China, he did underground work for the party, fought against the Japanese puppet state of Mengjiang and sought closer relations with the Mongolian People's Republic. He later joined the communist forces at Yan'an. By 1945, he was an alternate member of the CCP's Central Committee.

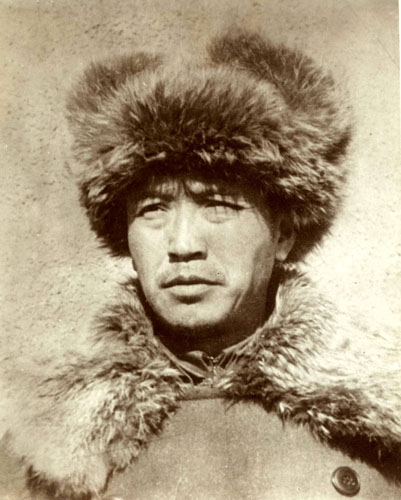
Ulanhu during his days as a Communist revolutionary

== Autonomy movement and civil war ==
After the Soviet Union and Mongolia declared war on Japan in August 1945, Ulanhu played a major part in securing communist control of Inner Mongolia, and he set up the Association of the Inner Mongolia Autonomous Movement. In eastern Inner Mongolia, the main rival figure was Hafenga, whom Bulag describes as "the most popular, left-leaning, leader of the eastern Mongols", and who had once served in the Manchukuo embassy in Tokyo. Ulanhu opposed the Inner Mongolian People's Revolutionary Party, a rival ethnic party. The historian Xiaoyuan Liu writes that the eastern Mongols' campaign for territorial autonomy in late 1945 pressed the CCP to accept autonomy in exchange for Mongol cooperation against the Kuomintang. A meeting between Ulanhu and Hafenga on 3 April 1946 is celebrated in the historiography of modern Inner Mongolia as the first success in uniting its eastern and western parts.

According to Bulag, Ulanhu eventually prevailed in these disputes, and in May 1947, the Inner Mongolia Autonomous Government was founded in eastern Inner Mongolia, with Ulanhu as its chairman and military commander. During the land reform of 1947 and 1948, he applied the principle of "land to the tillers" in farming areas and "livestock to the herders" in pastoral areas. At a meeting of senior cadres in Harbin in 1948, he pressed for a policy known as the "Three Nos and Two Benefits", which meant "no property distribution, no class labelling, and no class struggle" in pastoral areas. The same year, he declared that herders in all banners and leagues had free grazing rights, which became official policy for China's pastoral regions, according to the scholar Peter Ho. After 1949, the CCP extended the Three Nos policy to other minority pastoral regions.

== Leader of Inner Mongolia ==
After the communist victory in 1949, Ulanhu held a series of posts in the central government while remaining the dominant figure in Inner Mongolia. The sinologist Kerry Brown writes that he balanced local Mongolian interests against the demands of the central government, and that he led land reform in the region in the 1950s. By November 1954, he was a vice premier, and that month he led a CCP delegation to the 12th Congress of the Mongolian People's Revolutionary Party in Ulaanbaatar. During the visit, he told Prime Minister Yumjaagiin Tsedenbal that China had agreed to supply workers for Mongolian enterprises. In September 1955, he was awarded the rank of general (shangjiang), becoming one of the 57 "founding generals" of the People's Republic, and he received the first-class Order of Liberation.

Asia Watch wrote that moderate policies prevailed in the region under Ulanhu's leadership, at least until the Great Leap Forward. It also argued that Mongolian officials in the region "could not do anything before asking Beijing for instructions", and that their status was no different from that of officials in China's inland provinces. During the Great Leap Forward, Ulanhu delayed de facto communization in Mongol pastoral areas. Traditional forms of herd management remained until 1965, when herds were communized shortly before the Cultural Revolution. In 1963, his government doubled the size of the private plots of the Tumed Mongols to offset their poverty.

== Cultural Revolution ==
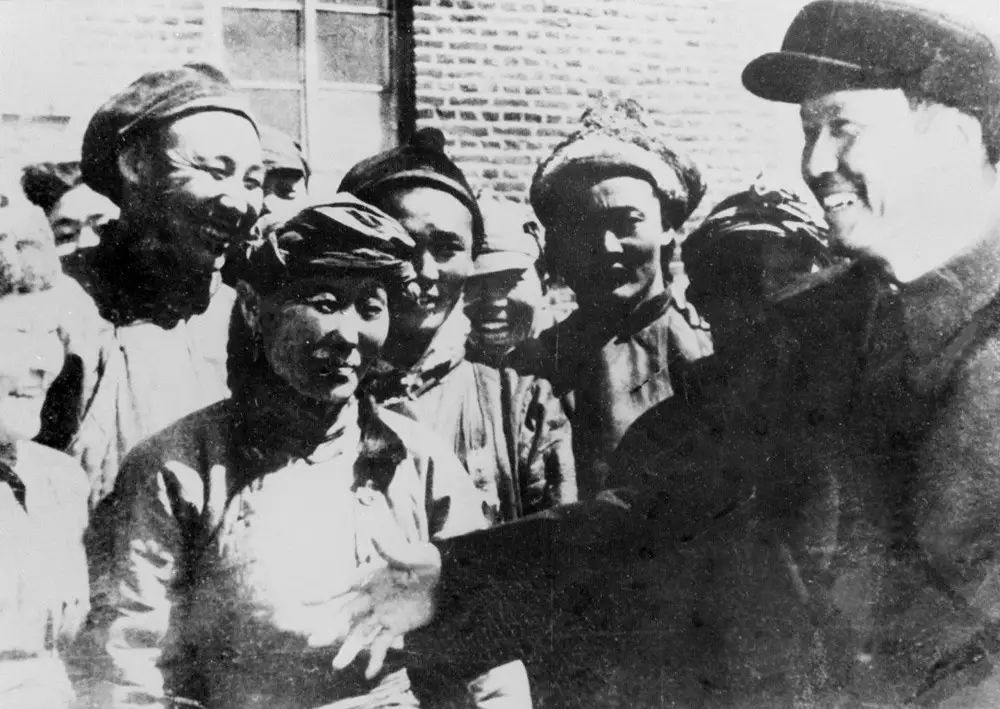
Ulanhu and the delegates of Inner Mongolia People's Congress.

During the Four Cleanups campaign of the mid-1960s, Chinese critics treated the Tumed Mongols' extra land as a class privilege, and relatives of Ulanhu's wife were labelled landlords or rich peasants. Bulag writes that Ulanhu objected to extending class struggle to ethnic relations, a direction that "threatened his political survival". Some Chinese officials had already accused him of personal territorial ambitions, and in 1965 he responded by reprinting and widely circulating Mao Zedong's 1935 declaration on Inner Mongolia to defend the region's autonomy.

After the start of the Cultural Revolution, Ulanhu was summoned to Beijing in the summer of 1966 for a meeting at the Qianmen Hotel that lasted more than two months, where central leaders, including Deng Xiaoping, denounced him for "anti-Party activities". He was removed from his party and government posts. He was accused of "ruling Inner Mongolia like an independent kingdom". His critics also called him a splittist and a counter-revolutionary, accused him of collusion with Soviet "revisionists", and later labelled him a "modern day Genghis Khan". The campaign against him extended to his family and associates. Paul Hyer and William Heaton wrote in 1968 that relations between Beijing and Ulaanbaatar had "deteriorated rapidly, particularly after the purge of Ulanfu".

In April 1967, Beijing placed Inner Mongolia under Teng Haiqing, a Han Chinese general, who led attacks on an alleged underground Inner Mongolian People's Party. In 1968, a campaign was launched to "unearth Ulanfu's sinister line and liquidate Ulanfu's pernicious influence". According to TJ Cheng, Bulag and Mark Selden, the pogrom that followed killed more than 16,000 Mongols. Brown notes that official statistics recorded more than 22,000 deaths and 300,000 injuries in the region during the Cultural Revolution, and that demographic studies suggest that the true death toll may have been about 100,000. In 1969, the territory of the autonomous region was reduced, and it was not restored until 1979. The anthropologist David Sneath has examined the impact of the Cultural Revolution on the Mongols of Inner Mongolia with a focus on Ulanhu's fall from power. In 1979, a party statement declared that "the Inner Mongolian People's Party never existed" and blamed the purge on the Gang of Four and Lin Biao.

== Rehabilitation and later career ==
Ulanhu was rehabilitated in 1973. He then served on the party's Central Committee and Politburo, and from 1975 he was one of the vice-chairmen of the National People's Congress. In 1977, he became head of the United Front Work Department. In this role, he contributed to the political rehabilitation of people linked to the department's policies before the Cultural Revolution, such as Li Weihan.

In June 1983, the National People's Congress elected Ulanhu as Vice President of China. He served one term under President Li Xiannian, from 1983 to 1988. After his term as vice president ended, he was elected a vice-chairman of the National People's Congress.

== Death and legacy ==
Ulanhu died in Beijing on 8 December 1988. His obituary in the People's Daily described him as a "distinguished worker and servant of the Party", according to Brown. In an article marking the anniversary of his death, Xi Zhongxun described Ulanhu as his "closest comrade in arms" and stated that his death was "a major, irreparable loss for the party and for the nation". In 1992, the Ulanhu Memorial Hall was opened to the public in Hohhot. His Selected Works were published in 1999 with a title inscribed by Jiang Zemin, the General Secretary of the Chinese Communist Party.

Ulanhu was the highest-ranking minority official in the history of the People's Republic, and he became an icon of loyalty both to the Mongols and to the state. Except during the Cultural Revolution, his family dominated the politics of Inner Mongolia. He has also been the subject of a posthumous cult in Inner Mongolia, which Bulag examines in The Mongols at China's Edge as a window on the "Mongol problem" in China. The Encyclopædia Britannica describes him as a "Mongol nationalist and Chinese politician who promoted Mongolian rights throughout his life". Cheng, Bulag and Selden describe the pre-1966 leadership of the region as "a savvy and stable Mongol-centered leadership under the veteran Communist Ulanhu". According to the scholar James Leibold, many of the region's powerful Mongolian officials have been "directly or indirectly linked to Ulanhu and his large extended family", which is known in Chinese as the Yun clan.

== Family ==
Ulanhu's first wife, Yun Ting (1900–1975), was a Mongol from Taiji village in Togtoh County, and they married in 1920. According to the party organisation department of Togtoh County, she helped him with his underground work, joined the CCP in 1945 and was persecuted during the Cultural Revolution, and she died in May 1975. The couple had a daughter, Yun Shubi, and three sons, Buhe, Wukeli and Wu Jie. His second wife, Yun Liren (January 1922 – October 1995), was a Mongol from Tumed Banner who oversaw the compilation of his collected writings, his memoirs and his biography.

Buhe served as Chairman of Inner Mongolia from 1982 to 1993. Buhe's daughter, Bu Xiaolin, was appointed Chairwoman of Inner Mongolia in March 2016, making her the third generation of Ulanhu's family to hold the position. Leibold has described her as "the lauded Mongolian granddaughter of Ulanhu".

== See also ==
- List of officers of the People's Liberation Army
- Inner Mongolian People's Republic
- Inner Mongolia incident

Government offices
| Vacant Title last held by Soong Ching-ling and Dong Biwu | Vice President of China; 1983–1988 | Succeeded by Wang Zhen |
| Preceded by Li Weihan | Minister in charge of the State Ethnic Affairs Commission; 1954–1975 | Succeeded by Ismail Amat |
| New office | Chairman of Inner Mongolia; 1947–1966 | Succeeded by Teng Haiqing |
Party political offices
| New office | Secretary of the CCP Inner Mongolia Committee; 1947–1966 | Succeeded by Xie Xuegong |
| Preceded by Li Dazhang | Head of the United Front Work Department; 1977–1982 | Succeeded by Yang Jingren |
