= Wang Qun (politician, born 1926) =

Chinese politician

- 王群

Party Secretary of Inner Mongolia
- In office August 1987 – August 1994
- Preceded by: Zhang Shuguang
- Succeeded by: Liu Mingzu

Personal details
- Born: September 1926 Xinzhou, Hubei, China
- Died: 12 December 2017 (aged 91) Wuhan, Hubei, China
- Party: Chinese Communist Party

Wang Qun (Chinese: 王群; September 1926 – 12 December 2017) was a Chinese politician who served as Party Secretary of Inner Mongolia from 1987 to 1994, and Party Chief of Wuhan from 1978 to 1987.

== Biography ==
Wang Qun was born in September 1926 in Xinzhou County, Hubei Province. He joined the Chinese Communist Party (CCP) in August 1944 and participated in the Chinese Civil War.

After the founding of the People's Republic of China in 1949, he worked in the Hubei Military District, as well as local governments in Hubei Province. He served as Communist Party Secretary of Xiangyang County from 1957 to 1969, First Party Secretary of Yichang Prefecture from 1969 to 1978, and First Party Secretary of the provincial capital Wuhan from 1978 to 1987.

In August 1987, Wang was appointed Communist Party Secretary of Inner Mongolia Autonomous Region, and served in the position until August 1994. From May 1993 to December 1996 he also served as Chairman of the Inner Mongolia Regional People's Congress.

Wang was an alternate member of the 12th Central Committee of the Chinese Communist Party, and a full member of the 13th and the 14th Central Committees.

Wang Qun died in Wuhan on 12 December 2017, aged 91.
