= Liu Mingzu =

Chinese politician

- 刘明祖

Chairperson of the National People's Congress Agriculture and Rural Affairs Committee
- In office March 2003 – March 2008
- Preceded by: Gao Dezhan
- Succeeded by: Wang Yunlong

Party Secretary of Inner Mongolia
- In office August 1994 – August 2001
- Preceded by: Wang Qun
- Succeeded by: Chu Bo

Chairperson of Inner Mongolia Regional People's Congress
- In office January 1997 – January 2003
- Preceded by: Wang Qun
- Succeeded by: Chu Bo

Chairperson of Guangxi Regional People's Congress
- In office January 1993 – January 1995
- Preceded by: Gan Ku
- Succeeded by: Zhao Fulin

Personal details
- Born: September 1936 Weihai, Shandong, China
- Died: 28 December 2022 (aged 86) Weihai, Shandong, China
- Party: Chinese Communist Party

Chinese name
- Simplified Chinese: 刘明祖
- Traditional Chinese: 劉明祖
Transcriptions
Standard Mandarin
- Hanyu Pinyin: Liú Míngzǔ

Liu Mingzu (Chinese: 刘明祖; pinyin: Liú Míngzǔ; September 1936 – 28 December 2022) was a regional Chinese politician. He served as the Party Secretary of Inner Mongolia, therefore the top leader of the region, from 1994 to 2001, and before that, the deputy party chief of Guangxi, also an autonomous region.

Liu was born in the rural outskirts of Weihai, Shandong province, in what is present-day Huancui District; he went to Dalian with his mother to reunite with his father there. Liu joined the Chinese Communist Party in 1959, and spent his early career in various incarnations of the Weihai municipal office before, during, and after the Cultural Revolution. In 1986 he was named prefecture party chief of Linyi, Shandong. In 1988 he was transferred to become deputy party chief of Guangxi, then in 1993 also became chair of the regional People's Congress. He was then transferred to Inner Mongolia. After his retirement from active 'frontline' politics, he was named chair of the National People's Congress Agriculture and Rural Affairs Committee in 2003, where he served one term, before leaving politics for good.

Liu was an alternate member of the 14th Central Committee of the Chinese Communist Party and a full member of the 15th Central Committee.

He died on December 28, 2022, at the age of 86 in Weihai, Shandong Province after a long illness.

Assembly seats
Preceded by Gan Ku	Chairperson of Guangxi Regional People's Congress; 1993–1995	Succeeded by Zhao Fulin
Preceded by Wang Qun	Chairperson of Inner Mongolia Regional People's Congress; 1997–2003	Succeeded by Chu Bo
Preceded by Gao Dezhan	Chairperson of the National People's Congress Agriculture and Rural Affairs Committee; 2003–2008	Succeeded by Wang Yunlong
Party political offices
Preceded by Wang Qun	Party Secretary of Inner Mongolia; 1994–2001	Succeeded by Chu Bo
