= Uyunqimg =

Chinese politician (1942–2024)

- 乌云其木格 ᠣᠶᠤᠨᠴᠢᠮᠡᠭ

8th Chairwoman of Inner Mongolia
- In office August 2000 – April 2003; Acting until February 2001
- Preceded by: Yun Bulong
- Succeeded by: Yang Jing

Personal details
- Born: December 1942 Jinzhou Province, Manchukuo
- Died: 30 April 2024 (aged 81) Beijing, China
- Citizenship: People's Republic of China
- Party: Chinese Communist Party

Uyunqimg or Oyunchimeg/Oyunqemag (Chinese: 乌云其木格; pinyin: Wūyúnqímùgé, Mongolian: ᠣᠶᠤᠨᠴᠢᠮᠡᠭ, Оюунчимэг, romanized: Oyuunchimeg, Mongolian pronunciation: [ɔjuːnt͡ʃimək]; December 1942 – 30 April 2024) was a Chinese politician of Mongol ethnicity. Between 2008 and 2013, she served as a vice chairperson of the Standing Committee of the 10th and 11th National People's Congress, the national legislature. Between 2000 and 2003 Uyunqimg served as Chairwoman of Inner Mongolia. She is the highest-ranked woman of ethnic minority background to have served in the Chinese government in the history of the People's Republic.

== Biography ==
Originally from Beipiao, Liaoning, she entered the workforce in August 1964, and became a member of the Chinese Communist Party in July 1966. She graduated from Inner Mongolia University of Science and Technology in 1960 and Inner Mongolia Communist Party School in 1964.

Uyunqimg rose to prominence in Inner Mongolia Autonomous Region. In August 2000 she became the Vice party chief of the Inner Mongolian CPC Committee, and the vice chairwoman and acting chairwoman of the Inner Mongolia Autonomous Region, the first woman to take the position, and the second woman in the history of the People's Republic to become a provincial-level head of government (after Gu Xiulian). From 2001 to April 2003, she served as the chairwoman of the Inner Mongolia Autonomous Region. At the 2003 National People's Congress session held in March, she became a vice-chair of its standing committee, the body which acts as a day-to-day legislative body when the NPC is not in session.

Uyunqimg died in Beijing on 30 April 2024, at the age of 81.

Government offices
Preceded by Yun Bulong	Chairwoman of Inner Mongolia; 2001–2003	Succeeded by Yang Jing
