= Taiyuan University of Technology =

Public university in Shanxi, China

- 太原理工大学
- Motto: 求实 创新
- Motto in English: Pursue Practicality, Create Originality
- Type: Public
- Established: 1902; 124 years ago
- President: Huang Qingxue (黄庆学)
- Faculty: 3,549 (June 2022)
- Students: 40,311 (June 2022)
- Undergraduates: 30,960 (June 2022)
- Postgraduates: 7,017 (June 2022)
- Doctoral students: 762 (June 2022)
- Location: Taiyuan, Shanxi, China; 37.8600°N 112.5229°E
- Website: tyut.edu.cn

Chinese name
- Simplified Chinese: 太原理工大学
- Traditional Chinese: 太原理工大學
Transcriptions
Standard Mandarin
- Hanyu Pinyin: Tàiyuán Lǐgōng Dàxué

The Taiyuan University of Technology (太原理工大学; TYUT) is a provincial public science and engineering university in Taiyuan, Shanxi, China. It is affiliated with the Province of Shanxi and funded by the Shanxi Provincial People's Government. The university is part of Project 211 and the Double First-Class Construction.

== History ==
Taiyuan University of Technology can have its history traced all the way back to Western Learning School of National Shanxi Grand Academy, which was established in 1902 as one of the earliest universities in china. With the history of 100 years, it is now a general university, which is majored in engineering, conjoined by engineering and sciences, and harmonized with many other disciplines.

== Faculty ==
Taiyuan University of Technology consists of 23 colleges offering 84 undergraduate disciplines, 34 master's degree programs, 15 doctorate programs and 13 post-doctor research centers. At present, there are over 30 thousand undergraduates, 7,779 master's and Ph.D. students studying at the university.

Three national key disciplines, 13 provincial key disciplines and 12 provincial supported disciplines play a leading role in the scientific research in the university.

TYUT currently has 3549 teaching and administrative staffs including 2178 full-time teachers, 3 academicians of Chinese Academy of Engineering, 1 academician of Chinese Academy of Sciences, 244 doctoral supervisors and 1254 teachers with senior professional and technical titles.

== Publications ==
The publications of this university include: "Journal of Taiyuan University of Technology", "Taiyuan University of Technology Paper", "Coal Conversion", "Journal of Systematic Dialectics", "Journal of Social Science" and "Shanxi Coal".

With "Pursue Practicality, Create Originality, Serve Locality" as its policy, this university has contributed to the country and society over 100 thousand qualified graduates. In 2004, the Ministry of Education honored the university "Excellent University for Undergraduate Education".

== Research ==
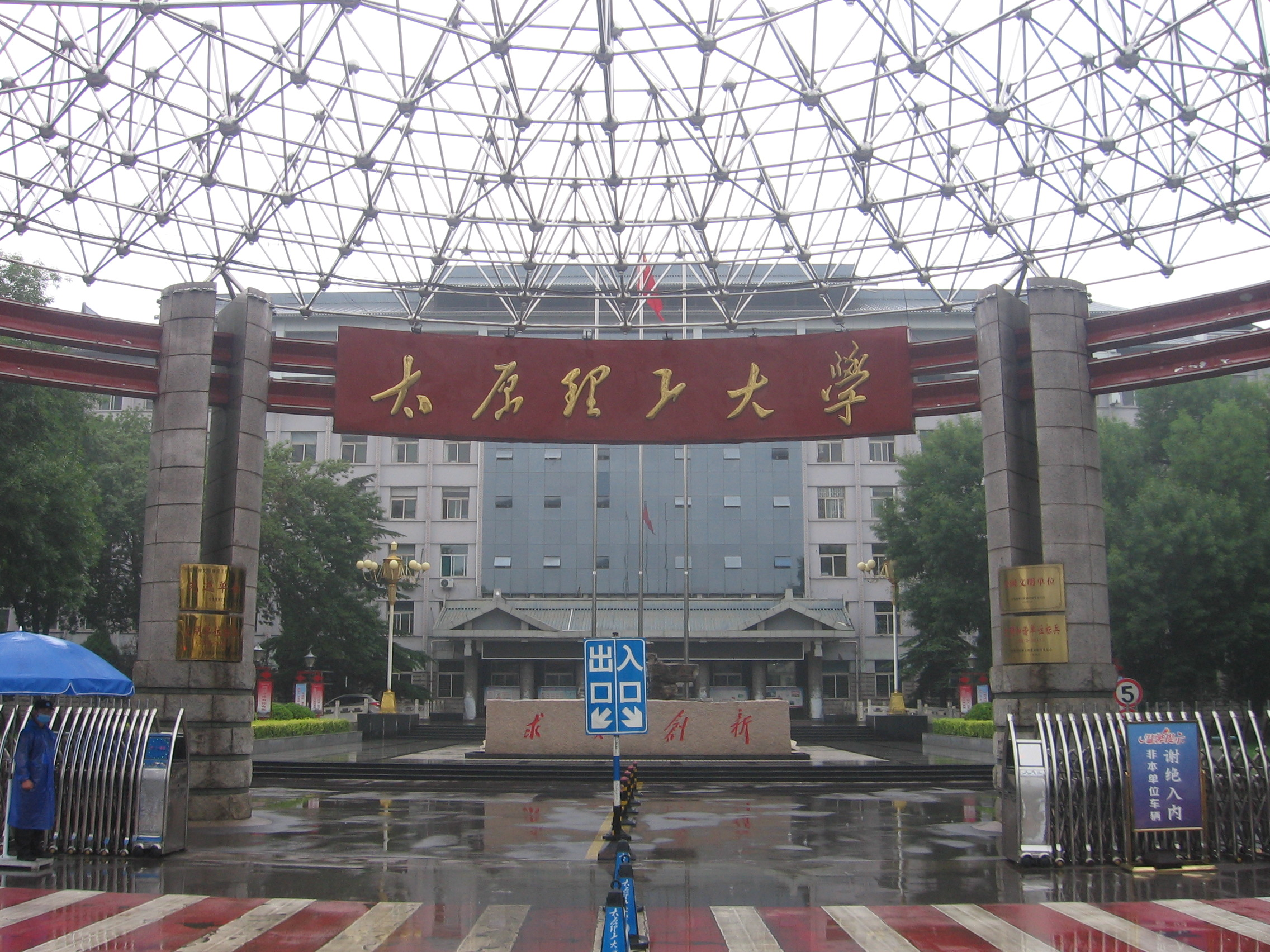
Main Entrance of Yingxi Campus

Taiyuan University of Technology is both solid in its scientific research and technological development and motivated in basic applied research. This university has continuously twice undertaken the national "973" Research Project as the first scientist unit and undertook the national "863" High-Tech Project. 434 prizes from different ministries or the province were respectively awarded to this university.

Dou Yinke, a young teacher from this university was selected to work in the Chinese 21st scientific investigation in Antarctica. Tiancheng. Scien-tech Cooperation Ltd of Taiyuan University of Technology is the only university company in the province that went public.

== International cooperation ==
Over 30 universities from dozens of countries, such as the United States, Japan, the United Kingdom, Australia, Canada, Russia, Germany, France, India and Norway have established partnership with Taiyuan University of Technology. Dozens of universities from Taiwan, Hong Kong and the mainland have well cooperated with this university in the areas of education and research.
