= Teng Haiqing =

Chinese military officer and politician (1909–1997)

- 滕海清
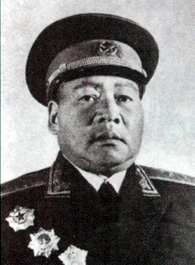
- Teng in 1955
- Born: March 2, 1909; Jinzhai County, Anhui
- Died: October 26, 1997 (aged 88)
- Military career
- Allegiance: China
- Branch: People's Liberation Army
- Rank: Lieutenant general
- Known for: Involvement in the Inner Mongolia incident

Teng Haiqing (Chinese: 滕海清) (March 2, 1909 – October 26, 1997) was a Chinese military officer and a politician. He was in charge of the massive purge in the Inner Mongolia incident.

== Biography ==
Teng was born in Jinzhai County, Anhui province, China. He was a People's Liberation Army lieutenant general and People's Republic of China politician. He was a member of the Chinese Communist Party, and was the CCP Committee Secretary and Chairman of Inner Mongolia.

In 1967, Teng was involved in the Inner Mongolia incident.

Preceded by Xie Xuegong	Communist Party Chief of Inner Mongolia	Succeeded by Zheng Weishan
Preceded by Ulanhu	Chairman of Inner Mongolia; 1966	Succeeded by You Taizhong
