= Kong Fei =

Chinese politician (1911–1993)

- 孔飞
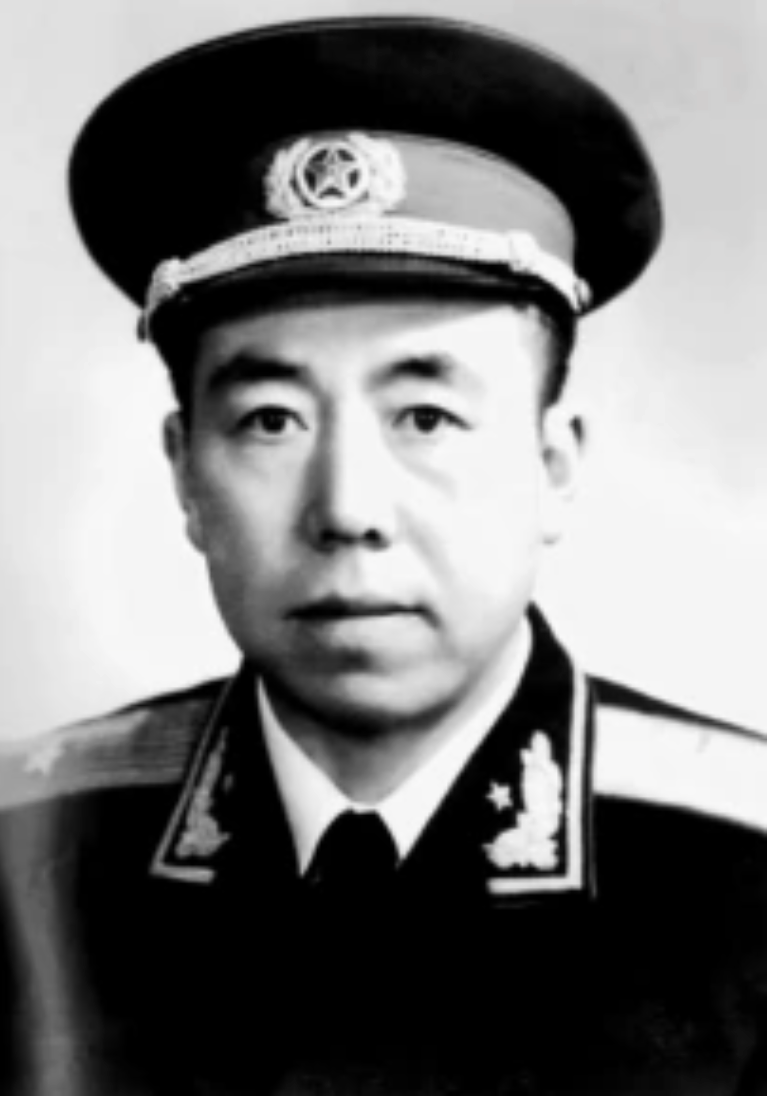
- Born: 1911
- Died: 1993 (aged 81–82)

Kong Fei (Chinese: 孔飞; November 1911 – January 23, 1993) was a Chinese military officer and government official of Mongolian ethnicity.

He served as the Chairman of the Inner Mongolia Autonomous Region in China from 1978 to 1982.

== Military and Political Career ==
Kong Fei joined the Chinese Communist Party in 1936. In 1938, he enlisted in the Eighth Route Army. In 1948, he was made commander of the 10th Cavalry Division of the Inner Mongolia People's Liberation Army.

In 1955, Kong Fei was awarded the rank of Major General. In 1988, he was awarded the First Class Red Star Medal of Honor.

After the founding of the People's Republic of China, Kong Fei served in various roles including Commander and Political Commissar of the Xing'an League Military district of the Inner Mongolia Military Region, Chief of Staff and Deputy Commander of the Inner Mongolia Military Region, Secretary of the Inner Mongolia Autonomous Region Committee of the CCP, and Chairman of the Inner Mongolia Autonomous Region.

Kong Fei later served as an alternate delegate to 12th National Congress and as a standing member of the 6th and 7th National Committees of the Chinese People's Political Consultative Conference.
