= Tumed Left Banner =

Tumed Left Banner 土默特左旗 • ᠲᠦᠮᠡᠳ ᠵᠡᠭᠦᠨ ᠬᠣᠰᠢᠭᠤ
- Banner
- Location in Inner Mongolia Tumed Left Banner (China)
- Coordinates: 40°44′N 111°10′E
- Country: China
- Autonomous region: Inner Mongolia
- Prefecture-level city: Hohhot
- Banner seat: Qasq

Area
  - Total: 2,776 km^{2} (1,072 sq mi)
- Elevation: 1,046 m (3,432 ft)

Population (2020)
  - Total: 263,131
  - Density: 94.79/km^{2} (245.5/sq mi)
- Time zone: UTC+8 (China Standard)
- Website: www.tmtzq.gov.cn

Tumed Left Banner

Chinese name
- Chinese: 土默特左旗
Transcriptions
Standard Mandarin
- Hanyu Pinyin: Tǔmòtè Zuǒqí

Mongolian name
- Mongolian Cyrillic: Түмэд зүүн хошуу
- Mongolian script: ᠲᠦᠮᠡᠳ ᠵᠡᠭᠦᠨ ᠬᠣᠰᠢᠭᠤ
Transcriptions
- SASM/GNC: Tümed Jegün qosiɣu

Tumed Left Banner (Mongolian: ᠲᠦᠮᠡᠳ ᠵᠡᠭᠦᠨ ᠬᠣᠰᠢᠭᠤ; Chinese: 土默特左旗) is a banner (a county-level division) in Hohhot, Inner Mongolia Autonomous Region, North China. It is under the administration of the prefecture-level city of Hohhot, the capital of the autonomous region, and is some distance to the east-northeast.

== Administrative divisions ==
Tumed Left Banner is made up of 7 towns and 2 townships.

Name	Simplified Chinese	Hanyu Pinyin	Mongolian (Hudum Script)	Mongolian (Cyrillic)	Administrative division code
Towns
Qasq Town	察素齐镇	Chásùqí Zhèn	ᠴᠠᠭᠠᠰᠤᠴᠢ ᠪᠠᠯᠭᠠᠰᠤ	Цаасч балгас	150121100
Biqeq Town	毕克齐镇	Bìkèqí Zhèn	ᠪᠢᠴᠢᠭᠡᠴᠢ ᠪᠠᠯᠭᠠᠰᠤ	Бичээч балгас	150121101
Xangd Town	善岱镇	Shàndài Zhèn	ᠱᠠᠩᠳᠠ ᠪᠠᠯᠭᠠᠰᠤ	Шанд балгас	150121102
Taig Mod Town	台阁牧镇	Táigémù Zhèn	ᠲᠠᠢᠭ᠎ᠠ ᠮᠣᠳᠣ ᠪᠠᠯᠭᠠᠰᠤ	Тайга мод балгас	150121103
Baimiaozi Town	白庙子镇	Báimiàozi Zhèn	ᠪᠠᠢ ᠮᠢᠶᠣᠤ ᠽᠢ ᠪᠠᠯᠭᠠᠰᠤ	Бай мяо зи балгас	150121104
Salqin Town	沙尔沁镇	Shā'ěrqìn Zhèn	ᠰᠠᠭᠠᠯᠢᠴᠢᠨ ᠪᠠᠯᠭᠠᠰᠤ	Саальчин балгас	150121105
Qelger Tal Town	敕勒川镇	Chìlèchuān Zhèn	ᠴᠡᠯᠡᠭᠡᠷ ᠲᠠᠯ᠎ᠠ ᠪᠠᠯᠭᠠᠰᠤ	Цэлгэр тал балгас	150121106
Townships
Beishizhou Township	北什轴乡	Běishízhóu Xiāng	ᠪᠧᠢ ᠱᠢ ᠵᠧᠦ ᠰᠢᠶᠠᠩ	Бей ши жүү шиян	150121207
Taban Sain Township	塔布赛乡	Tǎbùsài Xiāng	ᠲᠠᠪᠠᠨᠰᠠᠢᠨ ᠰᠢᠶᠠᠩ	Давансайн шиян	150121208

Other:

- Jinshan Economic-Technological Development Area (金山经济技术开发区, ᠵᠢᠨ ᠱᠠᠨ ᠠᠵᠤ ᠠᠬᠤᠢ ᠶᠢᠨ ᠮᠡᠷᠭᠡᠵᠢᠯ ᠦᠨ ᠨᠡᠭᠡᠭᠡᠯᠲᠡ ᠶᠢᠨ ᠲᠣᠭᠣᠷᠢᠭ)

== Transport ==
=== Metro ===
Tumed Left Banner is currently served by one line and one station of the Hohhot Metro.

1 - Yili Health Valley

== Climate ==
Climate data for Tumed Left Banner, elevation 1,043 m (3,422 ft), (1991–2020 normals, extremes 1981–2010)
Month	Jan	Feb	Mar	Apr	May	Jun	Jul	Aug	Sep	Oct	Nov	Dec	Year
Record high °C (°F)	7.2 (45.0)	16.8 (62.2)	24.9 (76.8)	34.1 (93.4)	35.7 (96.3)	38.7 (101.7)	37.9 (100.2)	34.6 (94.3)	33.0 (91.4)	27.5 (81.5)	17.4 (63.3)	10.3 (50.5)	38.7 (101.7)
Mean daily maximum °C (°F)	−4.4 (24.1)	1.4 (34.5)	9.1 (48.4)	17.8 (64.0)	24.1 (75.4)	28.2 (82.8)	29.3 (84.7)	27.3 (81.1)	22.5 (72.5)	15.2 (59.4)	5.3 (41.5)	−2.6 (27.3)	14.4 (58.0)
Daily mean °C (°F)	−11.0 (12.2)	−5.5 (22.1)	2.2 (36.0)	10.6 (51.1)	17.2 (63.0)	21.8 (71.2)	23.4 (74.1)	21.3 (70.3)	15.8 (60.4)	8.2 (46.8)	−0.9 (30.4)	−8.7 (16.3)	7.9 (46.2)
Mean daily minimum °C (°F)	−16.4 (2.5)	−11.3 (11.7)	−3.9 (25.0)	3.4 (38.1)	9.9 (49.8)	15.0 (59.0)	17.5 (63.5)	15.5 (59.9)	9.7 (49.5)	2.3 (36.1)	−5.8 (21.6)	−13.6 (7.5)	1.9 (35.4)
Record low °C (°F)	−28.5 (−19.3)	−25.2 (−13.4)	−20.2 (−4.4)	−7.9 (17.8)	−1.7 (28.9)	2.3 (36.1)	9.4 (48.9)	5.6 (42.1)	−1.6 (29.1)	−8.9 (16.0)	−24.1 (−11.4)	−30.4 (−22.7)	−30.4 (−22.7)
Average precipitation mm (inches)	1.9 (0.07)	4.3 (0.17)	10.4 (0.41)	12.3 (0.48)	30.4 (1.20)	49.2 (1.94)	106.2 (4.18)	89.9 (3.54)	59.8 (2.35)	20.2 (0.80)	8.7 (0.34)	3.0 (0.12)	396.3 (15.6)
Average precipitation days (≥ 0.1 mm)	1.6	2.1	3.2	3.4	6.4	9.7	11.9	11.3	9.1	4.3	2.6	1.8	67.4
Average snowy days	3.1	3.3	2.7	0.7	0	0	0	0	0	0.2	2.6	3.2	15.8
Average relative humidity (%)	57	48	41	34	36	46	61	65	61	55	57	57	52
Mean monthly sunshine hours	198.6	208.8	252.4	270.6	285.3	260.8	242.6	244.7	222.2	226.6	194.9	184.3	2,791.8
Percentage possible sunshine	66	69	68	67	64	58	54	58	60	67	66	64	63
Source: China Meteorological Administration

== See also ==
- Hanggai (village)
