= Central Foreign Affairs Commission =

Chinese Communist Party body

- 中央外事工作委员会
- Emblem of the Chinese Communist Party

Agency overview
- Formed: 1981; 45 years ago
- Type: Supra-ministerial policy coordination and consultation body
- Jurisdiction: Chinese Communist Party
- Headquarters: Beijing
- Agency executives: Xi Jinping, Leader; Li Qiang, Deputy Leader; Wang Yi, Office Director
- Parent agency: Central Committee of the Chinese Communist Party
- Child agency: Office

Chinese name
- Simplified Chinese: 中央外事工作委员会
Transcriptions
Standard Mandarin
- Hanyu Pinyin: Zhōngyāng Wàishì Gōngzuò Wěiyuánhuì

The Central Foreign Affairs Commission is a commission of the Central Committee of the Chinese Communist Party (CCP) that exercises general oversight on matters related to foreign affairs.

The group was first established as the Central Foreign Affairs Leading Group (FALG) in 1958. Disbanded during the Cultural Revolution, it was restored by Deng Xiaoping in 1981. The FALG was upgraded to the Central Foreign Affairs Commission in March 2018. The main execution body of the commission is the General Office, with the director of the Office being China's top diplomat, currently Wang Yi. Since 1993, the group has been led by the general secretary of the Chinese Communist Party and the premier has served as the deputy leader of the group. It is currently chaired by CCP general secretary Xi Jinping, with premier Li Qiang as its deputy leader.

== History ==
The Central Foreign Affairs Leading Group, also called the Central Foreign Affairs Leadership Small Group (FALG or FALSG; Chinese: 中央外事工作领导小组; pinyin: Zhōngyāng Wàishì Gōngzuò Lǐngdǎo Xiǎozǔ), was first established in March 1958. It was disbanded during the Cultural Revolution and restored in 1981 as Deng Xiaoping increased the number of stakeholders involved in the development of foreign policy. The group has historically been a semi-institutional foreign policy coordination body, and became a forum for the central leadership in charge of foreign policy to meet regularly with top bureaucrats to discuss priorities, achieve consensus, and prepare recommendations for the Politburo. It was the only standing foreign policy coordination body until the aftermath of the United States bombing of the Chinese embassy in Belgrade, which prompted the creation of the Central National Security Leadership Small Group (NSLSG) in 2000 to coordinate national security crisis response.

In March 2018, the leading group was upgraded to the Central Foreign Affairs Commission as part of the deepening the reform of the Party and state institutions. It also was put in charge of maritime rights and interests following the disestablishment of the Central Leading Group for Safeguarding Maritime Rights and Interests.

== Functions ==
The commission is the top CCP institution dedicated to China's foreign affairs. Through the commission, the CCP leadership makes decisions, assigns responsibilities and oversees implementation on a broad range of foreign-related activities. The policies handled by the commission include traditional diplomacy, party-to-party diplomacy, external propaganda, external trade, intelligence activities overseas, counterespionage, and internal aspects of Hong Kong, Macau and Taiwan affairs. The meetings of the commission are rarely publicized. The Foreign Relations Law of the People's Republic of China states that the commission is "responsible for policy making, deliberation and coordination relating to the conduct of foreign relations". The law further states that the commission "considers and formulates the State's foreign relations strategy and related major principles and policies, and provides guidance for their implementation" and that it is "responsible for top-level design, coordination and holistic advancement of work concerning foreign relations, and supervises its implementation".

The Office of the Central Foreign Affairs Commission is its administrative agency, operating secretively like its parent body. The Office is responsible for executing and coordinating the implementation of the decisions and directives of the commission. It additionally conducts research and makes suggestions on international relations, drafts and oversees foreign-related laws and regulations, handles foreign-related inquiries from Party, state and local bodies, and organizes work on maritime rights and interests. Though the office itself is a ministerial-level institution, the director of the Office has been a member of the Politburo and at the deputy national-level leader. Generally, the director has greater authority than the Minister of Foreign Affairs. The director of the commission's Office, currently Wang Yi, is the top diplomat of the People's Republic of China.

== Membership ==
The membership of the commission generally consists of China's national leaders, including the CCP general secretary, the premier, the vice president, heads of the International Department and Central Propaganda Department, the director of the State Council Information Office, the Minister of Foreign Affairs, the Minister of National Defense, the Minister of Public Security, the Minister of State Security, the Minister of Commerce, and heads of CCP and state agencies related to Taiwan, Hong Kong, Macau, and overseas Chinese.

=== Leadership ===
1. Li Xiannian (1981–1988), CCP Vice Chairman, President
2. Li Peng (1988–1993), Premier
3. Jiang Zemin (1993–2003), CCP General Secretary and President
4. Hu Jintao (2003–2013), CCP General Secretary and President
5. Xi Jinping (2013–present), CCP General Secretary and President

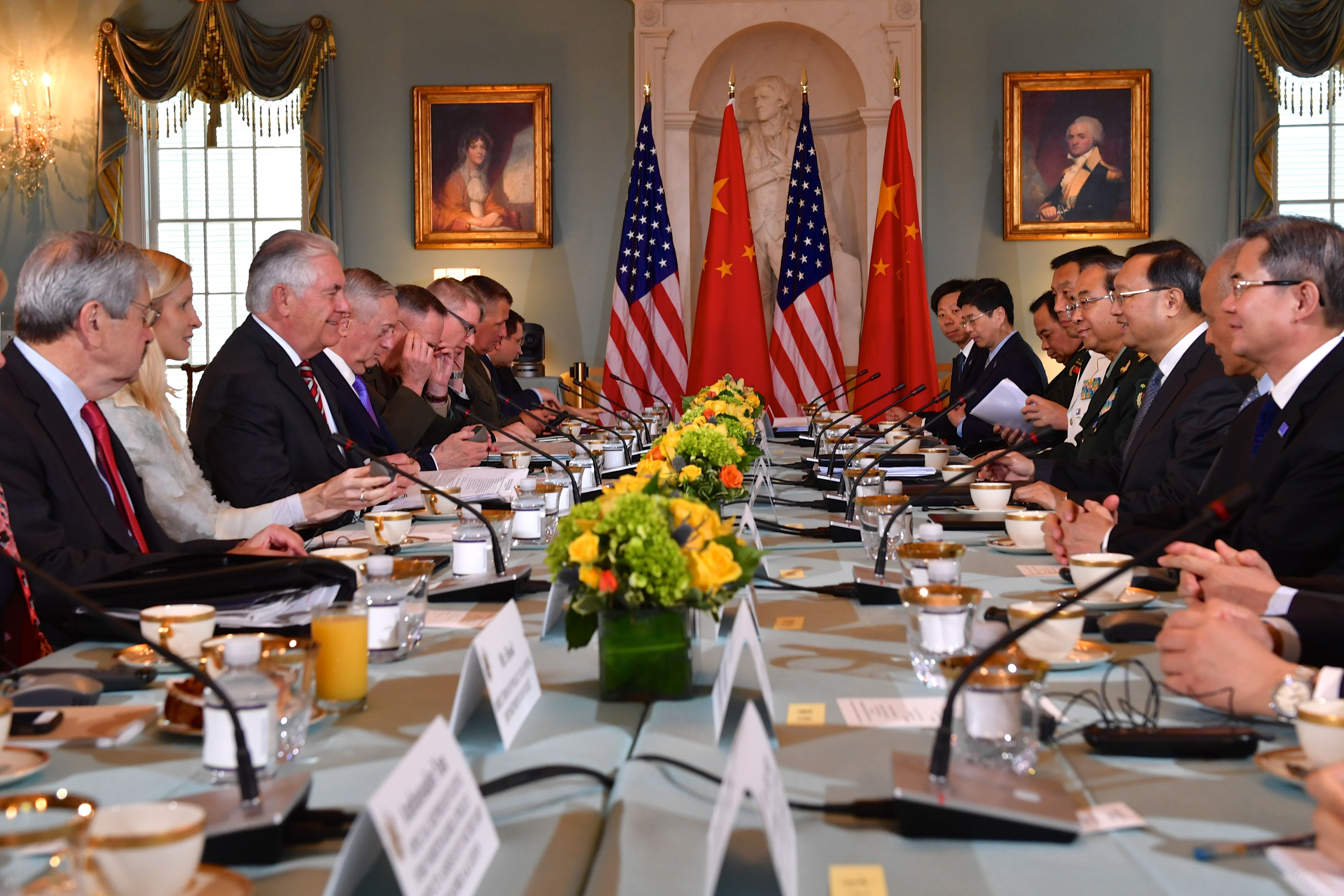
Yang Jiechi and General Fang Fenghui with James Mattis and Rex Tillerson, June 2017

=== 19th Committee ===
- Leader
  - Xi Jinping, General Secretary of the Chinese Communist Party, President of China, Chairman of the Central Military Commission
- Deputy leader
  - Li Keqiang, Premier of China, Politburo Standing Committee of the Chinese Communist Party member
- Group members
  - Wang Qishan, Vice President of China
  - Yang Jiechi, member of the Politburo of the Chinese Communist Party
  - Huang Kunming, Head of the Party Publicity Department
  - Wang Yi, State Councilor and Minister of Foreign Affairs
  - Wei Fenghe, State Councilor and Minister of National Defense
  - Zhao Kezhi, State Councilor and Minister of Public Security
  - Song Tao, Head of the Party International Department
  - Chen Wenqing, Minister of State Security
  - Zhong Shan → Wang Wentao, Minister of Commerce
  - Liu Jieyi, Director of the Taiwan Affairs Office
  - Zhang Xiaoming → Xia Baolong, Director of the Hong Kong and Macau Affairs Office
  - Jiang Jianguo → Xu Lin, Director of the State Council Information Office
  - Xu Yousheng → Pan Yue, Director of the Overseas Chinese Affairs Office
- Director of the General Office and Secretary-General
  - Yang Jiechi
- Deputy Director of the General Office
  - Le Yucheng, Executive Vice Foreign Minister

=== 20th Committee ===
- Leader
  - Xi Jinping, General Secretary of the Chinese Communist Party, President of China, Chairman of the Central Military Commission
- Deputy leader
  - Li Qiang, Premier of China, member of the Politburo Standing Committee of the Chinese Communist Party
- Group members
  - Han Zheng, Vice President of China
- Director of General Office and Secretary-General
  - Wang Yi, member of the Politburo of the Chinese Communist Party and Minister of Foreign Affairs
- Deputy Director of the General Office
  - Guo Yezhou

== See also ==
- Foreign relations of China
- Ministry of Foreign Affairs (China)
- National Security Commission of the Chinese Communist Party
