= Fudan Fuzhong Overseas Foundation =

- Established: 2006
- Co-chair of the Board: Ling Liu and Minhua Zhang
- Address: One Dock Street, Suite 610; Stamford, CT 06902
- Location: Stamford, CT
- Website: FDFZalumni.org

Fudan Fuzhong Overseas Foundation (FFOF) is a 501(c)(3) non-profit charity registered in the United States. It is the first independently operated foundation for any Chinese high school outside of China; and as of January, 2017, it is the only one in the United States. The foundation was founded in October, 2006 in New York City by a group of alumni and was incorporated in Connecticut in the following month. The mission statement of the foundation is to leverage overseas Fudan Fuzhong alumni network and the broader philanthropic community; to support financially deprived students and other education related programs at Fudan Fuzhong. As of 2011, the working committee of the Foundation consists of 14 alumni based in New York, New Jersey, Minnesota and Shanghai, China, all on volunteer basis, from class of 1979 to 2007. Over 500 members are registered with the foundation, most of whom are overseas alumni of the eponymous high school.

== "Give-a-Hand" Wang Jialian Need-based Scholarship ==
The flagship scholarship sponsored by the Foundation helps poor students and their family to meet their financial challenges. The scholarship awards RMB 3,000, 5,000 or 7,000 to each of the 8 to 10 recipients every year based on their family economic profile. This amount intends to covers all school related expenses (room, board, transportation, books, stationary, etc.). Together with the waiving of tuition (RMB 5,000) by the school, offered automatically to all recipients of this scholarship, the scholarship effectively relieves the recipients' families of their financial obligations in sending the students to school. As of 2010, the average annual family income of all applicants is around RMB 22,500, and the reported school expenditure is RMB 12,000. The scholarship is jointly sponsored by class of 1979–3 in memory of its homeroom teacher Mrs. Wang Jialian.

== Social Contribution Award ==
Commenced in spring 2007, the Social Contribution Award is the first merit-based scholarship created by the Foundation. This scholarship awards students for their special contributions to communities outside of the school and family. Since its inception, the Foundation has granted the award to two outstanding individuals and groups each year. From leading community-wide initiatives on environmental awareness, to volunteering teaching in rural provinces affected with AIDS, these students have demonstrated outstanding leadership qualities and longstanding dedication to the greater cause they have committed their time and effort to.

== Performing Arts Award ==
In Fall 2008, the Foundation launched the Performing Arts Award to recognize students with exceptional talents in one or more areas of performing arts, such as musical instruments, vocal music, and dancing. The award is made possible by the donation of Ms. Tianyin Shi (Class of 1984). Applicants demonstrated their artistic talents and their passion for arts conveyed through their interpretation of music. The award was given to two to three students each year.

== Student Resource Center ==
Launched in November 2010, the Fudan Fuzhong Overseas Foundation Student Resource Center (知缘阁) is the first on-campus facility completely funded by the foundation. The initial setup of the resource center includes large volumes of English language books and two iMac computers. The foundation overseas daily operation and annual restocking of books. In addition to enhancing students’ learning experience, the resource center serves as a communication channel and event space for foundation related activities. 15 student volunteers from the school participate in the daily maintenance of the center.

== Chemistry Lab Upgrade ==
As of spring 2011, working with a large individual donor, the foundation has pledged US$8,500 for the upcoming renovation of the chemistry laboratory. The funds are to be used to purchase a group of scientific instruments to be used for daily teaching purposes.

== H-Week ==
In fall 2012, the foundation started sponsoring 2 students from Fudan Fuzhong to participate in the HWeek program at Harvard College. The candidates submit applications and are interviewed and selected by foundation members. The foundation, with partnership with another alumnae, covers the entire financial cost of the trip. The students spend a week embedded with Harvard college student hosts in early November for an immersion program.

== Private Film Screening ==
In Nov, 2012, the foundation hosted a private photography and film screening for alumnae of the high school, Yi Chen ('99). The one-night event raised over $1,000 for Yi's on-going independent film projects.

== Immigration Seminar ==
An immigration seminar was held in Nov, 2013 by the foundation to benefit alumni preparing for and in the process of green card application. A guest attorney offered a 2-hour lecture on the legal caveats and answered questions from the floor.

== Fund-raising ==
The foundation hosts various fund-raising events in New York City including an annual Luncheon and a Charity Poker Tournament. A summer camp for 1-9th graders is also jointly sponsored by the foundation held every summer on Fuzhong campus. In addition, there is an Amazon Associates partnership program that allows anyone who make purchase on Amazon.com via the foundation link to effectively donate 5-6% of the total purchase to the Foundation. Major donors are recognized through the foundation's Heritage Society. The fund-raising effort in New York City has been reported by SinoVision, NYTV8, World Journal, Xing Dao Daily and US Qiao Bao.

== Alumni and Public Relations ==
The foundation started with fewer than 100 members and has grown to more than 500 members over the past four years. Hoping to provide a better platform for alumni to mingle, the foundation hosts two main socials every year. Summer picnic in July or August is tailored to alumni with families and kids, although alumni and friends of all ages are welcome; around 50 alumni attend summer picnic on average. Thanksgiving karaoke in November attracts college students and fresh grads; usually around 20 alumni come to Thanksgiving karaoke.
