= One institution with two names =

Nomenclature arrangement for Chinese government bodies

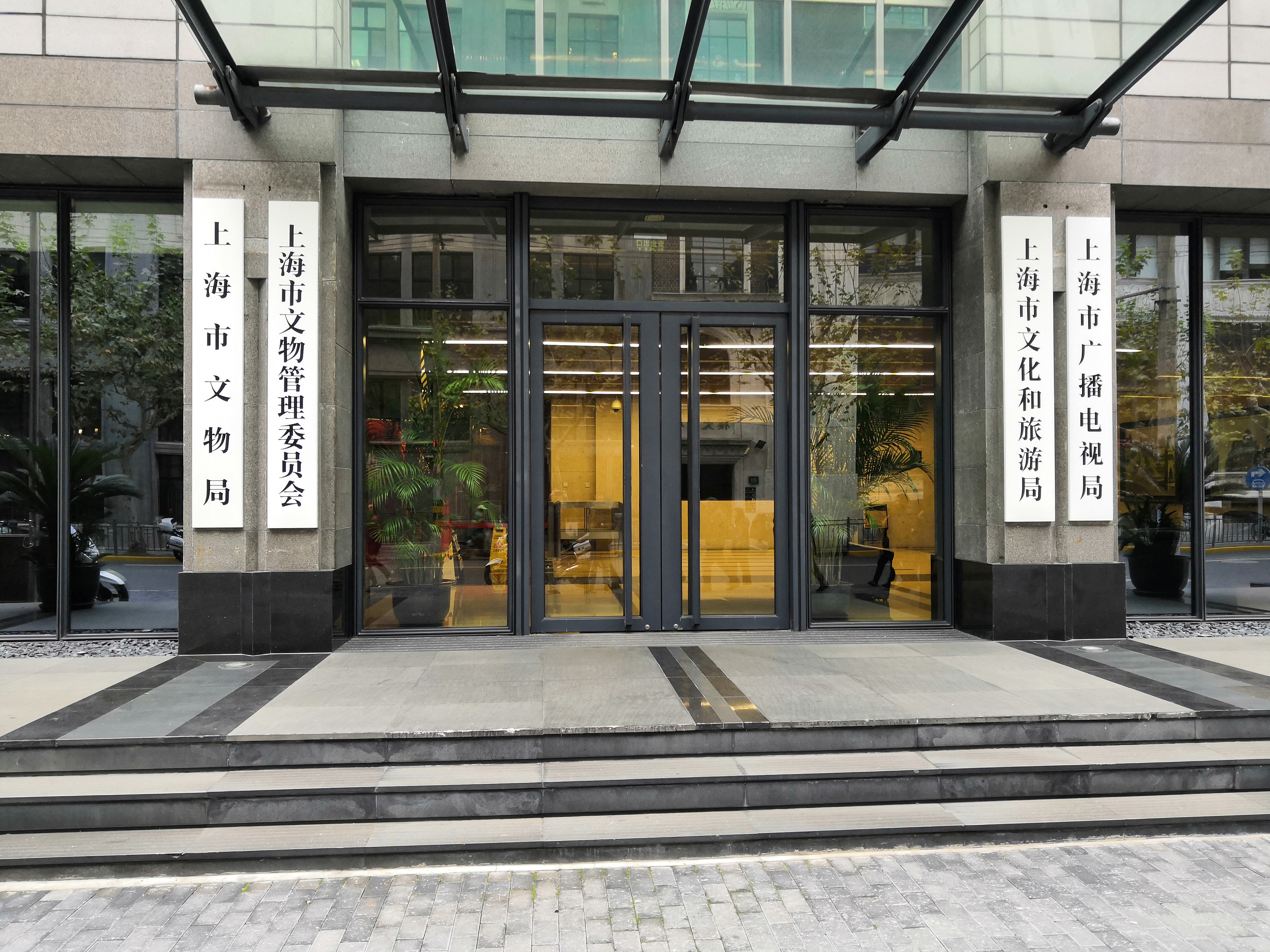
The entrance to the former office building of the Shanghai Municipal Culture and Tourism Bureau (上海市文化和旅游局), with additional signs of the "Shanghai Municipal Bureau of Cultural Relics" (上海市文物局), "Shanghai Radio and Television Bureau" (上海市广播电视局) and "Shanghai Cultural Relics Management Committee" (上海市文物管理委员会) name plates

"One institution with two names" (Chinese: 一个机构两块牌子; pinyin: yīgè jīgòu liǎng kuài páizi; lit. 'one agency two signs') is a bureaucratic arrangement in the Chinese government wherein a government agency exists in name only, and its functions are in practice performed by another agency or a Chinese Communist Party (CCP) organization so that in effect one institution has two or more governmental brands to use selectively for political, historical, or bureaucratic reasons. This type of arrangement was historically common until the mid-1980s but has been extensively revived by reforms which began in 2017.

Generally, the purpose of retaining the name of the state institution is so that the party institution can use it where it may be legally or aesthetically appropriate. In other cases, an institution may wish to emphasize specific responsibilities or services it may offer without creating new bureaucratic structures. One commonly encountered situation is where one name is where is used domestically, and another can be used when dealing with institutions outside China (where “communist party” may have negative connotations). The arrangement can be achieved by either "adding a name" (加挂牌子; jiā guà páizi) or "externally retaining a name" (对外保留牌子; duìwài bǎoliú páizi). The arrangement is sometimes called "one institution, two brands."

According to the explanation of the Office of the Central Institutional Organization Commission, "One organization means one legal representative, one financial account, one leadership team and one team. Two names means that the organization has two names and uses different names to the outside world according to the need of the work".

Within Chinese bureaucratic nomenclature, "one institution with two names" is distinct from "co-located offices". In the latter situation, two institutions or agencies retain their distinct structure and personnel and only share office spaces and physical resources.

== Adding a name ==
An organization can acquire an additional name when it is responsible for multiple duties or uses an additional name when dealing with foreign institutions. This happens when two institutions or offices merge, with the original institution taking on the responsibilities and duties of the merged office by using only its existing resources. Such organizations usually do not have separate leadership or staff because of additional names.

== Externally retaining a name ==
"Externally retaining a name" is when an organization that has absorbed another can continue to use said organization's name for bureaucratic purposes. For example, the United Front Work Department (UFWD) (a communist party institution) uses the name of the Overseas Chinese Affairs Office (OCAO) (a state institution), which it absorbed in 2018, when making statements related to overseas Chinese affairs. In this case, the organization may have a separate nominal leadership team for the nominal organization, that concurrently can also serve in the leadership of the bigger organization (e.g. Chen Xu both officially serves as the director of the OCAO and a deputy head of the UFWD). In some cases, the nominal organization can seemingly retain their internal structures (e.g. the China National Space Administration seemingly has a large internal structure and is a retained name for the Ministry of Industry and Information Technology).

== Examples ==
=== Examples of one organization with two names ===
- Central Military Commission of the Chinese Communist Party and the Central Military Commission of the People's Republic of China
- Cyberspace Administration of China and Office of the Central Cyberspace Affairs Commission
- Taiwan Affairs Office of the State Council and Taiwan Work Office of the Central Committee of the Chinese Communist Party
- Hong Kong and Macau Affairs Office of the State Council and Hong Kong and Macau Work Office of the Central Committee of the Chinese Communist Party
- Hong Kong Liaison Office and Hong Kong Work Committee of the Central Committee of the Chinese Communist Party
- Macau Liaison Office and Macau Work Committee of the Central Committee of the Chinese Communist Party
- All-China Federation of Industry and Commerce and All-China Chamber of Industry and Commerce
- China Institutes of Contemporary International Relations and the 11th Bureau of the Ministry of State Security

Chinese public universities' internal CCP committee and the universities' office of the president increasingly operate as one institution with two names.

=== Examples of externally retained names ===
- National Religious Affairs Administration (retained by the United Front Work Department)
- Overseas Chinese Affairs Office (retained by the United Front Work Department)
- State Council Information Office (retained by the Central Propaganda Department)
- National Press and Publication Administration (retained by the Central Propaganda Department)
- National Copyright Administration (retained by the Central Propaganda Department)
- China Film Administration (retained by the Central Propaganda Department)
- Chinese Academy of Governance (retained by the Central Party School of the Chinese Communist Party)

== See also ==
- Organization of the Chinese Communist Party
