= Yiwu Business Daily =

Chinese Communist Party newspaper

- Owner: Yiwu Fusion Media Center
- Publisher: Yiwu Municipal Committee of the Chinese Communist Party
- Founded: 1992
- Language: Chinese
- OCLC number: 866047836
- Website: szb1.ywcity.cn

Yiwu Business Daily (Chinese: 义乌商报), a publication in Zhejiang Province, People's Republic of China, is associated with the Yiwu Fusion Media Center. Established in 1992, it was initially named Yiwu Daily (Chinese: 义乌日报), serving as the official newspaper of the Yiwu Municipal Committee of the Chinese Communist Party (CCP) and the Yiwu Municipal People's Government. It subsequently merged with Small Commodity World Newspaper (Chinese: 小商品世界报) and adopted its current title, now functioning as an economic metropolitan newspaper centered on Yiwu.

== History ==
During the Great Leap Forward, the CCP Yiwu County Committee established its own official newspaper, which was abolished before to 1961, leaving Yiwu without a newspaper for an extended duration. In 1992, the CCP Yiwu Municipal Committee reinstated its official newspaper, Yiwu Gazette, and established a printing facility in March 1993 for its formal publication to the public. In 1998, the Yiwu Gazette was rebranded as Yiwu Daily, transforming into a daily newspaper, and in that same year, its affiliated publication, Small Commodity World News, was established. After 2001, Yiwu Daily has emerged as one of the most prolific county newspapers in mainland China, achieving substantial advertising revenue that surpasses that of certain local city newspapers, ranking only behind Shunde Newspaper nationally. Concurrently, the government has progressively eliminated financial subsidies for the publication, which has supplanted provincial and municipal newspapers in Zhejiang Province, establishing itself as the most reputable newspaper within the Yiwu distribution area.

On July 15, 2003, the General Office of the Chinese Communist Party and the General Office of the State Council promulgated a directive regarding the regulation of newspapers and magazines. Consequently, certain county newspapers in Zhejiang Province faced closure, whereas Yiwu Daily and over a dozen other newspapers in the same province were preserved due to favorable business conditions. On January 1, 2004, Yiwu Daily and Small Commodity World Newspaper amalgamated to form a new publication, which was subsequently renamed Yiwu Daily and Small Commodity World Newspaper in 2006.

In 2005, the newspaper assisted the adjacent Pujiang County in establishing its official publication, Pujiang Today (Chinese: 《今日浦江》).

Yiwu City, recognized for hosting the largest wholesale market for small commodities in mainland China and experiencing a surge in international trade, has seen Yiwu Business News expand its coverage of China's foreign trade and the advancement of the Belt and Road Initiative in recent years. The publication now offers an English version for international readers and supplies news to various Chinese newspapers, including Wen Wei Po, The China Press, Nouvelles d'Europe, Diário Chinês para a América do Sul, to promote Yiwu globally.
