= Li Dezhu =

Chinese politician

- 李德洙

Director of the National Ethnic Affairs Commission
- In office 18 March 1998 – 17 March 2008
- Preceded by: Ismail Amat
- Succeeded by: Yang Jing

Personal details
- Born: November 1943 (age 82) Wangqing County, Jilin, Manchukuo
- Party: Chinese Communist Party
- Education: Yanbian University

Chinese name
- Chinese: 李德洙
Transcriptions
Standard Mandarin
- Hanyu Pinyin: Lǐ Dézhū

Li Dezhu (Chinese: 李德洙; Korean: 리덕수; born November 1943) is a Chinese politician of Korean ethnicity who served as director of the National Ethnic Affairs Commission from 1998 to 2008.

He was an alternate member of the 12th Central Committee of the Chinese Communist Party and a member of the 13th, 14th, 15th and 16th Central Committee of the Chinese Communist Party. He was a representative of the 13th, 14th, 15th, 16th and 17th National Congress of the Chinese Communist Party. He was a member of the 11th National Committee of the Chinese People's Political Consultative Conference.

== Biography ==
Li was born in Wangqing County, Jilin, in November 1943, during the Manchukuo. He joined the Chinese Communist Party (CCP) in April 1965. After graduating from Yanbian University in 1967, he was assigned to the CCP Wangqing County Committee. He was a member of the Central Committee of the Communist Youth League of China, deputy secretary of the Jilin Provincial Committee of the Communist Youth League of China, and president of Jilin Youth Federation in 1978. In 1983, he became party secretary of Longjing County. That same year, he rose to become governor and party secretary of Yanbian Korean Autonomous Prefecture. In 1985, he was admitted to member of the Standing Committee of the CCP Jilin Provincial Committee, the province's top authority. He also served as vice governor of Jilin, deputy head of the United Front Work Department, and deputy director of the State Ethnic Affairs Commission. In 1998, he was promoted to director of the National Ethnic Affairs Commission, a post he kept until March 2008.

Government offices
Preceded by Ismail Amat	Director of the National Ethnic Affairs Commission; 1998–2008	Succeeded by Yang Jing
