= Bagatur =

Chinese politician (born 1955)

- ᠪᠠᠭᠠᠲᠦᠷ
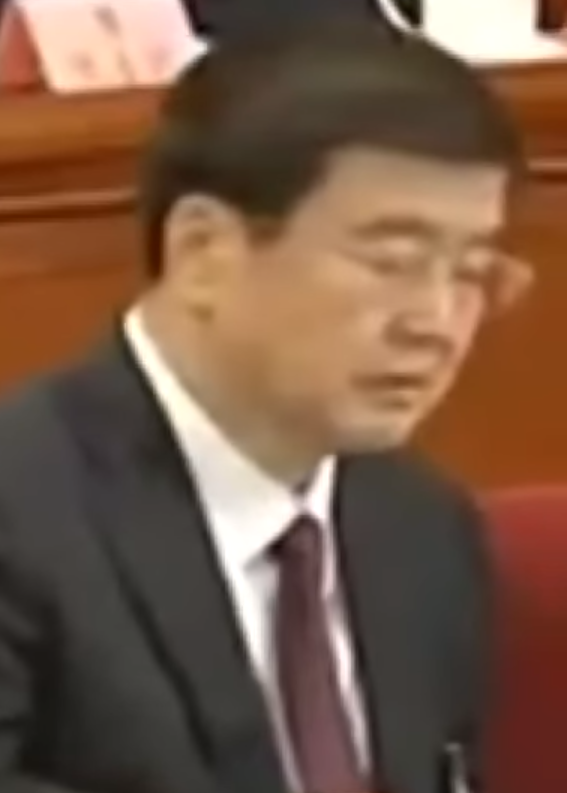
- Bagatur in 2020

Vice Chairman of the Chinese People's Political Consultative Conference
- Incumbent
- Assumed office 14 March 2018
- Chairman: Wang Yang; Wang Huning

Director of the National Ethnic Affairs Commission
- In office 28 April 2016 – 14 December 2020
- Premier: Li Keqiang
- Preceded by: Wang Zhengwei
- Succeeded by: Chen Xiaojiang

Deputy Head of the United Front Work Department of the Chinese Communist Party
- In office 8 April 2016 – 26 December 2020
- Head: Sun Chunlan; You Quan

Chairman of Inner Mongolia
- In office 12 January 2009 – 30 March 2016
- Party Secretary: Hu Chunhua; Wang Jun
- Preceded by: Yang Jing
- Succeeded by: Bu Xiaolin

Personal details
- Born: February 1955 (age 71) Kangping, Liaoning, China
- Party: Chinese Communist Party (1981–present)

Chinese name
- Simplified Chinese: 巴特尔
- Traditional Chinese: 巴特爾
Transcriptions
Standard Mandarin
- Hanyu Pinyin: Bātè'ěr

Bagatur or Bater (Mongolian: ᠪᠠᠭᠠᠲᠦᠷ; Chinese: 巴特尔; pinyin: Bātè'ěr; born February 1955) is a Chinese Communist Party politician of Mongol ancestry, formerly serving as the director of the National Ethnic Affairs Commission. A career party functionary with background in the Communist Youth League, Bagatur steadily ascended the ranks of government, spending his entire career in Inner Mongolia. Between 2009 and 2016, he served as the Chairman of Inner Mongolia.

As the Chairman of the National Ethnic Affairs Commission from 2016 to 2020, he was responsible for the relations between the Central Government and the other 55 ethnic minorities in China (such as Uyghurs, Tibetans etc.).

== Biography ==
Bagatur, an ethnic Mongol, was born in Kangping County in northeastern Liaoning Province in February 1955. He obtained a diploma in Mongolian language from Hailar Mongolian Normal College. He began work in January 1973 in Ulan Muqir in the Evenk Autonomous Banner under Hulunbuir city, Heilongjiang Province. He joined the Chinese Communist Party (CCP) in December 1981 and went to serve in Inner Mongolia, ultimately becoming secretary of the Inner Mongolia Autonomous Regional Committee of the Communist Youth League of China between April 1986 and April 1992.

Bagatur served as the secretary of the CCP Wuhai Municipal Committee from March 1994 to December 1999 and also mayor of Wuhai from December 1994 to February 1998. During this time, he obtained a master's degree in political economics from Fudan University. He was the Secretary of the Inner Mongolia Autonomous Region's party Discipline Inspection Commission from December 1999 to April 2008, and beginning in December 2001 was named deputy secretary of the CCP Inner Mongolia Autonomous Regional Committee. Bagatur was appointed acting chairman and vice chairman of the regional government on April 3, 2008. He was elected chairman on January 12, 2009.

Bagatur was an alternate of the 15th Central Committee. He was a member of the 16th and 17th Central Commissions of Discipline Inspection. On December 27, 2008, Bagatur was admitted as a substitute delegate to the 11th National People's Congress (NPC) representing Inner Mongolia. In November 2012, he was elected to the 18th Central Committee of the Chinese Communist Party. In March 2016, Bagatur was transferred to become the director of the National Ethnic Affairs Commission.

Government offices
Preceded by Yang Jing	Chairman of Inner Mongolia; 2008–2016	Succeeded by Bu Xiaolin
Preceded by Wang Zhengwei	Director of the National Ethnic Affairs Commission; 2016–2020	Succeeded by Chen Xiaojiang
