= China News Service =

News agency of the Chinese Communist Party

China News Service 中国新闻社
- Logo of CNS

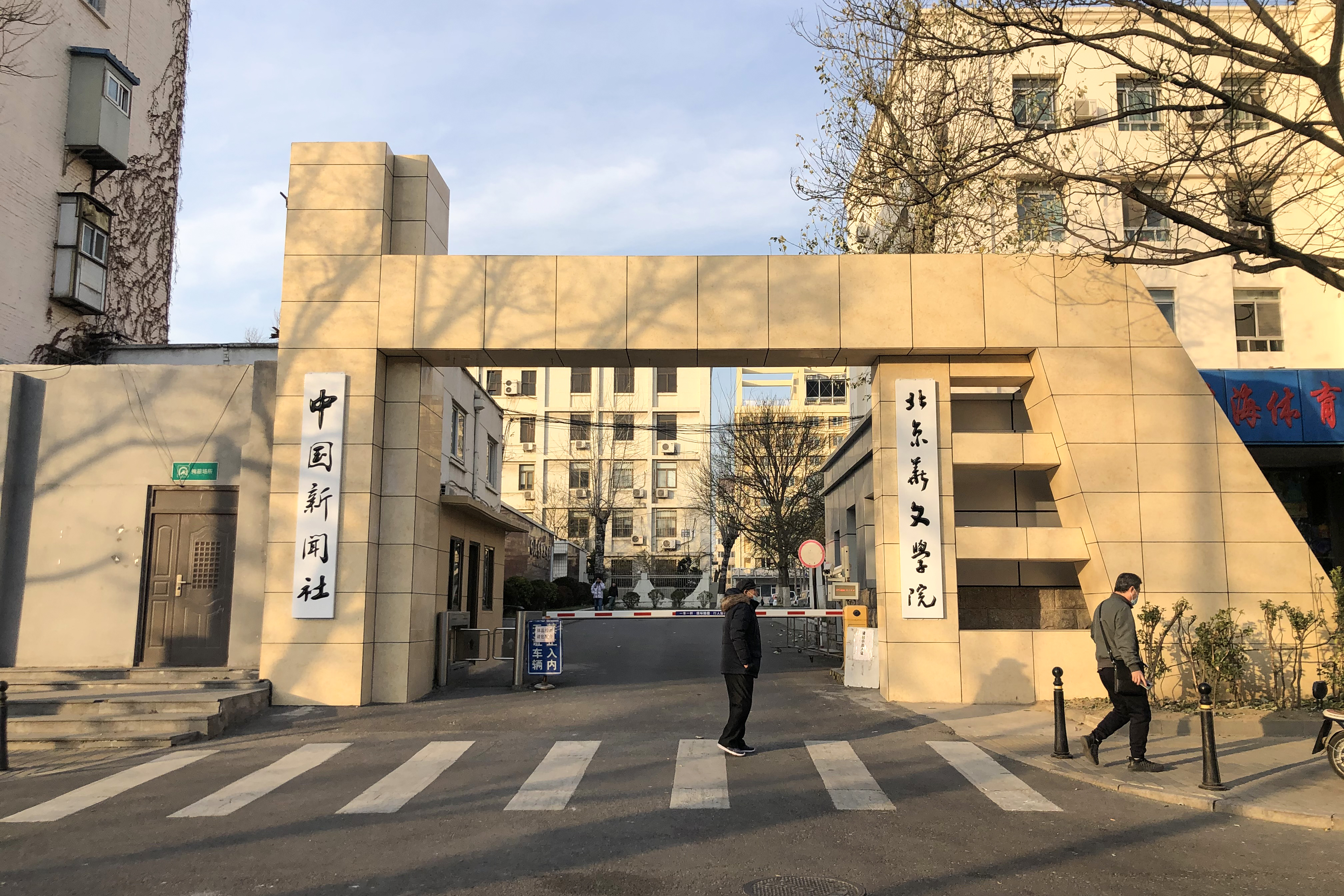
- Headquarters in 2020
- Founded: 1 October 1952; 74 years ago
- Type: Broadcast radio, television and online
- Location: China
- Parent organization: United Front Work Department of the Central Committee of the Chinese Communist Party
- Website: www.ecns.cn (in English) www.chinanews.com.cn (in Chinese)

China News Service (CNS; Chinese: 中国新闻社) is the second largest state news agency in the People's Republic of China, after Xinhua News Agency. China News Service was formerly administered by the Overseas Chinese Affairs Office, which was merged into the United Front Work Department of the Central Committee of the Chinese Communist Party (CCP) in 2018. Its operations have traditionally been directed at overseas Chinese worldwide and residents of Hong Kong, Macau and Taiwan.

== History ==
CNS was established in 1952 as a successor to the CCP's International News Agency. It has news offices and stations in every province in mainland China, as well as in Hong Kong and Macau. CNS also has news offices in foreign countries, including the United States, Japan, France, Thailand, New Zealand, and Australia. According to the Jamestown Foundation, CNS is "the CCP's main propaganda organ targeting overseas Chinese."

In 1990, CNS personnel were dispatched to the U.S. to found SinoVision and The China Press to counter negative perceptions of the Chinese government following the 1989 Tiananmen Square protests and massacre.

Since 2001, CNS has held a biannual Global Chinese Language Media Forum in China (also known as World Chinese Language Media Forum), a large global summit of Chinese media leaders. In 2007, CNS established the China News Service Overseas Center, which provides news reports, editorials, and layout for overseas Chinese media outlets. In 2009, CNS established the Global Chinese Media Cooperative Union (GCMCU), which redistributes CNS and other Chinese state media content to other Chinese-language media outlets. In Europe, newspapers and outlets such as Nouvelles d'Europe in France, Cine in Italia in Italy, Ouhua News in Spain, the Prague Chinese Times in the Czech Republic, and EurAsia Info in Switzerland carry CNS content.

In 2014, CNS published an editorial which derided outgoing American ambassador to China Gary Locke. The editorial was widely criticized both within China and internationally for referring to the Chinese American ambassador as a banana which was interpreted as a racial slur. The article also mocked his Mandarin Chinese abilities and said that his ancestors would disown him if they knew about his loyalties.

In 2017, a former editor-in-chief and Chinese Communist Party Committee Secretary of CNS until February 2015, Liu Beixian, was charged with taking bribes during the anti-corruption campaign under Xi Jinping and expelled from the CCP.

In 2018, CNS became part of the United Front Work Department (UFWD) when its host organization, the Overseas Chinese Affairs Office, was folded into the UFWD. The same year, a deputy head of the UFWD stated that "[a]s an important propaganda unit of the United Front, CNS must adhere to the concept of 'newspapers run by politicians' and thoroughly carry out political awareness work. CNS's important mission is to do good united front propaganda work within Overseas Chinese affairs."

In 2019, CNS began a campaign to increase its influence on overseas social media. According to NPR and the Australian Strategic Policy Institute, CNS was involved in targeted disinformation and propaganda campaigns during the 2019–20 Hong Kong protests. That year, CNS released a public tender to increase its Twitter followers. According to a 2020 investigation by ProPublica, CNS hired a third-party firm to create fake Twitter accounts to spread conspiracy theories and disinformation related to the COVID-19 pandemic.

In June 2020, the United States Department of State designated China News Service, along with other Chinese state media outlets, as a foreign mission.

During the Russian invasion of Ukraine, CNS repeated unsubstantiated Russian state media claims that the Bucha massacre was staged. In 2023, cybersecurity researchers found that CNS had established sock puppet accounts on Twitter for influence operations in Latin America.

== Activities ==
=== Film and television production ===
During the early stages of CNS's establishment, a film team was created under Liao Chengzhi's guidance, led by Wu Jiang and others. From the 1950s onwards, numerous documentaries and operas, including "North and South of Taishan", "Heroes of Qilu", "Sisters Get Married Easily" and "The Pearl Pagoda", were produced and distributed in Hong Kong, Macau and overseas.

In 1979, CNS's business departments underwent reconstruction. Following Liao Chengzhi's instruction to revive the agency's film work, a team of professionals from Beijing film production institutions were transferred by the agency's leadership to expand the film team into a dedicated department. This led to the establishment of the "Nanhai Film Company", with Wu Jiang as its chairman. In 1981, CNS produced its inaugural feature film, The Wilderness, under the banner of "Nanhai Film Company."

Beginning with the film The Savage Land, the Film Department of the China News Agency (expanded to become the Film and Video Department in 1985) has since produced feature films and film documentaries, starring actors such as Liu Xiaoqing, Chen Baoguo, Pu Cunxin, Jiang Wen, and Ge You. The Department of Film Sound and Video has also worked with professionals from Changchun Film Studio, Beijing Film Studio and Shanghai Film Studio.

=== Video ===
In April 2007, CNS officially released a television news release called "China News Video". In October 2007, CNS and Sina Corporation signed a strategic cooperation agreement, and "China News Video" debuted on Sina.

In July 2010, CNS adjusted the business of its Film and Television Department and set up a new Video News Department, positioning video news as the "third channel news", and using China News Service website as the basic communication platform to promote video interviews, and launching a column called "Focus on Net Affairs". Since its establishment in 2010, the department has been involved in the coverage of major events such as the "Two Sessions", the 2010 Yushu earthquake, Expo 2010, the 2010 Gansu mudslide, the 2010 Asian Games, and the 2012 Summer Olympics.

CNS provides overseas Chinese media outlets with services for website building, app creation, and content dissemination, which provide CNS with avenues for its syndicated news and video content.

=== Publications ===
CNS publishes China Newsweek, Fengya and World Chinese Media Yearbook in China, and China Digest (monthly) in Hong Kong, and runs the Hong Kong China News Press.

=== Affiliates ===
CNS controlled the Chinese New Zealand Herald, which was co-owned by New Zealand Media and Entertainment.

== Notable employees ==
The past presidents and editors-in-chief of China News Service are as follows:

President or director

- Jin Zhonghua (December 1952-January 1969)
- Liu Zepeng (February 2000 - February 2007)
- Guo Zhaojin (郭招金) (February 2007-March 2009)
- Liu Beixian (刘北宪) (March 2009 - 5 February 2015)
- Zhang Xinxin (章新新) (February 6, 2015 - November 7, 2019)
- Chen Lujun (陈陆军) (November 8, 2019─)

Editor-in-chief

- Liu Beixian (刘北宪) (February 2007 - March 2009)
- Zhang Xinxin (章新新) (March 2009 - February 2015)
- Wang Xiaohui (王晓晖) (March 2015—)

== Commentary ==
According to scholars Filip Jirouš and Petra Ševčíková, "CNS's activity lies at the symbiotic intersection of propaganda and united front work." They state that such a symbiosis helps the CCP to shape the "information landscape" to better serve the party's policy goals.

== See also ==
- Chinese information operations and information warfare
- Mass media in China
- China Internet Information Center
