= Chen Xiaojiang =

Chinese politician (born 1962)

- 陈小江

Party Secretary of Xinjiang
- Incumbent
- Assumed office 1 July 2025
- Deputy: Erkin Tuniyaz (chairman)
- General secretary: Xi Jinping
- Preceded by: Ma Xingrui

Executive Deputy Head of the United Front Work Department
- In office 11 February 2022 – 1 July 2025
- Preceded by: Zhang Yijiong

Director of the National Ethnic Affairs Commission
- In office 26 December 2020 – 24 June 2022
- Premier: Li Keqiang

Deputy Secretary of the Central Commission for Discipline Inspection
- In office 25 October 2017 – 11 December 2020
- Secretary: Zhao Leji
- Preceded by: Bagatur
- Succeeded by: Pan Yue

Deputy Director of the National Supervisory Commission
- In office 11 March 2018 – 14 December 2020
- Director: Yang Xiaodu

Vice Minister of Supervision
- In office 22 May 2017 – 11 March 2018
- Minister: Yang Xiaodu

Personal details
- Born: June 1962 (age 64) Longyou County, Zhejiang, China
- Party: Chinese Communist Party
- Education: Wuhan University

Chinese name
- Simplified Chinese: 陈小江
- Traditional Chinese: 陳小江
Transcriptions
Standard Mandarin
- Hanyu Pinyin: Chén Xiǎojiāng

Chen Xiaojiang (Chinese: 陈小江; pinyin: Chén Xiǎojiāng; born June 1962) is a Chinese writer and politician who is the Party Secretary of Xinjiang since 2025.

Chen joined the Ministry of Water Resources in 1998, working there until he was appointed as the head of the Publicity Department of Central Commission for Discipline Inspection, the party's internal disciplinary body, in 2015. In 2016, he was appointed as the secretary of the Liaoning Provincial Commission for Discipline Inspection. He became a vice minister of supervision in 2017. Chen became the deputy director of the National Supervisory Commission, the highest anti-corruption agency of China, in 2018. He also served as the and deputy secretary of the Central Commission for Discipline Inspection.

In 2020, Chen was appointed as the director of the National Ethnic Affairs Commission; he was the first Han director of the commission in six decades. He also served as the Executive Deputy Head of the United Front Work Department of the Central Committee of the Chinese Communist Party since 2022. He succeeded Ma Xingrui as the Party Secretary of Xinjiang in 2025.

== Early life and education ==
Chen was born in Longyou County, Zhejiang, in June 1962. In 1980, he entered Wuhan Institute of Hydraulic and Electric Engineering (now Wuhan University), majoring in power system and its automation at the Department of Electrical Engineering, where he graduated in 1984.

== Editorial career ==
He worked at the China Electric Power News for a short while before joining the China Water Resources and Electric Power News in 1986. He was promoted to chief editor in 1993 and president in 1996, respectively.

== Political career ==
Chen began his career in the Ministry of Water Resources in 1998, what he was appointed director-general of the General Office in April 2008 and then director of the Yellow River Conservancy Commission in March 2011.

In August 2015, he became head of the Publicity Department of Central Commission for Discipline Inspection (CCDI), but having held the position for only seven months.

In May 2016, he was transferred to northeast China's Liaoning province, where he was secretary of the Liaoning Provincial Commission for Discipline Inspection, the party's agency in charge of anti-corruption efforts. And he was admitted to member of the standing committee of the CPC Liaoning Provincial Committee, the province's top authority.

In May 2017, he was recalled to Beijing and appointed deputy director of the Ministry of Supervision, the then highest anti-corruption agency of China. On 25 October 2017, he became deputy secretary of the CCDI, a position at ministerial level. On 11 March 2018, he concurrently served as deputy director of the newly founded National Supervisory Commission.

On 24 December 2020, he was appointed director of the National Ethnic Affairs Commission and the National People's Congress confirmed the appointment on December 26. Chen is the second Han minister since the ministry was established in 1949, after Li Weihan. He also served as deputy head of the United Front Work Department.

On 1 July 2025, he was appointed the Chinese Communist Party Committee Secretary of the Xinjiang Uygur Autonomous Region, succeeding Ma Xingrui. In June 2026, he gave a speech before foreign officials in Altay, calling for Xinjiang to develop further trade routes through Central Asia.

Government offices
Preceded by Li Guoying	Director of the Yellow River Conservancy Commission; 2010–2015	Succeeded by Yue Zhongming
Preceded by Bagatur	Director of the National Ethnic Affairs Commission; 2020–2022	Succeeded by Pan Yue
Party political offices
Preceded by Ma Xingrui	Party Secretary of Xinjiang; 2025–present	Incumbent
Preceded by Lin Duo	Secretary of the Liaoning Provincial Commission for Discipline Inspection; 2016–2017	Succeeded by Liao Jianyu
Preceded by Xiao Pei	head of the Publicity Department of Central Commission for Discipline Inspection; 2015–2016	Succeeded by Zhu Guoxian
