= Director of the National Ethnic Affairs Commission =

Ministerial position in the People's Republic of China

Director of National Ethnic Affairs Commission of the People's Republic of China
- 中华人民共和国国家民族事务委员会主任
- National Emblem of China

- Flag of China

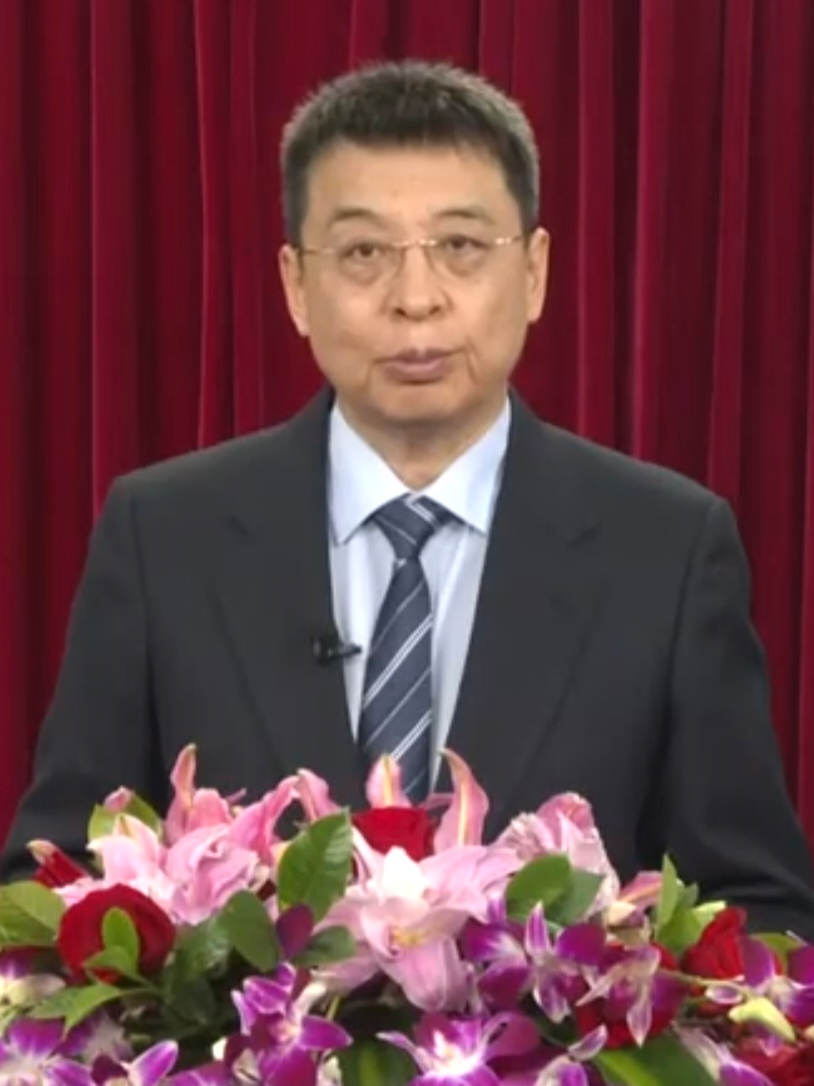
- Incumbent; Pan Yue since 24 June 2022
- National Ethnic Affairs Commission
- Status: Provincial and ministerial-level official
- Member of: Plenary Meeting of the State Council
- Seat: National Ethnic Affairs Commission Building, Xicheng District, Beijing
- Nominator: Premier (chosen within the Chinese Communist Party)
- Appointer: President with the confirmation of the National People's Congress or its Standing Committee
- Formation: 19 October 1949; 76 years ago
- First holder: Li Weihan
- Deputy: Deputy Director

The director of the National Ethnic Affairs Commission of the People's Republic of China is the head of the National Ethnic Affairs Commission of the People's Republic of China and a member of the State Council. Within the State Council, the position is seventh in order of precedence. The director is responsible for leading the commission, presiding over its meetings, and signing important documents related to the commission. Officially, the director is nominated by the premier of the State Council, who is then approved by the National People's Congress or its Standing Committee and appointed by the president.

The current director is Pan Yue, who concurrently serves as the Chinese Communist Party Committee Secretary of the commission.

== History ==
Between 1954 and 2020, the director of the commission was led by an ethnic minority, including Hui, Uyghurs, Koreans and Mongols. In 2020, Chen Xiaojiang, a member of the country's Han ethnic majority, was appointed as the director, becoming the first Han director since 1954.

== List of directors ==
No.	Portrait	Name	Took office	Left office	Important offices held during tenure	Highest office held	Notes	Ref.
Director of the Ethnic Affairs Commission of the Central People's Government
1		Li Weihan	19 October 1949	28 September 1954	Secretary-General of the State Council, Head of the United Front Work Department	Member of the Politburo Standing Committee, Vice Chairman of the Standing Committee of the National People's Congress, Vice Chairman of the Chinese People's Political Consultative Conference Deputy Director of the Central Advisory Commission	Deputy-state level, Han	
Director of the Ethnic Affairs Commission of the People's Republic of China
2		Ulanhu	28 September 1954	22 June 1970	Vice Premier of the State Council	Vice President of China	Deputy-state level, Mongol	
Director of the National Ethnic Affairs Commission of the People's Republic of China
3		Yang Jingren	5 March 1978	20 January 1986	Deputy Head of the United Front Work Department Vice Premier of the State Council since September 1980, Vice Chairman of the Chinese People's Political Consultative Conference since June 1983		Deputy-state level, Hui	
4		Ismail Amat	20 January 1986	18 March 1998	Vice Chairman of the Chinese People's Political Consultative Conference since April 1988 State Councilor since 1993	Vice Chairman of the Standing Committee of the National People's Congress	Deputy-state level, Uyghur	
5		Li Dezhu	18 March 1998	17 March 2008	Deputy Head of the United Front Work Department		Korean	
6		Yang Jing	17 March 2008	16 March 2013	Deputy Head of the United Front Work Department Secretary of the CCP Secretariat since November 2012	State Councilor and Secretary-General of the State Council	Deputy-state level, Mongol	
7		Wang Zhengwei	16 March 2013	28 April 2016	Vice Chairman of the Chinese People's Political Consultative Conference Deputy Head of the United Front Work Department	Vice Chairman of the Chinese People's Political Consultative Conference	Hui	
8		Bagatur	28 April 2016	26 December 2020	Vice Chairman of the Chinese People's Political Consultative Conference since March 2018	Vice Chairman of the Chinese People's Political Consultative Conference	Mongol	
9		Chen Xiaojiang	26 December 2020	24 June 2022	Deputy Head of the United Front Work Department	Executive Deputy Head of the United Front Work Department	Han	
10		Pan Yue	24 June 2022	Incumbent	Deputy Head of the United Front Work Department		Han	

== See also ==
- List of ethnic groups in China
