= To-wen Tseng =

American writer

- Traditional Chinese: 曾多聞
- Simplified Chinese: 曾多闻
Transcriptions
Standard Mandarin
- Hanyu Pinyin: Zēng Duōwén
- Wade–Giles: Tseng Tso-wen
- Tongyong Pinyin: Zeng Duowun

To-wen Tseng (Chinese: 曾多聞) is a Taiwanese American journalist, author, and breastfeeding activist. She is best known for her regular news spot "To-wen's World Report (Chinese: 多聞看世界)" on KSCI-TV (LA-18), the Asian-language station served Southern California. She has authored seven books, all in Mandarin Chinese.

Tseng's other writing has appeared on Rhythms Monthly, Travel+Leisure Chinese Edition, World Moms Network, and elsewhere. Her fiction work has appeared on World Journal and elsewhere. Her book Měiguó dú xiě jiàoyù jiào wǒmen de liù jiàn shì (Six lessons for Chinese literacy education, from American classroom) is a national best seller in Taiwan., while Wán chū kēxué lì: Yòng huìběn xué STEAM sùyǎng (Playful Science: Use Picture Books to Learn STEAM Literacy) was recognized by Taiwanese Ministry of Culture as a 2023 Best Non-Fiction Book for Primary and Secondary School Students. Her Chinese-language blog was a Global Chinese-language Blog Award finalist for current affairs/commentary category.

Tseng received a master's degree in broadcast journalism from Boston University. When she started her career as a criminal reporter for United Daily News and then TVBS in 2005, an Apple Daily series report described her as "the reporter in underwear" because she once posted for Modern Girl, a Taiwanese retailer of women's lingerie. The series report badly hurt her credibility and eventually resulted her moving to United States in 2006 to rebuild her career.

== List of Works ==
=== non-fictions ===
- Wēi zúy ǐ dào ( No Trivial Matter – The Journal of a US Correspondent) (2011)
- Báiyún dù shān (Dr. Matthew Y.C. Lin, A Biography)(2018)
- Měiguó dú xiě jiàoyù jiào wǒmen de liù jiàn shì (Six lessons from American literacy education for Chinese classroom)(2018)
- Měiguó dú xiě jiàoyù liù gè xuéxí xiànchǎng (Six Scenes of Literacy Education in America Observed by a Chinese Journalist)(2020)
- Shùwèi jiàoyǎng: Jìzhě māmā de cōngmíng jiàoyǎng tí'àn (Digital Literacy: Smart Parenting Guide from a Journalist Mom)(2022)
- Dài jì chuāngshāng: Ràng shānghài dào wǒ wéizhǐ (Intergenerational Trauma: Let the Hurt Stop With Me)(2025)

=== children's books ===
- Nà nián de shǔjià (Summer Days with A-Fu) (2014)
- Xiǎo hóng de zhǔbō mèng (Xiao-Hong Becomes An Anchorwoman) (2015)
- Yǐsèliè: Kējì lì yǔ chuàngxīn lì (Israel: Technology and Innovation) (2020)
- Wán chū kēxué lì: Yòng huìběn xué STEAM sùyǎng (Playful Science: Use Picture Books to Learn STEAM Literacy)(2022)

=== short stories ===
- Pàng māo (The Fat Cat)(2012)
- Wǒ de zhìyuàn (When I Grow Up)(2013)

== Work against breastfeeding discrimination ==
Tseng left KSCI and joined World Journal in 2012 when KSCI filed bankruptcy. She gave birth one year after joining World Journal and then returned to work in September, 2013 after a 3-month-long maternity leave. According to Tseng's personal blog, World Journal refused to accommodate her breastfeeding needs and she was forced to pump her breast milk in a bathroom stall, and was harassed by colleagues for attempting to wash pumping accessories in the office kitchen. Later on 21 October 2013, World Journal published a controversial article that allegedly discriminate breastfeeding women. Titled "Breastfeeding photos embarrass Chinese-American to death, the article cited anonymous resources, labeled breastfeeding photos as "R-rated-photos," described those photos as "disturbing" and "disgusting." The article received strong reaction among Chinese American community and the Taiwanese Breastfeeding Association launched a protection against World Journal. Media Watch criticized that the report was "misleading" and "biased." In November 2013, Legal Aid Society-Employment Law Center submitted a lawyer's letter to World Journal on behavior of Tseng, asking for a policy change to protect breastfeeding women. These incidents eventually resulted in Tseng's separation from World Journal. On 25 August 2014, World Journal agreed to pay for the damage. Tseng has ever since dedicated her career to advocating for family-friendly policy and gender equity at the workplace, blogging about breastfeeding as a human right and speaking out about breastfeeding barriers in Asian-American communities and beyond. Tseng has been actively working with San Diego County Breastfeeding Coalition and BreastfeedLA. She also regularly contributes to MomsRising.org.

In 2017, Tseng co-founded Asian American Breastfeeding Taskforce. In 2018, she received HealthConnect One Foundation's Birth Equity Leader Academy Community Project Award. In 2019, she was recognized by US Breastfeeding Committee as the Emerging Leader of the year. In 2020, an Asian breastfeeding photo voice project she led won California Breastfeeding Coalition's Golden Nugget Award for "excellence in reducing a key barrier to breastfeeding social norm." She co-founded National AANHPI Breastfeeding Week in 2021.
