= Yang Jing =

Chairman of Inner Mongolia

- 杨晶
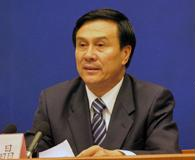
- Yang in 2009

State Councilor of China
- In office 16 March 2013 – 24 February 2018 Serving with Yang Jiechi, Chang Wanquan, Guo Shengkun, Wang Yong
- Premier: Li Keqiang

12th Secretary-General of the State Council
- In office 16 March 2013 – 24 February 2018
- Premier: Li Keqiang
- Preceded by: Ma Kai
- Succeeded by: Xiao Jie

Director of the National Ethnic Affairs Commission
- In office 17 March 2008 – 16 March 2013
- Premier: Li Keqiang
- Preceded by: Li Dezhu
- Succeeded by: Wang Zhengwei

9th Chairman of Inner Mongolia
- In office 3 April 2003 – 3 April 2008
- Preceded by: Uyunqimg
- Succeeded by: Bagatur

Personal details
- Born: December 1953 (age 72) Jungar Banner, Suiyuan, China
- Party: Chinese Communist Party

Chinese name
- Simplified Chinese: 杨晶
- Traditional Chinese: 楊晶
Transcriptions
Standard Mandarin
- Hanyu Pinyin: Yáng Jīng

Yang Jing (Chinese: 杨晶; pinyin: Yáng Jīng; born December 1953) is a former Chinese politician of Mongol ethnicity. He previously served as State Councilor and Secretary-General of the State Council, and the President of the Chinese Academy of Governance.

Prior to his ascendance to leading roles at the State Council, he served as the director of the National Ethnic Affairs Commission (2008–2013), and the Chairman of Inner Mongolia (2003–2008). Yang was one of the highest-ranking non-Han officials in the Chinese government.

== Early career ==
Yang was born in Jungar Banner in what was Ih Ju League of Inner Mongolia near the modern city of Ordos, and is of ethnic Mongol ancestry. He worked as a teenager in a farming equipment factory. In September 1973 Yang was recommended to obtain higher education at the Inner Mongolia Industry College. He then returned to his hometown to serve in the local Chinese Communist Party (CCP) organization. In 1982 Yang earned a degree in Chinese language from Inner Mongolia University.

After graduating, Yang worked in the Communist Youth League as a local organizer in Ih Ju League, then chief administrator of Dalad Banner. He then went on to work in the Inner Mongolia regional bureau of statistics, then headed the Regional Bureau of Tourism.

Between 1993 and 1996, Yang served as the Inner Mongolia regional chief of the Communist Youth League of China under the League's first secretary Li Keqiang, who later became Premier. In 1998 Yang became CCP Committee Secretary of the regional capital, Hohhot, an office he occupied until 2003. Between 2003 and 2008 he served as the Chairman of Inner Mongolia and concurrently the region's CCP Deputy Committee Secretary, alongside CCP Committee Secretary Chu Bo. Yang shouldered major responsibility as Inner Mongolia Chairman when a turbine factory in Ulanqab League collapsed in July 2005, killing six workers. He left the office in 2008 to take up his new appointment in Beijing as the head of the State Ethnic Affairs Commission.

== Secretariat ==
Yang Jing earned a seat on the Secretariat of the Chinese Communist Party in November 2012, becoming the first ethnic-minority official to sit on the body in the party's history. Several months later at the 12th National People's Congress, Yang was appointed Secretary General of the State Council in Li Keqiang's cabinet. Yang's position was also unique in that State Council Secretaries-General did not usually hold concurrent seats on the CCP Secretariat. He was also the first ethnic-minority official to hold the State Council Secretary-General post.

Yang was a member of the 17th and 18th CCP Central Committees, and an alternate of the 16th CCP Central Committee. He has been named as a member of the tuanpai, an informal designation given to politicians with background in the Communist Youth League.

== After 19th Party Congress ==
In October 2017, at the 19th National Congress of the CCP, Yang Jing's name did not appear on the list of members of the 19th Central Committee of the Chinese Communist Party. As Yang had not yet reached retirement age (he was 63), this led to speculation that Yang came under scrutiny in a party disciplinary probe and was either demoted or otherwise no longer serving in an official capacity. Some of his party posts at the State Council were taken over by Xiao Jie.

=== Investigation ===
On February 24, 2018, Yang Jing was placed on one-year probation within the CCP, removal from his administrative post, and demoted from deputy state to ministerial level for violations of regulations. The Central Commission for Discipline Inspection said Yang "have severely violated political discipline and rules and had long-term improper association with illegal business owners and social personnel". The investigation found that "Yang also took advantage of his post to seek huge profits for others and accepted money and gifts through his relatives."

Government offices
Preceded by Uyunqimg	Chairman of Inner Mongolia; 2003–2008	Succeeded by Bagatur
Preceded by Li Dezhu	Director of the National Ethnic Affairs Commission; 2008–2013	Succeeded by Wang Zhengwei
Preceded by Ma Kai	Secretary General of the State Council; 2013–2018	Succeeded by Xiao Jie
