= Xu Yousheng =

Chinese politician

- 许又声
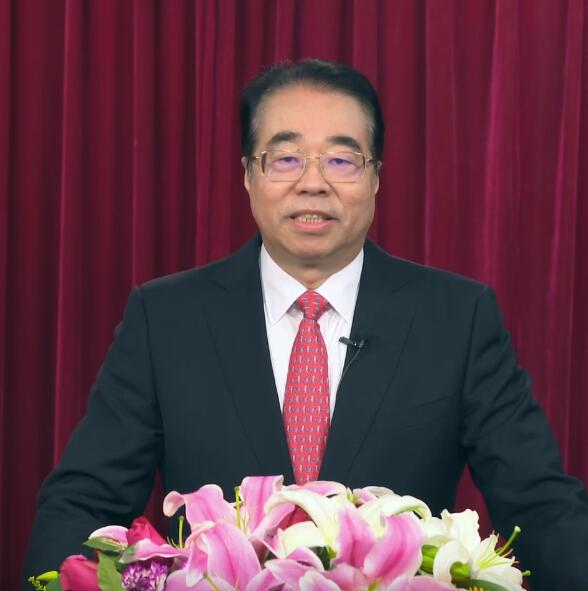
- Xu in 2020

Director of the Overseas Chinese Affairs Office of the State Council
- In office 2018–2022
- Premier: Li Keqiang
- Preceded by: Qiu Yuanping
- Succeeded by: Pan Yue

Personal details
- Born: August 1957 (age 68) Minqing County, Fujian, China
- Party: Chinese Communist Party
- Education: Xiamen University

Chinese name
- Simplified Chinese: 许又声
- Traditional Chinese: 許又聲
Transcriptions
Standard Mandarin
- Hanyu Pinyin: Xǔ Yòushēng

Xu Yousheng (Chinese: 许又声; born August 1957) is a Chinese politician. He is a representative of the 19th National Congress of the Chinese Communist Party and a member of the 19th Central Committee of the Chinese Communist Party.

== Biography ==
Xu was born in Minqing County, Fujian, in August 1957.

During the late Cultural Revolution, he was a sent-down youth in his home-county from 1975 to 1977. He worked at Fuzhou Rubber Factory for a year, After resuming the college entrance examination in 1978, he entered Xiamen University, majoring in Chinese language and literature. He joined the Chinese Communist Party (CCP) in November 1985. After graduating in 1982, he was assigned to the Secretary Bureau of the Overseas Chinese Affairs Office of the State Council, where he was eventually prompted to deputy director in 2001.

In 2012, he was appointed head of the Publicity Department of the CCP Hunan Provincial Committee and admitted to member of the Standing Committee of the CCP Hunan Provincial Committee, the province's top authority. He became secretary-general of the CCP Hunan Provincial Committee in 2015, but having held the position for one year. In 2016, he was made vice chairman of Hunan Provincial People's Congress.

In 2017, he was recalled to the original Overseas Chinese Affairs Office of the State Council as deputy director, and one year later became director, and concurrently serving as deputy head of the United Front Work Department of the CCP Central Committee.

Party political offices
Preceded by Lu Jianping	Head of the Publicity Department of the CCP Hunan Provincial Committee; 2012–2015	Succeeded by Zhang Wenxiong
Preceded by Han Yongwen	Secretary-General of the CCP Hunan Provincial Committee; 2015–2016	Succeeded by Sheng Ronghua
Government offices
Preceded by Qiu Yuanping	Director of the Overseas Chinese Affairs Office of the State Council; 2018–2020	Succeeded by Pan Yue
