= SinoVision =

Chinese-language television network in the United States

- Country: United States
- Broadcast area: Greater New York
- Headquarters: Midtown Manhattan, Manhattan, New York, NY

Programming
- Languages: English; Chinese

Ownership
- Parent: Asian Culture and Media Group
- Sister channels: Sino TV

History
- Launched: 1990
- Closed: Sep 1, 2024

Links
- Website: www.sinovision.net

Availability

Terrestrial
- Digital terrestrial television: Channel 63.3 (SinoVSN)
- Digital terrestrial television: Channel 63.4 (SinoVSN English)

Streaming media
- SinoVisionNet: www.sinovision.net
- Roku: APP

SinoVision (simplified Chinese: 美国中文电视; traditional Chinese: 美國中文電視; pinyin: Měiguó zhōngwén diànshì; Jyutping: Mei5gwok3 zung1man4 din6si6) was a U.S.-based Chinese language television network. SinoVision has offices in Lower Manhattan, Flushing, and Brooklyn. It has correspondents in Washington, D.C., Boston, Chicago, Los Angeles, San Francisco and Houston.

SinoVision was founded in 1990 by personnel dispatched to the U.S. from the Overseas Chinese Affairs Office (OCAO) and its China News Service to counter negative perceptions of the Chinese government following the 1989 Tiananmen Square protests and massacre. SinoVision is formally owned by Asian Culture and Media Group, which also owns the newspaper The China Press. According to academics Larry Diamond and Orville Schell, OCAO "set up the firm in the early 1990s but hid its financial role." According to Reporters Without Borders, SinoVision and The China Press are "discreetly controlled by the Chinese authorities and use content taken directly from China’s state media."

According to Larry Diamond and Orville Schell, "SinoVision’s content echoes China's official media. The vast majority of its stories about China, Sino-American relations, Taiwan, Hong Kong, and other important issues for the PRC government are taken directly from official Chinese media outlets or websites, including CCTV, Xinhua, and the People’s Daily."

In a letter to its advertisers on July 9, 2024, SinoVision announced that it would end its broadcasts on September 1, 2024.

On June 30, 2025. SinoVision sister channel, Sino TV ceased programming, as confirmed by Charter Spectrum and Verizon FiOS.

== See also ==
- The China Press
- China News Service
