= Overseas Chinese Affairs Office =

Bureau within the United Front Work Department of the Chinese Communist Party

- 国务院侨务办公室
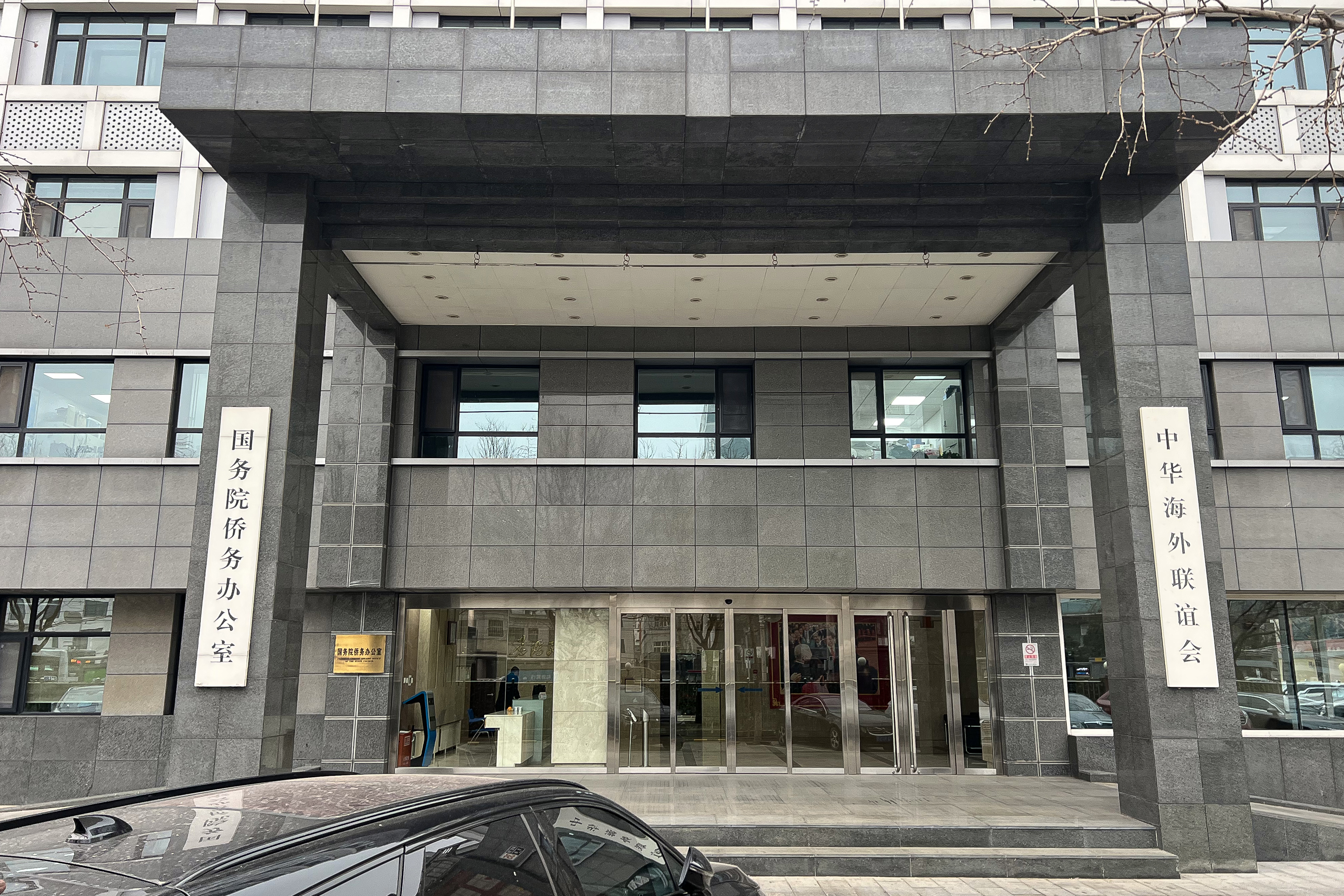

Agency overview
- Preceding agency: Committee of Overseas Chinese Affairs
- Status: External name of the United Front Work Department
- Headquarters: 35 Fuchengmenwai Street, Xicheng District, Beijing
- Agency executives: Chen Xu, Director; Xu Yousheng, Deputy Director
- Parent department: United Front Work Department
- Child agency: Chinese Overseas Exchange Association
- Website: www.gqb.gov.cn

Overseas Chinese Affairs Office of the State Council
- Simplified Chinese: 国务院侨务办公室
- Traditional Chinese: 國務院僑務辦公室
Transcriptions
Standard Mandarin
- Hanyu Pinyin: Guówùyuàn Qiáowù Bàngōngshì
Yue: Cantonese
- Jyutping: gwok3 mou6 jyun2 kiu4 mou6 baan6 gung1 sat1

The Overseas Chinese Affairs Office of the State Council (OCAO) is an external name of the United Front Work Department (UFWD) of the Central Committee of the Chinese Communist Party. The Committee of Overseas Chinese Affairs was established in 1949 and existed until 1970. In 1978, the Overseas Chinese Affairs Office was established. Prior to 2018, OCAO was an administrative office under the State Council responsible for liaising with and influencing overseas Chinese as part of its united front efforts. Following a series of institutional reforms in 2018, OCAO was merged into the UFWD, with its functions being taken up by the department. Under the arrangement "one institution with two names", UFWD reserves the name "Overseas Chinese Affairs Office of the State Council", generally used when dealing in public statements and dealing with the outside world regarding overseas Chinese affairs.

== History ==
OCAO's forerunner, the Committee of Overseas Chinese Affairs, was established in 1949; He Xiangning, the wife of Liao Zhongkai, served as its first head from October 1949 to April 1959, after which her son Liao Chengzhi took over the position of head until the abolishment of the office in June 1970. Upon the establishment of the Overseas Chinese Affairs Office in 1978, Liao Chengzhi also became its first head. Liao Chengzhi's son Liao Hui also joined the office as vice-director in 1983, and was promoted to director in May 1984.

In 1990, OCAO and China News Service personnel were dispatched to the U.S. to found SinoVision and The China Press to counter negative perceptions of the Chinese government following the 1989 Tiananmen Square protests and massacre.

OCAO has focused on technology transfer through agreements with professional associations in science and technology fields such as the Silicon Valley Chinese Overseas Business Association (SCOBA). OCAO also oversees the Chinese Overseas Exchange Association (COEA), which sponsored annual "Discovery Trips to China for Eminent Young Overseas Chinese". In 2009, the director of OCAO called on overseas Chinese to participate in local politics.

In October 2016, the Central Commission for Discipline Inspection reported deficiencies in the CCP's control over OCAO. In March 2018, it was announced that the OCAO and its functions, such as China News Service, would be merged into various internal bureaus of the United Front Work Department as well as the All-China Federation of Returned Overseas Chinese (ACFROC) as part of a series of institutional reforms, with the OCAO remaining as an external name of the UFWD.

In a 2022 ruling, a Canadian court stated that OCAO "engages in covert and surreptitious intelligence gathering". Canada has subsequently deported and barred OCAO agents from entry.

== Function ==
OCAO is tasked with conducting overseas Chinese (OC) affairs work or qiaowu as part of the united front system. According to James To, an academic at the Institute of the Pacific United:

Qiaowu is ostensibly a comprehensive effort that seeks to maintain, protect, and enhance the rights and interests of the OC. Tasks include propagating OC policies, promoting OC affairs, researching their needs, and resolving their problems. In practice, however, qiaowu works to legitimise and protect the CCP's hold on power, uphold China's international image, and retain influence over important channels of access to social, economic and political resources both domestically and abroad. To achieve this, qiaowu is conducted in view of two aims: to attract the OC back into the fold of the Chinese nation-state, and to convey and project to them the nation-state agenda. Implicit in these objectives is the elimination of potential threats and rival discourses that may challenge the CCP.

— James To, Beijing's Policies for Managing Han and Ethnic-Minority Chinese Communities Abroad

== Administration ==
=== Directors ===
| Name | Chinese name | Took office | Left office | Ref. |
|---|---|---|---|---|
| He Xiangning | 何香凝 | 1949 | 1959 | |
| Liao Chengzhi | 廖承志 | 1959 | 1983 | |
| Liao Hui | 廖晖 | 1984 | August 1997 | |
| Guo Dongpo | 郭东坡 | August 1997 | January 2003 | |
| Chen Yujie | 陈玉杰 | January 2003 | April 2007 | |
| Li Haifeng | 李海峰 | April 2007 | March 2013 | |
| Qiu Yuanping | 裘援平 | March 2013 | March 2018 | |
| Xu Yousheng | 许又声 | March 2018 | October 2020 | |
| Pan Yue | 潘岳 | 10 October 2020 | 24 June 2022 | |
| Chen Xu | 陈旭 | 24 June 2022 | Incumbent | |

== See also ==
- Conference for Friendship of Overseas Chinese Associations
- State Administration of Foreign Experts Affairs
