= Pan Yue (politician) =

Chinese government official

- 潘岳
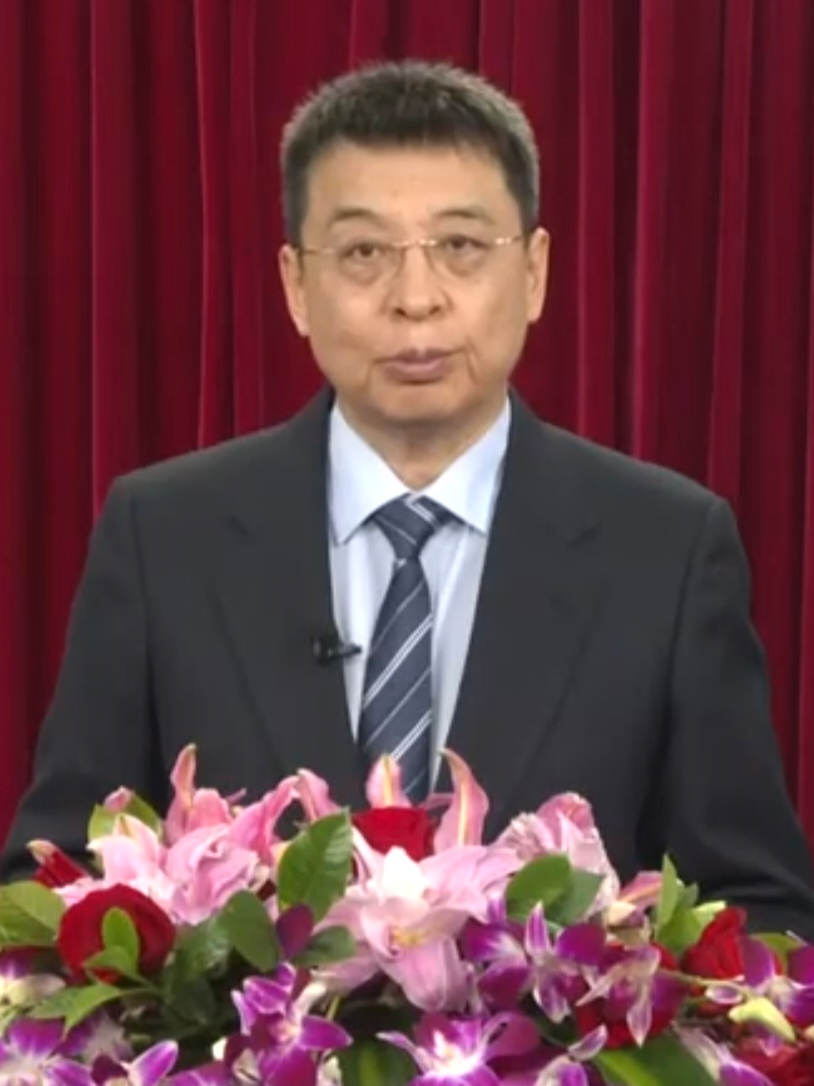
- Pan in 2021

Director of the National Ethnic Affairs Commission
- Incumbent
- Assumed office 24 June 2022
- Premier: Li Keqiang; Li Qiang
- Preceded by: Chen Xiaojiang

Deputy Head of the United Front Work Department
- Incumbent
- Assumed office October 2020
- Head: You Quan; Shi Taifeng

Director of the Overseas Chinese Affairs Office
- In office 10 October 2020 – 24 June 2022
- Premier: Li Keqiang
- Preceded by: Xu Yousheng
- Succeeded by: Chen Xu

Executive Vice President of the Central Institute of Socialism
- In office February 2016 – 6 July 2021
- Preceded by: Ye Xiaowen
- Succeeded by: Ji Lin

Personal details
- Born: April 1960 (age 66) Nanjing, Jiangsu, China
- Party: Chinese Communist Party
- Spouse: Liu Chaoying (divorced)
- Parent(s): Pan Tian; Zhou Lan
- Education: Zhejiang University; Renmin University of China; Central China Normal University

Military service
- Allegiance: People's Republic of China
- Branch/service: People's Liberation Army Ground Force
- Years of service: 1976–1982
- Unit: 38th Group Army; 13th Division of PLA Railway Corps

Pan Yue (Chinese: 潘岳; pinyin: Pān Yuè; born April 1960) is a Chinese government official who is the current director of the National Ethnic Affairs Commission and a deputy head of the United Front Work Department.

He is recognized as an environmental activist who led notable campaigns to underscore the intensity of climate change by challenging the main constituents of air pollution and greenhouse emissions. He advocated for the advancement of technology and resources to address environmental issues. In 2003, Pan would become the first-ranked deputy director at the State Environmental Protection Administration (SEPA) which would then go on to become the Ministry of Environmental Protection. In August 2015, Pan was appointed as the deputy secretary of the Ministry of Environmental Protection, a position that had been empty since 2007. Pan would later leave this position to serve as the executive vice president of the Central Institute of Socialism, a position he would serve from 2016 to 2021.

Pan became an alternative member of the Central Committee of the Chinese Communist Party in 2021, also becoming a deputy head of the United Front Work Department of the CCP and director of the Overseas Chinese Affairs Office. On 24 June 2022, he left his duties as the OCAO director, instead being appointed as head of the National Ethnic Affairs Commission. He was promoted to become a full member of the Central Committee after the 20th CCP National Congress in October 2022.

== Early life ==
Pan Yue was born in April 1960 in Nanjing City, Jiangsu, one of China's most important and autonomous cities and home to one of the world's largest inland ports, to Pan Tian, former deputy chief of staff and chief engineer of the Railway Corps Command, a Quasi Chinese military force, and military medic Zhou Lan.

Pans first years of adulthood were spent during the era of Deng Xiaoping. This era oversaw the massive expansion of the Chinese economy as well as a period of cultural exchange between the West and China along the coastal regions of China. This cultural exchange brought with it many new ideas and concepts to China during Yue's educational years.

Pan Yue followed in his father's footsteps and enlisted in military service, serving in the former 38th Group Army and the former 13th Division of the PLA Railway Corps. Pan's service in the PLA ended in 1982 and he shortly afterward worked a myriad of jobs and positions. 1982–1986 he worked as a data officer for the Economic Daily and the lead reporter for the China Environment Journal. From 1986 to 1988 Pan worked as a deputy director at the Research Office of State Air Traffic Control Bureau, secretary at the Communist Youth League of China (CYLC), chief in the International Department of Fangshan District, and as deputy director of the Foreign Trade and Economic Cooperation Committee of Fangshan District. From December 1988 to December 1989, Pan served as deputy editor-in-chief of China Technical Supervision Newspaper. From December 1989 to February 1993, he served as deputy editor-in-chief of China Youth Daily, the newspaper outlet of the Communist Youth League of China and one of the most widely distributed and read newspapers in China. He then went on to serve as a deputy director and member of the Party Leadership Group of the Economic System Reform Office of the State Council from the years 2000 to 2003. By the age of 34 Pan was noted to have ascended to deputy-minister ranks, an uncommon feat given his relatively young age when compared to other Chinese ministers.

During his time as the deputy director of the Economic Restructuring Office, Pan was under the leadership of premier Zhu Rongji. Zhu Rongji had garnered a reputation as a highly competent administrator that was intolerant of governmental corruption and was willing to cut through government bureaucracy in the name of transparency. While working with Zhu, Pan came to be seen as a protégé of the premier.

Many of the jobs and positions Panheld during the years of 1994–2003 were under the purview of the State-owned Assets Supervision and Administration Commission (SASAC), which is a special commission that is under the direct oversight of the state council. The SASAC is responsible for managing the state-owned enterprises (SOE) in China.

As deputy head of the Ministry of Environmental Protection, formerly known as SEPA, Pan was responsible for the task of protecting China's climate and the environment from pollution and contamination be it air, water, and land. The Ministry of Environmental Protection also holds jurisdiction and oversight of China's nuclear safety agency.

== Early political and environmental activism ==
In 2003, Pan circulated an internal document titled Thoughts on the Transformation from a Revolutionary Party to a Party in Power at the Economic Restructuring Office of the State Council. Pan's internal document was criticized by Liberals for failing to reassess the 1989 Tiananmen Square protests while and Conservatives labeled him as "China's Yeltsin" for disruption of standard party politics.

After the September 11th attacks in the United States which initiated the war on terror, Pan urged officials and authorities within China to break with the Communist Party's traditional hostility towards religion.

Pan's Green GDP idea was supported in 2004 by the sitting General Secretary of the Chinese Communist Party, Hu Jintao "We need not only GDP, but also green GDP." Green GDP was rolled out in 10 provinces and cities across China but was met with local resistance. In 2006 Green GDP programs and research were halted and In 2015 Green GDP research was restarted by the Ministry of Ecology and Environment.

Pan was described by Businessweekly online in 2005 as "a courageous voice for a greener China" stating that "Pan has taken on some of China's biggest industries over their pollution records and forced them to clean up." In the same year, Pan stated that China's immense GDP growth had come at the cost of its natural resources and environmental stability and further claimed that the GDP growth would be unable to keep up with the increasing environmental costs.

In 2006 in an interview with Zhou Jigang that was published under the title "The rich consume, and the poor suffer the pollution" on the China Dialogue website, Yue stated that one of the fundamental causes of the ongoing environmental crisis was the global capitalist system. "Developed countries account for 15% of the world's population yet use over 85% of its resources. They raise their own environmental standards and transfer resource-intensive and polluting industries to developing nations; they establish a series of green barriers and bear as little environmental responsibility as is possible." He spoke.

On March 31, 2007, during an Environmental rally at the Badaling Great Wall in Beijing which saw Pan invite cultural celebrities to plant trees at the base of the Great Wall, a massive sand and dust storm attacked Pan and other attendees.

During the mid-2000's Pan's green policies came to the forefront of Chinese politics and industry when he as acting vice deputy of the Ministry of Environmental protection ordered the closure of 30 energy projects, around US$14 Billion investment for a failure to comply with the Environmental Impact Assessments.

Pan personally joined with both non-government organizations and journalists to expose the environmental wrongdoings committed by many Chinese companies. Pan is an advocate of environmental transparency and introduced a new information law that required authorities to release the pollution data of corporations and companies to the general public. Pan's environmental campaign saw the closure of many investments, he was apparently sidelined by the Chinese government for slowing their economic development and he suffered a setback to his popularity and prominence.

As deputy director of China's State Environmental Protection Administration, he was an active proponent of the Eco-Socialist Theory and cited its importance in championing environmentalism in China. This granted him global acclaim and he was nominated for the Person of the year award in 2007 by The New Statesman, a British magazine company that focuses on current affairs. Pan stated that China's Miracle GDP growth from the 70s and 80s is being reversed due to the environmental damage he is working to counter.

During Pan's time at the Environmental Protection Ministry as acting deputy director, Pan earned the nickname "Hurricane Pan", a reference to the vast quantity of high-profile campaigns he waged against China's worst polluters. In a 2008 interview, Pan stated that the environmental laws in China are on record but go virtually unenforced due to a lack of ecological culture; This problem is something Pan hopes to remedy through the revival of some of the founding principles of traditional Chinese culture, that being the harmony between humans and their environment. During his time as "Hurricane Pan", Pan also popularized the idea of "Green GDP", a system of economics that takes into account the short and long-term monetary costs of releasing pollutants into the environment. Under Pan's Green GDP campaign he launched an environmental crackdown on some of China's most powerful state-owned enterprises such as Huaneng Power, Huadian Energy, and Datang International Power Generation.

During his campaign, Pan revealed that "China's energy consumption per unit of GDP was a magnitude higher than that of its economic rivals. It was seven times that of Japan, six times that of the US, and 2.8 times that of India. Pan remarked that China's emissions were over 10 times the world's average and its labor efficiency was only a tenth of other developed nations". China's emissions fueled the ongoing environmental crisis in China that resulted in "One-third of China's land has been polluted with acid rain… 300 million rural residents do not have access to clean water" according to Pan. The inability of the average Chinese citizen is supported by a recent study that supported the notion that In China, only 14% of water usage goes to the basic needs of hydration, sanitation, hygiene, and cooking. The other 86% reportedly fuels China's industrial and agricultural needs. In support of Pan's statement about the limited access to China is government data which indicates that approximately only 60% of China's surface water is fit for human consumption.

In a 2006 article titled the "environment needs public participation" published by Pan states that despite the clear and strict anti-pollution laws put into place by the Chinese government they are not observed and go unenforced. "Many in government and business are devoted to short-term profit, and officials are solely motivated by the prospect of an increase in GDP. None of them pay adequate attention to environmental protection." he said. Pan's concerns were echoed by Wang Canfa of the China University of Political Science and Law who was one of the creators of the new Environmental Protection laws. Wang believes the biggest problem could lie with the courts and wants supervision to ensure that they really do accept and hear appropriate cases. Some courts might be reluctant for fear of getting into trouble, Wang said: "They may feel the defendants, probably polluting companies or government agencies, will be hard to deal with."

In 2007 Pan published "Thoughts on Environmental Issues" which discussed his plans for environmental protection, government performance evaluations, and an environmental information disclosure program that would require the government to release public pollution and environmental information.

In the same year, Pan said that an environmental tax was at the top of the Chinese government's agenda and encouraged all Chinese corporations and companies to buy environmental insurance.

In a 2007 article published by Pan titled "Green China and Young China" he says that environmental protection cannot be advanced by the State Environmental Protection Administration (SEPA) alone. It requires action from the whole of society. Pan also discusses the environmental injustice within the Chinese state, remarking that those big industries like coal mining often extract the natural resources of a province, leaving it heavily polluted and then leaving before they can be negatively affected by the damage. Pan said to a journalist, "China's environmental pollution record when its GDP was 400 to 1000 U.S. dollars was comparable to a developed country whose GDP was between 3,000 to 10,000 U.S. dollars. Yue calls on China to join with eco-socialists and left-wing organizations around the world in order to limit the transfer of pulling industries to China by Multinational corporations.

In 2007 Pan had a sharp change in policy regarding environmental protection. Pan ended his harsh crackdowns on China's polluters and instead as acting deputy director of China's State Environmental Protection Administration (SEPA), proposed seven new green economic policies in a speech to the China Green Forum on September 9, 2007. Pan explained this strategy change stating that the crackdowns had not worked as well as hoped and "that it's a great shame to find ourselves in this situation. Legal crackdowns have resulted in nothing more than a tug of war." When asked about the Green Policy rollout in China, Pan commented saying that the competing powers and interests of the government, regions, and industries are slowing the environmental policy rollout.

=== Political reemergence ===
In 2010 Pan received the Ramon Magsaysay Award "for his bold pursuit of a national environmental program, insisting on state and private accountability, encouraging state-citizen dialogue, and raising the environment as an issue of urgent national concern.""

In 2014 after the passing of a new Environment Protection law that would severely punish China's biggest polluters in an attempt to curtail carbon emissions Pan voiced concerns about its enforcement. Yue in a Monday interview with Xinhua said the new "powerful" law could still fail without ironclad enforcement.

Pan spoke on the punishment for officials who failed to comply with the new Environment Protection law saying that "Officials who are found to have approved illegal projects, covered up illegal behavior, failed to act in time after public tips, forged monitoring data, and failed to disclose environmental information that should be publicized by law will face punishments such as demotion, removal from their posts and losing their jobs."

Pan spearheaded the new Environment Protection law that went into effect on January 1, 2015. During the first two months of the year, 15 polluting companies were hit with daily fines, the largest one paying a total of 1.9 million yuan ($303,000). Yue commented on this stating that the fines represented a "good beginning of the revised law." Pan and other environmental authorities ordered more than 120 polluting companies to stop polluting, even if that means suspending production. Pan went on record saying that "the companies have complained that the tough measures are suffocating them, but the penalties will work to force companies to adopt new technologies."

In 2015 Pan publicly called for China to take on the growing climate crisis stating that "At the moment we are glad that the United States is still number one in carbon emissions, which leaves us a strong standing point... however, it is highly likely that China will be the number one carbon emission country in that time [in 2015]; everyone will be watching us then." Pan's statement about China taking on the growing climate crisis was echoed by Chinese leader Xi Jinping in his opening remarks at the 2015 Paris climate accords. Xi Jinping released a statement on China's intentions to combat the crisis stating that "Going forward, ecological endeavors will feature prominently in China's 13th Five-Year Plan. China will work hard to implement the vision of innovative, coordinated, green, open, and inclusive development. China will, on the basis of technological and institutional innovation, adopt new policy measures to improve the industrial mix, build low-carbon energy system, develop green building and low-carbon transportation, and build a nation-wide carbon emission trading market so as to foster a new." At this Conference Xi Jinping also pledged that China will reach peak emissions by the year 2030.

In March 2016, Pan left the Environmental Protection Department, a department where he had worked for the last 13 years. His departure coincided with his 2016 promotion to executive vice president of the Central Institute of Socialism, something which ascended him to provincial-ministerial ranks of government. Under Pan, the Central Institute of Socialism launched its first thinktank. This Think tank's research includes: collaborative democracy research, the study of the sense of community in the Chinese nation, and the study of social organizations' role in social governance, all concept deemed essential to China's development and stability.

=== Last years as environmental protection minister ===
In 2015 as vice-minister of the Ministry of Environmental Protection, Pan oversaw the inspection of industries involving chemicals and other dangerous substances. This inspection was launched in response to the two explosions that occurred on August 12 at a warehouse in Tianjin Port. The warehouse stored large quantities of toxic chemicals, including 700 tons of Sodium Cyanide, and the death toll from the explosion was over 160

In 2015 after China passed the amendment to the Air Pollution Control Law, which leveled more restrictions on the sources of smog, and increased the amount of environmental information available to the public, Pan as vice minister of the Ministry of Environmental Protection vowed to further reduce China's air pollution. Pan said that "there are many factors that have an influence on air quality, therefore, total emission regulation is needed… Pollution reduction measures should not just focus on industry," he said, "urging efforts to reduce vehicle emissions and agriculture discharge."

In 2015, Pan at the age of 55, as deputy minister of the Ministry of Environmental Protection oversaw the environmental impact assessments.

Pan returned to the forefront of politics again in 2015 when the Chinese media announced that Pan had been promoted to the position of deputy secretary of the MEP and was now in charge of handling all Environmental impact assessments

As head of the Academy of Chinese Culture, Pan has stated that the Chinese path will provide a win-win cooperation nation for the globe and end Hegemonic conflict.

In 2018 at the fifth China Beijing International Fair for Trade in Services. After Russia and China has deals to further cooperate in medical treatment, property investment, education, tourism, and culture, Pan spoke, saying that "With changes in health concepts and medical models, TCM plays an important role in treating various diseases and has been widely recognized by society."

At a 2019 Forum on the Chinese civilization and China's path held in Beijing, Pan expressed the belief that China's path is deeply rooted in its civilization and has provided an institutional model for the modernization of developing countries. Yue's comments supported the reports of increased Chinese investment in 1st and 2nd world countries as between 2001 and 2018, China loaned approximately $126 billion to African countries. Between 2001 and 2018, China invested $4.

On November 19, 2020, at the Conference on Overseas Chinese Pioneering and Developing in China held in Wuhan, the capital city of Central China's Hubei province, Pan praised China's efforts in modernization and industrialization.

== Central Committee membership ==
In 2021 Pan was elected as an alternate of the 19th Central Committee of the Chinese Communist Party. In 2021–2022, Pan was the agency director of the Overseas Chinese Affairs Office (OCAO) of the State Council. In this position, Pan would review, create, and study any and all policies directly related to overseas Chinese activity as well as manage and coordinate any departments or social organizations that are relevant to overseas Chinese activity. He was also appointed as a deputy head of the United Front Work Department of the CCP in 2021, succeeding Xu Yousheng, a former sent-down youth of the Cultural Revolution.

In 2022, with Pan as director, the OCAO came into conflict with the Canadian government, which ruled that it was guilty of conducting espionage against overseas Chinese populations and other minorities.

In a 2021 speech, Pan praised the Chinese government for its international economic and diplomatic success regarding the Regional Comprehensive Economic Partnership (RCEP) for 15 Asia-Pacific countries and the China-EU Investment Agreement as having upheld the principles of multilateralism and free trade. In 2021 and 2022, Pan gave speeches to both domestic and overseas Chinese persons in the preparation for the upcoming Chinese new year that remarked on the impact of the COVID-19 pandemic and Chinese resilience. The 2022 speech discussed the Chinese Communist Party's fulfillment of its first centennial goal, and the importance of overseas Chinese persons in the continued existence of the CCP through their defense of China in the Japanese invasion during the Second World War as well as their contributions to rapid Chinese economic growth.

On 24 June 2022, he was appointed as the director of the National Ethnic Affairs Commission (NEAC). He was promoted to become a full member of the Central Committee after the 20th CCP National Congress in October 2022.

== Political positions ==
Pan is a believer in the concept of ecological civilization and ecological socialism. From a Marxist perspective, the dynamics of capitalism are seen as the driving force behind global ecological devastation and minimal efforts to avert it. Pan reaffirmed these beliefs in 2016 when as acting vice-minister of China's State Environmental Protection Administration he proclaimed that Marxist theory should be used to combat lifestyles that threaten ecological civilization, and that socialism was more likely to provide the necessary motivation and security to an ecological civilization to occur. Pan has enjoyed much intellectual support in this position from many others including Huan Qingzhi from the Research Institute of Marxism, Peking University; Pan Jiahua, director of the Institute for Urban and Environmental Studies at the Chinese Academy of Social Sciences, and Lu Feng from Tsinghua University.

During his time as vice-minister of environmental protection from 2008 to 2015, Pan noted that local and provincial governments often subverted environmental laws and openly protected their biggest corporate polluters. Pan went on to say that China's rapid GDP growth was copied off of western models and as a result, the environmental issues that occurred in Europe during their 100 years of GDP growth have been condensed down to 20 in China. Pan stated that "While becoming the world leader in GDP growth and foreign investment, we have also become the world's number one consumer of coal, oil, and steel – and the largest producer of CO2 and chemical oxygen demand (COD) emissions."

Under Pan's direction of the NEAC, calls for "ethnic fusion" of all non-Han ethnic minorities became louder. Pan is a critic of what he calls "Western multicultural theories."

In 2024, the Pan-edited textbook An Introduction to the Community of the Zhonghua Race (中华民族共同体概论) was rolled out and made compulsory for all university students in the country. The textbook advocates for further integration of the country's ethnic minorities and criticizes prior policies of "ethnic minority exceptionalism."

== Personal life ==
Pan Yue is a lover of the liberal arts and a known poet. Yue has published "Selected Poems of Pan Yue", and a personal essay titled "Holding Up the Grassland". He holds a doctorate in history and is an associate researcher. He was formerly married to Liu Chaoying, the daughter of General Liu Huaqing who was a former vice-chairman of the Central Military Commission. His former wife Liu Chaoying was at the center of the 1996 United States campaign finance controversy in which there was an alleged effort by China to influence domestic American politics. Friends have described Pan as different from the standard politicians calling him an informal and unstuffy figure who is imaginative and determined.

Educational offices
Preceded by Ye Xiaowen	Executive Vice President of the Central Institute of Socialism; 2016–2021	Succeeded by Ji Lin
Government offices
Preceded by Xu Yousheng	Director of the Overseas Chinese Affairs Office; 2020–2022	Succeeded by Chen Xu
Preceded by Chen Xiaojiang	Director of the National Ethnic Affairs Commission; 2022–present	Incumbent
