= The China Press =

Chinese-language newspaper published in the United States

- Owner: Asian Culture and Media Group (Ya Zhou Wen Hua Enterprises Limited N.Y.)
- Founded: 1990; 36 years ago
- Political alignment: Chinese Communist Party
- Language: Chinese (in Simplified Chinese characters)
- Headquarters: 15 East 40th Street; New York, NY 10016; U.S.
- ISSN: 1051-0125
- OCLC number: 21743712
- Website: www.qiaobaous.com

The China Press (Chinese: 侨报), commonly called Qiaobao, is a pro-Chinese Communist Party (CCP) Chinese-language newspaper published in the United States. It covers general interest topics with an emphasis on news about the United States and China, and publishes daily and weekly editions.

== History ==
The China Press was founded in 1990 by personnel dispatched to the U.S. from the Overseas Chinese Affairs Office (OCAO) under China's State Council and its China News Service to counter negative perceptions of the Chinese government following the 1989 Tiananmen Square protests and massacre.

The China Press is formally owned by Asian Culture and Media Group, which also owns SinoVision. The parent of Ya Zhou Wen Hua Enterprises Limited (N.Y.) is Hong Kong's Ya Zhou Wen Hua Enterprises Ltd, established by OCAO as a front before the 1997 handover of Hong Kong to the People's Republic of China. The Hong Kong company also owns Nouvelles d’Europe (歐洲時報), the latter being the largest overseas Chinese media network in Europe linked to the CCP's United Front Work Department (UFWD). All five shareholders of the Hong Kong company are linked to the UFWD or OCAO.

According to Reporters Without Borders, The China Press and SinoVision are "discreetly controlled by the Chinese authorities and use content taken directly from China's state media." According to academics Larry Diamond and Orville Schell, OCAO "set up the firm in the early 1990s but hid its financial role."

Former China News Service journalist, Xie Yining, served as chairman of The China Press until his killing by another newspaper employee, Zhong Qi Chen, in 2018.

According to academic Wanning Sun, The China Press, along with The Epoch Times, World Journal, Sing Tao, and Ming Pao, are the major newspapers serving overseas Chinese communities in the United States and Canada. As of 2020, The China Press reached more than 100,000 Chinese readers across at least 15 major cities in the United States, including Los Angeles, San Francisco, Chicago, New York, Houston, Boston, and Washington, DC.

Unlike other newspapers linked to Chinese state media, The China Press has been noted as not having registered under the Foreign Agents Registration Act (FARA).

== Reception ==
=== Chinese Communist Party influence ===
A 2001 report on Chinese media censorship by the Jamestown Foundation cited The China Press as one of four major overseas Chinese newspapers directly or indirectly controlled by the Chinese government.

The dominant Chinese media vehicle in America is the newspaper," wrote the report's lead author Mei Duzhe. "Four major Chinese newspapers are found in the U.S.—World Journal, Sing Tao Daily, Ming Pao Daily News, and The China Press. Of these four, three are either directly or indirectly controlled by the government of Mainland China, while the fourth (run out of Taiwan) has recently begun bowing to pressure from the Beijing government.

Other scholars and journalists have noted pro-Chinese Communist Party content in The China Press. Its take on China-related topics tends to align with state media inside China, and its content often appears on mainland Chinese state news sites.

== See also ==
- United front (China)
