= Chen Xu (politician) =

Chinese Communist Party politician (born 1963)

- 陈旭
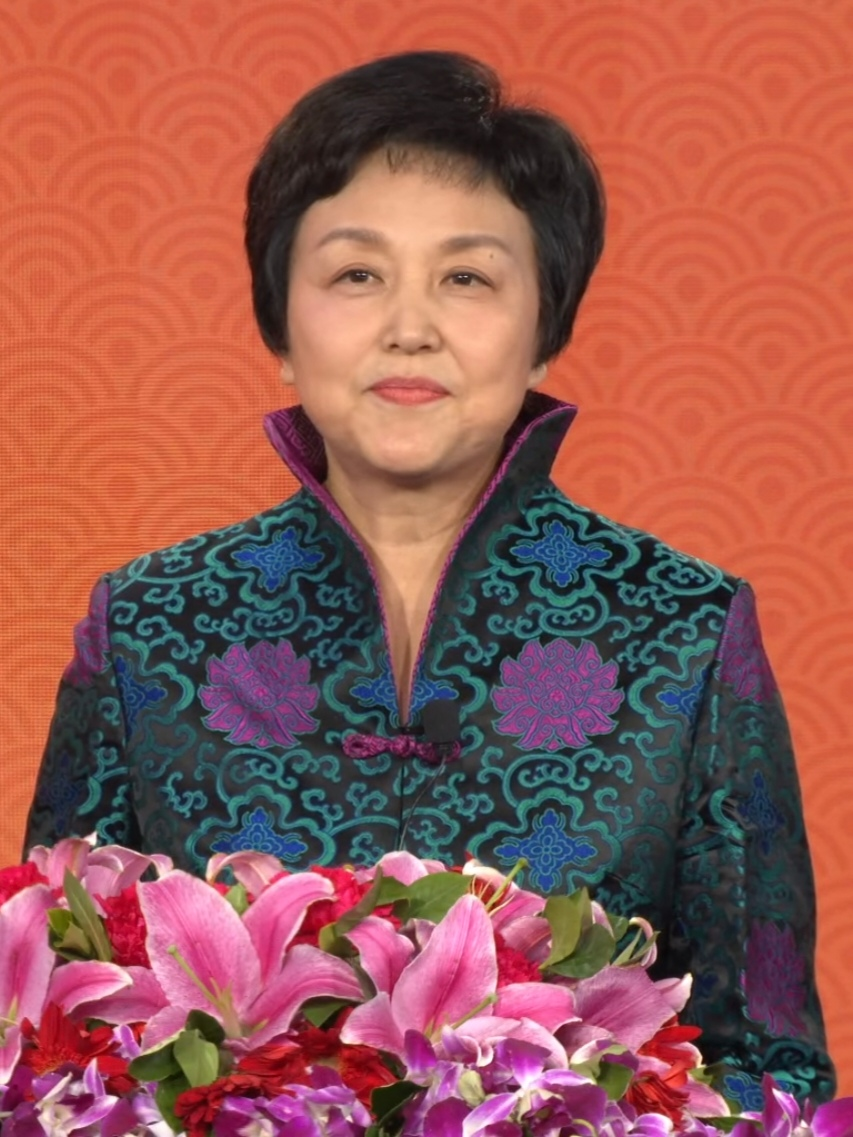
- Chen in 2024

Director of the Overseas Chinese Affairs Office
- Incumbent
- Assumed office 24 June 2022
- Premier: Li Keqiang
- Preceded by: Pan Yue

Deputy Head of the United Front Work Department
- Incumbent
- Assumed office February 2022
- Head: You Quan; Shi Taifeng

Communist Party Secretary of Tsinghua University
- In office 30 December 2013 – 25 February 2022
- President: Chen Jining; Qiu Yong
- Preceded by: Hu Heping
- Succeeded by: Qiu Yong

Personal details
- Born: 1 July 1963 (age 63) Baoding, Hebei, China
- Party: Chinese Communist Party
- Education: Tsinghua University

Chinese name
- Simplified Chinese: 陈旭
- Traditional Chinese: 陳旭
Transcriptions
Standard Mandarin
- Hanyu Pinyin: Chén Xù

Chen Xu (Chinese: 陈旭; born 1 July 1963) is a Chinese politician and the current deputy head of the Chinese Communist Party's United Front Work Department and director of the Overseas Chinese Affairs Office, in office since 2022. Previously she served as the CCP committee secretary of Tsinghua University. She was an alternate the 19th Central Committee of the Chinese Communist Party and is a member of the 20th Central Committee.

== Biography ==
Chen was born in Baoding, Hebei province on 1 July 1963. In 1981, she was accepted to Tsinghua University, majoring in electronics. After graduation, she stayed and worked at the university. She joined the Chinese Communist Party (CCP) in January 1984. She was named deputy party secretary in February 2006. She moved up the ranks to become vice-president in December 2007 and executive deputy party secretary in June 2009. In December 2013, she was elevated to party secretary of Tsinghua University, a position at vice-ministerial level.

In February 2022, she was transferred to the United Front Work Department and appointed deputy head. In June, she concurrently serves as director of the Overseas Chinese Affairs Office, succeeding Pan Yue.

Party political offices
Preceded by Hu Heping	Communist Party Secretary of Tsinghua University; 2013–2022	Succeeded by Qiu Yong
Government offices
Preceded by Pan Yue	Director of the Overseas Chinese Affairs Office; 2022–present	Incumbent
