= World Journal =

Chinese language broadsheet newspaper published in North America

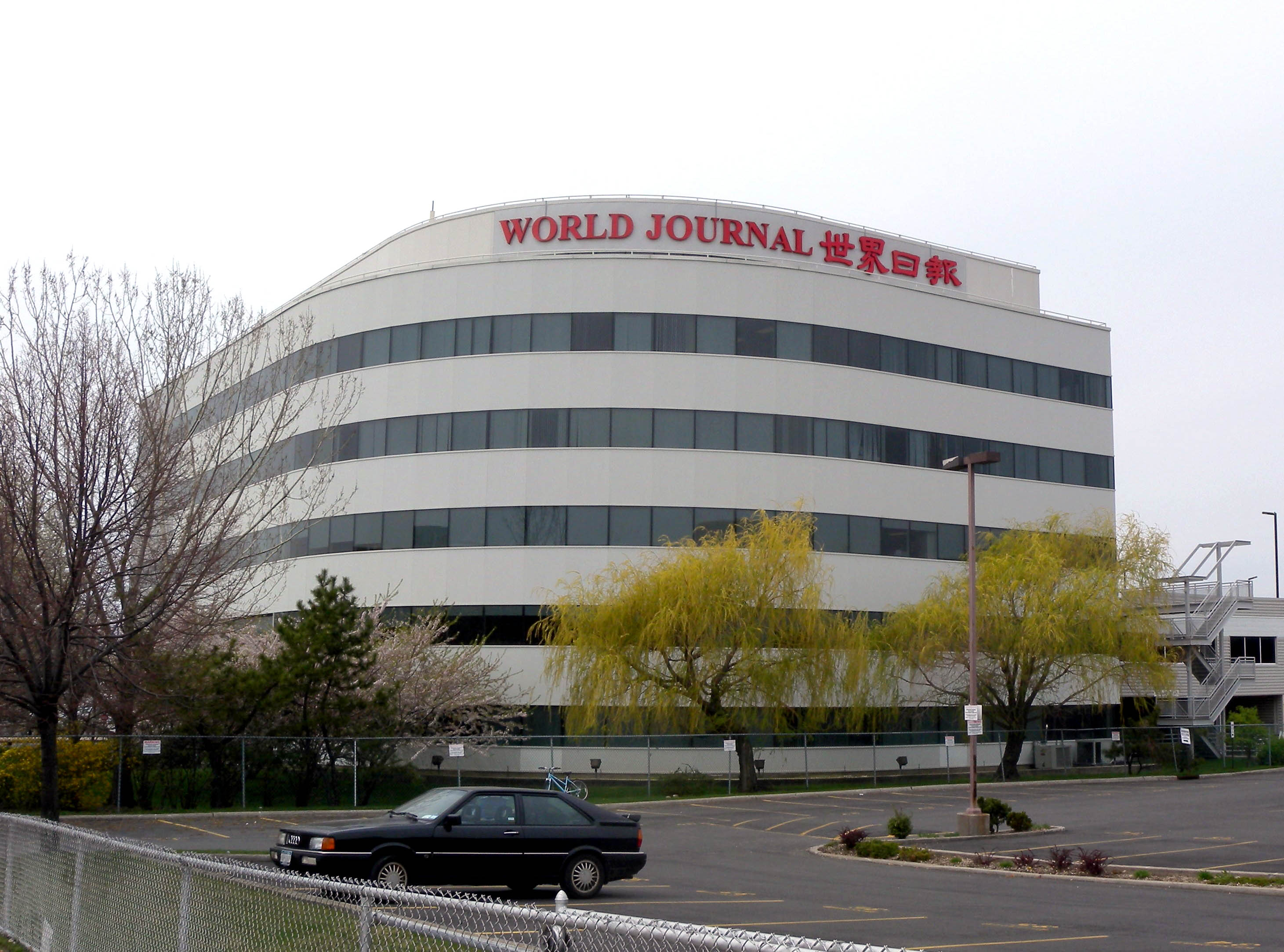
- Type: Daily newspaper
- Format: Broadsheet
- Owner: United Daily News
- Founded: 1976
- Political alignment: Pan-Blue
- Language: Chinese
- Headquarters: Whitestone, New York, United States
- Website: www.worldjournal.com

World Journal
- Traditional Chinese: 世界日報
- Simplified Chinese: 世界日报
Transcriptions
Standard Mandarin
- Hanyu Pinyin: Shìjiè Rìbào
- Wade–Giles: Shihchieh Jihpao
- Tongyong Pinyin: Shìhiè Rìhbào
- Yale Romanization: Shr̀jyè R̀bàu
- IPA: [ʂɻ̩̂tɕjê ɻɻ̩̂pâʊ]
Yue: Cantonese
- Yale Romanization: Saigaai Yahtbou
- Jyutping: Sai3 gaai3 jat6 bou3
- IPA: [sɐ̄ikāːi jɐ̀tpōu]

World Journal (Chinese: 世界日報; pinyin: Shìjiè Rìbào) is a Taiwanese broadsheet newspaper published in North America. It is the largest Chinese language newspaper in the United States and one of the largest Chinese-language newspapers outside of Greater China, with a daily circulation of 350,000. The newspaper is headquartered in the Whitestone neighborhood of Queens in New York City.

World Journal is published in major cities in the United States with large overseas Chinese populations, including New York, Los Angeles, San Francisco, and Chicago, as well as cities in Canada, including Vancouver and Toronto. The publication is widely sold in many Chinatowns and major suburbs.

== History ==
The newspaper was established on February 12, 1976 in New York and San Francisco. The World Journal is one of three major Chinese-language dailies among the Chinese American community. The publication is owned by the same media conglomerate that runs the United Daily News in Taiwan and carries a significant Taiwanese American administrative presence. Until the mid-1990s, it was viewed as hostile to the People's Republic of China, in part because the paper referred to people from mainland China as "Communist Chinese". Furthermore, its coverage on mainland China usually comprised only one article or so each day out of dozens of pages and sections.

However, the newspaper has changed since it began increasing its coverage of mainland China. Following the 1989 Tiananmen Square protests and massacre, such coverage increased to two pages per day. While the paper still attempts to maintain an anti-communist stance, it has become increasingly sensitive to the tastes of its large Chinese immigrant readership which has grown since the 1990s with the expanded access to permanent resident green cards in the United States following the 1989 Tiananmen Square protests and massacre. Another reason for the shift was rooted in the newspaper's sympathy for the Chinese democracy movement.

Like its parent, the United Daily News, the World Journal is widely seen as taking an editorial line that favors the Pan-Blue coalition and the Kuomintang. Consequently, this editorial position has made it much less hostile toward the People's Republic since the 1990s. Immediately after the Tiananmen Square protests of 1989, the newspaper no longer referred indiscriminately to all mainland Chinese as "Communist Chinese", and additionally praised pro-democracy efforts on the mainland. During the mid-1990s, it began to give credit to the positive progress made in mainland China, and by the late-1990s, it began to criticize wrongdoings within the Chinese democracy movement and in the West in the same manner with which it criticizes corruption within the Chinese communist regime. After 2000, there has also been an increase in the representation of mainland Chinese immigrants on the newspaper's reporting staff, and the paper has published readers' letters voicing different views from the pro-Taiwan independence stance that have also made it popular among mainland Chinese immigrants to the United States.

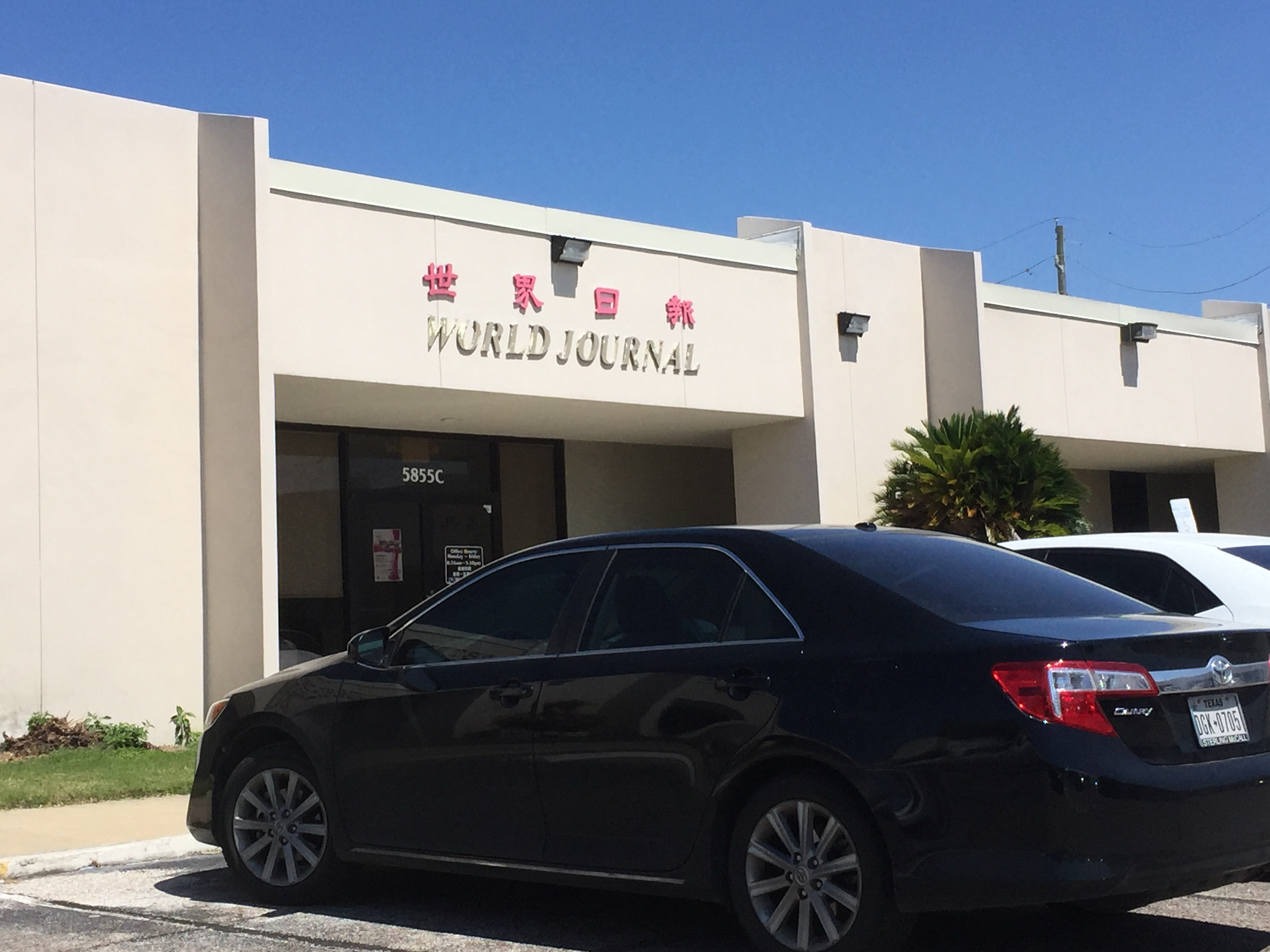
The offices in Chinatown, Houston (Greater Sharpstown)

World Journal ceased publication in Canada on January 1, 2016, to better focus its business in the United States.

== Controversies ==
=== Alleged ties to the Chinese Communist Party ===
According to a 2001 report by the Jamestown Foundation, World Journal was one of the four major Chinese newspapers found in the U.S. that "has recently begun bowing to pressure from the Beijing government." The other three which were Sing Tao Daily, Ming Pao Daily News, and The China Press had already been "either directly or indirectly controlled by the government of Mainland China". The report referenced an instance of self-censorship by World Journal in its efforts to develop business ties with the People's Republic of China in which Chinese consulates in both New York and San Francisco have pressured the paper's local offices not to publish ads related to Falun Gong. The New York office reportedly acquiesced in full and did not publish the ads, while the San Francisco office acquiesced in part by burying the ads among the paper's least viewed pages. Conversely, Jason Q. Ng of China Digital Times and Citizen Lab considered World Journal in 2013 to be relatively critical of PRC policies.

=== Labor law violation ===
On January 10, 2007, a Southern California jury found the Monterey Park-based Chinese Daily News responsible for failing to give employees breaks, lunches, and overtime, and awarded the plaintiffs $2.5 million. The plaintiffs alleged that they worked over twelve hours per day, were not provided accurate pay statements, and were unfairly interfered with during unionization attempts. In 2001, the employees voted to join the Communication Workers of America, but the National Labor Relations Board vacated the union vote after finding that the election was tainted. The Chinese Daily News appealed the ruling in the district court, with proceedings held in the U.S. Court of Appeals for the Ninth Circuit and the U.S. Supreme Court.

In 2011, after the U.S. Supreme Court decided Dukes v. Wal-Mart, the U.S. Supreme Court remanded the case back to the Ninth Circuit for reconsideration in light of Dukes. On September 13, 2013, the Ninth Circuit Court of Appeals rejected the district court's grant of class certification under Federal Rules of Civil Procedure (FRCP) Rule 23(b)(3). Upon remand at the district court level, Plaintiffs once again moved for class certification, and the district court recertified the class.

Chinese Daily News thereafter filed a FRCP Rule 23(f) Petition to Appeal, which the Ninth Circuit granted on August 22, 2014. In 2016, the Chinese Daily News agreed to pay $7.8 million to former and current employees in a settlement. The Los Angeles area-based Chinese Daily News was later amalgamated into the New York City-headquartered World Journal.

=== Discrimination against breastfeeding women ===
On October 21, 2013, World Journal published a controversial article that allegedly discriminated against breastfeeding women. Titled "Breastfeeding photos embarrass Chinese-American to death", the article cited anonymous resources, labeled breastfeeding photos as "R-rated-photos", and described those photos as "disturbing" and "disgusting." The article received strong reaction among Chinese American Community and the Taiwanese Breastfeeding Association launched a protest against World Journal. Media Watch criticized that the report was "misleading" and "biased."

It was also reported that World Journal allegedly failed to accommodate employees' legal nursing needs. Taiwanese American journalist and author To-wen Tseng blogged about her experience of being forced to pump her breast milk in a bathroom stall, and was harassed by colleagues for attempting to wash pumping accessories in the office kitchen. In November 2013, Legal Aid Society-Employment Law Center submitted a lawyer's letter to World Journal, requesting a policy change and supervisor training regarding nursing employees' legal rights.

The World Journal disputed the employee's claims, but agreed to settle the case. On August 25, 2014, World Journal made a policy change as requested and paid for the damage.

== See also ==
- The China Press
