= Politics of Jiangsu =

Politics of Chinese province

The politics of Jiangsu Province in the People's Republic of China is structured in a dual party-government system like all other governing institutions in mainland China.

The Governor of Jiangsu is the highest-ranking official in the People's Government of Jiangsu. However, in the province's dual party-government governing system, the Governor has less power than the Jiangsu Chinese Communist Party Provincial Committee Secretary, colloquially termed the "Jiangsu CCP Party Chief".

== List of the CCP Jiangsu Committee secretaries ==
No.	Image	Name	Term start	Term end	Ref.
1		Ke Qingshi (1902–1965)	November 1952	August 1954	
2		Jiang Weiqing (1910–2000)	August 1954	1967	
Cultural Revolution Interregnum			1967	1970	
3		Xu Shiyou (1906–1985)	December 1970	January 1974	
4		Peng Chong (1915–2010)	January 1974	February 1977	
5		Xu Jiatun (1916–2016)	February 1977	April 1983	
6		Han Peixin (1921–2017)	April 1983	December 1989	
7		Shen Daren (1928–2017)	December 1989	September 1993	
8		Chen Huanyou (born 1934)	September 1993	December 1999	
9		Hui Liangyu (born 1944)	December 1999	December 2002	
10		Li Yuanchao (born 1950)	December 2002	October 2007	
11		Liang Baohua (born 1945)	October 2007	6 December 2010	
12		Luo Zhijun (born 1951)	6 December 2010	30 June 2016	
13		Li Qiang (born 1959)	30 June 2016	29 October 2017	
14		Lou Qinjian (born 1956)	29 October 2017	19 October 2021	
15		Wu Zhenglong (born 1964)	19 October 2021	28 December 2022	
16		Xin Changxing (born 1963)	3 January 2023	Incumbent	

== List of the governors of Jiangsu ==
1. Tan Zhenlin (谭震林): 1952–1955
2. Hui Yuyu (惠浴宇): 1955–1967
3. Xu Shiyou (许世友): 1968–1973
4. Peng Chong (彭冲): 1974–1977
5. Xu Jiatun (许家屯): 1977–1979
6. Hui Yuyu (惠浴宇): 1979–1982
7. Han Peixin (韩培信): 1982–1983
8. Gu Xiulian (顾秀莲): 1983–1989
9. Chen Huanyou (陈焕友): 1989–1994
10. Zheng Silin (郑斯林): 1994–1998
11. Ji Yunshi (季允石): 1998–2002
12. Liang Baohua: 2002 – January 2008
13. Luo Zhijun: January 2008 – December 2010
14. Li Xueyong: December 2010 – November 2015
15. Shi Taifeng: November 2015 – April 2017
16. Wu Zhenglong: April 2017 – October 2021
17. Xu Kunlin (许昆林): October 2021 – September 2025
18. Liu Xiaotao (许昆林): October 2025 – present

== List of the chairmen of Jiangsu People's Congress ==
1. Xu Jiatun (许家屯): 1979–1983
2. Chu Jiang (储江): 1983–1988
3. Han Peixin (韩培信): 1988–1993
4. Shen Daren (沈达人): 1993–1998
5. Chen Huanyou (陈焕友): 1998–2003
6. Li Yuanchao (李源潮): 2003–2007
7. Wang Shouting (王寿亭): 2007–2008 (acting)
8. Liang Baohua (梁保华): 2008–2011
9. Luo Zhijun (罗志军): 2011–2017
10. Wu Zhenglong (吴政隆): 2022–present

== List of the chairmen of CPPCC Jiangsu Committee ==
1. Jiang Weiqing (江渭清): 1955–1967
2. Xu Jiatun (许家屯): 1977–1979
3. Hui Yuyu (惠浴宇): 1979
4. Bao Houchang (包厚昌): 1979–1983
5. Qian Zhonghan (钱钟韩): 1983–1989
6. Sun Han (孙颔): 1989–1998
7. Cao Keming (曹克明): 1998–2003
8. Xu Zhonglin (许仲林): 2003–2007
9. Zhang Lianzhen (张连珍): 2007–2017
10. Jiang Dingzhi (蒋定之): 2017–2018
11. Huang Lixin (黄莉新): 2018–2022
12. Zhang Yizhen (张义珍): 2022–present
