= Jiangsu Provincial Committee of the Chinese Communist Party =

Jiangsu Provincial Committee of the Chinese Communist Party 中国共产党江苏省委员会

Overview
- Type: Highest decision-making organ when Jiangsu Provincial Congress is not in session.
- Elected by: Jiangsu Provincial Congress
- Length of term: Five years
- Term limits: None
- First convocation: June 1927
- Secretary: Xin Changxing
- Deputy Secretary: Liu Xiaotao (Governor); Fan Bo
- Secretary-General: Chu Zhongwei
- Executive organ: Standing Committee
- Inspection organ: Commission for Discipline Inspection

Jiangsu Provincial Committee of the Chinese Communist Party
- Simplified Chinese: 中国共产党江苏省委员会
- Traditional Chinese: 中國共產黨江蘇省委員會
Transcriptions
Standard Mandarin
- Hanyu Pinyin: Zhōngguó Gòngchǎndǎng Jiāngsūshěng Wěiyuánhuì

Abbreviation
- Simplified Chinese: 中共江苏省委
- Traditional Chinese: 中共江蘇省委
- Literal meaning: CCP Jiangsu Provincial Committee
Transcriptions
Standard Mandarin
- Hanyu Pinyin: Zhōnggòng Jiāngsūshěng Wěi

The Jiangsu Provincial Committee of the Chinese Communist Party is the provincial committee of the Chinese Communist Party (CCP) in Jiangsu. The CCP committee secretary is the highest ranking post in the province. The current secretary is Xin Changxing, who succeeded Wu Zhenglong on 3 January 2023.

== History ==
The CCP Central Committee resolved to form the CCP Jiangsu Provincial Committee (and Shanghai Municipal Committee) in Shanghai in early June 1927, appointing Chen Yannian as the secretary. On the morning of June 26, the Jiangsu Provincial Committee convened a meeting in Shanghai, attended by Chen Yannian, Zhao Shiyan, Wang Ruofei, Guo Bohe, Han Buxian, Zhang Weizhen, Kang Sheng, and Huang Jingshi, among others. During the meeting, it was declared that the provincial party committee established organizational, propaganda, and other ministries, while simultaneously announcing the allocation of responsibilities among the provincial party committee members. Consequently, the provincial party organs were dismantled in that afternoon, and the provincial party secretary, Chen Yannian, together with organization minister Guo Bohe, secretary-general Han Buxian, and Huang Jingshi, were apprehended. Zhao Shiyan subsequently served as the Secretary of the Provincial Party Committee.

On July 2, 1927, the CCP Jiangsu Provincial Committee's apparatus was once again compromised owing to treachery, resulting in the simultaneous arrest of Zhao Shiyan and over ten others. The CCP Central Committee resolved to reorganize the CCP Jiangsu Provincial Committee, which included Wang Ruofei and five additional members. In late July 1927, the Central Committee appointed Deng Zhongxia as the secretary of the Jiangsu Provincial Committee. Deng arrived in Shanghai from Hankou in mid-August and restructured the Jiangsu Provincial Committee in accordance with the Central Committee's directive. In mid-January 1928, the CCP Central Committee transferred Deng to serve as the secretary of the CCP Guangdong Provincial Committee, with Xiang Ying assuming the role of secretary for the Jiangsu Provincial Committee. On January 19, the Standing Committee of the Jiangsu Provincial Committee convened and resolved that Xiang Ying and five more members would constitute the Bureau of the Provincial Committee. On February 16, the treachery of the traitor Tang Ruilin resulted in the arrest and execution of over ten members of the Provincial Committee's Standing Committee, including Zheng Futa and member Xu Baihao, inflicting significant losses on the Provincial Committee once more. On February 27, the Standing Committee of the Central Committee resolved that the Standing Committee of the Jiangsu Provincial Committee would consist of five members: Xiang Ying, Wang Ruofei, Li Fuchun, Xu Binggen, and Huang Ping.

In May 1928, twelve representatives of the CCP Jiangsu Committee, including Xiang Ying, Wang Ruofei, Xu Xigen, Guo Chunzhi, Jiang Yonghe, Chen Zhiping, Zhu Songshou, Wen Yucheng, Jiang Yun, Wen Shaoquan, Cai Chang, and Yan Pu, departed from Shanghai for Moscow to attend the 6th National Congress of the Chinese Communist Party, while some leaders of the provincial party committee remained in Shanghai to oversee the committee's operations. Li Fuchun served as the secretary of the Jiangsu Provincial Party Committee, and in September and October, the Jiangsu delegates to the Sixth National Congress of the CCP returned to Shanghai from Moscow consecutively. In October 1928, the central government appointed Xu Xigen as the secretary of the Jiangsu Provincial Party Committee and Luo Dengxian as a member of the Standing Committee of the Jiangsu Provincial Party Committee. On January 25, 1929, a meeting of the Bureau of the Jiangsu Provincial Party Committee convened, during which Xiang Zhongfa, Chairman of the Standing Committee of the Politburo of the Central Committee, and Zhou Enlai, member of the Standing Committee of the Politburo of the Central Committee and Minister of the Organizational Department, communicated the Central Committee's decision to reorganize the Jiangsu Provincial Party Committee. The newly formed Provincial Party Committee comprised five members, including Secretary Luo Dengxian, as well as Li Fuchun and He Mengxiong, who were reassigned to the district committee in Shanghai, among others. In September, Li Weihan served as the secretary of the Provincial Party Committee.

From 11 to 26 November 1929, the Second Jiangsu Provincial Congress secretly held in Shanghai, and the Jiangsu Provincial Committee was restructured to the Jiangnan Provincial Committee in early October 1930. In January 1931, the Jiangsu Provincial Committee was reestablished. However, due to repeated arrests, the provincial committee was forced to cease activities in early January 1935.

In early November 1937, the Jiangsu Provincial Committee was reestablished in Shanghai with Liu Xiao as its secretary. In early 1938, the Provincial Committee established an Outer County Working Committee in Pudong to organize anti-Japanese forces. On 13 January 1943, the CCP Secretariat decided to abolish the provincial committee and establish an enemy area work department in the Central China Bureau in its place. After the proclamation of the People's Republic of China on 1 October 1949, the Jiangsu Province was divided into south Jiangsu and north Jiangsu administrative regions. After the administrative regions were abolished in 1952, Jiangsu Provincial Committee was reestablished in November 1952, becoming the highest political force of the province.

In January 1967, during the Cultural Revolution, the provincial committee was overthrown. In March 1967, the central government decided to establish military rule in the province, and a revolutionary committee was established in March 1968. In December 1970, the Jiangsu Provincial Committee was reestablished and reorganized to work along with the revolutionary committee. The two institutions began to separate in November 1974.

== Organization ==
The organization of the Jiangsu Provincial Committee includes:

- General Office

=== Functional Departments ===
- Organization Department
- Publicity Department
- United Front Work Department
- Political and Legal Affairs Commission

=== Offices ===
- Policy Research Office
- Office of the Cyberspace Affairs Commission
- Office of the Institutional Organization Commission
- Office of the Military-civilian Fusion Development Committee
- Taiwan Work Office
- Office of the Leading Group for Inspection Work
- Bureau of Veteran Cadres

=== Dispatched institutions ===
- Working Committee of the Organs Directly Affiliated to the Jiangsu Provincial Committee

=== Organizations directly under the Committee ===
- Jiangsu Party School
- Jiangsu Institute of Socialism
- Xinhua Daily
- Mass Magazine
- Jiangsu Party History Research Office
- Jiangsu Provincial Archives

== Leadership ==
=== Party Committees ===
3rd Provincial Committee (July 1956 - December 1960)

- First Secretary: Jiang Weiqing
- Secretariats of the Office of the Secretary: Jiang Weiqing, Liu Shunyuan, Hui Yuyu, Chen Guang, Xu Jiatun
- Standing Committee Members: Jiang Weiqing, Liu Shunyuan, Liu Xiansheng, Qiu Yihan, Chen Guang, Wei Yongyi, Zhou Yifeng, Xu Jiatun, Gao Feng, Gong Weizhen, Yu Minghuang, Ouyang Hualin, Hua Chengyi, Hui Yuyu

4th Provincial Committee (December 1960 - December 1970)

- First Secretary: Jiang Weiqing
- Deputy Secretaries: Peng Chong, Bao Houchang
- Secretariats of the Office of the Secretary: Liu Shunyuan, Hui Yuyu, Chen Guang, Li Shiyin, Xu Jiatun
- Standing Committee Members: Jiang Weiqing, Chen Guang, Liu Shunyuan, Hui Yuyu, Li Tuying, Xu Jiatun, Peng Chong, Bao Houchang, Gong Weizhen, Xin Shaobo, Chen Shutong, Ouyang Huilin, Zeng Ruqing, Zhou Yifeng

5th Provincial Committee (December 1970 - 1979)

- First Secretary: Xu Shiyou (December 1970 - November 1974), Peng Chong (November 1974 - )
- Secretaries: Du Ping, Wu Dasheng
- Deputy Secretaries: Peng Chong, Yang Guangli
- Standing Committee Members: Xu Shiyou, Xu Jiatun, Du Ping, Yang Guangli, Xiao Yongyin, Wu Dasheng, Chi Mingtang, Peng Chong and Jiang Ke

6th Provincial Committee (1979 - December 1984 )

- Secretary: Xu Jiatun

7th Provincial Committee (December 1984 – December 1989)

- Secretary: Han Peixin
- Deputy Secretaries: Shen Daren, Gu Xiulian, Sun Jiao, Chen Huanyou (March 1986 - December 1989), Sun Jiazheng (March 1986 - December 1989)
- Standing Committee Members: Han Peixin, Shen Daren, Gu Xiulian, Sun Jiao, Chen Huanyou, Sun Jiazheng, Ye Xutai, Yue Dewang, Cheng Weigao, Wu Xijun, Hu Fuming, Chen Huanyou (March 1986 - December 1989), Sun Jiazheng (March 1986 - December 1989)

8th Provincial Committee (December 1989 – December 1994)

- Secretary: Shen Daren
- Deputy Secretaries: Chen Huanyou, Deng Hongxun, Sun Jiazheng, Cao Hongming
- Standing Committee Members: Shen Daren, Chen Huanyou, Deng Hongxun, Sun Jiazheng, Cao Hongming, Yue Dewang, Hu Fuming, Gu Hao, Cao Keming, Gao Dezheng, Dai Shunzhi

9th Provincial Committee (December 1994 – November 2001)

- Secretary: Chen Huanyou
- Deputy Secretaries: Zheng Silin, Cao Keming, Gu Hao, Xu Zhonglin
- Standing Committee Members: Chen Huanyou, Zheng Silin, Cao Keming, Gu Hao, Xu Zhonglin, Zheng Bingqing, Ji Yunshi, Yu Xingde, Wang Xialin, Yang Xiaotang, Liang Baohua, and Li Mingchao

10th Provincial Committee (November 2001 – November 2006)

- Secretary: Hui Liangyu (12 November 2001 – December 2002) → Li Yuanchao (December 2002 – )
- Deputy Secretaries: Wang Shouting, Liang Baohua, Ren Yanshen, Xu Zhonglin (from October 2002)

11th Provincial Committee (November 2006 – November 2011)

- Secretary: Li Yuanchao (– October 2007) → Liang Baohua (October 2007 – December 2010) → Luo Zhijun (December 2010 – )
- Deputy Secretaries: Liang Baohua, Zhang Lianzhen
- Standing Committee Members: Li Yuanchao, Liang Baohua, Zhang Lianzhen, Feng Mingang, Wang Guosheng, Luo Zhijun, Zhao Kezhi, Wu Qi, Sun Zhijun, Wang Rong, Lin Xiangguo, Li Yunfeng, Yang Weize

12th Provincial Committee (November 2011 – November 2016)

- Secretary: Luo Zhijun (– June 2016), Li Qiang (June 2016 – )
- Deputy Secretaries: Li Xueyong (– December 2015), Shi Taifeng, Wu Zhenglong (from September 2016)
- Standing Committee Members:Luo Zhijun (– June 2016), Li Xueyong (– December 2015), Shi Taifeng, Hong Qiang (female) (– October 2016), Li Yunfeng (– May 2016, investigated for serious violations), Yang Weize (– January 2015, investigated for serious violations), Yang Xinli (– July 2014), Huang Lixin (female), Li Duxin (– January 2015), Jiang Hongkun (– June 2014), Li Xiaomin, Fan Jinlong, Wang Yanwen (female), Xu Ming (June 2014 – July 2016), Wang Jiong (from August 2014), Cao Dexin (from January 2015), Wang Like (Manchu) (from November 2015), Li Qiang (from June 2016), Yang Yue (from June 2016), Wu Zhenglong (from September 2016), Jiang Zhuoqing (from October 2016)

13th Provincial Party Committee (November 2016 – November 2021)

- Secretary: Li Qiang (until 29 October 2017), Lou Qinjian (29 October 2017 – 19 October 2021), Wu Zhenglong (until 19 October 2021)
- Deputy Secretaries: Shi Taifeng (until April 2017), Wu Zhenglong (until October 2021), Huang Lixin (July 2017 – March 2018), Ren Zhenhe (July 2019 – December 2020), Zhang Jinghua (February 2021 – November 2021), Xu Kunlin (from October 2021), Zhang Yizhen (from November 2021)
- Other Standing Committee members: Huang Lixin (until March 2018), Yang Yue, Li Xiaomin (until July 2019), Wang Jiong (until May 2017), Fan Jinlong, Wang Yanwen (until June 2020), Jiang Zhuoqing (until December 2019), Wang Like (until October 2020), Zhou Naixiang (until September 2019), Guo Wenqi (May 2017 – December 2020), Zhang Jinghua (July 2017 – November 2021), Meng Zhongkang (January 2018 – September 2019, put under investigation), Lan Shaomin (September 2019 – September 2020), Guo Yuanqiang (October 2019 – September 2021), Zhang Lihong (from February 2020), Wang Changsong (from March 2020), Xu Kunlin (from September 2020), Zhang Aijun (from October 2020), Fei Gaoyun (from January 2021), Han Liming (from April 2021), Zhao Shiyong (from April 2021), Zhang Yizhen (from November 2021), Deng Xiuming (from November 2021)

14th Provincial Party Committee (November 2021–)

- Secretary: Wu Zhenglong (until 28 December 2022), Xin Changxing (from 3 January 2023)
- Deputy Secretaries: Xu Kunlin, Zhang Yizhen (until January 2022), Deng Xiuming (July 2022 – July 2023), Shen Ying (from November 2023)
- Other Standing Committee members: Wang Changsong (until July 2023), Deng Xiuming (until July 2023), Zhang Aijun (until April 2024), Fei Gaoyun (until December 2022), Han Liming, Zhao Shiyong (until October 2022), Hui Jianlin, Pan Xianzhang (until August 2022), Cao Lubao (until October 2023), Chu Yonghong (from September 2022), Shen Ying (from December 2022), Liu Jianyang (from December 2022), Ma Xin (from January 2023), Zhang Guocheng (from April 2023), Zhang Zhong (from July 2023), Liu Xiaotao (from October 2023), Hu Guangjie (from April 2024), Xu Ying (from May 2024), Li Yaoguang (from November 2024), Zhou Hongbo (from December 2024)
