= Governor of Jiangsu =

Governor of the Jiangsu Provincial People's Government
- 江苏省人民政府省长
- National Emblem of China

- Flag of China

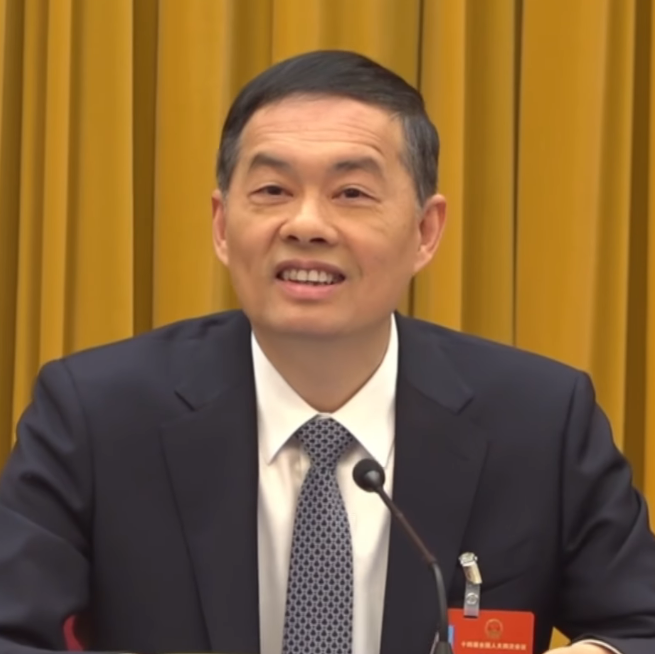
- Incumbent; Liu Xiaotao since 9 October 2025
- Jiangsu Provincial People's Government
- Type: Governor
- Status: Provincial and ministerial-level official
- Reports to: Jiangsu Provincial People's Congress and its Standing Committee
- Nominator: Presidium of the Jiangsu Provincial People's Congress
- Appointer: Jiangsu Provincial People's Congress
- Term length: Five years, renewable
- Inaugural holder: Tan Zhenlin
- Formation: August 1949
- Deputy: Deputy Governors; Secretary-General

The governor of Jiangsu, officially the Governor of the Jiangsu Provincial People's Government, is the head of Jiangsu Province and leader of the Jiangsu Provincial People's Government.

The governor is elected by the Jiangsu Provincial People's Congress, and responsible to it and its Standing Committee. The governor is a provincial level official and is responsible for the overall decision-making of the provincial government. The governor is assisted by an executive vice governor as well as several vice governors. The governor generally serves as the deputy secretary of the Jiangsu Provincial Committee of the Chinese Communist Party and as a member of the CCP Central Committee. The governor is the second highest-ranking official in the province after the secretary of the CCP Jiangsu Committee. The current governor is Xu Kunlin, who took office on 19 October 2021.

== List of governors ==
=== Republic of China ===
==== Beiyang government ====
No.	Officeholder	Term of office	
No.	Officeholder	Took office	Left office
Military Governor
1	Cheng Dequan (1860–1930)	5 November 1911	1 January 1912
2	Zhuang Yunkuan (1867–1932)	1 January 1912	13 April 1912
3	Cheng Dequan (1860–1930)	13 April 1912	3 September 1913
4	Zhang Xun (1854–1923)	3 September 1913	16 December 1913
5	Feng Guozhang (1859–1919)	16 December 1913	1 August 1917
6	Li Chun (1867–1920)	6 August 1917	12 October 1920
7	Qi Xieyuan (1885–1946)	15 October 1920	11 December 1924
8	Han Guojun (1857–1942)	11 December 1924	6 January 1925
9	Lu Yongxiang (1867–1933)	16 January 1925	August 1925
10	Zheng Qian (1876–1929)	August 1925	29 August 1925
11	Yang Yuting (1886–1929)	29 August 1925	25 November 1925
12	Sun Chuanfang (1885–1935)	25 November 1925	24 March 1927
Civilian Governor
1	Ying Dehong (1876–1919)	19 November 1912	6 September 1913
2	Han Guojun (1857–1942)	9 September 1913	15 July 1914
3	Qi Yaolin (1862–1949)	15 July 1914	18 September 1920
4	Wang Hu (1865–1933)	18 September 1920	15 June 1922
5	Han Guojun (1857–1942)	15 June 1922	14 February 1925
6	Zheng Qian (1876–1929)	14 February 1925	1 December 1925
7	Chen Taoyi (1881–1946)	1 December 1925	24 December 1926
8	Xu Dingkang (1876–1938)	24 December 1926	24 March 1927

==== Nationalist government ====
No.	Officeholder	Term of office	
No.	Officeholder	Took office	Left office
Chairman of the Jiangsu Provincial Government
1	Niu Yongjian (1870–1965)	1 November 1927	17 March 1930
2	Ye Chucang (1887–1946)	17 March 1930	15 December 1931
3	Gu Zhutong (1893–1987)	15 December 1931	3 October 1933
4	Chen Guofu (1892–1951)	3 October 1933	26 November 1937
5	Gu Zhutong (1893–1987)	26 November 1937	13 October 1939
6	Han Deqin (1892–1988)	12 May 1938	10 January 1945
7	Wang Maogong (1891–1961)	10 January 1945	2 September 1948
8	Ding Zhipan (1894–1988)	2 September 1948	21 May 1950

==== Japanese occupation ====
No.	Officeholder	Term of office	
No.	Officeholder	Took office	Left office
1	Chen Zemin (1881–1951)	30 March 1940	20 June 1940
2	Gao Guanwu (1892–1957)	20 June 1940	20 January 1943
3	Li Shiqun (1905–1943)	20 January 1943	9 September 1943
4	Chen Qun (1890–1945)	9 September 1943	2 November 1944
5	Ren Yuandao (1890–1980)	2 November 1944	3 May 1945
6	Xiang Zhizhuang (1894–1946)	3 May 1945	15 August 1945

=== People's Republic of China ===
No.	Officeholder	Term of office		Party	Ref.
No.	Officeholder	Took office	Left office	Party	Ref.
Governor of the Jiangsu Provincial People's Government
1	Tan Zhenlin (1902–1983)	August 1949	January 1955	Chinese Communist Party	
Governor of the Jiangsu Provincial People's Committee
2	Hui Yuyu (1909–1989)	August 1957	1964	Chinese Communist Party	
3	Du Ping (1908–1999)	1964	February 1968	Chinese Communist Party	
Director of the Jiangsu Revolutionary Committee
4	Xu Shiyou (1906–1985)	February 1968	1973	Chinese Communist Party	
5	Peng Chong (1915–2010)	1973	February 1977	Chinese Communist Party	
6	Xu Jiatun (1916–2016)	February 1977	December 1979	Chinese Communist Party	
Governor of the Jiangsu Provincial People's Government
7	Hui Yuyu (1909–1989)	January 1980	December 1981	Chinese Communist Party	
8	Han Peixin (1921–2017)	December 1981	May 1983	Chinese Communist Party	
9	Gu Xiulian (born 1936)	May 1983	April 1989	Chinese Communist Party	
10	Chen Huanyou (born 1934)	April 1989	September 1994	Chinese Communist Party	
11	Zheng Silin (1940–2022)	September 1994	September 1998	Chinese Communist Party	
12	Ji Yunshi (born 1945)	September 1998	December 2002	Chinese Communist Party	
13	Liang Baohua (born 1945)	December 2002	January 2008	Chinese Communist Party	
14	Luo Zhijun (1951–2023)	4 January 2008	8 December 2010	Chinese Communist Party	
15	Li Xueyong (born 1950)	8 December 2010	30 November 2015	Chinese Communist Party	
16	Shi Taifeng (born 1956)	28 January 2016 (acting from 30 November 2015)	31 May 2017	Chinese Communist Party	
17	Wu Zhenglong (born 1964)	31 May 2017	19 October 2021	Chinese Communist Party	
18	Xu Kunlin (born 1965)	19 October 2021	9 October 2025	Chinese Communist Party	
19	Liu Xiaotao (born 1970)	9 October 2025	Incumbent	Chinese Communist Party	
