= HTX Studio =

Chinese content creator

He Shijie
- Born: He Shijie (何世杰); Taiyuan, Shanxi, China
- Other names: He Tongxue (何同学); Richard
- Education: Beijing University of Posts and Telecommunications (BEng); Queen Mary University of London (BEng (Hons))
- Occupation: Video creator
- Known for: Technology review videos
- Awards: Bilibili Top 100 Uploaders (2019, 2020, 2021)

Bilibili information
- Channel: 老师好我叫何同学
- Years active: 2017–present
- Followers: 12.83 million

Instagram information
- Page: HTX Studio

X information
- Handle: @HTX_Studio

YouTube information
- Channels: HTX Studio; 老师好我叫何同学
- Genre: Technology
- Subscribers: 2.39 million; 265,000
- Views: 362.5 million; 17.9 million
- Last updated: 25 July 2026

He Shijie (Chinese: 何世杰; born April 1999), better known as Richard internationally or He Tongxue (Chinese: 何同学; lit. 'Classmate He'}) in China, is a Chinese content creator and technology reviewer, known for his English YouTube channel HTX Studio. He began publishing technology-focused videos on Bilibili in 2017 and gradually gained a following. He rose to prominence in 2019 after releasing a viral video reviewing 5G networks, which led to him winning Bilibili's "Uploader of the Year" award in 2020 and being named a "Top 100 Uploaders" in 2021. His YouTube channel gained over a million subscribers within a year.

== Career ==
While in his final year at Shanxi Experimental Secondary School, He produced a commemorative video for his class. The positive reception sparked his interest in video production, and he hoped to pursue a related field in university. However, as he had not taken the national arts school admission tests, he enrolled at Beijing University of Posts and Telecommunications (BUPT) and was assigned to the Telecommunications Engineering and Management program. After the college entrance exams, he opened his Bilibili account (老师好我叫何同学; Lǎoshī hǎo wǒ jiào Hé Tóngxué; 'Hello Sir/Ma'am (teacher)', 'My Name is Classmate He'), initially to learn filming and editing, but later began uploading his own tech product review videos.

In February 2018, He created a video about his experience with a full suite of Apple products, which garnered over 100,000 views in a short period. From then on, video production became his main focus outside of his studies. In February 2019, his review of AirPods was shared and endorsed by technology KOLs such as Zhu Haizhou, Product Manager for OnePlus' Mobile Software, which helped him build a following in Bilibili's digital technology community.

On June 6, 2019, He produced a video testing the 5G network on the BUPT campus. The same day, China's Ministry of Industry and Information Technology issued the first 5G commercial licenses. The video quickly gained widespread attention, receiving over 5 million views overnight. Official media outlets such as People's Daily, CCTV News, Xinhua News Agency, and the Communist Youth League of China reported on it. The outlet Guancha also praised the video.

Following this, He's popularity soared. Within a year, he participated in the recording of CCTV's Voice, and had opportunities to speak with Microsoft's CPO Panos Panay and Xiaomi CEO Lei Jun. In January 2020, at the "BILIBILI POWER UP 2019" awards ceremony, He was named one of the "Top 100 Uploaders of 2019", and his 5G review video won the "Best Work of the Year" award.

In February 2021, He released a video interviewing Apple Inc. CEO Tim Cook. China's diplomat Wang Wenbin shared the video on Facebook, praising the spirit of "helping each other in a time of need" in the video.

In July 2021, He completed his undergraduate studies. He had earlier established his own studio, "Hangzhou He Tongxue Cultural Media Co., Ltd." (Chinese: 杭州何同学文化传媒有限公司, now Hangzhou Jihe Digital Cultural Creative Co., Ltd., Chinese: 杭州几盒数字文化创意有限公司) and registered several trademarks, becoming a full-time video creator. In 2022, He moved his studio from Beijing to Shanghai.

In August 2025, some media outlets reported that his YouTube channel HTX Studio had become popular, with estimated annual earnings ranging from US$144,000 to $2.34 million. He personally refuted these claims, stating that the reports were severely inaccurate, and that his actual income from the channel was far below the lowest figure mentioned.

== Controversies ==
While his 2019 video "How Fast Is 5G?" brought him widespread fame, his work has often been criticized as more for show than for substance. A 2022 video about a custom keyboard also sparked controversy due to coding errors.

=== Failure to credit open-source code ===
In November 2024, He was embroiled in a controversy over the alleged misappropriation of open-source code in his video "I Made an Animation with 360,000 Lines Text in Notes." In the video, released on November 15, He claimed his team had "specifically written a software" to optimize the animation generation process. However, programmer and content creator "epcdiy" pointed out that the code used was adapted from an open-source project on GitHub called "ASCII-generator", which is licensed under the MIT License. The team had also removed the original author's attribution information, leading to accusations of plagiarism.

On November 19, He responded that the code was indeed based on the open-source project and had been modified to "optimize character generation ratios, image cropping methods, and parameter passing." He attributed the failure to credit the source to "miscommunication and scriptwriting errors". The video was updated to say, "we modified this open-source software." While some viewers expressed their willingness to believe him, others accused him of intellectual theft and deceiving his audience. On November 20, the original author responded, stating that subscribers "paid for He Tongxue's creativity," not for "something stolen from the internet", adding bluntly that the audience "deserves something better."

A commentary in Jimu News argued that He's script had concealed the software's open-source origins and his explanation seemed evasive. The critic claimed that this act of substitution undermined the spirit of online sharing and collaboration, and could negatively impact the ecosystem of the industry. Shen Zhao of the Yangtse Evening Post noted that He's video was a sponsored commercial project, and removing the original author's credit not only infringed on the author's rights but also lowered his audience's expectations for original content.

=== Remarks on rating ride-hailing drivers ===
On April 11, 2025, He sparked controversy on Weibo with a new stance on rating ride-hailing drivers. He stated that unless the service was exceptionally good, he would directly refuse drivers' requests for a "positive rating", claiming the practice was a way to cultivate "sincerity and courage" and overcome his "tendency to please others".

The statement quickly drew backlash on Chinese social media, with critics labeling him "arrogant" and "lacking empathy", arguing that he was ignoring the drivers' reliance on positive reviews. Related topics trended on Weibo, and his Bilibili account reportedly lost tens of thousands of followers. He later deleted the post and had not made any further public comment.

Media outlets, including The Beijing News, commented that while He was exercising his consumer rights, the way he publicly articulated his reasoning could be perceived as an elite perspective that was inconsiderate toward service industry workers.
