= Liu Jianyang =

Chinese politician

- 刘建洋

Head of the Organization Department of Jiangsu Provincial Committee of the Chinese Communist Party
- In office March 2024 – August 2026
- Preceded by: Shen Ying
- Succeeded by: Hu Lijie

Personal details
- Born: April 1966 (age 60) Lianhua County, Jiangxi, China
- Party: Chinese Communist Party

Liu Jianyang (刘建洋, born in April 1966), a native of Lianhua County, Jiangxi Province, is a Chinese politician. He was served as a member of the Standing Committee of the Jiangsu Provincial Committee of the Chinese Communist Party, the head of the Organization Department, and President of the Jiangsu Party School.

== Biography ==
Liu Jianyang began working in July 1985 and joined the Chinese Communist Party in December 1986. Liu began his studies in highway and bridge engineering at Jiangxi Transportation School in 1981. After graduation in 1985, he joined the Nanchang Municipal Engineering Administration, where he held various positions, including technician, deputy team leader, deputy director, section chief, and assistant to the director. In 1991, he was promoted to deputy director of the administration at division rank while concurrently studying water supply and drainage, and later construction management, at Tongji University.

=== Jiangxi ===
In December 1996, he was appointed deputy director of the Nanchang Urban and Rural Planning Bureau and promoted to director in 2001. Subsequently, he served as deputy secretary-general of the Nanchang Municipal Government, director and party secretary of the Municipal Construction Commission, and concurrently vice chairman of the Nanchang Urban Construction Investment Development. He also served as Party Secretary of the Urban Management Bureau and Political Commissar of the Urban Management Detachment.

In December 2006, Liu became vice mayor of Nanchang. In April 2010, he was appointed to the Standing Committee of the CCP Nanchang Municipal Committee, later continuing as vice mayor.

In September 2016, he was transferred to the Ganjiang New Area, serving as Deputy Secretary of the Party Working Committee and Vice Mayor of Nanchang. The following month, he became Director of the Management Committee of Ganjiang New Area. In April 2018, he was named acting mayor of Nanchang and concurrently held leadership roles in Ganjiang New Area. He officially became mayor of Nanchang in May 2018.

=== Fujian ===
In December 2019, Liu was appointed Party Secretary of Putian, Fujian Province. In November 2021, he became a member of the Standing Committee of the Fujian Provincial Committee of the Chinese Communist Party while continuing as Party Secretary of Putian. In December 2021, he was appointed Party Secretary of Quanzhou and First Secretary of the Party Committee of the Quanzhou Military Subdistrict.

=== Jiangsu ===
In December 2022, he was transferred to Jiangsu Province as a member of the Standing Committee of the Jiangsu Provincial Committee of the Chinese Communist Party and Secretary of the Political and Legal Affairs Commission. In March 2024, he concurrently assumed the role of Head of the Organization Department. As of November 2024, he serves exclusively as Head of the Organization Department.

== Investigation ==
On 31 August 2026, Liu was suspected of "serious violations of laws and regulations" by the Central Commission for Discipline Inspection (CCDI), the party's internal disciplinary body, and the National Supervisory Commission, the highest anti-corruption agency of China.

Party political offices
Preceded by Shen Ying	Head of the Organization Department of the CCP Jiangsu Provincial Committee; March 2024－August 2026	Succeeded by Hu Lijie
Preceded by Deng Xiuming	Secretary of the Jiangsu Political and Legal Affairs Commission; December 2022－November 2024	Succeeded by Li Yaoguang
Preceded by Wang Yongli	Party Secretary of Quanzhou; December 2021－ December 2022	Succeeded by Zhang Yigong
Preceded by Lin Baojin	Party Secretary of Putian; December 2019－ December 2021	Succeeded by Fu Zhaoyang
Government offices
Preceded by Guo An	Mayor of Nanchang; April 2018－December 2019	Succeeded by Huang Xizhong
