= Yangtse Evening Post =

Simplified Chinese newspaper

- Native name: 扬子晚报
- Type: Daily newspaper
- Format: Print, online
- Owner: Jiangsu Provincial Committee of the Chinese Communist Party
- Founded: January 1, 1986
- Political alignment: Chinese Communist Party
- Language: Chinese
- Headquarters: Nanjing
- OCLC number: 123264670
- Website: www.yangtse.com

The Yangtse Evening Post or Yangtze Evening Post (simplified Chinese: 扬子晚报; traditional Chinese: 揚子晚報; pinyin: Yángzǐ wǎnbào), also known as Yangtse Evening News or Yangtze Evening News, is a Nanjing-based Chinese language state newspaper published in China. It is one of world's most circulated newspapers. The paper is affiliated with the Xinhua News Agency.

== History ==
On January 1, 1986, Yangtse Evening Post was launched in Nanjing. It is an evening newspaper established by Xinhua Daily, an official newspaper of the Jiangsu Provincial Committee of the Chinese Communist Party.
