= Jiangsu Party School =

Chinese Communist Party institute

Party School of the CCP Jiangsu Provincial Committee (Jiangsu Administration Institute)
- 中共江苏省委党校（江苏行政学院）
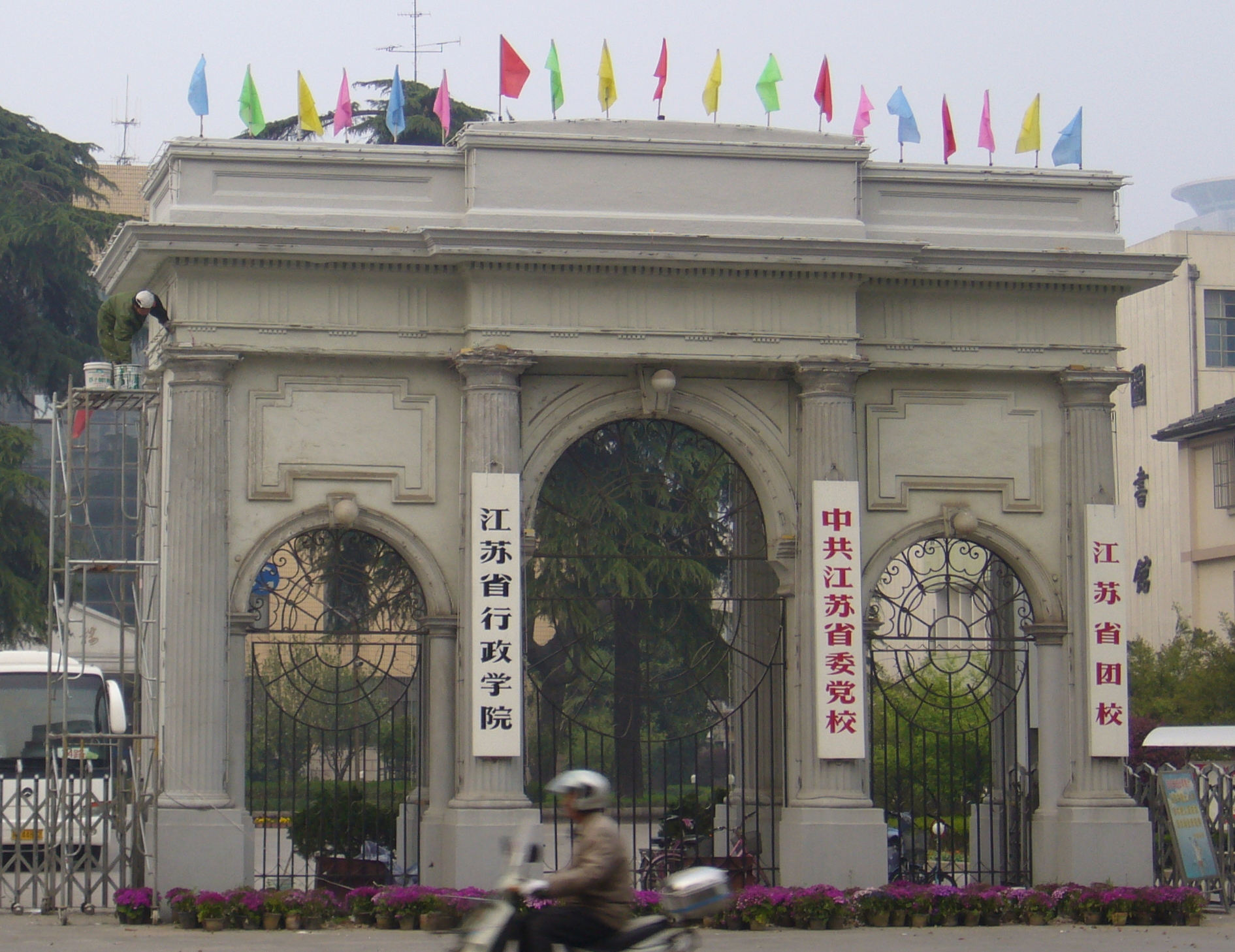
- Former names: Jiangsu Provincial Party School; Jiangsu Administration Institute
- Type: Public, government-affiliated training institution
- Established: January 1953
- Parent institution: CCP Jiangsu Provincial Committee and People's Government of Jiangsu Province
- Vice-president: Yang Ming (Executive Vice President)
- Academic staff: 179 (teaching and research staff)
- Location: 49 Shuizuogang, Gulou District, Nanjing, Nanjing, Jiangsu, China
- Campus: Urban

The Party School of the CCP Jiangsu Provincial Committee (Chinese: 中共江苏省委党校), or Jiangsu Party School (Chinese: 江苏党校), also known as the Jiangsu Administration Institute (Chinese: 江苏行政学院), is a public institution under the direct administration of the CCP Jiangsu Provincial Committee and the People's Government of Jiangsu Province. It was established in January 1953 after the merger of the three schools: the Party School of the Southern Jiangsu Regional Committee, Party School of the Northern Jiangsu Regional Committee (Chinese: 苏北区委党校), and Nanjing Cadre School (Chinese: 南京市干部学校). In the midst of the Cultural Revolution the school was shut down but it reopened in 1977 after the third plenary session of the 11th Central Committee of the Chinese Communist Party. It teaches civil servants.
