= Censorship in the Republic of China (1912–1949) =

The Republic of China replaced the Qing dynasty following the 1911 Revolution, marking the end of imperial rule in China. However, the country soon fell under the control of the Beiyang warlords, who established the Beiyang government. This government did not often impose pre-publication regulations on the media but employed post-publication measures such as fines and shutdowns. After the Nationalist government gained control during the Northern Expedition in 1928, it began censoring cultural products to counteract communist ideology.

Censorship and freedom of speech became critical issues during peace talks between the Kuomintang (KMT) and the Chinese Communist Party (CCP) amid the Chinese Civil War. These discussions culminated in the constitution of the Republic of China in 1946, which guaranteed freedom of speech. However, this freedom was soon curtailed by the mobilization act aimed at suppressing the CCP in 1948.

== Background ==
In 1646, drawing from the Great Ming Code and incorporating elements of former Jin and Manchu legal traditions, the Qing dynasty promulgated the Great Qing Legal Code, which included the "Clause on Heretical Texts and Seditious Speech." This clause provided a broad and ambiguous framework that allowed the Qing court to suppress texts or speech deemed offensive or taboo. Under this vague provision, any writings or statements perceived as violating imperial sensitivities could be regulated and punished according to established traditional practices.

The Qing emperors banned the characters for expressing ethnic slurs against the Manchus and other non-Han ethnic groups.

In late imperial China, newspapers catered primarily to literate elites deeply influenced by Confucian culture, which emphasised tradition, rejected foreign ideas, and undervalued economics. These cultural elites dominated Chinese discourses about censorship, and they heavily disfavored entertainment culture such as theatrical performance and traditional storytelling. Academic Zhang Tianxing writes that these elites saw no contradiction between promoting culture they deemed more enlightened and censoring culture which they deemed unreformed.

Around 1890, public understanding of newspapers remained limited. By 1894, although Shen Bao had gained widespread readership, late Qing literati still did not show genuine respect for the press. It was only after Wang Kangnian and Liang Qichao co-founded Shiwu Bao (The Chinese Progress) in 1896, receiving praise from prominent figures like Zhang Zhidong, that newspapers began to attract the attention of intellectuals.

Between the founding of Shiwu Bao in 1896 and the Wuxu Coup in September 1898, over 70 newspapers were established across China, marking the first major boom in modern Chinese journalism. Initially, the Qing government responded by banning publications. On August 9, 1898, Kang Youwei petitioned the Guangxu Emperor to legislate newspaper regulations based on foreign legal systems. During the Hundred Days' Reform, the emperor issued more than 180 edicts, recognising the legitimacy of both private and official newspapers and permitting public petitions through the press. This briefly allowed some degree of press freedom, but these reforms were repealed after the reform movement failed.

Censorship of theatrical performances became increasingly systematic after 1900, as that form of censorship was enforced by newly-developing professionalized police forces in urban areas.

After the Qing government announced its plan for constitutional reform, between 1906 and 1911 it enacted five specific laws regulating newspaper publishing. The 1908 constitution formally institutionalised press control. On 14 March 1908, the government promulgated strict press regulations modelled on contemporary laws in Japan, Germany, and British Hong Kong in the Great Qing Press Law. The law imposed stringent controls, including prohibiting newspapers from reporting on ongoing legal cases before verdicts were announced or from covering trials closed to the public.

== Provisional government (1912) ==
On 12 February 1912, Emperor Puyi announced his abdication, marking the end of the Qing Dynasty. On 2 March, Sun Yat-sen's Provisional Government in Nanjing declared the abolition of the Great Qing Press Law. Two days later, the Ministry of the Interior issued the Provisional Press Law of the Republic of China, consisting of three articles. However, this sparked a public outcry, drawing criticism from major newspapers. On 6 March, a number of national dailies jointly telegraphed Sun Yat-sen, stating:

While laws against murder and robbery remain undecided, a press law is passed first. This seems to replicate the autocratic tactics of the Qing to suppress public opinion. The press as a whole finds it unacceptable.

On 9 March, Sun Yat-sen responded by ordering the Ministry of the Interior to revoke the Provisional Press Law, reasoning that it had not been approved by the Provisional Senate and thus lacked legal validity. On 10 March, Yuan Shikai declared himself Provisional President in Beijing. The following day, 11 March, before stepping down as Provisional President, Sun Yat-sen promulgated the Provisional Constitution of the Republic of China. This constitution guaranteed citizens' freedoms, including personal liberty, residence, property, speech, publication, assembly, association, correspondence, and religion. However, Article 15 allowed for the restriction of these freedoms "if deemed necessary to promote public welfare, maintain public order, or address urgent circumstances in accordance with the law." This provision drew immediate criticism, notably from Zhang Shizhao, who argued that terms such as "promote public welfare," "maintain public order," and "urgent necessity" were overly vague and elastic, rendering them susceptible to abuse and undermining the principle of free speech. Zhang further pointed out that Article 15 conflicted with Article 6 of the constitution, which explicitly guaranteed citizens' rights, highlighting inconsistencies in the legal framework.

== Beiyang government (1912–1928) ==
=== Yuan Shikai (1912–1916) ===
In the absence of strict regulation, the newspaper industry in China experienced explosive growth, with over 500 newspapers in circulation nationwide, setting a historical record. Freedom of the press was largely respected during this period, allowing newspapers to openly criticise officials, mock the president, and express dissenting opinions. Before the first parliamentary elections, four major political parties emerged: the KMT, the Republican Party, the Democratic Party, and the Unification Party. Recognising the influence of newspapers as key platforms for public opinion, each party launched its own official publications to propagate its views.

In 1912, the government banned the newspaper Ta Kung Pao after it criticised Yuan Shikai. Its editor Ying Lianzhi responded by distributing the paper free of charge.

However, after the assassination of Song Jiaoren in 1913, Yuan Shikai ordered the Ministry of the Interior to crack down on these newspapers under The Great Qing Press Law and Article 31 of Chapter 16 of the Criminal Code. Publications such as Guoguang News and Guofeng Daily criticised the government with terms like "government-sanctioned murder," "treason," and "despotic tyrant." These criticisms led to swift military and police actions, including the surrounding of newspaper offices, arrests of staff, and judicial summons.

In April 1914, Yuan Shikai's administration promulgated the Newspaper Ordinance, based on The Great Qing Press Law and Japan's Newspaper Law. This ordinance prohibited the publication of content in eight categories, including content deemed to "confuse political systems" or "endanger public order." In December of the same year, the Beiyang Government issued the Publishing Law, which extended these restrictions to all forms of printed material, including books and illustrations. It required all publications to be submitted to the police for review before distribution.

Following the failure of the Second Revolution, Yuan Shikai launched a sweeping suppression of KMT-affiliated and other anti-Yuan newspapers. Publications critical of Yuan were labelled "enemy newspapers" and shut down. Many editors and writers were wrongfully imprisoned or even killed. From the 1913 to Yuan's crackdown on the press during his attempt to restore the monarchy in 1916, the number of newspapers nationwide plummeted to around 130. This marked a four-year period of stagnation and decline for the Chinese press industry.

=== Warlord era (1915–1928) ===
During the Warlord Era, warlords interacted with journalists in diverse ways, reflecting their attitudes toward the press and their methods of control.

- Some warlords avoided contact with journalists altogether and imposed strict media regulations. This was typical of the first-generation warlords, who had transitioned from late Qing officials to Republic-era military leaders, retaining the conservative and hierarchical practices of the imperial bureaucracy.
- Other warlords, such as Yan Xishan, maintained limited engagement with journalists but exercised stringent oversight. Yan emphasised pre-publication censorship, to the extent that local reporters in Shanxi claimed they had never directly interviewed him. Zhang Zongchang of the Fengtian clique used even harsher methods, suppressing all dissenting voices in the Shandong press under his rule. Newspapers that failed to praise him were shut down or banned, and journalists whose reporting displeased him faced severe consequences, including threats to their lives.
- Some warlords were more structured in their interactions with journalists while maintaining strict narrative control. For example, Wu Peifu established a press office in Hankou in 1925 to disseminate his political views and military updates. This approach ensured a centralised and regulated flow of information to the media, offering access to reporters under carefully controlled conditions.
- In contrast, a few warlords cultivated more open relationships with the press. Zhang Xueliang exemplified this approach, treating journalists with respect and warmth. He even invited prominent reporters to the Northeast to showcase his governance and military achievements, using the media to bolster his reputation while exercising relatively light control over their activities.

Warlords also leveraged the media as a tool for propaganda and psychological warfare. Before launching military campaigns, they often flooded the press with statements condemning their rivals on moral and political grounds while issuing military threats. Once victorious, the winning faction typically suppressed the opposing warlord's media outlets. For example, after the Zhili-Anhui War, the Zhili clique shut down Ta Kung Pao, which had been subsidised by Anhui faction leader Wang Zhihong. Similarly, after the Second Zhili-Fengtian War, the Fengtian clique seized Yi Shi Bao for its pro-Zhili stance and arrested its general manager, Liu Junqing.

Film censorship in China began in July 1923, with the establishment of the Film Censorship Committee of the Jiangsu Provincial Education Association in Jiangsu. The committee set out specific requirements for film censorship, such as that films must be submitted for review, and that films that failed to pass must be deleted and corrected, or else they would not be allowed to be screened. The committee was a non-government organization mostly composed of educators, and filmmakers did not comply with the requirements, which made its attempt at censorship ineffective.

In 1926, the Hangzhou Film Censorship Board became the first in China to cooperate work with the police to implement censorship. The Beijing government also established the Film Censorship Committee in the same year. Censorship included issues of morality and crime, indecency, obstruction of diplomatic relations, and material deemed insulting to China. The relatively weak local control of the ROC government limited the practical effect of these efforts.

== Nationalist government (1928–1947) ==
After the KMT's breaking of the first United Front, the KMT sought to suppress the Communists both militarily and culturally. From 1928 to 1949, the Nationalist government increasingly censored cultural products in an effort to oppose communist ideology. These efforts increased during the Nanjing decade and included a national censorship apparatus established as part of the KMT's "Arts of the Three Principles of the People" cultural campaign. This program sought to censor cultural products deemed unwelcomed by the KMT, such as works by left-wing artists or writers.

In the late 1920s, the ROC banned the adaptation of martial arts novels into films. The Nationalist government contended that the masses were superstitious and would take the fantastical elements of these narratives as factual.

=== Nanjing decade (1928–1938) ===
From its inception, the Nanjing Nationalist Government declared that the "Three Principles of the People" were the only path to saving China, asserting that anyone opposing these principles was deemed counter-revolutionary. This stance was formalised in the Provisional Programme of National Reconstruction of the Republic of China, promulgated in October 1928. The programme stipulated that, when deemed necessary, the KMT had the authority to impose restrictions on freedoms of speech, publication, and other civil liberties "within the bounds of the law."

In February 1928, Chiang Kai-shek announced at the KMT Second Central Committee Fourth Plenary Session his intention to oppose Communist ideology and methods, pledging to eradicate communism. In late June 1930, the Ministry of Education under the Nationalist Government issued a directive criticising missionary schools for displaying religious books, newspapers, and illustrations on campus to promote religious teachings to students. The ministry deemed these practices a violation of regulations and called for their prohibition.

In December 1930, the KMT enacted the Publishing Law, introducing a registration system for all publications. It increased KMT control over newspapers, magazines, and books, and increased censorship of messages critical of the KMT. In November 1932, the KMT's Central Propaganda Department issued the Standards for Reviewing Propaganda Materials, which classified any promotion of communism as "reactionary propaganda," any criticism of the KMT as "harmful to the Republic of China," and any dissatisfaction with KMT rule as "reactionary." Such materials were categorically banned from publication.

In July 1930, the ROC government established the Film and Drama Censorship Committee in Nanjing. In 1931, the Executive Yuan passed the Film Censorship Law, and the Ministry of Education and the Ministry of the Interior of the Nanjing Government jointly established the Film Censorship Committee. In 1932, the "Outline of the Enforcement of the Film Censorship Law" banned depicting obscene and unchaste acts; depicting those who use tricks or violence against the opposite sex to satisfy their lust; depicting incest directly or indirectly; depicting women undressed and naked in an abnormal manner; depicting women giving birth or abortion.

In June 1934, the Nationalist Government issued the Regulations for Reviewing Books and Magazines, requiring all manuscripts of books and magazines to be submitted to the Central Propaganda Committee for review prior to printing. The review committee had the authority to modify or delete content, with prohibited sections removed without leaving blank spaces.

The 1934 release of the American film Welcome Danger was accused by Hong Shen of degrading the Chinese and he had a dispute with the cinema manager. The film was eventually banned by the government. In May 1934, the Film Censorship Council was reorganized into the Central Film Censorship Committee, (Note: 中央电影检查委员会) which became the official film censorship Institution.

The KMT sought to censor anti-Japanese messages through mechanisms including the 10 June 1935 Directive Urging Citizens to Foster Friendly Relations with Other Nations and the 20 February 1936 Emergency Measures for Maintaining Public Order which prohibited anti-Japanese movements and gave military police the power to arrest leftist activists and anti-Japanese activists.

On 15 July 1935, the Legislative Yuan revised the Publishing Law, mandating that newspapers submit registration applications to local authorities for approval before initial distribution.

On the night of 22 November 1936, the Shanghai Municipal Police, in coordination with the public and French concessions' police forces, arrested leaders of the National Salvation Association, including Shen Junru, Zhang Naiqi, Wang Zaoshi, Zou Taofen, Li Gongpu, Sha Ganli, and Shi Liang. On 25 November, the Nanjing Nationalist Government issued a proclamation accusing them of spreading rumours, advocating the overthrow of the Nationalist Government, and conspiring to incite a general strike in Shanghai. This move drew widespread criticism across the country. In response to mounting pressure, the Nanjing government released the detained leaders on 31 July 1937, along with over 700 other political prisoners. On 22 September 1937, the Central News Agency announced the KMT-CCP Cooperation Declaration. Following this declaration, the government adopted a more tolerant stance toward the speech of non-KMT individuals, marking a temporary easing of restrictions on political expression.

Under increasing pressure from Japan, authorities in the foreign concessions and elsewhere in China censored productions of the popular Sergei Tretyakov play, Roar, China!

=== Wartime censorship (1938–1945) ===
On 2 November 1938, the KMT Central Committee adopted the Resolution on Establishing Wartime News Policies, implementing nationwide wartime publishing controls. From 1 April 1939, all publications were subject to pre-publication manuscript review, with unapproved materials confiscated in accordance with the law.

The KMT banned Red Star over China and other works by Edgar Snow.

In the spring of 1939, the KMT established the Wartime News Censorship Bureau under the Military Commission, setting up five major news censorship offices in Chongqing, Chengdu, Xi’an, Guilin, and Kunming. Provincial news offices were elevated to news bureaus, with subordinate inspection offices established at local levels. County and municipal governments also set up specialised departments to oversee and censor newspapers and other publications.

In August 1943, the KMT Central Propaganda Department issued the List of Correct and Incorrect Terms for Use During the War of Resistance. Terms such as "border region government" and "anti-Japanese government" were banned, while phrases like "collaborator," "pro-Japanese faction," "unity," "liberation," "KMT-CCP cooperation," "people from all social strata," and "anti-Japanese national united front" were labelled as "erroneous terms." Mandated replacements included changing "revolutionary Three Principles of the People" to simply "Three Principles of the People" and "supporting revolutionary leaders" to "supporting the leader." Even the phrase "women's liberation" was replaced with "women's revival."

In 1941, during the Second Sino-Japanese War, the second volume of the book "Inside Asia", by John Gunther, was prohibited and censored by the Chinese government. Following the 1942–1943 American dollar bond scandal, Nationalist leader Chiang Kai-shek blocked newspapers from publishing the corruption allegations against finance minister H.H. Kung, also one of Chiang's relatives through marriage.

To protest censorship by the ROC government, Xinhua Daily marked articles censored by the government through techniques such as "opening a skylight" (leaving blank space where a censored article out have been) or explicit statements like "following deleted by order". In an effort to protect readers from being detected, Xinhua Daily generally printed only ads on the front cover.

In the 1940s, the ROC government sought to prevent the release of Hollywood films which it viewed as insulting to China or Chinese people.

During Japan's rule of Taiwan since the First Sino-Japanese War, Japanese colonial authorities had banned Chinese language use and newspapers written in Chinese. After the Japanese surrender, the ROC took control of Taiwan in 1946. There, the ROC banned Japanese books and, in 1947, banned newspapers written in Japanese.

== Communist rebellion (1945–1949) ==
Among the progressive periodicals censored by the Nationalist government was the digest Wencui Weekly. In May 1946, authorities seized copies of the magazine and prohibited Shanghai publishing houses from printing it. Wencui Weekly sought to evade censorship by using covers with different titles. On 21 July 1947, KMT agents arrested the manager of its covert printing factory and two of the workers, tortured them, and executed them later in 1947.

== See also ==
- Censorship in China
- Censorship in Taiwan
