= Hui Yuyu =

Chinese politician

Hui Yuyu (Chinese: 惠浴宇) (1909 – July 1989) was a People's Republic of China politician. He was the older brother of Zhou Hui, Chinese Communist Party Committee Secretary of Hunan and Inner Mongolia. He was born in Guannan County, Jiangsu Province. He was two-time governor and Chinese People's Political Consultative Conference Committee Chairman of his home province. He was a delegate to the 1st National People's Congress (1954–1959), 2nd National People's Congress (1959–1964) and 3rd National People's Congress (1964–1975). He was married to Gu Qing.

Preceded by Tan Zhenlin	Governor of Jiangsu; 1955–1967	Succeeded by Xu Shiyou
Preceded by Xu Jiatun	Governor of Jiangsu; 1979–1982	Succeeded by Han Peixin
Preceded by Xu Jiatun	CPPCC Committee Chairman of Jiangsu; 1979	Succeeded by Bao Houchang
