= Guo An =

Chinese politician

- 郭安

Communist Party Secretary of Yingtan
- In office March 2018 – February 2021
- Preceded by: Cao Shumin
- Succeeded by: Huang Xizhong

Mayor of Nanchang
- In office August 2013 – May 2018
- Preceded by: Chen Junqing
- Succeeded by: Liu Jianyang

Personal details
- Born: October 1962 (age 63–64) Xinfeng County, Jiangxi, China
- Party: Chinese Communist Party (expelled; 1985–2023)
- Education: Jiangxi Machinery School; Chinese Academy of Social Sciences; Central Party School of the Chinese Communist Party

Guo An (Chinese: 郭安; pinyin: Guō ān; born October 1962) is a former Chinese politician who spent his entire career in his home-province Jiangxi. As of September 2022 he was under investigation by China's top anti-corruption agency. He served as mayor of Nanchang from 2013 to 2018 and party secretary of Yingtan from 2018 to 2021.

He was a delegate to the 12th and 13th National People's Congress.

== Early life and education ==
Guo was born in Xinfeng County, Jiangxi, in October 1962. After resuming the college entrance examination, in 1979, he entered Jiangxi Machinery School, where he graduated in 1981. He also studied at the Chinese Academy of Social Sciences and the Central Party School of the Chinese Communist Party.

== Political career ==
Starting in 1981, he served in several posts in Yichun Planning Committee, including deputy chief of Secretary Section, deputy chief of Material Planning Section, and chief of Material Planning Section. He joined the Chinese Communist Party (CCP) in March 1985. In July 1995, he became vice mayor of Zhangshu, a county-level city under the jurisdiction of Yichun, rising to mayor in September 2000. He was appointed party secretary of Wanzai County in January 2002 and was admitted to member of the Standing Committee of the CCP Yichun Municipal Committee, the prefecture-level city's top authority. He was party secretary of Gao'an in March 2006, and held that office until July 2009.

In September 2007, he was admitted to member of the Standing Committee of the CCP Jingdezhen Municipal Committee, the prefecture-level city's top authority. Two months later, he was made executive vice mayor of the city.

He was deputy party secretary of Nanchang in September 2011, in addition to serving as secretary of the Political and Legal Affairs Commission. In August 2013, he was named acting mayor of Nanchang, confirmed in January 2014.

In March 2018, he became party secretary of Yingtan, his first foray into a prefectural leadership role.

He was chosen as chairperson of the Education, Science, Culture and Health Committee of Jiangxi Provincial People's Congress in January 2021, and held that office until September 2021.

== Investigation ==
On 16 September 2022, he has been placed under investigation for "serious violations of laws and regulations" by the Central Commission for Discipline Inspection (CCDI), the party's internal disciplinary body, and the National Supervisory Commission, the highest anti-corruption agency of China. On November 25, his qualification for delegates to the 13th National People's Congress was terminated.

On 1 February 2023, he was expelled from the CCP and removed from public office.

Government offices
Preceded by Chen Junqing	Mayor of Nanchang; 2013–2018	Succeeded by Liu Jianyang
Party political offices
Preceded by Cao Shumin	Communist Party Secretary of Yingtan; 2018–2021	Succeeded by Huang Xizhong
