= Xinhua News Agency Hong Kong Branch =

Xinhua News Agency Hong Kong Special Administrative Region Branch Limited
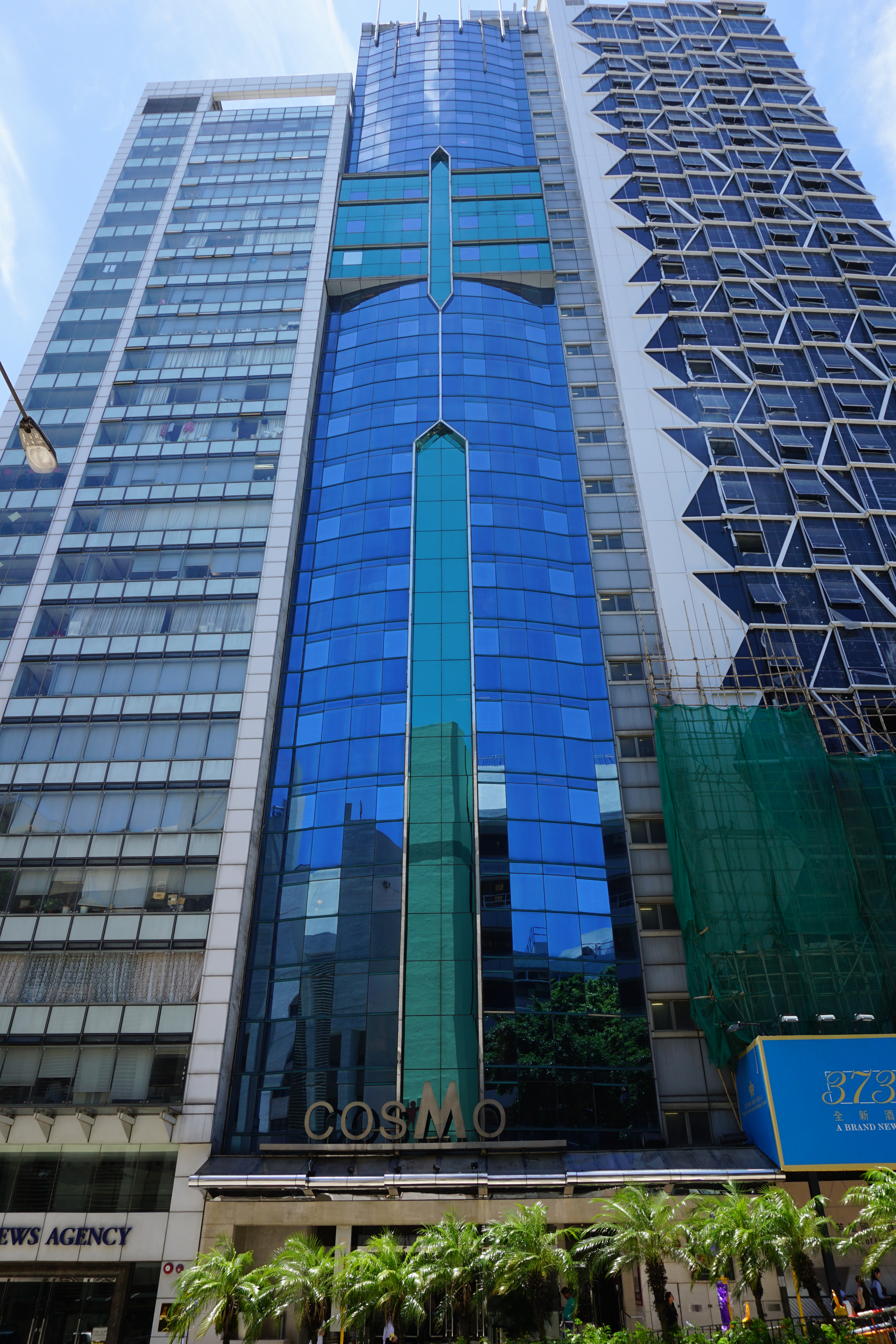
- Cosmo Hotel, where the headquarters of the Hong Kong Branch is located
- Native name: 新华通讯社香港特别行政区分社有限公司
- Type: State news agency
- Founded: January 17, 2000; 26 years ago
- Headquarters: 381 Queen's Road East, Wan Chai, Hong Kong
- Owner: Xinhua News Agency

Xinhua News Agency Hong Kong Branch
- Simplified Chinese: 新华社香港分社
- Traditional Chinese: 新華社香港分社
Transcriptions
Standard Mandarin
- Hanyu Pinyin: Xīnhuáshè Xiānggǎng Fēnshè

Xinhua News Agency Hong Kong Special Administrative Region Branch Limited
- Simplified Chinese: 新华通讯社香港特别行政区分社有限公司
- Traditional Chinese: 新華通訊社香港特別行政區分社有限公司
Transcriptions
Standard Mandarin
- Hanyu Pinyin: Xīnhuá Tōngxùnshè Xiānggǎng Tèbié Xíngzhèngqū Fēnshè Yǒuxiàn Gōngsī

Asia-Pacific Headquarters of the Xinhua News Agency
- Simplified Chinese: 新华通讯社亚太总分社
- Traditional Chinese: 新華通訊社亞太總分社
Transcriptions
Standard Mandarin
- Hanyu Pinyin: Xīnhuá Tōngxùnshè Yàtàizǒng Fēnshè

Xinhua News Agency Hong Kong Branch is the branch of Xinhua News Agency in Hong Kong. It serves as the Asia-Pacific headquarters of Xinhua News Agency.

During the British Hong Kong era, the Xinhua News Agency Hong Kong Branch, also known as "Big Xinhua", was a quasi-official representative office of the Central Committee of the Chinese Communist Party and the People's Republic of China (PRC) in the city. It acted as Beijing's de facto embassy through which the PRC conducted unofficial diplomatic contacts with the British government. The name of the agency was temporary because the two countries could not reach an agreement on the issue of Beijing's official representative office in Hong Kong. The "Editorial Office of the Hong Kong Branch of Xinhua News Agency" (Little Xinhua) acted as the news agency.

After the handover of Hong Kong, in 2000, "Big Xinhua" was renamed to the Hong Kong Liaison Office and "Little Xinhua" was renamed Xinhua News Agency Hong Kong Special Administrative Region Branch, and continued to engage in news business.

== History ==
=== British Hong Kong ===
Before the establishment of Hong Kong Branch, from early September to mid-October 1945, the Guangdong District Party Committee of the Chinese Communist Party sent Tan Tiandu as a representative of the CCP to hold talks with the representatives of the Governor of Hong Kong. British Hong Kong authorities accepted all the conditions proposed by the CCP, recognized the legal status of the CCP in Hong Kong, and agreed to the establishment of a semi-public working organization in Hong Kong. At the end of 1945, the CCP established the New South China News Agency in Hong Kong. The agency was originally supposed to be called the Xinhua News Agency South China Branch, but this name disapproved by the British. In June 1946, Rao Zhangfeng, a member of the Guangdong District Party Committee and a member of the Hong Kong-Guangdong Working Committee, was appointed as the president.

In late October 1946, Qiao Guanhua and Gong Peng arrived in Hong Kong. At that time, "Hong Kong had become the second line of Nanjing and Shanghai". According to the arrangement of the CCP Central Committee, Qiao's main task on this trip was to prepare for the establishment of the Hong Kong branch of Xinhua News Agency. In addition to carrying out united front work with Qiao, Gong Peng would also establish the first English weekly of the China Digest, which was widely distributed overseas in Hong Kong. In 1983, Qiao recalled to the Guangdong Party History Office: "The Central Committee asked me to go to Hong Kong and made it clear that my mission was to negotiate with the Hong Kong British authorities and publicly establish a branch of Xinhua News Agency in Hong Kong and to get their recognition.". Qiao said, "I was very familiar with the Hong Kong British authorities and had frequent dealings with them in the past. At the end of October 1946, after I arrived in Hong Kong, I handed over documents to the Hong Kong British authorities regarding the establishment of a branch of Xinhua News Agency in Hong Kong. Unexpectedly, the other party responded very quickly and agreed to set up a branch in Hong Kong. Xinhua News Agency's news materials could be collected in Hong Kong and printed out for subscription." According to him, "[i]t seems simple to obtain this power now, but it was not simple at the time. This was the first time in history that the Hong Kong British authorities had established relations with our party. No matter how this relationship is evaluated, I think it should be viewed this way."

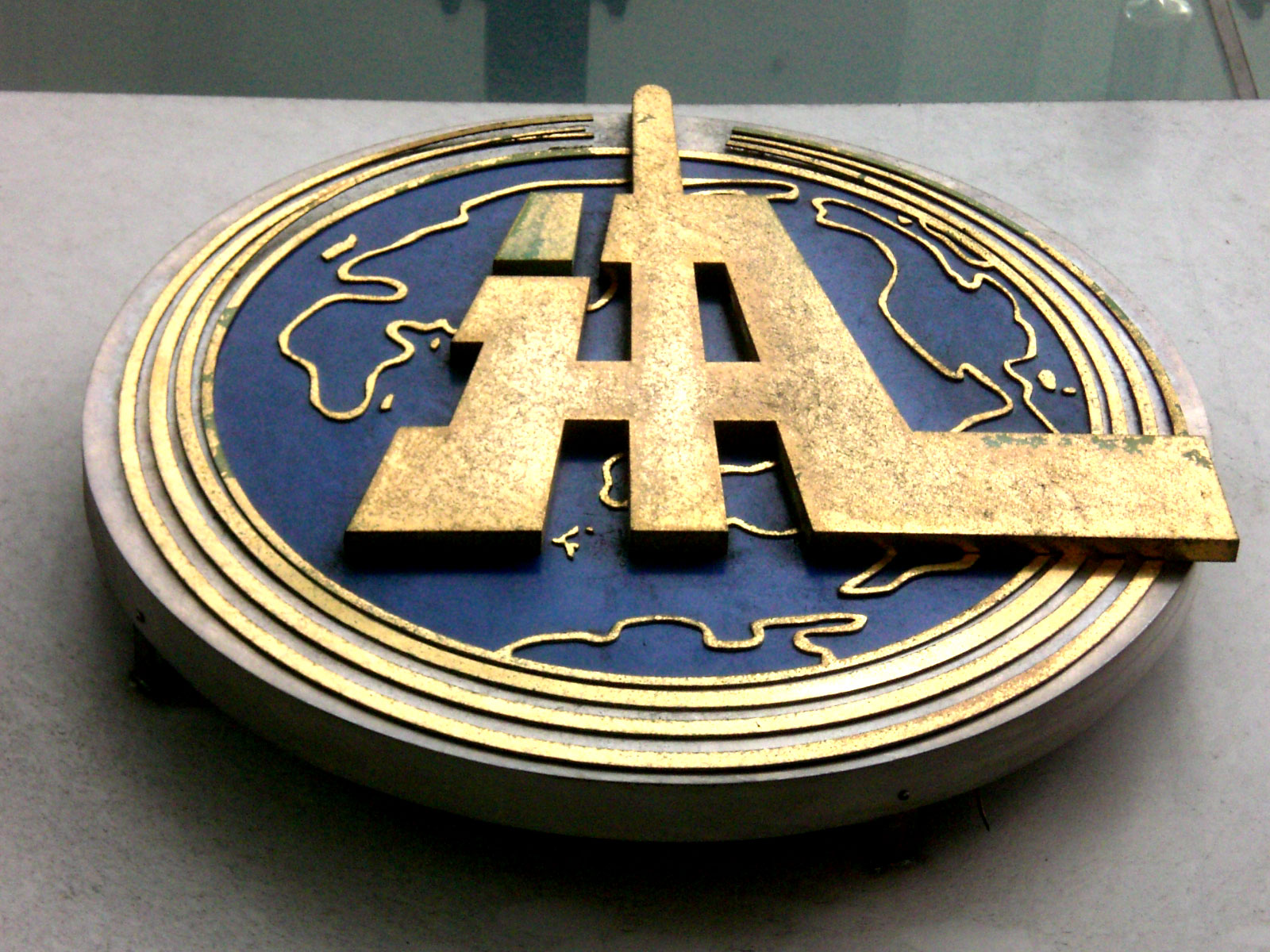
Wan Chai Xinhua News Agency

On May 1, 1947, the Hong Kong branch was officially established. Qiao was its first president. The original Dongjiang Column Hong Kong Office had two units on the third floor of 172 Nathan Road, Kowloon, which was used as offices. This was a small apartment building with a family bakery on the first floor. After the establishment of the branch, this became the office address. In the early days of its establishment, the Hong Kong branch was a semi-public agency and news agency of the CCP in Hong Kong. Its main task was to handle the exchanges and related affairs between the CCP's territories and the Hong Kong British authorities, and to establish channels for the CCP to communicate with overseas countries. It was the only external window for China at that time. The branch was composed of 15 people, including three editors of the Hong Kong Zhengbao of the South Bureau of the CCP (Li Chong later became the editor-in-chief and Tan Gan became the deputy editor-in-chief), five radio operators of the underground radio station of the South Bureau, and five staff members of the Dongjiang Column Hong Kong Office. They were responsible for distribution, transportation, logistics and other work. When Qiao arrived, Huang Zuomei (transferred to the Xinhua News Agency's London branch in 1947), Tan Gan, Xiao Xianfa and others were already in Hong Kong. Later, their superiors sent Yang Qi. The main work of the branch was to copy the telegrams from the headquarters, edit them into English and Chinese versions and send them to the media in Hong Kong and Southeast Asian media. The branch did not conduct interviews in Hong Kong.

As the CCP representative in Hong Kong, Qiao often negotiated with the British Hong Kong authorities. Qiao and Gong were also invited to attend important events of the British Hong Kong authorities many times and were very familiar with the Governor of Hong Kong. In addition, they also interacted with many Western journalists stationed in Hong Kong, accepted interviews, and collected information. Qiao recalled: "From these two things, one is the establishment of Xinhua News Agency, and the other is the publication of China Digest, we can see the two-faced policy of the British government. On the one hand, it wants to establish relations with the United States and the Kuomintang, and on the other hand, it does not reject us and also tries to establish some relations with us."

On January 6, 1950, the United Kingdom recognized the People's Republic of China. The next day, the Guangdong-Guangxi Diplomatic Commissioner's Office of the Ministry of Foreign Affairs of the Republic of China in Kowloon closed down, ending the relationship between the Republic of China and Hong Kong. However, the British authorities firmly refused to allow the People's Republic of China to send a formal official representative office, arguing that the establishment of such an institution in Hong Kong would form "two power centers" and affect the governance and interests of the government of Hong Kong. The UK suggested that the PRC establish a consulate general in Hong Kong. However, if a consulate general was established, it would be tantamount to formally recognizing that Hong Kong was a British dependency or colony, while the PRC has always believed that Hong Kong is Chinese territory. Therefore, China and Britain were deadlocked and finally had to continue the practice of the Xinhua News Agency Hong Kong Branch representing the CCP in negotiating with the Hong Kong government during the civil war. The Hong Kong Branch, as the official representative office of the PRC, continued to handle the Sino-British affairs contacts. At this time, the news team of the Hong Kong branch had expanded to more than 50 people, in addition to an administrative team for negotiating with the Hong Kong government; the Hong Kong and Macao Working Committee of the CCP was located in Guangzhou, under the leadership of the South China Bureau of the Central Committee of the CCP (later the Guangdong Provincial Committee). The secretary of the working committee was Qu Mengjue, who was also the organization minister of the South China Bureau, the deputy secretary was Wang Kuang (also the president of the Xinhua News Agency's South China Branch), and the secretary general was Huang Shimin; the Hong Kong and Macao Working Committee stationed a working group in Hong Kong, headed by Zhang Tiesheng, the special commissioner of the Hong Kong and Macao Working Committee in Hong Kong, and the working group was stationed in the Hong Kong branch; and the president of the Hong Kong branch, Huang Zuomei, had an internal party identity as the deputy special commissioner of the Hong Kong and Macao Working Committee in Hong Kong.

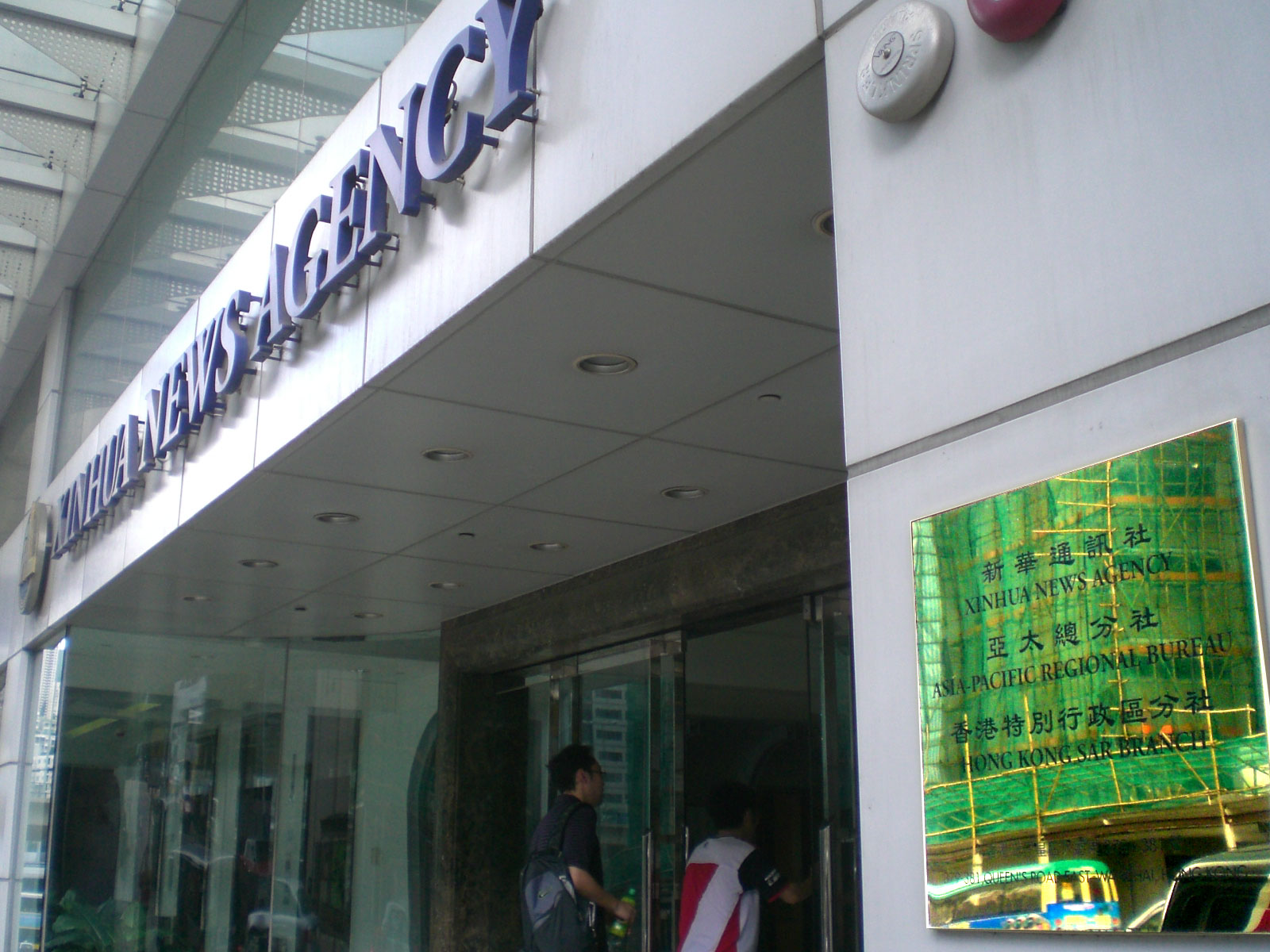
HK Queen's Road East Xinhua News Agency

On April 11, 1955, the Kashmir Princess civil aircraft carrying staff and journalists sent by China to attend the Bandung Conference took off from Hong Kong. A pre-placed bomb exploded during the flight, resulting in the destruction of the aircraft and the death of all passengers. Huang Zuomei, then president of the Hong Kong branch, was also killed. Sino-British relations became tense. In 1956, the pro-KMT rightists in Hong Kong launched the Double Tenth Riots, and Sino-British relations deteriorated further. Afterwards, Zhou Enlai, on behalf of the Chinese government, proposed three conditions to Britain for maintaining the status quo in the long term: (1) Hong Kong should not be used as an international anti-China military base (mainly referring to the fact that it should not be used as a military base for the US Seventh Fleet ); (2) Hong Kong should not be used to subvert China (referring to the Hong Kong authorities' responsibility to stop the sabotage activities of spies sneaking into the mainland from Hong Kong); (3) Chinese institutions and personnel stationed in Hong Kong should be protected. After clearly accepting the above conditions, the relationship between Hong Kong and China remained stable for a long time.

In 1956, Mao Zedong visited Guangdong and criticized the practice of setting up the Hong Kong and Macao Working Committee in Guangzhou for being out of touch with the front line, after which the committee moved back to Hong Kong. In October 1959, Liang Weilin, then Director of the Guangdong Provincial Department of Education, became the president of the Hong Kong branch and the secretary of the Committee. Liang Weilin was a senior revolutionary who had been engaged in armed anti-Japanese work in Dongjiang, Guangdong and Hong Kong and Kowloon for many years. Liang served as the president of the branch for nearly 20 years until the Hong Kong and Macao Affairs Office of the State Council was established in May 1978, which directly led the Hong Kong and Macao Working Committee on behalf of the Central Government. Liang Weilin stepped down on July 12 of the same year. Wang Kuang, who took over as the president of the Hong Kong branch of Xinhua News Agency, was a fellow countryman who was deeply trusted by Liao Chengzhi, then Director of the Hong Kong and Macao Office of the State Council.

In the early 1980s, the Chinese Ministry of Foreign Affairs sent Liang Shangyuan and the Overseas Chinese Affairs Committee of the State Council sent Zhu Manping to serve as the presidents of the Hong Kong branch. At that time, the work of the People's Republic of China in Hong Kong and Macao mainly belonged to overseas Chinese affairs, which was in charge of the Overseas Chinese Affairs Committee of the State Council and led by the Hong Kong and Macao Working Committee through the Guangdong Provincial Party Committee to implement it. In 1983, the Sino-British negotiations on the future of Hong Kong entered the substantive stage. Liao Chengzhi suddenly died at this time, and Ji Pengfei, a senior diplomat who had retired from the front line of work, returned to serve as the director of the Hong Kong and Macao Affairs Office of the State Council. The president of the Hong Kong branch of Xinhua News Agency and the secretary of the Hong Kong and Macao Working Committee of the CCP was also replaced by Xu Jiatun, then a member of the Central Committee of the CCP and the first secretary of the Jiangsu Provincial Party Committee. Ji Pengfei and Xu Jiatun had been engaged in local work and military political work in Jiangsu during the Anti-Japanese War and the Second Civil War between the Kuomintang and the Communist Party, and had long been in a superior-subordinate relationship.

Until 2000, the branch was divided into two parts: the "Editor-in-Chief's Office of Xinhua News Agency Hong Kong Branch", commonly known as "Small Agency" or "Small Xinhua", was located at 5 Sha West Street, Wan Chai, and was under the leadership of the Xinhua News Agency Head Office in terms of business and handled news business; the other was the Hong Kong and Macao Working Committee of the CCP, commonly known as "Big Agency" or "Big Xinhua", which was the party organization of the CCP in Hong Kong. The intelligence officers sent by China to Hong Kong come from the Ministry of Public Security and the Ministry of State Security, and most of them are assigned to the Security Department of the Hong Kong Branch of Xinhua News Agency. The business work of Chinese-funded enterprises in Hong Kong is managed by their respective superiors; however, matters involving Hong Kong and the appointment and removal of cadres of Chinese-funded enterprises are led and approved by the Hong Kong and Macao Working Committee.

After the 1989 Tiananmen Square protests and massacre, Beijing required all Chinese officials in Hong Kong to return to Beijing to "re-register" as a political review. In 1990, Xu Jiatun, then branch director, fled to the United States. In 1991, Chen Zhesheng, then economic director, also fled to France.

=== Hong Kong Special Administrative Region ===
On December 28, 1999, Premier Zhu Rongji chaired the 24th executive meeting of the State Council, at which it was decided that starting from January 18, 2000, the Hong Kong branch of Xinhua News Agency would be renamed the "Liaison Office of the Central People's Government in the Hong Kong Special Administrative Region", and the branch president and vice president would be appointed as the director and deputy director of the Liaison Office. On January 17, 2000, Xinhua News Agency and China Central Television broadcast the State Council's decision at 6:00 p.m. and 7:00 p.m. respectively. The former "Xinhua News Agency Hong Kong Branch" was reorganized, with Xinhua News Agency Hong Kong Special Administrative Region Branch Co., Ltd. returning to its original nature as a news agency, while the Hong Kong Working Committee of the CCP Central Committee was separated and became the Hong Kong Liaison Office. At 10:00 a.m. on January 18, 2000, a simple unveiling ceremony was held outside the main gate of the office building.

At 5:25 pm on November 2, 2019, during the 2019–2020 Hong Kong protests, protesters damaged the glass and gates of the Xinhua News Agency's Hong Kong branch and threw Molotov cocktails into the lobby.
