= Cao Shumin =

Chinese politician (born 1966)

- 曹淑敏
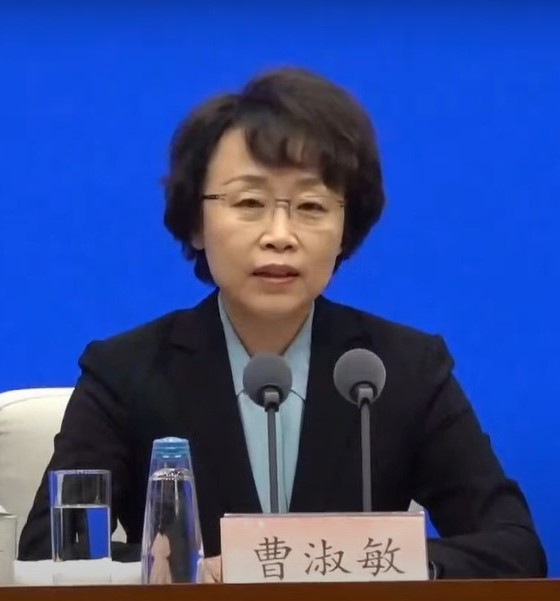
- Cao in 2022

Director of the National Radio and Television Administration
- Incumbent
- Assumed office May 11, 2023
- Premier: Li Qiang
- Preceded by: Xu Lin

Communist Party Secretary of Yingtan
- In office January 2017 – December 2017
- Preceded by: Chen Xingchao
- Succeeded by: Guo An

Mayor of Yingtan
- In office August 2016 – July 2017
- Preceded by: Xiong Maoping
- Succeeded by: Yu Xiuming

Personal details
- Born: July 1966 (age 60) Shulu County, Hebei, China (now Xinji city, Hebei, China)
- Party: Chinese Communist Party
- Education: Beihang University; Renmin University / Hong Kong Polytechnic University

Cao Shumin (Chinese: 曹淑敏; pinyin: Cáo Shūmǐn; born July 1966) is a Chinese politician, who is currently serving as the director of the National Radio and Television Administration. She also served as the deputy head of the Cyberspace Administration of China, from 2021 to 2023. Cao was previously the mayor of Yingtan city.

== Early life and education ==
Born in 1966 in Shulu County in Shijiazhuang, Hebei, Cao studied electromagnetic fields and microwave technology in the Department of Electronic Engineering at Beihang University and in September 1989, she pursued postgraduate studies in the same field and obtained a master's degree in engineering at the same institution in 1992. From November 2004 to November 2007, she studied joint management program at Renmin University of China and Hong Kong Polytechnic University, and obtained a doctorate in management.

== Career ==
From 1992, Cao served as an assistant engineer and engineer at the Telecommunications Transmission Research Institute of the Ministry of Posts and Telecommunications. In 1995, she was appointed as the deputy director of the Wireless Department. Half a month later, she was promoted to the position of deputy director of the Telecommunications Transmission Research Institute, becoming the youngest deputy director in the history of the institute. In July 2001, she was appointed as the deputy director of the Second Business Division of the institute. In September 2002, she became the vice president of the institute. In 2008, she was elected as a member of the 11th National Committee of the Chinese People's Political Consultative Conference (CPPCC), representing the China Association for Science and Technology and was assigned to the 23rd group. She also served as a member of the Committee of Education, Science, Culture, Health and Sports.

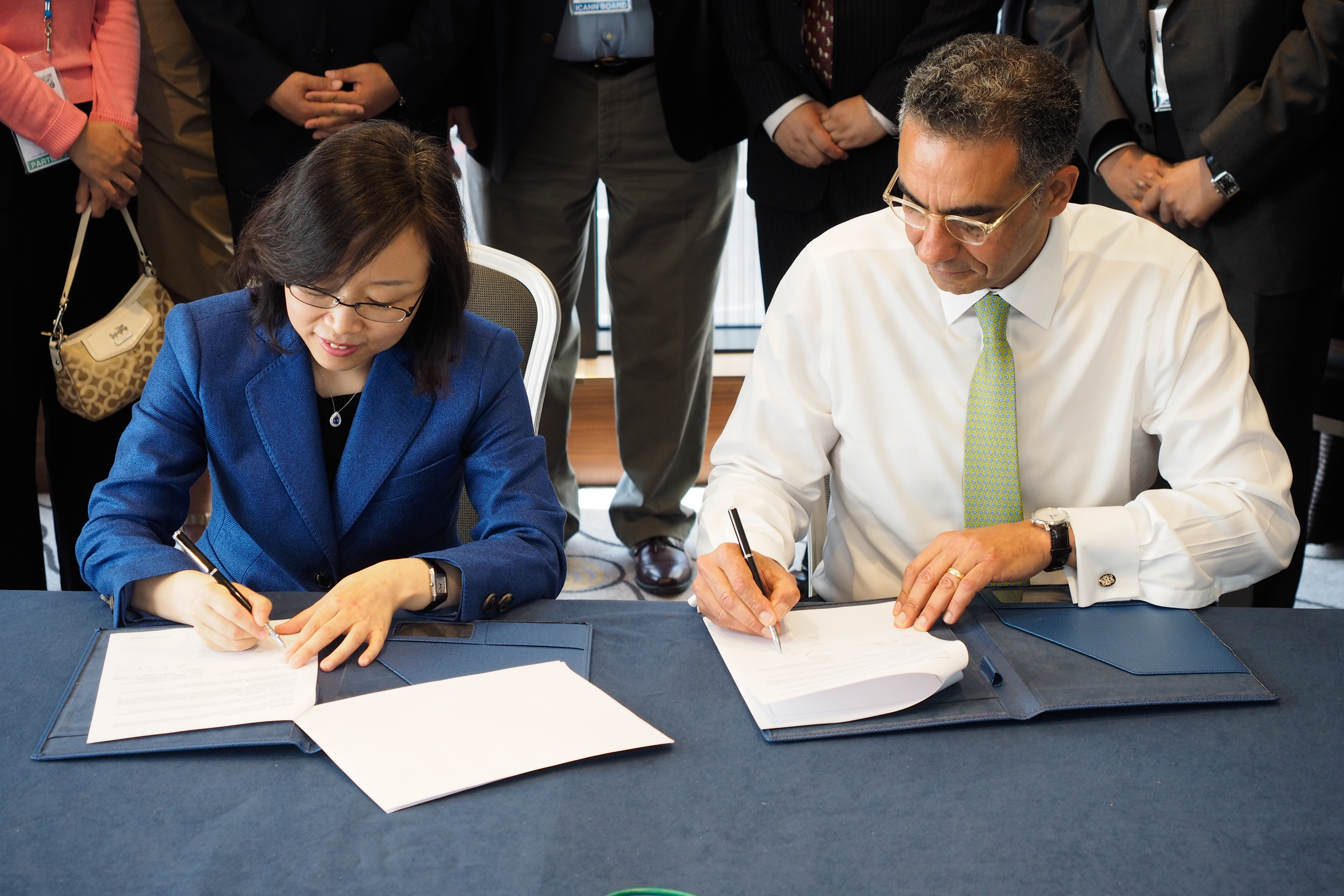
Cao signing a MoU with ICANN CEO Fadi Chehadé (2014)

Cao was appointed Vice President of the Telecommunications Research Institute in December 2008 and became its President in April 2011. She played a key role in China's telecommunications development, leading the TD-LTE Working Group and 4G Promotion Group. She was also involved in national technology projects and advisory committees. This made Cao instrumental in the establishment of China's 4G mobile network. In November 2012, she was elected as an alternate of the 18th Central Committee of the Chinese Communist Party. In June 2014, she became President of the China Academy of Information and Communications Technology.

In August 2016, Cao was transferred to Jiangxi as part of a central-local exchange program. She was appointed as the deputy secretary of the CCP Yingtan Municipal Committee and was nominated by the authorities as a candidate for the mayor of Yingtan. She subsequently assumed the role of acting mayor of Yingtan and was formally elected as mayor in November of the same year. In January 2017, she succeeded Chen Xingchao as the Secretary of the CCP Yingtan Municipal Committee, and in October of the same year, she was elected as an alternate of the 19th Central Committee of the Chinese Communist Party. During her tenure in Yingtan, the city hosted the 14th China Information Harbour Forum on April 13, 2017, where the discussions at the forum delved deeply into the missions and responsibilities confronting the information and communication industry, with a focus on advancing the vision of establishing a robust Internet presence. In January 2017, General Secretary of the Chinese Communist Party Xi Jinping met with Cao and praised her contribution to China's cyber space development.

In December 2017, Cao returned to Beijing and was appointed as the Party Committee Secretary of Beihang University. In November 2018, she was elected as a part-time Vice Chairperson of the All-China Women's Federation. In December 2021, she transitioned to the role of deputy director of the Office of the Central Cyberspace Affairs Commission. During this time, she wrote an article in the state-run People's Daily on the importance of ideological and political education, stating that political indoctrination is a fundamental aspect of higher education and should be integrated into every stage of teaching and learning. In October 2022, she was elected as an alternate of the 20th Central Committee of the Chinese Communist Party. In May 2023, she was promoted to deputy director of the Publicity Department of the Chinese Communist Party and at the same time also promoted to the director of the National Radio and Television Administration, succeeding Xu Lin who was appointed as the CCP secretary of Guizhou. This made her the youngest female senior official at the full ministerial level in China. Cao was also concurrently appointed as the vice minister of the Central Propaganda Department and party group secretary, achieving the rank of full ministerial-level. At a press conference organised by the State Council Information Office on October 19, 2023, Cao stated that "radio and TV, as prominent players in mainstream media, play a crucial role in deepening the understanding and dissemination of Xi Jinping Thought" and "their objective is to make the Party's innovative theories accessible to the general public by using engaging narratives and easy-to-comprehend language".

Government offices
Preceded by Xu Lin	Director of the National Radio and Television Administration; 2023-present	Incumbent
Preceded by Xiong Maoping	Mayor of Yingtan; 2016–2017	Succeeded by Yu Xiuming
Party political offices
Preceded by Chen Xingchao	Communist Party Secretary of Yingtan; 2017–2021	Succeeded by Guo An
