= Xinhua Daily =

Simplified Chinese newspaper

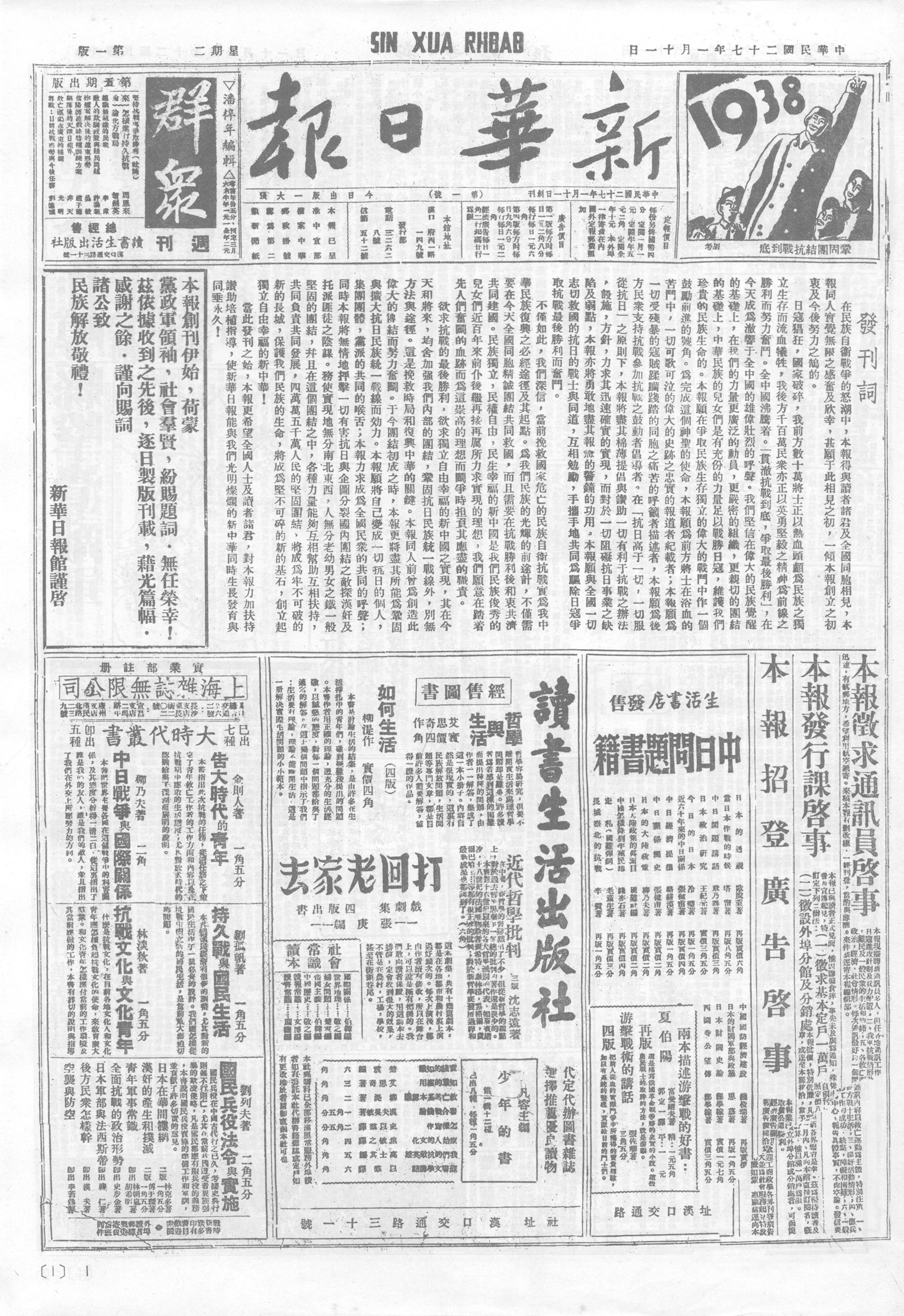
- First issue of the Xinhua Daily published 11 January 1938
- Native name: 新华日报
- Type: Daily newspaper
- Owner: Jiangsu Provincial Committee of the Chinese Communist Party
- Founded: 11 January 1938
- Political alignment: Chinese Communist Party
- Language: Chinese
- Headquarters: Xinhua Newspaper Media Plaza, No. 369 Jiangdong Middle Road, Jianye District, Nanjing City, Jiangsu Province, People's Republic of China
- OCLC number: 779979039
- Website: xh.xhby.net

Xinhua Daily (simplified Chinese: 新华日报; traditional Chinese: 新華日報; pinyin: Xīnhuá rìbào) was the first newspaper published in the People's Republic of China by the Chinese Communist Party (CCP). It is owned by the Jiangsu Provincial Committee of the CCP.

== History ==
The Xinhua Daily was founded in Hankou on 11 January 1938. After the fall of Wuhan in October 1938, the paper continued to publish in Chongqing. The Xinhua Daily was the only newspaper published by the CCP during the Second Sino-Japanese War, and was published by the party in order to consolidate public sentiment against the Japanese. As a propaganda instrument, the paper faced competition from the Jiefang Daily, which began publishing on 16 May 1941 under the direct control of Mao Zedong. The Jiefang Daily was created as part of Mao's larger strategy to move the CCP's propaganda arm under his direct control - the Xinhua Daily had moved to Chongqing and was not controlled by Mao. The Chongqing edition of the Xinhua Daily was controlled directly by Zhou Enlai until February 1947.

Among the points of negotiation in the Second United Front was the ability of the Communist Party to openly publish newspapers and periodicals in KMT areas. In late August 1937, Zhou and Kuomintang (KMT) Central Publicity Department head Shao Lizi agreed that the newspapers Xinhua Daily and Chuin Chung Weekly would be published in these areas.

To protest censorship by the KMT government, Xinhua Daily marked articles censored by the government through techniques such as "opening a skylight" (leaving blank space where a censored article out have been) or explicit statements like "following deleted by order". In an effort to protect readers from being detected, Xinhua Daily generally printed only ads on the front cover.

In March 2018, Xinhua Daily won the Third National Top 100 Newspapers in China. In June 2022, Jiangsu launched an international communication center called JiangsuNow, which is run by Xinhua Daily.

=== Political positions ===
In the relatively liberal media environment of war-time Chongqing, the Xinhua Daily competed with other publications of different affiliations, as the Kuomintang was not able to exert ironclad control over speech. However hardline supporters of the Kuomintang made serious attempts to stifle the Xinhua Daily as a newspaper of the CCP, such as refusing to grant it legal rights for paper distribution, exerting control over post offices and newspaper vendors, and by implementing a newspaper censorship system that inspected all content published by the paper.

Other newspapers publishing in Chongqing included the Ta Kung Pao (then an independent newspaper also known as L'Impartial) and a Kuomintang newspaper, the Zhongyang Ribao (Central Daily News), along with many other smaller papers. Along with L'Impartial, the Xinhua Daily published vernacular poetry, compared to the strictly classical poetry published by Central Daily News. Written vernacular Chinese (Chinese: 白話; pinyin: baihua) had been associated with the progressive movement since the New Culture Movement in 1917, whereas the classical language was associated with conservatism. Xinhua Daily published a number of poems by the poet Liu Yazi, many of which commented on the arrival of Mao in Chongqing in 1945 for peace talks with Chiang Kai-shek. Mao was then believed to be a proponent of multiparty democracy that Xinhua Daily championed regularly.

== Coverage ==
The Xinhua Daily was formed during the latter part of the Nanjing Massacre and began publishing news reports of the Japanese Army's atrocities after January 1938, particularly after Western reporting on the topic dwindled in February 1938.
