= Gu Xiulian =

Chinese politician

- 顾秀莲

Chairwoman of the All-China Women's Federation
- In office 2003–2008
- Preceded by: Peng Peiyun
- Succeeded by: Chen Zhili

Minister of Chemical Industry
- In office 1989–1998
- Preceded by: Qin Zhongda
- Succeeded by: Position abolished

Governor of Jiangsu
- In office May 1983 – April 1989
- Preceded by: Han Peixin
- Succeeded by: Chen Huanyou

Personal details
- Born: December 1936 (age 89) Nantong, Jiangsu, Republic of China
- Party: Chinese Communist Party (1956–2008)
- Children: 2 sons
- Education: Shenyang College of Metallurgy and Mechanics

Gu Xiulian (Chinese: 顾秀莲; pinyin: Gù Xiùlián; born December 1936) is a retired Chinese politician who was the first female provincial governor in the People's Republic of China. She served as Governor of Jiangsu from 1983 to 1989, Minister of Chemical Industry from 1989 to 1998, Vice Chairwoman of the Standing Committee of the 10th National People's Congress, and Chairwoman of the All-China Women's Federation.

== Early life and education ==
Gu Xiulian was born into a peasant family in Nantong, Jiangsu Province in December 1936. The eldest of five children, she helped her parents with household chores from a young age, and did not go to school until she was nine. She studied at Nantong Girls' Normal School and then Nantong Third High School, and was offered much help from the headmistress and a fellow student, to whom she showed much gratitude after her rise to prominence.

Gu finished junior high school in 1953, during the Korean War. As one of the many young women who were at the time recruited to train as cadres, she enrolled in a police school in Shenyang, northeast China, and became a policewoman in Benxi, Liaoning Province in October 1954. At the same time she also won trophies in basketball and attended night school to earn a high school diploma. She joined the Chinese Communist Party in September 1956. She entered Benxi Iron and Steel College in 1958, and then transferred to Shenyang College of Metallurgy and Mechanics.

== Career ==
After graduating in 1961, Gu was assigned to work in China's largest nickel mine of Jinchuan, in poverty stricken Gansu Province of northwest China. She was transferred to Beijing three years later, to join her husband who was working there. While in Beijing, she worked in the Ministry of Textile Industry.

During the tumultuous years of the Cultural Revolution, the State Planning Commission became paralyzed, and Gu was a member of the Planning Drafting Group which took over the economic planning of China. Working directly under top leaders such as Zhou Enlai, Li Xiannian, and Yu Qiuli, Gu earned the trust of the heavily persecuted "old guard", to whom she showed respect. In 1973, she was elevated to deputy chair of the State Planning Commission in charge of light industry, including textiles. During her tenure, she encouraged the introduction of technology and investment in consumer industries such as beer brewing and synthetic fiber, meeting consumer demand while increasing government revenue. She became an alternate member of the 11th Central Committee of the Chinese Communist Party in 1977, and a full member of the 12th Central Committee in 1982. She would continue to serve as a Central Committee member until the end of the 15th Central Committee in 2002.

In 1982, Gu was transferred to her home province of Jiangsu to serve as CCP Committee Secretary (the party chief was then called "first secretary") in charge of economy. The following year, she was elected Governor of Jiangsu by the Provincial People's Congress, making her the first female provincial governor in the history of the People's Republic of China. During her tenure, she focused her efforts on improving agricultural yields in the poorer northern Jiangsu, while encouraged the development of "village and township enterprises" in the south, taking advantage of its proximity to the major industrial center of Shanghai. The small scale enterprises helped lift peasants out of poverty and were hailed as a model for all of China. She also oversaw the development of large-scale industrial facilities such as Yizheng Chemical Fibre and Qixiashan Chemical Fertilizer Plant.

In 1989, Gu returned to the national government to serve as Minister of Chemical Industry. She set the goal of making 10 billion dollars of export revenue, and attracting 10 billion yuan of foreign investment at the end of the 20th century. She promoted the modernization of management method and technology in the industry. She visited many foreign countries, and struck deals with leading international chemical companies such as Bayer, DuPont, and Eastman to set up joint ventures in China. She served as Minister of Chemical Industry until March 1998.

Gu was Vice Chairwoman of the All-China Women's Federation from 1998 to 2003, and Chairwoman from 2003 to 2008. She also concurrently served as a Vice Chair of the Standing Committee of the 10th National People's Congress from 2003 to 2008.

On March 6, 2008, following a review by the Organization Department of the CPC Central Committee, Wang Bingqian stepped down as Director of the China National Committee for the Wellbeing of the Next Generation, and Gu Xiulian was appointed as Director.。

== Family ==
Gu Xiulian's husband is said to be a mathematician working for China's Institute of Atomic Energy Research. They have two sons, probably born in the 1970s.

Political offices
Preceded by Han Peixin	Governor of Jiangsu; 1983–1989	Succeeded by Chen Huanyou
