= Shen Daren =

Chinese politician

Party Secretary of Jiangsu
- In office December 1989 – September 1993
- Preceded by: Han Peixin
- Succeeded by: Chen Huanyou

Personal details
- Born: August 1928 Wu County, Jiangsu, China
- Died: August 2, 2017 (aged 89) Beijing, China
- Party: Chinese Communist Party

Shen Daren (Chinese: 沈达人; August 1928 – August 2, 2017) was a Chinese politician from Jiangsu province. He was best known for his terms as the Chinese Communist Party Committee Secretary of Ningxia between 1986 and 1989 and party secretary of his home province between 1989 and 1993.

== Biography ==
Shen grew up in Changzhou, Jiangsu. He began work as a technician at a textiles factory, where he rose through the ranks to become a supervisor, then deputy head of the factory. In 1960, he entered the apparat, serving in the textiles department of the city of Changzhou. In 1968, during the Cultural Revolution, he became Revolutionary Committee head of the Changzhou department of textiles industry. Following the Cultural Revolution, he was promoted to deputy party chief of Changzhou, then mayor, and then party chief. In 1983, he was elevated further to become Deputy Party Secretary of Jiangsu province. Three years later, he became party chief of the Ningxia Hui Autonomous Region.

In December 1989, Shen was transferred back to Jiangsu to become chief of Jiangsu Provincial Committee of the Chinese Communist Party. He assumed the post of the Chairman of the Jiangsu People's Congress in 1993.

Shen was a delegate to the 8th National People's Congress (1993–1998) and 9th National People's Congress (1998–2003).

Shen died on August 2, 2017, in Nanjing. The party assigned him standard honors of a deceased comrade. In his official obituary, the party mentioned his "commitment to party unity" during the "political storm between the spring and summer of 1989", a euphemism for the democracy movement. His funeral was attended by Jiangsu party chief Li Qiang and Governor Wu Zhenglong; he received wreaths and condolences from Xi Jinping, Li Keqiang, Jiang Zemin, Hu Jintao, Li Peng and his wife Zhu Lin, and a long list of other retired and incumbent officials.

Party political offices
Preceded by Li Xuezhi	Party Secretary of Ningxia; 1986–1989	Succeeded by Huang Huang
Preceded by Han Peixin	Party Secretary of Jiangsu; 1989–1993	Succeeded by Chen Huanyou
Political offices
Preceded by Han Peixin	People's Congress Chairman of Jiangsu; 1993–1998	Succeeded by Chen Huanyou
