= Zhou Yifeng =

Chinese businessman

- Born: Zhou Yifeng; 1977 or 1978 (age 46–47)
- Education: Nanjing University of Science and Technology
- Known for: Founder and chairman of Oriental Energy Company
- Spouse: married

Zhou Yifeng (born 1977/1978) is a Chinese businessman and billionaire who founded the liquefied petroleum gas Shenzhen-listed Oriental Energy Company.

He holds degrees from the Beijing University of Traditional Chinese Medicine and the Nanjing University of Science and Technology.

He is married and lives in Zhangjiagang, China.

Forbes lists his net worth as of April 2022 at US$1.0 billion.
