= Chen Huanyou =

Chinese politician

- 陈焕友

Party Secretary of Jiangsu
- In office September 1993 – December 2000
- Preceded by: Shen Daren
- Succeeded by: Hui Liangyu

Governor of Jiangsu
- In office April 1989 – September 1994
- Preceded by: Gu Xiulian
- Succeeded by: Zheng Silin

Personal details
- Born: 1934 (age 91–92) Nantong, Jiangsu, China
- Party: Chinese Communist Party
- Education: Renmin University of China, Harbin Institute of Technology

Chen Huanyou (Chinese: 陈焕友; born 1934) is a retired Chinese politician who served as Governor and Party Secretary of Jiangsu Province.

Chen was born in Nantong, Jiangsu. In March 1950, he entered PLA's Northeast University of Military and Politics and served in the army. In 1952, he enrolled at the industrial economics department of Renmin University of China, and later at engineering economics department at Harbin Institute of Technology.

He was elected governor of Jiangsu in April 1989. He became the secretary of Jiangsu Provincial Committee of the Chinese Communist Party in September 1993.

He was a member of the 14th and 15th Central Committee of the Chinese Communist Party.

His major works include "Practices and Thoughts on Jiangsu's Modern Construction", "Introduction to Jiangsu by Chen Huanyou" and "Ten-year Exploration in Jiangsu's Modern Construction".
