= Zhang Guocheng =

Chinese engineer (1931–2022)

- 张国成
- Born: 12 October 1931; Kunming, Yunnan, China
- Died: 21 December 2022 (aged 91); Beijing, China
- Education: Yunnan University; Kunming University of Science and Technology
- Scientific career
- Fields: Rare earth smelting
- Workplaces: General Research Institute for Nonferrous Metals

Chinese name
- Simplified Chinese: 张国成
- Traditional Chinese: 張國成
Transcriptions
Standard Mandarin
- Hanyu Pinyin: Zhāng Guóchéng

Zhang Guocheng (Chinese: 张国成; 12 October 1931 – 21 December 2022) was a Chinese engineer, and an academician of the Chinese Academy of Engineering.

== Biography ==
Zhang was born in Kunming, Yunnan, on 12 October 1931.

He entered the Arts and Crafts Corps of the Logistics and Political Department of the Fourth Corps of the PLA Second Field Army in January 1950, and worked for a year. In January 1952, he was accepted to Yunnan University, majoring in the Department of Metallurgy. Two years later, he went on to attend Kunming Institute of Technology (now Kunming University of Science and Technology), where he majored in the Department of Metallurgy. After graduating in January 1956, he was assigned to the General Research Institute for Nonferrous Metals, where he worked until retirement.

On 21 December 2022, Zhang died in Beijing, at the age of 91, from COVID-19.

== Honours and awards ==
- 1987 State Technological Invention Award (Third Class)
- 1990 State Science and Technology Progress Award (Third Class)
- 1995 Member of the Chinese Academy of Engineering (CAE)
- 1997 Science and Technology Achievement Award of the Ho Leung Ho Lee Foundation
- 1999 State Science and Technology Progress Award (Second Class)
