= Xu Jiatun =

Chinese politician (1916–2016)

- 许家屯

Party Secretary of Jiangsu
- In office February 1977 – April 1983
- Preceded by: Peng Chong
- Succeeded by: Han Peixin

Governor of Jiangsu
- In office February 1977 – December 1979
- Preceded by: Peng Chong
- Succeeded by: Hui Yuyu

Director of the Xinhua News Agency Hong Kong Branch
- In office 1983–1990
- Preceded by: Wang Kuang
- Succeeded by: Zhou Nan

Personal details
- Born: 10 March 1916 Rugao, Nantong, Jiangsu, China
- Died: 29 June 2016 (aged 100) Los Angeles, California, U.S.
- Party: Chinese Communist Party (until 1991)
- Occupation: Politician

Xu Jiatun (Chinese: 许家屯; 10 March 1916 – 29 June 2016) was a Chinese politician and dissident. He was the Chinese Communist Party Committee Secretary of Jiangsu Province from 1977 to 1983 and the Governor of Jiangsu from 1977 to 1979. After sympathizing with the 1989 Tiananmen Square student protests, he left the country and lived in self-exile in the United States.

== Career ==
Xu was the member of the 11th and 12th Central Committee of the Chinese Communist Party from 1977 to 1987. He was the Chinese Communist Party secretary of Jiangsu Province from 1977 to 1983 and the Governor of Jiangsu from 1977 to 1979. He became the director of the Hong Kong branch of the Xinhua News Agency from 1983 to 1989, then China's de facto political presence in the territory. He participated in the preparatory works of the establishment of the Hong Kong SAR and was vice-chairman of the Hong Kong Basic Law Drafting Committee.

Xu sympathized with the Tiananmen Square student protests in 1989. After the military crackdown in June, he fled to the United States and lived there in exile. He was later expelled from the CCP. In 1994, he published memoirs.

Xu later lived in Orange County, California, United States. In 1997, he joined an appeal to the National Congress of the Chinese Communist Party in Beijing to reverse the government report condemning the 1989 Tiananmen student protests. In a 2016 interview with the Hong Kong journalist Simon Kei Shek Ming, published in Initium Media, Xu, who had been recently released from hospital, predicted that Xi Jinping would arrest "higher level" tigers in the CCP. He died in June 2016 at the age of 100.
