= Han Peixin =

Chinese politician

Party Secretary of Jiangsu
- In office April 1983 – December 1989
- Preceded by: Xu Jiatun
- Succeeded by: Shen Daren

Governor of Jiangsu
- In office December 1981 – May 1983
- Preceded by: Hui Yuyu
- Succeeded by: Gu Xiulian

Personal details
- Born: October 1921 Xiangshui, Jiangsu, China
- Died: 15 January 2017 (aged 95) Nanjing, Jiangsu, China

Han Peixin (Chinese: 韩培信; October 1921 – 15 January 2017) was a People's Republic of China politician. He was born in Xiangshui County, Jiangsu Province. In the 1980s he served as Chinese Communist Party Committee Secretary and Governor of his home province. He was a member of the 12th and 13th Central Committees of the Chinese Communist Party. He was a delegate to the 5th (1978–1983), 6th (1983–1988) and 7th National People's Congress (1988–1993).

Han died in Nanjing on 15 January 2017.

Preceded by Xu Jiatun	Party Secretary of Jiangsu; 1983–1989	Succeeded by Shen Daren
Preceded by Hui Yuyu	Governor of Jiangsu; 1982–1983	Succeeded by Gu Xiulian
Preceded by Chu Jiang	People's Congress Chairman of Jiangsu; 1988–1993	Succeeded by Shen Daren
