= Bao Houchang =

Chinese politician

Bao Houchang (Chinese: 包厚昌)
- Born: 1911; Wuxi, Jiangsu Province
- Died: 1992 (aged 80–81)
- Other names: Zhao Danian (Chinese: 赵大年), Zhou Baisheng (Chinese: 周柏生)
- Occupation: politician

Bao Houchang (Chinese: 包厚昌) (1911–1992), also known by the names Zhao Danian (Chinese: 赵大年) and Zhou Baisheng (Chinese: 周柏生), was a Chinese politician. He was born in Wuxi, Jiangsu Province. During the Second Sino-Japanese War, he was a member of the New Fourth Army. He was CPPCC Committee Chairman of his home province.

Preceded by Hui Yuyu	CPPCC Committee Chairman of Jiangsu	Succeeded by Qian Zhonghan
