= Xu Shiyou =

Chinese general

- 许世友
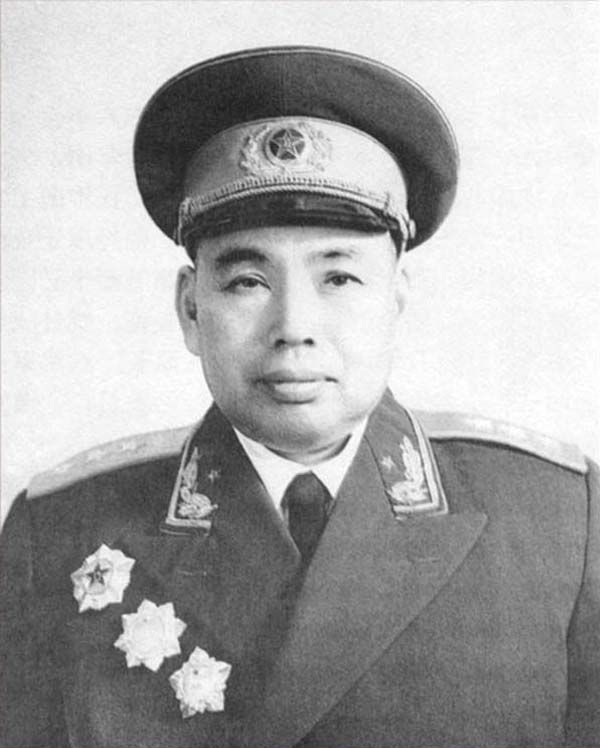

Personal details
- Born: 1906 Xinxian, Henan, Qing China
- Died: October 22, 1985 (aged 78–79) Nanjing, Jiangsu, China
- Party: Chinese Communist Party (joined in 1927)

Military service
- Allegiance: People's Republic of China
- Branch/service: Beiyang Army; National Revolutionary Army; Chinese Red Army; Eighth Route Army; People's Liberation Army Ground Force
- Years of service: 1920–1985
- Rank: General
- Battles/wars: Second Sino-Japanese War; Chinese Civil War; Korean War; Sino-Vietnamese War
- Awards: Order of August 1 (1st Class Medal; 1955); Order of Independence and Freedom (1st Class Medal; 1955); Order of Liberation (1st Class Medal; 1955)

Xu Shiyou (Chinese: 许世友; pinyin: Xǔ Shìyǒu; Wade–Giles: Hsü Shih-yu, 1905 or 1906 – 22 October 1985) was a general of the Chinese People's Liberation Army (PLA). A former novice at the Shaolin Temple, he rose through the Red Army, fought in the Second Sino-Japanese War and the Chinese Civil War, and was made a general in 1955. He commanded the Nanjing Military Region for nearly two decades and then the Guangzhou Military Region, sat on the Politburo from 1969 to 1982, and commanded the eastern front in the 1979 war with Vietnam.

== Early life ==
Xu was born into a poor peasant family in Xujiawa, then in Macheng, Hubei, and now in Xin County, Henan. Xinhua gives his birth as February 1905, while other sources give 1906. He studied martial arts at the Shaolin Temple for eight years, but left after hearing that his family was in trouble. In memory of his training, he took the name Shiyou, written with characters meaning "friend of Buddhism", which he later changed to a homophone meaning "friend of the world". He then became a soldier and served as a company commander in the National Revolutionary Army. He joined the Communist Youth League in September 1926 and the Chinese Communist Party in August 1927, and in November 1927, he took part in the Huangma Uprising.

== Military career ==
Xu first appeared in Chinese military records in Hubei in 1927, in a nascent unit that also included the future generals Qin Jiwei and Chen Zaidao. In the base area's campaigns against Nationalist encirclement, he twice led "dare-to-die" squads, and he rose from platoon leader to regimental, divisional and army commander. From 1933, he led the 25th Division of the 9th Corps of the Fourth Front Army under Xu Xiangqian, with Chen Xilian as his deputy. He later commanded the 4th Army. He led the three-month defense of Wanyuan in the Sichuan–Shaanxi base area.

During the Long March, Xu remained with Zhang Guotao's Fourth Front Army, which was battered by Nationalist and warlord troops before it reached Yan'an in poor shape in October 1936. At the end of 1936, he entered the Red Army University. In the first half of 1937, as the party purged Zhang and his closest officers, Fourth Front Army cadets at the Counter-Japanese Military and Political University, including Xu, confronted the leadership over accusations that Zhang was disloyal. In April 1937, Xu and other cadres planned to leave with their weapons, and the plot led to his arrest. His second wife, Lei Mingzhen, divorced him at this time. He was released after Mao Zedong intervened, and the historian Patrick Fuliang Shan has examined how he went on to become one of Mao's most loyal commanders.

=== Second Sino-Japanese War ===
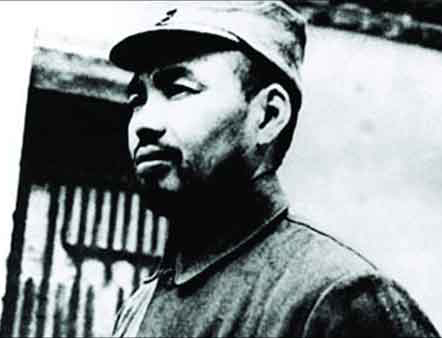
Xu Shiyou in 1939

In 1938, Xu became deputy commander of the 386th Brigade of the 129th Division. In 1940, he took command of the 3rd Brigade of the Eighth Route Army's Shandong Column, and in 1942, he became the column's chief of staff and commander of the Jiaodong Military Region. One of his key deputies during the war was Nie Fengzhi, who later commanded the Chinese People's Volunteers Air Force in the Korean War. Xu remained in Shandong until 1954.

=== Chinese Civil War ===
In 1947, Xu commanded the 9th Column of the East China Field Army in the Laiwu and Menglianggu campaigns. In August 1947, he took command of the field army's East Front Corps, later the Shandong Corps, and led it in the defense of Jiaodong and in the Zhouzhang, Weixian, Yanzhou and Jinan campaigns. His political commissar, Tan Zhenlin, was one of the most powerful figures in East China, and their forces took Jinan in September 1948. In 1949, he became deputy commander and then commander of the Shandong Military District.

=== People's Republic of China ===
After 1949, Xu became a member of the East China Military and Administrative Committee under Chen Yi and Su Yu. During the Korean War, he took a seat on Shandong's governing committee and commanded its military district, preparing against a feared American landing. In Shandong, he worked closely with Gu Mu and Kang Sheng. In 1953, he commanded the 3rd Army Group of the Chinese People's Volunteers in Korea. After returning, he became second deputy commander of the East China Military Region and a deputy chief of the PLA General Staff. In 1955, he was made one of the PLA's 57 generals (shangjiang).

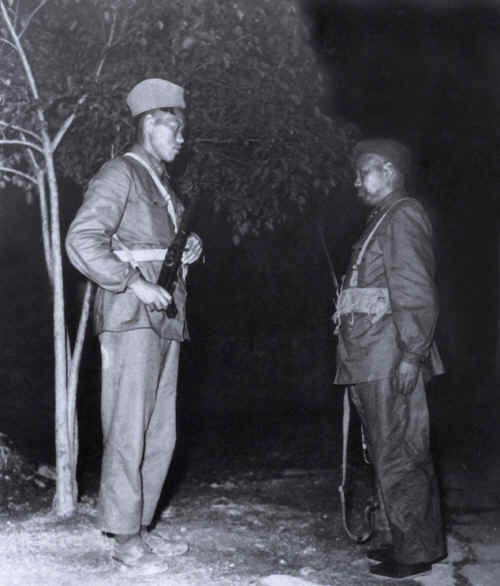
Xu (right), then commander of the Nanjing Military Region, voluntarily requested to join his company; the photo shows his shift with the soldier (1958)

Xu then took command of the Nanjing Military Region, and in 1959, he also became a vice minister of national defense. In 1959, his 12th and 60th Corps returned from Korea to the Nanjing Military Region, where they provided the power base he would enjoy well into the 1970s. He was elected an alternate member of the 8th Central Committee in 1956.

=== Cultural Revolution ===
In Nanjing, where the military took control during the Cultural Revolution, Xu's tilt toward the "Anti" faction created dissent within the Military Control Committee, according to Dong Guoqiang and Andrew G. Walder. In 1967, Gang of Four member Zhang Chunqiao told the student leader Kuai Dafu that Xu was disloyal. Understanding the danger, Xu retreated with trusted subordinates to a secret military site in Anhui, and on 18 August 1967, Mao met him and promised that neither he nor the Nanjing Military Region would be overthrown. When the Jiangsu Provincial Revolutionary Committee was established in March 1968, Xu took the top post, ushering in what Dong and Walder call "a more confident and repressive military control". In 1970, he also became first secretary of the Jiangsu Provincial Committee of the Chinese Communist Party. He was elected to the Politburo of the 9th Central Committee in 1969 and remained a member through the 11th.

=== Guangzhou Military Region ===
In December 1973, when Mao reshuffled the commanders of eight military regions, Xu exchanged posts with Ding Sheng and took command of the Guangzhou Military Region, which he led until 1980. In 1976, after the death of Zhou Enlai, Xu and political commissar Wei Guoqing provided protection for Deng Xiaoping when the Gang of Four purged him.

=== Sino-Vietnamese War ===
At a meeting of the Central Military Commission on New Year's Eve 1978, Deng appointed Xu to command operations against Vietnam from Guangxi in the east, while Yang Dezhi of the Wuhan Military Region commanded from Yunnan in the west. According to the historian Xiaoming Zhang, unconfirmed rumors held that the change of command in Yunnan stemmed partly from a poor personal relationship between Xu and the Kunming commander, Wang Bicheng. Jonathan Spence describes Xu as the commander in chief of the Chinese forces in the war, which began on 17 February 1979.

The central leadership specifically required Xu to stop operations and pull his troops back after taking Lạng Sơn and Cao Bằng, to keep the war from getting out of control. Xu responded with an approach known as niudao shaji ("using a butcher's knife to kill a chicken"), concentrating overwhelming force and expecting his troops to cut the Vietnamese defenses into pieces and destroy them. The slow advance of his deep-strike divisions forced him to hold back an immediate attack on Cao Bằng, and only three days later did he and his staff realize that the town was defended by a small force. At Lạng Sơn, Xu reorganized the plan and urged his troops to attack more forcefully, then decided to push on across the Kỳ Cùng River. Beijing endorsed this decision but announced the withdrawal on 5 March.

Zhang notes that leaders of the Guangzhou Military Region received complaints from the rank and file about Xu's leadership style, since he had not commanded them before. In his later book on the conflict, Zhang concludes that the PLA was grossly unprepared, forcing a postponement of the attack, and that its claimed casualty ratios were probably inflated, with Vietnamese losses at least equal to and likely greater than China's.

== Later life and death ==
In 1980, Xu became a member of the Standing Committee of the Central Military Commission. In September 1982, he was the only military officer named a founding vice chairman of the Central Advisory Commission. He died in Nanjing on 22 October 1985. Burial ran counter to the party's drive to reform funeral customs, but Xu had asked the Central Committee to let him be buried near his mother, saying that he would be "loyal in life and filial in death", and the central authorities granted a special exception. According to the Xinyang Daily, Deng Xiaoping approved the arrangement. Xu was buried on Lailong Ridge at Xujiawa, in Hepu Village, Tianpu Township, Xin County, about 40 meters from his parents' joint grave. The grave at first had no tombstone, and a year later, Wang Zhen proposed a stone inscribed only "Tomb of Comrade Xu Shiyou", without titles or any account of his career.

== Personal life ==
Xu's second wife, Lei Mingzhen, divorced him after his arrest in 1937. His third wife, Tian Pu, an Eighth Route Army veteran whom he married in Shandong during the Second Sino-Japanese War, died in Beijing on 30 June 2017, aged 93. Xu's eldest son, Xu Guang, spent seven years in training and thirteen years at sea in the navy, becoming one of the People's Republic's first ship captains with a university degree. At his father's request, he left the navy and returned to Xin County to care for his grandmother, and he later became a deputy director of the county people's congress standing committee. He died there on 6 January 2013, aged 84. According to Xinhunan, he was a model for the boy hero Pan Dongzi in the film Sparkling Red Star. Xu's youngest son, Xu Yuanchao, was appointed commander of the Jiangsu Military District in 2009.

== Works ==
- Xu Shiyou (1981). 我在山东十六年 [My Sixteen Years in Shandong] (in Chinese). Jinan: Shandong People's Publishing House.
- Xu Shiyou (1983). 我在红军十年 [My Ten Years in the Red Army] (in Chinese). Beijing: Zhanshi Publishing House.
- Xu Shiyou (1986). 许世友回忆录 [Memoirs of Xu Shiyou] (in Chinese). Beijing: PLA Publishing House.

Military offices
| Preceded by Zhang Yunyi | Commander of the PLA Shandong Military District; 1950–1954 | Succeeded by Wang Jinshan |
