= Jiangsu Provincial People's Government =

Provincial government in Jiangsu, China

Jiangsu Provincial People's Government 江苏省人民政府
- Established: November 1, 1927

Leadership
- Governor: Liu Xiaotao since October 2025
- Executive Deputy Governor: Ma Xin
- Deputy Governors: Xia Xinmin, Fang Wei, Zhao Yan, Chen Zhongwei, Li Zhongjun
- Parent body: Central People's Government; Jiangsu Provincial People's Congress
- Elected by: Jiangsu Provincial People's Congress

Website
- www.js.gov.cn

The People's Government of Jiangsu Province (Chinese: 江苏省人民政府), or Jiangsu Province People's Government (Chinese: 江苏省政府), is the provincial-level state administrative organ of Jiangsu Province, People's Republic of China.

== History ==
The Jiangsu Provincial Government was established on November 1, 1927 by the Nationalist government of the Republic of China. Near the end of the Chinese Civil War, the provincial government was evacuated to Shengsi County, in Zhejiang Province before de facto dissolving itself in May 1950.

On November 15, 1952, the Nineteenth Meeting of the Central People's Government Committee ratified the Resolution about the Reorganization of Provinces and Districts (Chinese: 《关于调整省、区建制的决议》). Article 3 of the resolution mandated the creation of the People's Government of Jiangsu Province and the dissolution of the People's Administrative Offices of North and South Jiangsu. At that time, territories that belonging to Shandong Province and Anhui Province, previously under the control of Jiangsu Province, were returned to Jiangsu. The People's Government of Jiangsu Province was founded in Nanjing. The two administrative offices and the jurisdiction of the Nanjing municipality formed the new Jiangsu Province. During this meeting, Tan Zhenlin was designated as the chairman of the People's Government of Jiangsu Province, while Ke Qingshi, Guan Wenwei, and Leng Yu were appointed as vice-chairmen. Additionally, Shi Ximin, Shi Ruifen, and forty-five others were named as members, initiating the preparations for the establishment of the People's Government of Jiangsu Province.

On January 1, 1953, the Jiangsu Provincial People's Government Committee convened its inaugural meeting. During the meeting, Tan Zhenlin declared the official formation of the People's Government of Jiangsu Province. In February 1955, the People's Government of Jiangsu Province was restructured into the People's Committee of Jiangsu Province, and in March 1968, it was transformed into the Jiangsu Province Revolutionary Committee. In December 1979, the Revolutionary Committee was dissolved, and the People's Government of Jiangsu Province was reinstated, located at 68 Beijing West Road, Gulou District, Nanjing City.

== Departments and institutions ==
As to the "Jiangsu Provincial Institutional Reform Program," alongside the General Office of the Jiangsu Provincial People's Government, the Jiangsu Provincial People's Government possesses:

- General Office
- Jiangsu Provincial Development and Reform Commission
- Jiangsu Provincial Education Department
- Jiangsu Province Provincial Department of Science and Technology
- Jiangsu Provincial Department of Industry and Information Technology
- Jiangsu Provincial Commission for Ethnic and Religious Affairs
- Jiangsu Provincial Bureau of Public Security
- Jiangsu Province Department of Civil Affairs
- Jiangsu Provincial Justice Department
- Jiangsu Provincial Finance Department
- Jiangsu Province Department of Human Resources and Social Security
- Jiangsu Province Department of Natural Resources
- Jiangsu Province Department of Ecological Environment
- Jiangsu Province Department of Housing and Urban-Rural Development
- Jiangsu Provincial Department of Transportation
- Jiangsu Provincial Department of Water Resources
- Jiangsu Provincial Department of Agriculture and Rural Development
- Jiangsu Provincial Department of Commerce
- Jiangsu Province Provincial Department of Culture and Tourism
- Jiangsu Provincial Health Authority
- Jiangsu Provincial Veterans Affairs Department
- Jiangsu Emergency Management Office
- Jiangsu Province Foreign Affairs Office
