= Tan Zhenlin =

Chinese politician (1902–1983)

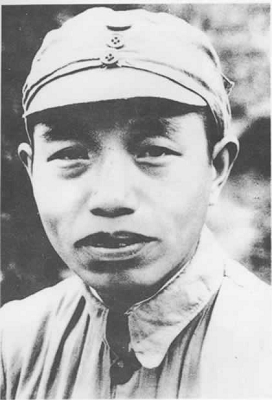
- Tan Zhenlin during the New Fourth Army period
- Native name: 谭震林
- Nicknames: Mei Cheng (梅城); "Tan Boss"
- Born: 24 April 1902; You County, Hunan, Qing China
- Died: 30 September 1983 (aged 81) Beijing, China
- Allegiance: Chinese Communist Party
- Branch: Chinese Workers' and Peasants' Red Army; National Revolutionary Army (New Fourth Army); People's Liberation Army
- Service years: 1927–1954
- Conflicts: First Chinese Civil War; Second Sino-Japanese War; Second Chinese Civil War
- Other work: Communist Party official, Politician

Tan Zhenlin (simplified Chinese: 谭震林; traditional Chinese: 譚震林; pinyin: Tán Zhènlín; 24 April 1902 – 30 September 1983), also known by his courtesy name Mei Cheng, was a revolutionary of the Chinese Communist Party and a senior general of the People's Liberation Army. He was widely known by the nickname "Tan Boss."

== Biography ==
=== Early Red Army Career ===
Tan was born on April 24, 1902, in Chengguan Town of You County, Hunan. He received a traditional private-school education and worked as an apprentice in a stationery shop during his early years. In the early 1920s, he helped organize two workers' struggles in You County and Chaling County, and in 1926 he joined the Chinese Communist Party. He served as the head of a workers' patrol, as a propaganda officer for the county trade union, and as a special emissary for the party's mass movement among workers and peasants. He organized local support for the Northern Expedition of the National Revolutionary Army and mobilized peasants to disarm reactionary forces.

In the winter of 1927, when the revolutionary forces captured Chaling, Tan was elected chairman of the Chaling Workers' and Peasants' Government and served as union chairman. Later that year, he accompanied the troops during their withdrawal and, under the leadership of Mao Zedong, participated in establishing the Jinggangshan base. He was later elected a standing committee member, then secretary and eventually party chief of the Xiang–Gan Border Special Committee, and served as the Minister of Land Reform in the worker–peasant government. In 1929, he marched with the unit into southern Jiangxi and western Fujian, holding posts such as political commissar of the 2nd Column of the Red Fourth Army and director of the political department of its 4th Column. He also participated in the Gutian Conference where he was elected to the front committee.

During the early phase of the Red Army's formation, Tan Zhenlin played an indispensable role in reorganizing and consolidating local peasant militias into a unified fighting force. He mobilized regional units effectively and established crucial defense positions in rural strongholds. These strategic measures not only secured the logistic supply lines for the main forces but also laid a solid foundation for subsequent military campaigns. His efforts significantly enhanced the overall combat readiness and organizational strength of the emerging revolutionary army.

In June 1930, Tan Zhenlin was appointed Political Commissar of the battle at Red 12th Army. He took part in early anti-encirclement campaigns in Fujian. He was involved in the Gutian Conference period reforms. In 1932, he became the commander of the Fujian Military Region, participating in the first to fourth counter-campaigns against the Nationalist encirclement of Communist bases. Under his leadership, Communist forces achieved victories in battles such as Shuixidu, Shanghang, and Mafu. In 1933, Tan was harshly criticized and removed from his post as commander of the Fujian Military Region for opposing the denunciation of the so-called "Luo Ming Line."

After the Red Army began the Long March in 1934, Tan stayed behind in the Jiangxi Soviet area. He served as Director of the Political Security Bureau of the Central Military Region (the rear guard unit), reporting directly to the Central Revolutionary Military Commission. He was also a member of the Central Sub-Bureau of the Soviet Area, leading the guerrilla resistance in southwestern Fujian for three years. During this time, influenced by the excesses of internal purges, Tan, together with Xiang Ying, was involved in the execution—by machete—of Lin Ye, former Chief of Staff of the Red 12th Army, and his wife, on charges later deemed fabricated. In 1945, the Chinese Communist Party posthumously exonerated Lin and recognized him as a revolutionary martyr.

In 1935, Tan was appointed Minister of Military Affairs of the Southwestern Fujian Army Committee, and in 1936, he became Vice Chairman of the same committee.

=== During the War of Resistance Against Japan ===
After the outbreak of the Second Sino-Japanese War, Tan's unit—part of the New Fourth Army—was reorganized. On March 1, 1938, he, together with officers such as Zhang Dingcheng and Deng Zihui, helped transform the southern Fujian Red Army into the Second Detachment of the New Fourth Army and served as its deputy commander as the unit moved north. Soon after, he was transferred to be deputy commander of the Third Detachment, where he led his troops in the battle at Majiayuan and helped establish an anti-Japanese base in southern Anhui. In 1939, Tan commanded the defense in the Battle of Fanchang, and in 1940 he was appointed commander and political commissar of the Jiangnan Anti-Japanese Volunteer Army, establishing guerrilla bases along the eastern route.

Following the New Fourth Army incident, he became commander and political commissar of the 6th Division of the New Fourth Army and Party Secretary of the South Jiangsu District – leading over 80 offensive operations against the Japanese. In November 1941, when the Japanese launched a "scorched-earth" campaign (known as "qingxiang"), Tan led the 6th Division headquarters and the 18th Brigade northward into the regions of Jiangdu, Baoying, and Gaoyou. After his 16th Brigade was ambushed, he returned to South Jiangsu to assume command of the brigade and reorganize the unit. In March 1942, Tan was appointed political commissar of the First Division of the New Fourth Army as well as the political commissar of the Central Jiangsu Military Region; in October he became Director of the Political Department of the New Fourth Army. In February 1943, he was appointed political commissar of the Second Division and the Huainan Military Region, and together with Luo Binghui led the Huainan New Fourth Army to counter Japanese sweep operations and expand their base area. In 1945, he was elected a member of the 7th Central Committee of the Chinese Communist Party.

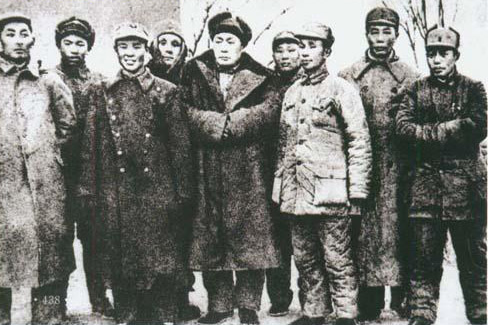
A group photo of leaders of the East China Field Army of China in 1947. From left: Ye Fei, Ding Qiusheng, Wei Guoqing, Deng Zihui, Chen Yi, Tang Liang, Su Yu, Chen Shigui, and Tan Zhenlin.

=== During the Chinese Civil War ===
After the end of the war with Japan, the Communists adjusted their strategy and the main force of the New Fourth Army entered Shandong. In November 1945, the Huazhong Branch was officially established with Tan serving as its deputy secretary; meanwhile, the remaining New Fourth Army in Huazhong was merged into the Huazhong Military Region, with Tan appointed as its deputy political commissar and the political commissar of the Huazhong Field Army.

When the second phase of the Chinese Civil War broke out, Tan, together with Su Yu, led the Central Jiangsu Campaign – achieving seven victories in seven battles. In September 1946, Su Yu's Huazhong Field Army and Chen Yi's Shandong Field Army were merged to form the East China Field Army, with Tan appointed deputy political commissar. To further open up the northern Huai region, Chen Yi and Su Yu launched a large-scale campaign. Tan also participated in the battles in northern Jiangsu (the Su–Jian Campaign) and the Shunan Campaign before moving into operations in Shandong. In January 1947, after the East China Liberation Army was reorganized, Tan served as the deputy political commissar of the East China Military Region and the East China Field Army (code-named "503"), and took part in battles at Laiwu and Menglianggu.

In August 1947, while Chen Yi and Su Yu led eight columns of the East China Field Army to attack regions in Henan, Anhui, and Jiangsu, the remaining 2nd, 7th, 9th, and 13th columns—under the command of Tan and Xu Shiyou—formed the Eastern Front Army. During the Nationalist Jiaodong Campaign, as Nationalist forces captured key cities such as Laiyang, Longkou, and Yantai, Tan commanded the 2nd and 7th columns from Zhucheng northwards and, in cooperation with Xu Shiyou, defeated Fan Hanjie's unit in the Jiaohe Campaign. He then launched successive blocking operations and recaptured Gaomi, Haiyang, and Pingdu. In December 1947, the Eastern Front Army advanced north and besieged Laiyang.

In March 1948, Tan was appointed political commissar of the Shandong Army of the East China Field Army. His force advanced westward, capturing Zhoucun and Zhangdian, and broke through the Nationalist defensive line along the Jiaoji Railway. After a sudden retreat and counterattack, his troops captured Weixian, linking the liberated areas of Jiaodong, Bohai, and Shunan. The force then pressed toward the Jinpu Railway; in May, they captured Tai'an and various Nationalist-held positions along the railway, approaching Yanzhou. In July, Tan launched the Yanzhou Campaign, capturing Yanzhou on the 13th – during which the commander of the Tenth Pacification District, Li Yutang, disguised himself to escape while the commander of the Nationalist 12th Army, Huo Shouyi, was captured. Additionally, a 9th column was dispatched to block reinforcements from Jinan.

In August 1948, the West Column of the East China Field Army reached Shandong and rejoined with the Shandong Army, and they jointly decided to attack Jinan. Xu Shiyou and Tan led an assault force of 140,000 troops, while another 180,000 under Su Yu were tasked with blocking reinforcements. On September 16, the siege of Jinan began; due to a change in orders by the East Group commander Nie Fengzhi to "attack as the main effort," Nationalist commander Wang Yaowu was unable to determine the main direction of the assault. On September 24, the People's Liberation Army captured Jinan, with the entire garrison of 110,000 either killed or forced to surrender, and Wang Yaowu was captured. In November, Tan served as a member of the General Front Committee for the Huaihai Campaign, participating in its organization and command and leading the Shandong Army in the Nianzhuang Campaign. In February 1949, he was appointed First Deputy Political Commissar of the Third Field Army. On April 21, during the Yangtze River Crossing campaign, Tan commanded the 7th and 9th Armies as part of the central force to force a crossing at Guangde, encircling over 100,000 Nationalist troops; his forces then advanced into Zhejiang. In May, after the PLA captured most of Zhejiang, Tan was appointed Communist Party Secretary of Zhejiang, Chairman of the Zhejiang Provincial Government, and Political Commissar of the Zhejiang Military Region.

=== After the Founding of the People's Republic of China ===
After the establishment of the People's Republic of China in 1949, Tan Zhenlin concurrently served as Deputy Political Commissar of the Huadong Military Region and the Third Field Army. From 1952 onward, he held posts including Third Secretary of the Huadong Bureau of the CCP, Vice Chairman of the Huadong Military-Political Committee, and Chairman of the Jiangsu Province People's Government. After December 1954, he was appointed Deputy Secretary-General of the CCP Central Committee and Vice Premier of the State Council. Although his military contributions were outstanding, he was not awarded a formal military rank because he transferred to local work relatively early. At the 8th National Congress of the Chinese Communist Party in 1956, Tan was elected to the CCP Central Committee Secretariat. At the 5th Plenary Session of the 8th Central Committee in 1958, he was additionally elected a member of the Politburo. During the Great Leap Forward, he served as the Central Secretariat official in charge of agriculture, actively propagating unrealistic slogans – such as "The bolder a person is, the more the land can produce" (a phrase first quoted in an article in People's Daily) – for which he later expressed deep remorse.

== Cultural Revolution and rehabilitation ==
During the Cultural Revolution, Tan was severely attacked and persecuted, clashing with Jiang Qing, Chen Boda, and the Lin Biao clique. At a Central Politburo meeting in February 1967, he led a session at Huairen Hall and, together with Li Fuchun, Li Xiannian, Ye Jianying, Chen Yi, Xu Xiangqian, and Nie Rongzhen, engaged in heated debate with members of the Central Cultural Revolution Group including Chen Boda, Jiang Qing, Kang Sheng, and Zhang Chunqiao. This incident later became known as the "February Countercurrent." As the meeting drew to a close, an angry Tan reportedly said, "Had I known it would come to this, I should never have joined the revolution, should never have joined the Party, should never have lived to be 65, and should never have revolted with Chairman Mao for 40 years!" Mao Zedong retorted, "If you think you should not have joined the Party so early, or lived to be 65, or revolted with me, then you could quit the Party and not join the revolution. As for whether you should live to be 65, what can be done? You have already lived!" In the aftermath, he was denounced as a "bourgeois restorationist", and thousands of Red Guards held rallies in Beijing and other cities with slogans such as "Down with Tan Zhenlin!" By mid-1967, Mao Zedong had stepped back from the most radical aspects of the campaign. In April, the Party issued orders forbidding arbitrary arrests and called for the release and rehabilitation of anyone who had been wrongly attacked. Over time, Tan's status improved. After Lin Biao's downfall in 1971, Mao showed leniency toward members of the "February Countercurrent." In 1973, following Mao's instructions, Tan was restored to full party and state leaders and was elected to the 10th National Congress of the Chinese Communist Party as a Central Committee member. In January 1975, he was elected Vice Chairman of the Standing Committee of the National People's Congress and was re-elected for one term. In 1978, Tan supported and helped promote the "1978 Truth Criterion Controversy." At the time of his death in 1983, he also served as Vice Chairman of the CCP Central Advisory Commission.

== Legacy ==
Tan Zhenlin is remembered as a veteran revolutionary and senior statesman who played a major role in the Chinese Communist Party's land and agricultural policies. In the 1950s, he led land reform campaigns in East China and took charge of major agricultural infrastructure projects, including water conservation efforts on the Huai River. His work is credited with contributing to the development of China's rural economy. Official accounts often praise him as a loyal party member and revolutionary contributor. His long political career — including positions in the Politburo, as Vice Premier, and in the National People's Congress — reflects the high esteem in which he was held by the party leadership.

== Personal life ==
Tan Zhenlin was born in You County, Hunan Province, into a modest family. His father worked as a mine clerk, and Tan received only limited formal education in a traditional private school. He joined the Communist Party in 1926 and became a veteran of the Chinese Red Army, serving throughout the civil war and the Second Sino-Japanese War. He was married twice; his second wife, Ge Huimin (born Tian Bingxiu), married him in 1939. He had at least two children — a daughter, Tan Jingyuan, and a son, Tan Xiaoguang — both of whom later served in government or scientific institutions. Details of his private life remain relatively sparse in English-language sources.

Tan Zhenlin died in Beijing on September 30, 1983, at the age of 81.

== Works ==
- Red Flag Leapt Across Ting River (Memoirs of Revolutionary Commanders), by Tan Zhenlin, Zhang Dingcheng, et al., 1981, People's Publishing House.
- Collected Works in Memory of Tan Zhenlin, 2002, Hunan People's Publishing House – a collection divided into five sections: inscriptions, photographs, selected writings, recollections, and biography.
- Centennial Commemorative Collection of Tan Zhenlin's Birth, 2002, Zhejiang People's Publishing House – featuring speeches, articles, and poems from various periods of his life that reflect his thoughts on politics, military affairs, economics, and culture.

== Family ==
Tan Zhenlin was married twice. His first wife, Jiang Xiuxian, whom he married during the Red Army period, died a few months later during political purges. His second wife, Ge Huimin (born Tian Bingxiu in 1919), married Tan in June 1939. After the establishment of the People's Republic of China, she served as a confidential secretary for both the Zhejiang Provincial Committee and the Huadong Bureau's Enterprise Work Committee as well as in Tan's office at the Central Office; she died on January 31, 1994, in Beijing.

Tan had one son and one daughter. His daughter, Tan Jingyuan, once served as the director of the Comprehensive Planning Bureau (Ministry of Finance) of the China Association for Science and Technology and retired in 2000. His son, Tan Xiaoguang, is a researcher at the Beijing Urban Meteorological Research Institute of the China Meteorological Administration.

== Political Offices ==
Below is a summary table of several key offices held by Tan Zhenlin (data translated from the Chinese page):

Office	Term	Notes / Superior	Predecessor
Vice Chairman of the Standing Committee of the National People's Congress	1975–1983	Served under Chairman(s): Zhu De, acting Song Qingling, and Ye Jianying	
Vice Premier of the State Council	1959–1975	Under Premier: Zhou Enlai	
Secretary of the Secretariat of the Chinese Communist Party(8th Congress)	1956–1966	Under General Secretary: Deng Xiaoping	
Party Secretary of Zhejiang Provincial Committee of the Chinese Communist Party	May 1949–September 1952	Liu Ying (served until 1942)	Tan Qilong
