= List of members of the 11th National People's Congress =

This is a list of members of the 11th National People's Congress.

== Constituency ==
=== Beijing === (62 seats)
Name	Chinese name	Gender	Ethnic
Yu Junbo	于均波	Male	Han
Ma Wenpu	马文普	Male	Han
Ma Zonglin	马宗林	Male	Han
Wang Xiaoke	王小珂	Female	Hui
Wang Tianyou	王天佑	Male	Han
Wang Yunfeng	王云峰	Male	Han
Wang Wenjing	王文京	Male	Han
Wang Weizheng	王为政	Male	Han
Wang Wei	王伟	Male	Han
Wang Anshun	王安顺	Male	Han
Wang Rongrong	王蓉蓉	Female	Han
Mao Guifen	毛桂芬	Female	Han
Fang Xin	方新	Female	Han
Tian Xiong	田雄	Male	Han
Feng Leping	冯乐平	Female	Han
Feng Kun	冯坤	Female	Han
Ji Lin	吉林	Male	Han
Zhu Jimin	朱继民	Male	Han
Zhu Huigang	朱惠刚	Male	Han
Liu Changyu	刘长瑜	Female	Han
Liu Zhongjun	刘忠军	Male	Han
Liu Qi	刘淇	Male	Han
Liu Xincheng	刘新成	Male	Han
Yan Aoshuang	闫傲霜	Female	Han
Guan Kuoshan	关阔山	Male	Han
Chi Qiang	池强	Male	Han
Xu Zhihong	许智宏	Male	Han
Sun Anmin	孙安民	Male	Han
Mu Xinsheng	牟新生	Male	Han
Ji Baocheng	纪宝成	Male	Han
Du Deyin	杜德印	Male	Han
Li Zhijian	李志坚	Male	Han
Li Zhaoling	李昭玲	Female	Han
Li Fucheng	李福成	Male	Han
Yang De'an	杨德安	Male	Han
Xiao Jianguo	肖建国	Male	Han
Wu Bixia	吴碧霞	Female	Han
Qiu Sulun	邱苏伦	Female	Han
Song Yushui	宋鱼水	Female	Han
Song Guilun	宋贵伦	Male	Han
Zhang Gong	张工	Male	Han
Zhang Qingwei	张庆伟	Male	Han
Wu Xun	武汛	Male	Han
Lin Yifu	林毅夫	Male	Han
Ouyang Zehua	欧阳泽华	Male	Han
Tuya	图娅	Female	Mongol
Jin Shengguan	金生官	Male	Han
Meng Xuenong	孟学农	Male	Han
Zhao Jiuhe	赵久合	Male	Han
Zhao Fengshan	赵凤山	Male	Han
Liu Chuanzhi	柳传志	Male	Han
Suo Liansheng	索连生	Male	Manchu
Jia Qinglin	贾庆林	Male	Han
Gao Lipu	高丽朴	Female	Han
Guo Jinlong	郭金龙	Male	Han
Huang Guizhang	黄桂章	Male	Han
Mei Ninghua	梅宁华	Male	Han
Xie Weihe	谢维和	Male	Han
Mu Ping	慕平	Male	Han
Qi Xiaojin	漆小瑾	Female	Han
Wei Gang	魏刚	Male	Han
Wei Zhe	魏哲	Male	Han
=== Tianjin === (46 seats)
Name	Chinese name	Gender	Ethnic
Yu Rumin	于汝民	Male	Han
Yu Pei	于沛	Male	Han
Ma Jie	马杰	Female	Hui
Wang Aijian	王爱俭	Female	Han
Mao Yanjun	毛雁俊	Female	Han
Fang Ming	方明	Male	Han
Deng Zhonghan	邓中翰	Male	Han
Bao Jingling	包景岭	Male	Han
Feng Shuping	冯淑萍	Female	Han
Xing Kezhi	邢克智	Male	Han
Zhu Tianhui	朱天慧	Female	Han
Zhu Liping	朱丽萍	Female	Han
Liu Kaixin	刘凯欣	Male	Han
Liu Shengyu	刘胜玉	Male	Han
Liu Xiaojian	刘晓健	Male	Han
Yan Xijun	闫希军	Male	Han
Sun Hailin	孙海麟	Male	Han
Li Fengqin	李凤芹	Female	Han
Li Quani	李全喜	Male	Hui
Li Shuwen	李树文	Male	Han
Yang Fugang	杨福刚	Male	Han
Xiao Huaiyuan	肖怀远	Male	Han
He Zhimin	何志敏	Male	Han
He Shushan	何树山	Male	Han
Chen Jiacong	沈家聪	Male	Han
Zhang Fengbao	张凤宝	Male	Han
Zhang Youhui	张有会	Male	Han
Zhang Liping	张丽萍	Female	Mongol
Zhang Boli	张伯礼	Male	Han
Zhang Junbin	张俊滨	Male	Han
Zhang Xiaoyan	张晓燕	Female	Han
Zhang Gaoli	张高丽	Male	Han
Zhang Jiyu	张继禹	Male	Han
Zhang Zhaoyi	张肇毅	Male	Han
Gou Lijun	苟利军	Male	Han
Fang Fengyou	房凤友	Male	Han
Zhao Mei	赵玫	Female	Manchu
Rao Zihe	饶子和	Male	Han
Guo Qingping	郭庆平	Male	Manchu
Huang Xingguo	黄兴国	Male	Han
Cao Dazheng	曹大正	Male	Han
Gong Ke	龚克	Male	Han
Cheng Jinpei	程津培	Male	Han
Jin Runcheng	靳润成	Male	Han
Huo Bing	霍兵	Male	Han
Mu Xiangyou	穆祥友	Male	Hui
=== Hebei === (120 seats)
Name	Chinese name	Gender	Ethnic
Ding Wanming	丁万明	Male	Manchu
Ding Liguo	丁立国	Male	Han
Ding Ran	丁然	Female	Hui
Ding Qiang	丁强	Male	Han
Yu Qun	于群	Male	Han
Me Zhiyi	么志义	Male	Han
Wang Yifang	王义芳	Male	Han
Wang Feng	王凤	Male	Han
Wang Fengying	王凤英	Female	Han
Wang Cheng	王成	Male	Han
Wang Zhigang	王志刚	Male	Han
Wang Xiuzhen	王秀珍	Female	Han
Wang Sheping	王社平	Male	Han
Wang Xuehong	王学红	Female	Mongol
Wang Xueqiu	王学求	Male	Han
Wang Baoshan	王宝山	Male	Han
Wang Hengqin	王恒勤	Male	Han
Wang Zhenhua	王振华	Male	Han
Wang Aimin	王爱民	Male	Han
Wang Chao	王超	Male	Han
Wang Huiwen	王惠文	Male	Han
Wang Dejin	王德进	Male	Han
Ge Jianhua	戈建华	Male	Han
Fang Jianping	方建平	Male	Han
Yin Guangjun	尹广军	Male	Hui
Tian Zhiping	田志平	Male	Han
Shi Shu'e	史书娥	Female	Han
Fu Zhifang	付志方	Male	Han
Bai Keming	白克明	Male	Han
Cong Bin	丛斌	Male	Han
Bi Jianguo	毕建国	Male	Han
Zhu Zhengju	朱正举	Male	Han
Zhu Shouchen	朱守琛	Male	Han
Zhu Haowen	朱浩文	Male	Han
Liu Daqun	刘大群	Male	Han
Liu Yandong	刘延东	Female	Han
Liu Rujun	刘如军	Male	Han
Liu Zhixin	刘志新	Male	Manchu
Liu Mingzhong	刘明忠	Male	Han
Liu Xueku	刘学库	Male	Han
Liu Zhenhua	刘振华	Male	Han
Qi Xuchun	齐续春	Male	Manchu
Guan Min	关敏	Female	Manchu
Qi Wanli	祁万利	Male	Han
Xu Heying	许荷英	Female	Han
Sun Jimu	孙纪木	Male	Han
Sus Hifeng	苏士峰	Male	Han
Li Baoyuan	李宝元	Male	Han
Li Chunsheng	李春生	Male	Han
Li Zupei	李祖沛	Male	Han
Li Zhenjiang	李振江	Male	Han
Li Ganpo	李赶坡	Male	Han
Li Xiao'en	李晓恩	Male	Han
Yang Zhong	杨中	Male	Han
Yang Xiuhua	杨秀华	Female	Han
Yang Jianzhong	杨建忠	Male	Han
Yang Xuegang	杨雪岗	Male	Han
He Xiaowei	何晓卫	Male	Han
Yu Zhengui	余振贵	Male	Hui
Zou Xiaoshan	邹晓珊	Female	Han
Xin Shuhua	辛书华	Female	Han
Xin Baoshan	辛宝山	Female	Han
Wang Xiuli	汪秀丽	Female	Han
Wang Kang	汪康	Male	Han
Chen Xiaoping	沈小平	Male	Han
Song Furu	宋福如	Male	Han
Zhang Yunchuan	张云川	Male	Han
Zhang Gujiang	张古江	Male	Han
Zhang Qingwei	张庆伟	Male	Han
Zhang Qingli	张庆黎	Male	Han
Zhang Zhigang	张志刚	Male	Han
Zhang Xueqing	张学庆	Male	Han
Zhang Jianheng	张建恒	Male	Han
Zhang Junling	张俊玲	Female	Han
Chen Baicheng	陈百成	Male	Manchu
Chen Guoying	陈国鹰	Male	Han
Chen Lianqun	陈联群	Female	Han
Shao Xizhen	邵喜珍	Female	Han
Shang Jinsuo	尚金锁	Male	Han
Zhou Tienong	周铁农	Male	Han
Zheng Xuebi	郑雪碧	Male	Han
Fang Hui	房辉	Female	Han
Zhao Linming	赵林明	Male	Han
Zhao Guoling	赵国岭	Male	Han
Zhao Zhihai	赵治海	Male	Han
Zhao Baoqin	赵宝勤	Male	Han
Liu Baoquan	柳宝全	Male	Han
Liu Baocheng	柳宝诚	Male	Han
Duan Tieli	段铁力	Male	Han
Xin Chunying	信春鹰	Female	Han
Hou Erhe	侯二河	Male	Han
Jiang Deguo	姜德果	Male	Han
He Guoying	贺国英	Male	Han
Yuan Miaozhi	袁妙枝	Female	Han
Yuan Shumei	袁淑梅	Female	Han
Geng Jianming	耿建明	Male	Han
Jia Tixin	贾体新	Female	Han
Jia Chunmei	贾春梅	Female	Han
Qian Zongfei	钱宗飞	Male	Han
Gao Hongzhi	高宏志	Male	Han
Guo Chengzhi	郭成志	Male	Han
Guo Shuqin	郭淑芹	Female	Han
Huang Rong	黄荣	Male	Han
Xiao Yutian	萧玉田	Male	Han
Cao Baohua	曹宝华	Male	Han
Chang Yuzhen	常玉珍	Female	Han
Yan Shengke	阎胜科	Male	Han
Peng Xuefeng	彭雪峰	Male	Han
Han Yuchen	韩玉臣	Male	Han
Han Qingmei	韩青梅	Female	Hui
Han Ronghua	韩荣华	Female	Han
Jin Lingzhan	靳灵展	Female	Han
Jin Baofang	靳保芳	Male	Han
Zhan Furui	詹福瑞	Male	Manchu
Cai Dongchen	蔡东晨	Male	Han
Cai Dekuan	蔡德宽	Male	Han
Liao Bo	廖波	Male	Han
Pan Xiufen	潘秀芬	Female	Han
Xue Jilian	薛继连	Male	Han
Wei Zhimin	魏志民	Male	Han
=== Shanxi === (67 seats)
Name	Chinese name	Gender	Ethnic
Ma Xiaoping	马小平	Male	Hui
Ma Qiaozhen	马巧珍	Female	Han
Ma Linfeng	马林凤	Female	Han
Ma Kai	马凯	Male	Han
Feng Lixiang	丰立祥	Male	Han
Wang Ning	王宁	Male	Han
Wang Jun	王君	Male	Han
Wang Maoshe	王茂设	Male	Han
Wang Yuesheng	王跃胜	Male	Han
Wang Shuzhen	王淑珍	Female	Han
Zuo Shizhong	左世忠	Male	Han
Ye Jingliang	叶景亮	Male	Han
Shen Jilan	申纪兰	Female	Han
Shen Lianbin	申联彬	Male	Han
Shen Ruitao	申瑞涛	Female	Han
Tian Xirong	田喜荣	Male	Han
Bai Yun	白云	Female	Han
Bai Jingfu	白景富	Male	Han
Liu Ronghua	刘蓉华	Female	Han
Xu Yuegang	许月刚	Male	Han
Ji Xinfang	纪馨芳	Male	Han
Du Yulin	杜玉林	Male	Han
Du Shanxue	杜善学	Male	Han
Li Li	李力	Male	Han
Li Xiaopeng	李小鹏	Male	Han
Li Wuzhang	李武章	Male	Han
Li Qingshan	李青山	Male	Han
Li Xiaobo	李晓波	Male	Han
Li Yue'e	李悦娥	Female	Han
Li Zhanghong	李章宏	Male	Han
Yang Anhe	杨安和	Male	Han
Yang Gengyu	杨庚宇	Male	Han
Yang Shaoqing	杨绍清	Male	Han
Yang Meixi	杨梅喜	Male	Han
Wu Yongping	吴永平	Male	Han
Chen Jianjun	沈建军	Female	Han
Zhang Shaoqin	张少琴	Male	Han
Zhang Bingsheng	张兵生	Male	Han
Zhang Zhongning	张钟宁	Male	Han
Zhang Fuming	张复明	Male	Han
Zhang Genhu	张根虎	Male	Han
Zhang Jiasheng	张家胜	Male	Han
Zhang Chonghui	张崇慧	Male	Han
Zhang Pu	张璞	Male	Han
Chen Guorong	陈国荣	Male	Han
Zheng Jianguo	郑建国	Male	Han
Lang Sheng	郎胜	Male	Han
Zhao Lixin	赵立欣	Female	Han
Zhao Huashan	赵华山	Male	Han
Hu Suping	胡苏平	Female	Han
Ke Hanmin	柯汉民	Male	Han
Liu Shulin	柳树林	Male	Han
Yuan Yuzhu	袁玉珠	Male	Han
Yuan Chunqing	袁纯清	Male	Han
Geng Huaiying	耿怀英	Male	Han
Li Junping	栗俊平	Male	Han
Gao Weidong	高卫东	Male	Han
Guo Fenglian	郭凤莲	Female	Han
Guo Shuangwei	郭双威	Male	Han
Guo Xinzhi	郭新志	Female	Han
Liang Heng	梁衡	Male	Han
Dong Hongyun	董洪运	Male	Han
Dong Changsheng	董常生	Male	Han
Han Chang'an	韩长安	Male	Han
Han Yaqin	韩雅琴	Female	Han
Xie Hong	谢红	Female	Han
Xie Kechang	谢克昌	Male	Han
=== Inner Mongolia === (60 seats)
Name	Chinese name	Gender	Ethnic
Ding Ruilian	丁瑞莲	Female	Han
Wang Zhonghe	王中和	Male	Han
Wang Fengchao	王凤朝	Male	Han
Wang Yuming	王玉明	Male	Han
Wang Xiuzhi	王秀芝	Female	Mongol
Wang Linxiang	王林祥	Male	Han
Wang Suyi	王素毅	Male	Mongol
Wang Rungang	王润刚	Male	Han
Yun Xiumei	云秀梅	Female	Mongol
Yun Zhihou	云治厚	Male	Mongol
Uyunqimg	乌云其木格	Female	Mongol
Wuritu	乌日图	Male	Mongol
Ulanbagatur	乌兰巴特尔	Male	Mongol
Bagatur	巴特尔	Male	Mongol
Bai Xiangqun	白向群	Male	Mongol
Lü Qiu'e	吕秋娥	Female	Han
Ren Yaping	任亚平	Male	Han
Seyintu	色音图	Male	Ewenki
Liu Santang	刘三堂	Male	Han
Liu Fengshu	刘凤书	Female	MA
Tang Aijun	汤爱军	Male	Han
Du Zi	杜梓	Male	Han
Li Wanzhong	李万忠	Male	Han
Li Fengbin	李凤斌	Male	Han
Li Wenge	李文阁	Male	Mongol
Li Qiqige	李其其格	Female	Mongol
Li Binghe	李秉和	Male	Han
Li Rongxi	李荣禧	Male	Han
Yang Feiyun	杨飞云	Male	Han
Yang Jing	杨晶	Male	Mongol
Xiao Lisheng	肖黎声	Male	Han
Wu Jinliang	吴金亮	Male	Han
Zhang Fengxia	张凤霞	Female	Han
Hurtsa	呼尔查	Male	Mongol
Luo Zhihu	罗志虎	Male	Mongol
Meng Yuzhen	孟玉珍	Female	Oroqen
Zhao Yongqi	赵永起	Male	Han
Hao Yidong	郝益东	Male	Han
Rong Tianhou	荣天厚	Male	Mongol
Hu Chunhua	胡春华	Male	Han
Hasibagen	哈斯巴根	Male	Mongol
Hou Qingmin	侯清民	Male	Han
Lou Bojun	娄伯君	Male	Han
Jia Jianhui	贾建慧	Female	Han
Gu Shuangyan	顾双燕	Female	Han
Xu Ruixia	徐睿霞	Female	Han
Guo Lihong	郭丽虹	Female	Han
Guo Honglin	郭宏林	Male	Daur
Guo Jian	郭健	Male	Mongol
Tao Jian	陶建	Male	Han
Cui Chen	崔臣	Male	Han
Liang Tiecheng	梁铁城	Male	Mongol
Tu Hailing	屠海令	Male	Han
Chao Ke	朝克	Male	Ewenki
Chao Lumeng	朝鲁孟	Male	Mongol
Fu Tiegang	傅铁钢	Male	Han
Chu Bo	储波	Male	Han
Lei E'erdeni	雷·额尔德尼	Male	Mongol
Mou Wenmin	缪文民	Male	Han
Pan Yiyang	潘逸阳	Male	Han
=== Liaoning === (110 seats)
Name	Chinese name	Gender	Ethnic
Yu Hong	于洪	Male	Han
Wang Wanbin	王万宾	Male	Han
Wang Tianran	王天然	Male	Han
Wang Wenquan	王文权	Male	Han
Wang Zhanzhu	王占柱	Male	Mongol
Wang Yongsheng	王用生	Male	Han
Wang Shoubin	王守彬	Male	Han
Wang Yang	王阳	Male	Han
Wang Huaiyuan	王怀远	Male	Han
Wang Baojun	王宝军	Male	Han
Wang Chuncheng	王春成	Male	Han
Wang Min	王珉	Male	Han
Wang Junlian	王俊莲	Female	Han
Wang Liang	王亮	Male	Han
Wang Zuwen	王祖温	Male	Han
Wang Zhenhua	王振华	Male	Han
Wang Guirong	王桂荣	Female	Han
Wang Weizhong	王唯众	Male	Han
Wang Qiong	王琼	Male	Han
Mao Fengmei	毛丰美	Male	Manchu
Ba Furong	巴福荣	Female	Manchu
Ai Hongde	艾洪德	Male	Han
Shi Ying	石英	Female	Han
Tian Fuquan	田福泉	Male	Han
Bao Ruiling	包瑞玲	Female	Mongol
Feng Dazhong	冯大中	Male	Han
Feng Hong	冯虹	Female	Han
Gang Rui	冮瑞	Male	Manchu
Qu Baoxue	曲宝学	Male	Han
Liu Zhixu	刘芝旭	Male	Han
Liu Hua	刘华	Female	Han
Liu Xingqiang	刘兴强	Male	Han
Liu Guoqiang	刘国强	Male	Han
Liu Zhongtian	刘忠田	Male	Manchu
Yan Feng	闫丰	Male	Han
Tang Xiaoquan	汤小泉	Female	Han
Sun Zhaolin	孙兆林	Male	Han
Sun Shoukuan	孙寿宽	Male	Han
Sun Hong	孙宏	Male	Han
Sun Guoxiang	孙国相	Male	Han
Sun Du	孙度	Male	Han
Sun Shujun	孙淑君	Female	Han
Li Dongqi	李东齐	Male	Han
Li Jun	李军	Male	Mongol
Li Jindian	李进巅	Male	Han
Li Keqiang	李克强	Male	Han
Li Yingjie	李英杰	Male	Han
Li Mingke	李明克	Male	Han
Li Xiaodong	李晓东	Male	Han
Li Feng	李峰	Male	Han
Yang Min	杨敏	♀	Han
Bing Zhigang	邴志刚	Male	Han
Xiao Sheng	肖声	Male	Han
Xiao Zuofu	肖作福	Male	Manchu
He Zhesheng	何著胜	Male	Manchu
He Jing	何晶	Female	Mongol
Gu Wentao	谷文涛	Male	Han
Gu Chunli	谷春立	Male	Han
Chen Lirong	沈丽荣	Female	Han
Huai Zhongmin	怀忠民	Male	Han
Zhang Fengshan	张凤山	Male	Han
Zhang Wencheng	张文成	Male	Han
Zhang Wenyue	张文岳	Male	Han
Zhang Yukun	张玉坤	Female	Han
Zhang Zhanyu	张占宇	Male	Han
Zhang Xingxiang	张行湘	Male	Han
Zhang Xingkai	张兴凯	Male	Han
Zhang Surong	张素荣	Female	Han
Zhang Guiping	张桂平	Female	Han
Zhang Xiaogang	张晓刚	Male	Han
Zhang Tiehan	张铁汉	Male	Han
Zhang Tiemin	张铁民	Male	Han
Zhang Jingqiang	张竞强	Male	Han
Zhang Xilin	张锡林	Male	Han
Chen Bicheng	陈必成	Male	Han
Chen Zhenggao	陈政高	Male	Han
Chen Haibo	陈海波	Male	Han
Chen Huiren	陈惠仁	Male	Han
Chen Wenfu	陈温福	Male	Han
Wu Xiujun	武秀君	Female	Manchu
Ou Jinping	欧进萍	Male	Han
Jin Zhuhua	金竹花	Female	Korean
Jin Lianwu	金连武	Male	Manchu
Zheng Jiyu	郑继宇	Male	Han
Meng Lingbin	孟凌斌	Male	Manchu
Zhao Changyi	赵长义	Male	Han
Zhao Changyu	赵长愉	Male	Manchu
Zhao Liansheng	赵连生	Male	Han
Zhao Xizhong	赵喜忠	Male	Han
Wen Shizhen	闻世震	Male	Han
He Min	贺旻	Female	Han
Geng Chenghui	耿承辉	Male	Manchu
Jia Nianji	贾年吉	Male	Han
Jia Changsheng	贾常生	Male	Xibe
Xia Deren	夏德仁	Male	Han
Xu Qiang	徐强	Male	Han
Gao Jun	高军	Male	Han
Gao Baoyu	高宝玉	Male	Han
Guo Lei	郭雷	Male	Han
Tang Zhiguo	唐志国	Male	Han
Sheng Songcheng	盛松成	Male	Han
Liang Bing	梁冰	Female	Han
Han Youbo	韩有波	Male	Hui
He Jicheng	赫冀成	Male	Manchu
Pei Hongbin	裴宏斌	Male	Han
Tan Wenhua	谭文华	Male	Han
Teng Weiping	滕卫平	Male	Han
Pan Liguo	潘利国	Male	Han
Yan Fulong	燕福龙	Male	Han
Dai Yuzhong	戴玉忠	Male	Han
=== Jilin === (68 seats)
Name	Chinese name	Gender	Ethnic
Yu Zhenfa	于振发	Male	Han
Wang Yunkun	王云坤	Male	Han
Wang Huawen	王化文	Male	Han
Wang Yuzhi	王玉芝	Female	Han
Wang Gang	王刚	Male	Han
Wang Jiangbin	王江滨	Female	Han
Wang Hongjun	王洪军	Male	Han
Wang Rulin	王儒林	Male	Han
Che Xiulan	车秀兰	Female	Han
Shi Guoxiang	石国祥	Male	Hui
Lu Zhimin	卢志民	Male	Han
Shi Ningzhong	史宁中	Male	Han
Cong Lianbiao	丛连彪	Male	Hui
Liu Chunmei	刘春梅	Female	Han
Liu Yongbing	刘勇兵	Male	Han
Liu Xijie	刘喜杰	Male	Han
Guan Dewei	关德伟	Female	Han
Jiang Lianhai	江连海	Male	Han
An Fengcheng	安凤成	Male	Han
Sun Guowei	孙国伟	Male	Han
Sun Zhengcai	孙政才	Male	Han
Sun Hongzhi	孙鸿志	Male	Han
Sun Hejuan	孙鹤娟	Female	Han
Du Jie	杜婕	Female	Han
Li Longxi	李龙熙	Male	Korean
Li Xiulin	李秀林	Male	Han
Li Yanqun	李彦群	Male	Han
Li Fusheng	李福升	Male	Han
Yang Yang	杨扬	Female	Han
Yang Yajie	杨亚杰	Male	Han
Wu Yue	吴跃	Male	Han
Bie Shengxue	别胜学	Male	Han
Song Shanglong	宋尚龙	Male	Han
Song Zhiping	宋治平	Female	Han
Zhang Wenxian	张文显	Male	Han
Zhang Anshun	张安顺	Male	Han
Zhang Jinsuo	张金锁	Male	Han
Zhang Bolin	张柏林	Male	Han
Zhang Binggong	张炳功	Male	Han
Zhang Xiaopei	张晓霈	Male	Han
Zhang Xianchong	张羡崇	Male	Han
Chen Mingle	陈明乐	Male	Tibetan
Chen Xiaoguang	陈晓光	Male	Han
Wu Yin	武寅	Female	Han
Huheshaobu	呼和少布	Male	Mongol
Zhu Yanfeng	竺延风	Male	Han
Yue Derong	岳德荣	Male	Han
Jin Bingmin	金柄珉	Male	Korean
Jin Shuoren	金硕仁	Male	Korean
Zhou Qifeng	周其凤	Male	Han
Zhou Chunlian	周春莲	Female	Han
Hao Fuxia	郝富霞	Female	Han
Bai Guangxin	柏广新	Male	Han
Xian Shunnü	咸顺女	Female	Korean
Hou Qijun	侯启军	Male	Han
Hong Hu	洪虎	Male	Han
Zhu Yejing	祝业精	Male	Han
Nie Wenquan	聂文权	Male	Han
Xu Yuanzheng	徐远征	Male	Manchu
Xu Jianyi	徐建一	Male	Han
Guo Guoqing	郭国庆	Male	Han
Tang Zhiping	唐志萍	Female	Han
Tang Xianqiang	唐宪强	Male	Han
Huang Yanming	黄燕明	Male	Han
Gong Ling	龚玲	Female	Han
Cui Jinshun	崔今顺	Female	Korean
Cui Jie	崔杰	Male	Han
Han Changfu	韩长赋	Male	Han
=== Heilongjiang === (103 seats)
Name	Chinese name	Gender	Ethnic
Ma Guiqin	马桂芹	Female	Han
Ma Shujie	马淑洁	Female	Han
Wang Donghua	王东华	Male	Han
Wang Zhaoli	王兆力	Male	Han
Wang Zuoshu	王佐书	Male	Han
Wang Xin	王欣	Male	Han
Wang Bo	王波	Female	Han
Wang Baoliang	王宝良	Male	Han
Wang Zongzhang	王宗璋	Male	Han
Wang Shuguo	王树国	Male	Han
Wang Honglie	王洪烈	Male	Han
Wang Xiankui	王宪魁	Male	Han
Wang Yanbin	王艳斌	Female	Han
Wang Diangui	王殿贵	Male	Han
You Quanxi	尤全喜	Male	Han
Fang Tonghua	方同华	Male	Han
Shi Zhongxin	石忠信	Male	Hui
Shi Jiaxing	石嘉兴	Male	Manchu
Long Xinnan	龙新南	Male	Han
Feng Yan	冯燕	Female	Han
Ji Bingxuan	吉炳轩	Male	Han
Pu Guangzhong	朴广钟	Male	Korean
Zhu Qingwen	朱清文	Male	Han
Liu Shiying	刘世英	Male	Hui
Liu Donghui	刘东辉	Male	Han
Liu Gang	刘刚	Male	Hui
Liu Qingquan	刘清泉	Male	Han
Liu Lei	刘蕾	Female	Hezhen
Guan Yanbin	关彦斌	Male	Manchu
An Fuqing	安福清	Male	Han
Xu Zhaojun	许兆君	Male	Han
Na Hui	那辉	Female	Manchu
Sun Guihua	孙桂华	Female	Han
Sun Guiling	孙桂玲	Female	Han
Sun Weiben	孙维本	Male	Han
Sun Puxuan	孙普选	Male	Han
Su Yanxia	苏艳霞	Female	Han
Du Jiming	杜吉明	Male	Han
Du Shanyi	杜善义	Male	Han
Li Bengong	李本公	Male	Han
Li Hua	李华	Female	Han
Li Qingchang	李庆长	Male	Han
Li Zhongjun	李忠军	Male	Han
Li Meilan	李美兰	Female	Korean
Li Haitao	李海涛	Male	Han
Li Jichun	李继纯	Male	Han
Li Shuxiang	李淑香	Female	Han
Li Xinmin	李新民	Male	Han
Yang Tianfu	杨天夫	Male	Han
Yang Guanghong	杨光洪	Male	Han
Yang Jigang	杨继钢	Male	Han
Yang Bin	杨斌	Male	Han
Wu Qingyan	吴庆沿	Male	Han
Song Xibin	宋希斌	Male	Han
Song Fatang	宋法棠	Male	Han
Song Xiude	宋修德	Male	Han
Chi Susheng	迟夙生	Female	Han
Zhang Chengyi	张成义	Male	Han
Zhang Yang	张泱	Male	Han
Zhang Shaoji	张绍骥	Male	Han
Zhang Yanqi	张彦启	Male	Han
Zhang Hongbiao	张洪飚	Male	Han
Zhang Xianjun	张宪军	Male	Han
Zhang Xiaolian	张效廉	Male	Han
Zhang Yaying	张雅英	Female	Han
Zhang Jingchuan	张晶川	Male	Han
Chen Shutao	陈述涛	Male	Manchu
Chen Hesheng	陈和生	Male	Han
Chen Xueping	陈学平	Male	Manchu
Chen Chenggui	陈承贵	Male	Han
Lin Xiufang	林秀芳	Female	Manchu
Shang Qinglian	尚庆莲	Female	Han
Luo Wenxiao	罗文孝	Male	Han
Yue Guojun	岳国君	Male	Han
Zhou Yuhuan	周玉环	Female	Han
Zhou Yongkang	周永康	Male	Han
Zhou Youcai	周有财	Male	Han
Zhou Tongzhan	周同战	Male	Han
Zhou Fengmin	周逢民	Male	Han
Zheng Gongcheng	郑功成	Male	Han
Dan Zengqing	单增庆	Male	Han
Zhao Zhixiang	赵志祥	Male	Han
Nan Ying	南英	Male	Han
Jiang Wei	姜伟	Male	Han
Jiang Linkui	姜林奎	Male	Han
Jiang Hongbin	姜鸿斌	Male	Han
Naren Hua	娜仁花	Female	Mongol
Qian Yunlu	钱运录	Male	Han
Xu Xiuyu	徐秀玉	Female	Han
Xu Zhenlin	徐振林	Male	Han
Xu Weizhong	徐维众	Male	Han
Yin Xiumei	殷秀梅	Female	Han
Gao Xiang	高翔	Male	Han
Tang Xiuting	唐修亭	Male	Han
Zhan Yunting	展云庭	Male	Han
Cao Shujie	曹书杰	Female	Han
Cui Longji	崔龙吉	Male	Korean
Zhang Baijia	章百家	Male	Han
Sui Fengfu	隋凤富	Male	Han
Sui Ximing	隋熙明	Male	Han
Han Xuejian	韩学键	Male	Han
Tan Zhijuan	谭志娟	Female	Han
Teng Xikui	滕喜魁	Male	Han
=== Shanghai === (65 seats)
Name	Chinese name	Gender	Ethnic
Xi Jinping	习近平	Male	Han
Ma Lan	马兰	Female	Han
Ma Dexiu	马德秀	Female	Han
Wang Ronghua	王荣华	Male	Han
Wang Zhan	王战	Male	Han
Wang Enduo	王恩多	Female	Han
Wang Xia	王霞	Female	Mongol
Ye Qian	叶倩	Female	Han
Ye Huixian	叶惠贤	Male	Han
Rong Guangdao	戎光道	Male	Han
Lü Yachen	吕亚臣	Male	Han
Zhu Yuchen	朱玉辰	Male	Manchu
Zhu Zhiyuan	朱志远	Male	Han
Zhu Guoping	朱国萍	Female	Han
Zhu Xueqin	朱雪芹	Female	Han
Liu Yungeng	刘云耕	Male	Han
Liu Shaoyong	刘绍勇	Male	Han
Liu Hongkai	刘洪凯	Male	Han
Sun Yibiao	孙毅彪	Male	Han
Yan Chengzhong	严诚忠	Male	Han
Yan Junqi	严隽琪	Female	Han
Du Bin	杜斌	Male	Han
Li Yiping	李逸平	Male	Han
Li Bin	李斌	Male	Han
Wu Qi	吴齐	Male	Han
Wu Qidi	吴启迪	Female	Han
Wu Zhongze	吴忠泽	Male	Han
Wu Qiang	吴强	Male	Han
Ying Minghong	应名洪	Male	Han
Ying Yong	应勇	Male	Han
Chen Zhigang	沈志刚	Male	Han
Zhang Quan	张全	Male	Han
Zhang Zhao'an	张兆安	Male	Han
Zhang Zheren	张喆人	Male	Han
Chen Xuyuan	陈戌源	Male	Han
Chen Weilan	陈伟兰	Female	Han
Chen Xu	陈旭	Male	Han
Chen Hong	陈虹	Male	Han
Chen Zhenlou	陈振楼	Male	Han
Chen Saijuan	陈赛娟	Female	Han
Shao Zhiqing	邵志清	Male	Han
Lin Yinmao	林荫茂	Female	Han
Jin Changrong	金长荣	Male	Hui
Jin Xingming	金兴明	Male	Han
Jin Jianzhong	金建忠	Male	Han
Jin Binghua	金炳华	Male	Han
Zhou Hongling	周红玲	Female	Han
Hu Pingxi	胡平西	Male	Han
Yu Zhengsheng	俞正声	Male	Han
Hong Hao	洪浩	Male	Han
Yao Mingbao	姚明宝	Male	Han
Yao Li	姚莉	Female	Han
Qin Shaode	秦绍德	Male	Han
Jia Weiping	贾伟平	Female	Han
Gu Jin	顾晋	Male	Han
Gu Yidong	顾逸东	Male	Han
Xu Zheng	徐征	Male	Han
Xi Meijuan	奚美娟	Female	Han
Guo Guangchang	郭广昌	Male	Han
Huang Yuejin	黄跃金	Male	Han
Gong Xueping	龚学平	Male	Han
Sheng Yafei	盛亚飞	Male	Han
Han Zheng	韩正	Male	Han
Chu Junhao	褚君浩	Male	Han
Fan Yun	樊芸	Female	Han
=== Jiangsu === (160 seats)
Name	Chinese name	Gender	Ethnic
Ding Dawei	丁大卫	Male	Han
Ma Chengzhi	马成志	Male	Han
Wang Guangji	王广基	Male	Han
Wang Longfang	王龙芳	Female	Han
Wang Sheng	王生	Male	Han
Wang Weicheng	王伟成	Male	Han
Wang Shouting	王寿亭	Male	Han
Wang Fang	王芳	Female	Han
Wang Wu	王武	Female	Han
Wang Haoliang	王浩良	Male	Han
Wang Jingcheng	王静成	Male	Han
Wang Yanwen	王燕文	Female	Han
Mao Xiaoping	毛小平	Male	Han
Mao Weiming	毛伟明	Male	Han
Qiu Zhongwen	仇中文	Male	Han
Gong Pixiang	公丕祥	Male	Han
Fang Yixin	方宜新	Male	Han
Yin Guoxin	尹国新	Male	Han
Zuo Hong	左红	Female	Han
Shi Taifeng	石泰峰	Male	Han
Lu Kesong	卢克松	Male	Han
Ye Youwei	叶有伟	Male	Han
Shen Xiangqin	申湘琴	Female	Han
Lü Zhenlin	吕振霖	Male	Han
Zhu Ping	朱平	Male	Han
Zhu Yongxin	朱永新	Male	Han
Zhu Guoping	朱国平	Male	Han
Zhu Shanping	朱善萍	Female	Han
Qiao Xiaoyang	乔晓阳	Male	Han
Liu Yongzhong	刘永忠	Male	Han
Liu Qingnian	刘庆年	Male	Han
Liu Litao	刘丽涛	Female	Han
Liu Chenlin	刘沈林	Male	Han
Liu Ling	刘玲	Female	Han
Liu Jinlan	刘锦兰	Male	Han
Liu Fan	刘璠	Male	Han
Yan Lijuan	闫丽娟	Female	Han
Xu Jinrong	许津荣	Female	Han
Sun Gongsheng	孙工声	Male	Han
Sun Yuyi	孙玉义	Male	Han
Sun Xiufang	孙秀芳	Female	Han
Sun Qixin	孙其信	Male	Han
Sun Guoqing	孙国庆	Female	Han
Sun Piaoyang	孙飘扬	Male	Han
Du Guoling	杜国玲	Female	Han
Li Yunfeng	李云峰	Male	Han
Li Quanlin	李全林	Male	Han
Li Xueyong	李学勇	Male	Han
Li Qiang	李强	Male	Han
Li Yuanchao	李源潮	Male	Han
Yang Zhanli	杨展里	Male	Han
Yang Xinli	杨新力	Male	Han
Yang Qun	杨群	Male	Han
Yang Zhen	杨震	Male	Han
Xiao Wei	肖伟	Male	Han
Wu Guoping	吴国平	Male	Han
Wu Xiaobei	吴晓蓓	Female	Han
He Daping	何达平	Male	Han
He Jianzhong	何健忠	Male	Han
Yu Shiyuan	余世袁	Male	Han
Zou Jianping	邹建平	Male	Han
Wang Chunyun	汪春耘	Female	Han
Sha Jiahao	沙家豪	Male	Hui
Shen Jinjin	沈进进	Male	Han
Shen Jian	沈健	Male	Han
Song Yulan	宋玉兰	Female	Han
Song Yulin	宋玉麟	Male	Han
Zhang Dafu	张大福	Male	Han
Zhang Weiguo	张卫国	Male	Han
Zhang Hong	张红	Female	Han
Zhang Guoliang	张国良	Male	Han
Zhang Bin	张斌	Male	Han
Zhang Xiangning	张湘宁	Male	Han
Lu Yaping	陆亚萍	Female	Han
Lu Qin	陆琴	Female	Han
Chen Lichang	陈立昶	Male	Han
Chen Xianyan	陈先岩	Male	Han
Chen Honghong	陈红红	Female	Han
Chen Lifen	陈丽芬	Female	Han
Chen Xiulan	陈秀兰	Female	Han
Chen Zongqi	陈宗器	Male	Han
Chen Jiabao	陈家宝	Male	Han
Chen Jun	陈骏	Male	Han
Chen Ping	陈萍	Female	Han
Chen Jingyi	陈静怡	Female	Han
Chen Jingyu	陈静瑜	Male	Han
Chen Zhenning	陈震宁	Male	Han
Chen Yanping	陈燕萍	Female	Han
Chen Xin	陈鑫	Male	Han
Shao Yong	邵勇	Male	Han
Shao Min	邵敏	Female	Han
Wu Jijun	武继军	Male	Han
Miao Yi	苗毅	Male	Han
Lin Xiangguo	林祥国	Male	Han
Yi Hong	易红	Male	Han
Yi Xin	易昕	Male	Han
Luo Zhijun	罗志军	Male	Han
Zhou Wenzhou	周文舟	Male	Han
Zhou Li	周莉	Female	Han
Zhou Yinmei	周银妹	Female	Han
Zheng Ya	郑亚	Male	Han
Zheng Silin	郑斯林	Male	Han
Shan Xiaoming	单晓鸣	Female	Han
Meng Xianzhong	孟宪忠	Male	Han
Zhao Changsheng	赵长胜	Male	Manchu
Zhao Fengqi	赵凤琦	Male	Han
Hu Mei	胡玫	Female	Han
Hu Jintao	胡锦涛	Male	Han
Ke Jun	柯军	Male	Han
Zha Peixin	查培新	Male	Han
Bai Suning	柏苏宁	Female	Han
Jiang Zhe	姜哲	Male	Han
Xuan Xiaoquan	宣晓泉	Male	Han
Zhu Yicai	祝义材	Male	Han
Fei Shengying	费圣英	Male	Han
Yao Jianhua	姚建华	Male	Han
Suo Lisheng	索丽生	Male	Han
Gu Xiaosong	顾晓松	Male	Han
Chai Xinjian	柴新建	Male	Han
Qian Yuebao	钱月宝	Female	Han
Qian Haixin	钱海鑫	Male	Han
Xu An	徐安	Male	Han
Xu Anbi	徐安碧	Male	Han
Xu Ming	徐明	Male	Han
Xu Jingren	徐镜人	Male	Han
Yin Yunfei	殷云飞	Male	Han
Gao Dekang	高德康	Male	Han
Gao Yijin	高毅进	Male	Han
Guo Guangyin	郭广银	Female	Han
Guo Rong	郭荣	Male	Han
Tang Yan	唐艳	Female	Han
Tao Siyan	陶思炎	Male	Han
Tao Haixia	陶海霞	Female	Han
Huang Zhendong	黄镇东	Male	Han
Cao Weixing	曹卫星	Male	Han
Cao Xinping	曹新平	Male	Han
Cui Guiliang	崔桂亮	Male	Han
Zhang Qing	章青	Male	Han
Yan Li	阎立	Male	Han
Yan Jianguo	阎建国	Male	Han
Liang Baohua	梁保华	Male	Han
Ge Fei	葛菲	Female	Han
Dong Caiping	董才平	Male	Han
Jiang Hongkun	蒋宏坤	Male	Han
Jiang Jianhua	蒋建华	Male	Han
Jiang Wanqiu	蒋婉求	Female	Han
Han Liming	韩立明	Female	Han
Cheng Junrong	程军荣	Male	Han
Yu Yunyao	虞云耀	Male	Han
Dou Xiping	窦希萍	Female	Manchu
Cai Fang	蔡昉	Male	Han
Pei Changcai	裴昌彩	Female	Han
Miao Xiexing	缪协兴	Male	Han
Miao Changwen	缪昌文	Male	Han
Miao Ruilin	缪瑞林	Male	Han
Fan Jinlong	樊金龙	Male	Han
Yan Kai	颜开	Male	Han
Pan Yonghe	潘永和	Male	Han
Xue Yusheng	薛禹胜	Male	Han
Dai Yaping	戴雅萍	Female	Han
=== Zhejiang === (90 seats)
Name	Chinese name	Gender	Ethnic
Yu Huida	于辉达	Male	Han
Ma Yi	马以	Male	Han
Wang Xiaotong	王小同	Male	Han
Wang Renzhou	王仁洲	Male	Han
Wang Ping'an	王平安	Male	Hui
Wang Yongming	王永明	Male	Han
Wang Ming	王鸣	Male	Han
Wang Jianhua	王建华	Male	Han
Wang Meizhen	王梅珍	Female	Han
You Xiaoping	尤小平	Male	Han
Che Xiaoduan	车晓端	Female	Han
Mao Guanglie	毛光烈	Male	Han
Fang Zhonghua	方中华	Male	Han
Fang Qing	方青	Female	Han
Li Yuezi	厉月姿	Female	Han
Lu Yiyu	卢亦愚	Male	Han
Feng Changgen	冯长根	Male	Han
Lü Fan	吕帆	Female	Han
Lü Zushan	吕祖善	Male	Han
Zhu Xinkang	朱新康	Male	Han
Qiao Chuanxiu	乔传秀	Female	Han
Ren Meiqin	任美琴	Female	Han
Zhuang Qichuan	庄启传	Male	Han
Liu Xiping	刘希平	Male	Han
Liu Xirong	刘锡荣	Male	Han
Qi Qi	齐奇	Male	Han
Xu Jiang	许江	Male	Han
Li Dapeng	李大鹏	Male	Han
Li Weining	李卫宁	Male	Han
Li Linghong	李令红	Male	Han
Li Rucheng	李如成	Male	Han
Li Mu	李牧	Male	Han
Li Keping	李科平	Male	Han
Yang Wei	杨卫	Male	Han
Yang Chengtao	杨成涛	Male	Han
Yang Xiaoxia	杨晓霞	Female	Han
Wu Ziying	吴子婴	Female	Han
Wu Guohua	吴国华	Male	Han
Wu Guiying	吴桂英	Female	Han
Qiu Jibao	邱继宝	Male	Han
Wang Huifang	汪惠芳	Female	Han
Chen Mingcai	沈明才	Male	Han
Zhang Jinru	张金如	Male	Han
Zhang Jianxing	张剑星	Male	Han
Zhang Xinjian	张新建	Male	Han
Zhang Dejiang	张德江	Male	Han
Lu Yuansheng	陆元盛	Male	Han
Lu Dongfu	陆东福	Male	Han
Chen Xiao'en	陈小恩	Male	Han
Chen Fei	陈飞	Male	Han
Chen Yunlong	陈云龙	Male	Han
Chen Kunzhong	陈昆忠	Male	Han
Chen Ronggao	陈荣高	Male	Han
Chen Tiexiong	陈铁雄	Male	Han
Chen Xiaohua	陈笑华	Female	Han
Chen Haixiao	陈海啸	Male	Han
Si Jianmin	姒健敏	Male	Han
Shao Zhanwei	邵占维	Male	Han
Fan Yi	范谊	Male	Han
Mao Weitao	茅威涛	Female	Han
Lin Yi	林燚	Female	Han
Jin Yingying	金颖颖	Female	Han
Zhou Xiaoguang	周晓光	Female	Han
Zheng Yuxin	郑玉歆	Male	Han
Zheng Jiemin	郑杰民	Male	Han
Zheng Jiwei	郑继伟	Male	Han
Zong Qinghou	宗庆后	Male	Han
Zhao Feng	赵丰	Male	Han
Zhao Linzhong	赵林中	Male	Han
Zhao Hongzhu	赵洪祝	Male	Han
Nan Cunhui	南存辉	Male	Han
Zhong Changming	钟昌明	Male	She
Yu Xuewen	俞学文	Male	Han
Yao Xianping	姚献平	Male	Han
Xia Shilin	夏士林	Male	Han
Xia Baolong	夏宝龙	Male	Han
Xu Qiufang	徐秋芳	Female	Han
Gao Qiang	高强	Male	Han
Cao Mianying	曹棉英	Female	Han
Cui Wei	崔巍	Female	Han
Yan Shougen	阎寿根	Male	Han
Liang Liming	梁黎明	Female	Han
Han Qide	韩启德	Male	Han
Chen Ghuifang	程惠芳	Female	Han
Fu Qiping	傅企平	Male	Han
Lu Guanqiu	鲁冠球	Male	Han
Chu Ping	褚平	Male	Han
Cai Qi	蔡奇	Male	Han
Mou Shuijuan	缪水娟	Female	Han
Xue Shaoxian	薛少仙	Male	Han
=== Anhui === (115 seats)
Name	Chinese name	Gender	Ethnic
Yu Yisu	于一苏	Female	Han
Wang Yafei	王亚非	Male	Han
Wang Xiufang	王秀芳	Female	Han
Wang Hong	王宏	Female	Han
Wang Mingsheng	王明胜	Male	Han
Wang Jinshan	王金山	Male	Han
Wang Jinfu	王金富	Male	Han
Wang Fuhong	王福宏	Male	Han
Wang Cuifeng	王翠凤	Female	Han
Wei Jianghong	韦江宏	Male	Han
Fang Xiping	方西屏	Male	Han
Fang Chunming	方春明	Male	Han
Fang Binxing	方滨兴	Male	Han
Kong Zhaoping	孔兆平	Male	Han
Kong Xinagxi	孔祥喜	Male	Han
Zuo Yan'an	左延安	Male	Han
Lu Ling	卢凌	Female	Han
Ye Shiqu	叶世渠	Male	Han
Zhu Guoping	朱国萍	Female	Han
Zhu Yong	朱勇	Male	Han
Zhu Haiyan	朱海燕	Female	Han
Zhu Duwen	朱读稳	Male	Han
Zhu Weifang	朱维芳	Female	Han
Zhu Huiqiu	朱慧秋	Female	Han
Ren Haishen	任海深	Male	Han
Liu Qingfeng	刘庆峰	Male	Han
Liu Zhenwei	刘振伟	Male	Han
Liu Jian	刘健	Male	Han
Liu Hui	刘惠	Female	Han
Liu Ruilian	刘瑞莲	Female	Han
Liu Depei	刘德培	Male	Han
Tang Linxiang	汤林祥	Male	Han
Xu Geliang	许戈良	Male	Han
Xu Chongxin	许崇信	Male	Han
Sun Yunfei	孙云飞	Male	Han
Sun Zhaoqi	孙兆奇	Male	Hui
Sun Zhigang	孙志刚	Male	Han
Ji Bing	纪冰	Male	Han
Su Xueyun	苏学云	Female	Hui
Li Hongming	李宏鸣	Male	Han
Li Guoling	李国玲	Female	Han
Li Ming	李明	Male	Han
Li Rongjie	李荣杰	Male	Han
Li Zhong'an	李重庵	Male	Han
Li Xiusong	李修松	Male	Han
Li Aiqing	李爱青	Male	Han
Li Bin	李斌	Female	Han
Yang Yada	杨亚达	Female	Han
Yang Jianbo	杨剑波	Male	Han
Wu Bangguo	吴邦国	Male	Han
Wu Cunrong	吴存荣	Male	Han
Wu Huaxia	吴华夏	Male	Han
Wu Xujun	吴旭军	Male	Han
Wu Minglou	吴明楼	Male	Han
He Bangxi	何帮喜	Male	Han
Yu Dena	余的娜	Female	Han
Yu Minhui	余敏辉	Male	Han
Wang Jirong	汪纪戎	Female	Han
Wang Hongkun	汪宏坤	Male	Han
Wang Chunlan	汪春兰	Female	Han
Chen Weiguo	沈卫国	Male	Han
Song Lihua	宋礼华	Male	Han
Song Guoquan	宋国权	Male	Han
Zhang Qingjun	张庆军	Male	Han
Zhang Baoshun	张宝顺	Male	Han
Zhang Tao	张涛	Male	Han
Lu Yaping	陆亚萍	Female	Han
Chen Xiansen	陈先森	Male	Han
Chen Qitao	陈启涛	Male	Han
Chen Shulong	陈树隆	Male	Han
Chen Zhangshui	陈章水	Male	Han
Luo Ping	罗平	Female	Han
Jin Huiqing	金会庆	Male	Han
Zhou Su	周溯	Male	Han
Pang Lijuan	庞丽娟	Female	Han
Zheng Yongfei	郑永飞	Male	Han
Zheng Jie	郑杰	Male	Han
Zheng Xiaoyan	郑晓燕	Female	Han
Meng Xiangrui	孟祥瑞	Male	Han
Hou Jianguo	侯建国	Male	Han
Jiang Yiyong	姜一勇	Male	Han
Yao Yuzhou	姚玉舟	Male	Han
Yao Minhe	姚民和	Male	Han
Yao Guiping	姚桂萍	Female	Han
Geng Xuemei	耿学梅	Female	Han
Xia He	夏鹤	Male	Han
Gu Jianguo	顾建国	Male	Han
Qian Yongyan	钱永言	Male	Han
Qian Niansun	钱念孙	Male	Han
Ni Yongpei	倪永培	Male	Han
Xu Dingfeng	徐顶峰	Male	Han
Xu Chonghua	徐崇华	Female	Han
Xu Jinglong	徐景龙	Male	Han
Gao Dengbang	高登榜	Male	Han
Guo Wensan	郭文叁	Male	Han
Xi Weijing	席蔚菁	Female	Han
Huang Yuezhong	黄岳忠	Male	Han
Cao Jie	曹杰	Male	Han
Cao Jinhai	曹金海	Male	Han
Cui Wei	崔伟	Male	Han
Jiang Houlin	蒋厚琳	Female	Han
Han Zaifen	韩再芬	Female	Han
Suo Bingxun	锁炳勋	Male	Hui
Cheng Yingfeng	程迎峰	Male	Han
Cheng Enfu	程恩富	Male	Han
Cheng Jing	程静	Female	Han
Lu Zhongzhu	鲁中祝	Female	Hui
Xie Li	谢力	Male	Han
Xie Guangxiang	谢广祥	Male	Han
Zang Shikai	臧世凯	Male	Han
Mou Xuegang	缪学刚	Male	Han
Pan Yixin	潘一新	Male	Han
Xue Ying	薛颖	Female	Han
Dai Min	戴敏	Female	Han
Tan Jieqing	檀结庆	Male	Han
=== Fujian === (62 seats)
Name	Chinese name	Gender	Ethnic
Ding Shizhong	丁世忠	Male	Hui
Wang Xianrong	王宪榕	Female	Han
Wang Jing	王晶	Female	Han
Wang Menghui	王蒙徽	Male	Han
Deng Liping	邓力平	Male	Han
Deng Benyuan	邓本元	Male	Han
Zhu Ming	朱明	Male	Han
Zhuang Xian	庄先	Male	Han
Zhuang Zhensheng	庄振生	Male	Han
Liu Cigui	刘赐贵	Male	Han
Liu Daoqi	刘道崎	Male	Han
Liu Dezhang	刘德章	Male	Han
Xu Shihui	许世辉	Male	Han
Xu Jinhe	许金和	Male	Han
Sun Chunlan	孙春兰	Female	Han
Yan Yixin	严以新	Male	Han
Su Wenjin	苏文金	Male	Han
Su Shulin	苏树林	Male	Han
Du Min	杜民	Female	Han
Li Mingrong	李明蓉	Female	Han
Li Jianguo	李建国	Male	Han
Li Yuxi	李欲晞	Male	Han
Li Xinyan	李新炎	Male	Han
Yang Yue	杨岳	Male	Han
Wang Yifu	汪毅夫	Male	Han
Zhang Xiujuan	张秀娟	Female	Han
Zhang Changping	张昌平	Male	Han
Zhang Jian	张健	Male	Han
Zhang Jiakun	张家坤	Male	Han
Chen Wendong	陈文东	Male	Han
Chen Zhengtong	陈正统	Male	Han
Chen Zhili	陈至立	Female	Han
Chen Xiurong	陈秀榕	Female	Han
Chen Zhonghe	陈忠和	Male	Han
Chen Jiadong	陈家东	Male	Han
Chen Sixi	陈斯喜	Male	Han
Fan Fangping	范方平	Male	Han
Lin Xinxin	林欣欣	Female	Han
Lin Zhelong	林哲龙	Male	Han
Lin Qiang	林强	Male	Han
Ouyang Yuanhe	欧阳元和	Male	Han
Zhou Lianqing	周联清	Male	Han
Zheng Songyan	郑松岩	Male	Han
Zheng Jie	郑捷	Female	MA
Zhao Jing	赵静	Female	Han
Shi Zuolin	施作霖	Male	Han
Jia Xitai	贾锡太	Male	Han
Ni Yuefeng	倪岳峰	Male	Han
Xu Chengyun	徐承云	Male	Han
Gao Xiaoming	高晓明	Male	Han
Huang Xiaojing	黄小晶	Male	Han
Huang Meilu	黄美缘	Female	Han
Huang Haihui	黄海辉	Male	Han
Gong Qinggai	龚清概	Male	Han
Zhang Liansheng	章联生	Male	Han
Zeng Jingping	曾静萍	Female	Han
Xie Hua'an	谢华安	Male	Han
Kai Qinghai	楷清海	Male	Gaoshan
Lai Anshan	赖鞍山	Male	Han
Lei Jinmei	雷金梅	Female	She
Bao Shaokun	鲍绍坤	Male	Han
Dai Zhongchuan	戴仲川	Male	Han
=== Jiangxi === (74 seats)
Name	Chinese name	Gender	Ethnic
Yu Guo	于果	Male	Han
Wan Kai	万凯	Male	Han
Ma Yanbo	马岩波	Male	Han
Wang Ping	王平	Male	Han
Wang Xiaofeng	王晓峰	Male	Han
Wang Hai	王海	Male	Han
Wang Ping	王萍	Female	Han
Wang Yi	王毅	Male	Han
Fang Zhiyuan	方志远	Male	Han
Yin Chengjie	尹成杰	Male	Han
Kong Dan	孔丹	Male	Han
Gan Liangmiao	甘良淼	Male	Han
Long Hong	龙红	Female	Han
Long Guoying	龙国英	Female	Han
Lan Nianying	兰念瑛	Female	She
Lü Bin	吕滨	Male	Han
Zhu Youlin	朱友林	Male	Han
Liu Sanqiu	刘三秋	Female	Han
Liu Lizu	刘礼祖	Male	Han
Liu Heping	刘和平	Male	Han
Liu Yanqiong	刘艳琼	Female	Han
Liu Jifu	刘积福	Male	Han
Liu Jie	刘捷	Male	Han
Jiang Xiangmei	江香梅	Female	Han
Sun Xiaoshan	孙晓山	Male	Han
Sun Jusheng	孙菊生	Male	Han
Su Rong	苏荣	Male	Han
Li Yuying	李玉英	Female	Han
Li Li	李利	Male	Han
Li Fang	李放	Male	Han
Li Yihuang	李贻煌	Male	Han
Xiao Yi	肖毅	Male	Han
Wu Fanghui	吴方辉	Male	Han
Wu Xinxiong	吴新雄	Male	Han
Wang Guangdao	汪光焘	Male	Han
Zhang Zhonghou	张忠厚	Male	Han
Zhang Jintao	张金涛	Male	Han
Zhang Dinglong	张定龙	Male	Hui
Zhang Yong	张勇	Male	Han
Lu Yonglan	陆永兰	Female	Han
Chen Liguo	陈立国	Male	Han
Chen Daheng	陈达恒	Male	Han
Chen Niandai	陈年代	Male	Han
Chen Zhisheng	陈志胜	Male	Han
Chen Chunping	陈春平	Female	Han
Yi Jinglin	易敬林	Male	Han
Zhou Meng	周萌	Male	Han
Meng Jianzhu	孟建柱	Male	Han
Zhao Zhiyong	赵智勇	Male	Han
Hu Youtao	胡幼桃	Male	Han
Hu Xian	胡宪	Male	Han
Hu Zhenpeng	胡振鹏	Male	Han
Zhong Hongguang	钟虹光	Male	Han
Yao Mugen	姚木根	Male	Han
Xu Guifen	徐桂芬	Female	Han
Ling Chengxing	凌成兴	Male	Han
Gao Xiaoqiong	高小琼	Male	Han
Tu Qinhua	涂勤华	Male	Han
Huang Zhiquan	黄智权	Male	Han
Gong Jianhua	龚建华	Male	Han
Lu Xinshe	鹿心社	Male	Han
Peng Hongsong	彭宏松	Male	Han
Dong Xiansheng	董仚生	Male	Han
Jingyi Dan	敬一丹	Female	Han
Jiang Ruming	蒋如铭	Male	Han
Fu Qionghua	傅琼华	Female	Han
Zeng Yejiu	曾页九	Male	Han
Zeng Qinghong	曾庆红	Female	Han
Xie Mulan	谢木兰	Female	Han
Lei Yuanjiang	雷元江	Male	Han
Yu Guoqing	虞国庆	Male	Han
Cai Xiaoming	蔡晓明	Male	Han
Liao Jinqiu	廖进球	Male	Han
Liao Liping	廖丽萍	Female	Han
=== Shandong === (180 seats)
Name	Chinese name	Gender	Ethnic
Ding Yuhua	丁玉华	Male	Han
Yu Xiaoyu	于晓玉	Female	Hui
Ma Pingchang	马平昌	Male	Han
Ma Xianfu	马先富	Male	Han
Ma Chunji	马纯济	Male	Han
Wang Yuancheng	王元成	Male	Han
Wang Wensheng	王文升	Male	Han
Wang Kemin	王可敏	Male	Han
Wang Lixin	王立新	Male	Han
Wang Gang	王刚	Male	Han
Wang Tingjiang	王廷江	Male	Han
Wang Shoudong	王守东	Male	Han
Wang Zhizhong	王志中	Male	Han
Wang Zhimin	王志民	Male	Han
Wang Li	王丽	Female	Hui
Wang Qishan	王岐山	Male	Han
Wang Qicheng	王启成	Male	Han
Wang Faliang	王法亮	Male	Han
Wang Guibo	王桂波	Male	Han
Wang Peiting	王培廷	Male	Han
Wang Yinxiang	王银香	Female	Han
Wang Suilian	王随莲	Female	Han
Wang Xinhong	王新红	Male	Han
Niu Baowei	牛宝伟	Male	Han
Niu Huilan	牛惠兰	Female	Han
Fang Caichen	方才臣	Male	Han
Yin Zhongqing	尹中卿	Male	Han
Yin Chuangui	尹传贵	Male	Han
Yin Huimin	尹慧敏	Female	Han
Kong Beihua	孔北华	Male	Han
Kong Qing	孔青	Male	Han
Deng Xiangyang	邓向阳	Male	Han
Deng Baojin	邓宝金	Female	Han
Cong Qiangzi	丛强滋	Male	Han
Feng Yisheng	冯怡生	Male	Han
Da Jianwen	达建文	Male	Han
Lü Mingchen	吕明辰	Male	Han
Ren Jishan	任纪善	Male	Han
Ren Jianguo	任建国	Male	Han
Hua Jianmin	华建敏	Male	Han
Zhuang Wenzhong	庄文忠	Male	Han
Liu Yifa	刘义发	Male	Han
Liu Feng	刘凤	Female	Mongol
Liu Xingliang	刘兴亮	Male	Han
Liu Xuejing	刘学景	Male	Han
Liu Jianwen	刘建文	Female	Hui
Liu Chunhong	刘春红	Female	Han
Liu Rongxi	刘荣喜	Male	Hui
Liu Xiqian	刘锡潜	Male	Han
Liu Xinguo	刘新国	Male	Mongol
Liu Jiakun	刘嘉坤	Male	Han
Jiang Wei	江卫	Male	Han
Jiang Linchang	江林昌	Male	Han
Jiang Bao'an	江保安	Male	Han
Tang Jianmei	汤建梅	Female	Hui
Xu Liquan	许立全	Male	Han
Xu Zhenchao	许振超	Male	Han
Xu Zhihui	许智慧	Female	Han
Xu Ruiju	许瑞菊	Female	Han
Sun Wensheng	孙文盛	Male	Han
Sun Pishu	孙丕恕	Male	Han
Sun Wei	孙伟	Female	Han
Sun Wei	孙伟	Male	Han
Sun Liqiang	孙利强	Male	Han
Sun Jing	孙菁	Female	Han
Ji Yujun	纪玉君	Male	Han
Mai Kangsen	麦康森	Male	Han
Su Shoutang	苏寿堂	Male	Han
Du Bo	杜波	Male	Han
Li Changshun	李长顺	Male	Han
Li Dongsheng	李东生	Male	Han
Li Mingmin	李名岷	Male	Han
Li Qingsi	李庆思	Male	Han
Li Guo'an	李国安	Male	Han
Li Jianhua	李建华	Male	Han
Li Jianguo	李建国	Male	Han
Li Hongfeng	李洪峰	Male	Han
Li Xueqin	李雪芹	Female	Han
Li Huidong	李惠东	Male	Hui
Li Xiangping	李湘平	Male	Han
Li Denghai	李登海	Male	Han
Li Zhaoxing	李肇星	Male	Han
Yang Ziqiang	杨子强	Male	Han
Yang Weicheng	杨伟程	Male	Han
Yang Jun	杨军	Male	Han
Yang Mianmian	杨绵绵	Female	Han
Wu Qian	吴倩	Female	Han
Wu Cuiyun	吴翠云	Female	Han
Wu Dexing	吴德星	Male	Han
Qiu Yafu	邱亚夫	Male	Han
Chen Zhiqiang	沈志强	Male	Han
Chen Chunyao	沈春耀	Male	Han
Song Wenxin	宋文新	Female	Han
Song Xinfang	宋心仿	Male	Han
Song Zuowen	宋作文	Male	Han
Song Changlin	宋昌林	Male	Han
Song Yiqiao	宋益乔	Male	Han
Zhang Caikui	张才奎	Male	Han
Zhang Shaojun	张少军	Male	Han
Zhang Jiangting	张江汀	Male	Han
Zhang Zhifa	张志法	Male	Han
Zhang Zhiyong	张志勇	Male	Han
Zhang Ruofei	张若飞	Male	Han
Zhang Zhongzheng	张忠正	Male	Han
Zhang Xuexin	张学信	Male	Han
Zhang Jianhua	张建华	Male	Han
Zhang Jianguo	张建国	Male	Han
Zhang Zhenchuan	张振川	Male	Han
Zhang Guiyu	张桂玉	Male	Han
Zhang Shuqin	张淑琴	Female	Han
Chen Yulan	陈玉兰	Female	Han
Chen Gong	陈功	Male	Han
Chen Wei	陈伟	Male	Han
Chen Huasen	陈华森	Male	Han
Chen Guiyun	陈桂云	Female	Buyei
Shao Fengjing	邵峰晶	Female	Han
Wu Guanghua	武广华	Male	Han
Wu Yuqiang	武玉强	Male	Han
Lin Fenghai	林峰海	Male	Han
Yu Zhangyu	郁章玉	Male	Han
Shang Ruifen	尚瑞芬	Female	Han
Guo Jiasen	国家森	Male	Han
Jin Lanying	金兰英	Female	Hui
Jin Zhiguo	金志国	Male	Han
Zhou Yuhua	周玉华	Male	Han
Zhou Houjian	周厚健	Male	Han
Zhou Sumin	周素敏	Female	Han
Zhou Xiaofeng	周晓峰	Male	Han
Zhou Qingli	周清利	Male	Han
Zhou Yaoqi	周瑶琪	Male	Han
Zong Chengle	宗成乐	Male	Han
Wan Qiusheng	宛秋生	Male	Hui
Zhao Zhiquan	赵志全	Male	Han
Zhao Buchang	赵步长	Male	Han
Zhao Chunlan	赵春兰	Female	Han
Zhao Shengxuan	赵胜轩	Male	Han
Zhao Runtian	赵润田	Male	Han
Zhao Jiajun	赵家军	Male	Han
Hao Jianzhi	郝建枝	Female	Han
Hao Cuijuan	郝翠娟	Female	Han
Rong Lanxiang	荣兰祥	Male	Han
Xiang Jianhai	相建海	Male	Han
Zhan Shuyi	战树毅	Male	Han
Yu Shuwei	俞书伟	Male	Han
Jiang Daming	姜大明	Male	Han
Jiang Weidong	姜卫东	Male	Han
Jiang Yikang	姜异康	Male	Han
Jiang Jian	姜健	Female	Han
Gong Xuebin	宫学斌	Male	Han
Fei Yunliang	费云良	Male	Han
Yuan Jinghua	袁敬华	Female	Han
Geng Jiahuai	耿加怀	Male	Han
Mo Zhaolan	莫照兰	Female	Zhuag
Li Jia	栗甲	Male	Han
Xia Chunting	夏春亭	Male	Han
Xia Geng	夏耕	Male	Han
Xu Bingyin	徐丙垠	Male	Han
Xu Huadong	徐华东	Male	Han
Xu Jinpeng	徐金鹏	Male	Han
Xu Xianming	徐显明	Male	Han
Xu Qing	徐清	Female	Han
Gao Mingqin	高明芹	Female	Han
Gao Xinting	高新亭	Male	Han
Guo Jincai	郭金才	Male	Han
Huang Ming	黄鸣	Male	Han
Gong Yaoqin	龚瑶琴	Female	Han
Chang Zhenyong	常振勇	Male	Han
Chang Dechuan	常德传	Male	Han
Kang Fengying	康凤英	Female	Han
Dong Fenghua	董风华	Female	Han
Dong Cuina	董翠娜	Female	Han
Han Yuqun	韩寓群	Male	Han
Jing Xinhai	景新海	Male	Han
Cheng Lin	程林	Male	Han
Fu Yanhua	傅延华	Male	Han
Wen Fujiang	温孚江	Male	Han
Tan Xuguang	谭旭光	Male	Han
Mu Fanmin	穆范敏	Male	Han
Dai Sujun	戴肃军	Male	Han
Dai Ruide	戴瑞德	Male	Han
=== Henan === (161 seats)
Name	Chinese name	Gender	Ethnic
Diao Zhaoqiu	刁兆秋	Male	Han
Wan Long	万隆	Male	Han
Ma Li	马力	Female	Han
Ma Wenfang	马文芳	Male	Han
Wang Ziliang	王子亮	Male	Han
Wang Shiyao	王仕尧	Male	Han
Wang Youli	王有利	Male	Han
Wang Gang	王刚	Male	Han
Wang Jinian	王纪年	Male	Han
Wang Longde	王陇德	Male	Han
Wang Mingyi	王明义	Male	Han
Wang Jianqi	王建奇	Male	Han
Wang Baocun	王保存	Male	Han
Wang Jumei	王菊梅	Female	Han
Wang Mengshu	王梦恕	Male	Han
Wang Yinliang	王银良	Male	Hui
Wang Pengjie	王鹏杰	Male	Han
Wang Xihui	王熙慧	Male	Han
Mao Jie	毛杰	Female	Han
Hua Youxun	化有勋	Male	Han
Jie Tongbin	介同彬	Male	Han
Ji Chengjiang	计承江	Male	Han
Kong Fanqun	孔凡群	Male	Han
Kong Yufang	孔玉芳	Female	Han
Kong Lingchen	孔令晨	Male	Han
Shi Xiushi	石秀诗	Male	Han
Lu Zhangong	卢展工	Male	Han
Shen Zhenjun	申振君	Male	Han
Shi Jichun	史济春	Male	Han
Lü Jinhu	吕金虎	Male	Hui
Zhu Wenchen	朱文臣	Male	Han
Zhu Xiayan	朱夏炎	Male	Han
Qiao Qiusheng	乔秋生	Male	Han
Qiao Bin	乔彬	Male	Han
Ren Keli	任克礼	Male	Han
Ren Qinxin	任沁新	Male	Han
Liu Dagong	刘大功	Male	Han
Liu Weixing	刘卫星	Male	Han
Liu Yunshan	刘云山	Male	Han
Liu Shenghui	刘生辉	Male	Han
Liu Zhihua	刘志华	Female	Han
Liu Guoqing	刘国庆	Male	Han
Liu Xinmin	刘新民	Male	Han
Guan Aihe	关爱和	Male	Han
Tang Yuxiang	汤玉祥	Male	Han
An Huiyuan	安惠元	Male	Han
Qi Jinli	祁金立	Male	Han
Xu Weigang	许为钢	Male	Han
Xu Yongyue	许永跃	Male	Han
Sun Xiulan	孙秀兰	Female	Han
Sun Jianke	孙建科	Male	Han
Sun Yaozhi	孙耀志	Male	Han
Mai Shirui	买世蕊	Female	Hui
Su Fugong	苏福功	Male	Han
Li Wei	李卫	Male	Han
Li Changjie	李长杰	Male	Han
Li Wenhui	李文慧	Male	Han
Li Ya	李亚	Male	Han
Li Chengyu	李成玉	Male	Hui
Li Qinggui	李庆贵	Male	Han
Li Hongxia	李红霞	Female	Han
Li Ke	李克	Male	Zhuang
Li Liancheng	李连成	Male	Han
Li Qihong	李其宏	Female	Han
Li Yingjie	李英杰	Male	Han
Li Guoying	李国英	Male	Han
Li Jinzhi	李金枝	Female	Han
Li Baishuan	李柏拴	Male	Han
Li Gen	李根	Male	Han
Li Liufa	李留法	Male	Han
Li Haiyan	李海燕	Female	Han
Li Chong	李崇	Male	Han
Li Qinglin	李清林	Male	Han
Li Lianwu	李联五	Male	Han
Li Qin	李勤	Female	Han
Li Shenming	李慎明	Male	Han
Lian Ziheng	连子恒	Male	Han
Wu Yuanquan	吴元全	Male	Han
Di Yingqi	邸瑛琪	Male	Manchu
Wang Yuansi	汪远思	Male	Han
Song Fengnian	宋丰年	Male	Han
Zhang Dawei	张大卫	Male	Han
Zhang Guangzhi	张广智	Male	Han
Zhang Liyong	张立勇	Male	Han
Zhang Bailiang	张百良	Male	Han
Zhang Quanmin	张全民	Male	Han
Zhang Quanshou	张全收	Male	Han
Zhang Junbang	张军邦	Male	Han
Zhang Rongsuo	张荣锁	Male	Han
Zhang Hong'en	张洪恩	Male	Han
Zhang Xiaoyang	张晓阳	Male	Han
Zhang Yingcen	张瀛岑	Male	Han
Chen Guozhen	陈国桢	Male	Han
Chen Zemin	陈泽民	Male	Han
Chen Yiyu	陈宜瑜	Male	Han
Chen Jiansheng	陈建生	Male	Han
Chen Xuefeng	陈雪枫	Male	Han
Miao Runpu	苗润圃	Male	Han
Fan Jun	范军	Male	Han
Lin Jingshun	林景顺	Male	Han
Hu Meiling	虎美玲	Female	Hui
Zhou Guoyun	周国允	Male	Han
Zhou Xiaochun	周晓春	Female	Han
Zhou Sen	周森	Male	Han
Zheng Yongkou	郑永扣	Male	Han
Zheng Youquan	郑有全	Male	Han
Zheng Maojie	郑茂杰	Male	Hui
Zheng Quan	郑荃	Male	Han
Meng Wei	孟伟	Male	Han
Zhao Qisan	赵启三	Male	Han
Zhao Qinglin	赵顷霖	Male	Han
Zhao Ming'en	赵明恩	Male	Han
Zhao Jiancai	赵建才	Male	Han
Zhao Suping	赵素萍	Female	Han
Hao Ping	郝萍	Female	Han
Hu Baosen	胡葆森	Male	Han
Nan Zhenzhong	南振中	Male	Han
Duan Yuxian	段玉贤	Male	Han
Jiang Ming	姜明	Male	Han
Yao Zhongliang	姚忠良	Male	Han
Yao Juquan	姚菊泉	Female	Han
Qin Yuhai	秦玉海	Male	Han
Yuan Jianguo	原建国	Male	Han
Qian Guoyu	钱国玉	Male	Han
Xu Guang	徐光	Male	Han
Xu Guangchun	徐光春	Male	Han
Xu Jichao	徐济超	Male	Han
Xu Dequan	徐德全	Male	Han
Ling Jiefang	凌解放	Male	Han
Guo Zhongkui	郭中奎	Male	Han
Guo Shengmin	郭生民	Female	Han
Guo Gengmao	郭庚茂	Male	Han
Guo Jianhua	郭建华	Female	Han
Guo Hongchang	郭洪昌	Male	Han
Guo Zhenfu	郭振甫	Male	Han
Guo Ruimin	郭瑞民	Male	Han
Tang Zuxuan	唐祖宣	Male	Han
Sang Jinke	桑金科	Male	Han
Huang Yuqing	黄玉清	Female	Han
Cao Weizhou	曹卫洲	Male	Han
Cao Weixin	曹维新	Male	Han
Cao Zhaoyang	曹朝阳	Male	Han
Cui Junhui	崔俊慧	Male	Han
Cui Xiaofeng	崔晓峰	Male	Han
Liang Tiehu	梁铁虎	Male	Han
Kou Bing'en	寇炳恩	Male	Han
Jiang Zhongpu	蒋忠仆	Male	Han
Jiang Duyun	蒋笃运	Male	Han
Chu Yaping	储亚平	Male	Han
Shi Yongxin	释永信	Male	Han
You Yinge	游吟歌	Female	Tujia
Lu Guoxian	路国贤	Male	Han
Cai Ning	蔡宁	Male	Han
Pei Chunliang	裴春亮	Male	Han
Xiong Weizheng	熊维政	Male	Han
Fan Huitao	樊会涛	Male	Han
Xue Jingxia	薛景霞	Female	Han
Huo Jinhua	霍金花	Female	Han
Dai Songling	戴松灵	Male	Han
Wei Wenbo	魏文波	Male	Han
Wei Xuezhu	魏学柱	Male	Han
=== Hubei === (125 seats)
Name	Chinese name	Gender	Ethnic
Ding Kemei	丁克美	Female	Han
Bo Fangying	卜仿英	Female	Han
Ma Guofu	马国富	Male	Han
Wang Yue'e	王月娥	Female	Han
Wang Wentong	王文童	Male	Han
Wang Yufen	王玉芬	Female	Han
Wang Liming	王利明	Male	Han
Wang Guosheng	王国生	Male	Han
Wang Jinchu	王金初	Female	Han
Wang Jianming	王建鸣	Male	Han
Wang Ling	王玲	Female	Han
Wang Tao	王涛	Male	Han
Wang Xiangxi	王祥喜	Male	Han
Wang Jing	王静	Female	Han
Mao Rifeng	毛日峰	Male	Han
Mao Zongfu	毛宗福	Male	Han
Chou Xiaole	仇小乐	Male	Han
Wen Huiguo	文会国	Male	Han
Deng Xiuxin	邓秀新	Male	Han
Deng Qilin	邓崎琳	Male	Han
Ye Qing	叶青	Male	Han
Ye Changbao	叶昌保	Male	Han
Tian Yuke	田玉科	Female	Tujia
Feng Zhigao	冯志高	Male	Han
Lü Zhongmei	吕忠梅	Female	Han
Zhu Hanqiao	朱汉桥	Male	Han
Zhu Dixiong	朱弟雄	Male	Han
Zhu Jianhua	朱建华	Male	Han
Liu Danli	刘丹丽	Female	Han
Liu Shunni	刘顺妮	Female	Han
Liu Xuerong	刘雪荣	Male	Han
Liu Daoming	刘道明	Male	Han
Liu Xihan	刘锡汉	Male	Han
Chi Li	池莉	Female	Han
Tang Wenquan	汤文全	Male	Han
Xu Jianmin	许健民	Male	Han
Ruan Chengfa	阮成发	Male	Han
Sun Youyuan	孙友元	Male	Han
Sun Ying'an	孙应安	Male	Han
Li Chuanqing	李传卿	Male	Han
Li Hongyun	李红云	Male	Han
Li Hongjin	李红锦	Female	Han
Li Huaizhen	李怀珍	Male	Han
Li Guozhang	李国璋	Male	Han
Li Yin	李茵	Female	Han
Li Jian	李健	Male	Han
Li Peigen	李培根	Male	Han
Li Hongzhong	李鸿忠	Male	Han
Li Pan	李磐	Male	Han
Yang Yunyan	杨云彦	Male	Han
Yang Yongliang	杨永良	Male	Han
Yang Xianlong	杨先龙	Male	Han
Yang Zezhu	杨泽柱	Male	Han
Yang Wei	杨威	Male	Han
Yang Jixue	杨继学	Male	Han
Xiao Hongjuan	肖红娟	Female	Han
Wu Shaoxun	吴少勋	Male	Han
Wu Xiufeng	吴秀凤	Female	Han
Wu Hengquan	吴恒权	Male	Han
He Shaoling	何少苓	Female	Han
Yu Zhuomin	余卓民	Male	Han
Xin Xiyu	辛喜玉	Female	Han
Wang Aiqun	汪爱群	Male	Han
Zhang Zhaoping	张召平	Male	Han
Zhang Baiqing	张柏青	Male	Han
Zhang Xiaoshan	张晓山	Male	Han
Zhang Aiguo	张爱国	Male	Han
Zhang Qiong	张琼	Female	Tujia
Zhang Furong	张富荣	Male	Han
Zhang Jing	张静	Female	Han
Chen Yilong	陈义龙	Male	Han
Chen Tianhui	陈天会	Male	Han
Chen Jixue	陈吉学	Male	Han
Chen Yong	陈勇	Male	Han
Chen Xiaoyan	陈晓燕	Female	Tujia
Chen Dingchang	陈鼎常	Male	Han
Miao Wei	苗圩	Male	Han
Fan Ruiping	范锐平	Male	Han
Luo Qingquan	罗清泉	Male	Han
Luo Qunhui	罗群辉	Male	Han
Zhou Xianwang	周先旺	Male	Tujia
Zhou Jianwei	周坚卫	Male	Han
Zhou Baosheng	周宝生	Male	Han
Zhou Jianyuan	周建元	Female	Han
Zhou Hongyu	周洪宇	Male	Han
Zhou Jiagui	周家贵	Male	Han
Zheng Shaosan	郑少三	Male	Han
Zheng Xinsui	郑心穗	Male	Han
Zhao Fasuo	赵发所	Male	Han
Hu Maocheng	胡茂成	Male	Tujia
Hou Chang'an	侯长安	Male	Han
Yao Shaobin	姚绍斌	Male	Miao
Qin Shunquan	秦顺全	Male	Han
Xia Juhua	夏菊花	Female	Han
Gu Hailiang	顾海良	Male	Han
Qian Yuankun	钱远坤	Male	Han
Xu Shiyou	徐世友	Male	Han
Xu Ping	徐平	Male	Han
Xu De	徐德	Male	Han
Guo Shenglian	郭生练	Male	Han
Guo Youming	郭有明	Male	Han
Guo Yuemei	郭粤梅	Female	Han
Tang Liangzhi	唐良智	Male	Han
Huang Yougen	黄有根	Male	Han
Huang Jun	黄俊	Female	Han
Huang Chuping	黄楚平	Male	Han
Cao Jianming	曹建明	Male	Han
Zhang Zhi'an	章治安	Male	Han
Liang Huiling	梁惠玲	Female	Han
Peng Mingquan	彭明权	Male	Han
Peng Qinghua	彭清华	Male	Han
Peng Fuchun	彭富春	Male	Han
Jing Dali	敬大力	Male	Han
Gu Shengzu	辜胜阻	Male	Han
Cheng Licai	程理财	Male	Han
Tong Guohua	童国华	Male	Han
Xie Shengming	谢圣明	Male	Han
Xie Mingliang	谢明亮	Male	Han
Lu Yongxiang	路甬祥	Male	Han
Lu Gang	路钢	Male	Han
Cai Hongzhu	蔡宏柱	Male	Han
Cai Qihua	蔡其华	Female	Han
Tan Gongyan	谭功炎	Male	Han
Xiong Derong	熊德荣	Male	Han
Dai Maorong	戴茂荣	Female	Han
=== Hunan === (117 seats)
Name	Chinese name	Gender	Ethnic
Yu Laishan	于来山	Male	Han
Ma Yong	马勇	Male	Han
Wang Shiqi	王石齐	Male	Han
Wang An'an	王安安	Female	Han
Wang Yangjuan	王阳娟	Female	Han
Wang Zhiying	王填	Female	Han
Wang Tian	王志英	Male	Han
Wen Huazhi	文花枝	Female	Han
Gan Lin	甘霖	Female	Han
Ye Wenzhi	叶文智	Male	Han
Tian Rubin	田儒斌	Male	Tujia
Dai Zhaoxia	代朝霞	Female	Han
Sheng Hui	圣辉	Male	Han
Zhu Xueqin	朱雪琴	Female	Han
Wu Donglan	伍冬兰	Female	Han
Re Nyuqi	任玉奇	Male	Han
Xiang Wenbo	向文波	Male	Han
Xiang Pinghua	向平华	Male	Tujia
Liu Benzhi	刘本之	Male	Han
Liu Pingjian	刘平建	Male	Han
Liu Xiaowu	刘晓武	Male	Han
Liu Aiping	刘爱平	Male	Han
Liu Qiwu	刘期武	Male	Han
Liu Xianghao	刘翔浩	Male	Han
Liu Xiang'e	刘湘娥	Female	Han
Liu Tan'ai	刘潭爱	Male	Han
Xu Zhongqiu	许仲秋	Male	Han
Xu Juyun	许菊云	Male	Han
Sun Jianguo	孙建国	Male	Han
Yang Guoxiu	阳国秀	Female	Han
Li Yilong	李亿龙	Male	Han
Li Kaixi	李开喜	Male	Han
Li Youzhi	李友志	Male	Han
Li Youmei	李友妹	Female	Miao
Li Qiaoyun	李巧云	Female	Han
Li Hua	李华	Male	Han
Li Jiang	李江	Male	Han
Li Zhixuan	李志轩	Male	Han
Li Jianxin	李建新	Male	Han
Li Shishi	李适时	Male	Han
Li Xianghong	李祥红	Male	Yao
Li Huanran	李焕然	Male	Han
Li Weijian	李维建	Male	Han
Li Xi	李曦	Female	Han
Yang Zhengwu	杨正午	Male	Tujia
Yang Shaojun	杨绍军	Male	Han
Yang Li	杨莉	Female	Han
Yang Xiaojia	杨晓嘉	Female	Han
Xiao Zijiang	肖自江	Male	Han
Xiao Liqiong	肖利琼	Female	Han
Wu Zhengyou	吴正有	Male	Miao
Wu Xiangdong	吴向东	Male	Han
Wu Jianping	吴建平	Female	Han
He Renchun	何仁春	Male	Han
He Yuncai	何运才	Male	Han
Yu Aiguo	余爱国	Male	Han
Zhang Pingying	张苹英	Female	Tujia
Zhang Fangping	张放平	Male	Han
Zhang Jianlin	张建林	Male	Han
Zhang Jianfei	张剑飞	Male	Han
Zhang Jianbo	张剑波	Male	Han
Zhang Shuofu	张硕辅	Male	Han
Zhang Deming	张德明	Male	Han
Chen Daifu	陈代富	Male	Han
Chen Guangzheng	陈光正	Male	Han
Chen Xiaoqiong	陈晓琼	Female	Han
Lin Wu	林武	Male	Han
Zhuo Xinping	卓新平	Male	Tujia
Luo He'an	罗和安	Male	Han
Luo Meiyuan	罗美元	Female	Han
Luo Zuliang	罗祖亮	Male	Han
Zhou Yuqing	周玉清	Male	Han
Zhou Benshun	周本顺	Male	Han
Zhou Zhaoda	周兆达	Male	Han
Zhou Changgong	周昌贡	Male	Han
Zhou Qiang	周强	Male	Han
Zheng Baiping	郑柏平	Male	Han
Zhao Xiaoming	赵小明	Male	Han
Zhao Xiangping	赵湘平	Male	Han
Zhao Fudong	赵富栋	Male	Han
Hu Weiwu	胡伟武	Male	Han
Hu Guochu	胡国初	Male	Han
Hu Jianwen	胡建文	Male	Han
Zhong Faping	钟发平	Male	Han
Zhong Yanmin	种衍民	Male	Han
Jiang Yuquan	姜玉泉	Male	Han
Jiang Shi	姜仕	Male	Han
Zhu Xuejun	祝学军	Female	Han
Yao Jiannian	姚建年	Male	Han
Yao Yuanzhen	姚媛贞	Female	Tujia
He Guoqiang	贺国强	Male	Han
He Keng	贺铿	Male	Han
Qin Xiyan	秦希燕	Male	Han
Mo Dewang	莫德旺	Male	Han
Xu Shousheng	徐守盛	Male	Han
Xu Keqin	徐克勤	Male	Miao
Xu Xianping	徐宪平	Male	Han
Guo Guangwen	郭光文	Male	Han
Tang Jiuhong	唐九红	Female	Han
Tang Jianqiang	唐建强	Male	Han
Huang Lanxiang	黄兰香	Female	Han
Huang Zhiming	黄志明	Male	Han
Qi Heping	戚和平	Male	Han
Gong Wusheng	龚武生	Male	Han
Gong Jiahe	龚佳禾	Male	Han
Kang Weimin	康为民	Male	Han
Peng Aihua	彭爱华	Female	Han
Jiang Anrong	蒋安荣	Male	Han
Fu Xihe	傅锡和	Male	Miao
Xie Zilong	谢子龙	Male	Han
Xie Yong	谢勇	Male	Han
Xie Hui	谢辉	Male	Han
Meng Lanfeng	蒙兰凤	Female	Dong
Liao Renbin	廖仁斌	Male	Han
Tan Yan	谭艳	Female	Han
Yan Jiansheng	颜坚生	Male	Han
Wei Xuanjun	魏旋君	Female	Han
=== Guangdong === (158 seats)
Name	Chinese name	Gender	Ethnic
Ma Xingtian	马兴田	Male	Han
Wang Longxia	王龙霞	Female	Han
Wang Dong	王东	Male	Han
Wang Ningsheng	王宁生	Male	Han
Wang Jun	王军	Male	Han
Wang Rusong	王如松	Male	Han
Wang Nanjian	王南健	Male	Han
Wang Xunzhang	王珣章	Male	Han
Kong Lingren	孔令人	Male	Han
Deng Qiaoling	邓巧玲	Female	Han
Deng Zhicong	邓志聪	Male	Yao
Deng Haiguang	邓海光	Male	Han
Deng Weilong	邓维龙	Male	Han
Long Hanrong	龙汉荣	Male	Han
Lu Zhonghe	卢钟鹤	Male	Han
Lu Ruihua	卢瑞华	Male	Han
Shen Dan	申丹	Female	Han
Bai Zhijian	白志健	Male	Han
Ning Yuanxi	宁远喜	Male	Han
Zhu Xiaodan	朱小丹	Male	Han
Wu Jintang	伍锦棠	Male	Han
Liu Xiaohua	刘小华	Male	Han
Liu Laiping	刘来平	Male	Han
Liu Wu	刘武	Male	Han
Liu Kun	刘昆	Male	Han
Liu Xuegeng	刘雪庚	Male	Han
Liu Fucai	刘富才	Male	Han
Tang Xikun	汤锡坤	Male	Han
Xu Qin	许勤	Male	Han
Mai Qingquan	麦庆泉	Male	Han
Su Wuxiong	苏武雄	Male	Han
Su Qingling	苏清玲	Female	Han
Li Yihu	李义虎	Male	Han
Li Fei	李飞	Male	Han
Li Dongsheng	李东生	Male	Han
Li Yongliang	李永良	Male	Han
Li Yongzhong	李永忠	Male	Han
Li Ruqiu	李汝求	Male	Han
Li Xinghua	李兴华	Male	Han
Li Xinghao	李兴浩	Male	Han
Lil Ili	李丽丽	Female	Han
Li Miaojuan	李妙娟	Female	Han
Li Linkai	李林楷	Male	Han
Li Bingji	李秉记	Male	Han
Li Jianhua	李建华	Male	Han
Li Ronggen	李容根	Male	Han
Li Shuming	李淑明	Female	Han
Li Jia	李嘉	Male	Han
Li Yuquan	李毓全	Male	Han
Yang Yuemei	杨月梅	Female	Zhuag
Yang Xiu'e	杨秀娥	Female	Han
Yang Haoming	杨浩明	Male	Han
Wu Musheng	吴木生	Male	Han
Wu Zixiang	吴自祥	Male	Han
Wu Ju	吴菊	Female	Han
Qiu Mei	邱玫	Female	Han
He Yuhua	何玉华	Male	Han
He Weiying	何伟英	Female	Han
He Hongcheng	何宏成	Male	Han
He Mei	何梅	Female	Han
He Jing	何婧	Female	Han
Yu Xizhi	余夕志	Male	Han
Yu Ziquan	余子权	Male	Han
Wang Yang	汪洋	Male	Han
Sha Zhenquan	沙振权	Male	Han
Song Yayang	宋亚养	Male	Han
Song Enlai	宋恩来	Male	Han
Song Hai	宋海	Male	Manchu
Zhang Guangning	张广宁	Male	Han
Zhang Lidian	张利钿	Male	Han
Zhang Guoquan	张国权	Male	Han
Zhang Yubiao	张育彪	Male	Han
Zhang Shuhua	张树华	Male	Han
Zhang Simin	张思民	Male	Hui
Zhang Xiaoming	张晓明	Male	Han
Zhang Fusheng	张富生	Male	Han
Chen Xiaochuan	陈小川	Female	Han
Chen Guangfu	陈广富	Male	Han
Chen Yunxian	陈云贤	Male	Han
Chen Dan	陈丹	Male	Han
Chen Yujie	陈玉杰	Female	Han
Chen Yongzhi	陈用志	Male	Han
Chen Hongping	陈弘平	Male	Han
Chen Weicai	陈伟才	Male	Han
Chen Huawei	陈华伟	Male	Han
Chen Yaosheng	陈杳生	Male	Zhuang
Chen Guo'an	陈国安	Male	Han
Chen Yini	陈怡霓	Female	Han
Chen Hongxian	陈洪先	Male	Han
Chen Yong	陈勇	Male	Han
Chen Jiaji	陈家记	Male	Han
Chen Xuerong	陈雪荣	Female	Han
Chen Min	陈敏	Female	Han
Chen Shu	陈舒	Female	Han
Chen Rui'ai	陈瑞爱	Female	Han
Chen Chaodian	陈潮钿	Male	Han
Chen Yaoguang	陈耀光	Male	Han
Zhao Yuang	招玉芳	Female	Han
Lin Shaochun	林少春	Male	Han
Lin Daofan	林道藩	Male	Han
Lin Xinhua	林新华	Male	Han
Lin Shuguang	林曙光	Male	Han
Ou Guangyuan	欧广源	Male	Han
Ou Zhenzhi	欧真志	Male	Han
Ming Sheng	明生	Male	Han
Luo Weiqi	罗伟其	Male	Han
Luo Yuanfang	罗远芳	Female	Han
Zhou Haibo	周海波	Male	Han
Xian Dongmei	冼东妹	Female	Han
Zheng Riqiang	郑日强	Male	Han
Zheng Hong	郑红	Male	Han
Zheng Zhentao	郑振涛	Male	Han
Zheng E	郑鄂	Male	Han
Meng Xiangkai	孟祥凯	Male	Han
Zhao Juhua	赵菊花	Female	Han
Hu Xiaoyan	胡小燕	Female	Han
Zhong Shijian	钟世坚	Male	Han
Zhong Yangsheng	钟阳胜	Male	Han
Zhong Qiquan	钟启权	Male	Han
Zhong Mingzhao	钟明照	Male	Han
Zhong Nanshan	钟南山	Male	Han
Zhong Huanqing	钟焕清	Male	Han
He Youlin	贺优琳	Male	Han
Yuan Guibin	袁桂彬	Male	Han
Yuan Chao	袁超	Male	Han
Ni Le	倪乐	Male	Han
Ni Huiying	倪惠英	Female	Han
Xu Long	徐龙	Male	Han
Xu Yuanyuan	徐源远	Female	Manchu
Gao Siren	高祀仁	Male	Han
Huang Longyun	黄龙云	Male	Han
Huang Daren	黄达人	Male	Han
Huang Huahua	黄华华	Male	Han
Huang Yangxu	黄阳旭	Male	Han
Huang Liman	黄丽满	Female	Han
Huang Qibin	黄启彬	Male	Han
Huang Xuejun	黄学军	Female	Han
Huang Xihua	黄细花	Female	Han
Huang Bingzhang	黄炳章	Male	Han
Huang Hongming	黄鸿明	Male	Han
Huang Huiqiu	黄辉球	Male	Han
Cui Zhenji	崔真基	Male	Han
Liang Yaowen	梁耀文	Male	Han
Liang Yaohui	梁耀辉	Male	Han
Dong Mingzhu	董明珠	Female	Han
Jiang Haiying	蒋海鹰	Female	Han
Lu Xiulu	鲁修禄	Male	Han
Zeng Qinghong	曾庆洪	Male	Han
Wen Pengcheng	温鹏程	Male	Han
Xie Qianghua	谢强华	Male	Han
Lai Xiuhua	赖秀华	Female	Han
Lai Kunhong	赖坤洪	Male	Han
Lei Yulan	雷于蓝	Female	Han
Lei Xiaoling	雷晓凌	Female	Han
Cai Mahui	蔡妈辉	Male	Han
Cai Zongze	蔡宗泽	Male	Han
Tan Jutian	谭钜添	Male	Han
Pan Haoxuan	潘皓炫	Male	Han
=== Guangxi === (89 seats)
Name	Chinese name	Gender	Ethnic
Nai Donghong	乃东红	Male	Zhuang
Ma Biao	马飚	Male	Zhuang
Wang Youwei	王幼薇	Female	Zhuag
Wang Xiaohua	王晓华	Male	Han
Wang Aiqin	王爱勤	Female	Zhuag
Wei Feiyan	韦飞燕	Female	Zhuag
Wei Fenping	韦芬萍	Female	Zhuag
Wei Liuchun	韦柳春	Female	Zhuag
Deng Wen	邓文	Male	Zhuang
Gan Shanze	甘善泽	Male	Zhuang
Shi Yingwen	史英文	Male	Han
Hui Liangyu	回良玉	Male	Hui
Xiang Huiling	向惠玲	Female	Zhuag
Liu Zhengdong	刘正东	Male	Han
Liu Qingning	刘庆宁	Male	Zhuang
Tang Shibao	汤世保	Male	Han
Nong Yimei	农艺梅	Female	Zhuag
Nong Zhiyi	农智毅	Male	Zhuang
Su Mingfang	苏明芳	Male	Gin
Su Daoyan	苏道俨	Male	Han
Li Hanjin	李汉金	Male	Han
Lil Ianning	李连宁	Male	Han
Li Jinzao	李金早	Male	Han
Li Yanning	李艳宁	Female	Zhuag
Li Min	李敏	Female	Zhuag
Yang Xiaoping	杨小平	Male	Han
Yang Jian	杨建	Male	Han
Yang Shengchuan	杨盛川	Male	Miao
Yang Qin	杨琴	Female	Zhuag
Lian Younong	连友农	Male	Han
Xiao Hua	肖化	Male	Tujia
Wu Guanglin	吴广林	Male	Zhuang
Wu Junjun	吴俊军	Male	Zhuang
Wu Heng	吴恒	Male	Han
Wu Jiaquan	吴家权	Male	Mulao
Yu Yuanhui	余远辉	Male	Yao
Chen Bingsheng	沈并昇	Male	Zhuang
Zhang Shaokang	张少康	Male	Han
Zhang Xiulong	张秀隆	Male	Han
Lu Yun	陆云	Female	Zhuag
Lu Bing	陆兵	Male	Zhuang
Lu Minglin	陆鸣林	Male	Zhuang
Lu Xuemei	陆雪梅	Female	Zhuag
Chen Gang	陈刚	Male	Han
Chen Zhong	陈仲	Male	Han
Chen Xiangqun	陈向群	Male	Han
Chen Guanliang	陈关良	Male	Han
Chen Lidan	陈利丹	Male	Han
Chen Wu	陈武	Male	Zhuang
Chen Qiuhua	陈秋华	Male	Han
Lin Fan	林繁	Male	Zhuang
Luo Yaling	罗雅龄	Female	Yao
Luo Dianlong	罗殿龙	Male	Zhuang
Luo Liming	罗黎明	Male	Zhuang
Jin Xiangjun	金湘军	Male	Han
Zhou Ruqiang	周如强	Male	Zhuang
Zhou Huaikang	周怀慷	Male	Han
Zhou Jianjun	周建军	Male	Han
Zhou Jian	周健	Male	Zhuang
Zhao Yueqin	赵乐秦	Male	Han
Zhao Guikun	赵贵坤	Male	Yao
Mo Xiaosha	莫小莎	Female	Zhuag
Mo Yanshi	莫雁诗	Male	Han
Yan Ping	晏平	Male	Han
Guo Shengkun	郭声琨	Male	Han
Tang Chengliang	唐成良	Male	Han
Huang Fangfang	黄方方	Male	Zhuang
Huang Rumei	黄如梅	Female	Zhuag
Huang Liangbo	黄良波	Male	Han
Huang Helong	黄和龙	Male	Zhuang
Huang Qiudi	黄秋娣	Female	Zhuag
Cao Bochun	曹伯纯	Male	Han
Zhang Yuanxin	章远新	Male	Han
Yan Baoping	阎保平	Female	Han
Liang Qibo	梁启波	Male	Han
Peng Zuyi	彭祖意	Male	Yao
Dong Ling	董凌	Male	Miao
Jiang Xiangming	蒋向明	Male	Maonan
Tan Jianning	覃建宁	Female	Zhuag
Fu Hongyu	傅宏裕	Male	Han
Xie Naitang	谢迺堂	Male	Han
Lan Tianli	蓝天立	Male	Zhuang
Lan Shengxin	蓝盛新	Male	Zhuang
Meng Tieying	蒙铁英	Female	Zhuag
Lai Yimin	赖一民	Male	Dong
Lai Jian'an	赖建安	Male	Han
Liao Ru'en	廖如恩	Male	Zhuang
Pan Yongzhong	潘永钟	Male	Zhuang
Pan Xuehong	潘雪红	Female	Zhuag
=== Hainan === (21 seats)
Name	Chinese name	Gender	Ethnic
Wei Liucheng	卫留成	Male	Han
Wang Yixin	王一新	Male	Han
Wang Shouchu	王守初	Female	Han
Wang Jiquan	王积权	Male	Li
Wang Xiong	王雄	Male	Li
Deng Zeyong	邓泽永	Male	Miao
Jiming Jiang	吉明江	Male	Li
Lü Wei	吕薇	Female	Han
Li Jianbao	李建保	Male	Han
Li Xiansheng	李宪生	Male	Han
Wu Changyuan	吴昌元	Male	Han
Yu Yonghua	余永华	Male	Han
Zhang Mingyi	张明义	Male	Han
Chen Guocheng	陈国诚	Male	Li
Luo Baoming	罗保铭	Male	Han
Hao Ruyu	郝如玉	Male	Han
Jiang Sixian	姜斯宪	Male	Han
Gao Zhiguo	高之国	Male	Han
Fu Guihua	符桂花	Female	LI
Jiang Dingzhi	蒋定之	Male	Han
Dai Bingguo	戴秉国	Male	Tujia
=== Chongqing === (61 seats)
Name	Chinese name	Gender	Ethnic
Ma Zhigeng	马之庚	Male	Han
Ma Zhengqi	马正其	Male	Han
Ma Zhongyuan	马忠源	Male	Han
Wang Yunlong	王云龙	Male	Han
Wang Lijun	王立军	Male	Mongol
Wang Yunnong	王耘农	Male	Han
Wang Xiaolin	王晓琳	Female	Han
Wang Hongju	王鸿举	Male	Han
Wang Yue	王越	Male	Han
Yin Jiaxu	尹家绪	Male	Han
Ai Zhiquan	艾智泉	Male	Han
Ye Linwei	叶麟伟	Female	Han
Bai Lisha	白丽莎	Female	Han
Hua Yusheng	华渝生	Male	Han
Liu Guanglei	刘光磊	Male	Han
Liu Baoya	刘宝亚	Male	Tujia
An Qihong	安启洪	Male	Han
Sun Shenlin	孙甚林	Male	Tujia
Sun Xiaomei	孙晓梅	Female	Han
Li Xiaoyan	李小燕	Female	Miao
Yang Tianyi	杨天怡	Male	Han
Yang Qingyu	杨庆育	Male	Han
Wu Yajun	吴亚军	Female	Han
Wu Zaiju	吴再举	Male	Miao
Wu Jianglin	吴江林	Male	Han
Wu Zhenglong	吴政隆	Male	Han
Wang Xia	汪夏	Female	Han
Shen Tiemei	沈铁梅	Female	Han
Zhang Guo'an	张国安	Male	Han
Zhang Ling	张玲	Female	Han
Chen Wanzhi	陈万志	Male	Han
Chen Cungen	陈存根	Male	Han
Chen Guangguo	陈光国	Male	Han
Chen Zhonglin	陈忠林	Male	Han
Chen Guiyun	陈贵云	Male	Han
Wu Xiufeng	武秀峰	Male	Han
Luo Zhongli	罗中立	Male	Han
Zhou Ping	周平	Female	Han
Zhou Guangquan	周光权	Male	Han
Zhou Qi	周琦	Female	Han
Zheng Xiangdong	郑向东	Male	Han
Hu Jiankang	胡健康	Male	Han
Duan Laka	段拉卡	Male	Han
Jiang Xingchang	姜兴长	Male	Han
Yuan Changyu	袁昌玉	Female	Han
Xia Zhining	夏之宁	Male	Han
Guo Xiangdong	郭向东	Male	Han
Tang Hongjun	唐洪军	Male	Han
Tu Jianhua	涂建华	Male	Han
Huang Qifan	黄奇帆	Male	Han
Sheng Yanong	盛娅农	Female	Han
Cui Jian	崔坚	Male	Han
Kang Houming	康厚明	Male	Han
Han Deyun	韩德云	Male	Han
Hei Xinwen	黑新雯	Female	Han
Cheng Yiju	程贻举	Male	Han
Lu Shankun	鲁善坤	Male	Han
Xie Xiaojun	谢小军	Male	Han
Pu Haiqing	蒲海清	Male	Han
Tan Qiwei	谭栖伟	Male	Tujia
Bo Xilai	薄熙来	Male	Han
=== Sichuan === (150 seats)
Name	Chinese name	Gender	Ethnic
Ma Yuanzhu	马元祝	Male	Han
Ma Hua	马华	Male	Tibetan
Ma Zonghui	马宗慧	Female	Hui
Wang Ji	王计	Male	Han
Wang Zhengrong	王正荣	Male	Han
Wang Dongzhou	王东洲	Male	Han
Wang Zaiyin	王在银	Male	Han
Wang Hua	王华	Male	Han
Wang Yukun	王宇坤	Male	Han
Wang Zuoming	王佐明	Male	Hui
Wang Huaichen	王怀臣	Male	Han
Wang Jin	王劲	Male	Han
Wang Mingrong	王明容	Female	Miao
Wang Mingwen	王明雯	Female	Yi
Wang Shiwen	王诗文	Female	Tibetan
Wang Jianjun	王建军	Male	Han
Wang Pinsheng	王品盛	Male	Han
Wang Hailin	王海林	Male	Han
Wang Minghui	王铭晖	Male	Han
Wang Lin	王琳	Female	Han
Wang Yu	王瑜	Male	Han
Wang Qi	王麒	Female	Han
Mao Jinfang	毛金芳	Female	Yi
Deng Chuan	邓川	Male	Han
Gan Daoming	甘道明	Male	Han
Zuo Wanjun	左万军	Male	Han
Jiadeng Luorong Xiangba	甲登·洛绒向巴	Male	Tibetan
Bai Yun	白云	Male	Yi
Tong Jie	仝捷	Male	Han
Zhu Yizhuang	朱以庄	Male	Han
Qiao Tianming	乔天明	Male	Han
Ren Zhenglong	任正隆	Male	Han
Liu Yushun	刘玉顺	Male	Han
Liu Chengming	刘成鸣	Male	Han
Liu Shoupei	刘守培	Male	Han
Liu Jin	刘进	Male	Han
Liu Bozhong	刘伯忠	Male	Han
Liu Canglong	刘沧龙	Male	Han
Liu Qibao	刘奇葆	Male	Han
Liu Xiaoguang	刘晓光	Female	Han
Liu Xiaohua	刘晓华	Male	Han
Qi Wenchao	齐文超	Male	Han
Jiang Shanming	江善明	Male	Han
Sun Chuanmin	孙传敏	Male	Han
Sun Chun	孙纯	Male	Han
Hua Xin	花欣	Male	Han
Yan Junbo	严俊波	Male	Han
Li Changchun	李长春	Male	Han
Li Weiguo	李为国	Male	Qiang
Li Yaping	李亚平	Male	Han
Li Changping	李昌平	Male	Tibetan
Li Mingchang	李明昌	Male	Han
Li Jianhua	李建华	Male	Han
Li Chuncheng	李春城	Male	Han
Li Zhuo	李酌	Male	Han
Li Xiaohua	李晓华	Female	Han
Li Jiaming	李家明	Male	Han
Li Chongxi	李崇禧	Male	Han
Li Jing	李静	Female	Han
Yang Shiwu	杨士武	Male	Han
Yang Bangjie	杨邦杰	Male	Han
Yang Xingping	杨兴平	Male	Han
Yang Zhiwen	杨志文	Male	Han
Yang Xiuying	杨秀英	Female	Yi
Yang Hongbo	杨洪波	Male	Han
Yang Juan	杨娟	Female	Han
Yang Mei	杨梅	Female	Han
Yang Cuifang	杨翠芳	Female	Han
Xiao Helian	肖和联	Female	Han
Wu Guanglei	吴光镭	Male	Han
Wu Zegang	吴泽刚	Male	Tibetan
Wu Xiaohua	吴晓华	Male	Han
Wu Xinchun	吴新春	Female	Han
He Yehui	何晔晖	Female	Han
Yu Zisu	余自甦	Male	Han
Leng Gang	冷刚	Male	Han
Wang Junlin	汪俊林	Male	Han
Chen Guangming	沈光明	Male	Han
Song Lianghua	宋良华	Female	Han
Zhang Zhitie	张支铁	Male	Yi
Zhang Zhongwei	张中伟	Male	Han
Zhang Zhenggui	张正贵	Male	Han
Zhang Ning	张宁	Male	Han
Zhang Zuoha	张作哈	Male	Yi
Zhang Yudong	张雨东	Male	Han
Zhang Guofu	张国富	Male	Han
Zhang Xuezhong	张学忠	Male	Han
Zhang Shuping	张树平	Male	Han
Zhang Chongming	张崇明	Male	Han
Zhang Beibei	张蓓蓓	Female	Yi
Alai	阿来	Male	Tibetan
Chen Wuyi	陈五一	Male	Tujia
Chen Wenhua	陈文华	Male	Han
Chen Jiagui	陈佳贵	Male	Han
Chen Zhilin	陈智林	Male	Han
Wu Bin	武斌	Female	Han
Yingcuo	英措	Female	Tibetan
Lin Hong	林红	Female	Tibetan
Yi Minli	易敏利	Male	Han
Luo Chunmei	罗春梅	Female	Yi
Luo Qiang	罗强	Male	Han
Luo Qinhong	罗勤宏	Male	Han
Luo Yiping	罗毅平	Male	Han
Shi Jun	侍俊	Male	Han
Zhou Yuan	周原	Male	Han
Zheng Xiaoxing	郑晓幸	Male	Han
Zhao Lingying	赵玲英	Female	Han
Hu Changsheng	胡昌升	Male	Han
Hu Shuxiang	胡树祥	Male	Han
Ke Zunhong	柯尊洪	Male	Han
Hou Yiping	侯一平	Male	Han
Hou Yibin	侯义斌	Male	Han
Hou Xiongfei	侯雄飞	Male	Han
Hou Rong	侯蓉	Female	Han
Jiang Xiaoting	姜晓亭	Male	Han
Luo Longsen	骆隆森	Male	Han
Mo Wenxiu	莫文秀	Female	Han
Xia Ji'en	夏绩恩	Male	Han
Xu Xuemin	徐学民	Male	Han
Gao Xianhai	高先海	Male	Han
Guo Yongxiang	郭永祥	Male	Han
Guo Hongmei	郭红梅	Female	Han
Xi Yifang	席义方	Male	Han
Tang Limin	唐利民	Male	Han
Tang Qiao	唐桥	Male	Han
Tang Yanzi	唐燕子	Female	Han
Tu Wentao	涂文涛	Male	Han
Huang Xiaoxiang	黄小祥	Male	Han
Huang Shunfu	黄顺福	Male	Han
Huang Yanrong	黄彦蓉	Female	Han
Huang Jinsheng	黄锦生	Male	Han
Cao Jiafu	曹家福	Male	Han
Cui Fuhua	崔富华	Female	Han
Kang Yongheng	康永恒	Male	Han
Liang Xiyang	梁熙扬	Male	Han
Liang Huixing	梁慧星	Male	Han
Peng Xianjue	彭先觉	Male	Han
Peng Yu	彭渝	Male	Han
Ge Honglin	葛红林	Male	Han
Jiang Jufeng	蒋巨峰	Male	Han
Han Zhongxin	韩忠信	Male	Han
Fu Yonglin	傅勇林	Male	Han
Ton Gruochun	童若春	Female	Han
Xie Kaihua	谢开华	Male	Han
Xie Tianyou	谢天佑	Male	Han
Lei Hongjin	雷洪金	Male	Han
Jian Qin	简勤	Male	Han
Liao Jikang	廖继康	Male	Han
Wei Hong	魏宏	Male	Han
Wei Qin	魏琴	Female	Han
=== Guizhou === (67 seats)
Name	Chinese name	Gender	Ethnic
Yu Yang	于扬	Male	Han
Wang Shijie	王世杰	Male	Han
Wang Siqi	王思齐	Male	Han
Wang Shengjun	王胜俊	Male	Han
Deng Zhihong	邓志宏	Male	Miao
Shi Zongyuan	石宗源	Male	Hui
Long Gang	龙刚	Male	Miao
Shen Xiaoqing	申晓庆	Male	Han
Ling Jihua	令计划	Male	Han
Bao Kexin	包克辛	Male	Han
Lü Jianjun	吕建军	Female	Han
Liu Yimin	刘一民	Male	Han
Liu Qiaoying	刘乔英	Female	Buyei
Liu Yuankun	刘远坤	Male	Miao
Sun Chengyi	孙诚谊	Male	Han
Sun Yuan	孙袁	Female	Han
Li Feiyue	李飞跃	Male	Dong
Li Yuecheng	李月成	Male	Miao
Li Min	李岷	Male	Han
Yang Fengling	杨凤玲	Female	Buyei
Yang Xiuxi	杨秀锡	Male	Dong
Yang Guixin	杨贵新	Female	Dong
Yang Hongbo	杨洪波	Male	Han
Yang Xue	杨雪	Female	Miao
Shu Xiaomei	束晓梅	Female	Han
Xiao Yong'an	肖永安	Male	Han
Wu Xiaoling	吴晓灵	Female	Han
Yu Weixiang	余维祥	Male	Han
Song Xinmin	张生枝	Male	Han
Zhang Shengzhi	宋新民	Male	Han
Zhang Jiachun	张加春	Male	Sui
Chen Weidong	陈卫东	Male	Han
Chen Zhong	陈中	Male	Han
Chen Mingming	陈鸣明	Male	Buyei
Chen Junping	陈俊平	Male	Han
Chen Ping	陈萍	Female	Yi
Gou Tianlin	苟天林	Male	Han
Lin Shusen	林树森	Male	Han
Ouyang Qiansen	欧阳黔森	Male	Han
Luo Tao	罗涛	Female	Buyei
Ji Keliang	季克良	Male	Han
Qu Qinglin	屈庆麟	Male	Han
Zhao Kezhi	赵克志	Male	Han
Zhu Deguang	祝德光	Male	Miao
Yao Jianxiang	姚建祥	Male	Buyei
Yao Xiaoying	姚晓英	Female	Han
Yao Yizhou	姚懿洲	Male	Dong
Qin Rupei	秦如培	Male	Han
Yuan Zhou	袁周	Male	Han
Li Zhanshu	栗战书	Male	Han
Gao Wanneng	高万能	Male	Tujia
Guo Ziyi	郭子仪	Male	Han
Tang Shili	唐世礼	Female	Buyei
Tao Huabi	陶华碧	Female	Han
Sang Guowei	桑国卫	Male	Han
Huang Bangquan	黄榜泉	Male	Buyei
Cao Hongxing	曹洪兴	Male	Han
Gong Xianyong	龚贤永	Male	Han
Cui Yadong	崔亚东	Male	Han
Peng Boyuan	彭伯元	Male	Han
Lu Zhiming	禄智明	Male	Yi
Meng Qiliang	蒙启良	Male	Miao
Lei Ayouduo	雷阿幼朵	Female	Miao
Mu Degui	慕德贵	Male	Han
Liao Guoxun	廖国勋	Male	Tujia
Huo Ying	霍瑛	Female	Han
Wei Yongzhu	魏永柱	Male	Han
=== Yunan === (91 seats)
Name	Chinese name	Gender	Ethnic
Ding Xiuhua	丁秀花	Female	Nu
Dao Linyin	刀林荫	Female	Dai
Ma Zhengshan	马正山	Male	Derung
Ma Jilin	马吉林	Male	Hui
Ma Ziying	马自英	Female	Miao
Wang Tianhai	王田海	Male	Han
Wang Junzheng	王君正	Male	Han
Wang Mingquan	王明权	Male	Han
Wang Minghui	王明辉	Male	Han
Wang Chengcai	王承才	Male	Zhuang
Wang Shufen	王树芬	Female	Tibetan
Wang Hong	王虹	Female	Yi
Wang Hailiang	王海亮	Male	Han
Wang Minzheng	王敏正	Male	Han
Wang Ying	王瑛	Female	Bai
Wang Fumin	王富民	Male	Hui
Niu Shaoyao	牛绍尧	Male	Han
Deng Yonghe	邓永和	Male	Yao
Shi Chunyun	石春云	Male	Lhoba
Long Jiang	龙江	Male	Han
Bai Fengzhi	白凤芝	Female	Hani
Bai Baoxing	白保兴	Male	Yi
Bai Enpei	白恩培	Male	Han
Bao Bulu	包布鲁	Male	Jino
Lü Yanling	吕燕玲	Female	Han
Zhu Shaoming	朱绍明	Male	Han
Liu Shaozhong	刘绍忠	Male	Han
Mi Dongsheng	米东生	Male	Han
Chamba Gyenzel	江巴吉才	Male	Tibetan
Xu Zhiqin	许志琴	Female	Han
Xu Qianfei	许前飞	Male	Han
Xu Hai	许海	Male	Han
Sun Chunlan	孙春兰	Female	Achang
Li Yunlong	李云龙	Male	Yi
Li Zhengyang	李正阳	Male	Han
Li Jiheng	李纪恒	Male	Han
Li Shuxian	李树仙	Female	Yi
Li Peishan	李培山	Male	Han
Li Fuzhen	李福珍	Female	Hani
Li Jin	李瑾	Female	Han
Yang Yamei	杨亚梅	Female	Yi
Yang Guangcheng	杨光成	Male	Baii
Yang Guangyin	杨光银	Male	Yi
Yang Jinsong	杨劲松	Female	Naxi
Yang Ming	杨明	Male	Han
Yang Yan	杨艳	Female	Deang
Yang Fusheng	杨福生	Male	Hani
He Jinping	何金平	Male	Baii
He Jianwen	何剑文	Male	Baii
He Yong	何勇	Male	Han
Yu Mayue	余麻约	Male	Jingpo
Zou Ping	邹萍	Female	Yi
Chen Peiping	沈培平	Male	Han
Zhang Xiulan	张秀兰	Female	Miao
Zhang Meilan	张美兰	Female	Hani
Zhang Zulin	张祖林	Male	Han
Zhang Weijian	张惟建	Male	Han
Chen Jianguo	陈建国	Male	Tibetan
Chen Qiusheng	陈秋生	Male	Han
Chen Jiyan	陈继延	Female	Han
Yan San	岩三	Male	Blang
Luo Zhengfu	罗正富	Male	Yi
Luo Bihui	罗笔晖	Female	Han
Luo Chongmin	罗崇敏	Male	Han
He Jichun	和继春	Female	Pumi
Yue Yuesheng	岳跃生	Male	Han
Zhou Zhenhai	周振海	Male	Han
Meng Biguang	孟必光	Male	Dai
Meng Sutie	孟苏铁	Male	Han
Zhao Gang	赵刚	Male	Yi
Zhao Jian	赵坚	Female	Dai
Cha Zhongwang	茶忠旺	Male	Yi
Hu Kangsheng	胡康生	Male	Han
Duan Xingxiang	段兴祥	Male	Han
Hou Xinhua	侯新华	Male	Lisu
Qin Guangrong	秦光荣	Male	Han
Yuan Si	袁驷	Male	Han
Yan Youqiong	晏友琼	Female	Han
Feng Liqiu	俸力秋	Female	Dai
Xu Xiangdong	徐向东	Male	Va
Xu Rongkai	徐荣凯	Male	Han
Gao Jinsong	高劲松	Male	Han
Gao Hong	高洪	Male	Baii
Tang Shihua	唐世华	Male	Lisu
Huang Wenwu	黄文武	Male	Zhuang
Shang Xiaoyun	商小云	Male	Han
Dong Hua	董华	Male	Han
Zeng Liyan	曾立岩	Male	Han
Guan Guofang	管国芳	Female	Dai
Liao Zelong	廖泽龙	Male	Han
Liao Xiaojun	廖晓军	Male	Hanv
=== Tibet === (20 seats)
Name	Chinese name	Gender	Ethnic
Ding Zhongli	丁仲礼	Male	Han
Wang Huning	王沪宁	Male	Han
Kang Jinzhong	亢进忠	Male	Han
Baidan Cuomu	白丹措姆	Female	Monba
Padma Choling	白玛赤林	Male	Tibetan
Dawa Tashi	达娃扎西	Male	Tibetan
Legqog	列确	Male	Tibetan
Qiangba Puncog	向巴平措	Male	Tibetan
Doje Cedruk	多吉次珠	Male	Tibetan
Sezhu	色珠	Female	Tibetan
Ngawang	阿旺	Male	Tibetan
Chen Quanguo	陈全国	Male	Han
Zhao He	赵合	Male	Han
Gaisang Zhoigar	格桑卓嘎	Female	Tibetan
Xiao Hong	晓红	Female	Lhoba
Sazhen	萨珍	Female	Tibetan
Oiser	维色	Male	Tibetan
Pu Bu	普布	Male	Tibetan
Xinza Dainzin Quzhag	新杂·单增曲扎	Male	Tibetan
Garma Rinchen	嘎玛仁青	Male	Tibetan
=== Shaanxi === (64 seats)
Name	Chinese name	Gender	Ethnic
Yu Wen	于文	Female	Han
Qian Junchang	千军昌	Male	Han
Make Ning	马克宁	Female	Han
Wang Hui	王卉	Female	Han
Wang Zhaoguo	王兆国	Male	Han
Wang Hong	王宏	Male	Han
Wang Xia	王侠	Female	Han
Wang Qian	王茜	Female	Han
Wang Yongchao	王勇超	Male	Han
Wang Daofu	王道富	Male	Han
Wang Lanming	王澜明	Male	Han
Hu Sishe	户思社	Male	Han
Shi Guilu	史贵禄	Male	Han
Bai Aying	白阿莹	Male	Han
Feng Yueju	冯月菊	Female	Han
Feng Junping	冯钧平	Male	Hui
Feng Xinzhu	冯新柱	Male	Han
Hua Wei	华炜	Male	Han
Liu Huilian	刘会莲	Female	Han
Liu Jianshen	刘建申	Male	Han
Liu Jianming	刘建明	Male	Han
Liu Guisheng	刘贵生	Male	Han
An Dong	安东	Male	Han
Sun Yuxi	孙玉玺	Male	Han
Li Dakai	李大开	Male	Han
Li Jinzhu	李金柱	Male	Han
Li Pengde	李朋德	Male	Han
Li Heiji	李黑记	Male	Han
Yang Fengqi	杨丰岐	Male	Han
Yang Yongmao	杨永茂	Male	Han
Yang Guanjun	杨冠军	Male	Hui
He Xiaohong	何晓红	Female	Han
Zhang Guangqiang	张光强	Male	Han
Zhang Jinqiu	张锦秋	Female	Han
Chen Fenxin	陈分新	Male	Han
Chen Baogen	陈宝根	Male	Han
Chen Qiang	陈强	Male	Han
Zhou Weijian	周卫健	Female	Han
Zheng Fenli	郑粉莉	Female	Han
Qu Yajun	屈雅君	Female	Han
Zhao Zhengyong	赵正永	Male	Han
Zhao Yueji	赵乐际	Male	Han
Zhao Jiping	赵季平	Male	Han
Zhao Chao	赵超	Male	Han
Zhao Xilin	赵喜林	Female	Han
Hao Yue	郝跃	Male	Han
Hu Weiping	胡卫平	Male	Han
Hu Taiping	胡太平	Male	Han
Xiang Libin	相里斌	Male	Han
Zhu Zuoli	祝作利	Male	Han
Jia Guiwu	贾桂武	Male	Han
Jia Fuqing	贾福清	Male	Han
Xu Mingzheng	徐明正	Male	Han
Huang He	黄河	Male	Han
Huang Teng	黄藤	Male	Han
Cao Jianguo	曹建国	Male	Han
Cao Lili	曹莉莉	Female	Han
Cui Lintao	崔林涛	Male	Han
Liang Ping	梁平	Male	Han
Jiang Zhuangde	蒋庄德	Male	Han
Xie Donggang	谢东钢	Male	Han
Xie Jingrong	谢经荣	Male	Han
Tan Yonghua	谭永华	Male	Han
Xiong Qunli	熊群力	Male	Han
=== Gansu === (45 seats)
Name	Chinese name	Gender	Ethnic
Yu Hongzhi	于洪志	Female	Han
Ma Shaomin	马少敏	Female	Hui
Ma Guangming	马光明	Male	Hui
Ma Hanlan	马含岚	Female	Dongxiang
Ma Xiaoqin	马晓琴	Female	Bonon
Wang Sanyun	王三运	Male	Han
Wang Yi	王义	Male	Han
Wang Qingfen	王庆粉	Female	Han
Wang Xiyu	王玺玉	Male	Han
Zuo Zongguo	左宗国	Male	Han
Feng Jianshen	冯健身	Male	Han
Feng Hairong	冯海荣	Female	Han
Bi Hongzhen	毕红珍	Female	Hui
Qiao Hanrong	乔汉荣	Male	Han
Liu Dajiang	刘大江	Male	Han
Liu Weiping	刘伟平	Male	Han
Liu Ji	刘基	Male	Han
Jiang Yiman	江亦曼	Female	Han
An Guofeng	安国锋	Male	Yugur
Xu Wenhai	许文海	Male	Han
Su Guanglin	苏广林	Male	Hui
Su Suipei	苏岁佩	Female	Han
Li Ningping	李宁平	Male	Han
Li Jianhua	李建华	Male	Han
Yang Zhiqiang	杨志强	Male	Han
Wu Yuntian	吴云天	Male	Han
Zhang Jinliang	张津梁	Male	Han
Zhang Xusheng	张绪胜	Male	Han
Zhang Jinghui	张景辉	Male	Han
Lu Hao	陆浩	Male	Han
Chen Jianhua	陈建华	Male	Han
Chen Geng	陈耕	Male	Han
Wu Weidong	武卫东	Male	Han
Zhou Duoming	周多明	Male	Han
Zhou Xuhong	周绪红	Male	Han
Hu Hao	胡浩	Male	Han
Luosang Lingzhi Duojie	洛桑灵智多杰	Male	Tibetan
Jia Yingchun	贾迎春	Female	Han
Guo Yufen	郭玉芬	Female	Han
Liang Mingyuan	梁明远	Male	Tibetan
Yu Baocai	喻宝才	Male	Han
Cheng Youqing	程有清	Male	Han
Wen Jiabao	温家宝	Male	Han
Yu Haiyan	虞海燕	Male	Han
Jamyang Lobsang Jigme Thubten Chökyi Nyima	嘉木样·洛桑久美·图丹却吉尼玛	Male	Tibetan
=== Qinghai === (21 seats)
Name	Chinese name	Gender	Ethnic
Ma Fuhai	马福海	Male	Hui
Wang Yuhu	王玉虎	Male	Tibetan
Mao Xiaobing	毛小兵	Male	Han
Zhu Mingrui	朱明瑞	Male	Han
Qiao Zhengxiao	乔正孝	Male	Tu
Ren Maodong	任茂东	Male	Han
Hua Fuzhou	华福周	Female	Han
Liu Ziqiang	刘自强	Male	Han
Yan Jinhai	严金海	Male	Tibetan
Li Chengbao	李承宝	Male	Han
Song Xiuyan	宋秀岩	Female	Han
Zhang Shoucheng	张守成	Female	Mongol
Bai Xiuhua	拜秀花	Female	Hui
Luo Yulin	骆玉林	Male	Han
Luo Huining	骆惠宁	Male	Han
Nuo Erde	诺尔德	Male	Tibetan
Niang Maoxian	娘毛先	Female	Tibetan
Jiang Shusheng	蒋树声	Male	Han
Han Yongdong	韩永东	Male	Salar
Cheng Su	程苏	Female	Han
Qiang Wei	强卫	Male	Han
=== Ningxia === (19 seats)
Name	Chinese name	Gender	Ethnic
Ma Qizhi	马启智	Male	Hui
Ma Changyi	马昌裔	Male	Hui
Ma Ruiwen	马瑞文	Male	Hui
Wang Zhengwei	王正伟	Male	Hui
Wang Qingxi	王庆喜	Male	Han
Wang Heshan	王和山	Male	Han
Wang Rugui	王儒贵	Male	Hui
Bai Shangcheng	白尚成	Male	Hui
Lü Xinping	吕新萍	Female	Han
Wu Yucai	吴玉才	Male	Hui
Wu Haiying	吴海鹰	Female	Hui
Wangs Hucheng	汪恕诚	Male	Han
Zhang Zuoli	张作理	Male	Han
Zhang Yi	张毅	Male	Han
Chen Ximing	陈希明	Female	Han
Chen Changzhi	陈昌智	Male	Han
Chen Jianguo	陈建国	Male	Han
Yuan Jinlin	袁进琳	Male	Han
Xu Liqun	徐力群	Male	Han
=== Xinjiang === (61 seats)
Name	Chinese name	Gender	Ethnic
Maning Zainilei	马宁·再尼勒	Male	Kazakh
Ma Dengfeng	马登峰	Male	Hui
Wang Lequan	王乐泉	Male	Han
Juaiti Yiming	巨艾提·伊明	Male	Uyghur
Niu Ruji	牛汝极	Male	Han
Maoken Saiyitihamuzha	毛肯·赛衣提哈木扎	Male	Kazakh
Arken Imirbaki	艾力更·依明巴海	Male	Uyghur
Ainiwa'er Yiming	艾尼瓦尔·伊明	Male	Uyghur
Aikebai'er·wufu'er	艾克拜尔·吾甫尔	Male	Uyghur
Tian Wen	田文	Female	Han
Shi Shaolin	史少林	Male	Han
Shi Jianyong	史建勇	Male	Mongol
Ismail Tiliwaldi	司马义·铁力瓦尔地	Male	Uyghur
Ji'erla Yishamuding	吉尔拉·衣沙木丁	Male	Uyghur
Dilimaolati Yibulayin	地力毛拉提·依布拉音	Male	Tajik
Dalielihan Mamihan	达列力汗·马米汗	Male	Kazak
Roza Ismail	肉孜·司马义	Male	Uyghur
Ren Jidong	任积东	Male	Han
Liu Zhi	刘志	Male	Han
Yan Fenxin	闫汾新	Male	Han
Sun Changhua	孙昌华	Male	Han
Maliya Mati	玛丽亚·马提	Female	Kirgiz
Mayinu'er Niyazi	玛依努尔·尼亚孜	Female	Uyghur
Su Shengxin	苏胜新	Male	Han
Li Zhimin	李志敏	Female	Han
Li Xinming	李新明	Male	Han
Yang Gang	杨刚	Male	Han
Yang Qin	杨琴	Female	Hui
Yang Huizhu	杨慧珠	Female	Han
Chen Yan	沈岩	Male	Han
Zhang Handong	张汉东	Male	Han
Zhang Chunxian	张春贤	Male	Han
Zhang Xin	张新	Male	Han
Abudula Abasi	阿不都拉·阿巴斯	Male	Tatar
Abudoureheman Yasheng	阿不都热合曼·亚生	Male	Uyghur
Abudoureyimu Amiti	阿不都热依木·阿米提	Male	Uyghur
Abudili'aizezi Maitinasi'er	阿布地力艾则孜·买提那斯尔	Male	Uyghur
Adili Wuxiu'er	阿迪力·吾休尔	Male	Uyghur
Amanbayi Dawuti	阿曼把依·达吾提	Male	Kazakh
Asiha'er·tu'erxun	阿斯哈尔·吐尔逊	Male	Uyghur
Nur Bekri	努尔·白克力	Male	Uyghur
Nu'erla Ayoufu	努尔拉·阿尤甫	Male	Uyghur
Nusilaiti Wajiding	努斯来提·瓦吉丁	Male	Uyghur
Raisa Aleksandrovna	拉依萨·阿列克桑德洛娜	Female	Russian
Dilina'er·abudula	迪丽娜尔·阿不都拉	Female	Uyghur
Zhou Shengtao	周声涛	Male	Han
Juma Tayir	居马·塔依尔	Male	Uyghur
Zhao Xia	赵峡	Male	Han
Halida Nu'ermaimaiti	哈丽妲·努尔买买提	Female	Uzbek
Hou Xiaoqin	侯小勤	Male	Han
Zulfiya Abdiqadir	祖丽菲娅·阿不都卡德尔	Female	Uyghur
Yuan Ze	袁泽	Male	Han
Rena Kasimu	热娜·卡斯木聂卫国	Female	Uyghur
Ni Eweiguo	夏热娃娜·阿布都克依木	Male	Han
Li Zhi	栗智	Male	Han
Sharewana Abduqeyyum	夏热娃娜·阿布都克依木	Female	Uyghur
Cao Peixi	曹培玺	Male	Han
Shohrat Zakir	雪克来提·扎克尔	Male	Uyghur
Sihan Tuludaheng	斯汗·吐鲁达恒	Female	Kazakh
Cheng Zhenshan	程振山	Male	Han
Fu Chunli	富春丽	Female	Xibe
=== Hong Kong === (36 seats)
Name	Chinese name	Gender	Ethnic
Ma Fung-kwok	马逢国	Male	Han
Ma Ho-fai	马豪辉	Male	Han
Wang Rudeng	王如登	Male	Han
Wilfred Wong Ying-wai	王英伟	Male	Han
Peter Wong Man-kong	王敏刚	Male	Han
Lo Sui-on	卢瑞安	Male	Han
Ip Kwok-him	叶国谦	Male	Han
Michael Tien Puk-sun	田北辰	Male	Han
Laura Cha May-lung	史美伦	Female	Han
Lau Pui-king	刘佩琼	Female	Han
Sophie Leung Lau Yau-fun	梁刘柔芬	Female	Han
Miriam Lau Kin-yee	刘健仪	Female	Han
Joseph Lee Chung-tak	李宗德	Male	Han
Yeung Yiu-chung	杨耀忠	Male	Han
Ng Leung-sing	吴亮星	Male	Han
Ng Ching-fai	吴清辉	Male	Han
Raymond Ho Chung-tai	何钟泰	Male	Han
Bernard Charnwut Chan Chi-sze	陈智思	Male	Han
Rita Fan Hsu Lai-tai	范徐丽泰	Female	Han
Dennis Lam Shun-chiu	林顺潮	Male	Han
Fanny Law Fan Chiu-fun	罗范椒芬	Female	Han
Lo Suk-ching	罗叔清	Male	Han
Cheng Yiu-tong	郑耀棠	Male	Han
Fei Fih	费斐	Female	Han
Yuen Mo	袁武	Male	Han
Ko Po-ling	高宝龄	Female	Han
Wong Yuk-shan	黄玉山	Male	Han
Wong Kwok-kin	黄国健	Male	Han
Tso Wung-wai	曹宏威	Male	Han
Leung Ping-chung	梁秉中	Male	Han
Carson Wen Ka-shuen	温嘉旋	Male	Han
Tim Lui Tim-leung	雷添良	Male	Han
Choy So-yuk	蔡素玉	Female	Han
Martin Liao Cheung-kong	廖长江	Male	Han
Maria Tam Wai-chu	谭惠珠	Female	Han
Ian Fok Tsun-wan	霍震寰	Male	Han
=== Macau === (12 seats)
Name	Chinese name	Gender	Ethnic
Lao Ngai Leong	刘艺良	Male	Han
Lau Cheok Va	刘焯华	Male	Han
Lei Pui Lam	李沛霖	Male	Han
Lo Po	陆波	Male	Han
Chio Ngan Ieng	招银英	Female	Han
Ling Hsião Yun (Paula)	林笑云	Female	Han
Io Hong Meng	姚鸿明	Male	Han
Ho Iat Seng	贺一诚	Male	Han
Kou Hoi In	高开贤	Male	Han
Chui Sai Peng (Jose)	崔世平	Male	Han
Leong Iok Wa	梁玉华	Female	Han
Leong Vai Tac	梁维特	Male	Han
=== Taiwan === (13 seats)
Name	Chinese name	Gender	Ethnic
Kong Lingzhi	孔令智	Male	Han
Zhu Taiqing	朱台青	Male	Han
Wu Qiongkai	吴琼开	Male	Han
He Daxin	何大欣	Male	Han
Zhang Xiong	张雄	Male	Han
Chen Yunying	陈云英	Female	Han
Chen Jun	陈军	Female	Gaoshan (Note: The People's Republic of China classifies all Taiwanese indigenous peoples as a single ethnicity called Gaoshan. Under the more detailed ethnic classification of Taiwanese indigenous peoples used by the Republic of China (which governs Taiwan in practice), Chen Jun is Amis.)
Chen Qinghai	陈清海	Male	Han
Chen Weiwen	陈蔚文	Male	Han
Chen Yaozhong	陈耀中	Male	Han
Hu Youqing	胡有清	Male	Han
Liang Guoyang	梁国扬	Male	Han
Wei Lihui	魏丽惠	Female	Han
=== PLA === (265 seats)
Name	Chinese name	Gender	Ethnic
Ding Laihang	丁来杭	Male	Han
Ding Mingde	丁明德	Male	Han
Ding Xiaobing	丁晓兵	Male	Han
Ding Jiye	丁继业	Male	Han
Xi Hailing	习海玲	Female	Han
Ma Weiming	马伟明	Male	Han
Ma Jianguo	马建国	Male	Han
Ma Xiangsheng	马湘生	Male	Han
Ma Ruiqi	马瑞奇	Male	Han
Wang Jiurong	王久荣	Male	Han
Wang Shengshan	王升山	Male	Han
Wang Wenrong	王文荣	Male	Han
Wang Shiping	王世平	Male	Han
Wang Ping	王平	Male	Han
Wang Xixin	王西欣	Male	Han
Wang Jianmin (Lanzhou MR)	王建民	Male	Han
Wang Jianmin (Chengdu MR)	王建民	Male	Han
Wang Jianjun	王建俊	Male	Han
Wang Hongyao	王洪尧	Male	Han
Wang Guanzhong	王冠中	Male	Han
Wang Hewen	王贺文	Male	Han
Wang Yong	王勇	Male	Manchu
Wang Li	王莉	Female	Han
Wang Xiaolong	王晓龙	Male	Han
Wang Xiaodong	王晓东	Male	Manchu
Wang Jitang	王继堂	Male	Han
Wang Mengyun	王梦云	Male	Han
Wang Qingbao	王清葆	Male	Han
Wang Weishan	王维山	Male	Han
Wang Weijun	王维俊	Female	Han
Wang Sentai	王森泰	Male	Han
Wang Hui	王辉	Male	Han
Wang Qian	王谦	Male	Han
Wang Dengping	王登平	Male	Han
Wang Fushan	王福山	Male	Han
You Haitao	尤海涛	Male	Han
Ju Xiaocheng	巨孝成	Male	Han
Niu Hongguang	牛红光	Male	Han
Deng Wei	邓伟	Female	Manchu
Tian Wei	田伟	Male	Tujia
Ran Chongwei	冉崇伟	Male	Han
Bai Yonghui	白永会	Male	Han
Bai Zixing	白自兴	Male	Han
Cong Rigang	丛日刚	Male	Han
Feng Zhengjie	冯政杰	Male	Han
Mian Fucheng	芇福成	Male	Han
Lü Jun	吕峻	Male	Naxi
Lü Jihong	吕继宏	Male	Han
Zhu Wenyu	朱文玉	Male	Han
Zhu Wenquan	朱文泉	Male	Han
Zhu Qi	朱启	Male	Han
Zhu Hongda	朱洪达	Male	Han
Zhu Qingyi	朱清益	Male	Han
Zhu Jinlin	朱锦林	Male	Han
Zhu Shuguang	朱曙光	Male	Han
Xiang Nanlin	向南林	Male	Han
Wu Huayang	邬华扬	Male	Han
Liu Jukui	刘巨魁	Male	Han
Liu Dongdong	刘冬冬	Male	Han
Liu Yongzhi	刘永治	Male	Han
Liu Yahong	刘亚红	Male	Han
Liu Weiwei	刘伟伟	Male	Han
Liu Jilin	刘纪林	Male	Han
Liu Jichen	刘际琛	Male	Han
Liu Zhongxing	刘忠兴	Male	Han
Liu Xin	刘欣	Male	Han
Liu Xueyun	刘学云	Male	Han
Liu Sheng	刘胜	Male	Han
Liu Yong	刘勇	Male	Han
Liu Zhenqi	刘振起	Male	Han
Liu Xiaokun	刘晓琨	Male	Han
Liu Xiaocui	刘晓翠	Female	Han
Liu Lianhua	刘联华	Male	Han
Liu Dingxing	刘鼎兴	Male	Han
Liu Bin	刘斌	Male	Han
Liu Lei	刘雷	Male	Han
Liu Zhenwu	刘镇武	Male	Han
Qi Sanping	齐三平	Male	Han
Guan Kai	关凯	Male	Han
Jiang Jianzeng	江建曾	Male	Han
Jiangyong Xirao	江勇西绕	Male	Tibetan
Tang Ziyue	汤子跃	Male	Han
Xu Qiliang	许其亮	Male	Han
Ruan Zhibai	阮志柏	Male	Han
Sun Dafa	孙大发	Male	Han
Sun Zhenglu	孙正禄	Male	Han
Sun Zhongtong	孙忠同	Male	Han
Rui Qingkai	芮清凯	Male	Han
Su Shuyan	苏书岩	Male	Han
Du Jianlin	杜建林	Male	Han
Li Xiaoying	李小鹰	Female	Han
Li Shaojun	李少军	Male	Han
Li Changshun	李长顺	Male	Han
Li Danyang	李丹阳	Female	Han
Li Danni	李丹妮	Female	Han
Li Yu	李玉	Male	Han
Li Benqi	李本琪	Male	Han
Li Lantian	李兰田	Male	Han
Li Guangjin	李光金	Male	Han
Li Qing'an	李庆安	Male	Han
Li Zuocheng	李作成	Male	Han
Li Xianfu	李贤福	Male	Miao
Li Guohui	李国辉	Male	Han
Li Chang	李昌	Male	Han
Li Zheng	李征	Male	Man
Li Jinshan	李金山	Male	Han
Li Xuewen	李学文	Male	Han
Li Xuezhong	李学忠	Male	Han
Li Xuezhi	李学智	Male	Han
Li Jianhua	李建华	Male	Han
Li Zhongmin	李钟敏	Male	Hui
Li Jun	李俊	Female	Han
Li Jinai	李继耐	Male	Han
Li Ganyuan	李乾元	Male	Han
Li Dianren	李殿仁	Male	Han
Yang Jigui	杨吉贵	Male	Han
Yang Zhiqi	杨志琦	Male	Han
Yang Guohai	杨国海	Male	Han
Yang Jian	杨剑	Male	Han
Yang Rongya	杨蓉娅	Female	Han
Yang Deqing	杨德清	Male	Han
Wu Shuangzhan	吴双战	Male	Han
Wu Shengli	吴胜利	Male	Han
He Xinying	何新瑛	Female	Han
Yu Peijun	余培军	Male	Han
Xin Rongguo	辛荣国	Male	Han
Wang Yu	汪玉	Male	Han
Wang Chaoqun	汪超群	Male	Han
Wang Rui	汪瑞	Female	Han
Song Qiwen	宋其文	Male	Han
Song Shanyu	宋善玉	Male	Han
Chi Wanchun	迟万春	Male	Han
Zhang Wentai	张文台	Male	Han
Zhang Shibo	张仕波	Male	Han
Zhang Xuncai	张训才	Male	Han
Zhang Huachen	张华臣	Male	Han
Zhang Xiaozhong	张孝忠	Male	Han
Zhang Wei	张苇	Male	Han
Zhang Yueyong	张岳永	Male	Han
Zhang Yulin	张育林	Male	Han
Zhang Xuefeng	张学锋	Male	Han
Zhang Baoshu	张宝书	Male	Han
Zhang Shiming	张诗明	Male	Han
Zhang Jianqi	张建启	Male	Han
Zhang Jiangfei	张豇菲	Male	Han
Zhang Lieying	张烈英	Male	Han
Zhang Ye	张烨	Male	Han
Zhang Jun	张骏	Male	Han
Zhang Rui	张瑞	Male	Han
Zhang Deshun	张德顺	Male	Han
Chen Erxi	陈二曦	Male	Han
Chen Xiaogong	陈小工	Male	Han
Chen Guangming	陈光明	Male	Han
Chen Xitao	陈希滔	Male	Han
Chen Lin	陈林	Male	Han
Chen Guotao	陈国韬	Male	Han
Chen Shuwei	陈树伟	Male	Han
Chen Bingde	陈炳德	Male	Han
Chen Zhangyuan	陈章元	Male	Han
Miao Hua	苗华	Male	Han
Yuan Shijun	苑世军	Male	Han
Fan Changmi	范长秘	Male	Han
Lin Guangfan	林广泛	Male	Han
Yue Huilai	岳惠来	Male	Han
Jin Mao	金矛	Male	Han
Zhou Xiaozhou	周小周	Male	Han
Zhou Liangzhu	周良柱	Male	Han
Zhou Bin	周斌	Male	Han
Zhou Ruihua	周瑞华	Male	Han
Zhou Bihua	周璧华	Female	Han
Zheng Shenxia	郑申侠	Male	Han
Zheng Chuanfu	郑传福	Male	Han
Zheng Xican	郑喜灿	Female	Han
Guanque Caidan	官却才旦	Male	Tibetan
Fang Fenghui	房峰辉	Male	Han
Zhao Keming	赵可铭	Male	Han
Zhao Gang	赵刚	Male	Han
Zhao Qibao	赵启宝	Male	Manchu
Zhao Xiaoming	赵晓明	Male	Han
Zhao Hui	赵辉	Male	Han
Zhao Xijun	赵锡君	Male	Han
Hu Xiutang	胡秀堂	Male	Han
Hu Yishu	胡宜树	Male	Han
Hu Yanlin	胡彦林	Male	Han
Jiang Jichu	姜吉初	Male	Han
Jiang Futang	姜福堂	Male	Han
Qin Weijiang	秦卫江	Male	Han
Qin Yu	秦雨	Male	Tujia
Gui Hengshan	桂恒山	Male	Han
Jia Zhengping	贾正平	Male	Han
Jia Yongsheng	贾永生	Male	Han
Jia Yanming	贾延明	Male	Han
Jia Xiaowei	贾晓炜	Male	Han
Xia Shifu	夏世富	Male	Han
Xia Guofu	夏国富	Male	Han
Gu Shoucheng	顾守成	Male	Han
Gu Bingyue	顾炳悦	Male	Manchu
Chai Shaoliang	柴绍良	Male	Han
Qian Nanzhong	钱南忠	Male	Han
Xu Caihou	徐才厚	Male	Han
Xu Xiaoyan	徐小岩	Male	Han
Xu Shuxiong	徐树雄	Male	Han
Xu Hongmeng	徐洪猛	Male	Han
Xu Genchu	徐根初	Male	Han
Xu Dexue	徐德学	Male	Han
Xu Lei	徐蕾	Female	Han
Gao Fenglou	高凤楼	Male	Han
Gao Shouwei	高守维	Male	Han
Guo Shuhong	郭书红	Male	Han
Guo Boxiong	郭伯雄	Male	Han
Tang Wanlin	唐万林	Male	Mongol
Tang Tianbiao	唐天标	Male	Han
Tang Taiping	唐太平	Male	Han
Tang Guoqing	唐国庆	Male	Han
Tan Wenhu	谈文虎	Male	Han
Huang Xiaojuan	黄晓娟	Female	Han
Huang Xianzhong	黄献中	Male	Han
Huang Jiaxiang	黄嘉祥	Male	Han
Cao Dongchen	曹东沈	Male	Han
Cao Guoqing	曹国庆	Male	Han
Cao Qing	曹清	Male	Han
Qi Jianguo	戚建国	Male	Han
Chang Wanquan	常万全	Male	Han
Cui Yuling	崔玉玲	Female	Han
Cui Jinglong	崔景龙	Male	Han
Fu Tinggui	符廷贵	Male	Han
Yan Hongzhi	阎红志	Male	Han
Yan Baojian	阎保健	Male	Han
Liang Guanglie	梁光烈	Male	Han
Liang Xiaojing	梁晓婧	Female	Han
Kou Tie	寇铁	Male	Han
Sui Mingtai	隋明太	Male	Han
Peng Xiaofeng	彭小枫	Male	Han
Ge Zhenfeng	葛振峰	Male	Han
Dong Deyuan	董德元	Male	Han
Jiang Chong'an	蒋崇安	Male	Han
Han Yanlin	韩延林	Male	Han
Su Yongping	粟永萍	Female	Han
Su Rongsheng	粟戎生	Male	Dong
Yu Linxiang	喻林祥	Male	Han
Ji Shaoying	嵇绍莹	Male	Han
Cheng Xiaojian	程晓健	Female	Han
Jiao Honghui	焦红辉	Male	Han
Shu Yutai	舒玉泰	Male	Han
Zeng Zhanping	曾占平	Male	Han
Zeng Qingzhu	曾庆祝	Male	Han
Zeng Manjun	曾满军	Male	Han
Xie Jianhua	谢建华	Male	Han
Chu Hongyan	楚鸿彦	Male	Han
Qiu Shanshan	裘山山	Female	Han
Lei Mingqiu	雷鸣球	Male	Han
Jian Shilong	简仕龙	Male	Han
Bao Juntao	鲍俊涛	Male	Han
Jing Zhiyuan	靖志远	Male	Han
Pei Huailiang	裴怀亮	Male	Han
Liao Bingsheng	廖炳生	Male	Han
Liao Xilong	廖锡龙	Male	Han
Sailimujiang Saidula	赛里木江·赛都拉	Male	Uyghur
Tan Jing	谭晶	Female	Han
Fan Daiming	樊代明	Male	Han
Yan Jixiong	颜纪雄	Male	Han
Mu Zhenhe	穆振河	Male	Han
Wei Dongpu	魏东普	Male	Han
Wei Gang	魏钢	Male	Han

== See also ==
- List of members of the National People's Congress
