= Weining =

Weining may refer to:

- Li Weining (born 1959), acting mayor of the city of Jiaxing, Zhejiang Province, China
- Lin Weining (born 1979), female Chinese weightlifter and Olympic gold medalist
- Frederick Weining (born 1965), role-playing game designer
- Weining Yi Hui and Miao Autonomous County, Guizhou, China
