= Zhu Wenchen =

Chinese billionaire

Zhu Wenchen is a Chinese billionaire who founded and chairs Furen Phramaceutical, which he acquired as Shanghai Minfeng Industrial Group in 2006. He also owns a liquor firm, Songhe Liquor. He is known for being rather publicity-shy.

In 2020, the Chinese authorities looked into Furen's financials and found the group guilty of falsifying its performance for years. Zhu Wenchen was held responsible and banned from the securities market for 10 years.
