= Zhu Youlin =

Chinese academic and politician

Zhu Youlin (朱友林, born 1962) is a Chinese academic and politician. He is a vice-president of Nanchang University, as well as a representative for Jiangxi province in the 11th National People's Congress.
