= Fu Qiping =

Chinese politician

Fu Qiping is a leader and environmentalist who changed the structure of the economy of a village named Tengtou in China. He received Asia's most prestigious award, the Ramon Magsaysay Award, for his work.
