= Liu Zhongtian =

Liu Zhongtian 劉忠田
- Born: 1964 (age 61–62); Liaoyang, China
- Citizenship: China; Malta
- Education: Diploma in Administrative Management, Liaoning Radio and TV University
- Occupation: Businessman
- Known for: Founder, China Zhongwang Holdings
- Board member of: All-China Federation of Industry & Commerce (executive committee member); Liaoning Federation of Industry & Commerce (vice chairman)
- Spouse: married

Liu Zhongtian (Chinese: 劉忠田) (born 1964) is a Chinese-Maltese billionaire businessman, and the founder of China Zhongwang Holdings Limited (HKEx: 01333), the world's second largest industrial aluminum extrusion company.

== Career ==
Liu founded China Zhongwang in 1993, and was both the chairman and the president. He stepped down as president in March 2016, but remained as chairman until November 2017. Prior to China Zhongwang Holdings, Zhongtian was the founder and chairman of Liaoyang Factory, Futian Chemical, Hong Cheng and Liaoning Cheng Cheng Plastics.

In 2021, the US authorities indicted six of his companies involved in a $1.8 billion tariff-evasion scheme. Aluminum extrusions were disguised as pallets to avoid anti-dumping duties imposed in 2011 and stockpiled in several warehouses in Southern California. He was also trialed for faking sales of his aluminum through a shell company of his. His group was fined $1.8 billion, and declared bankruptcy in 2022. It was revealed that the group had essentially grown through debt-fueled acquisitions.

== Personal life ==
He is married and lives in Liaoyang, China.

Liu has purchased citizenship of Malta.
