= Zhu Haowen =

Chinese politician

Zhu Haowen (born February 1967) is a Chinese politician. He was the mayor of Qinhuangdao, Hebei, before being transferred to become secretary-general of the Hebei provincial government.

== Life ==
Zhu Haowen joined the Chinese Communist Party in December 1986. In July 1989 he graduated from the Nankai University Management School and began his career at the General Office of the State Planning Commission.
