= Cai Zongze =

Chinese politician (born 1951)

Cai Zongze (Chinese: 蔡宗泽; born 1951) is a Chinese politician. He has served as Mayor of Shantou, Guangdong province since 2007.
