= Chen Sixi =

Chinese politician

Chen Sixi (Chinese: 陈斯喜; pinyin: Chén Sīxǐ; born February 1958) is a Chinese politician.

== Biography ==
Chen was born in Datian County, Fujian in 1958. He graduated from Beijing University in 1984.

Chen was elected as the member of the NPC Standing Committee at the 11th National People's Congress in 2008, and was appointed as the Vice Chairman of the Internal and Judicial Affairs Committee.
