= Zhou Jian =

Zhou Jian, may refer to:

- Jian Zhou (1957–1999), Chinese virologist and cancer researcher
- Zhou Jian (diplomat) (born 1968), Chinese diplomat, ambassador of China to Qatar
