= Li Weining =

Chinese politician

Li Weining (Chinese: 李卫宁; pinyin: Lǐ Wèiníng; born October 1959) is currently acting mayor of Jiaxing, Zhejiang Province of China.

He is a member of Chinese Communist Party, and became acting mayor since September 2007.
