= Jiangsu Provincial Committee of the Chinese People's Political Consultative Conference =

Jiangsu Provincial Committee of the Chinese People's Political Consultative Conference 中国人民政治协商会议江苏省委员会
- 13th
- Emblem of the Chinese People's Political Consultative Conference

Type
- Type: United front organ Constitutional convention (Historical); Legislature (Historical) of Chinese People's Political Consultative Conference

History
- Founded: April 1955; 71 years ago
- Preceded by: JiangsuProvincial People's Congress Consultative Committee

Leadership
- Chairperson: Zhang Yizhen

Website
- www.jszx.gov.cn/index.html

Chinese name
- Simplified Chinese: 中国人民政治协商会议江苏省委员会
- Traditional Chinese: 中國人民政治協商會議江蘇省委員會
Transcriptions
Standard Mandarin
- Hanyu Pinyin: Zhōngguó Rénmín Zhèngzhì Xiéshāng Huìyì Jiāngsūshěng Wěiyuánhuì

Abbreviation
- Simplified Chinese: 江苏省政协
- Traditional Chinese: 江苏省政協
- Literal meaning: CPPCC JiangsuProvincial Committee
Transcriptions
Standard Mandarin
- Hanyu Pinyin: Jiāngsūshěng Zhèngxié

The Jiangsu Provincial Committee of the Chinese People's Political Consultative Conference (Chinese: 中国人民政治协商会议江苏省委员会) is the advisory body and a local organization of the Chinese People's Political Consultative Conference in Jiangsu, China. It is supervised and directed by the Jiangsu Provincial Committee of the Chinese Communist Party.

== History ==
The Jiangsu Provincial Committee of the Chinese People's Political Consultative Conference traces its origins to the Jiangsu Provincial People's Congress Consultative Committee (江苏省各界人民代表会议协商委员会), founded in 1949.

=== Anti-corruption campaign ===
On 20 May 2024, vice chairperson Wang Hao was put under investigation for alleged "serious violations of discipline and laws" by the Central Commission for Discipline Inspection (CCDI), the party's internal disciplinary body, and the National Supervisory Commission, the highest anti-corruption agency of China.

== Term ==
=== 1st ===
- Term: April 1955 - December 1959
- Chairperson: Jiang Weiqing
- Vice Chairpersons: Chen Guang, Leng Yu, Pan Shu, Li Mingyang, Chen Heqin, Gong Weizhen, Xu Jiatun, Qian Sunqing, Ren Chonggao, Li Leping (March 1956 - ), Lu Xiaobo (March 1956 - )

=== 2nd ===
- Term: December 1959 - September 1964
- Chairperson: Jiang Weiqing
- Vice Chairpersons: Chen Guang, Peng Chong, Li Leping, Chen Heqin, Gong Weizhen, Lu Xiaobo, Ren Chonggao, Gao Yihan, Yang Tingbao, Zhang Guangzhong (June 1962 - )

=== 3rd ===
- Term: September 1964 - December 1977
- Chairperson: Jiang Weiqing
- Vice Chairpersons: Chen Guang, Peng Chong, Li Leping, Chen Heqin, Gong Weizhen, Lu Xiaobo, Ren Chonggao, Gao Yihan, Yang Tingbao, Zhang Guangzhong

=== 4th ===
- Term: December 1977 - April 1983
- Chairperson: Xu Jiatun → Hui Yuyu (August 1979 - January 1980) → Bao Houchang (January 1980 - )
- Vice Chairpersons: Liu Shunyuan, Gong Weizhen, Zhang Guangzhong, Zhang Qilong, Li Shiying, Guan Wenwei, Yang Tingbao, Wu Yifang, Liu Guojun, Chen Heqin, Zeng Ruqing, Bao Houchang, Liu Shuxun, Chen Zhongfan, Hua Chengyi, Wang Zhaoquan, Liao Yunze, Ding Guangxun, Wei Yongyi (August 1979 - ), Zhu Hui (August 1979 - ), Liu Yubiao (August 1979 - ), Chen Yusheng (August 1979 - ), Ye Xuchao (August 1979 - ), Zhang Jingli (August 1979 - ), Huang Chaotian (January 1980 - ), Wu Jue (January 1980 - ), Zhou Wenzai (January 1980 - ), Chen Liping (January 1980 - ), Ai Mingshan (January 1980 - ), Gu Fusheng (January 1980 - ), Liu Lieren (January 1980 - ), Deng Haoming (January 1980 - ), Gao Juefu (January 1980 - ), Ouyang Huilin (January 1980 - )

=== 5th ===
- Term: April 1983 - January 1988
- Chairperson: Qian Zhonghan
- Vice Chairpersons: Wu Yifang, Wei Yongyi, Wang Zhaoquan, Liao Yunze, Ding Guangxun, Deng Haoming, Gao Juefu, Ouyang Huilin, Zuo Ai, Chen Minzhi, Chen Suiheng, Cheng Bingwen, Du Ziwei, Gong Weizhen (June 1984 - ), Luo Yunlai (May 1985 - ), Liu Xinghan (May 1985 - ), Chen Zonglie (April 1987 - )

=== 6th ===
- Term: January 1988 – January 1993
- Chairperson: Qian Zhonghan → Sun Han (April 24, 1989 - )
- Vice Chairpersons: Luo Yunlai, Ding Guangxun, Deng Haoming, Gao Juefu, Chen Zonglie, Chen Minzhi, Chen Suiheng, Cheng Bingwen, Liu Xinghan, Zhang Chenhuan, Hang Hongzhi

=== 7th ===
- Term: January 1993 – January 1998
- Chairperson: Sun Han
- Vice Chairpersons: Duan Xushen, Chen Suiheng, Zhang Chenhuan, Peng Sijun, Xu Yingrui, Han Wenzao, Tong Fu, Sha Renlin, Dai Shuhe, Lin Yuying (March 1997 - )

=== 8th ===
- Term: January 1998 – January 2003
- Chairperson: Cao Keming
- Vice Chairpersons: Hu Fuming, Duan Xushen, Han Wenzao, Hu Xujian, Zhou Sangyi, Lin Yuying, Min Naiben, Zhu Zhaoliang, Feng Jianqin, Chen Lingfu, Li Ren, Gu Hao (February 2001 –), Wu Donghua, Lin Xiangguo (February 2002 – )

=== 9th ===
- Term: January 2003 – January 2008
- Chairperson: Xu Zhonglin
- Vice Chairpersons: Wang Rongbing, Lin Yuying, Min Naiben, Zhu Zhaoliang, Feng Jianqin, Chen Lingfu, Li Ren, Wu Donghua, Lin Xiangguo, Lu Jun, Cao Weixing, Huang Yinhui, Sun Anhua (January 2005 - ), Ren Yanshen (January 2006 - ), Wu Ruilin (January 2006 - ), Zhou Min (January 2006 - ), Wu Jilie (January 2007 - ), Chen Baotian (January 2007 - )

=== 10th ===
- Term: January 2008 - January 2013
- Chairperson: Zhang Lianzhen
- Vice Chairpersons: Zhou Min, Zhang Jiuhan, Chen Lingfu, Cao Weixing, Huang Yinhui, Chen Baotian (resigned), Bao Guoxin, Cheng Chongqing, Zhou Jianmin, Fan Yanqing (by-election)
- Secretary-General: Liu Liren

=== 11th ===
- Term: January 2013 - January 2018
- Chairperson: Zhang Lianzhen → Jiang Dingzhi
- Vice Chairpersons: He Quan, Cheng Chongqing, Zhou Jianmin, Luo Yimin, Fan Yanqing, Xu Nanping, Zhu Xiaojin, Hong Huimin, Ma Jianguo, Yan Li (added)
- Secretary-General: Wu Hongbiao

=== 12th ===
- Term: January 2018 - January 2023
- Chairperson: Huang Lixin( - January 2022) → Zhang Yizhen (January 2022 - )
- Vice Chairpersons: Zhou Jianmin, Zhu Xiaojin, Hong Huimin, Ma Jianguo, Yan Li, Hu Jinbo ( - January 2020), Zhou Jiye, Wang Rongping, Hu Gang, Yao Xiaodong (January 2020 - ), Yang Yue (January 2022 - )
- Secretary-General: Yang Feng ( - January 2021) → Huang Jipeng (January 2021 - )

=== 13th ===
- Term: January 2023 – January 2028
- Chairperson: Zhang Yizhen
- Vice Chairpersons: Yang Yue, Hui Jianlin, Hong Huimin, Hu Gang, Yao Xiaodong, Zhang Lefu, Zhou Lan, Ma Yuqiang, Han Liming (January 2025 - ), Fang Wei (January 2025 - )
- Secretary-General: Zhu Jilu
