= Zhang Jinghua =

Chinese politician

- 张敬华

Deputy Party Secretary of Jiangsu
- In office 19 February 2021 – 19 November 2021
- Party Secretary: Lou Qinjian; Wu Zhenglong
- Preceded by: Ren Zhenhe
- Succeeded by: Zhang Yizhen

Party Secretary of Nanjing
- In office 17 July 2017 – 19 February 2021
- Deputy: Miao Ruilin; Lan Shaomin; Han Liming (mayor)
- Preceded by: Wu Zhenglong
- Succeeded by: Han Liming

Personal details
- Born: July 1962 (age 64) Tai County, Jiangsu, China
- Party: Chinese Communist Party
- Education: Nanjing University

Chinese name
- Simplified Chinese: 张敬华
- Traditional Chinese: 張敬華
Transcriptions
Standard Mandarin
- Hanyu Pinyin: Zhāng Jìnghuá

Zhang Jinghua (Chinese: 张敬华; born July 1962) is a former Chinese politician who served as Party Secretary of Nanjing from 2017 to 2021. Zhang also has a seat on the Jiangsu provincial Standing Committee. On November 15, 2017, Zhang met with former Israeli Ambassador to China, Matan Vilnai. On August 30, 2017, Zhang led a party and government delegation to investigate and observe the industrial development and technological innovation of Wuxi. In December 2016, while serving as Vice-Governor of Jiangsu, Zhang visited the Nanjing University of Chinese Medicine.

== Biography ==
Zhang was born in Tai County (now Jiangyan District), Jiangsu, in July 1962. In 1981, he was accepted to Nanjing University, majoring in economic management. He joined the Chinese Communist Party in June 1985. He worked in the Central People's Government after university in 1985.

In October 1987, he was assigned to his home-province Jiangsu, where he successively served as director of Jiangsu Provincial Department of Environmental Protection, mayor of Xuzhou, party secretary of Zhenjiang, secretary-general of Jiangsu, and vice governor of Jiangsu. On 17 July 2017, he was appointed party secretary of Nanjing, capital of Jiangsu. On October 24, he was chosen as an alternate member of the 19th Central Committee of the Chinese Communist Party. On February 19, 2021, he was made deputy party secretary of Jiangsu, and held that office until November 19, when he took office as deputy party branch secretary of the Jiangsu Provincial Committee of the Chinese People's Political Consultative Conference.

=== Downfall ===
On 1 December 2021, he has been placed under investigation for "serious violations of party discipline and laws" by the Central Commission for Discipline Inspection (CCDI), the party's internal disciplinary body, and the National Supervisory Commission, the highest anti-corruption agency of China. He was the fifth vice ministerial-level official in Nanjing to be targeted by anti-corruption authorities since 2008, after Wang Wulong, Yang Weize, Ji Jianye, and Miao Ruilin.

Government offices
| Preceded by Shi Zhenhua (史振华) | Director of Jiangsu Provincial Department of Environmental Protection; 2008–2009 | Succeeded by Chen Mengmeng |
| Preceded by Cao Xinping | Mayor of Xuzhou; 2009–2012 | Succeeded by Zhu Min (朱民) |
| Preceded by Mao Weiming | Secretary-General of Jiangsu Provincial People's Government; 2013–2016 | Succeeded by Wang Qi (王奇) |
| Preceded by Cao Weixing | Vice Governor of Jiangsu; 2016–2017 | Succeeded by Wang Jiang |
Party political offices
| Preceded by Xu Jinrong | Party Secretary of Zhenjiang; 2012–2013 | Succeeded by Yang Xingshi |
| Preceded by Wu Zhenglong | Party Secretary of Nanjing; 2017–2021 | Succeeded by Han Liming |
| Preceded by Ren Zhenhe | Deputy Party Secretary of Jiangsu; 2021 | Succeeded by Zhang Yizhen |
