= Wang Wulong =

Chinese politician

- 王武龙

Vice Chairman of Jiangsu Provincial People's Congress
- In office January 2003 – November 2006
- Chairman: Li Yuanchao; Wang Shouting

Chairman of Nanjing Municipal People's Congress
- In office January 1998 – January 2003
- Preceded by: Gu Hao
- Succeeded by: Li Yuanchao

Party Secretary of Nanjing
- In office June 1995 – October 2001
- Deputy: Wang Hongmin (mayor)
- Preceded by: Gu Hao
- Succeeded by: Li Yuanchao

Mayor of Nanjing
- In office June 1993 – December 1994
- Party Secretary: Gu Hao
- Preceded by: Wang Rongbing
- Succeeded by: Wang Hongmin

Mayor of Xuzhou
- In office April 1990 – May 1991
- Party Secretary: Zheng Liangyu; Li Yangzhen
- Preceded by: Xu Zhonglin
- Succeeded by: Wang Xilong

Personal details
- Born: February 1942 (age 84) Huai'an County, Jiangsu, Republic of China
- Party: Chinese Communist Party (1965–2006; expelled)
- Education: Nanjing Forestry University

Chinese name
- Simplified Chinese: 王武龙
- Traditional Chinese: 王武龍
Transcriptions
Standard Mandarin
- Hanyu Pinyin: Wáng Wǔlóng

Wang Wulong (Chinese: 王武龙; born February 1942) is a former Chinese politician who spent his entire career in east China's Jiangsu province. He was investigated by the party's anti-graft watchdog in October 2006. Previously he served as vice chairman of Jiangsu Provincial People's Congress. He served as chairman of Nanjing Municipal People's Congress and before that, party secretary and mayor of Nanjing. He was an alternate of the 15th Central Committee of the Chinese Communist Party. He was the first vice ministerial-level official in Nanjing to be targeted by anti-corruption authorities since 2008, before Yang Weize, Ji Jianye, Miao Ruilin, and Zhang Jinghua.

== Biography ==
Wang was born in Huai'an County (now Huai'an), Jiangsu, in February 1942. In 1962, he entered Nanjing Forestry University, majoring in chemical technology of forest products. He joined the Chinese Communist Party (CCP) in March 1965. After university, he met the Cultural Revolution and became a sent-down youth at Red Flag Farm in August 1968. In February 1970, he was assigned to Xuzhou Electrolytic Chemical Plant, where he worked for over seven years. He became deputy director of Xuzhou Chemical Industry Institute in August 1977, factory deputy director of Xuzhou Gas Factory in March 1980, and party secretary of Xuzhou Chemical Plant in May 1981.

He got involved in politics in March 1983, when he was appointed vice mayor of Xuzhou. In October 1989, he was named acting mayor, replacing Xu Zhonglin. He was installed as mayor in April 1990. In May 1991, he became deputy director of Jiangsu Provincial Planning and Economy Committee, rising to director the next year. He became mayor of Nanjing, capital of Jiangsu province, in March 1994, and then party secretary, the top political position in the city, beginning in June 1995. He concurrently served as chairman of Nanjing Municipal People's Congress since January 1998. During his tenure as mayor, he ordered relevant departments to cut down the street trees on the main roads of Nanjing in order to make the city brighter, which was opposed by the media and the Nanjing people jokingly called him "Mayor of Cutting Trees" (砍树市长). In January 2003, he took office as vice chairman of Jiangsu Provincial People's Congress.

=== Downfall ===
On 31 October 2006, he has been placed under investigation for "serious violations of discipline and accepting bribes" by the party's disciplinary body. His qualification for delegates to the 10th National People's Congress was terminated. Soon after, he was expelled from the Chinese Communist Party and dismissed from public office.

On 19 December 2007, he stood trial at the Intermediate People's Court of Hefei on charges of taking bribes. Prosecutors accused Wang of taking advantage of his different positions between 1995 and 2006 to seek profits for various companies and individuals in land development, in return for bribes paid in cash or gifts worth more than 6.8 million yuan (about $0.9 million) personally or through his family members.

On 31 January 2008, he was sentenced to death by the Intermediate People's Court of Hefei for bribery, suspended for two years, deprived him of political rights for life, and confiscated all his personal property.

Government offices
Preceded by Xu Zhonglin	Mayor of Xuzhou; 1990–1991	Succeeded by Wang Xilong
Preceded by Wang Rongbing	Mayor of Nanjing; 1993–1994	Succeeded by Wang Hongmin
Party political offices
Preceded by Gu Hao	Party Secretary of Nanjing; 1995–2001	Succeeded by Li Yuanchao
Assembly seats
Preceded by Gu Hao	Chairman of Nanjing Municipal People's Congress; 1998–2003	Succeeded by Li Yuanchao
