= Huang Lixin =

Chinese politician

- 黄莉新

Chairwoman of the Shanghai Municipal People's Congress
- Incumbent
- Assumed office 24 January 2024
- Preceded by: Dong Yunhu

Chairwoman of the Zhejiang Provincial Committee of the Chinese People's Political Consultative Conference
- In office January 2022 – December 2023
- Preceded by: Ge Huijun
- Succeeded by: Lian Yimin

Chairwoman of the Jiangsu Provincial Committee of the Chinese People's Political Consultative Conference
- In office January 2018 – January 2022
- Preceded by: Jiang Dingzhi
- Succeeded by: Zhang Yizhen

Deputy Party Secretary of Jiangsu
- In office July 2017 – March 2018
- Preceded by: Wu Zhenglong
- Succeeded by: Ren Zhenhe

Executive Vice Governor of Jiangsu
- In office October 2016 – January 2018
- Preceded by: Li Yunfeng
- Succeeded by: Fan Jinlong

Party Secretary of Nanjing
- In office January 25, 2015 – October 12, 2016
- Deputy: Miao Ruilin (Mayor)
- Preceded by: Yang Weize
- Succeeded by: Wu Zhenglong

Party Secretary of Wuxi
- In office December 2011 – January 2015
- Deputy: Wang Quan
- Preceded by: Mao Xiaoping
- Succeeded by: Li Xiaomin

Personal details
- Born: August 1962 (age 64) Suqian, Jiangsu, China
- Party: Chinese Communist Party
- Education: Yangzhou University; Nanjing University; Central Party School of the Chinese Communist Party

Chinese name
- Simplified Chinese: 黄莉新
- Traditional Chinese: 黃莉新
Transcriptions
Standard Mandarin
- Hanyu Pinyin: Huáng Lìxīn

Huang Lixin (Chinese: 黄莉新; born August 1962) is a Chinese politician currently serving as chairwoman of the Shanghai Municipal People's Congress. Previously she served as chairwoman of the Zhejiang Provincial Committee of the Chinese People's Political Consultative Conference, chairwoman of the Jiangsu Provincial Committee of the Chinese People's Political Consultative Conference. Huang has been dispatched successively to fill vacancies left by officials accused of corruption: first replacing Mao Xiaoping in Wuxi, then Yang Weize in Nanjing, then Li Yunfeng as executive vice governor, and Dong Yunhu in Shanghai. She is the first woman to serve as party chief of Nanjing in history.

Huang is an alternate of the 18th and 19th Central Committees of the Chinese Communist Party. She was a member of the 13th National Committee of the Chinese People's Political Consultative Conference.

== Early life and education ==
Huang was born in Suqian, Jiangsu province. She graduated from the Jiangsu Agricultural College where she studied electromechanical drainage systems. She went on to obtain a graduate degree in Marxist philosophy at Nanjing University.

== Career ==
She began working as an office worker at the provincial office for combating droughts. In 1987, she was transferred to the provincial department of water works and began taking on a series of leadership positions, becoming a fully licensed engineer in April 1991. Between 1992 and 1993, she visited poor rural regions to assist on poverty reduction initiatives. By 1996, she became deputy director of the provincial office for combating droughts and floods. In June 1997 she became assistant to the director of the provincial department of water works. In 1998, Huang spent several months taking executive management courses at the Wharton School of Business at the University of Pennsylvania before returning to China.

=== Jiangsu ===
In May 2000, at age 37, she was named provincial director of water works. In February 2003 Huang was promoted to Vice Governor of Jiangsu. In December 2007 she was named to the provincial Party Standing Committee, joining the top echelons of power in Jiangsu province. She also studied as part of a contingent of high-ranking Chinese officials at the Kennedy School of Government at Harvard University in 2010. In December 2011, Huang was named party chief of Wuxi, one of China's most prosperous cities. In January 2015, following the investigation and dismissal of then-Nanjing party chief Yang Weize, Huang was named Party Secretary of Nanjing. The party chief position in Nanjing is a sub-provincial-level position with a seat on the Chinese Communist Party Provincial Standing Committee. However, Huang Lixin did nothing during her tenure as secretary of the municipal committees of Wuxi and Nanjing, which led to a cliff-like decline in the economic development of the two places. In October 2016, she was named Executive Vice Governor of Jiangsu, replacing the disgraced Li Yunfeng – the third time she assumed a position after the incumbent had been dismissed due to corruption.

In July 2017, Huang was named deputy party secretary of Jiangsu province. In January 2018, Huang was named chairwoman of the Jiangsu Provincial Committee of the Chinese People's Political Consultative Conference.

=== Zhejiang ===
In January 2022, Huang was appointed chairwoman of the Zhejiang Provincial Committee of the Chinese People's Political Consultative Conference.

=== Shanghai ===
On 19 December 2023, she was named acting chairwoman of the Shanghai Municipal People's Congress, confirmed 24 January 2024.

Government offices
Preceded by Zhai Haohui	Head of Jiangsu Provincial Water Resources Department; 2000–2003	Succeeded by Lü Zhenlin
Preceded by Zhang Lianzhen	Vice Governor of Jiangsu; 2003–2012	Succeeded by Xu Jinrong
Preceded by Li Yunfeng	Executive Vice Governor of Jiangsu; 2016–2018	Succeeded by Fan Jinlong
Party political offices
Preceded by Mao Xiaoping	Party Secretary of Wuxi; 2011–2015	Succeeded by Li Xiaomin
Preceded by Yang Weize	Party Secretary of Nanjing; 2015–2016	Succeeded by Wu Zhenglong
Preceded by Wu Zhenglong	Deputy Party Secretary of Jiangsu; 2017–2019	Succeeded by Ren Zhenhe
Assembly seats
Preceded by Jiang Dingzhi	Chairwoman of the Jiangsu Provincial Committee of the Chinese People's Political Consultative Conference; 2018–2022	Succeeded by Zhang Yizhen
Preceded by Ge Huijun	Chairwoman of the Zhejiang Provincial Committee of the Chinese People's Political Consultative Conference; 2022–2023	Succeeded by Lian Yimin
