= Fei Gaoyun =

Chinese politician

- 费高云

Communist Party Secretary of Hefei
- In office May 2025 – May 2026

Vice Governor of Jiangsu
- In office January 2018 – December 2022

Personal details
- Born: August 1971 (age 55) Huaiyin, Jiangsu, China
- Party: Chinese Communist Party
- Education: Yangzhou Institute of Technology; Nanjing University
- Occupation: Politician

Fei Gaoyun (Chinese: 费高云; born August 1971) is a Chinese politician who is currently a member of the 20th Central Committee of the Chinese Communist Party, a standing committee member of the Chinese Communist Party (CCP) Anhui Provincial Committee, and the Party Secretary of Hefei. He also serves as the first secretary of the Hefei Garrison District Party Committee. He previously served as vice governor of Jiangsu Province, as well as mayor and party secretary of Changzhou.

== Biography ==
=== Jiangsu ===
Fei Gaoyun was born in Huaiyin, Jiangsu Province, in August 1971. He studied radio technology at the Department of Electronic Science and Engineering at Yangzhou Institute of Technology between 1989 and 1993. He later obtained a master's degree in public administration from the School of Public Administration at Nanjing University. Fei joined the Chinese Communist Party in December 1992 and began working in August 1993.

Fei started his political career in his home region of Jiangsu, initially holding positions in the Communist Youth League in Hanjiang County. He later became township head of Yunxi Township, deputy secretary of the Party Committee in Yizheng, and subsequently vice mayor of Yizheng. In 2007, he was appointed mayor of Yizheng, and in 2008 became the city's Party Secretary. During this period, he also held concurrent leadership roles in the Yangzhou Chemical Industrial Park.

In 2011, Fei was transferred to Nantong, where he served as a standing committee member of the municipal Party committee, and later as Party Secretary of Tongzhou District and Qidong City. In early 2013, he moved to Changzhou, becoming deputy Party secretary and vice mayor before being appointed acting mayor in July 2013. He was confirmed as mayor in January 2014 and served until February 2017, when he became the Party Secretary of Changzhou and chairman of the Changzhou People's Congress Standing Committee.

In 2018, Fei was appointed vice governor of Jiangsu Province, a position he held until 2022, overseeing areas such as economic development and public administration. Between January and March 2021, he also served concurrently as secretary of the Jiangsu Provincial Political and Legal Affairs Commission.

In November 2019, Fei was given an administrative warning due to Xiangshui chemical plant explosion.

=== Anhui ===
In December 2022, he was transferred to Anhui Province, where he became a member of the provincial Party committee standing committee and later executive vice governor. In April 2025, Fei was appointed Party Secretary of Hefei, and in May also assumed the role of first secretary of the Hefei Garrison District Party Committee.

== Investigation ==
On 6 May 2026, Fei was suspected of "serious violations of laws and regulations" by the Central Commission for Discipline Inspection (CCDI), the party's internal disciplinary body, and the National Supervisory Commission, the highest anti-corruption agency of China.

Party political offices
Preceded by Zhang Hongwen	Communist Party Secretary of Hefei; April 2025 – May 2026	Succeeded by Tan Weiguo
Preceded by Wang Like	Secretary of the Political and Legal Affairs Commission of the CPC Jiangsu Provincial Committee; January 2021 – December 2021	Succeeded by Deng Xiuming
Preceded by Yan Li	Communist Party Secretary of Changzhou; February 2017 – February 2018	Succeeded by Wang Quan
Preceded by Sun Jianhua	Communist Party Secretary of Qidong; September 2012 –February 2013	Succeeded by Xu Feng
Preceded by Song Wenhui	Communist Party Secretary of Tongzhou District, Nantong; August 2011 – October 2012	Succeeded by Song Lewei
Preceded by Han Liming	Head of the Organization Department of the CPC Nantong Municipal Committee; July 2012 –February 2013	Succeeded by Zhang Zhaojiang
Preceded by Bu Yu	Communist Party Secretary of Yizheng; November 2008 – July 2011	Succeeded by Cheng Xi
Government offices
Preceded by Liu Hui	Executive Vice Governor of Anhui; January 2023 – May 2025	Vacant
Preceded by Fan Jinlong	Executive Vice Governor of Jiangsu; December 2021 – December 2022	Succeeded by Ma Xin
Preceded by Yao Xiaodong	Mayor of Changzhou; July 2013 – February 2017	Succeeded by Ding Chun
Preceded by Bu Yu	Mayor of Yizheng; December 2006 – November 2008	Succeeded by Cheng Xi
