= Wang Hao (politician, born 1965) =

Chinese politician

- 王昊

Vice Chairman of the Jiangsu Provincial Committee of the Chinese People's Political Consultative Conference
- In office January 2023 – May 2024
- Chairman: Zhang Yizhen

Communist Party Secretary of Suqian
- In office December 2020 – March 2023
- Preceded by: Zhang Aijun (politician, born 1964)
- Succeeded by: Chen Zhongwei

Mayor of Suqian
- In office January 2019 – December 2020
- Preceded by: Wang Tianqi
- Succeeded by: Liu Hao

Personal details
- Born: February 1965 (age 61) Dangshan County, Anhui, China
- Party: Chinese Communist Party (expelled; 1985–2024)
- Education: Nanjing University; Peking University

Wang Hao (Chinese: 王昊; pinyin: Wáng Hào; born February 1965) is a former Chinese politician who spent most of his career in his home-province Jiangsu. As of May 2024 he was under investigation by China's top anti-graft watchdog. Previously he served as vice chairman of the Jiangsu Provincial Committee of the Chinese People's Political Consultative Conference.

Wang was a representative of the 20th National Congress of the Chinese Communist Party.

== Early life and education ==
Wang was born in Dangshan County, Anhui, in February 1965. In 1983, he entered Nanjing University, where he majored in philosophy. He joined the Chinese Communist Party (CCP) in December 1985 during his sophomore year. He obtained a master's degree in public administration from Peking University in June 2009.

== Career ==
Wang worked in government after university in 1987. From September 1990 to August 2001, he worked at the Office of the CCP Xuzhou Municipal Committee. He was eventually promoted to deputy director in April 2001. He was secretary of the Pizhou Municipal Commission for Discipline Inspection in August 2001 and subsequently mayor of Pizhou in January 2003. He also served as deputy party secretary. After a short time as party secretary of Pei County, he was promoted to vice mayor of Xuzhou in December 2007. In December 2013 he was promoted again to become executive vice mayor. He was also a member of the CCP Xuzhou Municipal Committee, the city's top authority. In February 2017, he became chairman of the Xuzhou Municipal Committee of the Chinese People's Political Consultative Conference, but having held the position for only a year.

In February 2018, Wang was named acting mayor of Suqian, confirmed in January 2019. In December 2020, he was promoted to party secretary. It would be his first job as "first-in-charge" of a prefecture-level city. In January 2021, he was chosen as chairman of Suqian Municipal People's Congress, the city's top legislative body.

In January 2023, Wang took office as vice chairman of the Jiangsu Provincial Committee of the Chinese People's Political Consultative Conference, the provincial advisory body.

== Downfall ==
On 20 May 2024, Wang was put under investigation for alleged "serious violations of discipline and laws" by the Central Commission for Discipline Inspection (CCDI), the party's internal disciplinary body, and the National Supervisory Commission, the highest anti-corruption agency of China. He is the fourth mayor/ party secretary in Suqian to be targeted by China's top anticorruption watchdog, the other three are: Qiu He, Zhang Xinshi, and Miao Ruilin. On November 20, he was expelled from the CCP and dismissed from public office. On December 3, he was arrested by the Supreme People's Procuratorate for suspected bribe taking.

On 11 April 2025, Wang was indicted on suspicion of accepting bribes. On 7 January 2026, Wang was sentenced to 13 years and fined 4 million yuan, for bribery in 46.31 million yuan.

Government offices
Preceded by Wang Tianqi	Mayor of Suqian; 2019–2020	Succeeded by Liu Hao
Party political offices
Preceded by Zhang Aijun	Communist Party Secretary of Suqian; 2020–2023	Succeeded by Chen Zhongwei
