= Mao Xiaoping =

Chinese politician

- 毛小平

Communist Party Secretary of Wuxi
- In office April 2011 – December 2011
- Preceded by: Yang Weize
- Succeeded by: Huang Lixin

Mayor of Wuxi
- In office March 2003 – May 2011
- Preceded by: Wang Rong
- Succeeded by: Zhu Kejiang (朱克江)

Personal details
- Born: July 1957 (age 69) Wujin, Jiangsu
- Party: Chinese Communist Party (expelled)

Mao Xiaoping (Chinese: 毛小平; born July 1957) is a former Chinese politician, most widely known for his tenure as the Mayor and Chinese Communist Party Committee Secretary of Wuxi, a city in Jiangsu province. He was investigated for corruption in 2012 and later expelled from the Chinese Communist Party. He currently serves as the deputy director of the Jiangsu Supply and Marketing General Cooperative.

== Career ==
Mao was born in Wujin County, Jiangsu. In his early career, Mao worked for a visual arts academy in the city of Changzhou. He graduated from Nanjing Normal University in 1982, and became a teacher at Changzhou High School. In 1983, he got involved in the Communist Youth League organization in Changzhou, becoming the head of the organization a few years later. In 1988, he was promoted to become Chinese Communist Party Committee Secretary of Zhonglou District in Changzhou. In 1996, Mao became the administrative chief of the Changzhou New Area. A year later, he was promoted to Vice Mayor of Changzhou. In 1998, Mao was named deputy director of the provincial light industry bureau. In 2001, he was named Vice Mayor of Wuxi. He became Mayor of Wuxi in February 2004.

During Mao's mayoralty, Wuxi emerged as the city with the highest GDP per capita in the province. Mao was seen as a competent manager of the city's economy. The city began to build its first Metro lines. When Yang Weize left office as Wuxi's party boss in 2011, Mao, who by then had some ten years of experience working in the city, was considered a top contender for the office.

In April 2011, Mao was promoted to CCP Committee Secretary of the city of Wuxi, his first job as the top executive official of a city. He remained in office for less than a year. During Mao's eight-month tenure as party boss, the city's First People's Hospital was demolished, apparently to make way for the construction of a new hospital. In addition, the construction plans for a local garbage-powered electricity generation plant caused significant controversy with local residents and lowered the party chief's approval ratings. On December 22, 2011, Mao was placed under investigation and entered Shuanggui proceedings, and was removed from his post as party chief of Wuxi. During Shuanggui, Mao was reportedly uncooperative with investigators and maintained his innocence.

In February 2012, Mao was named the deputy director of the Jiangsu Supply and Marketing General Cooperative, maintaining a department-level rank. However, the Central Commission for Discipline Inspection announced in early 2012 that Mao would undergo further investigation for "severe violations of discipline". The investigation concluded that Mao violated party discipline by taking bribes to the equivalent of 577,000 yuan (~$90,000), was of "depraved morality", "maintained extramarital relations with two women," but did not state that he broke the law. He was demoted from department-level to division-level (chuji), and expelled from the CCP on April 14, 2012. The mention of Mao's extramarital relationships was considered unusual at the time, though after the 18th National Congress of the Chinese Communist Party mentions of "adultery" have become fairly commonplace for party investigations into officials accused of corruption.

Mao was a delegate to the 11th National People's Congress.

== See also ==
- Ji Jianye
- Zhang Tianxin, another official who was investigated but not charged with criminal wrongdoing

Political offices
Preceded by Wang Rong	Mayor of Wuxi; 2003–2011	Succeeded by Zhu Kejiang
Party political offices
Preceded by Yang Weize	Communist Party Secretary of Wuxi; 2011	Succeeded by Huang Lixin
