= Shining Energy =

辉煌 Shining Energy

Studio album by Twelve Girls Band
- Released: January 1, 2004
- Genre: Chinese folk, World
- Label: Toshiba EMI

Twelve Girls Band chronology
美麗的能量; Beautiful Energy (2003)	辉煌; Shining Energy (2004)	Eastern Energy (2004)

Glory ~ Shining Energy (辉煌), known as Kikō ~ Shining Energy ~ (輝煌 ~ Shining Energy ~) in Japan, is the second China/Japan studio album by Chinese band Twelve Girls Band. It was released on January 1, 2004, by Toshiba EMI. The album was certified Platinum by the Recording Industry Association of Japan. It consists of fifteen songs in a sort of modernized Chinese form.

== Track listing ==
1. The Great Canyon
2. Glory (As Kiko in Japanese Version)
3. Ii Hi Tabidachi
4. Shining Energy
5. Asu e no Tobira
6. Loulan Girl
7. Reel Around the Sun
8. Only Time
9. Jasmin
10. Toki No Nagare Ni Mi Wo Makase
11. Fantasy
12. Swan Lake
13. Flame
14. Prayer
15. Butterfly
