= Keming =

Keming may refer to:

== People ==
- Keming, courtesy name of Du Ruhui (585–630), Tang Dynasty chancellor
- Liu Keming, other name of Liu Zhixun (1898–1932), member of the Chinese Workers' and Peasants' Red Army
- Cao Keming (1934–2014), People's Republic of China politician in Jiangsu
- Hu Keming (born 1940), Chinese table tennis player
- Bai Keming (born 1943), People's Republic of China politician, member of the National People's Congress

== See also ==
- A misspelling of "kerning"
- Keming Primary School in Singapore
