= Xu Zhonglin (politician) =

Chinese politician

- 许仲林

Chairperson of the Jiangsu Provincial Committee of the Chinese People's Political Consultative Conference
- In office February 2003 – January 2008
- Preceded by: Cao Keming
- Succeeded by: Zhang Lianzhen

Governor of Anhui
- In office January 2000 – October 2002
- Preceded by: Wang Taihua
- Succeeded by: Wang Jinshan

Personal details
- Born: December 1943 (age 82) Changshu, Jiangsu, China
- Party: Chinese Communist Party
- Education: PLA Surveying and Mapping Institute

Chinese name
- Simplified Chinese: 许仲林
- Traditional Chinese: 許仲林
Transcriptions
Standard Mandarin
- Hanyu Pinyin: Xǔ Zhònglín

Xu Zhonglin (Chinese: 许仲林; born December 1943) is a Chinese politician who served as governor of Anhui from 2000 to 2002 and chairperson of the Jiangsu Provincial Committee of the Chinese People's Political Consultative Conference from 2003 to 2008.

Xu was a representative of the 14th, 15th, and 16th National Congress of the Chinese Communist Party. He was a delegate to the 7th National People's Congress. He was a member of the 10th National Committee of the Chinese People's Political Consultative Conference and a member of the Standing Committee of the 10th Chinese People's Political Consultative Conference.

== Early life and education ==
Xu was born in Changshu, Jiangsu, in December 1943. In 1960, he enrolled at the PLA Surveying and Mapping Institute, where he majored in wireless.

== Career ==
=== Jiangsu ===
After graduation in 1962, Xu taught at the institute. He joined the Chinese Communist Party (CCP) in November 1964.

From October 1969 to May 1975, Xu worked at Xuzhou Semiconductor Factory and Xuzhou Electronic Instrument Bureau. He was vice mayor of Xuzhou in September 1980 and subsequently head of the Organization Department of the CCP Xuzhou Municipal Committee in July 1984. He was promoted to mayor in May 1986, in addition to serving as deputy party secretary. In October 1989, he became deputy head of the Organization Department of the CCP Jiangsu Provincial Committee, rising to head in March 1991. In February 1992, he was admitted to standing committee member of the CCP Jiangsu Provincial Committee, the province's top authority. In December 1994, he was made deputy party secretary of Jiangsu.

=== Anhui ===
In 1999, Xu was transferred to the neighbouring Anhui province, where he was appointed deputy party secretary in December 1999 and governor in January 2000. He took up the post of chairperson of the Jiangsu Provincial Committee of the Chinese People's Political Consultative Conference which he held only from February 2003 to January 2008, although he remained deputy party secretary until April 2003.

=== Beijing ===
In March 2008, Xu was chosen as vice chairperson of the Social and Legal Affairs Committee of the 11th National Committee of the Chinese People's Political Consultative Conference.

Government offices
Preceded by He Fushuo	Mayor of Xuzhou; 1986–1992	Succeeded by Wang Wulong
Preceded by Wang Taihua	Governor of Anhui; 2000–2002	Succeeded by Wang Jinshan
Assembly seats
Preceded by Cao Keming	Chairperson of the Jiangsu Provincial Committee of the Chinese People's Political Consultative Conference; 2003–2008	Succeeded by Zhang Lianzhen
