= Meili Yinyuehui =

Album by Twelve Girls Band

Meili Yinyuehui simplified Chinese: 魅力音乐会; traditional Chinese: 魅力音樂會; pinyin: Mèilì yīnyuèhuì), literally known as An Enchanted Concert, is the original debut album by Twelve Girls Band / 女子十二乐坊. It consists of one disc with eight songs, and a second disc with ten songs in modernized Chinese form.

The album features traditional Chinese instruments including the dizi, duxianqin, erhu, guzheng, pipa, sanxian, xiao, xun, and yangqin. In addition to original songs, the album contained a Johann Sebastian Bach composition and the single "Take Five" by Dave Brubeck. It included the Chinese folk songs "Mo Li Hua" and "Kangding Qingge".

== Release ==
The album was released in 2001 by Nanjing Yinxiang (南京音像). It was issued in Japan in July 2003. By March 2004, it recorded sales of more than 1.7 million. It received an award at the 45th Japan Record Awards. According to the Nanjing Daily, the album increased the demand in the Japanese market for Chinese musical instruments.

== Reception ==
In a positive review, a Lanzhou Evening News critic said that "they bring to life not only the treasures of folk music but also the light, romantic essence of modern compositions" through their traditional instruments. Lu Yunshui of the Nanjing Daily wrote that the women "blend the ancient sounds of Chinese instruments with Western pop music, creating an entirely new form of performance".

== Track listing ==
=== Disc 1 ===
1. S.D花园 "S.D Garden"
2. 相爱已无 "I Can't Be Your Man"
3. 自由 "Free"
4. 预知 "Anticipation"
5. 嗨！向吧哈致敬 "Hey! A Tribute to Bach"
6. 魂之舞 "Spirit Dance"
7. 都市夜曲 "City Night"
8. 感谢年华 "Thanks for Age"

=== Disc 2 ===
1. 春梦 "Dream of Spring"
2. 五拍 "Take Five"
3. 无词 "No Words"
4. 塞琳娜之歌 "Song for Selina"
5. 午夜心境 "Midnight Mood"
6. 节奏之中 "Rhythm Within"
7. 茉莉花 "Jasmine Flower"
8. 爱的读法 "Spell of Love"
9. 勇往直前 "Go Straight Ahead by Way"
10. 康定情歌 "Kang Ding Qing Ge"
