= Gao Xiang =

Gao Xiang may refer to:

- Gao Xiang (Three Kingdoms) (fl. 217–240s), general of Shu Han during the Three Kingdoms period
- Gao Xiang (painter) (1688–1753), Qing dynasty painter
- Gao Xiang (footballer) (born 1989), Chinese footballer
- Xiang Gao, Chinese violinist
- Gao Xiang (historian) (born 1963), Chinese historian and politician
