= Earthly Stars (Unsung Heroes) =

2000 single by Miyuki Nakajima

Single by Miyuki Nakajima

from the album Short Stories (Tanpenshū)
- A-side: "Headlight, Taillight"
- Released: July 19, 2000
- Genre: Folk rock, ambient rock
- Length: 5:11
- Label: Yamaha Music Communications
- Songwriter: Miyuki Nakajima
- Producers: Ichizo Seo, Miyuki Nakajima

Miyuki Nakajima singles chronology
"Not Even Blinking" (1998)	"Earthly Stars (Unsung Heroes)" / "Headlight, Taillight" (2000)	"Ride on the Gentle Luminous Dragon" (2003)

Music video
- "Earthly Stars" on YouTube

"Earthly Stars (Unsung Heroes)" (地上の星, Chijō no Hoshi) is a song that Japanese musician Miyuki Nakajima composed and recorded for the country's acclaimed television documentary program Project X -Chōsenshatachi-, which aired on NHK during the first half of the 2000s. It was released as a double A-Side single with "Headlight, Taillight" (ヘッドライト・テールライト, Heddoraito Tēruraito) in July 2000 and reached the number-one spot after 30 months, becoming one of the longest running singles in history of the Japanese Oricon chart started in 1968.

== History ==
After releasing a couple of commercially lackluster studio albums, Nakajima left Pony Canyon, a record label she had belonged to since her debut. Double A-Side single "Earthly Stars (Unsung Heroes)"/"Headlight, Taillight" is the first release under the record label, Yamaha Music Communications, which was newly founded in 2000.

Both songs were originally written for the TV documentary series Project X: Challengers (プロジェクトX～挑戦者たち～, purojekuto X chōsenshatachi) which was aired on NHK. Akira Imai, a producer of the television program decided to ask Nakajima to write theme songs, because he was moved by lyrics of her 1998 smash hit "Another Name for Life". Imai thought that her insight on the song coincided with concept of a documentary that reports unknown activities of obscure people, who built up the modern Japanese society. The program premiered in March 2000, and her theme song which features her distinctive vocals widely became known.

An opening and a closing theme on the program were released as the thirty-seventh single for Nakajima in July 2000, and both of them also appeared on her 28th studio album Short Stories released in November 2000. In 2004, Nakajima re-recorded "Earthly Stars" on her studio live album and DVD entitled Miyuki Nakajima Live! -Live at Sony Pictures Studio in L.A.-, released in the following year. Utatabi, her 2008 live album released on CD and DVD also includes a live recording of "Earthly Stars" performed in December 2007.

== Reception ==
"Earthly Stars (Unsung Heroes)" / "Headlight, Taillight" debuted at the number-15 on the Japanese Oricon Chart, in excess of 35,000 copies sold. It became a smash hit because of the long-lasting popularity of the TV documentary program, remaining on the Oricon charts for more than two years.

On 31 December 2002, Nakajima made her appearance on the annual NHK music program Kōhaku Uta Gassen where she performed "Earthly Stars" from the tunnel in Kurobe dam, Toyama Prefecture. Nakajima's performance recorded the highest audience ratings from the program in 2002. After appearing on the show, the single began climbing the charts again, reaching No. 1 in January 2003. The single was later certified to have sold more than a million copies. The video on YouTube has been watched 94 million times as of November 2023.

== Cover versions ==
=== Earthly Stars (Unsung Heroes) ===
Year	Performer	Album	Genre	Notes
2003	Various (Nobuo Furukawa, Toshihiro Nakanishi, Chuei Yoshikawa, Hideo Yamaki)	the most relaxing feel 3; Peace of mind	Easy listening	
2003	Richard Clayderman	Clayderman Plays Antique Pianos	Easy listening	
2003	Twelve Girls Band	Beautiful Energy	Easy listening/world	also appeared on their 2004 Eastern Energy album released in the U.S.
2003	Julia Fordham	Nakajima Miyuki Tribute; Yourself...Myself...		sung in English lyrics written by Justin Tyme
2004	Fuyumi Sakamoto	Zenkyokushū	Enka/kayokyoku	
2005	Michiko Shimizu	Uta no Album	Parody	as a part of the track "Utahime Medley"
2007	Aya Endo (as Miyuki Takara)	Lucky Star Ending Theme Collection	Anime soundtrack	
2009	Demon Kogure	Girls' Rock ~Tiara~	Heavy Metal	
2009	Dr. Metal Factory	Cover Metal Now	Heavy Metal	
2021	Shizuka Kudo	Aoi Honō	kayokyoku	

=== Headlight, Taillight ===
Year	Performer	Album	Genre	Notes
2001	Takashi Obara	Try! Try! Try! Piano yo Utae Special; J-Pop Tokushū 2001	Easy listening	
2003	Janis Ian	Nakajima Miyuki Tribute; Yourself...Myself...	Folk	sung in English lyrics written by Ian

== Uses in popular culture ==
The song Earthly Stars was sung in karaoke form at the end of Episode 7 of the anime Lucky Star. It was sung by a character named Miyuki Takara, voiced by Aya Endo. (see also: List of Lucky Star albums)

The song is also used in the Suntory Boss Commercial featuring Tommy Lee Jones.

The song Headlight/Taillight is used in the anime Nichijou (Part 79)

The song was used in the 15th season of the show GameCenter CX, in the segment Project CX, a segment about Famicom peripherals. Miyuki Nakajima sings the song with lyrics related to the featured peripheral.

== Track listing ==
All songs written and composed by Miyuki Nakajima, arranged by Ichizo Seo

1. "Earthly Stars (Unsung Heroes)" (地上の星, Chijou no Hoshi) – 05:11
2. "Headlight, Taillight" (ヘッドライト・テールライト, Heddoraito Tēruraito) – 04:58
3. "Earthly Stars (Unsung Heroes)" (地上の星, Chijou no Hoshi) [TV mix] – 05:11
4. "Headlight, Taillight" (ヘッドライト・テールライト, Heddoraito Tēruraito) [TV mix] – 04:58

== Personnel ==
- Miyuki Nakajima – vocals
- Ichizo Seo – keyboards, strings arrangement & conduct
- Hideo Yamaki – tomtom, cymbals
- Hideki Matsubara – bass guitar
- Masayoshi Furukawa – electric guitar
- Elton Nagata – keyboards, acoustic piano
- Keishi Urata – computer programming
- Seiichi Takubo – computer programming
- Masatsugu Shinozaki – violin, concertmaster
- Kiyo Kido – violin
- Jun Yamamoto – violin
- Yumiko Hirose – violin
- Osamu Inou – violin
- Kei Shinozaki – violin
- Yu Sugino – violin
- Naoyuki Takahashi – violin
- Kathrine Cash – violin
- Tsunehiro Shigyo – violin
- Keiko Nakamura – violin
- Machia Saito – violin
- Masako Mabuchi – viola
- Joshin Toyama – viola
- Gentaro Sakaguchi – viola
- Kaori Naruse – viola
- Masaharu Karita – cello
- Tomoya Kikuchi – cello
- Masahiro Tanaka – cello
- Susumu Miyake – cello
- Yasuhiro Kido – background vocals
- Fumikazu Miyashita – background vocals
- Katsumi Maeda – background vocals
- Toshiro Kirigaya – background vocals
- Etsuro Wakakonai – background vocals

== Chart positions ==
Year	Country	Chart	Position	Weeks	Sales
2000–03	Japan	Oricon Weekly Singles Chart (top 100)	1	183	1.1 million+
2000–03	Japan	Oricon Weekly Singles Chart (top 200)	1	202	1.1 million+

Footnotes: Until expansion of the hit parade in December 2002, Oricon provided only the top-100 sales charts in general (except a more detailed magazine especially published for the music industry called Original Confidence)
