= North University =

North University may refer to

- North University of China
- North University (Norway)
