= Li Yunfeng =

Chinese politician

- 李云峰

Executive Vice Governor of Jiangsu
- In office March 2011 – May 2016
- Preceded by: Zhao Kezhi
- Succeeded by: Huang Lixin

Secretary-general of the Party Committee of Jiangsu
- In office November 2006 – November 2011
- Preceded by: Zhao Shaolin
- Succeeded by: Fan Jinlong

Personal details
- Born: March 1957 (age 69) Jurong, Jiangsu, China
- Party: Chinese Communist Party (expelled)
- Education: Peking University
- Occupation: Politician

Li Yunfeng (Chinese: 李云峰; born March 1957) is a Chinese former politician who spent his career in Jiangsu province. He served as the secretary-general of the provincial party committee and the Executive Vice Governor of Jiangsu. He was investigated in May 2016 by the Communist Party's anti-graft agency, suspected of corruption.

== Biography ==
Li was born in 1957 in Jurong County, Jiangsu. He obtained a bachelor's degree in philosophy from Peking University. He was a sent-down youth during the Cultural Revolution, performing manual labour. He joined the Communist Party in 1981 while he was attending university, and returned home after obtaining his degree.

Upon returning home, Li initially worked as an instructor at the Zhenjiang party school. In August 1983 he began working as a secretary in the department overseeing the affairs of elderly cadres. In October 1993 he had a guazhi position as deputy party chief of Jiangyin. In January 1996 he was made deputy chief of the General Office of the provincial party organization, and by June 1997 he was made deputy secretary-general. He was elevated to secretary-general in November 2006, serving as chief of staff to then party chief Li Yuanchao, and entering the provincial party standing committee for the first time.

Li was named Executive Vice Governor of Jiangsu in 2011. Some media reports suggested that the wives of Li Yunfeng and Yang Weize were sisters.

On May 30, 2016, Li was placed under investigation by the Central Commission for Discipline Inspection. He was expelled from the Party on April 7, 2017.

On March 22, 2018, Li was sentenced to 12 years in prison for taking bribes worth 14.77 million yuan by the Intermediate People's Court in Heze.

Li is an alternate member of the 18th Central Committee of the Chinese Communist Party.
