= Party Secretary of Nanjing =

Government position in China

Secretary of the Nanjing Municipal Committee of the Chinese Communist Party
- 中国共产党南京市委员会书记
- Emblem of the Chinese Communist Party

- Flag of the Chinese Communist Party
- Incumbent; Zhou Hongbo since December 1, 2024
- Nanjing Municipal Committee of the Chinese Communist Party
- Type: Party Committee Secretary
- Status: Deputy provincial and ministerial-level official
- Member of: Nanjing Municipal Standing Committee
- Seat: Nanjing
- Nominator: Central Committee
- Appointer: Nanjing Municipal Committee; Central Committee
- Inaugural holder: Liu Bocheng
- Formation: May 1949
- Deputy: Deputy Secretary; Secretary-General

The secretary of the Nanjing Municipal Committee of the Chinese Communist Party is the leader of the Nanjing Municipal Committee of the Chinese Communist Party (CCP). As the CCP is the sole ruling party of the People's Republic of China (PRC), the secretary is the highest ranking post in Nanjing.

The secretary is officially appointed by the CCP Central Committee based on the recommendation of the CCP Organization Department, which is then approved by the Politburo and its Standing Committee. The secretary can be also appointed by a plenary meeting of the Nanjing Municipal Committee, but the candidate must be the same as the one approved by the central government. The secretary leads the Standing Committee of the Nanjing Municipal Committee. The secretary leads the work of the Municipal Committee and its Standing Committee. The secretary is outranks the mayor, who is generally the deputy secretary of the committee.

The current secretary is Zhou Hongbo, who took office on 1 December 2024.

== List of party secretaries ==
After the Yangtze River Crossing campaign by the CCP on April 23, 1949, a total of 25 individuals have consecutively occupied the position of Secretary of the CCP Nanjing Municipal Committee.

No.	Name	Took office	Left office	Notes
1	Liu Bocheng	May 1949	June 1949	
2	Su Yu	June 1949	May 1950	
3	Tang Liang	May 1950	May 1950	
4	Ke Qingshi	August 1950	October 1954	
5	Peng Chong	October 1954	September 1960	
6	Chen Yang	September 1960	January 1963	
7	Peng Chong	January 1963	May 1966	
8	Yang Guangli	May 1966	December 1970	
9	Fang Min	December 1970	June 1974	
10	Wang Chubin	June 1974	August 1975	
11	Chu Jiang	August 1975	October 1981	
12	Liu Lin	October 1981	September 1982	
13	Wang Bingshi	September 1982	February 1984	
14	Cheng Weigao	February 1984	July 1987	
15	Zhang Yaohua	July 1987	February 1991	
16	Gu Hao	February 1991	June 1995	
17	Wang Wulong	June 1995	October 2001	
18	Li Yuanchao	October 2001	April 2003	
19	Luo Zhijun	April 2003	April 2008	
20	Zhu Shanlu	February 2008	March 2011	
21	Yang Weize	March 2011	March 2015	
22	Huang Lixin	January 2015	October 2016	
23	Wu Zhenglong	October 2016	May 2017	
24	Zhang Jinghua	July 2017	April 2021	
25	Han Liming	April 2021	1 December 2024	
26	Zhou Hongbo	1 December 2024	Incumbent	
