= Zhu Shanlu =

Chinese politician

Zhu Shanlu 朱善璐
- Born: November 1953 (age 72–73); Jin County, Liaoning
- Education: Peking University
- Occupations: Party Secretary of Peking University (2011–2016); Party Secretary of Nanjing (2008–2011)
- Political party: Chinese Communist Party

Zhu Shanlu (Chinese: 朱善璐; born November 1953) is a Chinese politician who served as the Chinese Communist Party Committee Secretary of Peking University from 2011 to 2016. He previously served as Party Committee Secretary of the city of Nanjing.

== Biography ==
Zhu was born in Jin County, Liaoning province, near the modern city of Jinzhou. He graduated with a degree in philosophy from Peking University. He joined the Chinese Communist Party (CCP) in 1978 and was involved with the Communist Youth League and the CCP organization on the Beida campus. In April 1998, he was named CCP Committee Secretary of Haidian District, where Beida is located; he served until May 2002, when he was made a member of the Standing Committee of the Beijing Municipal Committee of the CCP, which made him an official of sub-provincial rank. In August 2008, he was transferred to Nanjing to become CCP Committee Secretary; he served in the position until March 2011.

He was an alternate of the 18th Central Committee of the Chinese Communist Party. In August 2011, Zhu was named party chief of Peking University. The position has the ranking of a provincial vice governor and appointments to the post are vetted by the central party leadership.

Party political offices
Preceded by Min Weifang	Party Secretary of Peking University; 2011–2016	Succeeded by Hao Ping
Preceded by Wang Guosheng	Deputy Party Secretary of Jiangsu; 2011	Succeeded by Shi Taifeng
Preceded by Luo Zhijun	Party Secretary of Nanjing; 2008–2011	Succeeded by Yang Weize
