= Lan Shaomin =

Chinese politician

- 蓝绍敏

Chairman of the Heilongjiang Provincial Committee of the Chinese People's Political Consultative Conference
- Incumbent
- Assumed office January 2023
- Preceded by: Huang Jiansheng

Communist Party Secretary of Suzhou
- In office September 2019 – September 2020
- Preceded by: Zhou Naixiang
- Succeeded by: Cao Lubao

Mayor of Nanjing
- In office 19 January 2018 – 25 October 2019
- Party Secretary: Zhang Jinghua
- Preceded by: Miao Ruilin
- Succeeded by: Han Liming

Personal details
- Born: January 1964 (age 62) Dabu County, Guangdong, China
- Party: Chinese Communist Party

Lan Shaomin (Chinese: 蓝绍敏; born January 1964) is a Chinese politician, currently serving as the Chinese Communist Party Committee Secretary of Suzhou and Vice-Governor of Jiangsu province.

== Biography ==
He joined the Chinese Communist Party (CCP) in 1984, and began his career in 1985. From 2003 to 2006, he served as Vice-Mayor of Nantong City, and as Executive Vice-Mayor from 2006 to 2011. From 2011 to 2012, he served as acting Mayor of Suqian City. From 2012 to 2014, he served as Secretary of the Suqian City Committee of the CCP. He would also serve concurrently from 2012 to 2013 as Mayor of Suqian. From 2014 to 2017, he served as Secretary of the Taizhou City CPC Committee. In 2018, he started to serve as the mayor of Nanjing, following Miao Ruilin’s resignation. He served as CCP Committee Secretary of Suzhou since September 2019 for a year before appointed CCP Deputy Committee Secretary of Guizhou in 2020.

He is selected as the Chairman of the Heilongjiang Provincial Committee of the Chinese People's Political Consultative Conference in January 2023.

Assembly seats
Preceded by Huang Jiansheng	Chairman of the CPPCC Heilongjiang Provincial Committee; January 2023 –	Incumbent
Party political offices
Preceded by Shen Yiqin	Executive Deputy Communist Party Secretary of Guizhou; September 2020 – April 2022	Succeeded by Shi Guanghui
Preceded by Zhou Naixiang	Communist Party Secretary of Suzhou; September 2019 – September 2020	Succeeded by Xu Kunlin
Preceded by Zhang Lei	Communist Party Secretary of Taizhou, Jiangsu; July 2014 – March 2017	Succeeded by Qu Futian
Preceded by Miao Ruilin	Communist Party Secretary of Suqian; February 2013 – July 2014	Succeeded by Wei Guoqiang
Government offices
Preceded by Miao Ruilin	Mayor of Nanjing; January 2018 – October 2019	Succeeded by Han Liming
Preceded by Miao Ruilin	Mayor of Suqian; May 2011 – February 2013	Succeeded by Wang Tianqi
