= Jiang Hongkun =

Chinese politician

Jiang Hongkun (Chinese: 蒋宏坤; born January 1954) is a Chinese politician best known for his term as the mayor of Nanjing, the Chinese Communist Party Committee Secretary of Suzhou, and a member of the Jiangsu provincial Party Standing Committee.

== Biography ==
Jiang Hongkun was born in Shazhou County, Jiangsu province, in 1956. He worked as a manual labourer at a rural commune, where he later took on leadership and administrative roles. He joined the Chinese Communist Party in 1976, at the end of the Cultural Revolution. After the Cultural Revolution, he joined the diesel engine factory in Shazhou County, where he served as a shop floor worker, before being promoted to leadership and administrative roles. In January 1985, he became a manager at the Shazhou Engines Company.

In June 1986, he became head of the international trade commission of the city of Zhangjiagang. In February 1991 he was named vice mayor of Zhangjiagang, and in 1997 elevated to deputy party chief. In December 1997 he was named party chief of Zhangjiagang. In 2001 he was a member of the Suzhou Party Standing Committee, then in November 2001 became vice mayor of Nanjing (department-level), in April 2003 he was named acting mayor of Nanjing, confirmed by a full session of the municipal People's Congress in January 2004.

In August 2009, Jiang was promoted to a member of the Jiangsu provincial Party Standing Committee, then Chinese Communist Party Committee Secretary of Suzhou. He left the post in June 2014, after having reached retirement age for active sub-provincial-level officials, and was named a Vice Chairman of the People's Congress of Jiangsu.

Party political offices
Preceded by Wang Rong	Communist Party Secretary of Suzhou; 2009–2014	Succeeded by Shi Taifeng
Political offices
Preceded by Luo Zhijun	Mayor of Nanjing; 2003–2009	Succeeded by Ji Jianye
