= Death of Yu Qiyi =

Yu Qiyi (Chinese: 於其一; pinyin: Yū Qíyī), who was a Chinese Communist Party member and the chief engineer of Wenzhou Industry Investment Group, died on 9 April 2013, during a shuanggui interrogation that involved torture. Shuanggui is an internal Communist Party disciplinary procedure where officials are asked—or coerced—to confess to alleged wrongdoings.

The coroner reported that Yu Qiyi had drowned, but the cause of his drowning was originally unclear: Wenzhou officials said it was an accident, but photos released by the family showed welts all over his body. He was also in custody the entire time, and they thought it would have been unlikely that he had accidentally drowned. Yu's wife, Wu Qian, alleged that there were many internal and external injuries on his body, and that he must have been tortured, perhaps leading to his death.

"Yu Qiyi was a strong man before the shuanggui process, but he was thin by the time he died," Wu Qian told the Beijing Times.

The Zhejiang Provincial Public Security Bureau assigned the case to Quzhou security officials, rather than to those from Wenzhou, to investigate the case. The final report said that six investigators from the Communist Party's Disciplinary Committee in Wenzhou were involved.

The six men were jailed, in a rare public prosecution for such cases. The men claimed they were acting on "orders from above" and complained that they had been made scapegoats for the Party's own established procedures. Eventually they were sentenced to between 4 and 14 years in prison.
