= Li Jianhua (politician) =

Chinese politician

- 李建华

Party Secretary of Ningxia
- In office 19 March 2013 – 26 April 2017
- Preceded by: Zhang Yi
- Succeeded by: Shi Taifeng

Personal details
- Born: September 1954 (age 71)
- Party: Chinese Communist Party

Li Jianhua (Chinese: 李建华; pinyin: Li Jiànhuá; Mandarin pronunciation: [lì tɕjɛ̂n xwǎ]; born September 1954) is a Chinese politician who served as the Party Secretary of Ningxia between 2013 and 2017.

== Career ==
Li Jianhua was born in Gucheng County, Hebei in 1954. He enlisted in the People's Liberation Army from December 1969 to February 1973, and joined the Chinese Communist Party in May 1975.

From 1978 to 2011 Li rose through the ranks of the Organization Department of the Chinese Communist Party, with a brief stint as the head of the Organization Department of Sichuan province from 2000 to 2002. From 2003 to 2011 he served as the deputy head of the Organization Department of the Central Committee. From 2011 to 2013 he was the party secretary and vice president of China National School of Administration, a minister-level position.

In March 2013 Li Jianhua was appointed Party Secretary of Ningxia, replacing Zhang Yi as the top leader of the province-level region. He left the post in 2017, at age 62. In June, he joined a committee on the Chinese People's Political Consultative Conference.

Li was a member of the 18th Central Committee of the Chinese Communist Party.

Party political offices
Preceded by Zhang Yi	Party Secretary of Ningxia; 2013–2017	Succeeded by Shi Taifeng
