= Wang Like =

Chinese politician

- 王立科

Secretary of the Jiangsu Provincial Political and Legal Affairs Commission
- In office December 2015 – October 2020
- Preceded by: Li Xiaomin
- Succeeded by: Fei Gaoyun

Personal details
- Born: December 1964 (age 61) Penglai County, Shandong, China
- Party: Chinese Communist Party (1984–2021; expelled)
- Education: Central Party School of the Chinese Communist Party

Wang Like (Chinese: 王立科; pinyin: Wáng Lìkē; born 2 December 1964) is a Chinese police official and politician of Manchu heritage, serving since 2015 as the Secretary of Jiangsu Provincial Political and Legal Affairs Commission (Zhengfawei), and a member of the provincial Party Standing Committee. In September 2022, Wang Like was given the death sentence with reprieve for bribery and corruption.

== Biography ==
Wang is of Manchu ethnic background, and was born in Penglai County, Shandong. He joined the Chinese Communist Party (CCP) in December 1984. He graduated from the Liaoning Law Enforcement College, and made his way up the ranks in the policing system of Liaoning province, working in Beizhen, Jinzhou, Huludao, and finally Dalian, where he served as the city's police chief. For his work in Dalian in multiple fires, Wang was awarded national-level recognition by then Vice Minister of Public Security Liu Jinguo.

In March 2013, Wang was transferred to Jiangsu to serve as provincial police chief there. In December 2013, he was named vice-governor of Jiangsu, ascending to sub-provincial level. Wang was named a member of the provincial Party Standing Committee in November 2015, then in December, became head of the Zhengfawei of Jiangsu province. In December 2015, he resigned as vice governor of Jiangsu.

== Downfall ==
On 24 October 2020, he turned himself in and is cooperating with the Central Commission for Discipline Inspection (CCDI) and National Commission of Supervision for investigation of "suspected violations of disciplines and laws".

On 20 September 2021, he was expelled from the CCP and removed from public office. An investigation found that Wang lost his ideals and convictions, was disloyal and dishonest to the Party, refused to cooperate in the investigation, falsified personal information submitted to Party organs, used public funds for personal purposes, intervened in judicial affairs, abused his power to seek benefits for others and took a huge amount of bribes, and had a lavish and dissolute lifestyle and traded power and money for sex. On October 12, he was arrested for suspected bribe taking.

On 22 September 2022, he was handed a suspended death sentence at the Intermediate People's Court of Changchun that will be commuted to life imprisonment after two years, with no possibility of parole, for taking bribes worth 440 million yuan (about $63 million). He was deprived of his political rights for life, and all his personal assets were confiscated.

== Personal life ==
Wang is the younger of three children. His father is a local businessman. His second elder brother Wang Liwei (王立维), former vice mayor of Jinzhou, was placed under investigation. His ex-wife Xia Juan (夏娟; former party secretary of Liaoning Police College) and daughter were also put under investigation.

Government offices
Preceded by Zhang Jixian	Head of Dalian Public Security Bureau; 2009–2013	Succeeded by Liu Leguo
Preceded by Sun Wende	Head of Jiangsu Provincial Public Security Department; 2013–2017	Succeeded by Liu Yang
Party political offices
Preceded by Li Xiaomin	Secretary of the Jiangsu Provincial Politics and Law Commission; 2015–2020	Succeeded by Fei Gaoyun
