= Romantic Energy =

敦煌 Romantic Energy

Studio album by Twelve Girls Band
- Released: 27 September 2005

Twelve Girls Band chronology
Eastern Energy (2004)	敦煌; Romantic Energy (2005)	上海; Shanghai (2007)

Professional ratings
Review scores
Source	Rating
AllMusic	3.5/5 stars

Dunhuang ~ Romantic Energy (敦煌) is an album by Twelve Girls Band. It consists of seventeen songs in a sort of modernized Chinese form. It was released in 2005.

== Track listing ==
1. "Dunhuang"
2. "El Condor Pasa"
3. "Ruten"
4. "Whispering Earth"
5. "Romantic Energy"
6. "From the Beginning Till Now"
7. "Yangguan"
8. "Carnival"
9. "Fairies of Yardan"
10. "Ihojin"
11. "Flower" (Orange Range)
12. "River Shule"
13. "Mogao Grottoes"
14. "Yueya Spring"
15. "Tang Court Ensemble"
16. "Ten-sided Ambush"
17. "Lovers"

== US track listing ==
The version of the album released in the United States (by Muture Communications Inc) has an altered track order, and includes a 15-minute DVD.

1. "Dunhuang"
2. "Ruten"
3. "River Shule"
4. "Romantic Energy"
5. "El Condor Pasa"
6. "Tang Court Ensemble"
7. "From the Beginning Till Now"
8. "Yangguan"
9. "Whispering Earth"
10. "Flower"
11. "Carnival"
12. "Freedom" (live)

The DVD consists of:

1. "Ruten" (live)
2. "Carnival" (live)
3. "Dunhuang" (music video)

== Personnel ==
- Jianfeng Liang – Producer
- Hajime Nagai – Engineer
- Jun Li – Engineer
- Zhemin Lin – Engineer
- Yu Liu – Engineer
- Shigeki Kashii – Mixing Engineer
- Jun Li – Mixing Engineer
- Tinyau Hung – Mixing Engineer

Additional Personnel

- Eiichi Naito – Executive Producer, Management (USA)
- Dino Malito – A&R
- Hitoshi Saito – Marketing
- Kio Griffith – Art Direction & Design
