= Li Xiaomin =

Chinese politician

Li Xiaomin (Chinese: 李小敏; born May 1959) is a Chinese politician currently serving as the Chinese Communist Party Committee Secretary of Wuxi, and a member of the Jiangsu Provincial Party Standing Committee.

Li was born in Laiyang, Shandong province. He joined the Chinese Communist Party in 1982. He graduated from Nanjing University, where he majored in European capitalism and social development history. He later became involved in politics, serving in a series of roles in the Organization Department of the Jiangsu provincial party committee, before being elevated to deputy head of the department, then deputy secretary-general of the provincial government, then vice governor of Jiangsu. In March 2011 he was named a member of the provincial Party Standing Committee and the Secretary of the provincial Political and Legal Affairs Commission (Zhengfawei). On March 30, 2015, he was named CCP Committee Secretary of Wuxi, one of the most important cities in southern Jiangsu; he eventually relinquished his Zhengfawei (Central Political and Legal Affairs Commission) post to Wang Like.

Li became Vice-Chairman of the Jiangsu People's Congress on January 17, 2019.

Party political offices
Preceded by Huang Lixin	Communist Party Secretary of Wuxi; 2015– 2019	Succeeded by Huang Qin
