= Zhao Shaolin =

Chinese politician

Zhao Shaolin 赵少麟

Secretary General of Jiangsu Provincial Party Committee
- In office June 1998 – November 2006
- Preceded by: Liang Baohua
- Succeeded by: Li Yunfeng

Communist Party Secretary of Huaiyin
- In office September 1994 – November 1997

Mayor of Huaiyin
- In office September 1992 – May 1995

Personal details
- Born: October 1946 (age 79–80) Yuanping City, Shanxi
- Party: Chinese Communist Party (expelled)
- Children: Zhao Jin (son)
- Education: Harbin Institute of Military Engineering
- Profession: Radio engineer

Zhao Shaolin
- Traditional Chinese: 趙少麟
- Simplified Chinese: 赵少麟
Transcriptions
Standard Mandarin
- Hanyu Pinyin: Zhào Shàolín

Zhao Shaolin (born October 1946) is a former Chinese politician who spent most of his career in Jiangsu province. Beginning in the 1990s, Zhao served as the mayor, then Communist Party Secretary, of the city of Huaiyin (now Huai'an). In 1998, he became the Secretary General of the Jiangsu provincial Party Committee, in charge of the execution of provincial party policy. He retired from politics in November 2006. Subsequently, he became vice-president of the non-profit China Aging Development Foundation. He was investigated by the Communist Party's anti-graft body in 2014 for corruption, then expelled from the Communist Party; he faces criminal charges related to bribery and foreign exchange fraud.

== Biography ==
Zhao was born and raised in Yuanping City, Shanxi province, during the Republic of China.

In 1965, he entered the Harbin Institute of Military Engineering (哈尔滨军事工程学院), majoring in radio measurement, after graduating in 1970 he was assigned to Nanjing Bridge Machinery Works (南京大桥机器厂).

He became involved in politics in August 1965 and joined the Chinese Communist Party in April 1973.

Beginning in 1982, he served in several posts in Nanjing, capital of Jiangsu province, including party chief of Gulou District, and Deputy Party Secretary and Secretary General of the Nanjing Party Committee.

In September 1992, he became the Deputy Party Secretary and Mayor of Huaiyin; he was re-elected in 1993. He was elevated to party chief of Huaiyin in 1994.

In June 1998, he was promoted to become the Secretary General of the provincial party committee, and a provincial Party Standing Committee member. He was re-elected in March 2000, and began his third term in April 2003.

In December 2006, he became the First Vice-president of the China Aging Development Foundation (中国老龄事业发展基金会).

== Investigation ==
On October 11, 2014, the state media reported that he was being investigated by the Central Commission for Discipline Inspection (CCDI) of the Chinese Communist Party for "serious violations of laws and regulations".

On August 14, 2015, Zhao was expelled from the Chinese Communist Party after investigation by the CCDI. It was said that Zhao violated "political discipline, political rules, and organizational discipline, formed cliques within the party." The CCDI also accused Zhao of unduly aiding in the business interests of his son and visiting "private clubs", attending banquets to give cash gifts and give bribes along with his son. He was indicted on two criminal charges: bribery and fraudulent purchase of foreign exchange.

Zhao was sentenced to four years in prison and fined 15 million yuan (US$2.19 million) on May 18, 2017.

== Personal life ==
Zhao's son, Zhao Jin (赵晋), was a businessman who worked in Tianjin.
