= Shi Taifeng =

Chinese politician (born 1956)

- 石泰峰
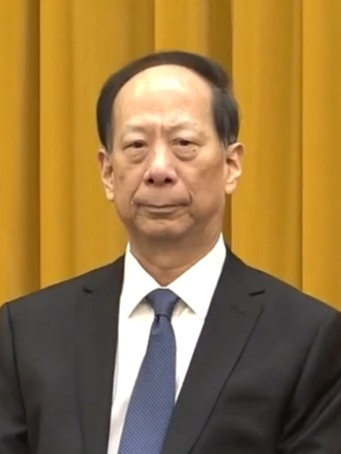
- Shi in 2025

Vice Chairman of the Chinese People's Political Consultative Conference
- Incumbent
- Assumed office 10 March 2023
- Chairman: Wang Huning

Head of the Organization Department of the Chinese Communist Party
- Incumbent
- Assumed office 2 April 2025
- Deputy: Jiang Xinzhi (Executive)
- General Secretary: Xi Jinping
- Preceded by: Li Ganjie

Head of the United Front Work Department of the Chinese Communist Party
- In office 27 October 2022 – 2 April 2025
- Deputy: Chen Xiaojiang (Executive)
- General Secretary: Xi Jinping
- Preceded by: You Quan
- Succeeded by: Li Ganjie

President of the Chinese Academy of Social Sciences
- In office May 2022 – 28 December 2022
- Preceded by: Xie Fuzhan
- Succeeded by: Gao Xiang

Party Secretary of Inner Mongolia
- In office 25 October 2019 – 30 April 2022
- Preceded by: Li Jiheng
- Succeeded by: Sun Shaocheng

Party Secretary of Ningxia
- In office 26 April 2017 – 25 October 2019
- Preceded by: Li Jianhua
- Succeeded by: Chen Run'er

Governor of Jiangsu
- In office 30 December 2015 – 31 May 2017
- Preceded by: Li Xueyong
- Succeeded by: Wu Zhenglong

Personal details
- Born: September 1956 (age 70) Yushe County, Shanxi, China
- Party: Chinese Communist Party
- Education: Peking University

Shi Taifeng (Chinese: 石泰峰; pinyin: Shí Tàifēng; born September 1956) is a Chinese politician currently serving as the head of the Organization Department of the Central Committee of the Chinese Communist Party (CCP) and the first-ranking vice chairperson of the Chinese People's Political Consultative Conference (CPPCC). He is additionally a member of the CCP Politburo and a secretary of the CCP Secretariat.

Originally from Shanxi province, Shi spent part of his career at the Central Party School. He has served as the Deputy Party secretary of Jiangsu from 2011 to 2015. From 2014 to 2016, he has served as the Party secretary of Suzhou, and as the governor of Jiangsu from 2015 to 2017. He was then moved to Ningxia, where he served as the CCP secretary from 2017 to 2019, and later to Inner Mongolia, where he served as the CCP secretary from 2019 to 2022. He also briefly served as the President of the Chinese Academy of Social Sciences in 2022.

Shi became a member of the Politburo and the head of the United Front Work Department (UFWD) in 2022. He was further promoted as the first-ranking CPPCC vice chairperson in 2023. In 2025, he was appointed as head of the Organization Department.

== Early life ==
Shi Taifeng was born in Yushe County, Shanxi, in 1956. During the Cultural Revolution he was a sent-down youth in his home county, performing manual labour. He then studied machinery at a local college before entering the work force as a factory worker. Following the resumption of the National College Entrance Exams, Shi was admitted to Peking University and obtained a master's degree in law. There, he was a classmate of Li Keqiang, who later became the Premier. After graduation, he served as a political instructor at the Central Party School, where he primarily taught law.

== Political career ==
He worked as the deputy party chief of Jin County, Hebei, before joining the research office of the Central Party School, then heading the Organization Department of the school. He spent about a year studying abroad at the University of Amsterdam in the Netherlands in 1991. In July 2001, Shi was named vice president of the Central Party School.

In 2008, Shi became a member of the Standing Committee of the National People's Congress, a member of the Law Committee of the NPC. In September 2010 he joined the provincial Party Standing Committee and became head of the Organization Department of the Jiangsu party organization. He subsequently was elevated to deputy party chief of Jiangsu province. In 2012, Shi elected alternate of the Central Committee of the CCP by the 18th CCP National Congress.

In June 2014 he began serving concurrently as the party secretary of Suzhou, an important city on the Yangtze River Delta and an area of high concentration for manufacturing and foreign investment. During this time it was said that Shi honed his credentials as 'first-in-charge' of a major city, in preparation for his taking higher office. In December 2015, after a series of consultative meetings, Shi Taifeng was elevated to acting Governor of Jiangsu province, replacing Li Xueyong, who retired due to age. He was duly confirmed as governor by a full session of the provincial People's Congress on January 28, 2016.

In April 2017, Shi was appointed the Party Secretary of Ningxia.

In October 2019, Shi was appointed the Party Secretary of Inner Mongolia. During his tenure, Shi was in charge of the anti-corruption campaign in Inner Mongolia, with more than 60 senior local officials falling under him. In 2020, Shi also mandated some school subjects should be taught in Mandarin Chinese, rather than Mongolian, leading to the eruption of protests. In November 2020, amidst the protests, Shi visited Xilingol League, saying there was a "major problem" in the promotion of the use of the national curriculum and called on officials to reflect on their mistakes.

In May 2022, he was appointed the president and party secretary of the Chinese Academy of Social Sciences, succeeding Xie Fuzhan.

=== Politburo ===
Following the 1st Plenary Session of the 20th CCP Central Committee, held after the closing day of the 20th Party Congress in October 2022, Shi was promoted as a member of the Politburo. On 28 October 2022, Shi was appointed head of the United Front Work Department, succeeding You Quan. Shi was elected as the first-ranking vice chairperson of the Chinese People's Political Consultative Conference on 10 March 2023. On 11 September, he was chosen as the executive vice president of the China Council for the Promotion of Peaceful National Reunification, a body designed to advance unification with Taiwan; the UFWD director also generally serves as the executive vice president of the council.

In August 2024, Shi made an inspection trip to Hong Kong, where he met with Chief Executive John Lee Ka-chiu. He also gave a speech to the Overseas Chinese World Conference for Promoting Peaceful Reunification of China held in Hong Kong, saying the "continuous development" of one country, two systems would play an "important role in realizing the complete reunification of the motherland" with Taiwan. On 2 April 2025, South China Morning Post reported that Shi had succeeded Li Ganjie as the head of the Organization Department, while Li replaced Shi as the head of the United Front Work Department. On 13 December, at the Nanjing Massacre Memorial Day, Shi gave a speech saying that under the leadership of the CCP, China had beaten invaders and become a great nation, continuing by saying that "History has proven and will continue to prove that any attempt to revive militarism, challenge the postwar international order, and undermine world peace and stability is doomed to failure".

Government offices
Preceded by Li Xueyong	Governor of Jiangsu; 2015–2017	Succeeded by Wu Zhenglong
Party political offices
Preceded by Li Jiheng	Party Secretary of Inner Mongolia; 2019–2022	Succeeded by Sun Shaocheng
Preceded by Li Jianhua	Party Secretary of Ningxia; 2017–2019	Succeeded by Chen Run'er
Preceded by Jiang Hongkun	Party Secretary of Suzhou; 2014–2016	Succeeded by Zhou Naixiang
Preceded by Zhu Shanlu	Deputy Party Secretary of Jiangsu; 2011–2015	Succeeded by Wu Zhenglong
Academic offices
Preceded by Xie Fuzhan	President of the Chinese Academy of Social Sciences; 2022	Succeeded by Gao Xiang
Order of precedence
Preceded by Wang Yi as Member of the Politburo of the Chinese Communist Party	Order of precedence of China as Member of the Politburo of the Chinese Communist Party	Succeeded by Yin Li as Member of the Politburo of the Chinese Communist Party
