= Eastern Energy =

Studio album by Twelve Girls Band
- Released: August 17, 2004
- Genre: Classical crossover
- Length: 64:15
- Label: Platia Entertainment
- Producer: Liang Jianfeng

Twelve Girls Band chronology
辉煌; Shining Energy (2004)	Eastern Energy (2004)	敦煌; Romantic Energy (2005)

Eastern Energy is an album by Twelve Girls Band. It consists of fourteen songs in a sort of modernized Chinese form on one audio CD and a DVD featuring the video for the song "Freedom" and other material. It was released on Platia 72438-64515-0-7 in 2004. This album is also considered as the debut album in USA. It debuted at #62 on the Billboard 200.

The track "New Classicism" is a modern-day medley of Symphony No. 40 in G Minor by Wolfgang Amadeus Mozart, Symphony No. 5 in C Minor by Ludwig van Beethoven, and the overture to The Barber of Seville by Gioacchino Rossini. "Freedom" is a remake of Santuri Ethem Efendi's Şehnaz Longa. "Clocks" is an innovative version of the Coldplay song of the same name and "Only Time" a cover of the single by Enya. "Reel Around the Sun" is from the Riverdance dance performance particularly popular in the late 1990s.

Professional ratings
Review scores
Source	Rating
Allmusic	3/5 stars

== Track listing ==
1. "Miracle"
2. "Clocks" (cover of "Clocks" by Coldplay)
3. "Liu San Jie" (based on a Chinese story of a girl who became a fairy)
4. "Earthly Stars (Unsung Heroes)"
5. "Freedom" (Santuri Ethem Efendi: Şehnaz Longa)
6. "Shangri-La" (from James Hilton's novel and the city of Beijing)
7. "Reel Around The Sun" (Riverdance)
8. "A Girl's Dream"
9. "Forbidden City" (From James Hilton's novel and the city of Beijing)
10. "The Great Valley"
11. "Alamuhan"
12. "Mountains and Rivers"
13. "Only Time" (cover of "Only Time" by Enya)
14. "New Classicism" (Wolfgang Amadeus Mozart: Symphony No. 40 in G Minor & Ludwig van Beethoven : Symphony No. 5 in C Minor)
