= Wu Zhenglong =

Chinese politician (born 1964)

- 吴政隆

State Councilor of China
- Incumbent
- Assumed office 12 March 2023 Serving with Wang Xiaohong and Shen Yiqin
- Premier: Li Qiang

14th Secretary-General of the State Council
- Incumbent
- Assumed office 12 March 2023
- Premier: Li Qiang
- Preceded by: Xiao Jie

Party Secretary of Jiangsu
- In office 18 October 2021 – 28 December 2022
- Deputy: Xu Kunlin (Governor)
- Preceded by: Lou Qinjian
- Succeeded by: Xin Changxing

Chairman of Jiangsu People's Congress
- In office 23 January 2022 – January 2023
- Preceded by: Lou Qinjian
- Succeeded by: Xin Changxing

Governor of Jiangsu
- In office 31 May 2017 – 19 October 2021
- Preceded by: Shi Taifeng
- Succeeded by: Xu Kunlin

Party Secretary of Nanjing
- In office October 2016 – May 2017
- Preceded by: Huang Lixin
- Succeeded by: Zhang Jinghua

Party Secretary of Taiyuan
- In office September 2014 – October 2016
- Preceded by: Chen Chuanping
- Succeeded by: Wang Weizhong

Personal details
- Born: November 1964 (age 61) Gaochun County, Jiangsu
- Party: Chinese Communist Party
- Education: Taiyuan Machinery College

Chinese name
- Simplified Chinese: 吴政隆
- Traditional Chinese: 吳政隆
Transcriptions
Standard Mandarin
- Hanyu Pinyin: Wú Zhènglóng

Wu Zhenglong (Chinese: 吴政隆; born November 1964) is a Chinese politician and who is currently a state councilor and the secretary-general of the State Council. Previously, he was the Governor of Jiangsu and also served as Chinese Communist Party Committee Secretary of Nanjing and Jiangsu. Born in Jiangsu, Wu served in Chongqing, then Shanxi, earlier in his career, before being transferred back to his home province, where he experienced a series of rapid promotions.

== Biography ==
Wu was born in Gaochun County, Jiangsu province. He graduated in 1984 from the Taiyuan Mechanical College (later renamed North University of China), where he studied machinery and equipment manufacturing, and worked in the military supply and industry ministry, before being transferred to the National Planning Commission to work as a political secretary. In 1999 he became deputy secretary-general of the Chongqing municipal government shortly after it became a direct-controlled municipality; he was then named deputy governor of Wanzhou District, then governor, then the party chief. Considered a "political survivor" in Chongqing, Wu served in the administration of then Chongqing party chief Bo Xilai, who was ousted in 2012. In May 2013 Wu was named secretary-general of the party committee, and a member of the CCP provincial standing committee of Chongqing.

In 2014, Chen Chuanping was abruptly removed from office as party chief of Taiyuan as part of a corruption probe. Wu was 'parachuted' in as the new party chief of Taiyuan in August 2014; he also earned an ex officio seat on the provincial party standing committee. Wu served in Shanxi for two years, before being transferred back to his home province of Jiangsu to take on the post of deputy party chief and party chief of the provincial capital Nanjing, a clear promotion and indication that he was being groomed to higher office. In May 2017, Wu was appointed acting Governor of Jiangsu. On 18 October 2021, he was promoted to Chinese Communist Party Committee Secretary of Jiangsu, the top political position in province.

Wu was a delegate to the 11th National People's Congress, elected in 2008. Wu was an alternate of the 18th Central Committee of the Chinese Communist Party and a full member of the 19th Central Committee.

Party political offices
Preceded by Chen Chuanping	Party Secretary of Taiyuan; 2014–2016	Succeeded by Wang Weizhong
Preceded by Shi Taifeng	Deputy Party Secretary of Jiangsu; 2016–2017	Succeeded by Huang Lixin
Preceded by Huang Lixin	Party Secretary of Nanjing; 2016–2017	Succeeded by Zhang Jinghua
Preceded by Lou Qinjian	Party Secretary of Jiangsu; 2021–2022	Succeeded by Xin Changxing
Assembly seats
Preceded by Lou Qinjian	Chairman of Jiangsu People's Congress; 2022–2023	Succeeded by Xin Changxing
Government offices
Preceded by Shi Taifeng	Governor of Jiangsu; 2017–2021	Succeeded by Xu Kunlin
Preceded by Xiao Jie	Secretary-General of the State Council; 2023–present	Incumbent
