= Bu Yu =

Chinese politician

Bu Yu (born in September 1965, Chinese: 卜宇), a native of Xiangshui, Jiangsu, is a politician in the People's Republic of China.

== Biography ==
Bu Yu became a member of the Chinese Communist Party (CCP) in June 1986. From July 1987 to October 1997, he held the positions of chief editor, deputy director, and editor of the Theory and Commentary Department at the Nanjing Daily. He was the editor-in-chief of the Nanjing Daily Newspaper, deputy director of the Nanjing Daily Newspaper Group, and CCP Deputy Committee Secretary in January 2007. In December 2011, he held the positions of station director, chairman of the board of directors, and CCP Committee Secretary at the Nanjing Broadcasting Television Group. He was the CCP Committee secretary, director, and chairman of the board of directors of Nanjing Radio and Television Group in December 2011. He was serving as the CCP Committee secretary, director, and chairman of the board of directors of Jiangsu Radio and Television Corporation (Group) in April 2012. In 2014, he received the 13th Changjiang Taofen Award.

Additionally, he was the dean of the School of Journalism and Communication at Nanjing University. He was the vice-chairman of the Ninth Committee of the Literature Federation of Jiangsu Province in April 2015. He was the vice-chairman of the seventh board of directors of the Jiangsu Provincial Journalists Association in November 2015. He was a member of the 13th Jiangsu Provincial Committee of the Chinese Communist Party in November 2016.

In 2017, he served as the sixth vice-chairman of the China Association of Television and Radio Broadcasting (Group) of Jiangsu Province. He was also the CCP Committee Secretary, director, chairperson of the board of directors, and dean of the School of Journalism and Communication at Nanjing University.

In July 2020, Bu Yu was elected as the new Chairman of Jiangsu Provincial Television Association. He was the deputy director of the Committee of Professional Ethics Construction in Television Sector of the China Television Association in December 2020. He was the director of the Press Office of the Jiangsu Provincial Government from June 2022 to March 2023.
