= Twelve Girls Band =

Chinese band

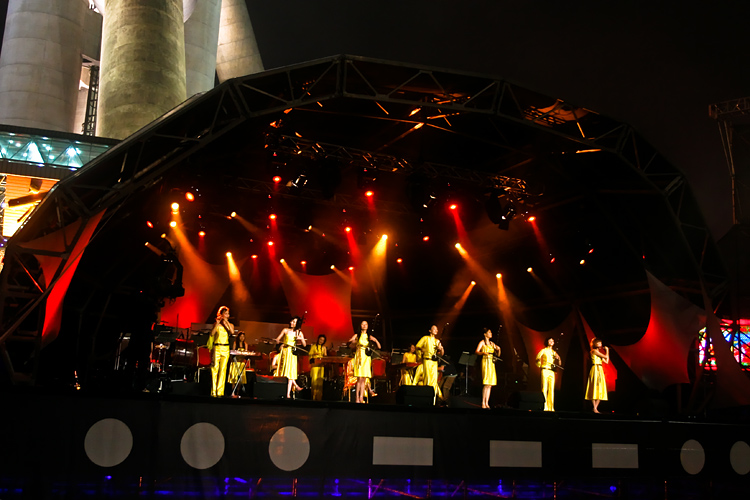
- 12 Girls Band performing in 2007

Background information
- Origin: Beijing, China
- Genres: Classical crossover; Traditional; electronica
- Instrument: Traditional Chinese instruments
- Years active: 2001–present
- Label: MCA
- Website: www.12girls.org

12 Girls Band or Twelve Girls Band (simplified Chinese: 女子十二乐坊; traditional Chinese: 女子十二樂坊; pinyin: Nǚzǐ shí'èr Yùefǎng, sometimes abbreviated to 女樂 or 女乐) are an all-female Chinese musical group that initially consisted of twelve members before the addition of a thirteenth. Twelve Girls Band use traditional Chinese instruments to play both traditional Chinese and Western music. Formed on June 18, 2001, the women were selected by audition from more than 4,000 contestants. Each woman is classically-trained, and the band members come from various conservatories in the People's Republic of China (PRC), including the China Academy of Music, the Chinese National Orchestra, and the Central Conservatory of Music.

== History ==
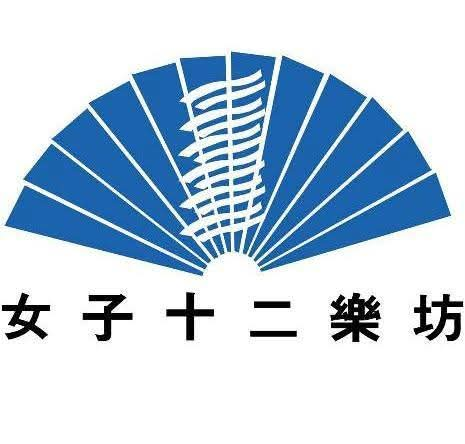
Twelve Girls Band's official logo

Chinese numerology gave Wang Xiao-Jing the idea for the Twelve Girls Band. When Xiao-Jing decided he wanted to create a female ensemble, he knew it needed 12 members. Per Chinese mythology it is the twelve jinchai (12 hairpins) representing womanhood. For the new project, the women were inspired by the art of the Yue Fang, the ensembles who played in the Tang dynasty courts during the years AD 618 to 907. He wanted to update traditional Chinese music for today's audiences.

The group debuted their modern compositions on ancient instruments in China and Japan during the Northern summer of 2003. In Japan, their debut album topped the charts for 30 weeks. Their debut album, entitled Eastern Energy, was released in North America in August 2004 with cover versions of Coldplay's "Clocks" and Enya's "Only Time" included, and a television advertising campaign announcing the group's arrival.

In June 2020, the group released the album Shining Energy in Hong Kong.

In 2011, the group disbanded. Some of the members still performed in some small concerts. In 2010, Yin Yan released a music video "I Can't Be Your Man" in which she played solo erhu.

The manager describes the music of the group as "visual music".

== Performances ==
=== Original ===
==== 2001 to 2011 ====
In July 2003, Beautiful Energy, their first album in Japan, reached the top of the J-pop chart. They won Japan Gold Disc Award in 2004.

The Twelve Girls Band toured in the United States in 2004 Miracles tour and again in 2005.

On July 7, 2007, the Twelve Girls Band performed at the Chinese leg of Live Earth in Shanghai, and were accompanied by the Mexican folk singer Lila Downs.

The Italian soprano Giorgia Fumanti performed with the group in October and November 2007, on their North American tour. The tour traveled to the Midwest, and the East and West Coast areas of the USA and Canada.

=== New line-ups ===
==== 2012 to present ====
In 2012, a new line-up was created and they still do concerts to the present.

== Discography ==
=== Studio albums ===
- Meili Yinyuehui 魅力音乐会 (CD, 2001 – limited Press) – debut CD
- Joshi Juni Gakubou – Beautiful Energy (CD, VCD and DVD, 2003) – first Japanese album
- Kikou - Shining Energy - (CD, CASSETTE and DVD, 2004) – second Japanese album
- Eastern Energy (CD and DVD, 2004) – first US album
- Tonkou – Romantic Energy - (CD, CASSETTE and DVD, 2005)
- Romantic Energy (CD and DVD, 2005) – published in the US
- My Chinese Heart EP – Great Wall of China (CD and MV, 2006) – China EP only
- Shanghai (CD and CASSETTE, 2007)
- "Beautiful and Shining" – 15th anniversary album (CD, 2016)
- "Perfect Best" (2010) (CD) – published in Japan
- 灵感 (2011) (CD) -

=== Live albums ===
- Kiseki/Miracle Live (CD, CASSETTE, DVD and VCD, 2003)
- Twelve Girls Band Live at Japan 2003 (DVD, 2003)
- Twelve Girls Band Live at Budokan Japan 2004 (CD and DVD, 2004)
- Twelve Girls Band Live at Japan 2004 (CD and DVD, 2004) – 1st Anniversary Concert
- Twelve Girls Band Live at NHK, Japan 2004 (SPECIAL PROGRAM, 2004)
- Romantic Energy Concert Live at Tokyo, Japan (DVD, 2005)
- Journey to Silk Road (CD, DVD and VCD, 2005)
- Instant Live (CD, 2005) – First U.S tour
- 同歡共樂賀新年 (CD, DVD and VCD, 2006) – Happy New Year Concert with other artists
- 5th Anniversary Concert (DVD, 2006)
- Live From Shanghai (DVD, 2007)
