= Zhu Zhaoliang =

Chinese scientist and politician (1932–2022)

- 朱兆良
- Born: 21 August 1932; Qingdao, Shandong, China
- Died: 30 January 2022 (aged 89); Nanjing, Jiangsu, China
- Education: Shandong University
- Scientific career
- Fields: Pedology
- Workplaces: Institute of Soil Science, Chinese Academy of Sciences (ISSAS)

Zhu Zhaoliang (Chinese: 朱兆良; pinyin: Zhū Zhàoliáng; 21 August 1932 – 30 January 2022) was a Chinese scientist and politician who was a researcher at the Institute of Soil Science, Chinese Academy of Sciences (ISSAS), a vice president of the Jiangsu Provincial Committee of the Chinese People's Political Consultative Conference, and an academician of the Chinese Academy of Sciences. He was a member of the Standing Committee of the 9th and 10th Chinese People's Political Consultative Conferences.

== Biography ==
Zhu was born in Qingdao, Shandong, on 21 August 1932, while his ancestral home was in Fenghua, Zhejiang. In 1949, he was accepted by Shandong University, where he successively studied at the Department of Agronomy and Department of Chemistry. After graduating in 1953, he was despatched to the Institute of Soil Science, Chinese Academy of Sciences (ISSAS), where he was promoted to associate research fellow in May 1978 and to research fellow in June 1986. In February 1994, he joined the Chinese Peasants' and Workers' Democratic Party, and became its vice chairman in October 1997. In February 1998, he was proposed as vice chairman of the Jiangsu Provincial Committee of the Chinese People's Political Consultative Conference. He died in Nanjing, Jiangsu on 30 January 2022, at the age of 89.

== Honours and awards ==
- 1993 Member of the Chinese Academy of Sciences (CAS)

== Bibliography ==
- Mu Yaqin (慕亚芹); Li Qun (李群) (2020). 思地虑粮六十载：朱兆良传 [Biography of Zhu Zhaoliang] (in Chinese). Beijing: China Science and Technology Press. ISBN 9787504683342.
