= Nanjing Daily =

Chinese Communist Party newspaper

- Type: Daily
- Owner(s): Nanjing Municipal Committee of the Chinese Communist Party
- Publisher: Nanjing Media Group
- Founded: March 15, 1956
- Political alignment: Chinese Communist Party
- Language: Chinese
- Headquarters: 223 Longpan Middle Road, Nanjing, Jiangsu Province
- Website: www.njdaily.cn

The Nanjing Daily (Chinese: 南京日报) is the official newspaper of the Nanjing Municipal Committee of the Chinese Communist Party. It was established on March 15, 1956.

== History ==
On March 15, 1956, Nanjing Daily launched as a four-page newspaper. The newspaper came to an end on February 11, 1961. The Nanjing Municipal Revolutionary Committee established the New Nanjing Newspaper on February 1, 1970, rebranded it as Nanjing Daily on June 19, 1971, and ceased publication in October. On January 1, 1978, the Nanjing Newsletter relaunched, and on July 2, 1979, it reverted to its original title of Nanjing Daily as a four-page publication. The newspaper underwent a conversion to a large folio format on January 1, 1986, and has been publishing weekly on Wednesdays since October 1992. The former name Nanjing Daily returned on July 1, 1979, transforming it into a four-page newspaper format. From January 1, 1986, the huge newspaper will include a folio, and from October 1992 forward, every Wednesday will feature an additional four-page "expanded edition." In 2005, Nanjing Daily underwent a restructuring to become an "urban newspaper" and initiated its retail operations.

The daily received recognition in 2018 as one of the top 100 newspapers in China for 2017.
