= Beautiful Energy =

Studio album by Twelve Girls Band
- Released: 2003

Beautiful Energy is the first album by Twelve Girls Band. It consists of fifteen songs played in a modernized Chinese form.

On 18 September 2003, the album surpassed one million copies sold.

== Track list ==
1. "Miracle"
2. "Freedom"
3. "Sekai ni Hitotsu Dake no Hana"
4. "Shangri-La"
5. "Take Five"
6. "Kawa no Nagare no Yō ni"
7. "A Girl's Dream"
8. "Alamuhan"
9. "Liu San Jie"
10. "Love Story wa Totsuzen ni"
11. "Mountains and Rivers"
12. "Hepbeat"
13. "Forbidden City"
14. "No Word"
15. "Chijo no Hoshi"
