= Yang Weize =

Chinese politician

- 杨卫泽
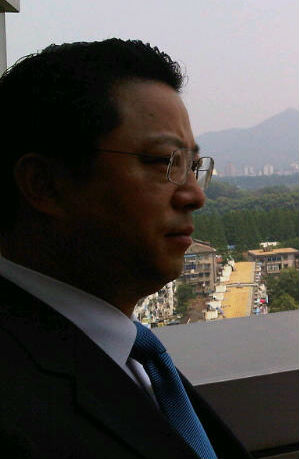

Party Secretary of Nanjing
- In office March 2011 – 8 January 2015
- Deputy: Ji Jianye (2011–2013); Miao Ruilin (2013–2015)
- Preceded by: Zhu Shanlu
- Succeeded by: Huang Lixin

Communist Party Secretary of Wuxi
- In office November 2004 – March 2011
- Preceded by: Wang Rong
- Succeeded by: Mao Xiaoping

Personal details
- Born: October 1962 (age 63) Nantong, Jiangsu, China
- Party: Chinese Communist Party (1988–2015, expelled)

Yang Weize (simplified Chinese: 杨卫泽; traditional Chinese: 楊衛澤; pinyin: Yáng Wèizé; born October 1962) is a former Chinese politician. He was the Party Secretary of Nanjing, capital of Jiangsu Province, from 2011 to 2015. Prior to that, he served as the party secretary in the neighbouring city of Wuxi for seven years, and before that the Mayor of Suzhou. In 2015, Yang was put under investigation for corruption by the Central Commission for Discipline Inspection. He was tried and convicted on corruption charges and sentenced to twelve years and six months in prison in December 2016.

== Career ==
Yang was born in Nantong, Jiangsu province in August 1962. He traces his ancestry to the Changzhou area. His father was a hospital administrator in the city of Nantong. Yang went to college at the Nanjing Marine Engineering Institute (南京航务工程专科学校), where he studied marine and seaport engineering. He began working in the Jiangsu provincial transportation department in August 1981. In 1998, he became the provincial director of transportation. The next year, he was transferred to become Deputy Party Secretary of Suzhou, and later Mayor. In 2004, Yang became the party secretary of Wuxi, becoming first-in-charge of the southern Jiangsu city. By 2006, at age 44, he had earned a seat on the provincial Party Standing Committee.

According to the Beijing Youth Daily, during Yang's term in Suzhou, he reportedly maintained close relations with the family of Zhou Yongkang, a former member of the powerful Politburo Standing Committee of the Chinese Communist Party, who was a native of the region. Yang was said to have received praise from Zhou for his work in controlling the razing of local residential neighbourhoods near Zhou's hometown. In 2011, he became the Party Secretary of the provincial capital Nanjing. Chinese language media have suggested that Yang was once subject to a formal disciplinary complaint by Gao Dezheng (高德正), former executive Vice Governor of Jiangsu and the father-in-law of Ji Jianye; Ji was Mayor of Nanjing during Yang's term as the city's party boss. As the city's two most prominent political leaders, Ji and Yang had an uneasy, often hostile relationship. Yang publicly criticized Ji over a rainwater diversion construction project in Nanjing led by the mayor. Ji was abruptly removed from his office of mayor (Shuanggui) in December 2013 to face a corruption investigation.

Yang also served as the president of the organizing committee of the 2014 Summer Youth Olympics, spearheading a strategy of using temporary venues for competition and spending frugally. Yang said, "No new venues will be built if old ones can be renovated, No new facilities will be purchased if old ones can be repaired, no equipment will be bought if (it) can be rented, and they won't be rented if they can be borrowed," echoing a famous phrase used by former President Liu Shaoqi.

Yang was an alternate member of the 18th Central Committee of the Chinese Communist Party.

=== Investigation ===
After the dismissal of Ji Jianye, rumours about Yang himself being "in trouble" began circulating in late 2013. For much of 2014, Yang executed the party's anti-corruption and "mass line" campaigns with great fervour in Nanjing, ostensibly as a display of loyalty to the new party leadership under CCP general secretary Xi Jinping. In addition, in preparation for the 2014 Summer Youth Olympics in Nanjing, Yang called upon the city to embrace the slogan, "work hard for one hundred days, clean up the environment." Between April and August, various "clean-up" initiatives took place across the city. During this time, Yang was said to have visited all the sporting venues and surrounding areas to ensure that work was being completed as planned. The "one hundred day clean-up" campaign earned Yang praise from local residents. In May, Yang said that Nanjing was open to the idea of hosting the 2019 Asian Games after organizers from Vietnam withdrew from hosting the event.

"Getting rid of Ji Jianye is like conducting surgery to remove a tumour. It might hurt in the short term but in the long run, the body will recover."

— Yang Weize, shortly after former Mayor Ji Jianye was detained for investigation.

In July 2014, state media announced the investigation into China's former security chief and Wuxi-area native Zhou Yongkang. In September 2014, Yang's friend and colleague Feng Yajun (冯亚军), then serving as the district party secretary of Jianye District and a member of the Nanjing Party Standing Committee, was detained for investigation. Several days later, Lou Xuequan (娄学全), former party secretary of Luhe District of Nanjing, committed suicide in his home. On December 13, the "National Commemoration Ceremony" for the Nanking Massacre took place in the city, attended by CCP general secretary Xi Jinping. Yang did not accompany Xi's subsequent visit to the Zhenjiang and Nanjing area. After the Commemoration Ceremony, Yang maintained an extremely low-profile, showing reluctance even when signing routine documents and pushing most work onto Mayor Miao Ruilin. On January 1, 2015, Yang took part in a long-distance running race to ring in the new year at the Nanjing City Wall. Those who attended the race reported that Yang looked extremely stressed and uneasy.

On January 4, 2015, Yang was detained by officials from the Central Commission for Discipline Inspection, the Party's internal anti-graft agency, on "suspected serious violations of displinary and law". His wife and deputy chief of staff was also reported to have been detained on the same day. Yang was chairing a "democratic life meeting" when he was informed by an assistant that his presence was immediately required at the provincial party headquarters. Yang promptly adjourned the meeting and made his way there. According to a Jiangsu party disciplinary official, upon realizing he was being apprehended by party disciplinary personnel, Yang attempted to kill himself by jumping out of a window at the provincial party headquarters but was ultimately restrained from doing so.

=== Expulsion and sentencing ===
Following an investigation by the Central Commission for Discipline Inspection, on July 31, 2015, Yang was expelled from the Chinese Communist Party. In an official statement, the CCDI accused Yang of "gravely violating organizational discipline, hiding personal information [from the authorities], accepting cash gifts, seeking gain for others using the convenience of his office [...] violating the Eight-point Regulation, frequenting high-end hotels and private clubs, accepting banquet invitations from others; using the convenience of his office to seek promotion or further business interests of others, and taking huge bribes." Of these offenses cited, most were merely violations of party discipline; however, bribery constituted a crime. Yang's case was forwarded to judicial authorities for prosecution.

On December 14, 2016, Yang Weize was sentenced for 12 years and 6 months in prison, having been convicted on charges of bribery by the Ningbo People's Intermediate Court. Two million yuan of personal assets were seized, and all of his earnings deemed to have come from corrupt sources were confiscated by the national treasury. The total value of bribes recorded by the court was 16.43 million yuan.

Party political offices
Preceded by Zhu Shanlu	Party Secretary of Nanjing; 2011–2015	Succeeded by Huang Lixin
Preceded by Wang Rong	Party Secretary of Wuxi; 2004–2011	Succeeded by Mao Xiaoping
