= Zhang Yizhen =

Chinese politician

- 张义珍

Chairwoman of the Jiangsu Provincial Committee of the Chinese People's Political Consultative Conference
- Incumbent
- Assumed office January 2022
- Preceded by: Huang Lixin

Personal details
- Born: August 1964 (age 62) Anguo County, Hebei, China
- Party: Chinese Communist Party
- Education: Agricultural University of Hebei; Huazhong Agricultural University

Chinese name
- Simplified Chinese: 张义珍
- Traditional Chinese: 張義珍
Transcriptions
Standard Mandarin
- Hanyu Pinyin: Zhāng Yìzhēn

Zhang Yizhen (Chinese: 张义珍; born August 1964) is a Chinese politician who is the current chairwoman of the Jiangsu Provincial Committee of the Chinese People's Political Consultative Conference, in office since January 2022. She is a representative of the 19th National Congress of the Chinese Communist Party.

== Biography ==
Zhang was born in Anguo County (now Anguo), Hebei, in August 1964. In 1980, she was admitted to the Agricultural University of Hebei, majoring in agricultural economic management. After graduation, she taught at the university. She also received her doctor's degree in agriculture from Huazhong Agricultural University in 1998. She served as deputy dean of the School of Economics and Management in January 1998, and was promoted to the dean position in December 2000. In August 2002, she rose to become vice president of the university.

Zhang joined the Chinese Communist Party (CCP) in November 1983, and got involved in politics in June 2004, when she was appointed deputy head of Organization Department of the CCP Hebei Provincial Committee. She was made deputy party secretary of Tangshan in December 2008, concurrently serving as head of Organization Department of the CCP Tangshan Municipal Committee since June 2009. In May 2010, she become executive deputy head of the United Front Work Department of the CCP Hebei Provincial Committee, a position he held until February 2012, when she was appointed head and party branch secretary of Hebei Provincial Human Resources and Social Security Department.

In July 2015, Zhang was transferred to Beijing and appointed vice minister of Human Resources and Social Security.

In February 2019, Zhang was assigned to south China's Guangdong province, where she took office as head of Organization Department of the CCP Guangdong Provincial Committee. She was also admitted to member of the standing committee of the CCP Guangdong Provincial Committee, the province's top authority.

In November 2021, Zhang was despatched to east China's Jiangsu province and appointed deputy party secretary, and two months later, she became chairwoman of the Jiangsu Provincial Committee of the Chinese People's Political Consultative Conference, the province's top political advisory body.

Government offices
Preceded by Fu Wencai (付文才)	Head of Hebei Provincial Human Resources and Social Security Department; 2012–2015	Succeeded by Wang Liang
Party political offices
Preceded by Zou Ming	Head of Organization Department of the CCP Guangdong Provincial Committee; 2019–2021	Succeeded by Zhang Fuhai
Preceded by Zhang Jinghua	Deputy Communist Party Secretary of Jiangsu; 2021–2022	Succeeded by TBA
Assembly seats
Preceded by Huang Lixin	Chairwoman of the Jiangsu Provincial Committee of the Chinese People's Political Consultative Conference; 2022–present	Incumbent
