= Gao Yihan =

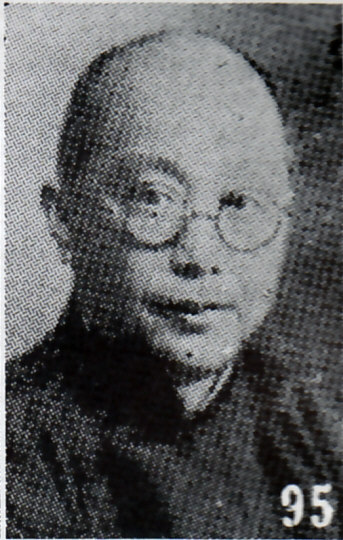
Gao Yihan as pictured in The Most Recent Biographies of Chinese Dignitaries

Gao Yihan (高一涵, P: Gāo Yīhán, W: Kao I-han, 1884–1968) was a Chinese intellectual and political scientist. In addition to holding both educational and governmental positions, he contributed often to the publications The Tiger and New Youth (Xin Qingnian) and is thereby associated with the New Culture Movement.

== Biography ==
In 1916, Gao Yihan graduated from Meiji University. Afterward he served as editor for the publications Morning Bell and Weekly Commentary. In addition to teaching political science at Peking University, he was a professor at Beijing University and a Law School dean at Nanjing University. His writing was often concerned with the nature of the state. He felt that a state should not be considered an inevitability and instead should be recognized as a construction of the people. He was disappointed in the nature of the state in China at the time, notably the rampant warlordism.

The ultimate goal of the state, Gao Yihan thought, should be to secure and protect individual rights. He greatly admired certain philosophies and politics of the west, notably Utilitarianism, and was also an individualist. His work for the Bureau of Translation in the Ministry of the Interior allowed him to compare governments in Britain, the United States, France, and Japan. In 1930 he published a comparative political textbook which included material from his past lectures.

Gao Yihan was a respected member of The Tiger for his contributions and he contributed a large number of them while the journal was still in its early stages. Gao Yihan's leanings were decidedly socialistic and he was in fact one of the first Chinese intellectuals to encourage the proliferation of economic rights. After the dissolution of The Tiger, Gao Yihan, like many of contemporaries, went on to write similarly for La Jeunesse.
