= Gao Xiang (historian) =

Chinese historian and politician

- 高翔
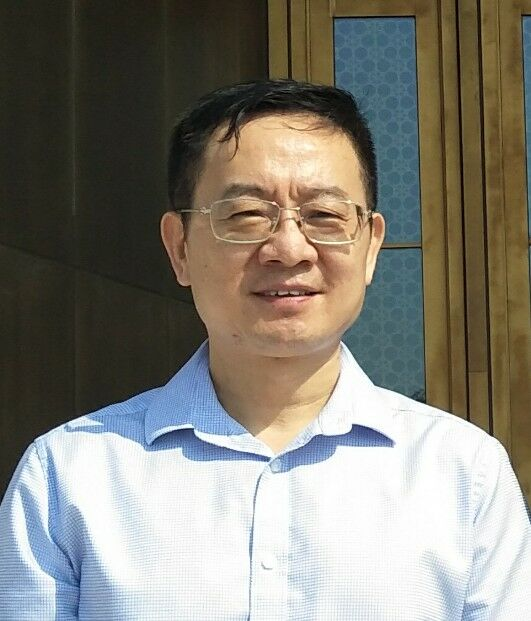
- Gao in August 2020

President of the Chinese Academy of Social Sciences
- Incumbent
- Assumed office December 2022
- Preceded by: Shi Taifeng

Director of the History Department, Chinese Academy of Social Sciences
- Incumbent
- Assumed office January 2019
- Preceded by: New title

Personal details
- Born: October 1963 (age 62–63) Nanbu County, Sichuan, China
- Party: Chinese Communist Party
- Education: Renmin University of China

Gao Xiang (Chinese: 高翔; pinyin: Gāo Xiáng; born October 1963) is a Chinese historian and politician, currently serving as Chinese Communist Party Committee Secretary and president of the Chinese Academy of Social Sciences (CASS) and president of the Chinese Academy of History.

He was a representative of the 19th National Congress of the Chinese Communist Party. He is a representative of the 20th National Congress of the Chinese Communist Party and a member of the 20th Central Committee of the Chinese Communist Party.

== Biography ==
Gao was born in Nanbu County, Sichuan, in October 1963, and graduated from Renmin University of China (RUC). He joined the Chinese Communist Party (CCP) in October 1994. He taught at RUC before being assigned to the Chinese Academy of Social Sciences (CASS) in November 1996. In July 2012, he became deputy secretary-general, rising to secretary-general the next year.

In March 2016, he was appointed head of Publicity Department of the CCP Fujian Provincial Committee and was admitted to member of the Standing Committee of the CCP Fujian Provincial Committee, the province's top authority. He also served as chairman of the Fujian Federation of Social Sciences.

He was appointed deputy director of the Office of the Central Network Security and Informatization Commission in December 2017, concurrently serving as deputy director of the State Internet Information Office.

In November 2018, he was recalled to CASS as vice president, in addition to serving as president of the Chinese Academy of History since January 2019. He was appointed CCP committee secretary and CASS president in late 2022.

== Publications ==
- 康雍乾三帝统治思想研究 [A Study on the Ruling Thought of the Three Emperors of Kangxi, Yongzheng and Qianlong] (in Chinese). Beijing: China Renmin University Press. 1995. ISBN 9787300020716.
- 在历史的深处 [In the Depth of History] (in Chinese). Beijing: China Social Sciences Press. 2012. ISBN 9787500498544.
- 近代的初曙 [Early Dawn of Modern Times] (in Chinese). Beijing: Social Science Literature Press. 2000. ISBN 9787801493798.

Party political offices
Preceded by Li Shulei	Head of Publicity Department of Fujian Provincial Committee of the Chinese Communist Party; 2016–2017	Succeeded by Liang Jianyong
Academic offices
New title	President of the Chinese Academy of History; 2021–	Incumbent
Preceded by Wang Jingqing	Executive Vice President of the Chinese Academy of Social Sciences; 2021–	Incumbent
