= Gao Juefu =

Chinese psychologist

Gao Juefu (Chinese: 高觉敷; pinyin: Gāo Juéfū; 1896–1993), also known as Gao Zhuo (高卓), was one of China's modern psychologists and a psychology historian.

He was born in Wenzhou, Zhejiang Province. When he was young, he studied at the Beijing Higher Normal School and the University of Hong Kong Department of Education.

He served as the Commercial Press editor, and the director of Education Department of XiangQin University in Guangdong, also the director of Sun Yat-sen Institute of Education. He worked as a professor in Fudan University. Once he was the vice chairman of Chinese Psychology and the Professor of Education in Nanjing Normal University. There is a statue of him in Nanjing Normal University.

He wrote many books and monographs during his whole life, such as Mass Psychology, Modern Psychology, Psychology Celebrity Biography, Educational Psychology, Psychology History Summary, Foreign Psychology, My Fifty Years of Work Psychology Recalls, and so on; translation of Psychoanalysis, Psychoanalysis New, History of Experimental Psychology, and so on. Additionally, there are 165 papers published in foreign newspapers.
