= North University of China =

Provincial public university in Taiyuan, Shanxi, China

- 中北大学
- Former names: Taihang Industrial School; North China Vocational School of Ordnance; Taiyuan Institute of Machinery
- Motto: 致知于行
- Type: Public
- Established: 1941
- President: Shen Xingquan
- Undergraduates: 30,000
- Postgraduates: 3,000
- Location: Taiyuan, Shanxi, China; 38.0094°N 112.436°E
- Campus: Suburban, 167 ha (410 acres)
- Website: nuc.edu.cn

The North University of China (中北大学; NUC) is a provincial public university in Jiancaoping, Taiyuan, Shanxi, China. It is affiliated with the Province of Shanxi, and co-funded by the Shanxi Provincial People's Government, the Ministry of Industry and Information Technology, and SASTIND.

In the mid-1900s, the school was known as the Taihang Industrial School (太行工业学校) from 1941 to 1949, the Ordnance Industry Vocational School (兵工职业学校) from 1949 to 1951, the China Northern Ordnance Industrial School (华北兵工工业学校) from 1951 to 1953, the China Northern Second Industrial School (华北第二工业学校) from 1953 to 1955, the Taiyuan First Industrial School (太原第一工业学校) from 1955 to 1956, the Taiyuan Machinery Manufacturing Industrial School (太原机械制造工业学校) from 1956 to 1958.

After that, with several reorganization and institutional incorporation, the school was known as the Taiyuan Machinery College (太原机械学院) from 1958 to 1993 and the North China Industrial School (华北工学院; official English name: North China Institute of Technology) from 1993 to 2004.

The university played an important role in the weaponry development and personnel training for the People's Liberation Army during the Second Sino-Japanese War and the Chinese Civil War. In 2001, Bo Yibo, a senior leader of the Communist Party and of the country, wrote the inscription "The First School for People's Ordnance Industry" (人民兵工第一校) for the 60th anniversary of the school.

== Administration ==
North University of China currently operates 7 postdoctoral research stations, with authorization to grant doctoral degrees in 9 first-level academic disciplines and 4 professional doctoral degree categories. It offers master's degrees in 26 first-level disciplines and 14 categories of professional master's programs, alongside 70 undergraduate majors. Twelve of its engineering programs have been accredited through the national engineering education certification system.

== Faculty and Students ==
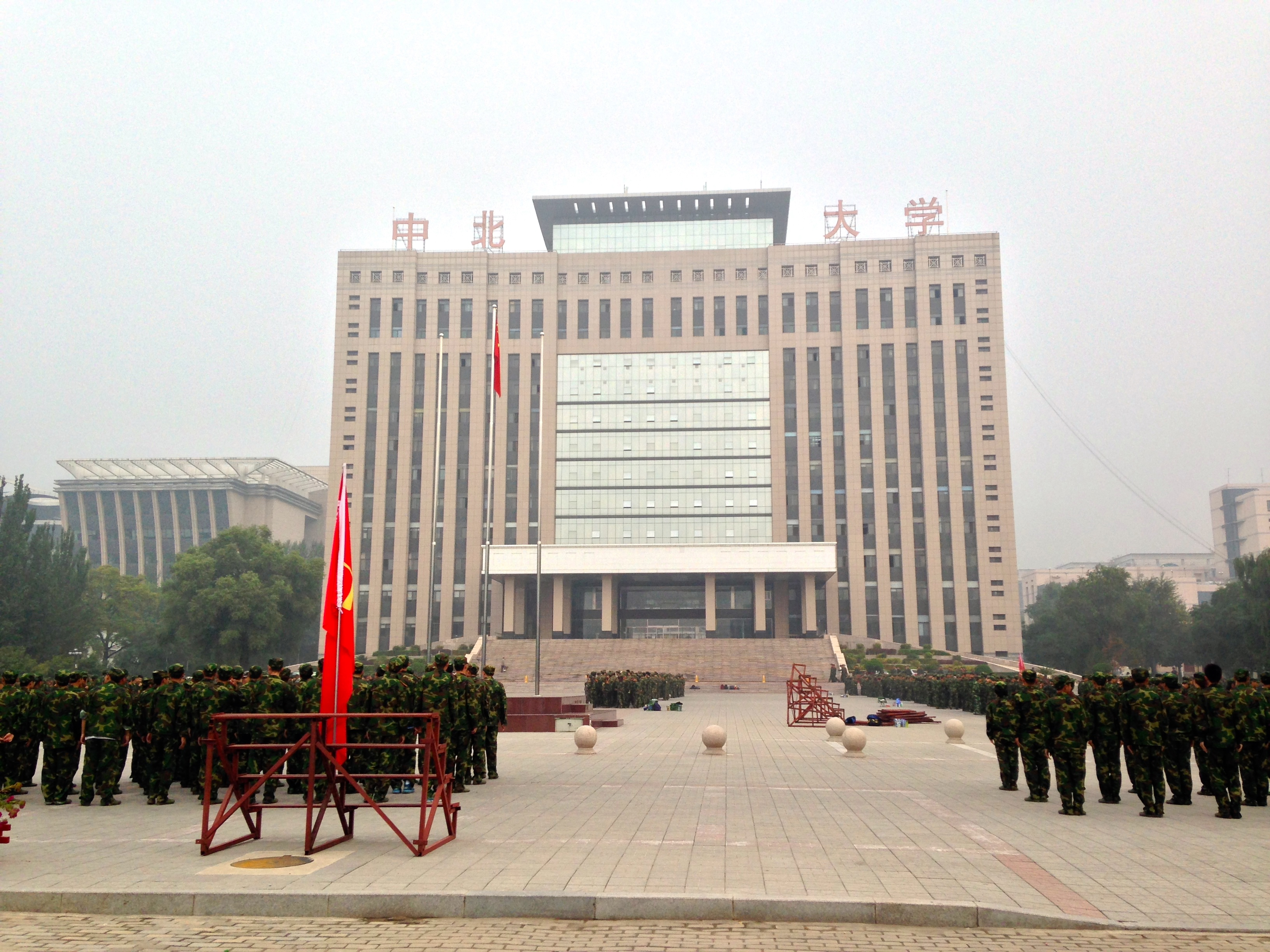
The North University of China

North University of China currently employs 2,927 faculty and staff members, including 2,108 full-time teachers. Among them are 318 professors and 718 associate professors, with 70.87% of the teaching staff holding doctoral degrees. The university is home to 72 high-level experts, including academicians of the Chinese Academy of Engineering and foreign members of the Russian Academy of Sciences and the Russian Academy of Engineering. Additionally, 44 faculty members are recipients of the State Council's Special Allowance, and 5 serve as members of national teaching advisory committees for higher education.

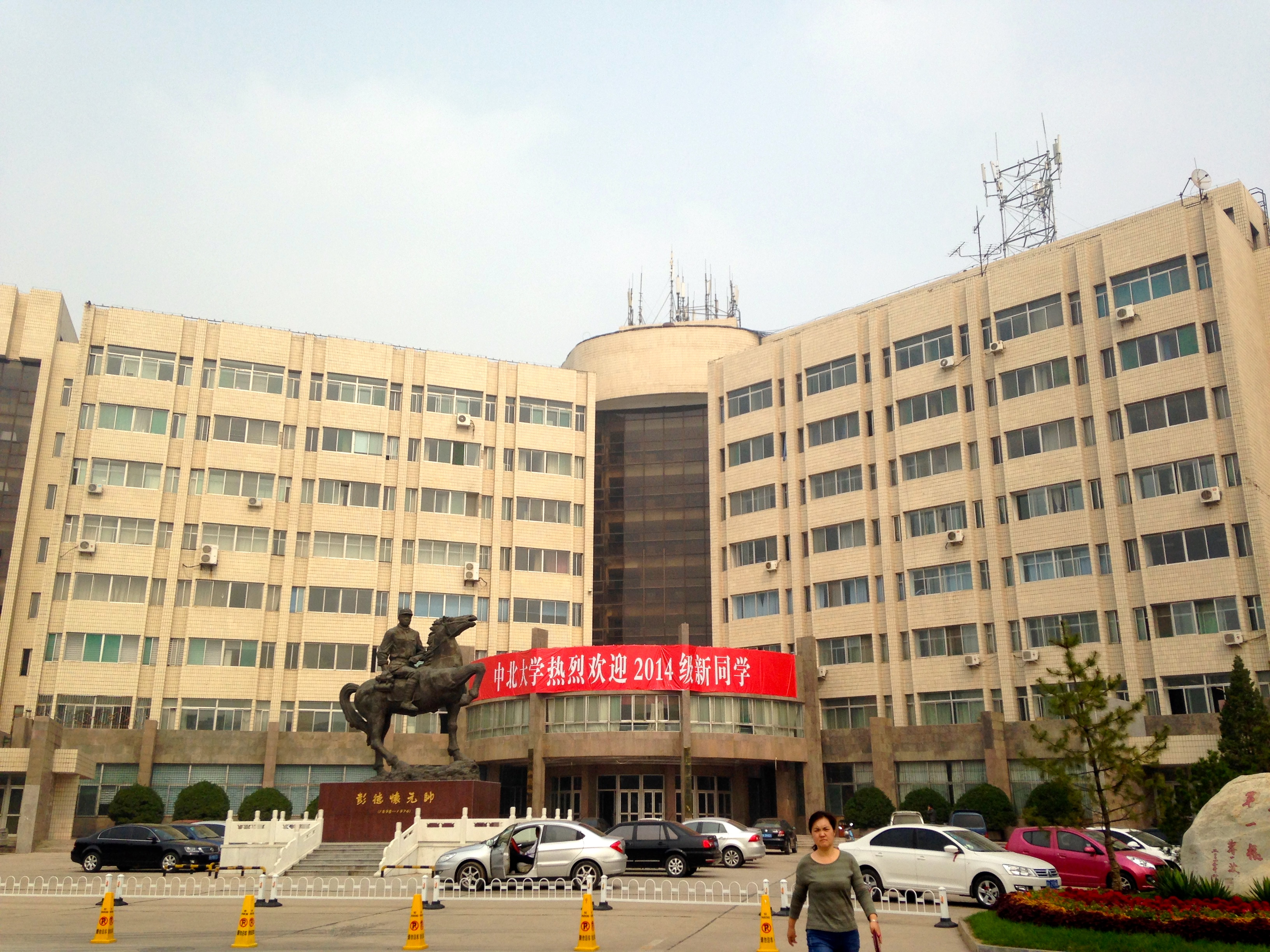

North University of China has a full-time student population of approximately 42,500, including 7,278 doctoral and master's degree candidates.

== See also ==
- List of universities in China
- National Key Disciplines
