= Cao Keming =

Chinese politician

- 曹克明

Director of the Chinese Society and Law Committee of the Chinese People's Political Consultative Conference
- In office March 2003 – March 2008
- Chairman: Jia Qinglin

Chairman of Jiangsu Provincial Committee of the Chinese People's Political Consultative Conference
- In office February 1998 – March 2003
- Preceded by: Sun Han (孙颔)
- Succeeded by: Xu Zhonglin (许仲林)

Deputy Secretary of the CPC Jiangsu Provincial Committee
- In office February 1991 – September 2001
- Secretary: Chen Huanyou

Secretary of Jiangsu Provincial Committee of the Central Commission for Discipline Inspection of the Chinese Communist Party
- In office July 1987 – September 2001

Personal details
- Born: November 1934 Nanyang, Henan, China
- Died: 2 September 2014 (aged 79) Nanjing, Jiangsu, China
- Party: Chinese Communist Party

Cao Keming (Chinese: 曹克明; pinyin: Cáo Kèmíng; November 1934 – 2 September 2014), also known as "Clear Sky Cao" (曹青天) and "Contemporary Bao Zheng" (当代包拯), was a politician of the People's Republic of China. He served as chairman of Jiangsu Provincial Committee of the Chinese People's Political Consultative Conference between February 1998 to March 2003, secretary of Jiangsu Provincial Committee of the Central Commission for Discipline Inspection of the Chinese Communist Party, from July 1987 to September 2001, and deputy secretary of the Jiangsu Provincial Committee of the CPC between February 1991 to September 2001.

He was a delegate to the 13th, 14th and 15th CPC National Congresses and a member of the 9th CPPCC National Committee.

== Life ==
Cao was born and raised in Nanyang, Henan, during the Republic of China.

He got involved in politics in November 1951 and joined the Chinese Communist Party (CCP) in July 1959.

Cao worked as a manager at the Nanjing No. 307 Plant for over 20 years. Beginning in 1953, he served in several posts in Nanjing, capital of Jiangsu province, including group leader, section chief, factory director, and CPC Party Chief.

In July 1987, Cao was promoted to become secretary of Jiangsu Provincial Committee of the Central Commission for Discipline Inspection, a position he held until September 2001. He also served as Deputy Secretary of the Jiangsu Provincial Committee of the CPC between February 1991 to September 2001. In 1996, he investigated and prosecuted the illegal fund-raising case of Wuxi Emerging Industrial Company (Chinese: 无锡新兴实业总公司), and he was awarded "First-Class Merit". In 2002, the corruption case of Ma Xiangdong (simplified Chinese: 马向东; traditional Chinese: 馬向東; Vice-Mayor of Shenyang) was heard by him.

From February 1998 to March 2003, Cao served as chairman of Jiangsu Provincial Committee of the Chinese People's Political Consultative Conference.

In March 2003, he was transferred to Beijing as director of the Chinese Society and Law Committee of CPPCC, he served until March 2008.

On 2 September 2014, Cao died in Nanjing, Jiangsu.

Government offices
Preceded by Sun Han	Chairman of Jiangsu Provincial Committee of the Chinese People's Political Consultative Conference; 1998–2003	Succeeded by Xu Zhonglin
