= Han Liming =

Chinese politician

- 韩立明

Party Secretary of Nanjing
- In office June 2021 – December 2024
- Deputy: Xia Xinmin (mayor)
- Preceded by: Zhang Jinghua
- Succeeded by: Zhou Hongbo

Mayor of Nanjing
- In office October 2019 – June 2021
- Party Secretary: Zhang Jinghua
- Preceded by: Lan Shaomin
- Succeeded by: Xia Xinmin

Personal details
- Born: September 1964 (age 62) Changzhou, Jiangsu, China
- Party: Chinese Communist Party
- Education: Zhenjiang Normal School; Zhenjiang Shipbuilding College; Southeast University; Party School of the Jiangsu Provincial Committee of the Chinese Communist Party

Chinese name
- Simplified Chinese: 韩立明
- Traditional Chinese: 韓立明
Transcriptions
Standard Mandarin
- Hanyu Pinyin: Hán Lìmíng

Han Liming (Chinese: 韩立明; born September 1964) is a Chinese politician who has been the Party Secretary of Nanjing, the top political position in the city, since June 2021.

She was a delegate to the 11th National People's Congress and is a delegate to the 13th National People's Congress.

== Early life and education ==
Han was born in Changzhou, Jiangsu, in September 1964. She graduated from Zhenjiang Normal School as well as Zhenjiang Shipbuilding College. She began graduate work at Southeast University in 1997 and the Party School of the Jiangsu Provincial Committee of the Chinese Communist Party in 2001.

== Career ==
Han entered the workforce in August 1984, and joined the Chinese Communist Party (CCP) in April 1986. She was promoted to be Chinese Communist Party Deputy Committee Secretary of Zhonglou District in April 2002, and soon assigned to the similar position in Wujin District in December of that same year. She concurrently held the vice governor position there. She became CCP Deputy Committee Secretary and mayor of Liyang, a county-level city under the jurisdiction of Changzhou, in December 2005, and then CCP Committee Secretary, the top political position in the city, and also chairperson of Liyang Municipal People's Congress, beginning in January 2009.

She was appointed head of the Organization Department of CCP Nantong Municipal Committee in May 2011, concurrently serving as a member of the standing committee of the CCP Nantong Municipal Committee, the city's top authority. She served as executive vice mayor of Nantong in June 2012, and promoted to the mayor position in January 2016.

She was promoted to be communist party secretary of Taizhou, a neighboring city of Nantong, in April 2018, concurrently holding the chairperson of Taizhou Municipal People's Congress position since January 2019.

In September 2019, she was transferred to Nanjing, capital of Jiangsu province, and appointed deputy communist party secretary and director of Management Committee of Jiangbei New Area. She served as mayor from October 2019 to April 2021, and CCP Committee Secretary, the top political position in the city, beginning in June 2021. In April 2021, she was promoted to member of the standing committee of the Jiangsu Provincial Committee of the CCP, the province's top authority.

Government offices
Preceded by Zhang Guohua	Mayor of Nantong; 2016–2018	Succeeded by Xu Huimin
Preceded by Lan Shaomin	Mayor of Nanjing; 2019–2021	Succeeded by Xia Xinmin
Party political offices
Preceded by Qu Futian	Party Secretary of Taizhou; 2018–2019	Succeeded by Shi Lijun
Preceded by Zhang Jinghua	Party Secretary of Nanjing; 2021–2024	Succeeded by Zhou Hongbo
