= Shuanggui =

Internal disciplinary process

- Simplified Chinese: 双规
- Traditional Chinese: 雙規
- Literal meaning: Double designated
Transcriptions
Standard Mandarin
- Hanyu Pinyin: Shuāngguī

Shuanggui was an internal disciplinary process conducted by the Central Commission for Discipline Inspection of the Chinese Communist Party (CCP) – and its lower-level affiliates – on CCP members who are suspected of "violations of discipline," a charge which usually refers to corruption but can occasionally carry other connotations as well. The Shuanggui process was conducted in secret, in a system which is separate from ordinary Chinese law enforcement. Generally, subjects were isolated from any form of legal counsel or even family visits during the process. Some journalists maintain that the practice had been involved in extraordinary renditions. It was an extrajudicial process outside of the control of the Chinese state.

By the point the CCP member is informed of their Shuanggui, the party disciplinary agencies had often already found enough evidence behind the scenes to establish guilt. As such, being taken to Shuanggui is usually taken as an indictment with presumed guilt despite party regulations which stipulate a presumption of innocence. Party investigators often turn the suspect over to the formal system of prosecution, that is, the procuratorate, if the member is deemed to be guilty, which is most times the case. The system has been described variously as an effective way to root out corruption but also as depriving its subjects of basic legal rights. There have been reports of Shuanggui subjects being tortured to extract forced confessions. In 2018, the shuanggui process was superseded by liuzhi or "retention in custody," which expands beyond CCP members to the entire public sector, academics, and business leaders.

== Legal basis ==
The legal foundation of the shuanggui system is a matter of some controversy and dispute. Both the Chinese Communist Party discipline inspection organs cases inspection regulations Article 28 (3) and the Administrative Supervision Law of the People's Republic of China Article 20 (3) provided that "Order personnel under investigation for suspicion of violating administrative disciplines to make explanations of the matters under investigation at an appointed time and place; however, personnel under investigation shall not be detained in any manner".

== Procedures ==
The process of shuanggui has been shrouded in secrecy for many decades. In recent years much more light has been shed on the internal workings of the shuanggui system, both by Chinese media and by foreign press.

When Party members were removed from their places of work for shuanggui, they were typically held in isolation. They had no access to legal counsel, and were usually not allowed to have contact with their families. Every year, several thousand Party members were believed to be secretly detained for weeks and months under the system. Party officials said that nearly 90 percent of "major corruption cases" are cracked through the use of shuanggui.

In 2013 anti-corruption officials investigated 173,000 cases of corruption using shuanggui. Three people died during these interrogations. In one case, six Party interrogators, who tortured state engineer Yu Qiyi to death, were sentenced to prison.

In early 2014 Zhou Wangyan provided a detailed description of his time under shuanggui. He told the Associated Press that he had been severely tortured during interrogation, in an effort to have him confess to a charge of bribery which he says he did not commit. CCP interrogators forced his legs apart until his left thigh bone snapped with a loud "ka-cha" noise. Zhou said that he was deprived of sleep and food, nearly drowned, whipped with wires, and forced to consume feces. Other party officials told the Associated Press that they were "turned into human punching bags, strung up by the wrists from high windows, or dragged along the floor, face down, by their feet."

The actions taken against those in the custody of the Shuanggui system are designed to extract confessions. There is no external oversight of shuanggui facilities, allowing the Party to "abuse its own members in its own secret jails with impunity". Police officials who receive complaints of torturous and abusive shuanggui procedures are not allowed to investigate them.

== Notable cases ==
A list of notable officials or CCP cadres who have been subjected to shuanggui based on accusations of corruption or violations of CCP discipline:

- Bo Xilai
- Chen Xitong
- Chen Liangyu
- Cheng Kejie
- Ji Jianye
- Yu Qiyi
- Ling Jihua
- Mao Xiaoping
- Meng Hongwei
