= Ren Zhenhe =

Chinese politician (born 1964)

- 任振鹤

Governor of Gansu
- In office 3 December 2020 – 2 September 2026
- Preceded by: Tang Renjian
- Succeeded by: Kong Shaoxun

Personal details
- Born: February 1964 (age 62) Hefeng County, Hubei
- Party: Chinese Communist Party
- Education: Huazhong Institute of Technology

Ren Zhenhe (Chinese: 任振鹤, born February 1964) is a Chinese politician of Tujia ethnicity, served as the Governor of Gansu from 2020 to 2026.

== Biography ==
Ren Zhenhe was born in Hefeng County, Hubei. In 1984, he joined the Chinese Communist Party. He graduated from Huazhong Institute of Technology (present-day Huazhong University of Science and Technology) with a bachelor's degree in 1988, majoring in technical economics. He had been served as the Vice Magistrate of Hefeng County (1993–1996), Deputy Party Secretary of Hefeng County (1996), Deputy Party Secretary of Lichuan (1996–1997), Mayor of Lichuan (1997–1998, acting: 1996–1997), Party Secretary of Lichuan (1998–2002), Deputy Governor of Enshi Tujia and Miao Autonomous Prefecture (2001–2003), Deputy Party Secretary of Enshi (2003–2006), Deputy Party Secretary of Huanggang (2006–2008), Deputy Party Secretary and Mayor of Xianning (2008–2012), Party Secretary of Xianning (2012–2015), Deputy Governor of Hubei Province (2015–2016), Party Secretary of Xiangyang (2016–2017), Head of the Organization Department of Zhejiang Province (2017–2018), head of the Supervision Commission of Zhejiang (2019, acting: 2018–2019), head of the Zhejiang Commission for Discipline Inspection (2018–2019), and Deputy Party Secretary of Jiangsu Province (2019– November 2020).

In November 2020, Ren was appointed as the Deputy Party Secretary of Gansu Province. In December, Ren was named the acting Governor of Gansu. He was elected as the Governor in January 2021 until September 2026. On 6 November 2026, he was appointed as the vice chairman of the National People's Congress Agriculture and Rural Affairs Committee at the 25th meeting of the Standing Committee of the 14th National People's Congress.

Ren is a delegate to the 13th National People's Congress.
