= Nanjing Municipal Committee of the Chinese Communist Party =

Nanjing Municipal Committee of the Chinese Communist Party 中国共产党南京市委员会

Overview
- Type: Highest decision-making organ when Nanjing Municipal Congress is not in session.
- Elected by: Nanjing Municipal Congress
- Length of term: Five years
- Term limits: None
- First convocation: May 1949
- Secretary: Zhou Hongbo
- Executive organ: Standing Committee
- Inspection organ: Commission for Discipline Inspection

The Nanjing Municipal Committee of the Chinese Communist Party is the local branch of the Chinese Communist Party (CCP) in Nanjing, Jiangsu Province. It is elected by the Nanjing Congress of the CCP. The Constitution of the Chinese Communist Party stipulates that the Nanjing Municipal Committee executes the directives of the CCP Central Committee and the Jiangsu Provincial Committee of the Chinese Communist Party, as well as the resolutions of the Municipal Party Congress during its recess, oversees the administration of Nanjing, and provides regular reports on its activities to the Central Committee and the Jiangsu Provincial Committee.

== History ==
In autumn 1922, the Pukou group was founded in Puzhen. In October and November 1923, the CCP Shanghai local and district executive committee resolved to categorize party members in Nanjing and Pukou into the sixth and seventh groups, which subsequently united in December to become the CCP Nanjing local executive committee. In early 1925, the CCP Nanjing local executive committee was dissolved, and the CCP Pukou branch and CCP Nanjing branch were established. In September 1925, the Pukou branch of the CCP was established, which was subsequently renamed the Nanjing branch in December. On April 10, 1927, it was disrupted by the Kuomintang but was reinstated in mid-April, only to be disrupted again in July and restored in September. In October 1927, it evolved into the Nanjing Committee of the CCP. In July 1928, it faced disruption once more, with restoration occurring in September, followed by another disruption the following year and restoration in June. In April 1930, it was again disrupted, restored in May, and subsequently merged with the Communist Youth League and trade union organizations. In 1930, it was obliterated in April, restored in May, and amalgamated with the Communist Youth League and the labor union to establish the Nanjing Red May Action Committee; It was disbanded in early June and reconstituted on July 15 as the Nanjing Action Committee, which was subsequently destroyed by a whirlwind and restored in September. By the end of 1931, the CCP formed the Nanjing Special Committee, which was annihilated in April of the following year, leading to the establishment of the Nanjing Special Branch in November. This was later renamed the CCP Nanjing Committee at the beginning of 1934, but it was not revived after the eighth destruction by the Kuomintang in August.

Prior to the Japanese army's takeover of Nanjing in December, the CCP Nanjing Municipal Committee underwent a reshuffling in September 1937. The CCP founded a branch in Nanjing in 1940, reconstituted it as the CCP Nanjing Working Committee in early 1942, and dissolved it again in 1944. The CCP formed the Nanjing Group in August 1942 and renamed it as the CCP Nanjing Working Committee in June 1944. In April 1945, the Central China Branch of the CCP formed the Nanjing Working Department under the Chenggong Department. In April 1946, it was renamed the Nanjing Municipal Committee.

A new Nanjing Municipal Committee was constituted in May 1949. The rebels temporarily usurped authority in January 1967, leading to the establishment of the Nanjing Revolutionary Committee in March 1968. The Nanjing Municipal Committee of the CCP reinstated in 1971.

== Leadership ==
After the Yangtze River Crossing campaign by the CCP on April 23, 1949, a total of 25 individuals have consecutively occupied the position of Secretary of the CCP Nanjing Municipal Committee.
