= Ji Jianye =

Chinese politician

- 季建业

Mayor of Nanjing
- In office 19 August 2009 – 16 October 2013
- Preceded by: Jiang Hongkun
- Succeeded by: Miao Ruilin

Personal details
- Born: January 28, 1957 (age 69) Shazhou County, Jiangsu, China
- Party: Chinese Communist Party (1974–2014, expelled)

Ji Jianye (Chinese: 季建业; pinyin: Jì Jiànyè; born January 28, 1957) is a former Chinese politician. He was mayor of Nanjing, capital of Jiangsu Province, from 2010 to 2013. Prior to that Ji held office as mayor, then Chinese Communist Party Committee Secretary of the city of Yangzhou between 2003 and 2010. In October 2013, Ji Jianye was abruptly dismissed from office, and detained for investigation by the Central Commission for Discipline Inspection of the Chinese Communist Party (CCP). In January 2014, Ji was expelled from CCP. He was tried on charges of bribery and sentenced to 15 years in prison.

== Career ==
Ji was born in Shazhou County (present-day Zhangjiagang), Jiangsu province, in January 1957. In September 1974, he joined the Chinese Communist Party (CCP). He worked first as an ordinary editor and propaganda functionary in the local party organization in Suzhou. He then became deputy editor for Suzhou Daily, and a government official in Wu County. He later took on a series of increasingly senior leadership roles in the county-level city of Kunshan. He also headed the administration of the Suzhou Lake Tai tourist area.

In July 2001, he was elevated to the post of Deputy Secretary and acting mayor of Yangzhou, and was confirmed as the city's mayor a year later. In 2004 he was named CCP Committee Secretary of Yangzhou. Yangzhou is the hometown of former CCP General Secretary Jiang Zemin.

In 2010, Ji was promoted to mayor of Nanjing, a city with some eight million residents in its areas of jurisdiction. He worked under CCP Committee Secretary Yang Weize, with whom he was known to have a difficult relationship. As mayor of the provincial capital, Ji undertook a large number of massive development projects. In the process, many areas of the city were demolished to make way for new construction. Ji was said to have liked "doing big things", and would put extreme pressure on his subordinates to execute his plans. He once remarked that while Nanjing's construction boom could not be compared to pre-Olympics Beijing, the number of ongoing projects was "comparable to what was going on in Shanghai prior to Expo 2010."

In September 2013, Ji engaged in several rounds of self-criticism at the Nanjing party organization's "democratic life meetings." At these meetings, he was reputedly rebuffed numerous times by CCP Committee Secretary Yang Weize. Yang also criticized Ji for his leadership over a rainwater drainage system. On 16 October 2013, Ji Jianye was dismissed, detained, and investigated under Shuanggui procedures by the CCP Central Commission for Discipline Inspection due to corruption.

=== Investigation and trial ===
The party investigation concluded in January 2014 that Ji "abused his power for the illicit gain of others; took bribes personally or through his family," and was of "depraved morality." Ji was summarily expelled from CCP and his case moved to criminal prosecution. According to the 21st Century Economic Herald, Ji was cooperative with CCP investigators, and even wrote a confession document that was widely circulated among the party rank-and-file in Jiangsu as "educational material". In it Ji was said to have written that he was envious of the luxurious lifestyle of entrepreneurs after China's economic boom, writing, "they live in mansions, ride in nice cars, fly in private jets... they have accumulated wealth and luxury that they can never use up. I was envious."

In December 2014, Ji was indicted on charges of bribery and abuse of power. Ji's trial was held in January 2015 at the Intermediate People's Court in Yantai, Shandong province. The prosecution accused Ji of taking bribes worth some 11.32 million yuan (~$1.19 million) during his term as mayor and CCP Committee Secretary of Yangzhou and as Mayor of Nanjing. Ji pleaded guilty to the charges. While Ji's legal defense team did not dispute the bribery charge, they raised some objections to the specific amount Ji took in bribes. They also argued that Ji's overall cooperation in the investigation should lessen the severity of his sentence. Various Chinese media outlets also reported that Ji purchased land in a cemetery and a mansion in Suzhou for "below market value."

In a dramatic turn of events, Nanjing CCP Committee Secretary Yang Weize was himself detained for investigation in early 2015. In 2014, Ji's father-in-law and former provincial official Gao Dezheng was said to have reported Yang to the authorities accusing him of corruption. Chinese media have suggested that Yang may have played a role in presenting incriminating evidence against Ji to the authorities prior to the latter's investigation, and that Gao in turn may have been attempting to seek revenge for Ji by presenting evidence of corruption against Yang.

On April 7, 2015, Ji Jianye was found guilty of bribery and sentenced to 15 years in prison.

Government offices
Preceded by Jiang Hongkun	Mayor of Nanjing; 2009–2013	Succeeded by Miao Ruilin
