= Miao Ruilin =

Chinese politician

- 缪瑞林

Vice-Governor of Jiangsu
- In office January 2018 – 15 November 2018
- Governor: Wu Zhenglong

Mayor of Nanjing
- In office 16 October 2013 – 19 January 2018
- Preceded by: Ji Jianye
- Succeeded by: Lan Shaomin

Communist Party Secretary of Suqian
- In office April 2011 – January 2013
- Preceded by: Zhang Xinshi
- Succeeded by: Lan Shaomin

Mayor of Suqian
- In office April 2006 – May 2011
- Preceded by: Zhang Xinshi
- Succeeded by: Lan Shaomin

Personal details
- Born: November 1964 (age 61) Rudong County, Jiangsu, China
- Party: Chinese Communist Party (1984–2019; expelled)
- Education: Yangzhou University; Nanjing Agricultural University

Chinese name
- Traditional Chinese: 繆瑞林
- Simplified Chinese: 缪瑞林
Transcriptions
Standard Mandarin
- Hanyu Pinyin: Miào Rùilín

Miao Ruilin (Chinese: 缪瑞林; pinyin: Miào Rùilín; born November 1964) is a former Chinese politician, best known for his term as Mayor of Nanjing. In November 2018 he was placed under investigation by the Chinese Communist Party's anti-corruption agency. At the time he was serving as vice governor of Jiangsu.

He was a deputy to the 18th National Congress of the Chinese Communist Party and a delegate the 11th and 12th National People's Congress.

== Early life and education ==
Miao was born in Rudong County, Jiangsu. He graduated from the Jiangsu Agricultural College, where he obtained a bachelor's degree in agriculture followed by a doctorate in land management.

== Career ==
He has served in various government roles, including chief of the Jiangsu Agricultural Resources Development Bureau, the deputy Communist Party Secretary, Mayor, and Party Secretary of the city of Suqian. In January 2013, Miao was elected Vice-Governor of the Jiangsu province. In December 2013, in the aftermath of the Shuanggui of then Nanjing mayor Ji Jianye, Miao was named Acting Mayor, then confirmed as Mayor of Nanjing in January 2014 til January 2018. The mayoralty in Nanjing is a sub-provincial-level position. In 2016, he was appointed director of Nanjing Jiangbei New area, one of 20 national-level new areas in China. In January 2018, he was elected Vice-Governor of the Jiangsu province again.

== Downfall ==
On November 15, 2018, Miao has been placed under investigation for serious violations of laws and regulations by the Central Commission for Discipline Inspection (CCDI), the party's internal disciplinary body, and the National Supervisory Commission, the highest anti-corruption agency of China.

In January 2019, his qualification for delegates to the 13th Jiangsu People's Congress was terminated. He was expelled from the Party and dismissed from office on April 28, 2019. Prosecutors signed an arrest order for him on May 13. On August 7, he stood trial at the Intermediate People's Court of Qingdao on charges of taking bribes. Prosecutors accused him of taking advantage of his former positions in Jiangsu between 2005 and 2016 to seek profits for relevant organizations and individuals in project approval, project contracting and job adjustment. In return, he directly or through his wife received money and gifts worth over 7.2 million yuan ($99,700). On November 19, Miao was sentenced to 10 years and 6 months in prison for taking bribes of 7.2 million yuan ($99,700) by Qingdao Intermediate People's Court. He was also fined 700,000 yuan ($99,700).

Government offices
Preceded by Zhang Xinshi (张新实)	Mayor of Suqian; 2006-2011	Succeeded by Lan Shaomin
Preceded by Ji Jianye	Mayor of Nanjing; 2013–2018	Succeeded by Lan Shaomin
Party political offices
Preceded by Zhang Xinshi (张新实)	Communist Party Secretary of Suqian; 2011-2013	Succeeded by Lan Shaomin
