= Jiangsu Provincial People's Congress =

Jiangsu Provincial People's Congress 江苏省人民代表大会
- 14th Jiangsu Provincial People's Congress

Type
- Type: Province-level people's congress

History
- Founded: September 27, 1954

Leadership
- Chairman of the Standing Committee: Xin Changxing, CCP since January 2023

Elections
- Jiangsu Provincial People's Congress voting system: Plurality-at-large voting & Two-round system

Jiangsu Provincial People's Congress
- Simplified Chinese: 江苏省人民代表大会
- Traditional Chinese: 江蘇省人民代表大會
Transcriptions
Standard Mandarin
- Hanyu Pinyin: Jiāngsū Shěng Rénmín Dàibiǎo Dàhuì

The Jiangsu Provincial People's Congress is the people's congress of Jiangsu, a province of China. The Congress is elected for a term of five years. The Jiangsu Provincial People's Congress meetings are held at least once a year. After a proposal by more than one-fifth of the deputies, a meeting of the people's congress at the corresponding level may be convened temporarily.

== History ==
The Standing Committee of the Jiangsu Provincial People's Congress was launched in December 1979.

== Organization ==
=== Chairpersons of the Standing Committee ===
Name	Took office	Left office	Ref.
Xu Jiatun	December 1979	April 1983	
Chu Jiang (Chinese: 储江)	April 1983	January 1988	
Han Peixin	January 1988	January 1993	
Shen Daren	January 1993	January 1998	
Chen Huanyou	January 1998	January 2003	
Li Yuanchao	January 2003	January 2008	
Liang Baohua	January 2008	February 2011	
Luo Zhijun	February 2011	February 2017	
Li Qiang	February 2017	January 2018	
Lou Qinjian	January 2018	January 2022	
Wu Zhenglong	January 2022	January 2023	
Xin Changxing	January 2023	Incumbent	

== See also ==
- System of people's congress
- Jiangsu delegation to the National People's Congress
