= List of dignitaries at the memorial service of Nelson Mandela =

This is a list of dignitaries at the state memorial service of Nelson Mandela, the former president of South Africa. Mandela died on 5 December 2013. Many heads of state and government attended the state memorial service on Tuesday, 10 December 2013, at the FNB Stadium in Johannesburg. The memorial service was one of the largest gatherings of world leaders. It was also the largest funeral in the history of South Africa, and the African continent itself.

Two UN secretaries-general, the presidents of the European Council and European Commission, two French presidents, four United States presidents, and four UK prime ministers attended the funeral service. In total, more than 500 VIP dignitaries from 19 supranational organizations and approximately 190 countries had arrived for this event. Some of the dignitaries later attended the burial ceremony on 15 December 2013 at Mandela's hometown, Qunu.

This memorial event was one of the largest in the world in terms of foreign leaders, along with the funeral of Pope John Paul II in 2005 and the state funeral of Queen Elizabeth II on 19 September 2022.

== Dignitaries ==
=== Heads of state and government ===
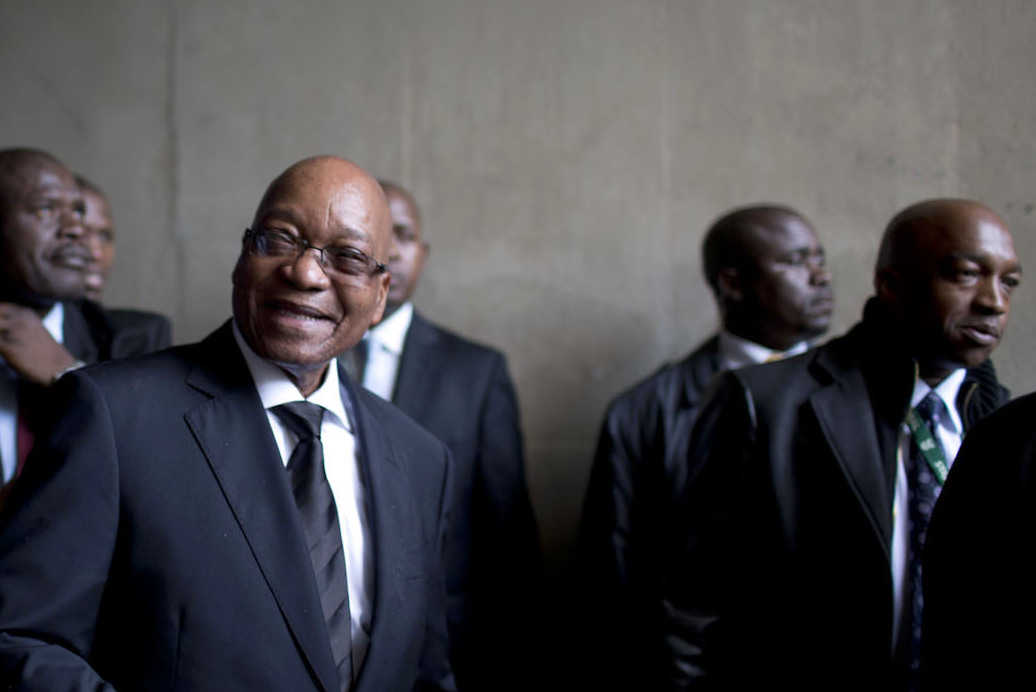
South African President Jacob Zuma waiting to take the stage at the FNB Stadium

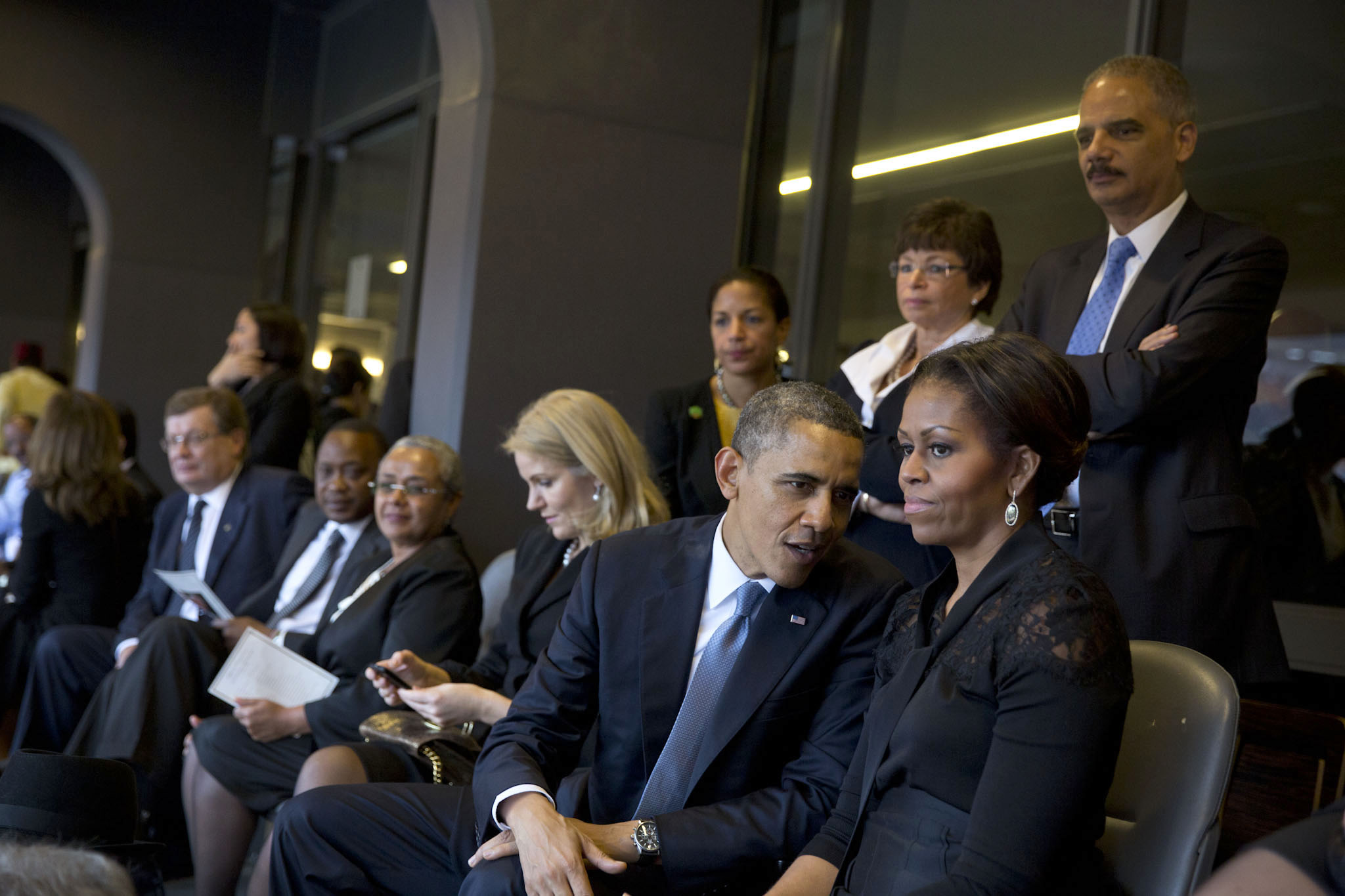
Barack and Michelle Obama seated next to Prime Minister of Denmark Helle Thorning-Schmidt

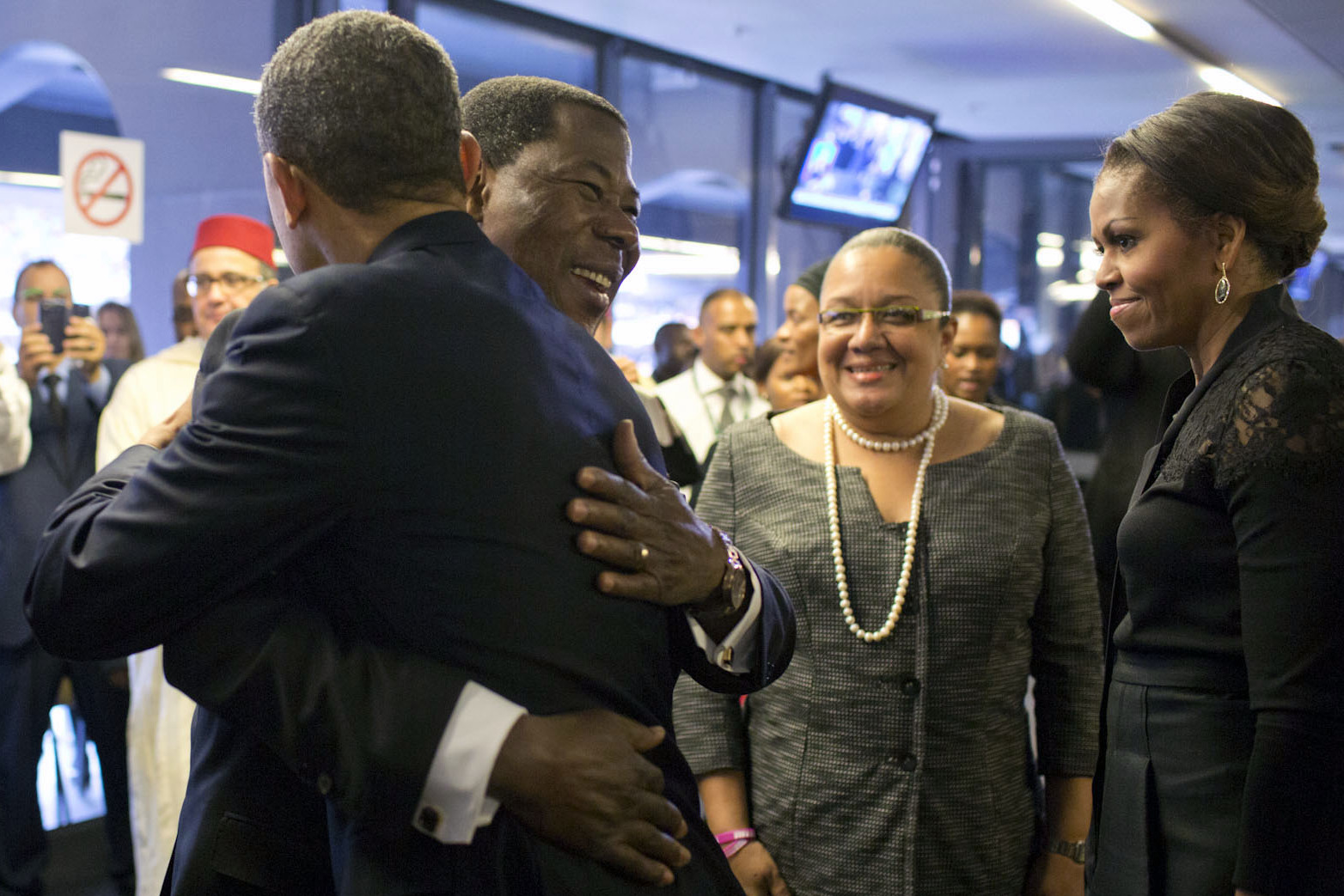
President Yayi Boni of Benin greeting other dignitaries

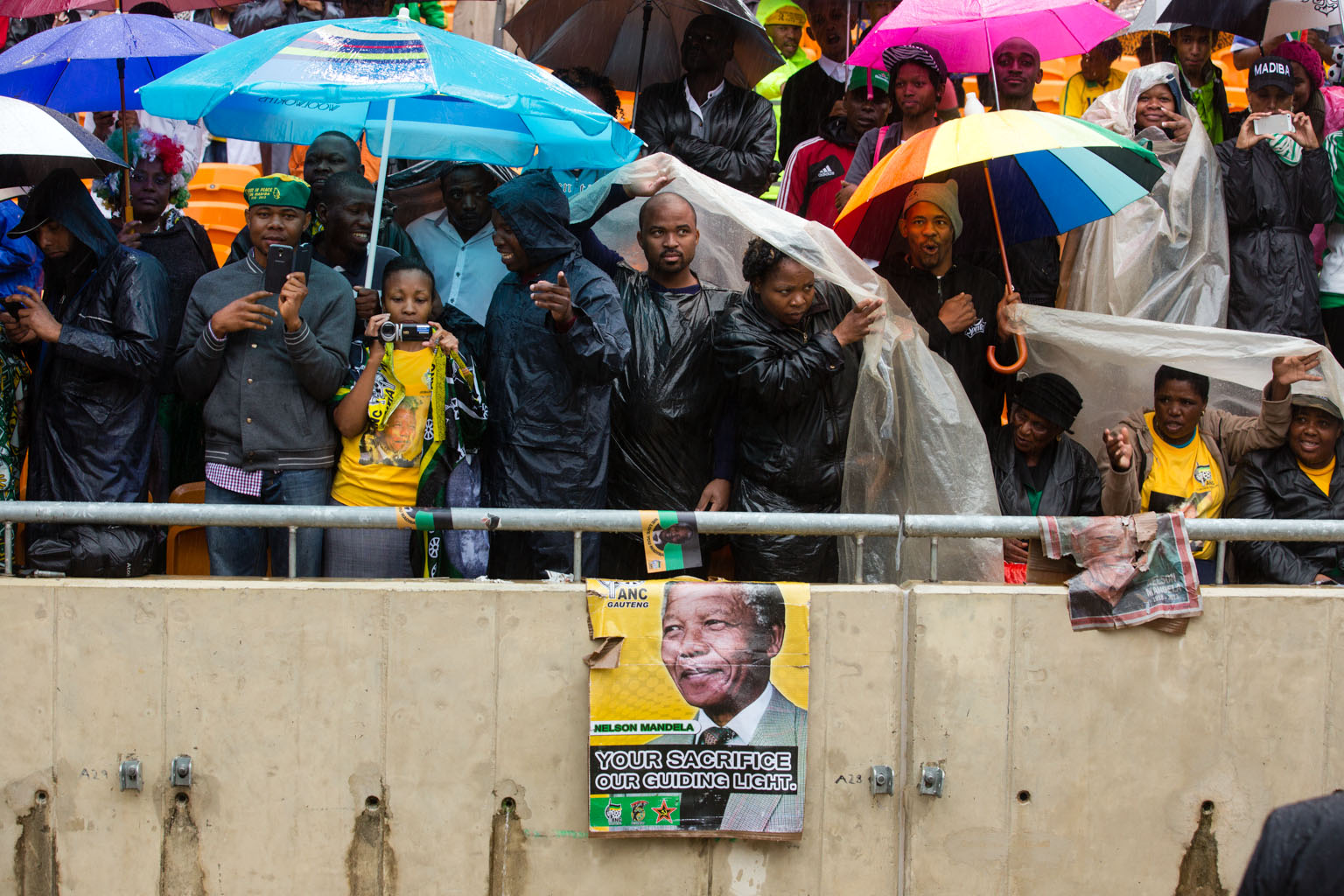
Crowd at the stadium

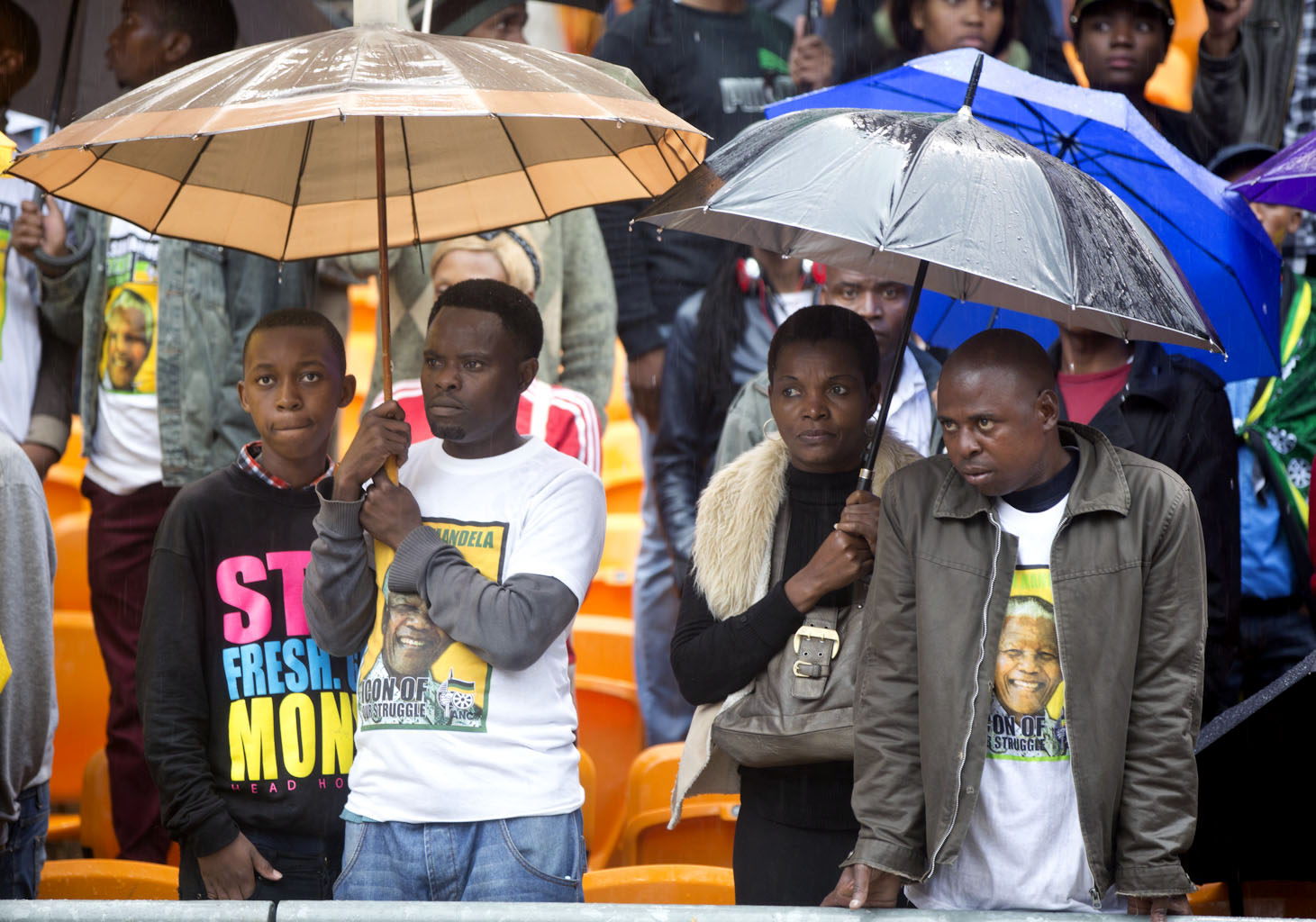
Crowd at the stadium

Country	Title	Dignitary
South Africa	President	Jacob Zuma
Afghanistan	President	Hamid Karzai
Albania	Prime Minister	Sali Berisha
Andorra	Prime Minister	Antoni Marti
Antigua and Barbuda	Prime Minister	Baldwin Spencer
Australia	Prime Minister	Tony Abbott
Austria	Chancellor	Werner Faymann
Bahamas	Prime Minister	Perry Christie
Bangladesh	President	Abdul Hamid
Belgium	King	Philippe
Belgium	Prime Minister	Elio Di Rupo
Belize	Prime Minister	Dean Barrow
Benin	President	Yayi Boni
Botswana	President	Ian Khama
Brazil	President	Dilma Rousseff
Burundi	President	Pierre Nkurunziza
Canada	Prime Minister	Stephen Harper
Chad	President	Idriss Déby
Chile	President	Sebastián Piñera
Comoros	President	Ikililou Dhoinine
Democratic Republic of Congo	President	Joseph Kabila
Republic of the Congo	President	Denis Sassou Nguesso
Croatia	President	Ivo Josipović
Cuba	President	Raúl Castro
Denmark	Prime Minister	Helle Thorning-Schmidt
Djibouti	President	Ismaïl Omar Guelleh
Dominica	President	Eliud Williams
Dominican Republic	President	Danilo Medina
East Timor	Prime Minister	Xanana Gusmão
Equatorial Guinea	President	Teodoro Obiang Nguema Mbasogo
Ethiopia	Prime Minister	Hailemariam Desalegn
Finland	President	Sauli Niinistö
France/Andorra	President/Co-Prince	François Hollande
Gabon	President	Ali Bongo Ondimba
The Gambia	President	Yahya Jammeh
Germany	President	Joachim Gauck
Ghana	President	John Dramani Mahama
Greece	Prime Minister	Antonis Samaras
Grenada	Prime Minister	Keith Mitchell
Guinea	President	Alpha Condé
Guyana	President	Donald Ramotar
Haiti	President	Michel Martelly
Haiti	Prime Minister	Laurent Lamothe
Holy See	Prime Minister	Angelo Sodano
Hungary	Prime Minister	Viktor Orbán
Iceland	President	Ólafur Ragnar Grímsson
India	President	Pranab Mukherjee
Iraq	President	Jalal Talabani
Ireland	President	Michael D. Higgins
Italy	Prime Minister	Enrico Letta
Ivory Coast	President	Alassane Ouattara
Jamaica	Prime Minister	Portia Simpson-Miller
Jordan	Prime Minister	Abdullah Ensour
Kenya	President	Uhuru Kenyatta
Latvia	President	Andris Bērziņš
Lebanon	Prime Minister	Najib Mikati
Lesotho	Prime Minister	Tom Thabane
Lesotho	King	King Letsie III
Liberia	President	Ellen Johnson Sirleaf
Liechtenstein	Prime Minister	Adrian Hasler
Luxembourg	Grand Duke	Henri
Madagascar	President	Andry Rajoelina
Malawi	President	Joyce Banda
Mali	President	Ibrahim Boubacar Keita
Malta	Prime Minister	Joseph Muscat
Mauritania	President	Mohamed Ould Abdel Aziz
Mauritius	Prime Minister	Navin Ramgoolam
Mexico	President	Enrique Peña Nieto
Monaco	Sovereign Prince	Albert II
Montenegro	President	Filip Vujanovic
Mozambique	President	Armando Guebuza
Namibia	President	Hifikepunye Pohamba
Netherlands	King	Willem-Alexander
Netherlands	Prime Minister	Mark Rutte
New Zealand	Prime Minister	John Key
Niger	President	Mahamadou Issoufou
Nigeria	President	Goodluck Jonathan
Norway	Prime Minister	Erna Solberg
Pakistan	President	Mamnoon Hussain
State of Palestine	President	Mahmoud Abbas
Poland	Prime Minister	Donald Tusk
Portugal	President	Aníbal Cavaco Silva
Romania	Prime Minister	Victor Ponta
Rwanda	President	Paul Kagame
Sahrawi Republic	President	Mohammed Abdelaziz
Saint Kitts and Nevis	Prime Minister	Denzil Douglas
Saint Lucia	Prime Minister	Kenny Anthony
Saint Vincent and the Grenadines	Prime Minister	Ralph Gonsalves
Senegal	President	Macky Sall
Serbia	President	Tomislav Nikolić
Seychelles	President	James Michel
Sierra Leone	President	Ernest Bai Koroma
Slovakia	President	Ivan Gasparovic
Slovenia	President	Borut Pahor
Somalia	President	Hassan Sheikh Mohamud
South Korea	Prime Minister	Jung Hong-won
South Sudan	President	Salva Kiir
Spain	Prime Minister	Mariano Rajoy
Sri Lanka	President	Mahinda Rajapaksa
Suriname	President	Dési Bouterse
Swaziland	Prime Minister	Sibusiso Dlamini
Sweden	Prime Minister	Fredrik Reinfeldt
Switzerland	President	Ueli Maurer
Syria	President	Bashar al-Assad
Tanzania	President	Jakaya Kikwete
Togo	President	Faure Gnassingbe
Trinidad and Tobago	Prime Minister	Kamla Persad-Bissessar
Tunisia	President	Moncef Marzouki
Uganda	President	Yoweri Museveni
United Kingdom	Prime Minister	David Cameron
United States	President	Barack Obama
Uruguay	President	José Mujica
Venezuela	President	Nicolás Maduro
Vanuatu	Prime Minister	Ham Lini
Zambia	President	Michael Sata
Zimbabwe	President	Robert Mugabe

=== Other royalty ===
Country	Title	Dignitary
Belgium	Queen	Mathilde
Denmark	Crown Prince	Frederik
Japan	Crown Prince	Naruhito
Jordan	Queen Consort	Rania
(South Africa) Monaco	Princess Consort	Charlene (Note: Charlene was a native citizen of South Africa before her marriage to Prince Albert II.)
Morocco	Prince	Moulay Rachid
Norway	Crown Prince	Haakon
Saudi Arabia	Prince	Muqrin
Spain	Crown Prince	Felipe VI
Sweden	Crown Princess	Victoria
United Kingdom	Prince of Wales	Charles
United Kingdom	Duke of Cambridge	Prince William
United Kingdom	Prince	Harry

=== Government representatives ===
Country	Title	Dignitary
South Africa	Deputy President	Kgalema Motlanthe
Algeria	Speaker of the Council of the Nation	Abdelkader Bensalah
Angola	Vice-president	Manuel Vicente
Antigua and Barbuda	High Commissioner	Carl Ruberts
Antigua and Barbuda	Ambassador	Robert Murdoch
Argentina	Acting President	Amado Boudou
Bahamas	Minister of Foreign Affairs	Fred Mitchell
Bahamas	Minister of Tourism	Obie Wilchcombe
Barbados	Foreign Minister	Maxine McClean
Belarus	Vice Chairman of the House of Representatives	Viktor Guminsky
British Virgin Islands	Foreign Minister	Orlando Smith
Bulgaria	Deputy Prime Minister	Angel Velichkov
Canada	Nova Scotia Premier	Stephen McNeil
Canada	Premier of the Yukon	Darrell Pasloski
Canada	Alberta Premier	Alison Redford
Canada	NDP Leader	Tom Mulcair
Canada	Foreign Minister	John Baird
Central African Republic	Deputy Prime Minister	Samuel Rangba
China	Vice-president	Li Yuanchao
Colombia	Vice-president	Angelino Garzón
Cuba	Foreign Minister	Bruno Rodriguez
Czech Republic	Minister of Foreign Affairs	Jan Kohout
Ecuador	Foreign Minister	Ricardo Patiño
Egypt	Chairman of the National Council for Human Rights	Mohammed Faiq
El Salvador	Minister of Foreign Affairs	Jaime Miranda
Estonia	Foreign Minister	Urmas Paet
Ethiopia	State Minister	Surafiel Mhreteab Abed
France	Minister of Foreign and European Affairs	Laurent Fabius
France	Minister of Justice	Christiane Taubira
Greece	Minister of National Defence	Dimitris Avramopoulos
Holy See	President of the Pontifical Council for Justice and Peace	Peter Turkson
Hungary	Deputy Prime Minister	Zsolt Semjén
India	Chairperson of the National Advisory Council	Sonia Gandhi
India	Minister of Commerce and Industry	Anand Sharma
India	Leader of Opposition in Lok Sabha	Sushma Swaraj
Iran	Vice President	Mohammad Shariatmadari
Ireland	Tánaiste	Eamon Gilmore
Israel	President of the Knesset	Yuli-Yoel Edelstein
Israel	Knesset representatives	5 Speakers
Italy	President of the Chamber of Deputies	Laura Boldrini
Lesotho	Foreign Minister	Mohlabi Tsekoa
Lithuania	Government Representative	Gitanas Nausėda
Malawi	Foreign Minister	Ephraim Chiume
Malaysia	Minister of the Federal Territories	Tengku Adnan Tengku Mansor
Malaysia	Minister of Energy, Green Technology and Water	Maximus Ongkili
Nepal	Minister of Foreign Affairs	Madhav Prasad Ghimire
Netherlands	Foreign Minister	Frans Timmermans
Nicaragua	Vice-president	Moises Omar Halleslevens Acevedo
Poland	Foreign Minister	Radosław Sikorski
Peru	Vice-president	Marisol Espinoza
Philippines	Vice-president	Jejomar Binay
Russia	Chairwoman of the Federation Council	Valentina Matviyenko
Singapore	Deputy Prime Minister	Tharman Shanmugaratnam
Slovakia	Minister of Foreign Affairs	Miroslav Lajčák
Sudan	Vice President	Bakri Hassan Saleh
Tanzania	Foreign Minister	Bernard Membe
Tanzania	Representative from Chama Cha Mapinduzi	Vicky Swai
Turkey	Deputy Prime Minister	Beşir Atalay
Ukraine	Foreign Minister	Leonid Kozhara
United Arab Emirates	Minister of Culture	Nahyan bin Mubarak Al Nahyan
United Kingdom	Deputy Prime Minister	Nick Clegg
United Kingdom	Leader of the Opposition	Ed Miliband
United Kingdom	Mayor of London	Boris Johnson
United Kingdom	Speaker of the House of Commons	John Bercow
United Kingdom	Health Secretary	Jeremy Hunt
United States	First Lady	Michelle Obama
United States	Attorney General	Eric Holder
United States	National Security Advisor	Susan Rice
United States	Senator from Texas	Ted Cruz
United States	United States Congress representatives	26 members of Congress
United States Virgin Islands	Deputy Minister	Donna Christian Christensen
Uruguay	Minister of Foreign Relations	Luis Almagro
Vietnam	Chairman of the Presidential Office	Đào Việt Trung
Zambia	Vice-president	Guy Scott
Zambia	Foreign Minister	Wilbur Simuusa
Zimbabwe	Deputy Prime Minister	Simbarashe Mumbengegwi

=== International organisations ===
Organisation	Title	Dignitary
Arab League	President	Samir Hosny
African Union	Chairperson of the AU Commission	Nkosazana Dlamini-Zuma
Commonwealth of Nations	Secretary-General	Kamalesh Sharma
Council of Europe	Secretary General	Thorbjorn Jagland
(European Union) European Council	President	Herman Van Rompuy
European Union	President of the European Commission	José Manuel Barroso
European Union	President of Parliament	Martin Schultz
European Union	Head of Delegation	Roeland van der Geer
FAO	President	José Graziano da Silva
ILO	President	Guy Ryder
International Monetary Fund	Managing Director	Christine Lagarde
International Organization for Migration	Director General	William Lacy Swing
NATO	Secretary General	Anders Fogh Rasmussen
OECD	Secretary General	José Ángel Gurría
OSCE	Secretary General	Lamberto Zannier
Southern African Development Community	Secretary General	Stergomena Tax
United Nations	Secretary-General	Ban Ki-moon
United Nations	Human Rights Commissioner	Navi Pillay
UNESCO	Director general	Irina Bokova
United Nations Office on Drugs and Crime	President	Yuri Fedotov
World Food Programme	President	Ertharin Cousin
World Bank	President	Jim Yong Kim

=== Former heads of state / government ===
Country / Org	Title	Dignitary
South Africa	State President / 1st Deputy President	Frederik Willem De Klerk
South Africa	2nd President	Thabo Mbeki
South Africa	3rd President	Kgalema Motlanthe
Australia	Former Prime Minister	Paul Keating
Malaysia	Former Prime Minister	Mahathir Mohamad
Brazil	31st President	José Sarney
Brazil	32nd President	Fernando Collor de Mello
Brazil	34th President	Fernando Henrique Cardoso
Brazil	35th President	Luiz Inácio Lula da Silva
Canada	16th Prime Minister	Joe Clark
Canada	18th Prime Minister	Brian Mulroney
Canada	19th Prime Minister	Kim Campbell
Canada	20th Prime Minister	Jean Chrétien
Canada	26th Governor General	Adrienne Clarkson
Canada	27th Governor General	Michaëlle Jean
Colombia	30th President	Andrés Pastrana
Finland	10th President	Martti Ahtisaari
Finland	40th Prime Minister	Matti Vanhanen
France	23rd President	Nicolas Sarkozy
France	164th Prime Minister	Alain Juppé
France	165th Prime Minister	Lionel Jospin
Germany	13th President	Horst Köhler
Ghana	1st President (Fourth Republic)	Jerry Rawlings
Iran	5th President	Mohammad Khatami
Ireland	7th President	Mary Robinson
Ireland	Former Taoiseach	Bertie Ahern
Italy	Former Prime Minister	Silvio Berlusconi
Japan	58th Prime Minister	Yasuo Fukuda
Namibia	1st President	Sam Nujoma
New Zealand	35th Prime Minister	Jim Bolger
Nigeria	1st President (Fourth Republic)	Olusegun Obasanjo
Nigeria	11th Vice President	Atiku Abubakar
Norway	27th Prime Minister	Jens Stoltenberg
Poland	2nd President	Lech Wałęsa
Romania	3rd President	Emil Constantinescu
Russia	Former Soviet President	Mikhail Gorbachev
United Kingdom	former Prime Minister	John Major
United Kingdom	former Prime Minister	Tony Blair
United Kingdom	former Prime Minister	Gordon Brown
United States	39th President	Jimmy Carter
United States	42nd President	Bill Clinton
United States	43rd President	George W. Bush
Tanzania	Former Vice President	Ali Mohamed Shein
Zambia	1st President	Kenneth Kaunda
African Union	Former President	Alpha Oumar Konare
United Nations	7th Secretary General	Kofi Annan

=== Other guests ===
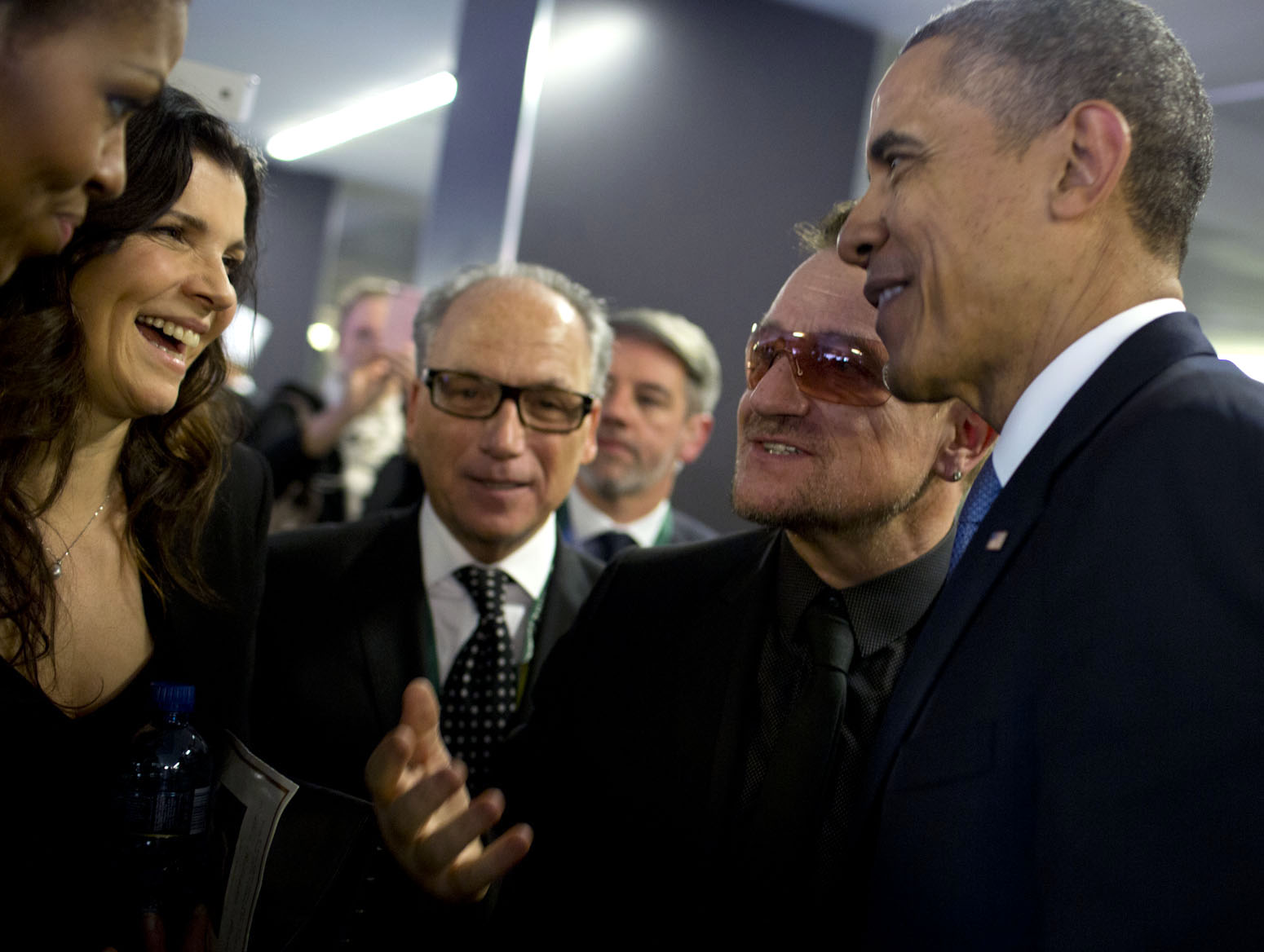
Bono and his wife Ali Hewson greet President Obama at the memorial service

This section is a partial list of notable guests who attended the memorial service.

- Bono, Irish singer (U2) and activist
- Richard Branson, British businessman, founder of Virgin Group
- Laura Bush, former First Lady, spouse of former US President George W. Bush
- Naomi Campbell, British model
- Chelsea Clinton, daughter of former US President Bill Clinton
- Hillary Clinton, former US Secretary of State (Governmental representatives).
- Peter Gabriel, British singer
- Bill Gates, American businessman, founder and president of Microsoft
- Jesse Jackson, American civil rights activist, minister, and politician
- Henry Kissinger, former US Secretary of State (Governmental representatives).
- Annie Lennox, British singer-songwriter
- Francois Pienaar, South African rugby player
- Charlize Theron, South African-American actress
- Desmond Tutu, South African Anglican Archbishop
- Oprah Winfrey, American television personality and actress

== Non-attendance ==
- Czech Republic: Prime Minister Jiří Rusnok, who did not attend, was caught on Czech television saying that he was "dreading" the funeral, swearing and complaining that lunch and dinner engagements would be interrupted by a trip to South Africa. Rusnok later apologized for his remarks, saying it was "not correct to use such terms" in connection to Mandela's death and funeral.
- Egypt: Egypt sent a delegation headed by Mohammed Faiq, head of the National Council for Human Rights, who attended several international human rights conferences and forums along with Mandela. There was speculation that Egypt did not want to embarrass its interim government by sending a higher representative to the memorial, as South Africa had criticized the ouster of former President Mohamed Morsi in July 2013.
- Germany: Chancellor Angela Merkel was criticized in German media for not attending the memorial service, with one journalist saying it showed "a lack of empathy, a lack of humility and a lack of friendliness". Former Chancellor Gerhard Schroeder, who frequently attended funerals of world leaders during his term of office, did not attend. Germany's former leaders did not usually attend world leaders' funerals.
- Iran: Initial reports said President Hassan Rouhani and Foreign Minister Mohammad Javad Zarif might attend the memorial service. Later reports said the two changed their plans to avoid meeting US President Barack Obama. Zarif was also said to have missed the service due to the visit of his Russian counterpart in Tehran.
- Israel: President Shimon Peres said he would not attend the memorial service for medical reasons. Neither Prime Minister Benjamin Netanyahu attended the memorial service, citing financial and security reasons.
- Sudan: A spokesperson for the Sudanese embassy in South Africa confirmed President Omar al-Bashir would not attend the memorial service, in order to avoid complications from his indictment by the International Criminal Court.
- Republic of China (Taiwan): The ROC Ministry of Foreign Affairs decided to not send a delegation because of the time constraint. Instead, Foreign Minister David Lin personally visited the Liaison Office of South Africa to convey condolences over the death of Mandela. In addition, the Representative of the ROC to South Africa visited the Union Buildings in Pretoria to view the remains of Mandela and pay respects on behalf of the ROC government.
- Thailand: Prime Minister Yingluck Shinawatra was expected to attend but declined due to ongoing protests against her government.
- Tibet: The 14th Dalai Lama was expected to attend the service but was denied a visa by the South African government.
- The Vatican: Pope Francis was sent an invitation to attend either the memorial or state funeral. He did not attend either because it was against the tradition that Popes do not usually attend funerals of world leaders.
- Vietnam: President Trương Tấn Sang did not attend the service due to time constraints. The country was represented by Đào Việt Trung, Chairman of the Presidential Office.
