= Li Xueyong =

Chinese politician

- 李学勇
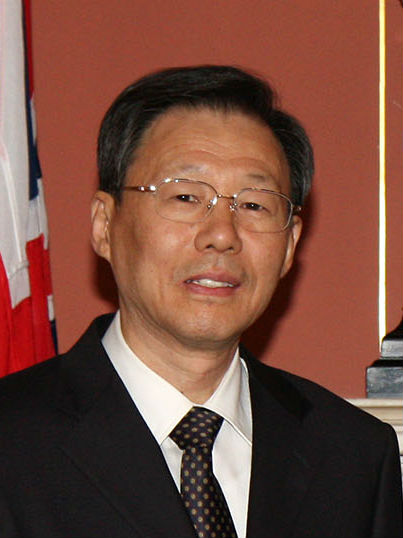

Governor of Jiangsu
- In office 8 December 2010 – 30 November 2015
- Preceded by: Luo Zhijun
- Succeeded by: Shi Taifeng

President of the Nanjing Youth Olympic Games Organizing Committee
- In office 2010–2014
- Leader: Thomas Bach
- Preceded by: Ng Ser Miang

Personal details
- Born: September 1950 (age 76) Shijiazhuang, Hebei, China
- Party: Chinese Communist Party
- Education: Beijing University of Chemical Technology

Li Xueyong (simplified Chinese: 李学勇; traditional Chinese: 李學勇; pinyin: Lǐ Xuéyǒng; born September 1950) is a Chinese politician. He served as Governor of Jiangsu Province from 2010 to 2015. An academic-turned-politician, Li served for many years in the Ministry of Science and Technology.

== Career ==
Li was born in Shijiazhuang, Hebei province. In 1968, he began working for the Heilongjiang Production and Construction Corps as a soldier and labourer. He joined the Chinese Communist Party in March 1974, in the latter stages of the Cultural Revolution. In 1977, he became a factory worker at a pharmaceutical plant in Beijing.

After the Cultural Revolution, he attended Beijing University of Chemical Technology, where he studied polymers. He stayed at his alma mater after graduation to become an instructor. In 1984 he joined the National Science Commission, where he began to climb through the organization's administrative ranks. He worked at the commission until September 1995 when he was transferred to Xi'an to serve as vice mayor. In March 1998 he became Vice Minister of Science and Technology. In April 2007 he was promoted to party branch secretary. Because the ministry at the time was not headed by a member of the Communist Party, Li's position as party branch chief made him a minister-level official.

On December 7, 2010, he was named acting governor of Jiangsu province, confirmed on February 14, 2011. He retired in November 2015 due to mandated retirement rules, which called for the retirement of all provincial-ministerial level officials at age 65; he was succeeded by Shi Taifeng. In 2015, he joined the National People's Congress Financial and Economic Affairs Committee as a deputy chair. In March 2018, he was appointed the director of the National People's Congress Education, Science, Culture and Public Health Committee.

Li was a member of the 17th and 18th Central Committees of the Chinese Communist Party.

Government offices
Previous: Luo Zhijun	Governor of Jiangsu; 2010–2015	Succeeded by Shi Taifeng
Sporting positions
Preceded by (Singapore) Ng Ser Miang	President of Organizing Committee for Summer Youth Olympic Games; 2014	Succeeded by Gerardo Werthein
