= Committee for Agriculture and Rural Affairs =

Special Committee of the CPPCC National Committee

- 中国人民政治协商会议全国委员会农业和农村委员会
- Formation: March 16, 2018; 8 years ago
- Type: Special committee of the CPPCC
- Location: Beijing
- Chairperson: Wang Jianjun
- Parent organization: Chinese People's Political Consultative Conference

Chinese name
- Simplified Chinese: 中国人民政治协商会议全国委员会农业和农村委员会
- Traditional Chinese: 中國人民政治協商會議全國委員會農業和農村委員會
Transcriptions
Standard Mandarin
- Hanyu Pinyin: Zhōngguó Rénmín Zhèngzhì Xiéshāng Huìyì QuánguóWěiyuánhuì Nóngyè Hé Nóngcūn Wěiyuánhuì

Shortest form
- Simplified Chinese: 全国政协农业和农村委员会
- Traditional Chinese: 全國政協農業和農村委員會
Transcriptions
Standard Mandarin
- Hanyu Pinyin: Quánguó Zhèngxié Nóngyè Hé Nóngcūn Wěiyuánhuì

The Committee for Agriculture and Rural Affairs is one of ten special committees of the National Committee of the Chinese People's Political Consultative Conference, China's top political advisory body and a central part of the Chinese Communist Party's united front system.

== History ==
The Agriculture and Rural Affairs Committee was created in March 2018 during the 13th National Committee of the Chinese People's Political Consultative Conference as part of the deepening the reform of the Party and state institutions.

== List of chairpersons ==
No.	Chairpersons	Took office	Left office	Notes
13th	Luo Zhijun	16 March 2018	13 March 2023	
14th	Wang Jianjun	13 March 2023	Incumbent	

== See also ==
- Agriculture and Rural Affairs Committee of the NPC
