= Jiangsu delegation to the National People's Congress =

Jiangsu Delegation to the National People's Congress
- 全国人民代表大会江苏省代表团
- Delegation for the National People's Congress
- Map showing the location of Jiangsu Province
- Electoral unit: Jiangsu Province
- Population: 84,748,016

Current Delegation
- Created: 1954
- Seats: 144
- Head of delegation: Xin Changxing
- Provincial People's Congress: Jiangsu Provincial People's Congress

The Jiangsu delegation to the National People's Congress is a delegation composed of deputies representing Jiangsu Province within the National People's Congress (NPC), the highest organ of state power of the People's Republic of China. NPC deputies from the Jiangsu Province are officially elected by the Jiangsu Provincial People's Congress.

== List of deputies ==
Year	NPC sessions	Deputies	Number of deputies	Ref.
1954	1st	Ding Xilin, Wang Shitai, Wang Kunlun, Wang Shao'ao, Wang Xinzhang, Wang Xuewen, Shi Liang, Wu Yunfu, Zhu Zhaoxue, Leng Yu, Wu Yifang, Li Shihai, Li Mingyang, Li Chenggan, Li Weiguang, Sha Qianli, Zhou Peiyuan, Ji Fang, Qiu Yihan, Shao Zonghan, Jin Shanbao, Hou Debang, Yu Huancheng, Ke Zhongping, Ke Qingshi, Liu Yazi, Hu Wenyao, Hu Naiqiu, Hu Qiaomu, Mao Yisheng, Xu Xiaobing, Xu Zhiyin, Zhang Zhirang, Zhang Yi Bo, Zhang Manyun, Zhang Wentian, Zhang Hanfu, Xu Liqun, Xu Wentian, Chen Yongkang, Chen Kehan, Chen Zhongjing, Lu Dingyi, Lu Yuanlei, Hui Yuyu, Si Xingjian, Hua Junwu, Fei Xiaotong, Huang Yanpei, Yang Junsheng, Ye Shengtao, Da Pusheng, Liao Luyan, Guan Wenwei, Liu Guojun, Liu Daosheng, Pan Zinian, Pan Shu, Zheng Zhenduo, Zheng Pijiang, Qian Zhengying, Qian Junrui, Qian Sunqing, Qian Weichang, Xue Muqiao, Chu Anping, Luo Qiong: By-election on June 15, 1956: Chen Guang, He Bihui; By-election on June 29, 1957: Gong Weizhen	67	
1959	2nd	Ding Xilin, Wang Hengshan, Wang Shao'ao, Kong Yuan, Ye Shengtao, Shi Liang (female), Liu Guojun, Liu Shuxun, Zhuang Minggeng, Da Pusheng, Zhu Zhaoxue, Zhu Muzhi, Hua Junwu, Hua Luogeng, Sha Qianli, Leng Yu, Li Qingkui, Li Mingyang, Li Weiguang, Lu Dingyi, Chen Yongkang, Chen Guang, Chen Zhongjing, Wu Yifang (female), He Bihui (female), Zhang Zhirang, Zhang Manyun (female), Zhang Yibo, Zhang Huilan (female), Zhang Wentian, Luo Ergang, Luo Qiong (female), Jin Shanbao, Ji Fang, Zhou Peiyuan, Ji Yuting, Hu Wenyao, Hu Qiaomu, Hu Naiqiu (female), Ke Zhongping, Mao Yisheng, Yu Huancheng, Hou Debang, Pu Anxiu (female), Gong Weizhen, Qin Xiangbao, Xu Xiaobing, Zhang Yangfen (female), Xu Wentian, Guo Yingqiu, Cao Yiou (female), Zeng Shiying, Peng Chong, Hui Yuyu, Si Xingjian, Huang Yanpei, Cheng Maolan, Yang Junsheng, Liao Shicheng, Guan Wenwei, Pan Zinian, Pan Shu, Qian Zhengying (female), Qian Junrui, Xue Muqiao, Dai Yucai, Dai Baitao	67	
1964	3rd	Ding Xilin, Ding Guangxun, Ma Ke, Ma Junshou, Ma Rongzhi, Ji Yuting, Wang Zhijiang, Wang Yun, Wang Shaotang, Wang Shouwu, Wang Zhiping, Wang Ping, Wang Shao'ao, Wang Hengshan, Wang Ganchang, Wang Huiying, Wang Maosheng, Lu Liangshu, Lu Yanhao, Ye Shengtao, Ye Guoying, Ye Laishi, Shi Liang, Shi Zhongqi, Bao Zhijing, Jiang Jian, Liu Gongcheng, Liu Guojun, Liu Shuxun, Liu Feng, Liu Dunzhen, Liu Zengda, Liu Jingyi, Zhuang Minggeng, Xu Wentian, Kuang Yaming, Da Pusheng, Lü Shuxiang, Zhu Fengmei, Zhu Zhengyuan, Zhu Chunyuan, Zhu Xia, Zhu Muzhi, Zhong Chongxin, Hua Xingnai, Hua Junwu, Sun Benzhong, Shen Peihua, Sha Qianli, Yan Kai, Li Shi Ying, Li Yongxi, Li Qingkui, Li Mingyang, Li Shaozhang, Li Weiguang, Yang Tingbao, Wu Gongliang, Wu Zhihua, Wu Zhengkai, Wu Yifang, Gu Chunfan, He Bihui, He Fuzhen, Zou Yunxiang, Zhang Guangzhong, Zhang Zhirang, Zhang Azhou, Zhang Yibo, Zhang Yuzhe, Zhang Manyun, Zhang Jingli, Lu Renfu, Lu Dingyi, Chen Liping, Chen Yongkang, Chen Bangjie, Chen Zhiding, Chen Zhongjing, Chen Chunshou, Shan Zongsu, Fan Beiqiang, Fan Cunzhong, Fan Xuji, Mao Yisheng, Lin Zun, Lin Rong, Luo Ergang, Luo Qingsheng, Luo Qiong, Jin Shanbao, Jin Jingfen, Zhu Shuizhao, Ji Fang, Zhou Lisan, Zhou Zhaoyu, Zhou Peiyuan, Zhou Zanheng, Zhou Weizhi, Gong WeizhenZhao Fangxiong, Hu Qiaomu, Hu Naiqiu, Hu Cuihua, Liu Dagang, Yu Huancheng, Hou Debang, He Wenjie, Gao Xiuying, Gao Xiaoping, Guo Qinggui, Zhu Huifen, Gu Qinghong, Gu Zhiwei, Gu Fusheng, Xi Yuanling, Qian Xinzong, Xu Yujun, Xu Zhilun, Xu Zhiyin, Xu Xiaobing, Xu Min, Zhang Yangfen, Zhang Ruiying, Zhang Deshen, Mei Jifang, Zeng Shiying, Zeng Zhaoyu, Peng Chong, Si Xia, Huang Lixing, Huang Wenxi, Huang Xinbai, Huang Yanpei, Ge Tingzhi, Dong Jiageng, Hui Yuyu, Cheng Kaijia, Cheng Maolan, Cheng Xuansheng, Fu Baoshi, Liao Shicheng, Guan Wenwei, Pan Shu, Pan Zinian, Yan Shoumin, Xue Muqiao, Dai Yucai, Dai Baitao, Dai Anbang, Dai Guirui, Wei Wenbo, Wei Yuhua, Wei Rongjue	154	
1975	4th	Ding Keze, Ding Guangxun, Yu Sishan, Wang Tianxiang, Wang Yuxiang, Wang Henglan, Wang Jingmei, Wang Fulai, Wang Zengxi, Deng Baosen, Feng Liyun, Lü Zhiguang, Liu Shuiguang, Liu Changhua, Liu Yuzhen, Liu Tonghe, Liu Zhikui, Liu Guojun, Liu Xigeng, Qi Mingfa, Xu Yixin, Xu Dianshi, Xu Jiatun, Sun Mingchen, Su Zhengfa, Li Yu, Li Yuquan, Li Zhizhong, Yang Guangli, Yang Tingbao, Wu Youquan, Wu Kezhi, Wu Zhuangmei, Wu Xingcai, Wu Yifang, Wu Jinhua, He Taide, Zou Yunxiang, Wang Yongzhu, Song Changgui, Zhang Yonggang, Zhang Zhongyun, Zhang Maoying, Zhang Guozhi, Zhang Shuqing, Zhang Gaoyun Zhang Chaotai, Lu Xiaoping, Chen Zixiang, Chen Yongkang, Chen Kexing, Chen Zhongshan, Chen Guisheng, Chen Bacai, Ji Guixing, Jin Xun, Zhou Xilin, Zhao Hanrong, Zhao Xueke, Zhao Guixiang, Hao Xianlin, Mao Yunfang, Qin Suping, Gu Xiulan, Gu Zongyuan, Qian Yunlin, Qian Songyan, Xu Yiping, Xu Youlan, Xu Zhiqi, Xu Caizhen, Weng Yongqing, Gao Jinyuan, Guo Gongju, Guo Suyang, Pu Fudi, Tao Qinan, Huang Lixing, Huang Zishan, Sheng Guiyuan, Peng Chong, Peng Chuanyou, Dong Jiageng, Jiang Guitong, Han Benchu, Zhang Jiazhong, Fu Lingxian, Qiang Qinmei, Teng Chunjiang, Pan Wenlong, Xue Zhenhan, Wei Abao	93	
1978	5th	Ding Jiyun, Ding Guangxun, Diao Sanjiu, Ma Guorui, Ma Quanyuan, Wang Yixiang, Wang Yucun, Wang Yonggang, Wang Yongfu, Wang Xiuying, Wang Xueren, Wang Henglan, Wang Fulin, Qiu Yonggao, Fang Zhen, Kong Buyu, Ba Yikai, Lu Liangshu, Lu Yanhao, Ye Shengtao, Tian Maogen, Feng Maolun, Zhu Xia, Zhu Xiangduo, Fu Xiangjin, Ren Baode, Liu Guangdong, Liu Tonghe, Liu Guojun, Liu Shuxun, Tang Rujin, Tang Yinqiao, Qi Mingfa, Xu Jiatun, Sun Yingfang, Mou Zengshan, Hua Youming, Su Helin, Du Ziwei, Li Ziliang, Li Yu, Li Qingkui, Li Mingyang, Li Guiying, Yang Naizhen, Yang Tingbao, Yang Ming, Wu Yifang, Wu Caifen, Wu Shuqin Wu Weiji, He Binghao, Xin Shaobo, Shen Weiqun, Shen Ruojuan, Shen Ying, Shen Peihua, Song Changgui, Zhang Zhongliang, Zhang Qilong, Zhang Azhou, Zhang Guoping, Zhang Jianshe, Zhang Shuwu, Zhang Binglin, Zhang Yuzhe, Zhang Jiqing, Lu Zhengyou, Lu Tan, Chen Zixiang, Chen Zhaoxiong, Chen Ketian, Chen Guisheng, Chen Libi, Chen Caidi, Fan Cunzhong, Fan Qinhua, Ji Fang, Ji Guixing, Jin Rubao, Jin Xun, Zhou Erhui, Zhou Shouxian, Zheng Chunmao, Shan Zongsu, Zhao Guixiang, Zhao Zhangqing, Hu Da'e, Hu Hong, Hu Naiqiu, Hou Jinghao, Yu Jingzhong, Gong Weizhen, Li Chengyi, Jia Shizhen, Xia Zhenghe, Gu Yueyan, Gu Jiegang, Gu Xilin, Yan XifeiQian Songyan, Xu Huilan, Xi Yuanling, Gao Changming, Gao Jiyu, Tang Zhigao, Tang Shitai, Tao Qinan, Huang Lixing, Huang Zishan, Huang Jialiang, Cao Wennian, Cao Fengdi, Sui Yuanqing, Sheng Guiyuan, Kang Aixuan, Zhang Renkai, Zhang Ruiying, Peng Chuanyou, Si Xia, Dong Jincai, Jiang Lixin, Jiang Chunsong, Han Benchu, Hui Yuyu, Cheng Xuansheng, Fu Lingxian, Cai Heying, Pan Wenlong, Xue Guowei, Dai Weiran	131	
1983	6th	Ding Guangxun, Yu Daowen, Ma Xusheng, Wang Yixiang, Wang Youzhen, Wang Daxuan, Wang Hourun, Wang Chao, Wei Yu, Bian Shaolan, Fang Ming, Lu Yanhao, Ye Ganyun, Shi Liang, Feng Yuanzhen, Feng Ruilin, Feng Duan, Lü Shuxiang, Lü Baowei, Zhu Pingchou, Zhu Siming, Zhu Jian, Zhu Xia, Fu Xiangjin, Hua Luogeng, Liu Jian, Liu Shuxun, Liu Ruilong, Xu Jiatun, Sun Jiazheng, Sun Han, Yan Keqiang, Yan Meimei, Du Ziwei, Li Guangyi, Li Qingkui, Li Zongyu, Li Jiankui, Li Shunzhu, Li Shouzhang, Li Detao, Yang Yongyi, Yang Ming, Yang Nianzu, Yang Jiayin, Wu Renbao, Wu Zhengshan, Wu Lipin, Wu Guangnan, Wu Zhonghua, Wu Guojin Wu Shuqin, Wu Xijun, Wu Huili, He Renhua, He Binghao, He Fushuo, Wang Bingshi, Sha Qiliang, Shen Jian, Zhang Yunwu, Zhang Yonglai, Zhang Azhou, Zhang Jilong, Zhang Meifang, Zhang Yuzhe, Zhang Juanfen, Zhang Jiqing, Zhang Xuwu, Zhang Fuying, Lu Yan, Chen Yongkang, Chen Zhida, Chen Qiuhua, Chen Xiaohua, Chen Yishan, Fan Cunzhong, Mao Yisheng, Mao Yugong, Luo Yunlai, Ji Fangzhen, Zhou Pingguo, Zhou Erhui, Fu Peisheng, Shan Zongsu, Meng Aizhi, Hu Ningsheng, Hu Fuming, Liu Dagang, Hou Jingao, Huan Xiangbao, Huan Jihe, Fei Guifen, He Shan'an, Yuan Weimin, Gu Xiulian, Gu Songfen, Gu Ping, Qian Xiaoping, Qian YuanjunQian Songyan, Qian Jiahuan, Xu Tonghe, Xu Zhiqi, Xu Yingrui, Yin Ruonan, Weng Xinhe, Ling Qihong, Tang Minmin, Tan Wenyu, Tao Peifen, Huang Shuxiang, Huang Zishan, Huang Binzhao, Cao Fengdi, Cao Wan, Sheng Jialian, Zhang Chenhuan, Zhang Ruiying, Peng Chong, Si Xia, Dong Jincai, Jiang Yongping, Jiang Jianhua, Han Benchu, Han Peixin, Ji Yuexiang, Cheng Weigao, Cheng Xuansheng, Fu Haiquan, Chu Jiang, Tong Chaoming, Zeng Tao, Dou Guoren, Guan Junxiang, Zhai Weiliang, Xiong Yi, Pan Duo, Xue Muqiao, Wei Chuandu	140	
1988	7th	Ding Guangxun, Ma Chunhua, Ma Dezan, Wang Guangde, Wang Donglin, Wang Huaiping, Wang Hongmin, Wang Hengsheng, Wang Zufeng, Wang Zhenkun, Wei Yu, You Jianqi, Ai Defu, Lu Yanhao, Ye Ganyun, Ye Huiying, Feng Duan, Kuang Peizi, Qu Qinyue, Lü Shuxiang, Lü Baowei, Zhu Dazhou, Zhu Siming, Zhu Jian, Zhu Jiabi, Hua Baoliang, Liu Jian, Xu Zhonglin, Xu Xianzong, Xu Jialu, Sun Changshu, Sun Jiazheng, Sun Han, Yan Keqiang, Du Ziwei, Li Yukun, Li Jilin, Li Qingkui, Li Yingyun, Li Peiyou, Li Rongqi, Li Bingcai, Li Shenzhi, Li Detao, Yang Zhiming, Yang Yinshan, Yang Nianzu, Wu Renbao, Wu Donghua, Wu Guang Nan, Wu Zhonghua, Wu Binrong, Wu Xijun, Wu Rong, She Feng, Wang Renbiao, Sha Qiliang, Shen Fuchen, Zhang Azhou, Zhang Songlin, Zhang Fusheng, Zhang Meifang, Zhang Jiqing, Zhang Xuwu, Zhang Yaohua, Lu Wenfu, Lu Tan, Chen Li, Chen Zhida, Chen Senhui, Chen Xisheng, Chen Yuzhen, Chen Suiheng, Chen Bixian, Shao Hongze, Fan Jiexia, Zhou Zhongying, Zhou Jie, Zhou Chunqin, Zhou Er, Zhao Wenjuan, Zhao Jishi, Hu Ningsheng, Hu Lian, Hu Min, Yu Xingde, Jiang Xiulan, Jiang Qiwen, Huan Jihe, Fei Xiaotong, Yao Fubao, He Jishun, He Shan'an, Qin Zhaozhen, Jia Peide, Gu Yongjun, Gu Xiulian, Qian Xiaoping, Qian Yi, Qian JiahuanXu Yongzhen, Xu Tonghe, Xu Yingrui, Xu Kunrong, Xu Mei, Xu Yan, Yin Ruonan, Weng Xinhe, Gao Zheng, Tang Nianci, Tang Guanhuai, Tang Hongbin, Tao Peifen, Huang Yongyan, Cao Wan, Gong Weixin, Sheng Jialian, Zhang Shiming, Zhang Ruiying, Peng Chong, Peng Jinsheng, Si Xia, Dong Shitang, Dong Xueling, Jiang Lijin, Han Peixin, Chu Jiang, Zeng Huapeng, Yu Zhenxin, Xie Ruiqin, Dou Guoren, Pei Kaoen, Tan Quanhai, Pan Duo, Pan Junzheng, Xue Feng, Dai Shunzhi, Wei Shaofen	138	
1993	8th	Ding Peiling, Wang Liqian, Wang Xilong, Wang Huaiping, Wang Hongmin, Wang Dingwu, Wang Rongbing, Wang Zhenhua, Wang Shu, Wei Yu, You Jianqi, You Junming, Fang Zhizhuo, Gan Liming, Ai Defu, Ye Ruchun, Ye Huiying, Feng Duan, Kuang Peizi, Qu Qinyue, Zhu Zhenglin, Zhu Siming, Zhu Jiabi, Hua Baoliang, Zhuang Yinfang, Liu Xiufan, Liu Hezhang, Xu Zhongxing, Xu Jialu, Su Dingqiang, Du Xuebin, Li Congfu, Li Yukun, Li Jilin, Li Xianguo, Li Jinhua, Li Bingcai, Li Gaolan, Wu Renbao, Wu Donghua, Wu Guangying, Wu Guangnan, Wu Xijun, Zou Jiaxiang, Wang Yang, Shen Daren, Shen Xinsun, Shen Daoqi, Zhang Yueqin, Zhang Fengyang Zhang Azhou, Zhang Houbao, Zhang Meifang, Zhang Hongxi, Zhang Jiqing, Zhang Ni, Zhang Yaohua, Lu Wenfu, Lu Shouzeng, Lu Xueyi, Lu Jing, Chen Cichang, Chen Guanjun, Chen Xiangxing, Chen Huanyou, Chen Senhui, Chen Xisheng, Chen Yuzhen, Chen Suiheng, Shao Rongshi, Fan Guangrong, Fan Jinming, Ji Yunshi, Jin Zhongqing, Jin Liu, Zhou Dachun, Zhou Xiuji, Zhou Guijuan, Zheng Jian, Zheng Juanhua, Mi Zhongye, Meng Jinyuan, Zhao Shaolin, Zhao Wenjuan, Zhao Shouquan, Zhao Qiseng, Zhao Jinxiang, Zhao Miaosen, Rong Jikai, Hu Fuming, Hu Defang, Yu Jingzhong, Shi Xuedao, Jiang Xiulan, Hong Jinxin, Fei Xiaotong, Xu Chuanzhu, Yao Kaibiao, Yao Fubao, Yuan ShizhuGu Yongjun, Gu Huangchu, Qian Xiaoping, Qian Weimin, Qian Yi, Ni Huisheng, Xu Yunjin, Xu Yushi, Xu Shousheng, Xu Qiyao, Xu Deyu, Xu Yan, Weng Pingguang, Ling Fugen, Gao Zhijun, Tang Nianci, Cao Hongming, Gong Zeming, Zhang Shiming, Zhang Ruiying, Zhang Xinsheng, Yi Junyi, Peng Jinsheng, Dong Shitang, Jiang Lijin, Han Peixin, Cheng Huiming, Fu Shouzhong, Xie Meilan, Yu Zhenxin, Dou Guoren, Cai Xiumin, Tan Zhongxing, Tan Quanhai, Pan Yile, Pan Duo, Wei Shaofen	137	
1998	9th	Ding Peiling, Ding Jiemin, Yu Guangzhou, Yu Shunhua, Yu Jifen, Wang Yongshun, Wang Xingya, Wang Huaiping, Wang Hongmin, Wang Linyun, Wang Zhenhua, Mao Hongmei, Gong Pixiang, Fang Xi, Yin Guoxin, Gan Liming, Ai Jinmei, Ye Jian, Bao Wenxia, Feng Lanming, Feng Suxiang, Feng Jianqin, Guo Xiangqin, Hui Liangyu (Hui nationality), Zhu Wuhua, Zhu Zhenglin, Zhu Jianping, Zhu Jiabi, Zhu Ping, Zhuang Yinfang, Liu Xiufan, Liu Hezhang, Xu Zhongzi, Xu Zhongxing, Sun Jianguo, Ji Caihong, Hua Farong, Su Dingqiang, Li Yukun, Li Xianguo, Li Quanlin, Li Lanqing, Li Qing, Li Yunan, Li Lei, Yang Guozhen, Yang Guiping, Shi Kuang, Wu Yousheng, Wu Meiqin Wu Ruilin, Wu Xinxiong, He Chunlin, She Yihe, Sha Chunyuan (Hui nationality), Shen Wenrong, Shen Daren, Shen Xinsun, Shen Qipeng, Shen Zhujiang, Shen Fuxiang, Song Chengyu, Zhang Dachun, Zhang Yutai, Zhang Xusheng, Zhang Huaixi, Zhang Pinhua, Zhang Hongxi, Zhang Xiong, Zhang Ni, Zhang Han, Lu Weiguo, Lu Xueyi, Chen Wannian, Chen Yejun, Chen Ming, Chen Huanyou, Chen Xiangling, Chen Xisheng, Chen Deming, Shao Rongshi, Luo Yuling, Ji Yunshi, Jin Yiming, Jin Huaiyou, Zhou Daping, Zhou Xiaotong, Zhou Gucheng, Zhou Xiuji, Zhou Sangyi, Zhou Yaoting, Zheng Daci, Zheng Silin, Meng Jinyuan, Zhao Qiseng, Zhao Xuefeng, Hao Bo, Rong Jikai, Hu Defang, Bai SuningHou Jianwei, Yu Xingde, Yu Jingzhong, Shi Xuedao, Jiang Yongrong, Jiang Zhe, Jiang Deming, Yao Zhenyan, Yao Fubao, Qin Shunting, Xia Geng, Gu Xiang, Gu Guanqun, Gu Xiaosong, Gu Hao, Gu Huangchu, Gu Yulin, Qian Yuebao, Qian Hongling, Qian Yi, Qian Haixin, Xu Jiaji, Xu Deyu, Guo Xiaoding, Huang Weiyi, Huang Cuiyu, Cao Youxuan, Cao Hongming, Sheng Huaren, Cui Guiliang, Yan Chengmi, Jiang Jin, Jiang Shusheng, Cheng Yamin, Fu Shouzhong, Tong Fu, Xie Meilan, Lou Wenying, Yu Yunyao, Yu Zhimin, Cai Xiumin, Guan Xiaohong, Tan Quanhai, Zhai Haohui, Xiong Cuihua (Hui), Miao Changwen, Yan Fuxing, Pan Yile, Pan Duo (Tibetan), Xue Shouqin, Mu Xinan, Ju Baocai	151	
2003	10th	Ding Dawei, Wang Longfang (female), Wang Sheng, Wang Yonghe (female), Wang Yongshun, Wang Fang (female), Wang Wu (female), Wang Wulong, Wang Rong, Wang Haoliang, Wang Bintai, Wang Deli (female), Mao Hongmei (female), Qiu Zhongwen, Gong Pixiang, Fang Yixin, Yin Guoxin, Yin Jinlai, Ai Jinmei (female), Zuo Chengqin (female), Zuo Qunsheng, Lu Kesong, Shi Heping, Shi Zhenhua, Feng Yi, Guo Xiangqin (female), Hui Liangyu (Hui nationality), Zhu Guoping, Zhu Xiaomin, Zhu Jiabi, Zhu Shanping (female), Ren Yanshen, Liu Liren, Liu Yongzhong, Liu Zhaoqin, Liu Litao (female), Liu Xiufan, Liu Heng, Liu Hezhang, Jiang Bo (female), Xu Liangfei, Sun Hanming, Sun Qing, Sun Anhua, Ji Fenggao, Yan Shaohua, Yan Yixin, Yan Jun, Li Lianning, Li Jiping, Li Yuanchao, Li Lei (female), Yang Weize, Yang Shengming, Yang Guozhen, Yang Tao, Yang Zhanli, Yang Zhen, Shu Pengye (female), Xiao Tongyou, Shi Kuang, Wu Ruilin, He Daping, He Chunlin, Yu Shiyuan, Zou Jianping, Wang Chunyun (female), Shen Xinsun, Shen Qipeng, Shen Jian, Song Yulin, Zhang Hong (female), Zhang Lianzhen (female), Zhang Guoliang, Zhang Yanlei, Zhang Suping (female), Zhang Xiangning, Zhang Xinshi, Lu Qin (female), Chen Changfeng, Chen Lichang, Chen Xianyan, Chen Xiulan (female), Chen Zongqi, Chen Huanyou, Chen Huijuan (female), Chen Jingyi (female), Chen Xin, Shao Zhenzhong, Wu Jijun, Fan Xixing, Fan Yanqing, Yu Meilan (female), Yi Xin, Luo Zhijun, Ji Jianye, Zhou LaishuiZhou Jianping, Zhou Housong, Zhou Yinmei (female), Zhou Yaoting, Zheng Daci, Zheng Ya, Meng Xianzong, Zhao Changsheng (Manchu), Zhao Peng, Hu Siyi, Hou Jianwei (female), Jiang Yunbao, Jiang Zhe, Jiang Enzhu, Jiang Deming, Hong Tianhui (female), Zhu Yicai, Qin Shijia, Qin Zhishang, Xia Ming, Xia Dequan, Gu Fengxiang, Gu Guanqun, Gu Xiaosong, Gu Huiqi, Chai Xinjian, Qian Yunzhu (female), Qian Yuebao (female), Qian Hongling (female), Qian Yi (Female), Qian Haixin, Xu Changjiang, Xu Zhengning, Xu Anbi, Xu Hongyan (female), Xu Rongchun, Xu Xiaoyang, Xu Jingren, Gao Qing, Gao Dekang, Guo Xiaoding, Cao Weixing, Cao Fulong, Cui Guiliang, Zhang Junyuan, Liang Baohua, Jiang Shusheng, Jiang Wanqiu (female), Tong Fu, Lou Wenying (female), Guan Xiaohong (female), Xiong Cuihua (female, Hui nationality), Miao Xiexing, Miao Changwen, Pan Yile, Pan Yonghe, Mu Xinan, Dai Xingwang, Ju Zhangwang .	156	
2008	11th	Ding Dawei, Ma Chengzhi, Wang Guangji, Wang Longfang (female), Wang Sheng, Wang Weicheng, Wang Shouting, Wang Fang (female), Wang Wu (female), Wang Haoliang, Wang Jingcheng, Wang Yanwen (female), Mao Xiaoping, Mao Weiming, Qiu Zhongwen, Gong Pixiang, Fang Yixin, Yin Guoxin, Zuo Hong (female), Lu Kesong, Ye Youwei, Shen Xiangqin (female), Lü Zhenlin, Zhu Ping, Zhu Yongxin, Zhu Guoping, Zhu Shanping (female), Qiao Xiaoyang, Liu Yongzhong, Liu Qingnian, Liu Litao (female), Liu Shenlin, Liu Ling (female), Liu Jinlan, Liu Fan, Yan Lijuan (female), Xu Jinrong (female), Sun Gongsheng, Sun Yuyi, Sun Xiufang (female), Sun Qixin, Sun Guoqing (female), Sun Piaoyang, Du Guoling (female), Li Yunfeng, Li Quanlin, Li Qiang, Li Yuanchao, Yang Zhan Li, Yang Xinli, Yang Qun, Yang Zhen, Xiao Wei, Wu Guoping, Wu Xiaobei (female), He Daping, He Jianzhong, Yu Shiyuan, Zou Jianping, Wang Chunyun (female), Sha Jiahao (Hui nationality), Shen Jinjin, Shen Jian, Song Yulan (female), Song Yulin, Zhang Dafu, Zhang Weiguo, Zhang Hong (female), Zhang Guoliang, Zhang Bin, Zhang Xiangning, Lu Yaping (female), Lu Qin (female), Chen Lichang, Chen Xianyan, Chen Honghong (female), Chen Lifen (female), Chen Xiulan (female), Chen Zongqi, Chen Jiabao, Chen Jun, Chen Ping (female), Chen Jingyi (female), Chen Jingyu, Chen Zhenning, Chen Yanping (female), Chen Xin, Shao Yong, Shao Min (female), Wu Jijun, Miao Yi, Lin Xiangguo, Yi Hong, Yi Xin, Luo Zhijun, Zhou Wenzhou, Zhou Li (female), Zhou Yinmei(Female), Zheng Silin, Shan Xiaoming (female), Meng Xianzong, Zhao Changsheng (Manchu), Zhao Fengqi, Hu Mei (female), Hu Jintao, Ke Jun, Cha Peixin, Bai Suning (female), Jiang Zhe, Xuan Xiaoquan, Zhu Yicai, Fei Shengying, Yao Jianhua, Suo Lisheng, Gu Xiaosong, Chai Xinjian, Qian Yuebao (female), Qian Haixin, Xu An, Xu Anbi, Xu Ming, Xu Jingren, Yin Yunfei, Gao Dekang, Gao Yijin, Guo Guangyin (female), Guo Rong, Tang Yan (Female), Tao Siyan, Tao Haixia (female), Huang Zhendong, Cao Weixing, Cao Xinping, Cui Guiliang, Zhang Qing, Yan Li, Yan Jianguo, Liang Baohua, Ge Fei (female), Dong Caiping, Jiang Hongkun, Jiang Jianhua, Jiang Wanqiu (female), Han Liming (female), Cheng Junrong, Yu Yunyao, Dou Xiping (female, Manchu), Cai Fang, Pei Changcai (female), Miao Xiexing, Miao Changwen, Miao Ruilin, Fan Jinlong, Yan Kai, Pan Yonghe, Xue Yusheng, Dai Yaping (female)	157	
2013	12th	Ding Rongyu, Yu Xuejun, Yu Tiemin, ~~Wan Jianmin~~, Wang Guangji, Wang Fang (female), Wang Liping, Wang Mingwei, Wang Yonghong (female), Wang Min (female), Wang Jingcheng, Wang Yanwen (female), Shi Heping, Bai Liqun, Xing Dingyu, Quan Taiqi (female), Bi Yurui, Qu Futian, Zhu Ping, Zhu Min, Zhu Minyang, Zhu Kejiang, Zhu Guoping, Zhu Changyao, Zhu Hong (female), Zhu Xiaoming (female), Zhu Shanping (female), Qiao Xiaoyang, Zhuang Yumin (female), Liu Weigao, Liu Ling (female), Liu Jinlan, Liu Fan, Yan Lijuan (female), Xu Qianfei, Sun Zhijun, Sun Xiufang (female), Sun Guoqing (female), Sun Jiaguang, Sun Piaoyang, Yan Junqi (female), Su Zhen (female), Du Guoling (female), Li Xiaomin, Li Yehong (female), Li Sheng, Li Xueyong Li Suyan (female), Li Qing, Li Zhiyong, Li Yuanchao, Yang Shengshi, Yang Qun, Yang Zhen, Xiao Wei, Wu Peiliang, Wu Guoping, Wu Xiaobei (female), He Quan, He Daping, He Jianzhong, Yu Ruiyu (female), Zou Jianping, Sha Jiahao (Hui nationality), Shen Jinjin, Shen Jian, Zhang Weiguo, Zhang Yuangui, Zhang Hong (female), Zhang Guohua, Zhang Qiuxiang (female), Zhang Yan (female), Lu Yaping (female), Lu Chunyun, Chen Yunhua, Chen Lifen (female), Chen Ruolin (female), Chen Shaoze, Chen Jiabao, Chen Jun, Chen Mengmeng, Chen Jinshi, Chen Jingyu, Chen Xin, Wu Jijun, Miao Yi, Lin Zhimei (female), Lin Xiangguo, Yi Hong, Luo Jin (female), Luo Zhijun, Ji ~~Jianye~~, Jin Zhengyu, Zhou Naixiang, Zhou Licheng, Zhou Lan (female), Zhou Yi, Zhou XuedongZhou Suming, Zhou Shanhong, Shan Yecai, Zhao Rifeng, Zhao Yafu, Hu Mei (female), Hu Ming (female), Zan Shengda, Jiang Xihui, Xuan Xiaoquan, Yao Xiaodong, Qin Guangwei (female), Qin Zhenling, Yuan Shouqi, Gu Yunling, Qian Yuebao (female), Qian Haixin, Ni Tao, Xu Yiping, Xu Changjiang, Xu An, Xu Rujun, Xu Ming, Xu Rongchun, Xu Guoping, Xu Jingren, Yin Yunfei, Gao Dekang, Gao Yijin, Cao Yong, Sheng Guangzu, Cui Xiangqun (female), Cui Guiliang, Cui Genliang, Cui Tiejun, Ge Fei (female), Dong Caiping, Jiang Yuxia (female), Jiang Hongkun, Jiang Wanqiu (female), Lan Shaomin, Dou Xiping (female, Manchu), Cai Fang, Pei Changcai (female), Zhai Huqu, Miao Xiexing, Fan Jinlong, Yan Kai, Pan Jianhua, Heng Xin, Dai Yaping (female), Wei Guoqiang	150	
2018	13th	Ding Chun, Ma Qiulin, Wang Jiang, Wang Fang (female), Wang Qin, Wang Chao, Wang Wei, Wang Tianqi, ~~Wang Like (Manchu)~~, Wang Lifeng, Wang Jiyong, Wang Hongjun, Wang Lianchun, Wang Liping, Wang Yifang, Wang Weifeng, Wang Qiangzhong, Wang Jingcheng, Wang Jiapeng, Che Jie, Yin Zhongqing, Long Xiang, Shi Lijun, Fu Hongling (female), Xing Qingsong, Ji Bingxuan, Ji Guifeng (female), Quan Taiqi (female), Lü Jian, Zhu Jing (female), Zhu Xiaokun, Zhuang Yumin (female), Liu Hua (female), Liu Fan, Liu Huaiping, Liu Zhongbin (Hui), Liu Jinlan, Yan Lijuan (female), Sun Guiquan, Sun Jingnan (female), Sun Piaoyang, Du Xiaogang,~~Li Sheng~~Li Qing, Li Wei (female), Li Yehong (female), Li Yaping, Li Xueyong, Li Chengxia (female), Li Hongbin, Li Suyan (female), Li Nannan (female), Yang Zhen, Yang Gengbao, Yang Hengjun, Xiao Wei, Wu Xiangdong, Wu Guoping, Wu Zhenglong, Wu Huifang, He Jianzhong, She Caigao, Yu Ruiyu (female), Leng Rong, Wang Quan, Shen Renfang, Song Yong, Zhang Yong, Zhang Lei, Zhang Yefei, Zhang Lixiang, Zhang Jindong, Zhang Chunsheng, Zhang Xiaobei, Zhang Aijun, Zhang Changning (female), Zhang Daoheng, Lu Yongquan, Lu Yaping (female), Chen Li, Chen Jie, Chen Yuan, Chen Cheng (female), Chen Xin, Chen Lifen (female), Chen Mengmeng, Chen Jinshi, Chen Jingyu, Chen Zhenning, Zhao Qibai, Ouyang Hua, Zhou Licheng, Zhou Suming, Zhou Tie Gen, Zhou Shanhong, Zheng Kuiyang, Xiang Xuelong, Zhao Wei (female), Hu Ye, Hu Mingchun, Ke Jun, Duan Jun (female), Huangfu Litong, Hou Xueyuan, Zan Shengda, Lou Qinjian, Fei Shaoyun, Qin Guangwei (female), Nie Yongping, Mo Yuanhua (female), Xia Daohu, Qian Jiayan (female), Qian Kaifa, Xu Ying, Xu Yiping, Xu Huaqin, Xu Guoping, Xu Jingren, Yin Yong, Weng Mengyong, Gao Sujuan (female), Gao Yijin, Guo Xinming, Tang Jinhai, Tang Huijuan (female), Ling Yi, Cao Hongming, Cui Guiliang, Cui Genliang, Yin Yan, Ge Fei (female), Ge Daokai, Jiang Yuxia (female), Jiang Zhuoqing, Han Liming (female), Jiao Xin'an, Lu Man (female), Lu Peijun, Xie Zhicheng, Lan Shaomin, Dou Xiping (female, Manchu)Cai Fang, Cai Dafeng, Cai Lixin (female), Xiong Sidong,~~Miao Ruilin~~Pan Xueping, Dai Yuan, Dai Yuanhu, Dai Yaping (female).	150	
2023	14th	Ding Jianning, Yu Lijie, Yu Chunsheng, Wan Wenhua, Xi Jinping, Ma Xin, Wang Tianqi, Wang Lifeng, Wang Hongjun, Wang Jinjian, Wang Chi, Wang Xuefeng, Wang Chunxiang, Wang Hong, Wang Jianfeng, Wang Qiangzhong, Wang Jiapeng, Fang Zhuyuan, Deng Dongsheng, Shi Shitai, Shi Lei, Ye Meilan, Tian Guoli, Shi Zhijun, Xing Zhengjun, Xing Qingsong, Ji Lanfang, Lü Jian, Lü Caixia, Zhu Xiaokun, Liu Qing, Liu Fan, Liu Huaiping, Liu Zhongbin, Liu Jingyu, Xu Shansong, Xu Kunlin, Sun Yi, Sun Huaqin, Sun Chunmei, Sun Jingnan, Sun Piaoyang, Li Yihu, Li Min, Li Qiang, Li Yehong, Li Xiaona, Li Chengxia, Li Guihe, Li Hongyao Li Hongbin, Li Nannan, Yang Yong, Yang Zhongjian, Yang Hengjun, Xiao Wei, Wu Lan, Wu Yonghong, Wu Qingwen, Wu Guoping, Wu Huifang, Wu Xinming, He Guanghua, She Caigao, Shen Renfang, Shen Haibin, Song Yan, Zhang Tong, Zhang Naiwen, Zhang Dadong, Zhang Li, Zhang Zhaoli, Zhang Yufei, Zhang Guoliang, Zhang Zhong, Zhang Chunsheng, Zhang Junjie, Zhang Xiaobei, Zhang Xiaowei, Zhang Xiaohong, Zhang Liandong, Zhang Daoheng, Zhang Qiang, Zhang Jin, Zhang Yi, Chen Wei, Chen Jie, Chen Cheng, Chen Hongbin, Chen Zhongwei, Chen Jiangang, Shao Yonghai, Lin Xiaoming, Lin Tianzhong, Ouyang Hua, Zhou Bin, Zhou Shanhong, Shan Zenghai, Lian Yueqin, Zhao Jianjun, Hu GuangjieHu Xiaoli, Ke Jun, Xin Changxing, Zan Shengda, Lou Qinjian, Yao Jianping, Yao Lulu, Mo Yuanhua, Xia Xinmin, Xia Guang, Xia Daohu, Gu Xiangyue, Xu Yao, Xu Yunfei, Xu Guanghui, Xu Haoyu, Xu Shuhai, Yin Yong, Gao Huarui, Gao Jifan, Gao Derong, Huang Ping, Gong Xulong, Sheng Lei, Cui Tiejun, Dong Caiping, Jiang Li, Han Feng, Fu Zhiwei, Chu Yonghong, Lu Man, Xie Zhengyi, Chu Feng, Miao Hangen, Fan Jinlong, Xue Jimin, Xue Jiping, Dai Yong, Wei Qiao, Wei Hua	144	
