= Party Secretary of Jiangsu =

Provincial government position in China

Secretary of the Jiangsu Provincial Committee of the Chinese Communist Party
- 中国共产党江苏省委员会书记
- Emblem of the Chinese Communist Party

- Flag of the Chinese Communist Party

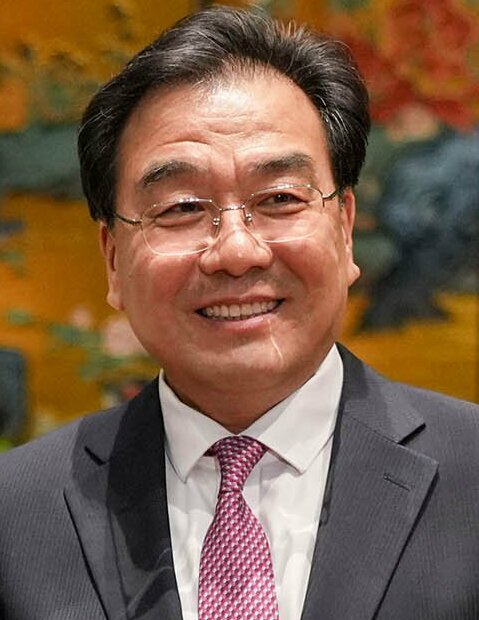
- Incumbent; Xin Changxing since 3 January 2023
- Jiangsu Provincial Committee of the Chinese Communist Party
- Type: Party Committee Secretary
- Status: Provincial and ministerial-level official
- Member of: Jiangsu Provincial Standing Committee
- Nominator: Central Committee
- Appointer: Jiangsu Provincial Committee; Central Committee
- Inaugural holder: Ke Qingshi
- Formation: November 1952
- Deputy: Deputy Secretary; Secretary-General

The secretary of the Jiangsu Provincial Committee of the Chinese Communist Party is the leader of the Jiangsu Provincial Committee of the Chinese Communist Party (CCP). As the CCP is the sole ruling party of the People's Republic of China (PRC), the secretary is the highest ranking post in Jiangsu.

The secretary is officially appointed by the CCP Central Committee based on the recommendation of the CCP Organization Department, which is then approved by the Politburo and its Standing Committee. The secretary can be also appointed by a plenary meeting of the Jiangsu Provincial Committee, but the candidate must be the same as the one approved by the central government. The secretary leads the Standing Committee of the Jiangsu Provincial Committee, and is usually a member of the CCP Central Committee. The secretary leads the work of the Provincial Committee and its Standing Committee. The secretary is outranks the governor, who is generally the deputy secretary of the committee.

The current secretary is Xin Changxing, who took office on 3 January 2023.

== List of party secretaries ==
No.	Image	Name	Term start	Term end	Ref.
1		Ke Qingshi (1902–1965)	November 1952	August 1954	
2		Jiang Weiqing (1910–2000)	August 1954	1967	
Cultural Revolution Interregnum			1967	1970	
3		Xu Shiyou (1906–1985)	December 1970	January 1974	
4		Peng Chong (1915–2010)	January 1974	February 1977	
5		Xu Jiatun (1916–2016)	February 1977	April 1983	
6		Han Peixin (1921–2017)	April 1983	December 1989	
7		Shen Daren (1928–2017)	December 1989	September 1993	
8		Chen Huanyou (born 1934)	September 1993	December 1999	
9		Hui Liangyu (born 1944)	December 1999	December 2002	
10		Li Yuanchao (born 1950)	December 2002	October 2007	
11		Liang Baohua (born 1945)	October 2007	6 December 2010	
12		Luo Zhijun (born 1951)	6 December 2010	30 June 2016	
13		Li Qiang (born 1959)	30 June 2016	29 October 2017	
14		Lou Qinjian (born 1956)	29 October 2017	19 October 2021	
15		Wu Zhenglong (born 1964)	19 October 2021	28 December 2022	
16		Xin Changxing (born 1963)	3 January 2023	Incumbent	
