= Li Yuanchao =

Vice President of China from 2013 to 2018

- 李源潮
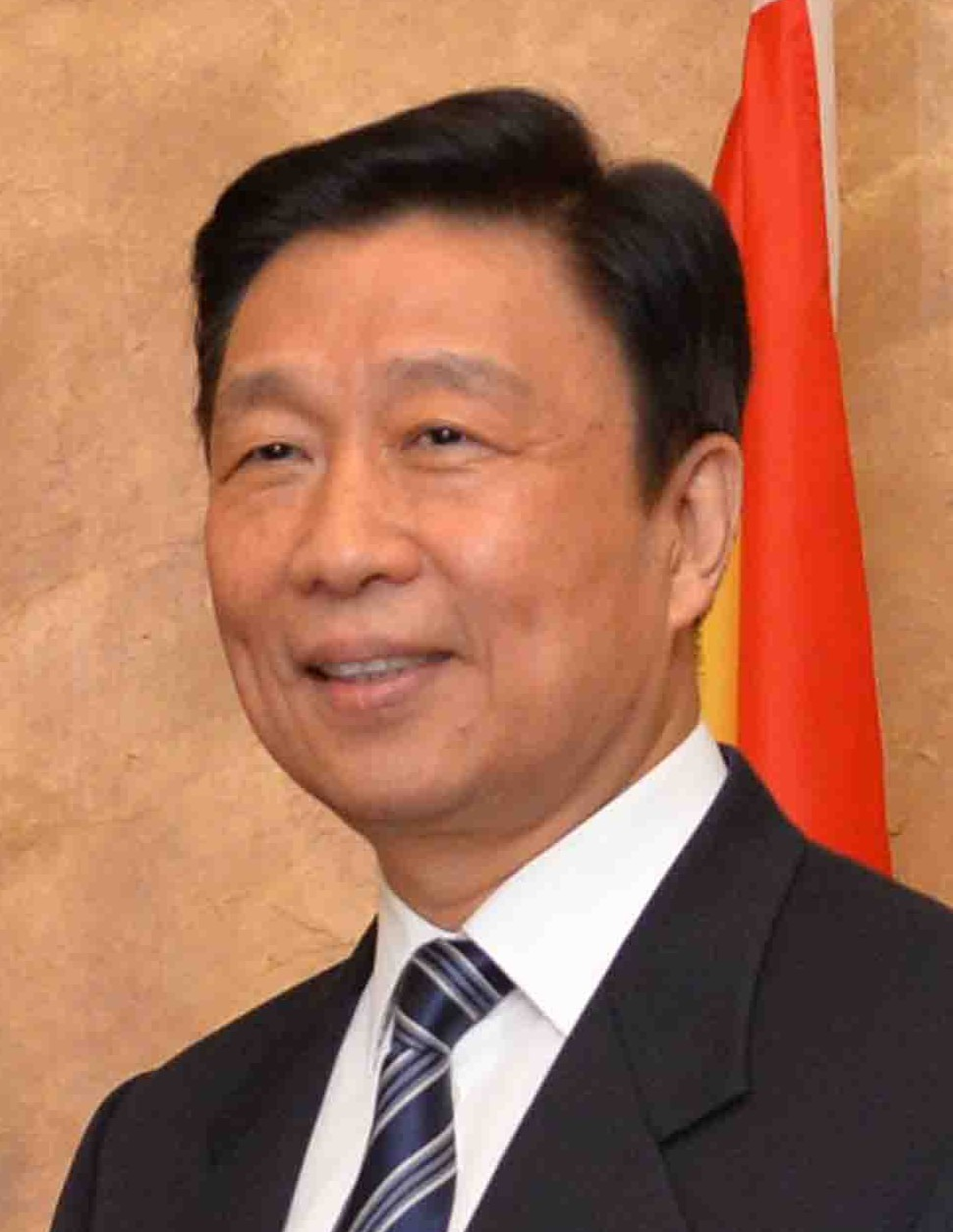
- Li in 2016

Vice President of China
- In office 14 March 2013 – 17 March 2018
- President: Xi Jinping
- Preceded by: Xi Jinping
- Succeeded by: Wang Qishan

Head of the Organization Department of the Chinese Communist Party
- In office 22 October 2007 – 19 November 2012
- Deputy: Shen Yueyue, others
- General Secretary: Hu Jintao
- Preceded by: He Guoqiang
- Succeeded by: Zhao Leji

Party Secretary of Jiangsu
- In office December 2002 – October 2007
- Governor: Luo Zhijun
- Preceded by: Hui Liangyu
- Succeeded by: Liang Baohua

Personal details
- Born: 20 November 1950 (age 75) Lianshui County, Jiangsu, China
- Party: Chinese Communist Party (1978–present)
- Education: East China Normal University; Fudan University; Peking University; Central Party School

Li Yuanchao
- Chinese: 李源潮
Transcriptions
Standard Mandarin
- Hanyu Pinyin: Lǐ Yuáncháo
- Wade–Giles: Li Yüan-ch'ao

Li Yuanchao (born 20 November 1950) is a retired Chinese politician. He was the Vice President of China from 2013 to 2018 and the Honorary President of the Red Cross Society of China. He was a member of the Secretariat of the Chinese Communist Party and head of the Organization Department between 2007 and 2012. From 2002 to 2007, Li served as the Chinese Communist Party Secretary of Jiangsu, the top leader of an area of significant economic development. Between 2007 and 2017, he held a seat for two terms on the Politburo of the Chinese Communist Party.

Li Yuanchao played an important role in the reform and opening up under Chinese leaders Deng Xiaoping and Chen Yun. He studied mathematics at university, and in 1983, Shanghai party chief Chen Pixian recommended Li Yuanchao to head the Shanghai Communist Youth League organization. Once considered a rising political star, Li gradually faded from the political scene.

== Biography ==
=== Early life and career ===
Li was born in 1950 in Lianshui County, Huai'an city, Jiangsu province, to Li Gancheng (李干成), a Communist Party official and later vice mayor of Shanghai, and Lü Jiying (吕继英), a Communist revolutionary from Shuyang County in northern Jiangsu province. He was the fourth son among their seven children and was named Yuanchao (援朝) after the "campaign to aid North Korea." Later in life, he would change the characters of this name to 源潮 while maintaining the pronunciation Yuanchao. Li attended Shanghai High School in Shanghai, where he graduated in 1966, shortly prior to the Cultural Revolution. During the Cultural Revolution, he worked in Dafeng County, Jiangsu, performing manual labour.

In 1973, Li was recommended to enter East China Normal University to study mathematics. He then worked as a teacher at the Nanchang Secondary School in Shanghai, then an instructor at the industry vocational college of Luwan District in Shanghai. After the resumption of the National College Entrance Examination Li was admitted to pursue a master's degree from Fudan University in mathematics. He joined the Chinese Communist Party in June 1978. In 1981, after graduating, he stayed at Fudan to teach as a lecturer and held a leadership position in the Communist Youth League organization of the university.

In 1983, Li was promoted on recommendation from then Shanghai party chief Chen Pixian to head the Shanghai Communist Youth League organization at age 32. Shortly thereafter he became a member of the Central Secretariat of the Communist Youth League, in charge of propaganda and ideology. He served in the post until 1991. During his time at the Youth League, Li obtained through part-time study a master's degree in economic management from Peking University under the supervision of economist Li Yining, and a doctoral degree (also on a part-time basis) in law from the Central Party School in 1998.

In March 2019, Agence France-Presse reported that 20 paragraphs of his doctoral dissertation Some Issues Concerning the Production of Socialist Culture and Art had been plagiarised from a thesis written by Zhang Mingeng.

In 1993, Li was named deputy head of the State Council Information Office. In 1996, he became Vice Minister of Culture. In 2001, he pursued mid-career training at the John F. Kennedy School of Government at Harvard University.

=== Jiangsu ===
In 2001, Li was elevated to Deputy Party Secretary of Jiangsu province and concurrently party secretary of the provincial capital Nanjing. In October 2001, a mere month after he took office, Li garnered attention by firing several municipal officials accused of sexually harassing female hotel employees.

At the 16th Party Congress held in 2002, Li failed to secure a seat to the Central Committee and was elected only an alternate member. However, at the time of the election, Li had already been agreed upon by senior party leaders to serve in the top post in Jiangsu, causing an awkward and rare situation where Li would serve as a party chief of a major province without holding a full seat on the Central Committee.

Li served as the Party Secretary of Jiangsu between 2002 and 2007. During his tenure in Jiangsu, Li assessed local officials in terms of performance measured by social and environmental factors, as opposed to purely economic ones. In response to the corruption case of Xu Guojian, the head of the provincial Organization Department, Li said, "Jiangsu is beginning the biggest anti-corruption drive since the founding of the People's Republic."

=== Politburo ===
Seen as an ally of General Secretary Hu Jintao and a member of the tuanpai due to his Communist Youth League background, Li became a member of the Politburo of the Chinese Communist Party and the head of the Organization Department of the Chinese Communist Party after the 17th Party Congress in October 2007. After the 18th Party Congress, Li Yuanchao was no longer the head of the Organization Department of the Chinese Communist Party. Since 19 November 2012, his successor is Zhao Leji. Li was said to favour political reform.

During the 2012 National Congress of the CCP, Li was considered a contender for promotion to the Politburo Standing Committee but was blocked by former general secretary Jiang Zemin, in what was seen as a major defeat for Hu Jintao. However, he continued to serve on the 25-member Politburo, for which he was first selected in 2007.

=== Vice president ===
In March 2013, Li was elected to be the Vice President. The post of vice-president had been held since 1998 by the top-ranked Secretary of the party's Secretariat; Li's selection as vice president broke this fifteen-year convention; this meant Li was also the first vice-president without a seat on the Politburo Standing Committee since 1998. Since taking on the office, which is largely ceremonial in nature, Li played a major role in foreign affairs. He served as the deputy leader of the Foreign Affairs Leading Group, the main foreign affairs coordination body of the Communist Party, and the deputy leader of the Central Coordination Group for Hong Kong and Macau Affairs. Li was the most senior Chinese official to attend the state memorial of South African leader Nelson Mandela, the state funeral of Cuban leader Fidel Castro and the state funeral of Singapore's founding leader Lee Kuan Yew. Li left the Politburo after the 19th Party Congress in October 2017.

In 2018, Li retired from office and was succeeded by Vice President Wang Qishan.

== Publication ==
Book: The Strategic Choice for China's Prosperity (English Version), Published in Dec. 2018, South Ocean Publishing House, Singapore. Specially for congratulation to China's 40th Anniversary of Reform and Opening-up. Li Yuanchao is one of the 4 authors. The others include Li Yining, Meng Xiaosu, Li Keqiang. Translated from Chinese by Shi Guangjun and Jiang Hongxing.

Political offices
Preceded by Xi Jinping	Vice President of China; 2013–2018	Succeeded by Wang Qishan
Assembly seats
Preceded by Chen Huanyou	Chairman of Jiangsu Provincial People's Congress; 2003–2007	Succeeded by Wang Shouting
Party political offices
Preceded by He Guoqiang	Head of Organization Department of the Chinese Communist Party; 2007–2012	Succeeded by Zhao Leji
Preceded by Hui Liangyu	Party Secretary of Jiangsu; 2002–2007	Succeeded by Liang Baohua
Preceded by Wang Wulong	Party Secretary of Nanjing; 2001–2003	Succeeded by Luo Zhijun
Honorary titles
Preceded by Hu Jintao	Honorary President of the Red Cross Society of China; 2015–2018	Succeeded by Wang Qishan
