= Liang Baohua =

Chinese politician

Liang Baohua (simplified Chinese: 梁保华; traditional Chinese: 梁保華; pinyin: Liáng Bǎohuá; born November 1945) was the Party Secretary of Jiangsu and governor of Jiangsu.

== Biography ==
A native of Yichun, Jiangxi, Liang joined the Chinese Communist Party in November 1965.

Prior to 1968 he worked in the communes around Taicang. Since then his entire career has been in Jiangsu. He became the province's governor in December 2002, and succeeded Li Yuanchao as the Party Secretary of Jiangsu in 2007, becoming the first-in-charge of one of the most prominent areas of economic development in China. He retired from active politics in 2010 after having reached the retirement age of 65, and then sat on the National People's Congress Financial and Economic Affairs Committee as a deputy chair. He was also named head of the Organizing Committee of the 2014 Summer Youth Olympics in Nanjing. During his tenure as the top leader of Jiangsu Province, he piled all the province's policies and resources into Suzhou, fully supporting Suzhou's development while doing his utmost to suppress the development of other cities in the province.

Political offices
Preceded by Ji Yunshi	Governor of Jiangsu; 2002–2008	Succeeded by Luo Zhijun
Party political offices
Preceded by Li Yuanchao	Party Secretary of Jiangsu; 2007–2010	Succeeded by Luo Zhijun
Preceded by Yang Xiaotang	Party Secretary of Suzhou; 1998–2000	Succeeded by Chen Deming
