= Luo Zhijun =

Chinese politician (1951–2023)

- 罗志军
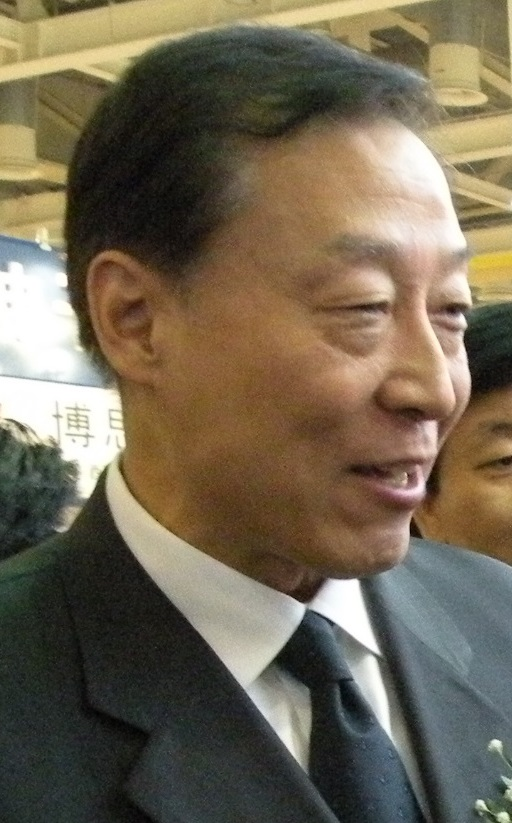
- Luo in 2008

Chairperson of the Agriculture and Rural Affairs Committee of the Chinese People's Political Consultative Conference
- In office 16 March 2018 – 13 March 2023
- Chairman: Wang Yang
- Preceded by: New title
- Succeeded by: Wang Jianjun

Chairman of Jiangsu People's Congress
- In office 14 February 2011 – 18 January 2017
- Preceded by: Liang Baohua
- Succeeded by: Li Qiang

Party Secretary of Jiangsu
- In office 6 December 2010 – 30 June 2016
- Deputy: Li Xueyong; Shi Taifeng (governor)
- Preceded by: Liang Baohua
- Succeeded by: Li Qiang

Governor of Jiangsu
- In office 4 January 2008 – 8 December 2010
- Preceded by: Liang Baohua
- Succeeded by: Li Xueyong

Personal details
- Born: 28 November 1951 Lingyuan, Liaoning, China
- Died: 1 April 2023 (aged 71)
- Party: Chinese Communist Party
- Education: China University of Political Science and Law

Military service
- Allegiance: People's Republic of China
- Branch/service: People's Liberation Army Navy
- Years of service: 1968–1978
- Unit: North Sea Fleet

Chinese name
- Simplified Chinese: 罗志军
- Traditional Chinese: 羅志軍
Transcriptions
Standard Mandarin
- Hanyu Pinyin: Luó Zhìjūn

Luo Zhijun (simplified Chinese: 罗志军; traditional Chinese: 羅志軍; pinyin: Luó Zhìjūn; 28 November 1951 – 1 April 2023) was a Chinese politician. He served as chair of the Chinese People's Political Consultative Conference Agriculture and Rural Affairs Committee from 16 March 2018 to 13 March 2023. He was vice-chairperson of the National People's Congress Environment Protection and Resources Conservation Committee from July 2016 to March 2018. He also served as Party Secretary and governor of Jiangsu. He died on 1 April 2023 at the age of 72.

== Biography ==
Luo was born in Lingyuan, Liaoning, the son of Luo Wen, a major general in the People's Liberation Army. Luo joined the army in February 1968 and became a soldier in PLA's North Sea Fleet. He joined the Chinese Communist Party in the next year. In September 1978 he moved to Beijing and became the secretary of Communist Youth League at Beijing Medical Radioactive Machine Factory. He entered China Youth Daily in 1980, and was later promoted to secretary general in that agency.

In September 1995, he was appointed vice mayor of Nanjing, and was elevated to mayor in 2002. He became the Nanjing municipal party chief in 2003. In December 2007, he was promoted to deputy party chief of Jiangsu. On 4 January 2008, he was elected as vice governor and acting governor of Jiangsu Province, and was duly confirmed as Governor by a session of the provincial People's Congress on 31 January 2008. Luo was named the Party Secretary of Jiangsu province in December 2010 following the retirement of Liang Baohua due to age. On 2 July 2016, Luo was appointed vice-chairperson of the National People's Congress Environment Protection and Resources Conservation Committee.

Luo was a member of the 18th Central Committee of the Chinese Communist Party and an alternate of the 17th Central Committee.

Luo finished his term as Chairperson of the Agriculture and Rural Affairs Committee of the Chinese People's Political Consultative Conference and succeeded by Wang Jianjun on 13 March 2023.

Luo died on 1 April 2023.

Government offices
Preceded by Wang Hongmin	Mayor of Nanjing; 2001–2003	Succeeded by Jiang Hongkun
Preceded by Liang Baohua	Governor of Jiangsu; 2008–2010	Succeeded by Li Xueyong
Party political offices
Preceded by Li Yuanchao	Party Secretary of Nanjing; 2003–2008	Succeeded by Zhu Shanlu
Preceded by Liang Baohua	Party Secretary of Jiangsu; 2010–2016	Succeeded by Li Qiang
Assembly seats
Preceded by Liang Baohua	Chairman of Jiangsu People's Congress; 2011–2017	Succeeded by Li Qiang
New title	Chairperson of the Agriculture and Rural Affairs Committee of the Chinese People's Political Consultative Conference; 2018–2023	Succeeded by Wang Jianjun
