= Officials implicated by the anti-corruption campaign in China (2022–present) =

The tables on this list includes only officials for which a case has been initiated by the Central Commission for Discipline Inspection of the Chinese Communist Party (CCP).

== List ==
Name	Position/Former Position	Announcement date	Status
Deputy National Level
Wei Fenghe	Former member of the Central Military Commission, former State Councilor and Minister of National Defense	June 27, 2024	Expelled from the Party, expelled from the military, the rank of general revoked, and transferred to the military procuratorate for examination and prosecution in accordance with the law.
Li Shangfu	Former member of the Central Military Commission, former State Councilor and Minister of National Defense	June 27, 2024	Expelled from the Party, expelled from the military, the rank of general revoked, and transferred to the military procuratorate for examination and prosecution in accordance with the law.
He Weidong	Vice Chairman of the Central Military Commission	October 17, 2025	Expelled from the Party, expelled from the military, the rank of general revoked, and transferred to the military procuratorate for examination and prosecution in accordance with the law.
Zhang Youxia	Vice Chairman of the Central Military Commission	January 24, 2026	Placed under investigation over suspected "serious violations of discipline."
Provincial and Ministerial Level
Liu Yazhou	Political Commissar of the PLA National Defence University	April 12, 2023	Expelled from the Party, removed from public office, sentenced to life imprisonment
Dong Yunhu	Secretary of the Party Leadership Group and Chairman of the Standing Committee of the Shanghai Municipal People's Congress	July 12, 2023	Expelled from the Party, removed from public office, sentenced to life imprisonment
Sun Zhigang	Former Vice Chairman of the Financial and Economic Committee of the National People's Congress, former Secretary of the Guizhou Provincial Committee of the Chinese Communist Party, and former Chairman of the Standing Committee of the Provincial People's Congress	August 28, 2023	Expelled from the Party, removed from public office, sentenced to death with a two-year reprieve.
Han Yong	Deputy Director of the Population, Resources and Environment Committee of the CPPCC National Committee, former chairman and Party Secretary of the Shaanxi Provincial CPPCC	October 19, 2023	Expelled from the Party, benefits cancelled, and transferred to judicial organs for review and prosecution in accordance with the law.
Li Yuchao	Commander of the People's Liberation Army Rocket Force	November 18, 2023	Currently undergoing disciplinary review and supervisory investigation.
Li Yuefeng	Executive Vice Chairman of the Taiwan Democratic Self-Government League Central Committee	March 23, 2024	Dismissed from public office and transferred to judicial organs for examination and prosecution in accordance with the law
Tang Yijun	Former Minister of Justice and former Governor of Liaoning Provincial People's Government	April 2, 2024	Expelled from the Party, removed from public office, and transferred to judicial organs for examination and prosecution in accordance with the law.
Tang Renjian	Secretary of the Party Leadership Group and Minister of the Ministry of Agriculture and Rural Affairs, former Governor of Gansu Provincial People's Government	May 18, 2024	Expelled from the Party, removed from public office, and transferred to judicial organs for examination and prosecution in accordance with the law.
Gou Zhongwen	Deputy Director of the National Committee of the Chinese People's Political Consultative Conference on Ethnic and Religious Affairs, former Director of the State Sports General Administration	May 30, 2024	Expelled from the Party, removed from public office, and transferred to judicial organs for examination and prosecution in accordance with the law.
Wu Yingjie	Chairman of the Culture, History and Learning Committee of the CPPCC National Committee and former Party Secretary of the Tibet Autonomous Region	June 16, 2024	Expelled from the Party, removed from public office, and transferred to judicial organs for examination and prosecution in accordance with the law.
Luo Baoming	Former Deputy Director of the Overseas Chinese Affairs Committee of the National People's Congress, former Secretary of the Hainan Provincial Committee of the Chinese Communist Party, and former Director of the Standing Committee of the Hainan Provincial People's Congress	July 25, 2024	Expelled from the Party, benefits cancelled, and transferred to judicial organs for review and prosecution in accordance with the law.
Li Weiwei	Deputy Director of the Population, Resources and Environment Committee of the National Committee of the Chinese People's Political Consultative Conference, former Party Secretary and Chairman of the Hunan Provincial Committee of the Chinese People's Political Consultative Conference	July 29, 2024	Expelled from the Party, removed from public office, and transferred to judicial organs for examination and prosecution in accordance with the law.
Qi Tongsheng	Former Party Secretary and Chairman of the Ningxia Hui Autonomous Region CPPC	October 8, 2024	Expelled from the Party, benefits cancelled, and transferred to judicial organs for review and prosecution in accordance with the law.
Miao Hua	Director of the Political Work Department of the Central Military Commission	November 5, 2024	Currently undergoing disciplinary review and supervisory investigation.
Wu Cunrong	Party Secretary and Chairman of the Shanxi Provincial Committee of the Chinese People's Political Consultative Conference	December 16, 2024	Currently undergoing disciplinary review and supervisory investigation.
Che Dalha	Deputy Director of the Agriculture and Rural Affairs Committee of the National Committee of the Chinese People's Political Consultative Conference, former Deputy Secretary of the Party Committee of the Tibet Autonomous Region and Chairman of the Regional Government	January 23, 2025	Currently undergoing disciplinary review and supervisory investigation.
Jiang Chaoliang	Vice Chairman of the Agriculture and Rural Affairs Committee of the National People's Congress, former Secretary of the Hubei Provincial Committee of the Chinese Communist Party, and former Chairman of the Standing Committee of the Provincial People's Congress	February 21, 2025	Currently undergoing disciplinary review and supervisory investigation.
Jin Xiangjun	Governor of Shanxi	April 12, 2025	Currently undergoing disciplinary review and supervisory investigation.
He Weidong	Vice Chairman of the Central Military Commission	April 16, 2025	Currently undergoing disciplinary review and supervisory investigation.
Lan Tianli	Chairman of Guangxi	May 16, 2025	Currently undergoing disciplinary review and supervisory investigation.
Bi Jingquan	Former Director of the China Food and Drug Administration	May 29, 2025	Currently undergoing disciplinary review and supervisory investigation.
Liu Jianchao	Head of the International Department of the Chinese Communist Party	July 28, 2025	Currently undergoing disciplinary review and supervisory investigation.
Wang Lixia	Chairwoman of the Inner Mongolia Autonomous Region	August 12, 2025	Currently undergoing disciplinary review and supervisory investigation.
Deputy-Provincial (Deputy-Ministerial) Level
Fan Yifei	Member of the Party Committee and Deputy Governor of the People's Bank of China	November 5, 2022	Expelled from the Party, removed from public office, sentenced to death with a two-year reprieve.
Fu Zhongwei	Chairman and Party Secretary of the Standing Committee of Shenyang Municipal People's Congress	November 9, 2022	Expelled from the Party, removed from public office, and sentenced to 15 years in prison.
Ji Guogang	Vice Chairman of the Standing Committee of the Tibet Autonomous Region People's Congress	November 16, 2022	Expelled from the Party, removed from public office, and sentenced to 13 years in prison.
Zhang Xiaopei	Former Vice Chairman of the Jilin Provincial CPPCC	November 25, 2022	Expelled from the Party, deprived of his benefits, sentenced to nine years in prison.
Zhou Jiankun	Vice Chairman and Deputy Secretary of the Party Leadership Group of the Guizhou Provincial Committee of the Chinese People's Political Consultative Conference	November 27, 2022	Expelled from the party, removed from public office, sentenced to life imprisonment.
Li Chunsheng	Deputy Director and Deputy Secretary of the Party Leadership Group of the Standing Committee of the Guangdong Provincial People's Congress	December 8, 2022	Expelled from the Party, removed from public office, and sentenced to ten years in prison.
Wang Xuefeng	Former Vice Chairman of the Standing Committee of Hebei Provincial People's Congress	January 6, 2023	Expelled from the party, deprived of his benefits, sentenced to 18 years in prison.
Ji Binchang	Chairman and Party Secretary of Qingdao CPPCC	January 6, 2023	Expelled from the Party, removed from public office, sentenced to death with a two-year reprieve.
Yi Pengfei	Member of the Party Leadership Group and former Vice Chairman of the Hunan Provincial Committee of the Chinese People's Political Consultative Conference	February 5, 2023	He was expelled from the Party, removed from public office, and sentenced to life imprisonment.
Hao Hongjun	Chairman and Party Secretary of Dalian CPPCC	February 5, 2023	Expelled from the Party, removed from public office, sentenced to life imprisonment.
Zheng Hong	Former Deputy Director and Deputy Secretary of the Party Group of the Standing Committee of the Chongqing Municipal People's Congress	March 16, 2023	Expelled from the Party, removed from public office, and transferred to judicial organs for examination and prosecution in accordance with the law.
Jiang Zhigang	Former Deputy Secretary of the CCP Ningxia Hui Autonomous Region Party Committee and Former Secretary of Yinchuan Municipal Party Committee	March 17, 2023	Expelled from the Party, removed from public office, and sentenced to 15 years in prison.
Cui Maohu	Former Deputy Minister of the United Front Work Department of the CCP Central Committee and former Director of the State Administration of Religious Affairs	March 18, 2023	Expelled from the Party, removed from public office, and sentenced to eleven years in prison.
Li Zaiyong	Member of the Party Leadership Group and former Vice Chairman of the Guizhou Provincial CPPCC	March 27, 2023	Expelled from the Party, removed from public office, sentenced to death with a two-year reprieve.
Sun Shutao	Member of the Party Leadership Group and Vice Chairman of the Shandong Provincial Committee of the Chinese People's Political Consultative Conference	March 28, 2023	Expelled from the Party, removed from public office, sentenced to life imprisonment.
Yin Meigen	Deputy Secretary and deputy director of the Party Leadership Group of the Standing Committee of the Jiangxi Provincial People's Congress	March 29, 2023	Expelled from the Party, removed from public office, and transferred to judicial organs for examination and prosecution in accordance with the law.
Liu Liange	Former Party Secretary and Chairman of Bank of China	March 31, 2023	Expelled from the Party, revoked of benefits, sentenced to death with a two-year reprieve.
Du Zhaocai	Member of the Party Leadership Group and deputy director of the State Sports General Administration	April 1, 2023	Expelled from the Party, removed from public office, and sentenced to 14 years in prison.
Li Xiaopeng	Former Party Secretary and Chairman of China Everbright Group Co., Ltd.	April 5, 2023	Expelled from the Party, removed from public office, and transferred to judicial organs for examination and prosecution in accordance with the law.
Liu Handong	Former member of the Party Leadership Group and deputy director of the Standing Committee of the Jiangsu Provincial People's Congress	April 16, 2023	Expelled from the Party, deprived of benefits, sentenced to death with a two-year reprieve.
Zhu Congjiu	Member of the Party Leadership Group and Vice Chairman of the Zhejiang Provincial CPPCC	May 4, 2023	Expelled from the Party, removed from public office, sentenced to life imprisonment.
Xiong Xue	Member of the Party Leadership Group of Chongqing Municipal Government, former Deputy Mayor	May 11, 2023	Expelled from the Party, revoked of benefits, sentenced to death with a two-year reprieve.
Luo Yulin	Former Deputy Minister-level Cadre of the State-owned Assets Supervision and Administration Commission of the State Council	May 17, 2023	Expelled from the Party, benefits cancelled, and transferred to judicial organs for examination and prosecution in accordance with the law.
Li Jinzhu	Former Vice Chairman of the Standing Committee of the Shaanxi Provincial People's Congress	May 29, 2023	Expelled from the Party, revoked of benefits, sentenced to death with a two-year reprieve.
Qu Min	Vice Chairman of the Heilongjiang Provincial Committee of the Chinese People's Political Consultative Conference	June 14, 2023	Expelled from the Party, removed from public office, and sentenced to 13 years in prison.
Jiang Jie	Member of the Party Leadership Group and Vice Chairman of the Tibet Autonomous Region CPPCC	July 3, 2023	Expelled from the Party, removed from public office, sentenced to death with a two-year reprieve.
Chen Jixing	Former member of the Party Leadership Group and deputy director of the Standing Committee of the Guangdong Provincial People's Congress	July 9, 2023	Expelled from the Party, removed from public office, sentenced to death with a two-year reprieve.
Tang Shuangning	Former Party Secretary and Chairman of China Everbright Group Co., Ltd.	July 15, 2023	Expelled from the Party, removed from public office, and sentenced to 12 years in prison.
Shang Liguang	Deputy Secretary of Shanxi Provincial Committee of the Chinese Communist Party	September 5, 2023	Expelled from the Party, removed from public office, sentenced to life imprisonment.
Li Haitao	Member of the Party Leadership Group and Vice Chairman of the Heilongjiang Provincial CPPCC	September 16, 2023	Expelled from the Party, removed from public office, and transferred to judicial organs for examination and prosecution in accordance with the law.
Zhang Xiulong	Former Deputy Secretary of the Party Leadership Group and deputy director of the Standing Committee of the People's Congress of Guangxi Zhuang Autonomous Region	October 21, 2023	Expelled from the Party, deprived of his benefits, sentenced to 13 years in prison.
Ling Chengxing	Former Party Secretary and Director of the State Tobacco Monopoly Administration	October 23, 2023	Expelled from the Party, benefits cancelled, and transferred to judicial organs for review and prosecution in accordance with the law.
Yang Kening	Former Deputy Secretary and Vice Chairman of the Sichuan Provincial Committee of the Chinese People's Political Consultative Conference	November 16, 2023	Expelled from the Party, removed from public office, and sentenced to 16 years in prison.
Wang Yixin	Member of the Standing Committee of the Heilongjiang Provincial Party Committee, Executive Vice Governor of Heilongjiang Provincial Government, and Deputy Secretary of the Party Leadership Group	December 8, 2023	Expelled from the Party, removed from public office, and transferred to judicial organs for examination and prosecution in accordance with the law.
Li Pengxin	Former Deputy Secretary of the Xinjiang Uyghur Autonomous Region Party Committee	December 11, 2023	Expelled from the Party, removed from public office, and transferred to judicial organs for examination and prosecution in accordance with the law.
Zhong Ziran	Former member of the Party Leadership Group of the Ministry of Natural Resources, former Party Secretary and Director of the China Geological Survey	January 2, 2024	Expelled from the Party, benefits cancelled, and transferred to judicial organs for review and prosecution in accordance with the law.
Peng Guofu	Member of the Party Leadership Group and Vice Chairman of the Standing Committee of the Hunan Provincial People's Congress	January 10, 2024	Expelled from the Party, removed from public office, and transferred to judicial organs for examination and prosecution in accordance with the law.
Su Zengtian	Former Deputy Secretary and deputy director of the Party Group of the Standing Committee of the Fujian Provincial People's Congress	January 21, 2024	Expelled from the Party, benefits cancelled, and transferred to judicial organs for review and prosecution in accordance with the law.
Dai Daojin	Former Deputy Secretary and Vice Chairman of the Hunan Provincial Committee of the Chinese People's Political Consultative Conference	January 26, 2024	Expelled from the Party, benefits cancelled, and transferred to judicial organs for review and prosecution in accordance with the law.
Wang Yong	Member of the Party Leadership Group and Vice Chairman of the Tibet Autonomous Region Government	January 29, 2024	Expelled from the Party, removed from public office, and transferred to judicial organs for examination and prosecution in accordance with the law.
Wang Yilin	Former Chairman of China National Petroleum Corporation	February 2, 2024	Expelled from the Party, benefits cancelled, and transferred to judicial organs for review and prosecution in accordance with the law.
Hu Qiang	Former Vice Chairman of Jiangxi Provincial CPPCC	February 21, 2024	Expelled from the Party, benefits cancelled, and transferred to judicial organs for review and prosecution in accordance with the law.
Zhang Zulin	Former member of the Party Leadership Group and Vice Governor of Yunnan Provincial People's Government	March 1, 2024	Expelled from the Party, benefits cancelled, and transferred to judicial organs for review and prosecution in accordance with the law.
Li Yong	Former Deputy Secretary of the Party Committee and General Manager of China National Offshore Oil Corporation	March 15, 2024	Expelled from the Party, benefits cancelled, and transferred to judicial organs for review and prosecution in accordance with the law.
Li Xiangang	Member of the Party Leadership Group and deputy director of the Standing Committee of the Heilongjiang Provincial People's Congress	March 17, 2024	Expelled from the Party, removed from public office, and transferred to judicial organs for examination and prosecution in accordance with the law.
Liu Yuejin	Member of the Foreign Affairs Committee of the 13th National Committee of the Chinese People's Political Consultative Conference, former Counter-Terrorism Commissioner of the Ministry of Public Security	March 18, 2024	Expelled from the Party, benefits cancelled, and transferred to judicial organs for review and prosecution in accordance with the law.
Dou Wangui	Member of the Party Leadership Group and Vice Chairman of the Xinjiang Uygur Autonomous Region CPPCC	March 20, 2024	Expelled from the Party, benefits cancelled, and transferred to judicial organs for review and prosecution in accordance with the law.
Chen Yan	Member of the Party Leadership Group and Vice Chairman of the Guizhou Provincial CPPCC	March 25, 2024	Expelled from the Party, removed from public office, and transferred to judicial organs for examination and prosecution in accordance with the law.
Du Zi	Former Deputy Secretary of the Party Group and deputy director of the Standing Committee of the Inner Mongolia Autonomous Region People's Congress	April 15, 2024	Expelled from the Party, benefits cancelled, and transferred to judicial organs for review and prosecution in accordance with the law.
Qin Rupei	Former member of the Standing Committee of the Guangxi Zhuang Autonomous Region Party Committee and former vice chairman of the Guangxi Zhuang Autonomous Region Government	April 16, 2024	Expelled from the Party, removed from public office, and transferred to judicial organs for examination and prosecution in accordance with the law.
Gao Peng	Member of the Beijing Municipal Government Party Leadership Group and Deputy Mayor	April 22, 2024	Expelled from the Party, removed from public office, and transferred to judicial organs for examination and prosecution in accordance with the law.
Liu Zhiqiang	Former member of the Party Leadership Group and Vice Minister of the Ministry of Justice	April 30, 2024	Expelled from the Party, benefits cancelled, and transferred to judicial organs for examination and prosecution in accordance with the law.
Wang Hao	Member of the Party Leadership Group and Vice Chairman of the Jiangsu Provincial Committee of the Chinese People's Political Consultative Conference	May 20, 2024	Expelled from the Party, removed from public office, and transferred to judicial organs for examination and prosecution in accordance with the law.
Liu Xingtai	Deputy Secretary and deputy director of the Party Leadership Group of the Standing Committee of the Hainan Provincial People's Congress	May 22, 2024	Expelled from the Party, removed from public office, and transferred to judicial organs for examination and prosecution in accordance with the law.
Wang Bo	Former Deputy Secretary of the Party Group and deputy director of the Standing Committee of the Inner Mongolia Autonomous Region People's Congress	June 3, 2024	Expelled from the Party, benefits cancelled, and transferred to judicial organs for review and prosecution in accordance with the law.
Yang Zixing	Former member of the Party Leadership Group and Vice Governor of Gansu Provincial Government	June 12, 2024	Expelled from the Party, benefits cancelled, and transferred to judicial organs for review and prosecution in accordance with the law.
Hong Lihe	Former Deputy Secretary and deputy director of the Party Group of the Standing Committee of the Jiangxi Provincial People's Congress	June 19, 2024	Currently undergoing disciplinary review and supervisory investigation.
Zhang Jianchun	Deputy Director of the Publicity Department of the CCP Central Committee	June 21, 2024	Expelled from the Party, removed from public office, and transferred to judicial organs for examination and prosecution in accordance with the law.
Li Shisong	Member of the Standing Committee of the Yunnan Provincial Party Committee, Executive Vice Governor of Yunnan Provincial Government, and Deputy Secretary of the Party Leadership Group	June 25, 2024	Expelled from the Party, removed from public office, and transferred to judicial organs for examination and prosecution in accordance with the law.
Cui Baohua	Former Deputy Secretary and Vice Chairman of the Sichuan Provincial Committee of the Chinese People's Political Consultative Conference	August 27, 2024	Expelled from the Party, benefits cancelled, and transferred to judicial organs for review and prosecution in accordance with the law.
Tan Ruisong	Former Party Secretary and Chairman of China Aviation Industry Corporation Limited	August 27, 2024	Expelled from the Party, benefits cancelled, and transferred to judicial organs for examination and prosecution in accordance with the law.
Du Yubo	Vice Chairman of the Education, Science, Culture and Health Committee of the 13th National People's Congress, former Deputy Secretary of the Party Committee and Vice Minister of the Ministry of Education	September 18, 2024	Expelled from the Party, benefits cancelled, and transferred to judicial organs for review and prosecution in accordance with the law.
Sun Yuning	Deputy Director General and Party Committee Member of the General Administration of Customs	September 24, 2024	Expelled from the Party, removed from public office, and transferred to judicial organs for examination and prosecution in accordance with the law.
Li Gang	Head of the Discipline Inspection and Supervision Group of the Central Commission for Discipline Inspection and the National Supervisory Commission stationed in the Central Organization Department	September 30, 2024	Expelled from the Party, removed from public office, and transferred to judicial organs for examination and prosecution in accordance with the law.
Yang Fasen	Member of the Standing Committee of the Qinghai Provincial Committee of the Chinese Communist Party and Secretary of the Political and Legal Affairs Commission	October 14, 2024	Expelled from the Party, removed from public office, and transferred to judicial organs for examination and prosecution in accordance with the law.
Liu Mancang	Former Deputy Secretary and deputy director of the Party Group of the Standing Committee of the Henan Provincial People's Congress	October 17, 2024	Expelled from the Party, benefits cancelled, and transferred to judicial organs for review and prosecution in accordance with the law.
Zhang Xiaolian	Deputy Director of the Economic Committee of the 13th CPPCC National Committee	October 21, 2024	Currently undergoing disciplinary review and supervisory investigation.
Zhao Jinyun	Vice Governor of Gansu Provincial Government	October 25, 2024	Currently under investigation by the National Supervisory Commission.
Lu Kehua	Member of the Standing Committee of the Chongqing Municipal Committee of the Chinese Communist Party and Secretary of the Political and Legal Affairs Commission	November 4, 2024	Currently undergoing disciplinary review and supervisory investigation.
Zhu Zhisong	Member of the Standing Committee of the Shanghai Municipal Committee, Secretary of the Pudong New Area Committee	November 27, 2024	Currently undergoing disciplinary review and supervisory investigation.
Luo Zengbin	Member of the Standing Committee of the Hainan Provincial Party Committee and Secretary of the Haikou Municipal Party Committee	December 6, 2024	Currently undergoing disciplinary review and supervisory investigation.
Ma Fengsheng	Member of the Party Leadership Group and Vice Chairman of the Qinghai Provincial CPPCC	December 11, 2024	Currently undergoing disciplinary review and supervisory investigation.
Kou Wei	Former Deputy Secretary of the Party Committee and General Manager of China Datang Corporation	December 21, 2024	Currently undergoing disciplinary review and supervisory investigation.
Zhou Jiabin	Member of the Party Leadership Group and Vice Chairman of the Standing Committee of the Guangxi Zhuang Autonomous Region People's Congress, Secretary of the Guilin Municipal Party Committee	December 28, 2024	Currently undergoing disciplinary review and supervisory investigation.
Zhou Xian	Member of the Party Leadership Group and Vice Chairman of the Anhui Provincial CPPCC	February 6, 2025	Currently undergoing disciplinary review and supervisory investigation.
Wang Zhonghe	Former Deputy Secretary and Vice Chairman of the Party Leadership Group of the Inner Mongolia Autonomous Region CPPCC	February 16, 2025	Currently undergoing disciplinary review and supervisory investigation.
Zhou Derui	Member of the Standing Committee of the CCP Tianjin Municipal Committee and Minister of the Organization Department	March 13, 2025	Currently undergoing disciplinary review and supervisory investigation.
Li Wenrong	Member of the Party Leadership Group and deputy director of the Standing Committee of the Yunnan Provincial People's Congress	March 18, 2025	Currently undergoing disciplinary review and supervisory investigation.
Wang Huimin	Former head of the Discipline Inspection and Supervision Group of the Central Commission for Discipline Inspection and the National Supervisory Commission stationed at the China Securities Regulatory Commission, and former member of the Party Committee of the China Securities Regulatory Commission	March 21, 2025	Currently undergoing disciplinary review and supervisory investigation.
Xu Xianping	Former member of the Party Leadership Group and deputy director of the National Development and Reform Commission, and former Counselor of the State Council	March 27, 2025	Currently undergoing disciplinary review and supervisory investigation.
Duan Chenggang	Member of the Party Leadership Group and Vice Chairman of Chongqing CPPCC	March 31, 2025	Under disciplinary review and supervisory investigation.
Long Xiang	Secretary of the Party Leadership Group and Chairman of the Standing Committee of Nanjing Municipal People's Congress	April 3, 2025	Under disciplinary review and supervisory investigation.
