= Liu Yuejin =

Former Chinese police officer and politician

- 刘跃进

Commissioner for Counterterrorism of the Ministry of Public Security
- In office December 2015 – June 2020
- Minister: Guo Shengkun; Zhao Kezhi
- Preceded by: New title
- Succeeded by: TBA

Director of the Office of the National Narcotics Control Committee
- In office May 2015 – 2020
- Preceded by: Li Wei
- Succeeded by: Xu Datong

Personal details
- Born: January 1959 (age 67) Ningyuan County, Hunan, China
- Party: Chinese Communist Party (1977–2024; expelled)
- Education: Southwest University of Political Science & Law
- Occupation: Politician, police officer

Chinese name
- Simplified Chinese: 刘跃进
- Traditional Chinese: 劉躍進
Transcriptions
Standard Mandarin
- Hanyu Pinyin: Liú Yuèjìn

Liu Yuejin (Chinese: 刘跃进; born January 1959) is a former Chinese police officer and politician. He was investigated by China's top anti-graft agency in March 2024. Previously he served as a commissioner for counterterrorism of the Ministry of Public Security and before that, assistant to the minister of public security and deputy director of the National Narcotics Control Committee.

He was a member of the 13th National Committee of the Chinese People's Political Consultative Conference.

== Early life and education ==
Liu was born in Ningyuan County, Hunan, in January 1959. During the Cultural Revolution, he worked in the Great River People's Commune in Guilin, Guangxi, and later an editor of the Guangxi People's Broadcasting Station. He graduated from the Criminal Investigation Department of Southwest University of Political Science & Law.

== Career ==
Liu joined the Chinese Communist Party (CCP) in September 1977. After university, he was despatched to the Tianjin Public Security Bureau, he served in several posts there, including officer of the Criminal Investigation Department, deputy director of the Political Department, deputy director of Hebei Branch, deputy director of Tanggu Branch, deputy director of the Criminal Investigation Department, director of the Criminal Investigation Department, and deputy director of the Tianjin Public Security Bureau. During his term in office as deputy director of the Anti Drug Bureau of the Ministry of Public Security, in October 2011, he led the special task force to investigate the Mekong River massacre, where 13 Chinese crew members aboard two cargo ships were killed by the "Naw Kham Group" in the border area between Myanmar and Thailand.

He was appointed assistant to the minister of public security in November 2014 and was admitted to member of the CCP Committee, the ministry's top authority. He concurrently served as deputy director of the National Narcotics Control Committee and head of its Office since May 2015. In December 2015, he was elevated to a commissioner for counterterrorism of the Ministry of Public Security, a position at vice-ministerial level. In 2019 as vice commissioner of the National Narcotics Control Commission he said: "We believe that the United States is the main cause of the problem of the abuse of fentanyl in the United States."

== Downfall ==
On 18 March 2024, Liu had been suspended for "suspected serious discipline violations" by the Central Commission for Discipline Inspection (CCDI), the party's internal disciplinary body, and the National Supervisory Commission, the highest anti-corruption agency of China. On September 11, he was stripped of his posts within the CCP. On September 24, he was detained by the Supreme People's Procuratorate.

On 27 March 2025, Liu stood trial at the Intermediate People's Court of Fuzhou on charges of taking bribes. The public prosecutors accused him of abusing his multiple positions between 1992 and 2020 to seek favor on behalf of certain organizations and individuals in enterprise operation and financing and borrowing, in return, he accepted money and property worth over 121 million yuan ($16.84 million). On June 23, he was sentenced to death with a two-year reprieve for bribery, and was deprived of political rights for life and all his properties were also confiscated, and all property gained from the bribery would be turned over to the national treasury.

Government offices
Preceded by Li Wei	Director of the Office of the National Narcotics Control Committee; 2015–2020	Succeeded by Xu Datong
New title	Commissioner for Counterterrorism of the Ministry of Public Security; 2015–2020	Succeeded by TBA
