= Liu Mancang =

Chinese politician

- 刘满仓

Vice Chairperson of Henan Provincial People's Congress
- In office January 2016 – January 2018
- Chairperson: Guo Gengmao; Xie Fuzhan

Personal details
- Born: October 1955 (age 70–71) Xixia County, Henan, China
- Party: Chinese Communist Party (1981-2025, expelled)
- Education: Xinxiang Normal College; Central Party School of the Chinese Communist Party

Chinese name
- Simplified Chinese: 刘满仓
- Traditional Chinese: 劉滿倉
Transcriptions
Standard Mandarin
- Hanyu Pinyin: Liú Mǎncāng

Liu Mancang (Chinese: 刘满仓; born October 1955) is a former Chinese politician who served as vice governor of Henan from 2008 to 2013 and vice chairperson of Henan Provincial People's Congress from 2016 to 2018. As of October 2024 he was under investigation by China's top anti-graft watchdog.

Liu was a representative of the 17th National Congress of the Chinese Communist Party. He was a delegate to the 10th National People's Congress.

== Early life and education ==
Liu was born in Xixia County, Henan, in October 1955. In 1978, he enrolled at Xinxiang Normal College, where he majored in mathematics. He joined the Chinese Communist Party (CCP) in June 1981.

== Career ==
After graduating in 1982, Liu became a grass-roots official. In March 1984, he was assigned to the Youth Cadre Department of the Organization Department of the CCP Henan Provincial Committee, ultimately being appointed director in June 1994.

Liu was appointed head of the Organization Department of the CCP Shangqiu Municipal Committee in March 1996 and was admitted to member of the CCP Shangqiu Municipal Committee, the city's top authority. He was named deputy party secretary of Shangqiu in May 1998. He became mayor in June 2001, and then party secretary, the top political position in the city, beginning in February 2003.

Liu rose to become vice governor of Henan in January 2008 and was admitted to member of the CCP Henan Provincial Committee, the province's top authority, in July 2012. He was secretary of the Political and Legal Affairs Commission of the CCP Henan Provincial Committee in February 2013, in addition to serving as vice chairperson of Henan Provincial People's Congress since January 2016.

== Downfall ==
On 17 October 2024, Liu was placed under investigation for "serious violations of laws and regulations" by the Central Commission for Discipline Inspection (CCDI), the party's internal disciplinary body, and the National Supervisory Commission, the highest anti-corruption agency of China. On 7 April 2025, he was expelled from the CCP.

On 30 June 2026, Liu was sentenced to life for taking bribery and bribery by taking advantage of influence at Suzhou Intermediate People's Court, Jiangsu.

Government offices
Preceded by Shi Peide	Mayor of Shangqiu; 2001–2003	Succeeded by Mao Fenglan
Party political offices
Preceded by Liu Xinmin	Communist Party Secretary of Shangqiu; 2003–2008	Succeeded by Tao Minglun
Preceded by Mao Chaofeng	Secretary of the Political and Legal Affairs Commission of the 省 Provincial Committee of the Chinese Communist Party; 2013–2016	Succeeded by Wu Tianjun
