= Shandong Provincial Committee of the Chinese People's Political Consultative Conference =

Shandong Provincial Committee of the Chinese People's Political Consultative Conference 中国人民政治协商会议山东省委员会
- 13th
- Emblem of the Chinese People's Political Consultative Conference

Type
- Type: United front organ Constitutional convention (Historical); Legislature (Historical) of Chinese People's Political Consultative Conference

History
- Founded: January 1955; 71 years ago
- Preceded by: Shandong Provincial People's Congress Consultative Committee

Leadership
- Chairperson: Ge Huijun

Website
- www.sdzx.gov.cn

Chinese name
- Simplified Chinese: 中国人民政治协商会议山东省委员会
- Traditional Chinese: 中國人民政治協商會議山東省委員會
Transcriptions
Standard Mandarin
- Hanyu Pinyin: Zhōngguó Rénmín Zhèngzhì Xiéshāng Huìyì Shāndōngshěng Wěiyuánhuì

Abbreviation
- Simplified Chinese: 山东省政协
- Traditional Chinese: 山东省政協
- Literal meaning: CPPCC Shandong Provincial Committee
Transcriptions
Standard Mandarin
- Hanyu Pinyin: Shāndōngshěng Zhèngxié

The Shandong Provincial Committee of the Chinese People's Political Consultative Conference (Chinese: 中国人民政治协商会议山东省委员会; abbreviation CPPCC Shandong Provincial Committee) is the provincial advisory body and a local organization of the Chinese People's Political Consultative Conference in Shandong, China. It is supervised and directed by the Shandong Provincial Committee of the Chinese Communist Party.

== History ==
The Shandong Provincial Committee of the Chinese People's Political Consultative Conference traces its origins to the Shandong Provincial People's Congress Consultative Committee (山东省各界人民代表会议协商委员会) and Pingyuan Provincial People's Congress Consultative Committee (平原省各界人民代表会议协商委员会) , founded in March 1950 and January 1951, respectively.

At the end of 1952, Pingyuan province was dissolved, and the three districts of Heze, Liaocheng, and Huxi were incorporated into Shandong province. As part of this transition, several members of the Pingyuan Provincial People's Congress Consultative Committee joined the Shandong Provincial People's Congress Consultative Committee.

In accordance with the Constitution of the People's Republic of China and the Charter of the Chinese People's Political Consultative Conference (CPPCC), the 1st Plenary Session of the 1st Shandong Provincial Committee of the Chinese People's Political Consultative Conference was held in Jinan from January 7 to 11, 1955. This session inaugurated the official establishment of the Shandong Provincial Committee of the Chinese People's Political Consultative Conference, commonly known as the CPPCC Shandong Provincial Committee.

However, in 1966, the Shandong Provincial Committee of the Chinese People's Political Consultative Conference, along with its municipal and county committees, was forced to suspend all operations due to the political turmoil of the Cultural Revolution. A significant revitalization occurred when the 1st Session of the 4th Shandong Provincial Committee of the Chinese People's Political Consultative Conference convened in Jinan from December 6 to 15, 1977, marking the formal restoration of the Shandong Provincial Committee of the Chinese People's Political Consultative Conference organization.

=== Anti-corruption campaign ===
On 17 December 2009, Sun Shuyi was removed from the position of chairperson due to suspected of participating in illegal fundraising of 4 billion yuan.

On 28 March 2023, vice chairperson Sun Shutao was put under investigation for alleged "serious violations of discipline and laws" by the Central Commission for Discipline Inspection (CCDI), the party's internal disciplinary body, and the National Supervisory Commission, the highest anti-corruption agency of China.

On 5 June 2024, he was sentenced to life imprisonment for bribery by the Intermediate People's Court in Datong of Shandong.

== Term ==
=== 1st ===
- Term: January 1955–May 1959
- Chairperson: Tan Qilong
- Vice Chairpersons: Chao Zhefu, Ma Baosan, Miao Hainan (January 1955–April 1957), Wang Shenlin, Zhang Boqiu, Zhao Dusheng (April 1956–May 1959), Fan Yushu (April 1956–March 1958), Wang Zhuchen (April 1956–May 1959), Zhou Zhijun

Secretary-General: Zhao Dusheng (January 1955–April 1956) → Xie Fang

=== 2nd ===
- Term: May 1959–December 1963
- Chairperson: Tan Qilong
- Vice Chairpersons: Chao Zhefu, Ma Baosan, Liu Zhongyi, Liu Minsheng, Li Chengzhi, Chen Meichuan, Zhang Boqiu, Shao Defu, Miao Hainan, Zhang Xi, Ding Lüde, Wang Linken (May 1959–June 1960), Zhou Zhijun (May 1959–December 1960), Wang Zhuchen
- Secretary-General: Fan Xingke (May 1959–December 1960)

=== 3rd ===
- Term: December 1963–May 1966
- Chairperson: Tan Qilong
- Vice Chairpersons: Chao Zhefu, Zhang Ye, Ma Baosan (December 1963–February 1964), Cheng Fangwu, Liu Zhongyi, Liu Minsheng, Li Chengzhi, Shao Defu, Wang Zhe, Feng Ping, Zhang Boqiu (December 1963–May 1965), Miao Hainan, Ding Lüde, Zhou Zhijun, Wang Zhuchen, Huo Weide (December 1965–May 1966)
- Secretary-General: Liu Naidian

=== 4th ===
- Term: December 1977–April 1983
- Chairperson: Bai Rubing → (December 1977–June 1979) → Zhao Lin (June 1979–November 1979) → Gao Keting (December 1979–April 1983)
- Vice Chairpersons: Yang Guofu (– February 1982), Wang Zhongyin (– December 1979), Li Zichao (– December 1979), Wang Zhe, Zhang Ye (– December 1979), Liu Minsheng (– January 1978), Chen Lei (– December 1979), Zhang Zhusheng (– December 1979), Feng Ping, Xu Meisheng, Yang Jieren (– December 1979), Zeng Chengkui (– December 1979), Liu Xianzhi (– December 1979), Guo Yicheng, Zhou Zhijun (– December 1979), Li Sijing, Zhang Weicen, Zhou Xingfu (December 1979–), Yu Xiu (December 1979–), Li Lin (December 1979–), Tian Haishan (December 1979–), Bai Yanbo (December 1979–), Wang Liang (December 1979 –), Jiang Guodong (December 1979–), Fan Yushu (December 1979–), Fang Zongxi (December 1979–), Du Ruilan (December 1981–February 1982)
- Secretary-General: Zhao Fangzhou

=== 5th ===
- Term: April 1983–February 1988
- Chairperson: Li Zichao
- Vice Chairpersons: Zhou Xingfu, Yu Xiu (April 1983–December 1984), Liu Xianzhi, Xu Meisheng, Guo Yicheng, Li Sijing (April 1983–March 1985), Zhang Weicen, Tian Haishan (April 1983–March 1985), Wang Liang (April 1983–March 1985), Fan Yushu (April 1983–October 1983), Fang Zongxi (April 1983–July 1985), Xu Wenyuan, Kong Lingren, Cai Qiangkang, Ding Fangming
- Secretary-General: Xu Pengxian

=== 6th ===
- Term: February 1988–1993
- Chairperson: Li Zichao
- Vice Chairpersons: Zhou Zhenxing, Xu Wenyuan, Kong Lingren, Ding Fangming, Zheng Weimin, Jin Baozhen, Yang Da, Zheng Shouyi, Wu Fuheng, Wu Minggang, Wang Zunong, Su Yingheng, Miao Yongming, Lu Maozeng (March 1989–), Zhai Yongbo (March 1992–), Tian Jian (March 1992–)

=== 7th ===
- Term: April 1993–April 1998
- Chairperson: Lu Maozeng
- Vice Chairpersons: Zhai Yongbo, Tian Jian, Kong Lingren, Zheng Shouyi, Wang Yuyan, Cui Weilin, Wu Fuheng, Wu Minggang, Wang Zunong, Su Yingheng, Miao Yongming, Li Gongjiu, Liu Hongren (added), Li Diankui (added)

=== 8th ===
- Term: April 1998–April 2003
- Chairperson: Han Xikai → Wu Aiying (March 2002–)
- Vice Chairpersons: Cui Weilin, Miao Yongming, Liu Hongren, Li Diankui, Wang Jiuhu, Guan Huashi, Zhou Hongxing, Zhu Ming, Zhang Min, Pan Guangtian, Wang Xia, Lin Shuxiang (March 2002–), Liu Bainian (March 2002–), Shi Lijun (March 2002–)

=== 9th ===
- Term: January 2003–January 2008
- Chairperson: Wu Aiying → Sun Shuyi (January 2004 –)
- Vice Chairpersons: Wang Jiuhu, Lin Shuxiang (–February 2007), Zhou Hongxing, Zhu Ming, Zhang Min, Qiao Yanchun, Wang Zonglian, Qi Naigui, Miao Shuju, Wang Zhimin, Wang Xiuzhi (January 2005–), Xie Yutang (January 2006–)

Secretary-General: Yuan Yifa → Bi Sisheng (January 2006–)

=== 10th ===
- Term: January 2008–January 2013
- Chairperson: Sun Shuyi → Liu Wei
- Vice Chairpersons: Qiao Yanchun (January 2008–February 2012), Qi Naigui (January 2008–February 2012), Yan Rongzhu (February 2012–January 2013), Wang Zhimin, Zhao Yulan, Zhang Chuanlin, Li Deqiang, Li Jia, Wang Xinlu, Wang Naijing, Chen Guang (February 2012–January 2013)
- Secretary-General: Bi Sisheng → Zhang Xinji (February 2012–January 2013)

=== 11th ===
- Term: January 2013–January 2018
- Chairperson: Liu Wei
- Vice Chairpersons: Yan Rongzhu (January 2013–January 2016), Zhang Chuanlin (January 2013–January 2016), Li Jia (January 2013–January 2016), Wang Xinlu (January 2013–January 2016), Lei Jianguo (January 2015–January 2018), Wang Naijing, Chen Guang, Xu Liquan, Guo Ailing, Sun Jiye, Zhai Luning (January 2016–January 2018), Zhao Jiajun (January 2016–January 2018)
- Secretary-General: Zhang Xinji

=== 12th ===
- Term: January 2018–January 2023
- Chairperson: Fu Zhifang (–January 2022) → Ge Huijun (January 2022–)
- Vice Chairpersons: Wu Cuiyun (–January 2022), Guo Ailing (–February 2021), Zhao Jiajun, Tang Zhouyan, Wang Yihua, Han Jinfeng, Wang Xiulin, Cheng Lin, Liu Jungang, Yu Guo'an (February 2021–), Duan Qingying (February 2021–), Wang Shujian (January 2022–), Lin Fenghai (January 2022–)

Secretary-General: Wang Yihua (January 2018–February 2019) → Liu Yongju (February 2019–January 2022) → Bian Xianghui (January 2022–)

=== 13th ===
- Term: January 2023–2028
- Chairperson: Ge Huijun
- Vice Chairpersons: Wang Shujian, Lin Fenghai, Sun Jiye, Wang Xiulin, Cheng Lin (–March 2023), Liu Jungang, Sun Shutao (–May 2023), Duan Qingying, Zhang Xinwen
- Secretary-General: Qin Chuanbin
