= Hong Lihe =

Chinese politician

- 洪礼和

Vice Chairperson of the Jiangxi Provincial People's Congress
- In office January 2013 – January 2017
- Chairperson: Su Rong; Qiang Wei

Vice Governor of Jiangxi
- In office January 2007 – January 2013
- Governor: Wu Xinxiong; Lu Xinshe

Personal details
- Born: November 1953 (age 72) Yugan County, Jiangxi, China
- Party: Chinese Communist Party (expelled in 2025)
- Education: Jiangxi University

Chinese name
- Simplified Chinese: 洪礼和
- Traditional Chinese: 洪禮和
Transcriptions
Standard Mandarin
- Hanyu Pinyin: Hóng Lǐhé

Hong Lihe (Chinese: 洪礼和; born November 1953) is a retired Chinese politician who spent his entire career in his home-province Jiangxi. He was investigated by China's top anti-graft agency in June 2024. He has been retired for 7 years. Previously he served as vice chairperson of the Jiangxi Provincial People's Congress and before that, vice governor of Jiangxi. He was a representative of the 16th National Congress of the Chinese Communist Party. He was a delegate to the 10th National People's Congress.

== Early life and education ==
Hong was born in Yugan County, Jiangxi, in November 1953. He was a sent-down youth in his home-county between June 1971 and January 1973. In January 1973, he enlisted in the People's Liberation Army (PLA), doing service in the 62nd Regiment of the 13th Division of the People's Liberation Army Railway Corps. After finishing his military service in May 1977, he worked at Jiangxi Vinylon Factory. After his college entrance examination in 1978, he enrolled at Jiangxi University, where he majored in Chinese language and literature.

== Career ==
Starting in January 1982, Hong served in several posts in the General Office of the Jiangxi Provincial People's Government, including secretary of the Economic Research Office, deputy director of the Economic Research Office, director of the Research Department, and deputy director of the Office. He also served as deputy secretary-general of the government from May 1995 to December 1999.

Hong served as mayor of Xinyu from December 1999 to December 2001, and party secretary, the top political position in the city, from December 2001 to January 2003.

Hong became director of Jiangxi Provincial Development and Reform Commission in January 2003, and served until January 2007, when he elevated to vice governor of the province.

In January 2013, Hong took office as vice chairperson of the Jiangxi Provincial People's Congress, the province's top legislative body.

=== Downfall ===
On 19 June 2024, Hong was suspected of "serious violations of laws and regulations" by the Central Commission for Discipline Inspection (CCDI), the party's internal disciplinary body, and the National Supervisory Commission, the highest anti-corruption agency of China.

On 6 June 2025, Hong was expelled from the CCP.

On 28 April 2026, Hong was sentenced to 20 years for bribery, abuse power and money laundering in Fuzhou People's Intermediate Court.

Government offices
Preceded by Wang Teng (王腾)	Director of the Office of Jiangxi Provincial People's Government; 1995–1999	Succeeded by Zhu Zhangcai
Preceded by Cao Erli (曹二俚)	Mayor of Xinyu; 1999–2001	Succeeded by Jin Xi'an (金细安)
Preceded by Sun Gang (孙刚)	Director of Jiangxi Provincial Development and Reform Commission; 2003–2007	Succeeded by Yao Mugen
Party political offices
Preceded by Pan Yiyang	Communist Party Secretary of Xinyu; 2001–2003	Succeeded by Zhong Ligui
