= Zhao Jinyun =

Chinese politician

- 赵金云
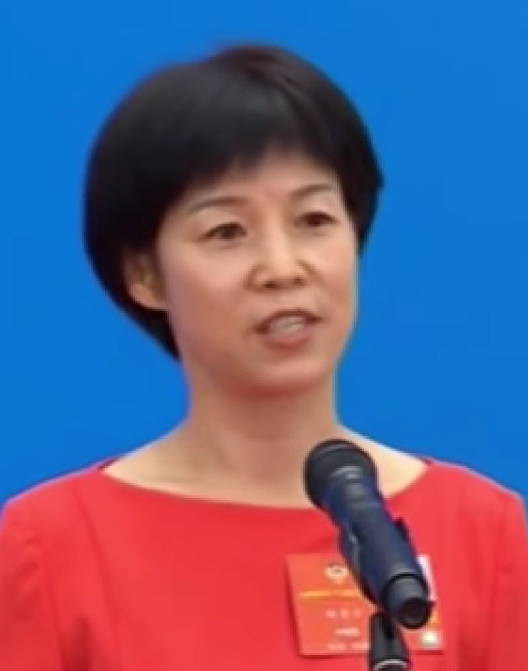
- Zhao in 2020

Vice Governor of Gansu
- In office 12 December 2022 – 25 October 2024
- Governor: Ren Zhenhe

Personal details
- Born: October 1965 (age 60–61) Minqin County, Gansu, China
- Party: Jiusan Society
- Education: Northwest Normal University

Chinese name
- Simplified Chinese: 赵金云
- Traditional Chinese: 趙金雲
Transcriptions
Standard Mandarin
- Hanyu Pinyin: Zhào Jīnyún

Zhao Jinyun (Chinese: 赵金云; born October 1965) is a former Chinese politician who spent her entire career in her home-province Gansu. As of October 2024 she was under investigation by China's top anti-graft watchdog. Previously she served as vice governor of Gansu.

Zhao was a member of the 13th and 14th National Committee of the Chinese People's Political Consultative Conference.

== Early life and education ==
Zhao was born in Minqin County, Gansu, in October 1965. She enrolled at Northwest Normal University where she received her bachelor's degree in 1987 and his master's degree in 1990 both in geography.

== Career ==
After University in 1990, Zhao was assigned to the Gansu Provincial Land Management Bureau (now Gansu Provincial Land and Resources Department). She worked in the department for 21 years, ultimately being appointed director of Land Use Management Office. She joined the Jiusan Society in April 1999.

In October 2011, Zhao was made deputy general manager of Gansu Highway Aviation Tourism Investment Group Co., Ltd., vice chairwoman of Gansu Highway Investment Management Co., Ltd., and chairwoman of Gansu Airport Operation Management Co., Ltd.

Zhao was supervisory board chairwoman of Gansu Civil Aviation Airport Group Co., Ltd. in September 2015, in addition to serving as a member of the Gansu Provincial Committee of the Jiusan Society.

Zhao was chosen as general manager of Reader Publishing Group Co., Ltd. in June 2018, concurrently serving as general manager, chief editor and vice chairwoman of Reader Publishing Media Co., Ltd.

On 12 December 2022, Zhao took office as vice governor of Gansu.

== Downfall ==
On 25 October 2024, Zhao was placed under investigation for "serious violations of laws and regulations" by the National Supervisory Commission, the highest anti-corruption agency of China.

On 23 April 2025, Zhao was dismissed from public office. On May 9, she was detained by the Supreme People's Procuratorate. On July 30, 2025, she was indicted on suspicion of accepting bribes.

On 6 January 2026, Zhao was sentenced to 15 years and fined 3.5 million yuan for bribery and insider trading.

Media offices
| Preceded by Ji Xiping | General Manager of Reader Publishing Group Co., Ltd. 2018–2022 | Succeeded by Ma Yongqiang |
