= Zhong Ziran =

Chinese politician

- 钟自然

President of the Chinese Academy of Geological Sciences
- In office March 2017 – September 2022
- Preceded by: Meng Xianlai
- Succeeded by: Li Jinfa

Director of the China Geological Survey
- In office July 2014 – September 2022
- Preceded by: Wang Min
- Succeeded by: Li Jinfa

Personal details
- Born: August 1962 (age 64) Tongcheng, Anhui, China
- Party: Chinese Communist Party (1985–2024; expelled)
- Education: Hefei University of Technology; Central Party School of the Chinese Communist Party

Chinese name
- Simplified Chinese: 钟自然
- Traditional Chinese: 鐘自然
Transcriptions
Standard Mandarin
- Hanyu Pinyin: Zhōng Zìrán

Zhong Ziran (Chinese: 钟自然; born August 1962) is a former Chinese politician. As of January 2024 he was under investigation by China's top anti-corruption agency. Previously he served as president of the Chinese Academy of Geological Sciences. He is the first senior official to be targeted by China's top anticorruption watchdog in 2024. He was a representative of the 19th National Congress of the Chinese Communist Party.

== Early life and education ==
Zhong was born in Tongcheng, Anhui, in August 1962. After resuming the college entrance examination, in 1979, he enrolled at Hefei University of Technology, where he majored in mineral resource prospecting and exploration.

== Career ==
After graduating in 1983, he became an official of the Chemical Mine Planning and Design Institute of the Ministry of Chemical Industry. He joined the Chinese Communist Party (CCP) in April 1985. Between 1985 and 1991, he received his master's degree and doctor's degree both in mineralogy from the Chinese Academy of Geological Sciences.

Starting in September 1991, he served in several posts in the Mineral Development Management Bureau of the Ministry of Geology and Mineral Resources, including principal staff member, deputy director of the Legal Division, director of the Legal Division, and eventually deputy director of the bureau.

After a short time as deputy director of the Oil and Gas Resources Management Office of the National Mineral Resources Commission in 1997, he was transferred to the Ministry of Land and Resources in July 1998. He was director of Geological Exploration Department, in addition to serving as president of China Geological Environment Monitoring Institute.

He became deputy director of the China Geological Survey in March 2007, rising to director in July 2014. He also served as president of the Chinese Academy of Geological Sciences since March 2017.

== Downfall ==
On 2 January 2024, Zhong had been suspended for "suspected serious discipline violations" by the Central Commission for Discipline Inspection (CCDI), the party's internal disciplinary body, and the National Supervisory Commission, the highest anti-corruption agency of China.

In June 2024, Zhong was expelled from the Party and his entitlements were canceled. On July 9, the Supreme People's Procuratorate made a decision to arrest Zhong Nature on suspicion of accepting bribes and intentionally leaking state secrets. On October 25, he was indicted on suspicion of accepting bribes.

On 17 January 2025, Zhong stood trial for bribery at the Intermediate People's Court of Ningbo. Prosecutors accused him of taking advantage of his different positions between 2011 and 2023 to seek profits for various companies and individuals, in return for bribes paid in cash or gifts worth over 23.56 million yuan ($3.28 million). On April 16, he received a sentence of 13 years in prison and fine of two million yuan for corruption, and all property gained from the bribery would be turned over to the national treasury.

Government offices
Preceded by Zhong Zhiwei (仲伟志)	Director of the Geological Exploration Department of the Ministry of Land and Resources; 2005–2007	Succeeded by Liu Lianhe (刘连和)
Preceded by Wang Min	Director of the China Geological Survey; 2014–2022	Succeeded by Li Jinfa
Academic offices
Preceded by Meng Xianlai	President of the Chinese Academy of Geological Sciences; 2017–2022	Succeeded by TBA
Civic offices
Preceded by Xu Shaoshi	President of the Geological Society of China; 2016–2023	Succeeded by TBA
