= Yang Zixing =

Chinese politician

- 杨子兴

Vice Governor of Gansu
- In office June 2015 – January 2018
- Governor: Liu Weiping; Lin Duo

Personal details
- Born: October 1959 (age 66–67) Gulang County, Gansu, China
- Party: Chinese Communist Party (1984–2024; expelled)
- Education: Northwest Normal University; Lanzhou University; Peking University

Chinese name
- Simplified Chinese: 杨子兴
- Traditional Chinese: 楊子興
Transcriptions
Standard Mandarin
- Hanyu Pinyin: Yáng Zǐxīng

Yang Zixing (Chinese: 杨子兴; born October 1959) is a retired Chinese politician who spent his entire career in northeast China's Gansu province. As of June 2024 he was under investigation by China's top anti-graft watchdog. He has been retired for 6 years. Previously he served as vice governor of Gansu.

== Early life and education ==
Yang was born in Gulang County, Gansu, in October 1959. Upon the end of the Cultural Revolution in 1976, he became a sent-down youth in Wuwei. After resuming the college entrance examination, in 1978, he entered Northwest Normal University, where he majored in Chinese language and literature. From 1997 to 1999, he did his postgraduate work at Lanzhou University. He also earned his master's degree in public administration in 2008.

== Career ==
After university in 1982, Yang was despatched to Gansu Provincial Forestry Department. He joined the Chinese Communist Party (CCP) in August 1984.

In December 1989, Yang became deputy director of the Office of Gansu Provincial Poverty Alleviation Office, rising to director in March 1993.

In May 2000, Yang was admitted to member of the CCP Longnan Municipal Committee, the city's top authority. He was also vice mayor in September 2000 and subsequently deputy party secretary in December 2004.

In April 2005, Yang was named acting mayor of Dingxi, confirmed in July of the same year. He was party secretary, the top political position in the city, in February 2008, concurrently serving as chairperson of the People's Congress.

He was chosen as executive deputy head of the Organization Department of the CCP Gansu Provincial Committee in November 2013 and subsequently vice governor of Gansu in June 2015. He retired in January 2018.

== Downfall ==
On 20 July 2017, Yang was given a warning as a measure of party discipline for the ecological environment destruction in Qilian Mountains.

On 12 June 2024, Yang was suspected of "serious violations of laws and regulations" by the Central Commission for Discipline Inspection (CCDI), the party's internal disciplinary body, and the National Supervisory Commission, the highest anti-corruption agency of China. On December 12, he was expelled from the CCP. On December 27, the Supreme People's Procuratorate signed an arrest order for him for taking bribes.

On 6 May 2025, Yang was indicted on suspicion of accepting bribes. On October 31, he was sentenced to 14 years in prison and fined 5 million yuan ($700,000) for accepting bribes and abusing his influence for personal gain, and received a 4-million-yuan fine for bribery, all property gained from the bribery would be turned over to the national treasury.

Government offices
Preceded by Wu Wenbin	Mayor of Dingxi; 2005–2008	Succeeded by Xu Erfeng
Party political offices
Preceded by Shi Jing	Communist Party Secretary of Dingxi; 2008–2013	Succeeded by Zhang Lingping
