= Li Haitao (politician) =

Chinese politician

- 李海涛

Vice Chairman of the Heilongjiang Provincial Committee of the Chinese People's Political Consultative Conference
- In office January 2022 – September 2023
- Chairman: Lan Shaomin

Personal details
- Born: September 1963 (age 63) Bayan County, Heilongjiang, China
- Party: Chinese Communist Party (1989–2024; expelled)
- Education: Heilongjiang Bayi Agricultural University; Harbin Institute of Technology

Chinese name
- Simplified Chinese: 李海涛
- Traditional Chinese: 李海濤
Transcriptions
Standard Mandarin
- Hanyu Pinyin: Lǐ Hǎitāo

Li Haitao (Chinese: 李海涛; born September 1963) is a Chinese former politician who spent most of his career in northeast China's Heilongjiang province. As of September 2023 he was under investigation by China's top anti-corruption agency. Previously he served as vice chairman of the Heilongjiang Provincial Committee of the Chinese People's Political Consultative Conference.

Li is a delegate to the 13th National People's Congress.

== Early life ==
Li was born in Bayan County, Heilongjiang, in September 1963.

== Career ==
After graduating from Heilongjiang Bayi Agricultural University in 1980, he was dispatched to the Heilongjiang Provincial Planning Commission (later was reshuffled as Heilongjiang Provincial Economic Commission). There, he was in turn a deputy chief staff member, a chief staff member, a deputy director of the Office, and finally deputy director of the commission. He joined the Chinese Communist Party (CCP) in February 1989.

In October 2004, he was appointed mayor and deputy party secretary of Jiamusi, he remained in that position until February 2010, when he was transferred to Daxing'anling Prefecture and appointed party secretary.

He was appointed secretary-general of the Heilongjiang Provincial People's Government in April 2011, secretary-general of the CCP Heilongjiang Provincial Committee in December 2013, and three years later was admitted to member of the CCP Heilongjiang Provincial Committee, the province's top authority. He rose to become vice governor of Heilongjiang in April 2016.

He was made vice chairman of the Heilongjiang Provincial Committee of the Chinese People's Political Consultative Conference in January 2022.

== Downfall ==
On 16 September 2023, he had been suspended for "suspected serious discipline violations" by the Central Commission for Discipline Inspection (CCDI), the party's internal disciplinary body, and the National Supervisory Commission, the highest anti-corruption agency of China.

On 12 September 2024, he was expelled from the CCP and dismissed from public office. On September 29, he was arrested by the Supreme People's Procuratorate.

On 21 January 2025, Li was indicted on suspicion of accepting bribes.

On 17 March 2026, Li was sentenced to life for taking bribes worth 150 million yuan.

Government offices
| Preceded by Deng Hua | Mayor of Jiamusi; 2004–2010 | Succeeded by Sun Zhe |
| Preceded by Guo Xiaohua | Secretary-General of the Heilongjiang Provincial People's Government; 2011–2013 | Succeeded by Li Xiangang |
| Preceded by Hao Huilong | Executive Vice Governor of Heilongjiang; 2017–2022 | Succeeded by Shen Ying |
Party political offices
| Preceded by Song Xibin | Communist Party Secretary of Daxing'anling Prefecture; 2010–2011 | Succeeded by Xiao Jianchun |
| Preceded by Yang Dongqi | Secretary-General of the Heilongjiang Provincial Committee of the Chinese Communist Party; 2013–2016 | Succeeded by Zhang Yupu |
