= Wu Tianjun =

Chinese politician

- 吴天君

Communist Party Secretary of the Political and Legal Affairs Commission of Henan
- In office May 2016 – November 2016
- Preceded by: Liu Mancang (刘满仓)
- Succeeded by: Vacant
- In office December 2011 – February 2012
- Preceded by: Li Xinmin (李新民)
- Succeeded by: Mao Chaofeng

Communist Party Secretary of Zhengzhou
- In office February 2012 – May 2016
- Preceded by: Lian Weiliang (连维良)
- Succeeded by: Ma Yi (马懿)

Mayor of Zhengzhou
- In office May 2011 – December 2011
- Preceded by: Zhao Jiancai (赵建才)
- Succeeded by: Ma Yi (马懿)

Personal details
- Born: February 1957 (age 69) Puyang County, Henan
- Party: Chinese Communist Party (1982–2017, expelled)
- Education: Anyang Agriculture University; China University of Geosciences

Wu Tianjun (simplified Chinese: 吴天君; traditional Chinese: 吳天君; pinyin: Wú Tīanjūn; born February 1957) is a former Chinese politician, and the Chinese Communist Party Secretary of the Political and Legal Affairs Commission of Henan. He was dismissed from his position in November 2016 for investigation by the Central Commission for Discipline Inspection.

== Career ==
Wu Tianjun was born in Puyang County, Henan in February 1957, and he was entered to Anyang Agriculture University in 1977 and graduated in 1978. He joined the Chinese Communist Party (CCP) in 1982. Then he became Deputy County Magistrate of Qi County (淇县) in 1984. From 1987 to 1989, he served as CCP Deputy Committee Secretary of Neihuang County, and upgraded to Secretary in 1991. In 1994, he became the Deputy Mayor of Anyang, and transferred to Xinxiang in 2000. Wu served as Deputy Secretary, Mayor, and Secretary until 2011.

In May 2011, Wu was appointed as the CCP Deputy Committee Secretary and Mayor of Zhengzhou. He was appointed as CCP Secretary of the Political and Legal Affairs Commission of Henan in the first time in December 2011. In February 2012, he was appointed as the CCP Secretary of Zhengzhou. Wu was appointed as CCP Secretary of the Political and Legal Affairs Commission of Henan again in May 2016. He has not served as Member of CCP Provincial Standing Committee of Henan since October 2016.

== Investigation ==
On November 11, 2016, Wu Tianjun was placed under investigation by the Central Commission for Discipline Inspection, the CCP's internal disciplinary body, for "serious violations of regulations". Wu was expelled from the CCP on January 23, 2017. On August 4, 2017, Wu was sentenced to 11 years in prison for taking bribes worth 11.05 million yuan in Xiangyang.
