= Wang Zhonghe =

Chinese politician

- 王中和

Vice Chairman of the Inner Mongolia Regional Committee of the Chinese People's Political Consultative Conference
- In office January 2017 – January 2021
- Chairman: Ren Yaping; Li Jia; Li Xiuling

Personal details
- Born: September 1957 (age 69) Linxi County, Inner Mongolia, China
- Party: Chinese Communist Party (1981–2025; expelled)
- Education: Chifeng Normal School; Inner Mongolia Normal University

Wang Zhonghe (Chinese: 王中和; pinyin: Wáng Zhōnghé; born September 1957) is a former Chinese politician who spent most of his career in north China's Inner Mongolia. He was investigated by China's top anti-graft agency in February 2025. He has been retired for 4 years. Previously he served as vice chairman of the Inner Mongolia Regional Committee of the Chinese People's Political Consultative Conference.

== Early life and education ==
Wang was born in Linxi County, Inner Mongolia, in September 1957. He graduated from Chifeng Normal School and Inner Mongolia Normal University.

== Career ==
Wang was a teacher before getting involved in politics in 1981. He joined the Chinese Communist Party (CCP) in June 1981. In September 1981, he was assigned to the Publicity Department of the CCP Linxi County Committee, where he was promoted to the head position in 1987. In June 1992, he became deputy party secretary of Linxi County, rising to party secretary in May 1996. He briefly served as secretary-general of the CCP Xilingol League Committee in March 1998, head of the Organization Department in October 1998, and deputy party secretary of Xilingol League in December 2001. In November 2005, he was appointed deputy secretary-general of the CCP Inner Mongolia Regional Committee, but having held the position for only two years. He was made vice mayor of Chifeng in January 2008, and a month later promoted to the mayor position. He was elevated to party secretary, the top political position in the city, in January 2011. He was party secretary of Baotou in August 2013, and held that office until November 2016. In January 2017, he took the position of vice chairman of the Inner Mongolia Regional of the Chinese People's Political Consultative Conference, the regional advisory body.

== Investigation ==
On 16 February 2025, Wang was put under investigation for alleged "serious violations of discipline and laws" by the Central Commission for Discipline Inspection (CCDI), the party's internal disciplinary body, and the National Supervisory Commission, the highest anti-corruption agency of China. On July 30, he was expelled from the CCP. On November 12, he was indicted on suspicion of accepting bribes.

On 27 April 2026, Wang was sentenced to 17 years and fined 6 million yuan.

Government offices
Preceded by Xu Guoyuan	Mayor of Chifeng; 2008–2011	Succeeded by Bao Manda
Party political offices
Preceded by Hang Guilin	Communist Party Secretary of Chifeng; 2011–2013	Succeeded by Wang Chengxi
Preceded by Guo Qijun	Communist Party Secretary of Baotou; 2013–2016	Succeeded by Zhang Yuanzhong
