= Fu Zhongwei =

Chinese politician

- 付忠伟

Chairman of Shenyang Municipal People's Congress
- In office 7 February 2021 – 9 November 2022
- Preceded by: Pan Liguo
- Succeeded by: TBA

Communist Party Secretary of Panjin
- In office February 2018 – December 2020
- Preceded by: Gao Ke
- Succeeded by: Zhang Chengzhong

Personal details
- Born: October 1963 (age 62–63) Haicheng County, Liaoning, China
- Party: Chinese Communist Party (1984–2023; expelled)
- Education: Harbin Institute of Technology; Dalian University of Technology; National University of Singapore

Chinese name
- Simplified Chinese: 付忠伟
- Traditional Chinese: 付忠偉
Transcriptions
Standard Mandarin
- Hanyu Pinyin: Fù Zhōngwěi

Fu Zhongwei (Chinese: 付忠伟; born October 1963) is a former Chinese politician who spent his entire career in northeast China's Liaoning province. As of November 2022, he was under investigation by China's top anti-corruption agency. He is the second ministerial-level official to be targeted by anti-corruption authorities since the 20th National Congress of the Chinese Communist Party in October 2022. Previously he served as chairman of Shenyang Municipal People's Congress and before that, party secretary of Panjin.

He was a representative of the 19th National Congress of the Chinese Communist Party

== Early life and education ==
Fu was born in Haicheng County (now Haicheng), Liaoning, in October 1963. In 1982, he enrolled at Harbin Institute of Technology, where he majored in management engineering. After graduating in 1986, he taught at North China Institute of Aerospace Engineering. He also received an MBA from Dalian University of Technology in 1997 and a master's degree in public administration from National University of Singapore in 2006.

== Political career ==
Fu joined the Chinese Communist Party (CCP) in July 1984.

Fu got involved in politics in 1988, when he was an official in the Industrial Traffic Audit Division of Dalian Municipal Audit Bureau, where he eventually becoming its director in 1995. In 1998, he was appointed assistant director of Liaoning Provincial Audit Office, becoming deputy director in 2001 and director in 2015. In 2018, he was named party secretary of Panjin, his first foray into a prefectural leadership role. In 2020, he was named chairman of Shenyang Municipal People's Congress, confirmed in 2021.

== Investigation ==
On 9 September 2022, Fu has been placed under investigation for "serious violations of laws and regulations" by the Central Commission for Discipline Inspection (CCDI), the party's internal disciplinary body, and the National Supervisory Commission, the highest anti-corruption agency of China.

On 28 June 2023, Fu was expelled from the CCP and removed from public office. On October 20, he was indicted on suspicion of accepting bribes.

On 29 March 2024, Fu's trial was held at the Intermediate People's Court in Harbin, Heilongjiang. Prosecutors accused Fu of taking advantage of his different positions between 2003 and 2022 to seek profits for various companies and individuals in enterprise operation, case handling, and job transfer, in return, he accepted money and property worth over 64.7 million yuan ($8.93 million). On June 3, he was sentenced to 15 years in prison and fined 5 million yuan on taking bribes.

Party political offices
Preceded by Gao Ke	Communist Party Secretary of Panjin; 2018–2020	Succeeded by Zhang Chengzhong
Government offices
Preceded by Pan Liguo	Chairman of Shenyang Municipal People's Congress; 2021–2022	Succeeded by TBA
