= Zhang Lingping =

Chinese politician

- 张令平

Communist Party Secretary of Dingxi
- In office December 2013 – May 2017
- Preceded by: Yang Zixing
- Succeeded by: Tang Xiaoming

Communist Party Secretary of Jinchang
- In office September 2011 – December 2013
- Preceded by: Zheng Yusheng
- Succeeded by: Wu Mingming

Mayor of Jinchang
- In office June 2008 – August 2011
- Preceded by: Zheng Yusheng
- Succeeded by: Zhang Yinghua

Personal details
- Born: July 1962 (age 64) Tengzhou, Shandong, China
- Party: Chinese Communist Party (1985–2020; expelled)
- Education: Northwest Normal University

Chinese name
- Simplified Chinese: 张令平
- Traditional Chinese: 張令平
Transcriptions
Standard Mandarin
- Hanyu Pinyin: Zhāng Lìngpíng

Zhang Lingping (Chinese: 张令平; born July 1962) is a former Chinese politician who his entire career in northwest China's Gansu province. He was investigated by China's top anti-graft agency in August 2020. Previously he served as party secretary of both cities of Jinchang and Dingxi. He was a delegate to the 12th National People's Congress.

== Biography ==
Zhang was born in Tengzhou, Shandong, in July 1962. In 1979, he was admitted to Northwest Normal University, majoring in political education. After graduating in 1983, he joined the Jinchuan Group Co., Ltd., a state-owned non-ferrous metal processing enterprise, and worked for over 20 years.

He joined the Chinese Communist Party (CCP) in June 1985, and got involved in politics in December 2003, when he was appointed head of the Organization Department in Jinchang, he was also admitted to member of the standing committee of the CCP Jinchang Municipal Committee, the city's top authority. He served as mayor from April 2008 to September 2011, and party secretary, the top political position in the city, from September 2011 to December 2013. Then he was transferred to Dingxi and appointed party secretary, a position he held until April 2017.

=== Downfall ===
On 28 August 2019, he was put under investigation for alleged "serious violations of discipline and laws" by the Central Commission for Discipline Inspection (CCDI), the party's internal disciplinary body, and the National Supervisory Commission, the highest anti-corruption agency of China.

On 18 January 2020, he was expelled from the Communist Party and dismissed from public office. He was detained by the Supreme People's Procuratorate in February. On March 18, he was indicted on suspicion of accepting bribes. On December 1, he stood trial at the Lanzhou Railway Transportation Intermediate Court on charges of taking bribes. According to the indictment, he used his various positions in both cities of Jinchang and Dingxi to help others obtain projects and personnel promotions and in return, he illegally accepted 18.43 million yuan, $200,000, Euro 100,000, Hong Kong $200,000, 40 ounces of gold, a 5.05 carat naked diamond and 17 calligraphy and painting works, personally or through his family members. He received a sentence of 14 years in prison and fine of 1 million yuan for taking bribes. All his property gained from the bribery would be turned over to the national treasury.

== Personal life ==
Zhang, his wife and son and three brothers and sisters were all investigated for taking bribes.

Government offices
Preceded by Zheng Yusheng	Mayor of Jinchang; 2008–2011	Succeeded by Zhang Yinghua
Party political offices
Preceded by Zheng Yusheng	Communist Party Secretary of Jinchang; 2011–2013	Succeeded by Wu Mingming
Preceded by Yang Zixing	Communist Party Secretary of Dingxi; 2013–2017	Succeeded by Tang Xiaoming
