= Naw Kham =

Shan-Burmese drug trafficker (1969–2013)

Sai Naw Kham
- ၼေႃႇၶမ်း (Shan)
- Born: Naw Kham; 8 November 1969; Lashio, Shan State, Burma
- Died: 1 March 2013 (aged 43); Kunming, Yunnan, China
- Occupation: Druglord
- Organization: Hawngleuk Militia
- Criminal charge: Murder
- Criminal penalty: Lethal injection
- Criminal status: Executed
- Parent(s): Khun Zeun, Nang Mya Oo

Sai Naw Kham (Burmese: နော်ခမ်း; Shan: ၼေႃႇၶမ်း; also spelled Nor Kham; 8 November 1969 – 1 March 2013) was an ethnic Shan associate of the Chinese drug trafficker Khun Sa who operated in the Golden Triangle, a major drugs-smuggling area where the borders of Burma, Laos and Thailand converge. He was executed for alleged involvement in the killing of 13 Chinese sailors.

Excessive media coverage and live broadcast of the execution were seen in Myanmar as a Chinese attempt to frame the ethnic Shans and the Burmese for the drug problems; China had previously allowed drug traffickers like Pheung Kya-shin to roam free in China. Since the KMT retreated to Burma in the early 1950s, ethnic Chinese drug lords have set up a drug empire in the Golden Triangle, taking advantage of their global networks, which the natives lacked. Profits from the drug trade have allowed the Chinese to expand and replace the native populations. As a result, parts of northern Myanmar and the city of Mandalay have become effectively sinicized.

== Background ==
Naw Kham was formerly a subordinate associate of Khun Sa, a major ethnic Chinese drug lord who surrendered to the Burmese government in 1996 in exchange for amnesty. Naw's gang numbered in the hundreds and included members of Khun Sa's former paramilitary forces, along with ethnic rebels. At its height, Naw Kham's militia, the Hawngleuk Militia had 100 members and was based out of Tachileik, near the Thai-Burmese border. It was composed of guerillas from Shan State ethnic minorities such as the Shan, Wa, Lahu, Kachin and Palaung. The militia was involved in trafficking of methamphetamine and heroin, kidnapping, murder, racketeering, and banditry in the Mekong River area.

== In custody ==
After the Mekong River massacre in October 2011 and subsequent backlash from the Chinese, Laotian officials arrested Naw Kham and extradited him to China on 10 May 2012. Then in the July 2012 raids of Naw Kham's militia bases, Burmese authorities seized over 600,000 methamphetamine pills and 120 bars of heroin. Hunting for Naw Kham, the Chinese "special task group" has used new technologies such as the Beidou System according to the Ministry of Public Security of the People's Republic of China. Because the gang's remote hiding area is difficult to reach, even a UAV "execution operation" was once proposed.

On 21 September 2012, Naw Kham pleaded guilty at the Intermediate People's Court in Kunming, Yunnan to the murders of thirteen Chinese sailors killed during the Mekong River massacre. He and three of his subordinates were sentenced to death. On 26 December 2012, the Yunnan Higher Court rejected Naw Kham's appeals, upholding the death penalties.

== Trial and execution ==
Naw Kham was executed by lethal injection in Kunming on 1 March 2013 together with his three subordinates: Hsang Kham from Thailand; Yi Lai, stateless; and Zha Xika, a Laotian. Another two members of Naw Kham's gang, identified as Zha Bo and Zha Tuobo, received a death sentence with reprieve and eight years in prison, respectively.
