= Zhang Jianchun =

Chinese politician

- 张建春
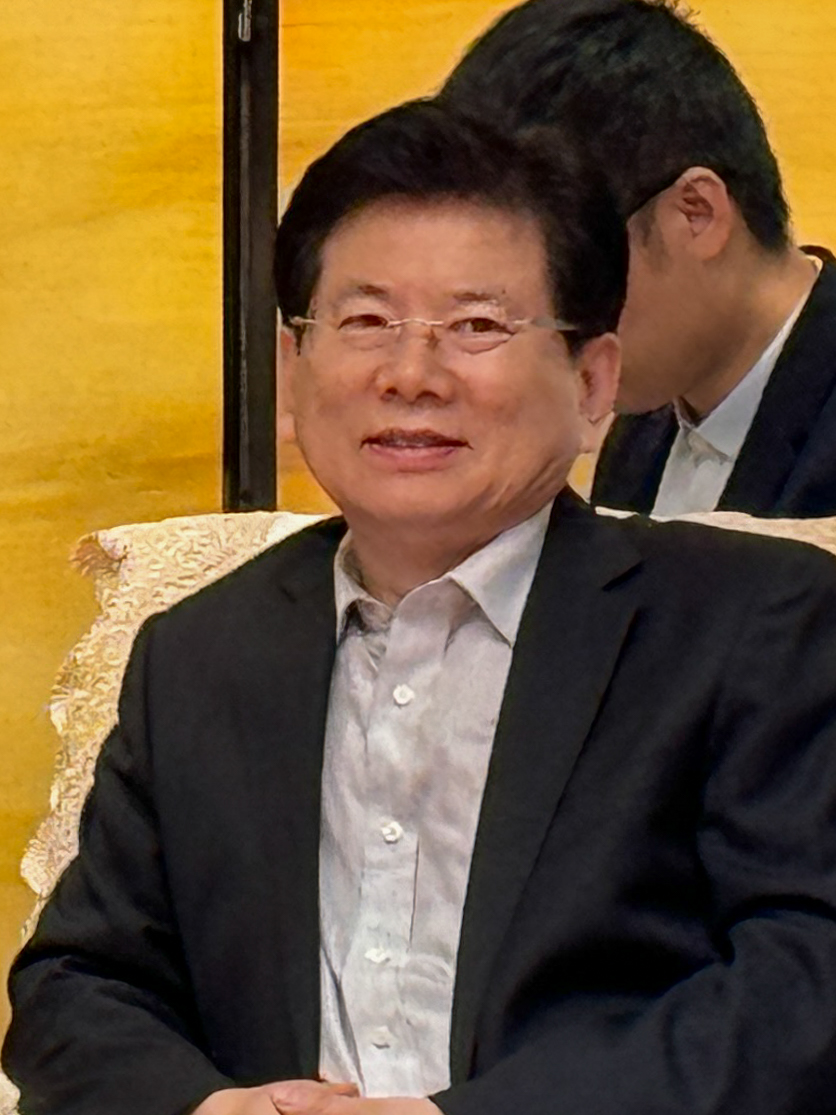

Deputy Head of the Publicity Department of the Chinese Communist Party
- In office December 2020 – June 2024
- Head: Huang Kunming; Li Shulei

Deputy Head of the Organization Department of the Chinese Communist Party
- In office 2018–2020
- Head: Chen Xi

Personal details
- Born: May 1965 (age 61) Yuncheng County, Shandong, China
- Party: Chinese Communist Party (1987–2024; expelled)
- Education: Capital Normal University

Chinese name
- Simplified Chinese: 张建春
- Traditional Chinese: 張建春
Transcriptions
Standard Mandarin
- Hanyu Pinyin: Zhāng Jiànchūn

Zhang Jianchun (Chinese: 张建春; born May 1965) is a former Chinese politician. As of June 2024 he was under investigation by China's top anti-graft watchdog. Previously, he served as deputy head of the Publicity Department of the Chinese Communist Party and before that, deputy head of the Organization Department of the Chinese Communist Party.

Zhang was a representative of the 20th National Congress of the Chinese Communist Party. He was a member of the 14th National Committee of the Chinese People's Political Consultative Conference.

== Career ==
Zhang was born in Yuncheng County, Shandong, in May 1965, and graduated from Capital Normal University. He entered the workforce in July 1984, and joined the Chinese Communist Party (CCP) in September 1987. He worked in the Organization Department of the CCP Shandong Provincial Committee for a long time.

Zhang was promoted to deputy head of the Organization Department of the CCP Beijing Municipal Committee in January 2018. In May 2015 he was promoted again to become executive deputy head.

In March 2016, Zhang was transferred to the Organization Department of the Chinese Communist Party, and over a period of two years worked his way up to the position of deputy head.

In December 2020, Zhang was appointed deputy head of the Publicity Department of the Chinese Communist Party.

== Downfall ==
On 21 June 2024, Zhang was put under investigation for alleged "serious violations of discipline and laws" by the Central Commission for Discipline Inspection (CCDI), the party's internal disciplinary body, and the National Supervisory Commission, the highest anti-corruption agency of China. On December 10, he was stripped of his posts within the CCP and in the public office. On December 31, he was detained by the Supreme People's Procuratorate.

On 18 April 2025, Zhang was indicted on suspicion of accepting bribes. On September 16, he was sentenced to 14 years in prison for bribery and fined 4 million yuan ($560,000) by the Langfang Intermediate People's Court in Hebei province.
