= Liu Handong =

Chinese politician (born 1959)

- 刘捍东

Vice Chairman of Jiangsu Provincial People's Congress
- In office January 2018 – January 2023
- Chairman: Lou Qinjian; Wu Zhenglong

Personal details
- Born: August 1959 (age 67) Shucheng, Anhui, China
- Party: Chinese Communist Party (1984–2024; expelled)
- Education: Nanjing Normal University; Central Party School of the Chinese Communist Party

Chinese name
- Simplified Chinese: 刘捍东
- Traditional Chinese: 劉捍東
Transcriptions
Standard Mandarin
- Hanyu Pinyin: Liú Hàndōng

Liu Handong (Chinese: 刘捍东; born August 1959) is a former Chinese politician who spent most his entire career in east China's Jiangsu province. He was investigated by China's top anti-graft agency in April 2023. Previously he served as vice chairman of Jiangsu Provincial People's Congress.

He was a representative of the 17th, 18th, and 19th National Congress of the Chinese Communist Party.

== Career ==
Liu was born in Shucheng, Anhui, in August 1959. After the Cultural Revolution, in October 1977, he became a fitter at the General Machinery Factory of Jiangpu County (now Pukou District). In January 1979, he was accepted to Nanjing Normal University, where he majored in physics. After graduating in December 1980, he became a teacher at the Second Middle School of Jiangpu County.

Liu got involved in politics in April 1984, and joined the Chinese Communist Party (CCP) in December of that same year. He was town head of Chengdong Township and Zhujiang Town before being promoted to magistrate of Jiangpu County in June 1997. He was promoted again to become party secretary, the top political position in the county, in July 1999. He was appointed secretary of the Political and Legal Affairs Commission of the CCP Nanjing Municipal Committee in November 2001 and was admitted to member of the CCP Nanjing Municipal Committee, the capital city's top authority. He also served as party secretary of Pukou District from May 2002 to July 2005 and Jiangning District from July 2005 to April 2008. In April 2008, he was named acting mayor of Zhenjiang, confirmed in January 2009. He was head of Jiangsu Provincial Department of Finance in January 2012, in addition to serving as vice chairman of Jiangsu Provincial People's Congress since January 2018.

== Investigation ==
On 16 April 2023, he was suspected of "serious violations of laws and regulations" by the Central Commission for Discipline Inspection (CCDI), the party's internal disciplinary body, and the National Supervisory Commission, the highest anti-corruption agency of China.

On 26 February 2024, Liu hwas expelled from the CCP and dismissed from public office. On March 13, he was arrested by the Supreme People's Procuratorate. On August 5, he was indicted on suspicion of accepting bribes. On October 31, he stood trial at the Intermediate People's Court of Xiangyang on charges of taking bribes, the public prosecutors accused him of abusing his multiple positions between 1999 and 2023 in Jiangsu to seek favor on behalf of certain organizations and individuals in land transfer, enterprise operation, and job adjustment, in return, he accepted 245 million yuan ($34.1 million) worth of money and valuables either himself or via his family members.

On 17 February 2025, Liu was sentenced to death with a two-year reprieve for taking bribes, he was also deprived of his political rights for life, and ordered by the court to have all his personal assets confiscated and turn over all illicit gains and their interests to the state.

Party political offices
Preceded by Xu Jinrong	Mayor of Zhenjiang; 2008–2012	Succeeded by Zhu Xiaoming
Government offices
Preceded by Pan Yonghe	Head of Jiangsu Provincial Department of Finance; 2012–2018	Succeeded by Yang Shengshi
