= Duzhe =

Chinese magazine

- Cover of Duzhe from 2008
- Frequency: Bimonthly
- Publisher: Gansu People's Press
- Founded: 1981
- First issue: March 1981
- Country: China
- Based in: Lanzhou, Gansu
- Language: Chinese
- Website: www.duzhe.com/
- ISSN: 1005-1805

Duzhe (Chinese: 读者; pinyin: Dúzhě; lit. 'The Readers') is a bimonthly Chinese general interest magazine. It is among the most widely circulated and the leading magazines in the People's Republic of China.

== History and profile ==
Duzhe was first published in Lanzhou in March 1981, with the original name as Duzhe Wenzhai (Chinese: 读者文摘; pinyin: Dúzhě Wénzhāi; lit. 'Reader's Digest'). Due to the name conflict with Reader's Digest, the name was changed to the current title Duzhe in 1993.

The magazine has its headquarters in Lanzhou, and is published on a biweekly basis by the Gansu People's Press. The magazine includes original articles, condensed articles reprinted from other magazines, book excerpts, and collections of jokes, anecdotes, quotations and other short pieces.

Headquarter of Duzhe in Lanzhou

During the first half of the 2000s the magazine was published bi-monthly. In 2003 Duzhe was among the top five magazines in China with a circulation of 3,000,000. The same year it was also the 4th best selling magazine in the world, after Reader's Digest, National Geographic and Time.
