= Li Jinfa =

Chinese architect, sculptor

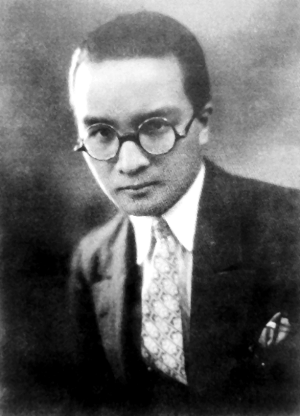
Portrait photo of symbolist poet Li Jinfa.

Li Jinfa (李金髮; November 21, 1900 – December 25, 1976) was a Chinese poet, sculptor, and diplomat of Hakka descent. Li was often considered to be the founder of Chinese symbolistic poetry and was credited with helping modernize Chinese poetry. Li was also a professional sculptor throughout most of his working life. Briefly from 1944 to 1946 , Li worked for Ministry of Foreign Affairs in Iraq and Iran. Li later immigrated to the United States where he remained until he died in 1976.

== Biography ==
Li Jinfa was born in Meizhou county in Guangdong, China in 1900. Li's parents and grandparents were farmers, and he grew up in a household of strict discipline.

In 1919, at the age of 17, Li left China from Shanghai to study in France. In France, Li was one of the first Chinese students to study western style sculpting. Meanwhile he was introduced to French literature such as the poetry from the French symbolist poets Charles Baudelaire and Paul Varlaine which influenced Li's future works. It was here in 1922 where Li adopted his typical pen name of "Li Jinfa" after receiving visits from a blonde goddess which he believed cured of an illness he was suffering at the time. His birth name was Li Shuliang. Li chose sculpting to be his college major and two of his works was showcased in a Pairs art exhibition.

In 1924 Li returned to China from Germany where he was offered a position at the Shanghai Academy of Fine Arts as the school's sole sculpting professor. Unfortunately, no students enrolled in Li's classes, so he was forced to resign and seek employment elsewhere. From 1924 to 1928 Li worked at a myriad of different academic and governmental intuitions. In March of 1928 Lin was offered to be a sculpting professor at the National Hangzhou Art College. During that time, he established a sculpting firm with his friends called "Roman Engineering Office" in Shanghai.

Li began writing his poetry in 1920, but it was not he until he returned from Europe where Li published his first collection of poems “Light Rain”《微 雨》in 1925. A year later in 1926 Li published "Song for Happiness" 《为幸福而歌》and a year after that he released "Gourmet and the Bad Year" 《食客与凶年》 in 1927. In 1928 Li published "Ancient Greek Love Song" 《古希腊戀歌》.

Despite his first few collections of poems being regarded as his best work, these publications garnered little attention form the other literati. It was not until the 1930's were Li's initial publication of "Light Rain" began to be recognized as the first instance of Chinese symbolist poetry.

In 1931, Li resigned from teaching at Hangzhou Art school and moved to Guangzhou. There he took up jobs as a freelance sculptor. During this time, he erected two of his most famous statues which included bronze statues of Wu Tingfang in Guangzhou and statue of Sun Yat-sen at the entrance of the Sun Yat-sen Memorial Hall in Guangzhou.

In 1936 Li moved his family to Guangzhou to take up a teaching position at Guangzhou Municipal Art School. In 1938 Li and his family fled to Vietnam when the city was captured by the Imperial Japanese Army during the Second Sino-Japanese War. In 1940 Li returned to Guangdong province to the wartime capital of Shaoguan. During this time Li published patriotic poems in literary magazines in support of the Chinese war effort against the Japanese. During the war Li published his last major poetic work titled "Exotic" 《异国情调》.

In 1941, Li began working for the Ministry of Foreign Affairs. In 1944 Li was appointed the position as of first secretary to the Republic of China's embassy in Iran, later he was made chargé d'affaires to the Chinese Embassy in Iraq.

In 1951 Li immigrated to the United States where he became a chicken farmer before using his skills as a sculptor to make a living. Li died in New York in 1976.

== Poetry collections ==
Title	Year Published
"Light Rain" 《微雨》	1925
"Song for Happiness" 《为幸福而歌》	1926
"Gourmet and the Bad Year" 《食客与凶年》	1927
"Ancient Greek Love Song" 《古希腊戀歌》	1928
"Exotic" 《异国情调》	(???) Sometime during the Second-Sino Japanese War

== Major sculptures ==
Description	Location
Bronze statue of Sun Yat-sen	Dr. Sun Yat-Sen's Memorial Hall, Guangzhou, Guangdong, China
Bronze statue of Wu Tingfang	Yuexiu Mountain, Guangzhou, Guangdong, China
