= Chen Jixing =

Chinese politician (born 1954)

- 陈继兴

Vice Chairman of Guangdong Provincial People's Congress
- In office January 2012 – January 2018
- Chairman: Ou Guangyuan; Huang Longyun; Li Yumei

Personal details
- Born: August 1954 (age 72) Zengcheng County, Guangdong, China
- Party: Chinese Communist Party (1974–2024; expelled)
- Education: Guangzhou Finance School; South China Normal University; Royal Roads University

Chinese name
- Simplified Chinese: 陈继兴
- Traditional Chinese: 陳繼興
Transcriptions
Standard Mandarin
- Hanyu Pinyin: Chén Jìxīng

Chen Jixing (Chinese: 陈继兴; born August 1954) is a retired Chinese politician who spent his entire career in south China's Guangdong province. He joined the Chinese Communist Party (CCP) in December 1974, and entered the workforce in September 1977. As of July 2023 he was under investigation by China's top anti-corruption agency. He has retired for five years. Previously he served as vice chairman of Guangdong Provincial People's Congress.

He was a representative of the 16th National Congress of the Chinese Communist Party.

== Early life and education ==
Chen was born in Zengcheng County (now Zengcheng District of Guangzhou), Guangdong, in August 1954. In 1975, he enrolled at Guangzhou Finance School, where he graduated in 1977.

== Career ==
Starting in September 1977, he served in several posts in Guangdong Provincial Department of Finance, including section member, deputy director of Budget Department, director of Budget Department, deputy head of the Guangdong Provincial Department of Finance, and eventually head in March 1998.

He was party secretary of Jiangmen in October 2002, in addition to serving as chairman of the Jiangmen Municipal People's Congress.

He was transferred back to Guangzhou in November 2011 and was elevated to vice chairman of Guangdong Provincial People's Congress.

== Downfall ==
On 9 July 2023, he was suspected of "serious violations of laws and regulations" by the Central Commission for Discipline Inspection (CCDI), the party's internal disciplinary body, and the National Supervisory Commission, the highest anti-corruption agency of China.

On 6 January 2024, he was expelled from the CCP and was disqualified from his retirement benefits. His illicit gains will be confiscated and the suspected crimes will be transferred to the procuratorate for further investigation and prosecution. On January 16, he was arrested by the Supreme People's Procuratorate. On May 30, he was indicted on suspicion of accepting bribes. On August 29, he stood trial at the Intermediate People's Court of Guilin on charges of taking bribes, he was accused of abusing his powers in former positions he held between 2002 and 2015 in Guangdong to seek benefits for relevant organizations and individuals in project development, land transfer, and economic dispute resolution, in return, he accepted 278 million yuan ($38.8 million) worth of money and valuables directly or through his relatives. On November 12, he was sentenced to death with a two-year reprieve for bribery, he was deprived of political rights for life and all his properties were also confiscated.

Party political offices
Preceded by Jiang Jin	Communist Party Secretary of Jiangmen; 2002–2011	Succeeded by Liu Hai
Assembly seats
Preceded by Jiang Jin	Chairman of the Jiangmen Municipal People's Congress; 2003–2011	Succeeded by Liu Hai
