= Mekong River massacre =

2011 hijacking of two Chinese cargo ships and subsequent massacre of all 13 crew members

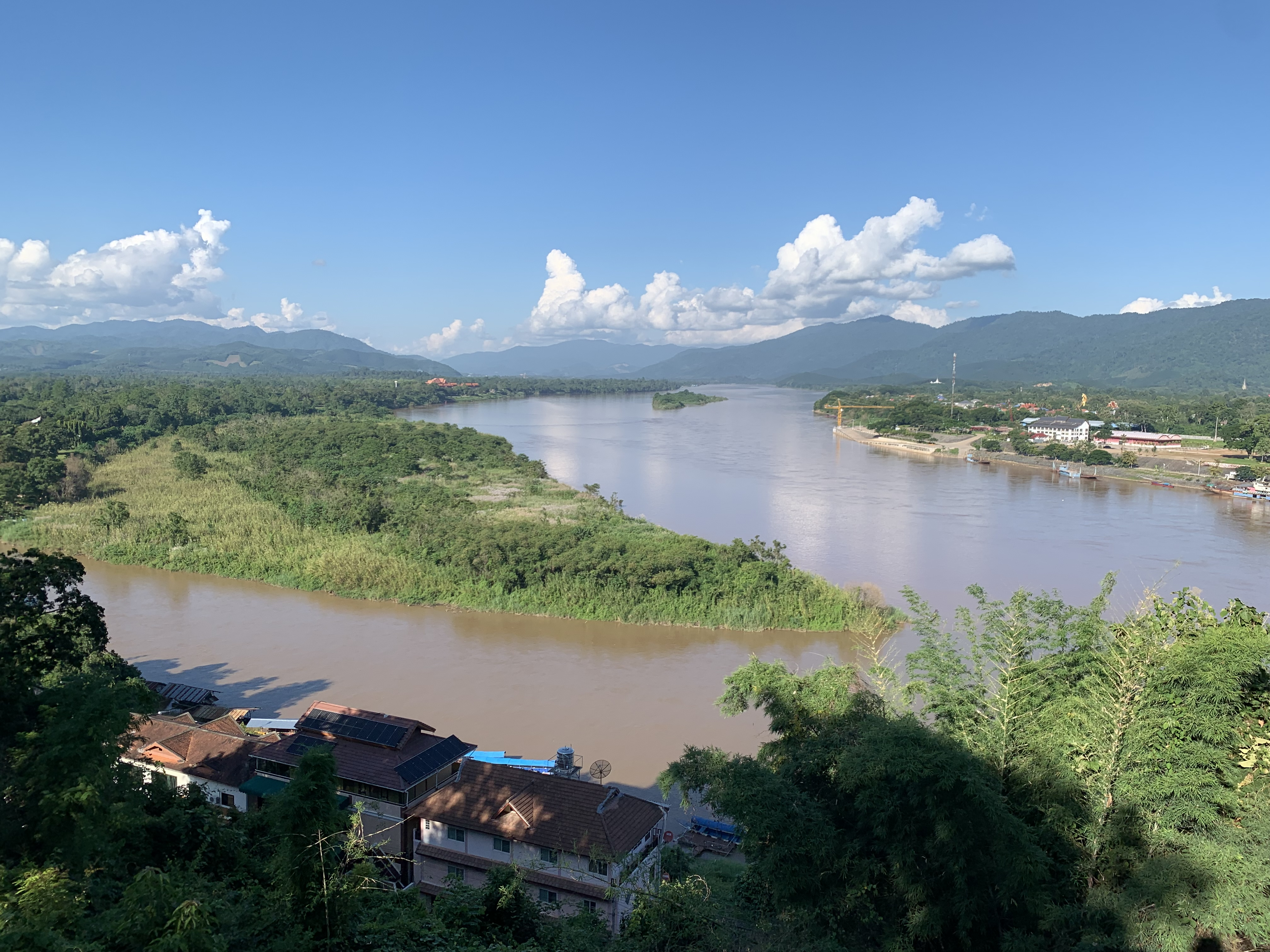
- Mekong River in the Golden Triangle region around where the massacre took place

- Location: Chiang Saen District, Chiang Rai Province, Thailand
- Date: 5 October 2011; 15 years ago
- Attack type: Hijacking of ships, massacre
- Deaths: 13 Chinese crew members

The Mekong River massacre occurred on the morning of 5 October 2011, when two Chinese cargo ships were attacked on a stretch of the Mekong River in the Golden Triangle region on the borders of Myanmar (Burma) and Thailand. All 13 crew members on both ships were killed and dumped in the river. It was the deadliest attack on Chinese nationals abroad in modern times. In response, China temporarily suspended shipping on the Mekong, and reached an agreement with Myanmar, Thailand and Laos to jointly patrol the river. The event was also the impetus for the Naypyidaw Declaration and other anti-drug cooperation efforts in the region. On 28 October 2011, Thai authorities arrested nine Pha Muang Task Force soldiers, who subsequently "disappeared from the justice system". Drug lord Naw Kham and three subordinates were eventually tried and executed by the Chinese government for their roles in the massacre.

== Background ==
The Mekong is a major waterway of Southeast Asia. It originates in China, where it is called the Lancang River, and flows through Myanmar, Laos, Thailand, Cambodia, and Vietnam, where it empties into the South China Sea. It is a major trading route between China's southwestern Yunnan Province and the countries of Southeast Asia. After leaving China, the river flows through the Golden Triangle area, where the borders of Myanmar, Thailand, and Laos meet. The region has long been plagued by lawlessness and is notorious for drug smuggling. An owner of one of the hijacked ships stated that almost every Chinese boat in the area had been robbed by river gangs.

The incident caused the Burmese government to come under fire; an editorial in the Bangkok Post accused the Burmese government of being "not even mildly serious about combating the savage drug gangs," calling for pressure on the Burmese government to resolve the problem. However, the very remote nature of the river makes any government enforcement difficult. After the defeat of the Kuomintang by the Communists in the Chinese Civil War in 1949 many Kuomintang soldiers in Yunnan fled with their families to Burma and Thailand. These soldiers were commanded by General Li Mi and were known as the "Lost Army." After attempting several failed invasions of Yunnan, in 1953 the Burmese government made an appeal to the United Nations and many Kuomintang soldiers and their families were expelled and flown to Taiwan. Many returned to Taiwan but since some Kuomintang veterans and their families stayed in Thailand and Burma, ethnic Chinese drug lords have set up underground trading networks between Burma and Thailand, including some drug empires in the Golden Triangle, taking advantage of their global networks which the natives lacked. Profits from both legal and illegal trade have allowed ethnic Chinese to expand their businesses and triggered xenophobic reactions from the native populations. As a result, Burmese scholars such as Mya Maung have claimed that parts of northern Myanmar and the city of Mandalay have become effectively sinicized and blamed them for "moral decline", while ethnic Chinese have responded by dismissing the natives as lazy.

== Massacre ==
According to the crew of a different boat who witnessed the attack, about eight gunmen stormed the Chinese cargo ships Hua Ping and Yu Xing 8 in the morning of 5 October 2011. The hijacking reportedly occurred in Burmese waters. Later during the day, Thai river police in the northernmost Chiang Rai Province recovered the ships after a gunfight, and found about 900,000 amphetamine pills worth more than US$3 million. The bodies of the Chinese crew members were later retrieved from the river. They had been shot or stabbed, and some had been bound or blindfolded.

Victims
On Hua Ping
* Huang Yong (黄勇), captain
* Cai Fanghua (蔡方华), engineer
* Wang Jianjun (王建军), pilot
* Qiu Jiahai (邱家海), chief engineer
* Yang Yingdong (杨应东), sailor
* Li Yan (李燕), cook
On Yu Xing 8
* He Xilun (何熙伦), co-captain
* Guo Zhiqiang (郭志强), co-captain
* Yang Deyi (杨德毅), co-captain
* Wang Guichao (王贵超), chief engineer
* Wen Daihong (文代洪), pilot
* He Xixing (何熙行)
* Zeng Baocheng (曾保成)
* Yang Zhiwei (杨植纬), son of Yang Deyi
* Chen Guoying (陈国英)

== Investigation ==
According to the police chief of Chiang Rai Province, drug gangs demanded protection money from boats on the Mekong and sometimes hijacked them to transport illegal goods. The police suspected from the beginning that the mastermind of the massacre was Naw Kham (also spelled Nor Kham), an ethnic Shan Burmese national in his forties, an alleged drug lord and pirate in the Golden Triangle. He was believed to be a former aide of the notorious drug kingpin Khun Sa, and leader of a gang with more than 100 members who had been involved in drug trafficking, kidnapping, murder, and piracy along the Mekong for years. However, further investigations also implicated nine Thai soldiers belonging to an elite anti-narcotics army unit. They were also investigated by Thailand.

After a long manhunt involving Chinese and Thai authorities, in late April 2012 Lao security forces captured Naw Kham in Bokeo Province and extradited him to China in May. Naw Kham admitted to Chinese authorities that he was responsible for the massacre, while Myanmar planned to extradite to China Naw Kham's aide who was believed to possess key information about the attack.

== Criminal justice ==
On 6 November 2012, China's Intermediate People's Court of Kunming in Yunnan province sentenced Naw Kham and three of his subordinates to death: one from Thailand, one from Laos and one that "Chinese state media referred to as stateless". Two others, Zha Bo and Zha Tuobo, were given a death sentence with reprieve and eight years in prison, respectively. The six defendants were fined a total of 6,000,000 yuan ($960,000). Approximately 300 spectators were present at the verdict, including relatives of the victims, media, and diplomats from Laos and Thailand. The death sentences were carried out on 1 March 2013.

== Reactions ==
The massacre sparked outrage among the Chinese public; China temporarily suspended all Chinese shipping on the Mekong. In December 2011 China, Myanmar, Laos and Thailand began joint patrols on the Mekong after a security agreement was reached among the four countries, with more than 200 Chinese border police from Yunnan Province taking part. It was the first such joint deployment in Southeast Asia, and is seen as an expansion of China's growing role in regional security.

== Further attacks ==
On 4 January 2012, a Burmese patrol boat and four Chinese cargo ships were attacked on the Mekong in Myanmar. Several grenades were fired, possibly from M79 grenade launchers, but all missed the boats.

== In popular culture ==
The film Operation Mekong (directed by Dante Lam), based on the incident, was released in September 2016. With a box office of 1.18 billion yuan, it became one of the highest-grossing films in China.
