= Zhou Jiabin =

Chinese politician

- 周家斌
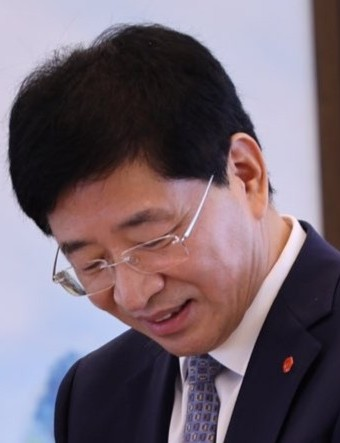
- Zhou in 2024

Vice Chairperson of the People's Congress of Guangxi Zhuang Autonomous Region
- In office January 2023 – December 2024
- Chairperson: Liu Ning

Communist Party Secretary of Guilin
- In office February 2021 – December 2024
- Preceded by: Zhao Leqin
- Succeeded by: Li Chu

Personal details
- Born: September 1964 (age 62) Juancheng County, Shandong, China
- Party: Chinese Communist Party (1986–2025; expelled)
- Education: Tsinghua University; China University of Geosciences (Beijing)

Zhou Jiabin (Chinese: 周家斌; pinyin: Zhōu Jiābīn; born September 1964) is a former Chinese politician who spent most of his career in southwest China's Guangxi Zhuang Autonomous Region. As of December 2024, he was under investigation by China's top anti-graft watchdog. Previously he served as party secretary of Guilin and vice chairperson of the People's Congress of Guangxi Zhuang Autonomous Region.

Zhou was a delegate to the 12th National People's Congress and a representative of the 20th National Congress of the Chinese Communist Party.

== Early life and education ==
Zhou was born in Juancheng County, Shandong, in September 1964. In 1983, he entered Tsinghua University, where he majored in architecture. He joined the Chinese Communist Party (CCP) in May 1986. He earned his Ph.D.degree in engineering from the China University of Geosciences in January 2008.

== Career ==
After university in 1988, Zhou was despatched to Diaoyutai State Guesthouse Management Bureau of the Ministry of Foreign Affairs as an architect. He moved to the Chinese Institute of Interior Architects in June 1994. He then briefly served as president of Beijing Boer Institute of Biological Sciences in August 2000, president of Beijing Academy of Modern Applied Sciences in February 2001, vice president of the Architectural Society of China in September 2005, and director of the Cooperative Development Department of the Information Center of the Development Research Center of the State Council of China in September 2007.

In July 2008, Zhou was transferred to southwest China's Guangxi Zhuang Autonomous Region and appointed deputy director of the Construction Department of Guangxi Zhuang Autonomous Region. He was made vice mayor of Nanning in September 2008 and three months later was admitted to standing committee member of the CCP Nanning Municipal Committee, the city's top authority. In August 2011, he was named acting mayor of Beihai, confirmed in the following month. He was appointed mayor of Guilin in February 2015, concurrently serving as deputy party secretary. He became director of the Housing and Urban Rural Development Department of Guangxi Zhuang Autonomous Region in December 2017. He was elevated to party secretary of Guilin in February 2021, in addition to serving as vice chairperson of the People's Congress of Guangxi Zhuang Autonomous Region since January 2023.

== Downfall ==
On 28 December 2024, Zhou was put under investigation for alleged "serious violations of discipline and laws" by the Central Commission for Discipline Inspection (CCDI), the party's internal disciplinary body, and the National Supervisory Commission, the highest anti-corruption agency of China.

On 20 June 2025, Zhou was stripped of his posts within the CCP and in the public office. On November 20, he was indicted on suspicion of accepting bribes.

On 29 June 2026, Zhou was sentenced to life imprisonment for bribery in 198 million yuan.

Government offices
Preceded by Lian Younong	Mayor of Beihai; 2021–2015	Succeeded by Lin Shanqing
Preceded by Tang Zongyuan	Mayor of Guilin; 2015–2017	Succeeded by Qin Chencheng
Preceded by Yan Shiming	Director of the Housing and Urban Rural Development Department of Guangxi Zhuang Autonomous Region; 2017–2021	Succeeded by Tang Biaowen
Party political offices
Preceded by Zhao Leqin	Communist Party Secretary of Guilin; 2021–2024	Succeeded by Li Chu
