= Ji Guogang =

Chinese politician

- 纪国刚

Vice Chairman of the People's Congress of the Tibet Autonomous Region
- In office January 2016 – November 2022
- Chairman: Losang Jamcan

Personal details
- Born: August 1962 (age 64) Yanji, Jilin, China
- Party: Chinese Communist Party (expelled; 1984–2023)
- Education: Jilin University; Beijing Normal University

Chinese name
- Simplified Chinese: 纪国刚
- Traditional Chinese: 紀國剛
Transcriptions
Standard Mandarin
- Hanyu Pinyin: Jǐ Guógāng

Ji Guogang (Chinese: 纪国刚; born August 1962) is a former Chinese politician who was vice chairman of the People's Congress of the Tibet Autonomous Region between 2016 and 2022. As of November 2022 he was under investigation by China's top anti-corruption agency. He is the first senior official in Tibet Autonomous Region and the third senior official in China to be targeted by China's top anticorruption watchdog in 2022.

== Early life and education ==
Ji was born in Yanji, Jilin, in August 1962. After resuming the college entrance examination in 1979, he was accepted to Changchun Institute of Geology (now Jilin University), where he majored in regional geological survey and mineral survey. He also received his doctor's degree in economics from Beijing Normal University in 2015.

== Political career ==
After graduating in 1983, Ji was despatched to the State Planning Commission, which was reshuffled as the National Development and Reform Commission in 1998. He joined the Chinese Communist Party (CCP) in December 1984.

In 2012, Ji was transferred to southwest China's Tibet Autonomous Region. In December 2012, he became deputy director of the Development and Reform Commission of the Tibet Autonomous Region, rising to director the next year. He was vice chairman of the People's Congress of the Tibet Autonomous Region in January 2016, in addition to serving as party branch secretary of the Development and Reform Commission of the Tibet Autonomous Region.

== Investigation ==
On 16 November 2022, Ji was put under investigation for alleged "serious violations of discipline and laws" by the Central Commission for Discipline Inspection (CCDI), the party's internal disciplinary body, and the National Supervisory Commission, the highest anti-corruption agency of China.

On 16 May 2023, he was expelled from the CCP and dismissed from public office. On June 2, he was arrested by the Supreme People's Procuratorate. On September 1, he was indicted on suspicion of accepting bribes and abuse of power.

On 21 March 2024, Ji stood trial at the Intermediate People's Court of Chengdu on charges of taking bribes, the public prosecutors accused him of abusing his multiple positions between 2002 and 2022 to seek favor on behalf of certain organizations and individuals in engineering contracting, project approval, and equity transfer, in return, he accepted money and property worth over 43.98 million yuan ($6.13 million). On December 11, he was sentenced to 13 years and fined 3 million yuan for taking bribe and abuse of power, all his illegal gains will be confiscated and handed over to the state.

Government offices
Preceded by ?	Director of the Development and Reform Commission of the Tibet Autonomous Region; 2013–2016	Succeeded by Pubu Ciren
