= Xu Xianping =

Chinese politician (born 1954)

- 徐宪平
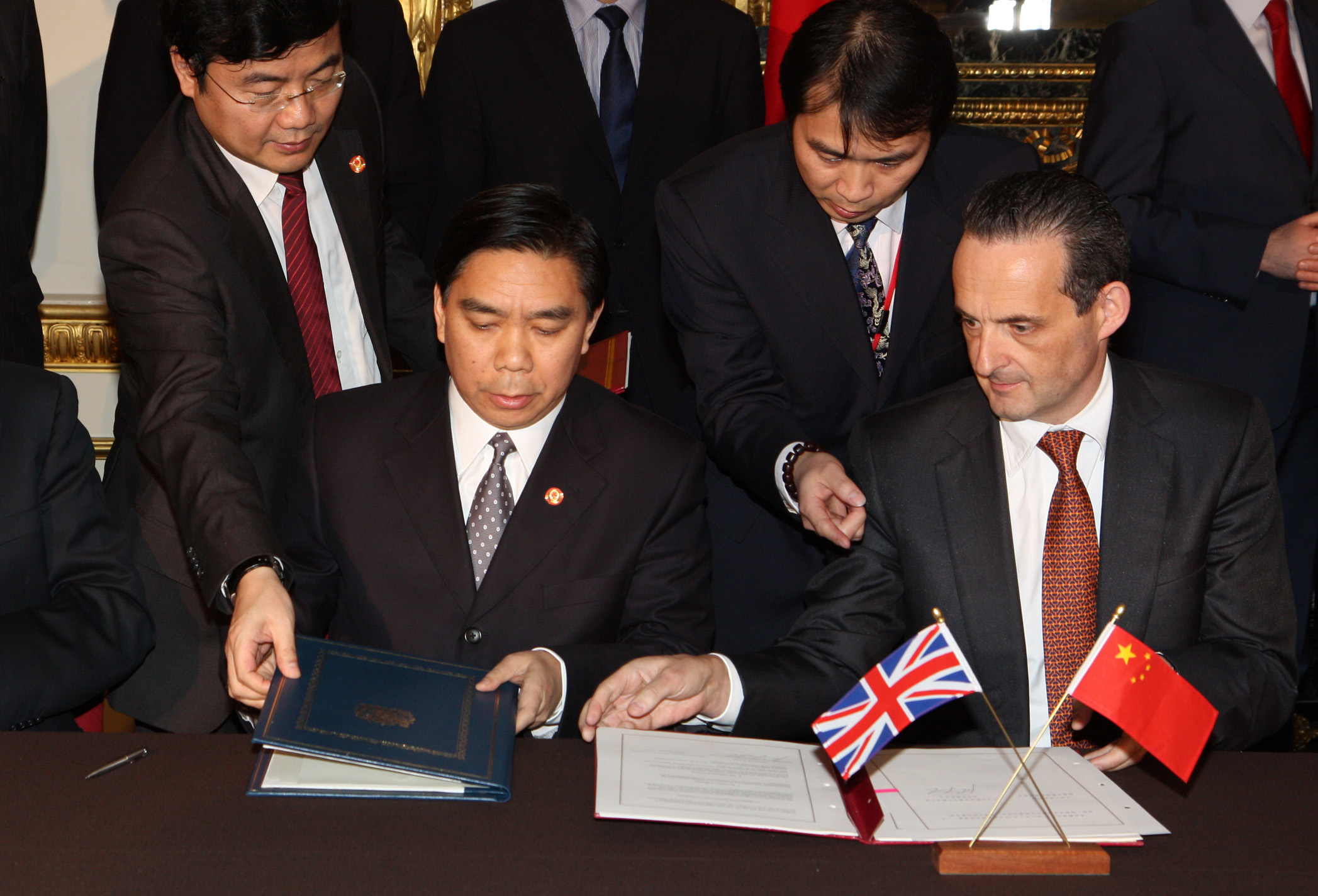
- John Fingleton (right) with Xu Xianping (left) in London, on 10 January 2011.

Deputy Director of National Development and Reform Commission
- In office May 2009 – February 2015
- Director: Xu Shaoshi

Vice-Governor of Hunan
- In office January 2003 – May 2014
- Governor: Xu Shousheng

Personal details
- Born: October 1954 (age 71–72) Longhui County, Hunan, China
- Party: Chinese Communist Party (expelled in 2025)

Xu Xianping (simplified Chinese: 徐宪平; traditional Chinese: 徐憲平; pinyin: Xú Xiànpíng; born October 1954) is a retired Chinese politician. He served as deputy director of National Development and Reform Commission between May 2009 and February 2015, and vice-governor of Hunan from January 2003 to May 2009.

He was a delegate to the 9th, 10th and 11th National People's Congress. He was also a member of the 12th National Committee of the Chinese People's Political Consultative Conference.

== Biography ==
Xu was born in Longhui County, Hunan in October 1954. In March 1973, during the Down to the Countryside Movement, he became a sent-down youth in Dachong Commune of Qianyang County.

Beginning in September 1984 he entered the Communist Youth League of China in Hunan, he served in several posts there, including secretary, deputy party chief and party group members.

In September 1994 he was promoted to become vice-mayor of Changsha, capital of Hunan, and then executive vice-mayor in December 1997.

In January 2003 he was promoted again to become vice-governor of Hunan, and held that office until May 2009. Then he was transferred to Beijing and appointed deputy director of National Development and Reform Commission, he served in the post until he retirement in February 2015.

In August 2016, he was hired as a consultant of the State Council of China.

== Downfall ==
On 27 March 2025, Xu was put under investigation for alleged "serious violations of discipline and laws" by the Central Commission for Discipline Inspection (CCDI), the party's internal disciplinary body, and the National Supervisory Commission, the highest anti-corruption agency of China. On November 3, he was expelled from the CCP and dismissed from public office.

On 29 July 2026, Xu was sentenced to 15 years and fined 5 million yuan for taking bribes in 62.35 million yuan.

Government offices
Preceded by Zheng Maoqing	Director of Hunan Development and Reform Commission; 1998–2003	Succeeded by Chen Shuhong
