= Fan Yifei =

- 范一飞
- Born: August 1964 (age 62); Taixing County, Jiangsu, China
- Education: Renmin University of China; Columbia University
- Occupation: Banker
- Years active: 1982–2022
- Agent: People's Bank of China
- Political party: Chinese Communist Party (expelled)

Chinese name
- Simplified Chinese: 范一飞
- Traditional Chinese: 范一飛
Transcriptions
Standard Mandarin
- Hanyu Pinyin: Fàn Yīfēi

Fan Yifei (Chinese: 范一飞; born August 1964) is a former Chinese banker who served as vice governor of the People's Bank of China from 2015 to 2022. He was investigated by China's top anti-graft agency in November 2022. Fan was the first ministerial-level official in China to be targeted by China's top anticorruption watchdog since the 20th National Congress of the Chinese Communist Party in October 2022.

In June 2023, Fan was expelled from the party for bribery and abuse of power.

== Early life and education ==
In August 1964, Fan was born in Taixing County (now Taixing), Jiangsu, and graduated from the Renmin University of China. From March 2001 to October 2002, he pursued advanced studies in the United States, earning a master's degree in international economics from Columbia University.

== Career ==
Starting in July 1982, he served in several posts in the China Construction Bank, including assistant to general manager of its Trust and Investment Company, deputy director of the Capital Planning Department, general manager of the Finance and Accounting Department, and general manager of the Planning and Finance Department. He moved up the ranks to become assistant president in February 2000 and vice president in June 2005. He joined the Chinese Communist Party (CCP) in June 1991.

He was deputy general manager of the China Investment Corporation in March 2010, in addition to serving as chairman of the Bank of Shanghai since November 2011.

In February 2015, he was appointed vice governor of the People's Bank of China, a position at vice-ministerial level.

== Investigation ==
On 5 November 2022, he was put under investigation for alleged "serious violations of discipline and laws" by the Central Commission for Discipline Inspection (CCDI), the party's internal disciplinary body, and the National Supervisory Commission, the highest anti-corruption agency of China.

On 9 June 2023, Fan was expelled from the party and removed from his post. The CCDI found that Fan accepted bribes, banquets, trips, golfing, and other activity, illegally accepted property, abused his power for financing loans. Moreover, Fan had lost his ideals, resisted investigators, traded power for money, and abused his power in the appointment of officials. His illegal gains were confiscated.

On 10 October 2024 he was sentenced to death (with a two-year reprimand) for taking bribes worth over 386 million yuan.
