= Li Chunsheng (politician) =

Chinese politician

- 李春生

Vice Chairman of Guangdong Provincial People's Congress
- In office January 2021 – January 2023
- Chairman: Huang Chuping

Vice Governor of Guangdong
- In office May 2013 – January 2021
- Governor: Zhu Xiaodan; Ma Xingrui

Personal details
- Born: 5 March 1961 (age 65) Zhengzhou, Henan, China
- Party: Chinese Communist Party (1984–2023; expelled)
- Education: Henan University

Li Chunsheng (Chinese: 李春生; pinyin: Lǐ Chūnshēng; born 5 March 1961) is a former Chinese politician who spent most of his career in both Henan and Guangdong provinces. He turned himself in to the anti-corruption agency of China in December 2022. Previously he served as vice chairman of Guangdong Provincial People's Congress and before that, vice governor of Guangdong.

== Early life and education ==
Li was born in Zhengzhou, Henan, on 5 March 1961. In 1979, he was accepted to Henan University, where he majored in history. After university in 1983, he taught at Zhengzhou No. 7 High School.

== Career in Henan ==
Li joined the Chinese Communist Party (CCP) in December 1984, and began his political career in 1985, when he became an official in the Henan Provincial Committee of the Communist Youth League of China.

In 1998, he became deputy party secretary of Xin County, rising to party secretary in 2002. He also served as magistrate from 2000 to 2002. He was appointed secretary of the Political and Legal Affairs Commission of the CCP Xinyang Municipal Committee in 2003 and was admitted to member of the CCP Xinyang Municipal Committee, the city's top authority. In 2004, he was chosen as director of the Political Division of Henan Provincial Public Security Department.

== Career in central government ==
In 2006, he was director of the Personnel Training Bureau of the Political Department of the Ministry of Public Security, in addition to serving as deputy director of the Political Department since 2008.

== Career in Guangdong ==
He was transferred to southeast China' Guangdong province in 2013 and appointed vice governor, head of Guangdong Provincial Public Security, and deputy secretary of the Political and Legal Affairs Commission of the CCP Guangdong Provincial Committee. In 2021, he was made vice chairman of Guangdong Provincial People's Congress.

== Downfall ==
On 8 December 2022, he surrendered himself to the Central Commission for Discipline Inspection (CCDI), the party's internal disciplinary body, and the National Supervisory Commission, the highest anti-corruption agency of China.

On 28 June 2023, he was expelled from the CCP and dismissed from public office. On July 6, he was arrested by the Supreme People's Procuratorate. On October 24, he was indicted on suspicion of accepting bribes. On November 23, he stood trial at the Intermediate People's Court of Chenzhou on charges of taking bribes, he was accused of abusing his powers in former positions he held between 2001 and 2022 in Henan and Guangdong provinces to seek benefits for relevant organizations and individuals in enterprise operation, project promotion, engineering contracting, and job promotion, in return, he accepted 79.40 million yuan ($11 million) worth of money and valuables personally or through his family members.

On 31 July 2024, Li was sentenced to 10 years and fined 4 million yuan for taking bribes, all his illegal gains will be confiscated and handed over to the state.

Government offices
Preceded by Liang Weifa	Head of Guangdong Provincial Public Security; 2013–2021	Succeeded by Wang Zhizhong
