= Yugan County =

Yugan 余干县 Yukan; Yükan
- County
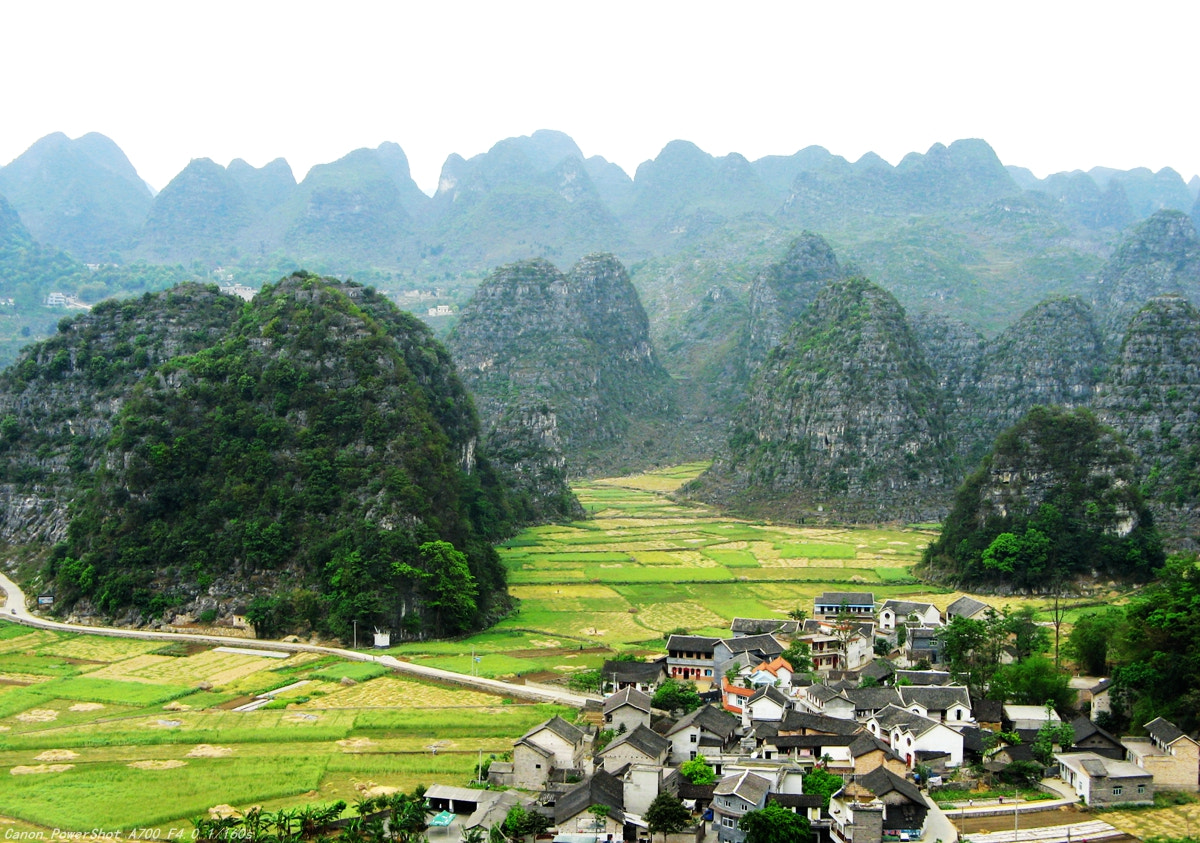

- Location in Jiangxi
- Coordinates: 28°42′07″N 116°41′46″E
- Country: People's Republic of China
- Province: Jiangxi
- Prefecture-level city: Shangrao

Area
  - Total: 2,336 km^{2} (902 sq mi)

Population (2018)
  - Total: 1,090,000
  - Density: 467/km^{2} (1,210/sq mi)
- Time zone: UTC+8 (China Standard)
- Postal Code: 335100

Yugan County (simplified Chinese: 余干县; traditional Chinese: 餘干縣; pinyin: Yúgān Xiàn) is a county in the north of Jiangxi province, People's Republic of China, containing part of the southern end of Poyang Lake. It is the westernmost county-level division of the prefecture-level city of Shangrao.

== Administrative divisions ==
At present, Yugan County has 8 towns and 12 townships.

8 towns

- Yuting (玉亭镇)
- Ruihong (瑞洪镇)
- Huangjinbu (黄金埠镇)
- Gubu (古埠镇)
- Wuni (乌泥镇)
- Shikou (石口镇)
- Yangbu (杨埠镇)
- Jiulong (九龙镇)

12 townships

- Kangshan (康山乡)
- Dongtang (东塘乡)
- Datang (大塘乡)
- Lusigang (鹭鸶港乡)
- Santang (三塘乡)
- Hongjiazui (洪家嘴乡)
- Baimaqiao (白马桥乡)
- Jiangbu (江埠乡)
- Fenggang (枫港乡)
- Daxi (大溪乡)
- Meigang (梅港乡)
- Shegeng (社赓乡)

== Demographics ==
The population of the district was 841,443 in 1999.

== Climate ==
Climate data for Yugan, elevation 21 m (69 ft), (1991–2020 normals, extremes 1981–2010)
| Month | Jan | Feb | Mar | Apr | May | Jun | Jul | Aug | Sep | Oct | Nov | Dec | Year |
|---|---|---|---|---|---|---|---|---|---|---|---|---|---|
| Record high °C (°F) | 24.8 (76.6) | 28.4 (83.1) | 32.6 (90.7) | 35.1 (95.2) | 36.1 (97.0) | 37.2 (99.0) | 40.0 (104.0) | 39.4 (102.9) | 38.4 (101.1) | 34.9 (94.8) | 31.8 (89.2) | 23.9 (75.0) | 40.0 (104.0) |
| Mean daily maximum °C (°F) | 9.6 (49.3) | 12.6 (54.7) | 16.7 (62.1) | 23.0 (73.4) | 27.7 (81.9) | 30.2 (86.4) | 34.1 (93.4) | 33.6 (92.5) | 29.9 (85.8) | 24.9 (76.8) | 18.8 (65.8) | 12.3 (54.1) | 22.8 (73.0) |
| Daily mean °C (°F) | 6.0 (42.8) | 8.7 (47.7) | 12.6 (54.7) | 18.6 (65.5) | 23.5 (74.3) | 26.3 (79.3) | 29.8 (85.6) | 29.4 (84.9) | 25.7 (78.3) | 20.2 (68.4) | 14.2 (57.6) | 8.1 (46.6) | 18.6 (65.5) |
| Mean daily minimum °C (°F) | 3.5 (38.3) | 5.8 (42.4) | 9.6 (49.3) | 15.4 (59.7) | 20.2 (68.4) | 23.5 (74.3) | 26.5 (79.7) | 26.2 (79.2) | 22.4 (72.3) | 16.8 (62.2) | 10.8 (51.4) | 5.1 (41.2) | 15.5 (59.9) |
| Record low °C (°F) | −4.3 (24.3) | −6.7 (19.9) | −0.9 (30.4) | 4.0 (39.2) | 11.4 (52.5) | 14.5 (58.1) | 19.3 (66.7) | 20.0 (68.0) | 14.0 (57.2) | 4.9 (40.8) | −0.2 (31.6) | −14.3 (6.3) | −14.3 (6.3) |
| Average precipitation mm (inches) | 92.8 (3.65) | 103.2 (4.06) | 205.5 (8.09) | 227.4 (8.95) | 229.1 (9.02) | 308.0 (12.13) | 175.8 (6.92) | 127.3 (5.01) | 62.5 (2.46) | 48.8 (1.92) | 95.2 (3.75) | 68.3 (2.69) | 1,743.9 (68.65) |
| Average precipitation days (≥ 0.1 mm) | 13.6 | 13.5 | 17.8 | 16.7 | 15.0 | 16.3 | 10.8 | 9.7 | 7.2 | 7.0 | 9.2 | 10.2 | 147 |
| Average snowy days | 2.1 | 1.3 | 0.4 | 0 | 0 | 0 | 0 | 0 | 0 | 0 | 0.1 | 0.9 | 4.8 |
| Average relative humidity (%) | 80 | 80 | 81 | 79 | 78 | 82 | 75 | 76 | 77 | 74 | 77 | 77 | 78 |
| Mean monthly sunshine hours | 84.1 | 84.3 | 92.8 | 117.3 | 139.0 | 130.3 | 223.9 | 213.4 | 183.8 | 165.5 | 133.8 | 122.2 | 1,690.4 |
| Percentage possible sunshine | 26 | 27 | 25 | 30 | 33 | 31 | 53 | 53 | 50 | 47 | 42 | 38 | 38 |
Source: China Meteorological Administration

== Issues ==
In 2017, Christian villagers living there have been asked by the Chinese government to replace religious artefacts with pictures of Chinese Communist Party general secretary Xi Jinping. It is part of a poverty relief program funded by the Chinese Communist Party (CCP). According to Christianity Today, "thousands of Christian villagers in China have been told to take down displays of Jesus, crosses, and gospel passages from their homes as part of a government propaganda effort to “transform believers in religion into believers in the party.”" It is found that some CPC members believe families’ faith is to blame for their financial woes, and the poster swaps in villagers’ homes represent the party's desire to have residents look to their leaders, rather than their Savior, for assistance. SCMP, on the other hand, compares it to "a practice that hearkens back to the era of the personality cult around late chairman Mao Zedong, whose portraits were once ubiquitous in Chinese homes."

In Huangjinbu Township, CCP cadres visited poor Christians’ homes and claimed that they had successfully "melted the hard ice in their hearts" while “transforming them from believing in religion to believing in the Party." As a result, more than 600 villagers “voluntarily” got rid of the religious texts and paintings they had in their homes while replacing them with 453 portraits of Xi.

Qi Yan, member of the People's Congress at Huangjinbu, claimed that "it [the program] focused on teaching Christian families how much the party had done to help eradicate poverty and how much concern Xi had shown for their well-being." He also claimed that "many poor households have plunged into poverty because of illness, and some resorted to believing in Jesus to cure their illnesses,” while also claiming that "the people who can really help them are the Communist Party and CCP General Secretary Xi Jinping.”

A person named Liu told to SCMP that "some villagers do not do it voluntarily", as opposed to what state media screamed. He also said that “they all have their belief and, of course, they didn’t want to take them down. But there is no way out. If they don’t agree to do so, they won’t be given their quota from the poverty-relief fund.”

Three years later, from April 18 through April 30, 2020, 48 state-owned Three Self churches in the county was shut down by the government, also part of a crackdown on Christians in China. Furthermore, it is part of a five-year plan Xi announced at 2018. According to Barnabas Fund, "in a series of repressive measures, hundreds of “three-self” churches and “house churches” (i.e. unregistered congregations) have been closed, pastors have been arrested and imprisoned and surveillance cameras installed inside churches."
