= Ji Binchang =

Chinese executive and politician

- 汲斌昌

Chairman of the Qingdao Municipal Committee of the Chinese People's Political Consultative Conference
- In office April 2022 – January 2023
- Preceded by: Yang Jun
- Succeeded by: TBA

Vice Governor of Shandong
- In office June 2020 – June 2022
- Governor: Li Ganjie; Zhou Naixiang

Personal details
- Born: November 1963 (age 62) Changyi County, Shandong, China
- Party: Chinese Communist Party (expelled; 1985–2023)
- Education: Sichuan University

Ji Binchang (Chinese: 汲斌昌; pinyin: Jí Bīnchāng; born November 1963) is a former Chinese executive and politician. He was investigated by China's top anti-graft agency in January 2023. Previously he served as chairman of the Qingdao Municipal Committee of the Chinese People's Political Consultative Conference and before that, vice governor of Shandong.

He was a representative of the 19th National Congress of the Chinese Communist Party.

== Early life and education ==
Ji was born in Changyi County (now Changyi), Shandong, in November 1963, and graduated from the Department of National Economic Management, Sichuan University in 1986.

== Political career ==
Ji joined the Chinese Communist Party (CCP) in October 1985, and began his political career in July 1986, when he was assigned to the Shandong Provincial Economic System Reform Office after university. He rose to become deputy director in September 2000.

He was deputy director of the State owned Assets Supervision and Administration Commission of Shandong Provincial People's Government in May 2004, and held that office until March 2013.

He was chairman of Shandong Luxin Investment Holding Group Co., Ltd. (山东省鲁信投资控股集团有限公司) in March, in addition to serving as party secretary.

He was director of the Shandong Provincial Economic and Information Commission in July 2018 and subsequently director of the Shandong Provincial Department of Industry and Information Technology three months later.

In June 2020, he was elevated to vice governor of Shandong, a post he kept until March 2022, when he was transferred to Qingdao and appointed chairman of the Qingdao Municipal Committee of the Chinese People's Political Consultative Conference.

== Downfall ==
On 6 January 2023, Ji has been placed under investigation for "serious violations of laws and regulations" by the Central Commission for Discipline Inspection (CCDI), the party's internal disciplinary body, and the National Supervisory Commission, the highest anti-corruption agency of China. On July 27, he was expelled from the CCP and dismissed from public office. He was detained by the Supreme People's Procuratorate on August 10.

On 16 May 2024, Ji stood trial at the Intermediate People's Court of Wuxi on charges of taking bribes. The public prosecutors accused him of abusing his multiple positions between 2003 and 2022 in Shandong to seek favor on behalf of certain organizations and individuals in business operations, project contracting and employment, in return for bribes paid in cash or gifts worth more than 526 million yuan ($72.9 million). On December 20, he was sentenced to death with a two-year reprieve for taking more than 526 million yuan ($72.07 million) in bribes at the Wuxi Intermediate People's Court. He was deprived of political rights for life and had all his personal assets confiscated.

Business positions
Preceded by Meng Fanli	Chairman of Shandong Luxin Investment Holding Group Co., Ltd. 2013–2018	Succeeded by Li Wei (李玮)
Government offices
Preceded by Qian Huantao (钱焕涛)	Director of the Shandong Provincial Economic and Information Commission; 2018	Succeeded by Position revoked
New title	Director of the Shandong Provincial Department of Industry and Information Technology; 2018–2020	Succeeded by Yu Haitian
Assembly seats
Preceded by Yang Jun	Chairman of the Qingdao Municipal Committee of the Chinese People's Political Consultative Conference; 2022–2023	Succeeded by TBA
