= Lu Kehua =

Chinese politician

- 陆克华

Secretary of the Political and Legal Affairs Commission of the Chongqing Municipal Committee of the Chinese Communist Party
- In office 10 February 2023 – 4 November 2024
- Preceded by: Li Mingqing

Executive Vice Mayor of Chongqing
- In office June 2022 – February 2023
- Mayor: Hu Henghua
- Preceded by: Li Mingqing
- Succeeded by: Chen Mingbo

Vice Minister of Housing and Urban-Rural Development
- In office March 2015 – January 2018
- Minister: Chen Zhenggao; Wang Menghui

Personal details
- Born: October 1964 (age 61–62) Zongyang County, Anhui, China
- Party: Chinese Communist Party (1984–2025; expelled)
- Education: Huazhong Agricultural University; Central Party School of the Chinese Communist Party

Chinese name
- Simplified Chinese: 陆克华
- Traditional Chinese: 陸克華
Transcriptions
Standard Mandarin
- Hanyu Pinyin: Lú Kèhuá

Lu Kehua (Chinese: 陆克华; born October 1964) is a former Chinese politician. It was announced in November 2024 that was under investigation by the Central Commission for Discipline Inspection. Previously he served as secretary of the Political and Legal Affairs Commission of the Chongqing Municipal Committee of the Chinese Communist Party, vice mayor of Chongqing and before that, vice minister of housing and urban-rural development.

He was a representative of the 19th and 20th National Congress of the Chinese Communist Party.

== Early life and education ==
Lu was born in Zongyang County, Anhui, in October 1964. In 1982, he enrolled at Huazhong Agricultural University, where he majored in land use planning and management. Lu joined the Chinese Communist Party (CCP) in November 1984 in his junior year.

== Career ==
After university in 1989, Lu was assigned to the Market Division of the Real Estate Industry Department of the Ministry of Construction (now Ministry of Housing and Urban-Rural Development). He moved up the ranks to become deputy director in May 1994 and director in July 1996. He eventually became vice minister in March 2015.

Lu was appointed vice mayor of Chongqing in January 2018 and in May 2022 was admitted to member of the CCP Chongqing Municipal Committee, the city's top authority. In February 2023, he was named secretary of the Political and Legal Affairs Commission of the CCP Chongqing Municipal Committee, succeeding Li Mingqing.

== Downfall ==
On 4 November 2024, Lu was put under investigation for alleged "serious violations of discipline and laws" by the Central Commission for Discipline Inspection (CCDI), the party's internal disciplinary body, and the National Supervisory Commission, the highest anti-corruption agency of China.

On 23 April 2025, Lu was stripped of his posts within the CCP and in the public office. On May 14, he was detained by the Supreme People's Procuratorate. On September 10, he was indicted on suspicion of accepting bribes.

On 8 May 2026, Lu was sentenced to death with a two-year reprieve for taking bribes.

Government offices
Preceded by Li Mingqing	Executive Vice Mayor of Chongqing; 2022–2023	Succeeded by Chen Mingbo
Party political offices
Preceded by Li Mingqing	Secretary of the Political and Legal Affairs Commission of the Chongqing Municipal Committee of the Chinese Communist Party; 2023–2024	Succeeded by TBA
