= Ma Fengsheng =

Chinese politician

- 马丰胜

Vice Chairman of the Qinghai Provincial Committee of the Chinese People's Political Consultative Conference
- In office February 2021 – December 2024
- Chairman: Dorje Rabdain; Gönbo Zhaxi

Personal details
- Born: April 1963 (age 63) Xunhua Salar Autonomous County, Qinghai, China
- Party: Chinese Communist Party (1985–2025; expelled)
- Education: Minzu University of China

Chinese name
- Simplified Chinese: 马丰胜
- Traditional Chinese: 馬豐勝
Transcriptions
Standard Mandarin
- Hanyu Pinyin: Mǎ Fēngshēng

Ma Fengsheng (Chinese: 马丰胜; born April 1963) is a former Chinese politician of Salar ethnicity. He was investigated by China's top anti-graft agency in December 2024. Previously he served as vice chairman of the Qinghai Provincial Committee of the Chinese People's Political Consultative Conference.

== Early life and education ==
Ma was born in Xunhua Salar Autonomous County, Qinghai, in April 1963. In 1980, he enrolled at Minzu University of China, where he majored in the Department of Political Economy.

== Career ==
After University in 1984, Ma was assigned to the Organization Department of the CCP Xunhua Salar Autonomous County Committee. Ma joined the Chinese Communist Party (CCP) in June 1985. In August 1995, he became vice magistrate of the county, rising to magistrate in March 2001.

In April 2005, Ma was promoted to become vice mayor of Haidong Prefecture, a position he held until February 2013, when he was appointed director of Qinghai Provincial Poverty Alleviation and Development Bureau.

In February 2021, Ma was chosen as vice chairman of the Qinghai Provincial Committee of the Chinese People's Political Consultative Conference, the provincial advisory body.

== Downfall ==
On 11 December 2024, Ma was placed under investigation for "serious violations of laws and regulations" by the Central Commission for Discipline Inspection (CCDI), the party's internal disciplinary body, and the National Supervisory Commission, the highest anti-corruption agency of China.

On 27 May 2025, Ma was stripped of his posts within the CCP and in the public office. On September 23, he was indicted on suspicion of accepting bribes.

On 18 March 2026, Ma was sentenced to 14 years for taking bribe in 40.56 million yuan.
