= Long Xiang =

Chinese politician

- 龙翔

Chairperson of the Nanjing Municipal People's Congress
- In office January 2018 – April 2025
- Preceded by: Chen Shaoze

Personal details
- Born: June 1963 (age 63) Nanjing, Jiangsu, China
- Party: Chinese Communist Party (1983–2025; expelled)
- Education: Henan University

Chinese name
- Simplified Chinese: 龙翔
- Traditional Chinese: 龍翔
Transcriptions
Standard Mandarin
- Hanyu Pinyin: Lóng Xiáng

Long Xiang (Chinese: 龙翔; born June 1963) is a former Chinese politician who spent his entire career in his home-city Nanjing. As of April 2025 he was under investigation by China's top anti-graft watchdog. Previously he served as chairperson of the Nanjing Municipal People's Congress.

== Early life and education ==
Long was born in Nanjing, Jiangsu, in June 1963. In 1980, he enrolled at Henan University, where he majored in Chinese language and literature. He joined the Chinese Communist Party (CCP) in January 1983 during his junior year.

== Career ==
After graduation in July 1984, Long was assigned to the Cadre Division of Henan Provincial Commission for Discipline Inspection and soon moved to the Standing Committee of the Henan Provincial People's Congress in November 1985.

Long was transferred back in Nanjing in April 1987 and despatched to the Research Office of Jiangsu Provincial Commission for Discipline Inspection, where he assumed various posts. He moved up the ranks to become deputy party secretary in November 2003 and party secretary in July 2010. In July 2010, he was also admitted to standing committee member of the CCP Nanjing Municipal Committee, the city's top authority. He concurrently served as deputy party secretary of Nanjing since December 2014 and president of the Municipal Party School since March 2015. In January 2018, he was chosen as chairperson of the Nanjing Municipal People's Congress, a position at vice-provincial level.

== Downfall ==
On 3 April 2025, Long was put under investigation for alleged "serious violations of discipline and laws" by the Central Commission for Discipline Inspection (CCDI), the party's internal disciplinary body, and the National Supervisory Commission, the highest anti-corruption agency of China. On September 28, he was stripped of his posts within the CCP and in the public office.

On 11 August 2026, Long was sentenced to death with a two-year reprieve for taking bribes in 261 million yuan.

Assembly seats
Preceded by Chen Shaoze	Chairperson of the Nanjing Municipal People's Congress; 2018–2025	Succeeded by TBA
