= Mao Chaofeng =

Chinese politician

Mao Chaofeng (Chinese: 毛超峰; born December 1965) is a Chinese politician, serving since 2015 as the executive vice governor of Hainan province. He was born in Zhecheng County, Henan province. He joined the Chinese Communist Party in 1986. He graduated from the Beijing Meteorological Institute (later merged into Nanjing University of Information Science and Technology), where he studied weather forecasting.

He worked in his earlier career for the Civil Aviation Authority of China. Then he served as mayor of Jiaozuo, then party chief of Zhoukou. In October 2011 he was named a member of the provincial Party Standing Committee of Henan province, entering sub-provincial ranks at age 45; in February 2012 Mao assumed the office of the director of the provincial Political and Legal Affairs commission. In January 2013, he was transferred to become head of the Political and Legal Affairs commission in Hainan province. In January 2015, he was named executive vice governor of Hainan.

Mao is an alternate of the 18th Central Committee of the Chinese Communist Party.
