= Li Xiangang =

Chinese politician

- 李显刚

Vice Chairperson of the Heilongjiang Provincial People's Congress
- In office January 2018 – March 2024
- Chairperson: Zhang Qingwei; Xu Qin

Personal details
- Born: February 1963 (age 63) Hanchuan, Hubei, China
- Party: Chinese Communist Party (1984–2024; expelled)
- Education: Huazhong Agricultural University; China Agricultural University; Renmin University of China; Central Party School of the Chinese Communist Party

Chinese name
- Simplified Chinese: 李显刚
- Traditional Chinese: 李顯剛
Transcriptions
Standard Mandarin
- Hanyu Pinyin: Lǐ Xiǎngāng

Li Xiangang (Chinese: 李显刚; born February 1963) is a former Chinese politician. He was investigated by China's top anti-graft agency in March 2024. Previously he served as vice chairperson of the Heilongjiang Provincial People's Congress.

== Early life and education ==
Li was born in Hanchuan, Hubei, in February 1963. After resuming the college entrance examination, in 1979, he enrolled at Huazhong Agricultural College (now Huazhong Agricultural University), where he majored in agriculture economic management. He received his master's degree in management from China Agricultural University and doctor's degree in management from the Renmin University of China in 1999 and 2015, respectively.

== Career ==
After college in 1983, he was despatched to the Ministry of Agriculture, Animal Husbandry and Fisheries (now Ministry of Agriculture and Rural Affairs), where he stayed there for 13 years and eventually becoming deputy director of the Economic Research Center. He joined the Chinese Communist Party (CCP) in December 1984.

He was deputy bureau-level secretary of the Office of the Standing Committee of the National People's Congress in July 1999 and subsequently bureau-level secretary of the Secretariat of the General Office of the CCP Central Committee in April 2000.

He was transferred to northeast China's Heilongjiang province in March 2005 and appointed deputy secretary-general of the CCP Heilongjiang Provincial Committee, the province's top authority. He served as mayor of Shuangyashan from February 2008 to December 2009, and party secretary, the top political position in the city, from December 2009 to December 2013. He concurrently served as chairperson of the Municipal People's Congress. He was secretary-general of the Heilongjiang Provincial People's Government in December 2013, and held that office until January 2018, when he was chosen as vice chairperson of the Heilongjiang Provincial People's Congress, the province's top legislative body.

== Downfall ==
On 17 March 2024, he was put under investigation for alleged "serious violations of discipline and laws" by the Central Commission for Discipline Inspection (CCDI), the party's internal disciplinary body, and the National Supervisory Commission, the highest anti-corruption agency of China. On September 11, he was stripped of his posts within the CCP and in the public office. On September 26, he was arrested by the Supreme People's Procuratorate.

On 19 February 2025, Li was indicted on suspicion of accepting bribes. On November 17, he was sentenced to life imprisonment for taking bribes and embezzlement, and was deprived of political rights for life and all his properties were also confiscated.

Government offices
Preceded by Teng Xikui (滕喜魁)	Mayor of Shuangyashan; 2008–2009	Succeeded by Wu Fengcheng (武凤呈)
Preceded by ?	Secretary-General of the Heilongjiang Provincial People's Government; 2013–2018	Succeeded by Wang Dongguang
Party political offices
Preceded by Teng Xikui (滕喜魁)	Communist Party Secretary of Shuangyashan; 2009–2013	Succeeded by Wu Fengcheng (武凤呈)
