= Sun Shutao =

Chinese politician (born 1965)

- 孙述涛

Vice Chairman of the Shandong Provincial Committee of the Chinese People's Political Consultative Conference
- In office January 2023 – March 2023
- Chairwoman: Ge Huijun

Personal details
- Born: January 1965 (age 61) Gaomi, Shandong, China
- Party: Chinese Communist Party (1985–2023; expelled)
- Education: Shandong Agricultural University; Nanjing Forestry University; Central Party School of the Chinese Communist Party

Chinese name
- Simplified Chinese: 孙述涛
- Traditional Chinese: 孫述濤
Transcriptions
Standard Mandarin
- Hanyu Pinyin: Sūn Shùtāo

Sun Shutao (Chinese: 孙述涛; born January 1965) is a former Chinese politician who spent his entire career in north China's Shandong province. As of March 2023 he was under investigation by China's top anti-corruption agency. Previously he served as vice chairman of the Shandong Provincial Committee of the Chinese People's Political Consultative Conference.

He was a representative of the 19th National Congress of the Chinese Communist Party.

== Early life and education ==
Sun was born in Gaomi, Shandong, in January 1965. In 1983, he entered Shandong Agricultural University, where he majored in forestry. He joined the Chinese Communist Party (CCP) in November 1985, when he was a sophomore. He worked at the university after graduation. He went on to receive his master's degree and doctor's degree from Nanjing Forestry University in 1994 and 1997, respectively. After obtaining degrees, he continued to teach at Shandong Agricultural University.

== Career ==
Sun got involved in politics in January 2001, when he was appointed vice mayor of Heze, but having held the position for only a month.

He was deputy head of the Organization Department of the CCP Shandong Provincial Committee in February 2001, concurrently serving as president of Shandong Provincial Cadre College since July 2007.

In February 2008, he was named acting mayor of Weihai, confirmed in July of that same year. He was party secretary, the top political position in the city, in December 2011, in addition to serving as chairman of Weihai Municipal People's Congress and president of the Party School.

Sun was elevated to vice governor of Shandong on January 31, 2018. On May 11, he was made deputy party secretary of Ji'nan. He also served as mayor since June 2018.

In January 2023, he was chosen as vice chairman of the Shandong Provincial Committee of the Chinese People's Political Consultative Conference, the provincial advisory body.

== Downfall ==
On March 28, 2023, Sun was put under investigation for alleged "serious violations of discipline and laws" by the Central Commission for Discipline Inspection (CCDI), the party's internal disciplinary body, and the National Supervisory Commission, the highest anti-corruption agency of China. On October 9, he was expelled from the CCP and removed from public office. On October 25, he was arrested by the Supreme People's Procuratorate.

On 20 February 2024, Sun was indicted on suspicion of accepting bribes. On April 11, he stood trial at the Intermediate People's Court of Datong on charges of taking bribes, prosecutors accused him of taking advantage of his different positions in Shandong between 2001 and 2023 to seek profits for various companies and individuals in enterprise operation, business undertaking, and job adjustment, in return, he accepted money and gifts worth more than 129 million yuan ($17.97 million) either directly or from other connections. On June 5, he was sentenced to life imprisonment for accepting bribes, he was deprived of his political rights for life, and all his personal assets were confiscated.

Government offices
Preceded by Wang Peiting	Mayor of Weihai; 2008–2011	Succeeded by Zhang Hui
Preceded by Wang Zhonglin	Mayor of Ji'nan; 2018–2022	Succeeded by Yu Haitian
Party political offices
Preceded by Wang Peiting	Communist Party Secretary of Weihai; 2011–2018	Succeeded by Wang Luming
