= Guo Yuanqiang =

Chinese politician

- 郭元强
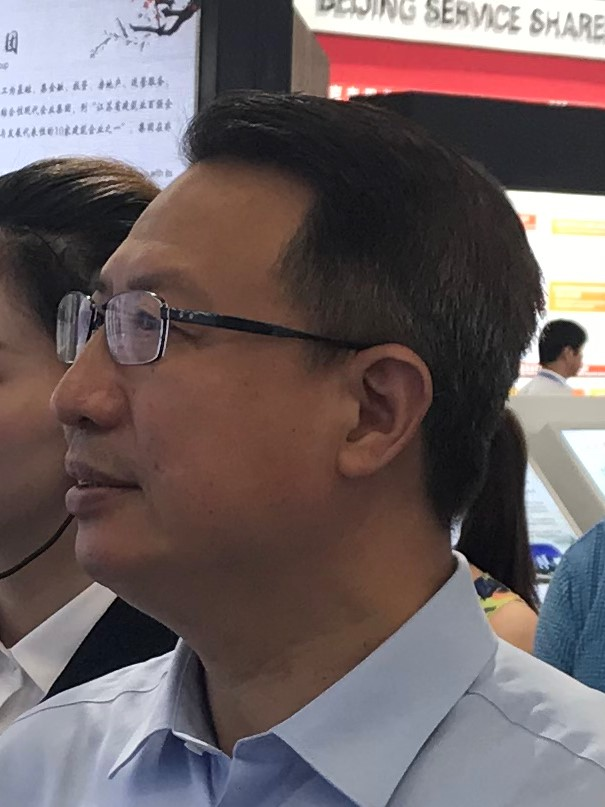
- Guo in 2019

Party Secretary of Wuhan
- In office 29 September 2021 – 18 October 2025
- Deputy: Cheng Yongwen (mayor)
- Preceded by: Wang Zhonglin

Personal details
- Born: July 1965 (age 61) Guangshan County, Henan, China
- Party: Chinese Communist Party
- Education: Central China Normal University

Chinese name
- Simplified Chinese: 郭元强
- Traditional Chinese: 郭元強
Transcriptions
Standard Mandarin
- Hanyu Pinyin: Guō Yuánqiáng

Guo Yuanqiang (Chinese: 郭元强; born July 1965) is a Chinese politician who was the party secretary of Wuhan from September 2021 to October 2025. He is a representative of the 19th National Congress of the Chinese Communist Party and was a member of the 12th National Committee of the Chinese People's Political Consultative Conference.

== Early life and education ==
Guo was born in Guangshan County, Henan, in July 1965. In 1984, he was admitted to Central China Normal University, where he majored in chemistry. He joined the Chinese Communist Party (CCP) in June 1986.

== Academic career ==
After graduating in 1988, he joined the faculty of Guangxi Agricultural College (now Guangxi Agricultural University). He began graduate work at the Guangzhou Institute of Chemistry, Chinese Academy of Sciences in 1990 and earned his master's degree in 1993. In July 1993, he was hired as an engineer at the Guangdong Petrochemical Import and Export Trade Company. In October 1996, he entered the Guangzhou Institute of Chemistry, Chinese Academy of Sciences, where he successively worked as an assistant researcher, associate researcher, and researcher.

== Career in Guangdong ==
Guo began his political career in August 2003, when he was appointed deputy director of Guangdong Provincial Quality Supervision Bureau. In July 2008, he became vice mayor of Maoming, party secretary of Gaozhou and chairman of Gaozhou Municipal People's Congress. He became director and party branch secretary of Guangdong Provincial Department of Foreign Trade and Economic Cooperation in March 2012, which was reshuffled as Guangdong Provincial Department of Commerce in December 2013. In March 2016, he was transferred to the coastal city Zhuhai and appointed party secretary and chairman of Zhuhai Municipal People's Congress. His predecessor Li Jia was placed under investigation by the Central Commission for Discipline Inspection, the party's internal disciplinary body, for "serious violations of regulations".

== Career in Jiangsu ==
In January 2018, he was transferred to east China's Jiangsu province and appointed vice governor. In October 2019, he became secretary general of CCP Jiangsu Provincial Committee and party secretary of Jiangsu Provincial Organ Working Committee, and was admitted to member of the standing committee of the CCP Jiangsu Provincial Committee, the province's top authority. He concurrently served as head of Organization Department of CCP Jiangsu Provincial Committee and president of Jiangsu Party School of the CCP since February 2021.

== Career in Hubei ==
In September 2021, he was dispatched to central China's Hubei province, where he was named party chief of Wuhan, his first foray into a regional leadership role. The position has been vacant for five months since Wang Zhonglin was promoted to governor of Hubei.

Government offices
Preceded by Liang Yaowen	Director of Guangdong Provincial Department of Foreign Trade and Economic Cooperation; 2012–2013	Succeeded by Position revoked
New title	Director of Guangdong Provincial Department of Commerce; 2013–2016	Succeeded by Zheng Jianrong
Party political offices
Preceded by Li Jia	Party Secretary of Zhuhai; 2016–2018	Succeeded by Guo Yonghang
Preceded by Fan Jinlong	Secretary General of CPC Jiangsu Provincial Committee; 2019–2021	Succeeded by Zhao Shiyong
Preceded by Guo Wenqi	Head of Organization Department of CPC Jiangsu Provincial Committee; 2021–2021	Succeeded by TBA
Preceded by Wang Zhonglin	Party Secretary of Wuhan; 2021–present	Incumbent
