= Minister of Housing and Urban–Rural Development =

Minister of the People's Republic of China

Minister of Housing and Urban–Rural Development of the People's Republic of China
- 中华人民共和国住房和城乡建设部部长
- National Emblem of China

- Flag of China

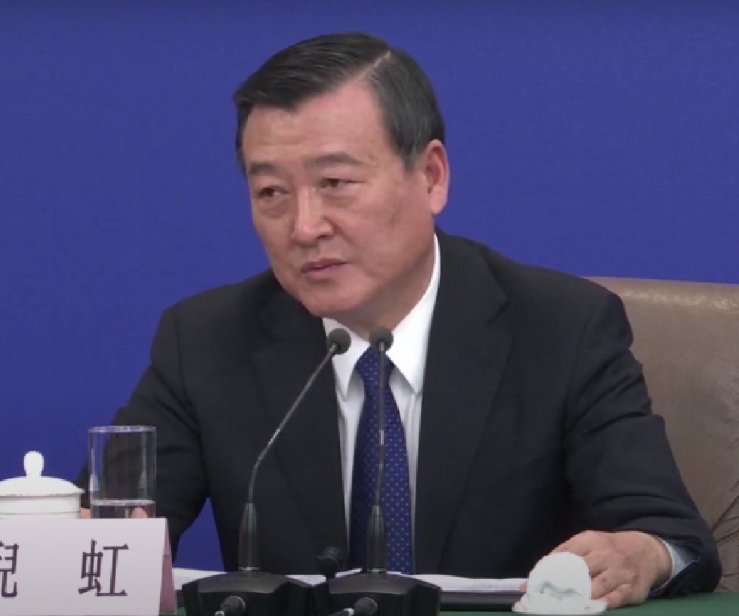
- Incumbent; Ni Hong since 29 April 2020
- Ministry of Housing and Urban–Rural Development
- Status: Provincial and ministerial-level official
- Member of: Plenary Meeting of the State Council
- Seat: Ministry of Housing and Urban–Rural Development Building, Haidian District, Beijing
- Nominator: Premier (chosen within the Chinese Communist Party)
- Appointer: President with the confirmation of the National People's Congress or its Standing Committee
- Formation: April 1988; 38 years ago
- First holder: Lin Hanxiong
- Deputy: Vice Minister of Housing and Urban–Rural Development

The minister of housing and urban–rural development of the People's Republic of China is the head of the Ministry of Housing and Urban–Rural Development of the People's Republic of China and a member of the State Council. Within the State Council, the position is sixteenth in order of precedence. The minister is responsible for leading the ministry, presiding over its meetings, and signing important documents related to the ministry. Officially, the minister is nominated by the premier of the State Council, who is then approved by the National People's Congress or its Standing Committee and appointed by the president.

The current minister is Ni Hong, who concurrently serves as the Chinese Communist Party Committee Secretary of the ministry.

== List of ministers ==
No.	Name	Took office	Left office	Ref.
Minister of Urban and Rural Construction and Environmental Protection
1	Li Ximing	1983	1984	
2	Rui Xingwen	1984	1985	
3	Ye Rutang	1985	1988	
Minister of Construction
1	Lin Hanxiong (林汉雄)	April 1988	March 1991	
2	Hou Jie	March 1991	March 1998	
3	Yu Zhengsheng	March 1998	November 2001	
4	Wang Guangtao	November 2001	March 2008	
Minister of Housing and Urban–Rural Development
1	Jiang Weixin	March 2008	June 2014	
2	Chen Zhenggao	June 2014	June 2017	
3	Wang Menghui	June 2017	March 2022	
4	Ni Hong	June 2022	Incumbent	
