= Ni Hong =

Ni Hong, may refer to:

- Ni Hong (fencer), Chinese fencer
- Ni Hong (politician), Chinese politician and the current Minister of Housing and Urban-Rural Development.

== See also ==
- Hong ni, a type of red clay
