= Chenghua =

Chenghua may refer to:

- Chenghua Emperor, Chinese emperor of the Ming dynasty.
- Chenghua District, district in Chengdu, Sichuan, China.
- Chenghua University, former university in Chengdu.
