= Hubei delegation to the National People's Congress =

Hubei Delegation to the National People's Congress
- 全国人民代表大会湖北省代表团
- Delegation for the National People's Congress
- Map showing the location of Hubei Province
- Electoral unit: Hubei Province
- Population: 57,752,557

Current Delegation
- Created: 1954
- Seats: 113
- Head of delegation: Wang Menghui
- Provincial People's Congress: Hubei Provincial People's Congress

The Hubei delegation to the National People's Congress is a delegation composed of deputies representing Hubei Province within the National People's Congress (NPC), the supreme organ of state power of the People's Republic of China. NPC deputies from the Hubei Province are officially elected by the Hubei Provincial People's Congress.

== List of deputies ==
Year	NPC sessions	Deputies	Number of deputies	Ref.
1954	1st	Wang Shusheng, Wang Tao, Zhu Junyun, Wu Defeng, Li Wenyi, Li Siguang, Li Xiannian, Li Xiping, Li Shucheng, Li Fanyi, Zhou Xiaoyan, Hu Keshi, Tu Changwang, Yuan Muzhi, Zhang Zhiyi, Zhang Nanxian, Zhang Tixue, Cao Yu, Mei Gongbin, Chen Shunying, Chen Xuzong, Tang Yongtong, Yang Gang, Yang Xianzheng, Dong Biwu, Xiong Jinhuai, Liu Jianxun, Cai Yitian, Deng Yuzhi, Xue Yu, Dai Fanglan, Nie Guoqing, Rao Xingli: By-election on June 15, 1956: Liu Xiyuan		
1959	2nd	Wang Quanhuang, Wang Tao, Wang Jiaji, Deng Zihui, Deng Yuzhi (female), Tian Embo, Liu Xiyuan, Liu Jin, Zhu Zaodi (female), Zhu Guoyun (female), Song Yiping, Li Wenyi (female), Li Siguang, Li Dongqing (female), Li Da, Li Xiannian, Li Guowei, Li Fanyi, Li Shucheng, Chen Li, Chen Jingshe, Yu Yi'an, Guan Musheng, Zhang Tixue, Zhang Nanxian, Zhou Xiaoyan (female), Zhou Zhongying, Hu Xikui, Tu Changwang, Tang Wuyuan, Tang Dihua (female), Xia Yikun, Xia Jianbai, Cao Yu, Mei Gongbin, Tang Yongtong, Peng Yangqin, Huang Xuzhou, Huang Songling, Jia Lian (female), Yang Xianzhen, Yang Dezhong, Dong Biwu, Xiong Zimin, Bao Ding, Dai Fanglan, Sa Benxin, Rao Xingli		
1964	3rd	Yu Guangyuan, Ma Xueli, Fang Zhuangyou, Wang Zhizhuo, Wang Yuzhen, Wang Quanhuang, Wang Zhuxi, Wang Zhiliang, Wang Baoying, Wang Changyan, Wang Chengshu, Wang Du, Wang Tao, Wang Jiaji, Deng Zihui, Deng Xiang, Deng Yuzhi, Feng Jian, Feng Weihua, Ye Zaiyuan, Ye Junjian, Tian Embo, Tang Peisong, Liu Jin, Liu Shuhe, Liu Junfeng, Liu Gancai, Liu Huinong, Xu Daoqi, Lü Fuhua, Zhu Rufan, Zhu Guangya, Zhu Zaodi, Ren Zuxiong, Sun Zhaoxiong, Shen Kechang, Song Yiping, Xin Zhiying, Yan Wenjing, Yan Tiesheng, Li Renlin, Li Wenyi, Li Fengen, Li Shucheng, Li Siguang, Li Dongqing, Li Da, Li Xiannian, Li Fanyi, Li Maoshun Li Guowei, Li Minghao, Li Zhennan, Yang Shuzu, Yang Shugen, Yang Xiansu, Yang Shanji, Wu Zhimei, Yu Chuanbin, Yu Yi'an, He Lanjie, He Huanfen, Zhang Shuihua, Zhang Guangnian, Zhang Shifu, Zhang Tixue, Zhang Qian, Zhang Nanxian, Chen Yongling, Chen Huagui, Chen Xiushan, Chen Bohua, Chen Zongding, Chen Maoli, Chen Jingyu, Chen Huangmei, Yi Zhongying, Jin Zhaodian, Ji Jie, Zhou Xiaoyan, Zhou Zhongying, Zhou Yongzeng, Zhu Bingheng, Zhao Benyin, Hu Zhongzi, Hu Jinkui, Hu Hengshan, Zha Qian, Duan Wenlan, Hou Tingren, Rao Xingli, Yao Yongzheng, Gao Xinrong, Jia Lian, Xia Yikun, Xia Jianbai, Xia Juhua, Gu Zhenchao, Qian Ying, Liang YanbinXiao Hongqi, Mei Gongbin, Cao Huaqing, Cao Yu, Cao Dehua, Zeng Xianjiu, Peng Kaixi, Peng Yangqin, Huang Cunzheng, Huang Xuzhou, Huang Shouren, Huang Jie, Huang Songling, Huang Guoguang, Huang Zhongxue, Huang Haiming, Jiang Dajing, Dong Biwu, Dong Fucai, Fu Xinggui, Zhan Jianfeng, Bao Ding, Liao Juren, Xiong Zimin, Xiong Quanmo, Dai Fanglan		
1975	4th	Ding Fengying, Wan Shurong, Ma Xueli, Wang Hanchi, Wang Quanliang, Wang Xusen, Wang Xianke, Wang Xueyuan, Wang Feng, Fang Zhenying, Ye Xianli, Cheng Zude, Zhu Yekui, Zhu Hongxia, Liu Yuanxiang, Liu Changshun, Liu Weide, Liu Jin, Du Rongjie, Li Youhua, Li Guangyu, Li Xiannian, Li Xiangqian, Li Guoping, Li Shuyun, Yang Dongyun, Yang Mingcong, Yang Zugao, Yang Daoan, Xiao Yuanxiang, Xiao Wuquan, Xin Zhiying, Wang Xiulan, Song Xiaohei, Song Kanfu, Zhang Shuiquan, Zhang Yongxue, Zhang Liguo, Lin Yi Shan, Luo Hengqing, Jin Chengxi, Jin Qiongyi, Zhou Yongzeng, Xiang Guanfu, Zhao Xinchu, Zhao Xiu, Hu Baoling, Hu Hengshan, Hu Dezhen, Rao Bin, Jiang Yi, Yuan Huawen, Jia Licheng, Xia Juhua, Xia Qingjian, Gao Yutian, Gao Xiuqin, Guo Yanjian, Tao Shuzeng, Huang Xianyou, Huang Dezhong, Zhang Xiaoqing, Shang Shuhua, Kou Jinchang, Peng Jieru, Peng Changsong, Dong Biwu, Han Ningfu, Qin Xiangguan, Fu Dazhi, Fu Ronghua, Qiu Fazhu, Qi Fuying, Tan Nenghua, Xiong Guixiang, Pan Guangsheng, Dai Nengpeng		
1978	5th	Wan Shurong, Ma Chengcheng, Ma Deji, Wang Zhizhuo, Wang Xinyuan, Wang Yuzhen, Wang Yongsan, Wang Xusen, Wang Xianke, Wang Zhihuai, Wang Xueyuan, Wang Jiaoyi, Wang Guilin, Ye Mei, Feng Fuying, Lü Aizhen, Lü Jilin, Zhu Yekui, Ren Zuxiong, Hua Yuqing, Liu Yuanxiang, Liu Changshun, Liu Shuhe, Liu Min, Liu Weide, Liu Huinong, Jiangxi Zhi, Li Youhua, Li Yulan, Li Li, Li Xiannian, Li Zixin, Li Quansheng, Li Guoping, Li Juemin, Li Shuyun, Yang Jiudong, Yang Kaifu, Yang Minghua, Yang Mingcong, Yang Daoan, Wu Yuqin, Wu Xuerong, Qiu Hongqi, Yu Chuanbin, Yu Mingsheng, Xin Zhiying, Wang Xiulan, Zhang Shuiquan, Zhang Yongxue, Zhang Xiu Long, Zhang Mingquan, Zhang Chunlin, Zhang Lanian, Lu Jianxun, Chen Zhengkuan, Chen Pixian, Chen Chuanying, Chen Huagui, Chen Zeming, Chen Zongji, Fan Zhongzhi, Fan Yubiao, Lin Yishan, Luo Changrong, Jin Chengxi, Zhao Congzhao, Zhao Xinchu, Hu Jinkui, Hu Yanju, Hu Baoling, Hu Hengshan, Hou Kaiqun, Rao Bin, Yuan Dechang, Gui Shicheng, Xia Yikun, Xia Juhua, Gu Dachun, Xu Boxun, Xu Guohua, Gao Yutian, Gao Xiuqin, Gao Minzhi, Huang Fengzhen, Huang Yongkai, Huang Dezhong, Cao Hongxun, Zhang Xiaoqing, Zhang Wencai, Peng Zhizhong, Peng Changsong, Dong Laishuang, Han Ningfu, Qin Xiangguan, Cheng Shuyuan, Fu Dazhi, Fu Fusheng, Shu Xiwang, Qiu FazhuCai Zongfeng, Cai Yiquan, Tan Nenghua, Xiong Zimin, Xiong Chuanjin, Xiong Guixiang, Wei Shangliang		
1983	6th	Ma Shengkui, Ma Weiqing, Wang Zhizhuo, Wang Wenkuan, Wang Zhaoguo, Wang Xujing, Wang Yuxing, Wang Xianyu, Wang Zhihuai, Wang Meiling, Wang Meichan, Wang Bingnan, Wang Genchang, Wang Kuanzhong, Wang Cuilan, Niu Yiqun, Fang Ziyun, Ji Zhixun, Shi Bixiao, Long Xianling, Tian Yongcai, Tian Shouyan, Zhu Bangjun, Xiang Yanhuai, Xiang Shiming, Xiang Jichang, Liu Shuhe, Jiang Xingfeng, Xu Guangqi, Xu Houze, Ji Zhuoru, Su Xianqin, Li Cai, Li Xiaozhen, Li Xiannian, Li Qifan, Li Guoping, Li Juemin, Li Jiahong, Li Jiaxian, Li Chonghuai, Yang Xiaoyun, Yang Baokun, Wu Guanzheng, Yu Yonglan, Song Yiping, Zhang Zhengming, Zhang Guangming, Zhang Guangting, Zhang Zhongmin Zhang Yuquan, Zhang Kongling, Zhang Deguang, Zhang Defang, Zhang Derun, Chen Pixian, Chen Chuanying, Chen Huagui, Chen Zhongxin, Chen Binglin, Chen Zeming, Chen Baoxia, Chen Zongji, Chen Yiyu, Chen Qinglian, Lin Yishan, Lin Musen, Lin Shaonan, Luo Wujin, Zhou Zhizhong, Xiang Shixiao, Zhao Changyu, Zhao Zisen, Hao Wentao, Hao Fengwu, Hu Jiuming, Hu Heyan, Hu Huiling, Yao Funian, Yao Lei, He Guihua, Xia Yikun, Xia Juhua, Xia Wenshu, Gu Dachun, Ni Xinxi, Xu Chi, Xu Binglan, Gao Bingyan, Tang Xiaomei, Tu Jiantang, Huang Hantao, Huang Yongkai, Huang Zhizhen, Huang Chun'e, Huang Lingxiang, Cao Hongxun, Cao Yu, Zhang Wencai, Liang ShufenPeng Zhizhong, Han Ningfu, Han Aiping, Zeng Biying, Wen Ruisheng, Xie Ziqun, Qiu Fazhu, Guan Hanping, Xiong Chuanjin, Pan Yuanzhang, Pan Jiacheng, Wei Junhong		
1988	7th	Ding Taoming, Wan Chiming, Wang Huaqin, Wang Hailin, Mao Lizhen, Yin Chengfu, Yin Guangxian, Yi Tizhen, Deng Zeshun, Tian Shouyan, Tian Ying, Lü Keke, Lü Chengyan, Zhu Tongbing, Ren Zhonglin, Hua Xudong, Xiang Xinran, Wu Dulin, Liu Shuhe, Liu Shuwei, Liu Yuxing, Jiang Zexi, An Kai, Xu Houze, Xu Jihuang, Du Shike, Li Yufang, Li Qifan, Li Guochu, Li Jun, Li Jiaxian, Li Chonghuai, Li Huixuan, Li Daojun, Li Song, Yang Haozhong, Yang Baokun, Wu Huapin, Wu Huaien, Wu Aidi, Qiu Gongyuan, He Huanfen, Min Guiyu, Shen Kechang, Song Yiping, Song Yinbin, Zhang Zhenglin, Zhang Guangming, Zhang Kongling, Zhang Honglun, Zhang Hong Xiang, Chen Daming, Chen Shuiwen, Chen Shiqiang, Chen Guangrong, Chen Zhonghua, Chen Qifa, Chen Zongji, Chen Yiyu, Chen Qing, Chen Cixuan, Lin Shangyuan, Lin Hanxiong, Lin Jinming, Luo Gongliang, Luo Lilan, Luo Qingquan, Zhou Xinchao, Zhou Shiji, Zhou Chuanren, Zhou Hongren, Zhou Baosheng, Zhou Taohua, Zhou Jiaming, Zhou Langxi, Zheng Darong, Zheng Meiyun, Meng Chuanxiu, Zhao Qinghua, Zhao Baojiang, Zhao Zisen, Zhao Pengda, Hao Yichun, Hu Chuanzhi, Hu Keshi, Hu Changmin, Hu Enxia, Hu Jiayou, Yao Guang, Yao Shaobin, Xia Juhua, Qian Mai, Qian Dai, Xu Linmao, Xu Zhaodong, Guo Liwen, Guo Zhenqian, Tang Xiaohe, Huang Zhizhen, Cao Guanzhong, Gong Wenxiang,Zhang Zhiwen, Liang Shufen, Peng Yingming, Dong Leshan, Han Aiping, Zeng Diping, Zeng Xiangfen, Qiu Fazhu, Qi Lin, Xiong Yuanzhu, Pan Jiacheng, Dai Weixin		
1993	8th	Wan Chiming, Ma Jinkui, Ma Yue, Wang Zijian, Wang Hanzhang, Wang Aifang, Wang Min, Mao Dongsheng, Wen Guanghui, Yin Guangxian, Yi Tizhen, Shen Meijun, Tian Hongxian, Tian Qiyu, Tian Zhenya, Kuang Anxiang, Feng Jie, Feng Mengya, Lü Keke, Lü Bingchuan, Hui Liangyu, Xiang Xingping, Quan Meihua, Liu Benren, Liu Napeng, Liu Heshun, Liu Duqing, Liu Jiadong, Qi Minyou, Jiang Zexi, Jiang Rongsheng, An Ming, Xu Houze, Xu Yunrong, Xu Jihuang, Su Xiaoyun, Li Dakai, Li Hongmei, Li Qifan, Li Changlu, Li Chonghuai, Li Xu'e, Li Daojun, Li Xingui, Yang Fengling, Yang Baokun, Wu Fayu, Wu Chuanying, Wu Jianning, Wu Jianguo, He Huan Fen, Yu Xiaoyu, Shen Kechang, Zhang Wanhua, Zhang Yixia, Zhang Zhenglin, Zhang Guangming, Zhang Shou, Zhang Rongguo, Zhang Daoheng, Chen Yiyi, Chen Yifang, Chen Zhenzhong, Chen Jiajie, Chen Yuenan, Chen Zhizhou, Chen Cixuan, Lin Shangyuan, Lin Jinming, Luo Lilan, Luo Qingquan, Jin Hairun, Zhou Dabing, Zhou Zuoliang, Zhou Baosheng, Zheng Yanshan, Zhao Yonglan, Zhao Baojiang, Zhao Zisen, Hao Yichun, Hu Changmin, Yao Shaobin, He Guanghui, Yuan Zhongyou, Jia Tianzeng, Jia Huaying, Xia Juhua, Ni Zhifu, Xu Linmao, Xu Penghang, Weng Xingde, Guo Shuyan, Tang Xiaohe, Ji Jianqiang, Huang Ziqiang, Huang Yicheng, Qi Yuanjing, Gong Wenxiang, Liang Shufen, Qin Lirong,Zeng Xiaomao, Zeng Shimin, Zeng Xianwu, Xie Yuefeng, Zhan Bingyan, Zhan Daosheng, Cai Ailing, Tan Gongyan, Xiong Yuanzhu, Miao Helin, Miao Shun, Cao Sanyong, Wei Tingjun		
1998	9th	Wan Anpei, Ma Jinkui, Ma Ronghua, Ma Xiaoling (Hui), Ma Yue, Wang Ping, Wang Shouhai, Wang Li, Wang Hengjun, Wang Liangren, Wang Zehong, Wang Jianqun, Mao Kechun, Mao Dongsheng, Wen Chang'e, Fang Zhengjie, Ji Bihua, Deng Guozheng, Ye Changbao, Tian Yuke (Tujia), Si Jiuyi, Zhu Zuoyan, Zhu Liyang, Ren Shimao, Xiang Mingzhu, Liu Youfan, Liu Benren, Liu Yanping, Liu Heng, Liu Enxue, Liu Jiadong, Liu Yinchang (Tujia), Liu Peng, Guan Guangfu (Manchu) (Ethnic minorities), Jiang Zexi, Chi Li, Xu Liwei, Sun Youyuan, Sun Zhigang, Sun Changsong, Ji Bentao, Hua Luxen, Su Xiaoyun (Tujia ethnic group), Su Yan, Du Yunsheng, Li Dakai, Li Guojin, Li Minggui, Li Yan, Li Zongqi, Li Xu'e, Wu Yi, Wu Mianjian, Yu Fengsheng, Yu Xiaoyu, Wang Dingguo, Zhang Shiduan, Zhang Lewen, Zhang Yongzheng, Zhang Shou, Zhang Guoguang, Zhang Chang'er, Zhang Rongguo, Zhang Binghui, Zhang Furong, Zhang Xin'an, Lu Youmei, Chen Yiyi, Chen Shengjun (Tujia ethnic group) Chen Dongzhi, Chen Lizhou, Chen Mingjie, Chen Yong, Chen Xiaolin, Chen Zhizhou, Chen Xin, Shao Shuren, Lin Shangyuan, Lin Zongshou, Ming Yuncheng, Luo Riyan, Zhou Xingren, Zhou Xiufen, Zhou Zuoliang, Zhou Baosheng, Zhou Ji, Meng Jinling, Zhao Ge, Zhao Shuanggui, Zhao Di, Zhao Yongqiu, Hu Changmin, Hou Jiechang, Hong Kezhu, Yao Shaobin (Miao), Jia Zhijie, Xia Juhua, Weng Xingde, Guo Daxiao (Tujia)Guo Shenglian, Guo Zhongfan, Guo Qingyuan, Tao Wucheng, Tao Siju, Ji Jianqiang (Hui), Huang Liming, Gong Xialing, Yan Zengfu, Liang Jianguo, Peng Yong, Jiang Changzhong, Jiang Zhuping, Cheng Yaokun, Tong Huijuan, Tong Daoyou, You Ancai, Xie Shengming, Yan Xianfeng, Lei Xinquan, Jian Qun (Tujia), Bao Longqing, Cai Fangbo, Tan Gongyan, Xiong Tongfa, Xiong Jiazhen, Miao Shun, Dai Lili		
2003	10th	Ma Ronghua, Ma Qingming, Wang Yue'e (female), Wang Liming, Wang Hengjun (female), Wang Zehong, Wang Shaoling (female), Wang Zhenyou, Wang Xingang, Qiu Xiaole, Ye Qing, Ye Changbao, Ye Jintang, Tian Yuke (female, Tujia), Fu Mingzhu, Feng Zhigao, Si Jiuyi, Lü Zhongmei (female), Zhu Dixiong, Zhu Chunxuan (Tujia), Zhu Jiaxin, Xiang Li (female, Tujia), Wu Kunhua, Liu Weidong, Liu Danli (female), Liu Benren, Liu Guoben, Liu Yuezhen, Liu Shanqiao, Liu Daoming, Liu Xihan, Liu Peng, Liu Dechun (Tujia), Chi Li (female), Xu Kezhen, Sun Kailin, Sun Youyuan, Sun Jinlong, Su Yan (female), Li Dahong, Li Bing, Li Zongbai, Li Yin (female), Li Xiansheng, Yang Yunyan, Yang Yongliang, Yang Xianlong, Xiao Xu Ming, Wu Shaoxun, Wu Dangsheng, Wu Jiayou, Qiu Sisheng, He Yehui (female), Yu Changfu, Ying Daiming, Xin Xiyu (female), Wang Dingguo, Wang Aiqun, Zhang Xuezhi, Zhang Rongguo, Zhang Haipeng, Zhang Furong, Chen Tianhui, Chen Mingjie, Chen Yong, Chen Xiaoyan (female, Tujia), Chen Dingchang, Chen Zhizhou (female), Miao Wei, Lin Zongshou, Luo Qingquan, Luo Hui, Yue Yong, Zhou Lizheng (female), Zhou Xianwang (Tujia), Zhou Baosheng, Zhou Jianyuan (female), Zhou Hongyu, Zhou Jiagui, Zheng Xinsui, Meng Jinling, Zhao Fasuo, Zhao Di (female), Zhao Yongqiu (female), Zhao Chunsheng, Zhao Ling (female), Yu Zhengsheng, Yu Xuefeng, Hong Kezhu, Zhu Jinshui, Yao Shaobin (Miao), He Keng, Qin Shunquan, Jia Zhijie, Xia Juhua (female), Gu Hailiang, Gao Ling(Female), Guo Shenglian, Guo Yuemei (female), Tao Siju, Ji Jianqiang (Hui), Huang Yongsheng, Cao Wenxuan, Gong Xialing (female), Kang Yongsheng, Zhang Zhian, Peng Zhijian, Peng Zhenkun (Tujia), Peng Fuchun, Jiang Zhuping, You Ancai, Xie Shengming, Jin Jun, Lei Shengxiang, Lu Gang, Bao Longqing, Cai Qihua (female), Cai Kun, Tan Gongyan, Tan Huizai (Tujia), Fan Mingwu, Dai Lili (female), Dai Maorong (female)		
2008	11th	Ding Kemei (female), Bu Fangying (female), Ma Guofu, Wang Yue'e (female), Wang Wentong, Wang Yufen (female), Wang Liming, Wang Jinchu (female), Wang Jianming, Wang Ling (female), Wang Tao, Wang Xiangxi, Wang Jing (female), Mao Zongfu, Qiu Xiaole, Deng Xiuxin, Deng Qilin, Ye Qing, Ye Changbao, Tian Yuke (female, Tujia), Feng Zhigao, Lü Zhongmei (female), Zhu Hanqiao, Zhu Dixiong, Zhu Jianhua, Ren Jianguo, Liu Danli (female), Liu Shunni (female), Liu Xuerong, Liu Daoming, Liu Xihan, Chi Li (female), Tang Wenquan, Xu Jianmin, Ruan Chengfa, Sun Youyuan, Sun Ying'an, Li Chuanqing, Li Hongyun, Li Hongjin (female), Li Huaizhen, Li Guozhang, Li Yin (female), Li Xiansheng, Li Peigen, Li Hongzhong, Li Pan, Yang Yunyan, Yang Yongliang Yang Xianlong, Yang Zezhu, Yang Wei, Yang Jixue, Xiao Hongjuan (female), Wu Shaoxun, Wu Xiufeng (female), Wu Hengquan, He Shaoling (female), Yu Zhuomin, Xin Xiyu (female), Wang Aiqun, Zhang Zhaoping, Zhang Baiqing, Zhang Xiaoshan, Zhang Aiguo, Zhang Qiong (female, Tujia), Zhang Furong, Zhang Jing (female), Chen Yilong, Chen Tianhui, Chen Jixue, Chen Yong, Chen Xiaoyan (female, Tujia), Chen Dingchang, Miao Wei, Fan Ruiping, Luo Qingquan, Luo Qunhui, Zhou Xianwang (Tujia), Zhou Jianwei, Zhou Baosheng, Zhou Jianyuan (female), Zhou Hongyu, Zhou Jiagui, Zheng Shaosan, Zheng Xinsui, Zhao Fasuo, Hu Maocheng (Tujia), Yao Shaobin (Miao), Qin Shunquan, Xia Juhua (female), Gu Hailiang, Qian Yuankun, Xu Shiyou, Xu Ping, Xu De, Guo Shenglian,Guo Youming, Guo Yuemei (female), Tang Liangzhi, Huang Yougen, Huang Jun (female), Huang Chuping, Cao Jianming, Zhang Zhian, Liang Huiling (female), Peng Mingquan, Peng Qinghua, Peng Fuchun, Jing Dali, Gu Shengzu, Cheng Licai, Tong Guohua, Xie Shengming, Xie Mingliang, Lu Yongxiang, Lu Gang, Cai Hongzhu, Cai Qihua (female), Liao Renbin, Tan Gongyan, Xiong Derong, Dai Maorong (female), Wei Zhe		
2013	12th	Ding Xiaoqiang, Ding Yanzhang, Yu Gesheng, Wan Weixing, Wan Yong, Wan Exiang, Ma Yongsheng, Ma Xinqiang, Wang Wentong, Wang Guangguo (Tujia ethnic group), Wang Hongling (female), Wang Guosheng, Wang Guobin, Wang Jinchu (female), Wang Xiaodong, Wang Tao, Mao Rifeng, Yin Zhengmin, Deng Xiuxin, ~~Deng Qilin, Deng Zhiyi, Zuo Xuwen~~, Lu Guoxiang, Ye Changbao, Feng Yunqiao, Feng Dan (female), Lü Zhongmei (female), Zhu Ning, Zhu Dixiong, Liu Jiangchao, Liu Yunmei (female), Liu Yingzi (female), Liu Xiang, Liu Xuerong, Liu Chao (female), Liu Yaming (female), Liu Jinxiu (female), Jiang Shulin, Chi Li (female), Sun Kailin, Sun Yuqiu (female), Sun Donglin, Sun Jian, Rui Yuehua, Su Xiaoyun (Tujia ethnic group), Li Lecheng, Li Jianming, Li Chunming, Li Li (female) Li Xiaohong, Li Jian, Li Peigen, Li Hongzhong, Li Jing (female), Yang Tianran (Tujia), Yang Xianlong, Yang Bo, ~~Yang Zezhu~~, Yang Jun (female), Yang Xiaobo, Yang Qin (female, Tujia), Wu Shaoxun, Bie Bixiong, She Lulin, Xin Xiyu (female), Wang Yaping, Zhang Baiqing, Zhang Guihua, Zhang Xiaoshan, Zhang Weiguo, Zhang Qiong (female, Tujia), Zhang Dehua, Chen Yilong, Chen Fengxiang, Chen Huayuan, Luo Gongying (female), Luo Qingquan, Zhou Baosheng, Zhou Jianyuan (female), Zhou Hongyu, Zhou Senfeng, Hu Shengyun, Hu Shuanghong (female), Ke Jun, Yu Zhengsheng, Yao Sheng, Yao Juan (female), Qin Shunquan, Gu Hailiang, Xu Ping, Yin Xingshan, Gao Jingpei (female, Miao), Guo Shenglian, Guo Yonghong, Guo Yuemei (female), Tang Liangzhi, Tang Lingling (female)Tang Guanjun, Huang Jun (female), Cui Guanglei, Zhang Feng, Peng Mingquan, Dong Zuoji, Jing Dali, Han Jin, Gu Shengzu, Cheng Shaoyun (female), Cheng Licai, Fu Zhenbang, Tong Guohua, Xie Yuka, Cai Hongzhu, Cai Xueen, Tan Zhiping (female, Tujia), Tan Gongyan, Tan Lunwei, Xiong Zhaozheng, Teng Gang		
2018	13th	Ding Lieyun, Yu Qingming, Wan Weixing, Wan Yong, Ma Shaobin (Hui), Ma Xinqiang, Wang Yuling (female), Wang Li, Wang Lishan, Wang Yuanhe, Wang Lan (female), Wang Jianqing, Wang Ling (female), Wang Li (female), Wang Jin, Wang Xiaodong, Wang Nenggan, Mao Zongfu, Kang Dezhi (female), Deng Xiuxin, Zuo Zhongyi, Long Zhengcai, Feng Dan (female), Bian Zhuan, Ji Mingdong, Lü Wenyan (female), Zhuang Guangming, Liu Faying (female, Tujia), Liu Ziming, Liu Jiangdong, Liu Fangzhen (Tujia), Liu Qijun, Liu Chao (female), Liu Jinxiu (female), Yan Dapeng, Yan Zibei, Xu Fangsheng, Sun Kailin, Sun Bing, Li Jie, Li Guozhang, Li Bingheng, Li Li (Female), Li Peilin, Li Jing (female, Provincial High Court), Li Jing (female, Xiangyang), Li Xia (female), Yang Yuhua (female), Yang Fang (female, Miao), Yang Zhigang, Yang Jun (female), Yang Qin (female, Tujia), Yang Deqin (female, Tujia), Xiao Lichun, Wu Haitao, Qiu Lixin (female, Manchu), He Dachun, He Lantian, Yu Shaohua, Shen Fangyong, Shen Yanfen (female, Tujia), Song Qingli (Tujia), Zhang Fengying (female), Zhang Wenxi, Zhang Jinhua, Zhang Chunxian, Zhang Baiqing, Zhang Jiasheng, Zhang Hui, Zhang Rui, Zhang Jinlan, Chen Yilong, Chen Fengxiang, Chen Huayuan, Chen Xinwu, Chen Liaoyuan, Fan Bingheng, Luo Jie, Xie Yingcai, ~~Zhou Wenxia (female)~~, Zhou Hansheng, Zhou Hongyu, Zhao Xiwei, Hao Mingjin, Hu Wuqing, Hu Weiyi, Hu Shengyun, Niu Xinqiang, Yu Cheng (female), Yao Juan (female), Qin Shunquan, Yuan Weixia (female), Xia Hengjian, Gu Xiangping, Xu Huazheng (female), Xu Xianming, Gao Youdong, Guo Yonghong (female), Tan Minqiang, Huang Kunming, Huang Wangming, Huang Chuping, Gong Dingrong, Cui Yonghui, Jiao Yong, Zhang Feng, Yan Zhi, Liang Qingkai, Dong Weimin, Jiang Chaoliang, Cheng Ju (female), Cheng Mengxing (female), Fu Dehui~~Shu Jian~~Lai Xiufu, Dou Xiankang, Cai Xueen, and Xiong Yongjun		
2023	14th	Yu Qingming, Wan Hongmei, Ma Dan, Ma Zejiang, Ma Chunshan, Ma Xinqiang, Wang Ling, Wang Li, Wang Qiong, Wang Taihui, Wang Yonghui, Wang Shouan, Wang Zhimin, Wang Zhonglin, Wang Jianqing, Wang Yanling, Wang Xuejing, Wang Yanxin, Wang Menghui, You Zheng, Kang Dezhi, Fang Beisong, Deng Ganchun, Zhan Zhiqi, Tian Shuxian, Fu Shengli, Feng Dan, Ji Mingdong, Bi Lixia, Liu Wu, Liu Changlai, Liu Jiangdong, Liu Qijun, Liu Xiaoyan, Liu Jinxiu, Yan Dapeng, Tang Weijian, Sun Taolei, Sun Daojun, Ke Ke, Li Gang, Li Jie, Li Li, Li Dianxun, Li Jing, Li Xia, Li Shaoping, Li Shaomin, Li Longti, Li Shengquan, Li Junjie, Yang Jun Yang Jun, Yang Weiguo, Yang Yuhua, Yang Xingming, Yang Deqin, Xiao Jie, Wu Zhiling, Qiu Xueqiang, He Zhonglin, Min Hongyan, Wang Yong, Wang Tiemin, Wang Daowen, Shen Yanfen, Song Ling, Song Baoliang, Zhang Min, Zhang Youhui, Zhang Wentong, Zhang Youping, Zhang Qiongli, Zhang Jinlan, Chen Ping, Chen Weiguo, Chen Zhimeng, Chen Liaoyuan, Lin Jianhua, Zhao Zonghe, Hu Weiyi, Hu Lishan, Hu Jiuming, Hou Ximin, Nie Xiaowei, Xia Xifan, Tie Ning, Xu Weilin, Gao Zongyu, Huang Li, Huang Lin, Huang Yan, E Jingping, Zhang Xiaolian, Liang Yunying, Dong Zhenxing, Cheng Xing, Cheng Yongwen, Jiao Xian, You Quanrong, Xie Zhibin, Zhen ZhanminLei Chunhua, Cai Ling, Xiong Tao, Xiong Yongjun, Miao Xiaoping, Li Donghui, Pan Jiaofeng	113	
