= Chen Zhenggao =

Chinese politician (1952–2024)

- 陈政高

Minister of Housing and Urban–Rural Development
- In office 27 June 2014 – 27 June 2017
- Premier: Li Keqiang
- Preceded by: Jiang Weixin
- Succeeded by: Wang Menghui

Governor of Liaoning
- In office 22 December 2007 – 5 May 2014
- Party Secretary: Zhang Wenyue; Wang Min
- Preceded by: Zhang Wenyue
- Succeeded by: Li Xi

Personal details
- Born: March 1952 Haicheng County, Liaoning, China
- Died: 16 June 2024 (aged 72) Beijing, China
- Party: Chinese Communist Party
- Education: Dalian Maritime University

Chinese name
- Simplified Chinese: 陈政高
- Traditional Chinese: 陳政高
Transcriptions
Standard Mandarin
- Hanyu Pinyin: Chén Zhènggāo

Chen Zhenggao (Chinese: 陈政高; pinyin: Chén Zhènggāo; March 1952 – 16 June 2024) was a Chinese politician. He was best known for his terms as Minister of Housing and Urban–Rural Development, and governor of Liaoning province.

== Biography ==
Chen was born in Haicheng, Liaoning Province, China. He was the mayor of Shenyang, the capital of Liaoning. In December 2005, he was appointed the secretary of the CPC's Shenyang City committee. On 22 December 2007, the standing committee of Liaoning People's Congress accepted the request for the resignation of Zhang Wenyue as the governor of the Liaoning, and appointed Chen Zhenggao as the vice-governor. The committee also decided that Chen would become the acting Governor of Liaoning.

In 2009, despite the 2008 financial crisis, Chen led a group of over 200 officials on a business trip to Japan, where they spent a total of 50 million yen (roughly US$500,000) on dining and related expenses.

In 2014, Chen was appointed the Minister of Housing and Urban–Rural Development replacing Jiang Weixin, and Li Xi succeeded him as Governor of Liaoning. He left office in 2017 upon reaching the mandated retirement age for ministerial-level officials of 65.

He was an alternate of the CPC's 17th Central Committee and a full member of the CPC's 18th Central Committee.

Chen died on 16 June 2024, at the age of 72.

Political offices
Preceded by Jiang Weixin	Minister of Housing and Urban–Rural Development; 2014–2017	Succeeded by Wang Menghui
Preceded by Zhang Wenyue	Governor of Liaoning; 2007–2014	Succeeded by Li Xi
