= Zhou Xianwang =

Chinese politician

- 周先旺

Vice Chairman of the Hubei Provincial Committee of the Chinese People's Political Consultative Conference
- Incumbent
- Assumed office 26 January 2021
- Chairman: Huang Chuping

Mayor of Wuhan
- In office May 2018 – January 2021
- Leader: Ma Guoqiang →Wang Zhonglin (Party secretary)
- Preceded by: Wan Yong
- Succeeded by: Cheng Yongwen

Deputy Governor of Hubei
- In office March 2017 – May 2018
- Governor: Wang Xiaodong

Communist Party Secretary of Huangshi
- In office December 2012 – April 2017
- Preceded by: Wang Jianming
- Succeeded by: Ma Xudong

Personal details
- Born: November 1962 (age 63) Jianshi County, Hubei
- Party: Chinese Communist Party (1987-2026, expelled)
- Education: Hubei University; Central Party School of the Chinese Communist Party

Zhou Xianwang (Chinese: 周先旺; pinyin: Zhōu Xiānwàng; born November 1962) is a Chinese politician currently serving as vice chairman of the Hubei Provincial Committee of the Chinese People's Political Consultative Conference. Previously, he served as Deputy Party Committee Secretary and mayor of Wuhan. He is of Tujia heritage. He entered the workforce in September 1980, and joined the Chinese Communist Party in January 1987.

== Biography ==
Zhou was born in Jianshi County, Hubei, in November 1962. Zhou served in his home-county for a long time, what he was promoted to deputy magistrate in February 1993. He was secretary of Enshi Tujia and Miao Autonomous Prefecture Committee of the Communist Youth League in January 1994, and held that office until September 1995. In September 1995 he was promoted to become deputy party secretary and magistrate of Xuan'en County, a position he held until April 1998. He served as vice-mayor of Enshi Tujia and Miao Autonomous Prefecture in April 1998, and four years later promoted to the mayor position. In February 2008, he was appointed head of Hubei Provincial Department of Commerce and director of Hubei Provincial Foreign Investment Office, he remained in that position until November 2012, when he was transferred to Huangshi and appointed the party secretary. He concurrently served as deputy governor of Hubei from March 2017 to May 2018. In May 2018, he was named acting mayor and deputy party secretary of Wuhan, replacing Wan Yong. On January 26, 2021, he was elected vice chairman of the Hubei Provincial Committee of the Chinese People's Political Consultative Conference.

=== Criticism ===
In December 2019, when a new coronavirus, designated SARS-CoV-2, broke out in Wuhan, local people accused Zhou and his superior, Party secretary Ma Guoqiang of being slow to respond to the epidemic. On January 27, 2020, in an interview on China Central Television, Zhou acknowledged that the city government had failed to promptly disclose information about the outbreak while stating that "as a local government, we need to get authorisation before disclosure" which led many to think that he was pointing at the central government for being slow on giving him authorisation. Zhou then offered to resign over the January 23 decision to lock down the city.

In addition, Zhou was criticized for hosting the Baibuting banquet on January 18, 2020, where 40,000 Wuhan families cooked and ate a communal meal in celebration of the New Year, five days before the city went into lockdown.

== Downfall ==
On 8 July 2025, Zhou was suspected of "serious violations of laws and regulations" by the Central Commission for Discipline Inspection (CCDI), the party's internal disciplinary body, and the National Supervisory Commission, the highest anti-corruption agency of China. Zhou was expelled from the party and dismissed from the public office on 4 January 2026.

On 10 October 2026, Zhou was sentenced to 14 years and fined 5 million yuan at Shangqiu Intermediate People's Court in Henan, for taking bribes in 60.5 million yuan.

Party political offices
Preceded by Wang Jianming	Communist Party Secretary of Huangshi; 2012–2017	Succeeded by Ma Xuming
Government offices
Preceded by Wan Yong	Mayor of Wuhan; 2018–2021	Succeeded by Cheng Yongwen
