= Zhang Yun =

Zhang Yun may refer to:

- Zhang Yun (Han Dynasty), military general
- Zhang Yun (banker) (born 1959), Chinese economist and banker
