= Ma Guoqiang =

Chinese politician (born 1963)

- 马国强

Party Secretary of Wuhan
- In office 20 July 2018 – 12 February 2020
- Deputy: Zhou Xianwang (mayor)
- Preceded by: Chen Yixin
- Succeeded by: Wang Zhonglin

Deputy Party Secretary of Hubei
- In office March 2018 – 12 February 2020
- Leader: Jiang Chaoliang (Party secretary)
- Preceded by: Chen Yixin
- Succeeded by: Wang Zhonglin

Chairman of Baowu Group
- In office October 2016 – June 2018
- Preceded by: New position
- Succeeded by: Chen Derong

Personal details
- Born: November 1963 (age 62) Dingzhou, Hebei, China
- Party: Chinese Communist Party
- Education: Huazhong University of Science and Technology; University of Science and Technology Beijing; RWTH Aachen University

Chinese name
- Traditional Chinese: 馬國強
- Simplified Chinese: 马国强
Transcriptions
Standard Mandarin
- Hanyu Pinyin: Mǎ Guóqiáng
- IPA: [mà kwǒ.tɕʰjǎŋ]

Ma Guoqiang (Chinese: 马国强; born November 1963) is a Chinese politician, engineer, and business executive. He had served as Deputy Party Secretary of Hubei province and Party Secretary of Wuhan, the capital of Hubei, from 2018 to 2020. Ma previously served as Chairman of Baowu Group, China's largest steelmaker. He is an alternate and then a member of the 19th Central Committee of the Chinese Communist Party and was a delegate to the 8th National People's Congress.

== Early life and education ==
Ma was born in Dingzhou, Hebei in November 1963. He is a member of the Hui ethnic group.

In September 1980, he entered Huazhong Institute of Technology (now Huazhong University of Science and Technology), majoring in materials management and engineering. In September 1984 he entered the graduate school of Beijing Iron and Steel Institute (now University of Science and Technology Beijing) and joined the Chinese Communist Party in December 1985. After earning his master's degree in 1986, he was hired by the institute as a faculty member. In September 1991, he was sent to Germany to study at the RWTH Aachen University on a government scholarship. He returned to China in September 1993 and continued to teach at the University of Science and Technology Beijing.

== Career at Baowu ==
Ma began working at Baosteel of Shanghai in July 1995, and became director of the Planning and Finance Department in 1999. He became deputy general manager of Baosteel in March 2001 and was promoted to general manager in April 2009. In July 2013, he was appointed general manager of Wuhan Iron and Steel Corporation. He was elevated to its chairman and party secretary in May 2015. When Baosteel and Wuhan Steel merged to form Baowu Steel in October 2016, he was appointed the chairman and party secretary of the new company, China's largest steelmaker.

== Political career ==
Ma was a delegate to the 8th National People's Congress (1993–1998). He was elected an alternate of the 19th Central Committee of the Chinese Communist Party in 2017. In March 2018, he was transferred from Baowu to the provincial government of Hubei and appointed deputy party secretary of the province. On 20 July 2018, he received the additional appointment as party secretary of Wuhan, the city's top official. The position had been vacant for four months since his predecessor Chen Yixin was transferred to the national government.

During the COVID-19 pandemic, Wuhan residents criticized Ma and his subordinate, mayor Zhou Xianwang for their slow response to the epidemic. In an interview with China Central Television (CCTV) on 27 January 2020, Zhou admitted that the city government had failed to promptly disclose information about the outbreak and offered to resign, although he added that "it's an infectious disease, and relevant information should be released according to the law. As a local government, we can only disclose information after being authorized." When Ma was interviewed by television host Bai Yansong four days later, he expressed his feelings of "regret, guilt and self-blame".

On February 13, 2020, Ma was removed from his posts as deputy party secretary of Hubei and party secretary of Wuhan. He was succeeded by Wang Zhonglin, Communist Party Secretary of Jinan.

In August 2021, he became a member of the Party Branch Committee of Hubei People's Congress. On 23 January 2022, he became vice chairman of Hubei People's Congress.

In October 2022, he became a member of the 19th Central Committee of the Chinese Communist Party.

Business positions
New title	Chairman of Baowu Group; 2016–2018	Succeeded by Chen Derong
Party political offices
Preceded by Chen Yixin	Deputy Party Secretary of Hubei; 2018–2020	Succeeded by Wang Zhonglin
Preceded by Chen Yixin	Party Secretary of Wuhan; 2018–2020	Succeeded by Wang Zhonglin
