= Yang Luyu =

Chinese politician (born 1957)

- 杨鲁豫

Mayor of Jinan
- In office January 2012 – April 6, 2016
- Preceded by: Zhang Jianguo
- Succeeded by: Wang Zhonglin

Communist Party Secretary of Tai'an
- In office February 2008 – December 2011
- Preceded by: Geng Wenqing
- Succeeded by: Li Hongfeng

Chairman of Tai'an People's Congress
- In office January 2018 – February 2012
- Preceded by: Geng Wenqing
- Succeeded by: Li Hongfeng

Personal details
- Born: March 1957 (age 69) Ju County, Shandong, China
- Party: Chinese Communist Party (expelled)
- Education: Harbin Institute of Technology

Chinese name
- Traditional Chinese: 楊魯豫
- Simplified Chinese: 杨鲁豫
Transcriptions
Standard Mandarin
- Hanyu Pinyin: Yáng Lǔyù

Yang Luyu (Chinese: 杨鲁豫; pinyin: Yáng Lǔyù; born March 1957) is a former Chinese politician, who served as Mayor of Jinan, Shandong Province. He was dismissed from his position in April 2016 for investigation by the Central Commission for Discipline Inspection.

== Career ==
Yang Luyu was born in Ju County, Shandong. He joined the Chinese Communist Party (CCP) in July 1985 and graduated from the department of Construction of Harbin Institute of Technology. In 1987, Yang became the Ministry of Construction official. In November 1992, he became the deputy mayor of Dongying. He moved to Ministry of Construction in 1999. In 2003, he served as deputy mayor of Jinan Yang became the CCP Committee Secretary of Tai'an in 2008. In January 2012, Yang elected as mayor of Jinan.

On April 6, 2016, Yang Luyu was placed under investigation by the Central Commission for Discipline Inspection, the party's internal disciplinary body, for "serious violations of regulations". He was expelled from the CCP on July 28 for violating the Eight-point Regulation and taking bribes in exchange for political favors. On May 5, 2017, Yang was sentenced to 14 years in prison for bribery.

Assembly seats
Previous: Geng Wenqing	Chairman of Tai'an People's Congress; 2008-2012	Next: Li Hongfeng
Party political offices
Previous: Geng Wenqing	Communist Party Secretary of Tai'an; 2008-2012	Next: Li Hongfeng
Government offices
Previous: Zhang Jianguo	Mayor of Jinan; 2012-2016	Next: Wang Zhonglin
