= Jiang Chaoliang =

Chinese politician and investor

- 蒋超良
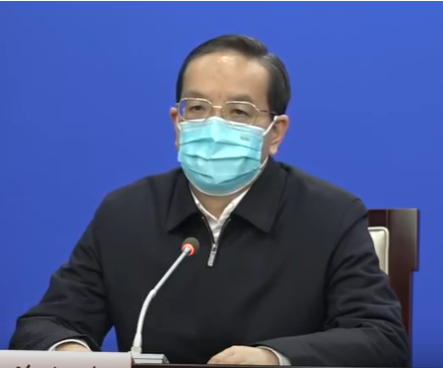

Party Secretary of Hubei
- In office October 29, 2016 – February 13, 2020
- Deputy: Wang Xiaodong (Governor)
- General secretary: Xi Jinping
- Preceded by: Li Hongzhong
- Succeeded by: Ying Yong

Chairman of the Standing Committee of the Hubei People's Congress
- In office January 2017 – March 2020
- Preceded by: Li Hongzhong
- Succeeded by: Ying Yong

Governor of Jilin
- In office September 5, 2014 – October 29, 2016 (Acting until October 29, 2014)
- Party Secretary: Bayanqolu
- Preceded by: Bayanqolu
- Succeeded by: Liu Guozhong

Chairman of the Agricultural Bank of China
- In office November 2011 – August 2014
- Preceded by: Xiang Junbo
- Succeeded by: Liu Shiyu

President of the China Development Bank
- In office September 2008 – November 2011
- Preceded by: Chen Yuan
- Succeeded by: Zheng Zhijie

Chairman of the Bank of Communications
- In office May 2004 – September 2008
- Preceded by: Yin Jieyan
- Succeeded by: Hu Huaibang

Personal details
- Born: August 1957 (age 69) Miluo, Hunan, China
- Party: Chinese Communist Party (1981-2025, expelled)
- Education: Southwestern University of Finance and Economics

Chinese name
- Traditional Chinese: 蔣超良
- Simplified Chinese: 蒋超良
Transcriptions
Standard Mandarin
- Hanyu Pinyin: Jiǎng Chāoliáng

Jiang Chaoliang (simplified Chinese: 蒋超良; traditional Chinese: 蔣超良; pinyin: Jiǎng Chāoliáng; born August 1957) is a Chinese politician and investor. In the past, he has served as the governor of Jilin province in Northeast China, and an executive at China Development Bank and the Agricultural Bank of China. Jiang is also a member of the 19th Central Committee of the Chinese Communist Party. In February 2020, he was dismissed as the Party Secretary of Hubei.

== Career ==
Jiang graduated with a master's degree in economics from Southwestern University of Finance and Economics and is a senior economist. His first position upon graduation was as director of the Shenzhen Division of the State Administration of Foreign Exchange. He then served in the same capacity within the Guangdong Division. In June 2000 he served as an assistant to the Governor of the People's Bank of China, working under Dai Xianglong.

In September 2002, he entered politics, and was named the vice governor of Hubei. In June 2004, he became a non-executive director and chairman of the Board of the Bank of Communications. In September 2008 he became president and Vice Chairman of the China Development Bank. In January 2012, chairman and Chairman of Strategic Planning Committee of the Agricultural Bank of China.

Jiang was credited with transforming the Bank of Communications into a dual-listed company with HSBC Holdings and as acting as its strategic investor and partner.

In September 2014, Jiang was appointed acting governor of Jilin province, succeeding Bayanqolu, who had been appointed Communist Party Secretary of the province. He was confirmed as Governor by the provincial People's Congress on October 29, 2014. During his term in Jilin, the province's GDP growth figures peaked above the national average. Jiang was appointed party secretary of Hubei in October 2016. On February 12, 2020, Jiang was removed from his post as Party secretary of Hubei as a result of his handling of the COVID-19 pandemic, and was replaced by Ying Yong, mayor of Shanghai and a close ally of General Secretary of the Chinese Communist Party Xi Jinping.

On March 5, 2020, Jiang has resigned as chairman of the Standing Committee of the Hubei People's Congress at the 15th session of the 13th Hubei People's Congress.

On August 20, 2021, he was appointed vice chairperson of the National People's Congress Agriculture and Rural Affairs Committee.

He is also an adviser to the China Finance 40 Forum (CF40).

== Downfall ==
On February 21, 2025, Jiang was suspected of "serious violations of laws and regulations" by the Central Commission for Discipline Inspection (CCDI), the party's internal disciplinary body, and the National Supervisory Commission, the highest anti-corruption agency of China. He was expelled from the Chinese Communist Party and public office on October 27.

On August 28, 2026, Jiang was sentenced to death with a two-year reprieve, and will be commuted to life imprisonment after two years at the Intermediate People's Court of Nanjing. According to the verdict, Jiang was taking bribes in 746 million yuan.

Business positions
| Preceded by Yin Jieyan | Chairman of the Bank of Communications; 2004－2008 | Succeeded by Hu Huaibang |
| Preceded by Chen Yuan | President of the China Development Bank; 2008－2011 | Succeeded by Zheng Zhijie |
| Preceded by Xiang Junbo | Chairman of the Agricultural Bank of China; 2011－2014 | Succeeded by Liu Shiyu |
Political offices
| Preceded by Bayanqolu | Governor of Jilin; 2014–2016 | Succeeded by Liu Guozhong |
Party political offices
| Preceded by Li Hongzhong | Party Secretary of Hubei; 2016–2020 | Succeeded by Ying Yong |
Assembly seats
| Preceded by Li Hongzhong | Chairman of the Standing Committee of the Hubei People's Congress; 2017-2020 | Succeeded by Ying Yong |
