= Ying Yong =

Chinese politician

Prosecutor General Ying Yong
- 应勇

Procurator-General of the Supreme People's Procuratorate
- Incumbent
- Assumed office 11 March 2023
- Preceded by: Zhang Jun

Deputy Procurator-General of the Supreme People's Procuratorate
- In office 2 September 2022 – 11 March 2023
- Procurator-General: Zhang Jun

Party Secretary of Hubei
- In office 13 February 2020 – 28 March 2022
- Deputy: Wang Xiaodong; Wang Zhonglin (Governor)
- General Secretary: Xi Jinping
- Preceded by: Jiang Chaoliang
- Succeeded by: Wang Menghui

Mayor of Shanghai
- In office 20 January 2017 – 13 February 2020
- Party Secretary: Han Zheng; Li Qiang
- Preceded by: Yang Xiong
- Succeeded by: Gong Zheng

Personal details
- Born: 17 November 1957 (age 68) Xianju County, Zhejiang, China
- Party: Chinese Communist Party
- Education: China University of Political Science and Law; Hangzhou University

Ying Yong (simplified Chinese: 应勇; traditional Chinese: 應勇; pinyin: Yīng Yǒng; born 17 November 1957) is a Chinese politician and lawyer who is currently serving as the procurator-general of the Supreme People's Procuratorate.

Ying came to prominence beginning in 2003 in Zhejiang province, and served as the president of the provincial High Court. He served as the head of the Organization Department of the Shanghai Municipal Party Committee before he became deputy Party secretary of Shanghai. He became the mayor of Shanghai in January 2017. On February 12, 2020, Ying was appointed Party secretary of Hubei, replacing Jiang Chaoliang during the COVID-19 pandemic, where he served until March 2022.

== Early life ==
Ying was born in Xianju County, Zhejiang province, near the city of Taizhou. He joined the Chinese Communist Party in April 1979. He holds law degrees from the China University of Political Science and Law and Hangzhou University.

== Local career ==
=== Zhejiang ===
Ying began his career in Huangyan County, Zhejiang, working for the county industry bureau and the local police station. He then served as the mayor of the town of Chengguan (城关镇). He successively worked his way up the bureaucratic hierarchy in Taizhou, heading its public security department, then its Political and Legal Affairs Commission (Zhengfawei). He then became the police chief and Zhengfawei head of neighboring Shaoxing.

Ying was promoted to the provincial government in 1995, serving as the deputy provincial police chief, then the head of the provincial office for combating illegal drugs, and the leader of an effort to combat terrorism. In July 2003, Ying was promoted to Deputy Secretary of the Provincial Commission for Discipline Inspection, and several months later the concurrent head of the provincial Department of Supervision. At the time, Xi Jinping was the provincial party secretary. As such, Ying has been named by political observers as a member of the "New Zhijiang Army." In November 2006, Ying was named president of the Zhejiang Provincial High Court.

=== Shanghai ===
Ying became president of the Shanghai High Court in January 2008. In April 2013, Ying was named the head of the Organization Department of the Shanghai Municipal Party Committee, and a member of the municipality's Party Standing Committee. In June 2014, he was named deputy party secretary, overseeing party affairs and the municipal party school. In September 2016, he further obtained the office of vice-mayor. This was considered highly unusual, as deputy party secretaries do not usually hold deputy government positions simultaneously. The move was therefore interpreted as grooming Ying for higher office, likely the future mayor of Shanghai. On 20 January 2017, Ying Yong was elected as mayor of Shanghai. Ying was the first mayor since Zhu Rongji to have spent the majority of his career outside of the municipality. Observers have noted that Ying is likely slated for further promotion. In 2017 he was elected a full member of the 19th Central Committee of the Chinese Communist Party.

Ying was a delegate to the 18th Party Congress, and a delegate to the 11th and 12th National People's Congress.

=== Hubei ===
On February 12, 2020, Ying was appointed Party secretary of Hubei, replacing Jiang Chaoliang during the COVID-19 pandemic. On June 19, he was elected chairman of the Hubei Provincial People's Congress.

== National career ==
On April 20, 2022, he was made vice chairperson of the Constitution and Law Committee of the National People's Congress. On September 2, he was chosen as deputy procurator-general of the Supreme People's Procuratorate. On 11 March 2023, he was formally elected as the procurator-general, succeeding Zhang Jun.

Government offices
Preceded by Zhu Xiaoqing	President of Zhejiang Provincial Supervision Department; 2003–2006	Succeeded by Chen Yanhua
Preceded by Tu Guangshao	Executive Vice Mayor of Shanghai; 2016–2017	Succeeded by Zhou Bo
Preceded by Yang Xiong	Mayor of Shanghai; 2017–2020	Succeeded by Gong Zheng
Legal offices
Preceded by Zhang Qimei	President of the Zhejiang High People's Court; 2005–2007	Succeeded by Qi Qi
Preceded by Teng Yilong	President of the Shanghai High People's Court; 2008–2013	Succeeded by Cui Yadong
Preceded by Zhang Jun	Procurator-General of the Supreme People's Procuratorate; 2023–present	Incumbent
Party political offices
Preceded by Li Xi	Head of the Organization Department of the Shanghai Party Committee; 2013–2014	Succeeded by Xu Zezhou
Preceded by Li Xi	Deputy Party Secretary of Shanghai; 2014–2017	Succeeded by Yin Hong
Preceded by Jiang Chaoliang	Party Secretary of Hubei; 2020–2022	Succeeded by Wang Menghui
Assembly seats
Previous: Jiang Chaoliang	Chairman of the Hubei Provincial People's Congress; 2020–2023	Succeeded by Wang Menghui
