= Zhang Yun (banker) =

Chinese economist and banker (born 1959)

- 张云
- Born: May 1959 (age 67); Dali County, Weinan, Shaanxi, China
- Education: Lanzhou University; South China Agricultural University; Wuhan University
- Occupations: Economist, banker
- Years active: 1982 - 2015
- Organization: Agricultural Bank of China (ABC)
- Title: President of Agricultural Bank of China
- Term: January 2009 - November 2015
- Predecessor: Xiang Junbo
- Successor: Zhao Huan
- Political party: Chinese Communist Party

Zhang Yun (simplified Chinese: 张云; traditional Chinese: 張雲; pinyin: Zhāng Yún; born May 1959) is a Chinese economist and banker who served as president of Agricultural Bank of China (ABC) from January 2009 to December 2015. He had also served as vice-president and Chinese Communist Party Deputy Committee Secretary of the bank. In November 2015 he was taken away by the anti-graft authorities. He spent over 30 years working at the bank and was appointed vice-chairman, president and CCP Deputy Committee Secretary at the bank in 2009. Zhang Yun is so far the most high-profile bank executive in China caught since CCP general secretary Xi Jinping's continues an anti-graft dragnet at all levels of government, military and ruling CCP. His predecessor, Xiang Junbo, was also sacked for graft.

== Biography ==
Zhang was born in May 1959 in Dali County, Shaanxi. He entered Lanzhou University in January 1978, majoring in political economics, where he graduated in January 1982. He also studied at South China Agricultural University and Wuhan University as a part-time student. Beginning in July 1985, he served in several posts in Agricultural Bank of China (ABC), including assistant president of Shenzhen branch of Agricultural Bank of China, vice-president of Guangdong branch of Agricultural Bank of China, and president of Guangxi branch of Agricultural Bank of China. Agricultural Bank of China, one of China's four massive, state-owned banks, is ranked as the world's third-largest bank with $2.7 trillion in assets, according to S&P Global. In March 2001, he was appointed assistant president of Agricultural Bank of China, nine month later, he rose to become vice-president. In January 2009 he was promoted again to become president and Chinese Communist Party Deputy Committee Secretary of the bank, replacing Xiang Junbo. In November 2015 he was taken away by the authorities under investigation as CCP general secretary Xi Jinping's continues a campaign against corruption at all levels of government. Zhang resigned in the following month.

Government offices
Previous: Xiang Junbo	President of Agricultural Bank of China; 2009 - 2015	Next: Zhao Huan (赵欢)
