= Jiang Zhuping =

Chinese aerospace engineer and politician

- 蒋祝平

Party Secretary of Hubei
- In office December 2000 – December 2001
- Preceded by: Jia Zhijie
- Succeeded by: Yu Zhengsheng

Governor of Hubei
- In office February 1995 – January 2001
- Preceded by: Jia Zhijie
- Succeeded by: Zhang Guoguang

Director of the Civil Aviation Administration of China
- In office February 1991 – December 1993
- Preceded by: Hu Yizhou
- Succeeded by: Chen Guangyi

Personal details
- Born: November 1937 (age 88) Yixing, Jiangsu, China
- Party: Chinese Communist Party
- Parent: Jiang Nanxiang
- Education: Harbin Military Engineering Institute

Jiang Zhuping (Chinese: 蒋祝平; born November 1937) is a Chinese retired aerospace engineer and politician. He served as Director of the Civil Aviation Administration of China and Governor and Party Secretary of Hubei.

== Biography ==
Jiang Zhuping was born in November 1937 in Yixing, Jiangsu Province. He is the son of Jiang Nanxiang, who served as education minister of China. He joined the work force in 1956 and the Chinese Communist Party in 1960. He graduated in 1963 from the Harbin Military Engineering Institute with a degree in Guided Missile Engineering.

After graduation Jiang worked as an engineer at the No. 5 National Defense Institute, and later became deputy director of the aircraft design institute of the Nanchang Aircraft Factory in Jiangxi and party secretary of a division of the Ministry of Aerospace Industry.

In 1985, he was appointed Executive Vice-Governor of Jiangxi Province, and in 1988 he became concurrently Deputy Party Secretary of Jiangxi. He served in both positions until 1991. From February 1991 to December 1993, he served as Director of the Civil Aviation Administration of China. He then served as Governor of Hubei Province from 1995 to January 2001, and as Party Secretary of Hubei from December 2000 to December 2001.

Jiang was a member of the 14th and the 15th Central Committees of the Chinese Communist Party.
