= Li Jia (politician, born 1964) =

Chinese politician

- 李嘉

Communist Party Secretary of Zhuhai
- In office February 2012 – March 2016
- Preceded by: Gan Lin
- Succeeded by: Guo Yuanqiang

Communist Party Secretary of Meizhou
- In office July 2010 – February 2012
- Preceded by: Liu Rizhi
- Succeeded by: Zhu Zejun

Mayor of Meizhou
- In office January 2007 – July 2010
- Preceded by: He Zhengbo
- Succeeded by: Zhu Zejun

Personal details
- Born: September 1964 (age 62) Xiangyin, Hunan, China
- Party: Chinese Communist Party (1985–2017; expelled)
- Education: Sun Yat-sen University

Li Jia (Chinese: 李嘉; pinyin: Lǐ Jiā; born September 1964) is a former Chinese politician, and Communist Party Secretary of Zhuhai, Guangdong province. He was dismissed from his position in March 2016 for investigation by the Central Commission for Discipline Inspection.

== Career ==
Li Jia was born in Xiangyin County, Hunan. He joined the Chinese Communist Party (CCP) in 1985 and graduated from the department of Electronics of Sun Yat-sen University. In 1994, Li served as Deputy Head of the CYLC Publicity Department of Guangdong and promoted to the post of head in 1996. In 2005 he became the mayor of Meizhou and promoted to the post of mayor in 2007. Li became the Communist Party Secretary of Meizhou in 2010 and transfer to Zhuhai in 2012.

== Downfall ==
On March 23, 2016, Li Jia was placed under investigation by the Central Commission for Discipline Inspection, the CCP's internal disciplinary body, for "serious violations of regulations".

On March 8, 2017, he was expelled from the CCP and removed from public office.

On January 12, 2018, Li was sentenced to 13 years in prison and fined two million yuan for taking bribes worth 20.58 million yuan by the Intermediate People's Court in Zhangzhou.

Government offices
Preceded by He Zhengbo	Mayor of Meizhou; 2007–2010	Succeeded by Zhu Zejun
Party political offices
Preceded by Liu Rizhi	Communist Party Secretary of Meizhou; 2010–2012	Succeeded by Zhu Zejun
Preceded by Gan Lin	Communist Party Secretary of Zhuhai; 2012–2016	Succeeded by Guo Yuanqiang
