= Wang Zhonglin (politician) =

Chinese politician

- 王忠林

Party Secretary of Hubei
- In office 31 December 2024 – 30 May 2026
- Deputy: Li Dianxun
- Preceded by: Wang Menghui
- Succeeded by: Guan Zhi'ou

Governor of Hubei
- In office 7 May 2021 – 2 January 2025
- Party Secretary: Ying Yong; Wang Menghui; Himself
- Preceded by: Wang Xiaodong
- Succeeded by: Li Dianxun

Party Secretary of Wuhan
- In office 12 February 2020 – May 2021
- Deputy: Zhou Xianwang (mayor)
- Preceded by: Ma Guoqiang
- Succeeded by: Guo Yuanqiang

Party Secretary of Jinan
- In office May 2018 – February 2020
- Preceded by: Wang Wentao
- Succeeded by: Sun Licheng

Mayor of Jinan
- In office November 2016 – May 2018
- Preceded by: Yang Luyu
- Succeeded by: Sun Shutao

Personal details
- Born: 13 August 1962 (age 64) Fei County, Shandong, China
- Party: Chinese Communist Party (1984-)
- Education: East China University of Political Science and Law; Ocean University of China

Wang Zhonglin (Chinese: 王忠林; pinyin: Wáng Zhōnglín; born 13 August 1962) is a Chinese politician, previously served as Party Secretary of Hubei, Party Secretary of Wuhan, and before that he served as Party Secretary of Jinan and a Shandong provincial party standing committee member. Wang is a delegate to the 13th National People's Congress.

== Early life and education ==
Wang was born in Fei County, Shandong in August 1962. In September 1980, he enrolled at East China University of Political Science and Law, majoring in criminal law, where he graduated in July 1984. He obtained a Doctor of Management degree from the Ocean University of China in June 2011.

== Career in Shandong ==
Wang joined the Chinese Communist Party (CCP) in June 1984. He served in various posts in Zaozhuang municipal government before serving as CCP committee secretary of Tengzhou, a county-level city of Zaozhuang, in December 2006. In March 2007 he became a standing committee member of the CCP Zaozhuang Municipal Committee. In December 2011, he was Deputy Party Secretary of Liaocheng, he concurrently served mayor of the city in March 2013. During his tenure, he focused on urban demolition and reconstruction, which won him national reputation. In July 2015, he was transferred to Jinan, capital of Shandong province, where he was appointed Director and Party Branch Secretary of Shandong Provincial Development and Reform Commission. One year later, he was named Deputy Party Secretary, Party Branch Secretary and Acting Mayor of Jinan, replacing Yang Luyu, who was placed under investigation by the Central Commission for Discipline Inspection, the party's internal disciplinary body, for "serious violations of regulations" in early April. In May 2018, he was promoted to become Party Secretary of Jinan and standing committee member of the CCP Shandong Provincial Committee.

== Career in Hubei ==
On 12 February 2020, he was appointed Party Secretary of Wuhan, succeeding Ma Guoqiang, who was removed from public offices for his response to the coronavirus pandemic.

On 7 May 2021, he was appointed the acting governor of Hubei. On 31 December 2024, he was made Party Secretary of Hubei, replacing Wang Menghui.

== Investigation ==
On 13 November 2026, Wang was put under investigation by the Central Commission for Discipline Inspection, the party's internal disciplinary body, for "serious violations of disciplines and regulations".

Government offices
Preceded by Lin Fenghai	Mayor of Liaocheng; 2013–2015	Succeeded by Song Junji
Preceded by Zhang Wufeng	Director of Shandong Provincial Development and Reform Commission; 2015–2016	Succeeded by Zhang Xinwen
Preceded by Yang Luyu	Mayor of Jinan; 2016–2018	Succeeded by Sun Shutao
Preceded by Wang Xiaodong	Governor of Hubei; 2021–2025	Succeeded by Li Dianxun
Party political offices
Preceded by Wang Wentao	Party Secretary of Jinan; 2018–2020	Succeeded by Sun Licheng
Preceded by Ma Guoqiang	Party Secretary of Wuhan; 2020–2021	Succeeded by Guo Yuanqiang
Preceded by Wang Menghui	Party Secretary of Hubei; 2024–2026	Succeeded by Guan Zhi'ou
