= Party Secretary of Hubei =

Provincial government position in China

Secretary of the Hubei Provincial Committee of the Chinese Communist Party
- 中国共产党湖北省委员会书记
- Emblem of the Chinese Communist Party

- Flag of the Chinese Communist Party
- Incumbent; Guan Zhi'ou since 30 May 2026
- Hubei Provincial Committee of the Chinese Communist Party
- Type: Party Committee Secretary
- Status: Provincial and ministerial-level official
- Nominator: Central Committee
- Appointer: Hubei Provincial Committee; Central Committee
- Inaugural holder: Li Xiannian
- Formation: May 1949
- Deputy: Deputy Secretary; Secretary-General

The secretary of the Hubei Provincial Committee of the Chinese Communist Party is the leader of the Hubei Provincial Committee of the Chinese Communist Party (CCP). As the CCP is the sole ruling party of the People's Republic of China (PRC), the secretary is the highest ranking post in Hubei.

The secretary is officially appointed by the CCP Central Committee based on the recommendation of the CCP Organization Department, which is then approved by the Politburo and its Standing Committee. The secretary can be also appointed by a plenary meeting of the Hubei Provincial Committee, but the candidate must be the same as the one approved by the central government. The secretary leads the Standing Committee of the Hubei Provincial Committee, and is usually a member of the CCP Central Committee. The secretary leads the work of the Provincial Committee and its Standing Committee. The secretary is outranks the governor, who is generally the deputy secretary of the committee.

The current secretary is Guan Zhi'ou, who took office on 30 May 2026.

== List of party secretaries ==
Image	Name (English)	Name (Chinese)	Term start	Term end	Ref.
	Li Xiannian	李先念	May 1949	May 1954	
	Wang Renzhong	王任重	May 1954	May 1966	
	Zeng Siyu	曾思玉	March 1970	July 1975	
	Zhao Xinchu	赵辛初	July 1975	August 1978	
	Chen Pixian	陈丕显	August 1978	1982	
	Guan Guangfu	关广富	February 1983	November 1994	
	Jia Zhijie	贾志杰	December 1994	December 2000	
	Jiang Zhuping	蒋祝平	December 2000	December 2001	
	Yu Zhengsheng	俞正声	December 2001	October 2007	
	Luo Qingquan	罗清泉	October 2007	December 2010	
	Li Hongzhong	李鸿忠	December 2010	September 2016	
	Jiang Chaoliang	蒋超良	October 2016	February 2020	
	Ying Yong	应勇	February 2020	March 2022	
	Wang Menghui	王蒙徽	March 2022	December 2024	
	Wang Zhonglin	王忠林	December 2024	May 2026	
	Guan Zhi'ou	关志鸥	May 2026	Incumbent	
