= Party Secretary of Wuhan =

Government position in China

Secretary of the Wuhan Municipal Committee of the Chinese Communist Party
- 中国共产党武汉市委员会书记
- Emblem of the Chinese Communist Party

- Flag of the Chinese Communist Party
- Incumbent; Sheng Yuechun since 18 October 2025
- Wuhan Municipal Committee of the Chinese Communist Party
- Type: Party Committee Secretary
- Status: Deputy provincial and ministerial-level official
- Member of: Wuhan Municipal Standing Committee
- Seat: Wuhan
- Nominator: Central Committee
- Appointer: Wuhan Municipal Committee; Central Committee
- Inaugural holder: Zhang Pinghua
- Formation: 1949
- Deputy: Deputy Secretary; Secretary-General

The secretary of the Wuhan Municipal Committee of the Chinese Communist Party is the leader of the Wuhan Municipal Committee of the Chinese Communist Party (CCP). As the CCP is the sole ruling party of the People's Republic of China (PRC), the secretary is the highest ranking post in Wuhan, which outranks the mayor, conventionally being the deputy secretary of the municipal committee. The secretary is also the leader of the Standing Committee of the Wuhan Municipal Committee.

The secretary is officially appointed by the CCP Central Committee based on the recommendation of the CCP Organization Department, which is then approved by the Politburo and its Standing Committee. The secretary could also appointed by a plenary meeting of the Wuhan Municipal Committee, which the candidate must be the same as the one approved by the central government.

The current secretary is Sheng Yuechun, who took office on 18 October 2025.

== List of party secretaries ==
| No. | English name | Chinese name | Took office | Left office | References |
|---|---|---|---|---|---|
| 1 | Zhang Pinghua | 張平化 | May 1949 | September 1955 | |
| 2 | Song Kanfu | 宋侃夫 | September 1955 | January 1968 | |
| 3 | Fang Ming | 何伟 | January 1968 | November 1973 | |
| 4 | Wang Kewen | 王克文 | November 1973 | November 1977 | |
| 5 | Li Renzhi | 李任之 | February 1979 | December 1980 | |
| 6 | Wang Qun | 王群 | December 1980 | August 1987 | |
| 7 | Zheng Yunfei | 郑云飞 | October 1987 | October 1991 | |
| 8 | Qian Yunlu | 钱运录 | October 1991 | December 1998 | |
| 9 | Luo Qingquan | 罗清泉 | January 1999 | October 2002 | |
| 10 | Chen Xunqiu | 陈训秋 | October 2002 | May 2005 | |
| 11 | Miao Wei | 苗圩 | May 2005 | March 2008 | |
| 12 | Yang Song | 杨松 | March 2008 | January 2011 | |
| 13 | Ruan Chengfa | 阮成发 | 30 January 2011 | 13 December 2016 | |
| 14 | Chen Yixin | 陈一新 | 26 June 2017 | 20 March 2018 | |
| 15 | Ma Guoqiang | 马国强 | 20 July 2018 | 12 February 2020 | |
| 16 | Wang Zhonglin | 王忠林 | 12 February 2020 | 30 April 2021 | |
| 17 | Guo Yuanqiang | 郭元强 | 29 September 2021 | 18 October 2025 | |
| 18 | Sheng Yuechun | 盛阅春 | 18 October 2025 | Incumbent | |
