= Wang Menghui =

Chinese politician

- 王蒙徽

Party Secretary of Hubei
- In office 29 March 2022 – 31 December 2024
- Governor: Wang Zhonglin
- Preceded by: Ying Yong
- Succeeded by: Wang Zhonglin

Chairperson of Hubei Provincial People's Congress
- In office January 2023 – January 2025
- Preceded by: Yin Yong
- Succeeded by: Wang Zhonglin

Minister of Housing and Urban–Rural Development
- In office 27 June 2017 – 28 March 2022
- Premier: Li Keqiang
- Preceded by: Chen Zhenggao
- Succeeded by: Ni Hong

Party Secretary of Shenyang
- In office August 2016 – May 2017
- Preceded by: Zeng Wei
- Succeeded by: Yi Lianhong

Party Secretary of Xiamen
- In office May 2013 – August 2016
- Preceded by: Yu Weiguo
- Succeeded by: Pei Jinjia

Personal details
- Born: 29 January 1960 (age 66) Yancheng, Jiangsu, China
- Party: Chinese Communist Party
- Education: Tsinghua University

Wang Menghui (Chinese: 王蒙徽; pinyin: Wáng Ménghuī; born January 1960) is a Chinese politician who served as Party Secretary of Hubei from 2022 to 2024. Previously he served as Minister of Housing and Urban–Rural Development. Among other roles, he has served as party chief of Xiamen, and party chief of Shenyang.

== Biography ==
Originally from Yancheng, Jiangsu. He attended the department of architecture at Tsinghua University. After graduating from university, he became an instructor at his alma mater. He also attended Warsaw University of Technology. In 1993, he abandoned academia and entered politics in Guangdong, at a county-level city under Guangzhou. In May 2004, he became mayor of Shanwei. In 2006, he obtained his master's in engineering.

In September 2008, he became party chief of Yunfu. In December 2011, he became vice governor of Fujian. In May 2013, he became party chief of Xiamen.

In August 2016, Wang was named Communist Party Secretary of Shenyang; in December 2016, he was named deputy party secretary of Liaoning province. In June 2017, Wang was named Minister of Housing and Urban–Rural Development.

In June 2017, he was appointed minister of Housing and Urban–Rural Development, and held that office until March 2022.

On 29 March 2022, he was made Party Secretary of Hubei, succeeding Ying Yong.

Government offices
Preceded by Rong Tiewen	Mayor of Shanwei; 2004–2008	Succeeded by Zheng Yanxiong
Preceded by Chen Zhenggao	Minister of Housing and Urban–Rural Development; 2017–2022	Succeeded by Ni Hong
Party political offices
Preceded by Zheng Liping (郑利平)	Party Secretary of Yunfu; 2008–2011	Succeeded by Huang Qiang
Preceded by Yu Weiguo	Communist Party Secretary of Xiamen; 2013–2016	Succeeded by Pei Jinjia
Preceded by Zeng Wei	Party Secretary of Shenyang; 2016–2017	Succeeded by Yi Lianhong
Preceded by Zeng Wei	Deputy Party Secretary of Liaoning; 2016–2017	Succeeded by Yi Lianhong
Preceded by Ying Yong	Party Secretary of Hubei; 2022–2024	Succeeded by Wang Zhonglin
Assembly seats
Preceded by Ying Yong	Chairperson of Hubei Provincial People's Congress; 2023–present	Incumbent
