= Southwestern University of Finance and Economics =

Public university in Chengdu, Sichuan, China

Coordinates: 30.67048°N 104.01187°E

- 西南财经大学
- Former names: Sichuan Institute of Finance and Economics (四川财经学院)
- Motto: 经世济民，孜孜以求
- Motto in English: To persistently strive for the benefit of people and society
- Type: National University
- Established: 1925; 101 years ago
- Affiliations: EQUIS, Double First-Class Construction, 211 Project
- Chairman: Prof. ZHAO De Wu
- President: Prof. ZHUO Zhi
- Faculty: 2,000+
- Students: 24,000+ (600+ International Students)
- Undergraduates: 16,000+
- Postgraduates: 8,000+
- Location: Chengdu, Sichuan, China
- Campus: Urban, Suburb
- Colours: SWUFE BLUE WHITE
- Nickname: SWUFE / 苏菲
- Website: swufe.edu.cn e.swufe.edu.cn

Southwestern University of Finance and Economics
- Simplified Chinese: 西南财经大学
- Traditional Chinese: 西南財經大學
Transcriptions
Standard Mandarin
- Hanyu Pinyin: Xīnán Cáijīng Dàxué

The Southwestern University of Finance and Economics (SWUFE; 西南财经大学) is a public finance and economics university in Chengdu, Sichuan, China. It is affiliated with the Ministry of Education, and co-funded with the Sichuan Provincial People's Government. The university is part of Project 211 and the Double First-Class Construction.

In December 2014, SWUFE's School of Business Administration became the first business school in Western China to be accredited by the European Quality Improvement System.

As of 2024, Southwestern University of Finance and Economics ranked # 1 in Western China and # 4 nationwide among universities specialized in finance, business, and economics in the Best Chinese Universities Ranking. The U.S. News & World Report ranks SWUFE at 4th in Asia and 17th globally in Business and Economics.

== History ==
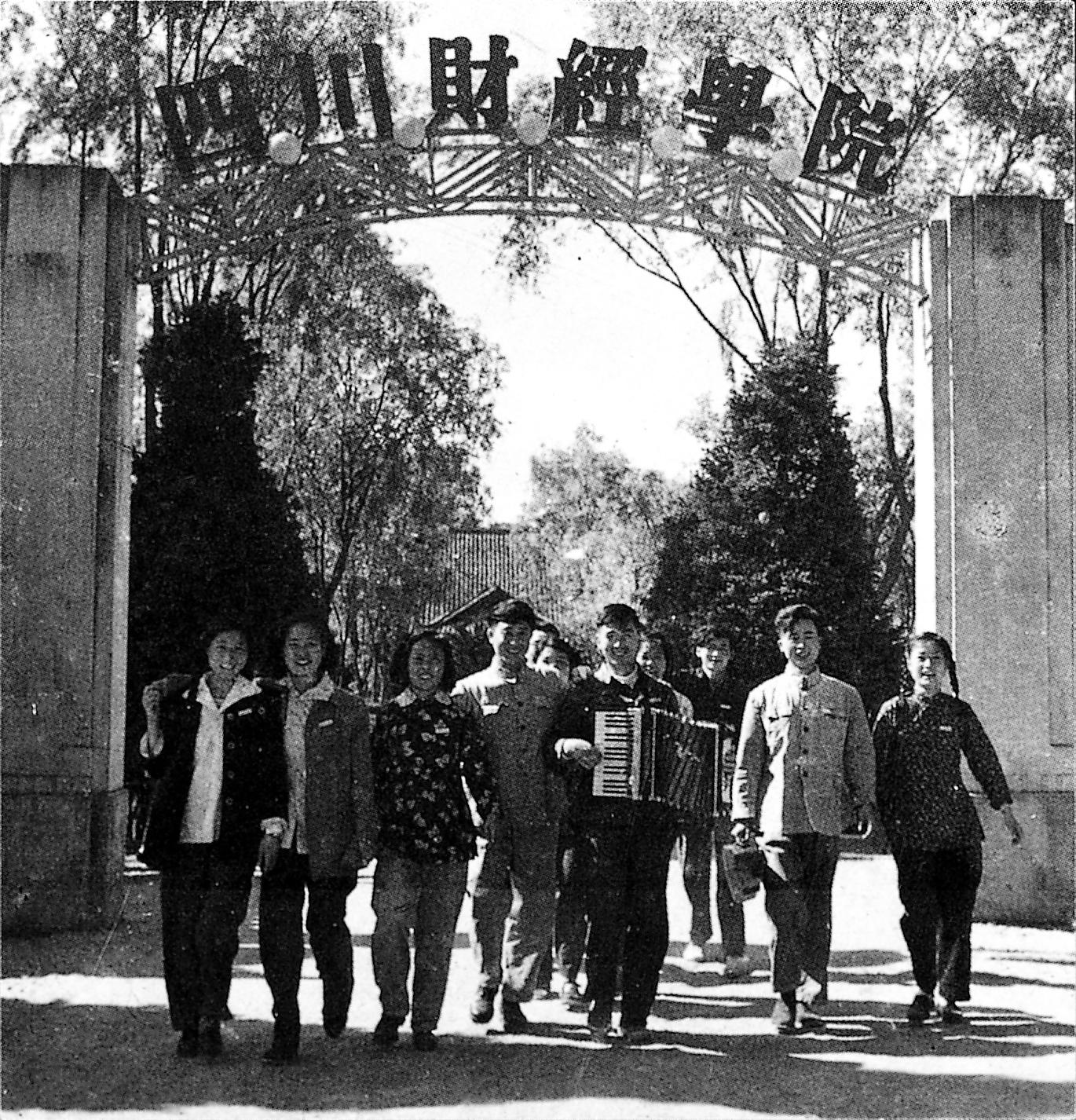
Students of Sichuan Institute of Finance and Economics in 1952

The university traces its origins to the year 1925, when a group of students and academics from St. John's University in Shanghai, led by the scholar Zhang Shouyong, left the school following the events of the May 30th Movement and founded Kwang Hua University in Shanghai. In 1938, following the outbreak of the Second Sino-Japanese War and the Japanese advance into mainland China, the university relocated its headquarters to Chengdu. This move was mirrored by other major Chinese universities in the east of China who relocated their operations to western China after the Republic of China moved its capital from Nanjing to Chongqing.

After the end of World War II, the university moved back to Shanghai in 1946 and the campus in Chengdu became a branch of Kwang Hua University. That same year, the campus in Chengdu separated from the university and formed a private university called Chenghua University. Kwang Hua University was later merged with other universities and formed the current East China Normal University.

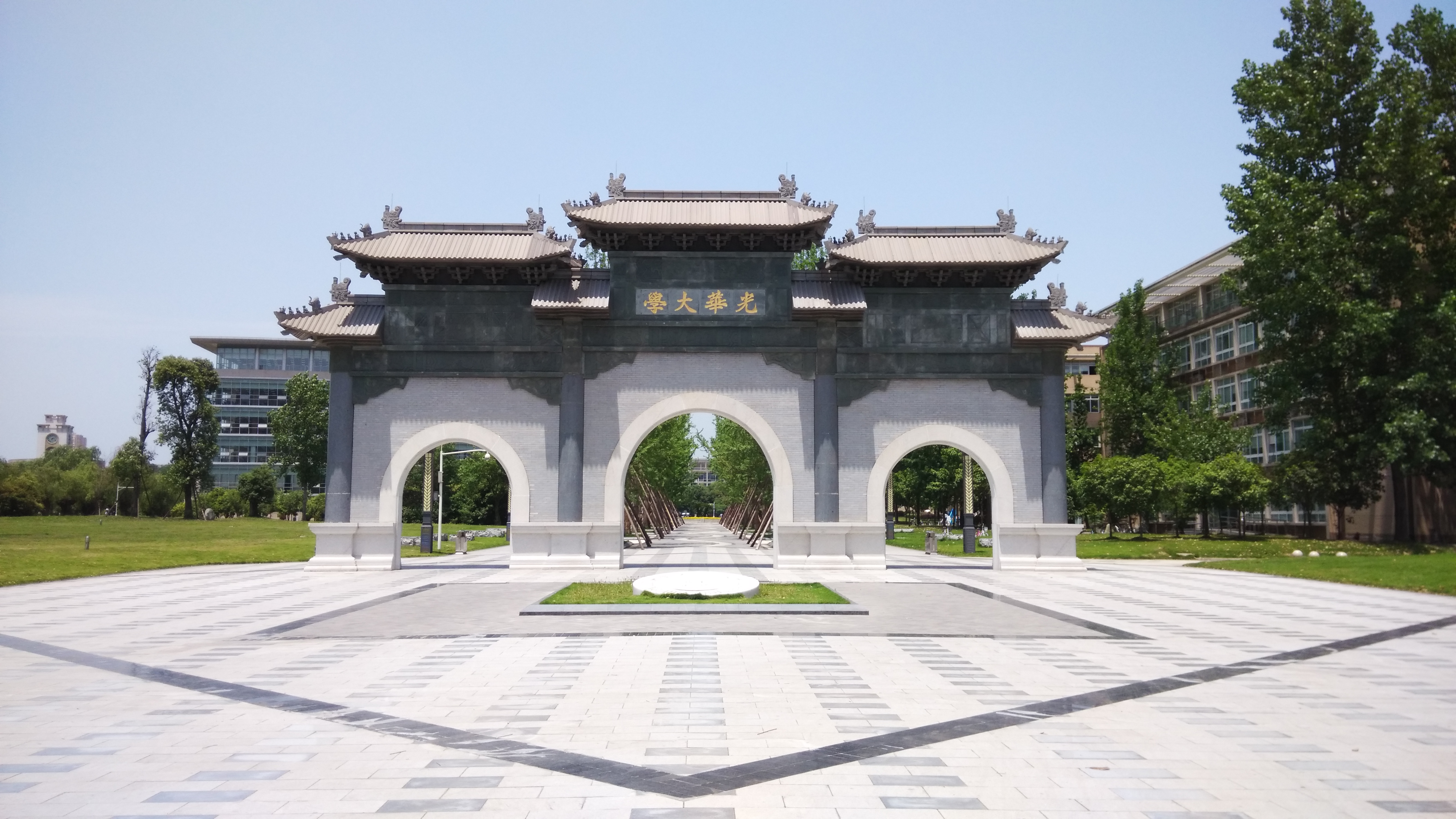
Guanghua Gate on Liulin Campus

In 1952, after the foundation of the People's Republic of China, Chenghua University was merged with schools and departments of business and economics from 16 other universities and colleges and was reformed as the Sichuan Institute of Finance and Economics. From 1961 to 1978 it was called Chengdu University. In 1980, the People's Bank of China took over the administration of the university which it held until the year 2000 when the administration was transferred to the Ministry of Education. In 1985, during the tenure of the central bank, the university received its current name of Southwestern University of Finance and Economics.

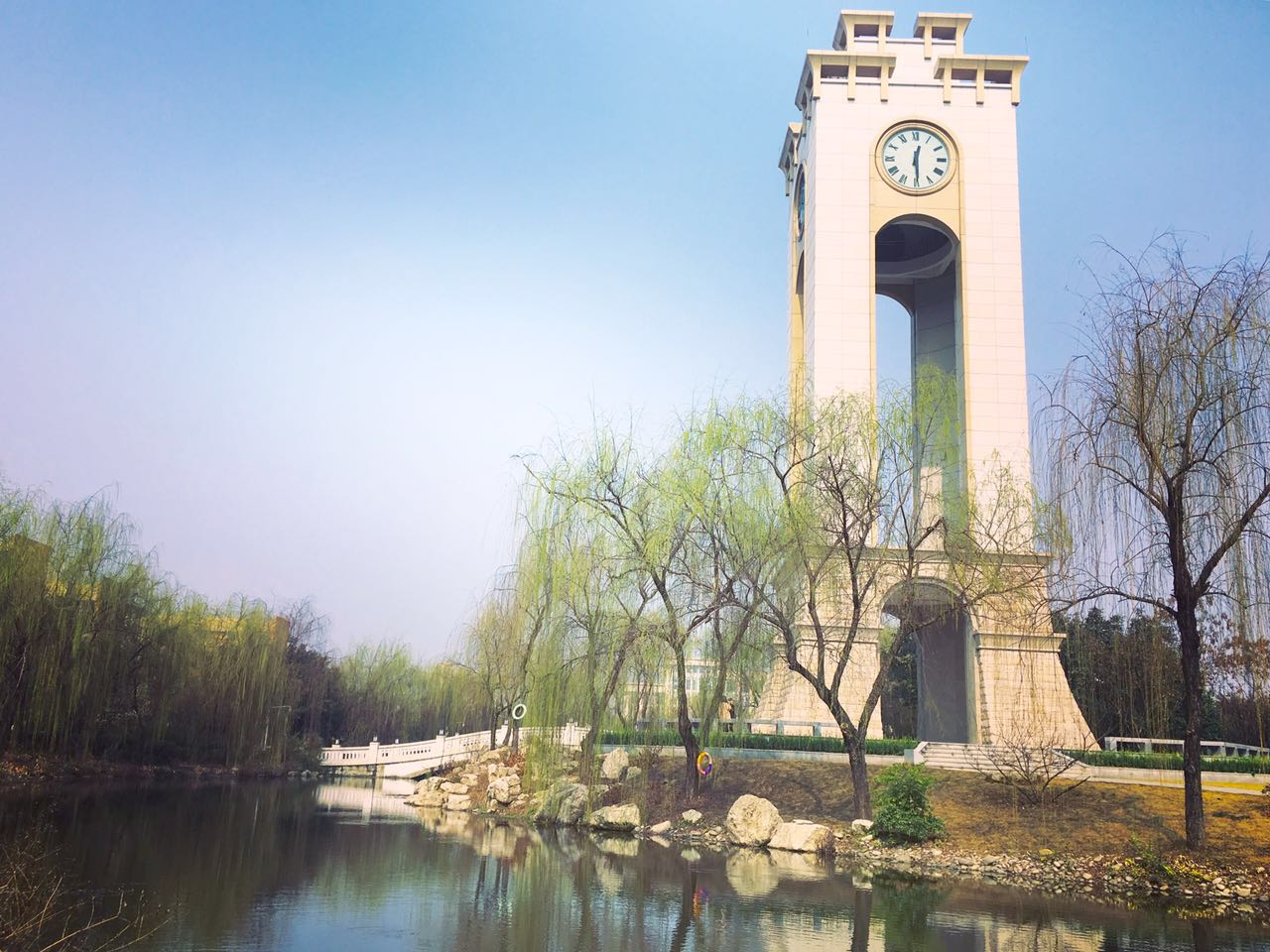
Bell tower on Liulin campus

Later, in 1995, the university became part of Project 211. In 2011, SWUFE was listed as part of the 985 Innovative Platforms for Key Disciplines Project, which is an extension of Project 985.

In 2017, the Ministry of Education, Ministry of Finance and National Development and Reform Commission released the list of Double First Class Plan universities and that of the Double First Class Plan (short as "Double First Class") development universities and disciplines. SWUFE was included into the list of China's "Double First Class" development university, and applied economics was selected as a "double first class" development discipline.

== Campuses ==
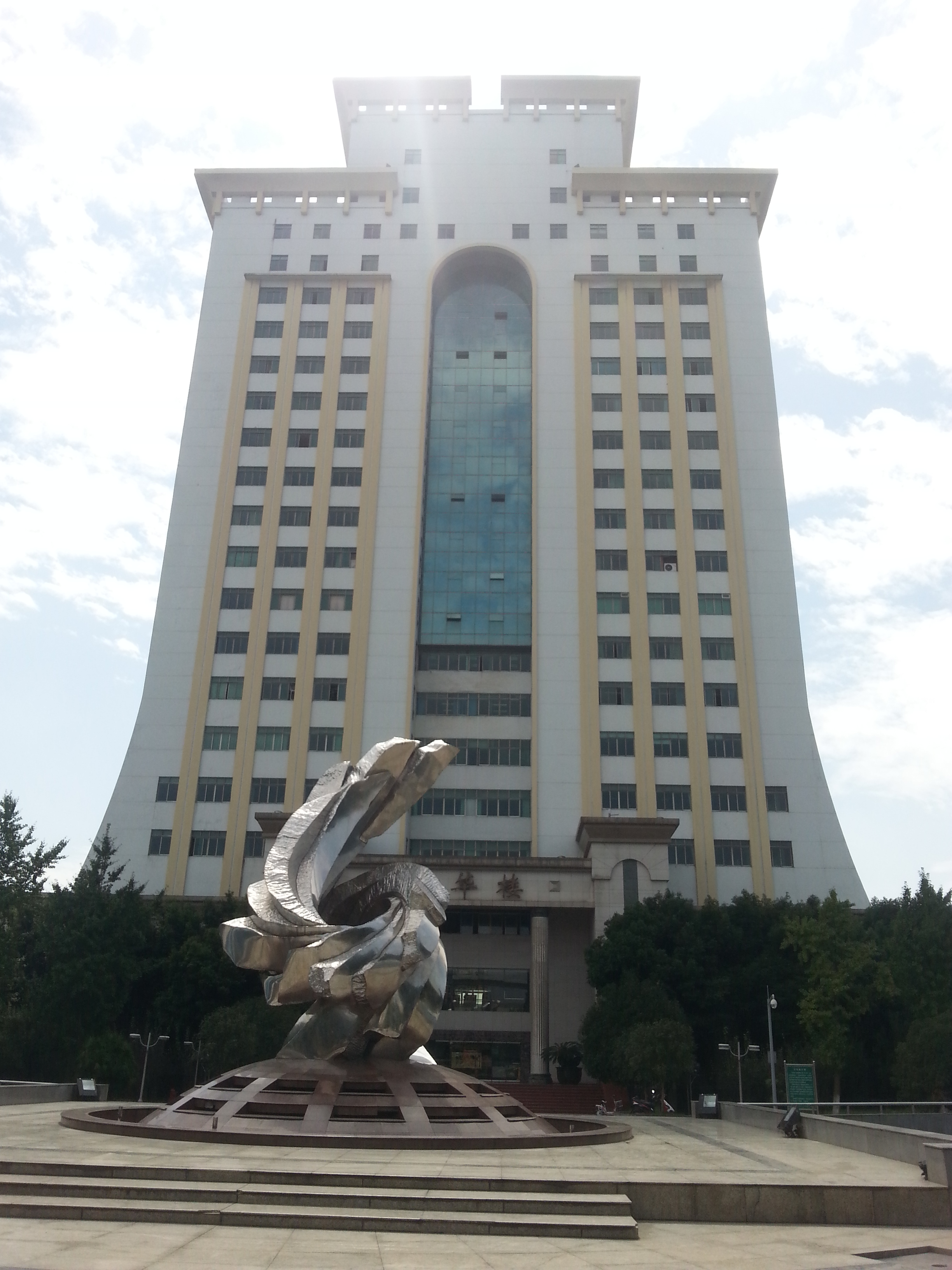
Guanghua campus main building

- Liulin Campus (Main Campus): Founded in 2004, approximately 264 acres (107 ha) in Wenjiang, Chengdu, Sichuan
- Guanghua Campus: Founded in 1938, approximately 116 acres (47 ha) in Qingyang, Chengdu, Sichuan

== Organization and administration ==
=== Schools ===
- SWUFE's Schools
- School of Finance
- School of Accounting
- School of Business Administration
- School of Securities and Futures
- School of Insurance
- Research Institute of Economics and Management
- School of Statistics
- School of Marxism
- School of International Business
- School of Humanities
- School of Continuing (On-line) Education
- Institute of Economic Mathematics
- College of International Education
- School of Economic Information and Engineering
- School of Humanities and General Education
- School of Public Finance and Taxation
- School of Economics
- School of Law
- School of Public Administration
- School of Foreign Language for Business
- Study Abroad Institute

== Research ==
=== Institute of Financial Studies ===
The IFS was established on July 29, 2010. The research institute is dedicated to generating knowledge of international financial studies and the financial development in China. The director of the institute is Philip H. Dybvig. Dybvig is well known for publishing the Diamond–Dybvig model together with Douglas W. Diamond in 1983.

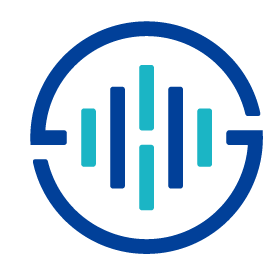
Logo of CHFS

=== China Household Finance Survey ===
The Survey and Research Center of the China Household Finance Survey is a non-profit academic institution of survey and research established in 2010 by the Research Institute of Economics and Management at SWUFE. Within a few years, it has been established as an academic survey institute with comprehensive micro data, including three databases on the household finance of private Chinese households, small and micro enterprises, and community governance. The center provides CHFS data to registered users for the purpose of facilitating scientific and policy research.

=== Institute of Western China Economic Studies ===
The institute has three doctoral research fields: Demography; Population, Resources and Environmental Economics; Agricultural Economics.

== Rankings and reputation ==
Among universities specialized in finance, business, and economics, as of 2024, Southwestern University of Finance and Economics ranked 4th nationwide and # 1 in Western China with a combination of almost 300 million population.

University rankings

Regional – Overall
- QS Asia: =373 (2025)

SWUFE is considered one of the best universities in China in "Economics and Business" related subjects according to several widely cited international rankings, including Shanghai Ranking, U.S. News Rankings, URAP ranking and NTU Ranking.

The QS World University Rankings ranked SWUFE 373rd in Asia in 2025.

As of 2025, Southwestern University of Finance and Economics was ranked the best in Asia and 8th globally in "Economics and Business" by URAP ranking. Internationally, the U.S. News & World Report ranks Southwestern University of Finance and Economics at 3rd in China, 4th in Asia and 17th globally in Business and Economics. As of 2023, according to the Academic Ranking of World Universities, Southwestern University of Finance and Economics ranked amongst the top # 32 universities in the world for "Finance", and #45 for "Economics", amongst #76 universities in the world for "Management" and # 101 universities globally in "Business Administration".

== Libraries and museums ==
=== Library ===
Southwestern University of Finance and Economics (SWUFE) Library was founded in 1952. The total building area amounts to 50,000 square metres (540,000 sq ft). The collection has reached 2,000,000 items in digital resources, making it the biggest library in the southwest of China. In May 2002, a Translation Center was set up to provide services for overseas communication and editing and publishing the English version of SWUFE's The Economist.

=== Money and Securities Museum ===
The university's "Money and Securities Museum" was established in 1998 and is one of the earliest of its kind to have on exhibition various real financial items such as currencies, securities, certificates and cards pertaining to planned and market economies. Over 60,000 items have been on exhibition in the 700-square-metre (7,500 sq ft) hall.

== International relations ==
The university also has four bachelor's degree programs and two master's degree programs delivered completely in English and these programs have trained several thousand foreign students from over a hundred countries.

SWUFE has established cooperative relations with 130 universities, financial institutes and enterprises from 36 countries and regions, including Austria, Australia, Brazil, Canada, Chile, France, Germany, Israel, Japan, Netherlands, Portugal, Russia, Slovenia, United Kingdom and the United States.

== Notable alumni ==
- Jiang Chaoliang (Former Governor of Jilin Province, Former Chairman of Agricultural Bank of China)
- Li Ruogu (Former chairman and president of the Exim Bank of China)
- Liu Jiayi (Secretary, Provincial Committee of CPC, Shandong Province, Former Auditor general of the National Audit Office of the People's Republic of China)
- Shang Fulin (Vice Director, Economic Policy Committee of CPPCC, Former Chairman of China Banking Regulatory Commission)
- Wei Hong (Former governor of Sichuan)
- Yang Rong, Chinese-born automotive tycoon
- Zhang Zhan (Former lawyer and citizen journalist)

== Student life ==
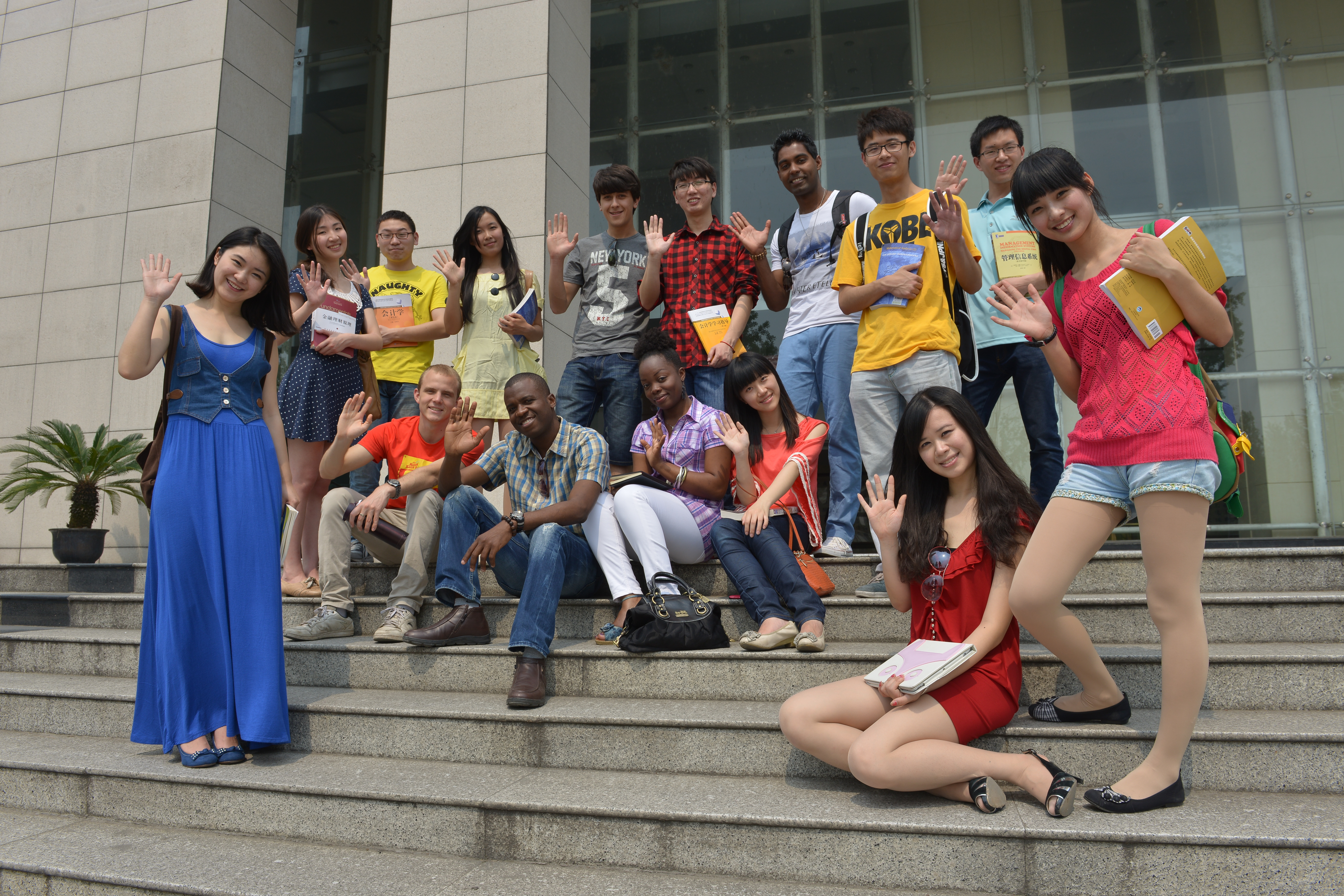
SWUFE students

=== Student associations ===
Southwestern University of Finance and Economics has 100 student associations (excluding student associations sponsored by enterprises) covering five domains: thoughts and theories, academic and technology, arts and culture, physical training, public welfare and practice and communication. To name a few: the Research on Philosophy Club, MUN, Starting Point Drama Club, Hip-pop, Green Development Association, Oracle Club, Pre Guide for Career magazine, etc.

== See also ==
- Education in the People's Republic of China
- Applied economics
- List of EQUIS accredited institutions
