= China Household Finance Survey =

The China Household Finance Survey (CHFS) is conducted by the China Family Finance Survey and Research Center, a non-profit academic institution established by Southwestern University of Finance and Economics. The first survey was completed in 2011, and a 6th survey is currently in its 2nd phase. Survey samples are distributed in 29 provinces and more than 260 counties (districts and county-level cities), covering about 26,000 households.

The survey collects information about housing, assets, debt and credit, income and expenditure, social security and insurance, intergenerational transfer payments, demographic characteristics, employment status, and more.

The 2013 survey found income and asset distribution to be highly uneven across the country, with the median income in rural areas well below that in the city.

== History and mission ==
The Survey and Research Center for China Household Finance was established in 2010 as a non-profit academic research institution. Based out of Southwestern University of Finance and Economics and the Research Institute of Economics and Management, the center's primary objective is to conduct the nationally representative China Household Finance Survey (CHFS). Two rounds of the survey were successfully completed before 2015, and the next round is scheduled for summer 2015.

CHFS gathers micro-level financial information about Chinese households across the country. This includes information about housing and financial assets, liabilities and credit restraints, income and expenditures, social security and insurance, employment status and payment habits, among other aspects. The collected data serves as an information resource for domestic and foreign researchers studying China's socioeconomic landscape and global socioeconomic conditions.

== Sample design and survey implementation ==
=== First Round: 2011 Survey ===
The primary sampling units were taken from 2,585 counties (including counties, districts and county-level cities) all over the country with the exceptions of Tibet, Xinjiang, Inner Mongolia, Hong Kong, Macao, and Taiwan.

The project employed a stratified three-stage probability proportion to size (PPS) random sample design. The first stage of sampling uses counties; the second stage of sampling uses residential communities from the counties; the final stage of sampling uses extracted households from the neighborhoods and village committees. Each stage of sampling was implemented using the PPS sampling method, weighted by its population size. Interviews were carried out by students from Southwestern University of Finance and Economics (SWUFE). Each student was required to complete 56 hours of training and pass an exam before being allowed to participate. Households drawn in the sample had to refuse to be interviewed three times or be unavailable six times before being excluded from the survey. Local community representatives were extremely supportive of the project.

The first round of the CHFS was completed in August 2011 in 25 provinces, 80 counties, and 320 communities throughout the country. The total sample size was 8,438 households and 29,450 individuals.

=== Second Round: 2013 Survey ===
In 2013, the survey experienced a large expansion. The primary sampling unit (PSU) covered cities and counties all over the country except for Tibet, Xinjiang, Hong Kong, Macao, and Taiwan. The sampling design allowed the data to be not only nationally representative, but also provincially representative.

The second round of CHFS was completed in August 2013 in 262 counties (areas and cities at the county level), and 1,048 village communities, with a sample scope of more than 28,000 households.

=== Third Round: 2015 Survey ===
The third round of the China Household Finance Survey will be conducted in summer 2015 and expanded to approximately 35,000 households.

=== Quarterly Telephone Survey ===
CHFS accessed households' phone numbers in order to conduct quarterly follow-up interviews. These follow-up interviews are conducted using Computer Assisted Telephone Interviews (CATI) (see 3.2). The CATI questionnaire includes: expectations about housing and stock prices; employment status; financial market participation and earning status; and income and expenditures.

== Data processing ==
=== CAPI and CATI ===
CHFS developed a proprietary interview system and management platform for both face-to-face interviews and for telephone interviews. This integrated system provides a full package for each computer-based household interview. The Computer-assisted personal interviewing (CAPI) system effectively decreases potential man-made non-sampling errors by presetting the range of possible answers, catching typing errors, and avoiding general human errors (such as skipping questions). The system ensures the confidentiality of the data and ensures real-time accessibility, significantly improving data quality.

Computer-assisted telephone interviewing (CATI) is an interactive front-end computer system that allows interviewers to ask questions via computer rather than over the telephone. This system saves time, decreases costs, and helps guarantees high quality data.

=== Quality Control ===
In addition to using computer-assisted personal interviewing (CAPI), the project also designed a more comprehensive quality assurance system in order to reduce problems caused by human error. First, interviews must be refused three times or unanswered six times before the interviewer can go about overseeing a replacement sample. Doing this ensures maximum representativeness and randomness by minimizing the interviewers' opportunities to disregard samples that are difficult to interview by replacing samples that are easier to work with.

Second, having the data returned in a timely manner is also necessary to satisfy supporting staff's access to continued real-time analysis and verify the quality requirements. All data is required to be transmitted back to the home office on the same day.

=== Refusal Rate ===
When compared to similar domestic and international surveys, CHFS has an impressively low refusal rate of 11.6% in 2011. The urban samples' refusal rate was 16.5% and the rural samples' was 3.2%. In 2013, the overall refusal rate went further down to 10.9%, with urban and rural refusal rate being 15.4% and 0.9%, respectively.

== Main findings ==
=== Gini Coefficient ===
According to the CHFS data, in 2010 the household income Gini coefficient was 0.61. Urban China had a 0.58 Gini coefficient while rural China had a Gini coefficient of 0.61. In 2012, the household income Gini coefficient remained at 0.61, as the urban and rural areas had Gini coefficients of 0.59 and 0.58 in 2012, respectively.

=== Household Assets ===
The distribution of household assets in China is extremely uneven. In 2013, the median of Chinese household assets was 256,000 RMB. From a national perspective, 10% of households had less than 20,000 RMB in assets and 10% of household had more than 1.57 million RMB in assets. In urban areas, 10% of household assets had less than 30,000 RMB in assets and 10% of household assets had more than 2.27 million in assets; there was a median of 441,000 RMB. In rural areas 10% of household had less than 15,000RMB in assets, 10% of households had more than the 621,000 RMB in assets, and there was a median of 131,000 RMB.

=== Vacancy Rate ===
According to CHFS data, in 2011 the overall vacancy rate in urban areas was 20.6%. In 2013 this figure rose to 22.4%. According to estimates, in 2013 there were approximately 50 million vacant housing units in urban areas all over the nation.

=== Credit Access Rate ===
On average, 18.4% of households had a formal credit demand. Of this, 40.5% of them are met, i.e., the credit access rate for Chinese households is 40.5%. In rural China, 19.6% of households had a formal credit demand while only 27.6% were satisfied. Small and micro-enterprises and individual business with formal credit demands had a credit access rate is 46.2%.

== Impact on society and policy ==
The center wrote a series of reports based on CHFS data that explored the condition of Chinese assets, including income distribution; analysis of the supply and demand of real estate; urbanization; small and micro businesses; and other aspects of Chinese household finance and active suggestions for the related parties. CHFS also wrote and released Data You Need to Know about China: Research Report on the China Household Finance Survey in addition to other writings, arousing widespread interest in academia, government, and industry. On May 31, 2014, Science magazine in the U.S. published the data in issue 304 and its research team conducted a lengthy report ("The Numbers Game," Science; volume 340, pp. 1037–1039).

Based on preliminary analysis of the data's conclusions, the center continued releasing five rounds of data from May – December 2012 and in April and June 2014. It had a greater impact on society than expected.

The publications and data have been covered by numerous media sources, both domestic and international, including the Wall Street Journal, The Economist, CNN, and many more.

== Plans ==
The third round of the survey is scheduled for implementation in summer 2015. The size and scope of the sample will be expanded considerably. Meanwhile, surveys on small and medium-sized enterprises and the finances of China's grass-roots organizations will be conducted at the same time. The center plans to conduct monthly telephone interviews beginning in 2015.
