= Ni Hong (politician) =

Chinese politician

- 倪虹
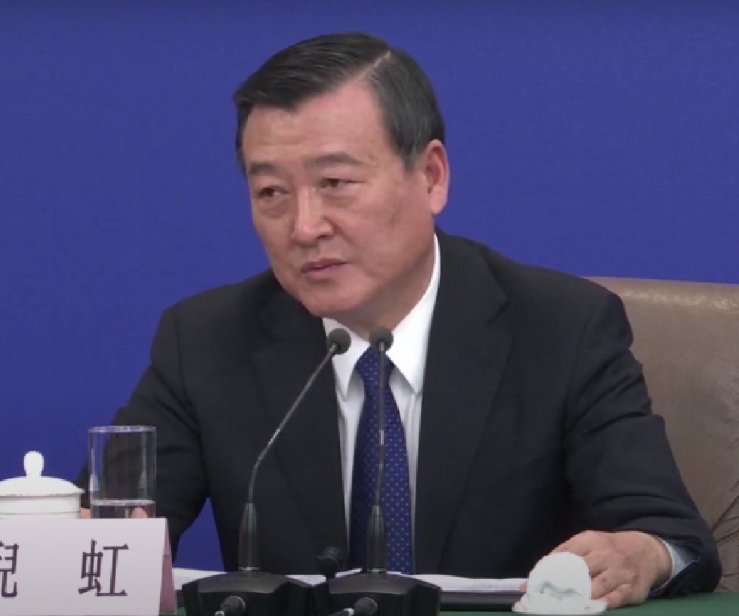
- Ni in 2024

Minister of Housing and Urban–Rural Development
- Incumbent
- Assumed office 24 June 2022
- Premier: Li Keqiang; Li Qiang
- Preceded by: Wang Menghui

Personal details
- Born: October 1962 (age 63–64) Anshan, Liaoning, China
- Party: Communist Party
- Education: Harbin Institute of Technology

Ni Hong (Chinese: 倪虹; pinyin: Ní Hóng; born October 1962) is a Chinese politician who is the current Minister of Housing and Urban–Rural Development, in office since June 2022.

He was a representative of the 19th National Congress of the Chinese Communist Party.

== Biography ==
Ni was born in Anshan, Liaoning, in October 1962. After resuming the national college entrance examination, in 1979, he entered the Harbin Institute of Architectural Engineering (now Harbin Institute of Technology), majoring in industrial and civil buildings.

He joined the Chinese Communist Party (CCP) in July 1983, on the verge of graduation. After graduating in 1983, he was assigned to the Village and Town Construction Department of the Ministry of Construction.

In April 1996, he became assistant mayor of Hefei, capital of east China's Anhui province, and was elevated to vice mayor in August 1999. He was appointed party branch secretary of Anhui Provincial Department of Construction (later reshuffled as Anhui Provincial Department of Housing and Urban–Rural Development) in December 2002, concurrently serving as director since January 2006.

He was recalled to the Ministry of Housing and Urban–Rural Development and appointed director of Housing Reform and Development Division in December 2010. He moved up the ranks to become vice minister in June 2015 and minister in June 2022.

=== As Housing Minister ===
In March 2024, as China's property crisis worsened with domestic property giant China Vanke coming under pressure to repay its private debts, Ni, in a press briefing, reiterated a stance that homes are "for living in, not for speculation."

In October 2024, China declared its property sector to have "bottomed out" and pledged a funding boost of 4 trillion yuan (562.18 billion USD). During a ministry press conference, Ni emphasized positive signs of recovery, noting encouraging home purchase data. He stated that Beijing will increase its loan pool for pre-qualified projects and developers from 2.23 trillion yuan to 4 trillion yuan by year-end.

Government offices
| Preceded by Xie Zhiping | Director of Anhui Provincial Department of Construction; 2006–2011 | Succeeded by Li Ming |
| Preceded by Wang Menghui | Minister of Housing and Urban–Rural Development; 2022–present | Incumbent |
