= Wang Xiaodong (born 1960) =

Chinese politician

- 王晓东

Governor of Hubei
- In office 14 September 2016 – 7 May 2021
- Leader: Jiang Chaoliang → Ying Yong (Party secretary)
- Preceded by: Wang Guosheng
- Succeeded by: Wang Zhonglin

Personal details
- Born: 3 January 1960 (age 66) Xinfeng County, Jiangxi
- Party: Chinese Communist Party
- Education: Jiangxi University

Chinese name
- Simplified Chinese: 王晓东
- Traditional Chinese: 王曉東
Transcriptions
Standard Mandarin
- Hanyu Pinyin: Wáng Xiǎodōng

Wang Xiaodong (Chinese: 王晓东; born 3 January 1960) is a Chinese politician who served as the Chinese Communist Party Deputy Committee Secretary and Governor of Hubei from 2016 to 2021. Originally from Jiangxi province, Wang spent his early career in his home province and in Guizhou. He was transferred to Hubei in 2011.

== Biography ==
Wang was born in Xinfeng County, Jiangxi province. Wang joined the Chinese Communist Party in January 1983. He graduated from Jiangxi University with a degree in Marxist philosophy. He began his career in rural work in Jiangxi province, then worked as a party functionary in the General Office of the Jiangxi party committee, the Jiangxi social and education commission, the provincial policy research office, and the director of the Guizhou party general office. He became a member of the Guizhou party standing committee in December 2000 while Chinese Communist Party Committee Secretary of Guiyang, then in May 2007 became executive deputy governor of Guizhou.

In December 2011 he became a member of the Hubei party standing committee, then named executive deputy governor of Hubei. In April 2016 he was named Chinese Communist Party Deputy Committee Secretary of Hubei. After serving for over 16 years in a deputy provincial-ministerial position, Wang was elevated to acting governor of Hubei in September 2016.

As the deputy secretary and governor of Hubei Province, Wang has been involved in mitigating the COVID-19 pandemic.

On 23 June 2021, he was transferred to Beijing and appointed deputy director of the Agricultural and Rural Committee of the National Committee of the Chinese People's Political Consultative Conference.

== Downfall ==
On 17 May 2026, Wang was put under investigation for alleged "serious violations of discipline and laws" by the Central Commission for Discipline Inspection (CCDI), the party's internal disciplinary body, and the National Supervisory Commission, the highest anti-corruption agency of China.
