= Zeng Wei =

Chinese politician

Zeng Wei (Chinese: 曾维; born December 1956) is a Chinese politician from Liaoning province. He was the Chinese Communist Party Committee Secretary of Shenyang, the capital of Liaoning province, from 2008 to 2016. Born in Xifeng County near the city of Tieling, Zeng joined the workforce in August 1974 spent his entire career in his native province. In January 2008 he was named party chief of Shenyang. In July 2015, he was promoted to Deputy Party Secretary of Liaoning.

Zeng is an alternate of the 18th Central Committee of the Chinese Communist Party.
