= Cheng Yongwen =

Chinese politician

- 程用文

Mayor of the Wuhan Municipal People's Government
- Incumbent
- Assumed office 1 February 2021
- Preceded by: Zhou Xianwang

Deputy Mayor of Wuhan
- In office February 2017 – March 2018

Personal details
- Born: July 1965 (age 60) Yangxin County, Hubei, China
- Party: Chinese Communist Party

Cheng Yongwen (Simplified Chinese: 程用文; born in July 1965), is a Chinese politician who is currently the Mayor of the Wuhan Municipal People's Government since 1 February 2021.

== Early life and education ==
Cheng Yongwen was born in July 1965. In September 1982, he entered the Xianning District Finance and Trade School to study corporate financial management.

== Career ==
After graduation in August 1984, he started working in the Xianning District Planning Committee.

He joined the Chinese Communist Party in June 1989.

In December 2016, Cheng Yongwen was transferred to a member of the Party Leadership Group of Wuhan Municipal Government. In February 2017, he was appointed deputy mayor. In May of the same year, he was promoted to a member of the Standing Committee of the Wuhan Municipal Party Committee and concurrently served as secretary of the Party Working Committee of the East Lake New Technology Development Zone.

In March 2018, Cheng Yongwen was transferred to Party Secretary and Director of the Hubei Provincial Development and Reform Commission. On 22 January 2021, the Standing Committee of the 14th Wuhan Municipal People's Congress held its 35th meeting and appointed Cheng Yongwen as deputy mayor, and as acting mayor of the Wuhan Municipal People's Government, replacing Zhou Xianwang who resigned.

On February 1, the sixth session of the 14th Wuhan Municipal People's Congress by-elected Cheng Yongwen as mayor of the Wuhan Municipal People's Government.
