= Jiang Weixin =

Chinese politician

Jiang Weixin (Chinese: 姜伟新; born January 1949) is the former Minister of Housing and Urban-Rural Construction of the People's Republic of China (MOHURD).

Jiang was born in Fuyu County, Heilongjiang, and graduated from Peking University. He joined the Chinese Communist Party in December 1969. He served in the National Development and Reform Commission for many years. He was a member of the 17th Central Committee of the Chinese Communist Party.
