= Agricultural Bank of China =

Strategic state-owned bank

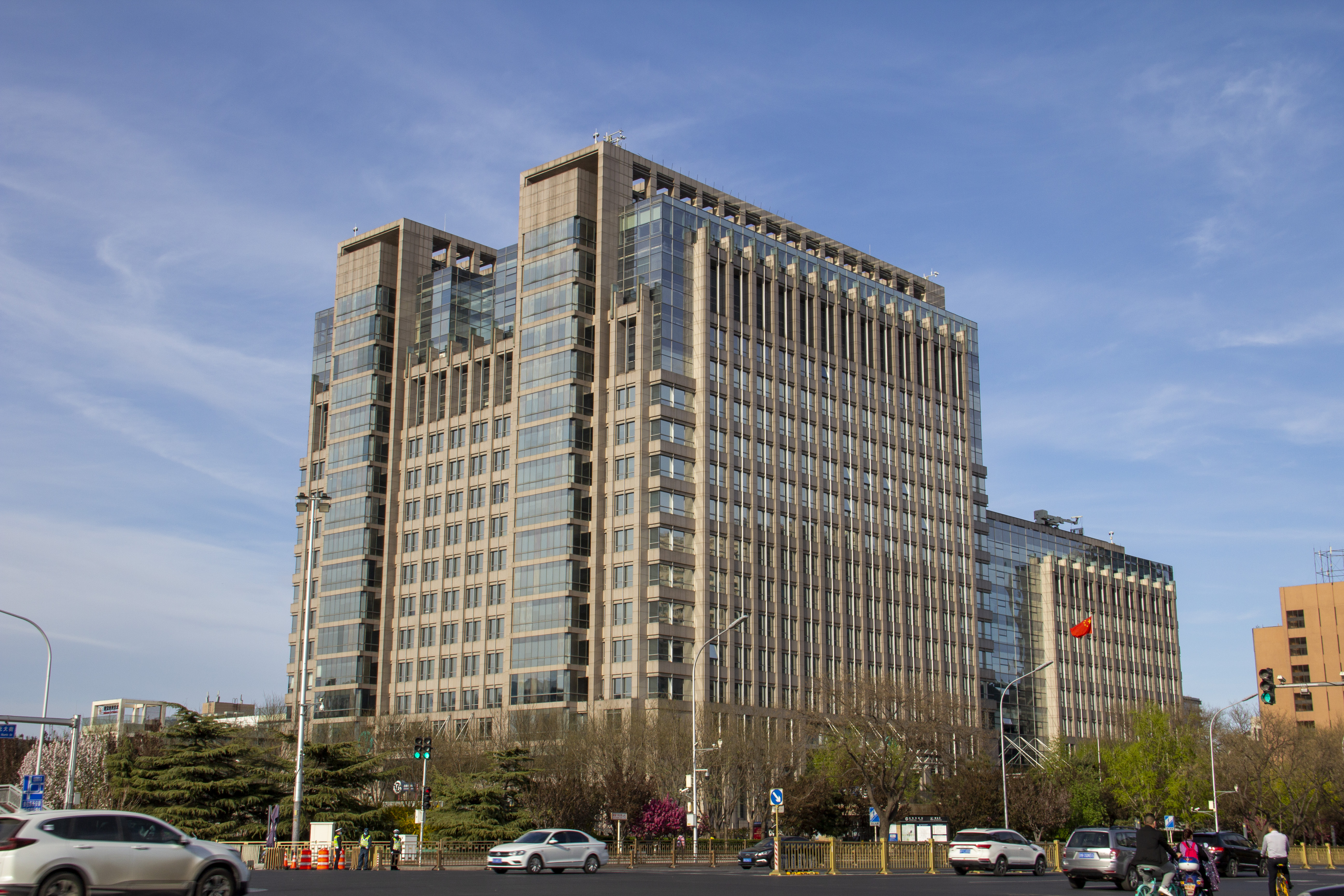
- Headquarters in Beijing, China
- Native name: 中国农业银行
- Type: Public
- Traded as: SSE: 601288 (A ordinary); SSE: 360001 (A preference 1); SSE: 360008 (A preference 2); SEHK: 1288 (H ordinary)
- ISIN: CNE100000RJ0; CNE100000Q43
- Industry: Financial services
- Founded: 10 July 1951; 75 years ago
- Headquarters: Beijing, China
- Key people: Zhao Huan (President)
- Products: Asset management; Banking; Commodities; Credit cards; Equities trading; Insurance; Investment management; Mortgage loans; Private equity; Wealth management
- Revenue: ▲CN¥686.69 billion $99.97 billion (2025)
- Operating income: ▲CN¥731.8 billion $106.54 billion (2025)
- Net income: ▲CN¥303.7 billion $44.21 billion (2025)
- Total assets: ▲CN¥47.20 trillion $6.975 trillion (2026)
- Total equity: ▲CN¥3.063 trillion $446.01 billion (2025)
- Owner: Central Huijin (40.42%); Ministry of Finance (39.21%); National Social Security Fund (3.02%); China Securities Finance (1.92%)
- Number of employees: 454,176 (2025)

Chinese name
- Simplified Chinese: 中国农业银行
- Traditional Chinese: 中國農業銀行
Transcriptions
Standard Mandarin
- Hanyu Pinyin: Zhōngguó Nóngyè Yínháng

Alternative Chinese name
- Simplified Chinese: 农行
- Traditional Chinese: 農行
Transcriptions
Standard Mandarin
- Hanyu Pinyin: Nóngháng
- Website: abchina.com/en/

The Agricultural Bank of China (ABC) is a Chinese largely state-owned multinational banking and financial services corporation headquartered in Beijing, China. It is one of the "big four" banks in China, and the second largest bank in the world by total assets, behind the Industrial and Commercial Bank of China. ABC was founded on 10 July 1951, and has its headquarters in Dongcheng District, Beijing. It has branches throughout mainland China, Hong Kong, London, Tokyo, New York, Frankfurt, Sydney, Seoul, and Singapore.

ABC has 320 million retail customers, 2.7 million corporate clients, and nearly 24,000 branches. It is China's third-largest lender by assets. ABC went public in mid-2010, fetching the world's biggest ever initial public offering (IPO) at the time, since overtaken by the Saudi Arabian state-run petroleum enterprise, Saudi Aramco. In 2011, it ranked eighth among the Top 1000 World Banks, by 2015, it ranked third in Forbes' 13th annual Global 2000 list and in 2017 it ranked fifth. In 2023, Agricultural Bank of China was ranked No. 4 in Forbes' Global 2000 (World's Largest Public Companies). It is considered a systemically important bank by the Financial Stability Board.

== History ==
Since the establishment of the People's Republic of China in 1949, ABC has been formed and abolished several times. On 10 July 1951, two banks of the Republic of China, Farmers Bank of China and Cooperation Bank, merged to form the Agricultural Cooperation Bank, which ABC regards as its ancestor. However, the bank was merged into People's Bank of China, the central bank in 1952. The first bank bearing the name Agricultural Bank of China was founded in 1955, but it was merged into the central bank in 1957. In 1963 the Chinese government formed another agricultural bank which was also merged into the central bank two years later. Today's Agricultural Bank of China was founded in February 1979. As the People's Bank of China began spinning off its commercial banking functions after 1978, ABC's focus on providing farmers with financial services increased.

ABC was restructured to form a holding company called Agricultural Bank of China Limited. It was listed on the Shanghai and Hong Kong stock exchanges in July 2010.

In 2012, ABC started a project to migrate to the Avaloq Banking System.

The Agricultural Bank of China halted business with a North Korean bank accused by the United States of financing Pyongyang's missile and nuclear programs.

In 2023, the asset management division of Agricultural Bank of China ABC WM together with BNP Paribas Asset Management launched an asset management joint venture. BNP Paribas ABC Wealth is majority owned by BNPP AM (51%), ABC Wealth Management holds 49%. Alexandre Werno became the CEO.

As of 2024, Agricultural Bank of China continues to operate in Russia despite international sanctions imposed following Russia's invasion of Ukraine. While many Western financial institutions have withdrawn from the Russian market, Chinese banks, including AgBank, have expanded their operations and influence, quadrupling their credit commitments to Russian banks by March 2023. ABC together with the Industrial and Commercial Bank of China (ICBC), the Bank of China and the China Construction Bank increased their joint commitment to Russia by $2.2 billion within 14 months of the launch of the Russian attack on Ukraine, reaching 9.7 billion dollars. This financial support, largely conducted in yuan rather than dollars or euros, aligns with Beijing's broader strategy to promote its currency as an alternative to the U.S. dollar. Critics argue that such actions undermine international efforts to isolate Russia economically and indirectly enable its continued aggression against Ukraine.

== Incidents ==
In April 2007, ABC was the victim of the largest bank theft in Chinese history. This occurred when two vault managers at a branch in Handan, Hebei embezzled almost 51 million yuan (US$7.5 million).

== 2010 initial public offering ==
ABC was the last of the "big four" banks in China to go public. In 2010, A shares and H shares of Agricultural Bank of China were listed on the Shanghai Stock Exchange and the Hong Kong Stock Exchange respectively. Each share was set to cost between 2.7RMB and 3.3RMB per share. H shares were set to cost between HK$2.88 and HK$3.48 per share. The final share price for the IPO launch was issued on 7 July 2010. On completion in August 2010 it became the world's biggest initial public offering (IPO) surpassing the one set by Industrial and Commercial Bank of China in 2006 of US$21.9 billion. This record has since been beaten by another Chinese company, Alibaba, in 2014.

ABC raised US$19.21 billion in an IPO in Hong Kong and Shanghai on 6 July 2010, before overallotment options were exercised. On 13 August 2010, ABC officially completed the world's largest initial public offering, raising a total of $22.1 billion after both Shanghai and Hong Kong's over-allotments were fully exercised. The IPO was once thought to be able to raise US$30 billion, but weaker market sentiment dampened the value. Despite a 15-month low for the Chinese benchmark index, the IPO was said to have gone smoothly.

CICC, Goldman Sachs, and Morgan Stanley led the Hong Kong offering, with JPMorgan, Macquarie, Deutsche Bank and ABC's own securities unit also involved. CICC, CITIC Securities, Galaxy and Guotai Junan Securities handled the Shanghai portion. ABC sold about 40% of the Shanghai offering to 27 strategic investors, including China Life Insurance and China State Construction. They were subject to lock-up periods of 12–18 months. Eleven cornerstone investors were selected for its Hong Kong share offering, including Qatar Investment Authority and Kuwait Investment Authority, taking a combined $5.45 billion worth of shares.

On 1 August 2024, Saudi Arabia's Public Investment Fund (PIF) announced MOUs worth $50 billion with six Chinese financial institutions, including the Agricultural Bank of China and Bank of China.

== List of governors ==
Name (English)	Name (Chinese)	Tenure begins	Tenure ends	Note
He Songting	何松亭	July 1951	May 1952	
Qiao Peixin	乔培新	February 1955	August 1955	
Li Shaoyu	李绍禹	August 1955	May 1957	
Hu Jingyun	胡景沄	October 1963	November 1965	
Fang Gao	方皋	June 1979	July 1981	
Li Shaoyu	李绍禹	July 1981	April 1982	
Han Lei	韩雷	April 1982	June 1985	
Ma Yongwei	马永伟	July 1985	June 1994	
Shi Jiliang	史纪良	July 1994	October 1997	
He Linxiang	何林祥	October 1997	February 2000	
Shang Fulin	尚福林	February 2000	December 2002	
Yang Mingsheng	杨明生	September 2003	July 2007	
Xiang Junbo	项俊波	July 2007	January 2009	
Zhang Yun	张云	January 2009	December 2015	
Zhao Huan	赵欢	January 2016	September 2018	
Zhang Qingsong	张青松	November 2019	September 2022	
Fu Wanjun	付万军	December 2022		

== See also ==
- Asset management in China
- Banking in China
  - Policy banks
  - List of banks in China
- List of companies of China
