= Ministry of Housing and Urban–Rural Development =

Chinese government agency

Ministry of Housing and Urban–Rural Development of the People's Republic of China
- 中华人民共和国住房和城乡建设部; Zhōnghuá Rénmín Gònghéguó Zhùfáng Hé Chéngxiāng Jiànshèbù
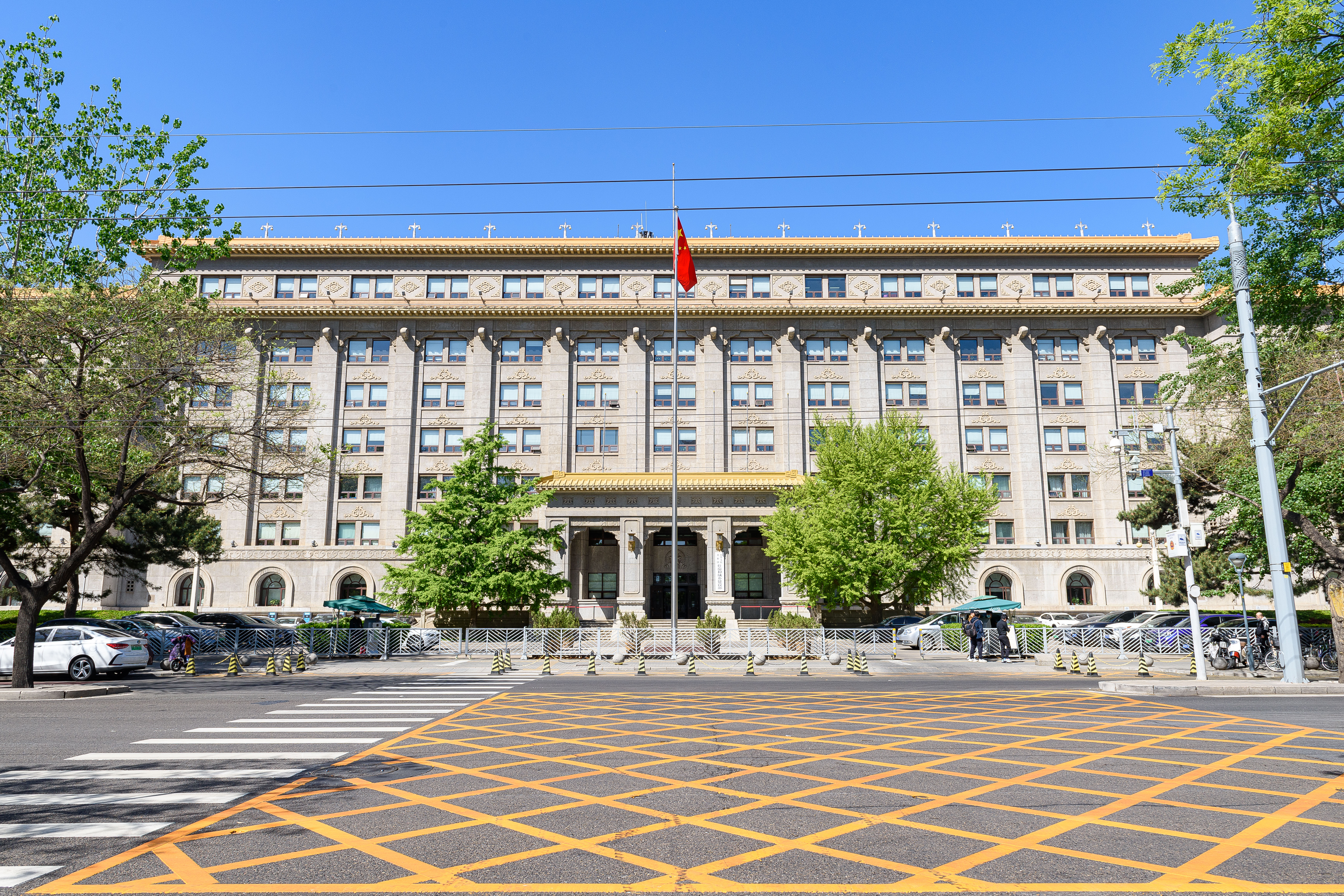

Agency overview
- Formed: 15 March 2008; 18 years ago
- Jurisdiction: Government of China
- Headquarters: Beijing
- Minister responsible: Ni Hong, Minister
- Deputy Ministers responsible: Jiang Wanrong; Dong Jianguo; Qin Haixiang; Wang Hui
- Agency executives: Song Hansong, Leader of Discipline Inspection & Supervision Team; Li Rusheng, Chief Engineer; Yang Baojun, Chief Economist
- Parent agency: State Council
- Website: www.mohurd.gov.cn

Ministry of Housing and Urban–Rural Development
- Simplified Chinese: 中华人民共和国住房和城乡建设部
- Traditional Chinese: 中華人民共和國住房和城鄉建設部
Transcriptions
Standard Mandarin
- Hanyu Pinyin: Zhōnghuá Rénmín Gònghéguó Zhùfánghé Chéngxiāng Jiànshèbù

MOHURD
- Chinese: 住建部
Transcriptions
Standard Mandarin
- Hanyu Pinyin: Zhù Jiànbù

Ministry of Construction
- Simplified Chinese: 中华人民共和国建设部
- Traditional Chinese: 中華人民共和國建設部
Transcriptions
Standard Mandarin
- Hanyu Pinyin: Zhōnghuá Rénmín Gònghéguó Jiànshè Bù

The Ministry of Housing and Urban–Rural Development is a ministry of the People's Republic of China which provides housing and regulates state construction activities in mainland China.

== History ==
It was formerly known as the Ministry of Construction (Chinese: 建设部; pinyin: Jiànshèbù).

As part of US$586 billion economic stimulus package of November 2008, the government plans to:

- Housing: increase the construction of more affordable and low-rent housing and the speeding up of slum demolition, to initiate a pilot program to rebuild rural homes, and a program to encourage nomads to move into permanent housing.
- Rural infrastructure: improve roads and power grids in the countryside, and drinking water, including a huge project to divert water from the South to the North of China. Also, poverty relief initiatives will be strengthened.

In November 2012, the Ministry established its smart cities pilot program, which became the start of a nationwide smart cities movement. From 2013 to 2015, 277 Chinese cities joined the smart cities pilot program. As of 2016, there were approximately 500 smart city projects in China.

== See also ==
- Urban Planning Society of China
- Ministries of China
