= Xiang Junbo =

Chinese banker

Xiang Junbo (Chinese: 项俊波; born 1957) is the former chairman of the China Insurance Regulatory Commission (CIRC).

He was previously chairman of the Agricultural Bank of China Limited (starting in January 2009). He obtained a Ph.D. in law from Peking University.

In February 2014, The New York Times reported that Xiang made a direct job plea to JPMorgan Chase Chief Jamie Dimon for daughter of a close friend.

On April 9, 2017, Xiang was placed under investigation by the Central Commission for Discipline Inspection of the Chinese Communist Party for "serious violations of regulations". Xiang was expelled from the Communist Party on September 23, 2017.

In 2019, he was jailed for bribery.
