= Hubei Provincial People's Government =

Provincial government in China

Hubei Provincial People's Government 湖北省人民政府
- Established: May 20, 1949; 77 years ago

Leadership
- Governor: Li Dianxun; 2 January 2025
- Parent body: Central People's Government; Hubei Provincial People's Congress
- Elected by: Hubei Provincial People's Congress

Meeting place
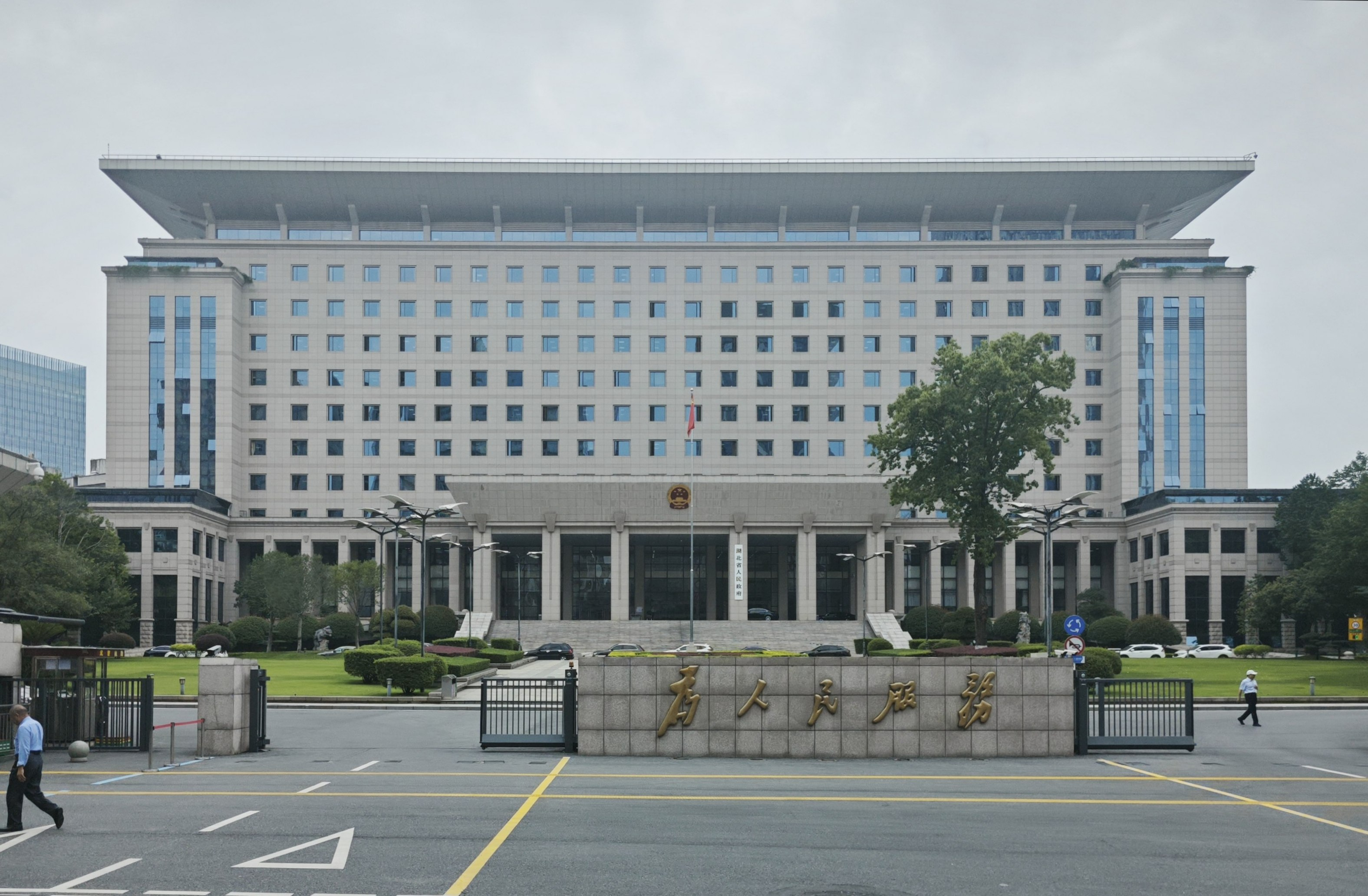
- Headquarters

Website
- www.hubei.gov.cn

The Hubei Provincial People's Government is the local administrative agency of Hubei. It is officially elected by the Hubei Provincial People's Congress and is formally responsible to the Hubei Provincial People's Congress and its Standing Committee. Under the country's one-party system, the governor is subordinate to the secretary of the Hubei Provincial Committee of the Chinese Communist Party. The Provincial government is headed by a governor, currently Li Dianxun.

== History ==
=== Republic of China era (1911–1949) ===
In October 1911, after the success of the Wuchang Uprising, the Hubei Military Government was established. In April 1912, the Beiyang Government of the Republic of China was established and the Hubei Provincial Administrative Office was established. In May 1914, the Hubei Provincial Inspectorate was established. In July 1916, it was renamed the Hubei Provincial Governor's Office. In October 1926, after the victory of the Northern Expedition of the National Revolutionary Army, the National Government established the Hubei Provincial Government of the Republic of China.

In February 1949, the Central Plains Bureau of the Central Committee of the Chinese Communist Party proposed the idea of establishing provincial committees, provincial people's governments and provincial military regions in Hubei, Henan and Anhui provinces at a meeting in Shangqiu, Henan. In March, the Second Plenary Session of the 7th Central Committee of the Chinese Communist Party was held in Xibaipo. During the meeting, Mao Zedong talked with Li Xiannian and decided to appoint Li Xiannian back to Hubei to take charge of all party, government and military work in Hubei. On March 6, the Central Plains Provisional People's Government was established in Kaifeng, Henan. In late March, Deng Zihui and Li Xiannian, leaders of the Central Plains Bureau and the Central Plains Provisional Government, met with Wang Hongkun, commander of the Tongbai Military Region, and other leading cadres in Kaifeng to discuss the establishment of the Hubei Provincial Committee of the Chinese Communist Party, the Provincial People's Government and the Hubei Military Region. At that time, the CCP regime had the Hubei-Henan Liberated Area and the Jianghan Liberated Area in Hubei Province.

=== People's Republic of China era (1949–present) ===
In April 1949, the People's Liberation Army launched the Battle of Crossing the Yangtze River. On May 16 and 17, the People's Liberation Army took over the three towns of Wuhan. Soon after, Wuhan City was established and the Wuhan Municipal People's Government was established. At that time, Huayuan Town, Xiaogan County (now Xiaochang County ), located at the intersection of Hubei Hubei -Henan Liberated Area, Jianghan Liberated Area, and Henan Tongbai Liberated Area, became the administrative center of the CCP in Hubei. On May 20, the Hubei Provincial Committee of the Chinese Communist Party, the Provincial People's Government and the Hubei Military Region were established in Huayuan Town. Li Xiannian served as the Secretary of the Provincial Party Committee, Chairman of the Provincial Government, and Commander and Political Commissar of the Provincial Military Region. From May to June, the main leaders of the three major organs of the Party, government and military in Hubei lived and worked in a private house in Sunjiafan, Huayuan Town (now the Sunjiafan Revolutionary Site ). Soon, the leading organs of the Party, government and military in Hubei moved to Wuhan City.

In April 1950, the Hubei Provincial People's Government was reorganized into the Hubei Provincial People's Government Committee. In 1954, as Wuhan was downgraded to a city under the jurisdiction of Hubei Province, the Wuhan Municipal People's Government was led by the Hubei Provincial People's Government Committee. In February 1955, the Hubei Provincial People's Government Committee was reorganized into the Hubei Provincial People's Committee.

During the Cultural Revolution, the Hubei Provincial Revolutionary Committee exercised administrative power. In July 1979, the Second Session of the Fifth National People's Congress passed a new " Local Organization Law ", which stipulated that local governments at all levels should be established as the executive organs of the people's congresses at all levels and the local state administrative organs. In January 1980, the Second Session of the Fifth Hubei Provincial People's Congress elected 57 members of the Standing Committee of the Provincial People's Congress, Chen Pixian as the director, Xia Shihou and 14 others as vice-chairmen, and Ma Da and 42 others as members. The Standing Committee elected the Hubei Provincial People's Government. On January 21, 1980, the provincial government issued a notice that the seal of the Hubei Provincial People's Government would be used from that day on, and the seal of the original Hubei Provincial Revolutionary Committee would be invalidated at the same time. Han Ningfu was appointed governor. In August 1982, Han Ningfu resigned from the post of governor. On August 21, the Fifth Hubei Provincial People's Congress held its 17th session and decided to accept Han Ningfu's resignation request and replace him with Huang Zhizhen.

== Organization ==
The organization of the Hubei Provincial People's Government includes:

- General Office of the Hubei Provincial People's Government

=== Component Departments ===
- Hubei Provincial Development and Reform Commission
- Hubei Provincial Department of Education
- Hubei Provincial Department of Science and Technology
- Hubei Provincial Department of Economy and Information Technology
- Hubei Provincial Ethnic and Religious Affairs Committee
- Hubei Provincial Public Security Department
- Hubei Provincial Department of Civil Affairs
- Hubei Provincial Department of Justice
- Hubei Provincial Department of Finance
- Hubei Provincial Department of Human Resources and Social Security
- Hubei Provincial Department of Natural Resources
- Hubei Provincial Department of Ecology and Environment
- Hubei Provincial Department of Housing and Urban-Rural Development
- Hubei Provincial Department of Transportation
- Hubei Provincial Water Resources Department
- Hubei Provincial Department of Agriculture and Rural Affairs
- Hubei Provincial Department of Commerce
- Hubei Provincial Department of Culture and Tourism
- Hubei Provincial Health Commission
- Hubei Provincial Department of Veterans Affairs
- Hubei Provincial Emergency Management Department
- Hubei Provincial Audit Office

=== Directly affiliated special institution ===
- State-owned Assets Supervision and Administration Commission of Hubei Provincial People's Government

=== Organizations under the government ===
- Hubei Provincial Administration for Market Regulation
- Hubei Provincial Radio and Television Bureau
- Hubei Provincial Sports Bureau
- Hubei Provincial Bureau of Statistics
- Hubei Provincial Medical Insurance Bureau
- Hubei Provincial National Defense Mobilization Office
- Research Office of Hubei Provincial People's Government
- Hubei Provincial Rural Revitalization Bureau
- Hubei Provincial Government Affairs Bureau
- Hubei Provincial Public Resources Transaction Supervision and Management Bureau
- Hubei Provincial Data Bureau

=== Directly affiliated institutions ===
- Hubei Academy of Social Sciences
- Hubei Academy of Agricultural Sciences
- Hubei Provincial Drug Rehabilitation Administration
- Hubei Provincial People's Government Big Data Center
- Hubei Radio and Television

=== Departmental management organization ===
- The Hubei Provincial Government Affairs Administration Office is managed by the General Office of the Provincial Government.
- The Hubei Provincial Grain Bureau is managed by the Provincial Development and Reform Commission.
- The Hubei Provincial Energy Bureau is managed by the Provincial Development and Reform Commission.
- The Hubei Provincial Prison Administration Bureau is managed by the Provincial Department of Justice.
- Hubei Provincial Forestry Bureau is managed by the Provincial Department of Natural Resources.
- The Hubei Provincial Drug Administration is managed by the Provincial Market Supervision Bureau.
- The Hubei Provincial Intellectual Property Office is managed by the Provincial Market Supervision Bureau.

=== Dispatched agency ===
- Hubei Provincial People's Government Office in Beijing
- Hubei Provincial People's Government Office in Shanghai (Jiangsu and Zhejiang)
- Hubei Provincial People's Government Office in Shenzhen
- Hubei Provincial People's Government Office in Xiamen
- Hubei Provincial People's Government Office in Hainan
- Hubei Provincial People's Government Office in Shanxi
- East Lake New Technology Development Zone Management Committee (managed by Wuhan City)
- Wuhan New Port Management Committee (managed by Wuhan Municipal Government)

== See also ==
- Politics of Hubei
  - Hubei Provincial People's Congress
  - Hubei Provincial People's Government
    - Governor of Hubei
  - Hubei Provincial Committee of the Chinese Communist Party
    - Party Secretary of Hubei
  - Hubei Provincial Committee of the Chinese People's Political Consultative Conference
