= Governor of Hubei =

Governor of the Hubei Provincial People's Government
- 湖北省人民政府省长
- National Emblem of China

- Flag of China
- Incumbent; Li Dianxun since 2 January 2025
- Hubei Provincial People's Government
- Type: Governor
- Status: Provincial and ministerial-level official
- Reports to: Hubei Provincial People's Congress and its Standing Committee
- Nominator: Presidium of the Hubei Provincial People's Congress
- Appointer: Hubei Provincial People's Congress
- Term length: Five years, renewable
- Inaugural holder: Li Xiannian
- Formation: May 1949
- Deputy: Deputy Governors; Secretary-General

The governor of Hubei, officially the Governor of the Hubei Provincial People's Government, is the head of Hubei Province and leader of the Hubei Provincial People's Government.

The governor is elected by the Hubei Provincial People's Congress, and responsible to it and its Standing Committee. The governor is a provincial level official and is responsible for the overall decision-making of the provincial government. The governor is assisted by an executive vice governor as well as several vice governors. The governor generally serves as the deputy secretary of the Hubei Provincial Committee of the Chinese Communist Party and as a member of the CCP Central Committee. The governor the second-highest-ranking official in the province after the secretary of the CCP Hubei Committee. The current governor is Li Dianxun, who took office on 2 January 2025.

== List of governors ==
=== People's Republic of China ===
No.	Officeholder	Term of office		Party	Ref.
No.	Officeholder	Took office	Left office	Party	Ref.
Governor of the Hubei Provincial People's Government
1	Li Xiannian (1909–1992)	May 1949	August 1954	Chinese Communist Party	
2	Liu Zihou (1909–2001)	August 1954	January 1955	Chinese Communist Party	
Governor of the Hubei Provincial People's Committee
(2)	Liu Zihou (1909–2001)	January 1955	January 1956	Chinese Communist Party	
3	Zhang Tixue (1915–1973)	January 1956	February 1968	Chinese Communist Party	
Director of the Hubei Revolutionary Committee
4	Zeng Siyu (1911–2012)	February 1968	December 1973	Chinese Communist Party	
5	Zhao Xinchu (1915–1991)	December 1973	August 1978	Chinese Communist Party	
6	Chen Pixian (1916–1995)	August 1978	January 1980	Chinese Communist Party	
Governor of the Hubei Provincial People's Government
7	Han Ningfu (1915–1995)	January 1980	December 1985	Chinese Communist Party	
8	Guo Zhenqian (1933–2019)	December 1985	February 1990	Chinese Communist Party	
9	Guo Shuyan (1935–2022)	February 1990	December 1992	Chinese Communist Party	
10	Jia Zhijie (born 1935)	February 1993	February 1995	Chinese Communist Party	
11	Jiang Zhuping (born 1937)	February 1995	January 2001	Chinese Communist Party	
12	Zhang Guoguang (born 1945)	January 2001	October 2002	Chinese Communist Party	
13	Luo Qingquan (1945–2021)	19 January 2003	6 December 2007	Chinese Communist Party	
14	Li Hongzhong (born 1956)	6 December 2007	26 December 2010	Chinese Communist Party	
15	Wang Guosheng (born 1956)	26 December 2010	28 June 2016	Chinese Communist Party	
16	Wang Xiaodong (born 1960)	14 September 2016	7 May 2021	Chinese Communist Party	
17	Wang Zhonglin (born 1962)	7 May 2021	2 January 2025	Chinese Communist Party	
18	Li Dianxun (born 1967)	2 January 2025	Incumbent	Chinese Communist Party	
