= ZHSS =

ZHSS may refer to:

- Zhonghua Secondary School, a secondary school in Serangoon, Singapore
- ZHSS, the ICAO airport code for Shashi Airport, a defunct airport in Hubei Province, China
