= Li Dianxun =

Chinese politician

- 李殿勋

Governor of Hubei
- Incumbent
- Assumed office 2 January 2025
- Party Secretary: Wang Zhonglin; Guan Zhi'ou
- Preceded by: Wang Zhonglin

Personal details
- Born: November 1967 (age 58–59) Shangcai County, Henan, China
- Party: Chinese Communist Party
- Education: East China Normal University; Southwest University of Political Science and Law

Chinese name
- Simplified Chinese: 李殿勋
- Traditional Chinese: 李殿勛
Transcriptions
Standard Mandarin
- Hanyu Pinyin: Lǐ Diànxūn

Li Dianxun (Chinese: 李殿勋; born November 1967) is a Chinese politician, currently serving as governor of Hubei.

Li was a delegate to the 13th and is a delegate to the 14th National People's Congress. He is an alternate of the 20th Central Committee of the Chinese Communist Party.

== Early life and education ==
Li was born in Shangcai County, Henan, in November 1967. In 1985, he was accepted to East China Normal University, where he majored in history. After graduation in 1989, he went to study at Southwest University of Political Science and Law.

== Career ==
After university in 1991, Li was dispatched as an official to the Legal Affairs Bureau of Chongqing Municipal People's Government, where he finally became director of Legal Affairs Office in February 2003. He joined the Chinese Communist Party (CCP) in June 1994. He was party secretary of Kai County (now Kaizhou District) in March 2009 and subsequently party secretary of Nanchuan District in February 2013. In September 2014, he was made deputy secretary-general of Chongqing Municipal People's Government, a position he held until February 2015, when he was chosen as director of Chongqing Municipal Science and Technology Commission. In January 2018, he rose to become vice mayor of Chongqing, a position at vice-ministerial level.

In May 2019, Li was appointed secretary of the Political and Legal Affairs Commission of the CCP Hunan Provincial Committee and admitted to standing committee member of the CCP Hunan Provincial Committee, the province's top authority. He was elevated to executive vice governor in December 2021 and then deputy party secretary in September 2023.

On 31 December 2024, Li was named deputy party secretary of Hubei, concurrently serving as governor since 2 January 2025.

Party political offices
Preceded by Jiang Youyi	Party Secretary of Kai County; 2009–2013	Succeeded by Li Yinglan
Preceded by Tan Jialing	Party Secretary of Nanchuan District; 2013–2014	Succeeded by Li Mingqing
Preceded by Huang Guanchun	Secretary of the Political and Legal Affairs Commission of the Hunan Provincial Committee of the Chinese Communist Party; 2019–2021	Succeeded by Wei Jianfeng
Preceded by Zhu Guoxian	Specifically-designated Deputy Party Secretary of Hunan; 2023–2024	Succeeded by Xie Weijiang
Government offices
Preceded by Xie Jianhui	Executive Vice Governor of Hunan; 2021–2023	Succeeded by Zhang Yingchun
Preceded by Wang Zhonglin	Governor of Hubei; 2025–present	Incumbent
