= Wu Yongwen =

Chinese politician

- 吴永文

Vice Chairman of the Hubei Provincial People’s Congress
- In office September 2012 – January 2013

Secretary of CPC Hubei Provincial Committee for Political and Legal Affairs
- In office September 2007 – July 2012
- Preceded by: Zheng Shaosan
- Succeeded by: Zhang Chang'er

Communist Party Secretary of Ezhou
- In office March 2006 – September 2007
- Preceded by: Xu Songnan
- Succeeded by: Li Debing

Personal details
- Born: June 1952 (age 74) Jingmen, Hubei
- Party: Chinese Communist Party
- Education: Central China Normal University
- Occupation: Politician

Wu Yongwen
- Traditional Chinese: 吳永文
- Simplified Chinese: 吴永文
Transcriptions
Standard Mandarin
- Hanyu Pinyin: Wú Yǒngwén

Wu Yongwen (born June 1952) is a Chinese politician who spent most of his career in Hubei province. As of January 2013 he was under investigation by the Central Commission for Discipline Inspection. Previously he served as the Vice Chairman of the Hubei Provincial People's Congress.

Chinese media reported that he had close relations with Zhou Yongkang, former Secretary of the Central Political and Legal Affairs Commission.

== Life and career ==
Wu was born and raised in Jingmen, Hubei. He began his political career in August 1968, and joined the Chinese Communist Party (CCP) in January 1975. He spent five years teaching at schools before serving in various administrative and political roles in Jingmen. In December 1997, he was appointed the vice-mayor of Jingmen, and then CCP Deputy Committee Secretary, beginning in June 2000.

From March 2006 to September 2007, he served as the CCP Committee Secretary of Ezhou, the top political position in the city.

In September 2007, he was appointed the Secretary of CCP Hubei Provincial Committee for Political and Legal Affairs; he remained in that position until July 2012, when he was appointed the deputy director of the Standing Committee of Hubei Provincial People's Congress.

On January 20, 2013, he was being investigated by the Party's internal disciplinary body; he was suspected to have been involved in trading political favors for money and for keeping mistresses.

Party political offices
Previous: Zheng Shaosan (郑少三)	Secretary of Political and Legal Affairs Commission of Hubei; September 2007 – July 2012	Next: Zhang Chang'er (张昌尔)
Previous: Xu Songnan (徐松南)	Communist Party Secretary of Ezhou; March 2006 – September 2007	Next: Li Debing (李德炳)
Political offices
Previous: Zheng Shaosan (郑少三)	Head of Hubei Provincial Public Security Department; January 2008 – January 2013	Next: Zeng Xin (曾欣)
Previous: Jiang Daguo (蒋大国)	Head of Hubei Provincial Labor and Social Security Department; January 2003 – March 2006	Next: Shao Hansheng (邵汉生)
