= Han Ningfu =

Chinese politician

Han Ningfu (Chinese: 韩宁夫) (1915–1995) original name Yu Shu (Chinese: 玉树), was a Chinese politician. He was born in Gaotang County, Shandong Province. He was governor of Hubei Province.

Preceded by Chen Pixian	Governor of Hubei	Succeeded by Huang Zhizhen
