= Shashi Airport =

Shashi Airport Shasi Airport
- IATA: SHS; ICAO: ZHSS

Summary
- Airport type: Public
- Serves: Shashi, Hubei, China
- Location: Shashi
- Elevation AMSL: 34 m / 112 ft
- Coordinates: 30°19′20″N 112°16′46″E

Map
- Location of the airport SHS (China)

Runways
Direction	Length		Surface
Direction	m	ft	Surface
04/22	1,800	5,906	Concrete
- Source: GCM, WAD

Shashi Airport
- Traditional Chinese: 沙市機場
- Simplified Chinese: 沙市机场
Transcriptions
Standard Mandarin
- Hanyu Pinyin: Shāshì Jīchǎng

Shashi Airport (IATA: SHS, ICAO: ZHSS) was an airport in Shashi, in Hubei province of central China. The airport closed on May 7, 2002.

== See also ==
- List of airports in China
