= Hubei Provincial Committee of the Chinese Communist Party =

Hubei Provincial Committee of the Chinese Communist Party 中国共产党湖北省委员会

Overview
- Type: Highest decision-making organ when Hubei Provincial Congress is not in session.
- Elected by: Hubei Provincial Congress
- Length of term: Five years
- Term limits: None
- First convocation: October 1921; 104 years ago
- Secretary: Guan Zhi'ou
- Executive organ: Standing Committee
- Inspection organ: Commission for Discipline Inspection

Hubei Provincial Committee of the Chinese Communist Party
- Simplified Chinese: 中国共产党湖北省委员会
- Traditional Chinese: 中國共產黨湖北省委員會
Transcriptions
Standard Mandarin
- Hanyu Pinyin: Zhōngguó Gòngchǎndǎng Húběishěng Wěiyuánhuì

Abbreviation
- Chinese: 中共湖北省委
- Literal meaning: CCP Hubei Provincial Committee
Transcriptions
Standard Mandarin
- Hanyu Pinyin: Zhōnggòng Húběishěng Wěi

The Hubei Provincial Committee of the Chinese Communist Party is the provincial committee of the Chinese Communist Party (CCP) in Hubei, China, and the province's top authority. The committee secretary is the highest ranking post in the province.

== History ==
On March 6, 1949, the Central Plains Provisional People's Government was founded in Kaifeng. On April 22, 1949, the Kaifeng Central Plains Bureau, having recently relocated to Peking, formally dispatched a telegram titled "Hubei Provincial Party Committee Cadres Equipped", recommending Li Xiannian for the position of Hubei Provincial Party Committee Secretary, while appointing Wang Hongkun and Liu Jianxun as the first and second deputy secretaries of the provincial party committee, respectively.

On May 8, 1949, the Central Plains Provisional People's Government convened the second committee meeting, during which it resolved to authorize the establishment of the Hubei Provincial People's Government and the Hubei Military Region. The resolution stated that, to align with the evolving national circumstances and to consolidate leadership throughout Hubei Province, the three district party committees, administrative offices, and military districts established following Liu-Deng army's incursion into the Dabie Mountains—namely Jianghan, Eyu, and Tongbai—would be dissolved immediately. On May 10, under the commission of Li Xiannian, Wang Hongkun convened a meeting at the Sun Jiafan Ancestral Hall garden, where he announced to the attending cadres the establishment of the CCP Hubei Provincial Committee, the Provincial People's Government, and the Hubei Military Region, along with the leadership appointments for the party, government, and military. Li Xiannian was designated as the Secretary of the CCP Hubei Provincial Committee, Chairman of the Hubei Provincial People's Government, and Commander and political commissar of the Hubei Military Region.

On May 12, 1949, the Central Committee of the CPC sanctioned the membership of the Standing Committee of the Hubei Provincial Committee, comprising Li Xiannian, Liu Jianxun, Wang Hongkun, Liu Zihou, Wang Shusheng, Nie Hongjun, and Wang Renzhong. Simultaneously, in accordance with the directive of the Central Military Commission, the Jianghan Military Region, EY Military Region, and Tongbai Military Region constitute a segment of the combined formation of the Hubei Military Region. On May 20, the newly formed Hubei Provincial Party Committee convened a general meeting of all cadres, officially announcing the establishment of the CCP Hubei Provincial Committee, the Provincial People's Government, and the Hubei Military Region.

== Organizations ==
The organization of the Hubei Provincial Committee includes:

- General Office

=== Functional Departments ===
- Organization Department
- Publicity Department
- United Front Work Department
- Political and Legal Affairs Commission
- Social Work Department
- Commission for Discipline Inspection
- Supervisory Commission

=== Offices ===
- Policy Research Office
- Office of the Cyberspace Affairs Commission
- Office of the Foreign Affairs Commission
- Office of the Deepening Reform Commission
- Office of the Institutional Organization Commission
- Office of the Military-civilian Fusion Development Committee
- Taiwan Work Office
- Office of the Leading Group for Inspection Work
- Bureau of Veteran Cadres

=== Dispatched institutions ===
- Working Committee of the Organs Directly Affiliated to the Hubei Provincial Committee

=== Organizations directly under the Committee ===
- Hubei Party School
- Hubei Daily Newspaper Group
- Hubei Institute of Socialism
- Party History Research Office
- Hubei Provincial Archives
- Lecturer Group

=== Organization managed by the work organization ===
- Confidential Bureau

== Leadership ==
=== Heads of the Organization Department ===
| Name (English) | Name (Chinese) | Tenure begins | Tenure ends | Note |
|---|---|---|---|---|
| Song Yuying | 宋育英 | March 1999 | March 2006 | |
| Pan Ligang | 潘立刚 | March 2006 | May 2010 | |
| Hou Chang'an | 侯长安 | July 2010 | April 2012 | |
| Lou Yangsheng | 楼阳生 | March 2012 | June 2014 | |
| He Jiatie | 贺家铁 | September 2014 | January 2016 | |
| Yu Shaoliang | 于绍良 | February 2016 | July 2018 | |
| Wang Ruilian | 王瑞连 | October 2018 | March 2021 | |
| Li Rongcan | 李荣灿 | April 2021 | March 2022 | |
| Zhang Wenbing | 张文兵 | March 2022 | | |

=== Heads of the Publicity Department ===
| Name (English) | Name (Chinese) | Tenure begins | Tenure ends | Note |
|---|---|---|---|---|
| Wang Zhongnong | 王重农 | | September 1998 | |
| Miao Helin | 缪合林 | September 1998 | June 2002 | |
| Zhang Chang'er | 张昌尔 | July 2002 | July 2008 | |
| Li Chunming | 李春明 | July 2008 | July 2010 | |
| Yin Hanning | 尹汉宁 | July 2010 | April 2015 | |
| Liang Weinian | 梁伟年 | April 2015 | April 2017 | |
| Wang Yanling | 王艳玲 | April 2017 | July 2020 | |
| Xu Zhengzhong | 许正中 | July 2020 | May 2023 | |
| Ju Zhaohui | 琚朝晖 | May 2023 | | |

=== Secretaries of the Political and Legal Affairs Commission ===
| Name (English) | Name (Chinese) | Tenure begins | Tenure ends | Note |
|---|---|---|---|---|
| Zheng Shaosan | 郑少三 | May 2003 | September 2007 | |
| Wu Yongwen | 吴永文 | September 2007 | July 2012 | |
| Zhang Chang'er | 张昌尔 | July 2012 | April 2016 | |
| Wang Xiaodong | 王晓东 | April 2016 | July 2017 | |
| Wang Xiangxi | 王祥喜 | July 2017 | March 2019 | |
| Luo Yonggang | 罗永纲 | April 2019 | October 2019 | |
| Xiao Juhua | 肖菊华 | June 2022 | | |

=== Heads of the United Front Work Department ===
| Name (English) | Name (Chinese) | Tenure begins | Tenure ends | Note |
|---|---|---|---|---|
| Tao Changsheng | 穆常生 | February 1986 | April 1993 | |
| Meng Meilu | 蒙美路 | April 1993 | October 1998 | |
| Ji Lingzhi | 纪玲芝 | October 1998 | January 2003 | |
| Su Xiaoyun | 苏晓云 | January 2003 | December 2011 | |
| Zhang Daili | 张岱梨 | December 2011 | April 2015 | |
| Liang Huiling | 梁惠玲 | April 2015 | December 2016 | |
| Erkinjan Turaxun | 尔肯江·吐拉洪 | April 2017 | June 2022 | |
| Ning Yong | 宁咏 | June 2022 | | |

== See also ==
- Politics of Hubei
