= Hubei Provincial People's Congress =

Hubei Provincial People's Congress 湖北省人民代表大会
- 14th Hubei Provincial People's Congress

Type
- Type: Province-level people's congress

Leadership
- Chairman of the Standing Committee: Wang Zhonglin, CCP since January 2025

Elections
- Hubei Provincial People's Congress voting system: Plurality-at-large voting & Two-round system

Hubei Provincial People's Congress
- Simplified Chinese: 湖北省人民代表大会
- Traditional Chinese: 湖北省人民代表大會
Transcriptions
Standard Mandarin
- Hanyu Pinyin: Húběi Shěng Rénmín Dàibiǎo Dàhuì

The Hubei Provincial People's Congress is the people's congress of Hubei, a province of China. The Congress is elected for a term of five years. The Hubei Provincial People's Congress meetings are held at least once a year. After a proposal by more than one-fifth of the deputies, a meeting of the people's congress at the corresponding level may be convened temporarily.

== History ==
The Hubei Provincial People's Congress held its first session from 9 to 15 August 1954. During the Cultural Revolution from 1966 to 1977, the Hubei Provincial People's Congress ceased to function. The Standing Committee of the Hubei Provincial People's Congress was launched in January 1980.

== Organization ==
=== Chairpersons of the Standing Committee ===
Name	Took office	Left office	Ref.
Chen Pixian	January 1980	April 1983	
Han Ningfu	April 1983	May 1986	
Huang Zhizhen	16 May 1986	April 1993	
Guan Guangfu	May 1993	February 2002	
Yu Zhengsheng	February 2002	January 2003	
Yang Yongliang	January 2003	January 2008	
Luo Qingquan	January 2008	February 2011	
Li Hongzhong	February 2011	January 2017	
Jiang Chaoliang	January 2017	March 2020	
Ying Yong	June 2020	January 2023	
Wang Menghui	January 2023	January 2025	
Wang Zhonglin	January 2025	Incumbent	

== See also ==
- System of people's congress
