= Hubei =

Province in Central China

Hubei 湖北 Hupeh
- Province
- Province of Hubei

Name transcription(s)
  - Chinese: 湖北省 (Húběi Shěng)
  - Abbreviation: HB / 鄂 (È)
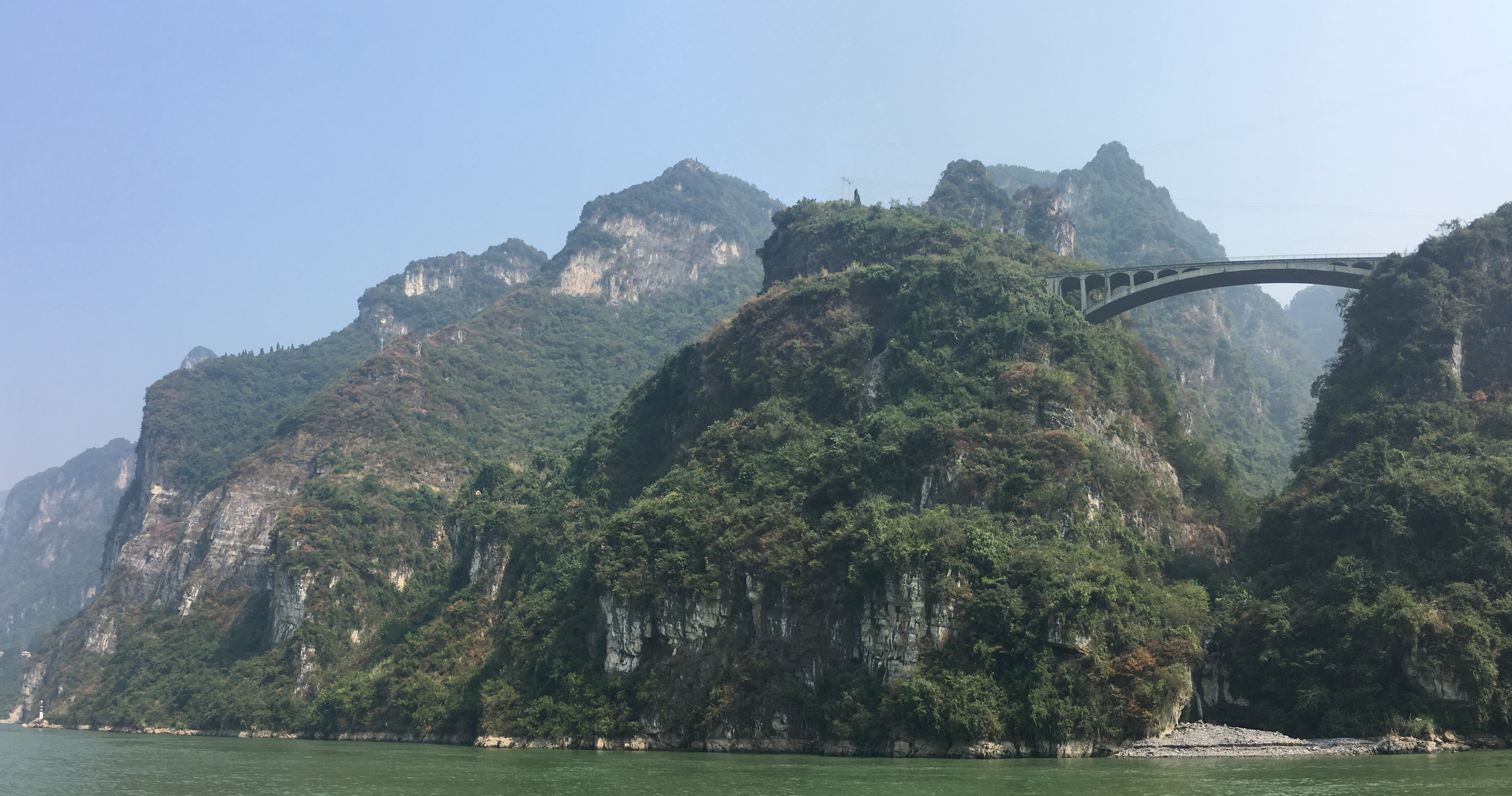
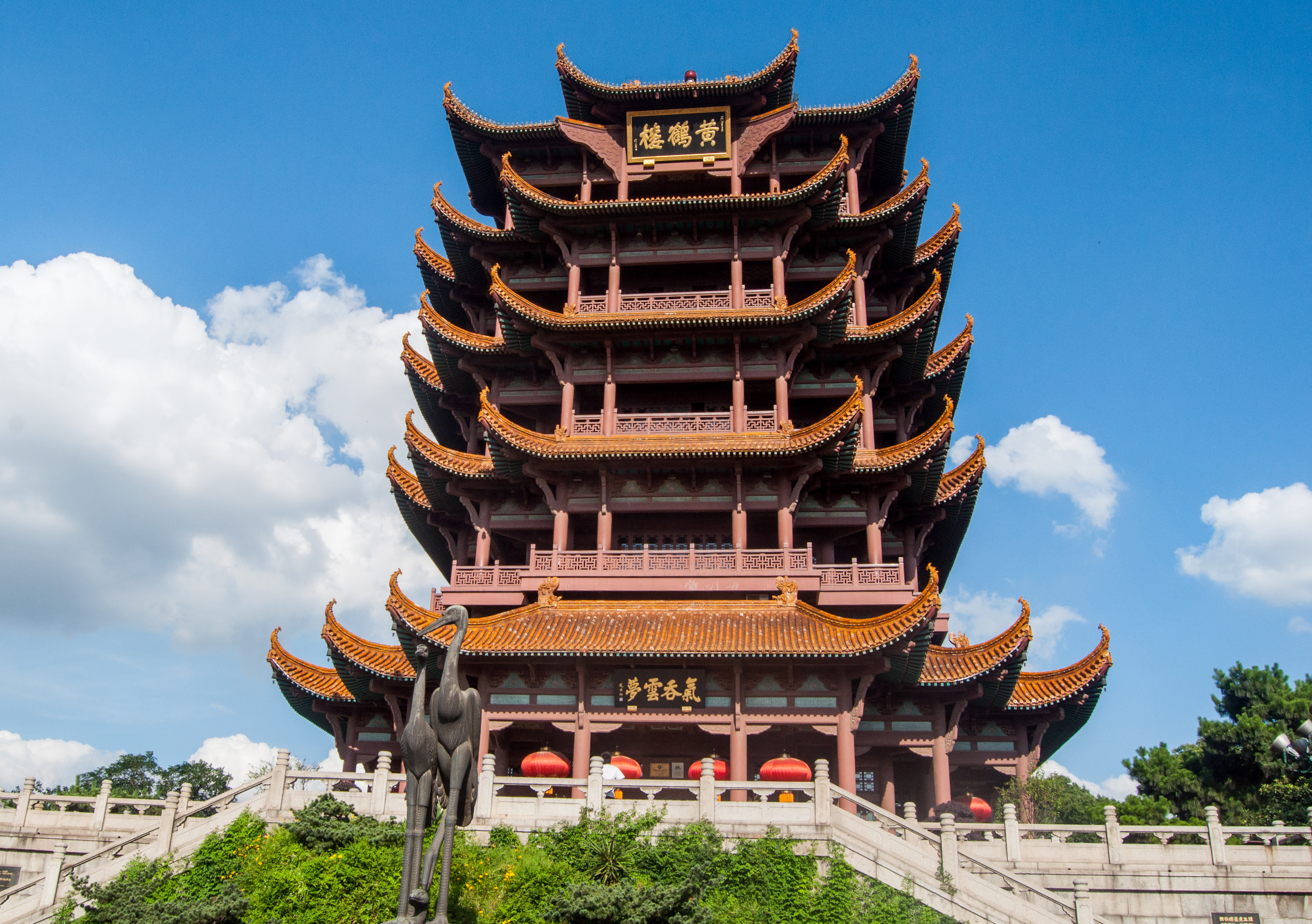
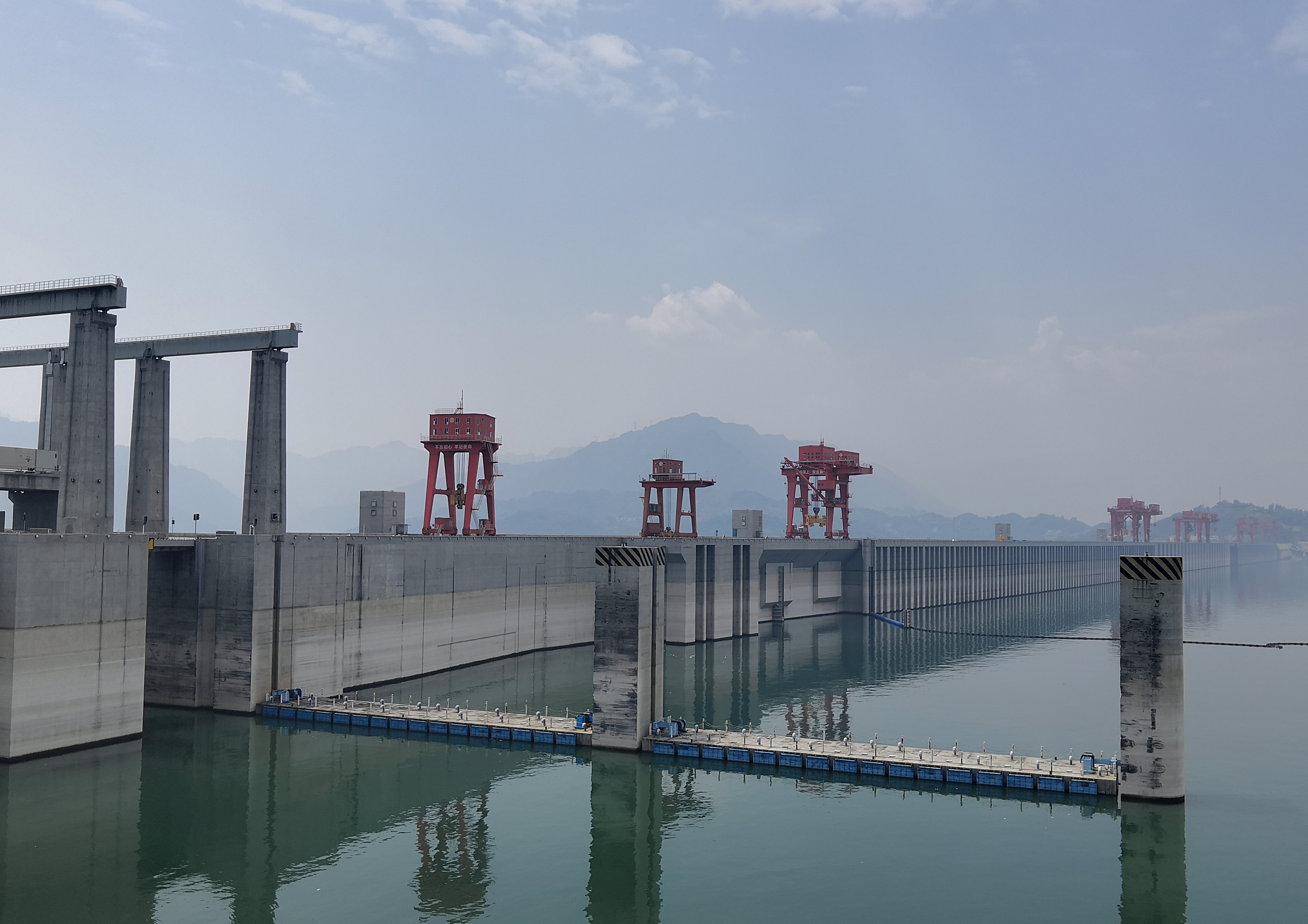
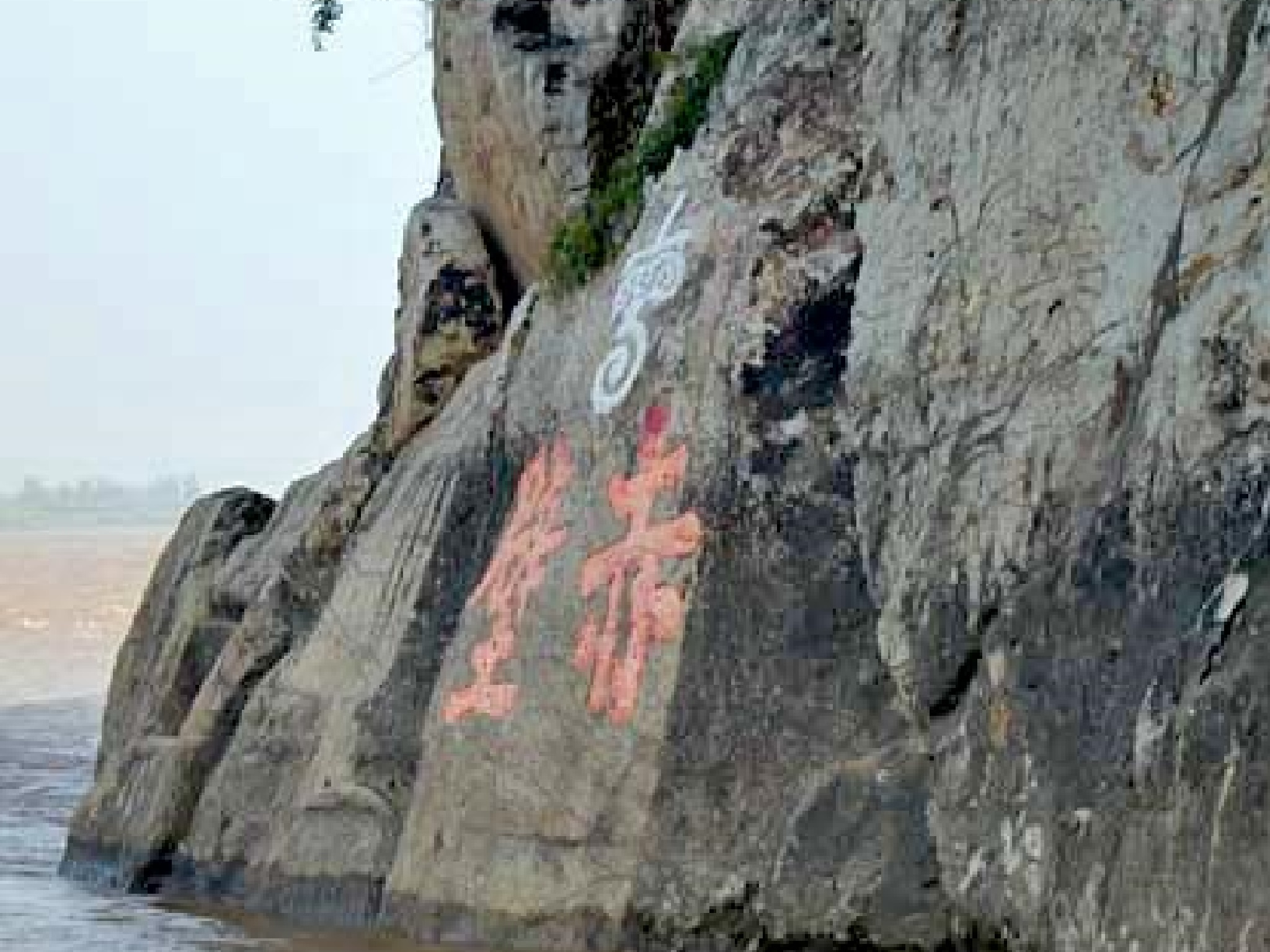
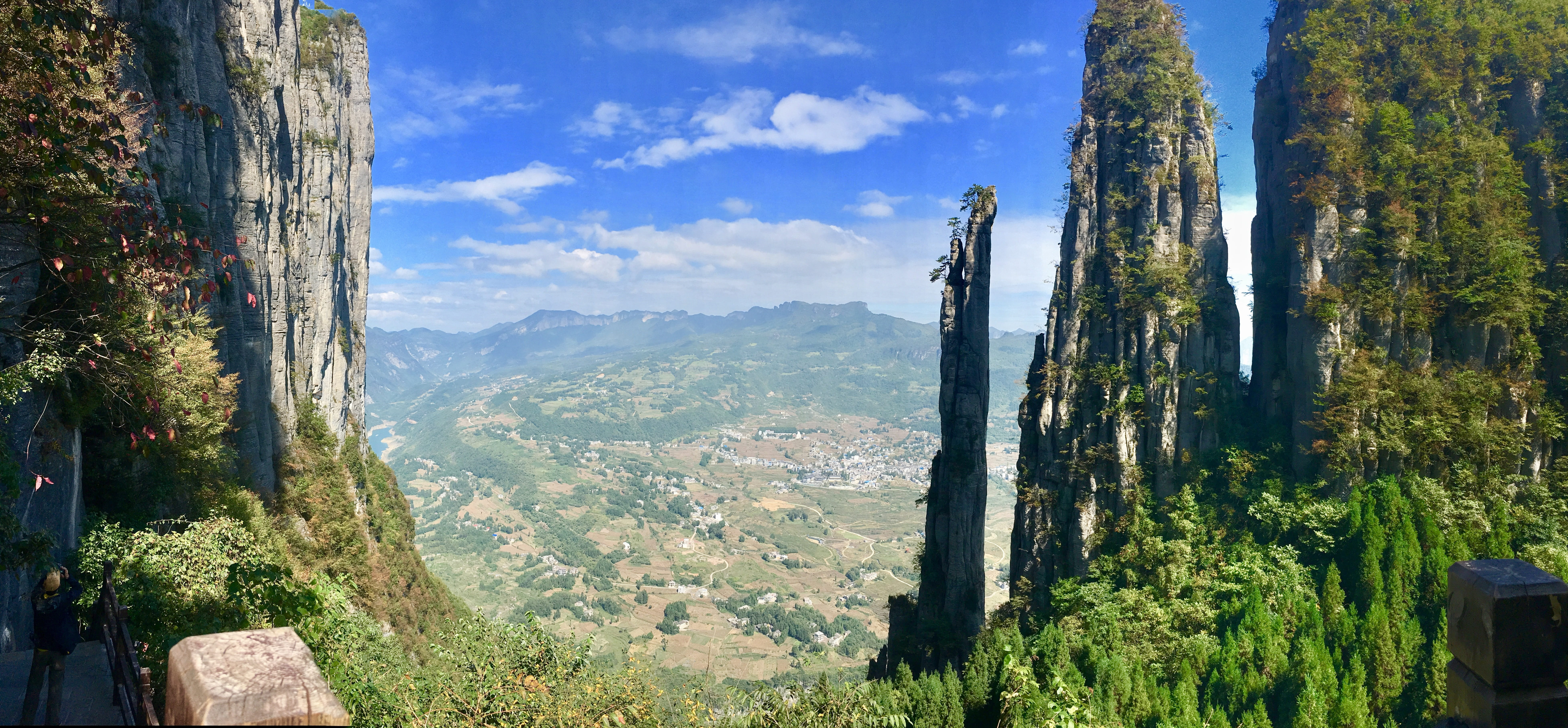
- Xiling Gorge Yellow Crane Tower Three Gorges Dam Red Cliffs Wudang Mountains Enshi Grand Canyon

- Location of Hubei in China
- Country: China
- Capital (and largest city): Wuhan
- Divisions: 13 prefectures, 102 counties, 1235 townships

Government
  - Type: Province
  - Body: Hubei Provincial People's Congress
  - Party Secretary: Guan Zhi'ou
  - Congress director: Wang Zhonglin (titular)
  - Governor: Li Dianxun
  - CPPCC chairman: Sun Wei
  - National People's Congress Representation: 113 deputies

Area
  - Total: 185,900 km^{2} (71,800 sq mi)
  - Rank: 13th
- Highest elevation (Shennong Peak): 3,105 m (10,187 ft)

Population (2021)
  - Total: 58,300,000
  - Rank: 10th
  - Density: 314/km^{2} (812/sq mi)
  - Rank: 12th

Demographics
  - Ethnic composition: Han: 95.6%; Tujia: 3.7%; Miao: 0.4%
  - Languages and dialects: Southwestern Mandarin, Lower Yangtze Mandarin, Gan, Xiang

GDP (2024)
  - Total: CN¥6,001 billion (7th; US$842 billion)
  - Per capita: CN¥102,832 (9th; US$14,439)
- ISO 3166 code: CN-HB
- HDI (2023): 0.803 (10th) – very high
- Website: hubei.gov.cn

Hubei
- Chinese: 湖北
- Postal: Hupeh
- Literal meaning: "North of (Dongting) Lake"
Transcriptions
Standard Mandarin
- Hanyu Pinyin: Húběi
- Bopomofo: ㄏㄨˊ ㄅㄟˇ
- Gwoyeu Romatzyh: Hwubeei
- Wade–Giles: Hu^{2}-pei^{3}
- IPA: [xǔpèɪ]
other Mandarin
- Xiao'erjing: خُ‌بُوِ
Wu
- Romanization: Wu^{入} poh^{平}
Hakka
- Romanization: Fù-pet
Yue: Cantonese
- Yale Romanization: Wùh-bāk
- Jyutping: Wu4-bak1
- IPA: [wu˩.pɐk̚˥]
Southern Min
- Hokkien POJ: Ô͘-pak
- Tâi-lô: Ôo-pak
Eastern Min
- Fuzhou BUC: Hù-báe̤k

Hubei (Note: Chinese: 湖北; /huːˈbeɪ/ hoo-BAY;) is a province in Central China. It has the seventh-largest economy among Chinese provinces, the second-largest within Central China, and the third-largest among inland provinces. Its provincial capital at Wuhan serves as a major political, cultural, and economic hub for the region.

Hubei is associated with the historical state of E that existed during the Western Zhou dynasty (c. 1045 – 771 BC). Its name means 'north of the lake', referring to Dongting Lake. It borders Henan to the north, Anhui and Jiangxi to the east, Hunan to the south, and Chongqing and Shaanxi to the west. The high-profile Three Gorges Dam is located at Yichang in the west of the province.

== History ==
The Hubei region was home to sophisticated Neolithic cultures. By the Spring and Autumn period (770–476 BC), the territory of today's Hubei formed part of the powerful State of Chu. Chu, nominally a tributary state of the Zhou dynasty, was itself an extension of the Chinese civilization that had emerged some centuries before in the north; but Chu also represented a culturally unique blend of northern and southern culture, and it developed into a powerful state that controlled much of the middle and lower Yangtze River, with its power extending northwards into the North China Plain.

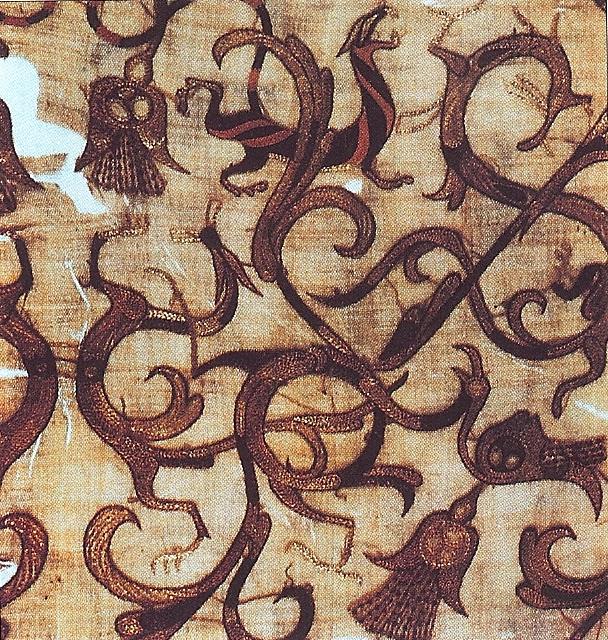
Detail of an embroidered silk gauze ritual garment from a 4th-century BC, Zhou era tomb at Mashan, Jiangling County, Hubei

During the Warring States period (475–221 BC) Chu became the major adversary of the upstart State of Qin to the northwest (in present-day Guanzhong, Shaanxi province), which began to assert itself by outward expansionism. As wars between Qin and Chu ensued, Chu lost more and more land: first its dominance over the Sichuan Basin, then (in 278 BC) its heartland, which corresponds to modern Hubei. In 223 BC Qin chased down the remnants of the Chu regime, which had fled eastwards during Qin's wars of uniting China.

Qin founded the Qin dynasty in 221 BC, the first unified dynasty in China. The Qin dynasty was succeeded in 206 BC by the Han dynasty, which established the province (zhou) of Jingzhou in today's Hubei and Hunan. The Qin and Han played an active role in the extension of farmland in Hubei, maintaining a system of river dikes to protect farms from summer floods. Towards the end of the Eastern Han dynasty in the beginning of the 3rd century, Jingzhou was ruled by regional warlord Liu Biao. After his death in 208, Liu Biao's realm was surrendered by his successors to Cao Cao, a powerful warlord who had conquered nearly all of north China; but in the Battle of Red Cliffs (208 or 209), warlords Liu Bei and Sun Quan drove Cao Cao out of Jingzhou. Liu Bei then took control of Jingzhou and appointed Guan Yu as administrator of Xiangyang (in modern Xiangyang, Hubei) to guard Jing province; he went on to conquer Yizhou (the Sichuan Basin), but lost Jingzhou to Sun Quan; for the next few decades Jingzhou was controlled by the Wu Kingdom, ruled by Sun Quan and his successors.

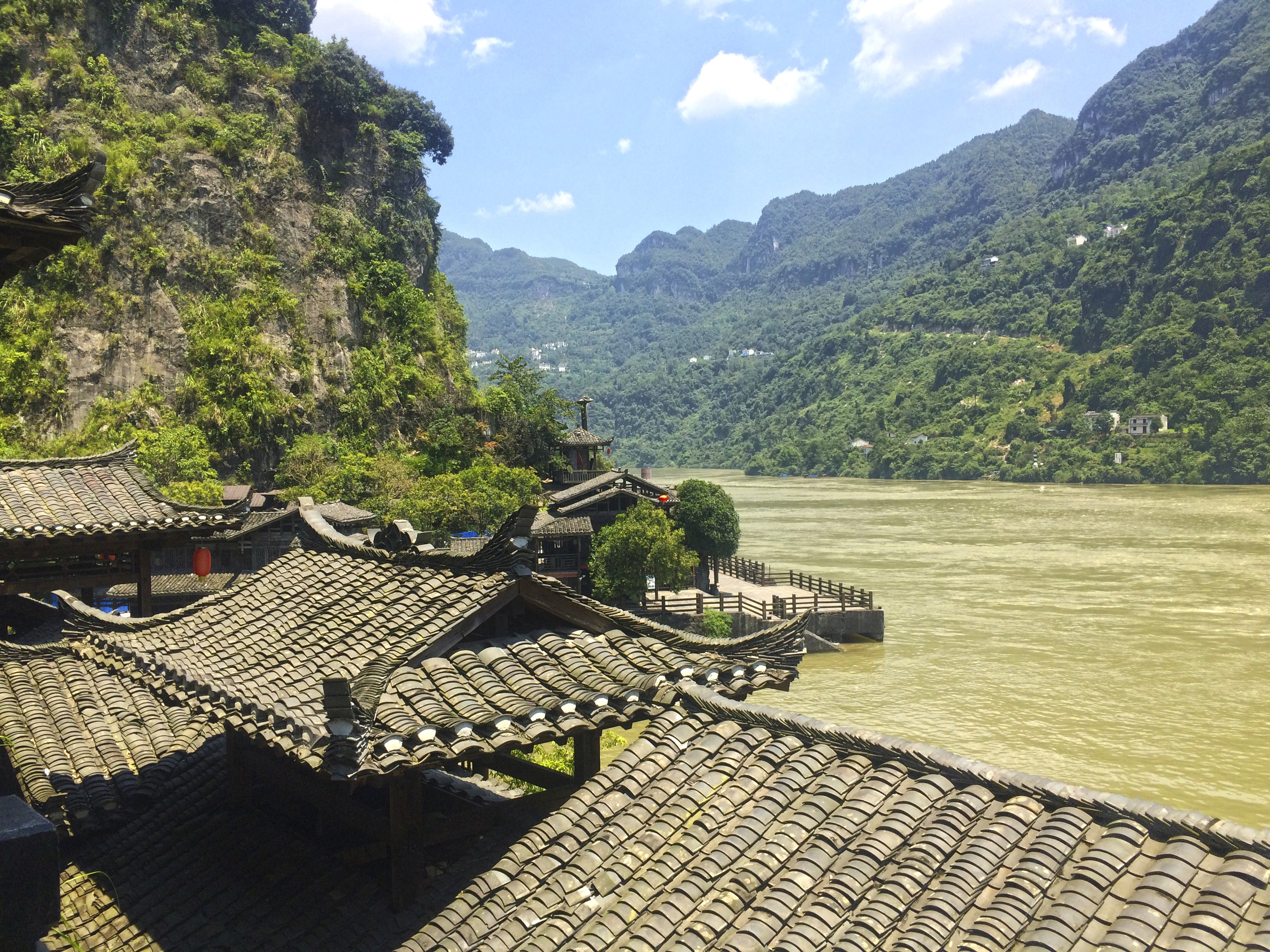
Three Gorges area

The incursion of northern nomadic peoples into the region at the beginning of the 4th century (Five Barbarians' rebellion and Disaster of Yongjia) began nearly three centuries of division into a nomad-ruled (but increasingly Sinicized) north and a Han Chinese-ruled south. Hubei, to the south, remained under southern rule for this entire period, until the unification of China by the Sui dynasty in 589. In 617 the Tang dynasty replaced Sui, and later on the Tang dynasty placed present-day Hubei under the jurisdiction of several circuits: Jiangnanxi Circuit in the south; Shannandong Circuit in the west, and Huainan Circuit in the east. After the Tang dynasty disintegrated in the early 10th century, Hubei came under the control of several regional regimes: Jingnan in the center, Yang Wu and its successor Southern Tang to the east, the Five Dynasties to the north and Shu to Shizhou (施州, in modern Enshi, Enshi Tujia and Miao Autonomous Prefecture).

The Song dynasty reunified the region in 982 and placed most of Hubei into Jinghu North Circuit, a longer version of Hubei's current name. Mongols conquered the region in 1279, and under their rule the province of Huguang was established, covering Hubei, Hunan, and parts of Guangdong and Guangxi.

The Ming dynasty (1368–1644) drove out the Mongols in 1368. Their version of Huguang province was smaller, and corresponded almost entirely to the modern provinces of Hubei and Hunan combined. Hubei lay geographically outside the centers of the Ming power. During the last years of the Ming, today's Hubei was ravaged several times by the rebel armies of Zhang Xianzhong and Li Zicheng. The Manchu Qing dynasty which took control of much of the region in 1644, soon split Huguang into the modern provinces of Hubei and Hunan. The Qing dynasty, however, continued to maintain a Viceroy of Huguang, one of the most well-known viceroys being Zhang Zhidong (in office between 1889 and 1907), whose modernizing reforms made Hubei (especially Wuhan) into a prosperous center of commerce and industry. The Huangshi/Daye area, south-east of Wuhan, became an important center of mining and metallurgy.

In 1911, the Wuchang Uprising took place in modern-day Wuhan. The uprising started the Xinhai Revolution, which overthrew the Qing dynasty and established the Republic of China. In 1927 Wuhan became the seat of a government established by left-wing elements of the Kuomintang, led by Wang Jingwei; this government later merged into Chiang Kai-shek's government in Nanjing. During World War II the eastern parts of Hubei were conquered and occupied by Japan, while the western parts remained under Chinese control.

During the Cultural Revolution in the 1960s, Wuhan saw fighting between rival Red Guard factions. In July 1967, civil strife struck the city in the Wuhan Incident ("July 20th Incident"), an armed conflict between two hostile groups who were fighting for control over the city at the height of the Cultural Revolution.

As the fears of a nuclear war increased during the time of Sino-Soviet border conflicts in the late 1960s, the Xianning prefecture of Hubei was chosen as the site of Project 131, an underground military-command headquarters.

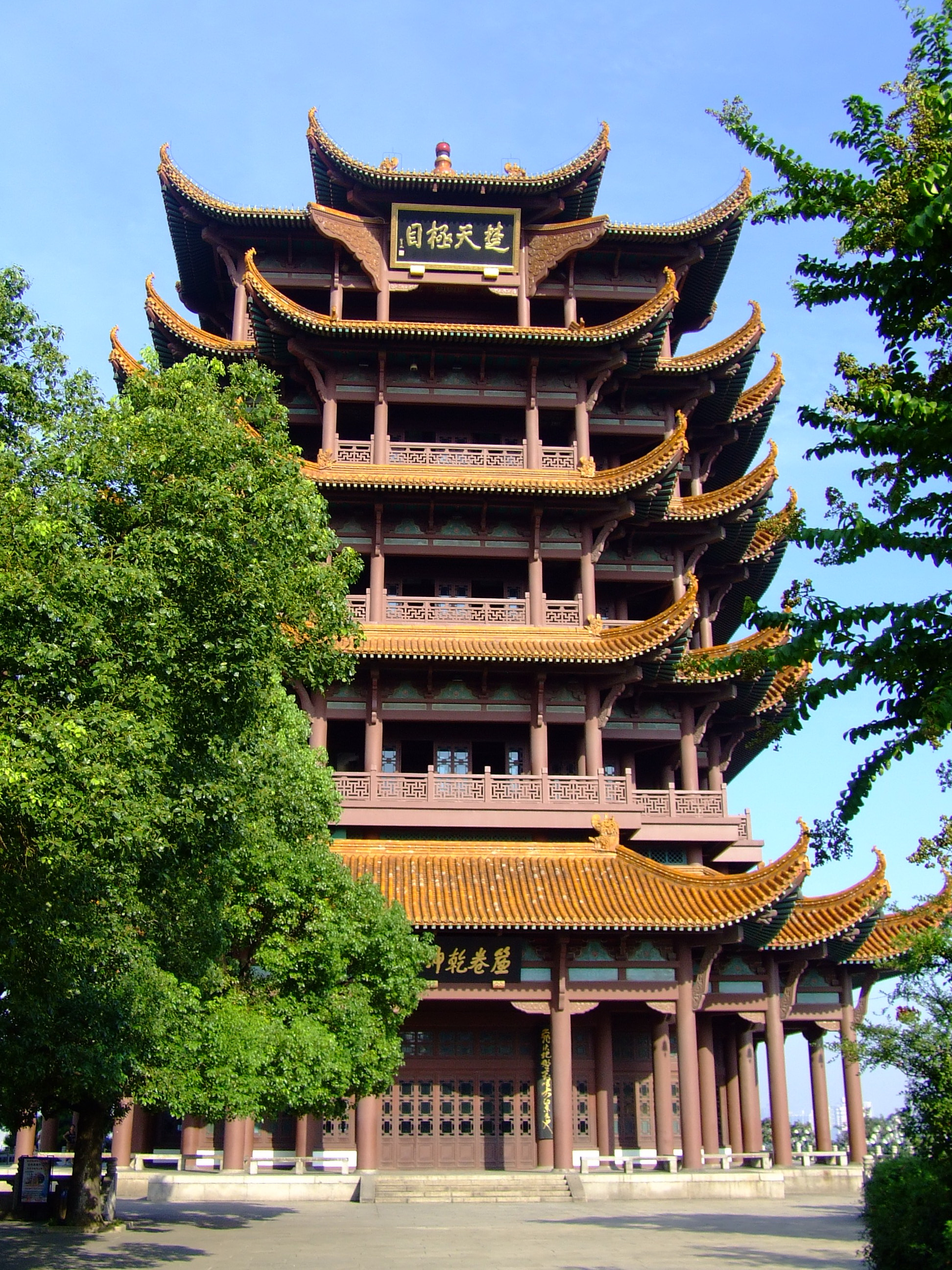
Yellow Crane Tower

The province—and Wuhan in particular—suffered severely from the 1954 Yangtze River Floods. Large-scale dam construction followed, with the Gezhouba Dam on the Yangtze River near Yichang started in 1970 and completed in 1988; the construction of the Three Gorges Dam, further upstream, began in 1993. In the following years, authorities resettled millions of people from western Hubei to make way for the construction of the dam. A number of smaller dams have been constructed on the Yangtze's tributaries as well.

The Xianning Nuclear Power Plant is planned in Dafanzhen, Tongshan County, Xianning, to host at least four 1,250-megawatt (MW) AP1000 pressurized-water reactors. Work on the site began in 2010; plans envisaged that the first reactor would start construction in 2011 and go online in 2015. However, construction of the first phase had yet to start as of 2018.

On 1 December 2019, the first case of COVID-19 in the COVID-19 pandemic was identified in the city of Wuhan. In January 2020, the SARS-CoV-2 virus was officially identified, leading local and federal governments to implement massive quarantine zones across Hubei province, especially in the capital Wuhan (the epicenter of the outbreak). Authorities partially or fully locked down 15 cities, directly affecting 57 million people. Following severe outbreaks in numerous other countries, including in different areas of the world, the World Health Organization declared the COVID-19 a pandemic in March 2020. However, after more than eight weeks, the lockdown on most cities in the province was lifted.

== Geography ==
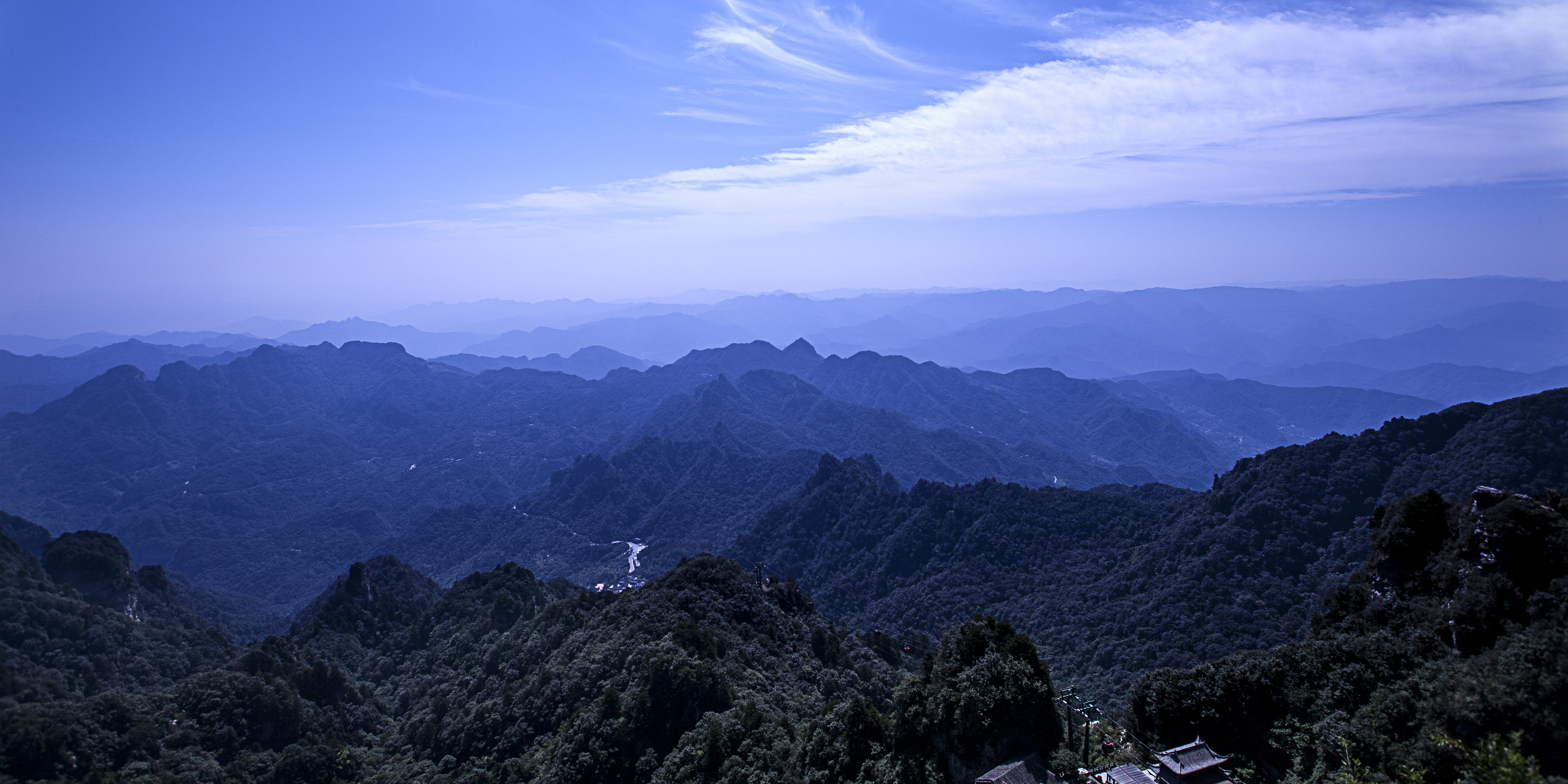
Wudang Mountains in Danjiangkou, Hubei

The Jianghan Plain takes up most of central and southern Hubei, while the west and the peripheries are more mountainous, with ranges such as the Wudang Mountains, the Jing Mountains, the Daba Mountains, and the Wu Mountains (in rough north-to-south order). The Dabie Mountains lie to the northeast of the Jianghan Plain, on the border with Henan and Anhui; the Tongbai Mountains lie to the north on the border with Henan; to the southeast, the Mufu Mountains form the border with Jiangxi. The highest peak in Hubei is Shennong Peak, found in the Daba Mountains of the forestry area of Shennongjia; it has an altitude of 3105 m.

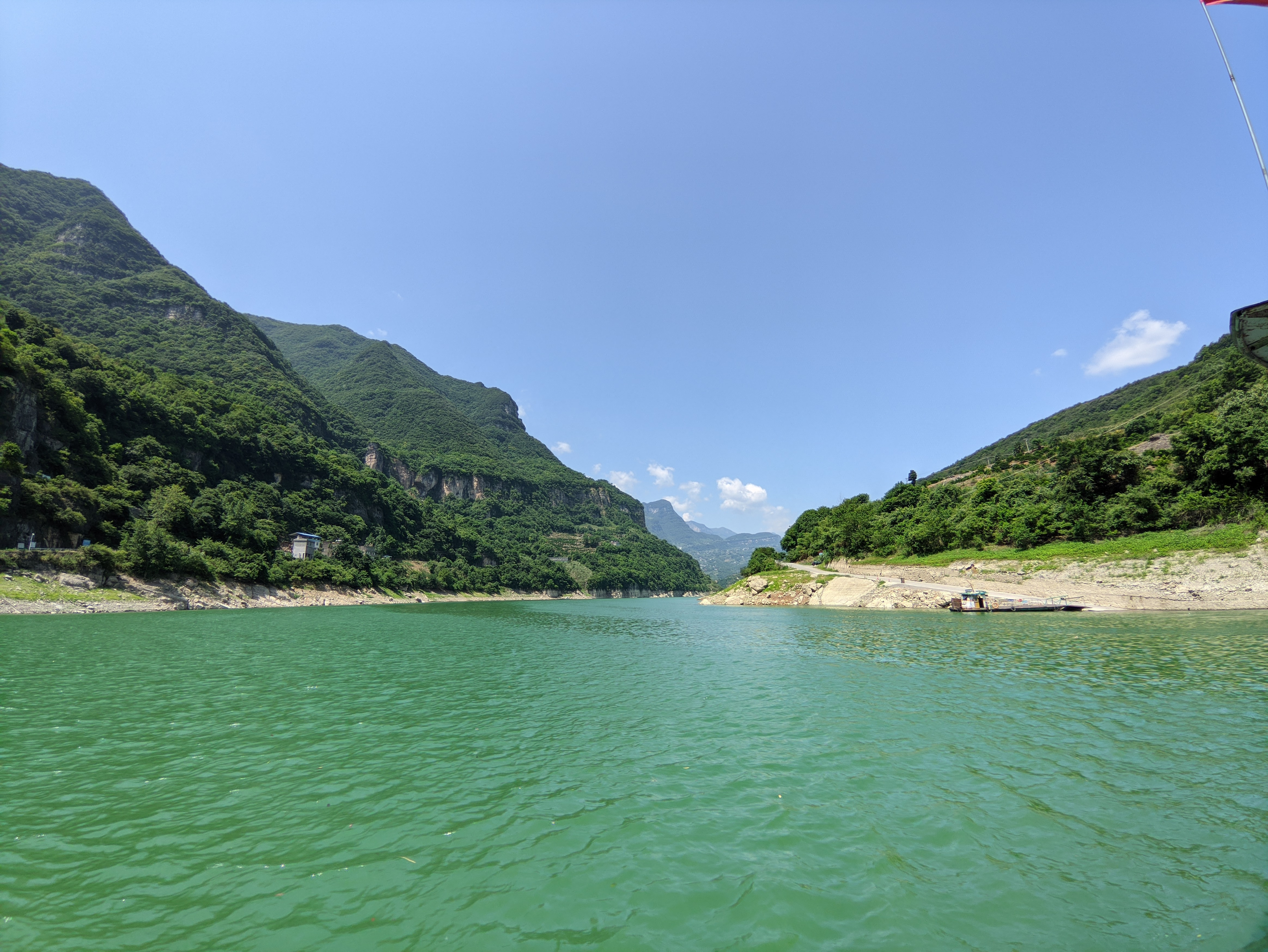
Qing River in Changyang Tujia Autonomous County, southwestern Hubei

The two major rivers of Hubei are the Yangtze River and its left tributary, the Han River; they lend their names to the Jianghan Plain – Jiang representing the Yangtze and han representing the Han River. The Yangtze River enters Hubei from the west via the Three Gorges; the eastern half of the Three Gorges (Xiling Gorge and part of Wu Gorge) lie in western Hubei, while the western half is in neighbouring Chongqing. The Han River enters the province from the northwest. After crossing most of the province, the two great rivers meet at the center of Wuhan, the provincial capital.

Among the notable tributaries of the Yangtze within the province are the Shen Nong Stream (a small northern tributary, severely affected by the Three Gorges Dam project); the Qing, a major waterway of southwestern Hubei; the Huangbo near Yichang; and the Fushui River in the southeast.

Thousands of lakes dot the landscape of Hubei's Jianghan Plain, giving Hubei the name of "Province of Lakes"; the largest of these lakes are Liangzi Lake and Hong Lake. The numerous hydrodams have created a number of large reservoirs, the largest of which is the Danjiangkou Reservoir on the Han River, on the border between Hubei and Henan.

Hubei has a humid subtropical climate (Cfa or Cwa under the Köppen climate classification), with four distinct seasons. Winters are cool to cold, with average temperatures of 1 to 6 °C (34 to 43 °F) in January, while summers are hot and humid, with average temperatures of 24 to 30 °C (75 to 86 °F) in July; punishing temperatures of 40 °C (104 °F) or above are widely associated with Wuhan, the provincial capital. The mountainous districts of western Hubei, in particular Shennongjia, with their cooler summers, attract numerous visitors from Wuhan and other lowland cities.

Besides the capital Wuhan, other important cities are Jingmen; Shiyan, a center of automotive industry and the gateway to the Wudang Mountains; Yichang, the main base for the gigantic hydroelectric projects of southwestern Hubei; and Shashi.

== Administrative divisions ==
Hubei is divided into thirteen prefecture-level divisions (of which there are twelve prefecture-level cities (including a sub-provincial city) and one autonomous prefecture), as well as three directly administered county-level cities (all sub-prefecture-level cities) and one directly administered county-level forestry area. At the end of 2017, the total population was 59.02 million.

Administrative divisions of Hubei
Division code	Division	Area in km^{2}	Population 2020	Seat	Divisions			
Division code	Division	Area in km^{2}	Population 2020	Seat	Districts	Counties	Aut. counties	CL cities*
420000	Hubei Province	185,900.00	57,752,557	Wuhan city	39	35	2	27
420100	Wuhan city	8,549.09	12,326,518	Jiang'an District	13			
420200	Huangshi city	4,582.85	2,469,079	Xialu District	4	1		1
420300	Shiyan city	23,674.41	3,209,004	Maojian District	3	4		1
420500	Yichang city	21,227.00	4,017,607	Xiling District	5	3	2	3
420600	Xiangyang city	19,724.41	5,260,951	Xiangcheng District	3	3		3
420700	Ezhou city	1,593.54	1,079,353	Echeng District	3			
420800	Jingmen city	12,192.57	2,596,927	Dongbao District	2	1		2
420900	Xiaogan city	8,922.72	4,270,371	Xiaonan District	1	3		3
421000	Jingzhou city	14,068.68	5,231,180	Shashi District	2	2		4
421100	Huanggang city	17,446.63	5,882,719	Huangzhou District	1	7		2
421200	Xianning city	9,749.84	2,658,316	Xian'an District	1	4		1
421300	Suizhou city	9,614.94	2,047,923	Zengdu District	1	1		1
422800	Enshi Autonomous Prefecture	24,061.25	3,456,136	Enshi city		6		2
429004	Xiantao city**	2,538.00	1,134,715	Shazui Subdistrict				1
429005	Qianjiang city**	2,004.00	886,547	Yuanlin Subdistrict				1
429006	Tianmen city**	2,622.00	1,158,640	Jingling Subdistrict				1
429021	Shennongjia Forestry District **	3,253.00	66,571	Songbai town				1
Sub-provincial cities * – including Forestry district ** – Directly administered county-level divisions

Administrative divisions in Chinese and varieties of romanizations
English	Chinese	Pinyin
Hubei Province	湖北省	Húběi Shěng
Wuhan city	武汉市	Wǔhàn Shì
Huangshi city	黄石市	Huángshí Shì
Shiyan city	十堰市	Shíyàn Shì
Yichang city	宜昌市	Yíchāng Shì
Xiangyang city	襄阳市	Xiāngyáng Shì
Ezhou city	鄂州市	Èzhōu Shì
Jingmen city	荆门市	Jīngmén Shì
Xiaogan city	孝感市	Xiàogǎn Shì
Jingzhou city	荆州市	Jīngzhōu Shì
Huanggang city	黄冈市	Huánggāng Shì
Xianning city	咸宁市	Xiánníng Shì
Suizhou city	随州市	Suízhōu Shì
Enshi Autonomous Prefecture	恩施自治州	Ēnshī Zhōu
Xiantao city	仙桃市	Xiāntáo Shì
Qianjiang city	潜江市	Qiánjiāng Shì
Tianmen city	天门市	Tiānmén Shì
Shennongjia Forestry District	神农架林区	Shénnóngjià Línqū

The thirteen Prefecture and four directly administered county-level divisions of Hubei are subdivided into 103 county-level divisions (39 districts, 24 county-level cities, 37 counties, 2 autonomous counties, 1 forestry district; the directly administered county-level divisions are included here). Those are in turn divided into 1234 township-level divisions (737 towns, 215 townships, nine ethnic townships, and 273 subdistricts).

Population by urban areas of prefecture and county cities
#	City	Urban area	District area	City proper	Census date
1	Wuhan	7,541,527	9,785,388	9,785,388	2010-11-01
2	Xiangyang (Note: Formerly known as Xiangfan PLC until 2 December 2010.)	1,433,057	2,199,690	5,500,307	2010-11-01
3	Yichang	1,049,363	1,411,380	4,059,686	2010-11-01
4	Jingzhou	904,157	1,154,086	5,691,707	2010-11-01
5	Shiyan (Note: New district established after census: Yunyang (Yunxian County). The new district not included in the urban area and district area count of the pre-expanded city.)	724,016	767,920	3,340,841	2010-11-01
(5)	Shiyan (new district)	173,085	558,355	see Shiyan	2010-11-01
6	Huangshi	691,963	691,963	2,429,318	2010-11-01
7	Tianmen	612,515	1,418,913	1,418,913	2010-11-01
8	Ezhou	607,739	1,048,668	1,048,668	2010-11-01
9	Xiaogan	582,403	908,266	4,814,542	2010-11-01
10	Xiantao	553,029	1,175,085	1,175,085	2010-11-01
11	Hanchuan	468,868	1,015,507	see Xiaogan	2010-11-01
12	Daye	449,998	909,724	see Huangshi	2010-11-01
13	Zaoyang	442,367	1,004,741	see Xiangyang	2010-11-01
14	Zhongxiang	439,019	1,022,514	see Jingmen	2010-11-01
15	Qianjiang	437,757	946,277	946,277	2010-11-01
16	Jingmen	426,119	632,954	2,873,687	2010-11-01
17	Suizhou	393,173	618,582	2,162,222	2010-11-01
18	Xianning	340,723	512,517	2,462,583	2010-11-01
19	Enshi	320,107	749,574	part of Enshi Prefecture	2010-11-01
20	Macheng	302,671	849,090	see Huanggang	2010-11-01
21	Yingcheng	302,026	593,812	see Xiaogan	2010-11-01
22	Honghu	278,685	819,446	see Jingzhou	2010-11-01
23	Guangshui	272,402	755,910	see Suizhou	2010-11-01
24	Songzi	271,514	765,911	see Jingzhou	2010-11-01
25	Wuxue	270,882	644,247	see Huanggang	2010-11-01
26	Huanggang	267,860	366,769	6,162,069	2010-11-01
(27)	Jingshan (Note: Jingshan County is currently known as Jingshan CLC after census.)	266,341	636,776	see Jingmen	2010-11-01
28	Anlu	237,409	568,590	see Xiaogan	2010-11-01
29	Zhijiang	218,396	495,995	see Yichang	2010-11-01
30	Shishou	213,851	577,022	see Jingzhou	2010-11-01
31	Laohekou	212,645	471,482	see Xiangyang	2010-11-01
32	Chibi	202,542	478,410	see Xianning	2010-11-01
33	Yicheng	201,945	512,530	see Xiangyang	2010-11-01
34	Lichuan	195,749	654,094	part of Enshi Prefecture	2010-11-01
35	Danjiangkou	190,021	443,755	see Shiyan	2010-11-01
36	Dangyang	183,823	468,293	see Yichang	2010-11-01
37	Yidu	176,233	384,598	see Yichang	2010-11-01

Most populous cities in Hubei Source: China Urban Construction Statistical Yearbook 2018 Urban Population and Urban Temporary Population
Rank		Pop.	Rank		Pop.
1	Wuhan	9,180,000	11	Qianjiang	437,400
2	Xiangyang	1,325,700	12	Xianning	413,200
3	Yichang	931,300	13	Xiantao	405,000
4	Jingzhou	870,500	14	Hanchuan	345,900
5	Huangshi	859,900	15	Huanggang	338,000
6	Shiyan	734,400	16	Zaoyang	320,000
7	Xiaogan	573,800	17	Guangshui	319,300
8	Jingmen	571,700	18	Daye	303,900
9	Suizhou	502,500	19	Tianmen	299,200
10	Ezhou	459,700	20	Wuxue	293,000

== Politics ==
Like all governing institutions in mainland China, Hubei has a parallel party-government system, in which the CCP Hubei Provincial Committee Secretary outranks the Governor. The CCP Hubei Provincial Committee acts as the top policy-formulation body, and has control over the Hubei Provincial People's Government.

== Economy ==
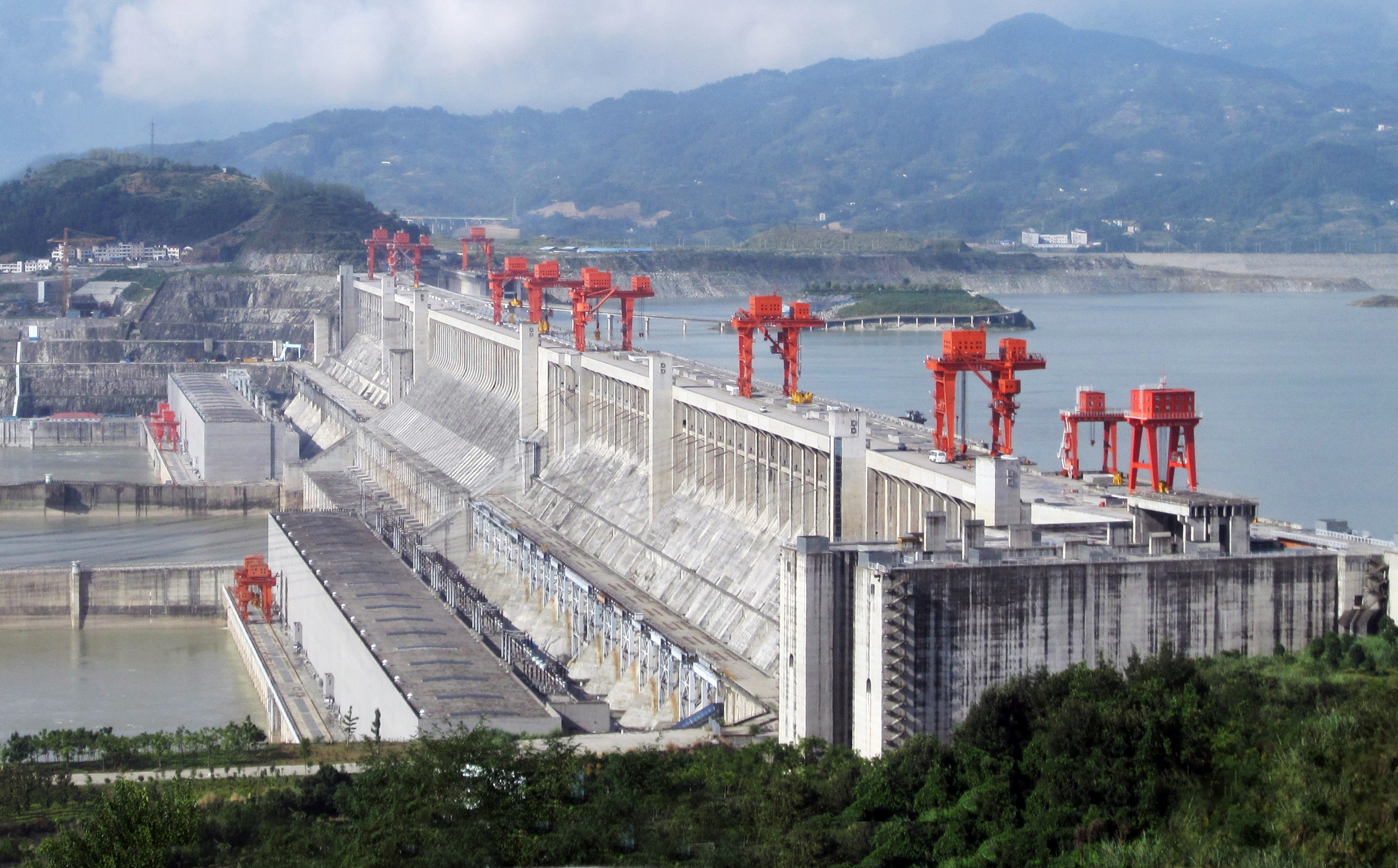
The Three Gorges Dam on the Yangtze River

Hubei is often called the "Land of Fish and Rice" (鱼米之乡). Important agricultural products in Hubei include cotton, rice, wheat, and tea, while industries include automobiles, metallurgy, machinery, power generation, textiles, foodstuffs and high-tech commodities.

Mineral resources that can be found in Hubei in significant quantities include borax, hongshiite, wollastonite, garnet, marlstone, iron, phosphorus, copper, gypsum, rutile, rock salt, gold amalgam, manganese and vanadium. The province's recoverable reserves of coal stand at 548 million tons, which is modest compared to other Chinese provinces. Hubei is well known for its mines of fine turquoise and green faustite.

Hubei was a major recipient of China's investment in industrial capacity during the Third Front campaign.

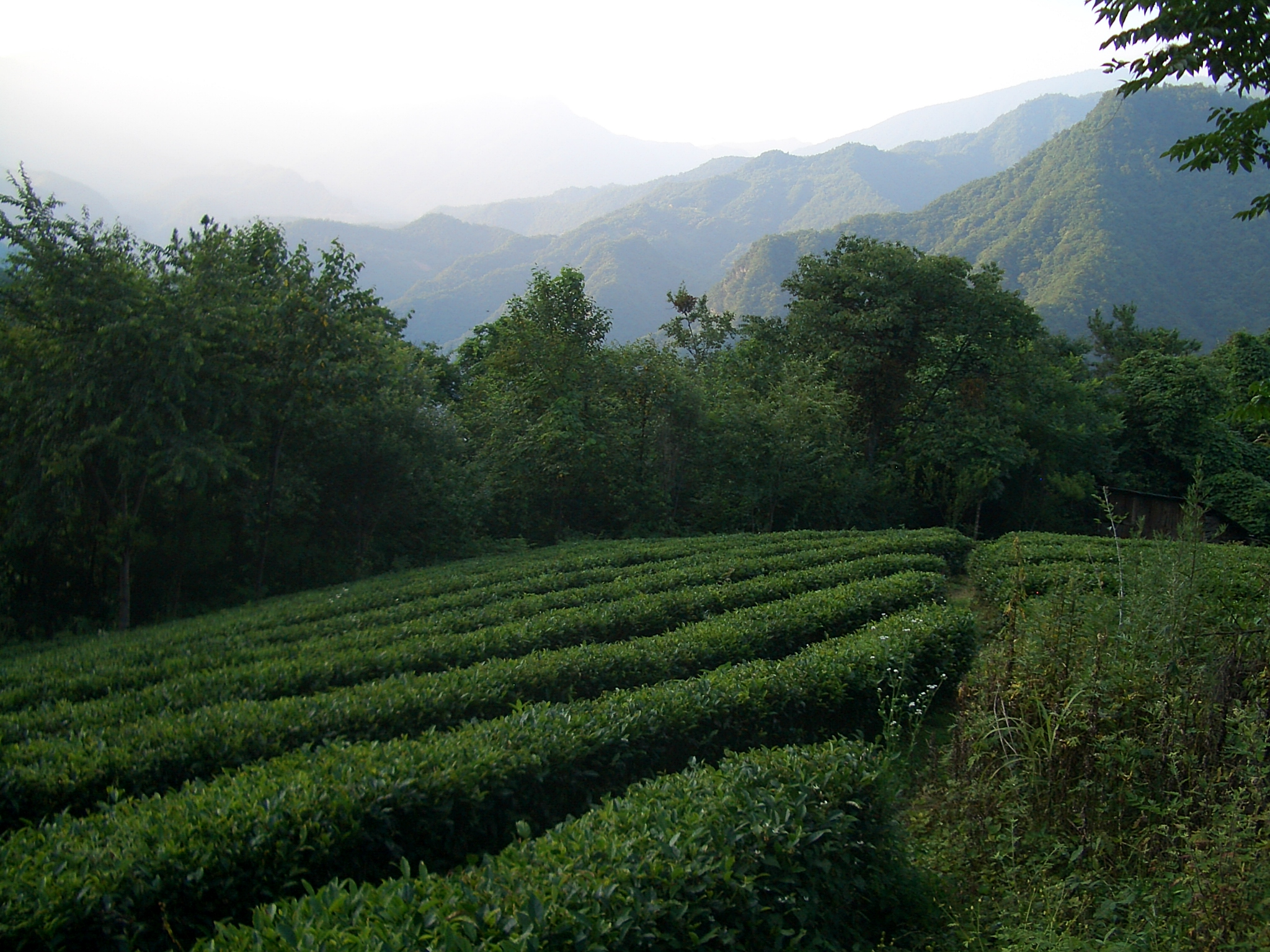
Tea plantations on the western slopes of the Muyu Valley

Since completion in 2012, the Three Gorges Dam in western Hubei provides plentiful hydroelectricity, with an average annual power production of 95 Twh. Existing hydroelectric stations include Gezhouba, Danjiangkou, Geheyan, Hanjiang, Duhe, Huanglongtan, Bailianhe, Lushui and Fushui.

Hubei is the 7th-largest provincial economy of China, the second largest in the Central China region after Henan, the third largest in the South Central China region after Guangdong and Henan and the third largest among inland provinces after Henan and Sichuan. As of 2021, Hubei's nominal GDP was US$787 billion (CNY 5 trillion). Its GDP (nominal) per capita exceeded US$13,000, making it the richest landlocked province, the richest province in the Central China region, and 2nd richest province in South Central China region after Guangdong.

=== Economic and Technological Development Zones ===
- Hubei Jingzhou Chengnan Economic Development Zone was established in 1992 under the approval of Hubei Government. Three major industries include textile, petroleum and chemical processing, with a combined output accounts for 90% of its total output. The zone also enjoys a well-developed transportation network—only 6 kilometres (3.7 mi) to the airport and 4 kilometres (2.5 mi) to the railway station.
- Wuhan East Lake High-Tech Development Zone is a national level high-tech development zone. Optical-electronics, telecommunications, and equipment manufacturing are the core industries of Wuhan East Lake High-Tech Development Zone (ELHTZ) while software outsourcing and electronics are also encouraged. ELHTZ is China's largest production centre for optical-electronic products with key players like Changfei Fiber-optical Cables (the largest fiber-optical cable maker in China), Fenghuo Telecommunications and Wuhan Research Institute of Post and Telecommunications (the largest research institute in optical telecommunications in China). Wuhan ELHTZ represents the development centre for China's laser industry with key players such as HUST Technologies and Chutian Laser being based in the zone.
- Wuhan Economic and Technological Development Zone is a national level industrial zone incorporated in 1993. Its size is about 10–25 square km and it plans to expand to 25–50 square km. Industries encouraged in Wuhan Economic and Technological Development Zone include automobile production/assembly, biotechnology/pharmaceuticals, chemicals production and processing, food/beverage processing, heavy industry, and telecommunications equipment.
- Wuhan Export Processing Zone was established in 2000. It is located in Wuhan Economic & Technology Development Zone, planned to cover land of 2.7 km^{2} (1.0 sq mi). The first 0.7 km^{2} (0.27 sq mi) area has been launched.
- Wuhan Optical Valley (Guanggu) Software Park is in Wuhan East Lake High-Tech Development Zone. Wuhan Optics Valley Software Park is jointly developed by East Lake High-Tech Development Zone and Dalian Software Park Co., Ltd. The planned area is 0.67 km^{2} (0.26 sq mi) with total floor area of 600,000 square meters. The zone is 8.5 km (5.28 mi) from the 316 National Highway and is 46.7 km (29.02 mi) from the Wuhan Tianhe Airport.
- Xiangyang New & Hi-Tech Industrial Development Zone

== Demographics ==
Historical population
Year	Pop.	±%
1912	29,590,000	—
1928	26,699,000	−9.8%
1936–37	25,516,000	−4.4%
1947	20,976,000	−17.8%
1952	21,470,000	+2.4%
1954	27,789,693	+29.4%
1964	33,709,344	+21.3%
1982	47,804,150	+41.8%
1990	53,969,210	+12.9%
2000	59,508,870	+10.3%
2010	57,237,740	−3.8%
2020	57,752,557	+0.9%
Wuhan (Hankou) part of Hubei Province until 1927; dissolved in 1949 and incorporated into Hubei Province.

Han Chinese form the dominant ethnic group in Hubei. A considerable Miao and Tujia population live in the southwestern part of the province, especially in Enshi Tujia and Miao Autonomous Prefecture.

On October 18, 2009, Chinese officials began to relocate 330,000 residents from the Hubei and Henan provinces that will be affected by the Danjiangkou Reservoir on the Han river. The reservoir is part of the larger South-North Water Transfer Project.

=== Religion ===
Religion in Hubei (Note: The data was collected by the Chinese General Social Survey (CGSS) of 2009 and by the Chinese Spiritual Life Survey (CSLS) of 2007, reported and assembled by Xiuhua Wang (2015) in order to confront the proportion of people identifying with two similar social structures: ① Christian churches, and ② the traditional Chinese religion of the lineage (i.e. people believing and worshipping ancestral deities often organised into lineage "churches" and ancestral shrines). Data for other religions with a significant presence in China (deity cults, Buddhism, Taoism, folk religious sects, Islam, et al.) was not reported by Wang.)
1. Chinese ancestral religion (6.50%)
2. Christianity (0.58%)
3. Other religions or not religious people (Note: This may include: Buddhists; Confucians; Deity worshippers; Taoists; Members of folk religious sects; Small minorities of Muslims; People not bounded to nor practicing any institutional or diffuse religion.) (92.9%)

The predominant religions in Hubei are Chinese folk religions, Taoist traditions and Chinese Buddhism. According to surveys conducted in 2007 and 2009, 6.5% of the population believes and is involved in cults of ancestors, while 0.58% of the population identifies as Christian, declining from 0.83% in 2004. The reports did not give figures for other types of religion; 92.92% of the population may be either irreligious or involved in worship of nature deities, Buddhism, Confucianism, Taoism, folk religious sects.

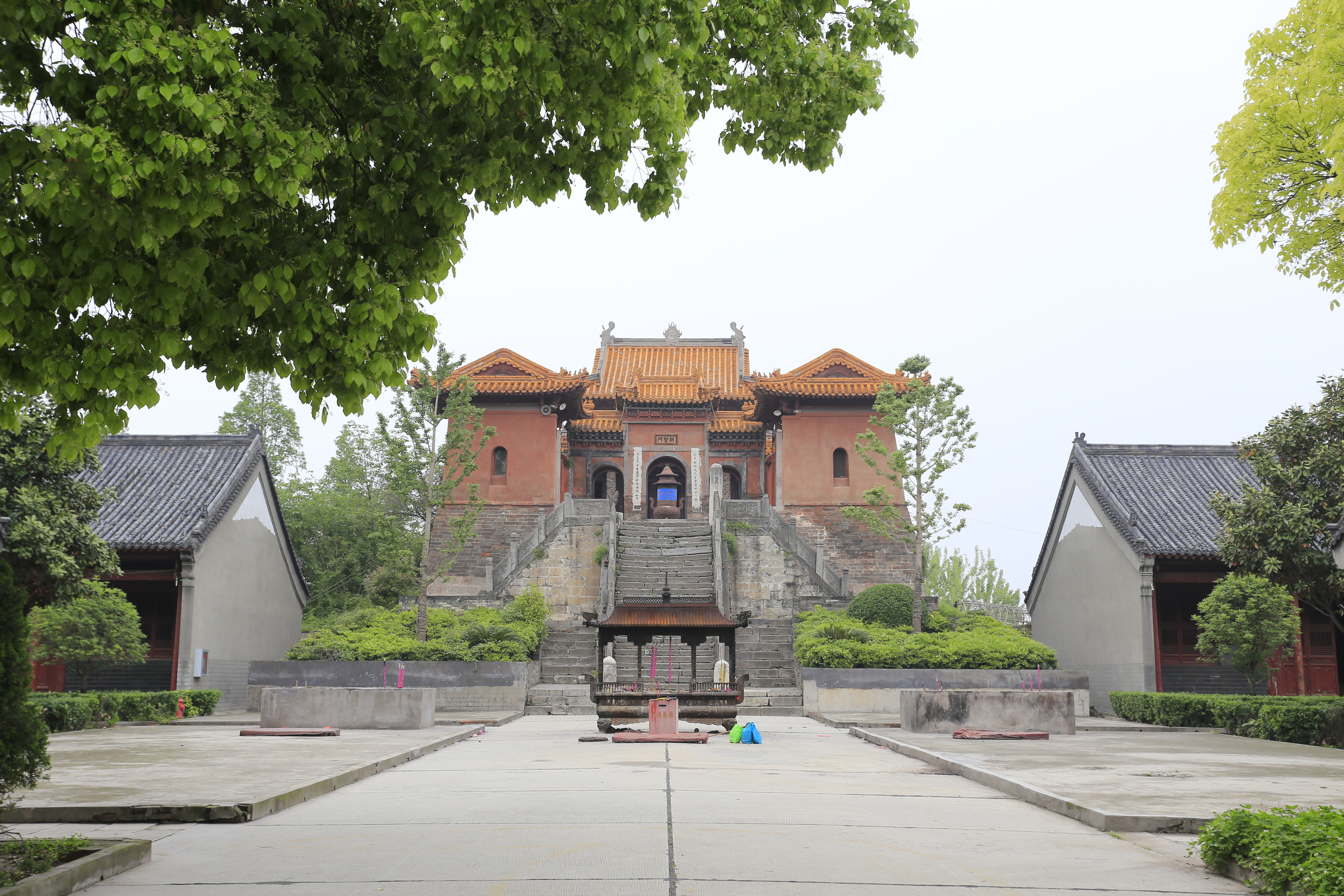
Taihui Taoist Temple in Jingzhou

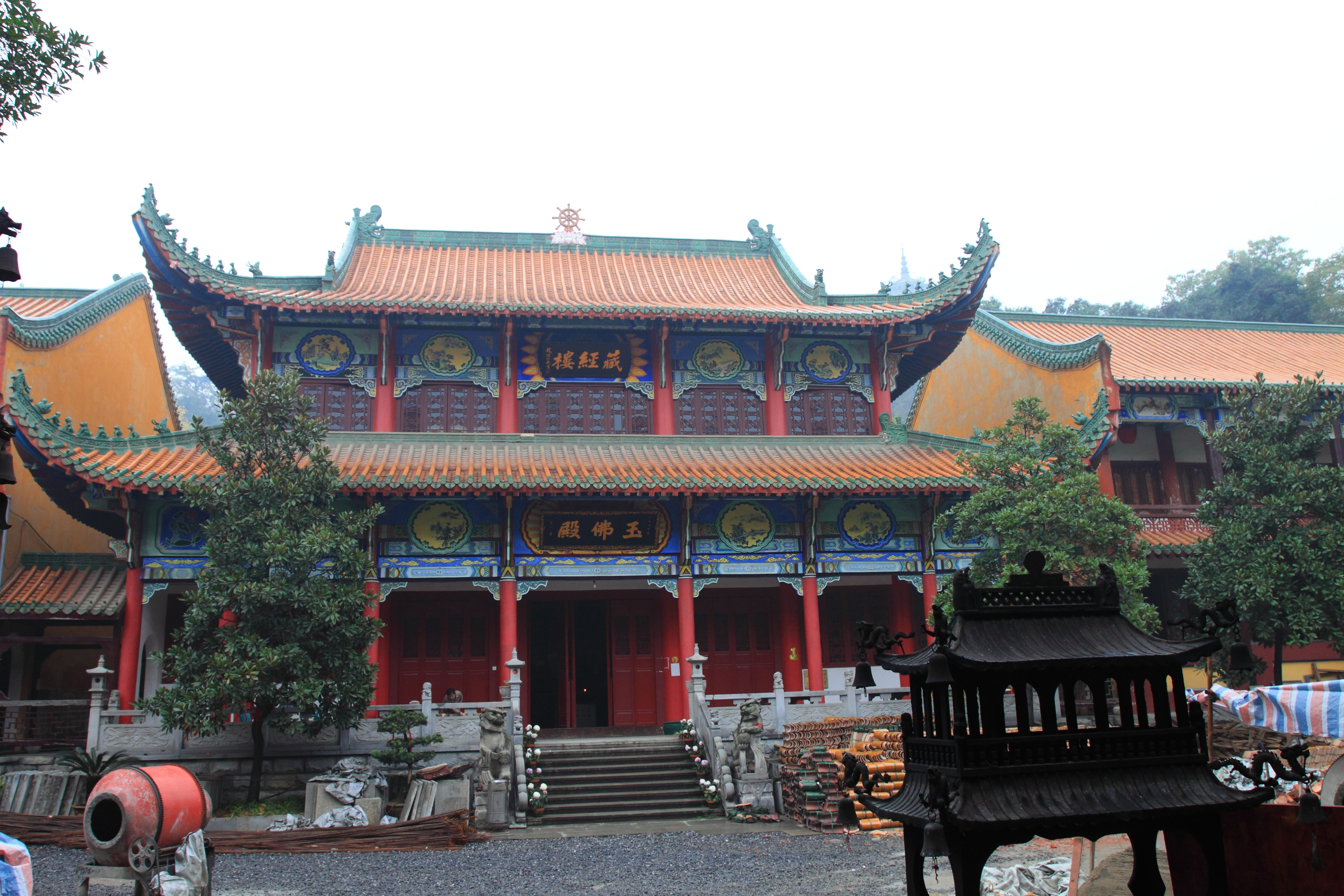
Baotong Buddhist Temple in Wuhan

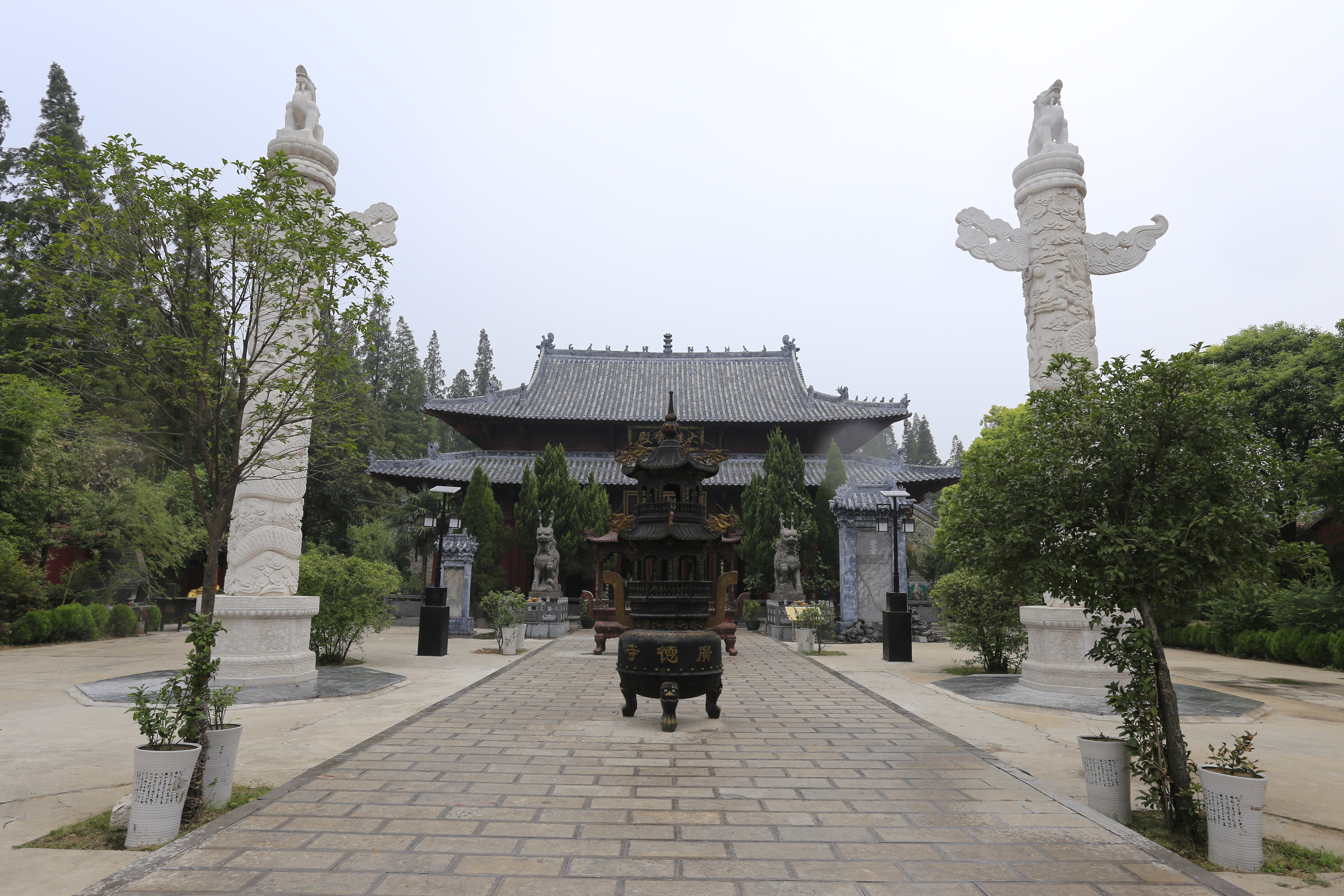
Guangde Buddhist Temple in Xiangyang

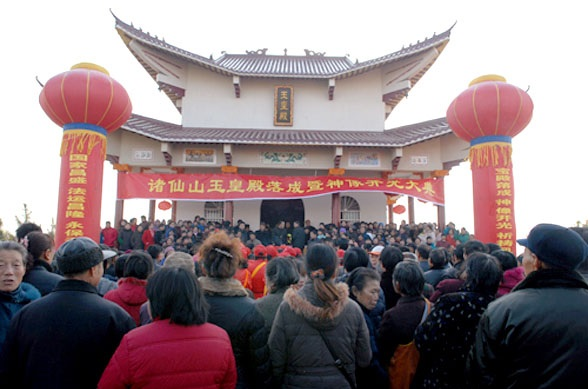
Ancestral shrine in Hong'an, Huanggang

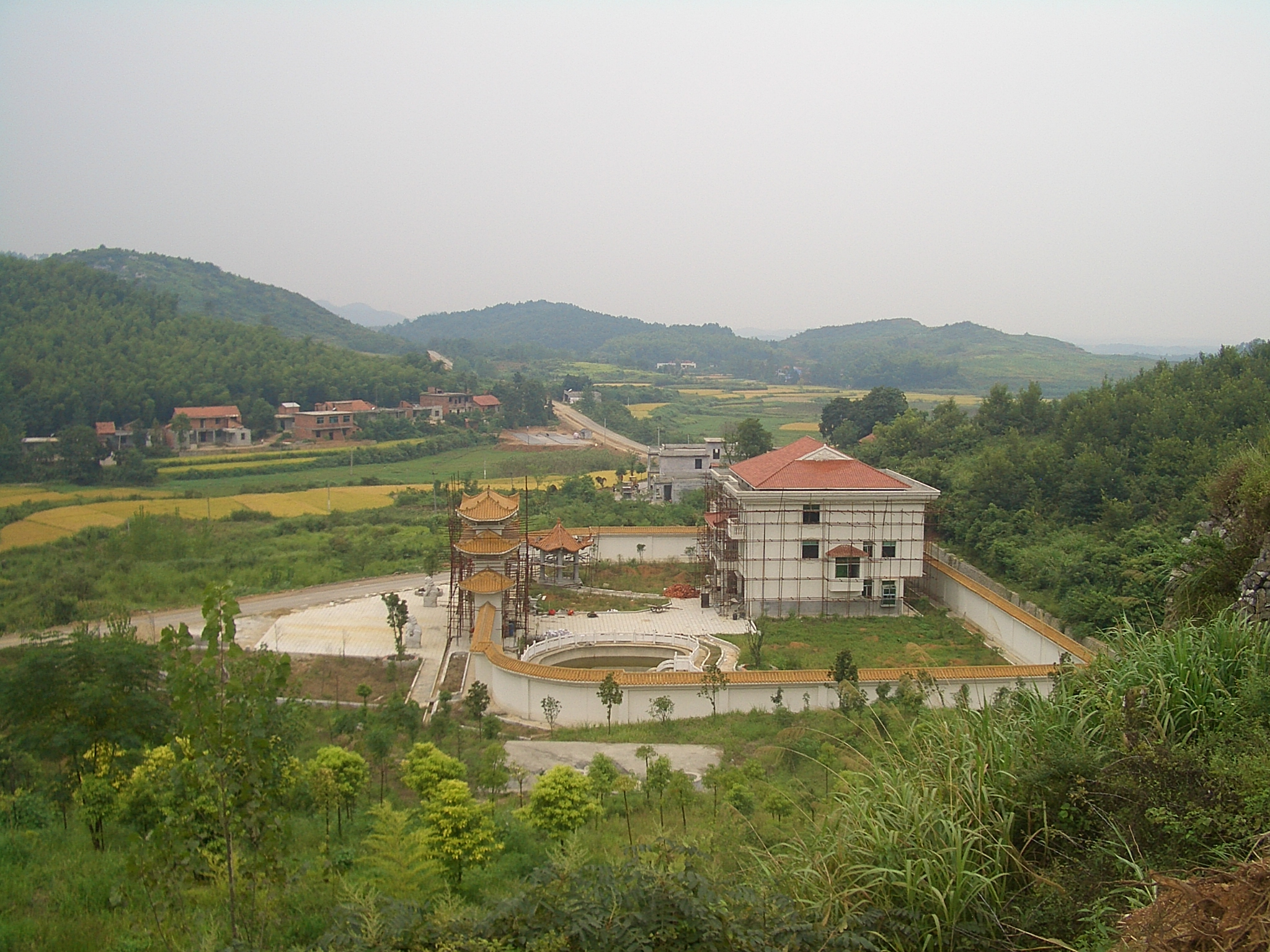
Rural Buddhist community temple in Xianning

== Culture ==
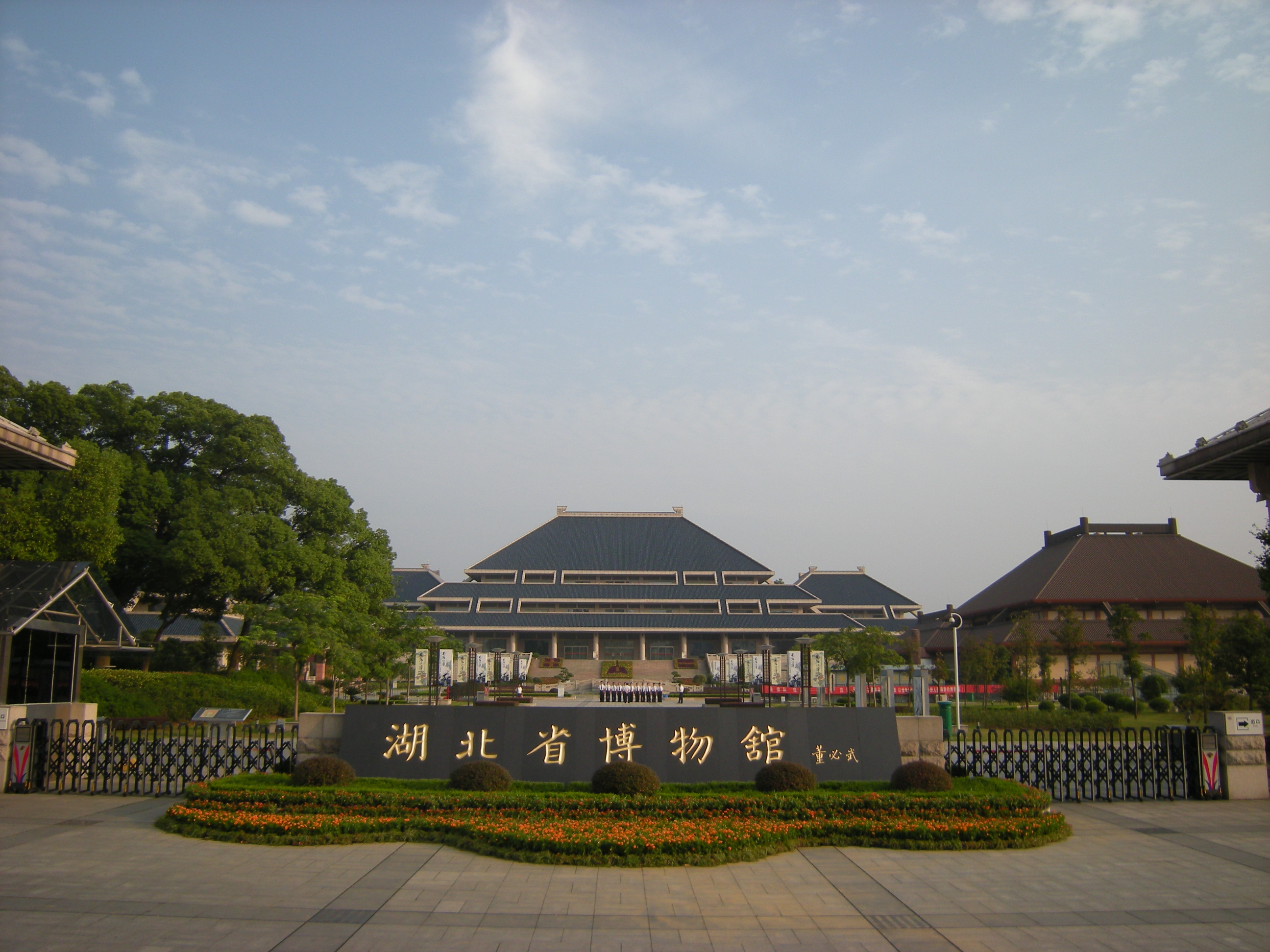
Hubei Provincial Museum

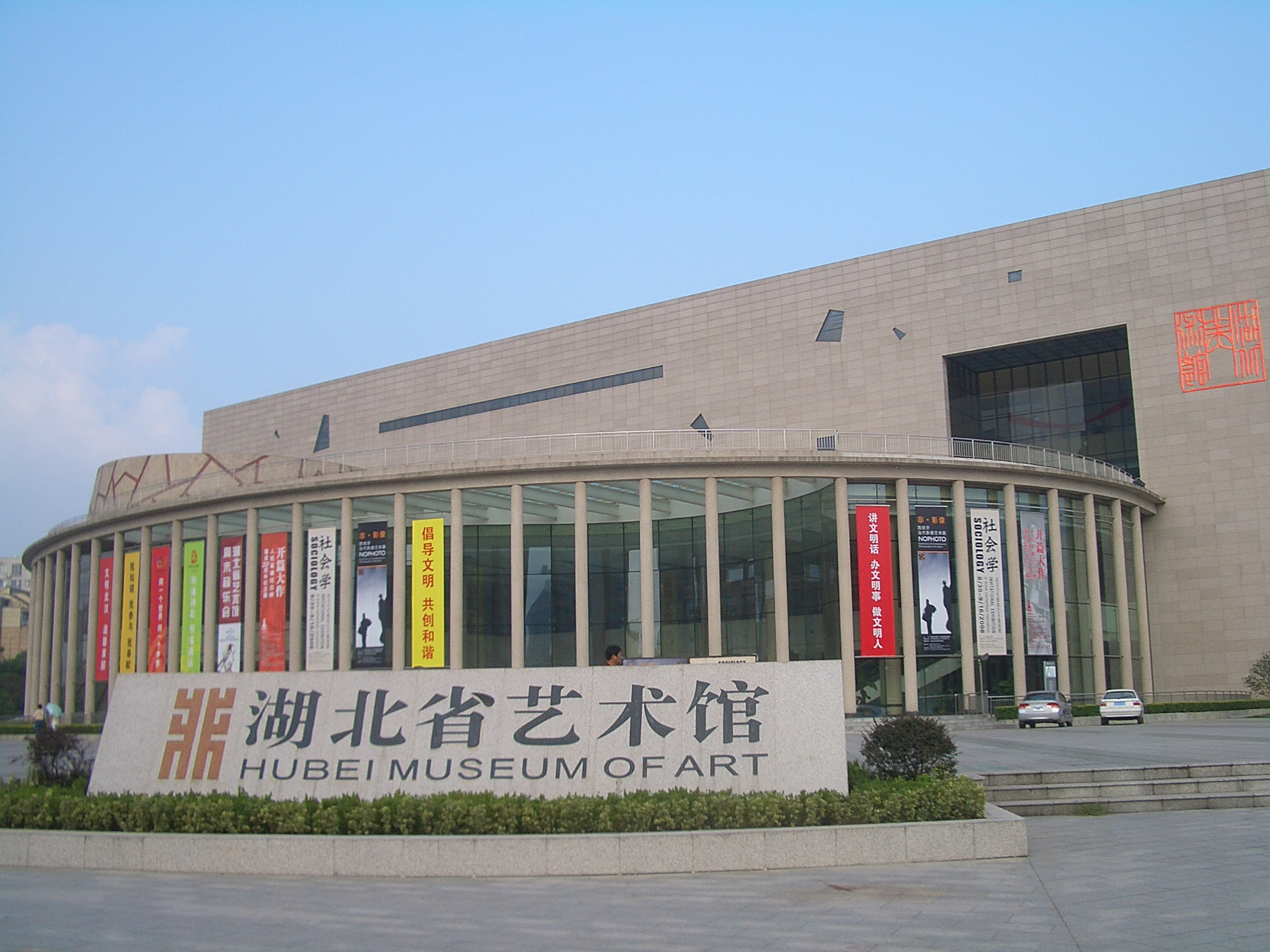
Hubei Museum of Art

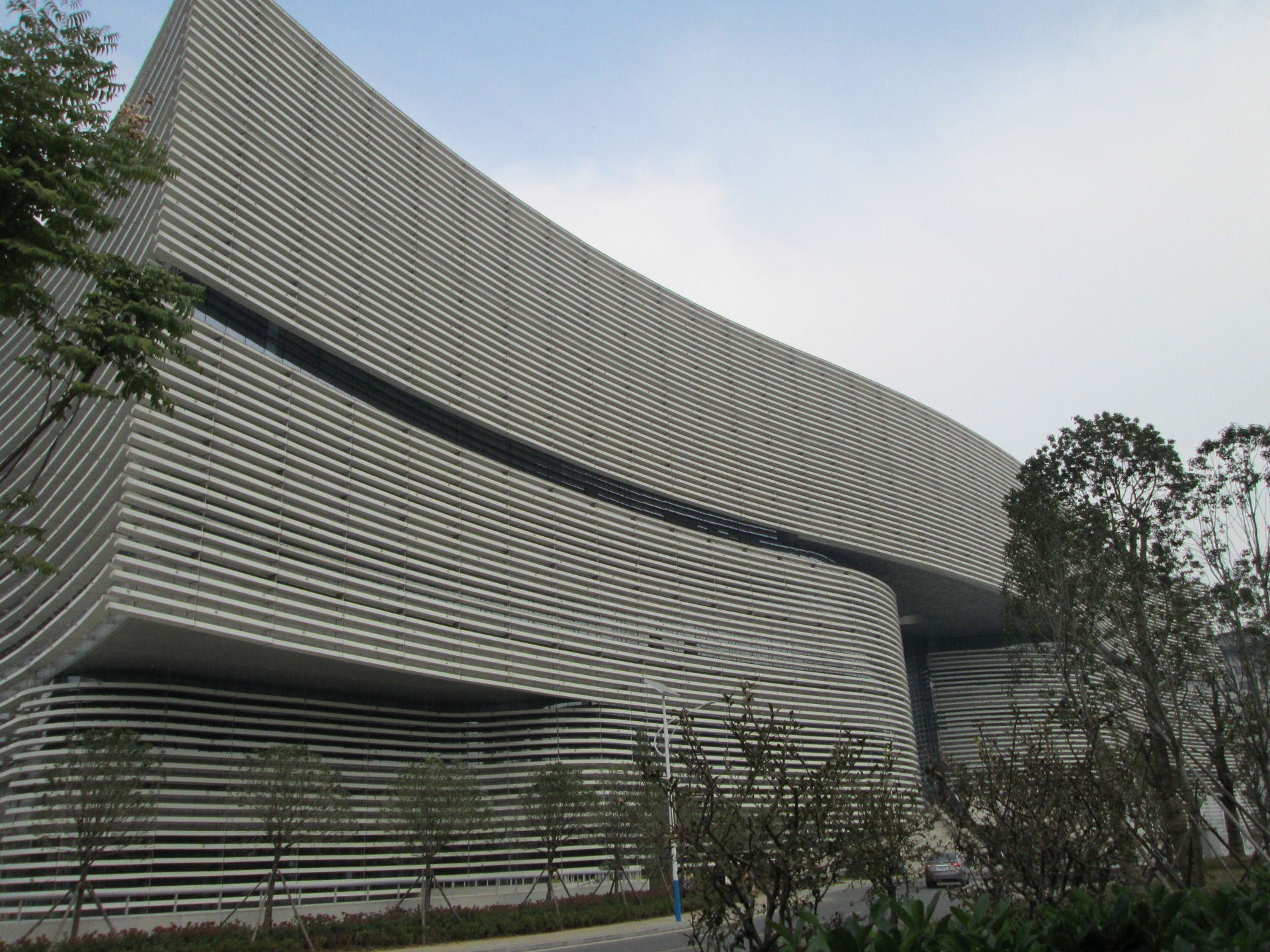
Hubei Provincial Library

People in Hubei speak Mandarin dialects; most of these dialects are classified as Southwestern Mandarin dialects, a group that also encompasses the Mandarin dialects of most of southwestern China.

Perhaps the most celebrated element of Hubei cuisine is the Wuchang bream, a freshwater bream that is commonly steamed.

Types of traditional Chinese opera popular in Hubei include Hanju and Chuju (楚剧; Chǔ Jù).

The Shennongjia area is the alleged home of the Yeren, a wild undiscovered hominid that lives in the forested hills.

Wuhan is one of the major culture centers in China.

Hubei is thought to be the province that originated the card game of dou dizhu.

== Education ==
As of 2022, Hubei hosts 130 institutions of higher education, ranking sixth together with Hunan (130) among all Chinese provinces after Jiangsu (168), Guangdong (160), Henan (156), Shandong (153), and Sichuan (134). The Huazhong University of Science and Technology(HUST), Wuhan University and many other institutions in Wuhan make it a hub of higher education and research in China. Wuhan is the city that has the largest college student population in the world (1.3 million) studying in its 89 universities.

=== Universities ===
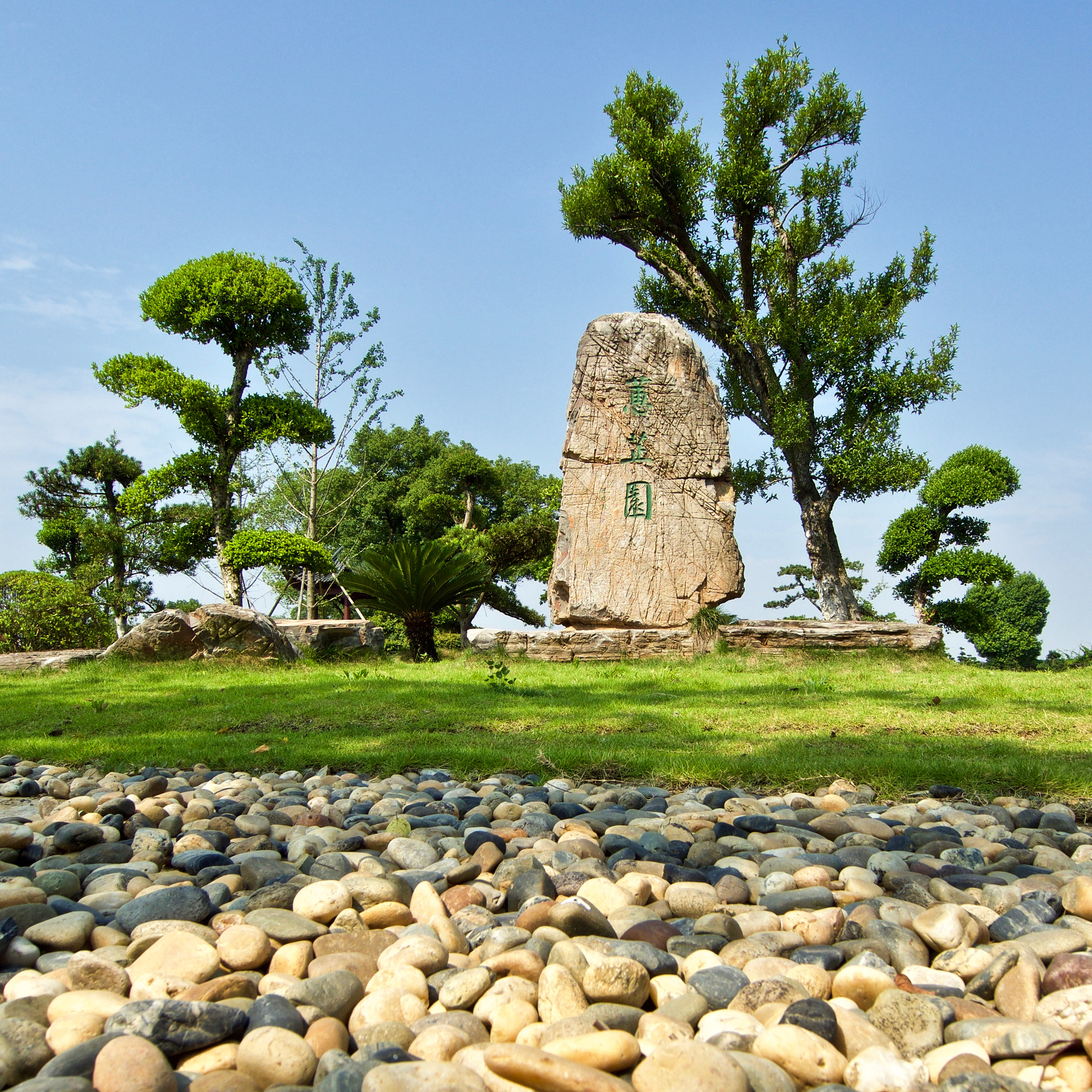
Garden At Huazhong Agricultural University

- Huazhong University of Science and Technology
- Wuhan University
- Central China Normal University (Huazhong Normal University)
- Wuhan University of Technology
- Huazhong Agricultural University
- Hubei University of Technology
- Zhongnan University of Economics and Law
- China University of Geosciences
- Jianghan University
- Hubei University
- Hubei University of Economics
- Hubei University of Education
- China Three Gorges University (yichang)
- Wuhan Institute of Technology
- Wuhan University of Science and Technology
- Yangtze University
- South-Central University for Nationalities
- Hubei Institute of Fine Arts
- Wuhan Technology and Business University
- Wuhan Technical College of Communications

== Transportation ==
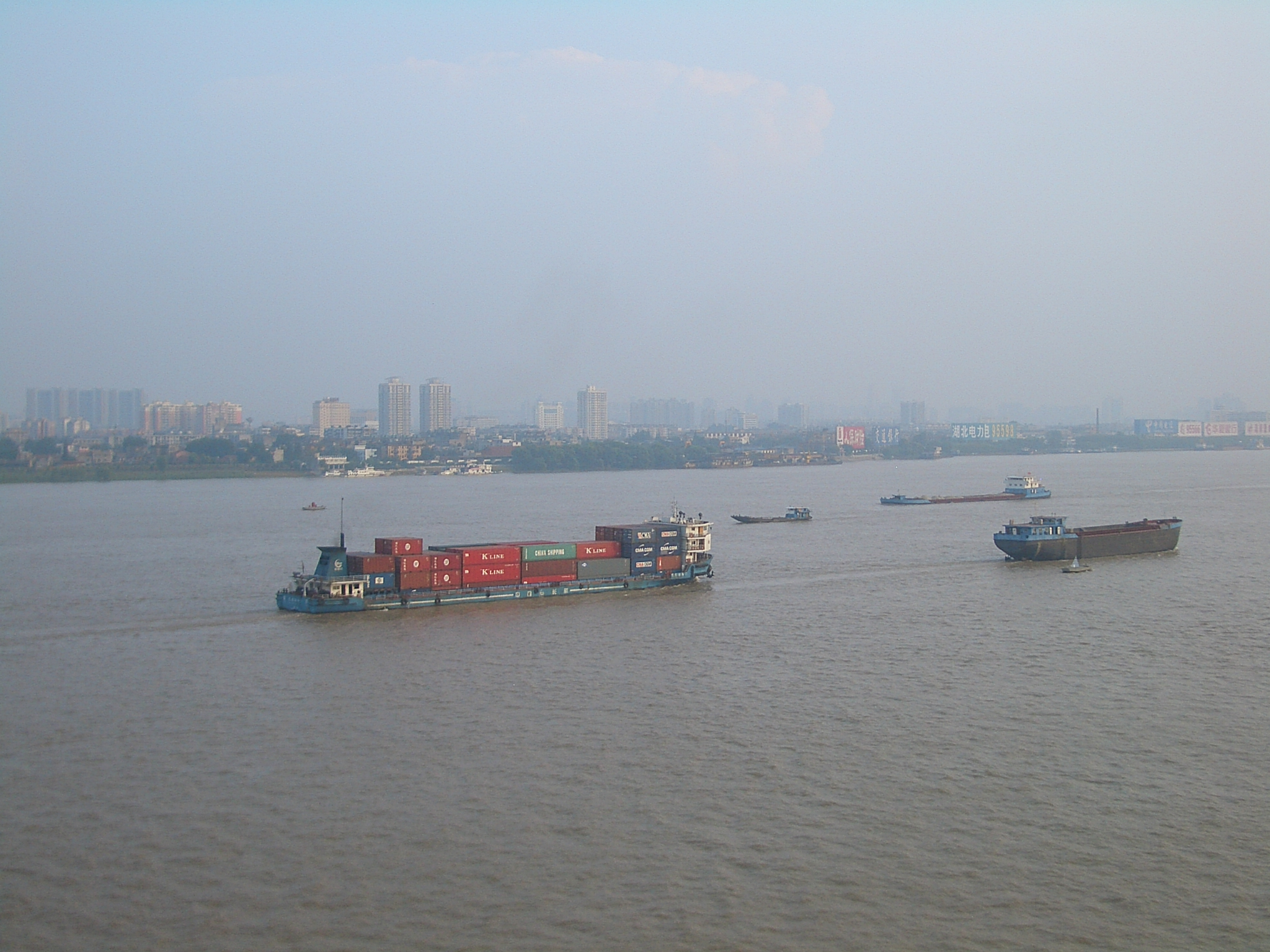
Boats on the Yangtze River in Wuhan

Prior to the construction of China's national railway network, the Yangtze and Hanshui Rivers had been the main transportation arteries of Hubei for many centuries, and still continue to play an important transport role.

Historically, Hubei's overland transport network was hampered by the lack of bridges across the Yangtze River, which divides the province into northern and southern regions. The first bridge across the Yangtze in Hubei, the Wuhan Yangtze River Bridge was completed in 1957, followed by the Zhicheng Bridge in 1971. As of October 2014, Hubei had 23 bridges and tunnels across the Yangtze River, including nine bridges and three tunnels in Wuhan.

=== Rail ===
The railway from Beijing reached Wuhan in 1905, and was later extended to Guangzhou, becoming the first north-to-south railway mainline to cross China. A number of other lines crossed the province later on, including the Jiaozuo–Liuzhou railway and Beijing–Kowloon railway, respectively, in the western and eastern part of the province.

The first decade of the 21st century has seen a large amount of new railway construction in Hubei. The Wuhan–Guangzhou high-speed railway, roughly parallel to the original Wuhan-Guangzhou line, opened in late 2009, it was subsequently extended to the north, to Beijing becoming the Beijing–Guangzhou high-speed railway. An east-west high-speed corridor connecting major cities along the Yangtze, the Shanghai–Wuhan–Chengdu passenger railway was gradually opened between 2008 and 2012, the Wuhan–Yichang railway section of it opening in 2012. The Wuhan–Xiaogan intercity railway was opened in December 2016 and it was extended when the Wuhan–Shiyan high-speed railway opened in November 2019.

=== Air ===
Hubei's main airport is Wuhan Tianhe International Airport. Yichang Sanxia Airport serves the Three Gorges region. There are also passenger airports in Xiangyang, Enshi, and Jingzhou (Shashi Airport, named after the city's Shashi District).

== Tourism ==
The province's best-known natural attraction (shared with the adjacent Chongqing municipality) is the scenic area of the Three Gorges of the Yangtze. Located in the far west of the province, the gorges can be conveniently visited by one of the numerous tourist boats (or regular passenger boats) that travel up the Yangtze from Yichang through the Three Gorges and into the neighboring Chongqing municipality.

The mountains of western Hubei, in particular in Shennongjia District, offer a welcome respite from Wuhan's and Yichang's summer heat, as well as skiing opportunities in winter. The tourist facilities in that area concentrate around Muyu in the southern part of Shennongjia, the gateway to Shennongjia National Nature Reserve (神农架国家自然保护区). Closer to the provincial capital, Wuhan, is the Mount Jiugong (Jiugongshan) national park, in Tongshan County near the border with Jiangxi.

A particular important site of both natural and cultural significance is Mount Wudang (Wudangshan) in the northwest of the province. Originally created early in the Ming dynasty, its building complex has been listed by UNESCO since 1994 as a World Heritage Site.

Other historic attractions in Hubei include:

- The old Jingzhou City

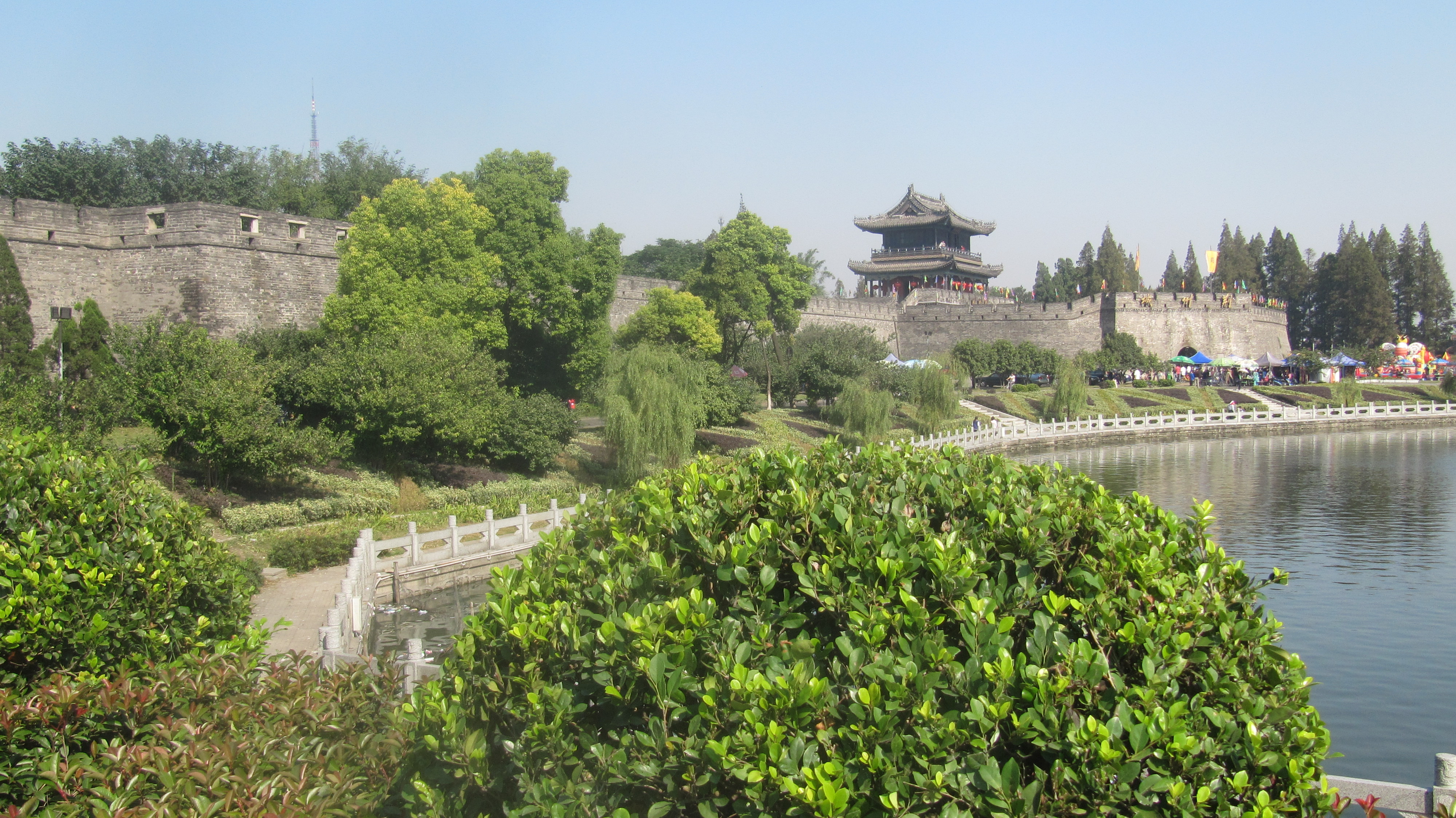
East side of Jingzhou old city wall

- The Xianling Mausoleum, built by the Ming dynasty Jiajing Emperor for his parents at their fief near Zhongxiang
- The Yellow Crane Tower in Wuhan
- The Hubei Provincial Museum in Wuhan, with extensive archaeological and cultural exhibits and performance presentations of ancient music and dance. This is one of the best places to learn about the ancient state of Chu, which flourished in the territory of present-day Hubei during the Eastern Zhou dynasty and developed its own unique culture, quite distinct from that of the Shang/Zhou civilization of northern China.

The province also has historical sites connected with China's more recent history, such as the Wuchang Uprising Memorial in Wuhan, Project 131 site (a Cultural-Revolution-era underground military command center) in Xianning, and the National Mining Park (国家矿山公园) in Huangshi.

== Sports ==
University Stadium of Huazhong University of Science and Technology in Wuhan

Professional sports teams in Hubei include:

- Wuhan Three Towns F.C. plays in Chinese Super League, the highest level football league in China.

== Sister State/Twinning ==
Following a July 1979 State of Ohio Trade Mission to China, Hubei and Ohio formed a sister province-state relationship. The pairing was based on the fact that both Hubei and Ohio are located in national heartlands, are large industrial areas and transportation hubs, and have significant agricultural sectors.

In 2005, Hubei province signed a twinning agreement with Telemark county of Norway, and a "Norway-Hubei Week" was held in 2007.

== See also ==
- 1954 Yangtze River floods
- List of prisons in Hubei
- Major national historical and cultural sites in Hubei
- COVID-19 pandemic
