= Dai Yulin =

Chinese politician (born 1959)

- 戴玉林

Vice Chairperson of the Liaoning Provincial Committee of the Chinese People's Political Consultative Conference
- In office January 2017 – January 2023

Chairman of the Liaoning Provincial Federation of Trade Unions
- In office April 2015 – January 2017
- Preceded by: Zhao Guohong
- Succeeded by: Guan Zhi'ou

Personal details
- Born: April 1959 (age 67) Nanjing, Jiangsu, China
- Party: Chinese Communist Party (1985-)
- Education: Liaoning Institute of Finance and Economics

Dai Yulin (Chinese: 戴玉林; born April 1959) is a retired Chinese politician, who was served as the vice chairperson of the Liaoning Provincial Committee of the Chinese People's Political Consultative Conference and the chairman of the Liaoning Provincial Federation of Trade Unions. He was a delegate to the 18th National Congress of the Chinese Communist Party.

== Career ==
Dai was born in Nanjing in April 1959. In 1978, he was enrolled to the Liaoning Institute of Finance and Economics until 1982. He was served as an assistant teacher of the institute since 1982, until served as a professor in 1998.

Dai was entered politics and served as the director of finance management office of Dalian in April 1998, later he served as the deputy secretary-general and sssistant to the mayor of the Dalian Municipal People's Government. In May 2001, Dai was appointed as the deputy mayor of Dalian, and appointed as the standing member of the CCP Dalian Municipal Committee in May 2008.

In August 2010, Dai was appointed as the party secretary of Dandong. He was appointed as the standing member of the CCP Liaoning Provincial Committee in January 2015.

In April 2015, Dai was appointed as the chairman of the Liaoning Provincial Federation of Trade Unions.

In January 2017, Dai was appointed as the vice chairperson of the Liaoning Provincial Committee of the Chinese People's Political Consultative Conference. He was stepped down this post in January 2023.

== Investigation ==
On 17 September 2026, Dai was suspected of "serious violations of laws and regulations" by the Central Commission for Discipline Inspection (CCDI), the party's internal disciplinary body, and the National Supervisory Commission, the highest anti-corruption agency of China.

Party political offices
Preceded by Xue Heng	Party Secretary of Dandong; 2010－2015	Succeeded by Sun Zhaolin
Civic offices
Preceded by Zhao Guohong	Chairman of the Liaoning Provincial Federation of Trade Unions; 2015－2017	Succeeded by Guan Zhi'ou
