= Guan Zhi'ou =

Chinese politician

- 关志鸥

Party Secretary of Hubei
- Incumbent
- Assumed office 30 May 2026
- Deputy: Li Dianxun; Zhuge Yujie
- Preceded by: Wang Zhonglin

Minister of Natural Resources
- In office 25 December 2024 – May 2026
- Premier: Li Qiang
- Preceded by: Wang Guanghua
- Succeeded by: Vacant

Director of the National Forestry and Grassland Administration
- In office 8 June 2020 – 25 December 2024
- Preceded by: Zhang Jianlong
- Succeeded by: Liu Guohong

Personal details
- Born: December 20, 1969 (age 56) Shenyang, Liaoning, China
- Party: Chinese Communist Party
- Education: Shenyang Normal University; Shenyang Agricultural University

Chinese name
- Simplified Chinese: 关志鸥
- Traditional Chinese: 關志鷗
Transcriptions
Standard Mandarin
- Hanyu Pinyin: Guān Zhì'ōu

Guan Zhi'ou (Chinese: 关志鸥; born 20 December 1969) is a Chinese politician of Manchu ethnicity, currently serving as the party secretary of Hubei. He previously served as the minister of natural resources and the director of the National Forestry and Grassland Administration.

Guan is a representative of the 20th National Congress of the Chinese Communist Party and an alternate of the 20th Central Committee of the Chinese Communist Party. He is a delegate to the 13th National People's Congress.

== Early life and education ==
Guan was born in Shenyang, Liaoning, on 20 December 1969. In 1988, he entered Shenyang Normal University, where he majored in biology education. After graduation in 1992, he did his postgraduate work at Shenyang Agricultural University. He joined the Chinese Communist Party (CCP) in December 1993.

== Career ==
After university in 1995, Guan was assigned to the Agricultural and Economic Department of Shenyang Planning Commission. He was eventually promoted to its director in March 2000. He was deputy director of the Management Committee of Shenyang Agricultural High-tech Development Zone in April 2002 and subsequently deputy director of the Shenyang Foreign Trade and Economic Cooperation Bureau in August 2005. In October 2007, he was named acting magistrate of Faku County, confirmed in December of that same year. He was elevated to party secretary, the top political position in the county, in July 2008. In October 2010, he was appointed director of Shenyang Municipal Planning and Land Resources Bureau, but having held the position for only two years, than he was made vice mayor of Shenyang. Guan briefly served as director of Liaoning Rural Economic Committee in July 2015, secretary-general of Liaoning Provincial People's Government in January 2016, president of Liaoning Provincial Federation of Trade Unions in January 2017. He was also admitted to standing committee member of the CCP Liaoning Provincial Committee, the province's top authority, in December 2016.

Guan was admitted to standing committee member of the CCP Shandong Provincial Committee, the province's top authority, in March 2018. He was head of the Publicity Department of the CCP Shandong Provincial Committee in April 2018, in addition to serving as secretary of the Education Working Committee of the CCP Shandong Provincial Committee and secretary of the Party Committee of Shandong First Medical University.

In May 2020, Guan was transferred to Beijing and appointed director of the National Forestry and Grassland Administration. He was also a member of the Party Group of the Ministry of Natural Resources. On 25 December 2024, he succeeded Wang Guanghua as minister of natural resources. On 30 May 2026, Guan was appointed as the party secretary of Hubei, succeeding Wang Zhonglin.

Government offices
Preceded by Liu Changjiang	Director of Liaoning Rural Economic Committee; 2015–2016	Succeeded by He Huanqiu
Preceded by Zhou Liyuan	Secretary-General of Liaoning Provincial People's Government; 2016–2017	Succeeded by Li Jinke
Preceded by Zhang Jianlong	Director of the National Forestry and Grassland Administration; 2020–2024	Succeeded by Liu Guohong
Preceded by Wang Guanghua	Minister of Natural Resources; 2024–2026	Vacant
Civic offices
Preceded by Dai Yulin	President of Liaoning Provincial Federation of Trade Unions; 2017–2018	Succeeded by Yang Zhonglin
Party political offices
Preceded by Wang Qingxian	Head of the Publicity Department of Shandong Provincial Committee of the Chinese Communist Party; 2018–2020	Succeeded by Yu Jie
Preceded by Wang Zhonglin	Party Secretary of Hubei; 2026–present	Incumbent
