= Dufe =

Dufe or DUFE may refer to

- Sahndra Fon Dufe (born 1989), Cameroon-born actress, author, screenwriter and film producer
- Dongbei University of Finance and Economics in Dalian, China
- DUFE—Surrey International Institute, an academic partnership
