= Xue Heng =

Chinese politician

- 薛恒

Vice Chairman of the Liaoning Provincial Committee of the Chinese People's Political Consultative Conference
- In office January 2016 – August 2021
- Chairman: Xia Deren; Zhou Bo

Vice Governor of Liaoning
- In office January 2011 – January 2016
- Governor: Chen Zhenggao; Li Xi; Chen Qiufa

Personal details
- Born: November 1955 (age 70–71) Suizhong County, Liaoning, China
- Party: Chinese Communist Party (1974–2022; expelled)
- Education: Central Party School of the Chinese Communist Party

Chinese name
- Simplified Chinese: 薛恒
- Traditional Chinese: 薛恆
Transcriptions
Standard Mandarin
- Hanyu Pinyin: Xuē Héng

Xue Heng (Chinese: 薛恒; born November 1955) is a former Chinese politician who spent his entire career in his home-province Liaoning. He was investigated by China's top anti-graft agency, National Supervisory Commission, in August 2021. Previously he served as vice chairman of the Liaoning Provincial Committee of the Chinese People's Political Consultative Conference. He was a delegate to the 17th National Congress of the Chinese Communist Party.

== Biography ==
Xue was born in Suizhong County, Liaoning, in November 1955. In August 1973, he became a teacher at a middle school in Gaotai Township. One year later, he was promoted to become principal of a primary school in Gaotai Township.

He joined the Chinese Communist Party in June 1974, and began his political career in February 1975. He was deputy director of Suizhong County Health Bureau in February 1975, and held that office until January 1978, when he was appointed deputy secretary of Suizhong County Committee of the Communist Youth League of China. After a short term as deputy party secretary of Jiabeiyan Township, he became deputy secretary of Jinzhou Municipal Committee of the Communist Youth League of China in December 1980. In August 1986, he was transferred to the Organization Department of CPC Jinzhou Municipal Committee. In February 1987, he was promoted to be executive deputy magistrate of Heishan County, concurrently as a member of the Standing Committee of the CPC Heishan Provincial Committee, the county's top authority. He served as deputy director of Jinzhou Land Bureau in May 1989, and six months later promoted to the director position. In December 1992 he was promoted to become party secretary of Linghai, a position he held until October 1994. Then he became the deputy head of Liaoning Provincial Civil Affairs Department, rising to head in April 2003. He became party secretary of Dandong, the top political position in the city, in February 2007 before being assigned to the similar position in Yingkou in August 2010. In January 2011, he rose to become vice governor of Liaoning, and served until January 2016. During his tenure, he was responsible for transportation, environmental protection, housing, urban and rural construction, railway and airport construction. He concurrently served as head of Liaoning Provincial Public Security Department from March 2011 to March 2013. He took the position of vice-chairman of the Liaoning Provincial Committee of the Chinese People's Political Consultative Conference, the provincial advisory body, in January 2016, serving until August 2021.

== Downfall ==
On 23 August 2021, he turned himself in and was cooperating with the Central Commission for Discipline Inspection (CCDI), the party's internal disciplinary body, and the National Supervisory Commission, the highest anti-corruption agency of China. Before he stepped town, several of his colleagues and subordinates, such as Liu Qiang, Liu Guoqiang, and Li Wenxi, were sacked for graft.

On 19 February 2022, he was expelled from the Chinese Communist Party. On March 18, he was taken away by the Supreme People's Procuratorate.

Government offices
Preceded by Zhang Yongyin	Head of Liaoning Provincial Civil Affairs Department; 2003–2007	Succeeded by Xu Tienan
Preceded by Li Wenxi	Head of Liaoning Provincial Public Security Department; 2011–2013	Succeeded by Wang Dawei
Party political offices
Preceded by Zhu Shaoyi	Communist Party Secretary of Dandong; 2007–2010	Succeeded by Dai Yulin
Preceded by Zhao Huaming	Communist Party Secretary of Yingkou; 2010–2011	Succeeded by Wei Xiaopeng
