= Li Jinzhu =

Chinese politician

- 李金柱

Vice Chairman of Shaanxi Provincial People's Congress
- In office January 2015 – January 2018
- Chairman: Zhao Zhengyong; Lou Qinjian

Vice Governor of Shaanxi
- In office May 2011 – January 2015
- Governor: Zhao Zhengyong; Lou Qinjian

Personal details
- Born: February 1955 (age 71) Cangzhou, Hebei, China
- Party: Chinese Communist Party (1976–2023; expelled)
- Education: Liaoning Technical University; Central Party School of the Chinese Communist Party

Li Jinzhu (Chinese: 李金柱; pinyin: Lǐ Jīnzhù; born February 1955) is a former Chinese politician who spent most of his career in northwest China's Shaanxi province. He was investigated by China's top anti-graft agency in May 2023. He retired in 2018. Previously he served as vice chairman of Shaanxi Provincial People's Congress and before that, vice governor of Shaanxi.

He was a delegate to the 11th National People's Congress.

== Early life and education ==
Li was born in Cangzhou, Hebei, in February 1955. He joined the Chinese Communist Party (CCP) in May 1976. In 1978, he entered Fuxin Mining Institute (now Liaoning Technical University), where he majored in mine surveying.

== Career in Beijing ==
After graduating in 1982, he was despatched to the Coal Research Institute of the Ministry of Coal Industry (煤炭工业部煤炭科学研究院), where he was eventually promoted to vice president in December 1993 and party secretary in March 1999. He was appointed director of the General Office of National Academy of Governance in November 2001, concurrently serving as director of Research Department in February 2004.

== Career in Shaanxi ==
In April 2006, he was named acting mayor of Yulin, confirmed in January 2007. He rose to become party secretary, the top political position in the city, in February 2008. He also served as chairman of Yulin Municipal People's Congress. In May 2011, he was elevated to vice governor of Shaanxi, and subsequently vice chairman of Shaanxi Provincial People's Congress in January 2015.

== Downfall ==
On 29 May 2023, Li had been suspended for suspected "serious discipline violations" by the Central Commission for Discipline Inspection (CCDI), the party's internal disciplinary body, and the National Supervisory Commission, the highest anti-corruption agency of China. On December 7, he was expelled from the CCP.

On 6 June 2024, Li stood trial at a court in Guangzhou, Guangdong, for alleged bribery-taking. Prosecutors accused Li of taking advantage of his different positions in Shaanxi between 2004 and 2023 to seek profits for various companies and individuals in matters concerning business operations, project contracting, and appointment of officials, in return, he accepted money and property worth over 432 million yuan (about 60.8 million U.S. dollars). On December 25, he was sentenced to death with a two-year reprieve for bribery, he was also deprived of his political rights for life, and ordered by the court to have all his personal assets confiscated and turn over all illicit gains and their interests to the state.

Government offices
Preceded by Wang Dengji	Mayor of Yulin; 2006–2008	Succeeded by Hu Zhiqiang
Party political offices
Preceded by Zhou Yibo	Communist Party Secretary of Yulin; 2008–2011	Succeeded by Hu Zhiqiang
