= Hu Zhiqiang =

Hu Zhiqiang may refer to:

- Jason Hu (born 1948), Taiwanese politician
- Hu Zhiqiang (born 1963), Chinese politician, former Communist Party Secretary of Yulin
- Hu Zhiqiang (born 1962), Chinese politician, vice-chairman of Hubei Provincial People's Congress
- Hu Zhiqiang (diplomat), Chinese diplomat, Ambassador to Chad
- Hu Jhih-ciang (born 1997), Taiwanese actor
