= Zhang Jianlong =

Chinese politician

- 张建龙

Director of the National Forestry and Grassland Administration
- In office June 2015 – June 2020
- Preceded by: Zhao Shucong
- Succeeded by: Guan Zhi'ou

Personal details
- Born: January 1957 (age 69) Hanggin Rear Banner, Inner Mongolia, China
- Party: Chinese Communist Party (1985-2026, expelled)
- Education: Inner Mongolia Agricultural University; Beijing Humanities Correspondence University

Chinese name
- Simplified Chinese: 张建龙
- Traditional Chinese: 張建龍
Transcriptions
Standard Mandarin
- Hanyu Pinyin: Zhāng Jiànlóng

Zhang Jianlong (Chinese: 张建龙; born January 1957) is a former Chinese politician who served as director of the National Forestry and Grassland Administration from 2015 to 2020.

Zhang was a representative of the 17th, 18th, and 19th National Congress of the Chinese Communist Party. He was a member of the 13th National Committee of the Chinese People's Political Consultative Conference.

== Early life and education ==
Zhang was born in Hanggin Rear Banner, Inner Mongolia, in January 1957, while his ancestral home is in Minqin County, Gansu. After resuming the college entrance examination, in 1978, he enrolled at Inner Mongolia Forestry University (now Inner Mongolia Agricultural University), where he majored in sand-control.

== Career ==
After graduation in 1982, Zhang was dispatched to the "Three North" Shelterbelt Construction Bureau of the Ministry of Forestry and over a period of 12 years worked his way up to the position of director in May 1995.

Zhang was transferred to the State Forestry Administration in March 1999 and appointed director of Wildlife Conservation Department, director of Wetland Compliance Office, director of Wildlife Conservation and Nature Reserve Construction Project Management Office, and then director of the Science and Technology Department. In October 2003, he became deputy director of the State Forestry Administration (was reshuffled as National Forestry and Grassland Administration in March 2018), rising to director in June 2015. He also served as commander in chief of the National Forest Fire Prevention Command.

== Investigation ==
On 22 January 2026, Zhang was put under investigation for alleged "serious violations of discipline and laws" by the Central Commission for Discipline Inspection (CCDI), the party's internal disciplinary body, and the National Supervisory Commission, the highest anti-corruption agency of China. Zhang was expelled from the party on 19 October 2026.

Government offices
Preceded by Zhao Shucong	Commander in Chief of the National Forest Fire Prevention Command; 2016–2018	Succeeded by Wang Yong
Preceded by Zhao Shucong	Director of the National Forestry and Grassland Administration; 2015–2020	Succeeded by Guan Zhi'ou
