= Li Chunliang =

Chinese politician (born 1963)

- 李春良

Deputy Director of the National Forestry and Grassland Administration
- In office 23 March 2018 – 31 March 2023

Personal details
- Born: February 1963 (age 63) Bazhou, Hebei
- Party: Chinese Communist Party (1984-2025, expelled)
- Education: University of Science and Technology Beijing; Tsinghua University

Li Chunliang (Chinese: 李春良; born February 1963) is a former Chinese politician, who served as the deputy director of the National Forestry and Grassland Administration from 2018 to 2023.

== Career ==
Li was born in Bazhou, Hebei in February 1963. He was served in Second Artillery Corps from 1980 until 1997. In 1995, he was transferred to local cadre bureau of the Central Organization Department until 2008. In 2008, Li was moved to Jiangxi and appointed as the deputy head of the Organization Department of the CCP Jiangxi Committee. In 2011, Li was returned to the Central Organization Department and appointed as deputy director of the second bureau of cadres. He was promoted to director of the fourth bureau of cadres in 2013.

Li was appointed as the deputy director of the National Forestry Administration in 2016. In 2018, he was appointed as the deputy director of the National Forestry and Grassland Administration after the government reform.

== Investigation ==
On 13 May 2025, Li was put under investigation for alleged "serious violations of discipline and laws" by the Central Commission for Discipline Inspection (CCDI), the party's internal disciplinary body, and the National Supervisory Commission, the highest anti-corruption agency of China. He was expelled from the party and dismissed from posts on 10 November.

On 22 July 2026, Li was sentenced to life imprisonment for taking bribes and bribery by taking advantage of influence.
