= Zhou Bo (politician, born 1962) =

Chinese politician

- 周波

Chairman of the Liaoning Provincial Committee of the Chinese People's Political Consultative Conference
- Incumbent
- Assumed office 30 January 2021
- Preceded by: Xia Deren

Personal details
- Born: June 1962 (age 64) Fengxian County, Shanghai, China
- Party: Chinese Communist Party
- Education: Donghua University; China Europe International Business School

Zhou Bo (Chinese: 周波; pinyin: Zhōu Bō; born June 1962) is a Chinese politician who is the current chairman of the Liaoning Provincial Committee of the Chinese People's Political Consultative Conference.

He was an alternate of the 19th Central Committee of the Chinese Communist Party. He was a representative of the 20th National Congress of the Chinese Communist Party.

== Biography ==
Zhou was born in Tairi Township (now Jinhui Town), Fengxian County (now Fengxian District), Shanghai, in June 1962. In 1980, he entered East China Institute of Textile Science and Technology (now Donghua University), majoring in chemical engineering automation and instruments.

After graduating in 1984, Zhou became a designer at the Shanghai Electrochemical Plant Design Office. Starting in August 1985, he served in several posts in Shanghai Chlor Alkali General Plant (later renamed Shanghai Chlor Alkali Chemical Co., Ltd.), including technician, deputy director of Instrument Workshop, assistant director of PVC Factory, deputy director of PVC Factory, assistant general manager, and general manager. He also served as general manager of Shanghai Tianyuan (Group) Co., Ltd. from January 1996 to June 2000. In June 2000, he became vice president of Shanghai Huayi (Group) Co., Ltd., rising to president in August 2002.

Zhou began his political career in July 2005, when he was appointed director of Shanghai Foreign Economic and Trade Commission (Foreign Investment Commission). He was deputy secretary-general of Shanghai Municipal People's Government in March 2007, in addition to serving as director of Shanghai Development and Reform Commission since February 2008. On 21 December 2015, he was given a serious warning within the Party because he accepted a banquet with public funds in violation of the rules and regulations. In December 2016, he was chosen as director of the Administrative Committee of China (Shanghai) Pilot Free-Trade Zone and was admitted to member of the Standing Committee of the CCP Shanghai Municipal Committee, the city's top authority.

In February 2019, he was assigned to northeastern China's Liaoning province and appointed deputy party secretary. In January 2021, he took office as chairman of the Liaoning Provincial Committee of the Chinese People's Political Consultative Conference, the province's top political advisory body.

Government offices
Preceded by Jiang Yingshi	Director of Shanghai Development and Reform Commission; 2008–2013	Succeeded by Yu Beihua
Preceded by Ying Yong	Executive Vice Mayor of Shanghai Municipal People's Government; 2017–2019	Succeeded by Chen Yin
Party political offices
Preceded by Yi Lianhong	Deputy Communist Party Secretary of Liaoning; 2019–2021	Succeeded by Hu Yuting
Assembly seats
Preceded by Xia Deren	Chairman of the Liaoning Provincial Committee of the Chinese People's Political Consultative Conference; 2021–	Incumbent
