= Wang Dawei =

Chinese politician

- 王大伟

Vice Governor of Liaoning
- In office 24 February 2017 – 1 March 2022
- Governor: Chen Qiufa; Tang Yijun; Liu Ning; Li Lecheng

Head of Liaoning Provincial Public Security Department
- In office 29 March 2013 – 1 March 2022
- Preceded by: Xue Heng
- Succeeded by: Zheng Yi

Personal details
- Born: April 1964 (age 62) Wangkui County, Heilongjiang, China
- Party: Chinese Communist Party (1984-2022; expelled)
- Education: Northeast Forestry University; Harbin Institute of Technology

Chinese name
- Simplified Chinese: 王大伟
- Traditional Chinese: 王大偉
Transcriptions
Standard Mandarin
- Hanyu Pinyin: Wáng Dàwěi

Wang Dawei (Chinese: 王大伟; born April 1964) is a former Chinese politician who served as vice governor of Liaoning from 2017 to 2022. He was investigated by China's top anti-graft agency in March 2022.

== Early life and education ==
Wang was born in Wangkui County, Heilongjiang, in April 1964. In 1983, he was accepted to Northeast Forestry University, majoring in logging engineering.

== Career ==
Wang joined the Chinese Communist Party (CCP) in December 1984. In 1990, he worked in the State Forestry Investment Corporation after university. In January 1992, he was assigned to the State Economic and Trade Commission (now National Development and Reform Commission), where he worked until 1998. In September 1998, he became deputy director of Marketing Department of China Unicom, and three months later, he was despatched to the China Development Research Foundation.

In June 2001, he was transferred to his home-province Heilongjiang and appointed vice mayor of Harbin, capital of the province. He was appointed secretary of the Harbin Municipal Political and Legal Affairs Commission in January 2007 and was admitted to member of the standing committee of the CCP Harbin Municipal Committee, the city's top authority. In August 2009, he was made deputy head of Heilongjiang Provincial Public Security Department.

In March 2013, he was promoted to become head of Liaoning Provincial Public Security Department, concurrently serving as vice governor of Liaoning since February 2017.

== Downfall ==
On 1 March 2022, Wang was put under investigation for alleged "serious violations of discipline and laws" by the Central Commission for Discipline Inspection (CCDI), the party's internal disciplinary body, and the National Supervisory Commission, the highest anti-corruption agency of China. He is the fourth head of Liaoning Provincial Public Security Department and the eleventh police chief in China caught since the crackdown was launched in 2012, after Li Feng, Li Wenxi and Xue Heng.

On 14 October 2024, Wang was sentenced to death sentence with reprieve without commutation or parole when the sentence was automatically reduced to life imprisonment for bribery.

Government offices
Preceded by Xue Heng	Head of Liaoning Provincial Public Security Department; 2013–2022	Succeeded by Zheng Yi
