= Hu Fuguo =

Chinese politician

- 胡富国

Chairman of Shanxi Provincial Committee of the Chinese People's Political Consultative Conference
- In office March 1994 – February 1995
- Preceded by: Wang Maolin
- Succeeded by: Guo Yuhuai

Party Secretary of Shanxi
- In office September 1993 – June 1999
- Preceded by: Wang Maolin
- Succeeded by: Tian Chengping

Governor of Shanxi
- In office July 1992 – September 1993
- Preceded by: Wang Senhao
- Succeeded by: Sun Wensheng

Personal details
- Born: October 1937 (age 88–89) Zhangzi County, Shanxi, China
- Party: Chinese Communist Party
- Spouse: Chang Genxiu
- Children: Hu Zhiqiang; Hu Wenqiang
- Education: Liaoning Technical University

Chinese name
- Traditional Chinese: 胡富國
- Simplified Chinese: 胡富国
Transcriptions
Standard Mandarin
- Hanyu Pinyin: Hū Fùguó

Hu Fuguo (Chinese: 胡富国; born October 1937) is a Chinese politician currently serving as president of China Association of Poverty Alleviation & Development. He was Communist Party Secretary, Governor and CPPCC chairman of his home province Shanxi.

He was a delegate to the 13th and 19th National Congress of the Chinese Communist Party. He was a member of the 14th and 15th Central Committee of the Chinese Communist Party.

Hu was a powerful provincial official in home-province Shanxi in the 1990s. During his tenure, he focused on energy alternatives, water development and conservation, the environment, education, economic development, and supervised the construction of Taiyuan-Jiuguan Expressway, Taiyuan Wusu International Airport, and Taiyuan railway station. At the same time, with his name and political influence, his sons Hu Zhiqiang and Hu Wenqiang experienced a meteoric rise in local politics and local state-owned enterprises. But Hu Zhiqiang was sacked for purchasing offices and selling offices and collusion between officials and businessmen.

== Early life and education ==
Hu was born into poverty in Xiahuo Village (下霍村) of Zhangzi County, Shanxi, in October 1937, after the Second Sino-Japanese War broke out. Both his parents were poor farmers. He had eleven siblings, but only him and two younger sisters survived. His mother died young and the three of them were raised by his father.

After middle school in 1957, Hu entered the workforce as accountant in local people's commune. In 1958 he was accepted to the newly established Vestibule School of Coal, which was attached to Lu'an Bureau of Mines (潞安矿务局), and he joined the Chinese Communist Party in the next year. In October 1960 he enrolled at the Fuxin College of Mines (now Liaoning Technical University), where he majored in mining.

== Career ==
After graduating in 1964, Hu was assigned to Datong Bureau of Mines (大同矿务局) in Datong, a city rich in coal resources in his home-province. He spent almost 20 years working at the province's institutes about coal resources before serving as vice-minister of Coal Industry in Beijing.

In 1988 he was appointed vice-minister of Energy, he concurrently served as general manager and party branch secretary of China Unified distribution Coal Mine Corporation, a state-owned company. In the Spring of 1990, People's Daily published an article titled "The Vice Minister's Wife Burns the Boilers" and subsequently published another article "Secretary of the Provincial Party Committee's Black Lammy", praising Hu was a clear official and good official.

In July 1992, Hu was transferred back to Taiyuan, capital of Shanxi province, where he was appointed deputy party chief and acting governor of Shanxi. In early 1993 he was installed as governor of Shanxi, replacing Wang Senhao. In September of that year, he was promoted to party chief of Shanxi, the top political position in the province, where he served until June 1999. He concurrently served as CPPCC Committee chairman of Shanxi between March 1994 and February 1995. During his term in office, he focused on energy alternatives, water development and conservation, the environment, education, economic development, he also undertook major improvements to the province's infrastructure, and supervised the construction of Taiyuan-Jiuguan Expressway, Taiyuan Wusu International Airport, and Taiyuan railway station.

In June 1999, Hu was transferred to Beijing again and was appointed as deputy director of the Department for Poverty Alleviation of the State Council, a position at ministerial level. He served in the post until he retirement in May 2005. Now he is the president of China Association of Poverty Alleviation & Development.

== Personal life ==
Hu married Chang Genxiu (常根秀). The couple has two sons: Hu Zhiqiang and Hu Wenqiang (胡文强). Hu and his family are Buddhist believers, they built a Buddhist temple named "Anle Temple" (安乐寺; 'Temple of Safe and Happy') in their hometown. In the temple there is a jade statue of Guanyin worthing 200 million yuan. Every year during the Chinese New Year, businessmen drive to their home to pay New Year's greetings.

Hu Zhiqiang was Mayor of Yulin, Communist Party Secretary of Yulin, and Party Branch Secretary of Shaanxi Provincial Health and Family Planning Commission before he was placed under investigation by the Chinese Communist Party's anti-corruption agency in June 2018.

Hu Wenqiang is now the deputy general manager of Shanxi Coking Coal Group Co., Ltd. (山西焦煤集团有限责任公司), a state owned company headquartered in Taiyuan, capital of Shanxi province. He is also the party chief and chairman of the board of Nanfeng Chemical Industry Share Holding Co., Ltd (南风化工集团股份有限公司), which headquartered in Yuncheng, Shanxi province.

Party political offices
Preceded by Wang Maolin	Party Secretary of Shanxi; 1993–1999	Succeeded by Tian Chengping
Government offices
Preceded by Wang Senhao	Governor of Shanxi; 1992–1993	Succeeded by Sun Wensheng
Preceded by Wang Maolin	CPPCC Committee chairman of Shanxi; 1994–1995	Succeeded by Guo Yuhuai
