= Guo Yuhuai =

Chinese politician

Guo Yuhuai (Chinese: 郭裕怀; born October 1934) is a Chinese politician. He was born in Xiaoyi, Shanxi. He graduated from Shanxi University. He was vice-governor and CPPCC Committee Chairman of his home province.

Preceded by Hu Fuguo	CPPCC Chairman of Shanxi; 1995–2000	Succeeded by Tian Chengping
