= Liu Guoqiang =

Chinese politician (born 1953)

- 刘国强

Vice-Chairman of the Liaoning Provincial Committee of the Chinese People's Political Consultative Conference (CPPCC)
- In office January 2013 – January 2017
- Chairman: Xia Deren

Vice-Governor of Liaoning
- In office May 2001 – January 2013
- Governor: Bo Xilai→Zhang Wenyue→Chen Zhenggao

Mayor of Benxi
- In office March 2000 – May 2001
- Preceded by: Wu Qicheng
- Succeeded by: Li Bo

Personal details
- Born: December 1953 (age 72) Benxi, Liaoning, China
- Party: Chinese Communist Party (expelled)
- Spouse: Chen Chiping
- Education: Dalian Jiaotong University; Northeastern University
- Occupation: Engineer, politician

Chinese name
- Traditional Chinese: 劉國強
- Simplified Chinese: 刘国强
Transcriptions
Standard Mandarin
- Hanyu Pinyin: Liú Guóqiáng

Liu Guoqiang (Chinese: 刘国强; born December 1953) is a former Chinese politician. He spent his entire career in his home-province Liaoning. He was investigated by the Central Commission for Discipline Inspection in July 2020, and has since retired. Prior to that, he served as vice-chairman of the Liaoning Provincial Committee of the Chinese People's Political Consultative Conference (CPPCC) from 2013 to 2017, vice-governor of Liaoning from 2001 to 2013, and mayor of Benxi from 2000 to 2001. He was a delegate to the 10th and 11th National People's Congress.

In November 2022, Liu was sentenced to death with a two-year reprieve for bribery.

== Early life and education ==
Liu was born in Benxi, Liaoning, in December 1953. After the outbreak of the Cultural Revolution, he became a sent-down youth in his home-county for a short time. In September 1970, he joined as a worker at the Department of Transport of Benxi Iron and Steel Company, where he worked for almost eight years. In March 1978, he was accepted to Dalian Railway Institute (now Dalian Jiaotong University). After graduating in January 1982, he continued to work at Benxi Iron and Steel Company. He served in various posts before serving as general manager in May 1997.

== Political career ==
He began his political career in March 2000, when he was appointed Chinese Communist Party Deputy Committee Secretary, vice-mayor and acting mayor of Benxi. After just one year and two months, he was elevated to vice-governor of Liaoning, a position he held until January 2013. During his term in office, he was in charge of industry and production safety. In February 2005, the 2005 Sunjiawan mine disaster occurred, at least 214 coal miners were killed, he was suspended and made a self-criticism. Then he became the vice-chairman of the Liaoning Provincial Committee of the Chinese People's Political Consultative Conference (CPPCC), and served in the post until his retirement in January 2017.

== Investigation ==
On July 13, 2020, he was put under investigation for alleged "serious violations of discipline and laws", the Central Commission for Discipline Inspection said in a statement on its website, without elaborating.

On January 11, 2021, he was expelled from the Chinese Communist Party and dismissed from public office. Prosecutors signed an arrest order for him on January 22.

On November 8, 2022, Liu was sentenced to death with a two-year reprieve for taking bribes over 352 million yuan (48 million U.S. dollars) by the Tianjin First Intermediate People's Court.

== Personal life ==
Liu married Chen Chiping (陈持平), who died in a plane crash on June 1, 2009. Liu and his late wife were alleged to have used public money to pay for an expensive overseas holiday disguised as a business trip.

Government offices
| Preceded by Wu Qicheng (吴启成) | Mayor of Benxi; 2000-2001 | Succeeded by Li Bo (李波) |
