= Wang Guanghua =

Chinese politician

- 王广华
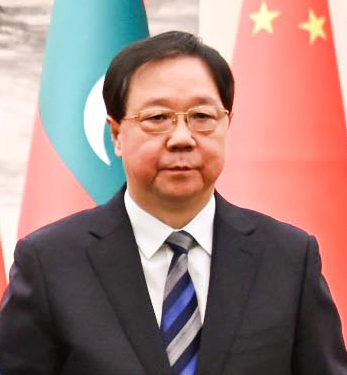
- Wang in January 2024

Minister of Natural Resources
- In office 24 June 2022 – 25 December 2024
- Premier: Li Keqiang; Li Qiang
- Preceded by: Lu Hao
- Succeeded by: Guan Zhi'ou

Personal details
- Born: January 1963 (age 63) Xingyang County, Henan, China
- Party: Chinese Communist Party
- Education: Peking University

Chinese name
- Simplified Chinese: 王广华
- Traditional Chinese: 王廣華
Transcriptions
Standard Mandarin
- Hanyu Pinyin: Wáng Guǎnghuá

Wang Guanghua (Chinese: 王广华; born January 1963) is a Chinese politician who was the Minister of Natural Resources, in office since June 2022 to December 2024.

== Biography ==
Wang was born in Xingyang County (now Xingyang), Henan, in January 1963. After the gaokao resumed in 1979, he entered Peking University, majoring in economic geography.

After university in 1983, he was assigned as an official to the Land Administration Bureau of the Ministry of Agriculture, Animal Husbandry and Fishery. He joined the Chinese Communist Party (CCP) in December 1987. He served in various posts in the State Land Administration before serving as deputy director of the Cadastral Management Division of the Ministry of Land and Resources in July 1998, and director in September 2014, interspersed with five years as director of Wuhan Bureau of the State Land Supervision from December 2008 to December 2013. In July 2015, he became vice minister of natural resources, rising to minister in June 2022. In October 2022, Wang was elected as a full member of the 20th Central Committee of the Chinese Communist Party. He was succeeded as Minister by Guan Zhi'ou on 25 December 2024.

Government offices
Preceded by Lu Hao	Minister of Natural Resources; 2022–2024	Succeeded by Guan Zhi'ou
