= Jia Zhibang =

Chinese politician

Jia Zhibang (Chinese: 贾治邦; born November 1946) is a Chinese politician, who served between 2005 and 2012 as the Director of State Forestry Administration. He also previously held the post of Governor of Shaanxi.

== Career ==
Born in Wuqi, Shaanxi Province, Jia graduated from Renmin University of China, majoring in national economic management. He joined Chinese Communist Party (CCP) in April 1962, and had served in various posts in Shaanxi for many years. In May 1993, he was promoted to the Chinese Communist Party Provincial Standing Committee, and the vice governor of Shaanxi. Later, he became CCP Deputy Committee Secretary of Shaanxi, acting governor and later governor.

In October 2004, Jia was transferred to Beijing and was appointed as executive deputy Minister of Civil Affairs (minister-rank). In December 2005, he became the director of State Forestry Administration.

On June 5, 2007, the World Wide Fund for Nature awarded Jia Outstanding Leadership Prize for Natural Protection", in recognition of efforts and achievements of State Forestry Administration of PRC on natural protection.

In 2012, Jia retired from active politics after having reached the mandatory retirement age of 65 for minister-level officials; he then became a member of the committee on population and environment of the Chinese People's Political Consultative Conference.

He holds the title of economist. He was an alternative member of 14th and 15th Central Committees of the Chinese Communist Party, and a full member of 16th and 17th Central Committees.

Political offices
Preceded by Zhou Shengxian	Director of State Forestry Administration; 2005–2012	Succeeded by Zhao Shucong
Preceded by Cheng Andong	Governor of Shaanxi; 2002–2004	Succeeded by Chen Deming
