= Wang Senhao =

Chinese politician (1933–2022)

Wang Senhao (Chinese: 王森浩; January 1933 – 10 April 2022) was a People's Republic of China politician. He was born in Cixi City, Zhejiang. He joined the Chinese Communist Party in 1955. He was governor of Shanxi. Wang died on 10 April 2022, at the age of 89.

Preceded by Luo Guibo	Governor of Shanxi; 1983–1992	Succeeded by Hu Fuguo
