= Zhao Shucong =

Chinese politician

- 赵树丛

Director of State Forestry Bureau
- In office March 2012 – July 2015
- Preceded by: Jia Zhibang
- Succeeded by: Zhang Jianlong

Personal details
- Born: March 1955 (age 71) Zhucheng County, Shandong, China
- Party: Chinese Communist Party
- Education: Shandong University; Dalian University of Technology

Chinese name
- Simplified Chinese: 赵树丛
- Traditional Chinese: 趙樹叢
Transcriptions
Standard Mandarin
- Hanyu Pinyin: Zhào Shùcóng

Zhao Shucong (Chinese: 赵树丛; born March 1955) is a Chinese politician who served as director of State Forestry Bureau from 2012 to 2015.

Zhao was a representative of the 14th, 16th, 17th, and 18th National Congress of the Chinese Communist Party. He was a member of the 18th Central Committee of the Chinese Communist Party. He was a delegate to the 9th National People's Congress. He was a member of the 8th National Committee of the Chinese People's Political Consultative Conference.

== Early life and education ==
Zhao was born in Zhucheng County (now Zhucheng), Shandong, in March 1955. He was a barefoot doctor (赤脚医生) in his home-county between June 1969 and April 1972. Then he enrolled at Shandong Medical College (now Shandong University), where he majored in medicine. He joined the Chinese Communist Party (CCP) in January 1973.

== Career ==
After college in 1975, Zhao stayed for teaching.

In August 1985, Zhao became a standing committee member of the Shandong Provincial Committee of the Communist Youth League of China and was appointed head of the Publicity Department. In January 1986, he became deputy party secretary, rising to party secretary in August 1992.

Zhao was deputy party secretary and mayor of Tai'an in December 1997 before being assigned to the similar position in Anqing, Anhui in December 1998. He rose to party secretary, the top political position in the city, in February 2001. His first foray into a prefectural leadership role. He was elevated to vice governor of Anhui in January 2003 and three years later was admitted to standing committee member of the CCP Anhui Provincial Committee, the province's top authority.

In April 2011, Zhao was transferred to Beijing and appointed deputy director of State Forestry Bureau, and eleven months later promoted to the director position.

Government offices
Preceded by ?	Mayor of Tai'an; 1997–1998	Succeeded by ?
Preceded by Zhou Gongshun	Mayor of Anqing; 1998–2001	Succeeded by Han Xiancong
Preceded by Sun Zhigang	Executive Vice Governor of Anhui; 2010–2011	Succeeded by Zhan Xialai
Preceded by Jia Zhibang	Director of State Forestry Bureau; 2012–2015	Succeeded by Zhang Jianlong
Party political offices
Preceded by Chen Lűxiang	Communist Party Secretary of Anqing; 2001–2003	Succeeded by Han Xiancong
