= Liaoning Provincial Committee of the Chinese People's Political Consultative Conference =

Liaoning Provincial Committee of the Chinese People's Political Consultative Conference 中国人民政治协商会议辽宁省委员会
- 13th
- Emblem of the Chinese People's Political Consultative Conference

Type
- Type: United front organ Constitutional convention (Historical); Legislature (Historical) of Chinese People's Political Consultative Conference

History
- Founded: March 1955; 71 years ago
- Preceded by: Liaoning Provincial People's Congress Consultative Committee

Leadership
- Chairperson: Zhou Bo

Website
- www.lnzx.gov.cn

Chinese name
- Simplified Chinese: 中国人民政治协商会议辽宁省委员会
- Traditional Chinese: 中國人民政治協商會議遼寧省委員會
Transcriptions
Standard Mandarin
- Hanyu Pinyin: Zhōngguó Rénmín Zhèngzhì Xiéshāng Huìyì Liáoníngshěng Wěiyuánhuì

Abbreviation
- Simplified Chinese: 辽宁省政协
- Traditional Chinese: 遼寧省政協
- Literal meaning: CPPCC Liaoning Provincial Committee
Transcriptions
Standard Mandarin
- Hanyu Pinyin: Liáoníngshěng Zhèngxié

The Liaoning Provincial Committee of the Chinese People's Political Consultative Conference (Chinese: 中国人民政治协商会议辽宁省委员会; abbreviation CPPCC Liaoning Provincial Committee) is the provincial advisory body and a local organization of the Chinese People's Political Consultative Conference in Liaoning, China. It is supervised and directed by the Liaoning Provincial Committee of the Chinese Communist Party.

== History ==
The Liaoning Provincial Committee of the Chinese People's Political Consultative Conference traces its origins to the Liaoning Provincial People's Congress Consultative Committee (辽宁省各界人民代表会议协商委员会), founded in 1949.

== Term ==
=== 1st ===
- Term: March 1955–June 1959
- Chairperson: Huang Oudong
- Vice Chairmen: Zhang Xuexuan, Ning Wu, Che Xiangchen, Jin Shuliang, Chen Xianzhou, Gong Tianmin, Chen Beichen (from May 1956–), Wang Jiashan (from May 1957–)

=== 2nd ===
- Term: June 1959–December 1963
- Chairperson: Huang Huoqing
- Vice Chairmen: Zhang Xuexuan, Ning Wu, Che Xiangchen, Jin Shuliang, Chen Xianzhou, Gong Tianmin, Chen Beichen, Wang Jiashan, Chen Enfeng, Han Pengtai

=== 3rd ===
- Term: December 1963–December 1977
- Chairperson: Huang Huoqing
- Vice Chairmen: Ning Wu, Che Xiangchen, Jin Shuliang, Chen Xianzhou, Gong Tianmin, Chen Beichen, Wang Jiashan, Chen Enfeng, Han Pengtai, Li Weimin, Zhang Yan (from December 1965–), Jing Jie (from December 1965–), Sun Wencai (from December 1965–)

=== 4th ===
- Term: December 1977–April 1983
- Chairperson: Huang Oudong (–January 1980) → Li Huang (January 1980–March 1982) → Song Li (March 1982–)
- Vice Chairmen: Chou Youwen, Zhou Huan, Huang Da, Gong Tianmin, Zhang Ziheng, Qu Jing, Wang Kuncheng, Chen Beichen, Wang Jiashan, Zhang Qingtai, Chen Enfeng, Zhang Yan, Lou Erkang, Ren Zhiyuan, Chen Meifu, Liu Duoquan, Shen Hongtao, Niu Pingfu, Liu Baotian (from January 1980–), Tang Duo (from January 1980–), Zhao Zhuohua (from January 1980–), Yan Dingchu (from January 1980–), Chen Fang (from January 1980–), Liu Mingjiu (from January 1980–), Lu Guangji (from January 1980–), Jiang Peilu (from January 1980–), Wei Zhi (from January 1980–), Miao Baotai (from January 1980–), Li Songtang (from January 1980–), Wu Yousan (from January 1980–), Zhao Longtao (from January 1980–), Gu Xueqiu (from January 1980–), Li Dongchao (from January 1980–), Li Wenfu (from January 1980–), Fang Ming (from January 1980–), Liu Zhongming (from March 1982–), Wu Jian'an (from March 1982–), Ma Longxiang (from March 1982–)

=== 5th ===
- Term: April 1983–January 1988
- Chairperson: Song Li → Xu Shaofu (from July 1985–)
- Vice Chairmen: Wang Kuncheng, Chen Enfeng, Zhang Yan, Liu Zhongming, Chen Yanzhi, Niu Pingfu, Yu Jingqing, Liu Mingjiu, Lu Guangji, Zhao Longtao, Gu Xueqiu, Ma Longxiang, Yue Weichun, Liu Qingkui (from July 1985–)

=== 6th ===
- Term: January 1988–March 1993
- Chairperson: Xu Shaofu
- Vice Chairmen: Shen Xianhui, Chen Enfeng, Chen Yanzhi, Niu Pingfu, Liu Mingjiu, Lu Guangji, Gu Xueqiu, Ma Longxiang, Yue Weichun, Liu Qingkui, Peng Xiangsong, Li Qisheng, Li Ming, Wang Shuzhi, Lin Sheng (from March 1992–), Gao Qingzhou (from March 1992–)

=== 7th ===
- Term: March 1993–January 1998
- Chairperson: Sun Qi
- Vice Chairmen: Lin Sheng, Liu Mingjiu, Yue Weichun, Wang Shuzhi, Gao Qingzhou, Zhang Lingyun, Zhang Chenglun, Gong Shiping, Ma Pinfang, Liu Qingkui (Died December 1993), Li Guozhong (from February 1995–), Cong Zhenglong (from February 1996–)

=== 8th ===
- Term: January 1998–January 2003
- Chairperson: Sun Qi
- Vice Chairmen: Xiao Zuofu, Li Guozhong, Zhang Chenglun, Gong Shiping, Lü Binghua, Zhang Yumao, Jiang Xiaoqin, Guo Yanjie, Chen Hongduo, Wang Zhishi

=== 9th ===
- Term: January 2003–January 2008
- Chairperson: Zhang Wenyue
- Vice Chairmen: Dong Wande, Zhang Chenglun, Zhao Xinliang, Zhang Yumao, Jiang Xiaoqin, Wang Zhishi, Zhang Chuanqing, He Min, Sun Guifen, Jin Guosheng

=== 10th ===
- Term: January 2008–January 2013
- Chairperson: Luo Lin
- Vice Chairmen: Hu Xiaohua, Gao Peng, Wang Zhishi, He Min, Jin Guosheng, Cheng Yajun, Li Wenxi, Liu Zhengkui, Li Xiao'an
- Secretary-General: Wei Min (– January 2011) → Sun Yuanliang (January 2011–December 2011) → Shi Guiru (December 2011–)

=== 11th ===
- Term: January 2013–January 2018
- Chairperson: Xia Deren
- Vice Chairmen: Liu Guoqiang, Gao Peng, Sun Yuanliang, Teng Weiping, Li Xiao'an, Tang Jianwu, Chen Tiexin, Wang Song, Wu Xianhua
- Secretary-General: Cui Desheng

=== 12th ===
- Term: January 2018–January 2023
- Chairperson: Xia Deren (–January 2021) → Zhou Bo (January 2021–)
- Vice Chairmen: Li Xiao'an, Wu Xianhua, Dai Yulin, Gang Rui, Jiang Jun, Zhao Yanqing, Xu Bo, Gao Ke, Chen Xiangqun (from January 2022–), Fan Jiying (from January 2022–)
- Secretary-General: Li Shumin (–January 2021) → Wang Dejia (from January 2022–)

=== 13th ===
- Term: January 2023–2028
- Chairperson: Zhou Bo
- Vice Chairmen: Wang Mingyu, Jiang Jun, Zhao Yanqing, Lu Ke, Yu Gongbin, Wen Xueqiong (female), Liu Zhongmin, Shao Lin (female), Yu Tianmin (elected January 2024), Chu Tianyun (January 2025–July 2025)
- Secretary-General: Shao Lin (concurrently)
