= Luo Guibo =

Chinese diplomat and politician

Luo Guibo (Chinese: 罗贵波; Vietnamese: La Quý Ba) (1907–1995) was a Chinese diplomat and People's Republic of China politician. He was born in Nankang County, Jiangxi (modern Nankang, Ganzhou).

He was the first Chinese ambassador to North Vietnam in September 1954. From October 1957 to October 1970, he was China's Vice-Minister of Foreign Affairs. During Hong Kong's 1967 riots, he denounced the British colonial government's "atrocities", "sanguinary oppression" and "collusion with American imperialism against China" in a formal protest presented to the British chargé d'affaires in Beijing.

He was the author of the book Revolutionary Recollections.

== Presence of Luo Guibo and Chinese advisors in North Vietnam ==
On 1 October 1949, People's Republic of China (PRC) was founded under the administration of the Chinese Communist Party (CCP) after eight-year-long anti-Japanese war and four-year-long Civil War. Having faced an extremely difficult situation in the fourth year of the French-Indochina War, in December 1949, Hồ Chí Minh dispatched two representatives, Lý Bích Sơn and Nguyễn Đức Thủy, to Beijing with a request for Chinese assistance and for diplomatic recognition for his government. Upon receiving Hồ Chí Minh's request, acting chairman of the Central Committee of the CCP Liu Shaoqi— known in Vietnamese as Lưu Thiếu Kỳ — convened a 24 December meeting of the CCP Politburo to determine the situation in Indochina. Four days later, Liu cabled Hồ Chí Minh on behalf of the CCP Central Committee to specify that the PRC would meet Hồ's request.

First, China agreed to enter into diplomatic relations with the DRV, and that the PRC government would send a team to Vietnam to assess the DRV's needs. In fact, China's assistance based on some complicated considerations. From a geopolitical point of view, it seemed to make sense to Chinese leaders that China could secure its southwestern border, earn Soviet aid and technology, and modernize its armed forces by helping the DRV fight the French forces. Besides, the worldwide expectation and international reputation could be another rationale. Such revolutionary internationalism was widely expected by all Asian Communist parties after the CCP's founding of the People's Republic. Helping Vietnam in this sense could achieve more international reputation for China. The PRC announced its recognition of the DRV on 18 January 1950, followed by the Soviet Union's recognition on 30 January, marking that the DRC's isolation for four years and three months after the establishment of the DRV was over.

As for Chinese assistance requested by Hồ Chí Minh, Liu Shaoqi, with authorization given by Mao while the latter was visiting Moscow, selected Luo Guibo as the liaison representative of the CCP Central Committee. Luo was chosen because his experience as a guerrilla leader gave him the grounding to manage a Chinese advisory mission in Vietnam. Luo's mission as PRC liaison representative to DRV included establishing contact with the Vietnamese Communists, investigating the general situation in Vietnam and reporting his findings to Beijing so that Chinese leaders could make decisions on assisting the Vietnamese Communists. Luo and his team were dispatched on a secret mission to Vietnam on 16 January 1950 and arrived in Vietnam on 26 February 1950. Accompanying Luo on the trip to Vietnam was a staff of eight, including a telegraph operator, secretaries and guards. The initial plan for Luo was to stay in Vietnam for three months, but he stayed for seven years, until 1957. His first assignment was as the head of the Chinese Political Advisory Group (CPAG) in the DRV from 1951 to 1954, and the following three years until 1957 he served as China's ambassador to the DRV.

== Involvement in Vietnamese affairs ==
During his first few years in Vietnam, Luo Guibo helped establish the Chinese Military Advisory Group (CMAG) and the Chinese Political Advisory Group (CPAG)). As head of CPAG, Luo led more than one hundred advisors with expertise in finance, banking and grain supply work to advise the DRV on military affairs, finance and the economy, public security, culture and education, united front activities, party consolidation and legal reform. Their work entailed introducing Chinese experiences to the Vietnamese; developing macro-level strategies and policymaking procedures; making recommendations on issues pertaining to rules, regulations, and directives; and helping the Vietnamese carry out orders and implement programmes. By 1952 these advisors had become instrumental in helping Hồ Chí Minh and his government introduce the legal apparatuses and policies to consolidate military and socio-political power.

=== Warfare ===
China's actual involvement in Vietnam began with the Border Campaign in the fall of 1950. The idea of the campaign first emerged during Hồ's early 1950 visit to Beijing. Both Chinese and Vietnamese communist leaders believe that a victory in such a campaign would enable the Viet Minh's base areas to be directly backed by the PRC. In order to prepare the campaign, from April to September 1950, Beijing delivered to the Viet Minh more than 14,000 guns, 1,700 machine guns, about 150 pieces of different types of cannon, 2,800 tons of grain and a large quantity of ammunition, medicine, uniforms and communication equipment. The Border Campaign began on 16 September and ended with a huge Viet Minh victory.

Encouraged by the victory in the Border Campaign, the Viet Minh's military commanders (General Giap in particular), as well as the Chinese advisers, believed that it was the time to lead the war to the Tonkin delta area. From late December to June 1951, the Viet Minh put their emphasis on the delta area, hoping that by conducting a series of victorious offensive campaigns against the French defensive system there, they would create conditions for a total Viet Minh victory on the Indo-China battlefield. However, the Viet Minh's troops suffered heavily from three offensive campaigns in the delta area and finally decided to give up head-on attacks against fortified French positions by mid-1951.

The Viet Minh's strategy experienced an important change in 1952 because during 1952-53 the French turned to a more defensive strategy in the war against the Viet Minh due to their military effectiveness. The French attitude opened up new possibilities to the Vietnamese. On 16 February 1952, Luo Guibo summarized in a report to the Chinese Central Military Commission that it was necessary for the Viet Minh to focus on liberating Sơn La, Lai Châu, and Nghĩa Lộ, all in north-western Vietnam, in 1952, and prepared for seizing north-western Vietnam and upper Laos in 1953, marking the emphasis of Viet Minh shifted from the delta area to upper Laos and north-western Vietnam. There are two reasons for targeting this region in particular: First, the French defenses there were considered to be rather weak and the odds for a Viet Minh victory were good. Second, if the Viet Minh could secure this area under its control, the chanced of an attack from its rear would be very unlikely. The whole plan for the northwest campaign was followed closely in Beijing, and Luo Guibo's strategies were approved by CCP Central Military Commission before the Vietnamese went into action.

From October to December 1952, the Viet Minh's troops successfully conducted the north-west campaign, which resulted in their occupation of Sơn La, Lai Châu, Nghĩa Lộ, and western Yên Bái. From late March to May 1953, the Viet Minh's troops further conducted the Sầm Nưa Campaign in Upper Laos, leading to their control of Sầm Nưa and part of Siang Khoary and Phôngsali. In the fall of 1953, the Vietnamese Workers Party (VWP) leadership realized the potential turning point of the war, and asked the Chinese to provide advice in a cable to the CCP Central Commission on 13 August 1953. On 27 and 29 August, the CCP Central Committee sent two telegrams to Luo Guibo and VWP Central Committee, proposing that the Vietnamese should continue to carry out the 'north-western strategy' and should not shift to the delta area. In late October and early November 1953, Chinese military adviser Wei Guoqing together with Viet Minh commanders worked out the operation plans for 1954 along these lines, which were approved by the VWP Politburo on 3 November, and all of the above formed an important background element for the Diên Biên Phu Campaign.

=== Land reform ===
Land reform had been leading revolutionary objective of the Communist Party since its establishment in 1930. However, in the initial years of the First Indochina War, the VWP's policies on the farm sector were confined to reducing rents and taxes, because it feared that more radical agrarian reform would undermine the unity of the united front against the French by alienating the landowning class. Before getting support from its communist allies, VWP was primarily supported by landowners and prosperous peasants. According to Alex-Thai D. Vo, this initial strategy caused that the party could only push more radical policies in zones that were directly under its military control, such as Thái Nguyên, Tuyên Quang, Phú Thọ, Thanh Hóa, Nghệ An and Hà Tĩnh. Once the CCP began sending advisors and military and financial support across China's southern border, Vietnamese believed that it was the right time to implement full mobilization of the peasants to eliminate the ruling class in the northern Vietnamese countryside.

One of the significant figures in the implementation of Vietnamese land reform was Luo Guibo. He had gained experience of his own while implementing land reform in Jiangxi and Yan'an during the 1930s. This experience qualified him to propose a way for the Vietnamese to mobilize the masses and carry out land reform. On 3 September 1952, Luo first sent his proposal to VWP General Secretary Trường Chinh. On 9 October 1952, Trường Chinh transmitted the proposal to Hồ Chí Minh. The proposal, consisting of six sections, outlined the purposes, requirements, and steps. In terms of the purposes, it suggests that the principal objective of the proposal was to ignite the masses to attack and overthrow landowners, to gain political control of rural areas, to appease the peasants, to increase agricultural production and to build support for the resistance against the French. In order to achieve the goal, it was written from the viewpoint of the Chinese advisors that Vietnamese leadership had to adopt a "firm political stance" and "determined attitude" to overcome its fear that mobilizing the masses would startle and divide the united front and cause the landlord class to retaliate. Besides, to avoid derailment, land reform should include surveying the countryside, propagating the VWP's policies, training cadres, and choosing areas for the implementation of land reform. Two regions—Interzone I and IV—as the VWP's stronghold were specifically recommended to carry out this campaign at first.

Scholars have different opinions on the start time of land reform in the DRV and the attitudes of VWP's leaders towards Luo Guibo's proposal. Alex-Thai D. Vo regards the introduction of the proposal in September and October 1952 making clear the Chinese advisor's significant influence on the development of the methodological structure for the party's campaign of mass mobilization—from inception to fulfillment, and directly revealing Luo's influence on the VWP's preparation for the start of land reform. He implies that the turning point from "drawing the landlords into the resistance" towards an emphasis on "neutralizing some landloards, and expelling imperialist and reactionary feudal large landlords" proposed by Chinese advisors met the demands of VWP for more effective mass mobilization. However, Alec Holcombe disagrees 3 September 1952 as the beginning of the move to land reform because Luo's document does not answer whether his ideas about mass mobilization were received by Hồ Chí Minh and Trường Chinh or not. Moreover, he suspects that Chinh sent Luo's proposal to Hồ wondering whether he would approve the proposal or not. Given the situation that up to that point VWP had implemented many CCP policies in the DRV, including the agricultural tax, thought reform, removal of landlords from mass organizations in the countryside, except land reform. Thus, Alec argus that even in September 1952, Hồ probably still hoped to follow Lenin's classic two-stage formula of expelling the imperial power first and carrying out major socialist transformation subsequently. He believes it was Hồ's meeting with Stalin in October that marked the beginning of the DRV's campaign of mass mobilization through land reform. Besides, unlike Vo's opinions of the voluntary attitudes of VWP's leaders towards this change, Alec prefers the "three-stage strategy" was implemented under the pressure from Stalin and Mao. By comparing the original version read at the Second Congress in February 1951 and the edited one in 1952, Alec pointed out that the changing rhetoric about land reform is an illustration of the strategic change, but only after seeing that he could no longer refuse Stalin and Mao did Hồ Chí Minh decide to carry out land reform.

=== Thought reform ===
According to the memoir of Wen Zhuang who served as the head of the translation team of the CCP advisory group to Vietnam and Secretary of the Chinese Embassy in Vietnam during 1949 to 1967, Luo Guibo not only deeply participated in the land reform but also the VWP's thought reform in 1953. However, the records about his role in thought reform found in Chinese sources are hardly met in English sources.

The first communist party of Vietnam was founded at the beginning of 1930, taking the name of the Communist Party of Indochina, asserting its right to the whole of the territories of French Indochina (Tonkin, Annam, Cochinchina, Laos, Cambodia). However, the great majority of its member were Vietnamese. According to Jean Chesneaux, there was a fundamental political problem since the party was founded. The "Indochina" choice implied—even though the party was in fact Vietnamese—that it was adopting an anti-imperialist strategy while at the same time beginning to adopt much the same attitude as the adversary it was about to fight, namely the French colonial power. On the other hand, the "Vietnam" choice meant giving priority to Vietnamese national unity, and narrowly tying down the revolutionary struggle for socialism and the national renaissance of Vietnam. The "Indochina" trend was tightly linked with the preponderant role played by the Comintern in the life of Vietnamese communism during this whole period (1930–41) by the intermediary of the French Communist Party.

Since 1941, with the foundation of the Viet Minh, and especially since 1944, with the formation of the first military liberation detachments, Vietnamese communism has undergone the same fundamental change as Chinese communism has undergone the same fundamental change as Chinese communism since 1927: the military struggle came into the forefront. By the end of 1946, the Viet Minh were forced out of Hanoi and back into the underground by constant French encroachments on their prerogatives and zone of control. As vicious battles broke out in the city, the DRV became a government in exile, with Hồ continuing to serve as president of the Council of Ministers, attempting to negotiate peace with foreign heads of state and retaining control of government power within the broader Viet Minh alliance. The year of 1951 was a turning point for Vietnamese communism as the party was re-established under the title of Workers Party of Vietnam at the Second Party Congress. Given the DRV's diplomatic isolation and the CCP's presence on Vietnam's northern border after their 1949 victory, those communists most closely allied with China became the dominant force in the DRV. By the Second Party Congress in February 1951, the number of party members had reached 766,349.

The foundation of Vietnamese Worker's Party (VWP) was supported by CCP leaders. Luo Guibo was appointed as representative to give a speech at the Second Party Congress. Furthermore, Luo played a role in the thought reform in 1953. He suggested that the VWP be reorganized in stages by means of training at party schools at all levels: first, all senior cadres would be trained through the Central Party School (Zhongyang Dangxiao), and then in each war zone and province. The aim was equipped the party cadres with proletarian ideas in order to overcome petty-capitalist ideas, and to uphold the belief that the war would be won in the long run. Based on the method of training and cultivation of the CCP introduced by Luo Guibo, the Central Committee of the VWP carried out a comprehensive party reorganization campaign. The cadres were educated through listening to reports, studying documents, conducting criticism and self-assessment. During this period, Luo Guibo was also invited to give lectures at the Central Party School. According to Wen Zhuang, this reorganization and education laid the ideological foundation for the VWP and raised the awareness of the cadres to be united in the struggle for victory.

Government offices
Preceded by Wang Qian	Governor of Shanxi; 1979–1983	Succeeded by Wang Senhao
Unknown	Vice-Minister of Foreign Affairs; 1957–1970	Unknown
Diplomatic posts
New office	The head of the Chinese Political Advisory Group to the Democratic Republic of Vietnam (DRV); 1951-1954	
