= Sun Wensheng =

Chinese politician

Sun Wensheng (born 1942) is a People's Republic of China politician. He was born in Weihai, Shandong. He was vice governor and governor of Shanxi from 1994 to 1998.

Preceded by Hu Fuguo	Governor of Shanxi; 1993–1999	Succeeded by Liu Zhenhua
Preceded by Tian Fengshan	Minister of Land and Resources; 2003–2007	Succeeded by Xu Shaoshi
