= 2005 Sunjiawan mine disaster =

Gas explosion in Fuxin, China

The Sunjiawan mine disaster (Chinese: 孙家湾矿难) was a mine disaster that occurred on 14 February 2005 in Fuxin city, Liaoning province, in the northeastern part of the People's Republic of China. Initial reports indicated that at least 214 coal miners were killed, making it the worst mining disaster in China in at least 15 years.

The disaster was a gas explosion that occurred about 3:50 p.m. local time at the Sunjiawan colliery of the Fuxin Coal Industry Group in the city of Fuxin, about 242m (794 feet) underground. Twenty-two people were injured. The explosion reportedly occurred about ten minutes after an earthquake shook the mine.

== Aftermath ==
Following the disaster, the incident was officially classified as a major accident resulting from negligence. Liang Jinfa, Chairman and General Manager of the Fuxin Mining Company, was dismissed from his post and stripped of his Party membership, Of the 31 other individuals deemed responsible for the accident, four were sent to judicial authorities, while 27 received administrative sanctions. Additionally, Liu Guoqiang, Vice Governor of Liaoning Province, was issued a major demerit.

The families of the 214 deceased miners signed an agreement with the mining company and received compensation of 200,000 yuan.

Following the disaster, Chinese authorities dispatched an additional 21 inspection teams to conduct safety inspections across 20 major coal-producing provinces and 45 state-owned coal mines throughout China between February 23 and March 10 of 2005.

== See also ==
- Coal power in China
- List of explosions
