= Minister of Natural Resources (China) =

Minister of the People's Republic of China

Minister of Natural Resources of the People's Republic of China
- 中华人民共和国自然资源部部长
- National Emblem of China

- Flag of China
- Incumbent; Vacant since 30 May 2026
- Ministry of Natural Resources
- Status: Provincial and ministerial-level official
- Member of: Plenary Meeting of the State Council
- Seat: Ministry of Natural Resources Building, Xicheng District, Beijing
- Nominator: Premier (chosen within the Chinese Communist Party)
- Appointer: President with the confirmation of the National People's Congress or its Standing Committee
- Formation: March 1998; 28 years ago
- First holder: Zhou Yongkang
- Deputy: Vice Minister of Natural Resources

The minister of natural resources of the People's Republic of China is the head of the Ministry of Natural Resources of the People's Republic of China and a member of the State Council. Within the State Council, the position is fourteenth in order of precedence. The minister is responsible for leading the ministry, presiding over its meetings, and signing important documents related to the ministry. Officially, the minister is nominated by the premier of the State Council, who is then approved by the National People's Congress or its Standing Committee and appointed by the president.

The current minister is Guan Zhi'ou, who concurrently serves as the Chinese Communist Party Committee Secretary of the ministry.

== List of ministers ==
=== Minister of Land and Resources ===
No.	Name	Took office	Left office	Notes	Ref.
1	Zhou Yongkang	March 1998	December 1999	Later Politburo Standing Committee (2007–2012) Later investigated for corruption	
2	Tian Fengshan	December 1999	October 2003	Convicted of corruption and sentenced to prison	
3	Sun Wensheng	October 2003	April 2007		
4	Xu Shaoshi	April 2007	16 March 2013	Later Director of the National Development and Reform Commission	
5	Jiang Daming	16 March 2013	19 March 2018		

=== Minister of Natural Resources ===
No.	Name	Took office	Left office	Ref.
1	Lu Hao	19 March 2018	24 June 2022	
2	Wang Guanghua	24 June 2022	25 December 2024	
3	Guan Zhi'ou	25 December 2024	30 May 2026	
