= Inner Mongolia Agricultural University =

Agricultural school in Hohhot, China

- 内蒙古农业大学 ᠥᠪᠥᠷ ᠮᠣᠩᠭᠣᠯ ‍ᠤᠨ ᠲᠠᠶᠢᠶᠠᠯᠠᠩ ‍ᠤᠨ ᠶᠡᠬᠡ ᠰᠤᠷᠭᠠᠭᠤᠯᠢ
- Former names: Inner Mongolia Institute of Agriculture and Animal Husbandry
- Motto: solidarity factualism erudition innovation
- Type: Public university
- Established: 1952; 74 years ago
- Affiliations: Inner Mongolia Autonomous Region and State Forestry Administration
- President: 王万义 Wang Wanyi
- Academic staff: 2,737
- Students: 33,873 (2014)
- Postgraduates: 2,273 (2014 including doctoral)
- Location: Huhhot, Inner Mongolia Autonomous Region, China
- Campus: Urban
- Nickname: 内农大
- Website: www.imau.edu.cn

Chinese name
- Traditional Chinese: 內蒙古農業大學
- Simplified Chinese: 内蒙古农业大学
Transcriptions
Standard Mandarin
- Hanyu Pinyin: Nèiměnggǔ nóngyè Dàxué

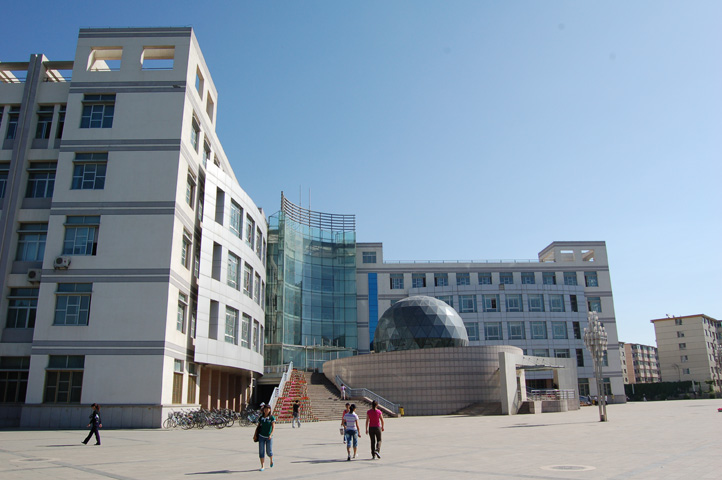
IMAU campus library

Inner Mongolia Agricultural University (IMAU, Chinese: 内蒙古农业大学, Mongolian: ᠥᠪᠥᠷ ᠮᠣᠩᠭᠣᠯ ᠤᠨ ᠲᠠᠶᠢᠶᠠᠯᠠᠩ ᠤᠨ ᠶᠡᠬᠡ ᠰᠤᠷᠭᠠᠭᠤᠯᠢ) is a university in Hohhot, Inner Mongolia, China under the authority of the Autonomous Region government. It is in Hohhot, the capital city of Inner Mongolia Autonomous Region. It was established in 1952. There are over 100 undergraduate degree programs and postgraduate courses across a range of disciplines, including Agricultural, Engineering, Science, Art, Business, and Management.

== History ==
IMAU was established in 1952, with the first president appointed by Chairman Mao Zedong.

== Faculty ==
IMAU has a staff of 2,737, among whom 435 have doctoral degrees and 653 have master's degrees, 101 tutors of doctoral students. IMAU has one professorship from the Yangtze River Scholar Award Plan.

== Campuses ==
There are three campuses — main campus in Hohhot, Salaqi branch campus, and Current Science Park. The campuses cover an area of 15,000 hectares, of which 10,000 acres are for teaching and researching. There are four school-standard stadiums. Library construction area is 3,000 square meters. The value of teaching instrument and equipment amounted to 412 million RMB.

== Academics ==
Over the past 63 years, IMAU has initiated a multi-level management system. Its primary objective is focused on undergraduate studies. IMAU has been paying profound attention to postgraduate, higher vocational and adult educational programs.

IMAU is a multi-discipline university with eight fields of study: Agronomy, Science, Engineering, Economics, Management, Social Sciences and Education. IMAU has succeeded in cultivating more than 70,000 skilled talents in diverse fields of study.

=== Academic organisations ===
IMAU has 19 colleges including the College of Animal Science and Medicine, a Department for Physical Education and an Advanced Educational Research Center, two ministry-level key laboratories, one key laboratory of the State Bureau of Forestry, seven regional key laboratories, one state-level open field observation station, three regional engineering technology research centers, and one engineering research center supported by the Ministry of Education.

=== Academic departments (colleges) ===
- College of Water Resources and Civil Engineering
- College of Animal Science
- College of Veterinary
- College of Agronomy
- College of Forestry
- College of Ecology and Environmental Science
- College of Mechanical and Electrical Engineering
- College of Economics and Management
- College of Food Science and Engineering
- College of Life Science
- College of Material Science and Art Design
- College of Humanity and Social Science
- College of Foreign Languages
- College of Science
- College of Computer Science and Information Engineering
- College of Energy and Transportation Engineering
- College of International Education
- College of Vocational Technology
- College of Continuing Education

=== Discipline ===
There is one state-level key discipline, one key discipline of the Ministry of Agriculture, three key disciplines of the State Forestry Administration and 22 regional key disciplines. IMAU has six first-level and 33 second-level disciplines, which are authorized to grant doctorate degrees. IMAU has established three moving scientific research stations for post-doctorate research. It has 72 second-level disciplines that confer master degrees.

IMAU offers 58 undergraduate programs, 13 of which are offered in Mongolian and Chinese.

=== Bilingual (Chinese and English) undergraduate programs ===
- Water Resources Engineering
- Practaculture Science
- Vehicle Engineering
- Animal Quarantine
- Horticulture
- Computer Science and Technology
- Software Engineering
- Computer Network Engineering
- Finance
- Agronomy
- Law
- Economic Management for Agricultural and Forestry
- Food Science and Engineering
- Biotechnology
- Bioscience
- Furniture Design and International Trade
- Wood Science and Engineering
- Landscape Architecture

=== Achievement ===
IMAU has attained scientific-research achievements in 265 programs and won provincial "Technological Advancement" awards in 18 programs, seven of them first-class awards. These have provided extensive technological support and service for economic construction, ecology and natural-forest protection, reforesting cultivated land, prohibiting herding and encouraging yard-feeding - among other developments - in the Inner Mongolia Autonomous Region.

The government of the Inner Mongolia Autonomous Region once awarded "Excellent collectivity that had made great contribution in developing our region through technological education" to IMAU.

== International exchange and cooperation ==
IMAU has established broad academic ties with some 20 universities in United States, Canada, UK, France, Australia, Japan, Russia, the Republic of Mongolia, among others. IMAU has collaborative programs with foreign educational institutions. Outstanding achievements have been made in teaching, scientific research, cultural exchange and joint programs.
