= Li Wenxi =

Chinese politician

- 李文喜

Vice Chairman of the Liaoning Provincial Committee of the Chinese People's Political Consultative Conference
- In office January 2008 – January 2013
- Chairman: Luo Lin

Head of Liaoning Provincial Public Security Department
- In office May 2002 – March 2011
- Governor: Bo Xilai
- Preceded by: Li Feng
- Succeeded by: Xue Heng

Personal details
- Born: March 1950 (age 76) Benxi County, Liaoning, China
- Party: Chinese Communist Party (1972–2021; expelled)
- Education: Graduate School of Chinese Academy of Social Sciences

Li Wenxi (Chinese: 李文喜; pinyin: Lǐ Wénxǐ; born March 1950) is a retired Chinese politician who spent his entire career in his home-province Liaoning. As of January 2021 he was under investigation by China's top anti-corruption agency. He has retired for eight years, prior to that, he served as vice chairman of the Liaoning Provincial Committee of the Chinese People's Political Consultative Conference from 2008 to 2013 and head of Liaoning Provincial Public Security Department from 2002 to 2011. He is the first leader of provincial-ministerial level to be targeted by China's top anticorruption watchdog in 2021.

== Career ==
Li was born in Benxi County, Liaoning, in March 1950. He entered the workforce in June 1969, and joined the Chinese Communist Party in May 1972.

In February 1990 he became deputy magistrate of Benxi County. In November 1992 he became the deputy head of Benxi Municipal Public Security Bureau, rising to head and party chief in April 1994. He concurrently served as vice mayor in May 1996.

In January 2000 he was transferred to Shenyang, capital of Liaoning province, and appointed deputy head and deputy party chief of Liaoning Provincial Public Security Department. Two years later, he was elevated to head and party chief. He held the head position for almost nine years. In January 2008 he concurrently served as vice chairman of the Liaoning Provincial Committee of the Chinese People's Political Consultative Conference. He retired in January 2013.

== Downfall ==
On January 25, 2021, he was put under investigation for alleged "serious violations of discipline and laws" by the Central Commission for Discipline Inspection (CCDI), the party's internal disciplinary body, and the National Supervisory Commission, the highest anti-corruption agency of China.

His younger brother, Li Wen'an (李文安), once demanded a local entrepreneur Yuan Chengjia (袁诚家) for the mining right of a mineral resources.

Before he stepped down, his subordinates, Wang Like (deputy head of Liaoning Provincial Public Security Department), Bai Yuexian (白月先; deputy head of Liaoning Provincial Public Security Department), and Zhang Dewei (张德威; chief of Food and Drug Crime Investigation Team), were caught up in Xi Jinping's anti-graft campaign in 2020.

On 26 July 2021, he was expelled from the Communist Party and his retirement benefits was abolished. Li's illegal gains will be confiscated and his case transferred to the judiciary.

On 6 January 2023, Li was sentenced to death with a two-year reprieve by the Tai'an Intermediate People's Court for taking bribes exceeding 540 million yuan, his political rights for life was revoked and the confiscation of all his property was ordered. After the reprieve, Li's sentence will be commuted to life in prison without parole. The ill-gotten gains will be confiscated and handed over to the state treasury.

Government offices
Preceded by Li Feng	Head of Liaoning Provincial Public Security Department; 2006–2011	Succeeded by Xue Heng
