= Shenyang Agricultural University =

Agricultural school in Shenyang, China

Shenyang Agricultural University (Chinese: 沈阳农业大学; pinyin: Shěnyáng Nóngyè Dàxué) is a university in Shenyang, Liaoning, China under the provincial government.
