= Dongbei University of Finance and Economics Press =

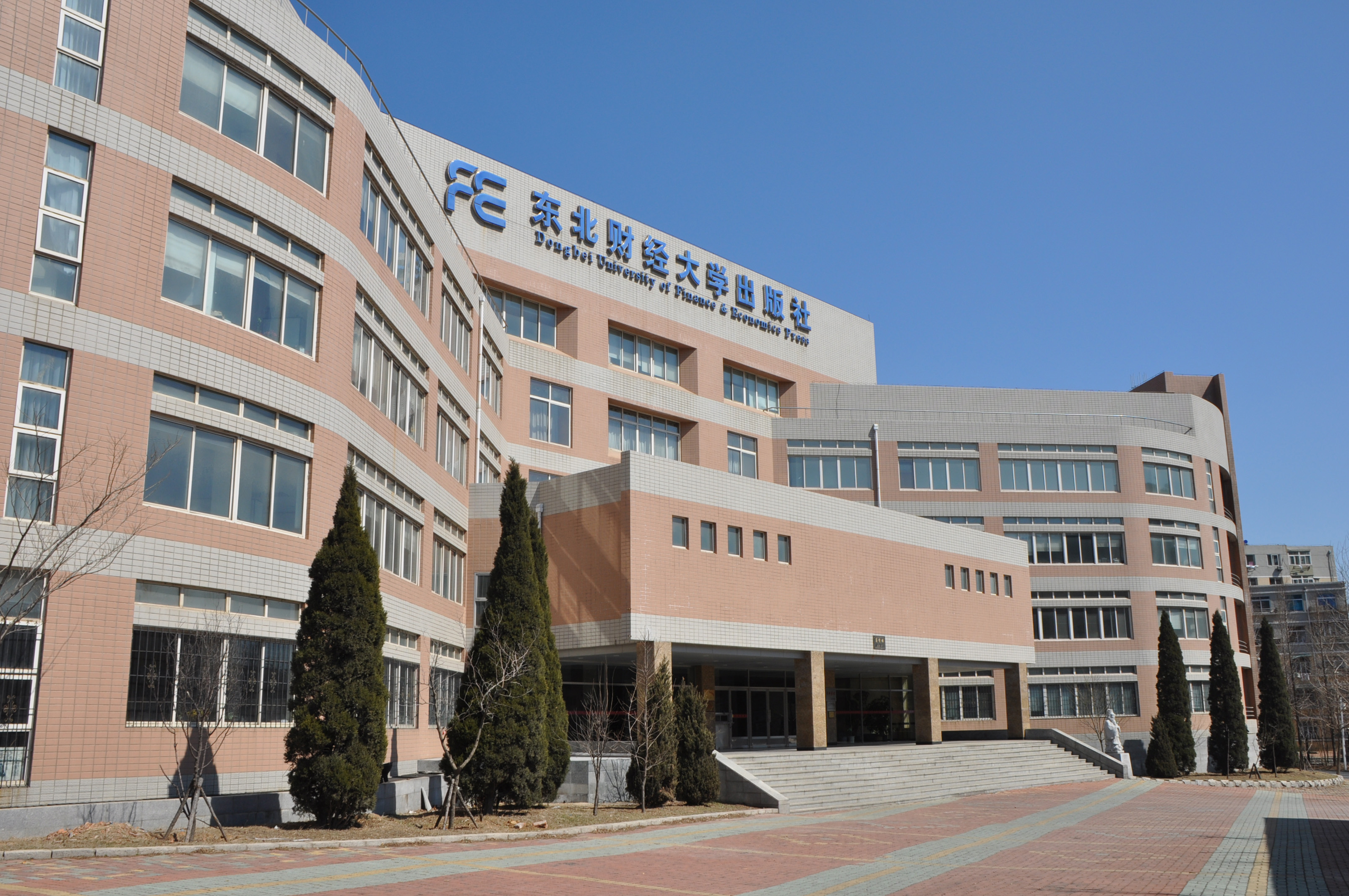
Dongbei University of Finance and Economics Press

Dongbei University of Finance and Economics Press (DUFEP; Chinese: 东北财经大学出版社; Dongbei means Northeast) is a university press owned by Dongbei University of Finance and Economics, located in Dalian, Liaoning Province, Northeast China.

== General Information ==
- Established: 1985
- President: Fang Hongxing
- Address: No. 217 Jianjie, Heishijiao, Dalian City, Liaoning Province

== Published books ==
DUFEP publishes various books.

- Books Published by DUFEP (amazon.com)

== See also ==
- Dongbei University of Finance and Economics
