= Hu Zhiqiang (politician, born 1963) =

Chinese politician

- 胡志强

Party Branch Secretary of Shaanxi Provincial Health and Family Planning Commission
- In office April 2017 – June 2018

Chairman of the Standing Committee of Yulin People's Congress
- In office January 2012 – April 2017

Communist Party Secretary of Yulin
- In office July 2011 – April 2017
- Preceded by: Li Jinzhu
- Succeeded by: Dai Zhengshe

Mayor of Yulin
- In office February 2008 – July 2011
- Preceded by: Li Jinzhu
- Succeeded by: Lu Zhiyuan

Personal details
- Born: September 1963 (age 63) Danzhu Town, Zhangzi County, Shanxi, China
- Party: Chinese Communist Party (1985–2018; expelled)
- Relations: Hu Wenqiang (brother)
- Parent(s): Hu Fuguo (father); Chang Genxiu (mother)
- Education: Beijing College Finance and Commerce; Central Party School of the Chinese Communist Party; Cheung Kong Graduate School of Business

Chinese name
- Traditional Chinese: 胡志強
- Simplified Chinese: 胡志强
Transcriptions
Standard Mandarin
- Hanyu Pinyin: Hú Zhìqiáng

Hu Zhiqiang (Chinese: 胡志强; born September 1963) is a former Chinese politician who spent most of his career in northwest China's Shaanxi province. He was investigated by the Chinese Communist Party's anti-graft agency in June 2018. Previously he served as Party Branch Secretary of Shaanxi Provincial Health and Family Planning Commission. He was a delegate to the 18th National Congress of the Chinese Communist Party.

Hu is the son of Hu Fuguo, who served as party chief, governor and CPPCC Committee chairman in Shanxi province.

== Early life and education ==
Hu was born in Danzhu Town of Zhangzi County, Shanxi in September 1963. His father Hu Fuguo (born 1937) is a retired politician who served as Chinese Communist Party Committee Secretary, governor and CPPCC Committee chairman of Shanxi in the 1990s. He has a younger brother named Hu Wenqiang (胡文强). Resumption of University Entrance Examination in 1984, he was accepted to the Beijing College Finance and Commerce, majoring in industrial and commercial administration. He also studied at the Central Party School of the Chinese Communist Party and Cheung Kong Graduate School of Business as a part-time student.

== Career ==
After graduating in September 1988 he was assigned to the State Administration for Industry and Commerce as an official. In March 1993 he was transferred to Lüliang and appointed deputy director of Huajin Coking Coal Co., Ltd, a state-owned coal mining company. He concurrently served as deputy magistrate of Mouping County between May 1994 and May 1995.

In April 1996 he was transferred back to Beijing, where he worked at Shenhua Group, a leading state-owned mining and energy company and the largest coal-producing company in China.

Depending on the relationship, Hu was transferred again to Xianyang, Shaanxi in November 2001, and served as vice-mayor and deputy party chief there.

He was deputy secretary-general of Shaanxi Provincial Government in November 2005, and held that office until February 2008.

In February 2008 he became the deputy party chief of Yulin, rising to communist party secretary in July 2011. During his tenure, he purchased offices and sold offices, making a marked price for county secretaries and county magistrates. In April 2017, he was appointed Party Branch Secretary of Shaanxi Provincial Health and Family Planning Commission, he remained in that position until June 2018, when he was placed under investigation by the Communist Party's anti-corruption agency.

== Downfall ==
On June 12, 2018, he was put under investigation for alleged "serious violations of discipline and laws" by the Central Commission for Discipline Inspection (CCDI), the party's internal disciplinary body, and the National Supervisory Commission, the highest anti-corruption agency of China. On December 13, he was expelled from the Chinese Communist Party (CCP) and dismissed from public office. He was detained on December 24.

On February 12, 2019, he was indicted on suspicion of accepting bribes. On August 20, he stood trial at the Xi'an Intermediate People's court on charges of taking bribes. He was accused of taking advantage of the various positions he formerly held in Shaanxi to seek benefits for others certain organizations and individuals in project approval, project contracting, enterprise operation and job adjustment through himself, his wife and relatives.

Government offices
Preceded by Li Jinzhu	Mayor of Yulin; 2008–2011	Succeeded by Lu Zhiyuan (陆治原)
Party political offices
Preceded by Li Jinzhu	Communist Party Secretary of Yulin; 2011–2017	Succeeded by Dai Zhengshe (戴征社)
