= DUFE—Surrey International Institute =

Surrey International Institute
- 东北财经大学萨里国际学院
- Type: Private
- Established: 2007
- Students: 1,500
- Location: Dalian, China
- Website: www.surrey.dufe.edu.cn

The Surrey international Institute (Chinese: 东北财经大学萨里国际学院) is an academic partnership between the Dongbei University of Finance and Economics (DUFE) in Dalian, and the University of Surrey in the United Kingdom. The University of Surrey, Guildford, is one of the UK's leading research universities. It has over 16,000 students on its campus at Guildford and one substantial offshore presence in China, the Surrey International Institute (SII). This was established in 2006 as an academic joint venture with Dongbei University of Finance and Economics (DUFE), one of China's leading universities, which has over 12,500 undergraduate and postgraduate students and in based in Dalian in Liaoning Province of China.

SII-DUFE is the first joint venture agreement between Surrey and a Chinese university. It offers international study programmes exploiting the expertise of the two universities in subjects aligned with Business Management and Tourism Management. Students from both the UK and China have the opportunity to spend part of their course at both Surrey and DUFE. For their first two years all students study at DUFE on a mutually agreed syllabus; thereafter for Years 3 and 4 they either move to the premises of Surrey International Institute on the DUFE campus or can apply to take up a limited number of places (currently 64) in Guildford. For these last two years the programmes are wholly under the auspices of Surrey. There are currently around 1,500 students studying at SII.

== History ==
The institute was established on August 30, 2007 by order of the Ministry of Education's formal document No. 200769.

One key feature of the international strategy of the University of Surrey is to focus on building academic networks and partnerships. The wording of the strategy declares one of its three key aims as being, 'to give the university substantial international reach through strategic partnerships with quality institutions'. It has therefore established global partnership agreements with a small group of leading universities throughout the world.

The President of DUFE Professor Ai Hongde and the Vice-Chancellor of Surrey, Professor Christopher Snowden officially launched the institute, based on China's Ministry of Education (MOE) approval. Intake started in September 2007, when SII offered three programmes (MSc in International Business Management, MSc in Tourism Management and MSc in Information Systems).

== Context ==
A number of British Universities have set up satellite campuses and joint ventures in China, including the University of Nottingham Ningbo China (UNNC) University of Nottingham Ningbo, China, which is an overseas campus of the University of Nottingham, situated in the city of Ningbo in the coastal province of Zhejiang. Xi'an Jiaotong-Liverpool University is an independent university based in Suzhou, China, resulting from a partnership between the University of Liverpool and Xi'an Jiaotong University.

In 2010–11, China was the third most popular destination for UK TNE students, after Malaysia and Singapore: and there are almost 36,000 UK TNE students in China. As a highly trusted expert in international higher education quality assurance, QAA is determined to protect the interests of all students working towards a UK HE qualification - wherever in the world they are studying.

American Universities have also sought a presence in China. New York University Shanghai (NYU Shanghai) is the third degree-granting campus established by New York University, after New York City and Abu Dhabi, in partnership with East China Normal University of Shanghai.

However, such strategies have proven controversial. A 2007 report entitled 'British Universities in China: The Reality Beyond the Rhetoric - An Agora Discussion Paper' (a British think-tank for higher education), Edited by Anna Fazackerley, cautioned British universities that they must acquire a more thorough understanding of Chinese higher education policy if they were to succeed in building successful strategic alliances over the long-term.

Whilst the University of Nottingham and the University of Liverpool campuses are independent legal entities, SII is an academic partnership institution between University of Surrey and Dongbei University of Finance and Economics (DUFE) in Dalian, China. Developed at a faculty level; the link with DUFE, which is based in Surrey University's Faculty of Management and Law, is one of the most long-established and successful of these faculty-based ventures.

== Organization ==
The nature of Surrey International Institute (SII) is a joint venture agreement between Surrey and DUFE. Governance structure comprises a joint management committee (JMC) that oversees the operation run by its appointed executive group (EG).

The vice-chancellor of University of Surrey leads Surrey's JMC team. A Surrey senior member of staff is appointed by the JMC as the chair of executive Group in charge of the operation of the joint venture. The current operational manager is Dr. Gary Rivers (associate dean) and is resident in SII to ensure teaching supervision, teaching activities and teaching quality.

The dean of SII is Professor Zhao Yanzhi, Professor of Finance, Dongbei University of Finance and Economics, China. Yanzhi Zhao is professor of finance at Dongbei University of Finance and Economics (DUFE), Dalian, China. He has served as dean of Surrey International Institute and director of Global Institute of Management and Economics at DUFE. Prior to that, he studied at Dalian University of Technology of Mechanical Engineering and DUFE, completing a PhD in quantitative economics at DUFE. In a 2012, presentation for the British Council,

Surrey International Institute is not a legal entity, but is technically a joint venture between the two institutions, with a joint management structure comprising a joint management committee in Dalian, chaired by the chairman of DUFE and a joint executive group in Surrey, chaired three times annually by the pro-vice-chancellor (international relations) from Surrey. The pro-vice-chancellor is also a member of the Dalian joint management committee. The creation of the joint venture required the approval of the Chinese Ministry of Education.

The parties recover their full teaching costs from student fees which vary according to location of study. However, those students who return to Surrey to complete their degrees will be paying the usual international tuition fee. Another key objective is to build up the partnership with DUFE so that in the long term both institutions will be undertaking a wide range of joint activities including joint research.

Students registered on the BSc Management programme at SII (which is a four-year programme) follow a similar curriculum to students at Surrey in the UK. They are taught by lecturers based at SII as well as academics from the UK Surrey tourism team.

== Statistics ==
The BSc and MSc in Tourism Management, Business Management, Information Management and Information Systems are accredited by AACSB. The Dual Degrees is awarded by both parties. SII achieved top level in the MoE audit review in China-Foreign Cooperation Running Schools in Year 2011. It was awarded the Best Joint Venture in Liaoning Province award by the Liaoning Education Board.,

SII has currently employs 62 full-time teachers, including seven University of Surrey staff. From those, there are 45 foreign teachers 45; 17 local teachers, and all have a background of studying abroad. There are 36 professional teachers; and 26 language teachers. 86% of professional teachers have doctoral teachers. They graduated from universities including University of Cambridge, University of London, London School of Economics, the University of Manchester, University of California, Berkeley, Pennsylvania State University, Washington State University and Sydney University and other international universities.

In 2012, the UK Quality Assurance Agency for Higher Education (QAA) undertook its second review of higher education delivered in mainland China, carried out from 26 November to 7 December 2012 by a QAA team comprising four members of staff and five peer reviewers.

The TNE China 2012 review was centred on a series of desk-based studies looking at institutional procedures for the management of academic quality and standards and the way they operated. It is envisaged that these studies will cover a large proportion of the UK higher education institutions' activity in mainland China.
