= Dongbei University of Finance and Economics =

University in Dalian, Liaoning Province, China

- 东北财经大学
- Former names: Dongbei Institute of Finance and Economics, Liaoning Institute of Finance and Economics
- Motto: 博学济世
- Motto in English: Broaden Intellectual Horizon and Contribute to Social Well-being
- Type: Public
- Established: October 1952; 74 years ago
- President: Prof. Wang Xuhui (汪旭晖)
- Party Secretary: Prof. Fang Hongxing (方红星)
- Students: Over 17,000
- Location: Dalian, Liaoning, China
- Campus: Urban, 0.65 km^{2}
- Website: www.dufe.edu.cn

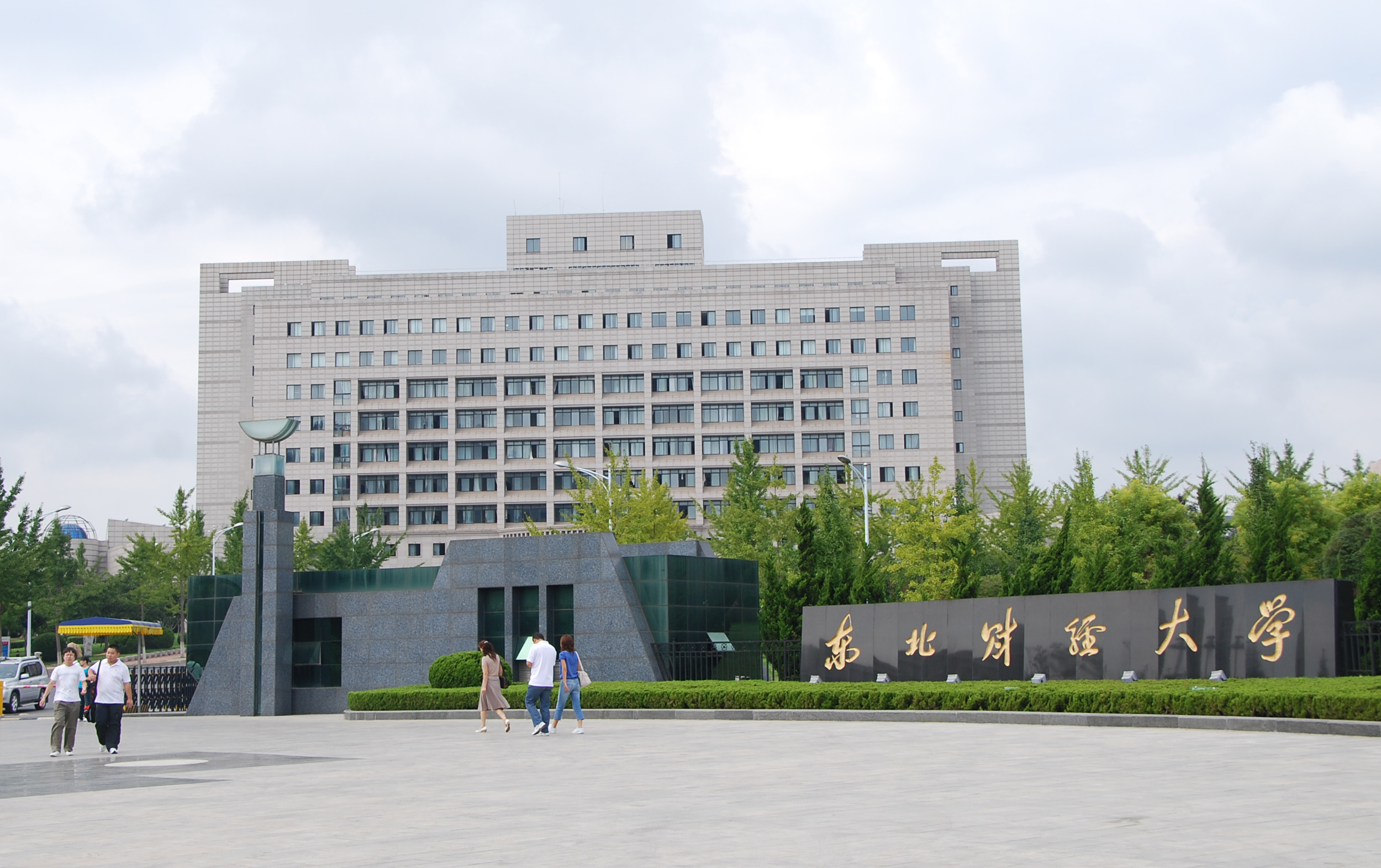
Entrance to Dongbei University of Finance and Economy

The Dongbei University of Finance and Economics (DUFE; 东北财经大学) is a provincial public university in Dalian, Liaoning, China. Home to over 17,000 students, it is one of the oldest and largest modern universities in Dalian.

DUFE is a multidisciplinary, teaching-and-research-oriented university focused on economics, management, law, arts, and science. It offers full- and part-time education programs.

For full-time programs, DUFE offers three first-level mobile stations for post-doctoral research—applied economics, theoretical economics and business administration; 48 PhD programs, 80 master's degree programs, including MBA, MPA, MPAcc, J.M., etc. and 43 undergraduate programs. In all the disciplines, there are three key state-sponsored disciplines: industrial economics, public finance (including taxation) and accounting; one key state-supported discipline: quantitative economics; and twenty-five undergraduate majors listed in state-level first-class construction program: accounting, finance, business administration, statistics, etc.

== Major schools and departments ==
- School of Public Finance and Taxation
- Center for Industrial and Business Organization
- Institute for Northeast Full Revitalization
- School of Law
- School of Business Administration (MBA Education Center)
- School of Public Administration
- School of Management Science and Engineering (SMSE)
- College of International Economics & Trade
- School of International Business Communications
- International Business College
- Institute for Advanced Economic Research
- School of International Education (International Students Office)
- School of Finance
- School of Economics
- School of FinTech
- School of Accounting
- School of Marxism
- College of Humanities and Communication
- DUFE—Surrey International Institute
- School of Data Science and Artificial Intelligence
- School of Statistics
- School of Investment & Construction Management
- Institute of Supply Chain Analytics
- Graduate School
- Department of Physical Education
- School of Continuing Education
- School of Distance Learning
- School of International Studies
- School of Innovation and Entrepreneurship

== Admissions ==
DUFE's students are from all 31 provinces in China, as well as international students from more than 30 countries. As one of the most competitive schools, DUFE's average China National College Entrance Exams grades are consistently among the top three in Liaoning province. The graduate employment rates are also one of the highest (over 95%).

== International cooperation/programs ==
DUFE's International Education Center facilitates students' studies from international perspectives. Its participants at home are afforded the access to international perspectives. The international cooperation programs have grown to include 13 exchange programs with nine universities in six countries (the UK, Germany, Korea, Japan, Canada, Australia, Ireland and Austria). Some of the joint programs are:

- DUFE—Curtin University: 3+1 years Bachelors' program in Accounting
- DUFE—Ulster University: 4+0 years Bachelors' program in Accounting
- DUFE—Ulster University: 4+0 years Bachelors' program in Finance
- DUFE—University of Western Ontario (King's University College): 2+2 years Bachelors' program in Economics
- DUFE—Surrey International Institute offers masters and undergraduate exchange programs with University of Surrey, UK

== Athletic programs ==
DUFE prides itself on student athletes and collegiate sports. It is one of the national bases for collegiate sports development.

The men's soccer team has won four consecutive championships of China's collegiate men's soccer champions tournament — one-time champions and twice runners-up of "Phillips Cup" of China's men's soccer collegiate champions league, and Championship of Asia-Pacific University Men's soccer invitational. DUFE's men's basketball team had a strong force in the China University Basketball Association (CUBA), having won many city and provincial championships and third place in the national finals. DUFE's field and track team has been in overall second place Asia University Track and Field's Invitational, first place in the 9th China National University Field and Tracks Games.

DUFE's graduates include athletes and coaches of Olympic gold medalists, world champions/record holders, and many national champions.

== Rankings and reputation ==
DUFE is one of the top schools in the field in China, with its graduates occupying high-level positions in government and industries, especially in banking and finance sectors. It has a significant position throughout the northeast and across the country. As of 2022, Dongbei University of Finance & Economics ranked # 1 in Northeast China region and # 6 nationwide among universities specialized in finance, business, and economics in the Best Chinese Universities Ranking. Dongbei University of Finance & Economics ranked amongst the top # 400 universities in the world for "Management" and "Hospitality & Tourism Management".

== Notable alumni ==
- Chen Zhenggao: Governor, Liaoning Province
- Dong Dasheng: Deputy Director, National Audit Bureau
- Li Wancai: Mayor of Dalian
- Zheng Zhijie: President, China National Development Bank
- Liu Kegu: Vice President, China National Development Bank
- Lu Xin: Deputy Minister, Ministry of Education of China
- Ma Yongwei: Former Chairman, China Insurance Regulatory Commission
- Meng Jianmin: Deputy Director, State Assets Supervision and Administration Commission
- Tang Shuangnin: Chairman, China Everbright Banking Group
- Wang Hongzhang: Chairman, China Construction Banking Group
- Wang Wenyuan: Former Vice Chairman, Chinese People's Political Consultative Conference
- Wang Xianzhang: Chairman, China Insurance Society, Former Chairman/CEO, China Life Insurance Group
- Xia Deren: Deputy Party Secretary, Liaoning Province (Former President of Dongbei University of Finance & Economics and Mayor of Dalian)
- Xie Xuezhi: Deputy Director, National Tax Authority
- Yao Zhongmin: Vice President, China National Development Bank
- Zhou Yanli: Vice Chairman, China Insurance Regulatory Commission
- Zhuang Xinyi: Vice Chairman, China Securities Regulatory Commission
- Ma Yongwei, banker and politician

== See also ==
- Dongbei University of Finance and Economics Press
