= Liaoning Provincial Federation of Trade Unions =

Authority for trade unions in Liaoning, China

The Liaoning Provincial Federation of Trade Unions (Chinese: 辽宁省总工会) is the provincial branch of the All-China Federation of Trade Unions.

== History ==
Established in August 1954, the Liaoning Provincial Federation of Trade Unions serves as the principal authority for trade union groups in Liaoning Province. Its responsibilities encompass establishing a robust basis at the grassroots level, enhancing rights protection services, and developing a functional system to support workers. On December 9–16, 1963, the Second Congress was held in Shenyang.
