= Liaoning Technical University =

University in Liaoning, China

- 辽宁工程技术大学
- Motto: 誠樸求是博學篤行
- Motto in English: Honest and knowledgeable
- Type: Public
- Established: 1949
- President: Pan Yishan
- Faculty: 2,159
- Undergraduates: 25,000
- Location: Fuxin, Liaoning, China; Huludao, Liaoning, China
- Campus: Urban
- Website: www.lntu.edu.cn

Liaoning Technical University (LNTU, also Liaoning University of Engineering and Technology; simplified Chinese: 辽宁工程技术大学; traditional Chinese: 遼寧工程技術大學; pinyin: Liáoníng Gōngchéng Jìshù Dàxué) has three campuses, two of which are located in Fuxin, Liaoning, China, and the third one is located in Huludao, Liaoning, China. The university is administered by the provincial government and State Administration of Work Safety.

== Overview ==
LNTU is classified as one of China's key national universities.

In 1978, the State Council of the PRC awarded LNTU, with 87 other higher education establishments, the status of 'key university'. In 1981, LNTU was granted the authority to award master's degrees and in 1993 was authorised to award doctoral degrees. In 1999, LNTU gained authority to establish a research mobile station to award engineering master's degree. LNTU is also authorised to enroll foreign students.

Disciplines either taught or researched at LNTU include engineering, science, liberal arts, management, economics and law. LNTU currently comprises 14 colleges and departments, including the College of Resources and Environment Engineering, College of Mechanical Engineering, College of Electronics and Information Engineering, College of Business Administration, Vocational College and the Department of Mechanics and Engineering. In total, 58 majors at undergraduate level and higher vocational level are offered at LNTU.

== Student, teaching, and research population ==
LNTU has an enrollment of over 29,000 students and 3,000 mature students. The university has three post-doctoral disciplines, 17 majors for degrees at doctoral level, 41 majors for master's degree, 11 majors for engineering master's degree, one key national subject, nine provincial and ministerial key subjects, and one national and eight ministerial key laboratories.

LNTU has 200 professors, 400 associate professors, 400 senior lecturers and 200 doctors or postgraduates undertaking doctoral studies

== Library ==
The library has a collection of more than 1.1 million books and 2,000 Chinese- and foreign-language periodicals.

== Intercollegiate relations ==
LNTU has established intercollegiate relations with more than ten universities and research institutes overseas, notably in Germany and the United States.
