= Xia Deren =

Chinese politician

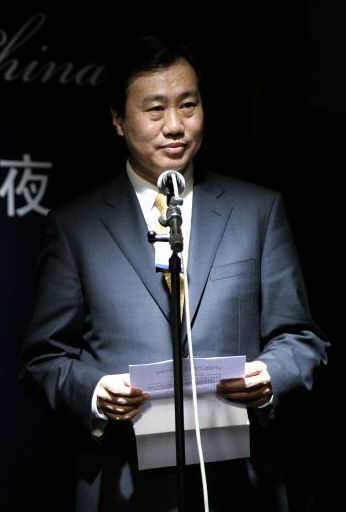
Xia Deren at the World Economic Forum in Davos, 2007

Xia Deren (Chinese: 夏德仁; born June 1955) is a Chinese politician. Since 2003, he has served as the Chairman of the People's Political Consultative Conference of Liaoning Province. He previously was Deputy Communist Party Secretary of Liaoning province, and the Party Secretary of Dalian.

== Major academic works ==
- Economic Development and Money Supply (published by China Financial Publishing House in 1992)
- Money and Banking (a textbook used by the People's Bank of China for the Ninth Five-Year Plan; published by China Financial Publishing House)
- Finance Review (Published by Dongbei University of Finance and Economics Press in March 1998)

== Honorable mentions ==
Rowan Callick, in the book, The Party Forever, inside China's Modern Communist Elite, Chapter 9 : Doing Business, interviews Xia Deren about business development in Dalian, China.

Thomas L. Friedman, in the book, The World Is Flat, chapter 1: While I was sleeping, section: The monitor is burning, interviews Xia Deren about education, Japanese corporations, and software development in Dalian, China.
