= National Forestry and Grassland Administration =

Chinese governmental agency

National Forestry and Grassland Administration (National Park Administration)
- 国家林业和草原局（国家公园局）
- National emblem of China

- Logo of the Administration

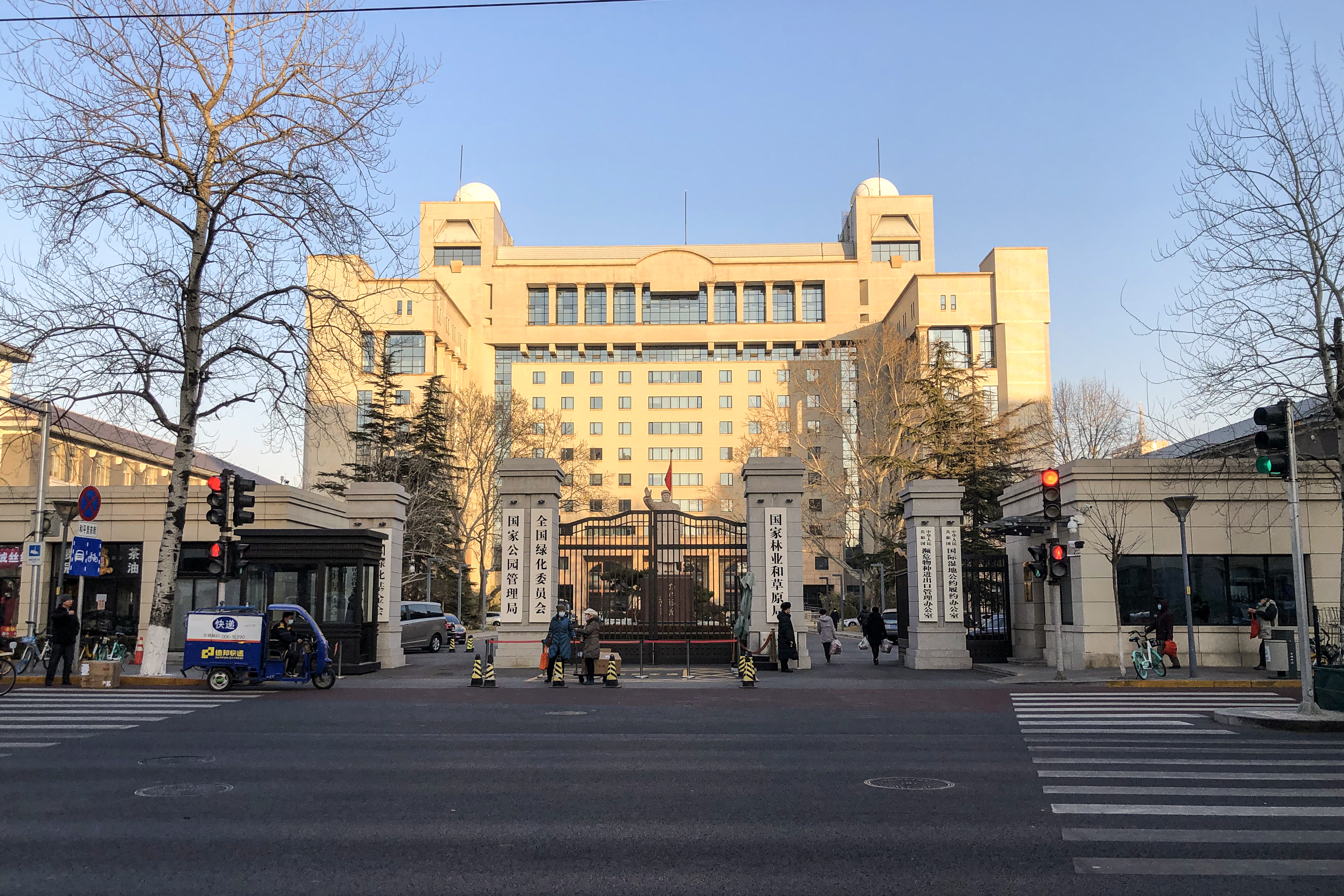

Agency overview
- Formed: 1949
- Jurisdiction: China
- Headquarters: 18 Hepingli East Street, Dongcheng, Beijing
- Motto: Clear waters and green mountains are as valuable as gold and silver mountains (绿水青山就是金山银山)
- Agency executive: Liu Guohong, Director
- Parent department: Ministry of Natural Resources
- Website: www.forestry.gov.cn

The National Forestry and Grassland Administration, concurrently known as the National Park Administration, is China's national bureau responsible for the supervision and management of forests, grasslands, wetlands, deserts, and terrestrial wildlife. It is managed by the Ministry of Natural Resources.

== History ==
The agency was originally founded in 1949 as the Ministry of Forestry and Farming. On November 5, 1951, it changed to the Ministry of Forestry, and the farming section was transferred to the Ministry of Agriculture. On March 10, 1998, it was renamed the National Forestry Administration. On 10 April 2018, the name was changed to the National Forestry and Grassland Administration as part of the deepening the reform of the Party and state institutions.

== Leadership ==
=== Heads ===
==== Ministry of Forestry and Farming ====
Name	Chinese name	Took office	Left office
Liang Xi	梁希	October 1949	November 1951

==== Ministry of Forestry ====
Name	Chinese name	Took office	Left office
Liang Xi	梁希	November 1951	December 1958
Liu Wenhui	刘文辉	28 April 1959	Early Cultural Revolution
Wang Yun	王云	6 October 1967	?
Luo Yuchuan	罗玉川	16 February 1979	30 August 1980
Yong Wentao	雍文涛	30 August 1980	April 1982
Yang Zhong	杨钟	9 April 1982	23 June 1987
Gao Dezhan	高德占	23 June 1987	March 1993
Xu Youfang	徐有芳	29 March 1993	August 1997
Chen Yaobang	陈耀邦	29 August 1997	March 1998

==== National Forestry Administration ====
Name	Chinese name	Took office	Left office
Wang Zhibao	王志宝	5 April 1998	2 December 2000
Zhou Shengxian	周生贤	2 December 2000	1 December 2005
Jia Zhibang	贾治邦	1 December 2005	25 March 2012
Zhao Shucong	赵树丛	25 March 2012	13 June 2015
Zhang Jianlong	张建龙	13 June 2015	April 2018

==== National Forestry and Grassland Administration ====
Name	Chinese name	Took office	Left office
Zhang Jianlong	张建龙	April 2018	March 2020
Guan Zhiou	关志鸥	8 June 2020	Incumbent
