= Politics of Tianjin =

The politics of Tianjin is structured in a dual party-government system like all other governing institutions in the mainland of the People's Republic of China (PRC).

The Mayor of Tianjin is the highest-ranking official in the People's Government of Tianjin. Since Tianjin is a direct-administered municipality, the mayor occupies the same level in the order of precedence as provincial governors. However, in the city's dual party-government governing system, the mayor has less power than the Tianjin Chinese Communist Party Municipal Committee Secretary, colloquially termed the "Tianjin CCP Party Chief".

== List of secretaries of the Tianjin Communist Party Committee ==
#	Name	Tenure	Notes
1	Huang Kecheng	January 1949 – June 1949	General
2	Huang Jing	June 1949 – April 1953	Father of Yu Zhengsheng
3	Huang Huoqing	April 1953 – June 1958	
4	Wan Xiaotang	June 1958 – September 1966	Died in office, criticized during Cultural Revolution, later rehabilitated.
5	Xie Xuegong	January 1967 – June 1978	Chairman of the Tianjin Revolutionary Committee
6	Lin Hujia	June 1978 – October 1978	
7	Chen Weida	October 1978 – October 1984	
8	Ni Zhifu	October 1984 – September 1987	
9	Li Ruihuan	September 1987 – October 1989	Later Chairman of the Chinese People's Political Consultative Conference; Politburo Standing Committee (1992–2002)
10	Tan Shaowen	October 1989 – February 1993	Died in office
–	Nie Bichu	February 1993 – March 1993	Acting
11	Gao Dezhan	March 1993 – August 1997	
12	Zhang Lichang	August 1997 – March 2007	
13	Zhang Gaoli	March 2007 – November 2012	Politburo Standing Committee (2012–); Vice Premier (2013–)
14	Sun Chunlan	November 2012 – December 2014	First female party chief
–	Huang Xingguo	December 2014 – September 2016	Acting; Sacked, found guilty of corruption, sentenced to prison
15	Li Hongzhong	September 2016 – December 2022	
16	Chen Min'er	December 2022 – present	

== List of chairmen of Tianjin People's Congress ==
1. Yan Dakai (阎达开): June 1980 – April 1983
2. Zhang Zaiwang (张再旺): April 1983 – May 1988
3. Wu Zhen (吴振): May 1988 – June 1993
4. Nie Bichu (聂璧初): June 1993 – May 1998
5. Zhang Lichang: May 1998 – January 2003
6. Fang Fengyou (房凤友): January 2003 – January 2006
7. Liu Shengyu (刘胜玉): January 2006 – January 2011
8. Xiao Huaiyuan (肖怀远): January 2011 – January 2018
9. Duan Chunhua (段春华): January 2018 – January 2023
10. Yu Yunlin (喻云林): January 2023 – present

== List of mayors of Tianjin ==
1. Huang Jing (黄敬): January 1949 – August 1952
2. Wu De (吴德): October 1952 – January 1955
3. Huang Huoqing(黄火青): January 1955 – June 1958
4. Li Gengtao (李耕涛): June 1958 – September 1963
5. Hu Zhaoheng (胡昭衡): September 1963 – 1966
6. Xie Xuegong (解学恭): December 1967 – June 1978
7. Lin Hujia (林乎加): June 1978 – October 1978
8. Chen Weida (陈伟达): October 1978 – June 1980
9. Hu Qili (胡启立): June 1980 – April 1982
10. Li Ruihuan(李瑞环): May 1982 – November 1989
11. Nie Bichu (聂璧初): November 1989 – June 1993
12. Zhang Lichang (张立昌): June 1993 – May 1998
13. Li Shenglin (李盛霖): May 1998 – December 2002
14. Dai Xianglong (戴相龙): December 2002 – December 2007
15. Huang Xingguo (黄兴国): December 2007 – September 2016
16. Wang Dongfeng (王东峰): September 2016 – October 2017
17. Zhang Guoqing (张国清): January 2018 – September 2020
18. Liao Guoxun (廖国勋): September 2020 – April 2022
19. Zhang Gong (张工): May 2022 – present

== List of chairmen of Tianjin CPPCC Tianjin Committee ==
1. Huang Huoqing (黄火青): March 1955 – March 1960
2. Wan Xiaotang (万晓塘): March 1960 – September 1966
3. Xie Xuegong (解学恭): December 1977 – July 1979
4. Yan Dakai (阎达开): July 1979 – June 1980
5. Huang Zhigang (黄志刚): June 1980 – April 1983
6. Chen Bing (陈冰): April 1983 – April 1987
7. Wu Zhen (吴振): April 1987 – May 1988
8. Tan Shaowen: May 1988 – April 1990
9. Liu Jinfeng (刘晋峰): April 1990 – May 1998
10. Fang Fengyou (房凤友): May 1998 – January 2003
11. Song Pingshun (宋平顺): January 2003 – June 2007
12. Xing Yuanmin (邢元敏): January 2008 – January 2013
13. He Lifeng: January 2013 – May 2014
14. Zang Xianfu (臧献甫): May 2014 – March 2018
15. Sheng Maolin (盛茂林): March 2018 – January 2023
16. Wang Changsong (王常松): January 2023 – present

== List of chairmen of Tianjin Supervisory Committee ==
1. Deng Xiuming (邓修明): January 2018 – November 2021
2. Chen Fukuan (陈辐宽): November 2021 – present

== See also ==
- Politics of Beijing
- Politics of Shanghai
- Politics of Chongqing
