= Mayor of Tianjin =

Mayor of the Tianjin Municipal People's Government
- 天津市人民政府市长
- National Emblem of China

- Flag of China

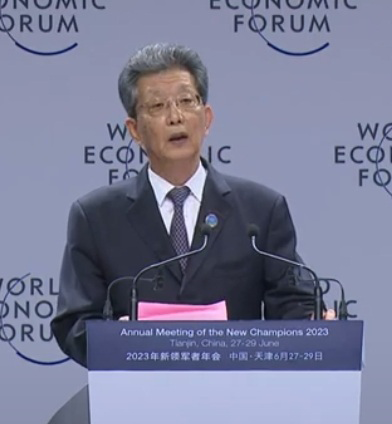
- Incumbent; Zhang Gong since 31 May 2022
- Tianjin Municipal People's Government
- Type: Head of government
- Status: Provincial and ministerial-level official
- Reports to: Tianjin Municipal People's Congress and its Standing Committee
- Nominator: Presidium of the Tianjin Municipal People's Congress
- Appointer: Tianjin Municipal People's Congress
- Term length: Five years, renewable
- Inaugural holder: Huang Jing
- Formation: 15 August 1949
- Deputy: Deputy Mayors; Secretary-General

The mayor of Tianjin, officially the Mayor of the Tianjin Municipal People's Government, is the head of Tianjin Municipality and leader of the Tianjin Municipal People's Government.

The mayor is elected by the Tianjin Municipal People's Congress, and responsible to it and its Standing Committee. The mayor is a provincial level official and is responsible for the overall decision-making of the municipal government. The mayor is assisted by an executive vice mayor as well as several vice mayors. The mayor generally serves as the deputy secretary of the Tianjin Municipal Committee of the Chinese Communist Party and as a member of the CCP Central Committee. The mayor the second-highest ranking official in the city after the secretary of the CCP Tianjin Committee. The current mayor is Zhang Gong, who took office on 30 December 2021.

== List of mayors ==
=== Republic of China ===
==== 1928–1937 ====
Officeholder	Term of office		Ref.
Officeholder	Took office	Left office	Ref.
Nan Guixin (1884–1966)	June 1928	September 1928	
Cui Tingxian (1875–1942)	September 1928	October 1930	
Zang Qifang (1894–1961)	October 1930	April 1931	
Zhang Xueming (1908–1983)	April 1931	October 1931	
Zhou Longguang (1885–?)	October 1931	December 1932	
Yu Xuezhong (1890–1964)	December 1932	August 1933	
Wang Tao (1866–1937)	August 1933	October 1934	
Zhang Tingye (1890–1973)	October 1934	June 1935	
Shang Zhen (1888–1978)	June 1935	July 1935	
Cheng Ke (1878–1936)	July 1935	November 1935	
Xiao Zhenying (1890–1947)	November 1935	August 1936	
Zhang Zizhong (1891–1940)	August 1936	July 1937	
Li Wentian (1894–1951)	July 1937	August 1937	

==== Japanese occupation (1937–1945) ====
Officeholder	Term of office		Ref.
Officeholder	Took office	Left office	Ref.
Gao Lingwei (1870–1940)	1 August 1937	7 January 1938	
Pan Yugui (1884–1961)	7 January 1938	28 April 1939	
Wen Shizhen (1877–1951)	28 April 1939	19 March 1943	
Wang Xugao (1890–1951)	19 March 1943	17 October 1943	
Li Pengtu (1898–?)	17 October 1943	15 November 1943	
Zhang Renli (1900–1951)	15 November 1943	1 March 1945	
Zhou Diping (?–?)	1 March 1945	29 September 1945	

==== 1945–1949 ====
Officeholder	Term of office		Political party	Ref.
Officeholder	Took office	Left office	Political party	Ref.
Zhang Tingye (1890–1973)	29 September 1945	November 1946	Kuomintang	
Du Jianshi (1907–1989)	November 1946	January 1949	Kuomintang	

=== People's Republic of China ===
No.	Officeholder	Term of office		Political party	Ref.
No.	Officeholder	Took office	Left office	Political party	Ref.
1	Huang Jing (1912–1958)	15 August 1949	August 1952	Chinese Communist Party	
2	Wu De (1913–1995)	August 1952	January 1955	Chinese Communist Party	
3	Huang Huoqing (1901–1999)	21 January 1955	4 July 1958	Chinese Communist Party	
4	Li Gengtao (1912–1974)	4 July 1958	28 December 1963	Chinese Communist Party	
5	Hu Zhaoheng (1915–1999)	28 December 1963	6 December 1967	Chinese Communist Party	
6	Xie Xuegong (1916–1993)	6 December 1967	June 1978	Chinese Communist Party	
7	Lin Hujia (1916–2018)	June 1978	October 1978	Chinese Communist Party	
8	Chen Weida (1916–1990)	October 1978	30 June 1980	Chinese Communist Party	
9	Hu Qili (born 1929)	30 June 1980	21 May 1982	Chinese Communist Party	
10	Li Ruihuan (born 1934)	21 May 1982	October 1989	Chinese Communist Party	
11	Nie Bichu (1928–2018)	October 1989	20 June 1993	Chinese Communist Party	
12	Zhang Lichang (1939–2008)	20 June 1993	30 May 1998	Chinese Communist Party	
13	Li Shenglin (born 1946)	May 1998	December 2002	Chinese Communist Party	
14	Dai Xianglong (born 1944)	30 December 2002	28 December 2007	Chinese Communist Party	
15	Huang Xingguo (born 1954)	28 December 2007	14 September 2016 (Note: Suspended since 10 September 2016. Resignation accepted by Standing Committee of Tianjin Municipal People's Congress on 14 September 2016)	Chinese Communist Party	
16	Wang Dongfeng (born 1958)	14 September 2016	22 December 2017 (Note: De facto not in office since 28 October 2017 due to work transfer. Resignation accepted by Standing Committee of Tianjin Municipal People's Congress on 22 December 2017)	Chinese Communist Party	
—	Vacant (Note: Executive Deputy Mayor Duan Chunhua presided over government work since 28 October 2017)				
17	Zhang Guoqing (born 1964)	2 January 2018	3 September 2020	Chinese Communist Party	
18	Liao Guoxun (1963–2022)	3 September 2020	27 April 2022 (Note: Died in office)	Chinese Communist Party	
—	Vacant (Note: Executive Deputy Mayor Liu Guiping presided over government work)				
19	Zhang Gong (born 1961)	31 May 2022	Incumbent	Chinese Communist Party	
