= Tianjin Municipal Committee of the Chinese People's Political Consultative Conference =

Tianjin Municipal Committee of the Chinese People's Political Consultative Conference 中国人民政治协商会议天津市委员会
- 14th
- Emblem of the Chinese People's Political Consultative Conference

Type
- Type: United front organ Constitutional convention (Historical); Legislature (Historical) of Chinese People's Political Consultative Conference

History
- Founded: March 6, 1955; 71 years ago
- Preceded by: Tianjin Municipal People's Congress Consultative Committee

Leadership
- Chairperson: Wang Changsong

Meeting place
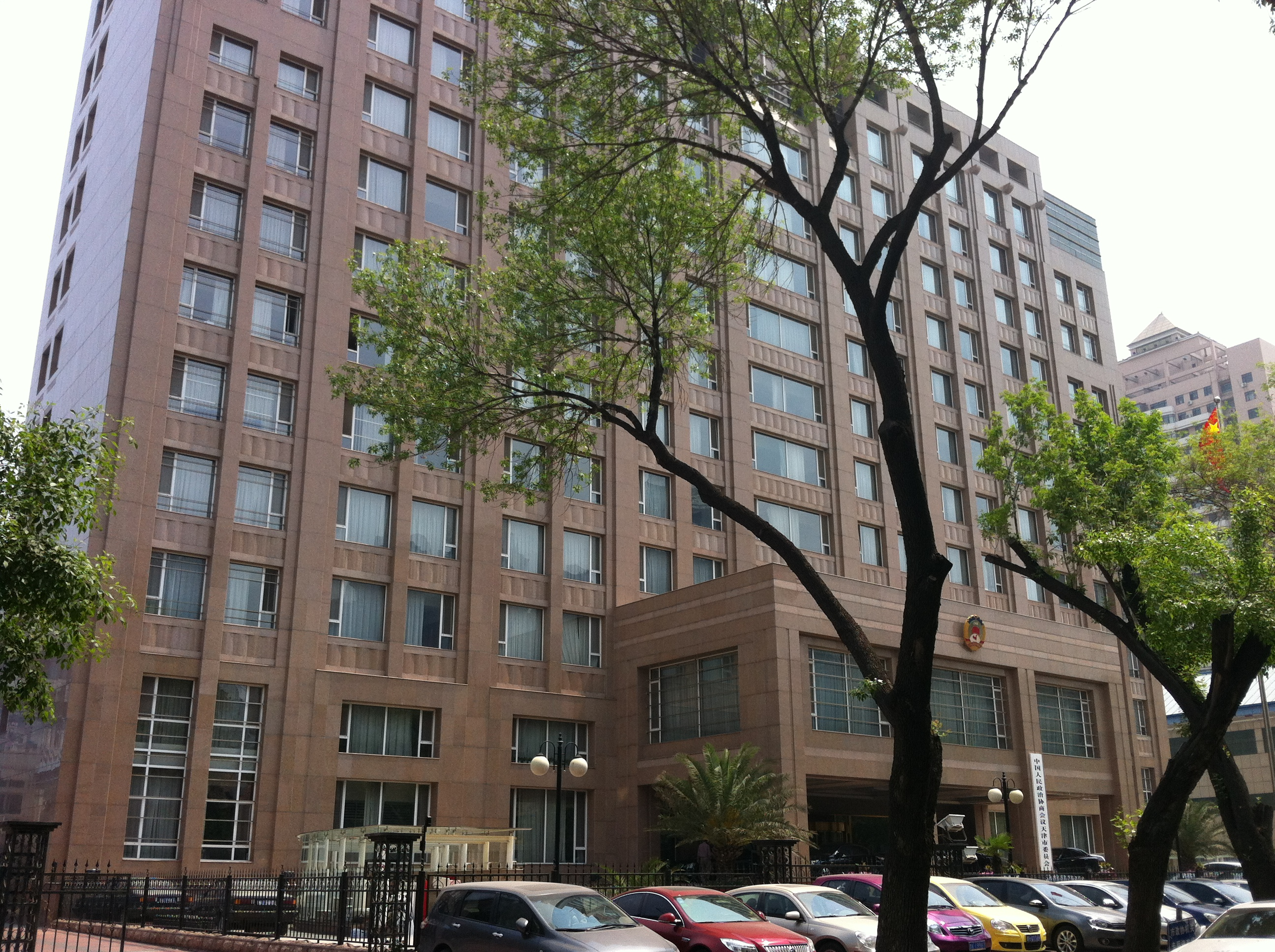

Website
- www.tjszx.gov.cn

Chinese name
- Simplified Chinese: 中国人民政治协商会议天津市委员会
- Traditional Chinese: 中國人民政治協商會議天津市委員會
Transcriptions
Standard Mandarin
- Hanyu Pinyin: Zhōngguó Rénmín Zhèngzhì Xiéshāng Huìyì Tiānjīnshì Wěiyuánhuì

Abbreviation
- Simplified Chinese: 天津市政协
- Traditional Chinese: 天津市政協
- Literal meaning: CPPCC Tianjin Municipal Committee
Transcriptions
Standard Mandarin
- Hanyu Pinyin: Tianjinshì Zhèngxié

The Tianjin Municipal Committee of the Chinese People's Political Consultative Conference (Chinese: 中国人民政治协商会议天津市委员会) is the advisory body and a local organization of the Chinese People's Political Consultative Conference in Tianjin, China. It is supervised and directed by the Tianjin Municipal Committee of the Chinese Communist Party.

== History ==
The Tianjin Municipal Committee of the Chinese People's Political Consultative Conference traces its origins to the Tianjin Municipal People's Congress Consultative Committee (天津市各界人民代表会议协商委员会), founded in September 1949.

== Term ==
=== 1st ===
- Term of Office: March 1955 – March 1960
- Chairperson: Huang Huoqing
- Vice Chairpersons: Wu Yanong, Li Zhuchen, Liu Xiying, Gu Xiaobo, Meng Qiujiang, Li Jiye, Yang Yizhou (April 1956 –), Bi Mingqi (April 1956 –), Zhu Jisheng (April 1956 –)

=== 2nd ===
- Term of Office: March 1960 – December 1963
- Chairperson: Wan Xiaotang
- Vice Chairpersons: Wang Kangzhi, Yang Yizhou, Zhao Ke, Zhang Guofan, Liu Xiying, Meng Qiujiang, Li Jiye, Yang Chunlin, Zhu Jisheng, Wang Guangying, Fan Quan, Tang Jiali, Yang Jianbai, Mu Zhifang

=== 3rd ===
- Term of Office: December 1963 – December 1965
- Chairperson: Wan Xiaotang
- Vice Chairpersons: Wang Kangzhi, Yang Yizhou, Zhang Guofan, Liu Xiying, Zhou Ru, Yang Chunlin, Zhu Jisheng, Wang Guangying, Fan Quan, Tang Jiali, Yang Jianbai, Mu Zhifang

=== 4th ===
- Term of Office: December 1965 – December 1977
- Chairperson: Wan Xiaotang
- Vice Chairpersons: Wang Kangzhi, Yang Yizhou, Zhang Guofan, Liu Xiying, Zhou Ru, Yang Chunlin, Zhu Jisheng, Wang Guangying, Fan Quan, Tang Jiali, Yang Jianbai, Mu Zhifang, Zhao Jinsheng

=== 5th ===
- Term of Office: December 1977 – June 1980
- Chairperson: Xie Xuegong → Yan Dakai (July 1979 –)
- Vice Chairpersons: Gu Yunting, Zhou Shutao, Mao Ping, Lu Da, Li Ding, Han Zhen, Wang Peiren, Fan Qingdian, Zhao Jinsheng, Yang Jianbai, Fan Quan, He Zongqian, Huang Difei, Huang Yusheng, Wu Tingqiu, Yu Zhiyuan (July 1979 –)

=== 6th ===
- Term of Office: June 1980 – April 1983
- Chairperson: Huang Zhigang
- Vice Chairpersons: Yu Zhiyuan, Zhu Ziqiang, Kang Tiejun, Xing Yanzi, Yang Tianshou, Li Ding, Li Shouzhen, Wu Tingqiu, He Zongqian, Chen Ruyu, Zhou Ru, Zheng Tianting, Jin Xianzhai, Fan Rusheng, Zhao Jinsheng, Ha Litian, Lou Ningxian, Huang Yusheng, Huang Difei, Han Zhen, Yu Songting, Miao Tianrui, Liao Canhui, Li Shusen (April 1982 –)

=== 7th ===
- Term of Office: April 1983 – May 1988
- Chairperson: Chen Bing → Wu Zhen (April 1987 –)
- Vice Chairpersons: Wang Enhui, Zhu Ziqiang, Li Shusen, Lou Ningxian, Zhao Jinsheng, Zhou Ru, Huang Difei, Huang Yusheng, Miao Tianrui, Yang Tianshou, He Zongqian, Yu Songting, Kang Tiejun, Chen Ruyu, Liao Canhui, Xiao Yuan (October 1985 –), Li Yuan (April 1987 –)

=== 8th ===
- Term of Office: May 1988 – June 1993
- Chairperson: Tan Shaowen → Liu Jinfeng (April 1990 –)
- Vice Chairpersons: Xiao Yuan, Zhao Jinsheng, He Guomo, Huang Difei, Huang Yusheng, Yang Tianshou, Yu Songting, Kang Tiejun, Chen Ruyu, Liao Canhui, Yang Hui

=== 9th ===
- Term of Office: June 1993 – May 1998
- Chairperson: Liu Jinfeng
- Vice Chairpersons: Li Changxing, Huang Yanzhi, Chen Ruyu, Liao Canhui, Lu Huansheng, Yu Guocong, Chen Peilie, Wang Jitao, Zhang Zhuoruo, Chen Shuxun, Zhang Yonggen (February 1995 – )

=== 10th ===
- Term of Office: May 1998 – January 2003
- Chairperson: Fang Fengyou
- Vice Chairpersons: Zhang Haosheng, Zhang Yonggen, Zhu Liankang, Zhang Dequan, Yang Dazheng, Zhou Shaoxi, Yao Jianquan, Cao Xiurong, Zhao Kezheng, Cheng Jinpei, Cai Shiyan

=== 11th ===
- Term of Office: January 2003 – January 2008
- Chairperson: Song Pingshun
- Vice Chairpersons: Lu Jinfa, Ye Hourong, Zhou Shaoxi, Yao Jianquan, Cao Xiurong, Zhao Kezheng, Cai Shiyan, Wang Jiayu, Zhu Tan, Lu Xilei, Wang Wenhua (January 2007 –)

=== 12th ===
- Term of Office: January 2008 – January 2013
- Chairperson: Xing Yuanmin
- Vice Chairpersons: Wang Wenhua, Yu Haichao, Chen Zhifeng, Liu Changxi, He Ronglin, Cao Xiaohong, Zhang Daning, Tian Huiguang, Chen Yongchuan
- Secretary-General: Liu Kun

=== 13th ===
- Term of Office: January 2013 – January 2018
- Chairperson: He Lifeng → Zang Xianfu
- Vice Chairpersons: Li Wenxi, Wang Zhiping, Tian Huiguang (– January 2017), Chen Yongchuan, Wu Changshun, Gao Yubao, Shen Zhongyang, Wei Dapeng, Li Changjin
- Secretary-General: Li Jinliang

=== 14th ===
- Term of Office: January 2018 – January 2023
- Chairperson: Sheng Maolin
- Vice Chairpersons: Wei Dapeng (– January 2021), Gao Yubao (– February 2022), Shen Zhongyang (– May 2020), Li Changjin, Li Shaohong, Shang Binyi, Zhao Zhonghua, Zhang Jinying, Qi Chengxi (January 2019 –), Cao Xiaohong (January 2021 –), Wang Jianguo (January 2021 –), Sun Wenkui (February 2022 –), Li Wenhai (February 2022 –)
- Secretary-General: Gao Xuezhong

=== 15th ===
- Term of Office: January 2023 – 2028
- Chairperson: Wang Changsong
- Vice Chairpersons: Sun Wenkui, Li Shaohong (– January 2025), Shang Binyi, Zhang Jinying, Qi Chengxi, Wang Jianguo (–January 2025), Li Jianping, Gao Xiumei, Zhang Fengbao, Liu Hui (January 2025–)
- Secretary-General: Gao Xuezhong
