= Party Secretary of Tianjin =

Municipal government position in China

Secretary of the Tianjin Municipal Committee of the Chinese Communist Party
- 中国共产党天津市委员会书记
- Emblem of the Chinese Communist Party

- Flag of the Chinese Communist Party

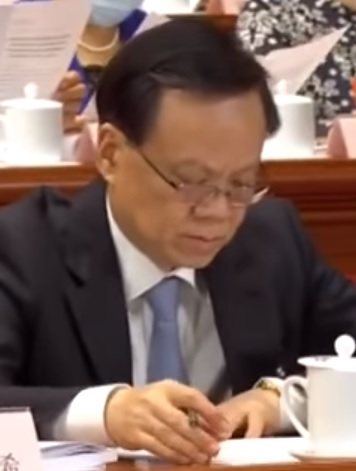
- Incumbent; Chen Min'er since 8 December 2022
- Tianjin Municipal Committee of the Chinese Communist Party
- Type: Party Committee Secretary
- Status: Provincial and ministerial-level official
- Member of: Tianjin Municipal Standing Committee
- Nominator: Central Committee
- Appointer: Tianjin Municipal Committee; Central Committee
- Inaugural holder: Huang Kecheng
- Formation: January 1949
- Deputy: Deputy Secretary; Secretary-General

The secretary of the Tianjin Municipal Committee of the Chinese Communist Party is the leader of the Tianjin Municipal Committee of the Chinese Communist Party (CCP). As the CCP is the sole ruling party of the People's Republic of China (PRC), the secretary is the highest ranking post in Tianjin.

The secretary is officially appointed by the CCP Central Committee based on the recommendation of the CCP Organization Department, which is then approved by the Politburo and its Standing Committee. The secretary can be also appointed by a plenary meeting of the Tianjin Municipal Committee, but the candidate must be the same as the one approved by the central government. The secretary leads the Standing Committee of the Tianjin Municipal Committee, and since at least 2002, the secretary has consistently been a member of the CCP Politburo. The secretary leads the work of the Municipal Committee and its Standing Committee. The secretary is outranks the mayor, who is generally the deputy secretary of the committee.

The current secretary is Chen Min'er, a member of the CCP Politburo, who took office on 8 December 2022.

== List of party secretaries ==
No.	Image	Name	Term start	Term end	Ref.
1		Huang Kecheng	January 1949	June 1949	
2		Huang Jing	June 1949	April 1953	
3		Huang Huoqing	April 1953	June 1958	
4		Wan Xiaotang	June 1958	September 1966	
5		Xie Xuegong	January 1967	June 1978	
6		Lin Hujia	June 1978	October 1978	
7		Chen Weida	October 1978	October 1984	
8		Ni Zhifu	October 1984	September 1987	
9		Li Ruihuan	September 1987	October 1989	
10		Tan Shaowen	October 1989	February 1993	
–		Nie Bichu	February 1993	March 1993	
11		Gao Dezhan	March 1993	22 August 1997	
12		Zhang Lichang	22 August 1997	25 March 2007	
13		Zhang Gaoli	25 March 2007	21 November 2012	
14		Sun Chunlan	21 November 2012	30 December 2014	
–		Huang Xingguo	30 December 2014	1 September 2016	
15		Li Hongzhong	1 September 2016	8 December 2022	
16		Chen Min'er	8 December 2022	Incumbent	
