= Tianjin Municipal People's Government =

Local government in China

Tianjin Municipal People's Government 天津市人民政府

Leadership
- Mayor: Zhang Gong since 31 May 2021
- Parent body: Central People's Government; Tianjin Municipal People's Congress
- Elected by: Tianjin Municipal People's Congress

Meeting place
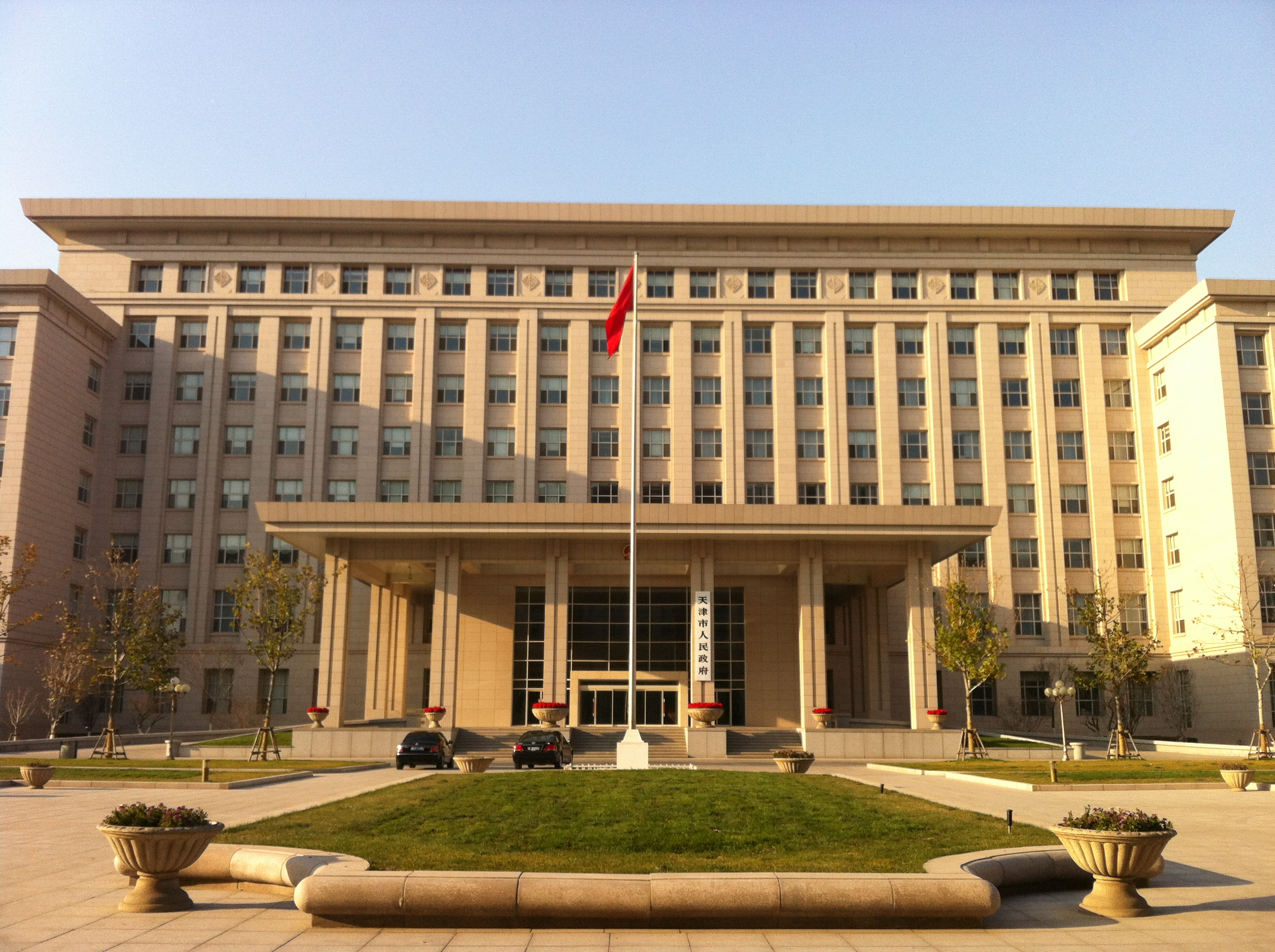
- Headquarters

Website
- http://www.tj.gov.cn/

The Tianjin Municipal People's Government is the local administrative agency of Tianjin. It is officially elected by the Tianjin Municipal People's Congress and is formally responsible to the Municipal Congress and its Standing Committee. The municipal government is headed by a mayor, currently Zhang Gong. Under the country's one-party system, the mayor is subordinate to the secretary of the Tianjin Municipal Committee of the Chinese Communist Party.

== History ==
The Tianjin Municipal People's Government was established on January 15, 1949. In August 1954, the Tianjin Municipal People's Committee was established and formally reorganized on January 21, 1955. On June 30, 1980, the Tianjin Municipal Revolutionary Committee was abolished and the Tianjin Municipal People's Government was re-established.

== Organization ==
The organization of the Tianjin Municipal People's Government includes:

- General Office of the Tianjin Municipal People's Government

=== Component Departments ===
- Tianjin Development and Reform Commission
- Tianjin Municipal Education Commission
- Tianjin Science and Technology Bureau
- Tianjin Municipal Bureau of Industry and Information Technology
- Tianjin Municipal Ethnic and Religious Affairs Committee
- Tianjin Public Security Bureau
- Tianjin State Security Bureau
- Tianjin Civil Affairs Bureau
- Tianjin Municipal Bureau of Justice
- Tianjin Finance Bureau
- Tianjin Municipal Human Resources and Social Security Bureau
- Tianjin Municipal Planning and Natural Resources Bureau
- Tianjin Ecological Environment Bureau
- Tianjin Municipal Housing and Urban-Rural Development Committee
- Tianjin Urban Management Committee
- Tianjin Municipal Transportation Commission
- Tianjin Water Authority
- Tianjin Agriculture and Rural Affairs Commission
- Tianjin Municipal Bureau of Commerce
- Tianjin Municipal Bureau of Culture and Tourism
- Tianjin Municipal Health Commission
- Tianjin Veterans Affairs Bureau
- Tianjin Emergency Management Bureau
- Tianjin Audit Bureau
- Tianjin Municipal People's Government Foreign Affairs Office
- Tianjin Municipal Market Supervision and Administration Commission

=== Directly affiliated special institutions ===
- State-owned Assets Supervision and Administration Commission of Tianjin Municipal People's Government

=== Organizations under the Municipal Government ===
- Tianjin Sports Bureau
- Tianjin Statistics Bureau
- Tianjin Municipal Bureau of Statistics
- Tianjin Investment Promotion Bureau
- Tianjin Medical Insurance Bureau
- Tianjin Municipal Government Affairs Bureau
- Tianjin Municipal People's Government Research Office
- Tianjin Municipal People's Government Petition Office
- Tianjin Municipal People's Government National Defense Mobilization Office
- Tianjin Municipal People's Government Cooperation and Exchange Office
- Tianjin Municipal People's Government Government Service Office

=== Directly affiliated institutions ===
- Tianjin Investment Promotion Office
- Tianjin Housing Provident Fund Management Center is named after Tianjin Housing Provident Fund Management Committee.
- Tianjin Education Admissions and Examinations Institute
- Tianjin North Performing Arts Group
- Tianjin North China Geological Survey Bureau
- Tianjin Academy of Painting
- Tianjin Academy of Social Sciences
- Tianjin Geology and Mineral Exploration and Development Bureau
- Tianjin Supply and Marketing Cooperative
- Tianjin Economic Development Research Institute
- Tianjin Academy of Agricultural Sciences
- Tianjin Economic Development Research Institute
- Tianjin Government Investment Project Review Center
- Tianjin Science and Technology Museum
- Tianjin Municipal Highway Administration

=== Department Management Agency ===
- The Tianjin Municipal People's Government Advisory Office is managed by the * General Office of the Municipal People's Government and is affiliated with the Institute of Literature and History.
- Tianjin Municipal Bureau of Grain and Material Reserves is managed by the Municipal Development and Reform Commission.
- Tianjin Prison Administration Bureau is managed by the Municipal Bureau of Justice.
- Tianjin Drug Rehabilitation Administration is managed by the Municipal Bureau of Justice.
- Tianjin Municipal Public Utilities Administration Bureau is managed by the Municipal Urban Management Committee.
- Tianjin Road Transport Administration Bureau is managed by the Municipal Transportation Commission.
- Tianjin Port and Shipping Administration is managed by the Municipal Transportation Commission.
- Tianjin Drug Administration is managed by the Municipal Market Supervision Administration.
- Tianjin Intellectual Property Office is managed by the Municipal Market Supervision and Administration Commission.
- Tianjin Municipal Bureau of Disease Control and Prevention, managed by the Municipal Health Commission.

=== Dispatched institutions ===
- Sino-Singapore Tianjin Eco-City Management Committee
- Tianjin Binhai Hi-Tech Industrial Development Zone Management Committee
- Tianjin Port Free Trade Zone Administration Committee
- Tianjin Dongjiang Free Trade Port Area Management Committee
- Tianjin Haihe Education Park Management Committee
- Tianjin Economic and Technological Development Zone Administration Committee
- China (Tianjin) Pilot Free Trade Zone Administration Committee

=== Dispatched agencies ===
- Tianjin Municipal People's Government Office in Beijing
- Tianjin Municipal People's Government Office in Shanghai
- Tianjin Municipal People's Government Office in Guangzhou
- Tianjin Municipal People's Government Office in Shenyang
- Tianjin Municipal People's Government Office in Chengdu
- Tianjin Municipal People's Government Office in Xi'an
- Tianjin Municipal People's Government Office in Fuzhou
- Tianjin Municipal People's Government Office in Ürümqi
- Tianjin Municipal People's Government Office in Jinan
- Tianjin Municipal People's Government Administrative Approval Management Office
- Tianjin Small and Medium Enterprises Development Promotion Bureau
