= Wu Changshun =

Chinese politician

- 武长顺
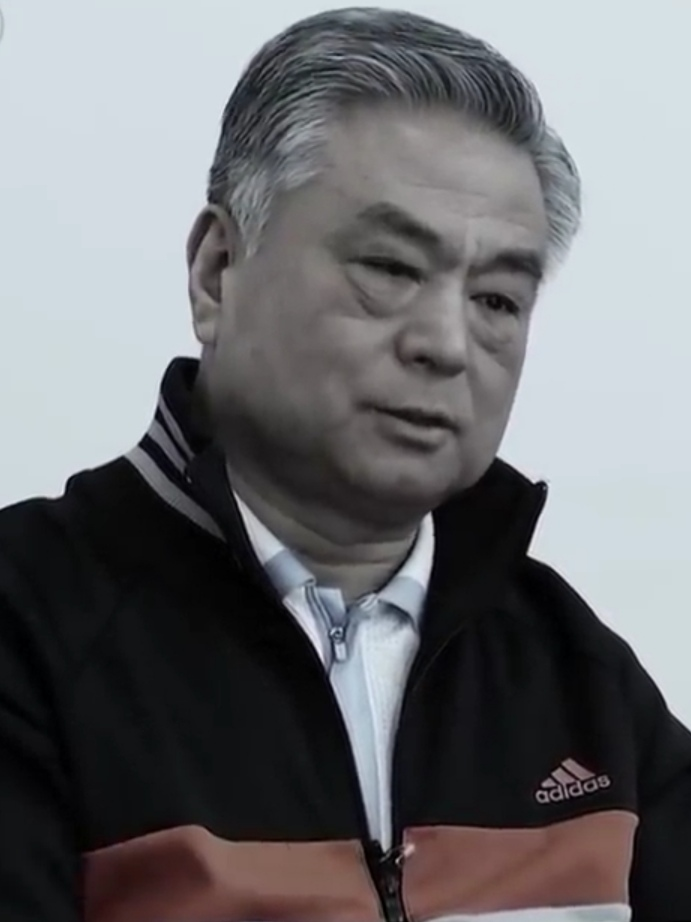

Vice Chairman of the Tianjin Municipal Chinese People's Political Consultative Conference
- In office January 2013 – July 2014
- Chairman: He Lifeng

Chief of the Tianjin Public Security Bureau
- In office February 2003 – July 2014
- Preceded by: Song Pingshun
- Succeeded by: Zhao Fei (赵飞)

Personal details
- Born: January 1954 (age 72) Tianjin
- Party: Chinese Communist Party (expelled)
- Education: Tongji University
- Nickname(s): Wu Ye (武爷; "Lord Wu")

Wu Changshun
- Traditional Chinese: 武長順
- Simplified Chinese: 武长顺
Transcriptions
Standard Mandarin
- Hanyu Pinyin: Wǔ Chángshùn

Wu Changshun (born January 1954) is the former police chief of the municipality of Tianjin, China. Wu is also an inventor, and has 35 patents and utility models to his credit. Wu spent 44 years working for the Tianjin Public Security Bureau (i.e. police force) and was the chief of the police force for some eleven years. Wu was dismissed from office in July 2014, and was placed under investigation by the Central Commission for Discipline Inspection. He was expelled from the Chinese Communist Party in February 2015.

== Career ==
Wu was born in January 1954 into a farming family in rural Tianjin, his father worked on a farming cooperative, while his mother was a homemaker. He was the second of five children. He spent his childhood at the Wu family courtyard where he lived with his extended family. As a child, Wu enjoyed playing football. Wu attended No. 28 Middle School in Tianjin, where he completed middle school in 1970. Shortly after that, he joined the Tianjin police force as a trainee at the age of 16. He joined the Chinese Communist Party (CCP) in September 1973.

Wu worked his way up the ranks of the Tianjin Public Security Bureau, beginning as a junior officer, he was promoted to team leader, division chief, and deputy director general. In September 1998 he was appointed as the CCP Deputy Committee Secretary of Tianjin Public Security Bureau. In February 2003, 32 years after he joined the force, he became the chief police commissioner of Tianjin. He would serve in the role of the city's top cop for over ten years. In June 2003, he also took up the post of political commissar of the People's Armed Police Tianjin division. In November 2005, he took up the office of Deputy Secretary of Tianjin Political and Legal Affairs Committee (Zhengfawei).

In October 2011, as he neared retirement age, Wu was appointed to become the Vice Chairman of the Tianjin Municipal Committee of the Chinese People's Political Consultative Conference (a position at the Sub-Provincial level). He was re-confirmed in 2013. He left his post as chief of police on July 20, 2014.

=== Patents ===
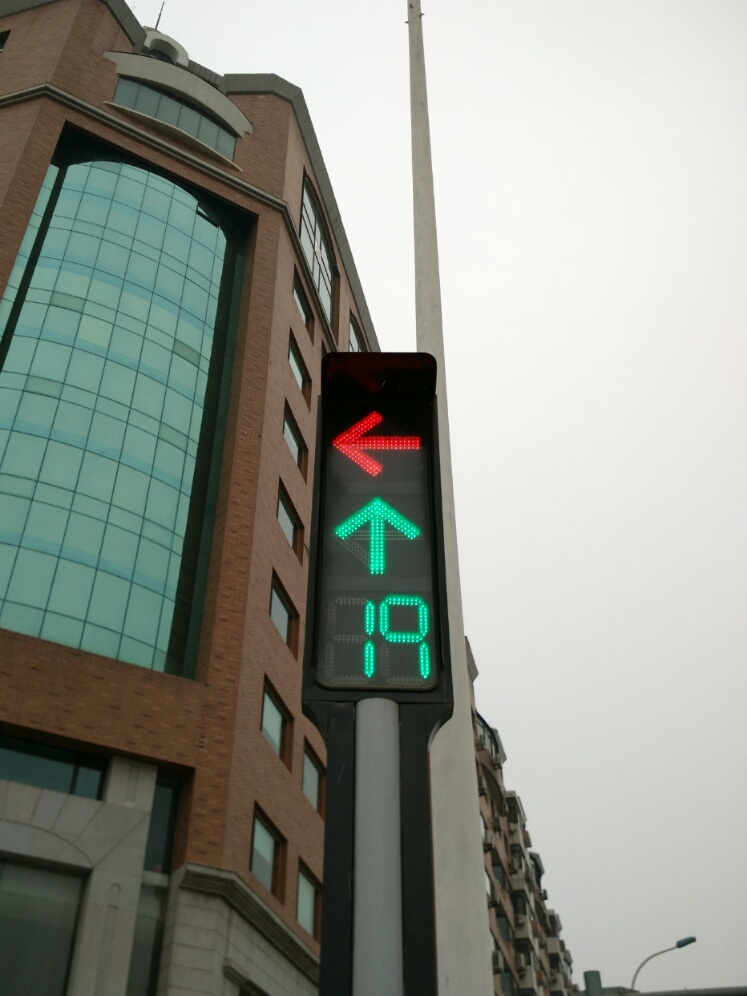
Traffic lights found in Tianjin, patented by Wu Changshun

During his time as police chief, Wu had applied for 35 patents, mostly for inventions in the public transport sector. Of the 35 patents, four of which were solely accredited to Wu himself, while Wu had collaborated with others on the remaining 31. Many of these patents were subsequently put into application in transport-related initiatives in Tianjin. In particular, Wu's patent on a "smart transportation management system" – essentially used to control the timing of traffic lights – were put into use across the city of Tianjin.

== Investigation ==
On July 20, 2014, it was reported that Wu Changshun would be investigated by the Central Commission for Discipline Inspection (CCDI) for "serious disciplinary violations". On July 24, he was removed from his posts. Wu was the first provincial-level official (Tianjin, as a direct-controlled municipality, enjoys province-level status) from Tianjin to be investigated for disciplinary violations since the 18th National Congress of the Chinese Communist Party.

On February 13, 2015, Wu was expelled from the CCP. The CCDI investigation into Wu concluded that he had committed a wide litany of offenses, including "accepting cash gifts, claiming personal expenses for reimbursement, taking part in lavish banquets, accepting and giving bribes, embezzled massive public funds, re-directed public funds for illicit use, abuse of power, violated regulations about public officials with business interests, sought illicit gain during the promotion of subordinates and in the operations of businesses in which he had an interest, and adultery." It went on to mention that, "since the 18th Party Congress Wu did not retreat from his actions, which were especially egregious in nature, and became an extraordinarily bad influence on society." Judging based on the length of the 'indictment' and the extent of language used, Wu's case may well be one of the most serious yet in the campaign against corruption initiated by Xi Jinping and Wang Qishan.

Regarding Wu Changshun, General Secretary of the Chinese Communist Party Xi Jinping was reported to have said to a discipline inspection conference, "in Tianjin there is a guy that people call Wu Ye (roughly, "Lord Wu"). Pretty much all the parking lots in that city belonged to his family... it was absolute madness; totally despicable."

On May 27, 2017, Wu was sentenced by the Zhengzhou Intermediate People's Court to death sentence with reprieve without commutation or parole when the sentence was automatically reduced to life imprisonment; he was convicted of plundering the public fund worth 342 million yuan (~$50 million), taking bribes worth 84.4 million yuan (~$12.32 million), redirecting public fund worth 101 million yuan (~$14.74 million) for illicit use, giving bribes worth 10.57 million yuan (~$1.54 million), abuse of power and ordering his subordinates to shield suspects who avoided being investigated.

== Public image ==
Wu was known to traverse the city's streets on a bicycle, tending to the concerns of ordinary people, and devoting much of his working time to on-the-scene guidance. Wu became famous in Tianjin for resolving seemingly intractable disputes and for showing up personally to handle everything from legal procedural complaints to a broken traffic light. During his time in office he cultivated an image of an approachable populist and a "man of the people". Wu appeared frequently on the Traffic Light program of the Tianjin traffic radio station to address concerns such as traffic congestion.

Speaking of his own career, Wu Changshun said that he started climbing from the lowest rung of the ladder, going step-by-step from a junior police officer to team leader to division head to police chief. Wu said, "when it comes to climbing the career ladder, I was playing a methodical game of chess, never once did I play a game of checkers [i.e., 'jump' multiple levels in a promotion]." Wu was reported to have been involved in soliciting prostitutes in 1992. While rumours about this alleged incident circulated among Tianjin residents, many do not regard it as damaging to Wu's public image; Wu's former neighbour said that "such activities are fairly common place among high officials."

== Personal life ==
Wu is married to a woman surnamed "Zhang" who worked for the Tianjin police department. They had one daughter. Wu was an avid football player and frequently played in local tournaments involving his colleagues. He also played tennis.

== See also ==
- Wang Lijun, former police chief of Chongqing
- Zhang Lichang
