= Tianjin Municipal Supervisory Commission =

The Tianjin Municipal Supervisory Commission (Chinese: 天津市监察委员会, 天津市监察委), or Supervisory Commission of Tianjin Municipal, Tianjin Supervisory Commission is a provincial-level local state supervisory authority in Tianjin, co-located with the Disciplinary Inspection Committee of the Tianjin Municipal Committee of the Chinese Communist Party. It was established in January 2017 to assume the functions of the former Tianjin Municipal Supervisory Bureau. The director of the Tianjin Municipal Supervision Commission is elected by the Tianjin Municipal People's Congress and is accountable to both the Congress and its Standing Committee, as well as the Supervision Commission of the People's Republic of China.

== History ==
In 2018, pursuant to the Supervision Law of the People's Republic of China and the Tianjin Municipal Institutional Reform Program, the Tianjin Municipal Supervision Commission was established as a provincial-level national supervisory authority, co-located with the CCP Tianjin Municipal Commission for Discipline Inspection.
