= Tianjin Municipal People's Congress =

Tianjin Municipal People's Congress 天津市人民代表大会
- 18th Tianjin Municipal People's Congress

Type
- Type: Province-level people's congress

Leadership
- Chairman of the Standing Committee: Yu Yunlin, CCP since 15 January 2023

Elections
- Tianjin Municipal People's Congress voting system: Plurality-at-large voting & Two-round system

Meeting place
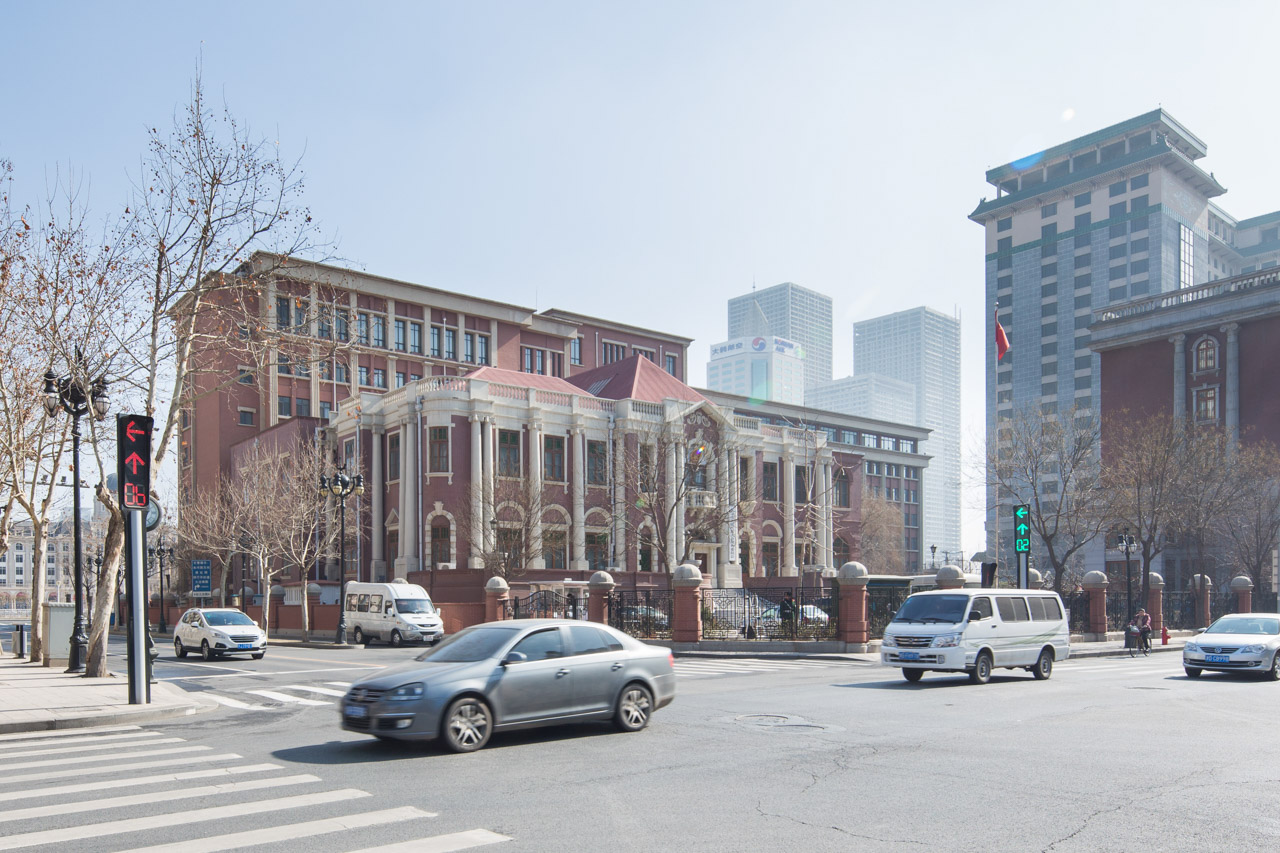
- Meeting place

Tianjin Municipal People's Congress
- Simplified Chinese: 天津市人民代表大会
- Traditional Chinese: 天津市人民代表大會
Transcriptions
Standard Mandarin
- Hanyu Pinyin: Tiānjīn Shì Rénmín Dàibiǎo Dàhuì

The Tianjin Municipal People's Congress is the local people's congress of Tianjin, a direct-administered municipality of China. The Congress is elected for a term of five years. The Tianjin Municipal People's Congress meetings are held at least once a year. After a proposal by more than one-fifth of the deputies, a meeting of the people's congress at the corresponding level may be convened temporarily.

== History ==
The Standing Committee of the Tianjin Municipal People's Congress was launched in June 1980.

== Organization ==
=== Chairpersons of the Standing Committee ===
Name	Took office	Left office	Ref.
Yan Dakai	30 June 1980	9 April 1983	
Zhang Zaiwang	9 April 1983	22 May 1988	
Wu Zhen	22 May 1988	19 June 1993	
Nie Bichu	19 June 1993	30 May 1998	
Zhang Lichang	30 May 1998	24 January 2003	
Fang Fengyou	24 January 2003	19 January 2006	
Liu Shengyu	20 January 2006	19 January 2011	
Xiao Huaiyuan	20 January 2011	28 January 2018	
Duan Chunhua	28 January 2018	15 January 2023	
Yu Yunlin	15 January 2023	Incumbent	

== See also ==
- System of people's congress
