= Tan Shaowen =

Chinese politician (1929–1993)

- 谭绍文

Party Secretary of Tianjin
- In office September 1989 – February 1993
- Preceded by: Li Ruihuan
- Succeeded by: Nie Bichu

Chairman of the CPPCC Municipal Committee of Tianjin
- In office May 1988 – April 1990
- Preceded by: Wu Zhen (吴振)
- Succeeded by: Liu Jinfeng (刘晋峰)

Personal details
- Born: July 4, 1929 Xinjin County, Sichuan, China
- Died: February 3, 1993 (aged 63) Tianjin, China
- Party: Chinese Communist Party

Tan Shaowen (Chinese: 谭绍文; July 4, 1929 – February 3, 1993) was a Chinese politician. He served as the Communist Party Chief and top leader of the direct-controlled municipality of Tianjin, and was a member of the Politburo of the Chinese Communist Party, one of the most powerful political bodies in the People's Republic of China. However, he died in 1993 before completing the full term of his office.

== Early life and career ==
Tan Shaowen was born on July 4, 1929 in Xinjin County, Sichuan province. Both his parents worked as post and telecommunications employees. He attended primary and secondary school in Xinjin.

From 1948 to 1952 Tan attended several institutes of higher learning, including the Ming Yin College in Chengdu Textile Engineering and the Northwest Institute of Textile Engineering.

He was assigned to a state-owned cotton mill in Tianjin as a technician from 1953 to 1958. He became a teacher, and eventually the deputy director of the Woven Textile Industry School in Tianjin.

From 1958 to 1966 he was the Vice Director of the Hebei Institute of Textiles' Office of Academic Affairs. He eventually went on to become the President of the Hebei University of Technology.

== Political career ==
In May 1953, Tan joined the Communist Youth League of China, and became a full member of the Chinese Communist Party in May 1953.

From August 1981 to May 1982, he served as the Deputy Director, the Deputy Party Secretary, and eventually the Director of the Tianjin Education Committee.

In May 1982, Tan Shaowen became a member of the CCP Tianjin Committee, and was promoted to Deputy Communist Party Chief of Tianjin in March 1983. He was responsible for education, science and technology, and propaganda in Tianjin. In May 1988 he became Chairman of the CPPCC Municipal Committee of Tianjin, and in September 1989 he was promoted to Communist Party Chief, the top government post of Tianjin.

In October 1992, Tan Shaowen became a member of the 14th Central Committee of the Chinese Communist Party, and was subsequently elected by that committee to serve in the 14th Politburo of the Chinese Communist Party, under the leadership of Jiang Zemin. Tan was supposedly drawn into the central leadership in order to counteract the growing trend for local politicians to ignore the policy of the central government.

Due to his early death, Tan served in only one of the seven Plenary Sessions of the 14th Central Committee of the Chinese Communist Party.

== Political achievements ==
Tan Shaowen is credited with the modernisation of the Tianjin education system, as well as undertaking a series of measures to bolster Tianjin's economy. In terms of economic reform, Tan focused mainly on medium to large state-owned enterprises, and also constructed several development zones in Tianjin, including the New Technology Industrial Park. He also constructed urban and economic infrastructure, and promoted Tianjin to foreign investors.

== Death ==
Tan died in Tianjin on February 3, 1993, at the age of 63 due to lung cancer. His death was significant, as it meant that the city of Tianjin was no longer represented in the Politburo. The next Tianjin party chief to gain a seat on the Politburo was Zhang Lichang in 2002.
