= Zhang Gaoli =

Former Vice Premier of the People's Republic of China

- 张高丽
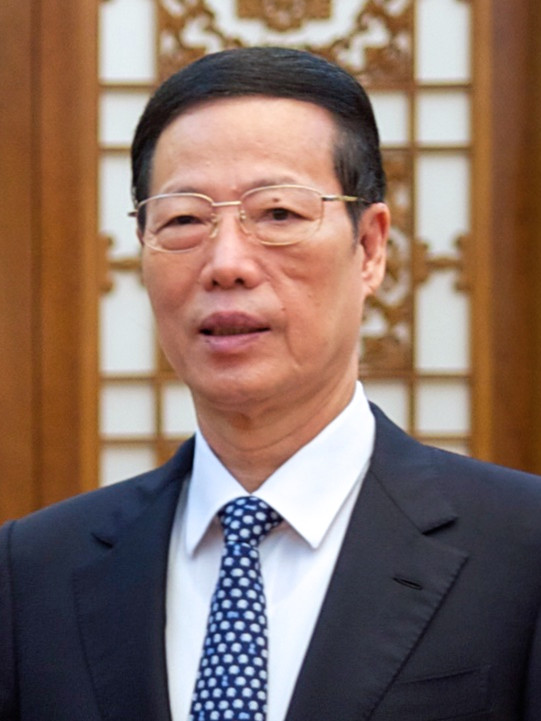
- Zhang in 2014

Vice Premier of China
- In office 16 March 2013 – 19 March 2018
- Premier: Li Keqiang

Party Secretary of Tianjin
- In office 25 March 2007 – 21 November 2012
- Deputy: Dai Xianglong (Mayor); Huang Xingguo
- Preceded by: Zhang Lichang
- Succeeded by: Sun Chunlan

Party Secretary of Shandong
- In office 23 November 2002 – 26 March 2007
- Deputy: Han Yuqun (Governor)
- Preceded by: Wu Guanzheng
- Succeeded by: Li Jianguo

Governor of Shandong
- In office 6 December 2001 – 13 January 2003
- Party Secretary: Wu Guanzheng
- Preceded by: Li Chunting
- Succeeded by: Han Yuqun

Personal details
- Born: November 1947 (age 78) Chinchiang County, Fukien, China
- Party: Chinese Communist Party
- Spouse: Kang Jie
- Children: 1 son Zhang Xiaoyan (adopted daughter)
- Education: Xiamen University
- Central institution membership: 2002–2017: 16th, 17th, 18th Central Committee; 2007–2017: 17th, 18th Politburo; 2012–2017: 18th Politburo Standing Committee; Leading group posts: 2013–2018: Leader, Leading Group for Coordinating the South-North Water Transfer Project; 2013–2018: Leader, Leading Group for Coordinating the Three Gorges Dam Project; 2013–2018: Deputy Leader, Central Leading Group for Comprehensively Deepening Reforms; 2014–2018: Leader, Leading Group for Coordinating the Joint Development of the Beijing-Tianjin-Hebei Region; 2014–2018: Leader, Leading Group for Advancing the Development of the Yangtze River Delta; 2015–2018: Leader, Leading Group for Advancing the Development of One Belt One Road; 2015–2018: Leader, Leading Group for the Transformation of the State Council

Zhang Gaoli
- Simplified Chinese: 张高丽
- Traditional Chinese: 張高麗
Transcriptions
Standard Mandarin
- Hanyu Pinyin: Zhāng Gāolì
- Wade–Giles: Chang Kao-li
- IPA: [ʈʂáŋ káʊ.lî]
Southern Min
- Hokkien POJ: Tiuⁿ Ko-lē
- Tâi-lô: Tiunn Ko-lē

Zhang Gaoli (Chinese: 张高丽; /dʒɑːŋ ɡaʊˈliː/; born November 1947) is a Chinese retired politician who served as the first-ranking vice premier of China between 2013 and 2018 and as the seventh-ranking member of the Politburo Standing Committee of the Chinese Communist Party (CCP) between 2012 and 2017. Prior to his ascension, Zhang served as the Party Secretary of Tianjin between 2007 and 2012, and the Party Secretary in the Shandong province between 2002 and 2007.

As Premier Li Keqiang's principal lieutenant, Zhang's portfolio spanned the fields of finance, economic development, natural resources, the environment, and housing. He chaired the ad-hoc steering committees overseeing the Three Gorges Dam, the South–North Water Transfer Project, One Belt One Road, and the Commission on Food Safety of the State Council.

On 2 November 2021, Chinese women's tennis player Peng Shuai accused Zhang of sexually assaulting her, and also referred to an extramarital affair between the two from which he had recently walked away. Her subsequent disappearance, censorship, and reappearance sparked concerns about her safety and well-being.

== Life and career ==
=== Early life ===
Zhang was born in a village in Jinjiang County, Fujian, to a family of farmers. He was the youngest of five children. His family was poor. His father died when he was three years old. He and his four siblings were raised almost single-handedly by his mother. As a child, Zhang helped his family with farm work and also caught fish in a neighboring river.

Zhang attended Jinjiang Qiaosheng High School (晋江侨声中学). In 1965, Zhang entered Xiamen University to study economics. After graduating in August 1970, Zhang was sent to an oil company logistics team in Maoming to work as a construction worker, stocking materials in a warehouse and moving concrete blocks.

=== Guangdong ===
In 1984, Zhang was named deputy party secretary of Maoming. This was Zhang's first foray into politics. A year later he was named chair of the Guangdong Economic Commission. By 1988, he became Vice Governor of Guangdong. In 1993, at age 47, he made it onto the provincial Party Standing Committee, becoming one of the top leaders of the province. He also served in roles such as the head of the coordination agency in charge of developing the Pearl River Delta and also the head of the provincial planning agency.

In 1997, Zhang became Party Secretary of Shenzhen. During his time in Shenzhen, Zhang was a strong supporter of the development of Huawei. By the fall of that year, he was an alternate to the 15th Central Committee of the Chinese Communist Party (CCP). In 1998, he was made deputy provincial party secretary of Guangdong while holding onto his municipal leadership position in Shenzhen. He served under then-provincial party secretary Li Changchun and alongside executive vice governor Wang Qishan. During this time, it was said that he received praise from former General Secretary of the Chinese Communist Party Jiang Zemin. He was also said to have frequently visited and tended to the needs of party veteran Xi Zhongxun, the father of current CCP General Secretary Xi Jinping.

=== Shandong and Tianjin ===
In late 2001, Zhang was transferred to the eastern coastal province of Shandong to become governor and deputy provincial party secretary. In 2002, he was promoted to provincial party secretary, the first-in-charge of the province. In Shandong, Zhang told a gathering of assembled local officials, "whether it is my relatives, children, friends; if they go to where you are, please do not go out of your way to receive them, do not carry favour with them, and do not offer to do things for them." This was seen as Zhang trying to send a signal that he intended to distance himself from a political culture rife with corruption and complex rules around guanxi.

Seven months before the 17th CCP National Congress held in October 2007, the central leadership moved Zhang in a provincial leadership reshuffle to become party secretary in the coastal city of Tianjin, succeeded his unpopular predecessor Zhang Lichang. As the party leader of a direct-controlled municipality, Zhang also gained a seat on the Politburo of the Chinese Communist Party. Observers speculated that Zhang would become a member of the "fifth generation" of leadership. In Tianjin Zhang cultivated a low-profile image. While he was seen as a top contender for a seat on the CCP Politburo Standing Committee, along with the regional chiefs of Chongqing and Guangdong, Bo Xilai, and Wang Yang, respectively, Zhang was decidedly less showy and avoided self-promotion. His motto during his term in Tianjin was "do more, speak less."

It was reported that Zhang Gaoli was responsible for promoting the "immature" over-the-counter equity trading platform during his tenure as the Party Secretary of Tianjin. The platform was criticized for opening the door for "social crooks" to conduct financial fraud, causing hundreds of thousands of investors across China to be defrauded, with tens of billions of yuan at stake.

=== First-ranked Vice-Premier ===
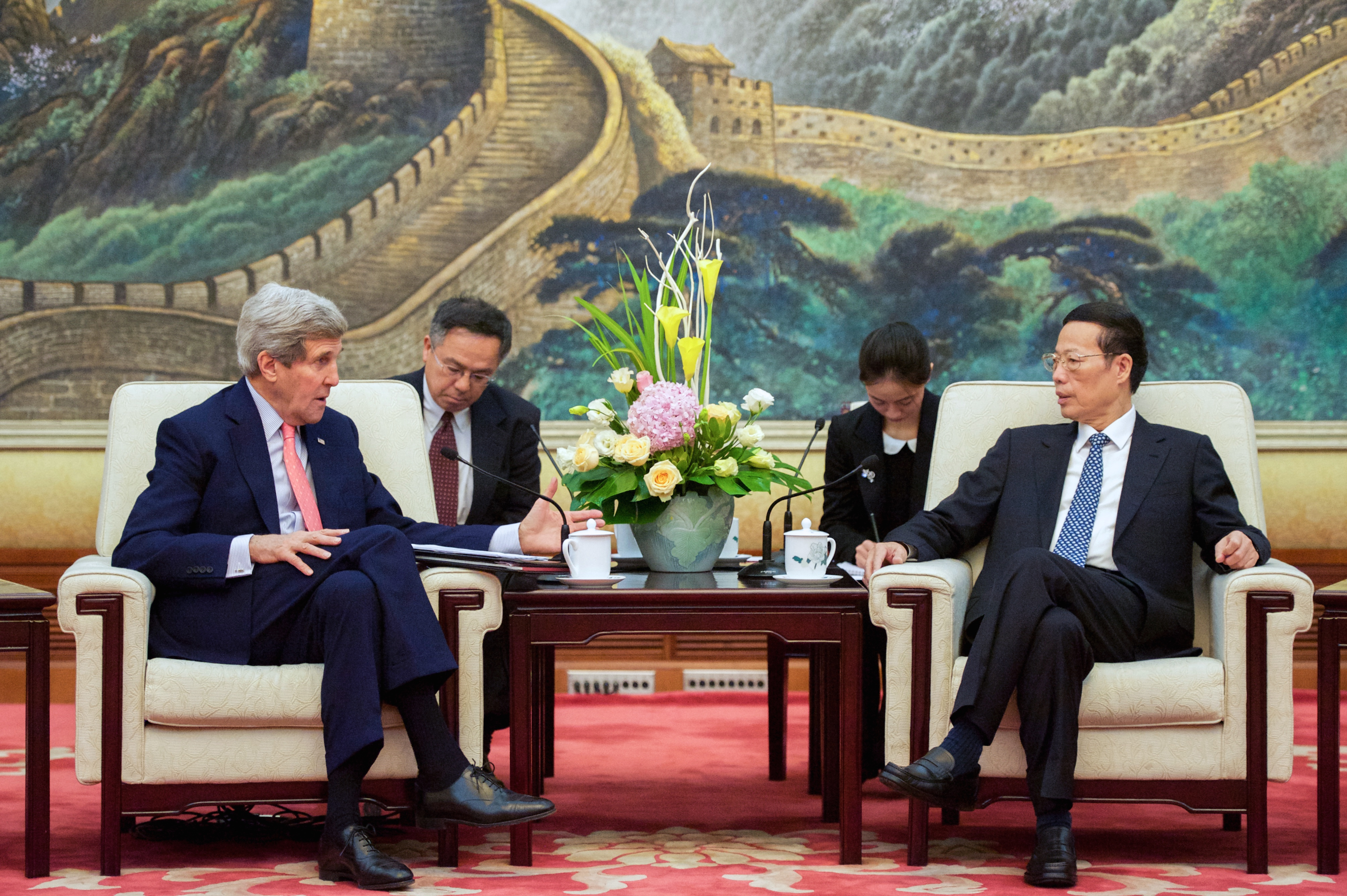
Zhang Gaoli with U.S. Secretary of State John Kerry

After the 18th National Congress of the Chinese Communist Party in 2012, Zhang earned a seat on the CCP Politburo Standing Committee (PSC), China's de facto top ruling council. He was ranked seventh out of seven members. The council had shrunk from nine seats to seven seats at the 18th Party Congress. On 15 March 2013, at the 1st session of the 12th National People's Congress, Zhang was appointed the first-ranking Vice Premier to the cabinet led by Premier Li Keqiang.

He was put in charge of two mega projects, the Three Gorges Dam project, and the South-North Water Transfer Project. He was also named head of the Commission on Food Safety of the State Council. In February 2015, he was named leader of the Leading Group for Advancing the Development of One Belt One Road. He was also named the leader of the Leading Group for Coordinating the Joint Development of the Beijing-Tianjin-Hebei Region, the leader of the Leading Group for Advancing the Development of the Yangtze River Delta, and in April 2015, the leader of the Leading Group for the Transformation of the State Council. He was also the deputy leader of the Central Leading Group for Comprehensively Deepening Reforms, a member of the Leading Group for Financial and Economic Affairs. and the Vice Chairman of the National Energy Commission. Zhang's wide-ranging leadership roles made him a major force in the implementation of the so-called "New Normal" economic policies of Xi Jinping and Li Keqiang.

In discussing the concept of the Chinese Dream as articulated by Xi in 2013, Zhang emphasized that the Chinese Dream also belongs to the millions of disabled people in China.

Zhang retired from the PSC after the 19th CCP National Congress in 2017. He stepped down as first-ranking vice premier in 2018 at the 1st session 13th National People's Congress, and was succeeded by Han Zheng.

== Personal life ==
Zhang is married to Kang Jie (康洁), whom he met while working in the oil company in Maoming. They have one son (born c. 1989) who was, as of 2013, serving in the army as a junior officer. He also has an adopted daughter Zhang Xiaoyan (张晓燕), who is the biological daughter of his cousin or his niece in the rank of cousin lineage (first cousin once removed). Zhang Xiaoyan is married to Li Shengpo (李圣泼), the son of Hong Kong businessman Lee Yin Yee of Xinyi Glass. Li Shengpo, also referred to by his Cantonese name Lee Shing Put, has been named in association with the Panama Papers.

Fujian-based website Straight Consume once published an article that alleged that Zhang's eldest brother had left China and died fighting as part of an insurrection against the government of the Philippines sometime in the 1960s. According to online sources in Fujian, Zhang was said to have cut most ties with his siblings after he ascended to higher positions in the world of politics. When serving in Shenzhen, his elder brother visited him but Zhang was said to have told his brother that he was too busy to see him. State media curiously made no mention of Zhang Xiaoyan while profiling the families of each of the members of the Politburo Standing Committee in 2013, suggesting that Zhang may not have wanted to emphasize any connections he may have had with a Hong Kong tycoon.

== Sexual assault accusation ==
On 2 November 2021, Chinese professional tennis player Peng Shuai took to Weibo to accuse Zhang of sexual assault. Peng said that she first had sex with Zhang in 2011, and that she had been in a consensual extramarital affair with him for several years, until Zhang was appointed to the Politburo Standing Committee of the Chinese Communist Party (CCP) and ceased contact with Peng. She also said that later, about three years ago after Zhang had retired from PSC, she and Zhang met again. Zhang invited her to his home and badgered her to have sex with him. Peng initially refused and wrote that she was "scared", "continuously crying" and "not agreeing", but after Zhang said that he hated her, and that he had never forgotten her in the past seven years, and promised he would be good to her, she agreed to have sex after experiencing fear and panic and her feelings towards him from seven years ago. Peng also said that during the incident another person "stood guard" outside the bedroom door. After the 2018 encounter, Peng became Zhang's mistress and she wrote that she "loved" him and was with him willingly. According to Peng, Zhang had told her that he loved her too but claimed it was politically impossible for him to divorce his wife. The extramarital affair broke down on 2 November 2021, after Zhang started to ignore Peng.

The New York Times reported that this was the first time a member of the top echelons of the CCP faced such allegations, and the WTA Tour called for an investigation of the allegations. During a press conference on 3 November, Wang Wenbin, a Chinese Foreign Ministry spokesman, said he had "not heard of this issue, and it is not a diplomatic question".

Peng's post was censored in China shortly after she made the accusation, and any searches or posts about the topic, even as broad as "tennis", in the country were blocked or removed. Her subsequent disappearance led to worldwide concerns over her whereabouts and safety, to the point the Women's Tennis Association suspended all events in China. Peng showed up in state media two weeks later for appearances that observers believed to have been staged in response to foreign inquiries. E-mails and interview publications have depicted her denying that she made the accusation of sexual assault.

Government offices
Preceded by Li Keqiang	First-ranked Vice-Premier of the State Council; 2013–2018	Succeeded by Han Zheng
Preceded by Li Chunting	Governor of Shandong; 2001–2003	Succeeded by Han Yuqun
Assembly seats
Preceded by Han Xikai	Chairperson of People's Congress of Shandong; 2003–2007	Succeeded by Li Jianguo
Party political offices
Preceded by Wu Guanzheng	Party Secretary of Shandong; 2002–2007	Succeeded by Li Jianguo
Preceded by Zhang Lichang	Party Secretary of Tianjin; 2007–2012	Succeeded by Sun Chunlan
