= Huang Huoqing =

Chinese politician

- 黄火青

Procurator-General of the Supreme People's Procuratorate
- In office 5 March 1978 – 20 June 1983
- Preceded by: Zhang Dingcheng
- Succeeded by: Yang Yichen

Party Secretary of Liaoning
- In office June 1958 – January 1971
- Preceded by: Huang Oudong
- Succeeded by: Chen Xilian

Party Secretary of Tianjin
- In office April 1953 – June 1958
- Preceded by: Huang Jing
- Succeeded by: Wan Xiaotang

Mayor of Tianjin
- In office 21 January 1955 – 4 July 1958
- Preceded by: Wu De
- Succeeded by: Li Gengtao

Personal details
- Born: June 20, 1901 Xinshi, Hubei, Qing China
- Died: 9 November 1999 (aged 98) Beijing, China
- Party: Chinese Communist Party

Chinese name
- Simplified Chinese: 黄火青
- Traditional Chinese: 黃火青
Transcriptions
Standard Mandarin
- Hanyu Pinyin: Huáng Huǒqīng

Huang Huoqing (Chinese: 黄火青; pinyin: Huáng Huǒqīng; 1901 – November 9, 1999) was a politician of the People's Republic of China.

== Biography ==
Huang Huoqing was born in Zaoyang County, Hubei in 1901. He joined the Chinese Communist Party (CCP) in 1926.

After the foundation of the People's Republic of China, Huang was the Secretary of the Tianjin Municipal Committee of the CCP from 1953 to 1958, and the CCP Liaoning Committee from 1958 to 1971.

Huang was the Procurator-General of the Supreme People's Procuratorate from 1978 to 1983, the first person to hold the post since the Cultural Revolution.

Political offices
Preceded by Huang Jing	Party Secretary of Tianjin; 1953–1958	Succeeded by Wan Xiaotang
Preceded by Wu De	Mayor of Tianjin; 1955–1958	Succeeded by Li Gengtao
Preceded by	Chairman of the CPPCC Tianjin Committee; 1955–1960	Succeeded by Wan Xiaotang
Preceded by Huang Oudong	Party Secretary of Liaoning; 1958–1971	Succeeded by Chen Xilian
Preceded by Huang Oudong	Chairman of Liaoning CPPCC; 1959–1967	Succeeded by Huang Oudong
Preceded by Zhang Dingcheng	Procurator-General of the Supreme People's Procuratorate; 1978–1983	Succeeded by Yang Yichen
