= Wang Xugao =

Chinese politician (1890–1951)

Wang Xugao (traditional Chinese: 王緒高; simplified Chinese: 王绪高; pinyin: Wáng Xùgāo; Wade-Giles: Wang Hsu-kao) (1890–1951) was a politician in the Republic of China. He was an important politician during the Provisional Government of the Republic of China and the Wang Jingwei regime (Republic of China-Nanjing). He was born in Penglai, Shandong.

== Biography ==
He graduated from Beiyang Police High School and after that successively held governorships of several counties in Zhili. After Kuomintang's Northern Expedition, Wang Xugao was appointed a secretary to the Hebei provincial government.

In December 1937, the Provisional Government of the Republic of China was established. Wang Xugao participated in it, and was appointed Governor of Jinhaidao (津海道). In March 1940, the Wang Jingwei regime was established and Wang stayed in his former post. In February 1943, he was appointed acting Chief to the Civil Administration Agency of the Hebei provincial government. In the following month, he also held the position of Mayor of Tianjin Special City. That October, he resigned from both positions.

After the Wang Jinwei regime collapsed, Wang Xugao was arrested by Chiang Kai-shek's National Government. In 1951, he was executed by authority of People's Republic of China.
