= Nie Bichu =

Chinese politician

- 聂璧初

Chairman of Tianjin Municipal People's Congress
- In office June 1993 – 1998
- Preceded by: Wu Zhen
- Succeeded by: Zhang Lichang

Acting Party Secretary of Tianjin
- In office February 1993 – March 1993
- Preceded by: Tan Shaowen
- Succeeded by: Gao Dezhan

Mayor of Tianjin
- In office October 1989 – 20 June 1993
- Preceded by: Li Ruihuan
- Succeeded by: Zhang Lichang

Personal details
- Born: 2 January 1928 Tianjin, China
- Died: 20 April 2018 (aged 90) Tianjin, China
- Party: Chinese Communist Party
- Education: Peiyang University

Chinese name
- Simplified Chinese: 聂璧初
- Traditional Chinese: 聶璧初
Transcriptions
Standard Mandarin
- Hanyu Pinyin: Niè Bìchū

Nie Bichu (simplified Chinese: 聂璧初; traditional Chinese: 聶璧初; 2 January 1928 – 20 April 2018) was a Chinese politician. He served as the mayor and acting Party Secretary of Tianjin.

== Biography ==
Nie was born in Tianjin in 1928, with his ancestral home in Taoyuan County, Hunan. He studied at Yaohua School in Tianjin from 1935 to 1946, and graduated from Beiyang University (now Tianjin University) in 1950. He had four siblings, two of whom died early. He joined the Chinese Communist Party in 1948 and was a member of its 13th Central Committee.

Nie served as mayor of Tianjin from October 1989 to June 1993 and chairman of Tianjin Municipal People's Congress from June 1993 to May 1998. When Tan Shaowen, Party Secretary of Tianjin, died in February 1993, Nie served as acting CCP Committee Secretary for a month before Gao Dezhan was appointed Tan's replacement. In the early 1990s, he successfully lobbied the central government to allow Tianjin to implement housing reform after the example of Shanghai.

Nie died on 20 April 2018 at the age of 90.

== See also ==
- Politics of Tianjin

Government offices
Preceded by Li Ruihuan	Mayor of Tianjin; 1989–1993	Succeeded by Zhang Lichang
Party political offices
Preceded by Tan Shaowen	Acting Party Secretary of Tianjin; 1993	Succeeded by Gao Dezhan
Assembly seats
Preceded by Wu Zhen	Chairman of Tianjin Municipal People's Congress; 1993–1998	Succeeded by Zhang Lichang
