= Gao Dezhan =

Chinese politician (1932–2026)

- 高德占

Governor of Jilin
- In office 1987–1993
- Preceded by: Zhao Xiu
- Succeeded by: He Zhukang

Chinese Communist Party Committee Secretary of Tianjin
- In office 1987–1993

Personal details
- Born: August 1932 Qixia, Shandong, China
- Died: 18 January 2026 (aged 93)
- Party: Chinese Communist Party
- Education: Dalian University of Technology

Gao Dezhan (Chinese: 高德占; August 1932 – 18 January 2026) was a Chinese politician.

== Life and career ==
Gao was born in Qixia, Shandong in August 1932. He was a graduate of Dalian University of Technology. He was governor of Jilin and Chinese Communist Party Committee Secretary of Tianjin. He was an alternate member of the 12th Central Committee of the Chinese Communist Party and the 13th Central Committee of the Chinese Communist Party and a full member of the 14th Central Committee of the Chinese Communist Party. He was a member of the 9th Standing Committee of the National People's Congress. He was Director of the State Forestry Administration of the People's Republic of China (1987–1993).

Gao died on 18 January 2026, at the age of 93.

Preceded by Yang Zhong	Director of the State Forestry Administration of the People's Republic of China; 1987–1993	Succeeded by Xu Youfang
Preceded by Zhao Xiu	Governor of Jilin	Succeeded by He Zhukang
Preceded by Nie Bichu	Communist Party Chief of Tianjin	Succeeded by Zhang Lichang
