= Wu De =

Chinese politician (1913–1995)

- 吴德

Chairman of the Beijing Revolutionary Committee
- In office 1972–1978
- Preceded by: Xie Fuzhi
- Succeeded by: Lin Hujia

Vice Chairperson of the Standing Committee of the National People's Congress
- In office 17 January 1975 – 16 April 1980

Personal details
- Born: 5 February 1913
- Died: 29 November 1995 (aged 82) Beijing, China
- Party: Chinese Communist Party (1931–1972)

Military service
- Allegiance: People's Republic of China

Wu De (Chinese: 吴德; pinyin: Wú Dé; Wade–Giles: Wu Teh; February 5, 1913 – November 29, 1995), born Li Chunhua (李春华), was a Chinese Communist revolutionary and politician of the People's Republic of China. He served in provincial-level leadership positions in Pingyuan Province, Tianjin municipality, Jilin Province, and Beijing municipality, and was a member of the Politburo of the Chinese Communist Party from 1973 to 1980. After the Cultural Revolution, Wu was a key supporter of Hua Guofeng and was forced out of politics after Deng Xiaoping ousted Hua from his leadership position.

== Communist revolution ==
Wu joined the Chinese Communist Party in 1933, and organized strikes and other workers' actions in the Tangshan area. After the eruption of the Second Sino-Japanese War, he organized the Hebei Anti-Japanese Army, committing it to guerrilla warfare in the northern regions. In 1940 he was appointed head of a working commission under the Central Committee of the Chinese Communist Party to oversee activity behind enemy lines. After the Chinese Civil War, he served as Party secretary for Tangshan.

== Early PRC ==
After the Proclamation of the People's Republic of China in October 1949, Wu De briefly served as Vice Minister of Fuel Industry of the newly established government. He became the Communist Party Chief of Pingyuan Province in 1950, replacing Pan Fusheng, who had been demoted. After Pingyuan Province was abolished in 1952, Wu De was transferred to Tianjin, where he served as Vice Mayor and then Mayor from 1952 to 1955. Afterwards he was appointed the party chief (then called First Secretary) of Jilin Province.

== Cultural Revolution ==
Wu served in this position until the Cultural Revolution started in 1966. As Mao Zedong insisted that the Beijing Municipal Committee needed to be reorganized without Peng Zhen, who contested the policies of the Cultural Revolution, on June 4 the Central Committee transferred Wu De to the capital as second secretary of the CCP Municipal Committee, ranking immediately beneath First Secretary Li Xuefeng. During their leadership, the two of them ordered the suspension of classes of Beijing universities to allow students to fully concentrate on the Cultural Revolution. In 1967 he became a vice-chairman of the Beijing Revolutionary Committee, and was elected member of the CCP Central Committee in 1969.

As Mao Zedong clashed with Lin Biao and Chen Boda at the Central Committee plenum held in Lushan in 1970, Wu De advised him to act swiftly in order to avoid trouble within the People's Liberation Army. He said: "The Chairman must act personally ... believing in the possibility to enlighten a lot of people united under the great leader Chairman Mao." From this moment on, Mao praised Wu De, calling him "virtuous" (playing on Wu De's first name, whose character 德 means "virtue"). Lin's death in the air crash following his attempted coup in 1971 enforced Wu's position. He was proclaimed head of the Cultural Group Under the State Council, a sort of temporary Minister of Culture.

After Xie Fuzhi's death in 1972, Wu De took over as chairman of the Beijing Revolutionary Committee and concurrently first secretary of the CCP Beijing Committee. In 1973 he was admitted into the CCP Politburo. He took active part at the "Criticize Lin Biao, Criticize Confucius" campaign, but Jiang Qing, believing he wanted to mislead the movement, criticized him, bringing forth his hostility towards the Gang of Four.

In 1975, he was a vice-chairman of the Standing Committee of the National People's Congress (NPC).

Wu De actively struggled against a rehabilitated Deng Xiaoping and worked to promote Hua Guofeng as Mao's successor. He advocated repression of the 1976 Tiananmen Incident, earning the ironic nickname of "no virtue," (无德) a pun on his name. In October of the same year, he played a role in the arrest of the Gang of Four.

== Downfall under Deng Xiaoping ==
The rise of Deng Xiaoping and the ouster of the Gang of Four marked the beginning of a repudiation of the Cultural Revolution. Though initially an important part of Hua Guofeng's leadership, Wu De was openly criticized at the Third Plenary Session of the 11th CCP Central Committee and lost his Politburo seat. In 1980, along with Chen Xilian and other Maoists, he was purged and resigned his post in the NPC Standing Committee.

Despite his participation to the Cultural Revolution, his role in removing the Gang of Four earned him a powerless position in the Central Advisory Commission by Hu Yaobang and Wan Li's suggestions. He died in Beijing in 1995.

Political offices
Preceded by Pan Fusheng	Party Secretary of Pingyuan; 1950–1952	Province abolished
Preceded by Huang Jing	Mayor of Tianjin; 1953–1955	Succeeded by Huang Huoqing
Preceded by Li Mengling	Party Secretary of Jilin; 1955–1966	Succeeded by Zhao Lin
Preceded by Peng Zhen	Mayor of Beijing; Acting; 1966–1967	Succeeded by Xie Fuzhi as Chairman of the Beijing Revolutionary Committee
Preceded by Xiao Wangdong as Minister of Culture	Head of the Cultural Group Under the PRC State Council; 1970–1975	Succeeded by Yu Huiyong as Minister of Culture
Preceded by Xie Fuzhi	Chairman of the Beijing Revolutionary Committee; 1972–1978	Succeeded by Lin Hujia
