= Hu Zhaoheng =

Chinese politician

Hu Zhaoheng (Chinese: 胡昭衡) (1915–1999) original name Li Xin (Chinese: 李欣), was a politician of the People's Republic of China. He was born in Xingyang, Henan (at the time Xingyang County). He participated in the December 9th Movement of 1935 and later the 120th Division, 358th Brigade of the Eighth Route Army. During the Chinese Civil War, he was active in Northeast China and Inner Mongolia. He was mayor of Tianjin and a delegate to the 3rd National People's Congress. He also worked at the Ministry of Health of the People's Republic of China as a vice-minister.

Preceded by Li Gengtao	Mayor of Tianjin	Succeeded by Xie Xuegong
