= Chen Weida =

Chinese politician and educator

Chen Weida (Chinese: 陈伟达; pinyin: Chén Wěidá; March 1916 – 1990) was a Chinese politician and educator.

== Biography ==
Chen Weida was born in Xiangshui County, Jiangsu in 1916. He joined the Chinese Communist Party (CCP) in 1937.

After the foundation of the People's Republic of China, Chen Weida had been the Secretary of the CCP Hangzhou Committee, the First Secretary of the CCP Tianjin Committee, and the Deputy Secretary of the CCP's Central Political and Legislative Affairs Committee.

Chen was the President of Zhejiang University from 1962 to 1968.

Educational offices
Preceded by Zhou Rongxin	President of Zhejiang University; 1962–1968	Succeeded by Qian Sanqiang
Government offices
Preceded by Lin Hujia	Mayor of Tianjin; 1978–1980	Succeeded by Hu Qili
Party political offices
Preceded by Lin Hujia	Communist Party Secretary of Tianjin; 1978–1984	Succeeded by Ni Zhifu
Military offices
Preceded by Lin Hujia	Political Commissar of the Tianjin Garrison Command; 1978–1984	Succeeded by Ni Zhifu
