= Dai Xianglong =

Chinese politician

- 戴相龙
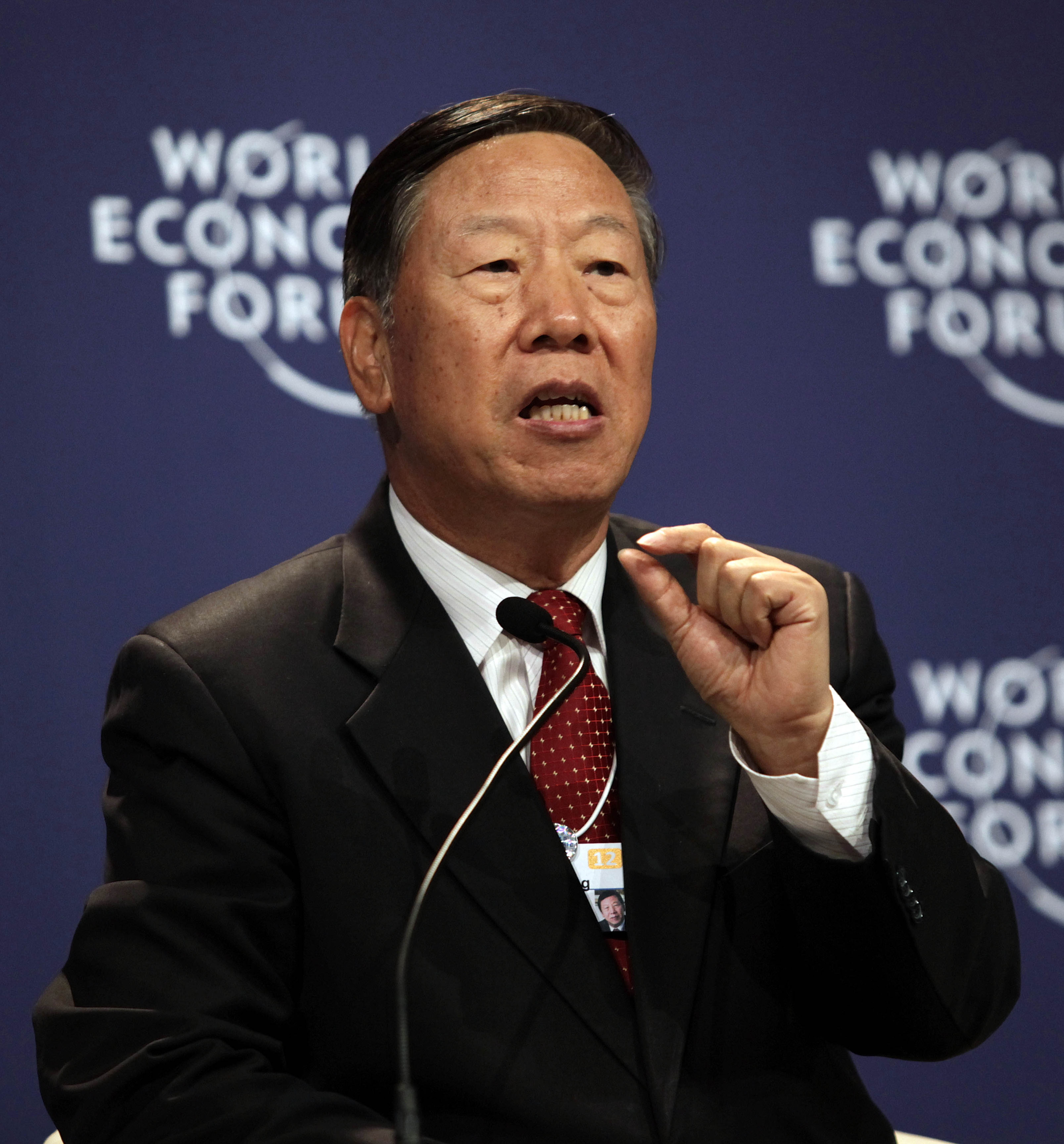
- Dai at the World Economic Forum Annual Meeting of the New Champions in 2012

Chairman of the National Council for Social Security Fund
- In office 30 January 2008 – 19 March 2013
- Premier: Wen Jiabao
- Preceded by: Xiang Huaicheng
- Succeeded by: Xie Xuren

Governor of the People's Bank of China
- In office 30 June 1995 – 28 December 2002
- Premier: Zhu Rongji
- Preceded by: Zhu Rongji
- Succeeded by: Zhou Xiaochuan

Mayor of Tianjin
- In office 30 December 2002 – 28 December 2007
- Preceded by: Li Shenglin
- Succeeded by: Huang Xingguo

Personal details
- Born: 1 October 1944 (age 81) Yizheng, Jiangsu, Republic of China
- Party: Chinese Communist Party (1973–present)
- Education: Central University of Finance and Economics

Dai Xianglong (simplified Chinese: 戴相龙; traditional Chinese: 戴相龍; pinyin: Dài Xiànglóng; born 1 October 1944) is a Chinese politician. He is the former governor of the People's Bank of China, and the former mayor of Tianjin. He currently serves as the president and Chinese Communist Party (CCP) party chief of the National Council for Social Security Fund.

== Biography ==
Born in Yizheng, Jiangsu Province, Dai graduated from the department of accounting of the Central Institute of Finance and Economics (now the Central University of Finance and Economics), majoring in financial accounting. He joined the Chinese Communist Party in May 1973.

After graduation, he served as an accountant at the finance office of the Guishan Coal Mine in Yunnan, an official in its propaganda office, vice secretary of the CCP committee at the second industrial zone, and an official at the political department of the Coal Industrial Bureau in Yunnan. Later, he moved to Jiangsu and became an official of the Agricultural Bank of China Jiangsu Branch, vice director of its appropriation office, vice mayor of Feng County of Jiangsu, and vice governor of the Agricultural Bank of China Jiangsu Branch. From 1985 to 1995, he served as vice governor of the Agricultural Bank of China, general manager, vice president and CCP party chief of the Bank of Communications, and vice governor and deputy party chief of the People's Bank of China.

He was appointed as governor and CCP party chief of the People's Bank of China in June 1995. Since then, he has become well recognized. In June 2001, he was additionally appointed as vice secretary of the central finance commission. During his tenure as governor of China's central bank, Dai presided over 9 consecutive interest rate reductions, earning him the nickname of "governor who lowers the interest rate".

In December 2002, he was appointed vice secretary of the CCP Tianjin municipal committee, and vice mayor and acting mayor of Tianjin. He was confirmed as mayor in January 2003. On December 28, 2007, Dai resigned as mayor of Tianjin, and vice mayor Huang Xingguo succeeded him in this post. The secretary of the CCP Tianjin committee, Zhang Gaoli, commented on Dai Xianglong, "Dai was very devoted to the fast development of Tianjin. He had great passion for the officials and people of Tianjin. The people of Tianjin won't forget his contributions......".

On January 30, 2008, the State Council appointed Dai as the president and party chief of the National Council for Social Security Fund, in charge of the national fund of 740 billion RMB (yuan).

Dai is a senior economist and a research fellow. He was an alternate member of the 14th Central Committee of the Chinese Communist Party, and a full member of the 15th, 16th and 17th Central Committees.

Government offices
Preceded by Zhu Rongji	Governor of the People's Bank of China; 1995–2002	Succeeded by Zhou Xiaochuan
Political offices
Preceded by Li Shenglin	Mayor of Tianjin; 2002–2007	Succeeded by Huang Xingguo
