= Lin Hujia =

Chinese politician (1916–2018)

- Chinese: 林乎加

Minister of Agriculture
- In office February 1981 – May 1982
- Preceded by: Yang Lizhi
- Succeeded by: Office abolished

Minister of Agriculture, Animal Husbandry and Fisheries
- In office May 1982 – June 1983
- Preceded by: Office established
- Succeeded by: He Kang

Mayor of Beijing
- In office December 1979 – February 1981
- Preceded by: Wu De
- Succeeded by: Jiao Ruoyu

Communist Party Secretary of Beijing
- In office October 1978 – February 1981
- Preceded by: Wu De
- Succeeded by: Duan Junyi

Communist Party Secretary of Tianjin
- In office June 1978 – October 1978
- Preceded by: Chen Weida
- Succeeded by: Li Ruihuan

Communist Party Secretary of Shanghai
- In office January 1977 – June 1978
- Preceded by: Ma Tianshui
- Succeeded by: Su Zhenhua

Personal details
- Born: December 1916 Penglai, Shandong, China
- Died: September 13, 2018 (aged 101) Beijing, China
- Party: Chinese Communist Party (since February 1938)
- Education: High school

Lin Hujia (Chinese: 林乎加; pinyin: Lín Hūjiā; December 1916 – 13 September 2018) was a Chinese politician. He was born in Changdao County, Shandong Province. He was mayor and communist party chief of Beijing and Tianjin. He was Minister of Agriculture (1981–1982). Lin died in 2018 at the age of 101.

== Biography ==
Lin was born in Penglai, Shandong, in December 1916. He joined the National Liberation Vanguard Corps in 1936 and began revolutionary work in December 1937. He became a member of the Chinese Communist Party in February 1938.

During the Second Sino-Japanese War, Lin served with the Third Army of the Shandong People's Anti-Japanese National Salvation Army and later with the Eighth Route Army's Shandong Column, where he held political positions including director of the political department. Beginning in 1940, he served as head of the propaganda departments of the CCP's Lunan and Luzhong regional committees. In 1943, he was appointed secretary of the CCP Tai'an Prefectural Committee and concurrently political commissar of the local military subdistrict.

Following the establishment of the People's Republic of China in 1949, Lin was transferred to Zhejiang, where he served as a member of the Standing Committee of the Chinese Communist Party Zhejiang Provincial Committee. He subsequently held a number of senior provincial posts, including deputy head of the provincial publicity department, deputy head of the provincial rural work department, head of the provincial publicity department, secretary-general of the provincial committee, and, from August 1955, deputy secretary of the Zhejiang Provincial Committee and secretary of its Secretariat.

During the Cultural Revolution, Lin was persecuted and removed from office. He returned to public service in 1972 as vice chairman of the Revolutionary Committee of the State Planning Commission and a member of its leading party group, serving until 1977. In January 1977, Lin was appointed Communist Party Secretary of Shanghai. In June 1978, he became First Secretary of the CCP Tianjin Municipal Committee, before being transferred in October of the same year to serve as First Secretary of the CCP Beijing Municipal Committee and chairman of the Beijing Revolutionary Committee. In December 1979, he concurrently assumed the office of Mayor of Beijing, serving until February 1981.

In February 1981, Lin was appointed Minister of Agriculture and secretary of the ministry's party leadership group. Following the reorganization of the ministry in May 1982, he became the inaugural Minister of Agriculture, Animal Husbandry and Fisheries, remaining in office until June 1983. He subsequently served as an adviser to the ministry until 1988. During his final year in government service, he also served as deputy head of the State Council Leading Group for the "Three West" (3-Xi) Development Program. Lin died in Beijing on September 13, 2018, at the age of 101.

Party political offices
| Preceded by Xie Xuegong | Party Secretary of Tianjin; 1977–1978 | Succeeded by Chen Weida |
| Preceded by Wu De | Party Secretary of Beijing; 1978–1981 | Succeeded by Duan Junyi |
Government offices
| Preceded by Wu De | Mayor of Beijing; 1978–1981 | Succeeded by Jiao Ruoyu |
| Preceded by Huo Shilian | Minister of Agriculture; 1981–1982 | Succeeded by Position revoked |
| New title | Minister of Agriculture, Animal Husbandry and Fisheries; 1982–1983 | Succeeded by He Kang |
Military offices
| Preceded by Xie Xuegong | Political commissar of the Tianjin Garrison Command; 1978 | Succeeded by Chen Weida |
