= Ni Zhifu =

Chinese politician (1933–2013)

- 倪志福
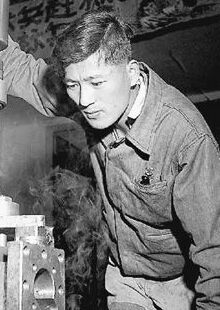

Chairman of the All-China Federation of Trade Unions
- In office October 1978 – October 1993
- Preceded by: Liu Ningyi
- Succeeded by: Wei Jianxing

Party Secretary of Tianjin
- In office October 1984 – August 1987
- Preceded by: Chen Weida
- Succeeded by: Li Ruihuan

Personal details
- Born: May 1933 Shanghai, China
- Died: 24 April 2013 (aged 79) Beijing
- Party: Chinese Communist Party

Ni Zhifu (Chinese: 倪志福; Wade–Giles: Ni Chih-fu; May 1933 – 24 April 2013) was a Chinese engineer, inventor, and high-ranking politician. When he worked as a technician in the 1950s, he invented the "Ni Zhifu drill" which earned him a patent and the honour of "model worker". During the Cultural Revolution, he was elevated to leadership positions in the municipal government of Beijing and became an alternate member of the Politburo. He was not close to the Gang of Four, and for that reason his career continued to rise when the Gang fell at the end of the Cultural Revolution in 1976. He became a full member of the Politburo, and served as Chinese Communist Party Deputy Committee Secretary of Shanghai municipality, Chairman of the All-China Federation of Trade Unions, Party Chief of Tianjin municipality, and Vice Chairman of the National People's Congress.

== Early life and invention ==
Ni Zhifu was born in Shanghai in May 1933, and became an apprentice at Shanghai Detai Factory in 1950. In June 1953 he was transferred to the state-owned 618 Factory (also known as Yongding Machinery Plant) in Beijing to work as a fitter. While at the factory he invented the "Ni Zhifu drill", which greatly enhanced the performance and life of drills, and for which he was later granted a patent. He joined the Chinese Communist Party in 1958 and was named a national "model worker" in 1959. He was promoted to deputy chief engineer of the 618 Factory in 1965, and later chief engineer.

== Cultural Revolution ==
Ni was a major beneficiary of the Cultural Revolution, but unlike many supporters of the Gang of Four, he owed his rise to prominence to his contribution to production. In 1969, Ni became a member of the 9th Central Committee of the CCP, and in 1973, when a third of the 10th Central Committee were workers and peasants, Ni became an alternate member of the 10th Politburo, one of the four people representing the "masses" in the Politburo. He also served as a party secretary and a deputy director of the Revolutionary Committee of Beijing from 1973 to 1976. He was believed to be closer to the Communist Party bureaucrats than the Gang of Four, and likely tried to check the influence of the Gang in the capital's militia and trade union, which were both under his charge.

== Post-Cultural Revolution ==
When the Gang of Four fell at the end of the Cultural Revolution in 1976, Ni was sent to Shanghai to take over the city's militia and trade union, which had been under the control of Wang Hongwen, one of the Four. He was also made the Second Party Secretary (deputy party chief) of Shanghai. He was then transferred back to Beijing in 1977 to serve as the capital's Second Party Secretary. That same year, Ni, 44, was elected as a full member of the 11th Politburo.

At the Ninth Trade Union Congress in 1978, Ni was elected as chairman of the All-China Federation of Trade Unions (ACFTU), which was seen as a striking change partly because of Ni's relatively young age. He served as the ACFTU chairman for three consecutive terms until 1993, and was re-elected to the 12th Politburo in 1982. From October 1984 to August 1987 he concurrently served as Party Chief of the municipality of Tianjin. From 1988 to 1998 he served as a Vice Chairperson of the National People's Congress. In 1999 he became President of the Chinese Inventors' Association, which he had cofounded in 1985. He was elected to the CCP Central Committee for seven consecutive terms, from the 9th CC in 1969 until the end of the 15th CC in 2002.

On 24 April 2013, Ni died in Beijing of an illness. He was 79.

Military offices
| Preceded by Di Zicai | President of All China Federation of Trade Unions Cadre School; 1978–? | Succeeded by Gu Dachun |
Non-profit organization positions
| Preceded by Liu Ningyi | President of the All-China Federation of Trade Unions; 1978–1993 | Succeeded by Wei Jianxing |
| New title | First Secretary of the Secretariat of the All-China Federation of Trade Unions; 1983–1988 | Succeeded by Zhu Houze |
| Preceded by Wu Heng | President of the China Association of Inventions; 1999–2005 | Succeeded by Zhu Lilan |
Party political offices
| Preceded by Chen Weida | Party Secretary of Tianjin; 1984–1987 | Succeeded by Li Ruihuan |
Military offices
| Preceded by Chen Weida | Political Commissar of the Tianjin Garrison Command; 1984–1987 | Succeeded by Lan Baojing |
Assembly seats
| Preceded by Liao Hansheng | Chairperson of the Credentials Committee of the Standing Committee of the National People's Congress; 1988–1993 | Succeeded by Meng Liankun |
