= Zhang Gong (politician) =

Chinese politician (born 1961)

- 张工
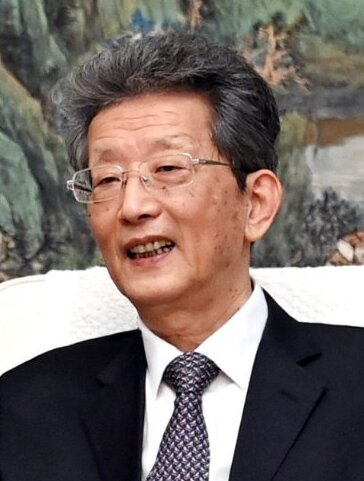
- Zhang meeting US Ambassador David Perdue in September 2025

Mayor of Tianjin
- Incumbent
- Assumed office 31 May 2022; Acting until 6 July 2022
- Party Secretary: Li Hongzhong; Chen Min'er
- Preceded by: Liao Guoxun

Director of the State Administration for Market Regulation
- In office 12 August 2020 – 31 May 2022
- Premier: Li Keqiang
- Preceded by: Xiao Yaqing
- Succeeded by: Luo Wen

Personal details
- Born: August 1961 (age 65) Beijing, China
- Party: Chinese Communist Party
- Education: Beijing University of Technology; Capital University of Economics and Business

Chinese name
- Simplified Chinese: 张工
- Traditional Chinese: 張工
Transcriptions
Standard Mandarin
- Hanyu Pinyin: Zhāng Gōng

Zhang Gong (Chinese: 张工; born August 1961) is a Chinese politician who is the current mayor of Tianjin, in office since 31 May 2022. Previously he served as director of the State Administration for Market Regulation.

He was a delegate to the 11th and is a delegate to the 13th National People's Congress. He was an alternate of the 19th Central Committee of the Chinese Communist Party.

== Early life and education ==
Zhang was born in Beijing, in August 1961. After resuming the college entrance examination in 1979, he was accepted to Beijing University of Technology, majoring in electrical machines.

After graduating in 1983, he was assigned to Beijing Electric Appliance Research Institute, where he moved up the ranks to become deputy director in May 1993 and director in February 1994. Since 1998, he briefly worked as senior executive at Beijing Transformer Factory, Beijing Electromechanical Industry Holding (Group) Co., Ltd., and Beijing Jingcheng Electromechanical Holding Co., Ltd.

== Career in Beijing ==
Zhang joined the Chinese Communist Party (CCP) in April 1992, and got involved in politics in July 2002, when he was appointed deputy director of Beijing Municipal Economic Commission (later reshuffled as Beijing Municipal Development and Reform Commission in 2003), and director in March 2007. He was made vice mayor of Beijing in September 2012 and in April 2015 was admitted to member of the Standing Committee of the CCP Beijing Provincial Committee, the city's top authority. He also served as party secretary of Beijing SASAC from March 2013 to April 2015 and secretary-general of CCP Beijing Municipal Committee from April 2015 to June 2017. He was vice president and deputy party branch secretary of All-China Federation of Trade Unions and secretary of the secretariat in October 2018, and held those offices until July 2020, when he was named party branch secretary of the State Administration for Market Regulation.

== Career in Tianjin ==
In May 2022, he was appointed deputy party secretary of Tianjin. On 31 May, he was named acting mayor, succeeding Liao Guoxun, who died of a sudden illness in office at the age of 59.

Government offices
Preceded by Ding Xiangyang	Director of Beijing Municipal Development and Reform Commission; 2007–2013	Succeeded by Zhang Jiandong
Preceded by Li Shixiang	Executive Vice Mayor of Beijing; 2017–2018	Succeeded by Lin Keqing
Preceded by Xiao Yaqing	Director of the State Administration for Market Regulation; 2020–2022	Succeeded by Luo Wen
Preceded by Liao Guoxun	Mayor of Tianjin; 2022–present	Incumbent
Party political offices
Preceded by Zhao Fengtong	Secretary-General of Beijing Municipal Committee of the Chinese Communist Party; 2015–2017	Succeeded by Cui Shuqiang
Preceded by Deng Kai	Deputy Party Branch Secretary of All-China Federation of Trade Unions; 2018–2020	Vacant
