= Huang Jing =

Chinese communist revolutionary (1912–1958)

- 黄敬
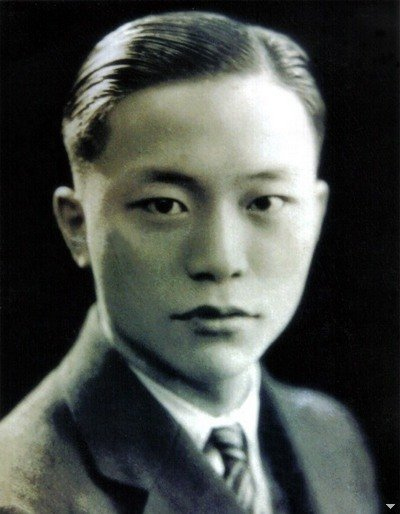
- Huang in the 1930s

Party Secretary of Tianjin
- In office June 1949 – April 1952
- Preceded by: Huang Kecheng
- Succeeded by: Huang Huoqing

Mayor of Tianjin
- In office August 1949 – August 1952
- Succeeded by: Wu De

Personal details
- Born: 1912 Shaoxing, Zhejiang, China
- Died: 10 February 1958 (aged 45–46) Guangzhou, Guangdong, People's Republic of China
- Party: Chinese Communist Party
- Spouse(s): Li Yunhe (Jiang Qing); Fan Jin
- Children: Yu Qiangsheng; Yu Zhengsheng
- Education: Shandong University; Peking University

Huang Jing (Chinese: 黄敬; Wade–Giles: Huang Ching; 1912 – 10 February 1958), born Yu Qiwei (Chinese: 俞启威; Wade–Giles: Yü Ch'i-wei), was a Chinese Communist revolutionary and politician who served as Mayor and Communist Party Chief of Tianjin municipality, Minister of the First Ministry of Machine Building, and Chairman of the National Technological Commission. He was an ex-husband of Jiang Qing, who later married Mao Zedong, and the father of Yu Qiangsheng, a top Chinese intelligence officer who defected to the United States in 1985, and Yu Zhengsheng, the fourth-ranked member of the 18th Politburo Standing Committee.

== Early life and revolution ==
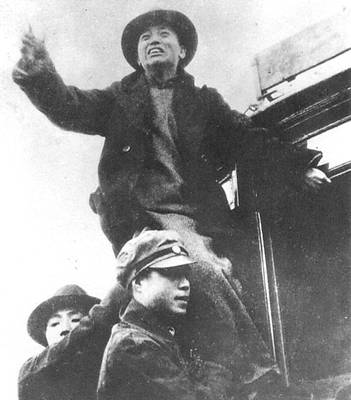
Huang Jing making a speech from a tram during the December 9th Movement in 1935

Yu Qiwei was born in 1912 to a prominent family in Shaoxing, Zhejiang Province. His uncle Yu Ta-wei later served as Minister of National Defense of the Republic of China on Taiwan. The chemist Zeng Zhaolun was also his uncle. Yu enrolled in Shandong University in Qingdao, majoring in physics. At the same time, he spent significant amount of time in underground political activism for the Chinese Communist Party.

While in Qingdao, Huang Jing met and married Li Yunhe (who would later change her name to "Jiang Qing" and marry Mao Zedong), in 1932. Huang introduced the 19-year-old Li to join the Communist Party in 1933. Soon afterwards, Huang was arrested by the government for his Communist activism. To avoid implicating Li, he sent a message asking her to leave him. Li was introduced to Shanghai film director Shi Dongshan, who was in Qingdao at the time, and followed Shi to Shanghai. After Huang's release in 1934, he lived with Li for a while with his family in Shanghai. However, Huang's family was adamantly against their marriage, and they became separated.

In 1935, Huang Jing, then attending Peking University, co-led the December 9th Movement with Yao Yilin and Huang Hua, demanding the Chinese government to actively resist Japanese aggression in the aftermath of the Mukden Incident.

After the Japanese invasion of China in 1937, Huang moved to the Communist base in Yan'an in winter 1939. Li Yunhe, now known as Jiang Qing, had also moved to Yan'an and married the Communist leader Mao Zedong. Huang later became a department head in the Communist bases in Shanxi-Chahar-Hebei (Jin-Cha-Ji) and Shanxi-Hebei-Shandong-Henan (Jin-Ji-Lu-Yu) border areas.

== Political career ==
Following the surrender of Japan in 1945, the Communists took over northern Hebei Province, and Huang was appointed Mayor of Zhangjiakou. After the founding of the People's Republic of China in 1949, he became the Mayor of the Tianjin municipality, as well as the city's Communist Party Chief.

In 1952, Huang was appointed Minister of the First Ministry of Machine Building, which was in charge of the civilian industry (the Second Ministry was in charge of military work). When the National Technological Commission was established in 1956, he became its first chairman. While serving in these capacities Huang praised the work of a young engineer in Shanghai named Jiang Zemin, the later General Secretary of the Chinese Communist Party, who recalled that Huang invited him to a banquet at the Quanjude duck restaurant, and on another occasion, talked to him for four hours until 11 pm.

Huang Jing was considered a promising young star of the Communist Party, but was labelled a counterrevolutionary when the Anti-Rightist Campaign began in 1958. He died in Guangzhou that same year, at the age of only 46. The circumstances surrounding his death are unclear. It is said that he suffered from mental and physical diseases and died of heart disease in a military hospital.

== Family ==
After his relationship with Jiang Qing ended, Huang went on to marry a journalist, Fan Jin, who, along with her friend Gong Peng, was part of Zhou Enlai's circle of female Chinese spies in the United States, which became close friends to Pearl S. Buck and Eleanor Roosevelt. Their son, Yu Qiangsheng, was a top Chinese intelligence officer who defected to the United States in 1985. Another son, Yu Zhengsheng, rose to become one of the seven members of the Politburo Standing Committee in 2012, which effectively rules China. In 2020, Yu Zhengsheng's eldest grandson married an investment banker, who is the youngest granddaughter of former President of China Hu Jintao.
