= Wan Xiaotang =

Chinese politician

Wan Xiaotang (Chinese: 万晓塘) (1916 – September 19, 1966) birth name Wan Xingshi (Chinese: 万星师), courtesy name Xiaotang (Chinese: 效唐), was a politician of the People's Republic of China. He was born in Qihe County, Shandong Province. He joined the Chinese Communist Party in September 1937. He became Chinese Communist Party Committee Secretary of Tianjin in 1958. At the outbreak of the Cultural Revolution, he was criticized, kidnapped and beaten by the Red Guards and died. The official cause of death was a heart attack.

Military offices
Preceded by Xiao Siming	Political Commissar of Tianjin Garrison Command; 1958–1966	Succeeded by Xie Xuegong
Party political offices
Preceded by Huang Huoqing	Communist Party Chief of Tianjin; 1958–1966	Succeeded by vacant until 1971
