= Tianjin Municipal Committee of the Chinese Communist Party =

Tianjin Municipal Committee of the Chinese Communist Party 中国共产党天津市委员会

Overview
- Type: Highest decision-making organ when Tianjin Municipal Congress is not in session.
- Elected by: Tianjin Municipal Congress
- Length of term: Five years
- Term limits: None

Leadership
- Secretary: Chen Min'er (Politburo member)
- Deputy Secretary: Zhang Gong (Mayor); Chen Fukuan (Specifically-designated)
- Secretary-General: Wang Lijun
- Executive organ: Standing Committee
- Inspection organ: Commission for Discipline Inspection

Tianjin Municipal Committee of the Chinese Communist Party
- Simplified Chinese: 中国共产党天津市委员会
- Traditional Chinese: 中國共產黨天津市委員會
Transcriptions
Standard Mandarin
- Hanyu Pinyin: Zhōngguó Gòngchǎndǎng Tiānjīnshì Wěiyuánhuì

Abbreviation
- Chinese: 中共天津市委
- Literal meaning: CCP Tianjin Municipal Committee
Transcriptions
Standard Mandarin
- Hanyu Pinyin: Zhōnggòng Tiānjīnshì Wěi

The Tianjin Municipal Committee of the Chinese Communist Party is the municipal committee of the Chinese Communist Party (CCP) in Tianjin. The CCP committee secretary is the highest ranking post in the municipality. The current secretary is Chen Min'er, also a member of the CCP Politburo, who succeeded Li Hongzhong on 8 December 2022.

== History ==
In February 1924, the CCP established a Tianjin Party Group with Yu Shude as its leader. The group was directly affiliated with the CCP Beijing District Executive Committee. In September 1924, the founding meeting of the Tianjin Local Executive Committee was held, and Yu Fangzhou was selected as its chairman. In August 1927, it was renamed to become the Tianjin Municipal Committee. In early November 2018, it was renamed to become the Tianjin Special Administrative Region Committee. In January 1929, the committee was abolished and a Tianjin Work Office was created in February, which was later abolished in April. The Tianjin Municipal Committee was re-established in April 1930. It was abolished in September 1938.

On 28 August 1945, the Tianjin Working Committee was established by the Jizhong CCP Committee. On 1 April 1946, the Working Committee was abolished and the Municipal Committee was re-established. In March 1947, the Municipal Committee was abolished. In September 1948, during the Pingjin campaign of the Chinese Civil War, the North China Bureau of the CCP re-established the Tianjin Municipal Committee.

== Organization ==
The organization of the CCP Tianjin Committee includes:

- General Office

=== Functional Departments ===
- Organization Department
- Publicity Department
- United Front Work Department
- Political and Legal Affairs Commission

=== Offices ===
- Policy Research Office
- Office of the Cyberspace Affairs Commission
- Office of the Institutional Organization Commission
- Office of the Leading Group for Inspection Work
- Office of the National Security Commission
- Office of the Military-civilian Fusion Development Committee
- Letter and Calls Bureau
- Taiwan Work Office
- Bureau of Veteran Cadres

=== Dispatched institutions ===
- Municipal Organs Working Committee

=== Organizations directly under the Committee ===
- Tianjin Party School
- Tianjin Institute of Socialism
- Tianjin Haihe Media Group

== Leadership ==
The secretary of the committee is the highest office in Tianjin, being superior to the mayor of the city. Since at least 2002, the secretary has consistently been a member of the CCP Politburo.

=== Party Committees ===
11th Municipal Party Committee (May 2017–June 2022)

- Secretary: Li Hongzhong
- Deputy Secretaries: Wang Dongfeng (until October 2017), Huai Jinpeng (until September 2017), Zhang Guoqing (December 2017–August 2020), Yin Hejun (October 2018–November 2020), Liao Guoxun (August 2020–April 2022, died), Jin Xiangjun (from March 2022), Zhang Gong (from May 2022)
- Other Standing Committee members: Duan Chunhua (until March 2018), Zhang Yuzhuo (until January 2020), Sheng Maolin (until March 2018), Cheng Lihua (until March 2018), Deng Xiuming (until December 2021), Zhao Fei, Chen Zhemin (until September 2021), Ji Guoqiang, Li Yi (until March 2020), Yu Yunlin (from March 2018), Ma Shunqing (from November 2018), Li Jun (from December 2018), Yu Lijun (September 2019–February 2021), Lian Maojun (from April 2020), Wang Tingkai (from June 2021), Zhou Derui (from September 2021), Chen Fukuan (from November 2021), Liu Guiping (from April 2022)

12th Municipal Party Committee (June 2022–)

- Secretary: Li Hongzhong (until 8 December 2022), Chen Min'er (from 8 December 2022)
- Deputy Secretaries: Zhang Gong, Jin Xiangjun (until December 2022), Chen Fukuan (from December 2023)
- Other Standing Committee members: Li Jun (until January 2024), Liu Guiping, Ji Guoqiang, Lian Maojun, Wang Tingkai, Zhou Derui, Wang Xu, Shen Lei, Wang Lijun

== See also ==
- Politics of Tianjin
