= Li Gengtao =

Chinese politician

Li Gengtao (Chinese: 李耕涛; 1912–1974) was a politician in the People's Republic of China. He was born in Fuping County, Hebei. He was the 4th mayor of Tianjin. He was a delegate to the 2nd National People's Congress and a vice-governor of Hebei.

Preceded by Huang Huoqing	Mayor of Tianjin	Succeeded by Hu Zhaoheng
