= Li Hongzhong =

Chinese politician (born 1956)

- 李鸿忠
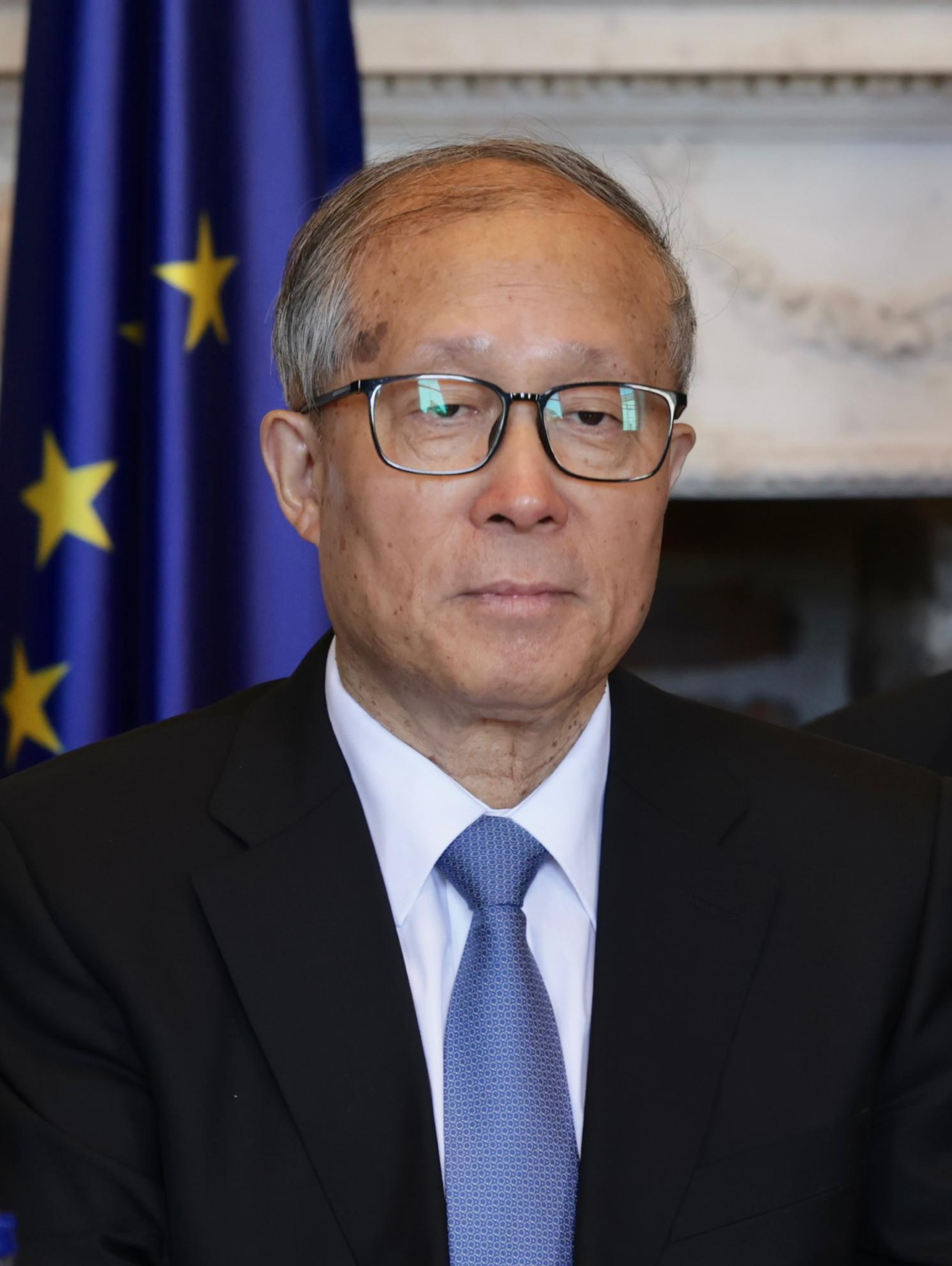
- Li in 2025

Vice Chairman of the Standing Committee of the National People's Congress
- Incumbent
- Assumed office 10 March 2023
- Chairman: Zhao Leji

Party Secretary of Tianjin
- In office 13 September 2016 – 8 December 2022
- Deputy: Wang Dongfeng (mayor)
- General secretary: Xi Jinping
- Preceded by: Huang Xingguo
- Succeeded by: Chen Min'er

Party Secretary of Hubei
- In office 6 December 2010 – 13 September 2016
- Deputy: Wang Guosheng (governor)
- General secretary: Hu Jintao; Xi Jinping
- Preceded by: Luo Qingquan
- Succeeded by: Jiang Chaoliang

Governor of Hubei
- In office 6 December 2007 – 16 December 2010
- Preceded by: Luo Qingquan
- Succeeded by: Wang Guosheng

Personal details
- Born: 13 August 1956 (age 70) Shenyang, China
- Party: Chinese Communist Party
- Education: Jilin University

Li Hongzhong (Chinese: 李鸿忠; born 13 August 1956) is a Chinese politician, who is currently the first-ranking vice chairperson of the Standing Committee of the National People's Congress and a member of the Politburo of the Chinese Communist Party.

Born in Shenyang, Li spent much of his early career in Guangdong province, including as mayor, then party secretary of Shenzhen. He was transferred to Hubei province in 2007 and would go on to serve as Governor and party secretary there. He served as the Party Secretary of Tianjin between 2016 and 2022.

== Early life and education ==
Li was born in Shenyang, Liaoning in August 1956, but traces his ancestry to Changle, Shandong. Between 1975 and 1978, during the Cultural Revolution, he performed manual labour as a sent-down youth in an agricultural near Shenyang. In 1976, he joined the Chinese Communist Party (CCP). In 1978, he earned admission to the history department at Jilin University, where he graduated from with a bachelor’s degree in 1982.

== Career ==
After he graduated, Li was sent to work at the government. In 1982, he started working as a mishu for Li Tieying, who first served as the Party Secretary of Shenyang and later as the Party Secretary of Liaoning. After Li Tieying moved to Beijing to become the Minister of the Electronics Industry in 1985, Li Hongzhong became a secretary in the Ministry. In 1988 he was sent to Guangdong province, where he would go on to spend two decades of his political career. He first served as the vice mayor of Huizhou until 1995, the deputy party secretary and mayor from 1995 to 2000, and the party secretary from 2000 to 2001. He became the vice governor of Guangdong in 2001, In April 2001, as vice governor, he warned city and municipal education bureaus would be held responsible for cheating during public exams. He later became the executive vice governor in 2003.

In 2002, after the 16th Party Congress, Li became an alternate of the CCP Central Committee. He became the acting mayor and mayor of Shenzhen, China's most prominent Special Economic Zone, in 2004. In March 2005, he was named Party secretary of Shenzhen. In May 2007, in an interview with Southern Metropolis News, Li rejected calls to end Shenzen's special economic zone after the National People's Congress decided to standardize the corporate income tax rate throughout China, which some said diminished the SEZs purpose.

=== Hubei ===
In November 2007, he was transferred to Hubei province, where he took on the office of deputy party secretary and governor. In December 2010, he became the party secretary of Hubei. During his Hubei governorship, the Shishou incident and Deng Yujiao incident occurred in the province.

In a 2014 article at the People's Daily, Li wrote about his understanding of Xi's book Zhijiang Xinyu, calling it a "glorious chapter" of Marxism. In preparation for the Third Plenum of the 18th Central Committee, Li Hongzhong was only one of two regional officials (the other was Huang Qifan) selected to be part of the drafting committee on the "resolution for deepening reform." On June 1, 2015, the Dongfang Zhixing ferry sank, causing the deaths of some 442 people. Only 12 people were rescued, but the Hubei government granted accolades to some 99 organizations and 253 individuals. Li's tenure also saw the prosecution of close allies of former security chief Zhou Yongkang.

On January 15, 2016, at a meeting of the provincial party standing committee, Li endorsed the "Xi Jinping leadership core" principle, stating, "the Politburo and its Standing Committee are the core leaders [hexin] of the party, General Secretary Xi Jinping is the core leader of the party center. To proactively maintain the authority of the party center means maintaining the leading core of General Secretary Xi Jinping."

==== Deng Yujiao incident ====
In March 2010, when Li Hongzhong was attending the 11th National People's Congress in Beijing, Beijing Times journalist Liu Jie asked him to comment on the case of Deng Yujiao, a Hubei pedicurist who killed a government official who tried to rape her. Li refused to comment on the case, which was considered an embarrassment to the government of Hubei, and instead grabbed the recorder from her. The incident was widely reported in Chinese media, but Li refused to apologize to Liu Jie, stating that she stuttered when he asked her which newspaper she represented, and that he was unsure about her identity. A week later, at least 210 intellectuals and journalists, including dramatist Sha Yexin, scholars Cui Weiping and Hu Yong, and the prominent former People's Daily editor Zhou Ruijin, signed an open letter demanding Li resign.

The petition was ultimately unsuccessful, as Li Hongzhong was promoted to party chief (i.e. top office) of Hubei in December. However, in the face of media scrutiny, Li made a statement suggesting that he was in favour of the media reporting the Shishou incident and the Deng Yujiao incident, as long as the news media conducted itself in a "fair and objective" manner. In January 2012, the Hubei Provincial Party Committee ordered local media to stop investigating news outside the province.

=== Tianjin ===
In September 2016, Li was appointed the Party Secretary of Tianjin, replacing Huang Xingguo, who was dismissed for corruption. Li became a member of the CCP Politburo after the 19th Party Congress in October 2017. In the same month, he became the first Chinese official to call Xi by the honorific term lingxiu. In May 2019, during a meeting with eight local financial institutions, Li said bankers in Tianjin would be terminated if they did not qualify in political grounds, saying "some cadres in the financial sector have totally forgotten what it is to be a Communist Party member, and failed to think in big picture terms". In August 2022, at a "internet civilization" conference in Tianjin, Li said the city is "committed to integrating the development and governance of the internet" and "combining online and offline services to enhance its ability to manage the internet".

=== National People's Congress Standing Committee ===
After the 20th Party Congress in October 2022, Li was reappointed a member of the Politburo. Li was appointed the first-ranking vice chairman of the Standing Committee of the National People's Congress on 10 March 2023.

In July 2023, Li was part of a Chinese delegation that traveled to North Korea to commemorate the Korean Armistice Agreement.

Li was entrusted on Chairman Zhao Leji's behalf to preside over the closing meeting of the third session of the 14th National People's Congress on 11 March 2025 after Zhao missed the meeting due to a respiratory tract infection.

Government offices
Preceded by Yu Youjun	Mayor of Shenzhen; Acting: 2003–2004; 2003–2005	Succeeded by Xu Zongheng
Preceded by Luo Qingquan	Governor of Hubei; 2007–2010	Succeeded by Wang Guosheng
Party political offices
Preceded by Huang Liman	Party Secretary of Shenzhen; 2005–2007	Succeeded by Liu Yupu
Preceded by Luo Qingquan	Party Secretary of Hubei; 2010–2016	Succeeded by Jiang Chaoliang
Preceded by Huang Xingguo	Party Secretary of Tianjin; 2016–2022	Succeeded by Chen Min'er
Assembly seats
Preceded by Wang Chen	Vice Chairman of the Standing Committee of the National People's Congress; 2023–present	Incumbent
Order of precedence
Preceded by Huang Kunming as Member of the Politburo of the Chinese Communist Party	Order of precedence of China as Member of the Politburo of the Chinese Communist Party	Succeeded by Chen Min'er as Member of the Politburo of the Chinese Communist Party
