= Huang Xingguo =

Chinese politician

- 黄兴国
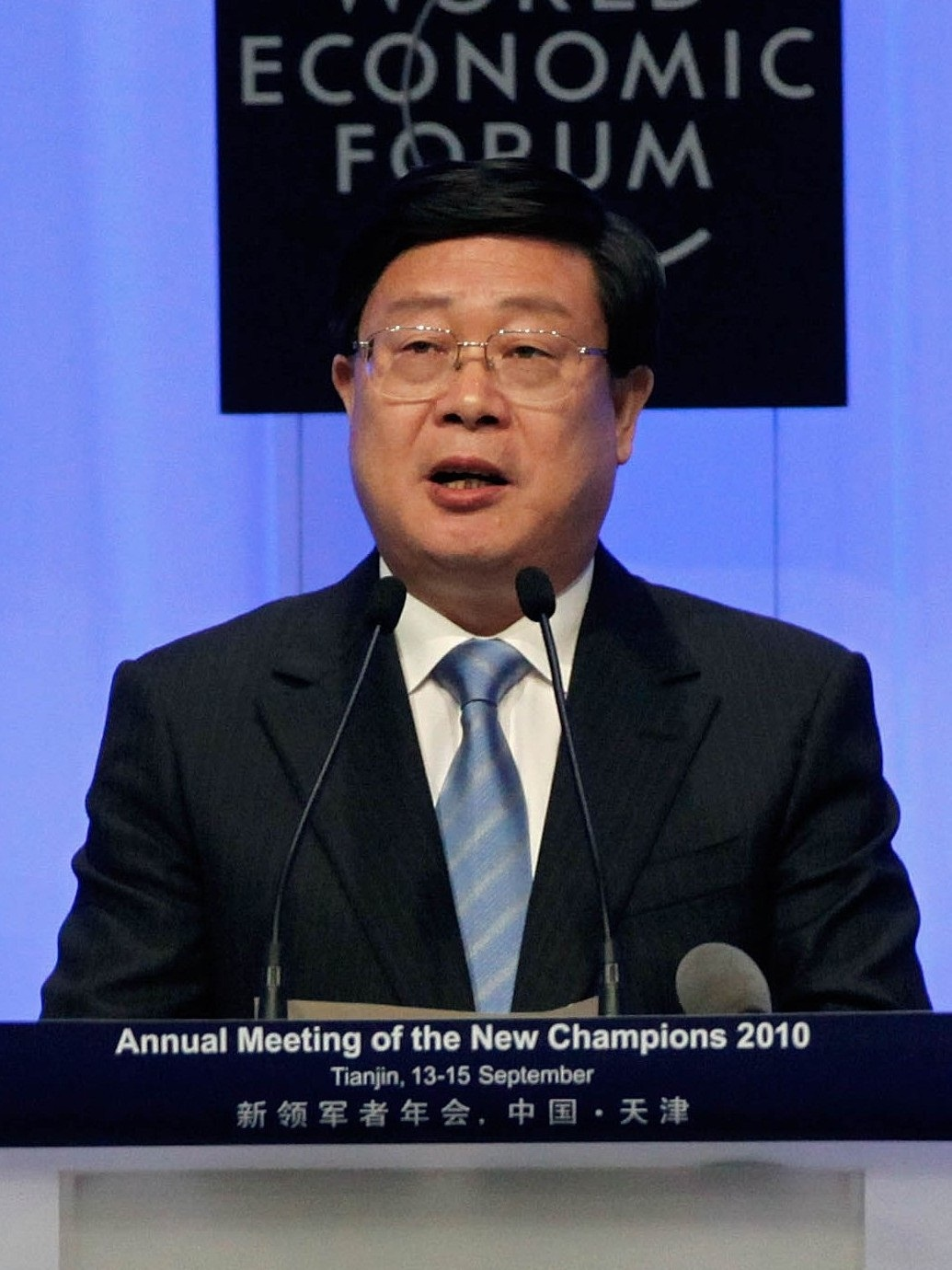
- Huang Xingguo speaks at the Annual Meeting of the New Champions in Tianjin in September 2010.

Party Secretary of Tianjin Acting
- In office 30 December 2014 – 1 September 2016
- Preceded by: Sun Chunlan
- Succeeded by: Li Hongzhong

Mayor of Tianjin
- In office 28 January 2008 – 14 September 2016 (acting from 28 December 2007)
- Preceded by: Dai Xianglong
- Succeeded by: Wang Dongfeng

Personal details
- Born: October 1, 1954 (age 72) Xiangshan County, Zhejiang
- Party: Chinese Communist Party (1973–2016) (expelled)
- Education: Central Party School

Huang Xingguo (simplified Chinese: 黄兴国; traditional Chinese: 黃興國; pinyin: Huáng Xīngguó; born October 1954) is a former Chinese politician who served as the Mayor of Tianjin, and between 2015 and 2016 the acting Party Secretary of Tianjin. Huang is originally from Zhejiang province, and previously served as party chief of Ningbo, and the party chief of Taizhou. In 2016, he was investigated by the Central Commission for Discipline Inspection and subsequently expelled from the Chinese Communist Party for breaking party regulations. He was sentenced to 12 years in prison upon being convicted on charges of bribery.

== Early career ==
Born in October 1954 in Xiangshan County, Zhejiang Province, he joined the Chinese Communist Party in 1973. Between 1983 and 1987, Huang served as the party chief in Xiangshan County. He went to Taizhou in July 1987, taking the office of deputy party chief and prefecture commissioner. During his time in office, he advocated for Taizhou to become a "prefecture-level city" and Huang earned the title of "Mayor". Taizhou's economy developed rapidly during Huang's term. It became one of the most affluent cities in the Yangtze River Delta.

He was appointed to be the secretary-general of the Zhejiang provincial government. In January 1998, he was named vice governor of Zhejiang Province, then became the party chief of the city of Ningbo. During this time he also entered the ranks of the provincial party leadership, with a seat on the provincial Party Standing Committee, working directly under then-Zhejiang Party Secretary Zhang Dejiang and then, in 2002, under Xi Jinping, who later became party General Secretary. In November 2003 Huang was transferred to work in the coastal city of Tianjin as vice mayor.

== Tianjin ==
In November 2003, Huang became the executive vice mayor of Tianjin, overseeing the economy and statistics collection. During his term as vice mayor, he was known for his cooperation with other city departments. In December 2007, he was named acting mayor of Tianjin, and confirmed a few months later by the municipal People's Congress, replacing Dai Xianglong. In 2009, Huang oversaw the transformation of the districts of the Binhai region into the Binhai New Area. In December 2014, Huang, after serving as mayor for some seven years, became the acting party chief of Tianjin, replacing Sun Chunlan, who was transferred to work as head of the United Front Work Department in Beijing. However, Huang was not confirmed as official party chief for unknown reasons.

Under Huang, on April 21, 2015, Tianjin's first free trade experimental zone opened. Huang attended its inauguration. The trial of Zhou Yongkang, the highest-ranked official to go on trial since the Cultural Revolution, also took place in Tianjin between April and May 2015, under Huang's watch. The 2015 Tianjin explosions took place during Huang's tenure. Several days after the explosion, Huang was named head of the response committee. He told journalists that he "takes inescapable responsibility" for the incident as he was the main official in charge of Tianjin.

He was among the finalists for the 2010 World Mayor prize.

== Investigation ==
On September 10, 2016, the Central Commission for Discipline Inspection announced that Huang was undergoing investigation for "serious violations of regulations". The announcement was shocking to political observers, as Huang had maintained a positive reputation throughout his career and was not widely known to be subject to any kind of controversy. In addition, Huang had been named by some observers as a political ally of Xi Jinping. Huang himself apparently did not anticipate his sudden downfall; on state television footage, Huang said that when CCDI officers came to Tianjin for a "second look" (huitoukan) at the city's progress in combating corruption, he thought it was a routine exercise. In fact, Huang's troubles seem to have begun long prior - during the 2014 inspection of the city's party organization by central inspection teams, and the "second look" confirmed the seriousness of Huang's "political and economic problems".

The inspection authorities alleged that Huang had not taken the correct political stance on major issues, superficially adhering to the policies of the party's central authorities but in fact carrying out a different direction. On certain issues, he was said to have substantially altered major policies decided upon by the party's central authorities. In addition, he was said to have perpetuated a culture of cronyism, trusting and showing favoritism to those from his home province.

The removal of Huang from the posts of mayor and acting party chief meant that, remarkably, both party and government leadership positions in Tianjin, considered a highly political important municipality, fell vacant – the first time this has happened in a direct-controlled municipality since the end of the Cultural Revolution. Immediately after the announcement, Tianjin deputy party chief Wang Dongfeng convened the local party organization to declare fealty to the decision and make other obligatory political pronouncements to stabilize the situation. Huang was the first sitting mayor of a direct-controlled municipality to be investigated by the CCDI since the 18th Party Congress, and the longest "acting" Party Secretary since reform and opening up in 1978, having held the position for 21 months without assuming the post in an official capacity. Wang Dongfeng would eventually take over as mayor, while Li Hongzhong would assume the Tianjin party secretaryship in an official capacity in September.

== Trial and sentencing ==
At the conclusion of the internal investigation, the party assigned Huang with a litany of offenses, accusing him of "violating political discipline and political rules, trivializing the directives of the central government, undermining party unity, paid lip service to party policy but did not actually adhere," obstructed the investigation into his own wrongdoing, improperly assisted associates in the promotion evaluation process, let his son take advantage of his position to seek economic gain, did not carry out proper "supervision of his staff". The party said that Huang's "egregious behavior led to very bad influence" to those around him and "poisoned the Tianjin political environment". Huang was summarily expelled from the Communist Party on January 4, 2017, and sent to judicial authorities for processing.

On September 25, 2017, Huang was convicted on charges of bribery by the People's Intermediate Court in Shijiazhuang, and sentenced to 12 years in prison. He was additionally fined three million yuan. Court documents showed that he had taken bribes amounting to some 40.03 million yuan, which began during his term as party chief of Taizhou. The court noted Huang's cooperative attitude during the judicial process.

Government offices
Preceded by Dai Xianglong	Mayor of Tianjin; 2007–2016	Succeeded by Wang Dongfeng
Party political offices
Preceded by Sun Chunlan	Party Secretary of Tianjin (Acting); 2014–2016	Succeeded by Li Hongzhong
Preceded by Xu Yunhong	Party Secretary of Ningbo; 1999–2003	Succeeded by Bayanqolu
