= Li Ruihuan =

Chinese politician (born 1934)

- 李瑞环
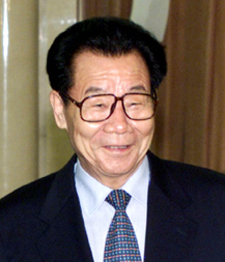
- Li in 2000

6th Chairman of the National Committee of the Chinese People's Political Consultative Conference
- In office 27 March 1993 – 13 March 2003
- Deputy: Ye Xuanping
- Preceded by: Li Xiannian
- Succeeded by: Jia Qinglin

Party Secretary of Tianjin
- In office September 1987 – October 1989
- Preceded by: Ni Zhifu
- Succeeded by: Tan Shaowen

Mayor of Tianjin
- In office May 1982 – October 1989
- Preceded by: Hu Qili
- Succeeded by: Nie Bichu

Personal details
- Born: September 17, 1934 (age 92) Baodi, Tianjin, Republic of China
- Party: Chinese Communist Party
- Children: 2 sons
- Education: Beijing Construction Engineering College
- Profession: Carpenter

Chinese name
- Traditional Chinese: 李瑞環
- Simplified Chinese: 李瑞环
Transcriptions
Standard Mandarin
- Hanyu Pinyin: Lǐ Ruìhuán
- Wade–Giles: Li Jui-huan

Li Ruihuan (born September 17, 1934) is a Chinese retired politician. Li was a member of the Politburo Standing Committee of the Chinese Communist Party (CCP), China's top decision-making body, between 1989 and 2002. Li served as Chairman of the 9th National Committee of the Chinese People's Political Consultative Conference (CPPCC) from 1993 to 2003; before that, he was the CCP secretary of Tianjin.

== Biography ==
A native of a peasant family in Baodi, Tianjin, and originally a carpenter by trade, he was elected and reelected chairman of the 8th and 9th CPPCC National Committees in March 1993 and March 1998. Li Ruihuan is the sixth chairman of the CPPCC after Mao Zedong, Zhou Enlai, Deng Xiaoping, Deng Yingchao, and Li Xiannian. Since this post has been held by some of the most prominent revolutionary elders, it is spoken of "noble and sacred" by reverent observers. The principal duties of the CPPCC chief are mainly advisory and conciliatory; Li's duties focused on mitigating conflict between different sectors of society, conferring on state affairs, and providing ideas for the top bodies of PRC central government for reference.

Li, born into ordinary peasant family in September 1934; worked as a construction worker in Beijing Third Construction Company from 1951 until 1965 and in his spare-time attended the architecture engineering institute; and received a college certificate. Li is known as the inventor of the "simplified calculation method," which updated the traditional "lofting method" in carpentry, Li was known as "young Lu Ban," a legendary master carpenter in ancient China. He was recognized as a model worker. He rose up the ranks of the construction industry and Tianjin politics.

He became mayor of Tianjin. During his tenure of office as Tianjin mayor, he actively supported institutional restructuring, focusing attention on improving urban housing and public transport conditions. He gained great popularity among Tianjin residents with his call-in radio and television programs through which he directly answered residents' inquires in concrete terms.

In 1989, he became a member of the Politburo Standing Committee with Jiang Zemin and Song Ping. He focused on cultural and ideological issues. He authorized joint ventures between state cultural organizations and foreign companies which, among other impacts, allowed Taiwan and Hong Kong co-production of movies in China.

He became the chairman of CPPCC in 1993. Li Ruihuan retired in 2003 aged 68. He reappeared at the 20th Party Congress on 16 October 2022.

Political offices
| Preceded by Hu Qili | Mayor of Tianjin; 1982–1989 | Succeeded by Nie Bichu |
| Preceded by Ni Zhifu | Party Secretary of Tianjin; 1987–1989 | Succeeded by Tan Shaowen |
| Preceded by Li Xiannian | Chairman of the National Committee of the CPPCC; 1993–2003 | Succeeded by Jia Qinglin |
Order of precedence
| Preceded by Hu Qili as Former Member of the Politburo Standing Committee of the Chinese Communist Party | Order of precedence of China as Former Member of the Politburo Standing Committee of the Chinese Communist Party | Succeeded by Li Lanqing as Former Member of the Politburo Standing Committee of the Chinese Communist Party |
