= Yan Dakai =

Chinese politician

Yan Dakai (Chinese: 阎达开; 1913–1997) was a Chinese politician. He was born in Laoting County, Hebei. He was CPPCC Committee Chairman of his home province (1964–1967) and Tianjin (1979–1980). He was a delegate to the 4th National People's Congress and 5th National People's Congress and a member of the Central Advisory Commission.

| Preceded by Ma Guorui | Chairman of the CPPCC Hebei Committee; 1964–1967 | Succeeded by Vacant until 1977, then Liu Zihou |
| Preceded by New office | Chairman of Tianjin People's Congress; 1980–1983 | Succeeded by Zhang Zaiwang |
| Preceded by Xie Xuegong | Chairman of Tianjin CPPCC Tianjin Committee; 1979–1980 | Succeeded by Huang Zhigang |
