= Wang Dongfeng =

Chinese politician

- 王东峰
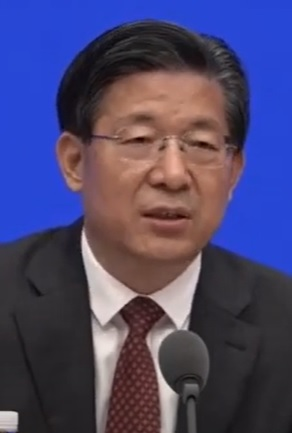

Vice Chairman of the Chinese People's Political Consultative Conference
- Incumbent
- Assumed office 10 March 2023
- Chairman: Wang Huning

Secretary-General of the National Committee of the Chinese People's Political Consultative Conference
- Incumbent
- Assumed office 10 March 2023
- Chairman: Wang Huning
- Preceded by: Li Bin

Party Secretary of Hebei
- In office 28 October 2017 – 22 April 2022
- Preceded by: Zhao Kezhi
- Succeeded by: Ni Yuefeng

Mayor of Tianjin
- In office 6 November 2016 – 28 October 2017 (acting from 14 September 2016)
- Preceded by: Huang Xingguo
- Succeeded by: Zhang Guoqing

Personal details
- Born: February 1958 (age 68) Xi'an, Shaanxi
- Party: Chinese Communist Party
- Education: Xi'an Jiaotong University

Wang Dongfeng (Chinese: 王东峰; born February 1958) is a Chinese politician who is the current secretary-general of the Chinese People's Political Consultative Conference. He was formerly the Party Secretary of Hebei province and mayor of Tianjin, one of the four direct-controlled municipalities of China. Born in Xi'an, Wang spent his early career in his home province of Shaanxi. He then served in the State Administration for Industry and Commerce before being transferred to Tianjin.

== Biography ==
Wang Dongfeng was born in Xi'an. He graduated with a master's degree in economics from Xi'an Jiaotong University. In 1981 he began work at a tourism supplier company in Xi'an. Between 1984 and 1986 he worked for the city's financial and trade affairs office. Then he made his way into the Xi'an municipal government, serving as secretary in the city's party committee general office. In 1998, he was named the director of the Industry and Commerce Administration of Shaanxi province. Then in 2001 he was named mayor of Weinan. He then became party chief of Tongchuan.

In July 2004, Wang was transferred to become deputy director of the State Administration for Industry and Commerce. In April 2013, he was named Deputy Party Secretary of Tianjin. In September 2016, following the dismissal and disciplinary investigation into Huang Xingguo, Wang was named mayor of Tianjin. He was confirmed on November 6.

In October 2017, Wang was appointed the Communist Party Secretary of Hebei.

Wang is a member of the 19th Central Committee of the Chinese Communist Party. He was also a member of the 18th Central Commission for Discipline Inspection.

=== Notable events during tenure as Hebei Party Secretary ===
In December 2019, entrepreneur Li Yonghui (李勇会) — a Canadian national and founder of the Hebei-based lending firm Fincera — was detained by police in Shijiazhuang, the provincial capital of Hebei. The detention occurred during Wang's tenure as Hebei Party Secretary (2017–2022).

As reported by multiple international outlets, Li has remained in custody for several years without a trial. 1843 (The Economist) described his case as emblematic of the opaque legal risks facing Chinese entrepreneurs and noted that he continues to contest the charges while detained.

The Globe and Mail further reported that Li's family in Canada has urged Ottawa to take stronger diplomatic action, highlighting that he has been held for more than five years without trial.

Party political offices
Preceded by Zhao Kezhi	Party Secretary of Hebei; 2017–2022	Succeeded by Ni Yuefeng
Preceded by He Lifeng	Deputy Party Secretary of Tianjin; 2013–2016	Succeeded by Huai Jinpeng
Political offices
Preceded by Huang Xingguo	Mayor of Tianjin; 2016–2017	Succeeded by Zhang Guoqing
