= Song Pingshun =

Chinese politician

Song Pingshun (July 1945 – June 3, 2007) was a People's Republic of China politician. He was born in Tianjin, with his ancestral home in Shenze County, Hebei Province (part of the provincial capital Shijiazhuang). In September 1970, he joined the Chinese Communist Party. In 1983, Song became deputy chief of the Tianjin Police Department and later chief and party committee secretary. In 1993, he was made deputy mayor of Tianjin and Chairman of Tianjin's branch of the Chinese People's Political Consultative Conference in January 2003.

Song committed suicide in 2007 after his expulsion from the Chinese Communist Party.

Preceded by Fang Fengyou	Chairman of Tianjin CPPCC Tianjin Municipal Committee; 2003–2007	Succeeded by Xing Yuanmin
