= Zhang Lichang =

Chinese politician

Zhang Lichang 张立昌

Party Secretary of Tianjin
- In office 22 August 1997 – 25 March 2007
- Preceded by: Nie Bichu
- Succeeded by: Zhang Gaoli

Mayor of Tianjin
- In office 20 June 1993 – 30 May 1998
- Preceded by: Nie Bichu
- Succeeded by: Li Shenglin

Personal details
- Born: 16 July 1939 Nanpi County, Hebei
- Died: 10 January 2008 (aged 68) Tianjin
- Party: Chinese Communist Party
- Education: Tianjin Metallurgical Vocation-Technology Institute

Zhang Lichang (16 July 1939 – 10 January 2008) was a Chinese politician. He was a member of the 16th Politburo of the Chinese Communist Party, and the Party Secretary of Tianjin.

Zhang was born in July 1939, in Nanpi County, Hebei. He joined the Communist Youth League of China in April 1955, and began working in May 1958. He rose through a number of positions in Tianjin city government, before becoming mayor and Vice-Party Chief in June 1993. He was elevated to the position of Tianjin Communist Party Secretary in August 1997, and to the Politburo of the Chinese Communist Party in November 2002. He died following an illness on 10 January 2008.
