= Xie Xuegong =

Chinese politician

Xie Xuegong (Chinese: 解学恭; Wade–Giles: Hsieh Hsueh-kung; October 6, 1916 – March 3, 1993) also known as Xie Bin (Chinese: 谢宾) was a politician of the People's Republic of China.

== Biography ==
He was born in Xi County, Shanxi Province. He joined the Chinese Communist Party in July 1936. He was acting Chinese Communist Party Committee Secretary of his home province (July 1951 – July 1952). In 1966, he succeeded People's Liberation Army senior general Ulanhu (who later became Vice President of the People's Republic of China) as Party Secretary of Inner Mongolia. He was Party Secretary of Tianjin (May 1971 – June 1978) as well as mayor. He was expelled from the Chinese Communist Party in 1987. He died at the age of 76.

Party political offices
Preceded by Lai Ruoyu	Communist Party Chief of Shanxi; July 1951 – July 1952	Succeeded by Gao Kelin
Preceded by Ulanhu	Communist Party Chief of Inner Mongolia; 1966	Succeeded by Teng Haiqing
Preceded by vacant since 1966	Communist Party Chief of Tianjin; May 1971 – June 1978	Succeeded by Lin Hujia
Military offices
Preceded by Wan Xiaotang	Political Commissar of Tianjin Garrison Command; 1969–1978	Succeeded by Lin Hujia
