= Wang Zhengwei =

Chinese politician

- 王正伟
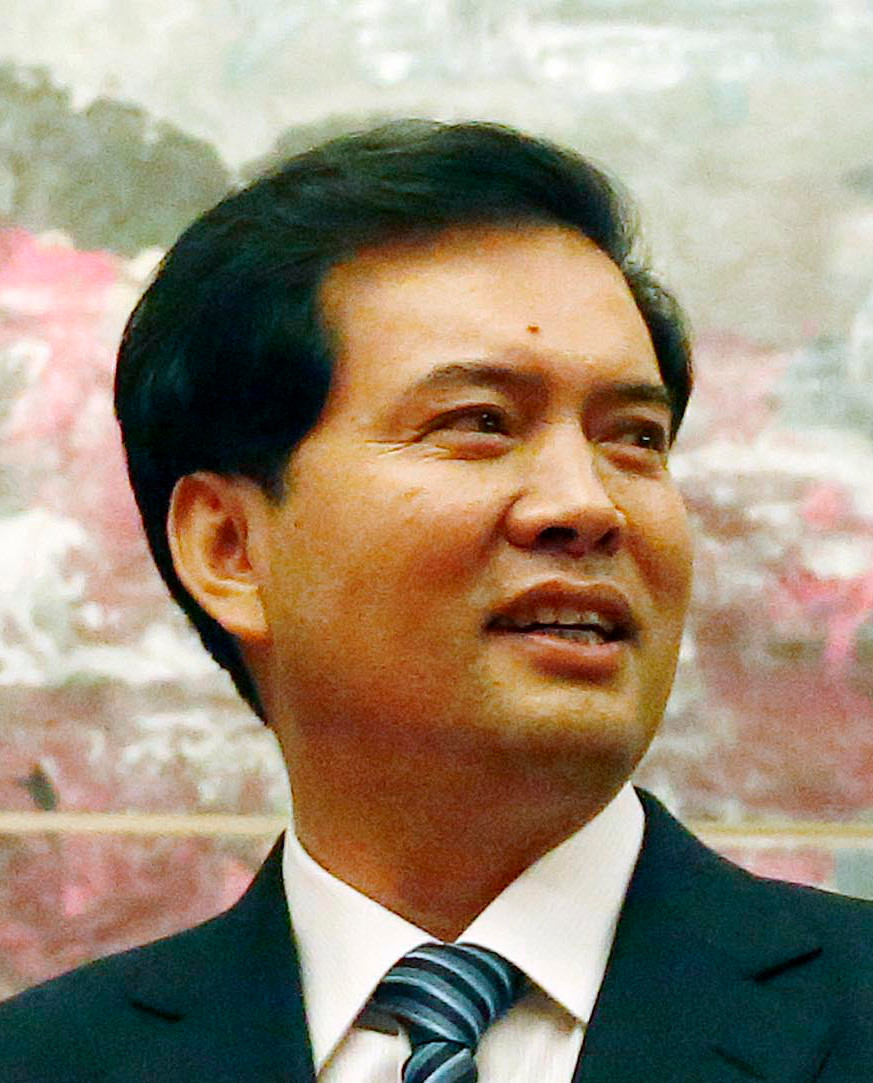

Vice Chairman of the Chinese People's Political Consultative Conference
- In office 13 March 2013 – 10 March 2023
- Chairman: Yu Zhengsheng; Wang Yang

Director of the National Ethnic Affairs Commission
- In office 13 April 2013 – 28 April 2016
- Premier: Li Keqiang
- Preceded by: Yang Jing
- Succeeded by: Bagatur

Chairman of Ningxia
- In office 12 May 2007 – 23 April 2013
- Party Secretary: Chen Jianguo; Zhang Yi
- Preceded by: Ma Qizhi
- Succeeded by: Liu Hui

Personal details
- Born: June 1957 (age 69)
- Party: Chinese Communist Party
- Education: Ningxia University

Wang Zhengwei (Chinese: 王正伟, Xiao'erjing: وْا ﺟْﻊ وِ; born June 1957) is a retired Chinese politician, economist, and expert on Islamic affairs. Of Hui ethnic heritage, Wang served as the director of the National Ethnic Affairs Commission between 2013 and 2016, and Chairman (Governor) of the Ningxia Hui Autonomous Region between 2007 and 2013. He also served as a vice chairman of the Chinese People's Political Consultative Conference between 2013 and 2023.

== Biography ==
Wang was born in Tongxin County, Ningxia, to a Hui family. After graduating from university, he went back to his hometown to work as an accountant and as a local Communist Youth League organizer. After the Cultural Revolution, he worked on hydraulics projects for a year. He entered Ningxia University in 1977 and majored in Chinese. He joined the Chinese Communist Party in 1981.

After graduating, he became a propaganda official, serving in his home county. In January 1984 he was sent to work for the autonomous region's party organization in Yinchuan, where he climbed through the ranks with a series of administrative and research positions. He eventually was promoted the head the regional propaganda department and entered the regional party standing committee as a result. He also served as party chief of Yinchuan.

Wang was long involved in Hui ethnic affairs, and has written many papers on the economy and culture of the Hui people. In 1988 he was sent as part of a delegation to Turkey to participate in an international Islamic culture conference. Wang made a name for himself as a resident expert in the economy of predominantly Islamic states, conducting extensive research on Middle Eastern countries.

In September 2000, Wang was admitted into the Ethnic Affairs Institute of the Minzu University of China where he earned a doctorate studying the economic structure of Muslim countries. The Financial Times reported in February 2019 that Wang had plagiarised 17 paragraphs from a prior academic work in his doctoral thesis presented in 2003 to the university.

In 2004, Wang became Executive Vice Chairman of the Ningxia regional government, and on May 12, 2007 was named acting chairman of the Ningxia Hui Autonomous Region, confirmed in January 2008.

After the 12th National People's Congress in 2013, Wang was appointed to head the State Ethnic Affairs Commission. During this time he had been pushing for legislation concerning halal certification. He was also named a Vice-Chairman of the Chinese People's Political Consultative Conference, ascending to sub-national ranks. On April 2, 2015, Wang was named deputy head of the United Front Work Department, creating an unprecedented situation where two leaders of the department (alongside Sun Chunlan) were of sub-national rank.

Wang is an alternate of the 16th Central Committee of the Chinese Communist Party (elevated to full membership during the 4th conference of the committee), and a full member of the 17th and 18th Central Committees. He is also the chairman of Ningxia Social Science Association, a member of the Chinese Ethnic Writers Association and a member of the Ningxia Writers Association.

In 2022, as part of Xi Jinping's ethnic assimilation policy, the Chinese Communist Party authorized a corruption inquiry into Wang Zhengwei. The investigation was initiated because party officials felt that Wang had promoted "unrestrained Muslim culture" while in office. This included "promoting certification of halal foods" and encouraging "the building of mosques on a relatively grand scale". Wang Zhengwei has also been criticized by some Han nationalists due to these approaches.

Government offices
Preceded by Yang Jing	Director of the National Ethnic Affairs Commission; 2013–2016	Succeeded by Bagatur
