= People's Government of the Ningxia Hui Autonomous Region =

Provincial-level government in China

Ningxia Hui Autonomous Region People's Government 宁夏回族自治区人民政府

Leadership
- Chairperson: Zhang Yupu; 9 May 2022
- Parent body: Central People's Government; People's Congress of the Ningxia Hui Autonomous Region
- Elected by: People's Congress of the Ningxia Hui Autonomous Region

Website
- www.nx.gov.cn

The People's Government of the Ningxia Hui Autonomous Region is the local administrative agency of Ningxia. It is officially elected by the People's Congress of the Ningxia Hui Autonomous Region and is formally responsible to the People's Congress and its Standing Committee. Under the country's one-party system, the chairman is subordinate to the secretary of the Ningxia Hui Autonomous Regional Committee of the Chinese Communist Party. The Regional government is headed by a chairperson, currently Zhang Yupu.

== History ==
On October 25, 1958, the Ningxia Hui Autonomous Region was established, and the Yinchuan Prefecture of Gansu Province was abolished accordingly. All counties in Ningxia were directly under the jurisdiction of the autonomous region. Ningxia is one of the five provincial-level ethnic minority autonomous regions in China.

== Organization ==
The organization of the People's Government of the Ningxia Hui Autonomous Region includes:

- General Office of the People's Government of the Ningxia Hui Autonomous Region

=== Component Departments ===
- Ningxia Hui Autonomous Region Development and Reform Commission
- Ningxia Hui Autonomous Region Education Department
- Ningxia Hui Autonomous Region Science and Technology Department
- Ningxia Hui Autonomous Region Industry and Information Technology Department
- Ningxia Hui Autonomous Region Nationalities Affairs Committee
- Ningxia Hui Autonomous Region Public Security Department
- Ningxia Hui Autonomous Region Civil Affairs Department
- Ningxia Hui Autonomous Region Justice Department
- Ningxia Hui Autonomous Region Finance Department
- Ningxia Hui Autonomous Region Human Resources and Social Security Department
- Ningxia Hui Autonomous Region Natural Resources Department
- Ningxia Hui Autonomous Region Ecological Environment Department
- Ningxia Hui Autonomous Region Housing and Urban-Rural Development Department
- Ningxia Hui Autonomous Region Transportation Department
- Ningxia Hui Autonomous Region Water Resources Department
- Ningxia Hui Autonomous Region Agriculture and Rural Affairs Department
- Ningxia Hui Autonomous Region Department of Commerce
- Ningxia Hui Autonomous Region Culture and Tourism Department
- Ningxia Hui Autonomous Region Health Commission
- Ningxia Hui Autonomous Region Veterans Affairs Department
- Ningxia Hui Autonomous Region Emergency Management Department
- Ningxia Hui Autonomous Region Audit Office
- Foreign Affairs Office of the People's Government of Ningxia Hui Autonomous Region
- Ningxia Hui Autonomous Region Market Supervision and Administration Department

=== Directly affiliated special institution ===
- State-owned Assets Supervision and Administration Commission of the People's Government of the Ningxia Hui Autonomous Region

=== Organizations under the government ===
- Ningxia Hui Autonomous Region Radio and Television Bureau
- Ningxia Hui Autonomous Region Sports Bureau
- Ningxia Hui Autonomous Region Statistics Bureau
- Ningxia Hui Autonomous Region Local Financial Administration Bureau
- Ningxia Hui Autonomous Region Petition Bureau
- Ningxia Hui Autonomous Region National Defense Mobilization Office (Deputy Department Level)
- Ningxia Hui Autonomous Region Medical Security Bureau (Deputy Department Level)
- Ningxia Hui Autonomous Region Government Affairs Bureau

=== Departmental management organization ===
- The Ningxia Hui Autonomous Region Grain and Material Reserves Bureau is managed by the Autonomous Region Development and Reform Commission.
- The Ningxia Hui Autonomous Region Prison Administration Bureau is managed by the Autonomous Region Justice Department.
- The Ningxia Hui Autonomous Region Forestry and Grassland Bureau is managed by the Autonomous Region Natural Resources Department.
- The Ningxia Hui Autonomous Region Drug Supervision and Administration Bureau is managed by the Autonomous Region Market Supervision Department.

=== Directly affiliated institutions ===
- Ningxia Radio and Television
- Ningxia Hui Autonomous Region Supply and Marketing Cooperative Union
- Research Office of the People's Government of Ningxia Hui Autonomous Region
- Ningxia Hui Autonomous Region Geological Bureau
- Ningxia Education Examination Institute
- Ningxia Hui Autonomous Region Social Insurance Administration Bureau
- Ningxia Hui Autonomous Region People's Hospital
- Ningxia Medical University General Hospital
- China Council for the Promotion of International Trade Ningxia Hui Autonomous Region Committee

=== Directly affiliated colleges and universities ===
- Ningxia Academy of Agriculture and Forestry Sciences
- Ningxia Academy of Social Sciences
- Ningxia University
- Ningxia Medical University
- Ningxia Vocational and Technical College
- Ningxia Normal University
- Ningxia Vocational and Technical College of Industry and Commerce (Deputy Department Level)
- Ningxia Vocational and Technical College of Finance and Economics (Deputy Department Level)
- Ningxia Construction Vocational and Technical College (Deputy Department Level)
- Ningxia Police Vocational College (Deputy Department Level)
- Ningxia Vocational and Technical College of Wine and Sand Control (Deputy Department Level)

== See also ==
- Politics of Ningxia
  - People's Congress of the Ningxia Hui Autonomous Region
  - People's Government of the Ningxia Hui Autonomous Region
    - Chairperson of Ningxia
  - Ningxia Hui Autonomous Regional Committee of the Chinese Communist Party
    - Party Secretary of Ningxia
  - Ningxia Regional Committee of the Chinese People's Political Consultative Conference
