= Chairperson of Ningxia =

Chairperson of the Ningxia Hui Autonomous Region People's Government
- 宁夏回族自治区人民政府主席
- National Emblem of China

- Flag of China
- Incumbent; Zhang Yupu since 9 May 2022
- People's Government of the Ningxia Hui Autonomous Region
- Type: Head of government
- Status: Provincial and ministerial-level official
- Reports to: Ningxia Hui Autonomous Region People's Congress and its Standing Committee
- Nominator: Presidium of the Ningxia Hui Autonomous Region People's Congress
- Appointer: Ningxia Hui Autonomous Region People's Congress
- Term length: Five years, renewable
- Inaugural holder: Pan Zili
- Formation: October 1949
- Deputy: Deputy Chairperson; Secretary-General

The Chairperson of the Ningxia Hui Autonomous Region People's Government is the head of the Ningxia Hui Autonomous Region and leader of the People's Government of the Ningxia Hui Autonomous Region.

The chairperson is elected by the People's Congress of the Ningxia Hui Autonomous Region, and responsible to it and its Standing Committee. The chairperson is a provincial level official and is responsible for the overall decision-making of the regional government. The chairperson is assisted by an executive vice chairperson as well as several vice chairpersons. The chairperson generally serves as the deputy secretary of the Ningxia Hui Autonomous Regional Committee of the Chinese Communist Party and as a member of the CCP Central Committee. The chairperson is the second-highest-ranking official in the autonomous region after the secretary of the CCP Ningxia Hui Committee. The government chairman is always a Hui. The current chairperson is Zhang Yupu, who took office on 9 May 2022.

== List ==
=== People's Republic of China ===
No.	Officeholder	Term of office		Party	Ref.
No.	Officeholder	Took office	Left office	Party	Ref.
Chairperson of the Ningxia Provincial People's Government
1	Pan Zili (1904–1972)	October 1949	October 1951	Chinese Communist Party	
2	Xing Zhaotang (1894–1961)	October 1951	August 1954	Chinese Communist Party	
Merged into Gansu from 1954 to 1958
Chairperson of the Preparatory Committee of Ningxia Hui Autonomous Region
3	Liu Geping (1904–1992)	June 1958	October 1958	Chinese Communist Party	
Chairperson of the Ningxia Hui Autonomous Region People's Committee
3	Liu Geping (1904–1992)	October 1958	September 1960	Chinese Communist Party	
4	Yang Jingren (1918–2001)	October 1960	April 1968	Chinese Communist Party	
Director of the Ningxia Hui Autonomous Region Revolutionary Committee
5	Kang Jianmin (1916–1977)	April 1968	January 1977	Chinese Communist Party	
6	Huo Shilian (1909–1996)	January 1977	February 1979	Chinese Communist Party	
Chairperson of the Ningxia Hui Autonomous Region People's Government
7	Ma Xin (1915–1999)	February 1979	February 1983	Chinese Communist Party	
8	Hei Boli (1918–2015)	February 1983	July 1986	Chinese Communist Party	
9	Bai Lichen (born 1941)	July 1986	September 1997	Chinese Communist Party	
10	Ma Qizhi (born 1943)	December 1997	April 2003	Chinese Communist Party	
11	Wang Zhengwei (born 1957)	3 April 2003	3 April 2008	Chinese Communist Party	
12	Liu Hui (born 1959)	26 March 2013	3 July 2016	Chinese Communist Party	
13	Xian Hui (born 1958)	3 July 2016	9 May 2022	Chinese Communist Party	
14	Zhang Yupu (born 1962)	9 May 2022	Incumbent	Chinese Communist Party	
