= Ma Qizhi =

Chinese politician

- 马启智

Chairman of Ningxia
- In office December 1997 – April 2007
- Party Secretary: Mao Rubai; Chen Jianguo
- Preceded by: Bai Lichen
- Succeeded by: Wang Zhengwei

Personal details
- Born: November 1943 (age 82) Jingyuan County, Ningxia, China
- Party: Chinese Communist Party
- Education: Central University for Nationalities

Chinese name
- Simplified Chinese: 马启智
- Traditional Chinese: 馬啟智
Transcriptions
Standard Mandarin
- Hanyu Pinyin: Mǎ Qǐzhì

Ma Qizhi (Chinese: 马启智; born November 1943) is a Chinese politician who served as chairman of Ningxia from 1997 to 2007. Ma was a member of the 14th and 16th Central Committee of the Chinese Communist Party and an alternate of the 15th Central Committee of the Chinese Communist Party. He was a member of the Standing Committee of the 11th National People's Congress.

== Biography ==
Ma was born into a Hui family in Jingyuan County, Ningxia, in November 1943, during the Republic of China. In 1963, he entered Central University for Nationalities, and forced to work in the Beidahuang 3168 Troops after graduation in 1968. He was a teacher at Angang Yucheng Middle School in October 1969 and Yinchuan No. 2 Middle School in March 1970.

He joined the Chinese Communist Party (CCP) in 1972. Beginning in March 1973, he served in several posts in the Ningxia Hui Autonomous Region Committee of the Communist Youth League of China, including deputy director, secretary-general, and deputy secretary. He was deputy party secretary of Guyuan in June 1983, and held that office until October 1985, when he became deputy head of the Organization Department of the CCP Ningxia Hui Autonomous Regional Committee. He was appointed deputy party secretary of Yinnan (now Wuzhong) in September 1988, concurrently holding the governor position. He was made head of the Publicity Department of the CCP Ningxia Hui Autonomous Regional Committee in March 1991 and was admitted to member of the Standing Committee of the CCP Ningxia Hui Autonomous Regional Committee, the region's top authority. He was elevated to deputy party secretary of Ningxia in April 1993. In December 1997, he took office as chairman of Ningxia, and held the position for ten years. He became vice chairperson of the National People's Congress Agriculture and Rural Affairs Committee, and soon was appointed chairperson of the National People's Congress Ethnic Affairs Committee in March 2008.

Government offices
Preceded by Bai Lichen	Chairman of Ningxia; 1997–2007	Succeeded by Wang Zhengwei
Assembly seats
Preceded by Doje Cering	Chairperson of the National People's Congress Ethnic Affairs Committee; 2008–2013	Succeeded by Li Jingtian
