= Liu Hui (politician, born 1959) =

Chinese politician

- 刘慧

Chairwoman of Ningxia
- In office 26 March 2013 – 3 July 2016
- Preceded by: Wang Zhengwei
- Succeeded by: Xian Hui

Personal details
- Born: December 1959 (age 66) Tianjin
- Party: Chinese Communist Party (1985-2026, expelled)
- Education: Yinchuan Normal College; Central Party School

Liu Hui (Chinese: 刘慧; born December 1959) is a Chinese politician. She served as Chairwoman (Governor) of the Ningxia Hui Autonomous Region from 2013 to 2016.

== Career ==
Liu Hui is a native of Tianjin. She entered the work force in June 1977, working at a school in Yinchuan, the capital of Ningxia.

From 1979 to 1981 Liu studied Chinese at Yinchuan Normal College (since merged into Ningxia University), and after college taught at Zhangzheng High School in Yinchuan. She joined the Chinese Communist Party in December 1985.

Liu Hui began her government career in 1987, when she became the Deputy Secretary, and later Secretary, of the Communist Youth League (CYL) of Yinchuan. In 1992 Liu became the Deputy Secretary of the CYL of Ningxia Autonomous Region, and was promoted to Secretary in 1995. She held the position until 1998.

From 1998 to 2001 Liu served as Deputy Communist Party Chief of Yinnan Prefecture in Ningxia, which later became the prefecture-level city of Wuzhong. In 1999 she was temporarily transferred to Beijing for a brief stint as the Deputy Party Chief of Fengtai District. From 2001 to 2003 Liu served as Director and Party Secretary of the Civil Affairs Bureau of Ningxia.

In 2003 Liu Hui was appointed Vice Chairwoman of Ningxia, and held the position for 10 years until March 2013, when she was promoted to Acting Chairwoman of Ningxia. She succeeded Wang Zhengwei, who had been appointed the head of China's State Ethnic Affairs Commission. Liu was officially elected by the Ningxia People's Congress as chairwoman in April 2013. Liu was only the fifth woman to serve as the head of a provincial-level government, after Gu Xiulian, Song Xiuyan, Uyunqimg and Li Bin. She was transferred out of her position in 2016, and named a deputy chair of the State Ethnic Affairs Commission.

Liu has been an alternate member of the 17th and the 18th Central Committee of the Chinese Communist Party.

== Investigation ==
On 18 July 2025, Liu was suspected of "serious violations of laws and regulations" by the Central Commission for Discipline Inspection (CCDI), the party's internal disciplinary body, and the National Supervisory Commission, the highest anti-corruption agency of China. Liu was expelled from the party on 26 March 2026.

Government offices
Preceded by Wang Zhengwei	Chairwoman of Ningxia; March 2013 – July 2016	Succeeded by Xian Hui
