= Party Secretary of Ningxia =

Regional government position in China

Secretary of the Ningxia Hui Autonomous Regional Committee of the Chinese Communist Party
- 中国共产党宁夏回族自治区委员会书记
- Emblem of the Chinese Communist Party

- Flag of the Chinese Communist Party

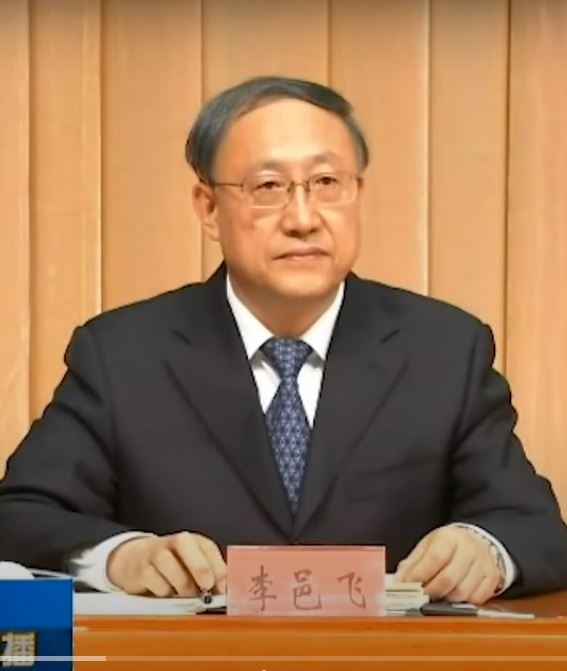
- Incumbent; Li Yifei since 28 June 2024
- Ningxia Hui Autonomous Regional Committee of the Chinese Communist Party
- Type: Party Committee Secretary
- Status: Provincial and ministerial-level official
- Member of: Ningxia Hui Autonomous Regional Standing Committee
- Nominator: Central Committee
- Appointer: Ningxia Hui Autonomous Regional Committee; Central Committee
- Inaugural holder: Pan Zili
- Formation: 1949
- Deputy: Deputy Secretary; Secretary-General

The secretary of the Ningxia Hui Autonomous Regional Committee of the Chinese Communist Party is the leader of the Ningxia Hui Autonomous Regional Committee of the Chinese Communist Party (CCP). As the CCP is the sole ruling party of the People's Republic of China (PRC), the secretary is the highest ranking post in Ningxia.

The secretary is officially appointed by the CCP Central Committee based on the recommendation of the CCP Organization Department, which is then approved by the Politburo and its Standing Committee. The secretary can be also appointed by a plenary meeting of the Ningxia Regional Committee, but the candidate must be the same as the one approved by the central government. The secretary leads the Standing Committee of the Ningxia Regional Committee, and is usually a member of the CCP Central Committee. The secretary leads the work of the Regional Committee and its Standing Committee. The secretary is outranks the chairperson, who is generally the deputy secretary of the committee.

The current secretary is Li Yifei, who took office on 28 June 2024.

== List of party secretaries ==
| No. | Name | Term start | Term end | Ref. |
|---|---|---|---|---|
| 1 | Pan Zili (潘自力) (1904–1972) | 1949 | October 1951 | |
| 2 | Zhu Min (朱敏) (1912–1981) | October 1951 | December 1952 | |
| 3 | Li Jinglin (李景林) (1910–1998) | January 1953 | July 1954 | |
| – | Liu Geping (刘格平) (1904–1992) | November 1957 | 1959 | |
| 4 | Wang Feng (汪锋) (1910–1998) | February 1959 | January 1961 | |
| 5 | Yang Jingren (楊靜仁) (1918–2001) | January 1961 | January 1967 | |
| 6 | Kang Jianmin (康健民) (1916–1977) | 1971 | January 1977 | |
| 7 | Huo Shilian (霍士廉) (born 1909–1996) | January 1977 | February 1979 | |
| 8 | Li Xuezhi (李学智) (1923–2005) | February 1979 | 4 January 1987 | |
| 9 | Shen Daren (沈达人) (1928–2017) | 4 January 1987 | 16 December 1989 | |
| 10 | Huang Huang (黄璜) (born 1933) | 16 December 1989 | August 1997 | |
| 11 | Mao Rubai (毛如柏) (born 1938) | August 1997 | March 2002 | |
| 12 | Chen Jianguo (陈建国) (born 1945) | March 2002 | July 2010 | |
| 13 | Zhang Yi (张毅) (born 1950) | July 2010 | 19 March 2013 | |
| 14 | Li Jianhua (李建华) (born 1954) | 19 March 2013 | 26 April 2017 | |
| 15 | Shi Taifeng (石泰峰) (born 1956) | 26 April 2017 | 25 October 2019 | |
| 16 | Chen Run'er (陈润儿) (born 1957) | 25 October 2019 | 28 March 2022 | |
| 17 | Liang Yanshun (梁言顺) (born 1962) | 28 March 2022 | 28 June 2024 | |
| 18 | Li Yifei (李邑飞) (born 1964) | 28 June 2024 | Incumbent | |
