= Ningxia Hui Autonomous Regional Committee of the Chinese Communist Party =

Ningxia Hui Autonomous Regional Committee of the Chinese Communist Party 中国共产党宁夏回族自治区委员会

Overview
- Type: Highest decision-making organ when Ningxia Hui Autonomous Regional Congress is not in session.
- Elected by: Ningxia Hui Autonomous Regional Congress
- Length of term: Five years
- Term limits: None
- First convocation: 18 October 1949

Leadership
- Secretary: Li Yifei
- Deputy Secretary: Zhang Yupu (Government Chairman); Zhuang Yan (Full-time Deputy Secretary)
- Secretary-General: Lei Dongsheng
- Executive organ: Standing Committee
- Inspection organ: Commission for Discipline Inspection

Ningxia Hui Autonomous Regional Committee of the Chinese Communist Party
- Simplified Chinese: 中国共产党宁夏回族自治区委员会
- Traditional Chinese: 中國共產黨寧夏回族自治區委員會
Transcriptions
Standard Mandarin
- Hanyu Pinyin: Zhōngguó Gòngchǎndǎng Níngxià Huízú Zìzhìqū Wěiyuánhuì

Abbreviation
- Simplified Chinese: 中共宁夏回族自治区委
- Traditional Chinese: 中共寧夏回族自治區委
- Literal meaning: CCP Ningxia Hui Autonomous Regional Committee
Transcriptions
Standard Mandarin
- Hanyu Pinyin: Zhōnggòng Níngxià Huízú Zìzhìqū Wěi

The Ningxia Hui Autonomous Regional Committee of the Chinese Communist Party is the regional committee of the Chinese Communist Party (CCP) in the Ningxia Hui Autonomous Region. The CCP committee secretary is the highest ranking post in the region. The current secretary is Li Yifei, who succeeded Liang Yanshun on 28 June 2024.

== History ==
On 18 October 1949, with the approval of the CCP Central Committee, the Ningxia Provincial Working Committee was established. In November 1957, with the abolition of the Ningxia Province and the creation of the Ningxia Hui Autonomous Region, the Ningxia Hui Autonomous Region Working Committee was established. In May 1958, it was renamed to become the Ningxia Hui Autonomous Region Committee.

== Organization ==
The organization of the CCP Ningxia Committee includes:

- General Office

=== Functional Departments ===
- Organization Department
- Publicity Department
- United Front Work Department
- Political and Legal Affairs Commission
- Social Work Department

=== Offices ===
- Policy Research Office
- Office of the National Security Commission
- Office of the Cyberspace Affairs Commission
- Office of the Institutional Organization Commission
- Office of the Leading Group for Inspection Work
- Bureau of Veteran Cadres

=== Dispatched institutions ===
- Working Committee of the Organs Directly Affiliated to the Ningxia Hui Regional Committee

=== Organizations directly under the Committee ===
- Ningxia Party School
- Ningxia Daily
- Ningxia Institute of Socialism
- Party History Research Office
- Ningxia Regional Archives

== Leadership ==
=== Party Committees ===
12th Regional Party Committee (June 2017 – June 2022)

- Secretary: Shi Taifeng (until 25 October 2019), Chen Run'er (25 October 2019 – 28 March 2022), Liang Yanshun (from 28 March 2022)
- Deputy Secretaries: Xian Hui (until May 2022), Jiang Zhigang (until January 2021), Chen Yong (from July 2021), Zhang Yupu (from April 2022)
- Other Standing Committee members: Xu Guangguo (until March 2018), Zhang Chaochao, Ma Shunqing (until November 2018), Xu Chuanzhi (until November 2019), Ji Zheng (until September 2018), Sheng Ronghua (until May 2019), Zhao Yongqing, Bai Shangcheng, Zhang Zhu (until September 2021), Pan Wujun (January 2018 – December 2020), Zhang Yunsheng (June 2018 – December 2020), Shi Dai (from May 2019), Li Jinke (from July 2019), Ai Juntao (from November 2019), Zhao Jianhong (from December 2020), Lei Dongsheng (from January 2021), Ma Hancheng (from April 2021), Lai Jiao (July 2021 – November 2021), Zhang Yupu (from August 2021), Mai Yanzhou (from May 2022)

13th Regional Party Committee (June 2022–)

- Secretary: Liang Yanshun (until 28 June 2024), Li Yifei (from 28 June 2024)
- Deputy Secretaries: Zhang Yupu, Chen Yong (until January 2023), Zhuang Yan (from August 2023)
- Other Standing Committee members: Ai Juntao, Lei Dongsheng, Li Jinke, Shi Dai (until October 2023), Ma Hancheng, Chen Chunping, Mai Yanzhou, Guo Jianjun, Zhao Xuhui, Wang Gang (until May 2023), Zhu Tianshu (from July 2023), Li Dongxu (from December 2023)
