= Huo Shilian =

Chinese politician (1909–1996)

- 霍士廉

Party Secretary of Shanxi
- In office 1980 – 1983
- Succeeded by: Li Ligong

Minister of Agriculture
- In office February 1979 – March 1981
- Succeeded by: Lin Hujia

Party Secretary and Chairman of Ningxia
- In office 1977 – 1979
- Preceded by: Kang Jianmin

Party Secretary of Shaanxi
- In office 1965 – 1967
- Preceded by: Hu Yaobang
- Succeeded by: Li Ruishan

Personal details
- Born: April 1909 Shaanxi, Great Qing
- Died: November 17, 1996 (aged 87) Beijing, China
- Party: Chinese Communist Party

Huo Shilian (Chinese: 霍士廉) (April 1909 – November 17, 1996) was a Chinese politician. He was born in Shanxi Province. He was Minister of Agriculture from February 1979 to March 1981. He was Chinese Communist Party (CCP) Committee Secretary of Shanxi (1980–1983) and Shaanxi (1965–1967). He was governor of Zhejiang. He was CCP Committee Secretary and Chairmen of Ningxia (1977–1979). He was a member of the 11th Central Committee of the Chinese Communist Party, 12th Central Committee of the Chinese Communist Party and the Central Advisory Commission. He was a delegate to the 1st National People's Congress, 2nd National People's Congress, 3rd National People's Congress, 4th National People's Congress and 5th National People's Congress. He was President of Zhejiang University (1953-1958). He left the public eye in 1987. He died in Beijing at the age of 87.

Educational offices
Preceded by Sha Wenhan	President of Zhejiang University; 1953–1958	Succeeded by Zhou Rongxin
Government offices
Preceded by Sha Wenhan	Governor of Zhejiang; 1957–1958	Succeeded by Zhou Jianren
Preceded by Kang Jianmin	Chairman of Ningxia; 1977–1979	Succeeded by Ma Xin
Preceded by Yang Ligong	Minister of Agriculture; 1979 – 1981	Succeeded by Lin Hujia
Party political offices
Preceded by Hu Yaobang	Party Secretary of Shaanxi; 1965–1967	Succeeded by Li Ruishan
Preceded by Kang Jianmin	Party Secretary of Ningxia; 1977–1979	Succeeded by Li Xuezhi
Preceded by Wang Qian	Party Secretary of Shanxi; 1980–1983	Succeeded by Li Ligong
Military offices
Preceded by Wang Qian	Political commissar of the Shanxi Military District; 1980–1983	Succeeded by Li Ligong
