= Zhang Yi (politician) =

Chinese politician

- 张毅

Party Secretary of Ningxia
- In office July 2010 – March 2013
- Preceded by: Chen Jianguo
- Succeeded by: Li Jianhua

Deputy Secretary of the Central Commission for Discipline Inspection
- In office 21 October 2007 – 15 November 2012

Secretary General of the Central Commission for Discipline Inspection
- In office September – November 2007
- Preceded by: Gan Yisheng
- Succeeded by: Wu Yuliang

Personal details
- Born: August 1950 (age 75)
- Party: Chinese Communist Party

Zhang Yi (Chinese: 张毅; born August 1950) is a Chinese politician. He was the Director of the State-owned Assets Supervision and Administration Commission, and the former Party Secretary of Ningxia.

== Career ==
Zhang Yi was born in Bei'an County, Heilongjiang province. When he was 19, he began working at the forestry farm in Huma County, performing manual labour. He joined the Chinese Communist Party in February 1972. In 1984, he became the mayor and then Communist Party Chief of Tahe County, Heilongjiang province. In October 1990, he was promoted to party chief of Da Hinggan Ling Prefecture. In May 2001, he became a deputy party chief of Heilongjiang province.

In November 2006, Zhang was transferred to Hebei province, where he remained a deputy party chief. In September 2007, he was transferred to the central government where he was a deputy secretary of the Central Commission for Discipline Inspection of the Chinese Communist Party.

In July 2010, Zhang was appointed Communist Party Chief of Ningxia Hui Autonomous Region, replacing retiring Chen Jianguo as the top leader of the province-level region. In August he took the additional post as Chairman of Ningxia People's Congress. He took charge of the State-owned Assets Supervision and Administration Commission, succeeding Jiang Jiemin, who had been arrested on corruption charges. He served in the post for some three years, before leaving active politics in December 2016 upon reaching retirement age. He was then transferred to serve on the National People's Congress Internal and Judicial Affairs Committee.

Zhang is a member of the 18th Central Committee of the Chinese Communist Party.

Government offices
Preceded by Jiang Jiemin	Director of the State-owned Assets Supervision and Administration Commission of the State Council; 2013–2016	Succeeded by Xiao Yaqing
Party political offices
Preceded by Chen Jianguo	Party Secretary of Ningxia; 2010–2013	Succeeded by Li Jianhua
Preceded by Gao Yisheng	Secretary General of the Central Commission for Discipline Inspection; 2007	Succeeded by Wu Yuliang
