= Chinese Communist Party Provincial Standing Committee =

Province-level position in the Chinese Communist Party

Provincial Standing Committee of the Chinese Communist Party 中国共产党省委常委

Information
- Elected by: Provincial Congress of the Chinese Communist Party
- Responsible to: Central Committee of the Chinese Communist Party
- Parent: Chinese Communist Party

Members of the standing committees of the Chinese Communist Party provincial-level committees, commonly referred to as Shengwei Changwei (Chinese: 省委常委; pinyin: shěngwěi chángwěi), make up the top ranks of the provincial-level organizations of the Chinese Communist Party (CCP). In theory, the Standing Committee of a Party Committee manages the day-to-day party affairs of a provincial party organization, and are selected from the members of the provincial-level Party Committee at large. In practice, Shengwei Changwei is a position with significant political power, and their appointments are essentially directed by the central leadership through the Organization Department of the Chinese Communist Party.

== Terminology ==
- Shengwei Changwei (省委常委), technically, only refer to Standing Committee members of a province. Standing Committee members of the four direct-controlled municipalities are known as Shiwei Changwei (市委常委). Standing Committee members of the autonomous regions are known as Zizhiqu Dangwei Changwei (自治区党委常委) or Qu Dangwei Changwei (区党委常委) for short.
- Changweihui (常委会): The Standing Committee, or, alternatively, a meeting of the Standing Committee (depending on the context in which this term is used)
- Ruchang (入常): to be selected to join the Standing Committee, or to enter the Standing Committee. The same term can be used for Politburo Standing Committee members. This term is an abbreviation, and became popular during the internet era.
- Shengwei Weiyuan (省委委员) refers to a member of the provincial-level Party Committee, which is distinct from the Standing Committee. Standing Committee members are selected from members of the Party Committee.

== Membership and rankings ==
In each province, direct-controlled municipality, or autonomous region, membership in a Standing Committee ranges between 11 and 15 individuals. The leading members are ranked by the office they hold. The Party Secretary (or party chief) is ranked first, followed by the head of government (called a "governor" in provinces, but a "mayor" in municipalities and "chairman" in autonomous regions), always ranked second, and a zhuanzhi Deputy Party Secretary (that is, a "full-time" deputy party chief who oversees party affairs) is always ranked third. Often, but not always, a discipline inspection secretary is ranked fourth. Apart from these established ranking conventions, the remaining ranks of the Standing Committees are ordered by the date of advancement to the sub-provincial (vice-minister) level (among other things).

In general, the heads of the provincial-level Organization Department (in charge of human resources and personnel) and Propaganda Department (in charge of disseminating the party's agenda) earn ex officio seats on the provincial-level Standing Committee. Usually, the head of the Zhengfawei (i.e., Political and Legal Affairs Commission), the Secretary of Discipline Inspection, the party committee's Secretary-General, a representative from the military (usually, a commissar or a commanding officer of the local military district), and the first-ranked deputy head of government also have seats on the Standing Committee. In the provinces and autonomous regions, the party chiefs of the provincial capital also usually sit on the Standing Committee. The party chiefs of other large subdivisions may also sit on the Standing Committee, although this is not a strict rule. Occasionally, the head of the provincial-level United Front Department and the chair of the provincial Federation of Trade Unions organization also holds a seat on the Standing Committee.

Shengwei Changwei are considered sub-provincial-level (fushengji) officials, meaning their ranks are equivalent to that of a deputy provincial governor or a vice minister of the state. Where both Shengwei Changwei and provincial vice-governors (who are not also Shengwei Changwei) are present, the Shengwei Changwei ranks above the vice-governor. Provincial Standing Committee members are accorded fushengji rank if their concurrent post does not already afford them an equal or higher rank. For example, the party chief of Xining, capital of Qinghai province, would otherwise be considered a department-level (tingjuji) official but the fact that he sits on the provincial Standing Committee makes him rank one level higher; in fact, he would actually rank higher than an ordinary provincial vice-governor who does not sit on the Standing Committee. Conversely, the party chief of Beijing is usually also a Politburo member. He, therefore, holds a sub-national rank by virtue of his Politburo membership, which is two ranks above a typical Shengwei Changwei.

== Qualifications and composition ==
The gradual 'professionalization' of Communist Party cadres began in the 1990s, which meant that more emphasis was placed on candidate's educational background as well as seniority of experience. For example, many of those promoted from the turn of the century onward had master's or doctorate degrees in fields such as economics. By the time of the Xi Jinping years, having a master's degree had become essentially a "standard requirement" for promotion to a provincial Standing Committee, with some of those promoted having academic experiences at the world's top universities. The type of degrees varied; although Masters of Business Administration (MBAs) were common, others had engineering or medical backgrounds.

=== Age ===
In terms of age, nearly all Shengwei Changwei who are not concurrently serving as party chief or head of government are between 45 and 60 years of age. It is general convention in the CCP that officials of sub-provincial (vice minister) rank retire at age 60. Unless they advance to full provincial rank, for example, by becoming a Governor, a provincial party chief, or a minister of the state, they usually relinquish their posts at age 60. On the other hand, officials below 45 years of age have next to no chances of making it to this elite level of the party organization. For example, as of 2017, the youngest person with a seat on a provincial Standing Committee was the Secretary-General of the Shanghai party organization, Zhuge Yujie (born 1971), who was 46 years old at the time of his appointment. The effect of this is that Shengwei Changwei usually sit on the body for no more than three terms (each term is five years). The pace of turnover in membership is rapid: departures occur frequently as members reach retirement age or as individuals are transferred to another province or a ministerial post.

=== Regional profiles and ethnic minorities ===
Unlike party chiefs and governors, who usually serve in a variety of locales during their careers, many Shengwei Changwei are "native" to the province in which they serve. There are notable exceptions to this. For example, in Shanxi province following the "earthquake" that shook its political establishment in 2014, when the majority of the provincial Standing Committee was rounded up for investigation, removed from the body, or transferred. The 'renewed' committee was made up of people mostly not native to Shanxi province. Since Xi Jinping's assuming the General Secretary of the Chinese Communist Party in November 2012, many provinces have also seen Discipline Inspection chiefs being appointed by the centre and "parachuted" into their roles in the provinces.

=== Gender ===
As of July 2017, 35 of the 375 shengwei changwei were female. Of the provinces, Hunan had the highest representation of female shengwei changwei in the country: three members on the Hunan standing committee were women. 80% of female shengwei changwei had previous experience as the party chief of prefecture-level cities or equivalent jurisdictions. The majority of female shengwei changwei served as the heads of provincial party departments, such as United Front, Propaganda, Organization, or as leaders of discipline inspection. As of 2018, three women, Bu Xiaolin, Shen Yiqin, and Xian Hui (curiously, all ethnic minorities), served as the heads of government; He Rong, Huang Lixin, Ulan, and Yu Hongqiu served as deputy party chiefs - a post with substantial clout.

== List ==
As of July 2024, provincial-level Standing Committee members of the CCP shown below.

Note: Hong Kong, Macau, and the territories that are controlled by the Republic of China are excluded from this list.

List of provincial-level Standing Committee members of the Chinese Communist Party
– Municipalities –
Division	Seats	Secretary	Head of Government (Note: The head of government in each locale also always serves as the senior-ranked Deputy Party Secretary.)	Deputy Secretary (Note: Where necessary, to distinguish between the head-of-government deputy secretary and the junior deputy secretary, the latter is referred to with the designation zhuanzhi shuji, in which zhuanzhi roughly means "full-time" or "holds this office specifically".)	Other members
Beijing	13	Yin Li (Politburo)	Yin Yong	Liu Wei	You Jun (HOD), Chen Jian (SDI), Xia Linmao (VM), Fu Wenhua (PLA), Yang Jinbai (UFD), Qi Wei (VM), Sun Junmin (ZFW), Zhao Lei (Sec-Gen), Yu Yingjie
Chongqing	12	Yuan Jiajun (Politburo)	Hu Henghua	Li Mingqing	Lu Kehua (ZFW), Song Yijia (SDI), Jiang Hui (HPD), Cai Yunge (HOD), Lu Hong (UFD), Luo Lin (Liangjiang New Area), Chen Xinwu (Sec-Gen, EVM), Wang Yanqi (PLA)
Shanghai	13	Chen Jining (Politburo)	Gong Zheng	vacant	Li Yangzhe (SDI), Zhao Jiaming (HPD), Chen Tong (UFD), Zhu Zhisong (Pudong New Area), Zhang Wei (HOD), Chen Jinshan (Lingang New City), Hu Shijun (PLA), Li Zheng (Sec-Gen), Hua Yuan (VM)
Tianjin	11	Chen Min'er (Politburo)	Zhang Gong	Chen Fukuan	Liu Guiping (EVM), Ji Guoqiang (UFD), Lian Maojun (Binhai New Area), Wang Tingkai (SDI), Zhou Derui (HOD), Wang Xu (Hexi), Shen Lei (HPD), Wang Lijun (Sec-Gen), Heng Xiaofan (ZFW)
– Provinces –
Anhui	13	Liang Yanshun	Wang Qingxian	Yu Aihua (ZFW)	Zhang Ximing (UFD), Liu Haiquan (SDI), Ding Xiangqun (HOD), Fei Gaoyun (VG), Zhang Hongwen (Hefei), Qian Sanxiong (HPD), Liu Guobin (PLA)
Fujian	12	Zhou Zuyi	Zhao Long	Luo Dongchuan	Zhang Yan (HPD), Chi Yaoyun (SDI), Cui Yonghui (Xiamen), Guo Ningning (Fuzhou), Wu Xielin (Sec-Gen), Song Hongxi (PLA), Wang Yongli (UFD), Huang Haikun (ZFW)
Gansu	11	Hu Changsheng	Ren Zhenhe	Shi Moujun	Wang Fu (SDI), Cheng Xiaobo (VG), Sun Xuetao (UFD), Liu Changgen (ZFW), Zhang Jingang (VG), Zhang Yongxia (HPD), Zhang Xiaoqiang (Lanzhou), Zhang Wei (Sec-Gen), Liu Jianwei (PLA), Li Gang (HOD)
Guangdong	13	Huang Kunming (Politburo)	Wang Weizhong	Meng Fanli (Shenzhen)	Song Fulong (SDI), Chen Jianwen (HPD), Zhang Hu (VG), Wang Xi (VG), Guo Yonghang (Guangzhou), Yuan Gujie (ZFW), Zhang Gong (PLA)
Guizhou	12	Xu Lin	Li Bingjun	Shi Guanghui (ZFW)	Li Yuanping (SDI), Lu Yongzheng (HPD), Wu Qiang (EVG), Hu Zhongxiong (Guiyang), Guo Qiang (UFD), Wu Shenghua (Bijie), Li Rui (Zunyi), Shi Yubao (HOD), Wang Lei (PLA), Guo Xiwen (Sec-Gen)
Hainan	13	Feng Fei	Liu Xiaoming	Shen Danyang (ZFW)	Chen Guomeng (SDI), Zhou Hongbo (Sanya), Wang Bin (HPD), Luo Zengbin (Haikou), Bagatur (EVG), Wang Peijie (PLA), Ni Qiang (Sec-Gen)
Hebei	13	Ni Yuefeng	Wang Zhengpu	Wang Lujin	Zhang Chaochao (Shijiazhuang), Liu Changhua (SDI), Zhang Guohua (Xiong'an New Area), Ke Jun (HOD), Zuo Li (UFD), Dong Xiaoyu (ZFW), Wu Weidong (Tangshan), Zhang Chengzhong (VG), Chang Bin (HPD), Fu Xiaodong (PLA)
Heilongjiang	13	Xu Qin	Liang Huiling	Zhang Anshun	Liu Hui (ZFW), Xu Jianguo (UFD), Yang Bo (HOD), Bian Xuewen (SDI), He Liangjun (HPD), Chen Shaobo (VG), Yu Hongtao (Harbin), Xu Xiangguo (Sec-Gen), Zhao Zhong (PLA)
Henan	11	Lou Yangsheng	Wang Kai	Sun Meijun (ZFW)	Sun Shougang (VG), Jiang Ling (Luoyang), Zhang Wei (SDI), Wang Zhanying (HPD), Chen Xing (Sec-Gen), An Wei (Zhengzhou), Wang Gang (HPD), Zhang Leiming (HOD)
Hubei	10	Wang Menghui	Wang Zhonglin	Zhuge Yujie	Hou Ximin (SDI), Guo Yuanqiang (Wuhan), Zhang Wenbing (HOD), Xiao Juhua (ZFW), Ning Yong (UFD), Wang Qiyang (Xiangyang), Ju Chaohui (HPD), Shao Xinyu (VG), Wu Haitao (Sec-Gen)
Hunan	12	Shen Xiaoming	Mao Weiming	Li Dianxun	Wang Shuangquan (SDI), Wu Guiying (Changsha), Sui Zhongcheng (UFD), Xie Weijiang (Yueyang), Wei Jianfeng (ZFW), Yang Haodong (HPD), Wang Yiguang (HOD), Zhang Yingchun (EVG), Wang Yu (PLA), Qin Guowen (Sec-Gen)
Jiangsu	13	Xin Changxing	Xu Kunlin	Vacant	Zhang Zhong (SDI), Han Liming (Nanjing), Liu Xiaotao (Suzhou), Liu Jianyang (ZFW), Chu Yonghong (Sec-Gen), Ma Xin (VG), Zhang Guocheng (PLA), Hu Guangjie (UFD), Xu Ying (HPD)
Jiangxi	12	Yin Hong	Ye Jianchun	Wu Zhongqiong (Ganzhou)	Liang Gui, Ma Senshu (SDI), Li Hongjun (Nanchang), Luo Xiaoyun (ZFW), Ren Zhufeng (VG), Zhuang Zhaolin (HOD), Bao Zemin (PLA), Huang Xizhong (UFD), Chen Min (Sec-Gen), Lu Xiaoqing (HPD)
Jilin	12	Huang Qiang	Hu Yuting	Wu Haiying	Hu Jiafu (Yanbian), Cai Dong (EVG), Zhang Enhui (Changchun), Han Fuchun (UFD), Li Wei (Sec-Gen), Shi Wenbin (SDI), Cao Lubao (HPD), Li Mingwei (ZFW), Wang Qiushi (HOD), Xi Shuangzhu (PLA)
Liaoning	12	Hao Peng	Li Lecheng	Wang Xinwei (Shenyang)	Liu Huiyan (HPD), Wang Jian (VG), Xiong Maoping (Dalian), Li Meng (SDI), Liang Ping (PLA), Zhang Lilin (VG), Sui Qing (UFD), Jiang Tianbao (HOD), Jiang Youwei (Sec-Gen), Huo Bugang (ZFW)
Qinghai	13	Chen Gang	Wu Xiaojun	Liu Qifan	Liu Meipin (SDI), Wang Weidong (Xining), Zhao Yuexia (HOD), Cêringtar (VG), Yang Fasen (ZFW), Wang Danan (HPD), Wang Linhu (VG), Urazbek Resulikhan (Haidong), Baiko (UFD), Zhu Xiangfeng (Sec-Gen), Yang Longxi (PLA)
Shaanxi	14	Zhao Yide	Zhao Gang	Xing Shanping	Wang Xiao (VG), Wang Xingning (SDI), Fang Hongwei (Xi'an), Guo Yonghong (HOD), Sun Daguang (HPD), Liu Qiang (ZFW), Hao Huijie (Yan'an), Li Mingyuan (UFD)
Shandong	11	Lin Wu	Zhou Naixiang	Vacant	Xu Hairong (UFD), Xia Hongmin (SDI), Bai Yugang (HPD), Wang Yuyan (HOD), Liu Qiang (Jinan), Zeng Zanrong (Qingdao), Wang Aiguo (PLA), Zhang Haibo (VG), Jiang Cheng (Yantai), Fan Bo (Sec-Gen)
Shanxi	12	Tang Dengjie	Jin Xiangjun	Zhang Chunlin	Wang Yongjun (SDI), Zhang Jifu (HPD), Li Fengqi (Sec-Gen), Wu Wei (VG), Lu Dongliang (Datong), Wei Tao (Taiyuan), Zheng Liansheng (ZFW), Hu Lijie (HOD), Xu Baolong (PLA)
Sichuan	13	Wang Xiaohui	Shi Xiaolin	Vacant	Liao Jianyu (SDI), Yu Lijun (HOD), Tian Xiaowei (PLA), Cao Lijun (Mianyang), Chen Yi (Sec-Gen), Dong Weimin (VG), Purpu Tonchup (VG), Zhao Junmin (UFD), Qi Lei (ZFW), Zheng Li (HPD)
Yunnan	12	Wang Ning	Wang Yubo	Shi Yugang	Feng Zhili (SDI), Liu Hongjian (Kunming), Yang Yalin (ZFW), Qiu Jiang (Sec-Gen), Liu Fei (HOD), Zeng Yan (HPD), Zheng Zhongquan (PLA), Yang Bin (Qujing), Zhang Zhili (UFD)
Zhejiang	11	Yi Lianhong	Wang Hao	Liu Jie (Hangzhou)	Peng Jiaxue (Ningbo), Wang Cheng (HOD), Fu Mingxian (SDI), Xu Wenguang (EVG), Qiu Qiwen (Sec-Gen), Wang Chengguo (ZFW), Zhao Cheng (HPD), Wang Wenxu (UFD), Sun Wenju (PLA)
– Autonomous Regions –
Guangxi	13	Liu Ning	Lan Tianli	Vacant	He Wenhao (ZFW), Fang Lingmin (SDI), Chen Yijun (HPD), Wang Weiping (HOD), Wang Xinfu (UFD), Nong Shengwen (Nanning), Xu Yongke (EVC), Zhou Yijue (Sec-Gen)
Inner Mongolia	12	Sun Shaocheng	Wang Lixia	Vacant	Liu Shuang (SDI), Bao Gang (Hohhot), Zheng Hongfan (SPI), Ding Xiufeng (Baotou), Meng Xiandong (Tongliao), Yang Xiaokang (PLA), Huang Zhiqiang (EVC), Li Yugang (HPD), Küudaɣula (UFD), Yu Lixin (Sec-Gen)
Ningxia	11	Li Yifei	Zhang Yupu	Zhuang Yan	Ai Juntao (SDI), Lei Dongsheng (Sec-Gen), Li Jinke (HPD), Ma Hancheng (UFD), Zhu Tianshu (ZFW), Chen Chunping (EVC), Mai Yanzhou (VC), Guo Jianjun (PLA), Zhao Xuhui (Yinchuan), Li Dongxu (HOD)
Tibet	14	Wang Junzheng	Yan Jinhai	Chen Yongqi (EVC), Liu Jiang (ZFW)	Yin Hongxing (PLA), Wang Haizhou (HPD), Lai Jiao (HOD), Ren Wei (EVC), Garma Cedain (UFD), Xiao Youcai (Lhasa), Dawa Ciring (Sec-Gen)
Xinjiang	15	Ma Xingrui (Politburo)	Erkin Tuniyaz	He Zhongyou (Ürümqi), Zhang Zhu (HOD)	Yang Cheng (PLA), Tian Xiangli (SDI), Chen Weijun (EVC), Chen Mingguo (ZFW), Wang Jiannxin (HPD), Yüsüpjan Memet (VC), Ilzat Exmetjan (UFD), Qadan Käbenuly (Sec-Gen)
List of Abbreviations: EVG (EVM, EVC): Executive Vice Governor (Executive Vice Mayor, Executive Vice Chairman); SDI: Secretary of the CPC Provincial Commission for Discipline Inspection; HOD: Head of the CPC Provincial Committee Organisation Department; HPD: Head of the CPC Provincial Committee Publicity Department; VG (VM, VC): Vice Governor (Vice Mayor, Vice Chairman); ZFW: Secretary of the CPC Provincial Political and Legal Affairs Commission (Zhengfawei); Sec-Gen: Secretary-General of the CPC Provincial Committee; UFD: Head of the CPC Provincial Committee United Front Work Department; PLA: Commander of the PLA Military Area Command; Union: President of the Provincial Federation of Trade Unions; PC: Vice Chairman of the Provincial/Autonomous Regional People's Congress Standing Committee; XPCC: Secretary of the CPC Xinjiang Production and Construction Corps Committee; Place names (e.g. Dalian) in parentheses represent Secretary of the CPC Committee of that jurisdiction

== Standing Committees below provincial level ==
Below the provincial-level, all administrative jurisdictions down to the county level all have their respective Party Standing Committees (Chinese: 党委常务委员会 or 党委常委会 for short). Like their provincial counterparts, these committees serve as the de facto highest local leadership council of the Chinese Communist Party in any area of jurisdiction. The composition of the council can be compared to the Politburo Standing Committee, the de facto highest decision-making body of the country, but is not exactly the same. Local Standing Committees function as the highest policy making body within the party, but technically do not have executive powers of the government constitutionally.

The Standing Committee should not be confused with a "Party Committee" (党委), which is a distinct institution. A local Party Committee is a body composed of a much larger number of officials compared to the Party Standing Committee.

In general, the Party Standing Committee includes those concurrently holding the following positions:

1. Party Committee Secretary (also known as "party chief")
2. Deputy Party Secretary, Governor (Mayor)
3. Discipline Inspection Secretary
4. Politics and Legal Affairs Secretary
5. Executive Vice Governor (Vice Mayor)
6. Head of local Organization Department
7. Head of local Propaganda Department
8. Secretary-General
9. Party Secretaries of the largest subdivisions within the jurisdiction

== See also ==
- Central Committee of the Chinese Communist Party
- Communist Party Secretary
- Deputy Communist Party Secretary
