= Bai Lichen =

Chinese politician

- 白立忱
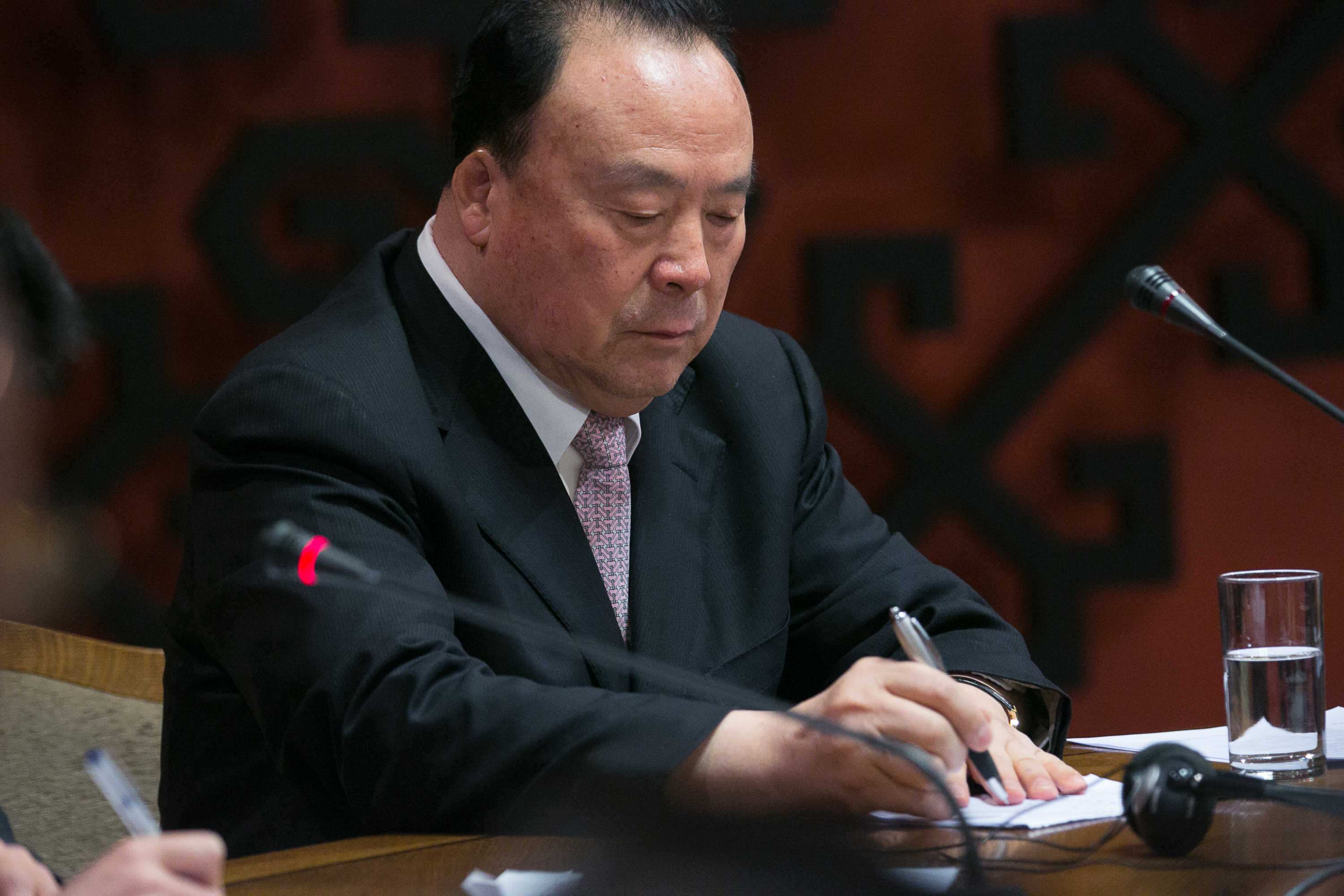
- Bai Lichen in December 2012
- Born: January 1941 (age 84–85); Lingyuan, Liaoning Province, China
- Education: Shenyang Institute of Agriculture
- Occupation: politician
- Known for: former chairman of Ningxia Hui Autonomous Region, former president of All China Federation of Supply and Marketing Cooperatives, Vice Chairman of the Chinese People's Political Consultative Conference (CPPCC)
- Political party: Chinese Communist Party

Bai Lichen (Chinese: 白立忱, Xiao'erjing: ﺑَﻰْ لِ چٌ; born January 1941) is a retired Chinese politician of Hui ethnicity, and the former chairman of Ningxia Hui Autonomous Region and the former president of All China Federation of Supply and Marketing Cooperatives. He was Vice Chairman of the Chinese People's Political Consultative Conference (CPPCC) between 1998 and 2013.

== Biography ==
Born in Lingyuan, Liaoning Province, Bai graduated from department of agricultural engineering of Shenyang Institute of Agriculture in 1964, majoring in agricultural mechanization. He joined the Chinese Communist Party in April 1971. From 1964 to 1968, he was a technician in the Institute of Agricultural Mechanization in Yingkou of Liaoning. He was then sent to work in rural areas.

From 1972 to 1980, Bai was an official in the organization department of the Yingkou municipal party committee, and vice section chief of personnel bureau of Yingkou. In 1980, he was elevated to vice secretary and later, secretary of CPC committee in Suburbs District of Yingkou. In 1983, he became mayor and vice Party chief of Yingkou. In 1984, Bai was appointed secretary of CPC Panjin municipal committee, and assistant to the Governor of Liaoning. In 1985, he was elevated to the Liaoning provincial party standing committee, and vice governor of Liaoning. In 1986, Bai was transferred to Ningxia Hui Autonomous Region, and became Deputy Communist Party Secretary of Ningxia, and the acting chairman of Ningxia. He was confirmed as chairman of Ningxia in 1987, and served in this post for 10 years.

In 1997, Bai was appointed the leader of the Party group of the All China Federation of Supply and Marketing Cooperatives. In 1998, he became the president of the Federation and was also elected as vice chairman of the Chinese People's Political Consultative Conference.

Bai was a member of 13th, 14th, 15th, 16th and 17th Central Committees of the Chinese Communist Party. He has also been the vice chairman of 9th to 11th CPPCC.
