= Liang Yanshun =

Chinese politician (born 1962)

- 梁言顺
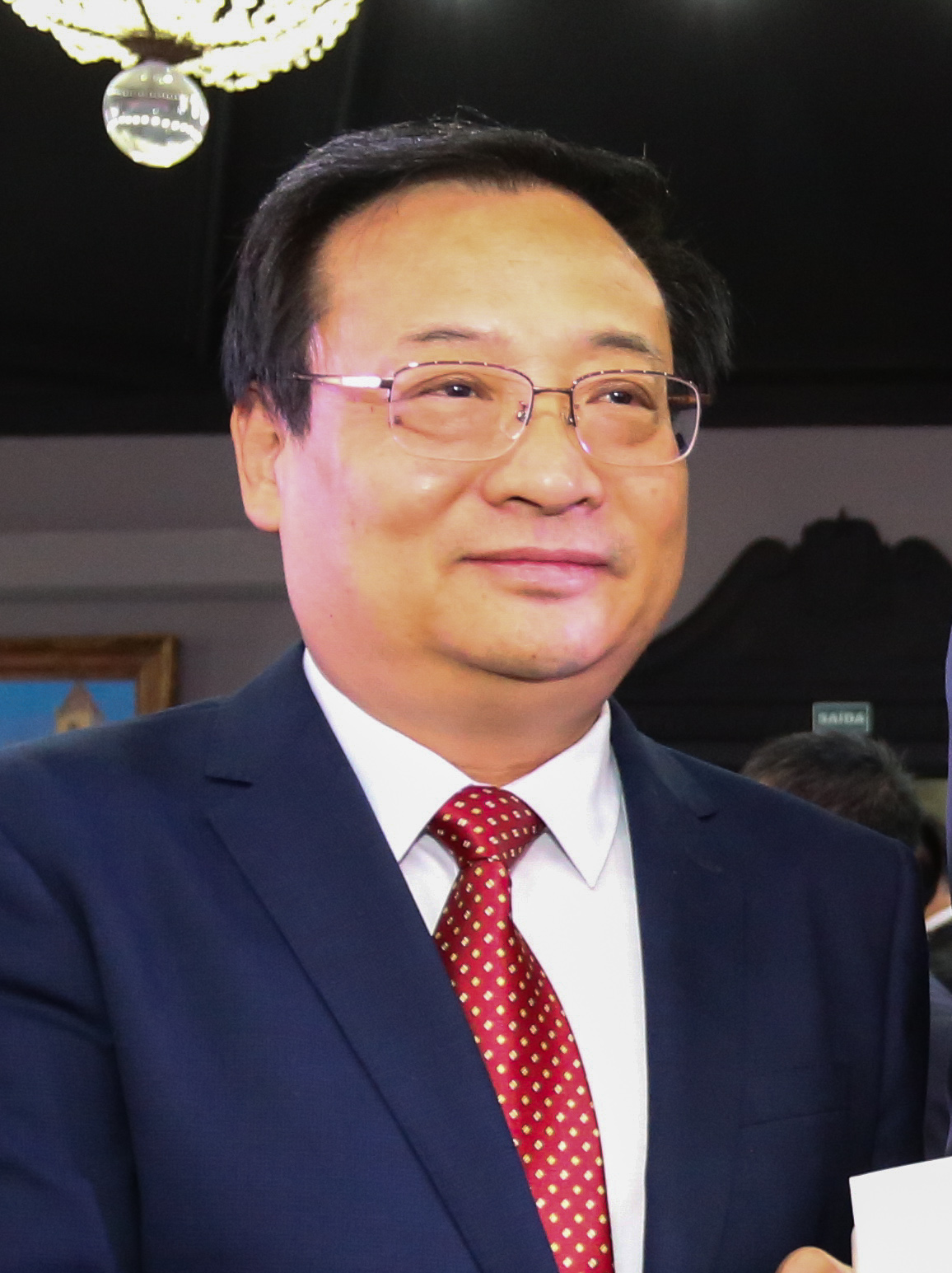

Party Secretary of Anhui
- In office 28 June 2024 – 23 September 2026
- Deputy: Wang Qingxian (Governor)
- Preceded by: Han Jun
- Succeeded by: Li Lecheng

Chairperson of Ningxia Hui Autonomous Regional People's Congress
- In office May 2022 – June 2024
- Preceded by: Chen Run'er
- Succeeded by: Li Yifei

Party Secretary of Ningxia
- In office 28 March 2022 – 28 June 2024
- Deputy: Xian Hui (chairwoman); Zhang Yupu (chairman)
- Preceded by: Chen Run'er
- Succeeded by: Li Yifei

Personal details
- Born: December 1962 (age 63) Tai'an, Shandong, China
- Party: Chinese Communist Party
- Education: SDUT; Liaoning University; Central Party School

Chinese name
- Simplified Chinese: 梁言顺
- Traditional Chinese: 梁言順
Transcriptions
Standard Mandarin
- Hanyu Pinyin: Liáng Yánshùn

Liang Yanshun (Chinese: 梁言顺; born December 1962) is a Chinese politician who served as Party Secretary of Anhui from 2024 to 2026. He was Party Secretary of Ningxia between March 2022 and June 2024.

== Early life and education ==
Liang was born in Tai'an, Shandong, in December 1962. After resuming the college entrance examination in 1979, he was accepted to Shandong Institute of Agricultural Mechanization (now Shandong University of Technology), majoring in agricultural mechanization. After graduating in 1983, he stayed and worked at the university. In 1989, he entered Liaoning University, earning a master's in economics in 1992.

== Career ==
Liang joined the Chinese Communist Party (CCP) in February 1985, and began his political career in the Central Party School of the Chinese Communist Party in July 1992.

In January 2016, he was appointed head of the Publicity Department of CCP Gansu Provincial Committee and was admitted to member of the standing committee of the CCP Gansu Provincial Committee, the province's top authority. One year later, he became head of the Organization Department of CCP Gansu Provincial Committee, but having held the position for only ten months.

In December 2017, he was made deputy secretary of the CCP Central Committee State Organs Work Committee, and held that office until July 2018, when he was named head of the Publicity Department of the Chinese Communist Party. In October 2020, he was recalled to the State Organs Work Committee of CCCPC and appointed executive deputy secretary.

On 28 March 2022, he was transferred to northwest China's Ningxia and was promoted to party secretary, the top political position in the region.

On 28 June 2024, Liang was appointed party secretary of Anhui, succeeding Han Jun. He stepped down from the position on 23 September 2026. On 6 November 2026, he was appointed as the vice chairman of the National People's Congress Education, Science, Culture and Health Committee at the 25th meeting of the Standing Committee of the 14th National People's Congress.

Party political offices
| Preceded by Lian Ji | Head of the Publicity Department of CCP Gansu Provincial Committee; 2016–2017 | Succeeded by Chen Qing |
| Preceded by Wu Degang | Head of the Organization Department of CCP Gansu Provincial Committee; 2017–2018 | Succeeded by Li Yuanping |
| Preceded by Meng Xiangfeng | Executive Deputy Secretary of the Central and State Organs Working Committee of the Central Committee; 2020–2022 | Succeeded by Wu Hansheng |
| Preceded by Chen Run'er | Party Secretary of Ningxia; 2022–2024 | Succeeded by Li Yifei |
| Preceded by Han Jun | Party Secretary of Anhui; 2024–present | Incumbent |
Assembly seats
| Preceded by Chen Run'er | Chairperson of Ningxia Hui Autonomous Regional People's Congress; 2022–2024 | Succeeded by Li Yifei |
