= Li Ligong =

Chinese revolutionist and politician (1925–2020)

- 李立功
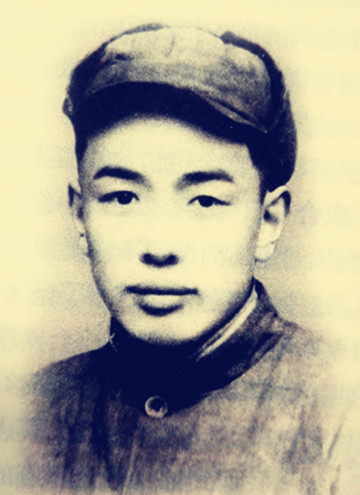

Member of the Standing Committee of the 8th National People's Congress
- In office 27 March 1993 – 16 March 1998
- Chairman: Qiao Shi

Member of the 13th Central Committee of the Chinese Communist Party
- In office October 1987 – October 1992
- General-Secretary: Zhao Ziyang→Jiang Zemin

Party Secretary of Shanxi
- In office March 1983 – March 1991
- Preceded by: Huo Shilian
- Succeeded by: Wang Maolin

Political Commissar of Shanxi Military District
- In office March 1983 – July 1985
- Preceded by: Huo Shilian
- Succeeded by: Luo Jinghui

Member of the 12th Central Committee of the Chinese Communist Party
- In office September 1982 – October 1987
- General-Secretary: Hu Yaobang

Personal details
- Born: February 1925 Jiaocheng County, Shanxi, China
- Died: December 6, 2020 (aged 95) Taiyuan, Shanxi, China
- Party: Chinese Communist Party
- Occupation: Revolutionist, politician

Li Ligong (Chinese: 李立功; pinyin: Lǐ Lìgōng; February 1925 – 6 December 2020) was a Chinese revolutionist and politician.

== Biography ==
He was born in Jiaocheng County, Shanxi, in February 1925. He was Chinese Communist Party Committee Secretary of his home province (1983–1991) and political commissar of the People's Liberation Army Shanxi Military District (1983–1985). He was a member of the 12th Central Committee of the Chinese Communist Party (1982–1987) and 13th Central Committee of the Chinese Communist Party (1987–1992). He was a delegate to the 7th National People's Congress (1988-1993) and 8th National People's Congress (1993–1998).

On December 6, 2020, he died of illness in Taiyuan, Shanxi, aged 95.

Military offices
Preceded by Huo Shilian	Political Commissar of Shanxi Military District; 1983–1985	Succeeded by Luo Jinghui
Party political offices
Preceded by Huo Shilian	Party Secretary of Shanxi; 1983–1991	Succeeded by Wang Maolin
