= Kang Jianmin =

Chinese politician

Kang Jianmin (Chinese: 康健民) (1916–1977) original name Kang Tingwen (Chinese: 康廷文), other name Kang Tianmin (Chinese: 康天民), was a Chinese politician and People's Liberation Army major general. He was born in Yuzhong County, Gansu Province. He was Chinese Communist Party Committee Secretary and Chairman of Ningxia. He died on January 18, 1977, in Renchuan.

Preceded by Yang Jingren	Communist Party Chief of Ningxia	Succeeded by Huo Shilian
