= Ma Hancheng =

Chinese politician (born 1968)

- 马汉成

Head of the United Front Work Department of the Hui Autonomous Regional Committee of the Chinese Communist Party
- Incumbent
- Assumed office March 2022
- Preceded by: Bai Shangcheng

Communist Party Secretary of Guyuan
- In office April 2021 – March 2022
- Preceded by: Zhang Zhu
- Succeeded by: Xian Guoyi

Mayor of Guyuan
- In office October 2012 – May 2021
- Preceded by: Bai Shangcheng
- Succeeded by: Xian Guoyi

Personal details
- Born: January 1968 (age 58) Tongxin County, Ningxia, China
- Party: Chinese Communist Party
- Education: Minzu University of China; Central Party School of the Chinese Communist Party

Chinese name
- Simplified Chinese: 马汉成
- Traditional Chinese: 馬漢成
Transcriptions
Standard Mandarin
- Hanyu Pinyin: Mǎ Hànchéng

Ma Hancheng (Chinese: 马汉成; born January 1968) is a Chinese politician of Hui descent, currently serving as deputy party branch secretary of the Ningxia Hui Autonomous Regional Committee of the Chinese People's Political Consultative Conference and head of the United Front Work Department.

He was a delegate to the 12th and 13th National People's Congress. He is a member of the 14th National Committee of the Chinese People's Political Consultative Conference. He is a representative of the 20th National Congress of the Chinese Communist Party and an alternate of the 20th Central Committee of the Chinese Communist Party.

== Early life and education ==
Ma was born in Tongxin County, Ningxia, in January 1968. In 1986, he enrolled at the Minzu University of China, where he majored in economic management. From June 2003 to June 2005 he did his postgraduate work at the Central Party School of the Chinese Communist Party.

== Career ==
Ma joined the Chinese Communist Party (CCP) in December 1987 in his sophomore year.

Starting in 1990, he served in several posts in Ningxia Hui Autonomous Region Planning Commission (later was reshuffled as Ningxia Hui Autonomous Region Development and Reform Commission), including deputy director of the Industrial Department, deputy director of the Office, and director of the Office.

He was director of the Management Committee of Ningdong Energy and Chemical Industry Base in September 2005, in addition to serving as deputy party secretary. He also served as party secretary of Lingwu from June 2007 to November 2009.

He was appointed vice mayor of Shizuishan in November 2009 and was admitted to member of the CCP Shizuishan Municipal Committee, the city's top authority. He was made deputy party secretary in October 2012, concurrently serving as secretary of the Political and Legal Affairs Commission.

In October 2012, he was named acting mayor of Guyuan, concurrently holding the deputy party secretary position. In January 2018, he was promoted to vice chairman of Ningxia and in April 2021 was admitted to member of the CCP Ningxia Hui Autonomous Regional Committee, the region's top authority. He also served as party secretary of Guyuan between April 2021 and March 2022.

He was chosen as deputy party branch secretary of the Ningxia Hui Autonomous Regional Committee of the Chinese People's Political Consultative Conference and head of the United Front Work Department in March 2022.

Government offices
Preceded by Bai Shangcheng	Mayor of Guyuan; 2012–2021	Succeeded by Xian Guoyi
Party political offices
Preceded by Zhang Zhu	Communist Party Secretary of Guyuan; 2021–2022	Succeeded by Xian Guoyi
Preceded by Bai Shangcheng	Head of the United Front Work Department of the Hui Autonomous Regional Committee of the Chinese Communist Party; 2022–present	Incumbent
