= Ningxia University =

Provincial public university in Yinchuan, Ningxia, China

Coordinates: 38.5364°N 106.1370°E

- 宁夏大学
- Motto: 尚德勤学 求是创新
- Motto in English: Truth and innovation through virtuous and diligent study
- Type: Public
- Established: 1958; 68 years ago
- President: Peng Zhike
- Faculty: 2726
- Students: 28610
- Undergraduates: 19,668
- Postgraduates: 7,664
- Doctoral students: 726
- Location: 489 Helanshan West Road, Yinchuan, Ningxia Hui Autonomous Region, China
- Campus: 508.17 acres (205.65 ha); Urban
- Website: www.nxu.edu.cn

Ningxia University (NXU; 宁夏大学) is a regional public university in Yinchuan, Ningxia, China. It is affiliated with the Ningxia Hui Autonomous Region and co-funded by the regional government and the Ministry of Education. The university is part of Project 211 and the Double First-Class Construction.

== History ==
The school was founded in 1958. In the end of 1997, Ningxia Institute of Technology and Yinchuan Normal College (including Ningxia Education College) were merged into the university. In February 2002, it was merged with Ningxia Agricultural College, and formed the new Ningxia University.

It currently comprises three campuses. It consists of more than 2,600 teachers and staff, over 50% of them are formal instructors. More than half of the instructors hold intermediate to senior titles, 52% of them with masters or doctors degrees. 15 teachers receives special subsidies of the State Council, and 17 were elected into "National Hundreds, Thousands, Tens of Thousands Experts Project". It enrolls more than 15,000 undergraduates and over 1,300 graduates. More than 600 are minority preparatory students.

== Rankings ==
Ningxia University is consistently ranked the best in Ningxia Autonomous Region. Since 2016, it has been consistently ranked among the top 300 nationwide by the Best Chinese Universities Ranking. As of 2025, the Best Chinese Universities Ranking, also known as the "Shanghai Ranking", placed the university 134th in China.

As of 2026, the Academic Ranking of World Universities ranked Ningxia University in the top #901 in the world. Ningxia University was ranked # 943 in the world by the University Rankings by Academic Performance 2026-2027.

== Academic Organization ==
Ningxia University is organized into Residential Colleges (Shuyuan), each of which oversees one or more Academic Divisions (Xuebu), and each division comprises several Schools (Xueyuan) that offer undergraduate programs.
