= Xian Hui =

Chinese politician

- 咸辉
- Xian Hui in 20226

Vice Chairwoman of the Chinese People's Political Consultative Conference
- Incumbent
- Assumed office 10 March 2023
- Chairman: Wang Huning

Chairwoman of Ningxia
- In office 19 September 2016 – 9 May 2022
- Preceded by: Liu Hui
- Succeeded by: Zhang Yupu (acting)

Personal details
- Born: March 1958 (age 68) Dingxi, Gansu
- Party: Chinese Communist Party
- Education: Minzu University of China; Lanzhou University

Xian Hui (Chinese: 咸辉; Xiao'erjing: ﺷِﯿًﺎ ﺧُﻮِ; born March 1958) is a Chinese politician of Hui ethnic heritage, who is currently a vice chairperson of the Chinese People's Political Consultative Conference. She previously served as the Chairwoman (Governor) of the Ningxia Hui Autonomous Region from July 2016 to May 2022. In 2016, along with Bu Xiaolin of Inner Mongolia and Shen Yiqin of Guizhou, Xian Hui was one of only three women to hold a provincial government leadership position in China.

== Career ==
Xian Hui was born in Dingxi prefecture, Gansu in March 1958. During the Down to the Countryside Movement, she became a sent-down youth in Dingxi, performing manual labour. Between 1978 and 1981, she joined one of the first batches of students to be admitted to post-secondary education following the Cultural Revolution and took up studies in Chinese literature at the Minzu University of China. After university, she returned to her home province, and began working in the provincial United Front Work Department, where she would rise steadily through its career ladder and serve until 2005, eventually rising to head the old cadres bureau and the deputy head of the Gansu United Front Department.

In 2003, Xian was appointed deputy head of the Chinese Communist Party's Organization Department of Gansu. In March 2007, Xian was named vice-governor. She was named to the Chinese Communist Party Provincial Standing Committee in April 2012. In May 2015, she became executive vice-governor; she served until July 2016.

On 3 July 2016, Xian was named Chairwoman of Ningxia, a region bordering Gansu. Xian's ascension to the chairwoman's office marked the only known instance in the history of the People's Republic during which one woman succeeded another woman in a leading provincial CCP or government position. She was confirmed as government by the regional People's Congress on 19 September 2016.

Government offices
Preceded by Liu Hui	Chairwoman of Ningxia; 2016–2022	Succeeded by Zhang Yupu
