= Chen Jianguo =

Chinese politician

- Traditional Chinese: 陳建國
- Simplified Chinese: 陈建国
Transcriptions
Standard Mandarin
- Hanyu Pinyin: Chén Jiànguó

Chen Jianguo (Chinese: 陈建国; born July 1945) is a Chinese politician, serving since 2013 as the Chair of the National People's Congress Agriculture and Rural Affairs Committee. He is the former Communist Party Chief of Ningxia Autonomous Region and Chairman of the Ningxia People's Congress. He was born in Rongcheng, Shandong Province. He joined the Chinese People's Liberation Army in July 1962, and the Chinese Communist Party in April 1966. He was an alternate member of the 15th Central Committee of the Chinese Communist Party, and a full member of the 16th and 17th Central Committees.
