= Zhang Yupu =

Chinese politician

- 张雨浦

Chairman of Ningxia
- Incumbent
- Assumed office 9 May 2022
- Party Secretary: Liang Yanshun; Li Yifei
- Preceded by: Xian Hui

Personal details
- Born: August 1962 (age 64) Jinan, Shandong, China
- Party: Chinese Communist Party
- Education: Northeast Agricultural University; Harbin Normal University; Harbin Institute of Technology

Chinese name
- Simplified Chinese: 张雨浦
- Traditional Chinese: 張雨浦
Transcriptions
Standard Mandarin
- Hanyu Pinyin: Zhāng Yùpǔ

Zhang Yupu (Chinese: 张雨浦; born August 1962) is a Chinese politician who is the current chairman (governor) of the Ningxia Hui Autonomous Region, in office since May 2022.

He was a delegate to the 12th National People's Congress and is a delegate to the 13th National People's Congress.

== Early life and education ==
Zhang was born in Jinan, Shandong, in August 1962. After resuming the college entrance examination, in 1980, he entered Northeast Agricultural College (now Northeast Agricultural University), where he majored in agricultural mechanization.

== Career in Heilongjiang ==
Zhang joined the Chinese Communist Party (CCP) in July 1984. After graduation in 1984, he was assigned to the Lanxi County Agricultural Machinery Repair and Manufacturing Factory in Heilongjiang, he served in several posts in the factory, including technician, deputy director of the office, and deputy factory director. He was an engineer and director of the office of Hulan County Automobile Repair Factory between August 1985 and March 1986.

Zhang got involved in politics in March 1986, when he was appointed head of the Office of the United Front Work Department of the CCP Hulan County Committee and deputy director of the Taiwan Work Office. In May 1990, he was transferred to the United Front Work Department of CCP Heilongjiang Provincial Committee and rose to become deputy head in October 2000.

Zhang was made head of the Organization Department of CCP Hegang Committee and secretary of the Enterprise Working Committee in April 2004 and was admitted to member of the Standing Committee of the CCP Hegang Municipal Committee, the city's top authority. Five months later, he was elevated to deputy party secretary of the city, concurrently holding the mayor position since March 2008. In February 2013, he was promoted to party secretary. It would be his first job as "first-in-charge" of a city. He also served as chairman of its People's Congress from June 2013 to March 2015. He was appointed party secretary of Mudanjiang in March 2015, concurrently serving as chairman of its People's Congress. He was appointed secretary-general of CCP Heilongjiang Provincial Committee, director of the General Office, secretary of the Working Committee of Organs Directly under the Provincial Government in September 2016 and three months later was admitted to member of the Standing Committee of the CCP Heilongjiang Provincial Committee, the province's top authority.

== Career in Ningxia ==
In August 2021, he was promoted to party secretary of Yinchuan was admitted to member of the Standing Committee of the CCP Ningxia Regional Committee, the region's top authority. In May 2022, he was named acting chairman and later chairman of Ningxia Hui Autonomous Region, succeeding Xian Hui.

Party political offices
Preceded by Du Jiming	Communist Party Secretary of Hegang; 2013–2015	Succeeded by Wu Fengcheng
Preceded by Zhang Jingchuan	Communist Party Secretary of Mudanjiang; 2015–2016	Succeeded by Liu Xin
Preceded by Li Haitao	Secretary-General of CCP Heilongjiang Provincial Committee; 2016–2021	Succeeded by Xu Jianguo
Preceded by Zhang Zhu	Communist Party Secretary of Yinchuan; 2021–present	Incumbent
Government offices
Preceded by Zhu Qingwen	Mayor of Hegang; 2008–2013	Succeeded by Liang Chengjun
Preceded by Xian Hui	Chairman of Ningxia; 2022–present	Incumbent
Assembly seats
Preceded by Zhang Jingchuan	Chairman of Mudanjiang Municipal People's Congress; 2015–2016	Succeeded by Liu Xin
Preceded by Du Jiming	Chairman of Hegang Municipal People's Congress; 2013–2015	Succeeded by Wu Fengcheng
