= Ningxia =

Autonomous region of China

Ningxia Ningsia
- Autonomous region
- Ningxia Hui Autonomous Region

Chinese transcription(s)
  - Chinese characters: 宁夏回族自治区
  - Xiao'erjing: نِئٍ‌ثِيَا خُوِزُو زِجِ‌کِیُوِ
  - Pinyin: Níngxià Huízú Zìzhìqū
  - Abbreviation: NX / 宁 (Níng)
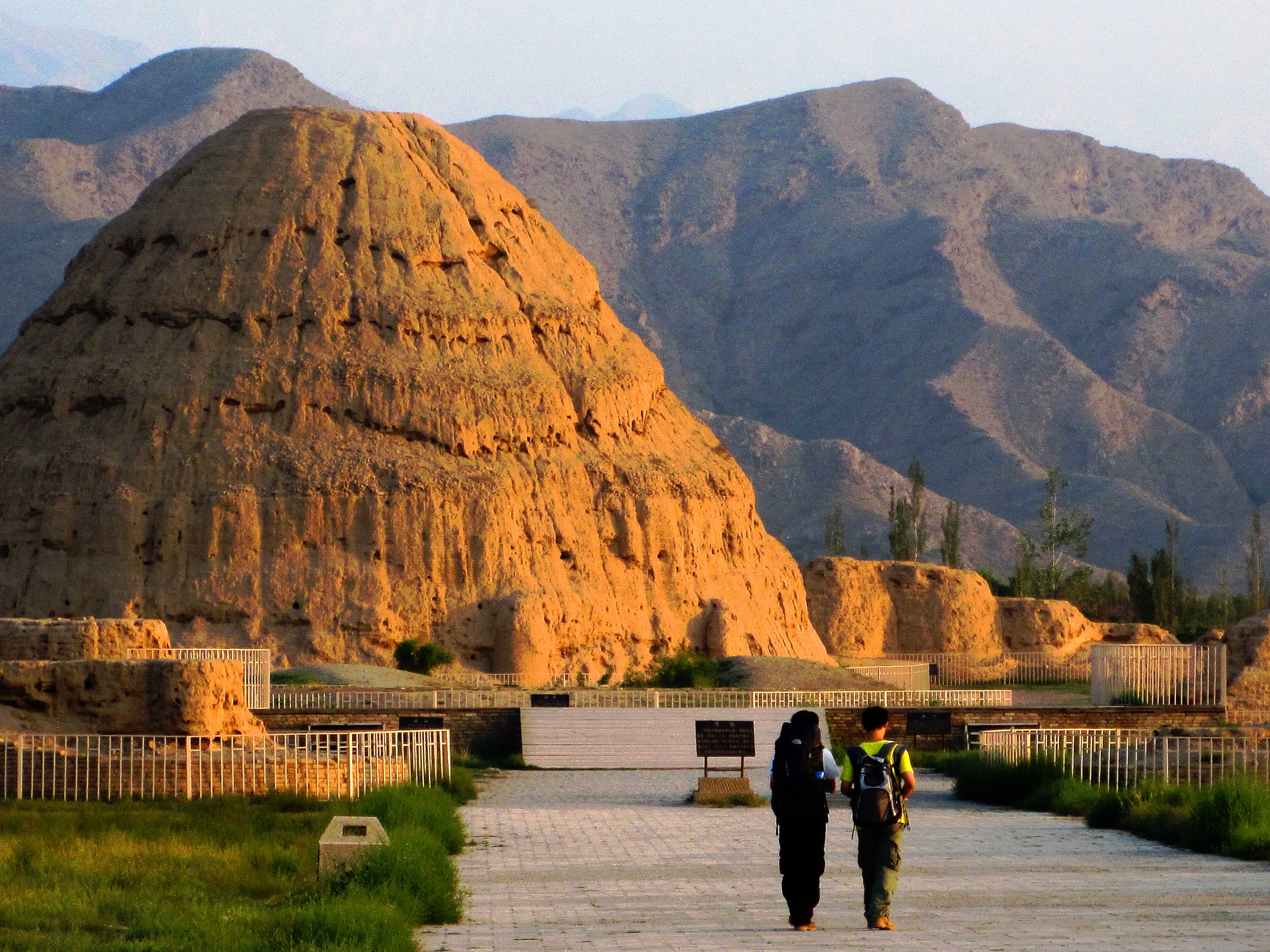
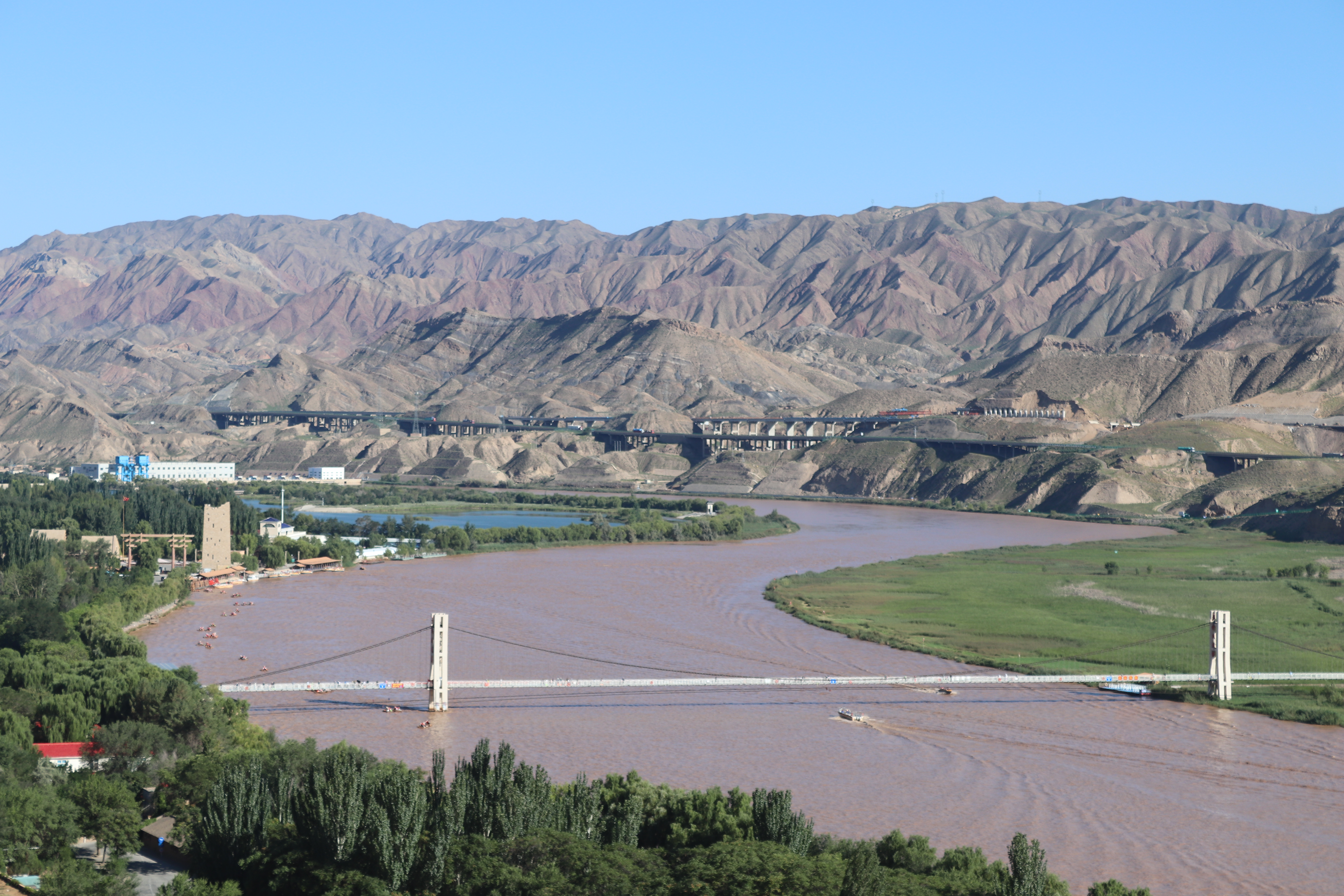
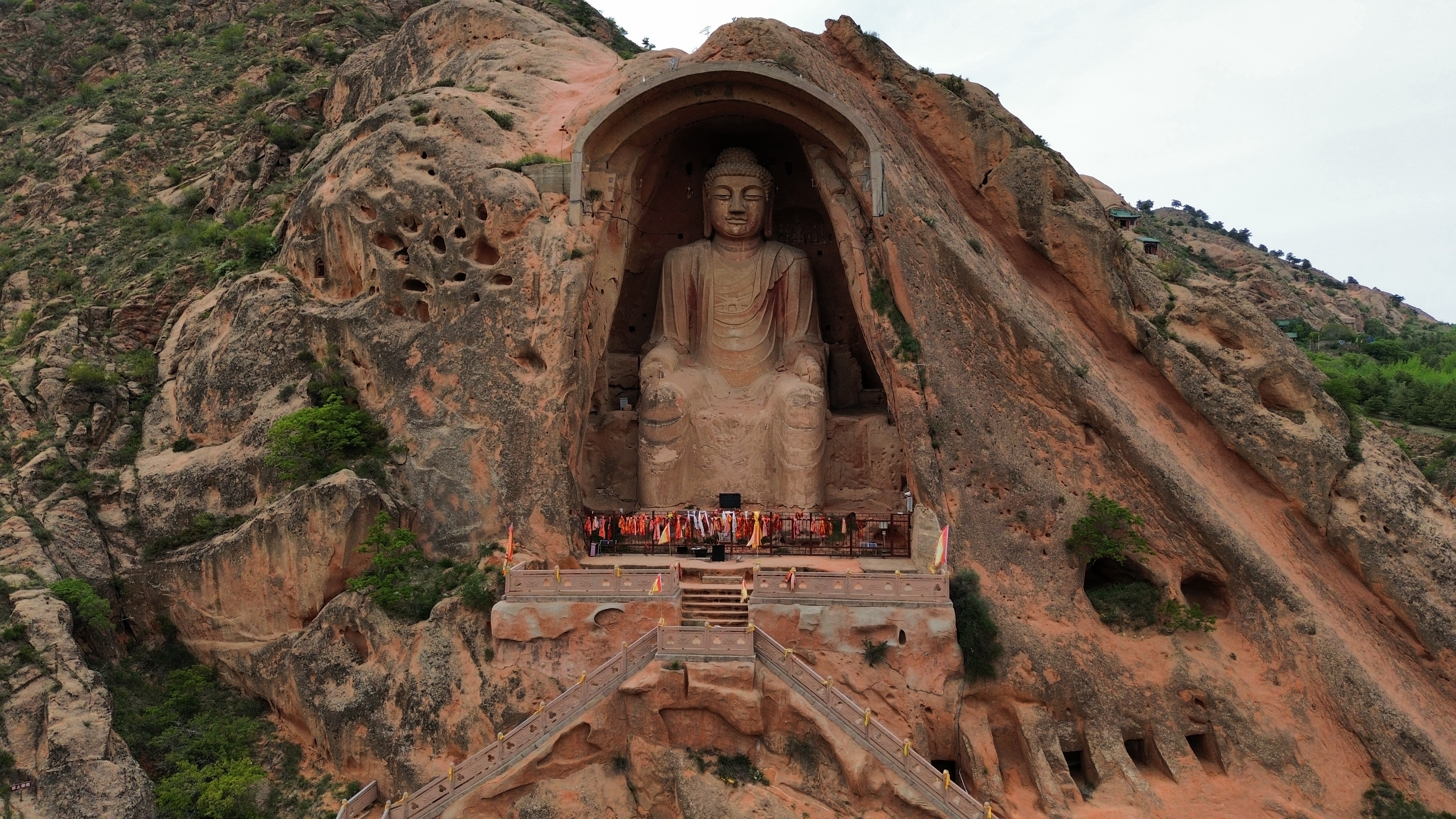
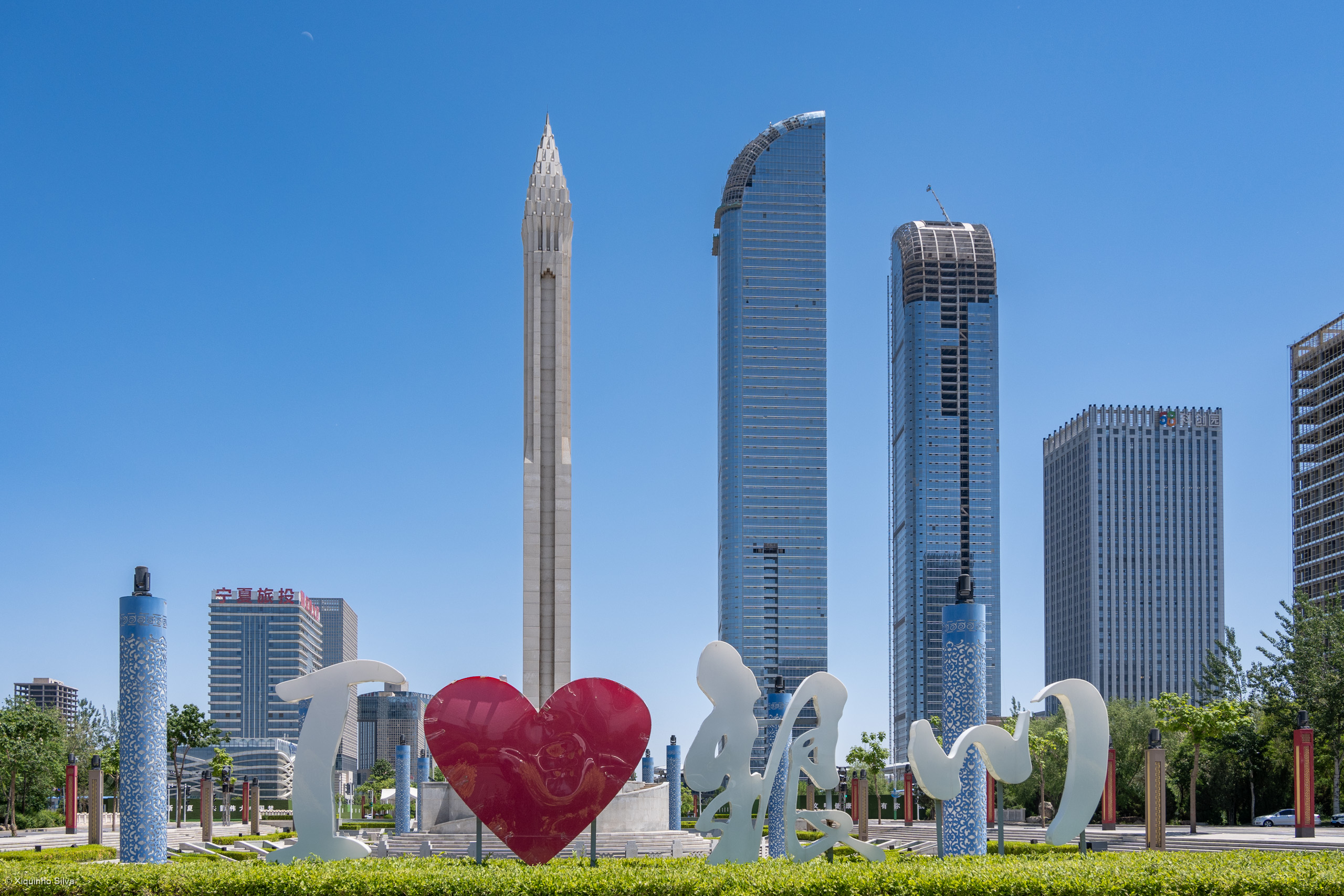
- Western Xia mausoleums Yellow River near Shapotou Xumishan Grottoes Skyline of Jinfeng District

- Location of Ningxia within China
- Country: China
- Capital (and largest city): Yinchuan
- Divisions: 5 prefectures, 21 counties, 219 townships

Government
  - Type: Autonomous region
  - Body: Ningxia Hui Autonomous Regional People's Congress
  - Party Secretary: Li Yifei
  - Congress Chairman: vacant
  - Government Chairman: Zhang Yupu
  - CPPCC Chairman: Chen Yong
  - National People's Congress Representation: 23 deputies

Area
  - Total: 66,399.73 km^{2} (25,637.08 sq mi)
  - Rank: 27th
- Highest elevation (Helan Mountains): 3,556 m (11,667 ft)

Population (2020)
  - Total: 7,202,654
  - Rank: 30th
  - Density: 108.4741/km^{2} (280.9467/sq mi)
  - Rank: 25th

Demographics
  - Ethnic composition: Han – 62%; Hui – 38%
  - Languages and dialects: Lanyin Mandarin; Central Plains Mandarin

GDP (2025)
  - Total: CN¥569.6 billion (29th; US$79.8 billion)
  - Per capita: CN¥77,981 (20th; US$10,917)
- ISO 3166 code: CN-NX
- HDI (2023): 0.773 (21st) – high
- Website: www.nx.gov.cn

Ningxia
- "Ningxia" in simplified (top) and traditional (bottom) Chinese characters
- Simplified Chinese: 宁夏
- Traditional Chinese: 寧夏
- Xiao'erjing: نِئٍ‌ثِيَا
- Hanyu Pinyin: Níngxià
- Postal: Ningsia
- Literal meaning: "Pacified Xia"
Transcriptions
Standard Mandarin
- Hanyu Pinyin: Níngxià
- Bopomofo: ㄋㄧㄥˊ ㄒㄧㄚˋ
- Wade–Giles: Ning^{2}-hsia^{4}
- Yale Romanization: Níngsyà
- IPA: [nǐŋ.ɕjâ]
other Mandarin
- Xiao'erjing: نِئٍ‌ثِيَا
- Dungan: Нинщя
Wu
- Suzhounese: Gnin^{2}-gho^{6}
Hakka
- Romanization: Nèn-ha
Yue: Cantonese
- Yale Romanization: Nìhnghah
- Jyutping: Ning4haa6
- IPA: [nɪŋ˩.ha˨]
Southern Min
- Hokkien POJ: Lêng-hā
- Teochew Peng'im: Lêng-hiā
Eastern Min
- Fuzhou BUC: Nìng-hâ

Official name
- Simplified Chinese: 宁夏回族自治区
- Traditional Chinese: 寧夏回族自治區
- Xiao'erjing: نِئٍ‌ثِيَا خُوِزُو زِجِ‌ٿِيُوِ
- Hanyu Pinyin: Níngxià Huízú Zìzhìqū
- Postal: Ningsia Hui Autonomous Region
Transcriptions
Standard Mandarin
- Hanyu Pinyin: Níngxià Huízú Zìzhìqū
- Bopomofo: ㄋㄧㄥˊ ㄒㄧㄚˋ ㄏㄨㄟˊ ㄗㄨˊ ㄗˋ ㄓˋ ㄑㄩ
- Gwoyeu Romatzyh: Ningshiah Hweitzwu Tzyhjyhchiu
- Wade–Giles: Ning^{2}-hsia^{4} Hui^{2}-tsu^{2} Tzŭ^{4}-chih^{4}-chʻü^{1}
- Yale Romanization: Níngsyà Hwéidzú Dz̀jr̀chyū
- IPA: [nǐŋ.ɕjâ xwěɪ.tsǔ tsɹ̩̂.ʈʂɻ̩̂.tɕʰý]
other Mandarin
- Xiao'erjing: نِئٍ‌ثِيَا خُوِزُو زِجِ‌ٿِيُوِ
- Dungan: Нинщя Хуэйзў Зыҗычў
Wu
- Romanization: Nyin^{平}ya^{去} we^{平}zoh^{入} zy^{去}zy^{去}chiu^{平}
Hakka
- Romanization: Nèn-ha Fui-tshu̍k Tshṳ-tshṳ-khî
Yue: Cantonese
- Yale Romanization: Nìhnghah Wùihjuhk Jihjihkēui
- Jyutping: Ning4haa6 Wui4zuk6 Zi6zi6keoi1
- IPA: [nɪŋ˩.ha˨ wuj˩.tsʊk̚˨ tsi˨.tsi˨.kʰɵɥ˥]
Southern Min
- Hokkien POJ: Lêng-hā Hôe-cho̍k Chū-tī-khu
- Teochew Peng'im: Lêng-hiā Huê-tsôk Tsĕu-tī-khu
Eastern Min
- Fuzhou BUC: Nìng-hâ Huòi-cŭk Cê̤ṳ-dê-kṳ̆

Ningxia, (Note: /nɪŋˈʃɑː/,/ˈnɪŋˈʃjɑː/; 宁夏, Mandarin: [nǐŋ.ɕjâ]; alternately romanized as Ninghsia) officially the Ningxia Hui Autonomous Region (NHAR), is an autonomous region in Northwestern China. Formerly a province, Ningxia was incorporated into Gansu in 1954 but was later separated from Gansu in 1958 and reconstituted as an autonomous region for the Hui people, one of the 56 officially recognised ethnicities in China. Twenty percent of China's Hui population lives in Ningxia.

Ningxia is bounded by Shaanxi to the east, Gansu to the south and west and Inner Mongolia Autonomous Region to the north and has an area of around 66,400 square kilometres (25,600 sq mi). This sparsely settled, mostly desert region lies partially on the Loess Plateau and in the vast plain of the Yellow River and features the Great Wall of China along its northeastern boundary. Over about 2000 years, an extensive system of canals (with a total length of approximately 1397 kilometers) has been built since the Qin dynasty. Extensive land reclamation and irrigation projects have made increased cultivation possible. The arid region of Xihaigu, which covers large parts of the province, suffers from severe water shortage, which the canals were intended to alleviate.

Ningxia was the core area of the Western Xia in the 11th–13th centuries, established by the Tangut people; its name, "Peaceful Xia", derived from the Mongol conquest of the state. The Tanguts made significant achievements in literature, art, music, and architecture, and in particular, invented Tangut script. Long one of the country's poorest areas, a small winemaking industry has become economically important since the 1980s. Before the arrival of viticulture, Ningxia's 6.8 million people, 36 per cent of whom are Muslims from the Hui ethnic group, relied largely on animal grazing, subsistence agriculture and the cultivation of wolfberries used in traditional Chinese medicine. Since then, winemaking has become the premier specialty of Ningxia, and the province devotes almost 40,000 hectares to vineyards and producing 120 million bottles of wine in 2017 – a quarter of the entire nation's production.

== History ==
The earliest human activity in Ningxia can be traced back to 30,000 years ago, with remains of the Shuidonggou culture found in Lingwu.

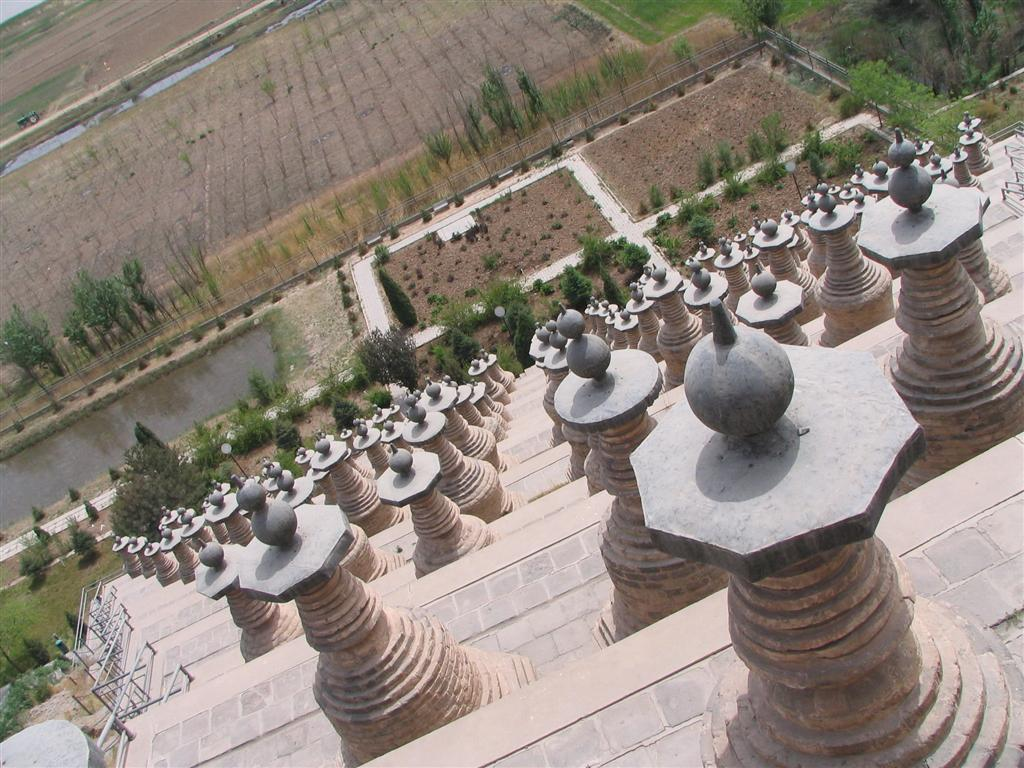
The 108 stupas near Qingtongxia.

As a frontier zone between nomadic pastoralists and sedentary farmers, Ningxia was a frequent seat of war and incursions by non-Chinese tribes. Ningxia and its surrounding areas were incorporated into the Qin as the Beidi Commandery as early as the 3rd century BC. To pacify the region, the imperial government established military colonies to reclaim land. In addition, horse pasturages were founded under the Imperial Stud to safeguard the supply of army horses, as early as the Western Han dynasty (206 BC – AD 9). Throughout the Han dynasty and the Tang dynasty there were several large cities established in the region. The Liang Province rebellion at the end of the Han dynasty affected Ningxia.

By the 11th century the Tangut people had established the Western Xia dynasty on the outskirts of the then-Song dynasty. Jews also lived in Ningxia, as evidenced by the fact that in 1489, after a major flood destroyed Torah scrolls in Kaifeng, a replacement set was sent to the Kaifeng Jews by the Ningbo and Ningxia Jewish communities.

It then came under Mongol domination after Genghis Khan conquered Yinchuan in the early 13th century. Muslims from Central Asia also began moving into Ningxia from the west. By the late 17th century, Ningxia had become a weaving centre, producing many early Chinese carpets. The Muslim Dungan Revolt of the 19th century affected Ningxia.

In 1914, Ningxia was merged with the province of Gansu. In 1928, it became a separate province. Between 1914 and 1928, the Ma clique ruled the provinces of Qinghai, Ningxia and Gansu; General Ma Hongkui was the military governor of Ningxia and had absolute authority in the province. The Muslim conflict in Gansu, which lasted from 1927 to 1930, spilt over into Ningxia. In 1934, warlord and National Revolutionary Army general Sun Dianying attempted to conquer the province, but was defeated by an alliance led by the Ma clique.

From 1950 to 1958, a Kuomintang Islamic insurgency resulted in fighting throughout Northwest China, including Ningxia. In 1954, the Chinese government merged Ningxia with Gansu, but in 1958 Ningxia formally became an autonomous region of China. In 1969, Ningxia received a part of the Inner Mongolian Autonomous Region, but this area was returned in 1979.

A number of Chinese artifacts dating from the Tang dynasty and Song dynasty, some of which had been owned by Emperor Zhenzong, were excavated and then came into the hands of Ma Hongkui, who refused to publicize the findings. Among the artifacts were a white marble tablet from the Tang dynasty, gold nails, and bands made out of metal. It was not until after Ma Hongkui died that his wife went to Taiwan in 1971 from America to bring the artifacts to Chiang Kai-shek, who turned them over to the Taipei National Palace Museum.

== Geography ==
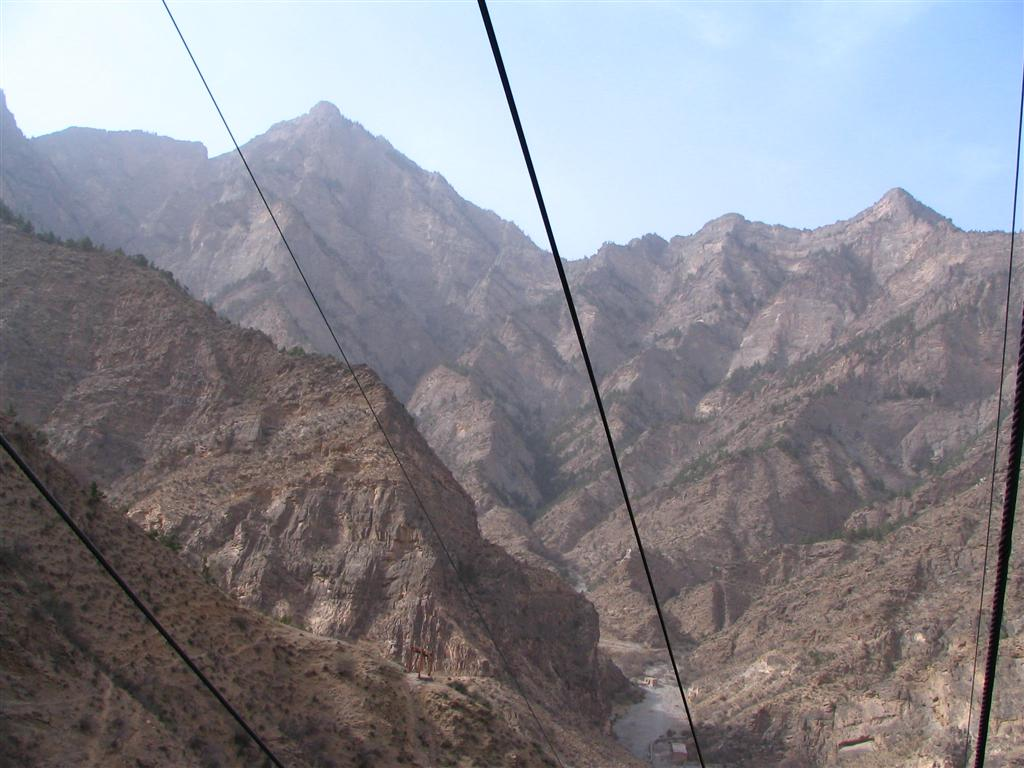
From a cable car running to the top of Helan Mountains.

Present-day Ningxia is one of the nation's smallest provincial-level units and borders the provinces of Shaanxi and Gansu and the Inner Mongolia Autonomous Region. At 3556 meters above sea level, Aobaogeda (敖包疙瘩) in the Helan Mountains is the highest point in Ningxia.

Ningxia is a relatively dry, desert-like region and features a diverse geography of forested mountains and hills, table lands, deserts, flood plains and basins cut through by the Yellow River. The Ningxia ecosystem is one of the least studied regions in the world. Significant irrigation supports the growing of wolfberries, a commonly consumed fruit throughout the region. Ningxia's deserts include the Tengger Desert in Shapotou.

The northern section, through which the Yellow River flows, supports the best agricultural land. A railroad, linking Lanzhou with Baotou, crosses the region. A highway has been built across the Yellow River at Yinchuan.

On 16 December 1920, the Haiyuan earthquake, 8.6 magnitude, at 36.6°N 105.32°E, initiated a series of landslides that killed an estimated 200,000 people. Over 600 large loess landslides created more than 40 new lakes.

=== Grasslands ===
It was reported that approximately 34 percent (33.85 million mu; 22,600 km^{2}) of the region's total surface consisted of grassland. This figure is down from approximately 40 percent in the 1990s. The grasslands are spread over the dry desert-steppe area in the northeast (which forms a part of the Inner Mongolian steppe region), and the hilly pastures located on the semi-arid Loess Plateau in the south. It is ascertained that the grasslands of Ningxia have been degraded to various degrees. Scientists debate the extent to which this degradation occurs over space and time. Historical research has also found limited evidence of expanding grassland degradation and desertification in Ningxia. A major component of land management in Ningxia is a ban on open grazing, which has been in place since 2003. The ecological and socio-economic effects of this Grazing Ban in relation to the grasslands and pastoralists' livelihood are contested. The ban stipulates that animal husbandry be limited to enclosed pens and no open grazing be permitted in certain time periods set by the Autonomous Region's People's Government.

=== Climate ===
Taole

Climate chart (precipitation, max. and min. temperature)
J	F	M	A	M	J	J	A	S	O	N	D
1 2 −14	5 9 −12	4 19 −4	19 27 1	18 36 10	40 39 14	70 40 19	48 38 17	58 30 11	18 24 4	4 12 −6	1 2 −12
- █ Average max. and min. temperatures in °C
- █ Precipitation totals in mm
Imperial conversion
J	F	M	A	M	J	J	A	S	O	N	D
0 36 7	0.2 48 10	0.2 66 25	0.7 81 34	0.7 97 50	1.6 102 57	2.8 104 66	1.9 100 63	2.3 86 52	0.7 75 39	0.2 54 21	0 36 10
- █ Average max. and min. temperatures in °F
- █ Precipitation totals in inches

The region is 1,200 kilometres (750 mi) from the sea and has an arid continental climate on the north to humid continental climate to the south, with average summer temperatures rising to 17 to 24 °C (63 to 75 °F) in July and average winter temperatures dropping to between −7 and −15 °C (19 and 5 °F) in January. Seasonal extreme temperatures can reach 39 °C (102 °F) in summer and −30 °C (−22 °F) in winter. The diurnal temperature variation can reach above 17 °C (31 °F), especially in spring. Annual rainfall averages from 190 to 700 millimetres (7.5 to 27.6 in), with more rain falling in the south of the region.

=== Mineral resources ===
Ningxia is rich in mineral resources with proven deposits of 34 kinds of minerals, much of which located in grassland areas. In 2011 it was estimated that the potential value per capita of these resources accounted for 163.5 percent of the nation's average. Ningxia boasts verified coal reserves of over 30 billion tons, with an estimated reserve of more than 202 billion tons, ranking sixth nationwide. Coal deposits are spread over one-third of the total surface of Ningxia, and mined in four major fields in the Helan and Xiangshan mountains, Ningdong and Yuanzhou (or Guyuan). The region's reserves of oil and natural gas can be found in Yanchi and Lingwu County, and are ideal for large-scale development of oil, natural gas and chemical industries. Ningxia leads China in gypsum deposits, with a proven reserve of more than 4.5 billion tons, of which the rarely found, top-grade gypsum accounts for half of the total deposits. The Hejiakouzi deposit in Tongxin County features a reserve of 20 million tons of gypsum with a total thickness of 100 meters. There is a considerable deposit of quartz sandstone, of which 17 million tons have been ascertained. In addition, there are phosphorus, flint, copper, iron, barite, other minerals and Helan stone – a special clay stone.

== Politics ==
Like all governing institutions in mainland China, Ningxia has a parallel party-government system, in which the CCP Ningxia Regional Committee secretary outranks the government chairman. The CCP Ningxia Regional Committee acts as the top policy-formulation body, and has control over the Ningxia Hui Autonomous Region People's Government.

== Administrative divisions ==
Ningxia is divided into five prefecture-level divisions: all prefecture-level cities:

Administrative divisions of Ningxia
Division code	Division	Area in km^{2}	Population 2020	Seat	Divisions		
Division code	Division	Area in km^{2}	Population 2020	Seat	Districts	Counties	CL cities
640000	Ningxia Hui Autonomous Region	66,400.00	7,202,654	Yinchuan city	9	11	2
640100	Yinchuan city	8,874.61	2,859,074	Jinfeng District	3	2	1
640200	Shizuishan city	5,208.13	751,389	Dawukou District	2	1	
640300	Wuzhong city	21,420.14	1,382,713	Litong District	2	2	1
640400	Guyuan city	13,449.03	1,142,142	Yuanzhou District	1	4	
640500	Zhongwei city	17,448.09	1,067,336	Shapotou District	1	2	

Administrative divisions in Chinese and varieties of romanizations
English	Chinese	Pinyin	Xiao'erjing
Ningxia Hui Autonomous Region	宁夏回族自治区	Níngxià Huízú Zìzhìqū	نِئٍ‌ثِيَا خُوِزُو زِجِ‌ٿِيُوِ
Yinchuan city	银川市	Yínchuān Shì	ءٍچُوًا شِ
Shizuishan city	石嘴山市	Shízuǐshān Shì	شِ‌ظُوِشًا شِ
Wuzhong city	吴忠市	Wúzhōng Shì	وُجْو شِ
Guyuan city	固原市	Gùyuán Shì	قُ‌يُوًا شِ
Zhongwei city	中卫市	Zhōngwèi Shì	جْووِ شِ

The five prefecture-level cities of Ningxia are subdivided into 22 county-level divisions (9 districts, 2 county-level cities, and 11 counties).

Population by urban areas of prefecture & county cities
#	Cities	2020 Urban area	2010 Urban area	2020 City proper
1	Yinchuan	1,230,650	1,159,457	2,859,074
2	Shizuishan	422,043	403,901	751,389
3	Wuzhong	400,677	232,134	1,382,713
4	Guyuan	267,810	130,155	1,142,142
5	Zhongwei	249,307	160,279	1,067,336
6	Lingwu	200,920	125,976	see Yinchuan
7	Qingtongxia	142,349	99,367	see Wuzhong

== Economy ==
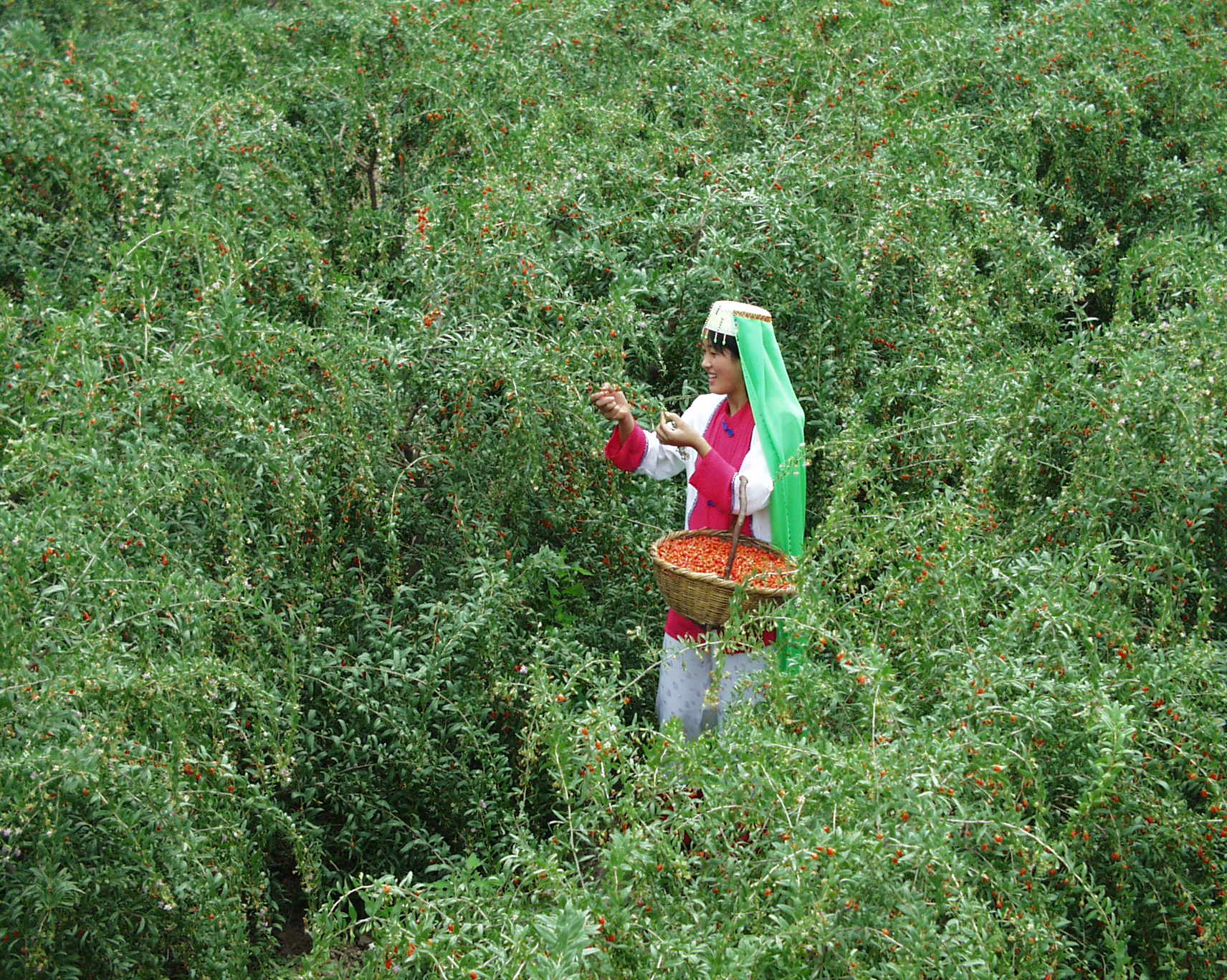
Wolfberry harvest celebration

Rural Ningxia was for long an officially designated poverty area, and remains on the lower rungs of the developmental ladder. Its nominal GDP in 2023 was 569.65 billion yuan (US$79.75 billion) and its per capita GDP 77,981 yuan (US$10,917). It comprises 0.41% of the national economy.

=== Agriculture ===
Similar to other areas, Ningxia has seen a gradual decline of its peasant population due to rural–urban migration. Despite this, the great majority (62.8 percent) was still agricultural at the time of the survey. Animal husbandry is important for the regional economy. In the main pastoral county, Yanchi, it is even the leading industry when specified for the primary sector. The dominant grazing animals are sheep and goat. In the (semi-)pastoral regions, herders engage in a mixed sedentary farming operation of dryland agriculture and extensive animal husbandry, while full nomadic pastoralism is no longer practiced. Since a cattle breeding plan was implemented in 2002, the province has become one of China's main dairy production areas.

Ningxia is the principal region of China where wolfberries are grown. Other specialties of Ningxia are licorice, products made from Helan stone, fiddlehead and products made from sheepskin.

Ningxia wines are a promising area of development. The Chinese authorities have given approval to the development of the eastern base of the Helan Mountains as an area suitable for wine production. Several large Chinese wine companies including Changyu and Dynasty Wine have begun development in the western region of the province. Together they now own 20,000 acres of land for wine plantations and Dynasty has ploughed 100 million yuan into Ningxia. In addition, the major oil company China Petroleum and Chemical Corporation has founded a grape plantation near the Helan Mountains. The household appliance company Midea has also begun participating in Ningxia's wine industry. Vineyards have been set up in the region.

=== Industries and economic zones ===
Ningxia was a major recipient of China's investment in industrial capacity during the Third Front campaign.

Yinchuan Economic and Technological Development Zone was established in 1992. Spanning 32 km^{2} (12 sq mi), it has an annual economic output Rmb23.7 billion (25.1% up) (US$3.5 billion). Major investors are mainly local enterprises such as Kocel Steel Foundry, FAG Railway Bearing (Ningxia), Ningxia Little Giant Machine Tools, etc. Major industries include machinery and equipment manufacturing, new materials, fine chemicals and the animation industry.

Desheng Industrial Park (in Helan County) is a base for about 400 enterprises. The industrial park has industrial chains from Muslim food and commodities to trade and logistics, new materials and bio-pharmaceuticals that has 80 billion yuan in fixed assets. Desheng is looking to be the most promising industrial park in the city. It achieved a total output value of 4.85 billion in 2008, up 40 percent year-on-year. The local government plans to cut taxes and other fees to reduce the burden on local enterprises. The industrial output value reached 2.68 billion yuan in 2008, an increase of 48 percent from a year earlier.

== Transport ==
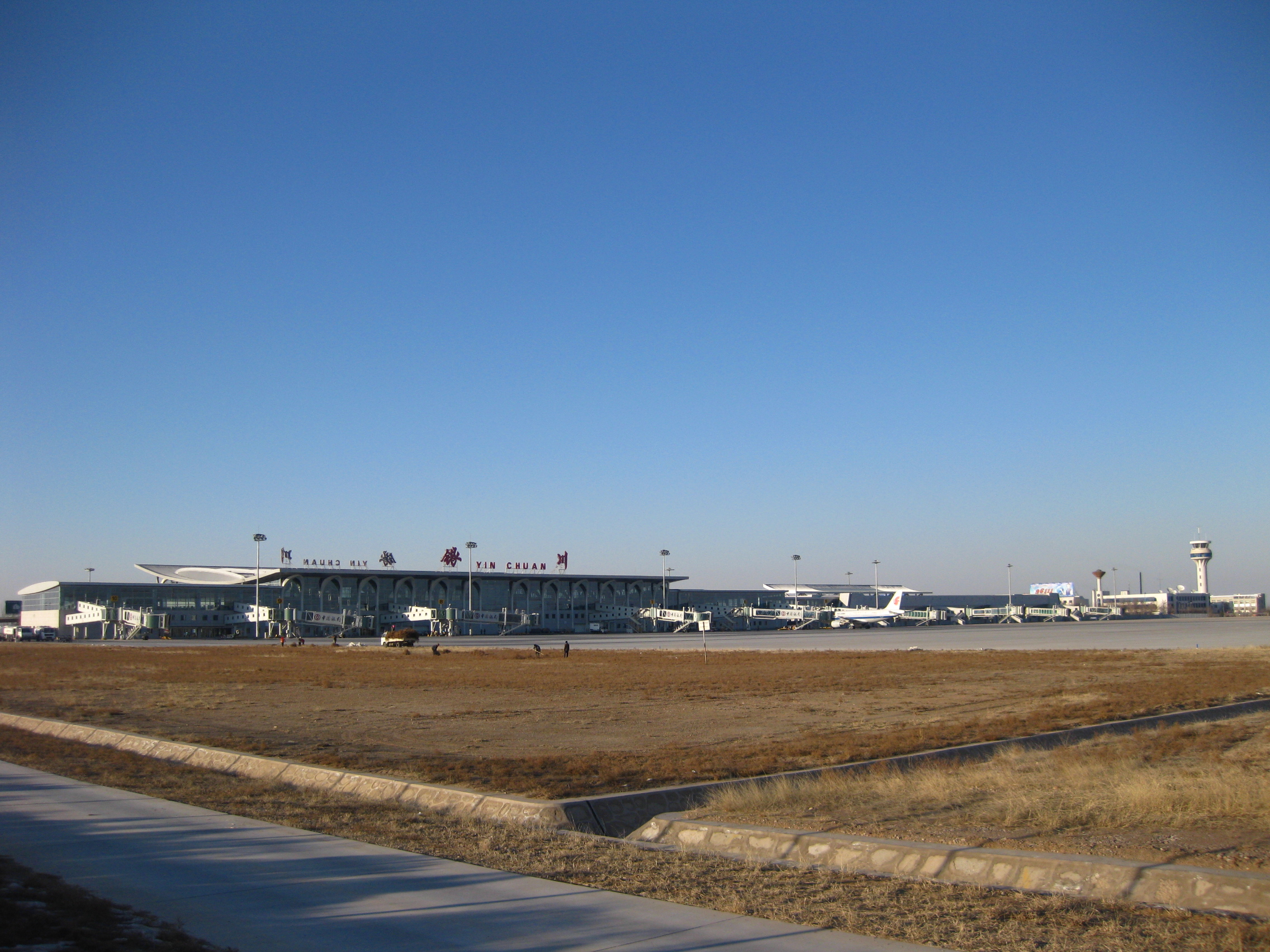
Yinchuan Hedong Airport

=== Airports ===
- Yinchuan Hedong International Airport
- Zhongwei Shapotou Airport
- Guyuan Liupanshan Airport
- Wuhai Airport (serves the northern area)

=== Highways ===
- China National Highway 109
- China National Highway 110
- China National Highway 211
- China National Highway 307
- China National Highway 309
- China National Highway 312

=== Bridge ===
- Taole Yellow River Expressway Bridge (陶乐黄河大桥)

=== Rail ===
- Baotou–Lanzhou railway
- Baoji–Zhongwei railway (宝中铁路)

== Demographics ==
Historical population
Year	Pop.	±%
1912	303,000	—
1928	1,450,000	+378.5%
1936–37	978,000	−32.6%
1947	759,000	−22.4%
1982	3,895,578	+413.3%
1990	4,655,451	+19.5%
2000	5,486,393	+17.8%
2010	6,301,350	+14.9%
2020	7,202,654	+14.3%
Ningxia Province/AR was part of Gansu 1914–1929 and 1954–1958; In 1947 parts of Ningxia Province/AR were incorporated into Inner Mongolia AR.

=== Religion ===
Religion in Ningxia (around 2010)
1. Others (Chinese religions, Buddhism, or not religious) (64.8%)
2. Islam (34.0%)
3. Christianity (1.17%)

Islam is the largest religion in Ningxia, adhered to by 34% of the population according to a 2010 survey. Many of the Han Chinese practise Chinese folk religions, Taoism, Confucianism and Chinese Buddhism. Christianity was the religion of 1.17% of the province's population according to the Chinese General Social Survey of 2004.

In 2008, there were 3,760 mosques in Ningxia, which is about one per 1730 residents.

== Hospitals ==
- People's Hospital of Ningxia
- Hospital of Traditional Chinese Medicine of Ningxia
- Ningxia Medical College Affiliated Hospital
- Yinchuan Hospital of Traditional Chinese Medicine
- Yinchuan People's Hospital
- Yinchuan Stomatological Hospital
- Yinchuan Women and Children's Healthcare Center
- Women and Children's Healthcare Center of Ningixa
- Yinchuan No.1 People's Hospital
- Yinchuan No.2 People's Hospital
- Yinchuan No.3 People's Hospital
- Shizuishan No.2 People's Hospital
- Guyuan Hospital of Ningxia

== Tourism ==
One of Ningxia's main tourist spots is the internationally renowned Xixia Tombs site located 30 km (19 mi) west of Yinchuan. The remnants of nine Western Xia emperors' tombs and two hundred other tombs lie within a 50 km^{2} (19 sq mi) area. Other famous sites in Ningxia include the Helan Mountains, the mysterious 108 stupas, the twin pagodas of Baisikou and the desert research outpost at Shapotou. A less visited tourist spot in Ningxia is the Mount Sumeru Grottoes (须弥山), which is among the ten most famous grottoes in China.

== Museums ==
- Ningxia Museum, opened in 1988
- Ningxia Transportation Museum, opened in August 2008
- Museum of Contemporary Art Yinchuan (MOCA Yinchuan), opened on 8 August 2015.

== Notable people ==
- Emma Gao, winemaker
- Zhang Jin, physical chemist and nanotechnologist

== Gallery ==
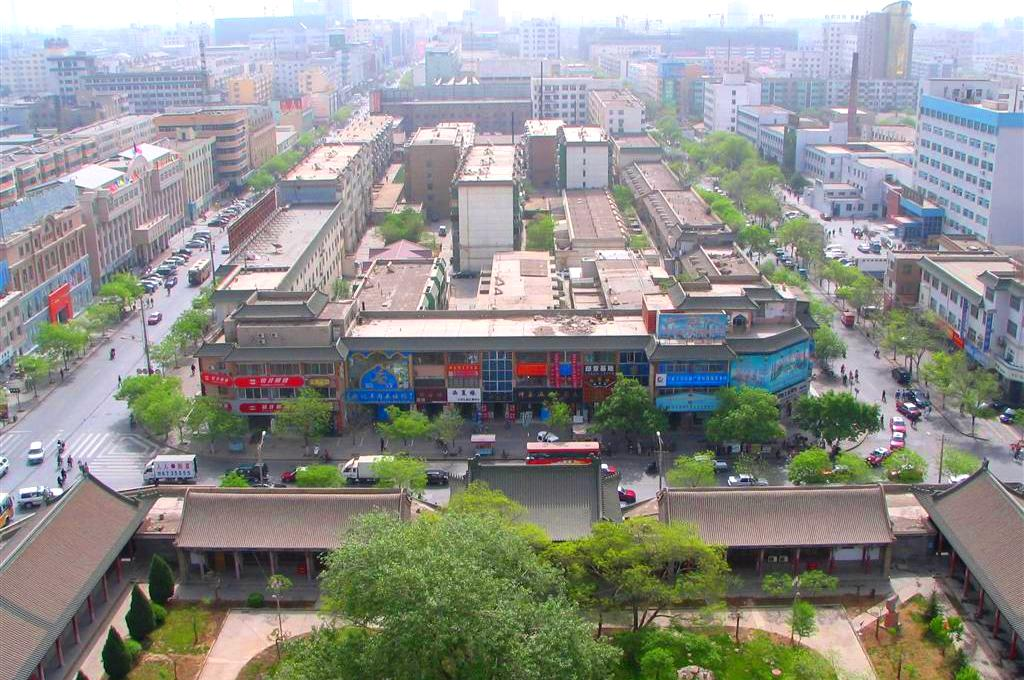
View of Yinchuan looking east from top of Chengtian Temple Pagoda.

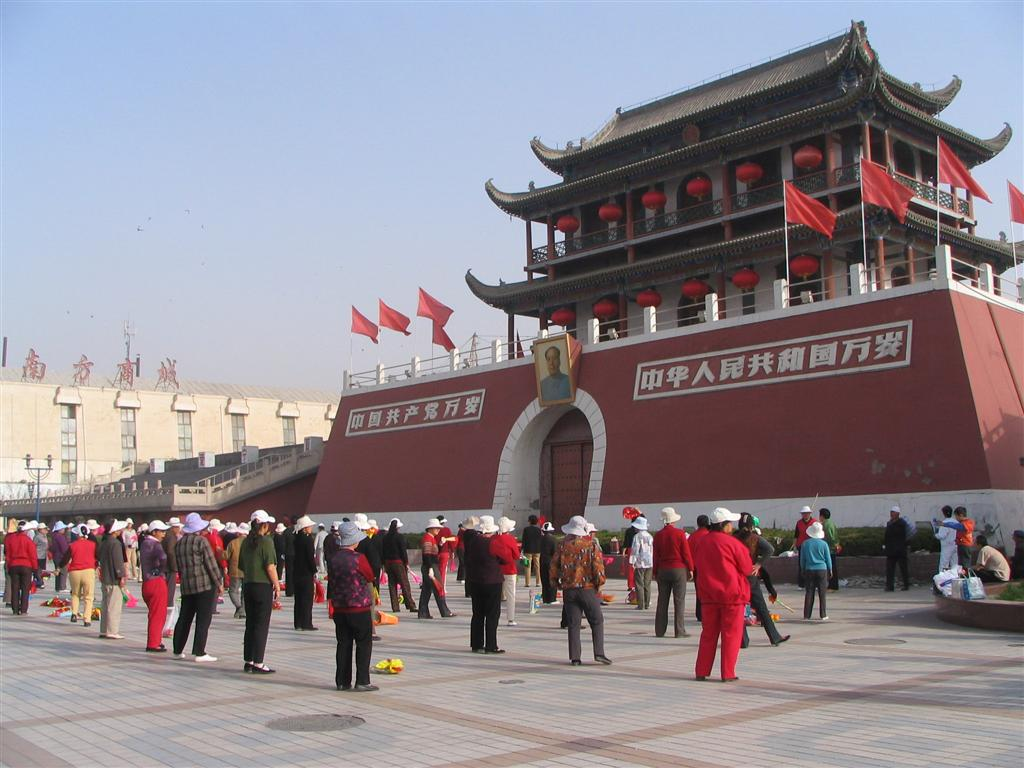
People's Square in Yinchuan.

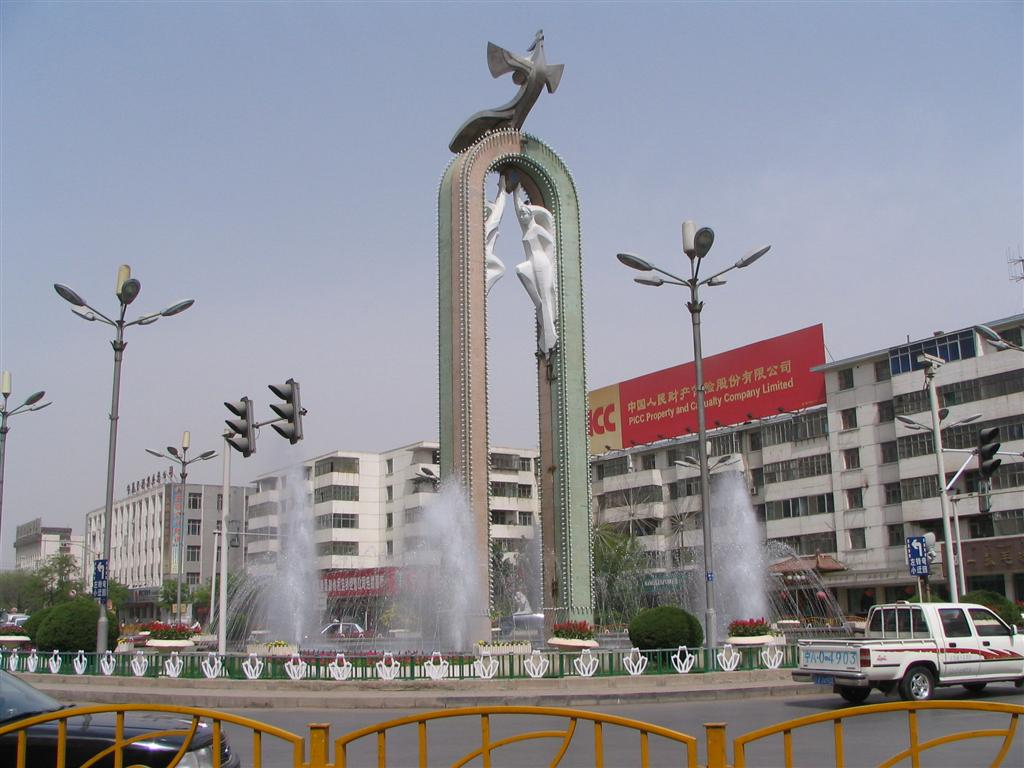
Phoenix Tablet fountain in Yinchuan.

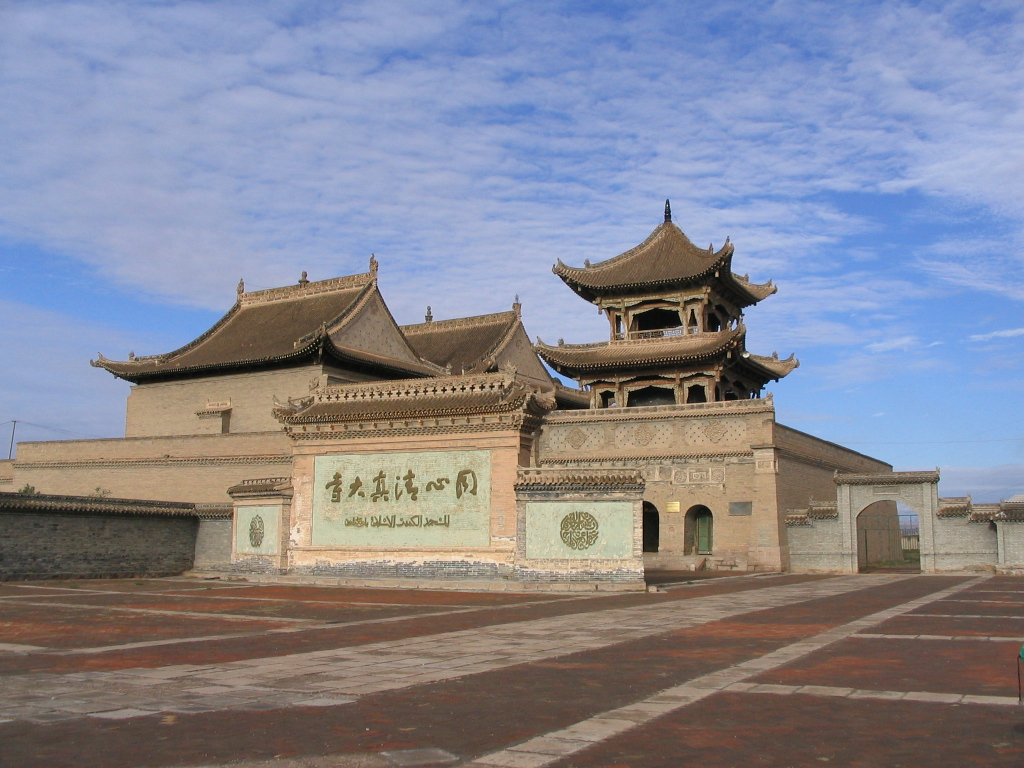
Tongxin Great Mosque, one of the oldest mosques in Ningxia and a famous cultural relic among the locals.

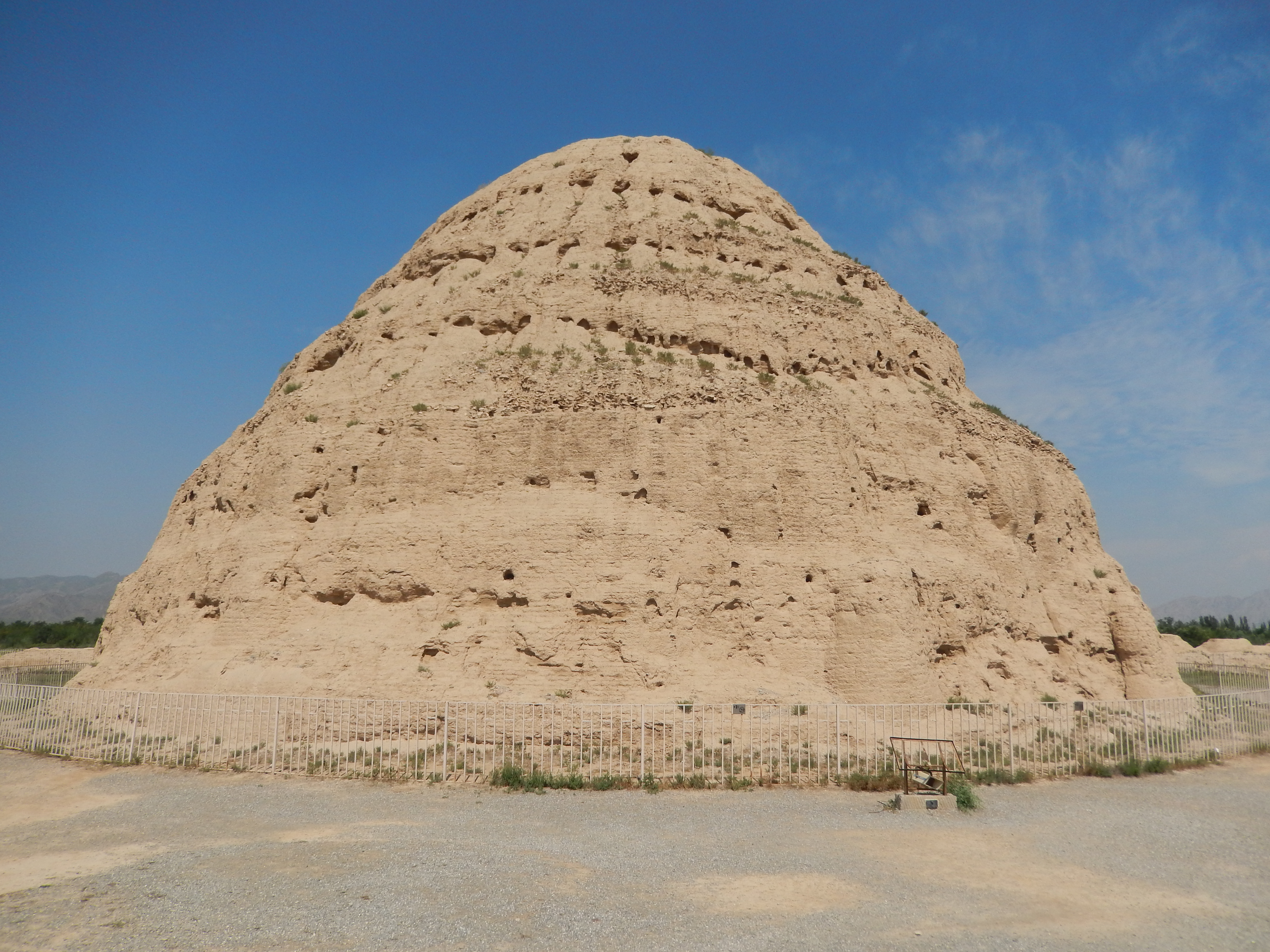
A tomb of the Western Xia

== See also ==
- Major national historical and cultural sites in Ningxia
