= Politics of Shanxi =

The politics of Shanxi Province in the People's Republic of China is structured in a dual party-government system like all other governing institutions in mainland China.

The Governor of Shanxi (山西省长) is the highest-ranking official in the People's Government of Shanxi. However, in the province's dual party-government governing system, the Governor has less power than the Shanxi Chinese Communist Party (CCP) Provincial Committee Secretary (山西省委书记), colloquially termed the "Shanxi CCP Party Chief".

During the anti-corruption campaign of Xi Jinping, thousands of officials included a dozen at the highest levels of governance in Shanxi were disciplined. This necessitated a scramble to find suitable personnel for many vacated offices.

== Chinese Communist Party ==
=== List of party secretaries ===
Image	Name	Term start	Term end	Ref.
	Cheng Zihua (程子华)	August 1949	September 1950	
	Lai Ruoyu (赖若愚)	September 1950	February 1952	
	Xie Xuegong (解学恭)	February 1952	July 1952	
	Gao Kelin (高克林)	February 1952	January 1953	
	Tao Lujia (陶鲁笳)	August 1956	August 1965	
	Wei Heng (卫恒)	August 1965	January 1967	
	Liu Geping (刘格平)	February 1967	April 1971	
	Xie Zhenhua (谢振华)	April 1971	May 1975	
	Wang Qian (王谦)	May 1975	October 1980	
	Huo Shilian (霍士廉)	October 1980	July 1985	
	Li Ligong (李立功)	July 1985	March 1991	
	Wang Maolin (王茂林)	March 1991	September 1993	
	Hu Fuguo (胡富国)	September 1993	12 June 1999	
	Tian Chengping (田成平)	12 June 1999	2 July 2005	
	Zhang Baoshun (张宝顺)	2 July 2005	31 May 2010	
	Yuan Chunqing (袁纯清)	31 May 2010	1 September 2014	
	Wang Rulin (王儒林)	1 September 2014	30 June 2016	
	Luo Huining (骆惠宁)	30 June 2016	30 November 2019	
	Lou Yangsheng (楼阳生)	30 November 2019	1 June 2021	
	Lin Wu (林武)	1 June 2021	29 December 2022	
	Lan Fo'an (蓝佛安)	29 December 2022	28 September 2023	
	Tang Dengjie (唐登杰)	28 October 2023	Incumbent	

== List of governors of Shanxi ==
No.	Officeholder	Term of office		Party	Ref.
No.	Officeholder	Took office	Left office	Party	Ref.
Governor of the Shanxi Provincial People's Government
1	Cheng Zihua (1905–1991)	August 1949	February 1951	Chinese Communist Party	
2	Lai Ruoyu (1910–1958)	February 1951	May 1952	Chinese Communist Party	
3	Pei Lisheng (1906–2000)	May 1952	February 1955	Chinese Communist Party	
Governor of the Shanxi Provincial People's Committee
(3)	Pei Lisheng (1906–2000)	February 1955	April 1956	Chinese Communist Party	
4	Wang Shiying (1905–1968)	April 1956	November 1958	Chinese Communist Party	
5	Wei Heng (1915–1967)	November 1958	December 1965	Chinese Communist Party	
6	Wang Qian (1917–2007)	December 1965	January 1967	Chinese Communist Party	
Director of the Shanxi Revolutionary Committee
7	Liu Geping (1904–1992)	January 1967	April 1971	Chinese Communist Party	
8	Xie Zhenhua (1916–2011)	April 1971	May 1975	Chinese Communist Party	
9	Wang Qian (1917–2007)	May 1975	December 1979	Chinese Communist Party	
Governor of the Shanxi Provincial People's Government
10	Luo Guibo (1907–1995)	December 1979	April 1983	Chinese Communist Party	
11	Wang Senhao (1933–2022)	April 1983	July 1992	Chinese Communist Party	
12	Hu Fuguo (born 1937)	23 July 1992	20 September 1993	Chinese Communist Party	
13	Sun Wensheng (born 1942)	September 1993	July 1999	Chinese Communist Party	
14	Liu Zhenhua (born 1940)	July 1999	January 2004	Chinese Communist Party	
15	Zhang Baoshun (born 1950)	19 February 2004	9 July 2005	Chinese Communist Party	
16	Yu Youjun (born 1953)	9 July 2005	3 September 2007	Chinese Communist Party	
17	Meng Xuenong (born 1949)	3 September 2007	14 September 2008	Chinese Communist Party	
18	Wang Jun (born 1952)	14 September 2008	19 December 2012	Chinese Communist Party	
19	Li Xiaopeng (born 1959)	29 January 2013	30 August 2016	Chinese Communist Party	
20	Lou Yangsheng (born 1959)	30 August 2016	5 December 2019	Chinese Communist Party	
21	Lin Wu (born 1962)	5 December 2019	4 June 2021	Chinese Communist Party	
22	Lan Fo'an (born 1962)	4 June 2021	29 December 2022	Chinese Communist Party	
23	Jin Xiangjun (born 1964)	29 December 2022	23 April 2025 (Note: Suspended since 12 April 2025. Resignation accepted by Standing Committee of Shanxi Provincial People's Congress on 23 April 2025)	Chinese Communist Party	
—	Vacant (Note: Executive Vice Governor Lu Dongliang presides over government work since 12 April 2025)				
24	Lu Dongliang (born 1973)	3 June 2025 (Note: Acting until 16 June 2025)	Incumbent	Chinese Communist Party	

== List of chairmen of Shanxi People's Congress ==
1. Ruan Posheng (阮泊生): 1979–1988
2. Wang Tingdong (王庭栋): 1988–1993
3. Lu Gongxun (卢功勋): 1993–2003
4. Tian Chengping (田成平): 2003–2005
5. Zhang Baoshun (张宝顺): 2006–2010
6. Yuan Chunqing (袁纯清): 2010–2014
7. Wang Rulin (王儒林): 2014–2016
8. Luo Huining (骆惠宁): 2016–2019
9. Lou Yangsheng (骆惠宁): 2019–2021
10. Lin Wu (林武): 2021–present

== List of chairmen of CPPCC Shanxi Committee ==
1. Tao Lujia (陶鲁笳): 1955–1965
2. Wei Heng (卫恒): 1965–1967
3. Wang Qian (王谦): 1977–1979
4. Zheng Lin (郑林): 1979–1983
5. Wu Guangtang (武光汤): 1983–1985
6. Li Xiuren (李修仁): 1985–1993
7. Wang Maolin (王茂林): 1993
8. Hu Fuguo (胡富国): 1994–1995
9. Guo Yuhuai (郭裕怀): 1995–2000
10. Tian Chengping (田成平): 2000–2001
11. Zheng Shekui (郑社奎): 2001–2003
12. Liu Zemin (刘泽民): 2003–2008
13. Jin Yinhuan (金银焕): 2008 (died in office)
14. Xue Yanzhong (薛延忠): 2009–2018
15. Huang Xiaowei (黄晓薇): 2018
16. Li Jia (李佳): 2018–present
