= Shanxi Provincial Committee of the Chinese People's Political Consultative Conference =

Shanxi Provincial Committee of the Chinese People's Political Consultative Conference 中国人民政治协商会议山西省委员会
- 13th
- Emblem of the Chinese People's Political Consultative Conference

Type
- Type: United front organ Constitutional convention (Historical); Legislature (Historical) of Chinese People's Political Consultative Conference

History
- Founded: February 1955; 71 years ago
- Preceded by: Shanxi Provincial People's Congress Consultative Committee

Leadership
- Chairperson: Zhang Chunlin

Website
- www.shanxizx.gov.cn

Chinese name
- Simplified Chinese: 中国人民政治协商会议山西省委员会
- Traditional Chinese: 中國人民政治協商會議山西省委員會
Transcriptions
Standard Mandarin
- Hanyu Pinyin: Zhōngguó Rénmín Zhèngzhì Xiéshāng Huìyì Shānxīshěng Wěiyuánhuì

Abbreviation
- Simplified Chinese: 山西省政协
- Traditional Chinese: 山西省政協
- Literal meaning: CPPCC Shanxi Provincial Committee
Transcriptions
Standard Mandarin
- Hanyu Pinyin: Shānxīshěng Zhèngxié

The Shanxi Provincial Committee of the Chinese People's Political Consultative Conference (Chinese: 中国人民政治协商会议山西省委员会) is the advisory body and a local organization of the Chinese People's Political Consultative Conference in Shanxi, China. It is supervised and directed by the Shanxi Provincial Committee of the Chinese Communist Party.

== History ==
The Shanxi Provincial Conference of Representatives from All Sectors of the People (山西省各界人民代表会议协商委员会) was an institutional form that exercised the functions of a local people’s congress prior to the establishment of formally elected local people’s congresses in 1954.

The first session of the First Conference was held in Taiyuan from March 12 to March 26, 1950. The meeting unanimously adopted three reports of the Shanxi Provincial People’s Government, elected the Second Committee of the Shanxi Provincial People’s Government, and established the First Consultative Committee of the Conference. In total, seven meetings of the Consultative Committee were convened during this period. The first session of the Second Conference was held in Taiyuan from April 13 to April 20, 1952. The meeting elected the members of the Shanxi Provincial People’s Government and the Second Consultative Committee of the Conference. This committee remained in office for more than two years and convened five consultative meetings.

From August 3 to August 11, 1954, following universal suffrage, the First Session of the First Shanxi Provincial People's Congress was held, marking the establishment of the formal local people’s congress system. From February 23 to February 28, 1955, the First Plenary Session of the First Committee of the Chinese People's Political Consultative Conference Shanxi Provincial Committee was convened in Taiyuan, at which the Shanxi Provincial Committee of the CPPCC was elected. The First Committee served until July 1959. The First Plenary Session of the Second Committee of the CPPCC Shanxi Provincial Committee was held in Taiyuan from August 8 to August 19, 1959, and its term ended in September 1964. The First Plenary Session of the Third Committee was held from October 5 to October 14, 1964.

On January 19, 1967, during the Cultural Revolution, the Shanxi Provincial CPPCC was taken over by rebel groups, its offices were occupied, and all activities of the Third Committee ceased. After the end of the Cultural Revolution, on November 5, 1975, a preparatory leading group was established to restore the CPPCC in Shanxi Province. From December 8 to December 15, 1977, the First Session of the Tenth Committee of the CPPCC Shanxi Provincial Committee was convened, and the term concluded in 1982.

=== Anti-corruption campaign ===
On 26 August 2022, Li Jia was put under investigation for alleged "serious violations of discipline and laws" by the Central Commission for Discipline Inspection (CCDI), the party's internal disciplinary body, and the National Supervisory Commission, the highest anti-corruption agency of China. His qualification for representative of the 19th National Congress of the Chinese Communist Party was terminated, and demoted from provincial-ministerial level to deputy provincial-ministerial level, and will keep a position as 2nd-class investigator (二级巡视员).

On 16 December 2024, Wu Cunrong was put under investigation for alleged "serious violations of discipline and laws" by the Central Commission for Discipline Inspection (CCDI), the party's internal disciplinary body, and the National Supervisory Commission, the highest anti-corruption agency of China.

== Term ==
=== 1st ===
- Term: February 1955–August 1959
- Chairperson: Tao Lujia
- Vice Chairpersons: Wang Shiying, Deng Chumin, Liu Shaobai, Zhi Yinglin, Ji Gongquan (January 1955–), Zheng Lin, Song Zichun (March 1956–)

=== 2nd ===
- Term: August 1959–October 1964
- Chairperson: Tao Lujia
- Vice Chairpersons: Wang Shiying, Zheng Lin, Ma Lin, Wang Mengling, Feng Sutao, Liu Shaobai, Qiao Qiming, Song Zichun, Zhang Juanxuan, Zhang Dehan, Yang Zixiu, Ji Gongquan (August 1959–)

=== 3rd ===
- Term: October 1964–November 1975
- Chairperson: Tao Lujia (–December 1965) → Wei Heng (December 1965–died in 1967)
- Vice Chairpersons: Zheng Lin, Liu Shaobai, Ji Gongquan, He Yingcai, Ma Lin, Zhang Dehan, An Zhifan, Zhang Juanxuan, Song Zichun, Yang Zixiu, Feng Sutao, Qiao Qiming (October 1964–)

=== 4th ===
- Term: December 1977–April 1983
- Chairperson: Zheng Lin (–December 1980) → Wang Qian (December 1979–)
- Vice Chairpersons: Zhu Weihua, Fan Qingjiang, Shao Xiangyi, Li Zhimin, Yan Kaiyuan, Chen Shunli, Zheng Lin (later added as Chairperson), Yang Zixiu (died in 1978), Ma Guishu (–December 1979), Feng Sutao (–December 1979), Jiao Guonai (–December 1979), Zhang Bangying (–December 1979), An Zhifan, Ma Lin, Zhang Juanxuan, Yu Lin, Tao Jian, Gao Muhong, Zhu Jingzi, Ling Daqi, Li Shunda, Wang Dingnan, Chen Gongqing, Yang Mingbao (December 1979–), Yan Dingchu (December 1980–)
- Working Group for Resumption of Work
- Leader: Zheng Lin (November 1975–December 1977)
- Deputy Leader: Liu Xiufeng (November 1975)

=== 5th ===
- Term: April 1983–January 1988
- Chairperson: Wu Guangtang (died in April 1985) → Li Xiuren (May 1985–)
- Vice Chairpersons: Zhu Weihua, Wang Xiujin, Chen Shunli, Tao Jian, Zhu Jingzi, Ling Daqi, Wang Dingnan, Yang Mingbao, Zhao Yuting, Pan Ruizheng, Yao Dianzhong, Shi Xingsan (April 1983–), Zhang Tianyi (May 1985–), Wang Xi, Ma Feng, Tang Fangde (May 1986–)

=== 6th ===
- Term: January 1988–January 1993
- Chairperson: Li Xiuren
- Vice Chairpersons: Wang Xi, Ling Daqi, Yang Mingbao, Yao Dianzhong, Shi Xingsan, Ma Feng, Tang Fangde, Chen Degui, Qin Guodong (January 1988–), Lu Zhengxi (April 1989–)

=== 7th ===
- Term: January 1993–1998
- Chairperson: Wang Maolin (January 1993–) → Guo Yuhuai (February 1993–) → Hu Fuguo (March 1994–)
- Vice Chairpersons: Lu Zhengxi, Wu Sansong, Yang Mingbao, Qin Guodong, Liu Bo, Song Shaohua, Jin Chengxu, Tang Fangde, Qi Shouchun, Zhang Changzhen (January 1993–), Wu Huiqin (February 1995–), Wan Liangshi, Zhao Fengxiang (April 1996–)
- Secretary-General: Cheng Zhanyi (January 1993–)

=== 8th ===
- Term: January 1998–January 2003
- Chairperson: Tian Chengping → Zheng Shekui (February 2001–)
- Vice Chairpersons: Song Shaohua, Jin Chengxu, Qi Shouchun, Wu Huiqin, Zhao Fengxiang, Nie Xiangting, Zhang Zhengming, Xu Daiyi, Bian Mingtao, Wan Liangshi (February 2001–)

=== 9th ===
- Term: January 2003–January 2008
- Chairperson: Liu Zemin
- Vice Chairpersons: Xue Rongzhe, Wu Jinwen, Nie Xiangting, Zhang Zhengming, Bian Mingtao, Lü Rizhou, Yan Aiying, Han Ruying, Wu Bowei, Zhou Ran
- Secretary-General: Tian Xirong

=== 10th ===
- Term: January 2008–January 2013
- Chairperson: Jin Yinhuan → Xue Yanzhong (January 2009–)
- Vice Chairpersons: Guo Liangxiao, Han Ruying, Zhou Ran, Li Yanhong, Li Tansheng, Ling Zhengce, Wei Xiaochun, Liu Diansheng
- Secretary-General: Yan Qinsheng

=== 11th ===
- Term: January 2013–January 2018
- Chairperson: Xue Yanzhong
- Vice Chairpersons: Li Yanhong (January 2016–), Ling Zhengce (–July 2014), Wei Xiaochun, Liu Diansheng, Wang Ning, Zhu Xianqi, Li Yue'e, Zhang Youjun, Zhang Pu (January 2016–), Jiang Xinwen (January 2016–)
- Secretary-General: Yan Gensheng

=== 12th ===
- Term: January 2018–January 2023
- Chairperson: Huang Xiaowei (–August 2018) → Li Jia (January 2019–August 2022)
- Vice Chairpersons: Li Zhengyin, Li Xiaobo, Zhang Ruipeng, Xi Xiaojun, Li Wuzhang, Li Qingshan, Xie Hong, Li Sijin, Wang Liwei (January 2021–)
- Secretary-General: Zhao Guangguo (–April 2019) → Zhang Qiyun (January 2020–)

=== 13th ===
- Term: January 2023–2028
- Chairperson: Wu Cunrong (–December 2024) → Zhang Chunlin (January 2025–)
- Vice Chairpersons: Li Zhengyin, Zhang Fuming, Li Xiaobo, Li Qingshan, Li Sijin, Wang Liwei, Yan Chenxi, Wang Lei, Xu Guangguo (January 2024–), Zhang Jifu (January 2025–), Zheng Liansheng (January 2025–), Tang Zhiping (February 2026–)
- Secretary-General: Zhang Qiyun (–January 2025) → Mao Yimin (January 2025–)
