= Shanxi Provincial People's Government =

Shanxi Provincial People's Government 山西省人民政府
- Established: May 1949; 77 years ago

Leadership
- Governor: Lu Dongliang; 3 June 2025
- Parent body: Central People's Government; Shanxi Provincial People's Congress
- Elected by: Shanxi Provincial People's Congress

Meeting place
- Headquarters

Website
- www.shanxi.gov.cn

The Shanxi Provincial People's Government is the local administrative agency of Shanxi. It is officially elected by the Shanxi Provincial People's Congress and is formally responsible to the Shanxi Provincial People's Congress and its Standing Committee. Under the country's one-party system, the governor is subordinate to the secretary of the Shanxi Provincial Committee of the Chinese Communist Party. The Provincial government is headed by a governor, currently Lu Dongliang.

== History ==
In May 1949, the entire Shanxi Province was liberated. In August of the same year, the North China People's Government formally appointed the members of the Shanxi Provincial People's Government. In February 1955, the Shanxi Provincial People's Government was reorganized into the Shanxi Provincial People's Committee. In March 1967, the Shanxi Provincial Revolutionary Committee was established. In December 1979, the Shanxi Provincial Revolutionary Committee was abolished and the Shanxi Provincial People's Government was re-established.

Since Yan Xishan came to power in Shanxi, the Shanxi Provincial Government has long been located at the former site of the Governor's Mansion at No. 101 Fudong Street, Xinghualing District. Until September 1, 2017, the Shanxi Provincial Government moved to its new address at No. 3 Shengfu Street, Xiaodian District.

== Organization ==
The organization of the Shanxi Provincial People's Government includes:

- General Office of the Shanxi Provincial People's Government

=== Component Departments ===
- Shanxi Provincial Development and Reform Commission
- Shanxi Provincial Department of Education
- Shanxi Provincial Department of Science and Technology
- Shanxi Provincial Department of Industry and Information Technology
- Shanxi Provincial Public Security Department
- Shanxi Provincial Department of Civil Affairs
- Shanxi Provincial Department of Justice
- Shanxi Provincial Department of Finance
- Shanxi Provincial Department of Human Resources and Social Security
- Shanxi Provincial Department of Natural Resources
- Shanxi Provincial Department of Ecology and Environment
- Shanxi Provincial Department of Housing and Urban-Rural Development
- Shanxi Provincial Department of Transportation
- Shanxi Provincial Water Resources Department
- Shanxi Provincial Department of Agriculture and Rural Affairs
- Shanxi Provincial Department of Commerce
- Shanxi Provincial Department of Culture and Tourism
- Shanxi Provincial Health Commission
- Shanxi Provincial Department of Veterans Affairs
- Shanxi Provincial Emergency Management Department
- Shanxi Provincial Audit Office
- Foreign Affairs Office of Shanxi Provincial People's Government

=== Directly affiliated special institution ===
- State-owned Assets Supervision and Administration Commission of Shanxi Provincial People's Government

=== Organizations under the government ===
- Shanxi Provincial Administration for Market Regulation
- Shanxi Provincial Radio and Television Bureau
- Shanxi Provincial Sports Bureau
- Shanxi Provincial Bureau of Statistics
- Shanxi Provincial People's Government Research Office
- Shanxi Provincial Administrative Approval Service Administration
- Shanxi Provincial Petition Bureau
- Shanxi Provincial Local Financial Administration Bureau
- Shanxi Provincial Energy Bureau
- Shanxi Provincial Cultural Relics Bureau
- Shanxi Provincial Civil Air Defense Office
- Shanxi Provincial Medical Insurance Bureau (Deputy Department Level)

=== Departmental management organization ===
- The Shanxi Provincial Bureau of Grain and Material Reserves is managed by the Provincial Development and Reform Commission.
- The Shanxi Provincial Private Economy Development Bureau is managed by the Provincial Department of Industry and Information Technology.
- The Shanxi Provincial Prison Administration Bureau is managed by the Provincial Department of Justice.
- The Shanxi Provincial Forestry and Grassland Bureau is managed by the Provincial Department of Natural Resources.
- The Shanxi Provincial Drug Supervision and Administration Bureau is managed by the Provincial Market Supervision Administration.

=== Directly affiliated institutions ===
- Shanxi Academy of Social Sciences
- Shanxi Agricultural University
- Shanxi Forestry Research Institute
- Shanxi Coal Geology Bureau
- Shanxi Provincial Bureau of Geology and Mineral Exploration and Development
- Shanxi Provincial Supply and Marketing Cooperatives Federation
- Shanxi Provincial People's Government Disability Affairs Committee
- Shanxi Provincial Urban Collective Industrial Federation
- China Coal Museum
- Shanxi Provincial Geological Survey Bureau
- Shanxi Public Resources Trading Center
- Wanjiazhai Yellow River Diversion Project Administration
- Shanxi Agricultural Machinery Development Center
- Yungang Research Institute (Deputy Department Level)

=== Dispatched agencies ===
- Shanxi Transformation and Comprehensive Reform Demonstration Zone Management Committee
- Shanxi Provincial People's Government Office in Beijing
- Shanxi Provincial People's Government Office in Shanghai
- Shanxi Provincial People's Government Office in Guangzhou (Shenzhen)
- Shanxi Provincial People's Government Office in Tianjin
- Shanxi Provincial People's Government Office in Xinjiang

== See also ==
- Politics of Shanxi
  - Shanxi Provincial People's Congress
  - Shanxi Provincial People's Government
    - Governor of Shanxi
  - Shanxi Provincial Committee of the Chinese Communist Party
    - Party Secretary of Shanxi
  - Shanxi Provincial Committee of the Chinese People's Political Consultative Conference
