= Jianhua =

Jianhua may refer to:

== People ==
=== 健华 ===
- Li Jianhua (footballer) (Chinese: 李健华), Chinese football defender

=== 剑华 ===
- Li Jianhua (diplomat) (Chinese: 李剑华), Chinese diplomat
- Zhao Jianhua (Chinese: 赵剑华; born 1965), Chinese badminton player

=== 建华 ===
- Chen Jianhua (Chinese: 陈建华), Chinese politician
- Dong Jianhua, better known as Tung Chee-hwa (Chinese: 董建华; 1937–2026), Hong Kong businessman and politician
- Gao Jianhua (Chinese: 高建华; born 1952), author of the 1987 autobiography Born Red
- Gong Jianhua (Chinese: 龚建华), Chinese politician
- Huo Jianhua, better known as Wallace Huo (Chinese: 霍建华), Taiwanese actor and singer
- Ji Jianhua (Chinese: 姬建华; born 1982), Chinese Olympic cyclist
- Li Jianhua (politician) (Chinese: 李建华), Chinese politician
- Lin Jianhua (Chinese: 林建华), Chinese chemist
- Peng Jianhua (Chinese: 彭建华; born 1996), Chinese long-distance runner
- Wang Jianhua (politician, born 1952) (Chinese: 王建华; born 1952), Chinese politician
- Wang Jianhua (politician, born 1954) (Chinese: 王建华; born 1954), Chinese professor of electrical engineering and politician
- Wei Jianhua (Chinese: 魏建华; born 1979), Chinese javelin thrower
- Xiao Jianhua (Chinese: 肖建华), Chinese-Canadian businessman
- Xie Jianhua (major general) (Chinese: 谢建华), Chinese major general
- Xie Jianhua (judoka) (Chinese: 谢建华; born 1976), Chinese judoka
- Yao Jianhua (Chinese: 姚建华), Chinese politician
- Yu Jianhua (Chinese: 俞建华; 1961–2024), Chinese politician and diplomat
- Zhang Jianhua (Chinese: 章建华), Chinese politician
- Zhu Jianhua (Chinese: 朱建华; born 1963), Chinese high jumper

=== Others ===
- Guan Jianhua, Chinese table tennis player
- Jianhua Lu, professor of electrical engineering at Tsinghua University
- Yang Jianhua, Chinese archaeologist
- Jianhua Zhang, Chinese electrical engineer

== Places ==
- Jianhua District, seat of Qiqihar, Heilongjiang, China
