= Shanxi Military District =

- 中国人民解放军山西省军区
- Founded: September 1, 1949; 76 years ago
- Country: People's Republic of China
- Allegiance: Chinese Communist Party
- Type: Military district
- Role: Command and control
- Part of: People's Liberation Army
- Headquarters: Taiyuan, Shanxi

Commanders
- Commander: Major general (shaojiang) Tian Yue
- Political Commisar: Major general (shaojiang) Xu Baolong

Chinese name
- Simplified Chinese: 中国人民解放军山西省军区
- Traditional Chinese: 中國人民解放軍山西省軍區
Transcriptions
Standard Mandarin
- Hanyu Pinyin: Zhōngguó Rénmín Jiěfàngjūn Sìchuānshěng Jūnqū

The Shanxi Military District (Chinese: 中国人民解放军山西省军区; full name People's Liberation Army Shanxi Military District or PLA Shanxi Military District) is a military district of the National Defense Mobilization Department of the Central Military Commission in China.

== History ==
The Shanxi Military District was founded on 1 September 1949.

== Leaders ==
=== Commanders ===
Name (English)	Name (Chinese)	Tenure begins	Tenure ends	Ref.
Cheng Zihua	程子华	August 1949	September 1950	
Xiao Wenjiu	萧文玖	September 1950	June 1951	
Xiao Siming	萧思明	June 1951	April 1952	
Wang Zifeng	王紫峰	April 1952	November 1955	
Xiao Xinhuai	萧新槐	January 1956	July 1956	
Wang Zifeng	王紫峰	July 1956	December 1961	
Chen Ziyu	陈金钰	March 1962	November 1968	
Xie Zhenhua	谢振华	November 1968	January 1975	
Wang Fuzhi	王扶之	January 1975	May 1980	
Geng Shuming	耿淑明	November 1980	March 1983	
Zhang Guangyou	张广有	March 1983	July 1985	
Yu Hongli	于鸿礼	July 1985	March 1992	
Dong Yunhai	董云海	March 1992	August 1996	
Liu Yinchao	刘荫超	August 1996	August 2000	
Duan Duanwu	段端武	August 2000	June 2003	
Zheng Chuanfu	郑传福	June 2003	December 2005	
Fang Wenping	方文平	December 2005	September 2010	
Liu Yunhai	刘云海	September 2010	December 2013	
Leng Jiesong	冷杰松	December 2013	August 2016	
Zou Xiaoping	邹小平	2017	August 2018	
Han Qiang	韩强	August 2018	August 2022	
Deng Yu'en	邓玉恩	August 2022	October 2023	
Tian Yue	田越	October 2023		

=== Political commissars ===
Name (English)	Name (Chinese)	Tenure begins	Tenure ends	Ref.
Cheng Zihua	程子华	October 1949	September 1950	
Lai Ruoyu	赖若愚	September 1950	October 1952	
Gao Kelin	高克林	October 1952	August 1953	
Tao Lujia	陶鲁笳	August 1953	October 1965	
Zhang Riqing	张日清	March 1960	April 1971	Second Political Commissar
Wei Heng	卫恒	October 1965	January 1967	First Political Commissar
Liu Geping	刘格平	March 1967	April 1971	First Political Commissar
Cao Zhongnan	曹中南	March 1970	May 1978	
Liu Shihong	刘世洪	March 1970	June 1975	
Li Bude	李布德	October 1970	March 1983	
Liu Yantian	刘炎田	May 1972	November 1975	
Zheng Xiaofeng	郑效峰	June 1975	July 1981	
Wang Qian	王谦	April 1977	February 1980	First Political Commissar
Wang Bicheng	王弼臣	December 1978	August 1981	
Huo Shilian	霍士廉	February 1980	July 1983	First Political Commissar
Li Ligong	李立功	July 1983	July 1985	First Political Commissar
Luo Jinghui	罗敬辉	July 1985	June 1990	
Cao Ding	曹丁	June 1990	February 1993	
Zhang Zhen	张珍	February 1993	April 1994	
Chen Deyi	陈德毅	April 1994	December 2000	
Kuai Wanzeng	郐万增	December 2000	December 2003	
Li Guohui	李国辉	January 2004	July 2008	
Zhang Shaohua	张少华	July 2008	March 2015	
Guo Zhigang	郭志刚	March 2015	October 2018	
Wei Wenbo	魏文波	October 2018	January 2019	
Sha Chenglu	沙成录	May 2020	July 2022	
Xu Baolong	徐宝龙	July 2022		

=== Political commissars ===
Name (English)	Name (Chinese)	Tenure begins	Tenure ends	Ref.
Han Weimin	韩卫民	June 1954	April 1959	
Cao Yuqing	曹玉清	April 1959	February 1962	
Zhang Yibo	张一波	February 1962	February 1965	
Wang Xiangyun	王祥云	February 1965	August 1968	
Yuan Tao	袁涛	August 1968	October 1970	
Li Zhiguang	李之光	October 1970	May 1978	
Li Hui	李惠	May 1978	January 1981	
Liu Jian	刘健	January 1981	March 1983	
Meng Lingchun	孟令春	March 1983	July 1985	
Liang Huisheng	梁惠生	July 1985	November 1986	
Liu Yinchao	刘荫超	November 1986	June 1988	
Shu Guohan	舒国汉	June 1988	June 1990	
Wang Ruiqi	王瑞琪	June 1990	March 1992	
Liang Huisheng	梁惠生	March 1992	August 1996	
Gao Fu	高富	August 1996	August 1999	
Ma Jingran	马景然	August 1999	February 2002	
Li Dongjun	李东军	February 2002	December 2005	
Ji Yafu	姬亚夫	December 2005	2010	
Jiang Shixin	蒋世欣	2010	2010	
Zhang Ren	张韧	2011	2012	
Zhao Jilu	赵冀鲁	2012	2012	
Xu Hongsheng	徐洪生	2012	2013	
Wu Guozhi	吴国志	2013	2017	
