= Party Secretary of Shanxi =

Provincial government position in China

Secretary of the Shanxi Provincial Committee of the Chinese Communist Party
- 中国共产党山西省委员会书记
- Emblem of the Chinese Communist Party

- Flag of the Chinese Communist Party

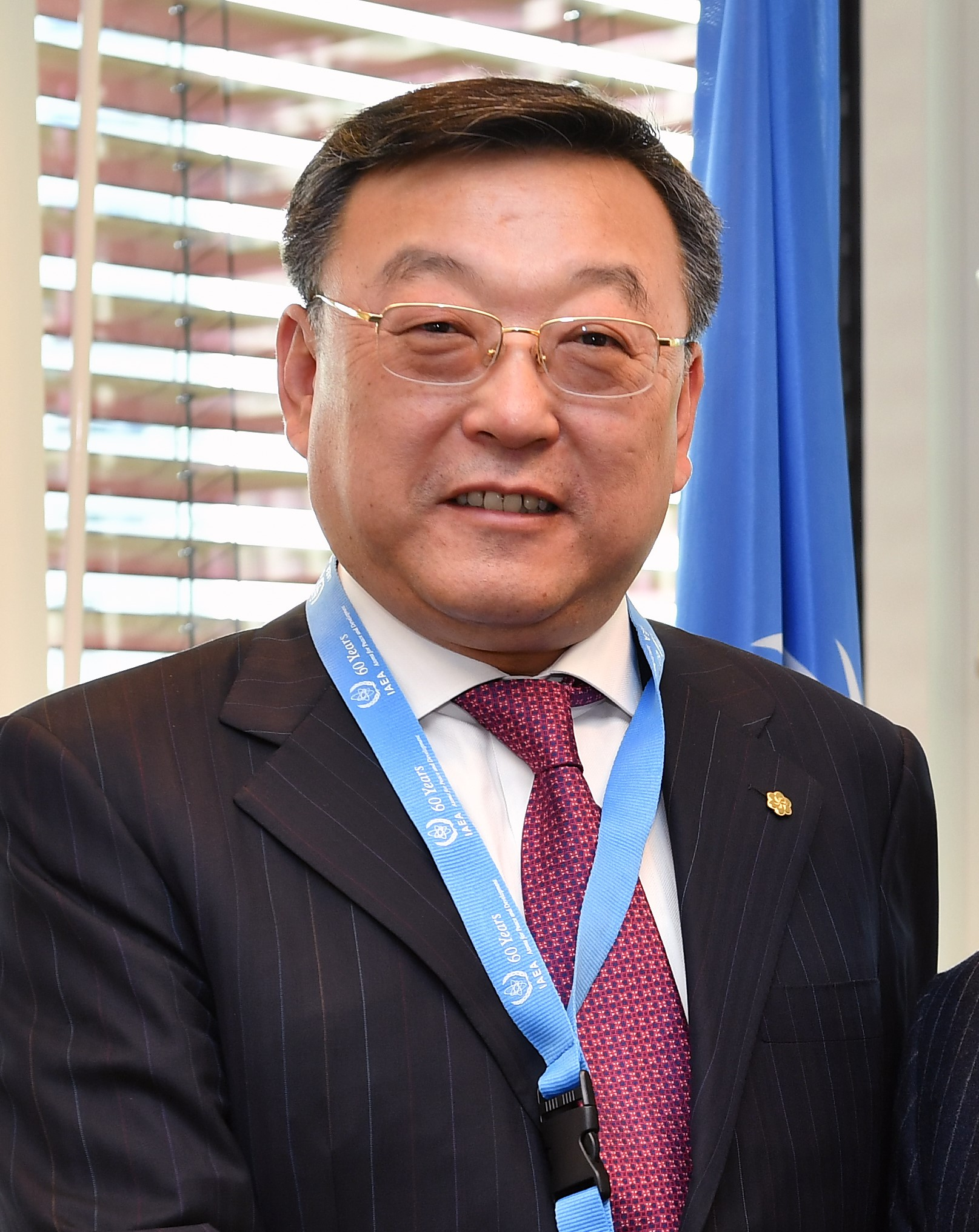
- Incumbent; Tang Dengjie since 28 October 2023
- Shanxi Provincial Committee of the Chinese Communist Party
- Type: Party Committee Secretary
- Status: Provincial and ministerial-level official
- Member of: Shanxi Provincial Standing Committee
- Nominator: Central Committee
- Appointer: Shanxi Provincial Committee; Central Committee
- Inaugural holder: Cheng Zihua
- Formation: August 1949
- Deputy: Deputy Secretary; Secretary-General

The secretary of the Liaoning Provincial Committee of the Chinese Communist Party is the leader of the Shanxi Provincial Committee of the Chinese Communist Party (CCP). As the CCP is the sole ruling party of the People's Republic of China (PRC), the secretary is the highest ranking post in Shanxi.

The secretary is officially appointed by the CCP Central Committee based on the recommendation of the CCP Organization Department, which is then approved by the Politburo and its Standing Committee. The secretary can be also appointed by a plenary meeting of the Shanxi Provincial Committee, but the candidate must be the same as the one approved by the central government. The secretary leads the Standing Committee of the Shanxi Provincial Committee, and is usually a member of the CCP Central Committee. The secretary leads the work of the Provincial Committee and its Standing Committee. The secretary is outranks the governor, who is generally the deputy secretary of the committee.

The current secretary is Tang Dengjie, who took office on 28 October 2023.

== List of party secretaries ==
Image	Name	Term start	Term end	Ref.
	Cheng Zihua (程子华)	August 1949	September 1950	
	Lai Ruoyu (赖若愚)	September 1950	February 1952	
	Xie Xuegong (解学恭)	February 1952	July 1952	
	Gao Kelin (高克林)	February 1952	January 1953	
	Tao Lujia (陶鲁笳)	August 1956	August 1965	
	Wei Heng (卫恒)	August 1965	January 1967	
	Liu Geping (刘格平)	February 1967	April 1971	
	Xie Zhenhua (谢振华)	April 1971	May 1975	
	Wang Qian (王谦)	May 1975	October 1980	
	Huo Shilian (霍士廉)	October 1980	July 1985	
	Li Ligong (李立功)	July 1985	March 1991	
	Wang Maolin (王茂林)	March 1991	September 1993	
	Hu Fuguo (胡富国)	September 1993	12 June 1999	
	Tian Chengping (田成平)	12 June 1999	2 July 2005	
	Zhang Baoshun (张宝顺)	2 July 2005	31 May 2010	
	Yuan Chunqing (袁纯清)	31 May 2010	1 September 2014	
	Wang Rulin (王儒林)	1 September 2014	30 June 2016	
	Luo Huining (骆惠宁)	30 June 2016	30 November 2019	
	Lou Yangsheng (楼阳生)	30 November 2019	1 June 2021	
	Lin Wu (林武)	1 June 2021	29 December 2022	
	Lan Fo'an (蓝佛安)	29 December 2022	28 September 2023	
	Tang Dengjie (唐登杰)	28 October 2023	Incumbent	
