= Xie Jianhua =

Xie Jianhua, may refer to:

- Xie Jianhua (judoka), Chinese male judoka.
- Xie Jianhua (major general), major general in the People's Liberation Army of China who served as political commissar of the Tianjin Garrison Command from 2007 to 2012.
