= Li Jianhua =

Li Jianhua may refer to:

- Li Jianhua (politician)
- Li Jianhua (diplomat)
- Li Jianhua (footballer)
