= Daqiu =

Daqiu may refer to:

- Daqiu Village (大丘村), Anping, Lianyuan, Loudi, Hunan
- Daqiu Village (大坵村), Jiuru, Pingtung, Taiwan
- Daqiu Village (大丘里), Lioujia District, Tainan, Taiwan
- Daqiu Islet (大坵嶼) or Greater Qiu Islet, Wuqiu, Kinmen, Fujian, Republic of China (Taiwan)
- Daqiu Island (大坵島), Beigan Township, Lienchiang County (the Matsu Islands), Fujian, Republic of China (Taiwan)

People and fictional characters with the given name Daqiu include:

- Li Daqiu (born 1953), Chinese politician
- Xiao Daqiu (蕭大球; 541–551), a descendant of Emperor Jianwen of Liang
- Zhou Daqiu, character in the 2005 Singaporean television drama Portrait of Home
