= Cheng Zihua =

Chinese politician

- 程子华
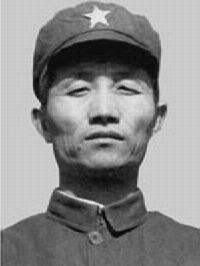
- Cheng Zihua

Vice Chairman of the Chinese People's Political Consultative Conference
- In office 12 September 1980 – 10 April 1988
- Chairman: Deng Xiaoping; Deng Yingchao

Minister of Civil Affairs
- In office 5 March 1978 – 4 May 1982
- Premier: Hua Guofeng; Zhao Ziyang
- Preceded by: New title
- Succeeded by: Cui Naifu

Minister of Commerce
- In office 11 September 1958 – 18 February 1960
- Premier: Zhou Enlai
- Preceded by: Chen Yun
- Succeeded by: Yao Yilin

Party Secretary of Shanxi
- In office August 1949 – February 1951
- Preceded by: New title
- Succeeded by: Lai Ruoyu

Governor of Shanxi
- In office August 1949 – February 1951
- Preceded by: Office established
- Succeeded by: Pei Lisheng

Personal details
- Born: 20 June 1905 Xiezhou, Shanxi, Qing Empire
- Died: 30 March 1991 (aged 85) Beijing, People's Republic of China
- Party: Chinese Communist Party
- Spouse: Zhang Hui
- Children: 2
- Education: Republic of China Military Academy

Military service
- Allegiance: People's Republic of China
- Branch/service: People's Liberation Army Ground Force
- Years of service: 1926–1950
- Rank: Army group commander (Equivalent to Senior general)
- Battles/wars: Second Sino-Japanese War; Chinese Civil War

Chinese name
- Simplified Chinese: 程子华
- Traditional Chinese: 程子華
Transcriptions
Standard Mandarin
- Hanyu Pinyin: Chéng Zǐhuá

Cheng Zihua (Chinese: 程子华; June 20, 1905 – March 30, 1991) was a Chinese politician and military general. He was born in Yuncheng, Shanxi Province. He was the 1st Chinese Communist Party Committee Secretary and governor of his home province. He was a delegate to the 3rd (1964-1975), 4th (1975-1978) and 5th (1978-1983) National People's Congress. Cheng was an important part of the Third Front campaign to develop basic and national defense industry in China's interior.

== Career ==
=== Early career ===
At 21 years old in 1927, Cheng joined the Communist Party. He participated in Jiangxi Soviet, was part of the Long March, and fought against Japan during the Second-Sino Japanese War and against the Nationalists during the on-going Chinese Civil War.

=== 1949 and after ===
In 1949, Cheng became the Party Secretary of Shanxi. He later served as Minister of Commerce and Vice Director of the Planning Commission.

=== Third Front construction ===
Cheng strongly supported the Third Front campaign to develop basic industry and national defense industry in China's interior. Cheng wrote in his memoirs, "Preparing for war was absolutely necessary" because (1) the United States "had launched a war of aggression against Vietnam at our southern border" and (2) because of increasing Soviet hostility towards China, "the situation at our northern border was very tense." In Cheng's ultimate evaluation, the Third Front was a major success because it had rectified "the almost total lack of industry in the interior" which had existed before 1949 and persisted into the 1960s.

As part of his work on the Third Front, Cheng led an investigative team that conducted regional surveys to start preparations for the Chengdu-Kunming railroad and industrial complexes near Panzhihua, Liupanshui, and Chongqing. Cheng first visited Panzhihua in mid-1964 when only eight households lived there. In his memoirs, Cheng highlights Panzhihua's suitability for a strategic industrial rear because its "lofty mountains and steep hills" would make it difficult for enemy infantry to access or for enemy airplanes to bomb.

Before beginning to conduct the surveys, Cheng led the team to study Mao Zedong and Zhou Enlai's comments on the Third Front in order to emphasize the importance of the Third Front campaign; Cheng also led the team in discussion sessions focused on Mao's texts On Practice, On Contradiction, and Oppose Book Worship in a further effort to build ideological cohesion among the team.

Party political offices
New title	Party Secretary of Shanxi; 1949–1951	Succeeded by Lai Ruoyu
Government offices
New title	Governor of Shanxi; 1949–1951	Succeeded by Pei Lisheng
Preceded by Chen Yun	Minister of Commerce; 1958–1960	Succeeded by Yao Yilin
New title	Minister of Civil Affairs; 1978–1982	Succeeded by Cui Naifu
Military offices
New title	Commander of Shanxi Military District; 1949–1950	Succeeded by Xiao Wenjiu
New title	Political Commissar of Shanxi Military District; 1949–1950	Succeeded by Lai Ruoyu
