= Lan Fo'an =

Chinese politician (born 1962)

- 蓝佛安
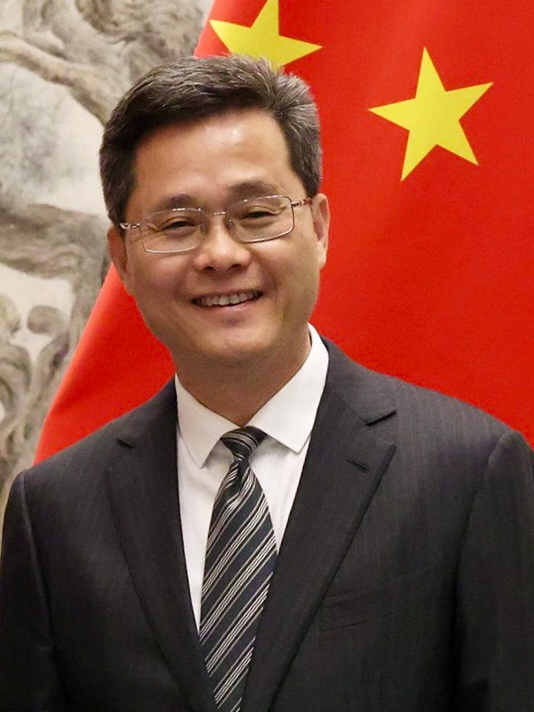
- Lan in 2024

15th Minister of Finance
- Incumbent
- Assumed office 24 October 2023
- Premier: Li Qiang
- Preceded by: Liu Kun

Party Secretary of Shanxi
- In office 29 December 2022 – 28 September 2023
- Governor: Jin Xiangjun
- Preceded by: Lin Wu
- Succeeded by: Tang Dengjie

Chairperson of the Shanxi Provincial People's Congress
- In office January 2023 – November 2023
- Preceded by: Lin Wu
- Succeeded by: Tang Dengjie

Governor of Shanxi
- In office 4 June 2021 – 29 December 2022
- Party Secretary: Lin Wu
- Preceded by: Lin Wu
- Succeeded by: Jin Xiangjun

Personal details
- Born: June 1962 (age 64) Huidong County, Guangdong, China
- Party: Chinese Communist Party
- Education: Zhongnan University of Economics and Law; South China University of Technology

Chinese name
- Simplified Chinese: 蓝佛安
- Traditional Chinese: 藍佛安
Transcriptions
Standard Mandarin
- Hanyu Pinyin: Lán Fó'ān

Lan Fo'an (Chinese: 蓝佛安; born June 1962) is a Chinese politician who is currently serving as minister and party branch secretary of Finance. He previously served as the Party Secretary of Shanxi.

== Early life ==
Lan was born in Huidong County, Guangdong, in June 1962. After graduating from Hubei College of Finance and Economics (now Zhongnan University of Economics and Law) in 1985, he was dispatched to the Ministry of Finance.

== Political career ==
Beginning in November 1988, he served in several posts in the Guangdong Provincial Finance Department, including section member, principal staff member, and director. In March 1999, he was appointed vice mayor of Dongguan, a city in Guangdong, but held the position for only two-and-a-half years. He then moved back to the Guangdong Provincial Finance Department and was appointed its deputy head. In April 2007, he was promoted to party branch secretary of Guangdong Provincial Audit Department, concurrently holding the head position since March 2008. In March 2015, he was appointed party secretary of Shaoguan, another Guangdong city, making him the top political leader there. He was promoted to vice governor of Guangdong in January 2016.

In March 2017, he was transferred to the neighboring Hainan province, and he was appointed secretary of its Commission for Discipline Inspection, the Party's agency in charge of anti-corruption efforts. He also served as director of the Hainan Provincial Supervisory Commission. He became a member of the Standing Committee of the CCP Hainan Provincial Committee.

He served as a delegate to the 19th CCP National Congress in October 2017. From 2017 to 2022, he was a member of the 19th Central Commission for Discipline Inspection. He was also a member of the 13th National People's Congress from 2018 to 2023. In April 2021, he was transferred to north China's Shanxi province and appointed deputy party secretary. On June 4, he was named acting governor of Shanxi, replacing Lin Wu.

In October 2022, he was elected as a member of the CCP Central Committee at the 20th CCP National Congress. In December 2022, he was appointed secretary of the CCP Committee of Shanxi province. He stepped down from the post on 28 September 2023. On 28 September 2023, he was appointed the CCP committee secretary of the Ministry of Finance.

== Finance minister ==
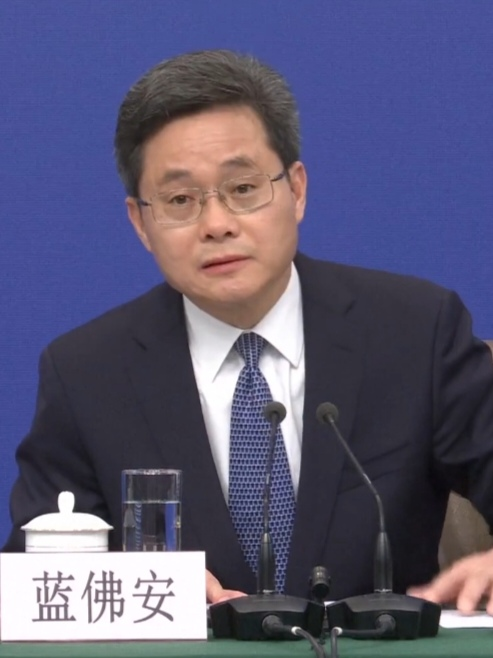
Lan as finance minister, 2024

On 24 October 2023, he was appointed the Minister of Finance.

In October 2024, Lan announced that the Chinese government would issue US$325 billion in special bonds to boost China's economy amidst a sharp property market downturn.

In October 2026, Lan published an article in Qiushi, in which he called for an increased coverage of interest subsidy policy, the onboarding of more implementing agencies, and moderately raised funding limits to increase consumption potential and allow private investment.

=== China's hidden debt ===
In November 2024, he announced a plan to cut 'hidden' debt by 10 trillion RMB, lowering local government interest payments by 600 billion RMB (US$83.9 billion) over five years. Lan revealed that local governments' hidden debt was 14.3 trillion RMB (US$2 trillion) by the end of 2023. However, there were disagreements as the International Monetary Fund (IMF) estimated that China's local government financing vehicle debt is at 66 trillion RMB. He noted that 2 trillion RMB will be allocated yearly from 2024 to 2026, with the aim of reducing hidden debt to 2.3 trillion RMB (US$320.9 billion) by 2028. On November 8, 2024, China approved this plan to assist local governments in refinancing their substantial debt. Lan described this measure as a significant change in China's debt restructuring and assured that the government debt risk is manageable.

=== China-US trade war ===
In March 2025, Lan stated that reserves are ready for uncertainties as China tackles to ensure growth amidst a trade war with the US. During a G20 meeting in Washington in April 2025, he, along with China's central bank governor, warned of "insufficient" global economic growth because of trade wars and tariff. Lan urged other countries for multilateral cooperation stating that China supported dialogue "on equal footing" to settle trade tensions.

Party political offices
Preceded by Zheng Zhentao	Party Secretary of Shaoguan; 2015–2016	Succeeded by Jiang Ling
Preceded by Ma Yongxia	Secretary of Hainan Commission for Discipline Inspection; 2017–2021	Succeeded by Chen Guomeng
Preceded by Lin Wu	Specifically-designated Deputy Party Secretary of Shanxi; 2021	Succeeded by Shang Liguang
Preceded by Lin Wu	Party Secretary of Shanxi; 2022–2023	Succeeded by Tang Dengjie
Preceded by Liu Kun	Party Secretary of the Ministry of Finance; 2023–present	Incumbent
Government offices
Preceded by Zeng Shouxi (曾寿喜)	Head of Guangdong Provincial Audit Office; 2008–2015	Succeeded by He Lijuan (何丽娟)
New title	Director of the Hainan Provincial Supervisory Commission; 2018–2021	Succeeded by Chen Guomeng
Preceded by Lin Wu	Governor of Shanxi; 2021–2022	Succeeded by Jin Xiangjun
Preceded by Liu Kun	Minister of Finance; 2023–present	Incumbent
Assembly seats
Preceded by Lin Wu	Chairperson of the Shanxi Provincial People's Congress; 2023	Succeeded by Tang Dengjie
