= Fang Wenping =

Chinese general

- 方文平

Commander of Shanxi Military District
- In office December 2005 – September 2010
- Preceded by: Zheng Chuanfu
- Succeeded by: Liu Yunhai

Personal details
- Born: October 1950 (age 75–76) Beijing, China
- Party: Chinese Communist Party
- Education: Central Party School of the Chinese Communist Party

Military service
- Allegiance: People's Republic of China
- Branch/service: People's Liberation Army Ground Force
- Rank: Major general

Fang Wenping (Chinese: 方文平; pinyin: Fāng Wénpíng; born October 1950) is a general in the People's Liberation Army of China. Fang obtained the rank of major general in 2002. He was investigated by the PLA's anti-graft agency in March 2014. Previously he served as Commander of Shanxi Military District and a Standing Committee of the CCP Shanxi Provincial Committee.

== Life and career ==
Fang was born and raised in Beijing, capital of China. He began his political career in February 1968, and joined the Chinese Communist Party in March 1970. He served in various posts in the 27th Army and over a period of six years worked his way up to the position of Head of the Rear-service Department. In 2000, he was appointed Chief of Staff of Hebei Military District, he remained in that position until 2005, when he was transferred to Shanxi and appointed Commander of Shanxi Military District, a year later, he concurrently served as a Standing Committee of the CCP Shanxi Provincial Committee. In March 2014, he was placed under investigation by the PLA's anti-corruption agency. In May 2014, he was transferred to judicial organs.

Military offices
Preceded by Zheng Chuanfu (郑传福)	Commander of Shanxi Military District; 2005–2010	Succeeded by Liu Yunhai (刘云海)
