= Ruan Posheng =

Chinese politician

Ruan Posheng (Chinese: 阮泊生) (June 6, 1916 – February 2, 2017) was a Chinese politician. He was born in Yu County, Hebei. He was the 1st Chairman of the Shanxi People's Congress. He was a delegate to the 5th National People's Congress and 6th National People's Congress.

Preceded by New office	Chairman of the Shanxi People's Congress; 1979–1988	Succeeded by Wang Tingdong
