= Feng Lixiang =

Chinese politician from Shanxi province

- 丰立祥

Communist Party Secretary of Datong
- In office February 2008 – October 2014
- Preceded by: Guo Liangxiao
- Succeeded by: Zhang Jifu

Mayor of Datong
- In office March 2006 – February 2008
- Preceded by: Guo Liangxiao
- Succeeded by: Geng Yanbo

Personal details
- Born: August 1957 (age 69) Shanyin County, Shanxi, China
- Party: Chinese Communist Party (1976–2015; expelled)
- Education: Taiyuan University of Technology; University of Science and Technology Beijing; Nanjing University of Aeronautics and Astronautics

Feng Lixiang (simplified Chinese: 丰立祥; traditional Chinese: 豐立祥; pinyin: Fēng Lìxiáng; born August 1957) is a Chinese politician from Shanxi who served as the Communist Party Secretary of Datong from 2008 to 2014. In 2014, he was investigated for corruption, expelled from the Communist Party, and indicted on bribery charges.

== Early life and education ==
Feng was born and raised in Shanyin County, Shanxi. In December 1974, at age 17, he became a sent-down youth during the Cultural Revolution. Feng joined the Chinese Communist Party in September 1976, around the time of Mao's death.

After the resumption of National College Entrance Examination, he entered the Taiyuan University of Technology, majoring in mechanical engineering. After college, he was assigned to Shanxi Metallurgical Geological Exploration Company (山西省冶金地质勘探公司), one year later, he was transferred to the General Office of CPC Shanxi Provincial Committee as a secretary. He earned a M.E. degree from University of Science and Technology Beijing in 1995 and a Doctor of Management Science and Engineering degree from Nanjing University of Aeronautics and Astronautics in 2008.

== Career ==
From December 1988 to March 1996, he served in various political roles in the General Office of the Shanxi Provincial Government. He served as secretary general of Taiyuan Municipal Party Committee from March 1996 to August 2001, then he was promoted to deputy party chief of Taiyuan.

Feng served as deputy party chief of Datong from February 2006 to February 2008, and the party chief, the top political position in the city, from February 2008 to October 2014. He concurrently served as mayor of Datong from March 2006 to February 2008.

== Downfall ==
On October 15, 2014, it was announced that Feng was being investigated by the Central Commission for Discipline Inspection of the Chinese Communist Party for "serious violations of laws and regulations". Feng was the first prefecture-level "first-in-charge" (i.e. party chief) to be investigated for corruption in Shanxi province after the 18th Party Congress. Following his dismissal, several of his subordinates, including the party chiefs of the Yanggao, Tianzhen and Zuoyun counties, were rounded up for investigation as well, showing the 'depth' of corruption in the city. In November 2014, Feng was indicted on charges of giving and accepting bribes by the Tianjin People's Procuratorate, and arrested.

After his dismissal, Datong did not have a party chief until August 2015, when Beijing official Zhang Jifu was 'parachuted' into the city to take charge. On August 7, Feng was expelled from the Chinese Communist Party (CCP) and dismissed from public office. His suspected crimes will also be transferred to the procuratorate for further investigation and prosecution.

On October 12, 2016, he was sentenced to 20 years and fined 2 million yuan for taking bribes, offering bribes and huge amount of property with unknown sources.

Party political offices
Preceded by Guo Liangxiao (郭良孝)	Communist Party Secretary of Datong; 2008–2014	Succeeded by Zhang Jifu (张吉福)
Government offices
Preceded by Guo Liangxiao (郭良孝)	Mayor of Datong; 2006–2008	Succeeded by Geng Yanbo (耿彦波)
