= Tianjin Garrison Command =

- 中国人民解放军天津警备区
- Founded: February 1949; 76 years ago
- Country: People's Republic of China
- Allegiance: Chinese Communist Party
- Type: Garrison command
- Role: Command and control
- Part of: People's Liberation Army
- Headquarters: Tianjin

Commanders
- Commander: Major general (shaojiang) Bai Zhongbin
- Political Commisar: Major general (shaojiang) Qiu Huolin

Chinese name
- Simplified Chinese: 中国人民解放军天津警备区
- Traditional Chinese: 中國人民解放軍天津警備區
Transcriptions
Standard Mandarin
- Hanyu Pinyin: Zhōngguó Rénmín Jiěfàngjūn Tiānjīn Jǐngbèiqū

The Tianjin Garrison Command (Chinese: 中国人民解放军天津警备区; full name People's Liberation Army Tianjin Garrison Command or PLA Tianjin Garrison Command) is a military district of the National Defense Mobilization Department of the Central Military Commission in China.

== History ==
The Tianjin Garrison Command dates back to February 1949. In January 1959, the former Tianjin Military Service Bureau (天津市兵役局), Tianjin Military Subdistrict (天津军分区), and the former Security Department of Tianjin Garrison Command (天津警备区警备科) were merged to form the Tianjin Garrison Command.

== Leaders ==
=== Commanders ===
Name (English)	Name (Chinese)	Tenure begins	Tenure ends	Ref.
Xiao Jingguang	萧劲光	February 1949	August 1950	
Qi Yuanwo	漆远渥	August 1950	June 1951	
Xiao Xinhuai	萧新槐	June 1951	December 1954	
Du Wenda	杜文达	March 1955	January 1959	
Fang Zhizhong	方之中	June 1959	February 1965	
Zhu Biao	朱彪	February 1952	February 1967	
Zheng Sansheng	郑三生	February 1967	June 1969	
Wang Yi	王一	June 1969	November 1978	
Cao Xikang	曹西康	April 1979	March 1983	
Wu Zhen	吴震	March 1983	July 1985	
Zheng Guozhong	郑国忠	July 1985	June 1990	
Yang Zhihua	杨志华	June 1990	April 1994	
Jin Renxie	金仁燮	April 1994	March 1998	
Huai Binglai	滑兵来	June 1998	June 2003	
Duan Duanwu	段端武	June 2003	January 2006	
Wang Xiaojing	王小京	January 2006	December 2009	
Dong Zeping	董泽平	December 2009	July 2014	
Yao Xiaoxuan	姚小旋	July 2014	December 2020	
Ding Xiangrong	丁向荣	December 2020	22 February 2022	
Bai Zhongbin	白忠斌	22 February 2022		

=== Political commissars ===
Name (English)	Name (Chinese)	Tenure begins	Tenure ends	Ref.
Huang Kecheng	黄克诚	February 1949	June 1949	
Huang Jing	黄敬	June 1949	August 1952	
Zhang Liankui	张连奎	August 1952	August 1953	
Xiao Siming	萧思明	August 1953	June 1958	
Wan Xiaotang	万晓塘	June 1958	September 1966	
Xie Xuegong	解学恭	October 1969	June 1978	
Lin Hujia	林乎加	June 1978	October 1978	
Chen Weida	陈伟达	October 1978	October 1984	
Song Zhenchun	宋振春	April 1983	July 1985	
Ni Zhifu	倪志福	October 1984	August 1987	
Lan Baojing	兰保景	July 1985	June 1990	
Chen Deyi	陈德毅	June 1990	February 1993	
Yang Huichuan	杨惠川	February 1993	November 1994	
Xu Ziqiang	徐自强	January 1995	July 1995	
Kou Xianxiang	寇宪祥	November 1995	July 1996	
Gao Yunjiang	高云江	July 1996	September 1999	
Chen Jinbiao	陈锦彪	September 1999	November 2001	
Liu Shucai	刘书才	November 2001	February 2004	
Ren Zhitong	任之通	February 2004	December 2007	
Xie Jianhua	谢建华	December 2007	January 2012	
Liao Keduo	廖可铎	February 2012	January 2016	
Li Jun	李军	June 2018	January 2024	
Qiu Huolin	邱火林	2024		
