= Governor of Shanxi =

Governor of the Shanxi Provincial People's Government
- 山西省人民政府省长
- National Emblem of China

- Flag of China
- Incumbent; Lu Dongliang since 3 June 2025
- Shanxi Provincial People's Government
- Type: Governor
- Status: Provincial and ministerial-level official
- Reports to: Shanxi Provincial People's Congress and its Standing Committee
- Nominator: Presidium of the Shanxi Provincial People's Congress
- Appointer: Shanxi Provincial People's Congress
- Term length: Five years, renewable
- Inaugural holder: Cheng Zihua
- Formation: August 1949
- Deputy: Deputy Governors; Secretary-General

The governor of Shanxi, officially the Governor of the Shanxi Provincial People's Government, is the head of Shanxi Province and leader of the Shanxi Provincial People's Government.

The governor is elected by the Shanxi Provincial People's Congress, and responsible to it and its Standing Committee. The governor is a provincial level official and is responsible for the overall decision-making of the provincial government. The governor is assisted by an executive vice governor as well as several vice governors. The governor generally serves as the deputy secretary of the Shanxi Provincial Committee of the Chinese Communist Party and as a member of the CCP Central Committee. The governor is the second highest-ranking official in the province after the secretary of the CCP Shanxi Committee. The current governor is Lu Dongliang, who took office on 3 June 2025.

== List of governors ==
=== People's Republic of China ===
No.	Officeholder	Term of office		Party	Ref.
No.	Officeholder	Took office	Left office	Party	Ref.
Governor of the Shanxi Provincial People's Government
1	Cheng Zihua (1905–1991)	August 1949	February 1951	Chinese Communist Party	
2	Lai Ruoyu (1910–1958)	February 1951	May 1952	Chinese Communist Party	
3	Pei Lisheng (1906–2000)	May 1952	February 1955	Chinese Communist Party	
Governor of the Shanxi Provincial People's Committee
(3)	Pei Lisheng (1906–2000)	February 1955	April 1956	Chinese Communist Party	
4	Wang Shiying (1905–1968)	April 1956	November 1958	Chinese Communist Party	
5	Wei Heng (1915–1967)	November 1958	December 1965	Chinese Communist Party	
6	Wang Qian (1917–2007)	December 1965	January 1967	Chinese Communist Party	
Director of the Shanxi Revolutionary Committee
7	Liu Geping (1904–1992)	January 1967	April 1971	Chinese Communist Party	
8	Xie Zhenhua (1916–2011)	April 1971	May 1975	Chinese Communist Party	
9	Wang Qian (1917–2007)	May 1975	December 1979	Chinese Communist Party	
Governor of the Shanxi Provincial People's Government
10	Luo Guibo (1907–1995)	December 1979	April 1983	Chinese Communist Party	
11	Wang Senhao (1933–2022)	April 1983	July 1992	Chinese Communist Party	
12	Hu Fuguo (born 1937)	23 July 1992	20 September 1993	Chinese Communist Party	
13	Sun Wensheng (born 1942)	September 1993	July 1999	Chinese Communist Party	
14	Liu Zhenhua (born 1940)	July 1999	January 2004	Chinese Communist Party	
15	Zhang Baoshun (born 1950)	19 February 2004	9 July 2005	Chinese Communist Party	
16	Yu Youjun (born 1953)	9 July 2005	3 September 2007	Chinese Communist Party	
17	Meng Xuenong (born 1949)	3 September 2007	14 September 2008	Chinese Communist Party	
18	Wang Jun (born 1952)	14 September 2008	19 December 2012	Chinese Communist Party	
19	Li Xiaopeng (born 1959)	29 January 2013	30 August 2016	Chinese Communist Party	
20	Lou Yangsheng (born 1959)	30 August 2016	5 December 2019	Chinese Communist Party	
21	Lin Wu (born 1962)	5 December 2019	4 June 2021	Chinese Communist Party	
22	Lan Fo'an (born 1962)	4 June 2021	29 December 2022	Chinese Communist Party	
23	Jin Xiangjun (born 1964)	29 December 2022	23 April 2025 (Note: Suspended since 12 April 2025. Resignation accepted by Standing Committee of Shanxi Provincial People's Congress on 23 April 2025)	Chinese Communist Party	
—	Vacant (Note: Executive Vice Governor Lu Dongliang presided over government work since 12 April 2025)				
24	Lu Dongliang (born 1973)	3 June 2025	Incumbent	Chinese Communist Party	
