= Zhang Chunlin =

Chinese politician (born 1965)

- 张春林

Chairperson of the Shanxi Provincial Committee of the Chinese People's Political Consultative Conference
- Incumbent
- Assumed office January 2025
- Preceded by: Wu Cunrong

Personal details
- Born: February 1965 (age 61) Deyang County, Sichuan, China
- Party: Chinese Communist Party
- Education: Bayi Agricultural College; Xinjiang University

Chinese name
- Simplified Chinese: 张春林
- Traditional Chinese: 張春林
Transcriptions
Standard Mandarin
- Hanyu Pinyin: Zhāng Chūnlín

Zhang Chunlin (Chinese: 张春林; born February 1965) is a Chinese politician, currently serving as chairperson of the Shanxi Provincial Committee of the Chinese People's Political Consultative Conference.

Zhang is an alternate of the 20th Central Committee of the Chinese Communist Party. He is a representative of the 20th National Congress of the Chinese Communist Party.

== Early life and education ==
Zhang was born in Deyang County (now Deyang), Sichuan, in February 1965. In 1982, he enrolled at Bayi Agricultural College in Xinjiang, where he majored in agricultural mechanization. Zhang joined the Chinese Communist Party (CCP) in January 1986 upon graduation.

== Career ==
=== Xinjiang ===
After graduation in 1986, Zhang became an official in the Office of the CCP Tacheng Municipal Committee. He stayed at the CCP Tacheng Municipal Committee for 14 years, interspersed with short stays as deputy party secretary of Shawan County from July 1994 to January 1998.

Zhang was made director of the Xinjiang Uygur Autonomous Regional Township Enterprise Management Bureau in December 2000, and served until June 2006, when he was appointed executive vice governor of the Bortala Mongol Autonomous Prefecture. He was appointed deputy party branch secretary of the Xinjiang Uygur Autonomous Regional Audit Office in January 2011, concurrently serving as director since next month. He was deputy party branch secretary and director of the Xinjiang Uygur Autonomous Regional Development and Reform Commission in March 2013, in addition to serving as director of the Office of the Coordination Leading Group for Xinjiang Uyghur Autonomous Region's Assistance to Xinjiang and vice chairman of the Xinjiang Uygur Autonomous Regional People's Government. He was promoted to executive vice chairman of the Xinjiang Uygur Autonomous Regional People's Government in January 2018 and was admitted to standing committee member of the CCP Xinjiang Uygur Autonomous Regional Committee, the region's top authority. He was chosen as deputy party secretary of Xinjiang in April 2021, concurrently holding the head of the Publicity Department of the CCP Xinjiang Uygur Autonomous Regional Committee position.

=== Shanxi ===
In November 2023, Zhang was transferred to north China's Shanxi province and appointed specifically designated deputy party secretary. In January 2025, he took up the post of chairperson of the Shanxi Provincial Committee of the Chinese People's Political Consultative Conference, the provincial advisory body.

Government offices
Preceded by Liu Yanliang	Director of the Xinjiang Uygur Autonomous Regional Development and Reform Commission; 2013–2018	Succeeded by Xu Bin
Preceded by Tian Wen	Vice Chairman of the Xinjiang Uygur Autonomous Regional People's Government; 2017–2018	Succeeded by Qadirbek Qamza
Preceded by Peng Jiarui	Executive Vice Chairman of the Xinjiang Uygur Autonomous Regional People's Government; 2018–2021	Succeeded by Chen Weijun
Party political offices
Preceded by Tian Wen	Head of the Publicity Department of Xinjiang Uygur Autonomous Regional Committee of the Chinese Communist Party; 2021–2022	Succeeded by Wang Jianxin
Preceded by Shang Liguang	Specifically-designated Deputy Communist Party Secretary of Shanxi; 2023–2025	Succeeded by TBA
Assembly seats
Preceded by Wu Cunrong	Chairperson of the Shanxi Provincial Committee of the Chinese People's Political Consultative Conference; 2025–present	Incumbent
