= Chen Deyi =

Chinese military officer

- 陈德毅

Political Commissar of the PLA Shanxi Military District
- In office April 1994 – December 2000
- Commander: Dong Yunhai; Liu Yinchao
- Preceded by: Zhang Zhen
- Succeeded by: Gui Wanzeng

Political Commissar of the PLA Tianjing Garrison Command
- In office June 1990 – February 1993
- Commander: Yang Zhihua (杨志华)
- Preceded by: Lan Baojing
- Succeeded by: Yang Huichuan

Personal details
- Born: 24 October 1943 (age 82) Suzhou, Jiangsu, China
- Party: Chinese Communist Party
- Education: PLA Beijing Political College; PLA National Defence University

Military service
- Allegiance: People's Republic of China
- Branch/service: People's Liberation Army Ground Force
- Years of service: 1961–2000
- Rank: Major general

Chinese name
- Simplified Chinese: 陈德毅
- Traditional Chinese: 陳德毅
Transcriptions
Standard Mandarin
- Hanyu Pinyin: Chén Déyì

Chen Deyi (Chinese: 陈德毅; born 24 October 1943) is a major general in the People's Liberation Army of China who served as political commissar of the PLA Tianjing Garrison Command from 1990 to 1993 and political commissar of the PLA Shanxi Military District from 1994 to 2000. He was a representative of the 14th and 15th National Congress of the Chinese Communist Party.

== Biography ==
Chen was born in Suzhou, Jiangsu, on 24 October 1943, while his ancestral home in the town of Qingyang, Jiangyin. He enlisted in the People's Liberation Army (PLA) in 1961, and joined the Chinese Communist Party (CCP) in July 1964. He enrolled at the PLA Beijing Political College in October 1980 and later studied at the PLA National Defence University in 1993. In June 1990, he was commissioned as political commissar of the PLA Tianjing Garrison Command, he remained in that position until February 1993, when he was transferred to the neighboring Shanxi province and appointed political commissar of the PLA Shanxi Military District.

Military offices
Preceded by Lan Baojing	Political Commissar of the PLA Tianjing Garrison Command; 1990–1993	Succeeded by Yang Huichuan
Preceded by Zhang Zhen	Political Commissar of the PLA Shanxi Military District; 1994–2000	Succeeded by Gui Wanzeng
