= Shang Liguang =

Chinese politician

- 商黎光

Specifically-designated Deputy Communist Party Secretary of Shanxi
- In office November 2021 – September 2023
- Party Secretary: Lan Fo'an
- Preceded by: Lan Fo'an
- Succeeded by: Zhang Chunlin

Personal details
- Born: November 1963 (age 62) Julu County, Hebei, China
- Party: Chinese Communist Party (1984–2024; expelled)
- Education: Xingtai Finance and Trade School; Inner Mongolia Normal University; Nanyang Technological University; Central Party School of the Chinese Communist Party

Shang Liguang (Chinese: 商黎光; pinyin: Shāng Líguāng; born November 1963) is a former Chinese politician who spent most of his career in north China's Shanxi province. He entered the workforce in September 1981, and joined the Chinese Communist Party (CCP) in June 1984. He was investigated by China's top anti-graft agency in September 2023. Previously he served as Specifically designated Deputy Communist Party Secretary of Shanxi.

He was a representative of the 19th and 20th National Congress of the Chinese Communist Party.

== Early life and education ==
Shang was born in Julu County, Hebei, in November 1963.

== Career ==
After graduating from Xingtai Finance and Trade School in 1981, he was assigned as a statistician at the Bureau of Statistics of Pingxiang County, and rose to deputy director in March 1984.

He was transferred to Xingtai Municipal Commission for Discipline Inspection in October 1987, and three years later was transferred again to Hebei Provincial Commission for Discipline Inspection. He moved up the ranks to become secretary-general in October 2003 and executive deputy party secretary in November 2010.

In March 2013, he was named acting mayor of Qinhuangdao, confirmed in the following month. He was chosen as party secretary of Cangzhou, the top political position in the city, in September 2014.

In November 2016, he was appointed secretary-general and was also admitted to member of the CCP Hebei Provincial Committee, the province's top authority. He was made secretary of the Political and Legal Affairs Commission in June 2017, in addition to serving as Specifically designated Deputy Communist Party Secretary of Shanxi since October 2021.

== Downfall ==
On 5 September 2023, he has been placed under investigation for "serious violations of laws and regulations" by the Central Commission for Discipline Inspection (CCDI), the party's internal disciplinary body, and the National Supervisory Commission, the highest anti-corruption agency of China.

On 24 February 2024, Shang expelled from the CCP and removed from public office. On March 20, the Supreme People's Procuratorate signed an arrest order for Shang for taking bribes. In July, his trial was held at the Intermediate People's Court of Luoyang in Henan province, according to the indictment, he used his various positions between 1999 and 2023 to help others in various matters, such as business operation, project contracting, case handling and work promotions as well as accepting bribes worth more than 104 million yuan ($14.62 million) directly or through his relatives. On December 27, he was sentenced to life imprisonment for accepting bribes. He was deprived of political rights for life and all his properties were also confiscated.

Government offices
Preceded by Zhu Haowen	Mayor of Qinhuangdao; 2013–2014	Succeeded by Zhang Ruishu
Party political offices
Preceded by Jiao Yanlong	Communist Party Secretary of Cangzhou; 2014–2016	Succeeded by Yang Hui
Preceded by Fan Zhaobing	Secretary-general of Hebei Provincial Committee of the Chinese Communist Party; 2016–2017	Succeeded by Tong Jianming
Preceded by Huang Xiaowei	Secretary of the Political and Legal Affairs Commission of the Shanxi Provincial Committee of the Chinese Communist Party; 2017–2021	Succeeded by Zheng Liansheng
Preceded by Lan Fo'an	Specifically-designated Deputy Communist Party Secretary of Shanxi; 2021–2023	Succeeded by Zhang Chunlin
