= Xie Zhenhua =

Xie Zhenhua may refer to:

- Xie Zhenhua (general) (谢振华; 1916–2011), Chinese general
- Xie Zhenhua (politician) (解振华; born 1949), Chinese politician
