= Li Daqiu =

Chinese politician

- 李达球

Vice-Chairman of the Guangxi Regional Committee of the Chinese People's Political Consultative Conference
- In office January 2008 – July 2013
- Chairman: Ma Tieshan

Communist Party Secretary of Hezhou
- In office May 2003 – November 2006
- Preceded by: Huang Daowei
- Succeeded by: Zhao Leqin

Mayor of Yulin
- In office June 2001 – May 2003
- Preceded by: Fang Hao
- Succeeded by: Jin Xiangjun

Personal details
- Born: October 1953 (age 72–73) Zhaoping County, Guangxi, China
- Party: Chinese Communist Party (1973–2013, expelled)
- Education: Central Party School of the Chinese Communist Party; Zhongnan University of Economics and Law

Li Daqiu (simplified Chinese: 李达球; traditional Chinese: 李達球; pinyin: Lǐ Dáqiú; born October 1953) a former politician in the Guangxi Zhuang Autonomous Region of China. Li served as the Party Secretary of Hezhou, and the Mayor of Yulin, both cities in Guangxi. He was removed from his posts and expelled from the Communist Party in 2013 and subsequently tried on charges of corruption. In October 2014, Li was convicted of taking bribes of 10.95 million Yuan (~$1.8 million) between 2003 and 2013, and sentenced to fifteen years in prison.

== Career ==
Li was born in Zhaoping County, Guangxi in October 1953.

Li joined the Chinese Communist Party in October 1973 and he got involved in politics in October 1974.

During the Cultural Revolution, Li worked in Zhaoping County as a local officer. He rose through the ranks to become the Vice-Governor of Zhaoping County in November 1987, then he was elevated to the County Governor and the CCP County Committee Vice-Secretary of Zhaoping.

In September 1993 he became the CCP County Committee Secretary of He County, a position he held until April 1996.

Li entered Central Party School of the Chinese Communist Party in August 1995, majoring in economic administration, where he graduated in 1999. After graduation, he was educated in Zhongnan University of Economics and Law.

In June 2001, he was appointed the Mayor of the city of Yulin, Guangxi and the Party Vice-Secretary of Yulin, he remained in that position until May 2003, when he was transferred to Hezhou and appointed the Party Secretary of Hezhou.

In January 2008, Li was elevated to the vice-chairman of the Guangxi Committee of the Chinese People's Political Consultative Conference.

== Downfall ==
On July 6, 2013, state media announced that Li was being investigated by the Central Commission for Discipline Inspection for "serious violations of laws and regulations". On July 13, Li was dismissed from his position. In September 2013, Li was expelled from the Chinese Communist Party and removed from his government posts.

On August 28, 2014, Li's case was brought before the intermediate court of the Yanbian Korean Autonomous Prefecture in Jilin province for trial. The prefecture's prosecutor agency alleged that Li took 10.95 million Yuan (~$1.8 million) in bribes during his time as Hezhou party chief and vice-chairman of the Guangxi Committee of the Chinese People's Political Consultative Conference, in the process of government business dealings as well as in the arrangement of promotions for officials. On October 13, Li was sentenced to fifteen years in prison.

Li is the highest-ranked official to be convicted of corruption charges in Guangxi since the 18th Party Congress. His downfall has earned him the moniker "Guangxi tiger" (桂老虎), in reference to Xi Jinping's anti-corruption programme that vowed to take down "tigers" (high-level officials) and "flies" (petty officials).

Government offices
Preceded by Fang Hao	Mayor of Yulin; 2001–2003	Succeeded by Jin Xiangjun
Party political offices
Preceded by Huang Daowei	Communist Party Secretary of Hezhou; 2003–2006	Succeeded by Zhao Leqin
