= Lin Wu =

Chinese politician (born 1962)

- 林武

Party Secretary of Shandong
- Incumbent
- Assumed office 29 December 2022
- Deputy: Zhou Naixiang (Governor)
- Preceded by: Li Ganjie

Party Secretary of Shanxi
- In office 1 June 2021 – 29 December 2022
- Deputy: Lan Fo'an (Governor)
- Secretary: Lou Yangsheng
- Preceded by: Lou Yangsheng
- Succeeded by: Lan Fo'an (Governor)

Governor of Shanxi
- In office 5 December 2019 – 4 June 2021
- Preceded by: Lou Yangsheng
- Succeeded by: Lan Fo'an

Personal details
- Born: February 1962 (age 64) Minhou County, Fujian
- Party: Chinese Communist Party (1987-)
- Education: Jiangxi University of Science and Technology

Lin Wu (Chinese: 林武; pinyin: Lín Wǔ; born February 1962) is a Chinese politician and the current Chinese Communist Party Committee Secretary of Shandong province. Previously, he served as CCP Committee Secretary of Shanxi province, Shanxi Governor, deputy governor and the chief of the CCP Organization Department of Jilin province.

== Career ==
Lin Wu was born in Minhou County, Fujian, and graduated from Jiangxi Institute of Metallurgy (now Jiangxi University of Science and Technology). He started to work at Xiangtan Steel in 1982, and served as the Assistant manager in 1997. In 1998, he served as the General Manager of Xiangtan Steel Group.

In 2003, Lin Wu was appointed as the director of Hunan Economic and Trade Commission. Later he was appointed as the acting mayor of Loudi City in 2005, and promoted to the CCP Committee Secretary in 2008.

In 2011, Lin was appointed as the deputy chief of the CCP Organization Department of Hunan province. He was transferred to Jilin province, and served as the chief of the CCP Organization Department in 2016. In 2017, he was appointed as the deputy Governor of Jilin.

Lin resigned as the deputy Governor of Jilin in 2018, and was appointed as the deputy Governor of Shanxi. In December 2019, he was appointed as the acting Governor.

In June 2021, Lin was appointed as the CCP Committee Secretary of Shanxi.

In December 2022, Lin was appointed as the CCP Committee Secretary of Shandong.

Party political offices
Preceded by Cai Lifeng	Party Secretary of Loudi; 2008–2011	Succeeded by Gong Wusheng
Preceded by Zhang Wenxiong	Secretary of the Working Committee of the Comprehensive Reform Pilot Zone for the Construction of "Two-Oriented Society" in Changsha, Zhuzhou and Xiangtan; 2015–2016	Succeeded by Vacant
Preceded by Qi Yu	Head of the Organization Department of Jilin Provincial Committee of the Chinese Communist Party; 2016–2017	Succeeded by Wang Kai
Preceded by Huang Xiaowei	Specifically-designated Deputy Party Secretary of Shanxi; 2019	Succeeded by Lan Fo'an
Preceded by Lou Yangsheng	Party Secretary of Shanxi; 2021–2022	Succeeded by Lan Fo'an
Preceded by Li Ganjie	Party Secretary of Shandong; 2022–present	Incumbent
Party political offices
Preceded by Chen Dequan (陈德铨)	Director of the Hunan Provincial Economic and Trade Commission; 2003–2004	Succeeded by Position revoked
New title	Director of the Hunan Provincial Economic Commission; 2004–2005	Succeeded by Hu Henghua
Preceded by Liu Yunzhu (刘云柱)	Mayor of Loudi; 2005–2006	Succeeded by Zhang Shuofu
Preceded by Gao Guangbin	Executive Vice Governor of Jilin; 2017–2018	Succeeded by Wu Jingping
Preceded by Gao Jianmin	Executive Vice Governor of Shanxi; 2018–2019	Succeeded by Hu Yuting
Preceded by Lou Yangsheng	Governor of Shanxi; 2019–2021	Succeeded by Lan Fo'an
