= Jianhua Lu =

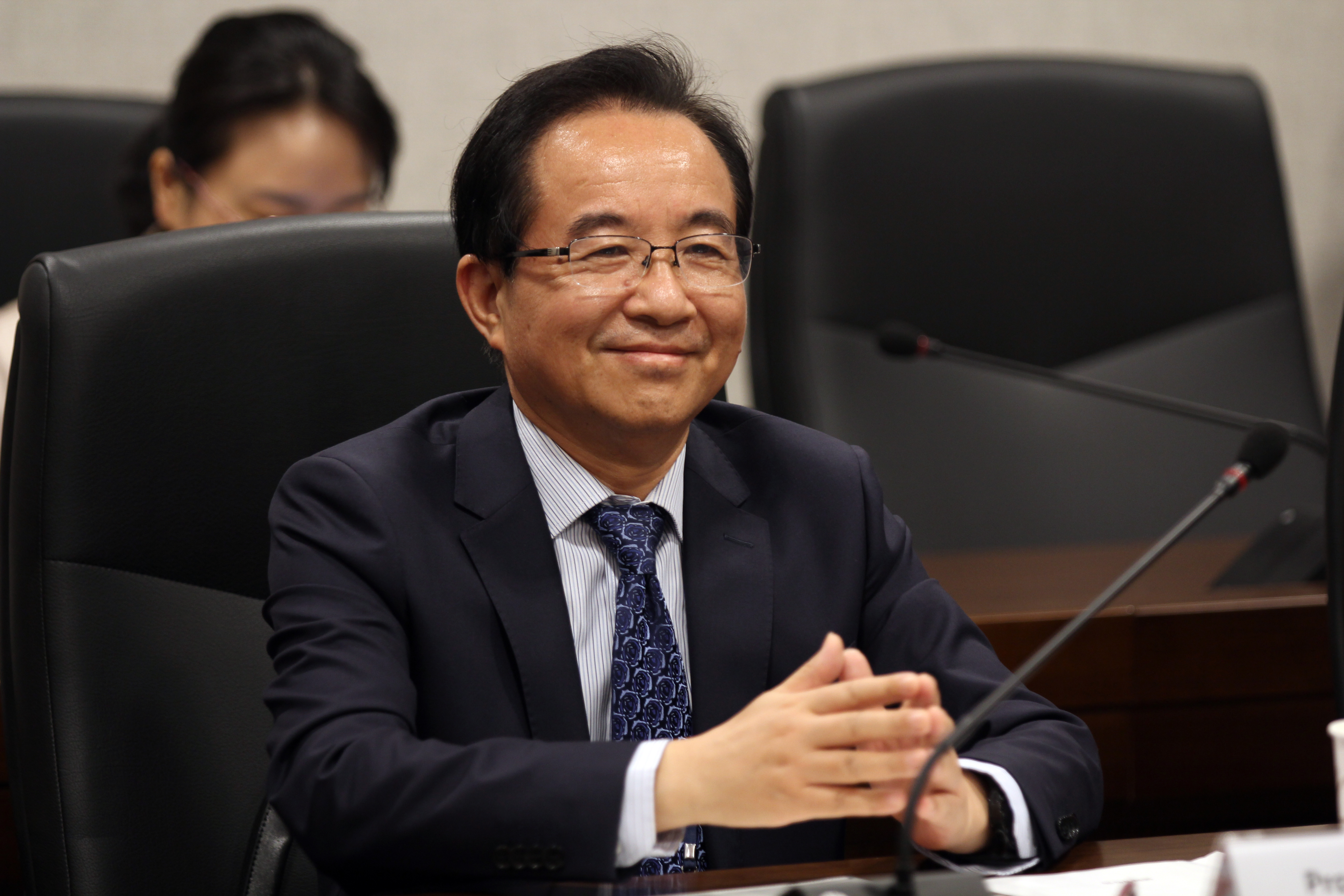

Jianhua Lu is a professor at the Department of Electronics Engineering, Tsinghua University, Beijing, China. His expertise is related to telecommunications. He was elected as an academician of the Chinese Academy of Sciences, elected in 2015. That same year, he was named Fellow of the Institute of Electrical and Electronics Engineers (IEEE) for his contributions to the theory and engineering applications of wireless transmission technologies. He was recognized in China for making important contributions to satellite communications.
