= Li Xiuren =

Chinese politician

Li Xiuren (Chinese: 李修仁) (1921 – 1 February 2016) was a Chinese politician. He was born in Zuoquan County, Shanxi. He was Chinese Communist Party Committee Secretary of Taiyuan (1982–1983) and CPPCC Committee Chairman (1985–1993) of his home province. He was a delegate to the 6th National People's Congress (1983–1988).

Preceded by Wu Guangtang	CPPCC Committee Chairman of Shanxi; 1985–1993	Succeeded by Wang Maolin
