= On Practice =

1937 philosophical work by Mao Zedong

On Practice (simplified Chinese: 实践论; traditional Chinese: 實踐論; pinyin: Shíjiànlùn) is one of Mao Zedong's most important philosophical works. Along with On Contradiction, this essay is a part of lectures Mao gave in 1937. It expresses Mao's support for Marxism and attempts to establish a distinctly Chinese brand of communist philosophy. On Practice argues that people must apply knowledge to practice in reality in order to test its truthfulness. At the time it was written, the Chinese Communist Party (CCP) had just endured the Long March and their nationalist foes were still at large. Plus, China was facing a tremendous Japanese threat. Mao hoped to establish himself as the leader of the CCP in order to unite China and vanquish the Japanese. On Practice was written as a part of this mission, for it gave Mao a more legitimate claim to lead by creating the basis for his communist philosophy, Maoism.

== Philosophical argument ==
On Practice expands on Mao's criticism of dogmatism in his 1930 essay, Oppose Book Worship. The text begins with Mao's emphasis on practice over theory, and states, "Marxists hold that man's social practice alone is the criterion of the truth of his knowledge of the external world." The text defines "social practice" as "material production, class struggle, or scientific experiment." In this view, a person must "discover the truth through practice, and again through practice verify and develop the truth."

According to On Practice:

If people want to succeed (that is, achieve anticipated results), they must bring their ideas into correspondence with the laws of the objective external world; if these do not correspond, people will fail in their practice. After they fail, they draw a lesson from their failure, correct their ideas to make them correspond to the laws of the objective world, and can thus turn a failure into success; this is what is meant by "failure is the mother of success" and "a fall into the pit, a gain in your wit."

On Practice states that the masses, as owners of the means of production, should engage in material production. According to the text, "man's knowledge depends mainly on his activity in human production". Through participation in material production, people develop their understanding of class relationships, social relations, and human relationships. Thus, according to Mao, practical participation in social environments or production are the only reliable mechanism for developing useful knowledge.

The text states that knowledge begins with perceptual knowledge rooted in experience. A person has to perceive physical things before understanding their "essence and internal relations". A person must then synthesize "the data of perception by arranging and reconstructing them." A dialectical process thus leads from perceptual knowledge to rational knowledge. After rational knowledge comes a "leap" to "revolutionary practice," in which theory is deployed back into the world of practice.

== Influence ==
On Practice, along with Mao's On Contradiction, elevated his reputation as a Marxist theoretician. Both works became widely read in the USSR after Mao was celebrated in the Eastern Bloc for China's intervention in the Korean War.

On Practice laid the theoretical foundation for Mao's subsequent slogan, "seek truth from facts." The primacy of practice discussed in the text serves as the theoretical basis for the mass line, a practice summarized by the slogan, "from the masses, to the masses." Expressions used in the text like "failure is the mother of success" and "practice is the sole criterion of truth" became widespread.

The text's discussion of knowledge production informed approaches to arts and science throughout the Mao era.

In April 1960, Petroleum Minister Yu Qiuli stated that On Practice (along with On Contradiction) would be the ideological core of the campaign to develop the Daqing oil field in northeast China. Yu's efforts to mobilize workers in Daqing focused on ideological motivation rather than material incentives. The Ministry of the Petroleum Industry shipped thousands of copies by plane so that every Daqing oil worker would have copies and for work units to each set up their own study groups. The successful completion of Daqing despite harsh weather conditions and supply limitations became a model held up by the CCP as an example during subsequent industrialization campaigns.

== Writing ==
Like On Contradiction, On Practice was written by Mao during the Yan'an Period. On Practice was first delivered as a speech in July 1937.
