= Yang Jianhua =

Chinese archaeologist (born 1955)

- 杨建华
- Born: 1955 (age 70–71); Changchun, China
- Education: Jilin University
- Known for: Scholar of Mesopotamian archaeology, Northern Zone archaeology
- Scientific career
- Fields: Archaeology
- Workplaces: Jilin University; Cambridge University; University of Pittsburgh
- Thesis: The Formation of the Northern China Cultural Belt in the Spring and Autumn to Warring States Period (2001)
- Doctoral advisor: Lin Yun

Yang Jianhua (Note: In this Chinese name, the family name is Yang.) (born 1955) is a Chinese archaeologist. She held the position of Professor of Archaeology at Jilin University from 1996 and is known as one of the first Mainland Chinese scholars to research world archaeology, including Mesopotamia and Siberia.

== Education ==
Yang completed her undergraduate degree in archaeology at Jilin University in 1978 after which she remained at the university to teach. She completed her PhD in 2001 on the transformation from an agricultural to nomadic pastoralist economy in China's Northern Zone during the mid- to late 1st millennium BCE. While earlier studies referred to this period generically as Eastern Zhou, Yang created a detailed periodisation for the different regions spanning Hebei, Inner Mongolia, Gansu, and Ningxia provinces. Her thesis was published in 2004.

== Career ==
After completing her undergraduate degree in 1978, Yang taught archaeology at Jilin University. She became associate professor in 1991 and full professor in 1996. Yang was a visiting scholar at the University of Cambridge in 1993 and 2002, as well as at the University of Pittsburgh in 2007.

In 2018, Yang and co-authors Shao Huiqiu and Pan Ling received the Golden Tripod Award of the Society for Chinese Archaeology for their book The Metal Road of the Eastern Eurasian Steppe. The English translation was published in 2020.

Yang was a member of the State Council's 7th Academic Consultative Committee (Chinese: 国务院第七届学科评议组) for archaeology. She has been a committee member for the Research Centre for Foreign Archaeology of the Chinese Academy of Social Sciences since 2017.</ref=shao>

== Selected publications ==
=== Chinese ===
- Yang Jianhua (1999). 外国考古学史 [A history of foreign archaeology] (in Chinese). Changchun: Jilin University Press. ISBN 9787560117492.
- Yang Jianhua (2004). 春秋战国时期中国北方文化带的形成 [The formation of the Northern China cultural belt in the Spring and Autumn to Warring States period] (in Chinese). Beijing: Wenwu chubanshe. ISBN 9787501016518.
- Yang Jianhua (2014). 两河流域：从农业村落走向城邦国家 [Mesopotamia: from village to city state] (in Chinese). Beijing: China Science Publishing & Media.
- Yang Jianhua; Shao Huiqiu; Pan Ling (2016). 欧亚草原东部的金属之路 [The metal road for the eastern Eurasian Steppe] (in Chinese). Shanghai: Shanghai guji chubanshe. ISBN 9787532579648.
- Yang Jianhua; Zhao Xinxin (2019). 内蒙古东周北方青铜器 [Northern bronzes of the Eastern Zhou from Inner Mongolia] (in Chinese). Shanghai: Shanghai guji chubanshe. ISBN 9787532590483.

=== English ===
- Jianhua Yang; Huiqiu Shao; Ling Pan (2020). The Metal Road of the Eastern Eurasian Steppe: The Formation of the Xiongnu Confederation and the Silk Road. Singapore: Springer. ISBN 9789813291577.
