= Liu Xiufeng =

Chinese politician

- 刘秀峰

Minister of Construction Engineering
- In office August 1954 – 5 August 1964
- Premier: Zhou Enlai
- Preceded by: Chen Zhengren
- Succeeded by: Li Renjun

Personal details
- Born: Liu Fachang (刘法常); 1909 Wan County, Zhili, Qing China
- Died: 1971 (aged 61–62) Beijing, China
- Party: Chinese Communist Party
- Education: Baoding Provincial Second Normal School

Chinese name
- Simplified Chinese: 刘秀峰
- Traditional Chinese: 劉秀峰
Transcriptions
Standard Mandarin
- Hanyu Pinyin: Liú Xiùfēng

Liu Fachang
- Simplified Chinese: 刘法常
- Traditional Chinese: 劉法常
Transcriptions
Standard Mandarin
- Hanyu Pinyin: Liú Fǎcháng

Aichuan
- Simplified Chinese: 爱川
- Traditional Chinese: 愛川
Transcriptions
Standard Mandarin
- Hanyu Pinyin: àichuān

Liu Xiufeng (Chinese: 刘秀峰; 1909 – 29 March 1971) was a Chinese politician who served as Minister of Construction Engineering from 1954 to 1964. He was a delegate to the 2nd National People's Congress. He was a member of the 2th National Committee of the Chinese People's Political Consultative Conference. He was a representative of the 8th National Congress of the Chinese Communist Party.

== Biography ==
Liu was born Liu Fachang (刘法常) in Wan County (now Shunping County), Zhili (now Hebei), in 1909, during the late Qing dynasty (1644–1911).

Liu joined the Communist Youth League of China in 1925 and the Chinese Communist Party (CCP) in 1926. On 19 September 1926, the CCP Baoding Municipal Committee was vandalized and Liu was unfortunately arrested; Due to multiple rescue efforts, he was released from prison 18 days later. He was secretary of the Workers' Movement Committee of the CCP Baoding Municipal Committee in 1927 and subsequently secretary of the CCP Wanman County Committee. In 1928, he was transferred to Tianjin, where he responsible for newspaper distribution and document storage in the CCP Shunzhi Provincial Committee. In May 1929, he was arrested again by the Kuomintang for betrayal and imprisoned in Tianjin No.3 Prison. After serving his sentence and being released from prison in 1935, he was appointed as head of Publicity Department of the CCP Baoding Special Committee. Shortly thereafter, he became acting secretary of the CCP Baoding Special Committee.

After the outbreak of the Second Sino-Japanese War in 1937, he successively served as head of the Organization Department of the CCP Pinghan Provincial Committee, head of the Propaganda Department of the CCP Shanxi-Chahar-Hebei Regional Committee, secretary of the CCP Zhangjiakou Municipal Committee, and political commissar of the Zhangjiakou Garrison Command. He participated in the organizational and leadership work of establishing, consolidating, and developing the Shanxi-Chahar-Hebei Counter-Japanese Base, and also took part in the Counter-Japanese Guerrilla War behind enemy lines in north China and the battle to recapture Zhangjiakou.

During the Chinese Civil War, he successively served as secretary of the CCP Zhangjiakou Municipal Committee, secretary of the CCP Central Hebei Regional Committee, and deputy political commissar of the Central Hebei Military Region. After the liberation of Shijiazhuang in November 1947, he was appointed secretary of the CCP Shijiazhuang Municipal Committee, concurrently serving as mayor of Shijiazhuang.

After the establishment of the People's Republic of China in 1949, he successively served as deputy secretary of the CCP Tianjin Municipal Committee, deputy mayor of Tianjin, head of the Organization Department of the CCP North China Bureau Committee, deputy secretary and director of Industry of the CCP North China Bureau Committee, and first vice chairman of the North China Administrative Committee. In August 1954, he was named acting minister of construction engineering, confirmed in the next month.

During the Cultural Revolution, Liu suffered political persecution. Liu died of an illness in Beijing on 29 March 1971.

Government offices
Preceded by Liu Kai	Mayor of Baoding; 1945	Succeeded by Li Zemin
Preceded by Ke Qingshi	Mayor of Shijiazhuang; 1949	Succeeded by Mao Duo
Preceded by Chen Zhengren	Minister of Construction Engineering; 1954–1964	Succeeded by Li Renjun
