= Shanxi Provincial Committee of the Chinese Communist Party =

Shanxi Provincial Committee of the Chinese Communist Party 中国共产党山西省委员会

Overview
- Type: Highest decision-making organ when Shanxi Provincial Congress is not in session.
- Elected by: Shanxi Provincial Congress
- Length of term: Five years
- Term limits: None
- First convocation: May 1927; 99 years ago
- Secretary: Tang Dengjie
- Executive organ: Standing Committee
- Inspection organ: Commission for Discipline Inspection

Meeting place
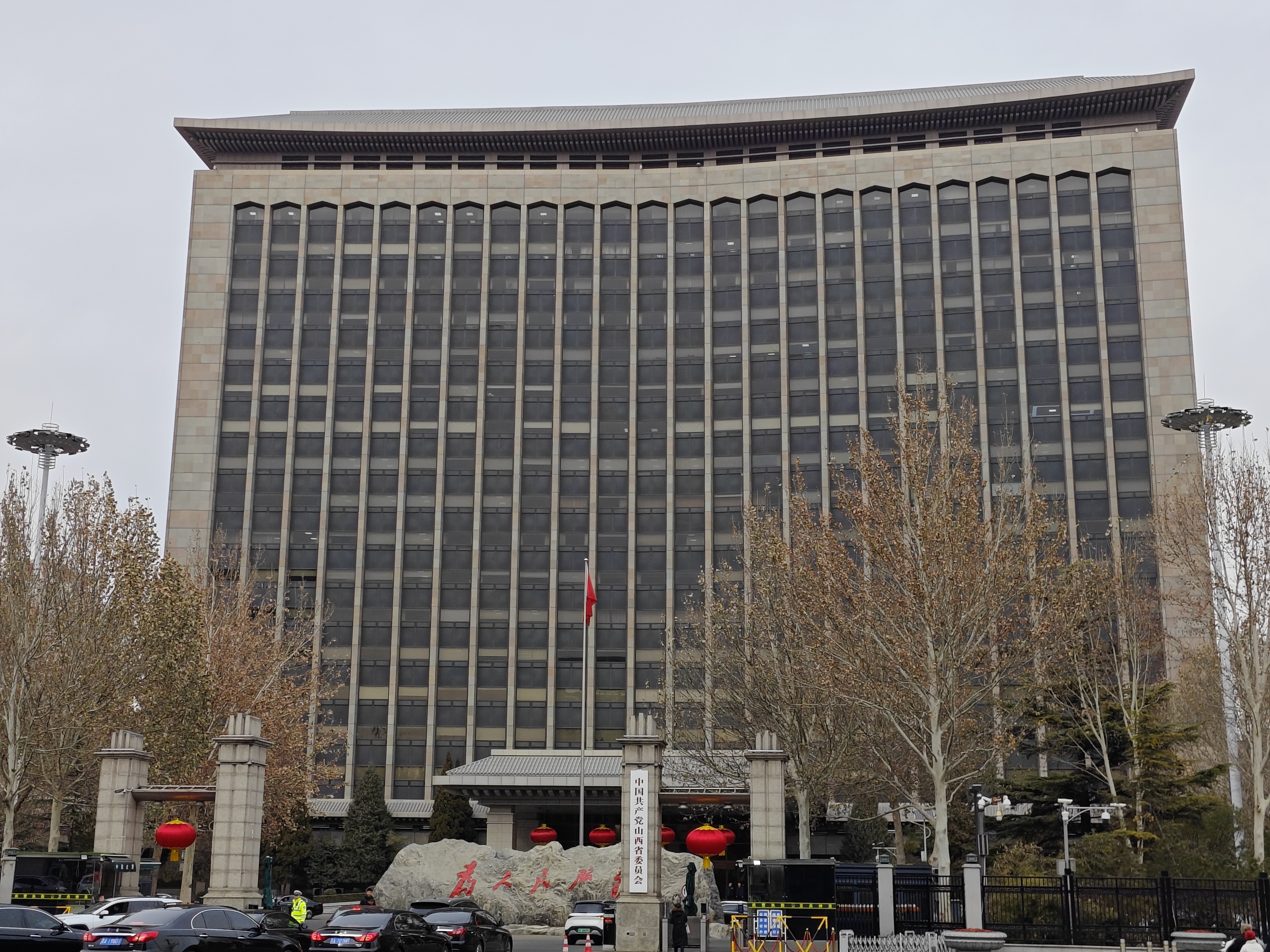

Shanxi Provincial Committee of the Chinese Communist Party
- Simplified Chinese: 中国共产党山西省委员会
- Traditional Chinese: 中國共產黨山西省委員會
Transcriptions
Standard Mandarin
- Hanyu Pinyin: Zhōngguó Gòngchǎndǎng Shānxīshěng Wěiyuánhuì

Abbreviation
- Simplified Chinese: 中共山西省委
- Traditional Chinese: 中共山西省委
- Literal meaning: CCP Shanxi Provincial Committee
Transcriptions

The Shanxi Provincial Committee of the Chinese Communist Party is the provincial committee of the Chinese Communist Party (CCP) in Shanxi, China, and the province's top authority. The CCP committee secretary is the highest ranking post in the province.

== Organizations ==
The organization of the Shanxi Provincial Committee includes:

- General Office

=== Functional Departments ===
- Organization Department
- Publicity Department
- United Front Work Department
- Political and Legal Affairs Commission
- Social Work Department
- Commission for Discipline Inspection
- Supervisory Commission

=== Offices ===
- Policy Research Office
- Office of the Cyberspace Affairs Commission
- Office of the Foreign Affairs Commission
- Office of the Deepening Reform Commission
- Office of the Institutional Organization Commission
- Office of the Military-civilian Fusion Development Committee
- Taiwan Work Office
- Office of the Leading Group for Inspection Work
- Bureau of Veteran Cadres

=== Dispatched institutions ===
- Working Committee of the Organs Directly Affiliated to the Shanxi Provincial Committee

=== Organizations directly under the Committee ===
- Shanxi Party School
- Shanxi Daily Newspaper Group
- Shanxi Institute of Socialism
- Party History Research Office
- Shanxi Provincial Archives
- Lecturer Group

=== Organization managed by the work organization ===
- Confidential Bureau

== Leadership ==
=== Heads of the Organization Department ===
Name (English)	Name (Chinese)	Term start	Term end	Ref.
Hu Lijie	胡立杰	February 2024		

=== Heads of the Publicity Department ===
Name (English)	Name (Chinese)	Term start	Term end	Ref.
Zhang Jifu	张吉福	December 2022		

=== Secretaries of the Political and Legal Affairs Commission ===
Name (English)	Name (Chinese)	Term start	Term end	Ref.
Zheng Liansheng	郑连生	November 2021		

=== Heads of the United Front Work Department ===
Name (English)	Name (Chinese)	Term start	Term end	Ref.
Li Jinke	李金科	November 2024		

== See also ==
- Politics of Shanxi
