= Oppose Book Worship =

1930 essay by Mao Zedong

Oppose Book Worship (Chinese: 反对本本主义) is a 1930 essay written by Mao Zedong which criticizes dogmatism in the form of excessive reliance on classical Marxist works or higher leadership bodies.

== Background ==
Mao was well known within the Chinese Communist Party (CCP) for his investigations into the conditions of rural China. His views on the peasantry differed from the traditional Marxist class analysis espoused by the Soviet-trained party leadership, at times resulting in their rebukes of Mao.

In 1930, Mao wrote Oppose Book Worship to criticize what he viewed as excessive reliance on Marxist classics or higher party organs in ways and analysis that departed from what Mao viewed as China's actual conditions. The text reflects Mao's philosophical focus on materialist dialectics.

== Content ==
Mao's frequent slogan "no investigation, no right to speak" is a theme throughout the essay. In Mao's view, "the victory of the Chinese revolutionary struggle will depend on the Chinese comrades' correct understanding of Chinese conditions."

According to this view, the classical Marxist works were important because Marx's "theory has been proved correct in our practice and in our struggle ... We should study Marxist books, but [this study] must be integrated with our country's actual conditions. We need books, but we must overcome book worship, which is divorced from the actual situation." In this view, Marxism–Leninism requires theory to be tied to local conditions through revolutionary practice.

Regarding reliance on higher bodies of the CCP, Mao wrote, "When we say that a directive of a higher organ of leadership is correct, it is not just because it comes from 'a higher organ of leadership,' but because its contents conform to the objective and subjective circumstances of the struggle."

A famous quote from the essay referring to the method for solving problems, research: «You can't solve a problem? Well, get down and investigate the present facts and its past history! When you have investigated the problem thoroughly, you will know how to solve it. Conclusions invariably come after investigation, and not before. Only a blockhead cudgels his brains on his own, or together with a group, to "find a solution" or "evolve an idea" without making any investigation. It must be stressed that this cannot possibly lead to any effective solution or any good idea.»

== Legacy ==
Mao later expanded on these criticisms of dogmatism in his 1937 text On Practice.
