= Lai Ruoyu =

Chinese politician

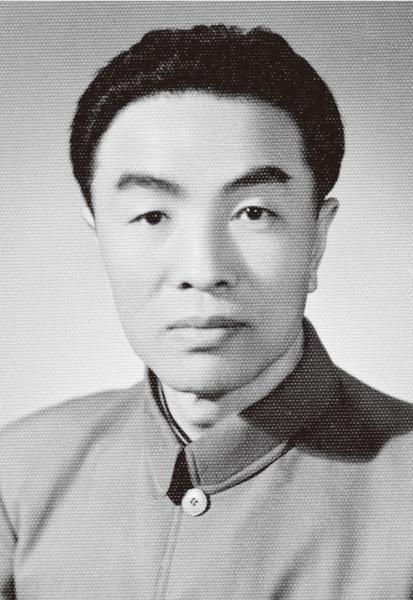
Lai Ruoyu

Lai Ruoyu (Chinese: 赖若愚) (January 1, 1910 – May 20, 1958) was a Chinese politician. He was born in Wutai County, Shanxi Province. He joined the Chinese Communist Party in 1929. He was the Chinese Communist Party Committee Secretary of his home province from September 1950 to October 1952 and Governor from February 1951 to May 1952. He died of illness in Beijing.

Military offices
Preceded by Cheng Zihua	Political Commissar of Shanxi Military District; September 1950 – October 1952	Succeeded by Gao Kelin
Party political offices
Preceded by Cheng Zihua	Party Secretary of Shanxi; September 1950 – October 1952	Succeeded by Xie Xuegong
Government offices
Preceded by Pei Lisheng	Governor of Shanxi; February 1951 – May 1952	Succeeded by Pei Lisheng
