= Lu Dongliang =

Chinese executive and politician

- 卢东亮

Governor of Shanxi
- Incumbent
- Assumed office 3 June 2025; Acting until 16 June 2025
- Preceded by: Jin Xiangjun

Communist Party Secretary of Datong
- In office 2 November 2021 – 12 December 2024
- Preceded by: Zhang Jifu
- Succeeded by: Zhang Qiang

Personal details
- Born: December 1973 (age 52) Kangping County, Liaoning, China
- Party: Chinese Communist Party
- Education: North China University of Technology

Chinese name
- Simplified Chinese: 卢东亮
- Traditional Chinese: 盧東亮
Transcriptions
Standard Mandarin
- Hanyu Pinyin: Lú Dōngliàng

Lu Dongliang (Chinese: 卢东亮; born December 1973) is a Chinese executive and politician. Since June 2025, he has served as Governor of Shanxi. Previously he served as party secretary of Datong, vice governor of Shanxi, and before that, chairman and party branch secretary of the Aluminum Corporation of China Limited.

He joined the Chinese Communist Party (CCP) in May 1993 and began his political career in May 2020. He is a representative of the 20th National Congress of the Chinese Communist Party and a member of the 20th Central Committee of the Chinese Communist Party.

== Biography ==
Lu was born in Kangping County, Liaoning, in December 1973. In 1991, he entered North China University of Technology, where he majored in accounting.

After graduating in 1995, Lu became an official in the audit department of China Nonferrous Metal Mining Group and then the finance department of Preparatory Group of China Copper Lead Zinc Group Corporation. Starting in October 2010, he served in several posts in the Aluminum Corporation of China Limited, including manager of the general management division, deputy general manager and general manager of the finance department, and general manager of the Lanzhou branch. He was promoted to deputy general manager in April 2016, concurrently serving as chairman and party branch secretary since February 2019.

Lu was appointed vice governor of Shanxi in May 2020 and in October 2021 was admitted as member of the Standing Committee of the CCP Shanxi Provincial Committee, the province's top authority. In November 2021, he was chosen as party secretary of Datong, the top political position in the city.

In December 2024, Lu was again appointed vice governor of Shanxi. In May 2025, Lu was appointed vice secretary of the CCP Shanxi Provincial Committee, then appointed acting governor of Shanxi in June 2025.

On 29 October 2026, at the fifth plenary session of the 20th CCP Central Committee, he was elected as a member of the Central Committee.

Government offices
Preceded by Jin Xiangjun	Governor of Shanxi; 2025–	Incumbent
Party political offices
Preceded by Zhang Jifu	Communist Party Secretary of Datong; 2021–2024	Succeeded by Zhang Qiang (born 1966)
