= Jin Xiangjun =

Chinese politician (born 1964)

- 金湘军
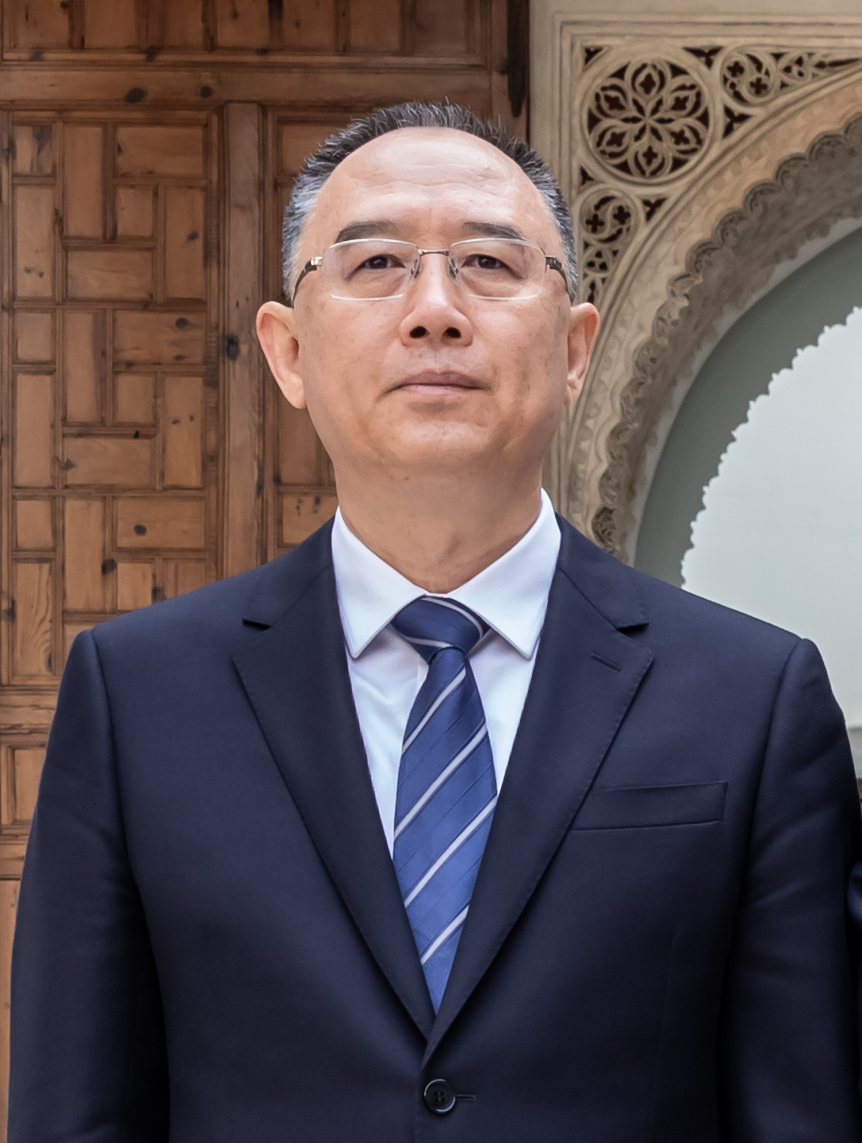
- Jin in 2024

Governor of Shanxi
- In office 29 December 2022 – 23 April 2025
- Party Secretary: Lan Fo'an; Tang Dengjie
- Preceded by: Lan Fo'an
- Succeeded by: Lu Dongliang

Specifically-designated Deputy Party Secretary of Tianjin
- In office 27 March 2022 – 29 December 2022
- Preceded by: Yin Hejun

Personal details
- Born: July 1964 (age 62) Jianghua County, Hunan, China
- Party: Chinese Communist Party (1984-2025, expelled)
- Education: University of Electronic Science and Technology of China; Chengdu University of Science and Technology; Huazhong University of Science and Technology

Chinese name
- Simplified Chinese: 金湘军
- Traditional Chinese: 金湘軍
Transcriptions
Standard Mandarin
- Hanyu Pinyin: Jīn Xiāngjūn

Jin Xiangjun (Chinese: 金湘军; born July 1964) is a Chinese politician who served as the Governor of Shanxi. He was the former deputy party secretary of Tianjin from March 2022 to December 2022 when he was appointed Governor.

He was a delegate to the 11th National People's Congress. He was a representative of the 18th National Congress of the Chinese Communist Party and 19th National Congress of the Chinese Communist Party. He is a representative of the 20th National Congress of the Chinese Communist Party and a member of the 20th Central Committee of the Chinese Communist Party.

== Early life and education ==
Jin was born in Jianghua County, Hunan, in July 1964.

Jin majored in computer software for his undergraduate education at the Department of Computer Science at the Chengdu Institute of Radio Engineering (nowadays University of Electronic Science and Technology of China) from September 1983 to July 1987. After his undergraduate studies, he pursued a master's degree in Industrial Management Engineering at the Department of Management Engineering at the Chengdu University of Science and Technology (nowadays Sichuan University) from July 1987 to July 1990. In September 1990, he earned a Master of Engineering degree from the Institute of Systems Science at the Chinese Academy of Sciences.

Jin also pursued professional development programs throughout his career in public office. From October 2002 to January 2003, he attended an intensive English training program for department-level officials at China Foreign Affairs University in Beijing. From July to September 2003, he completed an advanced training course in public administration jointly offered by Tsinghua University School of Public Policy and Management and Harvard Kennedy School of Government. From September 2007 to June 2010, he studied business administration at the Huazhong University of Science and Technology, earning a Doctor of Management. Subsequently, from September 2010 to January 2011, he participated in the 29th session of the first class of the Central Party School's training program for young and middle-aged cadres.

== Career ==
Jin joined the Chinese Communist Party (CCP) in November 1984. After University in 1990, he was assigned as an official to the Sichuan Provincial Department of Science and Technology.

Jin was transferred to south China's Hainan province and appointed an official of the Hainan National Spark Demonstration Zone Management Committee in August 1992 and then to the Hainan Airlines Tourism Development Co., Ltd. in March 1993. In December 1996, he became head of Fund Management Office of Hainan Social Security Bureau, but having held the position for only a year and a half.

In September 1998, Jin was transferred to southwest China's Guangxi Zhuang Autonomous Region and appointed deputy head of the Labor Department of Guangxi Zhuang Autonomous Region, which was reshuffled as Department of Labor and Social Security of Guangxi Zhuang Autonomous Region in April 2000. In October 2000, he became vice mayor of Yulin, rising to mayor in May 2003. He was party secretary, the top political position in the city, in February 2009, in addition to serving as chairman of its People's Congress. In January 2014, he moved to Fangchenggang and held five positions, including party secretary, chairman of the People's Congress, secretary of the Working Committee of Dongxing National Key Development and Opening up Pilot Zone, honorary president of Fangchenggang Disabled Persons' Federation, and honorary president of Fangchenggang Red Cross Society.

In January 2018, he was elevated to vice mayor of Tianjin, concurrently serving as director of the China (Tianjin) Pilot Free Trade Zone Management Committee since April 2019. He was appointed secretary-general of the CCP Tianjin Municipal Committee in January 2021 and was admitted to member of the Standing Committee of the CCP Tianjin Municipal Committee, the city's top authority. He was chosen as deputy party secretary of Tianjin in March 2022.

On 29 December 2022, he was transferred to north China's Shanxi province and appointed as governor.

== Downfall ==
On 12 April 2025, Jin was put under investigation for alleged "serious violations of discipline and laws" by the Central Commission for Discipline Inspection (CCDI), the party's internal disciplinary body, and the National Supervisory Commission, the highest anti-corruption agency of China. He was expelled from the Chinese Communist Party and public offices on 10 October 2025.

On 8 September 2026, Jin was sentenced to death with a two-year reprieve by a court in Xinyang for taking bribes of up to 148 million yuan ($21.8 million).

Government offices
Preceded by Li Daqiu	Mayor of Yulin; 2003–2009	Succeeded by Han Yuanli
Preceded by Lan Fo'an	Governor of Shanxi; 2022–2025	Succeeded by Lu Dongliang
Party political offices
Preceded by Wen Ming	Party Secretary of Yulin; 2009–2014	Succeeded by Wang Kai
Preceded by Liu Zhengdong	Party Secretary of Fangchenggang; 2014–2018	Succeeded by Li Yanqiang
Preceded by Li Yi	Secretary-General of the Tianjin Municipal Committee of the Chinese Communist Party; 2021–2022	Succeeded by Wang Lijun
Preceded by Yin Hejun	Deputy Party Secretary of Tianjin; 2022	Succeeded by Chen Fukuan
