= Tang Dengjie =

Chinese politician and business executive (born 1964)

- 唐登杰
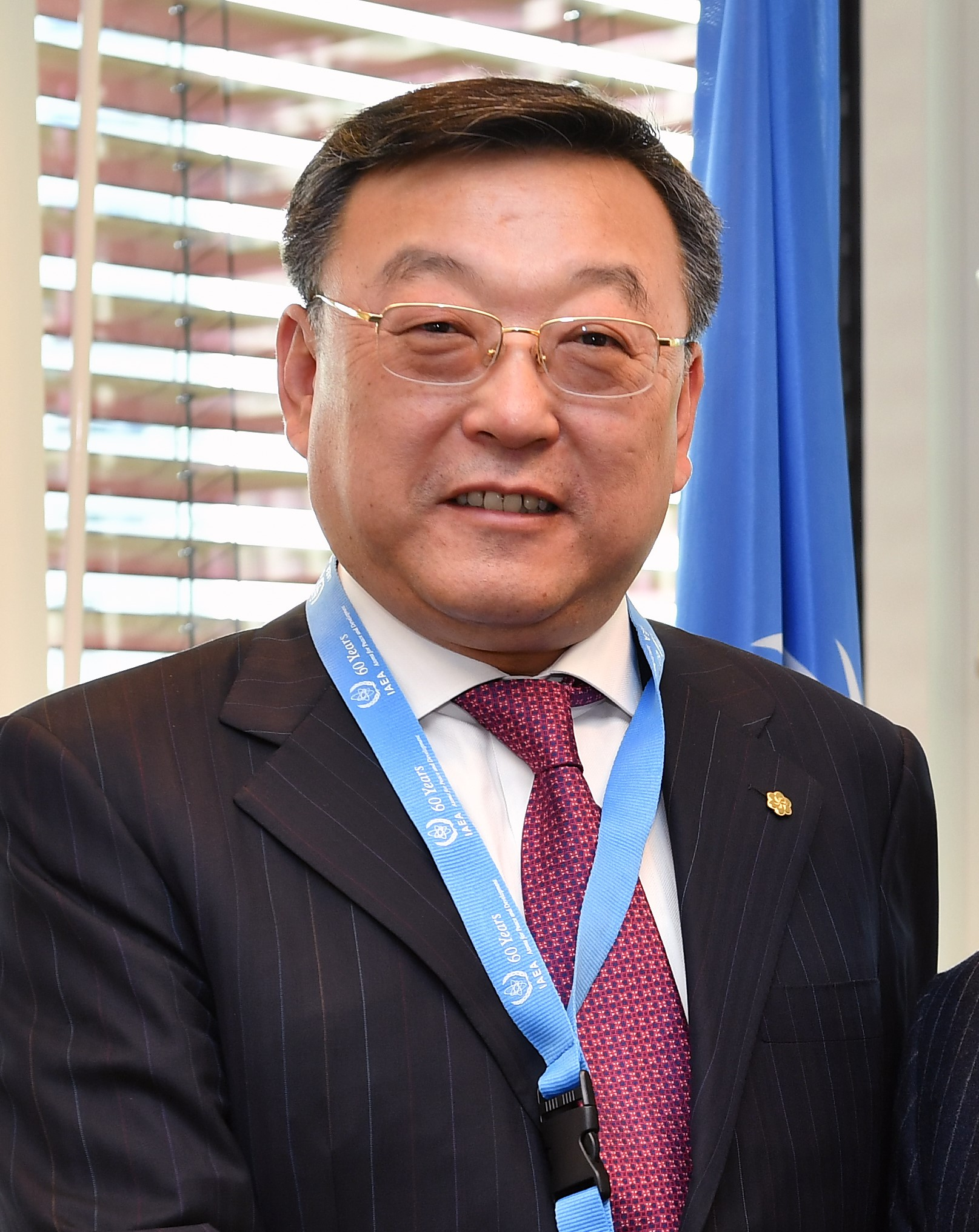
- Tang Dengjie, 2017.

Party Secretary of Shanxi
- Incumbent
- Assumed office 28 October 2023
- Governor: Jin Xiangjun
- Preceded by: Lan Fo'an

Minister of Civil Affairs
- In office 28 February 2022 – 29 December 2023
- Premier: Li Keqiang; Li Qiang
- Preceded by: Li Jiheng
- Succeeded by: Lu Zhiyuan

Governor of Fujian
- In office 2 January 2018 – 2 July 2020
- Preceded by: Yu Weiguo
- Succeeded by: Wang Ning

Director of the China National Space Administration
- In office May 2017 – December 2017
- Preceded by: Xu Dazhe
- Succeeded by: Zhang Kejian

Personal details
- Born: June 1964 (age 62) Shanghai, China
- Party: Chinese Communist Party
- Education: Tongji University

Chinese name
- Simplified Chinese: 唐登杰
- Traditional Chinese: 唐登傑
Transcriptions
Standard Mandarin
- Hanyu Pinyin: Táng Dēngjié

Tang Dengjie (Chinese: 唐登杰; born June 1964) is a Chinese politician and business executive who is currently serving as the Party Secretary of Shanxi.

Previously, he served as the deputy minister in charge of the National Development and Reform Commission and before that, governor of Fujian and director of the China National Space Administration. He spent much of his career in Shanghai, especially in the automobile industry. He has also served as the chief executive of the state-owned China South Industries Group and head of the China National Space Administration, and later as the Minister of Civil Affairs.

== Biography ==
Tang was born in Shanghai, and traces his ancestry to Jianhu County in Jiangsu province. He studied in Mechanical Engineering of Tongji University beginning in September 1981. After graduating, he worked at Shanghai Volkswagen as a technician, Director of its Industrial Engineering Branch, and Manager of Planning and Development. Later he was appointed as the manager of Shanghai ZF Steering Co., Ltd. and Vice President of Shanghai Automotive Industry Corporation. In 2001, he was appointed as the Chairman of Shanghai Electric.

In 2003, Tang was appointed as the Deputy Mayor of Shanghai, who was responsible for industry, agricultural, commercial, tourism, power production, and safe production. He was the youngest Deputy Mayor of Shanghai, and dubbed a "political star" with Lu Hao, who was appointed as the Deputy Mayor of Beijing at aged 35 in the same year. In 2008, he was re-elected as the Deputy Mayor, who was responsible for foreign affairs, foreign trade and economic cooperation, foreign investment, Hong Kong, Macao affairs, ethnic and religious affairs, and Overseas Chinese affairs.

In 2011, he was appointed as the General Manager of China South Industries Group, and President since 2013. In 2017, Tang was named the Vice Minister of the Ministry of Industry and Information Technology, Administrator of China National Space Administration, Chairman of China Atomic Energy Authority, and Director of the State Administration for Science, Technology and Industry for National Defence.

In December 2017, Tang was appointed as the deputy party chief of Fujian, and he was appointed as the Governor in January 2018. On 2 July 2020, he was appointed as deputy secretary of the party group of the National Development and Reform Commission; he also served as one of the deputy ministers in charge of the National Development and Reform Commission. On 28 February 2022, he became minister of Civil Affairs, succeeding Li Jiheng.

Tang was an alternate of the 19th Central Committee of the Chinese Communist Party and is a member of the 20th Central Committee.

On 28 October 2023, he was appointed as the Party Secretary of Shanxi. He was succeeded as minister of Civil Affairs by Lu Zhiyuan on 29 December 2023.

Business positions
Preceded by Xu Bin	General Manager of the China South Industries Group; 2011–2013	Succeeded by Xu Liuping
Preceded by Xu Bin	Chairman of the China South Industries Group; 2013–2017	Succeeded by Xu Ping
Government offices
Preceded by Xu Dazhe	Director of the China National Space Administration; 2017	Succeeded by Zhang Kejian
Preceded by Xu Dazhe	Vice Minister of Industry and Information Technology; 2017–2017	Succeeded by Zhang Kejian
Preceded by Yu Weiguo	Governor of Fujian; 2018–2020	Succeeded by Wang Ning
Preceded by Li Jiheng	Minister of Civil Affairs; 2022–2023	Succeeded by Lu Zhiyuan
Party political offices
Preceded by Lan Fo'an	Party Secretary of Shanxi; 2023–present	Incumbent
