= Gao Kelin =

Chinese politician and judge

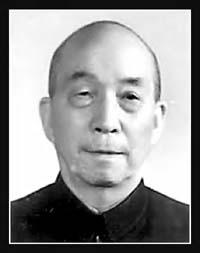

Gao Kelin (Chinese: 高克林) (March 11, 1907 – June 18, 2001) original name Gao Wenmin (Chinese: 高文敏), was a Chinese politician. He was born in Chishui Town, Hua County, Shaanxi Province (now part of Huazhou District, Weinan, Shaanxi Province). He was Party Secretary of Shaanxi.

Party political offices
Preceded by Xie Xuegong	Party Secretary of Shaanxi; 1952	Succeeded by Tao Lujia
Military offices
Preceded by Lai Ruoyu	Political Commissar of Shanxi Military District; 1952–1953	Succeeded by Tao Lujia
