= Xie Jianhua (major general) =

- 谢建华

Political Commissar of the Tianjin Garrison Command
- In office December 2007 – January 2012
- Preceded by: Ren Zhitong
- Succeeded by: Liao Keduo

Personal details
- Born: October 1953 (age 72) Huang County, Shandong, China
- Party: Chinese Communist Party
- Education: People's Liberation Army National Defense University

Military service
- Allegiance: People's Republic of China
- Branch/service: People's Liberation Army Ground Force
- Years of service: 1969–2016
- Rank: Major general

Chinese name
- Simplified Chinese: 谢建华
- Traditional Chinese: 謝建華
Transcriptions
Standard Mandarin
- Hanyu Pinyin: Xiè Jiànhuá

Xie Jianhua (Chinese: 谢建华; born October 1953) is a major general in the People's Liberation Army of China who served as political commissar of the Tianjin Garrison Command from 2007 to 2012. He was a delegate to the 11th and 12th National People's Congress.

== Biography ==
Xie was born in Huang County, Shandong, in October 1953, and graduated from the People's Liberation Army National Defense University. He secondary studied at Jurong County High School.

Xie enlisted in the People's Liberation Army (PLA) in December 1969, and joined the Chinese Communist Party (CCP) in January 1971. Starting in December 1969, he served in several posts in the Nanjing Military Region, including officer of the Political Division of Organization Department, secretary of the Political Department Office, and director of the Secretariat of the Political Department Office.

In April 1990, Xie was transferred to the General Political Department of the People's Liberation Army, where he was secretary for General Yu Yongbo between April 1993 and February 1996.

Xie was chosen as director of the Political Department of the Tianjin Garrison Command in July 1998, and served until March 2022, when he was made deputy political commissar of the 38th Group Army (now 82nd Group Army). He attained the rank of major general (shaojiang) in July 2000. He was recalled to Tianjin Garrison Command in November 2007 and appointed political commissar. In January 2010, he was admitted to standing committee member of the CCP Tianjin Municipal Committee, the city's top authority.

In May 2012, Xie was transferred to Beijing Military Region and commissioned as deputy director of the Political Department.

Military offices
Preceded by Ren Zhitong	Political Commissar of the Tianjin Garrison Command; 2007–2012	Succeeded by Liao Keduo
