= Zheng Lin =

Chinese calligrapher and politician

Zheng Lin (Chinese: 郑林) (1908–1987) was a Chinese calligrapher and politician. He was born in Yongji, Shanxi. He was vice-governor and CPPCC Committee Chairman of Shanxi. He was a delegate to the 3rd National People's Congress and a member of the Standing Committee of the Chinese People's Political Consultative Conference.

Preceded by Wang Qian	CPPCC Committee Chairman of Shanxi	Succeeded by Wu Guangtang
