= Wang Tingdong =

Chinese politician

Wang Tingdong (Chinese: 王庭栋; 1923 – December 21, 2010) was a Chinese politician. He was born in Pingding County, Shanxi. He was a delegate to the 7th National People's Congress and 8th National People's Congress.

Preceded by Ruan Posheng	Chairman of the Shanxi People's Congress; 1988–1993	Succeeded by Lu Gongxun
