= Zhongnan University of Economics and Law =

Public university in Wuhan, Hubei, China

Coordinates: 30.475224°N 114.393532°E

- 中南财经政法大学
- Former name: Zhongyuan University
- Motto: 博文明理，厚德济世
- Motto in English: Learned, Rational, Virtuous, Devoted
- Type: Public university
- Established: 1948; 78 years ago
- Chairman: Luan Yongyu (栾永玉)
- President: Yang Canming (杨灿明)
- Faculty: 1,173
- Administrative staff: 2,517
- Students: over 30,000
- Undergraduates: c. 20,000
- Postgraduates: c. 6,400
- Doctoral students: c. 650
- Location: Wuhan, Hubei, China
- Campus: Shouyi Campus and Nanhu Campus
- Website: zuel.edu.cn

The Zhongnan University of Economics and Law (ZUEL; 中南财经政法大学; lit. 'Central–southern University of Finance, Economics, Political Science and Law') is a public university located in Wuhan, Hubei, China. It is affiliated with the Ministry of Education, and co-funded by Ministry of Education, Ministry of Finance, and Hubei Provincial People's Government. The university is part of the Double First-Class Construction and Project 211.

ZUEL was established in 2000 with the merge of the then Central South University of Finance and Economics (中南财经大学) and then Central South Political Science and Law College (中南政法学院). Its root could be traced to 1948 when then Zhongyuan University (中原大学) was founded in the Province of Henan and later moved to Wuhan.

== History ==
The Zhongnan University of Economics and Law was founded in 1948 as Zhongyuan University, whose financial department later merged with the economic and financial departments from Wuhan University, Sun Yat-sen University, etc.

To form the Central South Institute of Finance (later it became the Central South University of Finance and Economics, 中南财经大学) and whose law department merged with other schools' to form the Central South Institute of Law (中南政法学院). The two universities were subsequently merged and separated throughout the Cultural Revolution and finally merged again to form the university today.

== Academics ==
The Zhongnan University of Economics and Law comprises 19 schools, 51 undergraduate programs, 104 master programs, 57 doctoral programs, 6 post-doctoral programs, 1 key research base of humanities at the state level, 4 key disciplines at the state level, 10 key research bases of humanities at the provincial level, 19 key disciplines at the ministerial and provincial level.

Zhongnan University of Economics and Law has a high-level research faculty of over 2,660 full-time teaching and administrative staff, including 219 professors, 500 associate professors, and 160 doctoral supervisors. It is "authorized to award MBA, EMBA, JM, MPAcc, MPA, ME (Master of Education) degrees, and enrolls students from overseas as well as from Taiwan, Hong Kong, and Macao". The MBA program of this university was accredited by the Association of MBAs.

The Zhongnan University of Economics and Law enrolls over 20,000 full-time undergraduates, 6,000 postgraduate students, 900 doctoral students and post-doctoral students, over 9,000 adult students, and 400 international students.

The "Zhongnan University of Economics and Law has a group of learned scholars who have prestige in the academic world of management, economics, and law, both at home and abroad. More than 45 professors are sponsored by the State Council of China, and more than 65 professors have been awarded the title of Young Experts of Hubei Province with Prominent Contributions to the Country with expert allowance. In the past 25 years, the faculty has accomplished over 400 items of key research projects at the state and provincial level. Among which, 100 items were the projects of the State Social Science Fund, the State Natural Science Fund, and the key project of the Ministry of Education, 187 of these being the key projects were sponsored by the Ministry of Finance and the Ministry of Justice. The faculty has made over 30,000 research contributions, including more than 1,300 monographs, more than 1,700 textbooks, and more than 21,000 articles, with more than 500 publications in foreign countries."

=== Constituent Schools ===
- School of Marxism
- School of Philosophy
- Economics School
- School of Public Finance and Taxation
- School of Finance
- Law School
- Criminal Justice School
- School of Foreign Languages
- School of Journalism and Mass Communication
- School of Business Administration
- School of Accounting
- School of Public Administration
- School of Statistics and Mathematics
- School of Information and Safety Engineering
- Wenlan School of Business
- School of Intellectual Property Rights
- MBA School
- School of Continuing Education(School of Network Education)
- China and South Korea School of New Media
- School of International Education

== Campus ==
The campus of Zhongnan University of Economics and Law "covers an area of over 210 hectares, and has a combined floor space of 800,000 square meters". "The university library has a collection of over 2.5 million volumes, possessing the national and global information retrieval system and offering its students ready access to the cyber world. In addition, it has 8 modern stadiums, two of which were used as the major sports field for the National University Games, the National Series-A Football Match, the Finals of College Men's Soccer Tournament of China, as well as the East Asia College Soccer Match. It has two state-of-the-art auditoriums and over 30 apartment buildings that are used as student dormitories. Beautiful and spacious, ZUEL campuses are decorated with lakes, trees, grass and flowers."

== Rankings and reputation ==
As of 2022, Zhongnan University of Economics and Law ranked # 1 in the South Central China region and top 4 nationwide (the only university outside Beijing and Shanghai) among all universities specialized in finance, business, and economics in the Best Chinese Universities Ranking. Internationally, Zhongnan University of Economics and Law has been ranked among the top # 500 universities worldwide for "Economics" and "Management".

== International Education ==
Zhongnan University of Economics and Law is part of the prestigious "五院四系" and is one of the first universities to offer programs in law. It holds considerable influence in the legal field and consistently ranks among the top ten law schools in China. "In the fields of international academic exchange, Zhongnan University of Economics and Law has developed a worldwide cooperative research and academic exchange relationships with universities and research institutions of more than 20 countries and regions in Asia, Europe, America, and Australia. Zhongnan University of Economics and Law is open to all educators, scholars, and students from all over the world. Since the 1950s, Zhongnan University of Economics and Law have nurtured many international students. In the past 58 years, Zhongnan University of Economics and Law has cultivated more than 200,000 students and has made great contribution to the development of China."
