= Li Jianhua (diplomat) =

Chinese diplomat

Counsellor Li Jianhua
- 李剑华 (pinyin: Lǐ Jiànhuá)
- Education: Bachelor of Arts in Arabic Studies, 1969, Beijing Second Foreign Languages Institute
- Occupation: Diplomat
- Organization: Ministry of Foreign Affairs of PRC
- Spouse: Wu Sike
- Children: 2

Li Jianhua is a diplomat of the People's Republic of China and is Council member of the Association of Former Diplomats of China (AFDC).

She was admitted to the major of Arabic studies at Beijing Second Foreign Languages Institute in 1965 and joined the Ministry of Foreign Affairs after graduation. She worked for the Department of Asian and African Affairs and the Bureau for Chinese Diplomatic Missions Abroad and served successively as Counsellor at Chinese Embassies in Syria and Egypt.
