= Wang Shiying =

Chinese politician

- 王世英
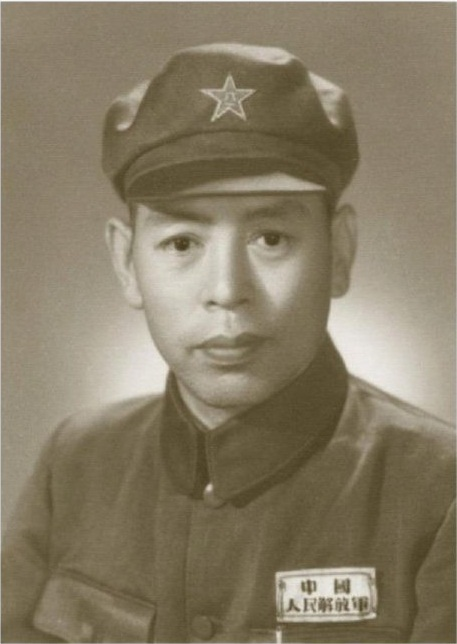

Governor of Shanxi
- In office April 1956 – November 1958
- Preceded by: Pei Lisheng
- Succeeded by: Wei Heng

Personal details
- Born: November 13, 1905 Dufu Village, Hongtong County, Shanxi
- Died: March 26, 1968 (aged 62) Beijing
- Party: Chinese Communist Party
- Spouse: Li Guoyi
- Children: 1 son
- Education: Whampoa Military Academy

Military service
- Allegiance: Chinese Communist Party; China
- Branch/service: People's Liberation Army
- Years of service: 1925-1949

Wang Shiying (Chinese: 王世英) (November 13, 1905 – March 26, 1968) was a Chinese politician. He was born in Hongtong County, Linfen, Shanxi. He was a graduate of the Whampoa Military Academy. He participated in the Northern Expedition, the Second Sino-Japanese War and the Chinese Civil War. He was a delegate to the 1st National People's Congress and the 2nd National People's Congress. He was the governor of his home province.

He was interrogated by radical elements during the Cultural Revolution and died during the struggle in 1968.

Preceded by Pei Lisheng	Governor of Shanxi; 1956–1958	Succeeded by Wei Heng
