= Zhang Jifu =

Chinese politician

- 张吉福

Communist Party Secretary of Datong
- Incumbent
- Assumed office July 2015
- Preceded by: Feng Lixiang

Communist Party Secretary of Pinggu District
- In office March 2013 – July 2015
- Preceded by: Qiu Shuiping
- Succeeded by: Jiang Fan

Head of Pinggu District
- In office September 2010 – March 2013
- Preceded by: Qiu Shuiping
- Succeeded by: Jiang Fan

Personal details
- Born: September 1964 (age 62) Tianjin, China
- Party: Chinese Communist Party
- Education: China Agricultural University; Central Party School of the Chinese Communist Party
- Occupation: Politician

Chinese name
- Traditional Chinese: 張吉福
- Simplified Chinese: 张吉福
Transcriptions
Standard Mandarin
- Hanyu Pinyin: Zhāng Jífú

Zhang Jifu (Chinese: 张吉福; born September 1964) is a Chinese politician, and the Communist Party Secretary of Datong. He entered the workforce in September 1989, and joined the Chinese Communist Party in March 1985.

Before his career in Datong, Zhang served as the Party Secretary for the district of Pinggu in Beijing from 2013 to 2015.

== Biography ==
Zhang was born and raised in Tianjin.

He graduated from the College of Agronomy and Biotechnology of China Agricultural University. After university, he was assigned to the Beijing Foreign Trade Import and Export Corporation and over a period of 9 years worked his way up to the position of manager. In March 2003 he became the deputy director of the Beijing Investment Promotion Bureau, rising to director three years later. In March 2010, he was named acting district head of Pinggu, replacing Qiu Shuiping (邱水平). He was promoted to Communist Party Secretary, the top political position in the district, in March 2013.

In July 2015 he was transferred to Datong, Shanxi, and appointed the Communist Party Secretary there. In November 2016, he was named a member of the provincial party standing committee.

He was a delegate to the 19th National Congress of the Chinese Communist Party.

Government offices
Previous: Qiu Shuiping (邱水平)	Head of Pinggu District; 2010-2013	Next: Jiang Fan (姜帆)
Party political offices
Previous: Qiu Shuiping (邱水平)	Communist Party Secretary of Pinggu District; 2013-2015	Next: Jiang Fan (姜帆)
Previous: Feng Lixiang	Communist Party Secretary of Datong; 2015	Incumbent
