= Tao Lujia =

Chinese politician

Tao Lujia (Chinese: 陶鲁笳) (February 1917 – May 21, 2011) was a Chinese politician. He was born in Liyang, Jiangsu. He was Chinese Communist Party Committee Secretary and Chinese People's Political Consultative Conference Committee Chairman of Shanxi. He was an alternate member of the 8th Central Committee of the Chinese Communist Party and a full member of the 10th Central Committee of the Chinese Communist Party. He was delegate to the 1st National People's Congress and 3rd National People's Congress.

Party political offices
Preceded by Gao Kelin	Communist Party Chief of Shanxi; 1952–1965	Succeeded by Wei Heng
Military offices
Preceded by Gao Kelin	Political Commissar of Shanxi Military District; 1953–1965	Succeeded by Wei Heng
Assembly seats
New title	CPPCC Committee Chairman of Shanxi; 1955–1965	Succeeded by Wei Heng
