= Wei Heng =

Chinese Communist revolutionary and politician

- 卫恒
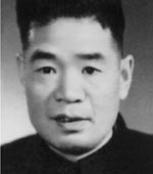
- Wei, c. 1960

Party First Secretary of Shanxi
- In office August 1965 – August 1967
- Preceded by: Tao Lujia
- Succeeded by: Liu Geping

Governor of Shanxi
- In office December 1965 – January 1967
- Preceded by: Wang Shiying
- Succeeded by: Wang Qian

Personal details
- Born: 1915 Lingchuan, Shanxi, China
- Died: 29 January 1967 (aged 51) Taiyuan, Shanxi, China
- Party: Chinese Communist Party

Wei Heng (Chinese: 卫恒; 1915 – 29 January 1967), also known as Wei Laiyu (魏来玉), was a Chinese Communist revolutionary and politician from Shanxi province. He was the Communist Party First Secretary and top leader of Shanxi province until he was overthrown by the rebel Red Guards at the beginning of the Cultural Revolution. He was tortured and committed suicide in January 1967.

== Early life ==
Wei Heng was born in 1915 to a poor peasant family in Shapochi village (沙泊池) in Lingchuan County, Shanxi province. His father Wang Changju (王长居) was a manual labourer who struggled to make ends meet, and Wei Heng was adopted by a relative surnamed Wei in a neighbouring village. Wei attended primary and secondary school and then became a primary school teacher. However, his adoptive father began to gamble and smoke opium, and the Wei family fortunes began to gradually decline.

== Career ==
After the Second Sino-Japanese War broke out, Wei Heng joined the Chinese Red Army in January 1938. He served as a guerrilla fighter and later political operative in his native Shanxi. He joined the Chinese Communist Party (CCP) in October 1938, and was selected as a delegate to the 7th National Congress of the Chinese Communist Party held in Yan'an in 1945. He took part in the Yan'an Rectification Movement.

After the founding of the People's Republic of China in 1949, Wei served in a series of leadership posts in locales in Shanxi province, including a stint as Party Secretary of Yuncheng. In April 1952, Wei Heng began working as part of the CCP's Shanxi Provincial Committee as head of its Organization Department, and then the provincial Secretary for Commission for Discipline Inspection. He became the provincial governor, and by June 1965 began serving as First Secretary (i.e. top leader) of the province.

== Downfall and death ==
Beginning with the 1967 January Storm at the early stage of the Cultural Revolution, the radical Red Guards started an intense wave of power seizures all over China, with the encouragement of the Central Cultural Revolution Group. The radicals toppled provincial governments and established revolutionary committees. In Shanxi, Wei Heng was outmaneuvered by his deputy Liu Geping, a Muslim who had the personal support of Mao Zedong and especially Kang Sheng, as well as top leaders of the Shanxi Military District. Liu became the leader of the Shanxi General Command of Revolutionary Rebels, and seized power of the Shanxi provincial government on January 12.

Wei Heng was detained by the Red Guards and held in solitary confinement on January 15. He was tortured by the rebels and committed suicide on January 29. He was the third provincial-level chief to choose suicide as an escape from torture, after Wan Xiaotang of Tianjin and Yan Hongyan of Yunnan. On January 25, the People's Daily published an editorial celebrating the power seizure in Shanxi, and the national government certified the Shanxi Revolutionary Committee on March 28.

== Rehabilitation ==
After the end of the Cultural Revolution, provincial party authorities posthumously rehabilitated Wei in January 1979. In June 1985, the party "completely vindicated" Wei Heng and denounced his persecution.
