= Wu Guangtang =

Chinese politician

Wu Guangtang (Chinese: 武光汤) (1908–1985) was a Chinese politician. He was born in Wuxiang County, Shanxi. He was vice-governor and CPPCC Committee Chairman of his home province.

Preceded by Zheng Lin	CPPCC Chairman of Shanxi	Succeeded by Li Xiuren
