= Ningxia Hui Autonomous Regional Committee of the Chinese People's Political Consultative Conference =

Ningxia Hui Autonomous Regional Committee of the Chinese People's Political Consultative Conference 中国人民政治协商会议宁夏回族自治区委员会
- 12th
- Emblem of the Chinese People's Political Consultative Conference

Type
- Type: United front organ Constitutional convention (Historical); Legislature (Historical) of Chinese People's Political Consultative Conference

History
- Founded: February 1955; 71 years ago
- Preceded by: Ningxia Hui Autonomous Regional People's Congress Consultative Committee

Leadership
- Chairperson: Chen Yong

Website
- www.nxzx.gov.cn

Chinese name
- Simplified Chinese: 中国人民政治协商会议宁夏回族自治区委员会
- Traditional Chinese: 中國人民政治協商會議寧夏回族自治區委員會
Transcriptions
Standard Mandarin
- Hanyu Pinyin: Zhōngguó Rénmín Zhèngzhì Xiéshāng Níngxià Huízú Zìzhìqū Wěiyuánhuì

Abbreviation
- Simplified Chinese: 宁夏回族自治区政协
- Traditional Chinese: 宁夏回族自治区政協
- Literal meaning: CPPCC Ningxia Hui Autonomous Regional Committee
Transcriptions
Standard Mandarin
- Hanyu Pinyin: Níngxià Huízú Zìzhìqū Zhèngxié

The Ningxia Hui Autonomous Regional Committee of the Chinese People's Political Consultative Conference (Chinese: 中国人民政治协商会议宁夏回族自治区委员会; abbreviation CPPCC Ningxia Hui Autonomous Regional Committee) is the provincial advisory body and a local organization of the Chinese People's Political Consultative Conference in Ningxia, China. It is supervised and directed by the Ningxia Hui Autonomous Regional Committee of the Chinese Communist Party.

== History ==
The Ningxia Hui Autonomous Regional Committee of the Chinese People's Political Consultative Conference traces its origins to the Ningxia Hui Autonomous Regional People's Congress Consultative Committee (宁夏回族自治区各界人民代表会议协商委员会), founded in 1950.

=== Anti-corruption campaign ===
In October 2024, Qi Tongsheng was put under investigation for alleged "serious violations of discipline and laws" by the Central Commission for Discipline Inspection (CCDI), the party's internal disciplinary body, and the National Supervisory Commission, the highest anti-corruption agency of China.

== Term ==
=== 1st ===
- Term: October 1958 –September 1964
- Chairperson: Li Jinglin
- Vice Chairpersons: Ma Siyi, Yuan Jinzhang, Li Chonghe, He Yijiang, Hong Qingguo, Liu Zhenhuan (March 1960–), Lei Qilin (May 1961–)

=== 2nd ===
- Term: September 1964 –December 1977
- Chairperson: Li Jinglin
- Vice Chairpersons: Yuan Jinzhang, Li Chonghe, Liu Zhenhuan, Liu Jizeng, Lei Qilin, Hong Qingguo

=== 3rd ===
- Term: December 1977 –April 1983
- Chairperson: Yang Jingren (–June 1979) → Wang Jinzhang (June 1979–)
- Vice Chairpersons: Li Jinglin, Wang Jinzhang (–June 1979), Lei Qilin, Niu Huadong, Wu Hongye, Jin Sanshou, Huang Zhizhong, Ma Teng'ai, Hong Qingguo, Ma Peixun (April 1979–), Li * Kaiguo (January 1980–), Yang Zhengxi (January 1980–), Luo Wenwei (January 1980 –April 1980), Li Qingping (January 1980–), Jin Fengshan (January 1980–), Li *Fengzao (January 1980–)

=== 4th ===
- Term: April 1983 –June 1988
- C hairperson: Wang Jinzhang → Li Yunhe (April 1985–)
- Vice Chairpersons: Lei Qilin, Chen Jingbo, Ma Likai, Zhang Yuan, Jin Sanshou, Hong Qingguo, Ma Liesun, Yang Zhengxi, Yang Yuchun, Jin Fengshan, Li Fengzao, Wu Shangxian, Yang Xin (April 1985–), Ma Dezhong (April 1986–)

=== 5th ===
- Term: June 1988 –May 1993
- Chairperson: Li Yunhe
- Vice Chairpersons: Shen Xiaozeng, Lei Qilin, Chen Jingbo, Ma Likai, Hong Qingguo, Ma Liesun, Wu Shangxian, Yang Xin, Ma Dezhong, Wang Yu, Liu Minsheng (April 1989–), Hao Tingzao (April 1990–), Qiang E (April 1990–)

=== 6th ===
- Term: May 1993 –May 1998
- Chairperson: Liu Guofan
- Vice Chairpersons: Lei Qilin (–December 1994), Hao Tingzao, Hong Qingguo, Ma Liesun, Wu Shangxian, Liu Minsheng, Qiang E, Tong Kaijin, Hong Weizong (April 1996–), Feng Jionghua (April 1996–), Wei Shicheng (April 1996–)

=== 7th ===
- Term: May 1998 –January 2003
- Chairperson: Ma Sizhong
- Vice Chairpersons: Ren Huaixiang, Zhou Wenji, Liu Minsheng, Hong Weizong, Wei Shicheng, Jin Xiaoyun, Zhou Zhenzhong, Liang Jian, Ma Guoquan

=== 8th ===
- Term: January 2003 –January 2008
- Chairperson: Ren Qixing
- Vice Chairpersons: Ren Huaixiang, Jin Xiaoyun, Zhou Zhenzhong, Liang Jian, Ma Guoquan, Li Zenglin, Chen Yuning, Ma Zhanshan, Ma Ruiwen, Cao Weixing

=== 9th ===
- Term: January 2008 –January 2013
- Chairperson: Xiang Zongxi
- Vice Chairpersons: Li Shufen, Ma Guoquan, Chen Shouxin, Yuan Hanmin, Tao Yuan, Xie Menglin, Zhang Leqin, An Chunren
- Secretary-General: Zhu Yuhua

=== 10th ===
- Term: January 2013 –January 2018
- Chairperson: Qi Tongsheng
- Vice Chairpersons: Li Shufen, Zhang Leqin, An Chunren, Zuo Jun, Liu Xiaohe, Tian Chengjiang, Zhang Xuewu, Zhang Shouzhi, Hong Yang
- Secretary-General: Liu Hui

=== 11th ===
- Term: January 2018 –January 2023
- Chairperson: Cui Bo
- Vice Chairpersons: Li Yankai (–January 2021), Zhang Shouzhi, Hong Yang, Ma Li (–January 2021), Guo Hu (–September 2022), Feng Zhiqiang, Li Zefeng (–February 2022), Wang Ziyun, Ma Xiuzhen, Zheng Zhen (January 2021–), Xu Ning (January 2021–), Zhao Yongqing (January 2022–), Yang Peijun (January 2022–)
- Secretary-General: Ruan Jiaoyu

=== 12th ===
- Term: January 2023–2028
- Chairperson: Chen Yong
- Vice Chairpersons: Wang Heshan, Hong Yang, Liu Kewei, Ma Xiuzhen, Zheng Zhen, Xu Ning, Ma Wenjuan, Lu Jun, Yang Shuli (January 2024–)
- Secretary-General: Cao Zhibin
