= 同生 =

同生 is an East Asian word.

It may refer to:

- Dōshō, meaning "Same Birth" in Japanese Buddhist
- Qi Tongsheng (齐同生): chairmen of CPPCC Ningxia Committee (2013-2018)
- Sibling (동생), one of South Korean poet Jo Eun's poetry.
