= Mao Rubai =

Chinese politician

- 毛如柏

Chairperson of the National People's Congress Environment Protection and Resources Conservation Committee
- In office March 2003 – March 2008
- Preceded by: Qu Geping
- Succeeded by: Wang Guangtao

Chairman of Ningxia People's Congress
- In office May 1998 – April 2002
- Preceded by: Ma Sizhong
- Succeeded by: Chen Jianguo

Party Secretary of Ningxia
- In office August 1997 – April 2002
- Governor: Ma Qizhi
- Preceded by: Huang Huang
- Succeeded by: Chen Jianguo

Personal details
- Born: May 1938 (age 88) Yangzhou, Jiangsu, China
- Party: Chinese Communist Party
- Education: Nanjing University

Mao Rubai (Chinese: 毛如柏; pinyin: Máo Rúbǎi; born May 1938) is a Chinese politician who served as party secretary of Ningxia from 1997 to 2002 and chairman of Ningxia People's Congress from 1998 to 2002. He also served as chairperson of the National People's Congress Environment Protection and Resources Conservation Committee from 2003 to 2008.

He was a member of the 15th Central Committee of the Chinese Communist Party. He was a delegate to the 9th National People's Congress.

== Early life and education ==
Mao was born in Yangzhou, Jiangsu, in May 1938. He secondary studied at Yangzhou High School of Jiangsu Province. In 1955, he entered Nanjing University, majoring in the Department of Meteorology.

== Career in Tibet ==
He joined the Chinese Communist Party (CCP) in November 1959. He was assigned to the Meteorological Bureau of Tibet Autonomous Region in August 1961, becoming director in December 1980. He was appointed deputy party secretary of Tibet Autonomous Region in December 1984, concurrently serving as vice chairman of Tibet Autonomous Region since March 1986.

== Ministry of Construction ==
In April 1993, he was transferred to Beijing and appointed vice minister of the Ministry of Construction.

== Career in Ningxia ==
He was chosen as party secretary of Ningxia in August 1997, concurrently serving as chairman of Ningxia People's Congress since May 1998.

== National People's Congress ==
He became vice chairperson of the National People's Congress Environment Protection and Resources Conservation Committee in April 2002, and was promoted to chairperson in March 2003.

Government offices
Preceded by Huang Huang	Party Secretary of Ningxia; 1997–2002	Succeeded by Chen Jianguo
Party political offices
Preceded by Ma Sizhong	Chairman of Ningxia People's Congress; 1998–2002	Succeeded by Chen Jianguo
Assembly seats
Preceded by Qu Geping	Chairperson of the National People's Congress Environment Protection and Resources Conservation Committee; 2003–2008	Succeeded by Wang Guangtao
