= Chen Xiangsheng =

Chinese engineer

- 陈湘生
- Born: 1 June 1956 (age 70); Xiangtan, Hunan, China
- Education: Anhui University of Science and Technology; Tsinghua University
- Scientific career
- Fields: Tunnel; Underground engineering
- Workplaces: Shenzhen University; Shenzhen Metro Company Co., Ltd.

Chinese name
- Simplified Chinese: 陈湘生
- Traditional Chinese: 陳湘生
Transcriptions
Standard Mandarin
- Hanyu Pinyin: Chén Xiāngshēng

Chen Xiangsheng (born 1 June 1956) is a Chinese engineer who is a professor and dean of the College of Civil and Transportation Engineering, Shenzhen University and chief engineer of Shenzhen Metro Company Co., Ltd., and an academician of the Chinese Academy of Engineering.

== Biography ==
Chen was born in Xiangtan, Hunan, on 1 June 1956. In 1978, he entered Huainan Institute of Mining (now Anhui University of Science and Technology), where he earned his Bachelor of Engineering degree in 1982. He also received his Doctor of Engineering degree from Tsinghua University in 2000.

Beginning in February 1982, he served in several posts in the Beijing Mine Research Institute, Coal Research Institute, including deputy engineer, engineer, and senior engineer. From July 1986 to October 1986, he was a visiting scholar at Technische Universität Berlin. He joined the Communist Party in July 1987. In September 1991, he studied English at Shanghai International Studies University for a short while before serving as By-Fellow Professor at the University of Cambridge in September 1992, funded by the Cambridge University and Yue-Kong Pao Foundation. He returned to China in February 1994 and continued to work as deputy director and later director at the Beijing Mine Research Institute, Coal Research Institute. In February 2001, he was recruited by Shenzhen Metro Company Co., Ltd., where he successively worked as manager, chief dispatcher, chief engineer, and deputy general manager. In March 2019, he was hired by Shenzhen University as a professor and dean of the College of Civil and Transportation Engineering.

== Honours and awards ==
- 1992 State Science and Technology Progress Award (Second Class) for the construction technology of Yanzhou Mining Area.
- 2001 State Science and Technology Progress Award (Second Class) for the research and application of basic mechanical properties of artificial frozen soil.
- 2007 State Science and Technology Progress Award (Second Class) for the research on key technologies of design and construction of subway overlapping tunnel.
- 27 November 2017 Member of the Chinese Academy of Engineering (CAE)
