= Li Yunhe (politician) =

Chinese politician

- 李恽和

Chairman of the Ningxia Hui Autonomous Regional Committee of the Chinese People's Political Consultative Conference
- In office April 1985 – May 1993
- Preceded by: Wang Jinzhang
- Succeeded by: Liu Guofan

Personal details
- Born: July 1921 Dingxiang County, Shanxi, China
- Died: 10 May 2003 (aged 81) Beijing, China
- Party: Chinese Communist Party
- Education: Shanxi Provincial Normal School

Military service
- Allegiance: People's Republic of China
- Branch/service: People's Liberation Army Ground Force
- Years of service: 1937–1949
- Battles/wars: Second Sino-Japanese War; Chinese Civil War

Chinese name
- Simplified Chinese: 李恽和
- Traditional Chinese: 李惲和
Transcriptions
Standard Mandarin
- Hanyu Pinyin: Lǐ Yùnhé

Li Yunhe (Chinese: 李恽和; July 1921 – 10 May 2003) was a Chinese politician who served as chairman of the Ningxia Hui Autonomous Regional Committee of the Chinese People's Political Consultative Conference between 1985 and 1993. He was a delegate to the 4th and 5th National People's Congress. He was a representative of the 13th National Congress of the Chinese Communist Party.

== Biography ==
Li was born into a peasant family in Dingxiang County, Shanxi, in July 1921. He attended Dingxiang Middle School and Shanxi Provincial Normal School. Influenced by progressive ideas at school, he actively participated in the Counter Japanese and National Salvation Activities organized by underground party organizations, and participated in the "Shanxi Revolutionary Mutual Aid Association" (山西革命互济会), a peripheral organization of the Chinese Communist Party (CCP).

Li enlisted in the Dare-to-Die Corps of Shanxi Youths (山西青年抗敌决死队) in July 1937, and joined the CCP in January 1938. During the Second Sino-Japanese War, he received assignment as secretary of the Political Department of the 4th Column and engaged in the Hundred Regiments Offensive.

During the Chinese Civil War, Li was present at the battles of Xinzhou (忻州战役), Lvliang (吕梁战役), Fenxiao (汾孝战役), Yan'an (延安战役), Shajiadian (沙家店战役), Hancheng (韩城战役), Yichuan (宜川战役), Xifu (西府战役), Xiaojinzhen (肖金镇战役), Lizhen (荔镇战役), Yongfeng (永丰战役), Fumei (扶眉战役), and Lanzhou (兰州战役).

After founding of the Communist State, in March 1950, Li was commissioned as deputy director and then director of the Political Department of the 5th Army of the People's Liberation Army, concurrently serving as secretary-general and head of Propaganda of the CCP Ili District Committee. Since October 1952, he was transferred to ürümqi, capital of Xinjiang Uygur Autonomous Region, and successively served as deputy director and then director of the Office of the CCP Xinjiang Branch, deputy head of the Work and Transportation Department of the CCP Xinjiang Uygur Autonomous Regional Committee, deputy director and party branch secretary of the Xinjiang Uygur Autonomous Region Economic Commission, director of the Work and Transportation Political Department, director of the Infrastructure Commission, deputy leader of the Production Group of the Xinjiang Uygur Autonomous Regional Revolutionary Committee, deputy director of the War Preparedness Office of the Xinjiang Military Region, deputy party secretary of Xinjiang Uygur Autonomous Region, and member of the CCP Xinjiang Uygur Autonomous Regional Committee, the region's top authority.

In August 1978, Li was transferred to the neighboring Ningxia Hui Autonomous Region and appointed vice chairman of the autonomous region and member of the CCP Ningxia Hui Autonomous Regional Committee, the region's top authority. He became deputy party secretary of Ningxia in April 1982. In April 1985, he was proposed as chairman of the Ningxia Hui Autonomous Regional Committee of the Chinese People's Political Consultative Conference, and served until May 1993.

Li retired in May 1995.

On 10 May 2003, li died in Beijing, at the age of 81.

Assembly seats
Preceded by Wang Jinzhang	Chairman of the Ningxia Hui Autonomous Regional Committee of the Chinese People's Political Consultative Conference; 1985–1993	Succeeded by Liu Guofan
