= Cui Bo =

Chinese politician

- 崔波

Chairman of the Ningxia Hui Autonomous Regional Committee of the Chinese People's Political Consultative Conference
- In office January 2018 – March 2023
- Preceded by: Qi Tongsheng
- Succeeded by: Chen Yong

Personal details
- Born: July 1957 (age 69) Zou County, Shandong, China
- Party: Chinese Communist Party
- Education: Shandong Agricultural University; Dalian University of Technology

Cui Bo (Chinese: 崔波; pinyin: Cuī Bō; born July 1957) is a Chinese politician who served as chairman of the Ningxia Hui Autonomous Regional Committee of the Chinese People's Political Consultative Conference from 2018 to 2023.

Cui was an alternate of the 18th Central Committee of the Chinese Communist Party. He was a member of the 10th, 13th and 14th National Committee of the Chinese People's Political Consultative Conference.

== Early life and education ==
Cui was born in Zou County (now Zoucheng), Shandong, in July 1957. He graduated from Shandong Agricultural College (now Shandong Agricultural University) in 1983.

== Career ==
Cui joined the Chinese Communist Party (CCP) in August 1975, and entered the workforce in March 1976.

Cui was party secretary of Xiangcheng District in June 1983 and subsequently secretary of Jining Municipal Committee of the Communist Youth League of China in March 1984.

Cui became mayor of Qufu, a county-level city under the jurisdiction of Jining, in March 1985, and then party secretary, the top political position in the city, beginning in July 1986.

Cui was deputy secretary of Shandong Provincial Committee of the Communist Youth League of China in September 1992, in addition to serving as president of Shandong Provincial Youth Federation.

In November 1994, Cui was transferred to Beijing and assigned to the Communist Youth League of China, where he successively served as head of the Department for Safeguarding Youth Rights and Interests, head of the Agriculture and Youth Department, and secretary of the Secretariat of the Central Committee. He also served as vice president of the All-China Youth Federation from December 2001 to May 2003.

Cui was appointed vice chairman of Ningxia in May 2003 and seven months later was admitted to member of the CCP Ningxia Hui Autonomous Regional Committee, the region's top authority. He was appointed party secretary of Yinchuan in December 2003, concurrently serving as deputy party secretary of Ningxia since August 2011. In January 2017, he became vice chairman of the Ningxia Hui Autonomous Regional Committee of the Chinese People's Political Consultative Conference, rising to chairman the next year.

In March 2023, Cui took office as vice chairperson of the Committee for Handling Proposals of the Chinese People's Political Consultative Conference.

Civic offices
Preceded by Zhang Ruofei	Head of the Department for Safeguarding Youth Rights and Interests of the Communist Youth League of China; 1994–1995	Succeeded by Qiao Baoping
Preceded by Guo Tingdong	Head of the Agriculture and Youth Department of the Communist Youth League of China; 1995–1998	Succeeded by Wang Xiaodong
Party political offices
Preceded by Wang Zhengwei	Communist Party Secretary of Yinchuan; 2003–2011	Succeeded by Xu Guangguo
Preceded by Cai Guoying	Secretary-General of the Ningxia Hui Autonomous Regional Committee of the Chinese Communist Party; 2012–2013	Succeeded by Ji Zheng
Preceded by Yu Gesheng	Specifically-designated Deputy Communist Party Secretary of Ningxia; 2011–2017	Succeeded by Jiang Zhigang
Assembly seats
Preceded by Qi Tongsheng	Chairman of the Ningxia Hui Autonomous Regional Committee of the Chinese People's Political Consultative Conference; 2018–2023	Succeeded by Chen Yong
