= Environmental Protection and Resources Conservation Committee =

Committee of the National People's Congress in People's Republic of China

- 全国人民代表大会环境与资源保护委员会
- Formation: March 1993
- Type: Special committee
- Legal status: Active
- Location: Beijing
- Chairperson: Lu Xinshe
- Parent organization: National People's Congress; Standing Committee of the National People's Congress (when the NPC is not in session)

The Environmental Protection and Resources Conservation Committee of the National People's Congress (Chinese: 全国人民代表大会环境与资源保护委员会; pinyin: Quánguó Rénmín Dàibiǎo Dàhuì Huánjìng Yǔ Zīyuán Bǎohù Wěiyuánhuì) is one of nine special committees of the National People's Congress, the national legislature of the People's Republic of China. The special committee was created during the first session of the 8th National People's Congress in March 1993.

== Chairpersons ==
Congress	Chairperson	Vice-Chairs	Members
8th National People's Congress	Qu Geping (曲格平)		
9th National People's Congress	Qu Geping (曲格平)		
10th National People's Congress	Mao Rubai (毛如柏)		
11th National People's Congress	Wang Guangtao (汪光焘)		
12th National People's Congress	Lu Hao	Wang Yunlong (王云龙); Bai Enpei (expelled); Zhang Yunchuan; Wang Hongju; Luo Qingquan; Wei Liucheng; Meng Wei; Huang Xiaojing; Jiang Jufeng; Huang Xianzhong; Wang Qingxi (王庆喜); Gong Jianming (龚建明); Liu Deshu (刘德树); Yuan Si (袁驷)	Bao Ruiling (包瑞玲); Lü Caixia (吕彩霞); Yan Xiaopei (闫小培); Mi Bohua (米博华); Sun Qin (孙勤); Li Shiming (李世明); Li Qingyin (李清印); Yang Wei (杨卫); Yang Gengyu (杨庚宇); Zhang Xingkai (张兴凯); Zhou Laiqiang; Zhao Zhongxin; Duan Qiang (段强); Gu Yidong (顾逸东); Jiang Zhuangde (蒋庄德); Pu Changcheng (蒲长城); Dou Shuhua (窦树华)
13th National People's Congress	Gao Hucheng		
14th National People's Congress	Lu Xinshe	Lü Zhongmei (吕忠梅)	

== See also ==
- Committee of Population, Resources and Environment, CPPCC NC counterpart
