= Li Jinglin =

Li Jinglin, may refer to:

- Li Jinglin (general) (born 1885), Chinese general
- Li Jinglin (politician) (born 1909), Chinese politician, chairman of the Ningxia Hui Autonomous Regional Committee of the Chinese People's Political Consultative Conference from 1958 to 1966
