= Politics of Ningxia =

Governmental system within mainland China

The Politics of Ningxia Autonomous Region in the People's Republic of China is structured in a dual party-government system like all other governing institutions in mainland China.

The Chairman of the Autonomous Region is the highest-ranking official in the People's Government of Ningxia. However, in the Autonomous Region's dual party-government governing system, the chairman has less power than the Chinese Communist Party (CCP) Ningxia Committee Secretary, colloquially termed the "Ningxia CCP Party Chief".

== List of the CCP Ningxia Committee secretaries ==
No.	Name	Term start	Term end	Ref.
1	Pan Zili (潘自力) (1904–1972)	1949	October 1951	
2	Zhu Min (朱敏) (1912–1981)	October 1951	December 1952	
3	Li Jinglin (李景林) (1910–1998)	January 1953	July 1954	
–	Liu Geping (刘格平) (1904–1992)	November 1957	1959	
4	Wang Feng (汪锋) (1910–1998)	February 1959	January 1961	
5	Yang Jingren (楊靜仁) (1918–2001)	January 1961	January 1967	
6	Kang Jianmin (康健民) (1916–1977)	1971	January 1977	
7	Huo Shilian (霍士廉) (born 1909–1996)	January 1977	February 1979	
8	Li Xuezhi (李学智) (1923–2005)	February 1979	4 January 1987	
9	Shen Daren (沈达人) (1928–2017)	4 January 1987	16 December 1989	
10	Huang Huang (黄璜) (born 1933)	16 December 1989	August 1997	
11	Mao Rubai (毛如柏) (born 1938)	August 1997	March 2002	
12	Chen Jianguo (陈建国) (born 1945)	March 2002	July 2010	
13	Zhang Yi (张毅) (born 1950)	July 2010	19 March 2013	
14	Li Jianhua (李建华) (born 1954)	19 March 2013	26 April 2017	
15	Shi Taifeng (石泰峰) (born 1956)	26 April 2017	25 October 2019	
16	Chen Run'er (陈润儿) (born 1957)	25 October 2019	28 March 2022	
17	Liang Yanshun (梁言顺) (born 1962)	28 March 2022	28 June 2024	
18	Li Yifei (李邑飞) (born 1964)	28 June 2024	Incumbent	

== List of chairmen of Ningxia Government ==
1. Pan Zili (潘自力): 1949–1951
2. Xing Zhaotang (邢肇棠): 1951–1954
3. Liu Geping (刘格平): 1958–1960
4. Yang Jingren (杨静仁): 1960–1967
5. Kang Jianmin (康健民): 1968–1977
6. Huo Shilian (霍士廉): 1977.01–1979
7. Ma Xin (马信): 1979–1982.
8. Hei Boli (黑伯理): 1982–1987
9. Bai Lichen (白立忱): 1986–1997
10. Ma Qizhi (马启智): 1997–2007
11. Wang Zhengwei (王正伟): 2007–2013
12. Liu Hui (刘慧): 2013–2016
13. Xian Hui (咸辉): 2016–2022
14. Zhang Yupu (张雨浦): 2022–incumbent

== List of chairmen of Ningxia People's Congress ==
1. Ma Qingnian (马青年):1980–1987
2. Hei Boli (黑伯理): 1987–1988
3. Ma Sizhong (马思忠): 1988–1998
4. Ma Rubai (毛如柏): 1998–2002
5. Chen Jianguo (陈建国):2002–2010
6. Zhang Yi: (张毅): 2010–2013
7. Li Jianhua: 2013–2017
8. Shi Taifeng: 2017–2019
9. Chen Run'er: 2019–2022
10. Zhang Yupu (张雨浦): 2022–present

== List of chairmen of CPPCC Ningxia Committee ==
1. Li Jinglin (李景林): 1958–1967
2. Yang Jingren (杨静仁): 1977–1978
3. Wang Jinzhang (王金璋): 1980–1985
4. Li Yunhe (李恽和): 1985–1993
5. Liu Guofan (刘国范): 1993–1998
6. Ma Sizhong (馬思忠): 1998–2001
7. Ren Qixing (任启兴): 2001 – January 2008
8. Xiang Zongxi (项宗西): January 2008 – 2013
9. Qi Tongsheng (齐同生): 2013–2018
10. Cui Po (崔波): 2018–2023
11. Chen Yong (陈雍): 2023–present
