= Wang Feng (politician) =

Chinese politician

- 汪锋
- Wang Feng
- Born: December 17, 1910; Lantian County, Shaanxi Province, Qing Empire
- Died: December 12, 1998 (aged 87); Beijing, People's Republic of China
- Occupation: politician
- Political party: Chinese Communist Party

Wang Feng (Chinese: 汪锋; December 17, 1910 – December 12, 1998), original surname Wang (Chinese: 王), was a Chinese politician, born in Lantian, Shaanxi Province. He was Chinese Communist Party Committee Secretary of Gansu, twice Chinese Communist Party Committee Secretary of Ningxia and Chinese Communist Party Committee Secretary and Chairman of Xinjiang (1978).

== Biography ==
=== First Nationalist-Communist Civil War ===
Wang Feng became a member of the Communist Youth League of China in 1926, and subsequently joined the Chinese Communist Party in 1927. He held the positions of chairman of the Lantian County School Federation and secretary of the Youth League Committee. In May 1928, he participated in the Weihua Uprising and thereafter assumed the role of secretary of the CCP Shaanxi Provincial Committee (Chinese: 中共陕西省委). Subsequently, he assumed the role of secretary of the Lantian County Committee of the CCP. Subsequent to 1931, he assumed the role of organization minister of the Military Committee of the CCP Shaanxi Provincial Committee and served as the secretary of the Military Committee. Beginning in 1932, he served as the secretary of the Weibei Special Committee of the CCP, the Acting Political Commissar of the Second Regiment of the Red 26th Army, and the secretary of the CCP Hanzhong Special Committee. During the winter of 1934, he commenced employment at the CCP Provisional Central Bureau in Shanghai. In December 1935, Mao Zedong personally appointed Wang Feng to travel to Xi'an in the name of the Red Army, holding a handwritten letter from Mao Zedong and Peng Dehuai to Yang Hucheng, Du Bincheng, and Deng Baoshan, to negotiate on behalf of the Red Army and the Seventeenth Route Army, and to ultimately strive for them to refrain from attacking each other and to unite to fight against the Japanese with the Red Army. In the spring of 1936, he assumed the role of secretary for the CCP Guanzhong Special Committee. Subsequently, he was appointed as a special commissioner of the Northwest Army.

=== Second Nationalist-Communist Civil War ===
In 1938, he assumed leadership of the Military Department of the CCP Shaanxi Provincial Committee (Chinese: 中共陕西省委军事部). Subsequent to 1941, he became leadership of the United Front Work Department of the CCP Shaanxi Provincial Committee and served as the deputy secretary of the CCP Guanzhong Local Committee. Subsequent to 1945, he assumed the roles of secretary of the CCP Shaanxi Provincial Committee, secretary of the CCP Party Committee of the E-Yu-Shaan Frontier Region, chairman of the Frontier Region Government, and political commissar of both the E-Yu-Shaan Military Region and the Thirty-eighth Army of the Northwest Democratic United Army. Subsequent to 1948, he assumed the role of secretary of the CCP Southern Shaanxi District Committee, Southern Shaanxi Military Region (Chinese: 陕南军区), and political commissar of the 19th Army.

=== People's Republic of China ===
Following the establishment of the People's Republic of China, Wang Feng assumed the roles of deputy minister and minister of the United Front Work Department of the Northwest Bureau of the CCP Central Committee, as well as director of the Ethnic Affairs Committee of the Northwest Military and Political Commission. In 1953, he was appointed deputy minister of the United Front Work Department of the CCP Central Committee, deputy director of the State People's Committee, and first secretary of the CCP Ningxia Hui Autonomous Region Committee. In 1960, he served as the secretary of the Secretariat of the Northwest Bureau of the CCP Central Committee, the first secretary of the CCP Gansu Committee, and the first political commissar of the Gansu Military Region. Subsequent to 1977, he held the positions of Second Secretary and First Secretary of the Xinjiang Uygur Autonomous Regional Committee of the Chinese Communist Party, Director of the Autonomous Region Reform Committee, Chairman of the Xinjiang Uygur Autonomous Region Committee of the Chinese People's Political Consultative Conference (CPPCC), as well as Second Political Commissar, First Political Commissar, and First Secretary of the Party Committee of the Urumqi Military Region (Chinese: 乌鲁木齐军区).

In 1986, he became Vice Chairman of the Sixth National Committee of the Chinese People's Political Consultative Conference and a member of the Central Advisory Commission. On December 12, 1998, Wang Feng died at the age of 88 in Beijing.

Party political offices
Preceded by Liu Geping	Communist Party Chief of Ningxia; 1958	Succeeded by Li Jinglin
Preceded by Li Jinglin	Communist Party Chief of Ningxia; 1959–1961	Succeeded by Yang Jingren
Preceded by Zhang Zhongliang	Communist Party Chief of Gansu; 1961–1966	Succeeded by Hu Jizong
Preceded by Saifuddin Azizi	Communist Party Chief of Xinjiang; 1978–1981	Succeeded by Wang Enmao
Government offices
Preceded by Saifuddin Azizi	Chairman of Xinjiang; 1978–1979	Succeeded by Ismail Amat
