= Wang Guangtao =

Chinese politician

- 汪光焘
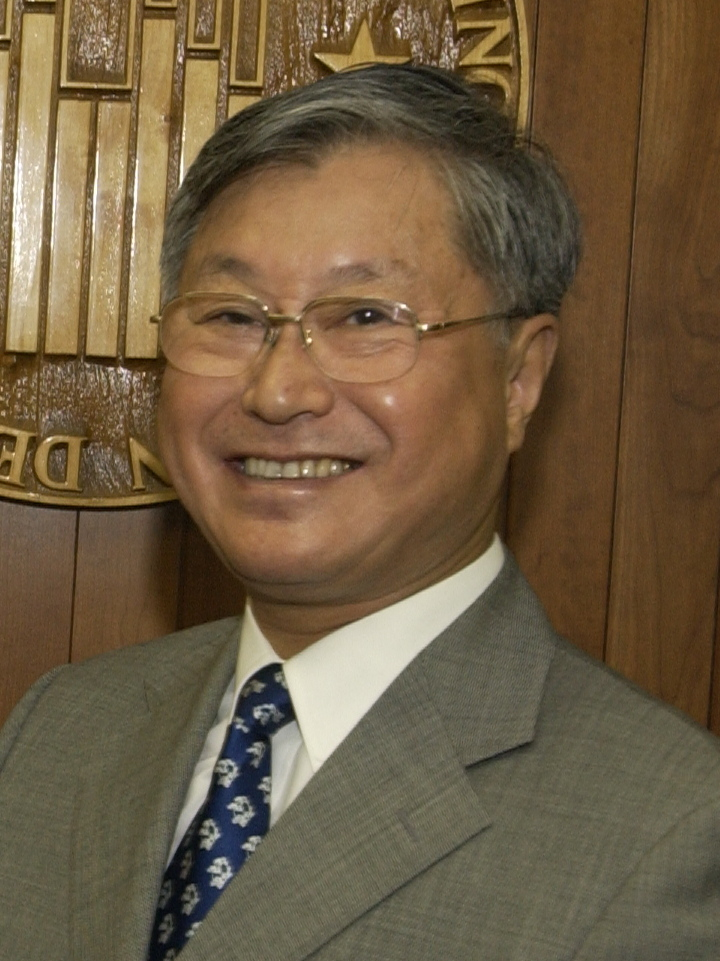
- Wang in 2007

Chairperson of the National People's Congress Environment Protection and Resources Conservation Committee
- In office March 2008 – March 2013
- Preceded by: Mao Rubai
- Succeeded by: Lu Hao

Minister of Construction
- In office December 2001 – March 2008
- Premier: Zhu Rongji; Wen Jiabao
- Preceded by: Yu Zhengsheng
- Succeeded by: Jiang Weixin

Personal details
- Born: June 1943 (age 83) Shanghai, China
- Party: Chinese Communist Party
- Education: Tongji University
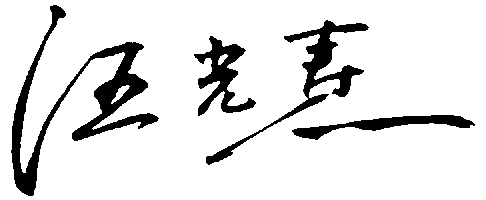
- Signature

Chinese name
- Simplified Chinese: 汪光焘
- Traditional Chinese: 王光燾
Transcriptions
Standard Mandarin
- Hanyu Pinyin: Wāng Guāngtāo

Wang Guangtao (Chinese: 汪光焘; born June 1943) is a Chinese politician who served as minister of Construction from 2001 to 2008 and chairperson of the National People's Congress Environment Protection and Resources Conservation Committee from 2008 to 2013. He was a member of the 16th Central Committee of the Chinese Communist Party. He was a member of the Standing Committee of the 11th National People's Congress.

== Biography ==
Wang was born in Shanghai, in June 1943, while his ancestral home in Xiuning County, Anhui. In 1960, he entered Tongji University, majoring in the Department of Construction. After university in 1965, he became a technician at Xuzhou Urban Construction Bureau (later renamed Xuzhou Urban and Rural Development Commission), and served until 1984. After resuming the college entrance examination in 1978, he received his Master of Engineering degree from Tongji University in 1981. He joined the Chinese Communist Party (CCP) in December 1983. He was vice mayor of Xuzhou in 1984, and held that office until 1989.

In December 2001, he was transferred to the Ministry of Construction and appointed director and chief engineer of the Urban Construction Department, that posts he kept until 1995.

In 1995, he was assigned to northeast China's Heilongjiang province and named acting mayor of the capital city Harbin.

He was recalled to Beijing in 1998 and was chosen as vice mayor, a position he held until November 2001. He became minister of Construction in December 2001, and served until March 2008, when he took office as chairperson of the National People's Congress Environment Protection and Resources Conservation Committee.

Government offices
Preceded by Yu Zhengsheng	Minister of Construction; 2001–2008	Succeeded by Jiang Weixin
Assembly seats
Preceded by Mao Rubai	Chairperson of the National People's Congress Environment Protection and Resources Conservation Committee; 2008–2013	Succeeded by Lu Hao
