= Chen Yong =

Chinese politician

- 陈雍

Chairman of the Ningxia Hui Autonomous Regional Committee of the Chinese People's Political Consultative Conference
- Incumbent
- Assumed office 15 January 2023
- Preceded by: Qi Tongsheng

Personal details
- Born: October 1966 (age 59) Beizhen County, Liaoning, China
- Party: Chinese Communist Party
- Education: Liaoning Normal University; University of Illinois Chicago

Chinese name
- Simplified Chinese: 陈雍
- Traditional Chinese: 陳雍
Transcriptions
Standard Mandarin
- Hanyu Pinyin: Chén Yōng

Chen Yong (Chinese: 陈雍; born October 1966) is a Chinese politician of Manchu ethnicity, currently serving as chairman of the Ningxia Hui Autonomous Regional Committee of the Chinese People's Political Consultative Conference, in office since January 2023.

Chen is an alternate of the 20th Central Committee of the Chinese Communist Party. He is a member of the 14th National Committee of the Chinese People's Political Consultative Conference. He was a member of the 19th Central Commission for Discipline Inspection. He was a delegate to the 13th National People's Congress.

== Early life and education ==
Chen was born in Beizhen County (now Beizhen), Liaoning, in October 1966. In 1984, he enrolled at Liaoning Normal University, where he majored in the Department of Politics. Chen joined the Chinese Communist Party (CCP) in January 1988 during his university years. He also earned a Master's in Business Administration degree from University of Illinois Chicago in April 2004.

== Career ==
After university in 1991, Chen became an official in Liaoning Provincial Supervision Department.

In February 1993, Chen moved to the Office of the Liaoning Branch of the China Construction Bank, and served as deputy director in March 1996.

In December 1998, Chen was transferred back to Liaoning Provincial Supervision Department and appointed assistant director, and eventually became deputy director in October 2002.

Chen was deputy party secretary of Fushun and secretary of the Fushun Municipal Commission for Discipline Inspection in September 2004 and subsequently secretary of the Shenyang Municipal Commission for Discipline Inspection in May 2008.

In December 2010, Chen was assigned to the Central Commission for Discipline Inspection (CCDI), the party's internal disciplinary body. At the CCDI, he was director of Performance Management Supervision Office in December 2011, director of Law Enforcement and Efficiency Supervision Office in May 2013, and director of the 12th Discipline Inspection and Supervision Office in March 2014. In April 2015, Chen was promoted to vice minister of supervision, but only served for over a year.

Chen became a member of the Standing Committee of the CCP Chongqing Municipal Committee, secretary of the Chongqing Municipal Commission for Discipline Inspection and director of Chongqing Municipal Supervision Commission in December 2016 before being assigned to the similar position in Beijing in October 2018.

Chen was appointed deputy party secretary of Ningxia in July 2021, concurrently serving as chairman of the Ningxia Hui Autonomous Regional Committee of the Chinese People's Political Consultative Conference since January 2023.

Party political offices
Preceded by Xu Songnan	Secretary of the Chongqing Municipal Commission for Discipline Inspection; 2016–2018	Succeeded by Mu Hongyu
Preceded by Zhang Shuofu	Secretary of the Beijing Municipal Commission for Discipline Inspection; 2018–2021	Succeeded by Chen Jian
Preceded by Jiang Zhigang	Specifically-designated Deputy Communist Party Secretary of Ningxia; 2021–2023	Succeeded by Zhuang Yan
Government offices
New title	Director of Chongqing Municipal Supervision Commission; 2018	Succeeded by Mu Hongyu
Preceded by Zhang Shuofu	Director of Beijing Municipal Supervision Commission –	Succeeded by Chen Jian
Assembly seats
Preceded by Qi Tongsheng	Chairman of the Ningxia Hui Autonomous Regional Committee of the Chinese People's Political Consultative Conference; 2023–present	Incumbent
