= Wang Jinzhang =

Chinese politician

- 王金璋

Chairman of the Ningxia Hui Autonomous Regional Committee of the Chinese People's Political Consultative Conference
- In office June 1979 – April 1985
- Preceded by: Yang Jingren
- Succeeded by: Li Yunhe

Personal details
- Born: 1907 Yanchang County, Shaanxi, Qing China
- Died: 1985 (aged 77–78) Yinchuan, Ningxia, China
- Party: Chinese Communist Party

Wang Jinzhang (Chinese: 王金璋; pinyin: Wang Jinzhang; 1907 – 17 November 1985) was a Chinese politician who served as chairman of the Ningxia Hui Autonomous Regional Committee of the Chinese People's Political Consultative Conference from 1979 to 1985.

== Biography ==
Wang was born in Yanchang County, Shaanxi, in 1907, during the Qing dynasty (1644–1911).

Wang joined the Communist Youth League of China in 1926 and joined the Chinese Communist Party (CCP) in 1928. He once served as party secretary of Fushi County (now Yan'an). In 1936, he took part in the Long March.

In September 1949, the People's Liberation Army seized Ningxia and Wang was appointed as head of the Organization Department of the CCP Ningxia Provincial Committee and director of the Civil Affairs Department, and was admitted to member of the CCP Ningxia Provincial Committee, the province's top authority. He became deputy director of Ningxia Provincial People's Supervision Commission in December 1949. After the merger of Ningxia and Gansu in September 1954, he served as director of the Gansu Provincial Department of Civil Affairs and member of the CCP Gansu Provincial Committee. In 1957, he was made a member of the CCP Ningxia Hui Autonomous Regional Working Committee and participated in the preparatory work for the establishment of the Ningxia Hui Autonomous Region. In October 1958, he was chosen as vice chairman of Ningxia Hui Autonomous Regional People's Government.

In 1966, the Cultural Revolution broke out, Wang was removed from office and effectively sidelined. He was reinstated as deputy head of the Security Department of the Ningxia Hui Autonomous Regional Revolutionary Committee and deputy leader of the Political and Legal Affairs Group of the CCP Ningxia Hui Autonomous Regional Committee in April 1972. He was appointed vice chairman of the Ningxia Hui Autonomous Regional Committee of the Chinese People's Political Consultative Conference in December 1977 and was admitted to member of the CCP Ningxia Hui Autonomous Regional Committee, the region's top authority. He was elevated to chairman in June 1979, and held that office until April 1985.

On 17 November 1985, Wang died in Yinchuan, at the age of 78.

Assembly seats
Preceded by Yang Jingren	Chairman of the Ningxia Hui Autonomous Regional Committee of the Chinese People's Political Consultative Conference; 1979–1985	Succeeded by Li Yunhe
