= Jiang Zhigang =

Chinese politician

- 姜志刚

Communist Party Secretary of Yinchuan
- In office June 2017 – January 2021
- Preceded by: Xu Guangguo
- Succeeded by: Zhang Zhu

Personal details
- Born: August 1960 (age 66) Donghai County, Jiangsu, China
- Party: Chinese Communist Party (1986–2023; expelled)
- Education: Beihang University; Northwestern Polytechnical University

Chinese name
- Simplified Chinese: 姜志刚
- Traditional Chinese: 姜志剛
Transcriptions
Standard Mandarin
- Hanyu Pinyin: Jiāng Zhìgāng

Jiang Zhigang (Chinese: 姜志刚; born August 1960) is a Chinese politician who served as deputy party secretary of Ningxia and party secretary of Yinchuan from 2017 to 2021.

He was a representative of the 19th National Congress of the Chinese Communist Party and an alternate of the 19th Central Committee of the Chinese Communist Party.

== Biography ==
Jiang was born in Donghai County, Jiangsu, in August 1960. After resuming the college entrance examination, in 1978, he entered Beihang University, where he majored in aerial equipment.

After graduating in 1982, Jiang was despatched to Chengdu Aircraft Industry Company, eventually becoming deputy general manager in December 1992. He joined the Chinese Communist Party (CCP) in August 1986. He was director of Human Resources Department of the China Aviation Industry Corporation I in September 1999 and subsequently deputy director of the 5th Bureau of Cadres of the Organization Department of the Chinese Communist Party in April 2001. He was appointed deputy director of the 1st Enterprise Leadership Administration Bureau of the State owned Assets Supervision and Administration Commission in May 2013, becoming deputy director of the 2nd Enterprise Leadership Administration Bureau in September 2003 and director of the 2nd Enterprise Leadership Administration Bureau in December 2003. He rose to become deputy director the State owned Assets Supervision and Administration Commission in October 2011.

In May 2013, he was appointed head of the Organization Department of the CCP Beijing Municipal Committee and was admitted to member of the Standing Committee of the CCP Beijing Municipal Committee, the city's top authority.

He was deputy party secretary of Ningxia in April 2017, in addition to serving as president of the Party School. Two months later, he concurrently served as party secretary of Yinchuan.

== Downfall ==
On 17 March 2023, Jiang he was put under investigation for alleged "serious violations of discipline and laws" by the Central Commission for Discipline Inspection (CCDI), the party's internal disciplinary body, and the National Supervisory Commission, the highest anti-corruption agency of China. On August 30, Jiang was stripped of his posts within the CCP and in the public office. On September 17, he was detained by the Supreme People's Procuratorate.

On 18 January 2024, Jiang was indicted on suspicion of accepting bribes. On June 20, he stood trial at the Intermediate People's Court of Hengshui on charges of taking bribes. Prosecutors accused him of taking advantage of his different positions between 2003 and 2023 to seek profits for various companies and individuals in franchise dealer qualification, project bidding and contracting and business cooperation and operation, in return, he accepted money and property worth over 79.98 million yuan ($11.14 million). On October 23, he was eventually sentenced to a 15-year jail and fined 5 million yuan for taking bribes, and all property gained from the bribery would be turned over to the national treasury.

Party political offices
Preceded by Lü Xiwen	Head of the Organization Department of the Beijing Municipal Committee of the Chinese Communist Party; 2013–2017	Succeeded by Wei Xiaodong
Preceded by Xu Guangguo	Communist Party Secretary of Yinchuan; 2017–2021	Succeeded by Zhang Zhu
Preceded by Cui Bo	Deputy Communist Party Secretary of Ningxia; 2017–2021	Succeeded by Chen Yong
