= Huang Huang =

Chinese politician

- 黄璜

Party Secretary of Ningxia
- In office December 1989 – August 1997
- Deputy: Bai Lichen (governor)
- Preceded by: Shen Daren
- Succeeded by: Mao Rubai

Party Secretary of Anhui
- In office December 1984 – April 1986
- Deputy: Wang Yuzhao (governor)
- Preceded by: Zhou Zijian (acting)
- Succeeded by: Li Guixian

Personal details
- Born: August 1933 (age 92–93) Lianshui County, Jiangsu, China
- Party: Chinese Communist Party

Chinese name
- Simplified Chinese: 黄璜
- Traditional Chinese: 黃璜
Transcriptions
Standard Mandarin
- Hanyu Pinyin: Huáng Huáng

Huang Huang (Chinese: 黄璜; born August 1933) is a Chinese Communist politician who served as party secretary of Anhui from 1984 to 1986 and party secretary of Ningxia from 1989 to 1997.

He was a member of the 12th and 14th Central Committee of the Chinese Communist Party. He was a delegate to the 6th and 7th National People's Congress. He was a member of the Standing Committee of the 9th and 10th Chinese People's Political Consultative Conference.

== Biography ==
Huang was born into a family of farming background in the town of Hongyao, Lianshui County, Jiangsu, in August 1933. He has five siblings.

Huang joined the Chinese Communist Party (CCP) in 1949. He was assigned to east China's Anhui province in 1953. He was made party secretary of Wangjiang County in 1960. In 1966, the Cultural Revolution broke out, he was removed from office and effectively sidelined. He was sent to the May Seventh Cadre Schools to do farm work in Feixi County in December 1969. He was reinstated in July 1972 as director of Publicity Department of the CCP Anhui Provincial Committee. He became first deputy party secretary of Wuwei County in April 1978. He was appointed party secretary of Huoqiu County in 1980 and was admitted as a member of the Standing Committee of the CCP Lu'an Municipal Committee, the city's top authority. In December 1984, he was promoted to become party secretary of Anhui, a position he held until April 1986.

He was appointed vice governor of Jiangxi in July 1987, after 34 years of working in Anhui province.

He became party secretary of Ningxia in December 1989, and served until August 1997.

Party political offices
Preceded by Zhou Zijian (acting)	Party Secretary of Anhui; 1984–1986	Succeeded by Li Guixian
Preceded by Shen Daren	Party Secretary of Ningxia; 1989–1997	Succeeded by Mao Rubai
