= Ren Qixing =

Chinese politician

- 任启兴

Chairman of the Ningxia Hui Autonomous Regional Committee of the Chinese People's Political Consultative Conference
- In office 19 February 2001 – January 2008
- Preceded by: Ma Sizhong
- Succeeded by: Xiang Zongxi

Personal details
- Born: October 1942 (age 83–84) Suixi County, Anhui, China
- Party: Chinese Communist Party
- Education: Anhui University of Science and Technology; Shandong University of Science and Technology

Chinese name
- Simplified Chinese: 任启兴
- Traditional Chinese: 任啟興
Transcriptions
Standard Mandarin
- Hanyu Pinyin: Rén Qǐxīng

Ren Qixing (Chinese: 任启兴; born October 1942) is a Chinese politician who served as chairman of the Ningxia Hui Autonomous Regional Committee of the Chinese People's Political Consultative Conference between 2001 and 2008. He was a representative of the 15th and 16th National Congress of the Chinese Communist Party. He was an alternate of the 15th Central Committee of the Chinese Communist Party. He was a member of the 9th and 10th National Committee of the Chinese People's Political Consultative Conference.

== Early life and education ==
Ren was born in Suixi County, Anhui, in October 1942, and graduated from Huainan Mining College (now Anhui University of Science and Technology) and Shandong Mining College (now Shandong University of Science and Technology).

== Career ==
From October 1967 to September 1969, during the Cultural Revolution, Ren worked in Jingyuan Coal Mine and then Shizuishan Coal Mine in northwest China's Gansu province.

Ren joined the Chinese Communist Party (CCP) in April 1965, and got involved in politics in September 1969, when he became an official in Shizuishan Revolutionary Committee.

In November 1972, Ren was appointed secretary and deputy director of the Secretariat of the Office of the CCP Ningxia Hui Autonomous Regional Committee, a position he held for over ten years.

Ren served as mayor and deputy party secretary of Shizuishan in June 1983 before being appointed vice chairman of Ningxia in May 1988. He was also admitted to member of the CCP Ningxia Hui Autonomous Regional Committee, the region's top authority. He was made deputy party secretary in April 1998. In February 2001, he took office as chairman of the Ningxia Hui Autonomous Regional Committee of the Chinese People's Political Consultative Conference, the provincial advisory body.

In March 2008, Ren was chosen as vice chairperson of the Committee of Population, Resources and Environment of the Chinese People's Political Consultative Conference, serving in the post until his retirement in March 2013.

Party political offices
Preceded by Li Junjie (李俊杰)	Mayor of Shizuishan; 1985–1988	Succeeded by Ma Wenliang (马文亮)
Assembly seats
Preceded by Ma Sizhong	Chairman of the Ningxia Hui Autonomous Regional Committee of the Chinese People's Political Consultative Conference; 2001–2008	Succeeded by Xiang Zongxi
