= Xiang Zongxi =

Chinese politician

- 项宗西

Chairman of the Ningxia Hui Autonomous Regional Committee of the Chinese People's Political Consultative Conference
- In office January 2008 – March 2013
- Preceded by: Ren Qixing
- Succeeded by: Qi Tongsheng

Personal details
- Born: March 1947 (age 79) Yueqing County, Zhejiang, China
- Party: Chinese Communist Party
- Education: Ningxia Open University

Chinese name
- Simplified Chinese: 项宗西
- Traditional Chinese: 項宗西
Transcriptions
Standard Mandarin
- Hanyu Pinyin: Xiàng Zōngxī

Xiang Zongxi (Chinese: 项宗西; born March 1947) is a Chinese politician who served as chairman of the Ningxia Hui Autonomous Regional Committee of the Chinese People's Political Consultative Conference between 2008 and 2013. He was a representative of the 17th National Congress of the Chinese Communist Party and a member of the 17th Central Commission for Discipline Inspection. He was a member of the 11th National Committee of the Chinese People's Political Consultative Conference.

== Early life and education ==
Xiang was born in Yueqing County (now Yueqing), Zhejiang, in March 1947.

== Career ==
During the Cultural Revolution, he was a sent-down youth in Yongning County, northwest China's Ningxia Hui Autonomous Region. Starting in January 1972, he served in several posts in Ningxia Glass Factory, including accountant, technician, team leader, deputy factory director, and factory director. He joined the Chinese Communist Party (CCP) in June 1979. He was appointed vice magistrate of Yongning County in January 1985 and a month later was admitted to member of the CCP Yongning County Committee, the county's top authority.

In September 1986, Xiang became deputy director of Yinchuan Municipal Planning Commission, rising to director in August 1989. He was named vice mayor of Yinchuan in April 1994 and in December 1997 was admitted to member of the CCP Yinchuan Municipal Committee, the city's top authority.

Xiang was director of Ningxia Hui Autonomous Region Development Planning Commission in March 1998 and subsequently vice chairperson of Ningxia in May 2002. He was admitted to member of the CCP Ningxia Hui Autonomous Regional Committee, the region's top authority, in December 2004, and was appointed secretary of the Discipline Inspection Commission in August 2006. In January 2008, he took office as chairman of the Ningxia Hui Autonomous Regional Committee of the Chinese People's Political Consultative Conference, the regional advisory body.

In March 2013, Xiang was chosen as vice chairperson of the Committee for Economic Affairs of the Chinese People's Political Consultative Conference.

Assembly seats
Preceded by Ren Qixing	Chairman of the Ningxia Hui Autonomous Regional Committee of the Chinese People's Political Consultative Conference; 2008–2013	Succeeded by Qi Tongsheng
