= Li Jinglin (politician) =

Chinese politician

- 李景林

Chairman of the Ningxia Hui Autonomous Regional Committee of the Chinese People's Political Consultative Conference
- In office October 1958 – May 1966
- Preceded by: Pan Zili
- Succeeded by: Yang Jingren

Secretary of the Ningxia Provincial Committee of the Chinese Communist Party
- In office January 1953 – September 1954
- Preceded by: Zhu Min
- Succeeded by: Wang Feng

Personal details
- Born: October 1909 Qingjian County, Shaanxi, Qing China
- Died: 6 December 1980 (aged 71) Beijing, China
- Party: Chinese Communist Party

Chinese name
- Chinese: 李景林
Transcriptions
Standard Mandarin
- Hanyu Pinyin: Lǐ Jǐnglín

Birth name
- Traditional Chinese: 李樹春
- Simplified Chinese: 李树春
Transcriptions
Standard Mandarin
- Hanyu Pinyin: Lǐ Shùchūn

Courtesy name
- Traditional Chinese: 實甫
- Simplified Chinese: 实甫
Transcriptions
Standard Mandarin
- Hanyu Pinyin: Shífǔ

Li Jinglin (Chinese: 李景林; October 1909 – 6 December 1980) was a Chinese politician who served Chairman of the Ningxia Hui Autonomous Regional Committee of the Chinese People's Political Consultative Conference from 1958 to 1966.

Li was a representative of the 7th National Congress of the Chinese Communist Party. He was a delegate to the 2nd and 3rd National People's Congress. He was a member of the Standing Committee of the 5th Chinese People's Political Consultative Conference.

== Biography ==
Li was born Li Shuchun (李树春) in Qingjian County, Shaanxi, in October 1909, during the Qing dynasty (1644–1911).

Li joined the Communist Youth League of China in 1925, and joined the Chinese Communist Party (CCP) in May 1927. From 1927 to 1949, he mainly worked in the Shaanxi-Gansu-Ningxia Border Region.

After founding of the Communist State in October 1949, Li was appointed vice chairman of Ningxia Provincial People's Government, concurrently serving as director of the Ningxia Provincial Construction Department and director of the Ningxia Provincial Finance and Economic Commission. He was also admitted to member of the CCP Ningxia Provincial Committee, the province's top authority. From January 1953 to September 1954, he served as secretary of the CCP Ningxia Provincial Committee, chairman of All Ethnic Groups Consultative Committee, as well as president of the CCP Ningxia Provincial Committee Cadre School. After the merger of Gansu and Ningxia in 1954, he was made the 3rd secretary of the CCP Gansu Provincial Committee in August 1954. In January 1957, he became secretary of the Supervision Committee of the CCP Gansu Provincial Committee, in addition to serving as secretary of the CCP Huining County Committee. After the Ningxia Hui Autonomous Region was established in 1958, he was chosen as secretary of the Working Committee of the CCP Ningxia Hui Autonomous Regional Committee. In October 1958, he was proposed as chairman of the Ningxia Hui Autonomous Regional Committee of the Chinese People's Political Consultative Conference, serving in the post until the outbreak of the Cultural Revolution in 1966. During the Cultural Revolution, he suffered political persecution and was sent to the May Seventh Cadre Schools to do farm works in 1969. He was reinstated as vice chairman of the Ningxia Hui Autonomous Regional Committee of the Chinese People's Political Consultative Conference in December 1977.

On 6 December 1980, Li died in Beijing, at the age of 71.

Party political offices
Preceded by Zhu Min	Secretary of the Ningxia Provincial Committee of the Chinese Communist Party; 1953–1954	Succeeded by Wang Feng
Assembly seats
Preceded by Pan Zili	Chairman of the Ningxia Hui Autonomous Regional Committee of the Chinese People's Political Consultative Conference; 1958–1966	Succeeded by Yang Jingren
