= Xie Zhenhua (general) =

Chinese politician (1916–2011)

- 谢振华
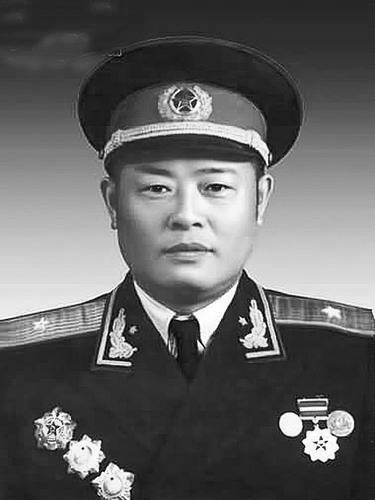
- Xie in 1955

First Secretary of the Shanxi Revolutionary Committee
- In office 23 July 1967 – May 1975
- Preceded by: Liu Geping
- Succeeded by: Wang Qian

Personal details
- Born: Xie Zhenpan (谢振泮); August 1916 Chongyi County, Jiangxi, China
- Died: 3 August 2011 (aged 94–95) Beijing, China

Military service
- Allegiance: China
- Branch/service: People's Liberation Army
- Years of service: 1930–1987
- Rank: General
- Battles/wars: Chinese Civil War; Second Sino-Japanese War

Xie Zhenhua (Chinese: 谢振华; 1916 – 3 August 2011) was a People's Liberation Army major general. He was born in Chongyi County, Jiangxi. He joined the Chinese Workers' and Peasants' Red Army in 1929 and the Chinese Communist Party in 1931. He fought against the Kuomintang in the Fifth Encirclement Campaign against Jiangxi Soviet during the Chinese Civil War. During the Second Sino-Japanese War, he was a member of the Eighth Route Army. He participated in the Huaihai Campaign, Shanghai Campaign and the Korean War. From 1971 to 1975, he was Communist Party Chief and Chairman of the Revolutionary Committee of Shanxi Province.

Military offices
Preceded by Chen Ziyu	Commander of Shanxi Military District; 1968–1975	Succeeded by Wang Fuzhi
Government offices
Preceded by Liu Geping	Chairman of Shanxi Revolutionary Committee; 1971–75	Succeeded by Wang Qian
