= Ma Sizhong =

Chinese politician (1931–2010)

- 马思忠

Chairman of the Ningxia Hui Autonomous Regional Committee of the Chinese People's Political Consultative Conference
- In office May 1998 – April 2001
- Preceded by: Liu Guofan
- Succeeded by: Ren Qixing

Chairman of Ningxia Hui Autonomous Regional People's Congress
- In office June 1988 – May 1998
- Preceded by: Hei Boli
- Succeeded by: Mao Rubai

Personal details
- Born: February 1931 Xiji County, Ningxia, China
- Died: 2 January 2010 (aged 78) Yinchuan, Ningxia, China
- Party: Chinese Communist Party
- Education: Longdong Cadre School

Military service
- Allegiance: People's Republic of China
- Branch/service: People's Liberation Army Ground Force
- Years of service: 1943–1949
- Unit: Hui Cavalry Regiment
- Battles/wars: Battle in Qingyang

Chinese name
- Simplified Chinese: 马思忠
- Traditional Chinese: 馬思忠
Transcriptions
Standard Mandarin
- Hanyu Pinyin: Mǎ Sīzhōng

Ma Sizhong (Chinese: 马思忠; February 1931 – 2 January 2010) was a Chinese politician of Hui ethnicity who served as chairman of Ningxia Hui Autonomous Regional People's Congress from 1988 to 1998 and chairman of the Ningxia Hui Autonomous Regional Committee of the Chinese People's Political Consultative Conference from 1998 to 2001.

Ma was a representative of the 11th, 12th, 13th, 14th, 16th, and 17th National Congress of the Chinese Communist Party. He was an alternate member of the th, 12th and 13th Central Committee of the Chinese Communist Party. He was a delegate to the 3rd, 7th and 8th National People's Congress. He was a member of the 9th National Committee of the Chinese People's Political Consultative Conference.

== Biography ==
Ma was born in Xiji County, Ningxia, in February 1931, to Ma Xichun (马喜春), a martyr killed by the Kuomintang in 1939.

Ma enlisted in the Hui Cavalry Regiment in 1943 and joined the Chinese Communist Party (CCP) in June 1947, at the age of 16. In May 1948, he fought the Hui Cavalry Regiment in the battle against the National Revolutionary Army in Qingyang, Gansu.

After founding of the Communist State, in February 1951, Ma was appointed governor of Baiya District, responsible for suppressing bandits in mountainous areas. He successively served as director of Jingyuan County Public Security Bureau, second secretary of the CCP Jingyuan County Committee, first secretary of the CCP Jingyuan County Committee, magistrate and deputy party secretary of Guyuan County, and party secretary of Longde County.

In 1966, the Cultural Revolution broke out, Ma was removed from office and effectively sidelined. In 1971, he was admitted to member of the CCP Ningxia Hui Autonomous Regional Committee, the region's top authority. He rose to become vice chairman of Ningxia in January 1981. In June 1988, he was promoted again to become chairman of Ningxia Hui Autonomous Regional People's Congress, a position he held until May 1998, when he was proposed as chairman of the Ningxia Hui Autonomous Regional Committee of the Chinese People's Political Consultative Conference.

Ma retired in April 2001.

On 2 January 2010, Ma died in Yinchuan, at the age of 78.

Assembly seats
| Preceded by Hei Boli | Chairman of Ningxia Hui Autonomous Regional People's Congress; 1988–1998 | Succeeded by Mao Rubai |
| Preceded by Liu Guofan | Chairman of the Ningxia Hui Autonomous Regional Committee of the Chinese People's Political Consultative Conference; 1998–2001 | Succeeded by Ren Qixing |
