= Liu Guofan =

Chinese politician

- 刘国范

Chairman of the Ningxia Hui Autonomous Regional of the Chinese People's Political Consultative Conference
- In office May 1993 – May 1998
- Preceded by: Li Yunhe
- Succeeded by: Ma Sizhong

Personal details
- Born: 1929 Kaiyuan County, Fengtian, China
- Died: 25 August 2001 (aged 71–72) Yinchuan, Ningxia, China
- Party: Chinese Communist Party
- Education: Liaoning Technical University

Chinese name
- Simplified Chinese: 刘国范
- Traditional Chinese: 劉國范
Transcriptions
Standard Mandarin
- Hanyu Pinyin: Liú Guófàn

Liu Guofan (Chinese: 刘国范; 1929 – 25 August 2001) was a Chinese politician who served as chairman of the Ningxia Hui Autonomous Regional of the Chinese People's Political Consultative Conference from 1993 to 1998.

Liu was an alternate member of the 12th and 13th Central Committee of the Chinese Communist Party. He was a member of the 9th National Committee of the Chinese People's Political Consultative Conference.

== Biography ==
Liu was born in Kaiyuan County (now Kaiyuan), Fengtian (now Liaoning), in 1929. In 1952 he graduated from Fushun Mining Senior Vocational School (now Liaoning Technical University).

Liu joined the Chinese Communist Party (CCP) in 1954. He successively served as deputy director of Fushun Coal Mine Design Institute, deputy director and engineer of the Design Office of Ningxia Hui Autonomous Regional Coal Management Bureau, director of Ningxia Hui Autonomous Regional Coal Industry Bureau, and secretary-general of the CCP Ningxia Hui Autonomous Regional Committee, the region's top authority. He rose to become deputy party secretary of Ningxia in 1985. In May 1993, Liu was proposed as chairman of the Ningxia Hui Autonomous Regional of the Chinese People's Political Consultative Conference, the provincial advisory body.

On 25 August 2001, Liu died in Yinchuan, at the age of 72.

Assembly seats
Preceded by Li Yunhe	Chairman of the Ningxia Hui Autonomous Regional of the Chinese People's Political Consultative Conference; 1993–1998	Succeeded by Ma Sizhong
