= Xing Zhaotang =

Chinese politician

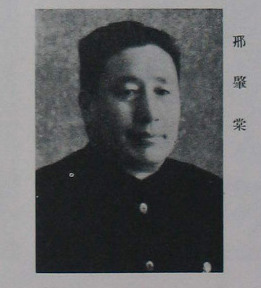
Xing Zhaotang

Xing Zhaotang (Chinese: 邢肇棠) (1894–1961) original name Guangzu (Chinese: 光祖), courtesy name Zhaotang (Chinese: 照堂), was a politician of the People's Republic of China. He was born in Tongwei County, Gansu Province. A veteran of the Second Zhili–Fengtian War, he was a regiment commander in the Guominjun. In 1927, he became a division commander in the National Revolutionary Army's 6th Division. Xing joined the opposition to Chiang Kai-shek. After the beginning of the Second Sino-Japanese War, Xing and Sun Dianying created a guerrilla force in northern Hebei Province and Chahar Province. This was absorbed into the National Revolutionary Army in 1939 as the New 5th Army, with Xing as deputy army commander. During the Chinese Civil War, Xing sided with the Chinese Communist Party against the Kuomintang due to opposition to Chiang. He was made vice chairman of Ningxia in 1949, chairman in 1952 and vice governor of Henan Province in 1955.

Preceded by Pan Zili	Chairman of Ningxia; 1952–1954	Succeeded by Liu Geping
