= Jo Eun =

South Korean poet (born 1960)

Jo Eun (Korean: 조은; born 1960) is a South Korean poet. In her early poems, she focused on connecting nature and an inner world, but she has gradually expanded her poetry world to deal with other people and an outer world. In 2014, she won the Jeon Sukhui Literary Award.

== Biography ==
She was born in 1960 in Andong, North Kyungsang Province. She debuted with three poems including "Ddangeun jugeomeul horakhorak badajuji anneunda (땅은 주검을 호락호락 받아주지 않는다 The Land Does Not Easily Accommodate Dead Bodies)" in Segyeui Munhak (세계의 문학 World's Literature) in 1988. For a long time, she has studied poetry by herself and she met Oh Kyuwon through his lecture and kept up acquaintance with him until he died. She said that she could not write poems when she was happy; she could only write through the five senses recovered at the misfortunate moment. With her belief that literature is part of an ordinary life, she has seldom met with anyone from literary circles. Living in Sajik-dong, Seoul, she has a poetry reading once a month. Since June 2019, she has published serially "Joeunui dosisanchaek (Jo Eun's Walking in the City)" which describes every corner of the city through her delicate lens.

She also published several poetry collections including Sarangui wiryeokeuro (사랑의 위력으로 With the Power of Love; 1991), Ddangeun jugeomeul horakhorak badajuji anneunda (땅은 주검을 호락호락 받아주지 않는다 The Land Does Not Easily Accommodate Dead Bodies; 1991), Mudeomeul maemdoneun iyu (무덤을 맴도는 이유 The Reason for Lingering around Graves; 1996), Yeop baljaguk (옆 발자국 Footprints Next to Me; 2018). In addition, she was interested in children's books and published warmhearted stories such as Hatbyet ttatteuthan jip (햇볕 따뜻한 집 House with Warm Sunshine; 1999) and Yetnalcheoreom sala bwateoyo (옛날처럼 살아 봤어요 I Lived Like in Old Days; 2012) that inspire children with friendship and love. Besides, she released essays such as Byerangeseo salda (벼랑에서 살다 Living on the Cliff; 2001) and Maeumiyeo geoleora (마음이여, 걸어라 My Heart, Walk; 2011). She received the Jeon Sukhui Literary Award for Ttotto (또또, Ttotto; 2013), an essay illustrating the 17 years she lived with her pet, Ttotto.

== Writing ==
Her poems describe agony, pain, despair and death we face every day in our ordinary life in a plain language. Death in her poems is portrayed as part of daily life in a form of natural image not an abstract statement. A serial poem "Jeonwonilgi (전원일기 Country Diary)" in her first poetry collection, With the Power of Love, depicts a poor and depressing farm village where she spent her youth. The second collection, The Reason for Lingering around Graves, describes death as one side of life, showing her resolution to overcome difficulties without giving up on her life. The unyielding determination is expressed through her solemn tone.

Darkness, pain and death are the key aspects of her poems. But graves that used to be described as a dark image is now portrayed as something inherently vital in Ddaddeuthan heul (따뜻한 흙 Warm Earth) where death is not simply the end of life but something stimulating life. This transformation resulted from her new awareness of selfdom. In "Supui hyusik (숲의 휴식 Rest of the Forest)" and "Gayahal got (가야할 곳 The Place I Should Go)," opposite things such as light and darkness and flower and root coexist, and contradictions become identical. The form of prose highlighted in her earlier poems has been changed into the poetic form.

Her poetry world has stretched from her focus on the self and the inner world to the other and the outer world. Saengui bitsal (생의 빛살 Light of Life; 2010) shows her compassion to others who are sick and distressed through the sixth sense. Particularly, "Gieokui simcheung (기억의 심층 The Depth of Memory)" illustrates the narrator who finds her old self through flowers, trees, cats and strangers and who shares pain and sadness with others. Yeop baljaguk (옆 발자국 Footprints Next to Me; 2018) shows the journey of understanding life by looking into the destiny of human beings that past memories inevitably encounter forthcoming death at this very moment. Well illustrating attention to others, empathy of sorrow, and warm concerns for neighbors, poems in this collection are considered "the steps or footprints moving toward life, not death, despite the awareness of the close relation between life and death."

== Works ==
1) Poetry Collections

《사랑의 위력으로》, 민음사, 1991 /Sarangui wiryeokeuro (With the Power of Love), Mineumsa, 1991.

《땅은 주검을 호락호락 받아주지 않는다》, 민음사, 1991 (2007년 개정판) / Ddangeun jugeomeul horakhorak badajuji anneunda (The Land Does Not Easily Accommodate Dead Bodies) Mineumsa, 1991 (Revised Edition in 2007)

《무덤을 맴도는 이유》, 문학과지성사, 1996 / Mudeomeul maemdoneun iyu (The Reason for Lingering around Graves), Munji, 1996.

《따뜻한 흙》, 문학과지성사, 2003 / Ddaddeuthan heul (Warm Earth), Munji, 2003

《생의 빛살》, 문학과지성사, 2010 / Saengui bitsal (Light of Life), Munji, 2010.

《옆 발자국》, 문학과지성사, 2018 / Yeop baljaguk (Footprints Next to Me), Munji, 2018.

2) Essays

《벼랑에서 살다》, 마음산책, 2001 / Byerangeseo salda (Living on the Cliff), Maeumsanchaek, 2001.

《우리가 사랑해야 하는 것들에 대하여》, 샘터사, 2004 / Uriga saranghaeya haneun geotdeule daehayeo (To Things We should Love), Saemteosa, 2004.

《조용한 열정》, 마음산책, 2004 / Joyonghan yeoljeong (Quiet Passion), Maeumsanchaek, 2004.

《낯선 길로 돌아오다》, 랜덤하우스, 2009 / Natseon gillo dolaoda (Returning on an Unfamiliar Road), Random House, 2009.

《마음이여, 걸어라》, 푸른숲, 2011 / Maeumiyeo geoleora (My Heart, Walk), Pureunsup, 2011.

《또또》, 로도스, 2013 / Ttotto (Ttotto), Rodos, 2013.

《벽강 전숙희》, 한겨레출판사, 2016 / Byekkang jeonsukhui (Byekkang Jeon Sukhui), Hankyoreh, 2016.

3) Children's Books

《햇볕 따뜻한 집》, 창비, 1999 / Hatbyet ttatteuthan jip (House

《빈방들》, 열림원, 2003 / Binbangdeul (Empty Rooms), Yeolimwon, 2003.

《동생》, 푸른숲, 2003 / Dongsaeng (Sibling), Pureunsup, 2003.

《다락방의 괴짜들》, 문학과지성사, 2005 / Darakbangui goijjadeul (Weirdos in the Attic), Munji, 2005.

《으뜸 누리》, 도깨비, 2006 / Eutteum nuri (The Best World), Doggabi, 2006.

《옛날처럼 살아 봤어요》, 사계절, 2012 /Yetnalcheoreom sala bwateoyo (I Lived Like in Old Days), Sagyejeol, 2012.

《힐링 썰매》, 문학과지성사, 2016 / Hiling sseolmae (Healing Sled), Munji, 2016.
