= Liu Geping =

Chinese politician

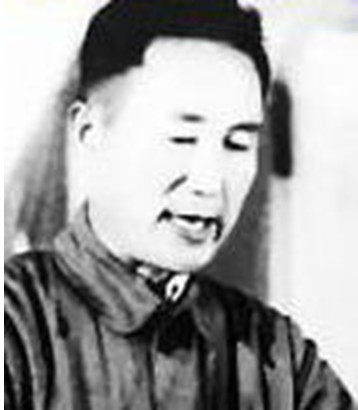

Chairman of Ningxia
- In office October 1958 – September 1960
- Preceded by: Xing Zhaotang
- Succeeded by: Yang Jingren

Chairman of the Revolutionary Committee of Shanxi
- In office March 1967 – April 1971
- Preceded by: Wei Heng (as CCP First Secretary)
- Succeeded by: Xie Zhenhua

Personal details
- Born: 8 August 1904 Mengcun, Hebei, China
- Died: 11 March 1992 (aged 87) Beijing, China
- Party: Chinese Communist Party

Chinese name
- Traditional Chinese: 劉格平
- Simplified Chinese: 刘格平
Transcriptions
Standard Mandarin
- Hanyu Pinyin: Liú Gépíng
- Wade–Giles: Liu Ke-p'ing

Liu Geping (Chinese: 刘格平; 8 August 1904 – 11 March 1992) was a Chinese communist revolutionary and politician of Hui Muslim heritage. He is best known as the founding Chairman of the Ningxia Hui Autonomous Region and later for seizing power in Shanxi during the Cultural Revolution, where he made himself the top leader of the province.

Liu spent his early days as a communist agitator, leading peasant uprisings and building the party organization in rural areas. A political survivor, he was arrested several times during the Warlord Era and served two prison terms. After the founding of the People's Republic of China in 1949, he held important roles in the party and government but was branded a traitor in 1960. He later returned to work, only to be purged again several years later during the Cultural Revolution. He was rehabilitated after the Cultural Revolution and spent the rest of his life in ceremonial positions.

== Republic of China ==
=== Warlord Era ===
Liu Geping was born on 8 August 1904 into a large landowning family of Muslim Hui ethnicity in Dadi East Village (大堤东村), Mengcun County, Hebei. He also used the names Liu Zimin (刘子敏) and Liu Xiangnong (刘襄侬). In 1918 he joined the army of Li Chun, a warlord of the Zhili Clique, and entered its military school in Nanjing. The next year he participated in the May Fourth Movement as an activist. He joined the Chinese Socialist Youth League in 1922, and returned home to spread revolutionary values. Instrumental in the founding of the first socialist youth cell in the area, in December 1925 he co-led an armed peasant uprising against the Beiyang government, the first of its kind in northern China.

In July 1926, Liu joined the Chinese Communist Party and then spearheaded a series of educational initiatives aimed at increasing the influence of the party in the Tianjin-Hebei region. After founding schools and party organizations in dozens of counties, he took part in the founding of a 300-strong "Southern Tianjin Revolutionary Army", which aimed to topple warlords and incite armed uprisings. In June 1928 he led a peasant uprising in Qingyun County, occupying the county seat and taking guns from the local police. He was arrested that year for his agitation and spent the next three years in prison. After he was released, the Communist Party sent him to Shaanxi to work for Yang Hucheng's army.

=== Japanese invasion and Civil War ===
After the Mukden incident and subsequent Japanese incursions into China, Liu became a founding member of the "Hui People Against Japanese Invasion" organization. In 1932 he returned home to work on military operations and to coordinate underground party activities. He was again arrested on April 20, 1934, after organizing the Majia River (马颊河) uprising in Qingyun. From January 1936 onwards, he was transferred and held in Caolanzi Prison (草岚子监狱) in Beijing, along with 61 other Communist Party leaders including Bo Yibo, An Ziwen, and Liu Lantao (no relation). To secure their release, the Communist Party Central Committee advised them to sign an announcement denouncing communism. Most complied and were released by the Kuomintang government, but Liu Geping was among the few who refused and served his full sentence.

After his release in 1944, Liu took on more leadership roles within the Tianjin branch of the Communist Party. He then went to Shandong to found an organization for ethnic Hui to aid soldiers on the front lines of the Chinese Civil War. In March 1949, he went south with the People's Liberation Army to East China and served as vice-principal of the newly established East China People's Revolution University.

== People's Republic of China ==
=== Early PRC ===
In September 1949, Liu Geping was selected as an ethnic minority representative to attend the first meeting of the Communist-led Chinese People's Political Consultative Conference; he was ranked first among minority delegates. At the founding ceremony of the People's Republic of China on 1 October 1949, he was selected to speak in Tiananmen Square as the official representative of China's minority peoples.

Liu joined the government and became deputy director of the State Ethnic Affairs Commission. In this capacity Liu frequently visited western areas with high minority populations. He was a delegate to the 1st National People's Congress in 1954. After the congress, Liu and the Tibetan communist Phünwang were assigned to accompany the 14th Dalai Lama, also a delegate, on his tour of Chinese cities, which had a great impact on the Dalai Lama.

In 1956, Liu was elected a member of the 8th Central Committee of the Chinese Communist Party. In 1958, Liu began heading up the party organization of the Ningxia Hui Autonomous Region on an interim basis. He became the first chairman of the autonomous region government in October 1958. Because he took a moderate approach to policies toward ethnic minorities, he was branded an "ethnic splittist" in 1960. In September he was dismissed from all of his positions and sent back to Beijing to take part in "rehabilitation" at the Central Party School.

=== Cultural Revolution ===
In December 1965, Liu regained favour and was named Vice-Governor of Shanxi. At the beginning of the Cultural Revolution, having gained the support of leftist radicals in Beijing, Liu successfully overthrew his superior Wei Heng and became Chairman of the Shanxi Revolutionary Committee, the de facto top leader. Wei was imprisoned and committed suicide. Meanwhile, the Central Cultural Revolution Group, led by Kang Sheng and Jiang Qing, began to investigate the case of the 61 communist leaders who were instructed to denounce communism at Caolanzi Prison in the 1930s. The officials, notably Bo Yibo and An Ziwen, were branded as the "61 Renegades Clique" and persecuted. In contrast, Liu Geping was heralded as a hero for his refusal to sign the denunciation. He was invited to make speeches all over the country and was re-elected to the 9th Central Committee of the Chinese Communist Party in April 1969. However, Liu had also become involved in major disputes with the military leaders in Shanxi and was engaged in factional violence in the province. He was dismissed from office in July 1969, just three months after his re-election to the Central Committee. In 1970, he was sent to perform manual labour at a pottery factory in Tangshan. He was allowed to return to Beijing in 1975.

=== Later life ===
After the end of the Cultural Revolution in 1976 and the pivotal 3rd Plenary Session of the 11th Central Committee of the Chinese Communist Party, the post-Mao Communist Party cleared Liu's name and declared that he "did not have any political problems." In 1983, he was named a member of the National Committee of the 6th Chinese People's Political Consultative Conference, a ceremonial position.

Liu died in Beijing on 11 March 1992. He was given full funeral rites at the Babaoshan Revolutionary Cemetery. His body was taken back to his native village and buried according to Muslim Hui rituals.

== Bibliography ==
- Goldstein, Melvyn C. (2007). A History of Modern Tibet: The calm before the storm, 1951–1955. Berkeley: University of California Press. ISBN 978-0-520-24941-7.
- Guo, Jian; Song, Yongyi; Zhou, Yuan (2009). The A to Z of the Chinese Cultural Revolution. Lanham, MD: Rowman & Littlefield. ISBN 978-0-8108-6870-0.
- MacFarquhar, Roderick; Schoenhals, Michael (2009). Mao's Last Revolution. Cambridge, MA: Harvard University Press. ISBN 978-0-674-04041-0.

Educational offices
Preceded by Ulanhu	President of the Minzu University of China; 1954–1957	Succeeded by Liu Chun
Government offices
Preceded by Wang Qian	Chairman of the Revolutionary Committee of Shanxi; 1967–1971	Succeeded by Xie Zhenhua
Preceded by Xing Zhaotang	Chairma of Ningxia; 1958–1960	Succeeded by Yang Jingren
Party political offices
Preceded by Wei Heng	Communist Party Secretary of Shanxi; 1967–1971	Succeeded by Xie Zhenhua
Military offices
Preceded by Wei Heng	Political Commissar of Shanxi Military District; 1967–1971	Succeeded by Liu Yantian
