= Qu Geping =

Chinese environmental scientist

Qu Geping is a Chinese environmental scientist. He was Director of the Chinese State Environmental Protection Agency from 1987 to June 1993. He was born in 1930. He is from Feicheng in Shandong Province.

In 1999, he was the winner of the Blue Planet Prize along with Paul R. Ehrlich.

In 2001, he was awarded the Duke of Edinburgh Conservation Medal, the highest award of the World Wildlife Fund, calling him the father of environmental protection in China.
