= Anhui University of Science and Technology =

Provincial public university in Huainan, Anhui, China

- Type: Public
- Established: 1945
- President: Yan Shilong (颜事龙)
- Faculty: 1,950
- Undergraduates: 17,100+
- Postgraduates: 4,000+
- Location: Huainan, Anhui, People's Republic of China
- Campus: Urban, 3 campuses
- Website: aust.edu.cn

The Anhui University of Science and Technology (Chinese: 安徽理工大学; pinyin: Ānhuī Lǐgōng Dàxué) is a provincial public university in Huainan, Anhui, China. It is affiliated with the Anhui Provincial Government, and co-sponsored by the Ministry of Emergency Management.

Covering a land area of 1,300 mu, the university is divided into three campuses.

== History ==
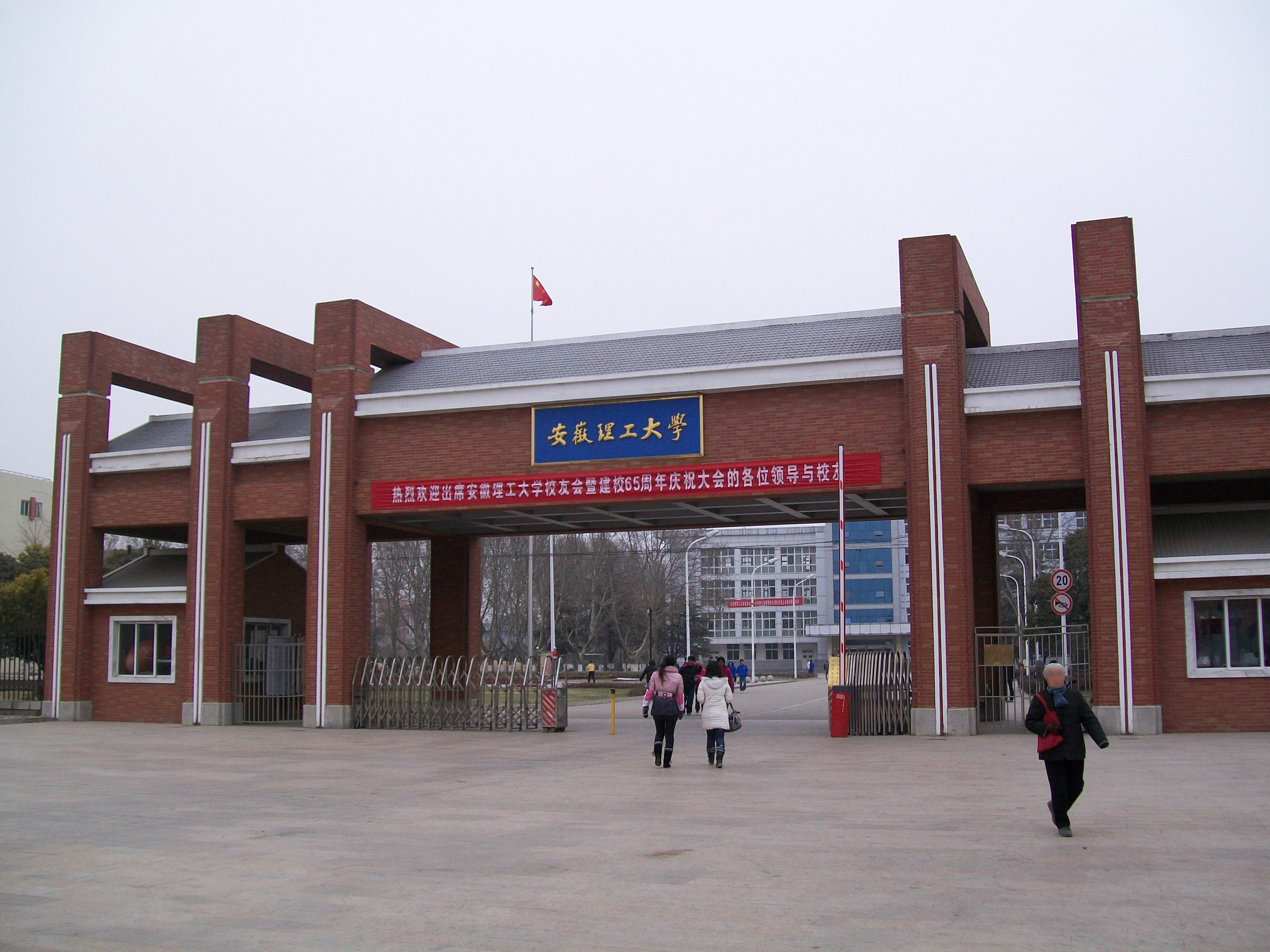
School gate.

The Anhui University of Science and Technology (the predecessor of the university, namely, Bengbu Advanced Industrial and Professional Training School of Anhui Province) was founded in 1945. It was one of two institutions of higher education in the then Anhui Province. The school was renamed "Hefei Mining Institute" in 1955, and moved to Hefei the same year, and again renamed "Hefei University of Technology" in 1958.

In 1971 the Department of Geology and the Department of Mining Engineering were established in the university and then moved to Huainan City completely, together with some teachers of the Department of Basic Courses, Mechanical Engineering, and Electrical Engineering, on the basis of which established Huainan Coal Mine Institute. The institute was renamed "Huainan Mining Institute" in 1981. In 1993 the former East China Medical School merged into the institute, which was renamed "Huainan Institute of Technology" in 1997.

Since 1998 the university has come under the Province instead of the former Ministry of Coal Industry of the state due to the readjustment of the organs of the State Council. In 2000, Huainan School of Chemical Engineering, a junior school of the former Ministry of Chemical Engineering of the country, merged into the university according to the resolution of the Provincial Government. In February 2002 the university adopted the present name authorized by the State Education Commission.

In September 2016, the new campus located in the new Shannan District, was opened, dwarfing the old campus in size.

The university has disciplines in engineering, science, medicine, management, and the arts.

University history

== Organization ==
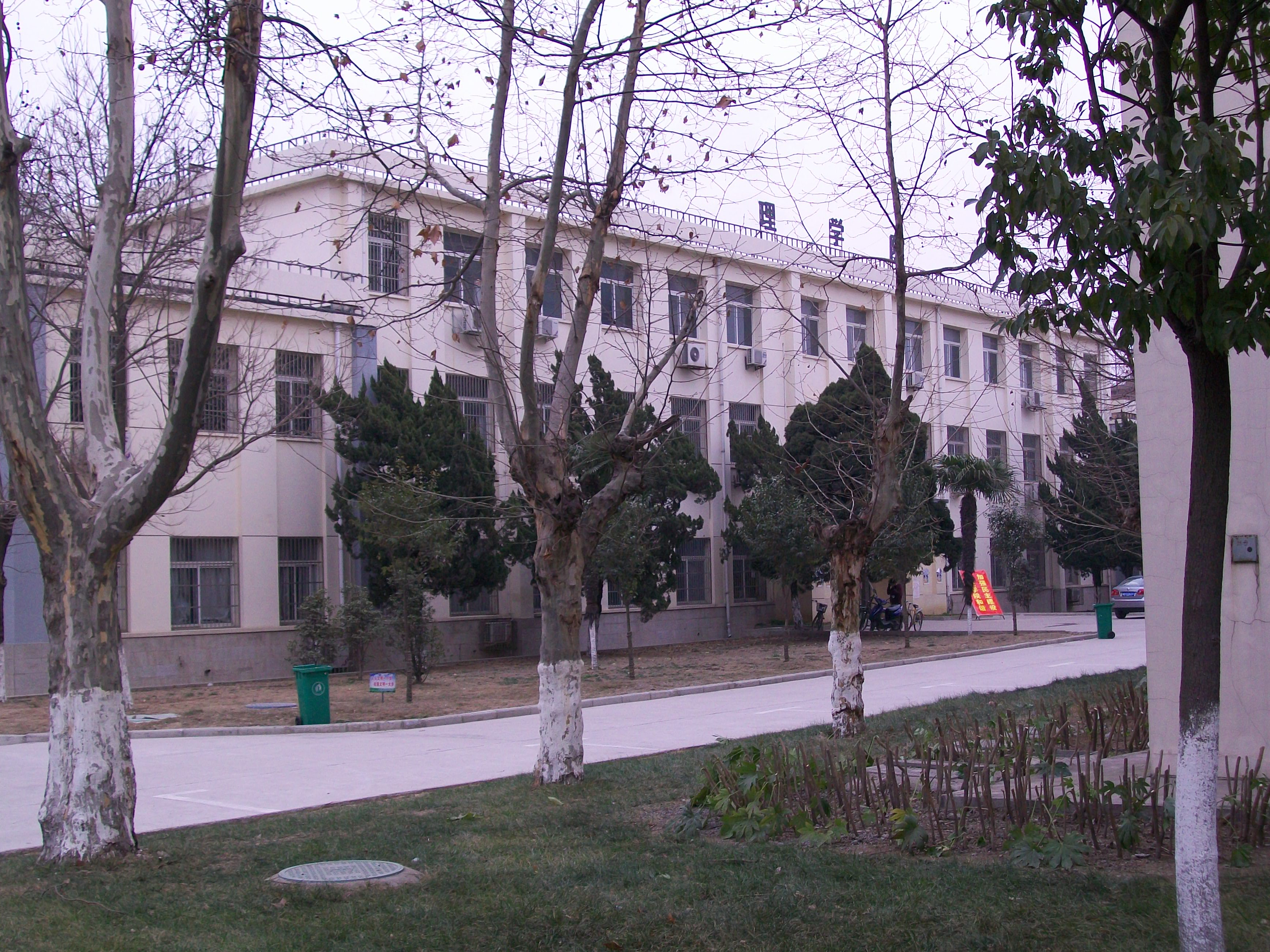
College of Science.

A president (校長) heads the university. Each school (院) is headed by a dean (院長), and each department (系) by a chairman (系主任). Students elect their representatives each year to attend administrative meetings.

The university consists of 12 departments, an advanced vocational and technical training school, an adult education school, and more than 42 research institutes.

- School of Earth and Environment
- School of Energy and Safety
- School of Civil Engineering and Architecture
- School of Mechanical Engineering
- School of Electrical and Information Engineering
- School of Material Science and Engineering
- School of Chemical Engineering
- School of Computer Science and Engineering
- School of Science
- School of Foreign Languages
- School of Medicine
- School of Economic and Management
- School of Humanity and Social Sciences
- School of Continuing Education

The university was authorized to grant Master and bachelor's degrees in 1981 by the State Council. It was also authorized to confer master's degrees to those either at work or with the same educational experience. At present, there are in the university 50 master and 42 bachelor programs, with over 21,000 students, of which 17,120 are bachelors and over 4,000 are masters.

It is now the only university in Anhui Province that has the privilege to grant engineering master's degrees, and the only one multi-disciplined university having a discipline in medicine.

== University library ==
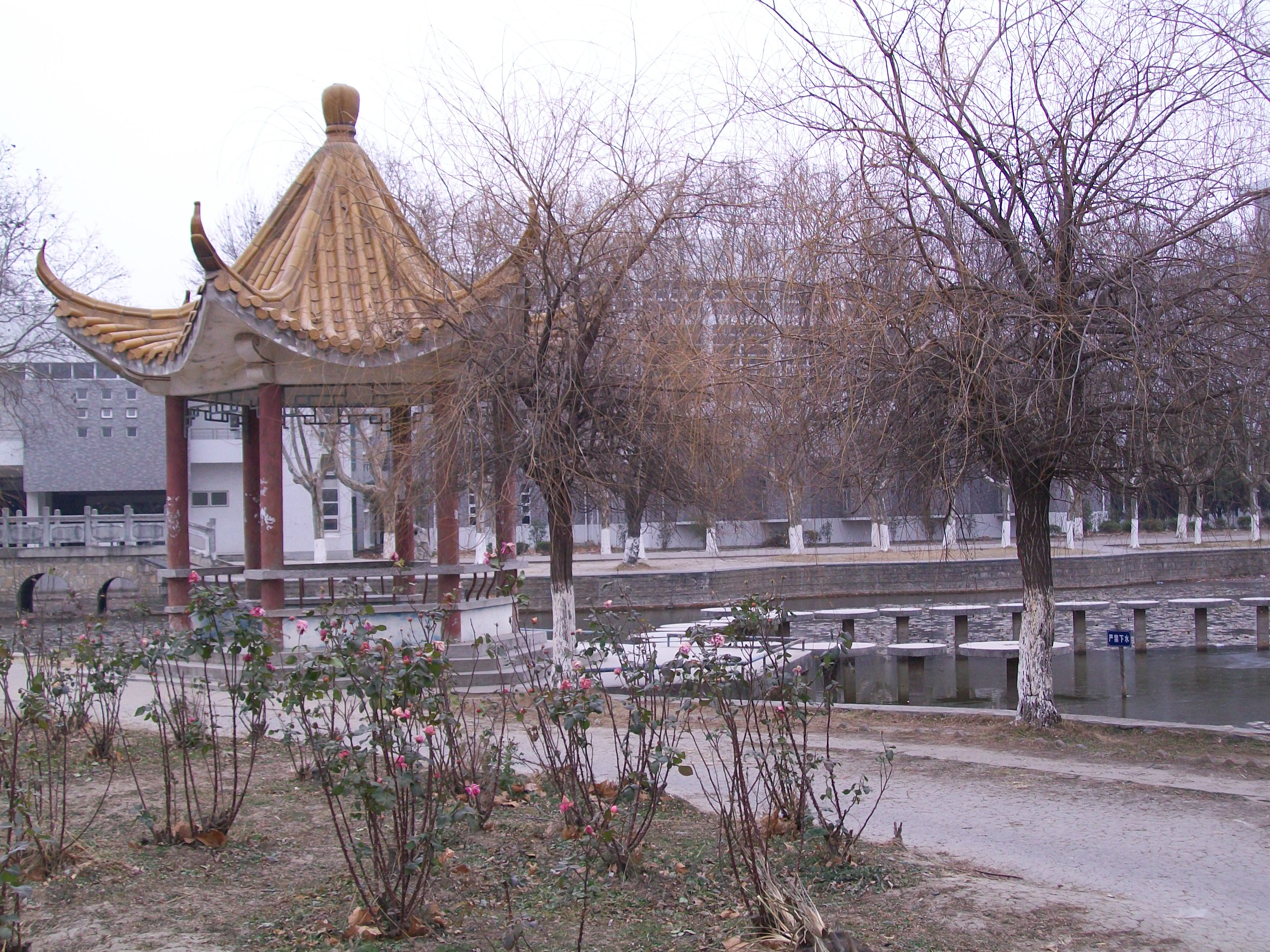
A pavilion.

The library was established in 1954. It occupies a central location of the campus. There are seven floors with over 10,000 square meters of floor space, providing 6,442 seats and a computer lab. In 2006, the library has a collection of more than 1,900,000 volumes of books and bound periodicals, as well as a collection of electronic and non-print materials.

Library resources

- 1,239,000 volumes of printed books and journals
- 350,000 units of micro forms
- 602,000 titles of media resources
- 99,000 titles of resources via internet
- 6,400 seats, including 1,800 study carrels for individual use
- 28 rooms for group study and discussion
- A classroom and computer laboratory for group instruction
- Self-service photocopiers on every floor
- Wireless internet connection

== Campus culture ==
The Students’ Union, the Students’ Scientific Society, Art Team, and the Youth Volunteers’ Society organize cultural and art festivals, science and technology festivals, sport festivals, work-study programs, and social activities in the forms of lectures, seminars, contests, soliciting articles, training and weekend music parties.

== Intercollegiate relations ==
AUST has intercollegiate relations with 20 universities and research institutes of Australia, Germany, the US and other foreign countries. Relations include international exchange of experts, cooperations, and scholars studying abroad.
