= Yang Jingren =

Chinese politician

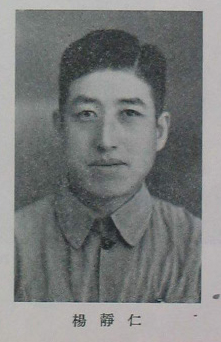
Yan Jingren

Yang Jingren (Chinese: 楊靜仁, Xiao'erjing: ﻳْﺎ دٍ ژٌ) (1918 – October 19, 2001) was a People's Republic of China politician. A member of the Hui people ethnic group, he was born in Lanzhou, Gansu Province. He was the head of the United Front Work Department from 1982 to 1985.

Party political offices
Preceded by Wang Feng	Communist Party Chief of Ningxia	Succeeded by Kang Jianmin
Government offices
Preceded by Liu Geping	Chairman of Ningxia	Succeeded by Kang Jianmin
