= Qi Tongsheng =

Chinese politician

- 齐同生

Chairman of the Ningxia Hui Autonomous Regional Committee of the Chinese People's Political Consultative Conference
- In office January 2013 – January 2018
- Preceded by: Xiang Zongxi
- Succeeded by: Cui Bo

Personal details
- Born: July 1952 (age 74) Pingshan County, Hebei, China
- Party: Chinese Communist Party (1984–2025; expelled)
- Education: Lanzhou University of Technology

Chinese name
- Simplified Chinese: 齐同生
- Traditional Chinese: 齊同生
Transcriptions
Standard Mandarin
- Hanyu Pinyin: Qí Tóngshēng

Qi Tongsheng (Chinese: 齐同生; born July 1952) is a retired Chinese politician who spent his entire career in northwest China's Ningxia Hui Autonomous Region. As of October 2024 he was under investigation by China's top anti-graft watchdog. Previously he served as vice chairperson of the Ethnic and Religious Affairs Committee of the Chinese People's Political Consultative Conference and before that, chairman of the Ningxia Hui Autonomous Regional Committee of the Chinese People's Political Consultative Conference. He was a member of the 13th National Committee of the Chinese People's Political Consultative Conference.

== Early life and education ==
Qi was born in Pingshan County, Hebei, in July 1952. During the Cultural Revolution in 1968, he became a sent-down youth in Pingluo County, northwest China's Ningxia Hui Autonomous Region. In 1977, he graduated from Gansu University of Technology (now Lanzhou University of Technology).

== Career ==
Qi entered the workforce in November 1968, and joined the Chinese Communist Party (CCP) in November 1984.

In September 1985, Qi became vice president of Ningxia Industrial Design Institute, rising to president in June 1990. He was assigned to Ningxia Hui Autonomous Region Planning Committee in October 1995. At the committee, he eventually became deputy director in March 1998 and director in June 2002. He was appointed vice chairman of Ningxia Hui Autonomous Regional People's Government in January 2005 and in June 2007 was admitted to member of the CCP Ningxia Hui Autonomous Regional Committee, the region's top authority. In January 2013, he was chosen as chairman of the Ningxia Hui Autonomous Regional Committee of the Chinese People's Political Consultative Conference, the regional advisory body.

In March 2018, Qi took office as vice chairperson of the Ethnic and Religious Affairs Committee of the Chinese People's Political Consultative Conference, and served until March 2023.

== Downfall ==
On 8 October 2024, Qi was put under investigation for alleged "serious violations of discipline and laws" by the Central Commission for Discipline Inspection (CCDI), the party's internal disciplinary body, and the National Supervisory Commission, the highest anti-corruption agency of China.

On 14 March 2025, Qi was expelled from the CCP. On 25 March, he was arrested on suspicion of taking bribes as per a decision made by the Supreme People's Procuratorate. On 3 July, he was indicted on suspicion of accepting bribes.

Assembly seats
Preceded by Xiang Zongxi	Chairman of the Ningxia Hui Autonomous Regional Committee of the Chinese People's Political Consultative Conference; 2013–2018	Succeeded by Cui Bo
